= 2008 Houston Dynamo season =

Houston Dynamo
2008 season
- Owner: Philip Anschutz (AEG)
- President COO: Oliver Luck; Chris Canetti
- Head coach: Dominic Kinnear
- Stadium: Robertson Stadium
- Major League Soccer: Conference: 1st, Overall: 2nd
- MLS Cup Playoffs: Conference Semifinals
- U.S. Open Cup: Third Round
- CONCACAF Champions' Cup: Semifinals
- CONCACAF Champions League: Quarterfinals
- SuperLiga: Runners-up
- Top goalscorer: League: Brian Ching: 13 goals All: Brian Ching: 14 goals
Home colors	Away colors

The 2008 Houston Dynamo season was the third season of the existence for the Houston franchise. The Houston Dynamo were the defending back-to-back MLS Cup Champions, and sought to become the first club in Major League Soccer history to win three straight MLS Cups. It was the team's third season with head coach Dominic Kinnear, majority owner Philip Anschultz, president Oliver Luck, and chief operating officer Chris Canetti.

In the MLS regular season, the Dynamo finished first in the Western Conference to qualify for the playoffs for the third consecutive season. In the MLS Cup Playoffs, Houston lost to the New York Red Bulls 4–1 on aggregate in the Conference Semifinals. They were eliminated by the Charleston Battery in the third round of the U.S. Open Cup. During the 2008 CONCACAF Champions' Cup, Houston defeated C.S.D. Municipal 3–1 on aggregate in the quarterfinals before falling in the semifinals 3–0 to Deportivo Saprissa. During the 2008 North American SuperLiga, the Dynamo reached the final, where they lost 6–5 on penalties to the New England Revolution. The Dynamo also played in the group stage of the 2008–09 CONCACAF Champions League during the season, finishing second in their group to advance.

== Major events ==
=== Team news ===
- Houston's City Council on January 30, 2008, approved the purchase of over 80 acres (320,000 m^{2}) of land near State Highway 288 and Almeda-Genoa Rd. for the development of an amateur sports complex—the first of its kind in the history of the city. The new complex will provide 18 fields for local soccer organizations and will also afford the area the opportunity to host amateur tournaments of state, regional and national stature. Once completely developed, the complex is expected to attract well over 500,000 visitors per year.
- On February 26, 2008, Houston Dynamo President Oliver Luck revealed the planned negotiations to the media stating that the Houston Dynamo would be managed in majority by original owners Anschutz Entertainment Group (who will hold 50% of ownership) along with newfound partners Gabriel Brener, head of Brener International Group, and multiple World and Olympic boxing champion Oscar De La Hoya (each with 25% ownership).

== Final roster ==
As of November 27, 2008

Appearances and goals are totals for MLS regular season only.

No.	Name	Nationality	Position	Date of birth (Age)	Joined from	Joined in	Apps.	Goals
Goalkeepers
1	Tony Caig	(England)	GK	April 11, 1974 (34)	Gretna FC	2008	7	0
18	Pat Onstad	(Canada)	GK	January 13, 1968 (40)	San Jose Earthquakes	2006	83	0
30	Corbin Waller	(United States)	GK	March 26, 1985 (23)	College of Charleston	2008	0	0
Defenders
2	Eddie Robinson	(United States)	DF	June 19, 1978 (30)	San Jose Earthquakes	2006	70	4
4	Patrick Ianni	(United States)	DF	June 15, 1985 (23)	UCLA	2006	35	1
16	Craig Waibel	(United States)	DF	August 21, 1975 (33)	San Jose Earthquakes	2006	63	5
23	Stephen Wondolowski	(United States)	DF	August 13, 1985 (23)	San Jose Frogs	2008	0	0
24	Wade Barrett (C)	(United States)	DF	June 23, 1976 (32)	San Jose Earthquakes	2006	87	0
32	Bobby Boswell	(United States)	DF	March 15, 1983 (25)	D.C. United	2008	29	1
Midfielders
3	Johnny Alcaraz	(United States)	MF	March 11, 1985 (23)	Westmont College	2008	0	0
8	Richard Mulrooney	(United States)	MF	November 3, 1976 (32)	Toronto FC	2007	51	0
9	Brian Mullan	(United States)	MF	April 23, 1978 (30)	San Jose Earthquakes	2006	89	6
11	Brad Davis	(United States)	MF	November 8, 1981 (27)	San Jose Earthquakes	2006	71	7
13	Ricardo Clark	(United States)	MF	February 10, 1983 (25)	San Jose Earthquakes	2006	75	6
14	Dwayne De Rosario	(Canada)	MF	May 15, 1978 (30)	San Jose Earthquakes	2006	78	24
17	Mike Chabala	(United States)	MF	May 24, 1984 (24)	University of Washington	2006	0	0
19	John Michael Hayden	(United States)	MF	April 27, 1984 (24)	Indiana University	2007	0	0
20	Geoff Cameron	(United States)	MF	July 11, 1985 (23)	University of Rhode Island	2008	23	1
21	Nick Hatzke	(United States)	MF	October 16, 1983 (25)	University of California	2007	0	0
22	Stuart Holden	(United States)	MF	August 1, 1985 (23)	Sunderland A.F.C.	2006	62	9
26	Corey Ashe	(United States)	MF	March 14, 1986 (22)	University of North Carolina	2007	44	1
27	Erik Ustruck	(United States)	MF	January 4, 1985 (23)	Santa Clara University	2007	0	0
Forwards
5	Kyle Brown	(United States)	FW	August 10, 1983 (25)	Real Salt Lake	2008	4	0
7	Chris Wondolowski	(United States)	FW	January 28, 1983 (25)	San Jose Earthquakes	2006	30	2
10	Kei Kamara	(Sierra Leone)	FW	September 1, 1984 (24)	San Jose Earthquakes	2008	10	2
21	Nate Jaqua	(United States)	FW	October 28, 1981 (27)	SC Rheindorf Altach	2008	29	10
25	Brian Ching	(United States)	FW	May 24, 1978 (30)	San Jose Earthquakes	2006	66	31
99	Guy-Roland Kpene	(Ivory Coast)	FW	November 23, 1983 (25)	D.C. United	2008	0	0

== Player movement ==
=== In ===
Per Major League Soccer and club policies terms of the deals do not get disclosed.

Date	Player	Position	Age	Previous club	Notes	Ref
November 2007	(United States) Stephen Wondolowski	DF	22	(United States) San Jose Frogs	Signed on a free transfer. Had been playing with the Dynamo reserve team in 2007.	
December 12, 2007	(United States) Bobby Boswell	DF	24	(United States) D.C. United	Acquired in exchange for Zach Wells and a conditional pick in the 2009 MLS SuperDraft.	
January 18, 2008	(United States) Geoff Cameron	MF	22	University of Rhode Island	Selected with the 14th pick of the 3rd round (42nd overall) in the 2008 MLS SuperDraft.	
January 18, 2008	(United States) Jeremy Barlow	MF	22	University of Virginia	Selected with the 14th pick of the 4th round (56nd overall) in the 2008 MLS SuperDraft.	
January 24, 2008	(United States) Johnny Alcaraz	MF	22	Westmont College	Selected with the 14th pick of the 1st round in the 2008 MLS Supplemental Draft.	
January 24, 2008	(United States) Craig Thompson	MF	22	Colorado School of Mines	Selected with the 14th pick of the 2nd round (28th overall) in the 2008 MLS Supplemental Draft.	
January 24, 2008	(England) Kieran Hall	MF	22	Fort Lewis College	Selected with the 14th pick of the 3rd round (42nd overall) in the 2008 MLS Supplemental Draft. Did not sign a contract with Houston.	
January 24, 2008	(Australia) James Georgeff	FW	24	University of Central Florida	Selected with the 14th pick of the 4th round (56th overall) in the 2008 MLS Supplemental Draft.	
January 29, 2008	(England) Tony Caig	GK	33	(Scotland) Gretna F.C.	Signed on a free transfer	
February 27, 2008	(Argentina) Franco Caraccio	FW	21	(Argentina) Arsenal de Sarandí	Full rights purchased	
March 4, 2008	(United States) Kyle Brown	FW	24	(United States) Real Salt Lake	Selected in the 2008 MLS Waiver Draft	
March 18, 2008	(United States) Corbin Waller	GK	22	College of Charleston	Signed on a free transfer	
May 7, 2008	(Ivory Coast) Guy-Roland Kpene	FW	24	(United States) D.C. United	Signed on a free transfer	
July 15, 2008	(United States) Nate Jaqua	FW	26	(Austria) SC Rheindorf Altach	Signed on a free transfer	
July 24, 2008	(Sierra Leone) Kei Kamara	FW	23	(United States) San Jose Earthquakes	Acquired in exchange for a 1st-round pick in the 2009 MLS SuperDraft and allocation money.	

=== Out ===
Per Major League Soccer and club policies terms of the deals do not get disclosed.

Date	Player	Position	Age	Destination Club	Notes	Ref
November 21, 2007	(United States) Ryan Cochrane	DF	23	(United States) San Jose Earthquakes	Selected in the 2007 MLS Expansion Draft.	
November 28, 2007	(United States) Jordan James	GK	25	(United States) Portland Timbers	Released after the 2007 season.	
November 28, 2007	(United States) Kenneth Hoerner	MF	23	Retired	Released after the 2007 season.	
December 12, 2007	(United States) Zach Wells	GK	26	(United States) D.C. United	Traded along with a conditional pick in the 2009 MLS SuperDraft for Bobby Boswell.	
December 31, 2007	(Zimbabwe) Joseph Ngwenya	FW	26	SK Austria Kärnten	Contract expired	
December 31, 2007	(United States) Nate Jaqua	FW	26	(Austria) SC Rheindorf Altach	Contract expired	
January 2008	(Scotland) Paul Dalglish	FW	30	(Scotland) Kilmarnock F.C.	Released after the 2007 season.	
March 20, 2008	(United States) Eric Ebert	MF	23	(United States) Chivas USA	Traded to Chivas USA for a 1st-round pick in the 2009 MLS Supplemental Draft	
March 23, 2008	(United States) Jeremy Barlow	MF	22	(United States) D.C. United	Traded to D.C. United for a 3rd-round pick in the 2009 MLS Supplemental Draft	
June 30, 2008	(United States) Craig Thompson	MF	22	(United States) D.C. United	Traded to D.C. United for a 4th-round pick in the 2010 MLS Supplemental Draft	
July 18, 2008	(Argentina) Franco Caraccio	FW	21	(Argentina) All Boys	Released	
July 29, 2008	(Australia) James Georgeff	FW	25	(Portugal) F.C. Arouca	Released	

== Coaching staff ==
Position	Name
Head coach	(United States) Dominic Kinnear
Assistant coach	(Scotland) John Spencer
Goalkeeper coach	(Canada) Mike Toshack
Head athletic trainer	(United States) Theron Enns
Assistant athletic trainer	(United States) Shane Caron
Team administrator	(United States) Nick Kowba
Equipment manager	(United States) Beau Abdulla

== Pre-season ==
=== Friendlies ===
February 13, 2008	San Jose Earthquakes	0–1	Houston Dynamo	San Jose, California
10:00 PM (CST)		Report	Clark 44'; Jeremy Barlow (yellow card) 74'	Stadium: PAL Stadium; Attendance: 3,182

February 16, 2008	San Jose Earthquakes	0–0	Houston Dynamo	San Jose, California
10:30 PM (CST)		Report		Stadium: Kezar Stadium; Attendance: 4,113

=== Pan-Pacific Championship ===
February 20, 2009 Semifinals	Houston Dynamo	3–0	Sydney FC	Honolulu, Hawaii
9:30 PM (CST)	De Rosario 27'; Holden 28'; C. Wondolowski 43'; Ianni (yellow card) 77'	Report	Santalab (yellow card) 49'; Walsh (yellow card) 60'	Stadium: Aloha Stadium; Attendance: 15,128; Referee: Alex Prus

February 23, 2008 Final	Gamba Osaka	6–1	Houston Dynamo	Honolulu, Hawaii
9:30 PM (CST)	Baré 14' 26' 60' 72' (yellow card) 59'; Lucas 64'; Yamazaki 78'	Report	Clark 11'; Davis (yellow card) 13'; Holden (yellow card) 47'	Stadium: Aloha Stadium; Attendance: 23,087; Referee: Kevin Stott

=== Texas Pro Soccer Festival ===
March 5, 2008	Houston Dynamo	4–3	Toronto FC	Cibolo, Texas
9:00 PM (CST)	C. Wondolowski 2'; Ching 42' 44'; Ustruck 47'	Report	Musampa 36'; Brittain 71' (pen.); Vairelles 81'	Stadium: Steele Stadium; Attendance: 1,000; Referee: Jasen Anno

March 7, 2008	Houston Dynamo	1–0	Chivas USA	Cibolo, Texas
9:00 PM (CST)	De Rosario 12'	Report		Stadium: Steele Stadium; Attendance: 600

March 9, 2008	Houston Dynamo	1–1	D.C. United	Cibolo, Texas
2:00 PM (CDT)	Caraccio 53'	Report	Cezar 78'	Stadium: Steele Stadium; Attendance: 800

== Competitions ==
=== Major League Soccer ===
==== Standings ====
===== Western Conference =====
Pos	Team	Pld	W	L	T	GF	GA	GD	Pts	Qualification
1	Houston Dynamo	30	13	5	12	45	32	+13	51	Qualification for the conference semifinals
2	Chivas USA	30	12	11	7	40	41	−1	43	Qualification for the conference semifinals
3	Real Salt Lake	30	10	10	10	40	39	+1	40	Qualification for the conference semifinals
4	Colorado Rapids	30	11	14	5	44	45	−1	38	
5	FC Dallas	30	8	10	12	45	41	+4	36	
6	LA Galaxy	30	8	13	9	55	62	−7	33	
7	San Jose Earthquakes	30	8	13	9	32	38	−6	33	

Source: MLS

===== Overall =====
Pos	Team	Pld	W	L	T	GF	GA	GD	Pts	
1	Columbus Crew (C, S)	30	17	7	6	50	36	+14	57	Qualification for the CONCACAF Champions League
2	Houston Dynamo	30	13	5	12	45	32	+13	51	Qualification for the CONCACAF Champions League
3	Chicago Fire	30	13	10	7	44	33	+11	46	Qualification for the North American SuperLiga
4	Chivas USA	30	12	11	7	40	41	−1	43	Qualification for the North American SuperLiga
5	New England Revolution	30	12	11	7	40	43	−3	43	Qualification for the North American SuperLiga
6	Kansas City Wizards	30	11	10	9	37	39	−2	42	Qualification for the North American SuperLiga
7	Real Salt Lake	30	10	10	10	40	39	+1	40	
8	New York Red Bulls	30	10	11	9	42	48	−6	39	Qualification for the CONCACAF Champions League
9	Colorado Rapids	30	11	14	5	44	45	−1	38	
10	D.C. United (U)	30	11	15	4	43	51	−8	37	Qualification for the CONCACAF Champions League
11	FC Dallas	30	8	10	12	45	41	+4	36	
12	Toronto FC	30	9	13	8	34	43	−9	35	Qualification for the CONCACAF Champions League (Note: As winners of the 2009 Canadian Championship)
13	LA Galaxy	30	8	13	9	55	62	−7	33	
14	San Jose Earthquakes	30	8	13	9	32	38	−6	33	

Source: MLS
Rules for classification: 1) points; 2) head-to-head record; 3) goal difference; 4) number of goals scored
(C) MLS Cup champions; (S) Supporters' Shield winners; (U) U.S. Open Cup winners

==== Results summary ====
Overall								Home						Away					
Pld	W	D	L	GF	GA	GD	Pts	W	D	L	GF	GA	GD	W	D	L	GF	GA	GD
30	13	12	5	45	32	+13	51	10	4	1	30	14	+16	3	8	4	15	18	−3

Source: Major League Soccer

==== Results by round ====
Round	1	2	3	4	5	6	7	8	9	10	11	12	13	14	15	16	17	18	19	20	21	22	23	24	25	26	27	28	29	30
Stadium	A	H	A	A	A	H	H	A	A	A	H	A	H	H	A	H	A	H	H	H	A	H	H	A	H	A	A	H	H	A
Result	L	D	D	D	L	D	W	W	L	D	W	W	L	D	D	D	W	W	W	W	L	W	W	D	D	W	D	W	W	D

Source: Houston Dynamo
A = Away; H = Home; W = Win; D = Draw; L = Loss

==== Match results ====
March 29, 2008 1	New England Revolution	3–0	Houston Dynamo	Foxborough, Massachusetts
6:30 PM (CDT)	Ralston 16'; Cristman 32'; Nyassi 90+3'	Report	Mulrooney (yellow card) 58'	Stadium: Gillette Stadium; Attendance: 11,116; Referee: Michael Kennedy

April 6, 2008 2 Texas Derby	Houston Dynamo	3–3	FC Dallas	Houston, Texas
2:00 PM (CDT)	Caraccio 21'; Moor 57' (o.g.); Barrett (yellow card) 72'; Cameron 90+1'	Report	Cooper 35' 45'; Álvarez; Toja (yellow card) 70'	Stadium: Robertson Stadium; Attendance: 20,102; Referee: Abbey Okulaja

April 12, 2008 3	Kansas City Wizards	0–0	Houston Dynamo	Kansas City, Kansas
7:00 PM (CDT)	Morsink (yellow card) 24'; Zavagnin (yellow card) 67'	Report	Clark (yellow card) 15'; Boswell (yellow card) 71'; De Rosario (yellow card) 77'	Stadium: CommunityAmerica Ballpark; Attendance: 9,627; Referee: Baldomero Toledo

April 19, 2008 4	LA Galaxy	2–2	Houston Dynamo	Carson, California
9:30 PM (CDT)	Randolph (yellow card) 25'; Vanney (yellow card) 57'; Landon Donovan 67' 84'	Report	Davis 36'; Caraccio (yellow card) 78' (goal) 79'; Clark (yellow card) 90+2'	Stadium: Home Depot Center; Attendance: 23,401; Referee: Mark Geiger

April 26, 2008 5	Columbus Crew	1–0	Houston Dynamo	Columbus, Ohio
6:30 PM (CDT)	Moreno 22'; Moffat (yellow card) 48'; Hesmer (yellow card) 90+1'; Hejduk (yellow card) 90+6'	Report	Boswell (yellow card) 28'	Stadium: Crew Stadium; Attendance: 15,271; Referee: Terry Vaughn

May 3, 2008 6	Houston Dynamo	0–0	Chivas USA	Houston, Texas
7:30 PM (CDT)	De Rosario (yellow card) 9'; Ianni (yellow card) 12'; Holden (yellow card) 35'; Boswell (yellow card) 52'	Report	Kljestan (yellow card) 13'; Thomas (yellow card) 55'; Galindo (yellow card) 71'; Bornstein (yellow card) 75'; Suárez (red card) 82'	Stadium: Robertson Stadium; Attendance: 20,058; Referee: Jozef Batko

May 10, 2008 7	Houston Dynamo	2–1	Colorado Rapids	Houston, Texas
7:30 PM (CDT)	Mulrooney (yellow card) 28'; Clark (yellow card) 34'; Ching; De Rosario 87' (pen.)	Report	Harvey (yellow card) 41'; McManus (yellow card) 44' (red card) 89'; Cummings 68'; Ihemelu (yellow card) 86'	Stadium: Robertson Stadium; Attendance: 15,024; Referee: Tim Weyland

May 17, 2008 8	Chicago Fire	1–2	Houston Dynamo	Bridgeview, Illinois
7:30 PM (CDT)	Carr 28'; Segares (yellow card) 90+2'; Blanco (yellow card) 90+5'	Report	De Rosario 17' (yellow card) 58'; 45+3 (yellow card); Boswell 82'	Stadium: Toyota Park; Attendance: 17,183; Referee: Paul Ward

May 22, 2008 9	San Jose Earthquakes	2–1	Houston Dynamo	Santa Clara, California
9:30 PM (CDT)	Garcia (yellow card) 35'; Cochrane (yellow card) 40'; Kamara 67'; Guerrero 81'	Report	Ching 88'	Stadium: Buck Shaw Stadium; Attendance: 10,046; Referee: Jair Marrufo

May 28, 2008 10 Texas Derby	FC Dallas	2–2	Houston Dynamo	Frisco, Texas
7:30 PM (CDT)	Cooper 35'; Moor 69'; Sala (yellow card) 74'; Rocha (red card) 80'; Saragosa (yellow card) 80'	Report	Holden (yellow card) 18'; Robinson (yellow card) 57' (yellow-red card) 80'; Ashe 59'; De Rosario 90+3'	Stadium: Pizza Hut Park; Attendance: 8,541; Referee: Alex Prus

May 31, 2008 11	Houston Dynamo	1–0	New York Red Bulls	Houston, Texas
7:30 PM (CDT)	Boswell (yellow card) 65'; Ching 68'; Davis (yellow card) 78'; Cameron (yellow card) 84'	Report	Wolyniec (yellow card) 37'; Borman (yellow card) 60'; Goldthwaite (yellow card) 64'	Stadium: Robertson Stadium; Attendance: 17,204; Referee: Andrew Chapin

June 8, 2008 12	Houston Dynamo	3–1	Toronto FC	Houston, Texas
7:30 PM (CDT)	De Rosario 45+1'; Ching 52' 69'; C. Wondolowski (yellow card) 90+4'	Report	Robinson (yellow card) 53'; Cunningham 71'	Stadium: Robertson Stadium; Attendance: 13,179; Referee: Terry Vaughn

June 12, 2008 13	Houston Dynamo	0–2	New England Revolution	Houston, Texas
8:00 PM (CDT)	Clark (yellow card) 72'; Cameron (yellow card) 74'	Report	Ralston 8'; Dube 35'; Igwe (yellow card) 81'	Stadium: Robertson Stadium; Attendance: 14,655; Referee: Mark Geiger

June 21, 2008 14	Colorado Rapids	0–0	Houston Dynamo	Commerce City, Colorado
8:00 PM (CDT)		Report	Holden (yellow card) 25'; Waibel (yellow card) 34'	Stadium: Dick's Sporting Goods Park; Attendance: 13,220; Referee: Jeff Gontarek

June 26, 2008 15 Texas Derby	Houston Dynamo	1–1	FC Dallas	Houston, Texas
8:00 PM (CDT)	Ching 21'; De Rosario (yellow card) 83'	Report	Cooper 62'; Serioux (yellow card) 68'; Ricchetti (yellow card) 76'; Saragosa (yellow card) 82'	Stadium: Robertson Stadium; Attendance: 16,933; Referee: Kevin Stott

July 3, 2008 16	Real Salt Lake	0–0	Houston Dynamo	Salt Lake City, Utah
9:00 PM (CDT)	Olave (yellow card) 14'; Wingert (red card) 90'	Report	Ianni (yellow card) 56'; Boswell (yellow card) 70'; Barrett (yellow card) 73'; Clark (yellow card) 81'; Ashe (yellow card) 90+2'	Stadium: Rice–Eccles Stadium; Referee: Mark Geiger

July 23, 2008 17	D.C. United	0–2	Houston Dynamo	Washington, D.C.
6:30 PM (CDT)	Dyachenko (yellow card) 45+1'; Martínez (yellow card) 54' (yellow-red card) 83'; Emílio (yellow card) 57'	Report	Robinson (yellow card) 16'; De Rosario (yellow card) 63'; Onstad (yellow card) 77'; Ching 79'	Stadium: RFK Stadium; Attendance: 14,660; Referee: Ricardo Salazar

August 2, 2008 18	Houston Dynamo	2–0	Columbus Crew	Houston, Texas
7:30 PM (CDT)	Davis 13'; Jaqua (yellow card) 29'; Ching 43'	Report	Gaven (yellow card) 32'; Hendrickson (yellow card) 37'	Stadium: Robertson Stadium; Attendance: 15,371; Referee: Steven DePiero

August 16, 2008 19	Houston Dynamo	4–3	Real Salt Lake	Houston, Texas
7:30 PM (CDT)	Mullan 16'; Ching 29' (yellow card) 90+2'; Clark 35'; Jaqua 42'	Report	Movsisyan 3'; Morales 25'; Borchers (yellow card) 30'; Mathis (yellow card) 67'; Deuchar 80'	Stadium: Robertson Stadium; Attendance: 13,579; Referee: Paul Ward

August 20, 2008 20	Houston Dynamo	4–0	Chivas USA	Houston, Texas
8:00 PM (CDT)	Holden 11'; Kamara 22' 35'; Jaqua 28'; Barrett (yellow card) 68'	Report	Suárez (yellow card) 32'; Thomas (yellow card) 39'; Ebert (yellow card) 73'	Stadium: Robertson Stadium; Attendance: 10,908; Referee: Baldomero Toledo

August 24, 2008 21	New York Red Bulls	3–0	Houston Dynamo	East Rutherford, New Jersey
2:00 PM (CDT)	Ángel 8'; Stammler (yellow card) 21'; Richards 26'; Magee 60' (yellow card) 72'; Laitch (yellow card) 76'	Report	Mullan (yellow card) 40'	Stadium: Giants Stadium; Attendance: 12,549; Referee: Edvin Jurisevic

August 31, 2008 22	Houston Dynamo	2–1	Chicago Fire	Houston, Texas
6:00 PM (CDT)	De Rosario 7'; Mullan 39'	Report	McBride 6'; Soumaré (yellow card) 59'; Blanco (yellow card) 62'	Stadium: Robertson Stadium; Attendance: 22,554; Referee: Alex Prus

September 7, 2008 23	Houston Dynamo	3–1	Kansas City Wizards	Houston, Texas
2:00 PM (CDT)	Davis 28'; Jaqua 54' 67'	Report	Marinelli (yellow card) 59'; Arnaud 87'	Stadium: Robertson Stadium; Attendance: 14,297; Referee: Abbey Okulaja

September 13, 2008 24	San Jose Earthquakes	1–1	Houston Dynamo	Santa Clara, California
9:00 PM (CDT)	O'Brien 50'; Riley (yellow card) 69'	Report	Kamara (yellow card) 15'; Mulrooney (yellow card) 31'; Robinson (yellow card) 62' (yellow-red card) 85'; Ching 71'; Mullan (yellow card) 80'; Onstad (yellow card) 90+3'	Stadium: Buck Shaw Stadium; Attendance: 10,526; Referee: Silviu Petrescu

September 27, 2008 25	Toronto FC	1–1	Houston Dynamo	Toronto, Ontario
2:30 PM (CDT)	Brennan (yellow card) 9'; Wynne 73'; Marshall (yellow card) 83'	Report	Boswell (yellow card) 11'; Freeman 23' (o.g.)	Stadium: BMO Field; Attendance: 20,074; Referee: Tim Weyland

October 4, 2008 26	Colorado Rapids	1–3	Houston Dynamo	Commerce City, Colorado
8:30 PM (CDT)	Casey 7' (yellow card) 33' (yellow-red card) 53'	Report	Ching 2' 9'; Clark 19'; Jaqua (yellow card) 73'	Stadium: Dick's Sporting Goods Park; Attendance: 12,496; Referee: Mark Geiger

October 12, 2008 27	Houston Dynamo	0–0	D.C. United	Houston, Texas
6:00 PM (CDT)	De Rosario (yellow card) 53'; Robinson (yellow card) 65'; Cameron (yellow card) 71'; Davis (yellow card) 71'	Report	Namoff (yellow card) 62' (yellow-red card) 73'; McTavish (yellow card) 65'	Stadium: Robertson Stadium; Attendance: 17,531; Referee: Baldomero Toledo

October 15, 2008 28	Houston Dynamo	2–1	San Jose Earthquakes	Houston, Texas
8:00 PM (CDT)	Holden 6' 90+3'; Kamara (red card) 11'; Robinson (yellow card) 61'	Report	Sealy 68'	Stadium: Robertson Stadium; Attendance: 12,327; Referee: Jair Marrufo

October 18, 2008 29	Houston Dynamo	3–0	LA Galaxy	Houston, Texas
7:30 PM (CDT)	Jordan 14' (o.g.); De Rosario 20'; Ching 23'	Report	Pires (yellow card) 86'; Roberts (yellow card) 88'	Stadium: Robertson Stadium; Attendance: 30,361; Referee: Mark Geiger

October 25, 2008 30	Chivas USA	1–1	Houston Dynamo	Carson, California
9:30 PM (CDT)	Kennedy (red card) 50'; Curtin 90'	Report	Ching (yellow card) 14'; De Rosario 52' (pen.)	Stadium: Home Depot Center; Attendance: 18,165; Referee: Terry Vaughn

=== MLS Cup Playoffs ===
November 1, 2008 Conference semifinals	New York Red Bulls	1–1	Houston Dynamo	East Rutherford, New Jersey
3:00 PM (CDT)	Richards (yellow card) 29'; Angel (yellow card) 37' (goal) 48'	Report	Mullan (yellow card) 53'; Kamara 85'	Stadium: Giants Stadium; Attendance: 11,578; Referee: Kevin Stott

November 9, 2008 Conference semifinals	Houston Dynamo	0–3 (1–4 agg.)	New York Red Bulls	Houston, Texas
2:00 PM (CST)	Robinson (yellow card) 62'; Onstad (yellow card) 69'; Mullan (yellow card) 73'	Report	van den Bergh (yellow card) 5'; Richards 25'; Goldthwaite (yellow card) 28'; Angel 36' (pen.); Sassano (yellow card) 45+2'; Wolyniec 81'	Stadium: Robertson Stadium; Attendance: 30,053; Referee: Baldomero Toledo

=== U.S. Open Cup ===
July 1, 2008 Third round	Charleston Battery (North Carolina)	1–1 (a.e.t.) (4–3 p)	(Texas) Houston Dynamo	Charleston, South Carolina
6:30 PM (CDT)	Armstrong (yellow card) 17'; Reda 31' (yellow card) 78' (yellow-red card) 103'; Corcoran (red card) 78'; Spicer (yellow card) 109'	Report	Ustruck (yellow card) 30'; C. Wondolowski (yellow card) 33'; S. Wondolowski (yellow card) 39' (goal) 89'; Caraccio (yellow card) 95'; Holden (yellow card) 11'	Stadium: Blackbaud Stadium; Attendance: 3,103; Referee: Joe Caroccio
	Penalties
	Alonso (penalty scored); Armstrong (penalty scored); Spicer (penalty scored); Velten (penalty scored)		(penalty scored) Holden; (penalty scored) C. Wondolowski; (penalty missed) Cameron; (penalty scored) Hayden; (penalty missed) Caraccio

=== CONCACAF Champions' Cup ===
==== Quarterfinals ====
March 12, 2008 First leg	Municipal (Guatemala)	0–0	(United States) Houston Dynamo	Guatemala City, Guatemala
9:00 PM (CDT)	Ramírez (yellow card) 90+3'	Report	Barrett (yellow card) 47'	Stadium: Estadio Mateo Flores; Attendance: 22,250; Referee: Edgar Rodriguez

March 19, 2008 Second leg	Houston Dynamo (United States)	3–1 (3–1 agg.)	(Guatemala) Municipal	Houston, Texas
7:30 PM (CDT)	Boswell (yellow card) 32'; De Rosario 47' 69' (pen.) (yellow card) 72'; C. Wondolowski (yellow card) 72' (goal) 75'	Report	Melgar (yellow card) 43'; Thompson (yellow card) 72'; Ponciano (yellow card) 72'; Ramírez 86' (pen.); Rodríguez (yellow card) 90+3'	Stadium: Robertson Stadium; Attendance: 14,348; Referee: Mauricio Morales

==== Semifinals ====
April 2, 2008 First leg	Houston Dynamo (United States)	0–0	(Costa Rica) Deportivo Saprissa	Houston, Texas
8:00 PM (CDT)	Boswell (yellow card) 70'	Report	Barrantes (yellow card) 89'	Stadium: Robertson Stadium; Attendance: 10,260; Referee: Courtney Campbell

April 9, 2008 Second leg	Deportivo Saprissa (Costa Rica)	3–0 (3–0 agg.)	(United States) Houston Dynamo	San José, Costa Rica
9:00 PM (CDT)	Alonso 35'; Borges 49'; Arrieta 77'	Report	Clark (yellow card) 90'	Stadium: Estadio Ricardo Saprissa; Attendance: 23,112; Referee: Marco Rodriguez

=== North American SuperLiga ===
Team	Pts	Pld	W	D	L	GF	GA	GD
(United States) Houston Dynamo	6	3	2	0	1	7	2	+5
(Mexico) Atlante	6	3	2	0	1	5	6	−1
(Mexico) Guadalajara	6	3	2	0	1	3	3	0
(United States) D.C. United	0	3	0	0	3	4	8	−4

July 12, 2008 Group stage	Houston Dynamo (United States)	4–0	(Mexico) Atlante	Houston, Texas
9:00 PM (CDT)	Ianni (yellow card) 17'; De Rosario 20' (red card) 44'; Holden 21' 28'; Mullan 54'; Cameron (yellow card) 60'	Report	Ovalle (yellow card) 32'; Muñoz (red card) 44'	Stadium: Robertson Stadium; Attendance: 13,105; Referee: Courtney Campbell

July 15, 2008 Group stage	Houston Dynamo (United States)	0–1	(Mexico) C.D. Guadalajara	Houston, Texas
9:00 PM (CDT)	Clark (yellow card) 19'; Ashe (yellow card) 36'; Barrett (yellow card) 88'	Report	Pineda (yellow card) 19'; Ávila (yellow card) 27'; Reynoso (yellow card) 53'; Arellano 71'	Stadium: Robertson Stadium; Attendance: 28,723; Referee: Enrico Wijngaarde

July 19, 2008 Group stage	D.C. United (United States)	1–3	(United States) Houston Dynamo	Washington, D.C.
7:00 PM (CDT)	Fred (yellow card) 20'; Emílio (yellow card) 21'; Doe 76'; Dyachenko (yellow card) 81'	Report	Clark 12'; Boswell 28'; Holden 84'	Stadium: RFK Stadium; Attendance: 12,893; Referee: Alex Prus

July 29, 2008 Semifinals	Houston Dynamo (United States)	2–0	(Mexico) Pachuca	Houston, Texas
9:00 PM (CDT)	Clark (yellow card) 36'; Boswell 77'; Ashe 87'	Report	Torres (yellow card) 32'; López (yellow card) 33'; Alvarez (yellow card) 86'; Marioni (yellow card) 90'; Aguilar (yellow card) 90+4'	Stadium: Robertson Stadium; Attendance: 16,679; Referee: Neil Brizan

August 5, 2008 Final	New England Revolution (United States)	2–2 (a.e.t.) (6–5 p)	(United States) Houston Dynamo	Foxborough, Massachusetts
PM (CDT)	Ralston 41'; Joseph (yellow card) 82' (goal) 102'	Report	Davis (yellow card) 14'; Jaqua 18'; Kamara 98'	Stadium: Gillette Stadium; Attendance: 9,242; Referee: Howard Webb
	Penalties
	Ralston (penalty scored); Reis (penalty missed); Joseph (penalty scored); Twellman (penalty scored); Smith (penalty missed); Larentowicz (penalty scored); Tierney (penalty scored); Albright (penalty scored)		(penalty scored) Waibel; (penalty scored) Wondolowski; (penalty missed) De Rosario; (penalty missed) Ching; (penalty scored) Clark; (penalty scored) Barrett; (penalty scored) Kamara; (penalty missed) Ashe

=== CONCACAF Champions League ===
==== Group stage ====
Club	Pld	W	D	L	GF	GA	GD	Pts
(Mexico) UNAM	6	3	3	0	18	7	+11	12
(United States) Houston Dynamo	6	2	3	1	9	9	0	9
(El Salvador) Luis Ángel Firpo	6	2	2	2	6	8	−2	8
(Panama) San Francisco	6	0	2	4	4	13	−9	2

	HOU	LAF	SFR	UNAM
Houston Dynamo	–	1–0	2–1	1–3
Luis Ángel Firpo	1–1	–	1–0	1–1
San Francisco	0–0	2–3	–	1–1
UNAM	4–4	3–0	6–0	–

September 23, 2008 1	San Francisco (Panama)	0–0	(United States) Houston Dynamo	Panama City, Panama
9:00 PM (CDT)		Report	Cameron (yellow card) 6'; Ashe (yellow card) 62'	Stadium: Estadio Nacional Rod Carew, Attendance: 3,400; Referee: Geoffrey Hospedales

September 30, 2008 2	U.N.A.M. (Mexico)	4–4	(United States) Houston Dynamo	Mexico City, Mexico
9:00 PM (CDT)	López 18'; Juárez 26'; Palencia 41'; Verón 45+2'	Report	Waibel 3' 50'; Kamara 16' 33' (pen.); Robinson (yellow card) 26'	Stadium: Estadio Olímpico Universitario; Attendance: 9,179; Referee: Walter Quesada

October 7, 2008 3	Houston Dynamo (United States)	2–1	(Panama) San Francisco	Houston, Texas
9:00 PM (CDT)	C. Wondolowski 13'; Mulrooney (yellow card) 74'; De Rosario 88'	Report	Perez 47'; M. Torres (yellow card) 60'; W. Torres (yellow card) 90+1'; Lombardo (yellow card) 90+2'	Stadium: Robertson Stadium; Attendance: 4,178; Referee: Benito Archundia

October 22, 2008 4	Houston Dynamo (United States)	1–3	(Mexico) U.N.A.M.	Houston, Texas
9:00 PM (CDT)	Palacios 38' (o.g.); Holden (yellow card) 43'	Report	Cacho 19' (pen.); Cabrera (yellow card) 24'; Espinosa 30'; Íñiguez (yellow card) 32'; Palacios 69', (yellow card) 81'; Fuentes (yellow card) 70'; Bravo (yellow card) 71'	Stadium: Robertson Stadium; Attendance: 8,741; Referee: Neal Brizan

October 28, 2008 5	Luis Ángel Firpo (El Salvador)	1–1	(United States) Houston Dynamo	San Salvador, El Salvador
9:00 PM (CDT)	Campos (yellow card) 66'; Leguizamón 87'	Report	Holden 16' (yellow card) 37'; Cameron (yellow card) 39'; Hayden (yellow card) 50'; Caig (yellow card) 90+2'	Stadium: Estadio Cuscatlán; Attendance: 3,000; Referee: Jorge Gasso

November 26, 2008 6	Houston Dynamo (United States)	1–0	(El Salvador) Luis Ángel Firpo	Houston, Texas
9:00 PM (CST)	Ching 13'; Waibel (yellow card) 32'; De Rosario (yellow card) 43'; Mullan (yellow card) 45'; Kamara (yellow card) 77'; Robinson (red card) 82'	Report	Pekarnik (yellow card) 32'; Monteagudo (yellow card) 76'; Calderón (yellow card) 86' (yellow-red card) 91'; Morales (yellow card) 91'	Stadium: Robertson Stadium; Attendance: 14,142; Referee: Roberto Garcia

==== Championship round ====
After finishing 2nd in group B, the Dynamo qualified for the Championship Round. The fixtures for the Championship Round are included in the Dynamo's 2009 season.

== Player statistics ==
=== Appearances, goals, and assists ===
No.	Pos.	Nat.	Player	Total			MLS			Playoffs			U.S. Open Cup			Champions Cup			SuperLiga			Champions League		
No.	Pos.	Nat.	Player	App	G	A	App	G	A	App	G	A	App	G	A	App	G	A	App	G	A	App	G	A
1	GK	(England)	Tony Caig	11	0	0	7	0	0	0	0	0	1	0	0	1	0	0	0	0	0	2	0	0
2	DF	(United States)	Eddie Robinson	29	0	0	20	0	0	2	0	0	0	0	0	3	0	0	1	0	0	3	0	0
3	MF	(United States)	Johnny Alcaraz	1	0	0	0	0	0	0	0	0	1	0	0	0	0	0	0	0	0	0	0	0
4	DF	(United States)	Patrick Ianni	27	0	1	17	0	1	0	0	0	0	0	0	2	0	0	3	0	0	5	0	0
5	FW	(United States)	Kyle Brown	8	0	0	4	0	0	0	0	0	1	0	0	0	0	0	1	0	0	2	0	0
6	MF	(United States)	Erik Ustruck	3	0	0	0	0	0	0	0	0	1	0	0	0	0	0	0	0	0	2	0	0
7	FW	(United States)	Chris Wondolowski	19	2	0	8	0	0	0	0	0	1	0	0	4	1	0	4	0	0	2	1	0
8	MF	(United States)	Richard Mulrooney	33	0	4	23	0	4	2	0	0	0	0	0	4	0	0	0	0	0	4	0	0
9	MF	(United States)	Brian Mullan	44	4	8	30	3	5	2	0	0	0	0	0	3	0	0	5	1	2	4	0	1
10	FW	(Sierra Leone)	Kei Kamara	19	6	2	10	2	2	2	1	0	0	0	0	0	0	0	2	1	0	5	2	0
10	FW	(Argentina)	Franco Caraccio (Note: Left during the season)	17	2	2	10	2	1	0	0	0	1	0	1	4	0	0	2	0	0	0	0	0
11	MF	(United States)	Brad Davis	35	3	11	26	3	8	2	0	0	0	0	0	1	0	0	5	0	3	1	0	0
13	MF	(United States)	Ricardo Clark	41	3	1	25	2	1	2	0	0	0	0	0	4	0	0	5	1	0	5	0	0
14	MF	(Canada)	Dwayne De Rosario	39	11	5	24	7	2	2	0	0	0	0	0	4	2	0	4	1	2	5	1	1
16	DF	(United States)	Craig Waibel	26	2	4	14	0	3	0	0	0	0	0	0	3	0	0	5	0	1	4	2	0
17	MF	(United States)	Mike Chabala	5	0	0	0	0	0	0	0	0	1	0	0	0	0	0	1	0	0	3	0	0
18	GK	(Canada)	Pat Onstad	38	0	0	24	0	0	2	0	0	0	0	0	3	0	0	5	0	0	4	0	0
19	MF	(United States)	John Michael Hayden	2	0	0	0	0	0	0	0	0	1	0	0	0	0	0	0	0	0	1	0	0
20	MF	(United States)	Geoff Cameron	36	1	5	23	1	2	1	0	0	1	0	0	2	0	0	5	0	2	4	0	1
21	FW	(United States)	Nick Hatzke	1	0	0	0	0	0	0	0	0	1	0	0	0	0	0	0	0	0	0	0	0
22	MF	(United States)	Stuart Holden	37	7	6	27	3	4	2	0	0	1	0	0	0	0	0	2	3	0	5	1	1
23	MF	(United States)	Stephen Wondolowski	2	1	0	0	0	0	0	0	0	1	1	0	0	0	0	0	0	0	1	0	0
24	DF	(United States)	Wade Barrett	41	0	1	26	0	0	2	0	0	0	0	0	4	0	0	5	0	1	4	0	0
25	FW	(United States)	Brian Ching	35	14	7	25	13	5	2	0	0	0	0	0	4	0	0	2	0	2	2	1	0
26	MF	(United States)	Corey Ashe	39	2	4	22	1	1	1	0	0	1	0	0	4	0	1	5	1	0	6	0	2
27	MF	(United States)	Nate Jaqua	23	5	4	14	4	4	2	0	0	0	0	0	0	0	0	2	1	0	5	0	0
30	GK	(United States)	Corbin Waller	0	0	0	0	0	0	0	0	0	0	0	0	0	0	0	0	0	0	0	0	0
32	DF	(United States)	Bobby Boswell	43	3	1	29	1	1	2	0	0	0	0	0	3	0	0	5	2	0	4	0	0
99	FW	(Ivory Coast)	Guy-Roland Kpene	0	0	0	0	0	0	0	0	0	0	0	0	0	0	0	0	0	0	0	0	0

Source: Season Statistics and match reports in Competitions

=== Disciplinary record ===
No.	Pos.	Nat.	Player	Total		MLS		Playoffs		U.S. Open Cup		Champions Cup		SuperLiga		Champions League	
No.	Pos.	Nat.	Player	Yellow card	Red card	Yellow card	Red card	Yellow card	Red card	Yellow card	Red card	Yellow card	Red card	Yellow card	Red card	Yellow card	Red card
1	GK	(England)	Tony Caig	1	0	0	0	0	0	0	0	0	0	0	0	1	0
2	DF	(United States)	Eddie Robinson	9	3	6	2	2	0	0	0	0	0	0	0	1	1
3	MF	(United States)	Johnny Alcaraz	0	0	0	0	0	0	0	0	0	0	0	0	0	0
4	DF	(United States)	Patrick Ianni	3	0	2	0	0	0	0	0	0	0	1	0	0	0
5	FW	(United States)	Kyle Brown	0	0	0	0	0	0	0	0	0	0	0	0	0	0
6	MF	(United States)	Erik Ustruck	1	0	0	0	0	0	1	0	0	0	0	0	0	0
7	FW	(United States)	Chris Wondolowski	3	0	1	0	0	0	1	0	1	0	0	0	0	0
8	MF	(United States)	Richard Mulrooney	4	0	3	0	0	0	0	0	0	0	0	0	1	0
9	MF	(United States)	Brian Mullan	5	0	2	0	2	0	0	0	0	0	0	0	1	0
10	FW	(Sierra Leone)	Kei Kamara	2	1	1	1	0	0	0	0	0	0	0	0	1	0
10	FW	(Argentina)	Franco Caraccio (Note: Left during the season)	2	0	1	0	0	0	1	0	0	0	0	0	0	0
11	MF	(United States)	Brad Davis	3	0	2	0	0	0	0	0	0	0	1	0	0	0
13	MF	(United States)	Ricardo Clark	9	0	6	0	0	0	0	0	1	0	2	0	0	0
14	MF	(Canada)	Dwayne De Rosario	8	1	6	0	0	0	0	0	1	0	0	1	1	0
16	DF	(United States)	Craig Waibel	2	0	1	0	0	0	0	0	0	0	0	0	1	0
17	MF	(United States)	Mike Chabala	0	0	0	0	0	0	0	0	0	0	0	0	0	0
18	GK	(Canada)	Pat Onstad	3	0	2	0	1	0	0	0	0	0	0	0	0	0
19	MF	(United States)	John Michael Hayden	1	0	0	0	0	0	0	0	0	0	0	0	1	0
20	MF	(United States)	Geoff Cameron	6	0	3	0	0	0	0	0	0	0	1	0	2	0
21	FW	(United States)	Nick Hatzke	0	0	0	0	0	0	0	0	0	0	0	0	0	0
22	MF	(United States)	Stuart Holden	6	0	3	0	0	0	1	0	0	0	0	0	2	0
23	MF	(United States)	Stephen Wondolowski	1	0	0	0	0	0	1	0	0	0	0	0	0	0
24	DF	(United States)	Wade Barrett	5	0	3	0	0	0	0	0	1	0	1	0	0	0
25	FW	(United States)	Brian Ching	2	0	2	0	0	0	0	0	0	0	0	0	0	0
26	MF	(United States)	Corey Ashe	3	0	1	0	0	0	0	0	0	0	1	0	1	0
27	MF	(United States)	Nate Jaqua	2	0	2	0	0	0	0	0	0	0	0	0	0	0
30	GK	(United States)	Corbin Waller	0	0	0	0	0	0	0	0	0	0	0	0	0	0
32	DF	(United States)	Bobby Boswell	8	0	6	0	0	0	0	0	2	0	0	0	0	0
99	FW	(Ivory Coast)	Guy-Roland Kpene	0	0	0	0	0	0	0	0	0	0	0	0	0	0

Source: Season Statistics and match reports in Competitions

=== Clean sheets ===
Rank	Nat.	Player	MLS	Playoffs	U.S. Open Cup	Champions Cup	SuperLiga	Champions League	Total
1	(Canada)	Pat Onstad	7	0	0	2	2	2	13
2	(England)	Tony Caig	3	0	0	0	0	0	3
Total			10	0	0	2	2	2	16

Source: Season Statistics and match reports in Competitions

== Honors and awards ==
=== MLS Player of the Week ===
Week	Player	Ref.
11	(United States) Brian Ching	
28	(United States) Brian Ching	

=== MLS Goal of the Week ===
Week	Player	Opponent	Date
2	(United States) Geoff Cameron	FC Dallas	April 6

=== Annual ===
Honor	Player	Ref.
MLS All-Star	(United States) Brian Ching (Canada) Dwayne De Rosario (Canada) Pat Onstad	

=== Dynamo team awards ===
MVP	Defensive Player of the Year	Humanitarian of the Year	Young Player of the Year	Newcomer of the Year	Ref.
(United States) Brian Ching	(United States) Bobby Boswell	(United States) Stuart Holden	(United States) Stuart Holden	(United States) Geoff Cameron	

== Kits ==
Supplier: Adidas / Sponsor: Amigo Energy

Home	Away
