= 2009 Houston Dynamo season =

Houston Dynamo
2009 season
- Owner: Philip Anschutz (AEG)
- President COO: Oliver Luck; Chris Canetti
- Head coach: Dominic Kinnear
- Stadium: Robertson Stadium
- Major League Soccer: Conference: 2nd Overall: 3rd
- MLS Cup Playoffs: Conference Finals
- U.S. Open Cup: Semifinals
- 2008–09 CONCACAF Champions League: Quarterfinals
- 2009–10 CONCACAF Champions League: Group stage
- Top goalscorer: League: Brian Ching: 8 goals All: Brian Ching: 10 goals
- Average home league attendance: 17,624
Home colors	Away colors

The 2009 Houston Dynamo season was the fourth season of existence for the Houston franchise since joining Major League Soccer (MLS) prior to the 2006 season. It was the team's fourth season with head coach Dominic Kinnear, majority owner Philip Anschultz, president Oliver Luck, and chief operating officer Chris Canetti.

The Dynamo qualified for the MLS Cup Playoffs for the fourth consecutive year after finishing 2nd in the Western Conference during the regular season. In the playoffs, Houston defeated the Seattle Sounders FC 1–0 over two legs in the Conference Semifinals before losing 2–0 to the Los Angeles Galaxy in the Conference Final. In the U.S. Open Cup, the Dynamo reached the semifinals, where they lost 2–1 to the eventual champion Seattle Sounders. The Dynamo also competed in the CONCACAF Champions League, losing to Atlante 4–1 on aggregate in the quarterfinals of the 2008–09 Champions League while also finishing third in their group for the 2009–10 Champions League, failing to advance.

== Final roster ==
As of November 14, 2009.

Appearances and goals are totals for MLS regular season only.

No.	Name	Nationality	Position	Date of birth (Age)	Joined from	Joined in	Apps.	Goals
Goalkeepers
1	Tally Hall	(United States)	GK	May 12, 1985 (24)	Esbjerg fB	2009	0	0
18	Pat Onstad	(Canada)	GK	January 13, 1968 (41)	San Jose Earthquakes	2006	113	0
30	Tyler Deric (HGP)	(United States)	GK	August 30, 1988 (21)	Houston Dynamo Academy	2009	0	0
Defenders
2	Eddie Robinson	(United States)	DF	June 19, 1978 (31)	San Jose Earthquakes	2006	71	4
4	Ryan Cochrane	(United States)	DF	August 8, 1983 (26)	San Jose Earthquakes	2009	58	2
16	Craig Waibel	(United States)	DF	August 21, 1975 (34)	San Jose Earthquakes	2006	76	6
20	Geoff Cameron	(United States)	DF	July 11, 1985 (24)	University of Rhode Island	2008	52	3
24	Wade Barrett (C)	(United States)	DF	June 23, 1976 (33)	San Jose Earthquakes	2006	99	0
31	André Hainault	(Canada)	DF	June 17, 1986 (23)	FK Baník Most	2009	20	1
32	Bobby Boswell	(United States)	DF	March 15, 1983 (26)	D.C. United	2008	58	2
Midfielders
5	Danny Cruz (GA)	(United States)	MF	January 3, 1990 (19)	UNLV	2009	6	0
6	Erik Ustruck	(United States)	MF	January 4, 1985 (24)	Santa Clara University	2007	2	0
8	Richard Mulrooney	(United States)	MF	November 3, 1976 (33)	Toronto FC	2007	65	1
9	Brian Mullan	(United States)	MF	April 23, 1978 (31)	San Jose Earthquakes	2006	114	6
11	Brad Davis	(United States)	MF	November 8, 1981 (28)	San Jose Earthquakes	2006	98	12
13	Ricardo Clark	(United States)	MF	February 10, 1983 (26)	San Jose Earthquakes	2006	97	7
17	Mike Chabala	(United States)	MF	May 24, 1984 (25)	University of Washington	2006	15	0
19	John Michael Hayden	(United States)	MF	April 27, 1984 (25)	Indiana University	2007	0	0
22	Stuart Holden	(United States)	MF	August 1, 1985 (24)	Sunderland A.F.C.	2006	88	15
26	Corey Ashe	(United States)	MF	March 14, 1986 (23)	University of North Carolina	2007	71	1
Forwards
7	Luis Ángel Landín (DP)	(Mexico)	FW	July 23, 1985 (24)	Monarcas Morelia	2009	7	1
10	Abe Thompson	(United States)	FW	January 12, 1982 (27)	Kansas City Wizards	2009	1	0
15	Cam Weaver	(United States)	FW	June 10, 1983 (26)	San Jose Earthquakes	2009	8	3
23	Dominic Oduro	(Ghana)	FW	August 13, 1985 (24)	New York Red Bulls	2009	16	1
25	Brian Ching	(United States)	FW	May 24, 1978 (31)	San Jose Earthquakes	2006	85	39

== Player movement ==
=== In ===
Per Major League Soccer and club policies terms of the deals do not get disclosed.

Date	Player	Position	Age	Previous club	Notes	Ref
December 12, 2008	(Trinidad and Tobago) Julius James	DF	24	(Canada) Toronto FC	Acquired along with allocation money in exchange for Dwayne De Rosario.	
January 23, 2009	(United States) Tally Hall	GK	23	(Denmark) Esbjerg fB	Signed on a free transfer.	
January 29, 2009	(United States) Felix Garcia	FW	18	(United States) Laredo Heat	Signed as a Generation Adidas player. An undisclosed fee was given to the Laredo Heat. Houston traded an international roster slot for two years and swapped allocation ranking spots to Toronto FC for the right to sign him.	
February 27, 2009	(United States) Tyler Deric	GK	20	(United States) Houston Dynamo Academy	Signed as a homegrown player.	
March 30, 2009	(Nigeria) Ade Akinbiyi	FW	34	(England) Burnley	Signed on a free transfer.	
April 14, 2009	(Canada) André Hainault	DF	22	(Czech Republic) Baník Most	Full transfer, fee undisclosed.	
May 27, 2009	(Ghana) Dominic Oduro	FW	23	(United States) New York Red Bulls	Acquired in exchange for a first round pick in the 2010 MLS SuperDraft and a 2nd round pick in the 2011 MLS SuperDraft.	
June 9, 2009	(United States) Cam Weaver	FW	25	(United States) San Jose Earthquakes	Acquired in exchange for Chris Wondolowski and a conditional pick in the 2010 MLS SuperDraft.	
August 14, 2009	(United States) Ryan Cochrane	DF	26	(United States) San Jose Earthquakes	Acquired in exchange for an international roster slot through the end of the 2010 season.	
September 15, 2009	(United States) Abe Thompson	FW	27	(United States) Kansas City Wizards	Acquired along with allocation money in exchange for Kei Kamara.	

=== Out ===
Per Major League Soccer and club policies terms of the deals do not get disclosed.

Date	Player	Position	Age	Destination Club	Notes	Ref
November 26, 2008	(United States) Nate Jaqua	FW	27	(United States) Seattle Sounders FC	Selected in the 2008 MLS Expansion Draft.	
December 12, 2008	(Canada) Dwayne De Rosario	MF	30	(Canada) Toronto FC	Traded for Julius James and allocation money.	
December 2008	(United States) Johnny Alcaraz	MF	23	Retired	Released following the 2008 season.	
December 2008	(United States) Kyle Brown	FW	25	(United States) Austin Aztex	Released following the 2008 season.	
December 2008	(England) Tony Caig	GK	34	(England) Chesterfield	Released following the 2008 season.	
December 2008	(United States) Nick Hatzke	MF	25	Retired	Released following the 2008 season.	
December 2008	(Ivory Coast) Guy-Roland Kpene	FW	25	(United States) Long Island Rough Riders	Released following the 2008 season.	
December 2008	(United States) Corbin Waller	GK	23	(United States) Charlotte Eagles	Released following the 2008 season.	
December 2008	(United States) Stephen Wondolowski	DF	23	Retired	Released following the 2008 season.	
January 26, 2009	(United States) Patrick Ianni	DF	23	(United States) Seattle Sounders FC	Traded for a conditional pick in the 2010 MLS SuperDraft.	
February 5, 2009	(United States) Felix Garcia	FW	18	(United States) Laredo Heat	Garcia left Houston after a week, returning to Laredo to finish school. The Dynamo retained his MLS rights, but he no longer occupied a roster spot. Reportedly, he skipped a team meeting and a mandatory physical, and left practice early prior to the announcement of his departure. He did not return to the team, even after graduating from high school.	
June 9, 2009	(United States) Chris Wondolowski	FW	25	(United States) San Jose Earthquakes	Traded along with a conditional pick in the 2010 MLS SuperDraft for Cam Weaver.	
August 14, 2009	(Trinidad and Tobago) Julius James	DF	25	(United States) D.C. United	Traded for a third round pick in the 2012 MLS SuperDraft.	
August 20, 2009	(Nigeria) Ade Akinbiyi	FW	34	(England) Notts County	Released	
September 15, 2009	(Sierra Leone) Kei Kamara	ST	25	(United States) Kansas City Wizards	Traded for Abe Thompson and allocation money.	

=== Loans in ===
Date	Player	Position	Age	Loaned From	Notes	Ref
August 20, 2009	(Mexico) Luis Ángel Landín	FW	24	(Mexico) Monarcas Morelia	Signed on a 16-month loan as a Designated Player.	

=== Loans out ===
Date	Player	Position	Age	Loaned To	Notes	Ref
May 8, 2009	(United States) Tyler Deric	GK	20	(United States) Austin Aztex	Multiple short-term loans throughout the season	
May 9, 2009	(United States) John Michael Hayden	MF	25	(United States) Cleveland City Stars	Loaned until June 9, 2009	
June 13, 2009	(Trinidad and Tobago) Julius James	DF	24	(United States) Minnesota Thunder	Loaned until July 29, 2009	
June 16, 2009	(United States) Mike Chabala	DF	25	(United States) Austin Aztex	Loaned until June 22, 2009	
June 16, 2009	(United States) Eric Ustruck	MF	24	(United States) Austin Aztex	Loaned until June 22, 2009	

=== MLS SuperDraft ===
Round	Pick	Player	Position	Age	College	Notes	Ref
3	40	(United States) Danny Cruz	MF	19	UNLV	Signed to a Generation Adidas contract.	
4	56	(United States) Marcus Tracy	FW	22	Wake Forest	Signed with AaB Fodbold.	

== Coaching staff ==
As of November 14, 2009.

Position	Name
Head coach	(United States) Dominic Kinnear
Assistant coach	(Scotland) John Spencer
Goalkeeper coach	(United States) Tim Hanley
Head athletic trainer	(United States) Theron Enns
Assistant athletic trainer	(United States) Shane Caron
Team administrator	(United States) Nick Kowba
Equipment manager	(United States) Michael Porter

== Pre-season ==
=== Friendlies ===
Win Tie Loss

February 6, 2009	Houston Dynamo	3–0	FC Dallas	Houston, Texas
	Wondolowskir 6'; Waibel 14' (yellow card) 37'; James 34' (yellow card) 62'; Mullan (red card) 66'	Report	Chevannes (yellow card) 52'; Shea (red card) 66'	Stadium: Robertson Stadium

February 9, 2009	FC Dallas	0–0	Houston Dynamo	Frisco, Texas
10:00 AM CST		Report		Stadium: Pizza Hut Park

February 12, 2009	Los Angeles Galaxy	2–0	Houston Dynamo	Carson, California
1:00 PM CST		Report	Sanneh 2' (o.g.); Mullan 14'	Stadium: Home Depot Center

February 15, 2009	San Jose Earthquakes	0–2	Houston Dynamo	San Luis Obispo, California
5:00 PM CST	Weaver 61'; Johnson 69'	Report	Robinson (yellow card) 55'; Kamara (red card) 74'; Boswell (yellow card) 75'	Stadium: Alex G. Spanos Stadium; Attendance: 1,587

February 18, 2009	Hammarby IF	0–0	Houston Dynamo	Carson, California
1:00 PM CST		Report		Stadium: Home Depot Center

February 28, 2009	Houston Dynamo	3–2	Montreal Impact	Houston, Texas
10:30 AM CST	Wondolowskir 7'; Ching 47' 54'	Report	Brown 37' (red card) ?'; Byers ?'	Stadium: Robertson Stadium

March 7, 2009	Austin Aztex	2–2	Houston Dynamo	Austin, Texas
7:30 PM CST	Johnson (yellow card) 11'; Silva 21'; Noel-Williams (yellow card) 33' (yellow-red card) 39'; Barrett 46'; Key (yellow card) 70'	Report	James (yellow card) 4'; Mullan 34'; Quill 48'	Stadium: Nelson Field; Attendance: 4,177

March 13, 2009	Chivas USA	2–2	Houston Dynamo	Carson, California
9:00 PM CDT	Harris 43'; Thomas 63'	Report	Wondolowski 46'; Davis 76'	Stadium: Home Depot Center

== Competitions ==
=== Major League Soccer ===
==== Standings ====
===== Western Conference =====
Pos	Team	Pld	W	L	T	GF	GA	GD	Pts	Qualification
1	LA Galaxy	30	12	6	12	36	31	+5	48	MLS Cup Playoffs
2	Houston Dynamo	30	13	8	9	39	29	+10	48	MLS Cup Playoffs
3	Seattle Sounders FC	30	12	7	11	38	29	+9	47	MLS Cup Playoffs
4	Chivas USA	30	13	11	6	34	31	+3	45	MLS Cup Playoffs
5	Real Salt Lake	30	11	12	7	43	35	+8	40	MLS Cup Playoffs
6	Colorado Rapids	30	10	10	10	42	38	+4	40	
7	FC Dallas	30	11	13	6	50	47	+3	39	
8	San Jose Earthquakes	30	7	14	9	36	50	−14	30	

Source: MLS

===== Overall =====
Pos	Team	Pld	W	L	T	GF	GA	GD	Pts	Qualification
1	Columbus Crew (S)	30	13	7	10	41	31	+10	49	CONCACAF Champions League
2	LA Galaxy	30	12	6	12	36	31	+5	48	CONCACAF Champions League
3	Houston Dynamo	30	13	8	9	39	29	+10	48	North American SuperLiga
4	Seattle Sounders FC	30	12	7	11	38	29	+9	47	CONCACAF Champions League
5	Chicago Fire	30	11	7	12	39	34	+5	45	North American SuperLiga
6	Chivas USA	30	13	11	6	34	31	+3	45	North American SuperLiga
7	New England Revolution	30	11	10	9	33	37	−4	42	North American SuperLiga
8	Real Salt Lake (C)	30	11	12	7	43	35	+8	40	CONCACAF Champions League
9	Colorado Rapids	30	10	10	10	42	38	+4	40	
10	D.C. United	30	9	8	13	43	44	−1	40	
11	FC Dallas	30	11	13	6	50	47	+3	39	
12	Toronto FC	30	10	11	9	37	46	−9	39	CONCACAF Champions League
13	Kansas City Wizards	30	8	13	9	33	42	−9	33	
14	San Jose Earthquakes	30	7	14	9	36	50	−14	30	
15	New York Red Bulls	30	5	19	6	27	47	−20	21	

Source: MLS
Rules for classification: 1) points; 2) head-to-head record; 3) goal difference; 4) number of goals scored
(C) Champions; (S) Supporters' Shield

==== Results summary ====
Overall								Home						Away					
Pld	Pts	W	L	T	GF	GA	GD	W	L	T	GF	GA	GD	W	L	T	GF	GA	GD
30	48	13	8	9	39	29	+10	8	1	6	23	13	+10	5	7	3	16	16	0

Last updated: October 25, 2009
Source: Major League Soccer
Pld = Matches played; Pts = Points; W = Matches won; T = Matches tied; L = Matches lost; GF = Goals for; GA = Goals against; GD = Goal difference

==== Results by round ====
Round	1	2	3	4	5	6	7	8	9	10	11	12	13	14	15	16	17	18	19	20	21	22	23	24	25	26	27	28	29	30
Stadium	H	A	A	H	H	H	H	A	H	H	A	H	A	H	A	A	A	A	H	H	A	H	A	H	A	A	H	H	H	A
Result	T	L	L	T	W	W	W	T	W	W	W	W	W	T	L	W	L	T	L	W	L	W	T	T	L	L	W	T	T	W

Updated to match(es) played on October 25, 2009. Source: Houston Dynamo
A = Away; H = Home; W = Win; L = Loss; T = Tie

==== Match results ====
March 21, 2009 1	Houston Dynamo	1–1	Columbus Crew	Houston, Texas
7:00 PM CDT	Cameron (yellow card) 43'; Ching 53'; Barrett (yellow card) 59'	Report	Gaven (yellow card) 62'; Hejduk (yellow card) 75'; Schelotto 81'	Stadium: Robertson Stadium; Attendance: 16,053; Referee: Tim Weyland

March 28, 2009 2	San Jose Earthquakes	3–2	Houston Dynamo	Santa Clara, California
9:30 PM CDT	Johnson 30'; Alvarez 33'; Weaver 44'; Corrales (yellow card) 66'	Report	Cameron (yellow card) 23'; Wondolowski 34'; Davis 36'; Boswell (yellow card) 70'; Clark (yellow card) 90+3'	Stadium: Buck Shaw Stadium; Attendance: 9,177; Referee: Kevin Stott

April 4, 2009 3	D.C. United	1–0	Houston Dynamo	Washington, D.C.
6:30 PM CDT	Emilio 47'; Moreno (red card) 71'	Report	Barrett (yellow card) 49'; James (yellow card) 86'	Stadium: RFK Memorial Stadium; Attendance: 12,594; Referee: Baldomero Toledo

April 11, 2009 4	Houston Dynamo	0–0	New York Red Bulls	Houston, Texas
7:30 PM CDT	Ching (yellow card) 43'; Boswell (yellow card) 79'; Chabala (red card) 90+3'	Report	Pietravallo (yellow card) 13'; Boyens (yellow card) 34'; Stammler (yellow card) 54'; Petke (yellow card) 68'; Carlos (red card) 78'	Stadium: Robertson Stadium; Attendance: 19,494; Referee: Hilario Grajeda

April 19, 2009 5	Houston Dynamo	1–0	Colorado Rapids	Houston, Texas
2:00 PM CDT	Ching 20'; Clark (yellow card) 34'; Davis (yellow card) 63'	Report	Casey (yellow card) 25'; Clark (yellow card) 28'; Mastroeni (yellow card) 58'; Cummings (yellow card) 73'	Stadium: Robertson Stadium; Attendance: 12,708; Referee: Mark Geiger

May 3, 2009 6	New England Revolution	0–2	Houston Dynamo	Foxborough, Massachusetts
2:00 PM CDT	Mansally (yellow card) 51'	Report	Holden 22'; Clark (yellow card) 44'; Ching 58'; Mullan (yellow card) 63'	Stadium: Gillette Stadium; Attendance: 9,112; Referee: Terry Vaughn

May 9, 2009 7 Texas Derby	Houston Dynamo	1–0	FC Dallas	Houston, Texas
8:00 PM CDT	Kamara 58'; Davis (yellow card) 62'	Report	Wagner (yellow card) 31'; Ferreira (yellow card) 62'; Cooper (yellow card) 75'	Stadium: Robertson Stadium; Attendance: 16,932; Referee: Kevin Stott

May 16, 2009 8	New York Red Bulls	1–1	Houston Dynamo	East Rutherford, New Jersey
6:30 PM CDT	Rojas (red card) 35'; Angel (yellow card) 36'; Wolyniec 88'; Petke (yellow card) 90'	Report	Akinbiyi (yellow card) 27'; Wondolowski 78'	Stadium: Giants Stadium; Attendance: 14,647; Referee: Baldomero Toledo

May 23, 2009 9	Houston Dynamo	3–1	San Jose Earthquakes	Houston, Texas
7:30 PM CDT	Ching 4'; Kamara 12'; Waibel (yellow card) 46' (goal) 50'; Cameron (yellow card) 59'	Report	Johnson (yellow card) 14' (goal) 53'	Stadium: Robertson Stadium; Attendance: 12,619; Referee: Alex Prus

May 30, 2009 10	Houston Dynamo	3–0	Toronto FC	Houston, Texas
7:30 PM CDT	Davis 19'; Kamara 22'; Holden 24'; Hainault (yellow card) 39'	Report	Serioux (yellow card) 19'; Guevara (yellow card) 90+2'	Stadium: Robertson Stadium; Attendance: 16,037; Referee: Yader Reyes

June 5, 2009 11	Chicago Fire	0–1	Houston Dynamo	Bridgeview, Illinois
8:00 PM CDT	Mapp (yellow card) 81'; Ward (yellow card) 88'	Report	Holden 4'; Davis (yellow card) 27'; Wondolowski (yellow card) 76'	Stadium: Toyota Park; Attendance: 13,246; Referee: Ricardo Salazar

June 10, 2009 12	Houston Dynamo	1–0	Chivas USA	Houston, Texas
7:30 PM CDT	Holden 45+2'; Boswell (yellow card) 53'	Report	Talley (yellow card) 39'	Stadium: Robertson Stadium; Attendance: 14,516; Referee: Jorge Gonzalez

June 13, 2009 13 Texas Derby	FC Dallas	1–3	Houston Dynamo	Frisco, Texas
7:30 PM CDT	Rocha (yellow card) 40'; Moor 66'	Report	Weaver 12', 63'; Mulrooney 36'	Stadium: Pizza Hut Park; Attendance: 8,580; Referee: Mark Geiger

June 20, 2009 14	Houston Dynamo	1–1	Real Salt Lake	Houston, Texas
7:30 PM CDT	Mulrooney (yellow card) 44'; Ching 89'	Report	Beltran (yellow card) 17'; Espindola 28'; Olave (yellow card) 35' (yellow-red card) 58'; Morales (yellow card) 67'; Rimando (yellow card) 72'	Stadium: Robertson Stadium; Attendance: 17,151; Referee: Jair Marrufo

June 28, 2009 15	Los Angeles Galaxy	1–0	Houston Dynamo	Carson, California
9:00 PM CDT	Dunivant 24'; Buddle (yellow card) 56'; Magee (yellow card) 89'	Report	Chabala (yellow card) 54'; Boswell (yellow card) 56'; Cameron (yellow card) 81'	Stadium: Home Depot Center; Attendance: 17,938; Referee: Michael Kennedy

July 4, 2009 16	Kansas City Wizards	0–1	Houston Dynamo	Kansas City, Kansas
8:00 PM CDT		(results)	Kamara 18'; Chabala (yellow card) 45+1'; Boswell (yellow card) 49'; Cameron (yellow card) 90+4'	Stadium: CommunityAmerica Ballpark; Attendance: 10,385; Referee: Hilario Grajeda

July 11, 2009 17	Seattle Sounders FC	2–1	Houston Dynamo	Seattle, Washington
3:00 PM CDT	Montero 32'; Hurtado (yellow card) 43'; Ianni 46'; Vagenas (yellow card) 64'; Wahl (yellow card) 66'	Report	Davis 12'; Waibel (yellow card) 71'; Kamara (yellow card) 90'	Stadium: Qwest Field; Attendance: 32,404; Referee: Mark Geiger

July 18, 2009 18	Toronto FC	1–1	Houston Dynamo	Toronto, Ontario, Canada
12:00 PM CDT	Vitti (yellow card) 24'; De Rosario 37'; Garcia (yellow card) 55'	Report	Kamara (yellow card) 45+3'; Chabala (yellow card) 68'; Boswell 74'	Stadium: BMO Field; Attendance: 20,172; Referee: Kevin Stott

July 25, 2009 19	Houston Dynamo	0–1	New England Revolution	Houston, Texas
7:30 PM CDT	James (yellow card) 38'; Clark (yellow card) 78'	Report	Larentowicz (yellow card) 34'; Dube 76'	Stadium: Robertson Stadium; Attendance: 15,179; Referee: Michael Kennedy

August 1, 2009 20	Houston Dynamo	4–3	D.C. United	Houston, Texas
7:30 PM CDT	Davis 36' (yellow card) 48'; Ching 38', 39'; Holden (yellow card) 45' (goal) 66' (pen.)	Report	Olsen (yellow card) 20'; Gomez (yellow card) 45'; Emilio 48', 87'; Pontius (yellow card) 73'; Fred 74'	Stadium: Robertson Stadium; Attendance: 14,694; Referee: Ricardo Salazar

August 6, 2009 21 Texas Derby	FC Dallas	1–0	Houston Dynamo	Frisco, Texas
7:30 PM CDT	Cunningham 20'; Ricchetti (yellow card) 22'; Harris (yellow card) 36'; Sala (yellow card) 84'	Report	Boswell (yellow card) 12'; Onstad (yellow card) 12'; Kamara (yellow card) 56'; Davis (red card) 73'; James (yellow card) 85'	Stadium: Pizza Hut Park; Attendance: 7,442; Referee: Baldomero Toledo

August 9, 2009 22	Houston Dynamo	3–2	Chicago Fire	Houston, Texas
7:30 PM CDT	Kamara 21'; Clark 37'; Ching (yellow card) 56'; Holden 83' (pen.)	Report	Brown (yellow card) 35'; Prideaux (yellow card) 39'; Busch (yellow card) 45+2'; Rolfe 46' (yellow card) 62'; Lowry 48'; Blanco (yellow card) 73'	Stadium: Robertson Stadium; Attendance: 18,809; Referee: Terry Vaughn

August 15, 2009 23	Real Salt Lake	0–0	Houston Dynamo	Sandy, Utah
8:00 PM CDT	Mathis (yellow card) 4' (yellow-red card) 45+2'; Olave (yellow card) 30'; Beckerman (yellow card) 74'; Beltran (yellow card) 77'	Report	Hainault (yellow card) 8' (yellow-red card) 36'; Barrett (yellow card) 35'	Stadium: Rio Tinto Stadium; Attendance: 16,972; Referee: Paul Ward

August 23, 2009 24	Houston Dynamo	1–1	Seattle Sounders FC	Houston, Texas
7:30 PM CDT	Boswell (yellow card) 19'; Cameron 36'	Report	Levesque (yellow card) 13'; Jaqua 70'	Stadium: Robertson Stadium; Attendance: 17,063; Referee: Alex Prus

August 30, 2009 25	Colorado Rapids	1–0	Houston Dynamo	Commerce City, Colorado
2:00 PM CDT	Harvey (yellow card) 42'; Baudet 55'; Mastroeni (yellow card) 64'; Casey (yellow card) 90+q'	Report	Landín (yellow card) 72'; Davis (red card) 87'	Stadium: Dick's Sporting Goods Park; Attendance: 10,897; Referee: Hilario Grajeda

September 13, 2009 26	Columbus Crew	2–1	Houston Dynamo	Columbus, Ohio
4:00 PM CDT	Hejduk 34'; Moffat (red card) 82'; Hesmer (yellow card) 87'; Gaven 90+1' (pen.)	Report	Weaver 80'; Clark (red card) 82'; Ching (yellow card) 87'	Stadium: Columbus Crew Stadium; Attendance: 14,306; Referee: Jorge Gonzalez

September 19, 2009 27	Houston Dynamo	3–2	Real Salt Lake	Houston, Texas
7:30 PM CDT	Ching 2' (red card) 82'; Cameron 5'; Cochrane (yellow card) 45+1'; Davis 81'; Ashe (yellow card) 90+2'	Report	Borchers (yellow card) 20'; Beckerman 27'; Olave (red card) 32'; Movsisyan 60'; Findley (yellow card) 61'; Johnson (yellow card) 70'	Stadium: Robertson Stadium; Attendance: 18,133; Referee: Baldomero Toledo

October 4, 2009 28	Houston Dynamo	1–1	Kansas City Wizards	Houston, Texas
2:00 PM CDT	Hainault (yellow card) 2'; Weaver (red card) 17'; Mullan (yellow card) 18'; Landín 26'; Chabala (yellow card) 88'	Report	Leathers (yellow card) 46'; Kamara (yellow card) 49'; Hercegfalvi 73'	Stadium: Robertson Stadium; Attendance: 16,854; Referee: Jorge Gonzalez

October 18, 2009 29	Houston Dynamo	0–0	Los Angeles Galaxy	Houston, Texas
2:00 PM CDT	Ching (yellow card) 84' (yellow-red card) 84'; Oduro (yellow card) 87'	Report	Beckham (yellow card) 84'; Gordon (yellow card) 91+'	Stadium: Robertson Stadium; Attendance: 29,470; Referee: Kevin Stott

October 25, 2009 30	Chivas USA	2–3	Houston Dynamo	Carson, California
2:00 PM CDT	Santos (yellow card) 16'; Cuesta (yellow card) 56'; Lahoud 59'; Kljestan (yellow card) 71'; Lillingston 88' (pen.) (yellow card) 90+4'	Report	Hainault 26'; Oduro 29'; Thompson 52'; Cameron (yellow card) 54'; Robinson (yellow card) 77'	Stadium: Home Depot Center; Attendance: 14,523; Referee: Mark Geiger

=== MLS Cup Playoffs ===
October 29, 2009 Conf. Semifinals	Seattle Sounders FC	0–0	Houston Dynamo	Seattle, Washington
9:00 PM CDT	Montero (yellow card) 16'; Alonso (yellow card) 64'; Evans (yellow card) 68'	Report	Onstad (yellow card) 16'; Mullan (yellow card) 71'; Chabala (yellow card) 75'	Stadium: Qwest Field; Attendance: 35,807; Referee: Ricardo Salazar

November 8, 2009 Conf. Semifinals	Houston Dynamo	1–0 (a.e.t.)	Seattle Sounders FC	Houston, Texas
2:00 PM CST	Chabala (yellow card) 44'; Cameron (yellow card) 90+3'; Ching 96'	Report	Marshall (yellow card) 24'; Riley (red card) 120'; Ljungberg (yellow card) 120+3'	Stadium: Robertson Stadium; Attendance: 27,465; Referee: Jorge Gonzalez

November 13, 2009 Conf. Finals	Los Angeles Galaxy	2–0 (a.e.t.)	Houston Dynamo	Carson, California
10:00 PM CST	Kovalenko (yellow card) 77'; Donovan (yellow card) 89' (goal) 109' (pen.); Berhalter 103'	Report	Mullan (yellow card) 26'; Boswell (yellow card) 111'; Landín (yellow card) 119'	Stadium: Home Depot Center; Attendance: 25,373; Referee: Terry Vaughn

=== U.S. Open Cup ===
July 1, 2009 Third round	Austin Aztex (Texas)	0–2	(Texas) Houston Dynamo	Austin, Texas
7:30 PM CDT	Caugherty (yellow card) 37'; Callahan (yellow card) 62'	Report	Ashe 71'; Oduro 90'	Stadium: Nelson Field; Attendance: 4,002; Referee: Jeremy Vehar

July 7, 2009 Quarterfinals	Charleston Battery (North Carolina)	0–4	(Texas) Houston Dynamo	Charleston, South Carolina
6:30 PM CDT	Buete (yellow card) 1'; Treschuk (yellow card) 80'; Yoshitake (yellow card) 90+'	Report	Cameron 16' 73'; Boswell 47'; Oduro 52'; Ustruck (yellow card) 53'	Stadium: Blackbaud Stadium; Attendance: 2,473; Referee: Tony Russo

July 21, 2009 Semifinals	Seattle Sounders FC (Washington (state))	2–1 (a.e.t.)	(Texas) Houston Dynamo	Tukwila, Washington
9:30 PM CDT	Jaqua (yellow card) 62'; Hurtado (yellow card) 67' (yellow-red card) 110'; Marshall (yellow card) 80'; Jaqua 89'; King 95'	Report	James (yellow card) 30'; Boswell (yellow card) 30'; Akinbiyi 32'; Davis (yellow card) 43'; Mullan (yellow card) 70'; Chabala (yellow card) 90'	Stadium: Starfire Sports Complex; Attendance: 4,895; Referee: Edvin Jurisevic

=== 2008–09 CONCACAF Champions League ===
February 24, 2009 Quarterfinals	Houston Dynamo (United States)	1–1	(Mexico) Atlante	Houston, Texas
10:00 PM CST	Boswell 34'; Kamara (yellow card) 56'; Davis (yellow card) 63'; Mulrooney (yellow card) 68'; Cameron (yellow card) 81'	Report	Pereyra (yellow card) 9' (goal) 82'; Arreola (yellow card) 44'; Espinoza (yellow card) 83'; Venegas (yellow card) 89'	Stadium: Robertson Stadium; Attendance: 10,203; Referee: Neal Brizan (Trinidad and Tobago)

March 3, 2009 Quarterfinals	Atlante (Mexico)	3–0 (4–1 agg.)	(United States) Houston Dynamo	Cancún, Mexico
10:00 PM CST	Martínez (yellow card) 10'; Navarro 23'; Márquez 36'; Vilar (yellow card) 57'; OValle (yellow card) 70'; Maldonado 90'	Report	Mulrooney (yellow card) 33'; Kamara (yellow card) 34'; James (yellow card) 54'	Stadium: Estadio Andrés Quintana Roo; Attendance: 10,000; Referee: Silviu Petrescu (Canada)

=== 2009–10 CONCACAF Champions League ===
Team	Pld	W	D	L	GF	GA	GD	Pts
(Mexico) Pachuca	6	5	0	1	15	4	+11	15
(Panama) Árabe Unido	6	3	1	2	13	9	+4	10
(United States) Houston Dynamo	6	2	1	3	9	8	+1	7
(El Salvador) Isidro Metapán	6	1	0	5	3	19	−16	3

	ARA	HOU	MET	PAC
Árabe Unido	–	1–1	6–0	4–1
Houston Dynamo	5–1	–	1–0	0–1
Isidro Metapán	0–1	3–2	–	0–4
Pachuca	2–0	2–0	5–0	–

August 19, 2009 Group stage	Houston Dynamo (United States)	1–0	(El Salvador) Isidro Metapán	Houston, Texas
7:00 PM CDT	Waibel (yellow card) 9'; Ashe (yellow card) 39'; Ching 68'	Report	Alvarado (yellow card) 26'; Aguilar (yellow card) 39'; Jiménez (yellow card) 66'; Alfaro (yellow card) 68'; Aquino (yellow card) 68'	Stadium: Robertson Stadium; Attendance: 7,997; Referee: Mauricio Morales (Mexico)

August 26, 2009 Group stage	Árabe Unido (Panama)	1–1	(United States) Houston Dynamo	Panama City, Panama
9:00 PM CDT	Camargo (yellow card) 10' (yellow-red card) 67'; Daniels (red card) 11'; Castañeda (yellow card) 42'; Santamaria (yellow card) 62'; Mosquera (yellow card) 74'; Rodríguez 90+1'	Report	Cruz (yellow card) 4'; Hainault (yellow card) 35' (yellow-red card) 81'; Ashe (red card) 55'; Kamara 69'; Boswell (yellow card) 82'; Holden (yellow card) 86' (yellow-red card) 86'	Stadium: Estadio Agustín Sánchez; Attendance: 1,300; Referee: Neal Brizan (Trinidad and Tobago)

September 16, 2009 Group stage	Pachuca (Mexico)	2–0	(United States) Houston Dynamo	Pachuca, Mexico
9:00 PM CDT	Benitez 25'; Aguilar 74'	Report	Oduro (yellow card) 24' (yellow-red card) 45+1'; Cameron (yellow card) 50'; Weaver (yellow card) 56'	Stadium: Estadio Hidalgo; Attendance: 18,000; Referee: Elmer Bonilla (El Salvador)

September 22, 2009 Group stage	Houston Dynamo (United States)	5–1	(Panama) Árabe Unido	Houston, Texas
9:00 PM CDT	Robinson 12'; Weaver 49'; Holden (yellow card) 57' (goal) 74', 90+2'; Mullan (yellow card) 64'; Ashe 69'	Report	Camargo (yellow card) 18' (yellow-red card) 56'; Velez (yellow card) 26'; Santamaria (yellow card) 51'; Aguirre (yellow card) 62'; Rodriguez 69'	Stadium: Robertson Stadium; Attendance: 6,938; Referee: Paul Delgadillo (Mexico)

September 30, 2009 Group stage	Houston Dynamo (United States)	0–1	(Mexico) Pachuca	Houston, Texas
9:00 PM CDT	Mullan (yellow card) 90+4'	Report	Benitez 23' (yellow card) 49'; Calero (yellow card) 38'; Lopez (yellow card) 55'; Correa (yellow card) 88'	Stadium: Robertson Stadium; Attendance: 10,130; Referee: Roberto Moreno (Panama)

October 21, 2009 Group stage	Isidro Metapán (El Salvador)	3–2	(United States) Houston Dynamo	Metapán, El Salvador
9:00 PM CDT	Montes 7'; Canales 8'; Umaña 56'	Report	Cameron 28' (yellow card) 84'; Hall 45+1'; Davis (yellow card) 56'; Cochrane (yellow card) 79'; Waibel (yellow card) 90+2'	Stadium: Estadio Jorge Calero Suárez; Attendance: 1,200; Referee: José Pineda (Honduras)

== Player statistics ==
=== Appearances, goals, and assists ===
No.	Pos.	Nat.	Player	Total			MLS			Playoffs			U.S. Open Cup			2008–09 Champions League			2009–10 Champions League		
No.	Pos.	Nat.	Player	Apps	G	A	Apps	G	A	Apps	G	A	Apps	G	A	Apps	G	A	Apps	G	A
1	GK	(United States)	Tally Hall	7	1	0	0	0	0	0	0	0	3	0	0	0	0	0	4	1	0
2	DF	(United States)	Eddie Robinson	5	1	0	1	0	0	1	0	0	0	0	0	0	0	0	3	1	0
3	DF	(Trinidad and Tobago)	Julius James (Note: Left during the season)	13	0	0	8	0	0	0	0	0	3	0	0	2	0	0	0	0	0
4	DF	(United States)	Ryan Cochrane	9	0	2	6	0	2	0	0	0	0	0	0	0	0	0	3	0	0
5	MF	(United States)	Danny Cruz	11	0	0	6	0	0	0	0	0	3	0	0	0	0	0	2	0	0
6	MF	(United States)	Erik Ustruck	8	0	0	2	0	0	0	0	0	3	0	0	0	0	0	3	0	0
7	FW	(Mexico)	Luis Ángel Landín	10	1	0	7	1	0	3	0	0	0	0	0	0	0	0	0	0	0
7	FW	(United States)	Chris Wondolowski	8	2	1	7	2	1	0	0	0	0	0	0	1	0	0	0	0	0
8	MF	(United States)	Richard Mulrooney	17	1	1	14	1	1	0	0	0	1	0	0	2	0	0	0	0	0
9	MF	(United States)	Brian Mullan	38	0	6	25	0	4	3	0	0	3	0	1	2	0	0	5	0	1
10	FW	(United States)	Abe Thompson	3	1	1	1	1	0	0	0	0	0	0	0	0	0	0	2	0	1
10	FW	(Sierra Leone)	Kei Kamara	28	6	1	22	5	1	0	0	0	3	0	0	2	0	0	1	1	0
11	MF	(United States)	Brad Davis	39	5	13	27	5	12	3	0	0	2	0	0	2	0	1	5	0	0
13	MF	(United States)	Ricardo Clark	29	1	1	22	1	1	3	0	0	0	0	0	2	0	0	2	0	0
14	FW	(Nigeria)	Ade Akinbiyi	18	1	0	14	0	0	0	0	0	3	1	0	0	0	0	1	0	0
15	FW	(United States)	Cam Weaver	13	4	1	8	3	1	2	0	0	0	0	0	0	0	0	3	1	0
16	DF	(United States)	Craig Waibel	18	1	0	13	1	0	0	0	0	0	0	0	1	0	0	4	0	0
17	MF	(United States)	Mike Chabala	24	0	3	15	0	3	2	0	0	3	0	0	0	0	0	4	0	0
18	GK	(Canada)	Pat Onstad	37	0	0	30	0	0	3	0	0	0	0	0	2	0	0	2	0	0
19	MF	(United States)	John Michael Hayden	6	0	2	0	0	0	0	0	0	3	0	2	0	0	0	3	0	0
20	MF	(United States)	Geoff Cameron	41	5	6	29	2	6	3	0	0	2	2	0	2	0	0	5	1	0
22	MF	(United States)	Stuart Holden	36	8	5	26	6	4	3	0	0	0	0	0	2	0	0	5	2	1
23	FW	(Ghana)	Dominic Oduro	27	3	4	16	1	4	3	0	0	3	2	0	0	0	0	5	0	0
24	DF	(United States)	Wade Barrett	19	0	0	12	0	0	1	0	0	0	0	0	2	0	0	4	0	0
25	FW	(United States)	Brian Ching	29	10	4	19	8	3	3	1	0	0	0	0	2	0	0	5	1	1
26	MF	(United States)	Corey Ashe	37	2	5	27	0	3	2	0	0	3	1	1	1	0	0	4	1	1
30	GK	(United States)	Tyler Deric	0	0	0	0	0	0	0	0	0	0	0	0	0	0	0	0	0	0
31	DF	(Canada)	André Hainault	28	1	2	20	1	2	3	0	0	1	0	0	0	0	0	4	0	0
32	DF	(United States)	Bobby Boswell	41	3	0	29	1	0	3	0	0	3	1	0	1	1	0	5	0	0

Source: Season Statistics and match reports in Competitions

=== Disciplinary record ===
No.	Pos.	Nat.	Player	Total		MLS		Playoffs		U.S. Open Cup		2008–09 Champions League		2009–10 Champions League	
No.	Pos.	Nat.	Player	Booked	Sent off (straight red)	Booked	Sent off (straight red)	Booked	Sent off (straight red)	Booked	Sent off (straight red)	Booked	Sent off (straight red)	Booked	Sent off (straight red)
2	DF	(United States)	Eddie Robinson	1	0	1	0	0	0	0	0	0	0	0	0
3	DF	(Trinidad and Tobago)	Julius James (Note: Left during the season)	5	0	3	0	0	0	1	0	1	0	0	0
4	DF	(United States)	Ryan Cochrane	2	0	1	0	0	0	0	0	0	0	1	0
5	MF	(United States)	Danny Cruz	1	0	0	0	0	0	0	0	0	0	1	0
6	MF	(United States)	Erik Ustruck	1	0	0	0	0	0	1	0	0	0	0	0
7	FW	(Mexico)	Luis Ángel Landín	2	0	1	0	1	0	0	0	0	0	0	0
7	FW	(United States)	Chris Wondolowski	1	0	1	0	0	0	0	0	0	0	0	0
8	MF	(United States)	Richard Mulrooney	3	0	1	0	0	0	0	0	2	0	0	0
9	MF	(United States)	Brian Mullan	7	0	2	0	2	0	1	0	0	0	2	0
10	FW	(Sierra Leone)	Kei Kamara	5	0	3	0	0	0	0	0	2	0	0	0
11	MF	(United States)	Brad Davis	7	2	4	2	0	0	1	0	1	0	1	0
13	MF	(United States)	Ricardo Clark	4	1	4	1	0	0	0	0	0	0	0	0
14	FW	(Nigeria)	Ade Akinbiyi	1	0	1	0	0	0	0	0	0	0	0	0
15	FW	(United States)	Cam Weaver	1	1	0	1	0	0	0	0	0	0	1	0
16	DF	(United States)	Craig Waibel	4	0	2	0	0	0	0	0	0	0	2	0
17	MF	(United States)	Mike Chabala	7	1	4	1	2	0	1	0	0	0	0	0
18	GK	(Canada)	Pat Onstad	2	0	1	0	1	0	0	0	0	0	0	0
20	MF	(United States)	Geoff Cameron	10	0	6	0	1	0	0	0	1	0	2	0
22	MF	(United States)	Stuart Holden	4	0	1	0	0	0	0	0	0	0	3	0
23	FW	(Ghana)	Dominic Oduro	3	0	1	0	0	0	0	0	0	0	2	0
24	DF	(United States)	Wade Barrett	3	0	3	0	0	0	0	0	0	0	0	0
25	FW	(United States)	Brian Ching	4	2	4	2	0	0	0	0	0	0	0	0
26	MF	(United States)	Corey Ashe	2	1	1	0	0	0	0	0	0	0	1	1
31	DF	(Canada)	André Hainault	5	1	3	1	0	0	0	0	0	0	2	0
32	DF	(United States)	Bobby Boswell	10	0	7	0	1	0	1	0	0	0	1	0

Source: and match reports in Competitions

=== Clean sheets ===
Rank	Nat.	Player	MLS	Playoffs	U.S. Open Cup	2008–09 Champions League	2009–10 Champions League	Total
1	(Canada)	Pat Onstad	10	2	0	0	1	13
2	(United States)	Tally Hall	0	0	2	0	0	2
Total			10	2	2	0	1	15

Source: Season Statistics and match reports in Competitions

== Honors and awards ==
=== MLS Player of the Week ===
Week	Player	Ref.
27	(United States) Brad Davis	

=== MLS Goal of the Week ===
Week	Player	Opponent	Date
5	(United States) Brian Ching	Colorado Rapids	April 19
27	(United States) Brad Davis	Real Salt Lake	September 19

=== MLS Save of the Week ===
Week	Player	Opponent	Date
12	(Canada) Pat Onstad	Chicago Fire	June 10
17	(Canada) Pat Onstad	Seattle Sounders FC	July 11
23	(Canada) Pat Onstad and (United States) Wade Barrett	Seattle Sounders FC	August 23
31	(United States) Geoff Cameron	Los Angeles Galaxy	October 18

=== Annual ===
Honor	Player	Ref.
MLS All-Star	(United States) Brad Davis (United States) Brian Ching (United States) Geoff Cameron (Canada) Pat Onstad (United States) Stuart Holden	
MLS Best XI	(United States) Geoff Cameron (United States) Stuart Holden	
MLS Save of the Year	(Canada) Pat Onstad	

=== Dynamo team awards ===
MVP	Defensive Player of the Year	Humanitarian of the Year	Young Player of the Year	Newcomer of the Year	Ref.
(United States) Brad Davis	(United States) Geoff Cameron	(United States) Stuart Holden	(Canada) André Hainault	(United States) Cam Weaver	

== Kits ==
Supplier: Adidas / Sponsor: Amigo Energy

Home	Away
