= Corey Ashe =

American soccer player

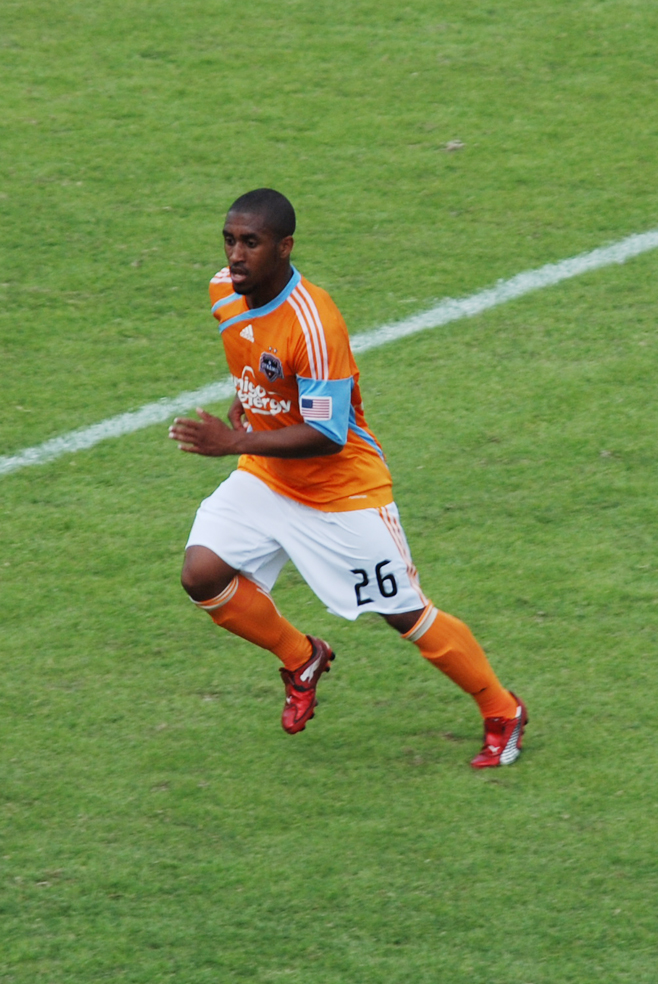
- Ashe with Houston Dynamo in 2010

Personal information
- Full name: Corey Alan Ashe
- Date of birth: March 14, 1986 (age 40)
- Place of birth: Orange County, California, U.S.
- Height: 5 ft 5 in (1.65 m)
- Positions: Left back; left winger

Youth career
- –2001: Beach FC - Impact
- 2001–2003: IMG Soccer Academy

College career
Years	Team	Apps	(Gls)
2003–2006	North Carolina Tar Heels	77	(22)

Senior career*
Years	Team	Apps	(Gls)
2006	Virginia Beach Submariners	13	(3)
2007–2015	Houston Dynamo	211	(1)
2015	Orlando City SC	9	(0)
2016	Columbus Crew	18	(0)
Total		251	(4)

International career
2003	United States U17	4	(0)
2008	United States U23	3	(0)
- * Club domestic league appearances and goals as of October 29, 2016

Corey Alan Ashe (born March 14, 1986) is an American former professional soccer player. He played 10 seasons in Major League Soccer, mostly with the Houston Dynamo, but also with Orlando City SC and Columbus Crew SC. Originally a wide midfielder, Ashe moved to left back in 2011 and established himself as one of the best left backs in MLS, being named an MLS All-Star in 2011 and 2013. Ashe was considered one of the fastest players in MLS during his time in the league. While in Houston, he was part of the MLS Cup 2007 winning squad and helped the Dynamo reach two more finals in 2011 and 2012. His 266 career appearances for the Dynamo is the 3rd most in franchise history.

== Career ==
=== Youth career and college ===
Born in Orange County, California, Ashe played with Beach FC - Impact before moving to Bradenton, Florida to join U.S. Soccer's residency program at IMG Academy in 2001.

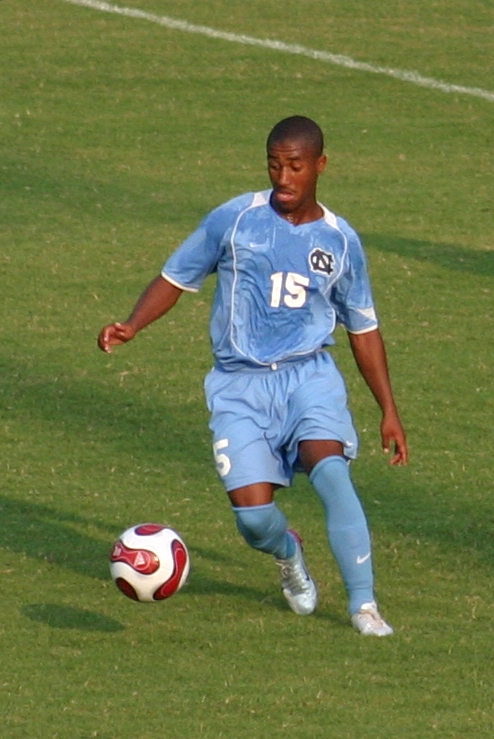
Ashe playing for North Carolina in 2006

Ashe attended the University of North Carolina in 2003 and played four years for the Tar Heels, starting regularly his last three years. He scored 22 goals in four years, including nine as a sophomore. In 2003, Ashe was named to the Atlantic Coast Conference All-Freshman Team. For the 2004 season, he was named to the All-ACC second team.

During the summer in 2006, he also played for the Virginia Beach Submariners in the USL Premier Development League.

=== Houston Dynamo ===
2007 season

Ashe was drafted by the Houston Dynamo in the second round of the 2007 MLS SuperDraft, with the 26th overall pick. After a good preseason camp, Ashe signed a contract with Houston in February. On May 19, he made his Dynamo debut, coming on as a substitute in a 1–0 loss to the New England Revolution. On June 3, Ashe picked up his first assist as a pro on Joseph Ngwenya's goal in a 2–1 over Texas Derby rivals FC Dallas. He made his first career start on July 10, having appeared in the previous 10 games as a sub, as the Dynamo lost to the Charleston Battery 1–0 in the U.S. Open Cup. During the game Ashe suffered an ankle injury that kept him out of the next 2 games. He would return to the field on July 22 in a 3 all draw with New England. On July 29, Ashe made his continental debut, coming off the bench in a 1–1 draw with Monarcas Morelia in a North American SuperLiga match.. He would get the start in Houston's next SuperLiga game, helping the Dynamo to 1–0 win over D.C. United that saw Houston top the group. In the semifinal matchup with C.F. Pachuca, Ashe was shown his first career in the 102nd minute. The Dynamo would go on to lose 4–3 on penalties. On August 25 he made his first career MLS start, playing the full 90 minutes in a 1–1 draw with the Columbus Crew. On September 8, Ashe picked up 3 assists, all to Nate Jaqua, as Houston defeated Real Salt Lake 4–3. Ashe ended his rookie season making 22 appearances in MLS play, with 6 of them being starts, helping the Dynamo finish 2nd in the Western Conference. They would go on to defeat the Revolution in MLS Cup 2007, their second straight championship. However Ashe did not make any appearances during the playoff run.

2008 season

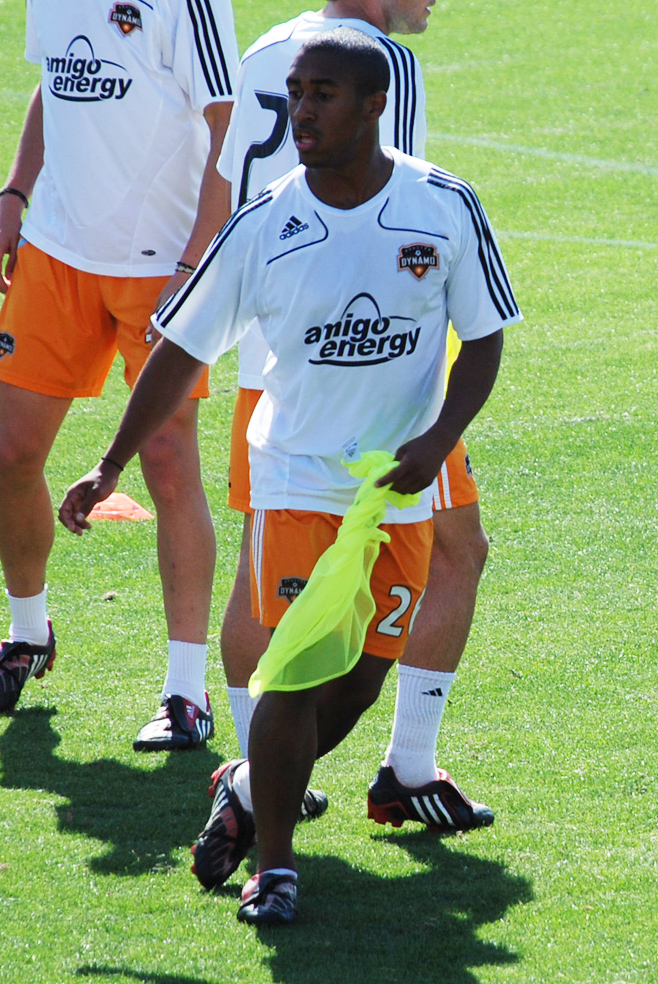
Ashe warming up before a game in 2008

On March 12, 2008, Ashe and the Dynamo began the 2008 season with a 0–0 draw vs C.S.D. Municipal in the 2008 CONCACAF Champions' Cup. Houston won the return leg 3–1, with Ashe picking up an assist. Although they lost to Saprissa in the semifinals, Ashe played every minute of the 4 matches. Ashe and the Dynamo opened the MLS season on March 29 with a 3–0 loss to the New England Revolution. On April 6, Ashe assisted Franco Caraccio in a 3–3 draw with FC Dallas. After missing a game on May 17 due to being involved in the 2008 Toulon Tournament with the U.S. under-23 national team, Ashe returned to the Dynamo on May 28 and scored his first goal for Houston in a 2–2 draw with FC Dallas. On July 1, Ashe played 120 minutes as Houston lost for the second straight season to the Charleston Battery in the Open Cup, this time on penalties. During the 2008 SuperLiga, Ashe made 2 starts and one appearance off the bench as he helped the Dynamo top their group. Matching up with Pachuca in the semifinals, Ashe appeared as a substitute and scored in the 87th minute to secure a 2–0 win for Houston. Facing off with New England in the final, the Dynamo lost on penalties 6–5, with Ashe hitting the crossbar with Houston's final penalty. During the group stage of the 2008–09 CONCACAF Champions League, Ashe played every minute of the 6 games and recorded 2 assists, helping Houston finish second in the group. Ashe made 22 appearances in the MLS regular season to help the Dynamo finish as the top seed in the Western Conference. In the playoffs, Houston faced off with the New York Red Bulls in the conference semifinals. Down 2–0 at halftime of leg 2, Dynamo coach Dominic Kinnear subbed off team captain Wade Barrett and put in Ashe at left back, hoping the faster Ashe could better handle speedy Red Bulls winger Dane Richards. New York won the game 3–0 and advanced 4–1 on aggregate.

2009 season

Ahead of the 2009 season, Ashe underwent a minor surgery on his toe. He made his season debut on March 3, coming on as a substitute in a 3–0 loss to Atlante F.C. in leg 2 of the 2008–09 Champions League quarterfinals, with Atlante advancing with a 4–1 aggregate score. He recorded his first assist of the season on May 16, setting up Chris Wondolowski in a 1–1 draw with the New York Red Bulls. He picked up another assist on June 13 in a 3–1 over FC Dallas. On July 1, Ashe came off the bench and scored one goal and assisted another to give Houston a 2–0 win over the Austin Aztex in an Open Cup match. He started the next 2 games in the Open Cup, helping the Dynamo reach the semifinals, where they lost to Seattle Sounders FC 2–1. On August 26, Ashe picked up a red card against C.D. Árabe Unido during the group stage for the 2009–10 CONCACAF Champions League. On September 22 Ashe scored once and assisted on Cam Weaver's goal to give Houston a 5–1 over Árabe Unido. He appeared in 4 of the 6 group stage games, but the Dynamo finished 3rd in their group. During the MLS regular season Ashe made 29 appearances, 13 of them being starts, and added 3 assists, helping Houston finish 2nd in the Western Conference. In the playoffs, Ashe came on as a sub in leg 2 of the conference semifinals, helping Houston to a 1–0 win over Seattle. He made another appearance off the bench in the conference final vs the Los Angeles Galaxy, with the Dynamo losing 2–0 in extra time.

2010 season

After appearing off the bench for the first 3 games of 2010, Ashe made his first start of the season on April 17. Ashe set up Geoff Cameron in the 12th minute as Houston defeated Chivas USA 3–1. On July 15, Ashe assisted Joseph Ngwenya in the 85th minute to give Houston a 2–1 win over C.F. Pachuca in the opening game of the SuperLiga group stage. He appeared in all 4 of the Dynamo's games during the tournament as Houston reached the semifinals, where they lost to Monarcas Morelia. During the MLS regular season, Ashe appeared in 27 games, with 19 of them being starts, and recording 3 assists. It was a disappointing year for the team as a whole, finishing 7th in the Western Conference and missing out on the playoffs.

2011 season

On December 14, 2010, Ashe signed a new contract with the Dynamo. After starting the first 2 games of the season at right midfielder, head coach Dominic Kinnear decided to start Ashe at left back for the third game to better handle New York Red Bulls winger Dane Richards's pace. Despite Richards scoring in the game, 1–1 draw, Ashe did good enough for Kinnear to move him to starting left back full-time. During the first 4 seasons of his career, Ashe had struggled to find a consistent spot in the starting lineup, with All-Star Brad Davis getting the majority of starts at Ashe's preferred position of left midfielder. He took advantage of the opportunity and made the left back spot his own, starting 28 games at left back during the regular season. Ashe's strong performances earned him a spot in the 2011 MLS All-Star game, where the MLS All-Stars took on Manchester United. During the regular season he made a career high 32 regular season appearances, with 30 of them being starts. The majority of both were at left back. Ashe helped Houston return to the playoffs in 2011, finishing 2nd in the Eastern Conference. Houston faced off with the Philadelphia Union in the conference semifinals, with Ashe playing every minute as Houston won 3–1 on aggregate. In the conference final, Ashe once again started at left back as Houston faced off with Sporting Kansas City. However, left midfielder Brad Davis went down with an early injury, forcing Ashe to move up as Jermaine Taylor came in to play left back. Houston defeated Kansas City to advance to MLS Cup 2011. With Davis unavailable, Ashe got the start in midfield. In a close game, the Dynamo ultimately fell short, losing 1–0 to the LA Galaxy.

2012 season

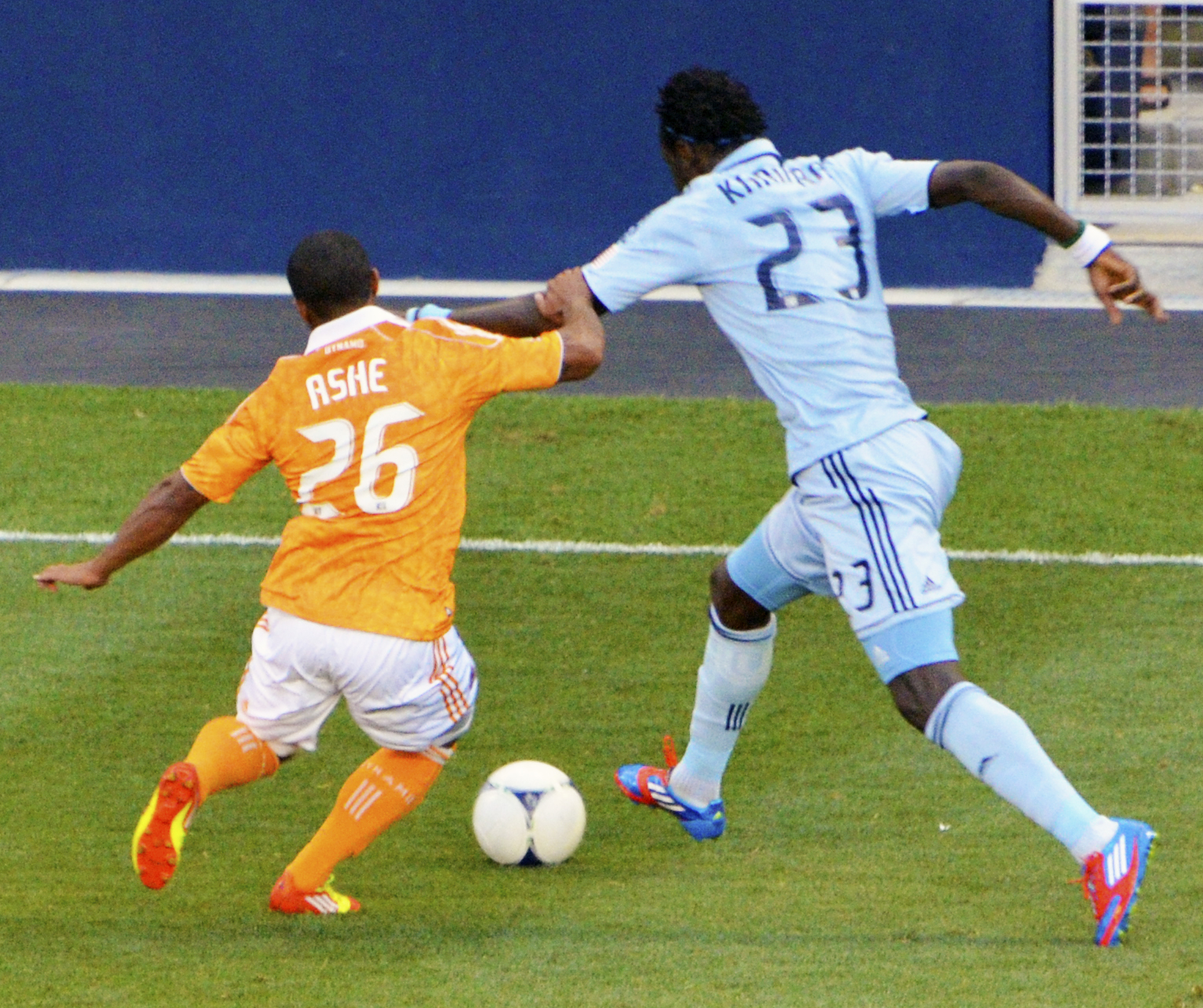
Ashe defending Kei Kamara of Sporting Kansas City during a game in 2012

Ashe and the Dynamo opened the 2012 season March 11 with a 1–0 win over Chivas USA, with Ashe getting the start at left back. He missed Houston's next game due to a hamstring injury, but he returned the following week and started in a 2–0 loss to Seattle Sounders FC. When Brad Davis had a calf injury in April, Ashe filled in at left midfielder 3 games, including on April 28 when Ashe recorded his first assist of the season in a 3–2 loss to D.C. United. On October 6 he picked up his second assist of the season in a 1–1 draw with the Montreal Impact. Ashe made 30 starts during the regular season, with 27 of them coming at left back, as he helped Houston qualify for the playoffs. He only appeared once during the 2012–13 CONCACAF Champions League group stage, starting at left back in a 1–1 draw with C.D. Olimpia to secure Houston's spot in the quarterfinals. During the playoffs, Ashe played every minute as he helped the Dynamo return to MLS Cup for the second straight year. However they experienced the same result as the previous year, losing to the LA Galaxy 3–1.

2013 season

Prior to the 2013 season, Ashe underwent a minor knee surgery. On March 2, 2013, Houston opened the season with a 2–0 win over D.C. United, with Ashe getting the start at left back. On March 5, Ashe set up Brad Davis in the 89th minute to give the Dynamo a 1–0 win over Santos Laguna in leg 1 of the 2012–13 CONCACAF Champions League quarterfinals. He did not play in leg 2, which saw Santos beat Houston 3–0 to advance. Ashe started the first 17 MLS games before missing 2 while away with the U.S. National Team for the 2013 Gold Cup. On July 15, Ashe was named to the 2013 MLS All-Star game. Ashe recorded his first assist in league play of the year on July 27 in a 1–0 draw with the Chicago Fire. On July 31, Ashe got to start the MLS All-Star game, a 3–1 loss to A.S. Roma. On August 27 he assisted on one of Cam Weaver's 2 goals in a 2–1 win over C.D. Árabe Unido in the 2013–14 Champions League group stage. Houston would finish 2nd in their group, failing to advance, with Ashe only making the one appearance. On September 1 Ashe set up Adam Moffat in the 90th minute with a backheel pass to give the Dynamo a 1–1 draw with Chicago. During the regular season Ashe made 30 appearances, including 29 starts, and recorded 2 assists as he helped Houston qualify for the playoffs. In the opening round of the playoffs, Ashe had one assist as Houston defeated the Montreal Impact 3–0. In the conference semifinals, Houston drew 2–2 with the New York Red Bulls in leg 1 before defeating them 2–1 in extra time in leg 2, with Ashe playing every minute of each leg. The opening leg of the conference finals with Sporting Kansas City was a scoreless draw, but Ashe missed it due to yellow card accumulation. He returned to the starting lineup for leg 2, however SKC defeated the Dynamo by a score of 2–1.

2014 season

Houston opened the 2014 season on March 8, with Ashe picking up an assist in a 4–0 win over the New England Revolution. Ashe started the next 14 games for the Dynamo, recording 2 assists during that stretch. He suffered a knee injury in June that limited his involvement for the next few weeks. On July 23, the Dynamo signed DaMarcus Beasley, the starting left back for the United States at the 2014 World Cup earlier that summer. The arrival of Beasley saw Ashe's first team opportunities diminish, with him only playing 4 times in the remaining 14 games of the season. The season was frustrating for Houston as a whole, missing out on the playoffs by 10 points.

2015 season

In 2015, Ashe struggled to get playing time with Houston. He only made 2 appearances during the Dynamo's first 21 games, both coming in the Open Cup. On July 14, Ashe was traded to Orlando City for a second round pick in the 2017 MLS SuperDraft and general allocation money. At the time of the trade, Ashe's 266 appearances for Houston were the second most all time in Dynamo history.

=== Orlando City ===
Ashe was acquired by Orlando City SC on July 14, 2015, in exchange for allocation money and a second round pick in the 2017 MLS SuperDraft. He made his Orlando City debut on July 18, getting the start in a 2–0 loss to the New York Red Bulls. On August 1, Ashe had 2 assists as the Lions defeated the Columbus Crew 5–2. He recorded another assist on October 16, helping Orlando City defeat New York City FC 2–1.

On November 25, Orlando City declined Ashe's contract option for the 2016 season, making him a free agent.

=== Columbus Crew SC ===
Ashe signed with Columbus Crew SC as a free agent on December 18, 2015. After being on the bench during the first 3 games of the season, Ashe missed the next 5 due to a thigh strain. He made his Crew debut on May 7, picking up an assist in a 4–4 draw with the Montreal Impact. On May 28, Ashe recorded his second assist of the season in a 4–3 win over Real Salt Lake. He missed 3 games in August due to a knee injury. On October 13, Ashe set up Adam Jahn in the 80th minute to give Columbus a 2–2 draw with New York City FC.

On November 23, Columbus declined Ashe's contract option for the 2017 season.

Ashe retired from professional soccer ahead of the 2017 season.

== International ==
Ashe was a standout in the United States' under-17 national team as co-captain of the team from 2001 to 2003. He also played at the 2003 FIFA U-17 World Championship. He also competed in the 2008 Toulon Tournament, playing in every game. Ashe was called up to the United States national team squad for friendlies against Belgium and Germany in May and June 2013, but was forced to withdraw due to injury. He was selected as a member of the 23-man United States squad for the 2013 CONCACAF Gold Cup, which the United States won. Ashe did not make any appearances.

== Career statistics ==
Club	Season	League			Playoffs		Open Cup		CONCACAF		Total	
Club	Season	Division	Apps	Goals	Apps	Goals	Apps	Goals	Apps	Goals	Apps	Goals
Virginia Beach Submariners	2006	PDL	13	3	0	0	0	0	—		13	3
Houston Dynamo	2007	MLS	22	0	0	0	1	0	3 (Note: Appearances in North American SuperLiga)	0	26	0
Houston Dynamo	2008	MLS	22	1	1	0	1	0	15 (Note: 4 appearances in 2008 CONCACAF Champions' Cup, 5 appearances and 1 goal in 2008 North American SuperLiga, 6 appearances in 2008–09 CONCACAF Champions League)	1	39	2
Houston Dynamo	2009	MLS	27	0	2	0	3	1	5 (Note: 1 appearance in 2008–09 CONCACAF Champions League, 4 appearances and 1 goal in 2009–10 CONCACAF Champions League)	1	37	2
Houston Dynamo	2010	MLS	27	0	—		0	0	4	0	31	0
Houston Dynamo	2011	MLS	32	0	4	0	1	0	—		37	0
Houston Dynamo	2012	MLS	30	0	6	0	0	0	1 (Note: Appearance in 2012–13 CONCACAF Champions League)	0	37	0
Houston Dynamo	2013	MLS	30	0	4	0	0	0	2 (Note: 1 appearance in 2012–13 CONCACAF Champions League, 1 appearance in 2013–14 CONCACAF Champions League)	0	36	0
Houston Dynamo	2014	MLS	21	0	—		0	0	—		21	0
Houston Dynamo	2015	MLS	0	0	—		2	0	—		2	0
Houston Dynamo	Dynamo Total		211	1	17	0	8	1	30	2	266	4
Orlando City SC	2015	MLS	9	0	—		0	0	—		9	0
Columbus Crew	2016	MLS	18	0	—		1	0	—		19	0
Career total			251	4	17	0	9	1	30	2	307	7

== Honors ==
=== Houston Dynamo ===
- Major League Soccer MLS Cup (1): 2007
- Major League Soccer Western Conference Championship (1): 2007
- Major League Soccer Eastern Conference Championship (2): 2011, 2012

=== Individual ===
- Major League Soccer All Star (2): 2011, 2013

=== United States ===
- CONCACAF Gold Cup (1): 2013

== Personal life ==
Ashe was born and raised in Orange County, California. His father, Al, is a retired U.S. Marine Sergeant who served in the Marine Corp for 22 years. Corey's brother, Dre, served in the U.S. Army. Ashe and his wife Jennifer live in Houston with their daughter. Early in his career, Ashe worked part-time as a youth soccer coach to supplement his low salary. Ashe is close friends with former Dynamo teammate Geoff Cameron, who shared an apartment with Ashe for multiple years early in their careers. Following Hurricane Harvey, Ashe volunteered at the Houston Food Bank and played in a charity soccer match featuring former Dynamo and Cruz Azul players. Ashe is a Christian.
