= Franco Caraccio =

Argentine football striker

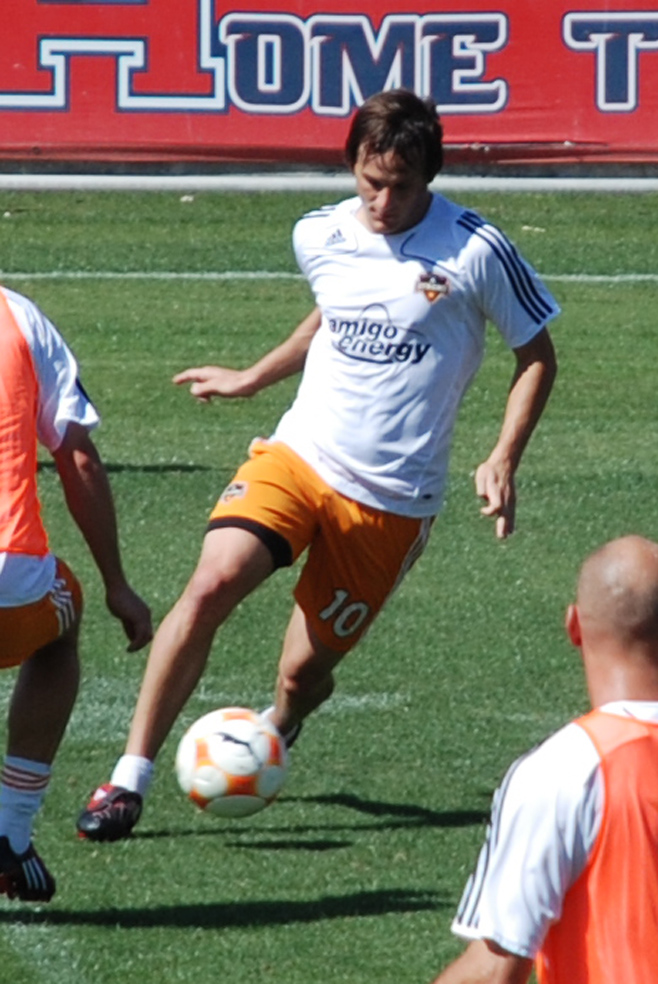

Personal information
- Full name: Franco Caraccio
- Date of birth: January 16, 1987 (age 39)
- Place of birth: Chacabuco, Buenos Aires, Argentina
- Height: 1.80 m (5 ft 11 in)
- Position: Forward

Team information
- Current team: Out of Scope FC

Senior career*
Years	Team	Apps	(Gls)
2005–2007	Arsenal de Sarandí	6	(0)
2008	Houston Dynamo	10	(2)
2008	All Boys	1	(0)
2009–2010	U.S. Foggia		
2011	C.A.I.	5	(0)
2011–2014	Vibonese		
2014–2015	Sorrento		
2015	Potenza		
2024	Out of Scope FC		
- * Club domestic league appearances and goals as of 26 March 2015

Franco Caraccio (born 16 January 1987 in Chacabuco, Argentina) is an Argentine football striker, who currently plays for Out of Scope FC.

== Professional career ==
Caraccio began his career in the youth ranks of Argentina club Arsenal de Sarandí and played five games for the club's first team during the Clausura tournament in 2006. He also played one league game during the 2006 Apertura tournament and one game in the Copa Sudamericana in 2007.

On February 28, 2008, Caraccio signed with the Houston Dynamo of Major League Soccer. He played his first games for the Dynamo in the 2008 CONCACAF Champions' Cup and made his MLS debut in Houston's first match of the 2008 MLS season against the New England Revolution on March 29, 2008. On April 6, 2008, Caraccio scored his first Dynamo goal on a header after a cross by left midfielder Corey Ashe.

He was waived by the Houston Dynamo on July 18, 2008. After an unsuccessful trial with New York Red Bulls he signed with the Primera B Nacional team Club Atlético All Boys.

On October 14, 2009, Franco was signed by U.S. Foggia on the advice of the sporting director.

He scored his first goal for Foggia with a game-winner in a match against Delfino Pescara on May 23, 2010. He had appeared in a few fleeting appearances with the club, but his performance was crucial in this play-off victory being the last game of the season, giving the team an unexpected salvation. The joy, however, ended after the final whistle, when coming in the locker room, he received the bad news of the death of his father.

In January 2011, Caraccio signed with the C.A.I., where he would make five appearances in the Primera B Nacional in Argentina.

== International career ==
Caraccio trained with the Argentine U-20 national team that worked with the Argentina national team prior to the 2006 FIFA World Cup.

== Titles ==
Season	Team	Title
2007	Arsenal de Sarandí	Copa Sudamericana

== See also ==
- List of foreign MLS players
