= Craig Thompson (soccer) =

American soccer player

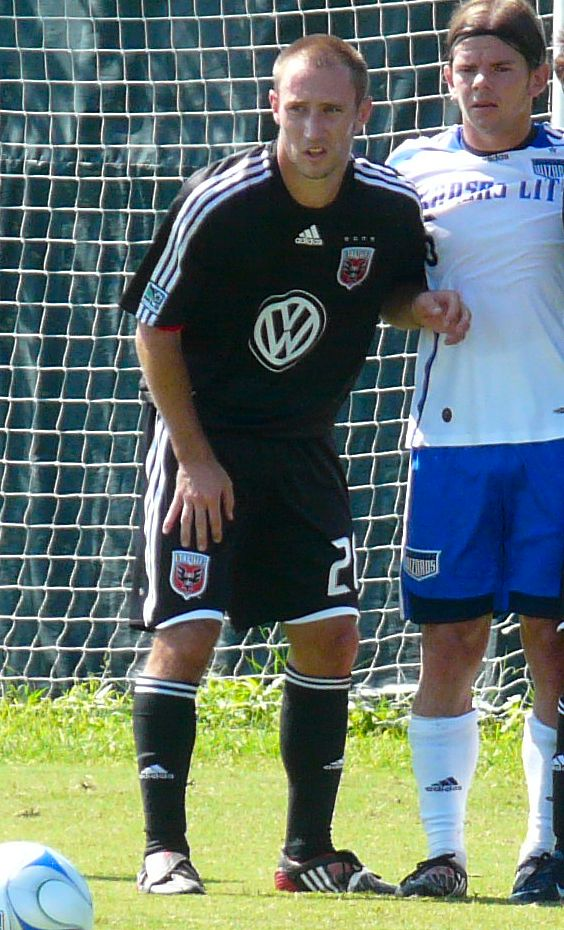

Personal information
- Full name: Craig Thompson
- Date of birth: January 24, 1986 (age 40)
- Place of birth: Littleton, Colorado, United States
- Height: 5 ft 8 in (1.73 m)
- Position: Midfielder

Team information
- Current team: Real Colorado Foxes
- Number: 4

Youth career
- 2005–2007: CSM Orediggers

Senior career*
| Years | Team | Apps | (Gls) |
| 2008 | Houston Dynamo | 0 | (0) |
| 2008 | D.C. United | 6 | (0) |
| 2009– | Real Colorado Foxes | 18 | (7) |
- * Club domestic league appearances and goals as of June 5, 2011

Craig Thompson (born January 24, 1986, in Littleton, Colorado) is an American soccer player who formerly plays for Real Colorado Foxes in the USL Premier Development League.

== Career ==
=== College ===
Thompson attended Highlands Ranch High School, and played four years of college soccer at the Colorado School of Mines.

=== Professional ===
He was drafted in the second round with the 28th overall selection of the 2008 MLS Supplemental Draft by Houston Dynamo, but was waived by Dynamo before playing a senior game, and was eventually picked up by D.C. United on June 30. He made his full professional debut on July 1, 2008, as a second-half substitute in a 2008 Lamar Hunt U.S. Open Cup third-round game against Rochester Rhinos. He subsequently played in the 2008 North American SuperLiga, starting his team's first two games against Chivas Guadalajara and Atlante F.C., and made six MLS appearances before being waived at the end of the 2008 season.

Having been unable to secure a professional contract elsewhere, Thompson signed with the Real Colorado Foxes of the USL Premier Development League in 2009.

== Honors ==
=== D.C. United ===
- Lamar Hunt U.S. Open Cup (1): 2008
