= Carlos Calderón (Salvadoran footballer) =

Salvadoran footballer (born 1986)

Personal information
- Full name: Carlos Enrique Calderón Anaya
- Date of birth: January 8, 1986 (age 40)
- Place of birth: San Salvador, El Salvador
- Height: 1.84 m (6 ft 0 in)
- Position: Forward

Youth career
- 1998–2002: Atlético Marte

Senior career*
Years	Team	Apps	(Gls)
2003–2004	Atlético Marte		
2004–2009	Luis Ángel Firpo		
2009	Atlético Marte	3	(1)
2010–2013	Marte Soyapango		
2015	C.D. Sonsonate		

International career
2007	El Salvador	4	(0)
- * Club domestic league appearances and goals

Carlos Enrique Calderón Anaya (born January 18, 1986) is a Salvadoran former footballer who played as a forward.

== Club career ==
Calderón was born in San Salvador, El Salvador. He started his career at Atlético Marte and moved to Luis Ángel Firpo in August 2004. He played for Luis Ángel Firpo in the 2008–09 CONCACAF Champions League Group Stage. He was loaned back for six months to Marte in 2009 but injury deprived him from playing too many games so Marte released him. In November 2010 he suffered a knee injury while playing for Marte Soyapango, which kept him out for another few months.

== International career ==
Calderón made his debut for El Salvador in an August 2007 friendly match against Honduras and has, as of January 2011, earned a total of four caps, scoring no goals. His most recent international was an October 2007 friendly match against Trinidad and Tobago.
