= Erik Ustruck =

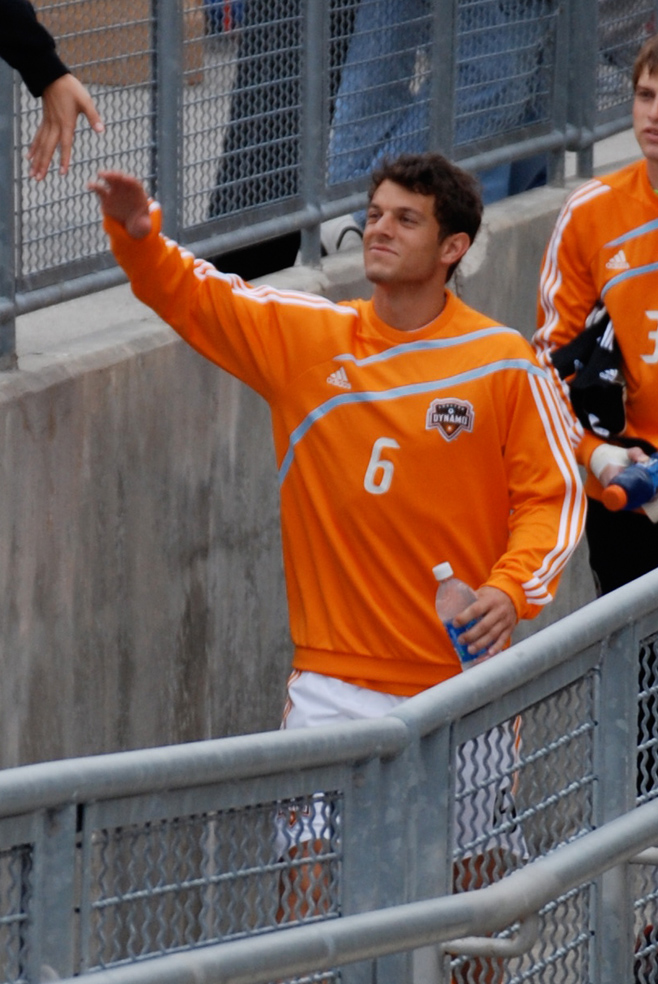

Personal information
- Full name: Erik John Ustruck
- Date of birth: January 4, 1985 (age 41)
- Place of birth: St. Louis, Missouri, United States
- Height: 5 ft 10 in (1.78 m)
- Positions: Defender; midfielder

Youth career
- 2003–2006: Santa Clara Broncos

Senior career*
Years	Team	Apps	(Gls)
2007–2009	Houston Dynamo	2	(0)
2009	→ Austin Aztex (loan)	5	(0)
2010	FC Tampa Bay	5	(0)
2011–2013	Orlando City	48	(2)

International career^{‡}
2004	United States U20	2	(0)
2013–2014	Guam	3	(0)
- * Club domestic league appearances and goals as of November 17, 2013 ‡ National team caps and goals as of November 17, 2013

Erik John Ustruck (born January 4, 1985, in St. Louis, Missouri) is former soccer player for the Guam national football team. He played for Orlando City in the USL Professional Division before his retirement from club soccer in 2013. Ustruck was Director of Soccer Operations for Orlando City SC of Major League Soccer and General Manager for Orlando Pride of NWSL before departing professional soccer in 2021.

== Career ==
=== College ===
Ustruck played four years at Santa Clara University, scoring eight goals during his collegiate career and fighting back from a knee injury during his junior year. Ustruck finished as Freshman of the Year runner-up in the West Coast Conference while earning All-Conference honors following his Freshman and Senior years. He was noted for his versatility and work ethic.

=== Professional ===
Ustruck was drafted by the Dynamo in the third round of the 2007 MLS Supplemental Draft – a draft that he watched online with his friends – as the 39th supplemental pick overall. Though he played as both a forward and a midfielder in college, Ustruck appears likely to be converted to a right back or right-sided midfielder in MLS.

Ustruck made his full professional debut for Dynamo on 10 July 2007, in a US Open Cup third-round game against Charleston Battery. He was a member of the Houston Dynamo squad that won the 2007 MLS Cup.

He was sent on loan to Austin Aztex on June 16, 2009.

After returning from his short loan spell, Ustruck made his MLS debut, coming on as a sub in Houston's 2–1 loss to Seattle Sounders FC on the road in Seattle.

Ustruck was waived by Houston on March 24, 2010, and signed a one-year contract with the FC Tampa Bay on April 5, 2010.

After his contract was up for FC Tampa Bay, Ustruck signed a multi-year contract with USL Pro club Orlando City on March 18, 2011.

=== International ===
He played several games with the Under-20 United States national team in 2004, but never made an official FIFA or confederation appearance for the senior team, so he is not cap tied to any National federation. He was also selected into the Guam National team preliminary squad for the AFC Challenge Cup qualifiers in February 2013. He made his debut for the Matao against Laos in November 2013 during the FIFA International friendly between the two nations.

== Honours ==
Houston Dynamo

- MLS Cup: 2007

Orlando City

- USL Pro: 2011, 2013
