= Guy-Roland Kpene =

Ivorian footballer (born 1983)

Personal information
- Full name: Guy-Roland Kpene
- Date of birth: November 23, 1983 (age 42)
- Place of birth: Abidjan, Ivory Coast
- Height: 5 ft 11 in (1.80 m)
- Position: Forward

Team information
- Current team: Long Island Rough Riders
- Number: 9

Youth career
- 2000: CSP Cocody
- 2003: Westchester Vikings

College career
Years	Team	Apps	(Gls)
2004–2006	Dowling Golden Lions		

Senior career*
Years	Team	Apps	(Gls)
2006	Brooklyn Knights	9	(6)
2007–2008	D.C. United	15	(0)
2008	Houston Dynamo	0	(0)
2011	Long Island Rough Riders	3	(1)
- * Club domestic league appearances and goals as of June 4, 2011

Guy-Roland Kpene (born November 23, 1983, in Abidjan) is an Ivorian footballer who currently plays as a forward for the Long Island Rough Riders.

== Career ==
=== Youth and college ===
After playing in the youth team of local Ivorian side CSP Cocody, Kpene moved with his family to the United States in 2003 when his mother accepted the job as Ivory Coast's finance attache to the United Nations in New York.

Kpene played one season of college soccer at Westchester Community College, earning all-region honors, before being recruited by Dowling College. He helped the Golden Lions to a 22–0–2 season and Dowling's first National Title. Kpene was Dowling's leading scorer, the first Dowling men's soccer player to be drafted by MLS, and only the fourth Golden Lion to be drafted in any sport. In his final season, he totaled 25 goals (including seven game-winning goals) and 10 assists. He was named to the 2006 NSCAA/adidas NCAA Division II Men's Collegiate All-American (second team) and earned ECAC Offensive Player of the Week and All-Conference honors. He graduated with a degree in finance.

In 2005, Kpene started all 19 games for the Golden Lions and led the team with 33 points and 13 goals (5 game winning). He was second on the team with 7 assists. Kpene was named to the All-NYCAC First Team and the NSCAA/adidas All Northeast Region First Team.

During his college years Kpene also played for the Brooklyn Knights in the USL Premier Development League, scoring 6 goals in 9 appearances in 2006.

=== Professional ===
Kpene was selected in the third round, 37th overall, by D.C. United in the 2007 MLS Supplemental Draft. He made his first MLS start on May 6, 2007, against Chivas USA, and assisted on the first goal by Christian Gomez to give the team the lead.

After being released by D.C. United during preseason, Kpene signed with the Houston Dynamo on May 7, 2008, having practiced with the team from mid-April and played in the team's April 20 reserve game as a guest player. He was released following the 2008 season.

In 2009, Kpene went to Europe to continue his career. He was with Bundesliga 2 side FSV Frankfurt, and with several teams in Belgium.

In 2011, Kpene, having returned to the United States, signed with the Long Island Rough Riders in the USL Premier Development League. He scored a goal for the Rough Riders on his debut on May 21, 2011, a 3–1 win over Jersey Express.

== Honors ==
=== D.C. United ===
- Major League Soccer Supporter's Shield (1): 2007
