= Kyle Brown (soccer) =

American soccer player

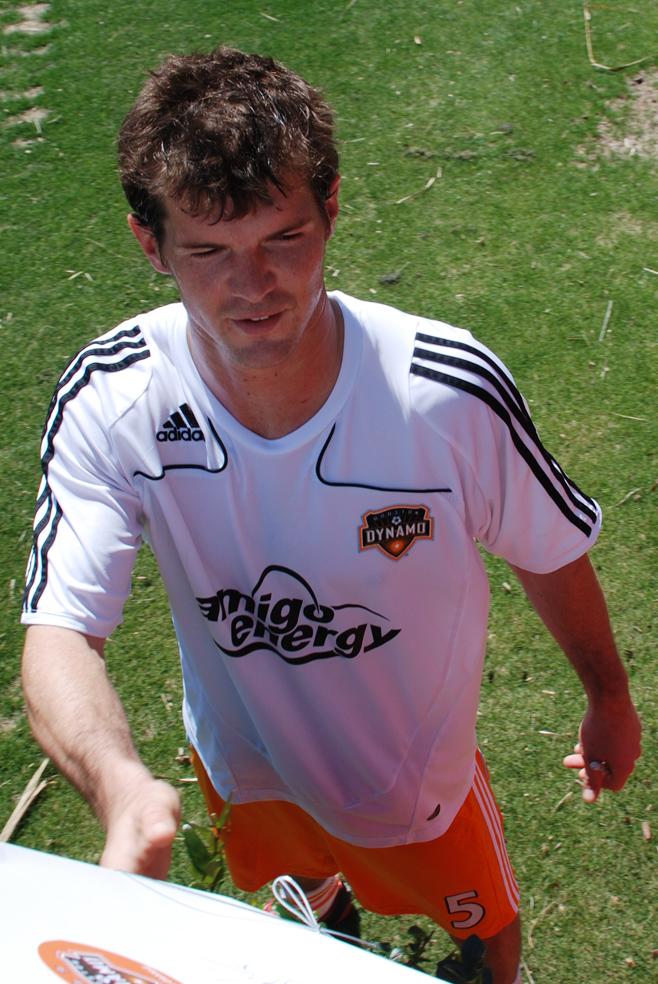

Personal information
- Full name: Kyle Brown
- Date of birth: August 10, 1983 (age 43)
- Place of birth: Southlake, Texas, United States
- Height: 5 ft 11 in (1.80 m)
- Position: Forward

College career
Years	Team	Apps	(Gls)
2001–2005	Tulsa Golden Hurricane		

Senior career*
Years	Team	Apps	(Gls)
2003	Texas Spurs	3	(0)
2004	Boulder Rapids Reserve	14	(10)
2005	Chicago Fire Premier	11	(6)
2006	New England Revolution	12	(0)
2007	Real Salt Lake	8	(2)
2008	Houston Dynamo	4	(0)
2009	Austin Aztex	25	(1)
- * Club domestic league appearances and goals as of 6 November 2009

Kyle Brown (born August 10, 1983, in Southlake, Texas) is an American soccer player, currently without a club.

== Career ==
=== College and amateur ===
Brown attended Carroll High School, and played college soccer for the University of Tulsa from 2001 to 2005, receiving All-Conference honors in all four years he played. Throughout his career at Tulsa he appeared in 77 games, scoring 38 goals and notching 28 assists. During his college years, Brown also played for three seasons in the USL Premier Development League, for Texas Spurs, Boulder Rapids Reserve and Chicago Fire Premier.

=== Professional ===
Brown was selected in the third round, 35th overall in the 2006 MLS Superdraft by the New England Revolution, making 12 appearances for the team, before being traded to Real Salt Lake during the 2007 MLS Superdraft. He was waived by Real Salt Lake in March 2008, but was selected by MLS Cup winners Houston Dynamo in the Waiver Draft shortly thereafter. Although he made eight scoreless appearances for the senior club, he led the Dynamo reserve team with 11 goals in 12 appearances.

Brown was released by Houston on December 12, 2008, and in February 2009 Brown was signed by the Austin Aztex. He made 25 appearances and scored 1 goal for the Aztex in their debut season, but was released at the end of the year.
