= Clemente Ovalle =

Mexican footballer (born 1982)

Personal information
- Full name: Clemente Ovalle Barbosa
- Date of birth: October 5, 1982 (age 44)
- Place of birth: Monterrey, Nuevo León, Mexico
- Height: 1.75 m (5 ft 9 in)
- Position: Midfielder

Senior career*
Years	Team	Apps	(Gls)
2005–2006	Monterrey	14	(1)
2007–2011	Atlante	42	(3)
2011	Mérida		
- * Club domestic league appearances and goals as of 1 March 2008

Clemente Ovalle Barbosa (born 5 October 1982) is a Mexican former professional footballer, who last played as a midfielder for Mérida. He made his debut March 12, 2005 against Chiapas in a game which resulted in a 1–1 tie. With 5 minutes left during the final between Atlante vs. Pumas UNAM, Clemente scored the winning goal.

== Honours ==
Atlante

- Apertura 2007
