= Mike Chabala =

American soccer player (born 1984)

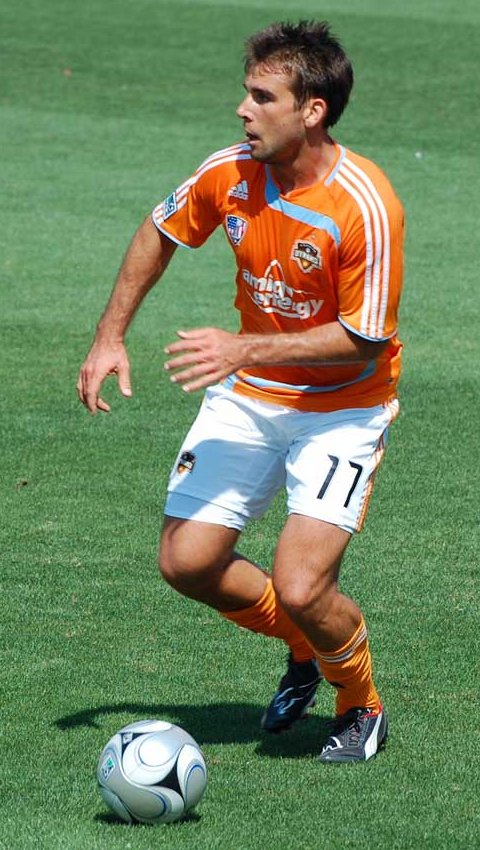

Personal information
- Full name: Michael Shaun Chabala
- Date of birth: May 24, 1984 (age 42)
- Place of birth: Fresno, California, United States
- Height: 6 ft 0 in (1.83 m)
- Position: Left-back

College career
Years	Team	Apps	(Gls)
2002–2005	Washington Huskies		

Senior career*
Years	Team	Apps	(Gls)
2004	Yakima Reds	5	(2)
2005	Fresno Fuego	3	(0)
2006–2011	Houston Dynamo	47	(1)
2006	→ Portland Timbers (loan)	9	(0)
2009	→ Austin Aztex (loan)	2	(0)
2011–2012	Portland Timbers	23	(1)
2012	D.C. United	3	(0)
2013	Houston Dynamo	4	(0)
Total		96	(4)
- * Club domestic league appearances and goals

Michael Shaun Chabala (born May 24, 1984) is an American former professional soccer player who played as a left-back.

== Career ==
Chabala played college soccer at the University of Washington, and also played with in the USL Premier Development League with both Yakima Reds and his hometown team, Fresno Fuego.

Chabala was drafted in the fourth round (44th overall) of the 2006 MLS SuperDraft by Houston Dynamo. He was loaned to Portland Timbers of the USL First Division during his first year with the Dynamo, making nine appearances.

Having spent two years with Dynamo's reserves (where he made 24 starts and registered 12 assists, leading the MLS Reserve Division in 2007), Chabala finally made his full professional debut for Dynamo on July 10, 2007, in a US Open Cup third-round game against Charleston Battery. He made his second first team appearance on July 1, 2008, again in a US Open Cup third-round game against Charleston Battery. He also played on November 28, 2008, in a CONCACAF Champions League game against C.D. Luis Ángel Firpo, a game in which he played a full 90 minutes.

After four years on the Houston roster, Chabala finally made his MLS debut on April 11, 2009, as an 80th-minute substitute for Wade Barrett in a game against New York Red Bulls - and was given a red card for a 'serious foul play' 13 minutes later.

He was sent on loan to Austin Aztex on June 16, 2009. He returned in July and set career highs for games, starts, and minutes in the 2009 season.

On July 21, 2011, Chabala was traded to Portland Timbers along with Lovel Palmer and an international roster spot for Adam Moffat and allocation money. Impressive performances and his interaction with club supporters made him a fast favorite with Portland fans.

Chabala was traded to D.C. United on August 9, 2012, in exchange for a first round 2014 MLS Supplemental Draft pick. After the conclusion of the 2012 season, D.C. declined the 2013 option on Chabala's contract and he entered the 2012 MLS Re-Entry Draft. Chabala became a free agent after he went undrafted in both rounds of the draft.

After trialing with Houston Dynamo, Chabala returned to Houston on February 25, 2013.
