= Tony Caig =

English footballer & coach (born 1974)

- Caig with Workington in 2009

Personal information
- Full name: Antony Caig
- Date of birth: 11 April 1974 (age 52)
- Place of birth: Cleator Moor, Cumbria, England
- Height: 6 ft 0 in (1.83 m)
- Position: Goalkeeper

Team information
- Current team: Newcastle United (head of academy goalkeeping)

Senior career*
Years	Team	Apps	(Gls)
1990–1999	Carlisle United	284	(0)
1999–2001	Blackpool	61	(0)
2000–2001	→ Charlton Athletic (loan)	0	(0)
2001	Charlton Athletic	1	(0)
2001–2003	Hibernian	14	(0)
2003–2006	Newcastle United	0	(0)
2004	→ Barnsley (loan)	3	(0)
2006–2007	Vancouver Whitecaps	39	(0)
2007–2008	Gretna	9	(0)
2008	Houston Dynamo	12	(0)
2009	Chesterfield	0	(0)
2009–2010	Workington	49	(0)
Total		472	(0)
- * Club domestic league appearances and goals

Antony Caig (born 11 April 1974) is an English football coach and former player, who played as a goalkeeper. He is currently the head of academy goalkeeping for Premier League Club Newcastle United.

Caig is also the Northern Ireland national team goalkeeping coach.

== Playing career ==
Caig made his name playing for Carlisle United from 1990 to 1998, some highlights of this time being the penalty saves in the Football League Trophy at Wembley against Colchester United in 1997 and winning the third division championship in 1994–95 setting a then clean sheet record. However, in 1998 he was controversially allowed to leave by club owner Michael Knighton before the end-season transfer deadline. He had made 244 league and 40 cup appearances for the club. Caig's departure left Carlisle United without a permanent goalkeeper, circumstances which led to a famous goal by on-loan goalkeeper Jimmy Glass saving the club from relegation.

He then joined Blackpool on 25 March 1999 for a reported small fee of £40,000; he was able to establish himself as a regular in the first team, and won a place in the Carling Opta Division Two "Team of the Week" in October 1999. He made 49 league appearances and 12 cup appearances in his two-year stint at Bloomfield Road, during which time he was sent on loan to Charlton Athletic, before signing for them permanently in 2001. However, he was to make just one Premier League appearance for them against Derby County before moving to Scotland later that same year to join Scottish Premier League (SPL) club Hibernian. Although not a regular starter and made 14 appearances in 18 months at the club.

In January 2003 Caig moved back to England and joined Premier League club Newcastle United. However, he spent three years at St James' Park without making a first team appearance, being backup to long time goalkeepers Shay Given and Steve Harper. He spent a short loan spell at Barnsley and in 2006 he signed for USL First Division club, Vancouver Whitecaps in Canada on 13 April 2006. He made his first appearance for them on 14 May 2006. With the Whitecaps he won the 2006 USL First Division Championship, when they beat Rochester Raging Rhinos 2–0 in the Play-offs Final. He also kept eleven clean sheets, and in doing so broke Mike Franks' record of ten clean sheets in 2003.

On 20 June 2007, the Whitecaps announced that Caig would be returning to England for personal reasons despite having signed with the Whitecaps through the end of the season. He had played a total of 39 games for the Whitecaps. He signed on amateur terms with SPL club Gretna in October 2007 after a long running transfer saga. The SPL had initially objected to Gretna signing Caig because he had still been under contract with Vancouver at the closure of the summer 2007 transfer window. Caig played nine times for Gretna in the league and cup in a short spell and also served as a goalkeeping coach.

He then moved to Houston Dynamo in January 2008, where he was to serve as cover to Pat Onstad. He made his Dynamo debut on 6 April 2008 as a substitute after Onstad was injured. Due to Onstad's injury, Caig played again on 9 April in the 2008 CONCACAF Champions' Cup semi-final 2nd leg against Costa Rican club Deportivo Saprissa, Caig then played other MLS and Concacaf Champions league games before returning to the UK at the end of that MLS season. On returning to England he signed for Chesterfield on a short-term deal. After leaving Chesterfield, Caig signed a deal to join Workington of the Conference North to team up with former Carlisle teammate Darren Edmondson, now the manager of Workington.

== Coaching career ==
Caig started coaching Carlisle United's goalkeepers while still playing for Workington where he won the Non-League Goalkeeper of the Year award for 2009–10 and also the Reds Player of the Year award and National supporters award in helping Workington to a fourth-place finish. Carlisle then entered negotiations with Workington to allow Caig to combine his coaching duties with serving as an understudy to current first choice goalkeeper Adam Collin. During the 2014–15 season he was, alongside Paul Thirlwell, made caretaker manager for four games following the dismissal of Graham Kavanagh as manager. After an injury to first choice goalkeeper Mark Gillespie in September 2014, Caig was re-registered as a player to provide cover for backup goalkeeper Dan Hanford. He was allocated the number 29 shirt.

In June 2015 Caig signed for Hartlepool United as a goalkeeping coach, the same role he held at Carlisle United. He left Hartlepool United in January 2017 due to a change of management and took a role at Newcastle United Academy coaching the 12–16 goalkeepers, then in June 2017 left Newcastle and became Bury head goalkeeping coach, assisting Lee Clark and Alan Thompson. Caig's contract was terminated once Bury were expelled from the English Football League, he then took up a position as a goalkeeping coach of Scottish Premiership club Livingston. On 26 November 2020, Caig and David Martindale became co-caretaker managers of Livingston following Gary Holt's resignation. He initially stayed with the club after Martindale was appointed manager on a permanent basis, but left Livingston in May 2021 to focus on coaching work with the Scottish Football Association.

Caig briefly joined Scottish League One club Falkirk as part-time goalkeeping coach in June 2021, before taking the Head of Goalkeeping Performance position on a full-time basis at Premiership level with Dundee United the following month.

In 2022 Caig returned to Newcastle United to take up a new position of head of academy goalkeeping, co-ordinating the staff and development program of the 9–21s goalkeepers, in March 2024 Caig became the Northern Ireland national team goalkeeping coach a role he combines with his role at Newcastle United.

== Honours ==
Carlisle United

- Football League Third Division: 1994–95; promotion: 1996–97
- Football League Trophy: 1996–97, 2010–11; runner-up: 1994–95

Vancouver Whitecaps

- USL First Division: 2006

Individual

- PFA Team of the Year: 1996–97 Third Division
- National Conference Keeper of the Year 2009–10
