= 2006 Houston Dynamo season =

Houston Dynamo
2006 season
- Owner: Philip Anschutz (AEG)
- President COO: Oliver Luck; Chris Canetti
- Head coach: Dominic Kinnear
- Stadium: Robertson Stadium
- Major League Soccer: Conference: 2nd Overall: 5th
- MLS Cup Playoffs: Winners
- U.S. Open Cup: Semifinals
- Top goalscorer: League: Brian Ching; Dwayne De Rosario 11 goals each All: Brian Ching: 14 goals
Home colors	Away colors

The 2006 Houston Dynamo season was the inaugural season of the club.

The team was created on December 15, 2005 when the San Jose Earthquakes were relocated, due to owner AEG's failure to secure a soccer-specific stadium. Although effectively a relocation of the Earthquakes, the team name, intellectual property, and statistical history were not carried over to Houston, with the Earthquakes instead being treated as having gone "inactive", while the Dynamo are regarded as a new club formed in 2005. The Earthquakes would be "reactivated" through league expansion in 2008. This agreement was identical to establishment of the Baltimore Ravens of the National Football League.

== First season ==
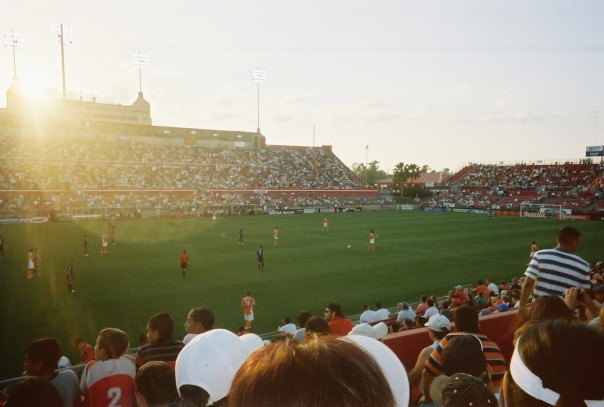
Houston Dynamo vs Colorado Rapids on April 2, 2006

The Dynamo played their first game on April 2, 2006. Amidst a crowd of 25,462 people in Robertson Stadium, the Dynamo beat the Colorado Rapids 5–2. Brian Ching led the charge for the Dynamo with four goals, all of which were set up with assists from teammate Dwayne De Rosario. In stoppage time, Alejandro Moreno scored MLS' Goal of the Week with a game-clinching bicycle kick. On May 6, 2006, the Houston Dynamo won their first intrastate rivalry game against FC Dallas, 4–3 at Robertson Stadium. Craig Waibel had a career year for the Dynamo, ending up one of the finalists for defender of the year. He logged 5 goals and 1 assist during the regular season. Ronald Cerritos and Julian Nash were released in June to make room for Paul Dalglish.

Mike Chabala, Stuart Holden, Martin Hutton, Patrick Ianni, Mpho Moloi, Adrian Serioux, and Zach Wells were the new additions to the pre existing San Jose Earthquakes 2005 Roster.

The Dynamo finished their first season in Houston with an 11–8–13 record, good for second place in the Western Conference. They lost the first game of the two-legged conference semifinal to C.D. Chivas USA, 2–1, on October 22 in Los Angeles. Chivas goalkeeper Brad Guzan stopped De Rosario on a penalty kick that could have tied the match.

In the second leg on October 29, Houston defeated Chivas USA 2–0 at Robertson Stadium, advancing in dramatic fashion. After a red card to Chivas' Juan Francisco Palencia, Houston's Brad Davis converted a second-half penalty kick to tie the aggregate score. With the match in second-half stoppage time, Brian Ching headed in the winning goal from close range to delight the crowd of more than 17,000.

On November 5, 2006, the Dynamo defeated the Colorado Rapids 3–1 in the Western Conference final to earn a spot in its first MLS Cup. Scottish forward Paul Dalglish scored twice in front of an MLS Cup Playoffs-high crowd of 23,107.

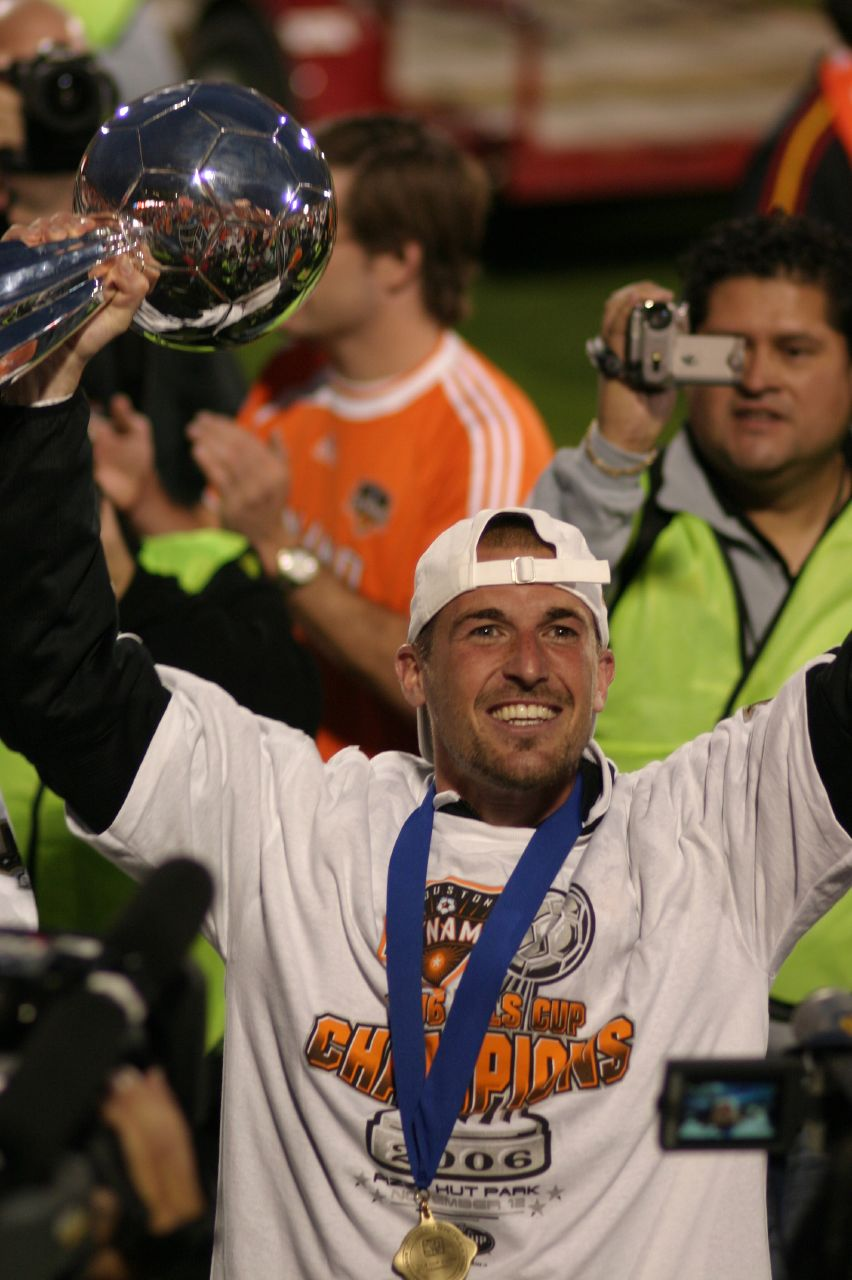
Paul Dalglish holds the trophy after the MLS Cup victory

On November 12, 2006, the Dynamo defeated the New England Revolution 4–3 on penalty kicks after a 1–1 tie to win the 2006 MLS Cup held at Pizza Hut Park in Frisco, Texas. The game was scoreless until the second session of extra time, when New England's Taylor Twellman scored. Only one minute and six seconds later, Brian Ching headed in the tying goal for Houston, and the championship was, for the first time in MLS history, decided by a shootout. Substitutes Kelly Gray and Stuart Holden made Houston's first two penalty kicks, and standouts Dwayne De Rosario and Brian Ching made the last two. Ching's gave Houston a 4–3 lead, and goalkeeper Pat Onstad stopped New England's Jay Heaps on the final attempt to secure the win.

With the win, the Dynamo advanced to the 2007 CONCACAF Champions' Cup.

=== 2006 Dynamo Squad ===
This is the final roster for the Houston Dynamo at the end of the 2006 Season. Note: Flags indicate national team as defined under FIFA eligibility rules; some limited exceptions apply. Players may hold more than one non-FIFA nationality.

No.	Pos.	Nation	Player
1	GK	USA	Zach Wells
2	DF	USA	Eddie Robinson
3	DF	USA	Kevin Goldthwaite
4	DF	USA	Chris Aloisi
5	DF	USA	Ryan Cochrane
6	DF	USA	Kelly Gray
7	MF	USA	Chris Wondolowski
8	FW	SCO	Paul Dalglish
9	MF	USA	Brian Mullan
11	MF	USA	Brad Davis
12	FW	USA	Julian Nash
13	MF	USA	Ricardo Clark
14	MF	CAN	Dwayne De Rosario

No.	Pos.	Nation	Player
15	FW	VEN	Alejandro Moreno
16	DF	USA	Craig Waibel
17	MF	USA	Mike Chabala
18	GK	CAN	Pat Onstad
19	DF	USA	Patrick Ianni
21	MF	USA	Aaron Lanes
22	MF	USA	Stuart Holden
23	MF	RSA	Mpho Moloi
24	DF	USA	Wade Barrett (captain)
25	FW	USA	Brian Ching
26	FW	USA	Marcus Storey
30	GK	USA	Martin Hutton
51	MF	CAN	Adrian Serioux

== Player movement ==
Players who were with the Earthquakes at the end of the 2005 season and moved to Houston are not listed. Likewise, players who were with the Earthquakes and were released, retired, or out of contract after the 2005 season and did not move with the team to Houston are not listed.

=== In ===
Per Major League Soccer and club policies terms of the deals do not get disclosed.

Date	Player	Position	Age	Previous club	Notes	Ref
January 20, 2006	(United States) Patrick Ianni	DF	20	UCLA	Selected with the 8th overall pick in the 2006 MLS SuperDraft	
January 20, 2006	(United States) Zach Wells	GK	24	(United States) MetroStars	Acquired in exchange for a 4th round pick in the 2006 MLS SuperDraft	
January 20, 2006	(United States) Andre Schmid	FW	22	St. John's University	Selected with the 8th pick in the 3rd round (32nd overall) in the 2006 MLS SuperDraft	
January 20, 2006	(United States) Mike Chabala	MF	21	University of Washington	Selected with the 8th pick in the 4th round (44th overall) in the 2006 MLS SuperDraft	
January 26, 2006	(South Africa) Mpho Moloi	MF	22	University of Connecticut	Selected with the 7th overall pick in the 2006 MLS Supplemental Draft	
February 16, 2006	(United States) Marcus Storey	FW	23	(United States) Columbus Crew	Acquired in exchange for a 2nd round pick in the 2007 MLS Supplemental Draft	
March 24, 2006	(Canada) Adrian Serioux	MF	26	(United States) New York Red Bulls	Acquired in exchange for Danny O'Rourke	
April 18, 2006	(United States) Stuart Holden	MF	20	(England) Sunderland	Free Transfer	
August 17, 2006	(Scotland) Paul Dalglish	MF	29	(Scotland) Hibernian	Free Transfer	

=== Out ===
Date	Player	Position	Age	Destination Club	Notes	Ref
March 24, 2006	(United States) Danny O'Rourke	DF	22	(United States) New York Red Bulls	Traded to New York Red Bulls in exchange for Adrian Serioux	
	(United States) Andre Schmid	FW	22	(United States) New York Red Bulls	Released. Joined the reserves for the Red Bulls	
August 21, 2006	(El Salvador) Ronald Cerritos	FW	31	(United States) San Salvador	Released	

=== Loans ===
Per Major League Soccer and club policies terms of the deals do not get disclosed.

==== Out ====
Date	Player	Position	Loaned to	Notes	Ref
	(United States) Mike Chabala	MF	(United States) Portland Timbers		
June 29, 2006	(United States) Martin Hutton	GK	(United States) Portland Timbers		

== Friendlies ==
=== Carolina Challenge Cup ===
March 17, 2006 Carolina Challenge Cup	Charleston Battery	0–1	Houston Dynamo	Charleston, South Carolina
7:00 PM (CST)		Report	Cerritos 74'	Stadium: Blackbaud Stadium

March 22, 2006 Carolina Challenge Cup	D.C. United	1–1	Houston Dynamo	Charleston, South Carolina
7:00 PM (CST)	J. Moreno 30' (pen.)	Report	A. Moreno 28'	Stadium: Blackbaud Stadium

March 25, 2006 Carolina Challenge Cup	New York Red Bulls	0–3	Houston Dynamo	Charleston, South Carolina
7:00 PM (CST)		Report	Ching 29'; Cochrane 70'; Mullan 80'	Stadium: Blackbaud Stadium; Attendance: 4,032

== Competitions ==
=== Major League Soccer ===
==== Standings ====
===== Western Conference =====
Pos	Team	Pld	W	L	T	GF	GA	GD	Pts	Qualification
1	FC Dallas	32	16	12	4	48	44	+4	52	MLS Cup Playoffs
2	Houston Dynamo	32	11	8	13	44	40	+4	46	MLS Cup Playoffs
3	Chivas USA	32	10	9	13	45	42	+3	43	MLS Cup Playoffs
4	Colorado Rapids	32	11	13	8	36	49	−13	41	MLS Cup Playoffs
5	Los Angeles Galaxy	32	11	15	6	37	37	0	39	
6	Real Salt Lake	32	10	13	9	45	49	−4	39	

Source: MLS

===== Overall =====
Pos	Team	Pld	W	L	T	GF	GA	GD	Pts	Qualification
1	D.C. United (S)	32	15	7	10	52	38	+14	55	CONCACAF Champions' Cup
2	FC Dallas	32	16	12	4	48	44	+4	52	North American SuperLiga
3	New England Revolution	32	12	8	12	39	35	+4	48	
4	Chicago Fire	32	13	11	8	43	41	+2	47	
5	Houston Dynamo (C)	32	11	8	13	44	40	+4	46	CONCACAF Champions' Cup
6	Chivas USA	32	10	9	13	45	42	+3	43	
7	Colorado Rapids	32	11	13	8	36	49	−13	41	
8	New York Red Bulls	32	9	11	12	41	41	0	39	
9	Los Angeles Galaxy	32	11	15	6	37	37	0	39	North American SuperLiga
10	Real Salt Lake	32	10	13	9	45	49	−4	39	
11	Kansas City Wizards	32	10	14	8	43	45	−2	38	
12	Columbus Crew	32	8	15	9	30	42	−12	33	

Source: MLS
Rules for classification: 1) points; 2) head-to-head record; 3) goal difference; 4) number of goals scored
(C) Champions; (S) Supporters' Shield

==== Matches ====
April 2, 2006 1	Houston Dynamo	5–2	Colorado Rapids	Houston, Texas
6:30 PM(CDT)	Ching 13', 37', 44', 72'; Moreno 90+2'	Report	Beckerman 14'; Wingert (yellow card) 32'; Mastroeni (yellow card) 45+3' (yellow-red card) 86'; Kirovski 52'; Petke (yellow card) 62'	Stadium: Robertson Stadium; Attendance: 25,462; Referee: Alex Prus

April 8, 2006 2	Houston Dynamo	1–2	Kansas City Wizards	Houston, Texas
7:30 PM(CDT)	Goldthwaite (yellow card) 16'; De Rosario (red card) 87'; Ching 64'; Mullan (yellow card) 73'	Report	Victorine 66'; Burciaga Jr. 90' (yellow card) 54' (yellow-red card) 90+1'; Arnaud (yellow card) 71'; Thomas (yellow card) 84'	Stadium: Robertson Stadium; Attendance: 20,342; Referee: Erich Simmons

April 15, 2006 3	D.C. United	2–0	Houston Dynamo	Washington, D.C.
6:30 PM(CDT)	Gros 25'; Carroll (yellow card) 32'; Gómez 71'	Report	Serioux (yellow card) 53'; Cochrane (yellow card) 70'	Stadium: RFK Stadium; Attendance: 15,015; Referee: Abiodun Okulaja

April 22, 2006 4	Houston Dynamo	2–1	Real Salt Lake	Houston, Texas
7:30 PM(CDT)	Waibel 60'; Serioux (yellow card) 69'; De Rosario 84'	Report	Cunningham (yellow card) 8' (goal) 54'; Talley (yellow card) 68'	Stadium: Robertson Stadium; Attendance: 16,904; Referee: Gus St. Silva

April 29, 2006 5	Colorado Rapids	0–1	Houston Dynamo	Denver, Colorado
8:00 PM(CDT)	Petke (yellow card) 37'	Report	Ching 15'; Moreno (yellow card) 66' (yellow-red card) 86'; Waibel (yellow card) 72'; Onstad (yellow card) 80'	Stadium: Invesco Field at Mile High; Attendance: 7,225; Referee: Silviu Petrescu

May 6, 2006 6 Texas Derby	Houston Dynamo	4–3	FC Dallas	Houston, Texas
7:30 PM(CDT)	Clark 31'; Ching 35'; De Rosario 45'; Serioux (yellow card) 48'; Davis (yellow card) 75'; De Rosario 67'	Report	Sala (yellow card) 31'; Ruiz (yellow card) 33' (goal) 60'; Núñez 61'; Miña (yellow card) 62'; Moor 76'; O'Brien (yellow card) 89'	Stadium: Robertson Stadium; Attendance: 21,448; Referee: Abbey Okulaja

May 13, 2006 7 Texas Derby	FC Dallas	1–1	Houston Dynamo	Frisco, Texas
3:00 PM(CDT)	Ruiz (yellow card) 17' (goal) 19'	Report	Robinson (yellow card) 45+3'; Goodson 81' (o.g.)	Stadium: Pizza Hut Park; Attendance: 12,756; Referee: Brian Hall

May 20, 2006 8	Houston Dynamo	0–1	Chicago Fire	Houston, Texas
3:00 PM(CDT)	Mullan (yellow card) 28'; Waibel (yellow card) 84'; Davis (red card) 90+2'	Report	Thiago 50'; Brown (yellow card) 15'	Stadium: Robertson Stadium; Attendance: 15,742; Referee: Hilario Grajeda

May 27, 2006 9	New England Revolution	1–1	Houston Dynamo	Foxborough, Massachusetts
6:30 PM(CDT)	Heaps (yellow card) 34'; Ralston 55'	Report	Clark (yellow card) 45+2'; Robinson (yellow card) 58'; Cochrane 85'	Stadium: Gillette Stadium; Attendance: 10,882; Referee: Shane Moody

June 3, 2006 10	Houston Dynamo	2–1	LA Galaxy	Houston, Texas
7:30 PM(CDT)	De Rosario 22'; Robinson 85'	Report	Saragosa (yellow card) 23'; Dunivant (yellow card) 31'; Wolyniec 45+1' (yellow card) 52'; Ihemelu (yellow card) 79'	Stadium: Robertson Stadium; Attendance: 14,215; Referee: Steven DePiero

June 10, 2006 11	New York Red Bulls	1–1	Houston Dynamo	East Rutherford, New Jersey
6:30 PM(CDT)	Jean-Philippe 2'; Mendes (yellow card) 17'; Stammler (yellow card) 73'	Report	Clark 19'; Mullan (yellow card) 32'; Robinson (yellow card) 52'	Stadium: Giants Stadium; Attendance: 9,617; Referee: Baldomero Toledo

June 17, 2006 12	Houston Dynamo	2–1	Real Salt Lake	Houston, Texas
7:30 PM(CDT)	Mullan (yellow card) 34' (goal) 36'; Robinson (yellow card) 55'; Moreno 83'; Onstad (yellow card) 87'	Report	Talley (yellow card) 15'; Garlick (yellow card) 22'; Cutler (yellow card) 34'; Williams (yellow card) 59'; Kreis 88' (pen.)	Stadium: Robertson Stadium; Attendance: 13,824; Referee: Ben Jones

June 24, 2006 13	LA Galaxy	0–0	Houston Dynamo	Carson, California
9:30 PM(CDT)	Saragosa (yellow card) 64'; Nagamura (yellow card) 70'	Report	Cochrane (yellow card) 10'; Robinson (yellow card) 82'	Stadium: Home Depot Center; Attendance: 17,485; Referee: Alex Prus

June 28, 2006 14	Chivas USA	1–1	Houston Dynamo	Carson, California
9:30 PM(CDT)	Llamosa (yellow card) 32'; Marsch 75'; Hernandez (yellow card) 90+1'	Report	De Rosario 55'	Stadium: Home Depot Center; Attendance: 9,689; Referee: Tim Weyland

July 4, 2006 15	Houston Dynamo	1–1	Columbus Crew	Houston, Texas
7:30 PM(CDT)	Ching 5'; Clark (yellow card) 39'; Robinson (yellow card) 73'	Report	Kotschau (yellow card) 27'; Gaven 66' (pen.); Ngwenya (yellow card) 72'; Bisaku (yellow card) 73'	Stadium: Robertson Stadium; Attendance: 8,497; Referee: Jair Marrufo

July 8, 2006 16	Houston Dynamo	3–1	Chivas USA	Houston, Texas
4:00 PM(CDT)	Ching 19'; Waibel (yellow card) 60'; Mullan 64'; Moreno 84'	Report	Razov 8'; Kljestan (yellow card) 66'; Mendoza (yellow card) 72'	Stadium: Robertson Stadium; Attendance: 11,735; Referee: Ricardo Salazar

July 15, 2006 17	Kansas City Wizards	2–3	Houston Dynamo	Kansas City, Missouri
7:30 PM(CDT)	Wolff 23'; Conrad 87'	Report	Robinson 21'; Davis 56'; Ching 66'	Stadium: Arrowhead Stadium; Attendance: 8,196; Referee: Brian Hall

July 22, 2006 18	Houston Dynamo	1–1	New England Revolution	Houston, Texas
7:30 PM(CDT)	Barrett (yellow card) 33' (yellow-red card) 72'; Davis (yellow card) 35'; Hulden 63'; Ricardo Clark (yellow card) 66'; Ching (yellow card) 66'	Report	Dorman (yellow card) 18'; Parkhurst (yellow card) 30'; Heaps (red card) 52'; Waibel 60' (o.g.)	Stadium: Robertson Stadium; Attendance: 10,210; Referee: Michael Kennedy

July 26, 2006 19	Colorado Rapids	1–0	Houston Dynamo	Denver, Colorado
8:30 PM(CDT)	Martins (yellow card) 12'; Hernández 35'; Mastroeni (yellow card) 56'	Report	Dwayne De Rosario (yellow card) 38'; Davis (yellow card) 56'; Goldthwaite (yellow card) 90+3'	Stadium: Invesco Field at Mile High; Attendance: 4,220; Referee: Terry Vaughn

July 29, 2006 20	Houston Dynamo	1–1	New York Red Bulls	Houston, Texas
7:30 PM(CDT)	De Rosario 70' (pen.) (red card) 71'	Report	Guevara (yellow card) 26'; Stammler (yellow card) 58'; Henderson 67'; O'Rourke (yellow card) 69' (yellow-red card) 71'	Stadium: Robertson Stadium; Attendance: 10,334; Referee: Tim Weyland

August 9, 2006 21	Houston Dynamo	0–1	LA Galaxy	Houston, Texas
7:00 PM(CDT)	Robinson (yellow card) 55'	Report	Vagenas (yellow card) 40'; Gardner (yellow card) 56'; Jazic (yellow card) 61'; Quaranta 69'	Stadium: Reliant Stadium; Attendance: 70,550; Referee: Ricardo Salazar

August 12, 2006 22 Texas Derby	Houston Dynamo	1–0	FC Dallas	Houston, Texas
7:30 PM(CDT)	Waibel 37'; Robinson (yellow card) 58'; Cochrane (yellow card) 77'	Report	Rhine (yellow card) 40'; O'Brien (yellow card) 45'	Stadium: Robertson Stadium; Attendance: 10,964; Referee: Abbey Okulaja

August 19, 2006 23	Real Salt Lake	3–1	Houston Dynamo	Salt Lake City Utah
8:00 PM(CDT)	Klein 45+2'; Sequeira 64' (yellow card) 77'; Garlick (yellow card) 78'; Cunningham 82'	Report	De Rosario (yellow card) 60'; Serioux 72'; Gray (yellow card) 90+2'	Stadium: Rice–Eccles Stadium; Attendance: 14,091; Referee: Jorge Gonzalez

August 26, 2006 24	Chivas USA	3–2	Houston Dynamo	Carson, California
10:00 PM(CDT)	Bornstein 8'; Razov 45', 57'; Arias (yellow card) 84'	Report	De Rosario 28' (pen.), 59'; Clark (red card) 31'	Stadium: Home Depot Center; Attendance: 13,665; Referee: Alex Prus

August 30, 2006 25	Chicago Fire	2–2	Houston Dynamo	Bridgeview, Illinois
8:00 PM(CDT)	Mapp 36'; Carr (yellow card) 53'; Herron 75' (pen.); Armas (yellow card) 90+4'	Report	Robinson (yellow card) 27'; Wondolowski 42'; De Rosario 59'; Alejandro Moreno (yellow card) 68'	Stadium: Toyota Park; Attendance: 7,858; Referee: Baldomero Toledo

September 2, 2006 26 Texas Derby	FC Dallas	1–0	Houston Dynamo	Frisco, Texas
7:30 PM(CDT)	Álvarez 36' (yellow card) 78'; Gbandi (yellow card) 37'; Yi (yellow card) 52'; Ruiz (yellow card) 65'	Report	Robinson (yellow card) 27' (red card) 31'	Stadium: Pizza Hut Park; Attendance: 14,316; Referee: Brian Hall

September 10, 2006 27	LA Galaxy	1–2	Houston Dynamo	Carson, California
7:00 PM(CDT)	Donovan 29'; Quaranta (yellow card) 64'	Report	Serioux (yellow card) 22'; Clark (yellow card) 28'; Waibel 32'; Mullan (yellow card) 51' (yellow-red card) 66'; De Rosario 56'	Stadium: Home Depot Center; Attendance: 20,145; Referee: Abbey Okulaja

September 17, 2006 28	Houston Dynamo	0–0	Chivas USA	Houston, Texas
7:30 PM(CDT)	Dalglish (yellow card) 47'; Gray (yellow card) 57'	Report	Suárez (yellow card) 23'; Regan (yellow card) 23' (yellow-red card) 59'	Stadium: Robertson Stadium; Attendance: 15,510; Referee: Jorge Gonzalez

September 23, 2006 29	Columbus Crew	1–1	Houston Dynamo	Columbus, Ohio
6:30 PM(CDT)	Virtuoso (yellow card) 25'; Garey 80'	Report	De Rosario 54'	Stadium: Columbus Crew Stadium; Attendance: 11,878; Referee: Terry Vaughn

September 30, 2006 30	Houston Dynamo	1–0	D.C. United	Houston, Texas
7:30 PM(CDT)	Robinson (yellow card) 27'; Dalglish (yellow card) 76'; Ching 86'	Report	Gros (yellow card) 43'; Gómez (yellow card) 45+1'	Stadium: Robertson Stadium; Attendance: 20,029; Referee: Brian Hall

October 7, 2006 31	Real Salt Lake	1–1	Houston Dynamo	Salt Lake City Utah
8:00 PM(CDT)	Talley (yellow card) 54'; Harris (yellow card) 56'; Ballouchy 60' (yellow card) 90+3'	Report	Dalglish 20' (yellow card) 78'; Cochrane (yellow card) 26'	Stadium: Rice–Eccles Stadium; Attendance: 22,515; Referee: Baldomero Toledo

October 14, 2006 32	Houston Dynamo	3–3	Colorado Rapids	Houston, Texas
7:30 PM(CDT)	Waibel 2', 73'; Dalglish 42'	Report	Martins 21', 55'; Peterson 88'	Stadium: Robertson Stadium; Attendance: 17,191; Referee: Jair Marrufo

=== MLS Cup Playoffs ===
October 22, 2006 Conference Seminfinals Leg 1	Chivas USA	2–1	Houston Dynamo	Carson, California
3:00 PM(CDT)	Mendoza (yellow card) 38'; Razov 45'; Palencia 68'	Report	De Rosario (yellow card) 37'; Ching 75'; Onstad (yellow card) 46'	Stadium: Home Depot Center; Attendance: 15,110; Referee: Jorge Gonzalez

October 29, 2006 Conference Seminfinals Leg 2	Houston Dynamo	2–0 (3–2 agg.)	Chivas USA	Houston, Texas
3:00 PM(CDT)	Clark (yellow card) 59'; Davis 64'; Serioux (yellow card) 67'; Ching 92'	Report	Vaughn (yellow card) 55'; Palencia (yellow card) 57' (yellow-red card) 58'; Regan (yellow card) 63'; García (yellow card) 64'	Stadium: Robertson Stadium; Attendance: 17,440; Referee: Michael Kennedy

November 5, 2006 Conference Finals	Houston Dynamo	3–1	Colorado Rapids	Houston, Texas
5:00 PM(CDT)	Dalglish 10', 21'; Clark (yellow card) 17'; Mullan 71'	Report	Kirovski 4' (pen.); Mathis (yellow card) 17'	Stadium: Robertson Stadium; Attendance: 23,107; Referee: Brian Hall

November 12, 2006 MLS Cup	Houston Dynamo	1–1 (a.e.t.) (4–3 p)	New England Revolution	Frisco, Texas
2:30 PM(CDT)	Davis (yellow card) 23'; Cochrane (yellow card) 99'; Waibel (yellow card) 103'; Ching 114'	Report	Franchino (yellow card) 16'; Twellman 113'	Stadium: Pizza Hut Park; Attendance: 22,427; Referee: Jair Marrufo
	Penalties
	Gray (penalty scored); Holden (penalty scored); De Rosario (penalty scored); Davis (penalty missed); Ching (penalty scored)		(penalty scored) Joseph; (penalty scored) Reis; (penalty missed) Noonan; (penalty scored) Twellman; (penalty missed) Heaps

=== US Open Cup ===
August 2, 2006 Fourth Round	Houston Dynamo	4–2	Carolina Dynamo	Houston, Texas
8:00 PM(CDT)	Moreno 29', 33'; Cerritos 58'; Gray (yellow card) 72'; Robinson 82'	Report	Thompson 62'; Roberts (yellow card) 63'; Patterson 71'	Stadium: Robertson Stadium; Attendance: 10,428; Referee: Oscar Ortiz

August 23, 2006 Quarterfinalas	Houston Dynamo	3–0	FC Dallas	Houston, Texas
7:30 PM(CDT)	Robinson 13' (yellow card) 65'; Moreno 57'; Wondolowski 61'	Report	Ruiz (yellow card) 15'; Saragosa (yellow card) 39' (yellow-red card) 74'; Gbandi (yellow card) 90'	Stadium: Carl Lewis Track & Field Stadium; Attendance: 4,000; Referee: Terry Vaughn

September 6, 2006 Semifinals	LA Galaxy	3–1	Houston Dynamo	Carson, California
9:30 PM(CDT)	Gordon 6'; Donovan 44'; Ihemelu (yellow card) 45+1'; Albright (yellow card) 45+2'; Jazić (yellow card) 47'; Quaranta 90+3'	Report	De Rosario 13'; Robinson (yellow card) 53'; Ching (yellow card) 77'	Stadium: Home Depot Center; Attendance: 6,144; Referee: Jair Marrufo

== Player statistics ==
=== Appearances, goals, and assists ===
No.	Pos	Nat	Player	Total			MLS			MLS Playoffs			US Open Cup		
No.	Pos	Nat	Player	Apps	Goals	Assists	Apps	Goals	Assists	Apps	Goals	Assists	Apps	Goals	Assists
1	GK	(United States)	Zach Wells	1	0	0	0	0	0	0	0	0	1	0	0
2	DF	(United States)	Eddie Robinson	32	4	4	25	2	3	4	0	1	3	2	0
3	DF	(United States)	Kevin Goldthwaite	22	0	1	20	0	1	0	0	0	2	0	0
4	DF	(United States)	Chris Aloisi	2	0	0	0	0	0	0	0	0	2	0	0
5	DF	(United States)	Ryan Cochrane	32	1	0	27	1	0	3	0	0	2	0	0
6	DF	(United States)	Kelly Gray	22	0	0	18	0	0	2	0	0	3	0	0
7	MF	(United States)	Chris Wondolowski	9	2	0	6	1	0	0	0	0	3	1	0
8	FW	(Scotland)	Paul Dalglish	10	4	1	6	2	1	4	2	0	0	0	0
9	MF	(United States)	Brian Mullan	37	3	8	31	2	4	4	1	3	2	0	1
11	MF	(United States)	Brad Davis	34	2	14	28	1	11	4	1	2	2	0	1
12	FW	(United States)	Julian Nash	6	0	0	6	0	0	0	0	0	0	0	0
13	MF	(United States)	Ricardo Clark	36	2	4	31	2	3	3	0	1	2	0	0
14	MF	(Canada)	Dwayne De Rosario	37	12	7	30	11	5	4	0	2	3	1	0
15	FW	(Venezuela)	Alejandro Moreno	37	6	7	30	3	6	4	0	1	3	3	0
16	DF	(United States)	Craig Waibel	33	5	2	28	5	1	4	0	1	1	0	0
17	MF	(United States)	Mike Chabala	0	0	0	0	0	0	0	0	0	0	0	0
18	GK	(Canada)	Pat Onstad	38	0	1	32	0	0	4	0	0	2	0	1
19	DF	(United States)	Patrick Ianni	4	0	0	2	0	0	0	0	0	2	0	0
20	FW	(El Salvador)	Ronald Cerritos (Note: Left during the season)	16	1	1	15	0	1	0	0	0	1	1	0
21	DF	(United States)	Aaron Lanes	0	0	0	0	0	0	0	0	0	0	0	0
22	MF	(United States)	Stuart Holden	18	1	2	13	1	0	2	0	0	3	0	2
23	MF	(South Africa)	Mpho Moloi	0	0	0	0	0	0	0	0	0	0	0	0
24	DF	(United States)	Wade Barrett	28	0	3	31	0	3	4	0	0	3	0	0
25	FW	(United States)	Brian Ching	26	14	2	21	11	2	4	3	0	1	0	0
26	FW	(United States)	Marcus Storey	1	0	0	0	0	0	0	0	1	0	0	0
30	GK	(United States)	Martin Hutton	0	0	0	0	0	0	0	0	0	0	0	0
51	MF	(Canada)	Adrian Serioux	27	1	0	20	1	0	4	0	0	3	0	0

Source: Season Statistics and Match reports in Competitions

=== Disciplinary record ===
No.	Pos	Nat	Player	Total		MLS		MLS Playoffs		US Open Cup	
No.	Pos	Nat	Player	Booked	Sent off (straight red)	Booked	Sent off (straight red)	Booked	Sent off (straight red)	Booked	Sent off (straight red)
2	DF	(United States)	Eddie Robinson	13	1	11	1	0	0	2	0
3	DF	(United States)	Kevin Goldthwaite	2	0	2	0	0	0	0	0
5	DF	(United States)	Ryan Cochrane	5	0	4	0	1	0	0	0
6	DF	(United States)	Kelly Gray	3	0	2	0	0	0	1	0
8	FW	(Scotland)	Paul Dalglish	3	0	3	0	0	0	0	0
9	MF	(United States)	Brian Mullan	6	1	6	1	0	0	0	0
11	MF	(United States)	Brad Davis	5	0	4	0	1	0	0	0
13	MF	(United States)	Ricardo Clark	6	1	4	1	2	0	0	0
14	MF	(Canada)	Dwayne De Rosario	3	2	2	2	1	0	0	0
15	FW	(Venezuela)	Alejandro Moreno	2	1	2	1	0	0	0	0
16	DF	(United States)	Craig Waibel	4	0	3	0	1	0	0	0
18	GK	(Canada)	Pat Onstad	3	0	2	0	1	0	0	0
24	DF	(United States)	Wade Barrett	1	1	1	1	0	0	0	0
25	FW	(United States)	Brian Ching	2	0	1	0	0	0	1	0
51	MF	(Canada)	Adrian Serioux	5	0	4	0	1	0	0	0

Source: Season Statistics and Match reports in Competitions

== Honors and awards ==
=== MLS Player of the Week ===
Week	Player	Ref
1	(United States) Brian Ching	
6	(Canada) Dwayne De Rosario	

=== MLS Player of the Month ===
Month	Player	Ref.
April	(United States) Brian Ching	

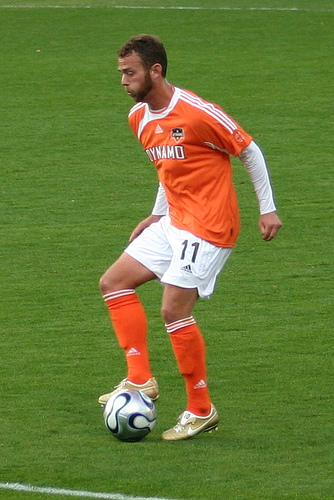
Brad Davis lead the Dynamo in assists during their inaugural season

=== Annual ===
Honor	Player	Ref.
MLS All-Star	(United States) Brian Ching (United States) Ricardo Clark (Canada) Dwayne De Rosario (United States) Eddie Robinson	
MLS Best XI	(United States) Ricardo Clark (Canada) Dwayne De Rosario	
MLS Cup MVP	(United States) Brian Ching	
MLS Goal of the Year	(United States) Brian Ching	
MLS All-Star Game MVP	(Canada) Dwayne De Rosario	

=== Dynamo team awards ===
MVP	Defensive Player of the Year	Humanitarian of the Year	Ref.
(Canada) Dwayne De Rosario	(United States) Eddie Robinson	(United States) Craig Waibel	

== Uniforms ==
Home	Home Alternate	Away	Away Alternate

Type	Shirt	Shorts	Socks	First appearance / Info
Home	Orange	White	Orange	
Home Alt.	Orange	Black	Orange	MLS, April 22 against Salt Lake City
Away	White	Orange	White	
Away Alt.	White	Black	White	MLS, June 24 against Los Angeles
