= 2007 Houston Dynamo season =

Houston Dynamo
2007 season
- Owner: Philip Anschutz (AEG)
- President COO: Oliver Luck; Chris Canetti
- Head coach: Dominic Kinnear
- Stadium: Robertson Stadium
- Major League Soccer: Conference: 2nd Overall: 3rd
- MLS Cup Playoffs: Winners
- U.S. Open Cup: Third Round
- CONCACAF Champions' Cup: Semifinals
- SuperLiga: Semifinals
- Top goalscorer: League: Brian Ching; Joseph Ngwenya 7 goals each All: Brian Ching 12 goals
Home colors	Away colors

The 2007 Houston Dynamo season was the second season of existence for the Houston franchise. The Dynamo were the defending MLS Cup champions from the previous season and prevailed to win back-to-back MLS Cups as they defeated the New England Revolution for the second year in a row in the MLS Cup final. The Dynamo also competed in the CONCACAF Champions' Cup, U.S. Open Cup, and North American SuperLiga during the 2007 season.

== Summary ==
The Dynamo entered 2007 as defending champions, having defeated the New England Revolution in MLS Cup 2006. The result qualified them for the 2007 CONCACAF Champions' Cup, their first continental tournament in franchise history. The Dynamo began their season in the Champions Cup; defeating Puntarenas F.C. in the quarterfinals before losing to C.F. Pachuca in the semifinals. Houston had a disappointing Open Cup, losing in the third round to the Charleston Battery. The Dynamo also competed in the inaugural North American SuperLiga, finishing top of the group before losing to Pachuca 4–3 on penalties in the semifinals.

In MLS play, Houston struggled early in the season, losing 5 of their first 8 matches. The Dynamo then went on an 11 match unbeaten streak, with 8 wins during the streak, helping them climb up to top of the table. Houston had 5 wins, 4 losses, 3 draws over their final 11 games, enough of a dip in form to let D.C. United win the Supporters' Shield by 3 points and Chivas USA claim the top seed in the Western Conference by 1 point.

In the MLS Cup Playoffs, Houston matched up with Texas Derby rivals FC Dallas in the Conference Semifinals. Dallas won the first leg 1–0 thanks to a goal from Clarence Goodson. Houston got off to a poor start, with Carlos Ruiz scoring in the 14th minute to put the Dynamo down 2–0 on aggregate. The game turned in the 47th minute when Arturo Álvarez was shown a red card for violent conduct. Stuart Holden and Brian Ching then scored once each to level the aggregate score and send the game to extratime. In extratime, Ching scored in the 97th and Brad Davis scored in the 100th minute to help Houston advance to the next round. Facing off with the Kansas City Wizards in the Conference Final, the Dynamo rode goals from Nate Jaqua and Dwayne De Rosario to a 2–0 win and a return to MLS Cup. However star striker Brian Ching left the game due to an injury that forced him to miss the final. Houston met the New England Revolution in MLS Cup 2007, a rematch of the 2006 final. Taylor Twellman gave the Revs the lead after scoring in the 20th minute. Houston responded in the second half when Joseph Ngwenya scored the equalizer in the 61st minute. In the 74th minute De Rosario headed in a Brad Davis cross to give the Dynamo a 2–1 lead. Houston held onto the lead, becoming the second team in MLS history to win consecutive MLS Cups.

As of 2024, this is the most recent MLS Cup victory for the Dynamo. The club would advance to two further MLS Cups in 2011 and 2012, losing both to the LA Galaxy. The Dynamo have added two additional trophies in its history with the 2018 and 2023 U.S. Open Cups.

== Final roster ==
As of November 19, 2007

Appearances and goals are totals for MLS regular season only.

No.	Name	Nationality	Position	Date of birth (Age)	Joined from	Joined in	Apps.	Goals
Goalkeepers
1	Zach Wells	(United States)	GK	February 26, 1981 (26)	MetroStars	2006	4	0
18	Pat Onstad	(Canada)	GK	January 13, 1968 (39)	San Jose Earthquakes	2006	59	0
29	Jordan James	(United States)	GK	November 25, 1982 (24)	Cincinnati Kings	2007	0	0
Defenders
2	Eddie Robinson	(United States)	DF	June 19, 1978 (29)	San Jose Earthquakes	2006	50	4
4	Patrick Ianni	(United States)	DF	June 15, 1985 (22)	UCLA	2006	18	1
5	Ryan Cochrane	(United States)	DF	August 8, 1983 (24)	San Jose Earthquakes	2006	52	2
16	Craig Waibel	(United States)	DF	August 21, 1975 (32)	San Jose Earthquakes	2006	49	5
24	Wade Barrett (C)	(United States)	DF	June 23, 1976 (31)	San Jose Earthquakes	2006	61	0
Midfielders
9	Brian Mullan	(United States)	MF	April 23, 1978 (29)	San Jose Earthquakes	2006	59	3
11	Brad Davis	(United States)	MF	November 8, 1981 (26)	San Jose Earthquakes	2006	45	4
13	Ricardo Clark	(United States)	MF	February 10, 1983 (24)	San Jose Earthquakes	2006	50	4
14	Dwayne De Rosario	(Canada)	MF	May 15, 1978 (29)	San Jose Earthquakes	2006	54	17
17	Mike Chabala	(United States)	MF	May 24, 1984 (23)	University of Washington	2006	0	0
19	John Michael Hayden	(United States)	MF	April 27, 1984 (23)	University of Indiana	2007	0	0
20	Eric Ebert	(United States)	MF	August 27, 1984 (23)	University of California	2007	0	0
22	Stuart Holden	(United States)	MF	August 1, 1985 (22)	Sunderland A.F.C.	2006	35	6
26	Corey Ashe	(United States)	MF	March 14, 1986 (21)	University of North Carolina	2007	22	0
27	Erik Ustruck	(United States)	MF	January 4, 1985 (22)	Santa Clara University	2007	0	0
30	Richard Mulrooney	(United States)	MF	November 3, 1976 (31)	Toronto FC	2007	28	0
31	Nick Hatzke	(United States)	MF	October 16, 1983 (24)	University of California	2007	0	0
	Kenneth Hoerner	(United States)	MF	November 16, 1984 (23)	San Jacinto College	2007	0	0
Forwards
7	Chris Wondolowski	(United States)	FW	January 28, 1983 (24)	San Jose Earthquakes	2006	22	2
8	Paul Dalglish	(Scotland)	FW	February 18, 1977 (30)	Hibernian F.C.	2006	11	2
21	Nate Jaqua	(United States)	FW	October 28, 1981 (26)	Los Angeles Galaxy	2007	15	6
25	Brian Ching	(United States)	FW	May 24, 1978 (29)	San Jose Earthquakes	2006	41	18
33	Joseph Ngwenya	(Zimbabwe)	FW	March 30, 1981 (26)	Columbus Crew	2007	25	7

== Player movement ==
=== In ===
Per Major League Soccer and club policies terms of the deals do not get disclosed.

Date	Player	Position	Age	Previous club	Notes	Ref
January 12, 2007	(United States) John Michael Hayden	MF	22	University of Indiana	Selected with the 13th overall pick in the 2007 MLS SuperDraft	
January 12, 2007	(United States) Corey Ashe	MF	20	University of North Carolina	Selected with the 13th pick in the 2nd round (26th overall) of the 2007 MLS SuperDraft	
January 12, 2007	(United States) Mike Sambursky	FW	22	University of South Carolina	Selected with the 13th pick in the 3rd round (39th overall) of the 2007 MLS SuperDraft	
January 12, 2007	(United States) Eric Ebert	MF	22	University of California	Selected with the 13th pick in the 4th round (52nd overall) of the 2007 MLS SuperDraft	
January 18, 2007	(United States) Nick Hatzke	MF	23	University of California	Selected with 13th overall pick in the 2007 MLS Supplemental Draft	
January 18, 2007	(United States) Erik Ustruck	MF	22	Santa Clara University	Selected with 13th in the 3rd round (39th overall) in the 2007 MLS Supplemental Draft	
January 18, 2007	(United States) Justin Douglass	DF	21	Missouri State University	Selected with 3rd in the 4th round (42nd overall) in the 2007 MLS Supplemental Draft	
January 2007	(United States) Jordan James	GK	24	(United States) Cincinnati Kings	Signed on a free transfer	
April 18, 2007	(United States) Richard Mulrooney	MF	30	(Canada) Toronto FC	Acquired in exchange for Kevin Goldthwaite and a 2008 MLS SuperDraft 1st round pick	
May 9, 2007	(Zimbabwe) Joseph Ngwenya	FW	26	(United States) Columbus Crew	Acquired in exchange for Alejandro Moreno	
July 2, 2007	(United States) Nate Jaqua	FW	25	(United States) Los Angeles Galaxy	Acquired in exchange for Kelly Gray and a 2008 MLS SuperDraft 2nd round pick.	
August 31, 2007	(United States) Kenneth Hoerner	MF	22	San Jacinto College	Signed on a free transfer	

=== Out ===
Date	Player	Position	Age	Destination Club	Notes	Ref
November 17, 2006	(Canada) Adrian Serioux	MF	27	(Canada) Toronto FC	Selected by Toronto FC in the 2006 MLS Expansion Draft. A few hours later he was traded again to FC Dallas.	
January 2007	(United States) Chris Aloisi	DF	25	(United States) Rochester Raging Rhinos	Released prior to the 2007 season	
January 2007	(United States) Martin Hutton	GK	24	Retired	Released prior to the 2007 season	
January 2007	(United States) Aaron Lanes	MF	24	Retired	Released prior to the 2007 season	
January 2007	(United States) Marcus Storey	FW	24	(Germany) TuS Heeslingen	Released prior to the 2007 season	
February 27, 2007	(United States) Justin Douglass	DF	21	Retired	Released	
March 2007	(United States) Julian Nash	FW	24	Retired	Released	
April 18, 2007	(United States) Kevin Goldthwaite	DF	24	(Canada) Toronto FC	Traded with a 2008 MLS SuperDraft 1st round pick for Richard Mulrooney	
May 9, 2007	(Venezuela) Alejandro Moreno	FW	27	(United States) Columbus Crew	Traded for Joseph Ngwnya	
July 2, 2007	(United States) Kelly Gray	DF	26	(United States) Los Angeles Galaxy	Traded with a 2008 MLS SuperDraft 2nd round pick for Nate Jaqua	
	(United States) Mike Sambursky	FW	22	Retired	Released	
October 15, 2007	(South Africa) Mpho Moloi	MF	24	(South Africa) Thanda Royal Zulu F.C.	Released	

== Friendlies ==
=== Carolina Challenge Cup ===
March 24, 2007 Carolina Challenge Cup	Toronto FC	0–2	Houston Dynamo	Charleston, South Carolina
6:00 PM (CST)		Report	Cochrane 14'; Wondolowski 73'	Stadium: Blackbaud Stadium; Attendance: 3,183

March 28, 2007 Carolina Challenge Cup	Charleston Battery	1–1	Houston Dynamo	Charleston, South Carolina
8:15 PM (CST)	Sterling 83'	Report	Cochrane 17'	Stadium: Blackbaud Stadium; Attendance: 1,792

March 31, 2007 Carolina Challenge Cup	Houston Dynamo	2–1	New York Red Bulls	Charleston, South Carolina
6:00 PM (CST)	Ching 70'; Moreno 80'	Report	van den Bergh 6'	Stadium: Blackbaud Stadium; Attendance: 2,613

== Competitions ==
=== Major League Soccer ===
==== Standings ====
===== Western Conference =====
Western Conference
Club		Pts	GP	W	L	T	GF	GA	GD
1	Chivas USA	53	30	15	7	8	46	28	+18
2	Houston Dynamo	52	30	15	8	7	43	23	+20
3	FC Dallas	44	30	13	12	5	37	44	–7
4	Colorado Rapids	35	30	9	13	8	29	34	–5
5	Los Angeles Galaxy	34	30	9	14	7	38	48	–10
6	Real Salt Lake	27	30	6	15	9	31	45	–14

2007 MLS Cup Playoffs, 2008 U.S. Open Cup
2007 MLS Cup Playoffs (Wild Card), 2008 U.S. Open Cup

===== Overall =====
Club		Pts	GP	W	L	T	GF	GA	GD
1	D.C. United (E1)	55	30	16	7	7	56	34	+22
2	Chivas USA^{2} (W1)	53	30	15	7	8	46	28	+18
3	Houston Dynamo^{2} (W2)	52	30	15	8	7	43	23	+20
4	New England Revolution^{2} (E2)	50	30	14	8	8	51	43	+8
5	FC Dallas	44	30	13	12	5	37	44	–7
6	New York Red Bulls	43	30	12	11	7	47	45	+2
7	Chicago Fire	40	30	10	10	10	31	36	–5
8	Kansas City Wizards	40	30	11	12	7	45	45	0
9	Columbus Crew	37	30	9	11	10	39	44	–5
10	Colorado Rapids	35	30	9	13	8	29	34	–5
11	Los Angeles Galaxy	34	30	9	14	7	38	48	–10
12	Real Salt Lake	27	30	6	15	9	31	45	–14
13	Toronto FC^{1}	25	30	6	17	7	25	49	–24

MLS Supporters' Shield, 2007 MLS Cup Playoffs, CONCACAF Champions' Cup 2008, SuperLiga 2008, CONCACAF Champions League 2008-09
MLS Supporters' Shield runner-up, 2007 MLS Cup Playoffs, SuperLiga 2008
2007 MLS Cup Playoffs, SuperLiga 2008
2007 MLS Cup Playoffs

- ^Note 1 – Toronto FC cannot qualify for the CONCACAF Champions League through MLS. Rather, they can qualify through the Canadian Championship.
  If they had qualified for the Champions League through MLS, then the highest placed team not already qualified would have qualified.
- ^Note 2 – The winner of the 2007 MLS Supporters' Shield (D.C. United) and the winner of MLS Cup 2007 (Houston Dynamo) qualified for the 2008 CONCACAF Champions' Cup and the 2008–09 CONCACAF Champions League Group Stage. The runner-up of MLS Cup 2007 and the winner of the 2007 U.S. Open Cup (New England Revolution) qualified for the 2008–09 CONCACAF Champions League Preliminary Round. Because New England qualified twice, the additional berth in the preliminary round was awarded to the 2007 MLS Supporters' Shield runner-up (Chivas USA).

==== Matches ====
April 8, 2007 1	Houston Dynamo	0–0	Los Angeles Galaxy	Houston, Texas
6:00 PM(CDT)	Cochrane (red card) 76'	Report	Albright (yellow card) 82'	Stadium: Robertson Stadium; Attendance: 16,404; Referee: Abbey Okulaja

April 14, 2007 2	Houston Dynamo	1–0	Chivas USA	Houston, Texas
7:30 PM(CDT)	Mullan (yellow card) 13'; Robinson (yellow card) 57'; Ching 65'	Report	Razov (yellow card) 30'; Suárez (yellow card) 41'	Stadium: Robertson Stadium; Attendance: 16,519; Referee: Kevin Stott

April 21, 2007 3	New York Red Bulls	1–0	Houston Dynamo	East Rutherford, New Jersey
6:30 PM(CDT)	Mathis (red card) 36'; Parke (yellow card) 48'; Altidore 60'	Report	De Rosario (yellow card) 10'; Robinson (yellow card) 63'	Stadium: Giants Stadium; Attendance: 12,481; Referee: Baldomero Toledo

April 29, 2007 4	Houston Dynamo	0–1	Chicago Fire	Houston, Texas
6:00 PM(CDT)		Report	Segares (yellow card) 21'; Rolfe 60'; Carr (yellow card) 90+1'; Gutiérrez (yellow card) 90+3'	Stadium: Robertson Stadium; Attendance: 13,392; Referee: Tim Weyland

May 5, 2007 5	Colorado Rapids	1–3	Houston Dynamo	Commerce City, Colorado
8:30 PM(CDT)	Beckerman (yellow card) 3'; Brown 5' (yellow card) 67'; Mastroeni (yellow card) 66'; Casey (yellow card) 90+1'	Report	Robinson (yellow card) 45+1'; Ching 55'; De Rosario 63', 68'; Davis (yellow card) 90+1'	Stadium: Dick's Sporting Goods Park; Attendance: 10,719; Referee: Andrew Chapin

May 16, 2007 6	Toronto FC	1–0	Houston Dynamo	Toronto, Ontario
6:00 PM(CDT)	Welsh 25'; Brennan (yellow card) 43'; Eskandarian (yellow card) 54'; Pozniak (yellow card) 86'	Report	Robinson (yellow card) 76'	Stadium: BMO Field; Attendance: 19,123; Referee: Terry Vaughn

May 19, 2007 7	Houston Dynamo	0–1	New England Revolution	Houston, Texas
7:30 PM(CDT)	Ching (yellow card) 43'; De Rosario (yellow card) 45+3'; Holden (yellow card) 71'; Cochrane (yellow card) 77'	Report	Joseph 9'; Smith (yellow card) 29'; Heaps (yellow card) 82'	Stadium: Robertson Stadium; Attendance: 18,232; Referee: Ricardo Salazar

May 26, 2007 8	D.C. United	2–1	Houston Dynamo	Washington, D.C.
6:30 PM(CDT)	Gómez 4'; Olsen 27' (yellow card) 90+3'; Kpene (yellow card) 45+2'; Gros (yellow card) 72'; Dyachenko (yellow card) 90+2'	Report	Cochrane (yellow card) 39'; De Rosario (yellow card) 65' (goal) 73'	Stadium: Robert F. Kennedy Memorial Stadium; Attendance: 18,078; Referee: Jair Marrufo

June 3, 2007 9	Houston Dynamo	2–1	FC Dallas	Houston, Texas
4:00 PM(CDT)	Clark 51'; Ngwenya 66'; Onstad (red card) 78'	Report	Ricchetti (yellow card) 29'; Thompson 32'; Rhine (yellow card) 35'; Wagenfuhr (yellow card) 43'	Stadium: Robertson Stadium; Attendance: 13,199; Referee: Michael Kennedy

June 7, 2007 10	Houston Dynamo	2–1	Colorado Rapids	Houston, Texas
8:00 PM(CDT)	Ngwenya 3'; Holden 63'; Cochrane (yellow card) 82'	Report	Cancela 12'; Beckerman (yellow card) 35'; Wingert (yellow card) 61'	Stadium: Robertson Stadium; Attendance: 12,017; Referee: Abbey Okulaja

June 10, 2007 11	Columbus Crew	1–2	Houston Dynamo	Columbus, Ohio
4:00 PM(CDT)	Moreno 25'; Barros Schelotto 27'	Report	Ngwenya 22' (yellow card) 43'; Marshall 69' (o.g.)	Stadium: Mapfre Stadium; Attendance: 12,661; Referee: Kevin Stott

June 21, 2007 12	Houston Dynamo	4–0	Chivas USA	Houston, Texas
8:00 PM(CDT)	Mullan 5'; Davis 55' 70' 75'; Robinson (yellow card) 60'	Report	Nagamura (yellow card) 22'; Thomas (red card) 66'	Stadium: Robertson Stadium; Attendance: 14,184; Referee: Jorge Gonzalez

June 24, 2007 13	Kansas City Wizards	0–1	Houston Dynamo	Kansas City, Missouri
4:00 PM(CDT)	Garcia (yellow card) 58'	Report	Ianni (yellow card) 31' (goal) 81'	Stadium: Arrowhead Stadium; Attendance: 8,091; Referee: Jozef Batko

June 30, 2007 14	FC Dallas	0–0	Houston Dynamo	Frisco, Texas
5:00 PM(CDT)	Saragosa (yellow card) 21'; Pitchkolan (yellow card) 37'	Report	Barrett (yellow card) 23'; Robinson (yellow card) 29'	Stadium: Pizza Hut Park; Attendance: 13,887; Referee: Brian Hall

July 5, 2007 15	Houston Dynamo	4–0	New York Red Bulls	Houston, Texas
7:00 PM(CDT)	Ngwenya 28' 50'; Ching 32'; Holden 81'	Report	Goldthwaite (yellow card) 27'	Stadium: Robertson Stadium; Attendance: 14,072; Referee: Tim Weyland

July 8, 2007 16	Houston Dynamo	1–0	D.C. United	Houston, Texas
7:30 PM(CDT)	Ching 33'; De Rosario (yellow card) 52'	Report	Gómez (yellow card) 90'	Stadium: Robertson Stadium; Attendance: 15,033; Referee: Brian Hall

July 12, 2007 17	Chicago Fire	0–4	Houston Dynamo	Bridgeview, Illinois
8:00 PM(CDT)	Gutierrez (yellow card) 70'; Thiago (yellow card) 80'	Report	Holden 31' (yellow card) 76'; Jaqua 58'; Ngwenya 62'; Wondolowski 90+1'	Stadium: Toyota Park; Attendance: 20,034; Referee: Alex Prus

July 15, 2007 18	Houston Dynamo	0–0	Toronto FC	Houston, Texas
7:30 PM(CDT)	Robinson (yellow card) 66'	Report	Edu (red card) 42'; Robinson (yellow card) 53'	Stadium: Robertson Stadium; Attendance: 11,114; Referee: Abbey Okulaja

July 22, 2007 19	New England Revolution	3–3	Houston Dynamo	Foxborough, Massachusetts
3:00 PM(CDT)	Noonan 32'; Twellman 51'; Joseph 66'	Report	De Rosario 49' (yellow card) 53'; Ching 60' 61'; Ngwenya (yellow card) 65'; Robinson (yellow card) 86'	Stadium: Gillette Stadium; Attendance: 14,606; Referee: Kevin Stott

August 4, 2007 20	Real Salt Lake	1–0	Houston Dynamo	Salt Lake City, Utah
8:00 PM(CDT)	Findley 84'; Kotschau (yellow card) 87'; Beckerman (yellow card) 88'; Wingert (yellow card) 89'	Report		Stadium: Rice–Eccles Stadium; Attendance: 13,003; Referee: Jozef Batko

August 11, 2007 21	Colorado Rapids	1–0	Houston Dynamo	Commerce City, Colorado
8:00 PM(CDT)	Gomez (yellow card) 4'; De Rosario 61' (o.g.); Petke (yellow card) 71'; Ihemelu (red card) 77'; Prideaux (yellow card) 81'	Report	Cochrane (yellow card) 44'; Ngwenya (yellow card) 71'; Waibel (yellow card) 80'	Stadium: Dick's Sporting Goods Park; Attendance: 18,024; Referee: Terry Vaughn

August 19, 2007 22	Houston Dynamo	1–0	FC Dallas	Houston, Texas
6:00 PM(CDT)	Robinson (yellow card) 34'; Ching 42'; Jaqua (yellow card) 84'	Report	Rhine (yellow card) 31'; Oduro (yellow card) 77'	Stadium: Robertson Stadium; Attendance: 19,501; Referee: Tim Weyland

August 25, 2007 23	Houston Dynamo	1–1	Columbus Crew	Houston, Texas
7:30 PM(CDT)	Jaqua (yellow card) 26' (goal) 80'; Mullan (yellow card) 84'	Report	González (yellow card) 33' (yellow-red card) 38'; Moreno 17'; Barros Schelotto (yellow card) 73'; Miglioranzi (yellow card) 90'	Stadium: Robertson Stadium; Attendance: 14,351; Referee: Abbey Okulaja

September 1, 2007 24	Houston Dynamo	1–1	Kansas City Wizards	Houston, Texas
7:30 PM(CDT)	Ngwenya (yellow card) 27' (goal) 69'; Mulrooney (yellow card) 32'; Ianni (yellow card) 51'; De Rosario (yellow card) 61'	Report	Conrad (yellow card) 29'; Johnson 45+1' (yellow card) 47'; Morsink (yellow card) 47'	Stadium: Robertson Stadium; Attendance: 13,530; Referee: Ramon Hernandez

September 8, 2007 25	Houston Dynamo	4–3	Real Salt Lake	Houston, Texas
7:30 PM(CDT)	Jaqua 6' 48' 57'; Robinson 28'; Ashe (yellow card) 39'; Clark (yellow card) 79'	Report	Morales (yellow card) 7'; Espíndola 18' (yellow card) 51'; Mantilla (yellow card) 33'; Talley 69'; Brown 72'	Stadium: Robertson Stadium; Attendance: 16,104; Referee: Jair Marrufo

September 16, 2007 26	Los Angeles Galaxy	1–3	Houston Dynamo	Carson, California
7:00 PM(CDT)	Gordon 26'; Randolph (yellow card) 34'; Vagenas (yellow card) 76'	Report	Cochrane 21' (yellow card) 45+2'; Robinson (yellow card) 44'; Mullan (yellow card) 45+3'	Stadium: Home Depot Center; Attendance: 25,217; Referee: Brian Hall

September 30, 2007 27	FC Dallas	0–3	Houston Dynamo	Frisco, Texas
2:00 PM(CDT)	Ruiz (yellow card) 17' (red card) 89'	Report	Ashe (yellow card) 5'; De Rosario 45+1'; Robinson 62' (yellow card) 87'; Clark (yellow card) 81' (red card) 89'; Holden 84'	Stadium: Pizza Hut Park; Attendance: 17,366; Referee: Jorge Gonzalez

October 7, 2007 28	Houston Dynamo	1–2	Los Angeles Galaxy	Houston, Texas
2:00 PM(CDT)	Jaqua 21' (yellow card) 59'	Report	Pavón 45+1'; Glinton 77'; Tudela (yellow card) 84'; Cannon (yellow card) 90+1'	Stadium: Robertson Stadium; Attendance: 30,588; Referee: Abbey Okulaja

October 15, 2007 29	Real Salt Lake	0–1	Houston Dynamo	Salt Lake City, Utah
8:00 PM(CDT)	Williams (yellow card) 42'; Movsisyan (yellow card) 42' (red card) 77'	Report	Cochrane (yellow card) 43'; Holden 66'; Robinson (red card) 73'	Stadium: Rice–Eccles Stadium; Attendance: 14,587; Referee: Tim Weyland

October 20, 2007 30	Chivas USA	0–0	Houston Dynamo	Carson, California
9:30 PM(CDT)	Vaughn (red card) 40'	Report	Barrett (yellow card) 45+1'; Ianni (yellow card) 68'; Mulrooney (yellow card) 82'; Mullan (yellow card) 90'	Stadium: Home Depot Center; Attendance: 16,853; Referee: Baldomero Toledo

=== MLS Cup Playoffs ===
October 27, 2007 Conference Semifinals Leg 1	FC Dallas	1–0	Houston Dynamo	Frisco, Texas
7:00 PM(CDT)	Ruíz (yellow card) 19'; Goodson 23'; Ricchetti (yellow card) 58'; Oduro (yellow card) 79'	Report	Cochrane (yellow card) 26'	Stadium: Pizza Hut Park; Attendance: 12,537; Referee: Kevin Stott

November 2, 2007 Conference Semifinals Leg 2	Houston Dynamo	4–1 (a.e.t.) (4–2 agg.)	FC Dallas	Houston, Texas
7:30 PM(CDT)	Mulrooney (yellow card) 28'; Robinson (yellow card) 40'; Holden 67'; Ching 72', 97'; Onstad (yellow card) 98'; Davis 100'; De Rosario (yellow card) 109'	Report	Ruíz 14'; Sala (yellow card) 24'; Denílson (yellow card) 39'; C Gbandi (yellow card) 44'; Alvarez (red card) 47'; Serioux (yellow card) 78'; Moor (yellow card) 99' (yellow-red card) 119'; Ricchetti (yellow card) 120'	Stadium: Robertson Stadium; Attendance: 30,088; Referee: Baldomero Toledo

November 10, 2007 Conference Finals	Houston Dynamo	2–0	Kansas City Wizards	Houston, Texas
7:30 PM(CST)	Jaqua 35' (yellow card) 41'; De Rosario 81'	Report	Garcia (yellow card) 55'; Marinelli (yellow card) 58'; Arnaud (yellow card) 90+3'	Stadium: Robertson Stadium; Attendance: 30,972; Referee: Jair Marrufo

November 18, 2007 MLS Cup	New England Revolution	1–2	Houston Dynamo	Washington, D.C.
11:00 AM(CST)	Twellman 20'; Smith (yellow card) 65'	Report	Barrett (yellow card) 57'; Ngwenya 61'; De Rosario 74'	Stadium: Robert F. Kennedy Memorial Stadium; Attendance: 39,859; Referee: Alex Prus

=== US Open Cup ===
July 10, 2007 Third Round	Charleston Battery (North Carolina)	1–0	(Texas) Houston Dynamo	Charleston, South Carolina
6:30 PM(CDT)	Armstrong (yellow card) 33' (goal) 108'; Chin (yellow card) 88'	Report	Ustruck (yellow card) 69'; Dalglish (yellow card) 108'	Stadium: Blackbaud Stadium; Attendance: 2,569; Referee: Shane Moody

=== CONCACAF Champions' Cup ===
==== Quarterfinals ====
February 21, 2007 First leg	Puntarenas F.C. (Costa Rica)	1–0	(United States) Houston Dynamo	Puntarenas, Costa Rica
3:00 PM(CST)	Bernard 90+2'	Report	Robinson (yellow card) 6' (yellow-red card) 71'; Waibel (yellow card) 26'; Barrett (yellow card) 85'	Stadium: Estadio Lito Pérez; Attendance: 5,721; Referee: German Arredondo

March 1, 2007 Second leg	Houston Dynamo (United States)	2–0 (2–1 agg.)	(Costa Rica) Puntarenas F.C.	College Station, Texas
9:00 PM(CST)	De Rosario (yellow card) 18'; Dalglish 26' (yellow card) 82'; Gray 74'; Mullan (yellow card) 77'; Wondolowski (yellow card) 89'	Report	Camacho (yellow card) 26'; Rocella (yellow card) 90'	Stadium: Aggie Soccer Stadium; Attendance: 4,286; Referee: Benito Archundia

==== Semifinals ====
March 15, 2007 First leg	Houston Dynamo (United States)	2–0	(Mexico) Pachuca	Houston, Texas
5:00 PM(CDT)	Ching 57'; Davis (yellow card) 68'; Wondolowski 84'	Report	Salazar (yellow card) 45'; Mosquera (yellow card) 53'; Christian Giménez (yellow card) 78'	Stadium: Robertson Stadium; Attendance: 13,007; Referee: Neal Brizan

April 5, 2007 Second leg	Pachuca (Mexico)	5–2 (a.e.t.) (5–4 agg.)	(United States) Houston Dynamo	Hidalgo, Mexico
9:00 PM(CDT)	Caballero 4', 86' (yellow card) 50'; Cacho (yellow card) 54'; Giménez 15' (pen), 58' (pen), 105'	Report	Wells (yellow card) 35'; Mullan 53'; Robinson (yellow card) 57'; Ching 79'; Gray (yellow card) 90'; Goldthwaite (yellow card) 101'; Dalglish (yellow card) 108'	Stadium: Estadio Hidalgo; Attendance: 30,000; Referee: Mauricio Navarro

=== SuperLiga ===
Team	Pld	W	D	L	GF	GA	GD	Pts
(United States) Houston Dynamo	3	2	1	0	3	1	+2	7
(United States) D.C. United	3	1	1	1	2	2	0	4
(Mexico) Club América	3	1	0	2	3	4	−1	3
(Mexico) Monarcas Morelia	3	0	2	1	4	5	−1	2

July 25, 2007 Group stage	Houston Dynamo (United States)	1–0	(Mexico) Club América	Houston, Texas
9:00 PM(CDT)	Jaqua 41'; Robinson (yellow card) 45+1'; Mullan (yellow card) 55'	Report	Villa (yellow card) 45+3'; Argüello (yellow card) 61'; Cabañas (yellow card) 80'; Davino (yellow card) 90+1'	Stadium: Robertson Stadium; Attendance: 18,112; Referee: Samir Osman

July 29, 2007 Group stage	Houston Dynamo (United States)	1–1	(Mexico) Monarcas Morelia	Houston, Texas
9:00 PM(CDT)	Ngwenya 1'; De Rosario (yellow card) 49'; Mullan (yellow card) 78'	Report	Acre (yellow card) 48'; Cervantes (yellow card) 66'; Batista 74'; Martínez (yellow card) 79'	Stadium: Robertson Stadium; Attendance: 11,236; Referee: Walter Quesada

August 1, 2007 Group stage	Houston Dynamo (United States)	1–0	(United States) D.C. United	Houston, Texas
7:00 PM(CDT)	Ching 50'; Mulrooney (yellow card) 90+2'	Report	Burch (yellow card) 61'; Kpene (yellow card) 86'	Stadium: Robertson Stadium; Attendance: 11,013; Referee: Baldomero Toledo

August 14, 2007 Semifinals	Houston Dynamo (United States)	2–2 (3–4 p)	(Mexico) Pachuca	Houston, Texas
9:00 PM(CDT)	De Rosario 4'; Ianni (red card) 13'; Jaqua (yellow card) 69'; Robinson 83' (yellow card) 90+3'; Mullan (yellow card) 83'; Ashe (red card) 102'; Ngwenya (yellow card) 114'	Report	Giménez (yellow card) 6'; Álvarez (yellow card) 7'; Cacho 28'; Chitiva 61' (yellow card) 82' (yellow-red card) 85'; Correa (yellow card) 102'	Stadium: Robertson Stadium; Attendance: 21,712; Referee: Ricardo Salazar
	Penalties
	Barrett (penalty scored); Wondolowski (penalty scored); Mulrooney (penalty scored); Ching (penalty missed); Ngwenya (penalty missed)		(penalty scored) Salazar; (penalty scored) Caballero; (penalty scored) Rey; (penalty missed) Álvarez; (penalty scored) Lugo

== Player statistics ==
=== Appearances, goals, and assists ===
No.	Pos.	Nat.	Player	Total			MLS			Playoffs			U.S. Open Cup			Champions Cup			SuperLiga		
No.	Pos.	Nat.	Player	Apps	G	A	Apps	G	A	Apps	G	A	Apps	G	A	Apps	G	A	Apps	G	A
1	GK	(United States)	Zach Wells	11	0	0	4	0	0	0	0	0	1	0	0	4	0	0	2	0	0
2	DF	(United States)	Eddie Robinson	37	3	2	25	2	2	4	0	0	1	0	0	3	0	0	4	1	0
3	DF	(United States)	Kevin Goldthwaite (Note: Left during the season)	3	0	0	1	0	0	0	0	0	0	0	0	2	0	0	0	0	0
4	DF	(United States)	Patrick Ianni	20	1	0	16	1	0	0	0	0	1	0	0	0	0	0	3	0	0
5	DF	(United States)	Ryan Cochrane	35	1	1	25	1	0	4	0	1	1	0	0	3	0	0	2	0	0
6	DF	(United States)	Kelly Gray	13	1	1	9	0	1	0	0	0	0	0	0	4	1	0	0	0	0
7	FW	(United States)	Chris Wondolowski	22	2	1	16	1	1	0	0	0	1	0	0	3	1	0	2	0	0
8	FW	(Scotland)	Paul Dalglish	10	1	0	5	0	0	0	0	0	1	0	0	4	1	0	0	0	0
9	MF	(United States)	Brian Mullan	40	2	4	28	1	3	4	0	0	1	0	0	4	1	0	3	0	1
11	MF	(United States)	Brad Davis	25	4	5	17	3	3	4	1	1	0	0	0	4	0	1	0	0	0
13	MF	(United States)	Ricardo Clark	23	2	3	19	2	3	0	0	0	0	0	0	3	0	0	1	0	0
14	MF	(Canada)	Dwayne De Rosario	36	9	8	24	6	4	4	2	2	0	0	0	4	0	2	4	1	0
15	FW	(Venezuela)	Alejandro Moreno	8	0	0	4	0	0	0	0	0	0	0	0	4	0	0	0	0	0
16	DF	(United States)	Craig Waibel	33	0	5	21	0	2	4	0	2	0	0	0	4	0	1	4	0	0
17	MF	(United States)	Mike Chabala	1	0	0	0	0	0	0	0	0	1	0	0	0	0	0	0	0	0
18	GK	(Canada)	Pat Onstad	34	0	0	27	0	0	4	0	0	0	0	0	1	0	0	2	0	0
19	MF	(United States)	John Michael Hayden	1	0	0	0	0	0	0	0	0	1	0	0	0	0	0	0	0	0
20	MF	(United States)	Eric Ebert	0	0	0	0	0	0	0	0	0	0	0	0	0	0	0	0	0	0
21	FW	(United States)	Nate Jaqua	24	8	3	15	6	2	4	1	0	1	0	0	0	0	0	4	1	1
22	MF	(United States)	Stuart Holden	31	6	7	22	5	5	4	1	0	1	0	0	1	0	1	3	0	1
23	MF	(South Africa)	Mpho Moloi	1	0	0	0	0	0	0	0	0	1	0	0	0	0	0	0	0	0
24	DF	(United States)	Wade Barrett	42	0	2	30	0	2	4	0	0	0	0	0	4	0	0	4	0	0
25	FW	(United States)	Brian Ching	30	12	5	20	7	2	3	2	1	0	0	0	3	2	1	4	1	1
26	MF	(United States)	Corey Ashe	26	0	4	22	0	4	0	0	0	1	0	0	0	0	0	3	0	0
27	MF	(United States)	Erik Ustruck	1	0	0	0	0	0	0	0	0	1	0	0	0	0	0	0	0	0
29	GK	(United States)	Jordan James	0	0	0	0	0	0	0	0	0	0	0	0	0	0	0	0	0	0
30	MF	(United States)	Richard Mulrooney	36	0	7	28	0	5	4	0	1	0	0	0	0	0	0	4	0	1
31	MF	(United States)	Nick Hatzke	1	0	0	0	0	0	0	0	0	1	0	0	0	0	0	0	0	0
33	FW	(Zimbabwe)	Joseph Ngwenya	33	9	5	25	7	3	4	1	2	0	0	0	0	0	0	4	1	0

Source: Season Statistics and match reports in Competitions

=== Disciplinary record ===
No.	Pos.	Nat.	Player	Total		MLS		Playoffs		U.S. Open Cup		Champions Cup		SuperLiga	
No.	Pos.	Nat.	Player	Booked	Sent off (straight red)	Booked	Sent off (straight red)	Booked	Sent off (straight red)	Booked	Sent off (straight red)	Booked	Sent off (straight red)	Booked	Sent off (straight red)
1	GK	(United States)	Zach Wells	1	0	0	0	0	0	0	0	1	0	0	0
2	DF	(United States)	Eddie Robinson	16	2	11	1	1	0	0	0	2	1	0	0
3	DF	(United States)	Kevin Goldthwaite (Note: Left during the season)	1	0	0	0	0	0	0	0	1	0	0	0
4	DF	(United States)	Patrick Ianni	3	1	3	0	0	0	0	0	0	0	0	1
5	DF	(United States)	Ryan Cochrane	7	1	6	1	1	0	0	0	0	0	0	0
6	DF	(United States)	Kelly Gray	1	0	0	0	0	0	0	0	1	0	0	0
7	FW	(United States)	Chris Wondolowski	1	0	0	0	0	0	0	0	1	0	0	0
8	FW	(Scotland)	Paul Dalglish	3	0	0	0	0	0	1	0	2	0	0	0
9	MF	(United States)	Brian Mullan	8	0	4	0	0	0	0	0	1	0	3	0
11	MF	(United States)	Brad Davis	2	0	1	0	0	0	0	0	1	0	0	0
13	MF	(United States)	Ricardo Clark	2	1	2	1	0	0	0	0	0	0	0	0
14	MF	(Canada)	Dwayne De Rosario	8	0	5	0	1	0	0	0	1	0	1	0
15	FW	(Venezuela)	Alejandro Moreno	1	0	0	0	0	0	0	0	1	0	0	0
16	DF	(United States)	Craig Waibel	2	0	1	0	0	0	0	0	1	0	0	0
21	FW	(United States)	Nate Jaqua	5	0	3	0	1	0	0	0	0	0	1	0
22	MF	(United States)	Stuart Holden	2	0	2	0	0	0	0	0	0	0	0	0
24	DF	(United States)	Wade Barrett	4	0	2	0	1	0	0	0	1	0	0	0
25	FW	(United States)	Brian Ching	1	0	0	0	1	0	0	0	0	0	0	0
26	MF	(United States)	Corey Ashe	2	1	2	0	0	0	0	0	0	0	0	1
27	MF	(United States)	Erik Ustruck	1	0	0	0	0	0	1	0	0	0	0	0
30	MF	(United States)	Richard Mulrooney	3	0	2	0	1	0	0	0	0	0	0	0
33	FW	(Zimbabwe)	Joseph Ngwenya	5	0	4	0	0	0	0	0	0	0	1	0

Source: Season Statistics and match reports in Competitions

=== Clean sheets ===
Rank	Nat.	Player	MLS	Playoffs	U.S. Open Cup	Champions Cup	SuperLiga	Total
1	(Canada)	Pat Onstad	11	1	0	0	1	14
2	(United States)	Zach Wells	2	0	0	2	1	5
Total			13	1	0	2	2	19

Source: Season Statistics and match reports in Competitions

== Honors and awards ==
=== MLS Player of the Week ===
Week	Player	Ref.
5	(Canada) Dwayne De Rosario	
12	(United States) Brad Davis	
14	(United States) Stuart Holden	

=== MLS Goal of the Week ===
Week	Player	Opponent	Date
12	(United States) Brad Davis	Chivas USA	June 21
14	(United States) Stuart Holden	New York Red Bulls	July 5
15	(Zimbabwe) Joseph Ngwenya	Chicago Fire	July 12
16	(Canada) Dwayne De Rosario	New England Revolution	July 22

=== Annual ===
Honor	Player	Ref.
MLS All-Star	(United States) Brian Ching (United States) Ricardo Clark (Canada) Dwayne De Rosario	
MLS Best XI	(Canada) Dwayne De Rosario (United States) Eddie Robinson	
MLS Cup MVP	(Canada) Dwayne De Rosario	

=== Dynamo team awards ===
MVP	Defensive Player of the Year	Humanitarian of the Year	Ref.
(United States) Brian Mullan (Canada) Pat Onstad	(United States) Eddie Robinson	(United States) Craig Waibel	

== Uniforms ==
Home	Away	Special

Type	Shirt	Shorts	Socks	First appearance / Info
Home	Orange	White	Orange	
Away	White	Orange	White	
Special	Maroon	White	Orange	MLS, April 29 against Chicago → Virginia Tech Memorial Kit
