= MLS Cup 2006 =

2006 edition of the MLS Cup

- Event: MLS Cup
New England Revolution	Houston Dynamo
1	1
- After extra time Houston Dynamo won 4–3 on penalties
- Date: November 12, 2006
- Venue: Pizza Hut Park, Frisco, Texas, US
- MLS Cup MVP: Brian Ching (Houston Dynamo)
- Referee: Jair Marrufo
- Attendance: 22,427
- Weather: Sunny, 61 °F (16 °C)

MLS Cup 2006 was the 11th edition of the MLS Cup, the championship match of Major League Soccer (MLS), and took place on November 12, 2006. It was contested between the New England Revolution and the Houston Dynamo to decide the champion of the 2006 season. The match was played at Pizza Hut Park in Frisco, Texas, which had hosted the previous cup.

Both teams qualified for the playoffs by placing second in their respective conference during the regular season. New England were appearing in their second consecutive final, while Houston had been formed from the relocated San Jose Earthquakes. The match was tied 1–1 on goals scored 71 seconds apart by Taylor Twellman and Brian Ching in extra time. Houston won 4–3 in the first penalty shootout in MLS Cup history, with Ching scoring the winning penalty kick and Pat Onstad saving the follow-up in the fifth round. Houston and New England would stage a rematch in the following cup, which the Dynamo won in Washington, D.C.

== Venue ==
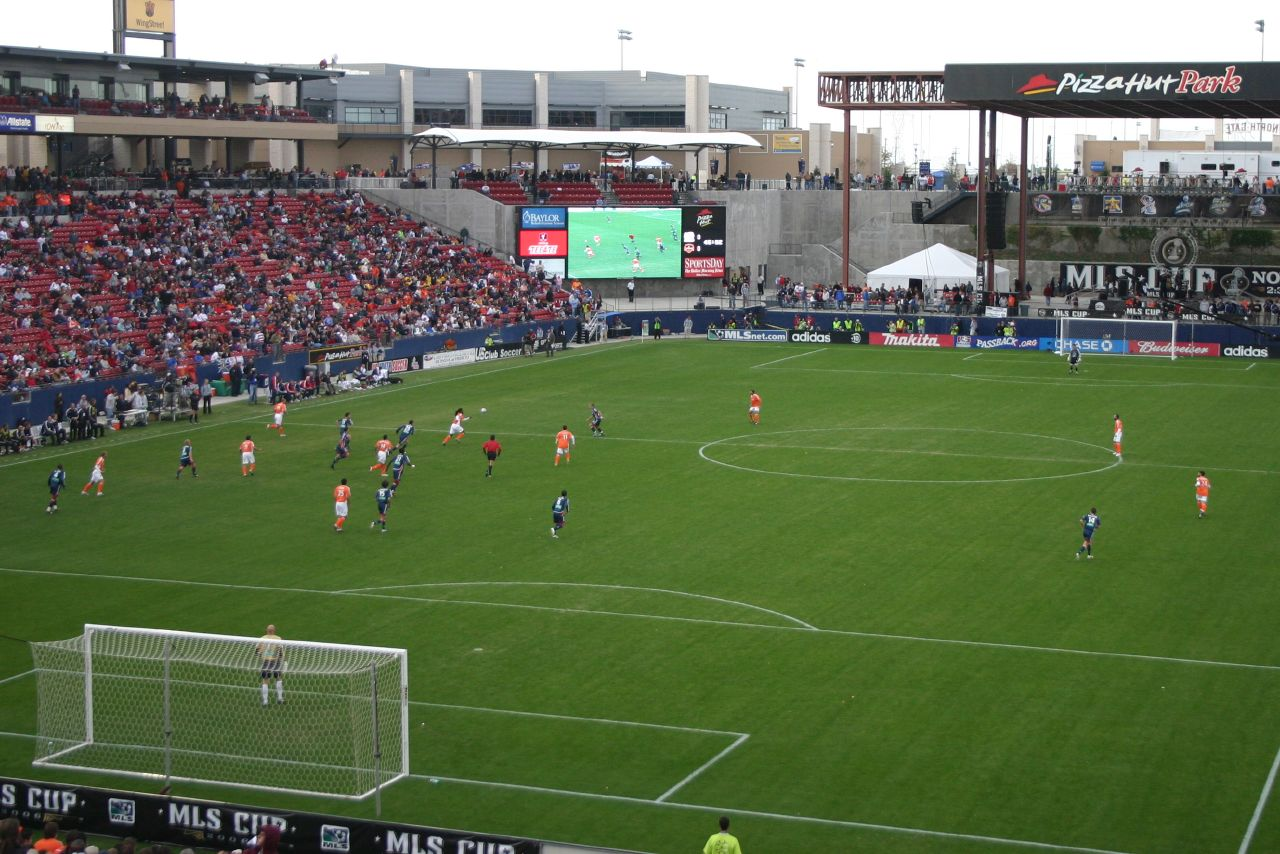
Pizza Hut Park in Frisco, Texas, host venue of MLS Cup 2006

The match was hosted at Pizza Hut Park in Frisco, Texas, the venue of the previous final between the New England Revolution and Los Angeles Galaxy. The $80 million stadium was opened on August 6, 2005, and serves primarily as the home of FC Dallas. On January 31, 2006, MLS announced that Pizza Hut Park would repeat as the venue for a second consecutive MLS Cup, following a successful bid from FC Dallas; the other bidding finalist was the Home Depot Center in Carson, California, home to the Los Angeles Galaxy. The Home Depot Center was also the only other venue to previously host consecutive MLS Cups, having done so in 2003 and 2004. Pizza Hut Park was considered as a model for Houston's proposed stadium, along with other soccer-specific stadiums built by the league in the 2000s. During the run-up to the match, the MLS Cup trophy toured the Dallas–Fort Worth metroplex to promote the league and FC Dallas.

== Road to the final ==
The MLS Cup is the post-season championship of Major League Soccer (MLS), a professional club soccer league based in the United States. The 2006 season was the eleventh in the league's history and was contested by twelve teams in two conferences, divided into the east and west. Each team played a total of 32 matches in the regular season from April to October, facing teams within their conference four times, and teams outside of their conference two times. The playoffs ran from mid-October to November and was contested by the top four teams in each conference. It was organized into three rounds: a home-and-away series with a winner determined by aggregate score in the Conference Semifinals, a single-match Conference Final, and the MLS Cup final.

MLS Cup 2006 was contested by the New England Revolution and the Houston Dynamo, who had both finished second in their respective conferences during the regular season. The two teams finished within two points of each other in regular season standings and had identical home win–loss–draw records. The 2006 final also marked the first time that neither MLS Cup finalist had won their conference or division, as well as the first time that both finalists had qualified despite losing their first playoffs match. New England and Houston played each other twice during the regular season, trading 1–1 draws in May and July.

=== New England Revolution ===
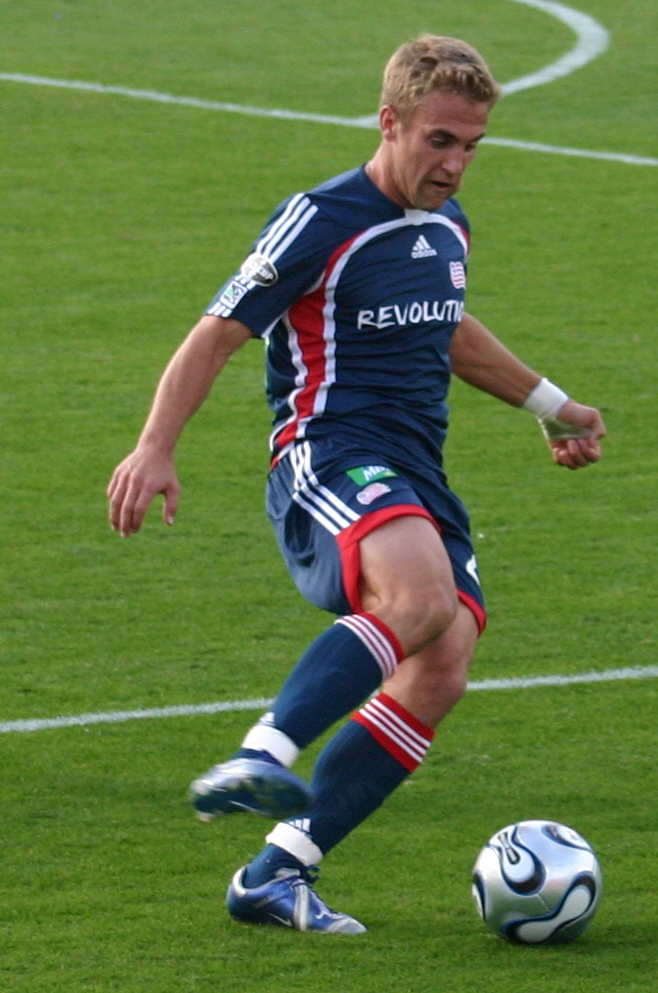
New England Revolution forward Taylor Twellman, who scored two goals in the team's playoff run

The New England Revolution finished as MLS Cup runners-up in 2002 and 2005, losing both championships to the Los Angeles Galaxy in overtime. The Revolution had also qualified for four straight Eastern Conference Finals, losing in 2003 to the Chicago Fire and in 2004 to D.C. United in a penalty shootout in between their MLS Cup appearances. The team finished second overall in league standings at the end of the 2005 regular season, setting new team records for wins and points after going on an eleven-match unbeaten streak. The Revolution were in their sixth season under manager Steve Nicol, who primarily used a 3–5–2 formation, and kept their starting lineup from the previous season. The team added forwards Kyle Brown and Willie Sims in the offseason to provide additional depth.

The Revolution opened their season with only three wins in their first thirteen matches, including a run of five draws in six matches during a winless streak from May to June. The team's struggles were blamed, in part, on injuries and Clint Dempsey's call-up to play in the World Cup that required manager Steve Nicol to use different starting lineups to rotate players. The return of Dempsey and other injured players helped the team to earn three more wins by early July, which helped New England rise from fourth to second in the Eastern Conference standings behind D.C. United.

Despite a six-match winless run in July and August, blamed on long road trips in the schedule, the Revolution remained in second place but fell further behind D.C. in the conference standings. New England finished the season with several home matches on a seven-match unbeaten streak, including five wins, which mirrored the end of the previous season. The team finished the regular season with 48 points, their second-highest record, and clinched the second seed in the Eastern Conference. Dempsey was named to the MLS Best XI, while Matt Reis and Steve Ralston finished as finalists for other league awards.

New England was matched against the third-place Chicago Fire in the Eastern Conference Finals, losing 1–0 in the first leg away from home and conceding an early goal in the second leg to create a 0–2 defect on aggregate. The Revolution rallied in the second leg with goals by Taylor Twellman and Pat Noonan to tie 2–2 on aggregate and force a penalty shootout against the Fire, despite missing midfielders Dempsey and Shalrie Joseph. New England won the shootout 4–2 in four rounds, with two saves by goalkeeper Matt Reis (who also scored) to clinch a fifth consecutive appearance in the Eastern Conference Final. The Revolution mirrored their performance in the 2005 Eastern Conference Final against league winners D.C. United by winning 1–0 on a volleyed goal scored in the fourth minute by Twellman. The win clinched an MLS Cup appearance for New England for the third time in five years.

=== Houston Dynamo ===
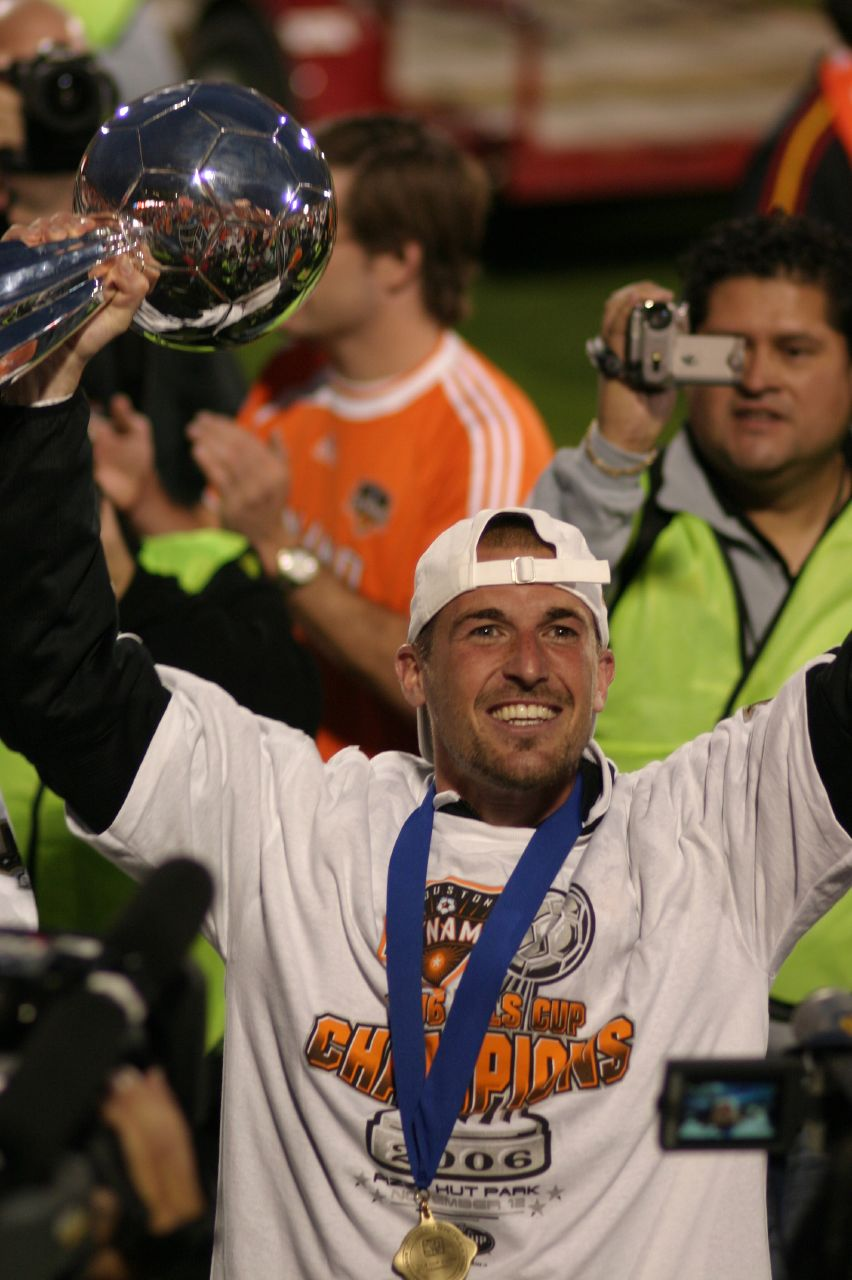
Paul Dalglish, who scored two goals in the Western Conference Final, holding the MLS Cup trophy

The Houston Dynamo were formed after owners Anschutz Entertainment Group announced that the San Jose Earthquakes would relocate to Houston for the 2006 season, citing a failure to secure a stadium and local ownership group in the Bay Area. The Earthquakes had won the MLS Cup in 2001 and 2003 and finished the 2005 season as Supporters' Shield winners before being eliminated by the Los Angeles Galaxy in the first round of the playoffs. The team's players, head coach Dominic Kinnear, and technical staff were transferred to Houston, while the Earthquakes name was retained by the league for an expansion team that was announced in 2007.

The team was renamed from Houston 1836 to the Dynamo prior to starting the season after objections from the area's Hispanic communities over its reference to the year 1836, which marked both the city's founding and Texas's independence from Mexico. The Dynamo lost only three of their first eighteen matches, including a ten-match unbeaten streak that lasted from May to late July, and only trailed in-state rivals FC Dallas in the Western Conference standings. Prior to the unbeaten run, Houston were without starting forward Brian Ching, who was called up to the U.S. national team at the World Cup and missed six league matches. He later missed five more matches due to knee surgery in August, leaving the team without their top goalscorer as it lost against several Western Conference rivals.

To mitigate the loss of Ching, the Dynamo signed Scottish striker Paul Dalglish and relied more heavily on attacking midfielder Dwayne De Rosario, who recorded ten goals and five assists by late September. After a four-match winless streak in September, which still left the Dynamo in second place, Houston went unbeaten in their remaining six league matches (with two wins) to secure a playoff berth, with 46 points. The team also made it to the semifinals of the U.S. Open Cup, where they were eliminated by the Los Angeles Galaxy. De Rosario and defensive midfielder Ricardo Clark were named to the MLS Best XI for their regular season performances.

Houston played against third-seeded Chivas USA, themselves a first-time playoff team, in the Western Conference Semifinals and lost 2–1 in the first leg at the Home Depot Center in Carson, California. After conceding twice before halftime, Brian Ching scored for the Dynamo and Dwayne De Rosario took a penalty kick in the 86th minute that was saved by Chivas goalkeeper Brad Guzan, denying an equalizing goal. In the second leg at home, Houston took advantage of a red card shown to Chivas striker Francisco Palencia and pushed for a series-equalizing goal, which came in the 64th minute on a penalty kick scored by Brad Davis. Ching then scored a header in the third minute of stoppage time to give the Dynamo a 2–0 win, clinching the series with an aggregate score of 3–2 without going to extra time.

In the Western Conference Final, the Houston Dynamo hosted the Colorado Rapids, who had defeated conference-leading Dallas as the fourth seed and were appearing in their second consecutive conference final. Colorado took an early lead on a fourth-minute penalty kick scored by Jovan Kirovski that was awarded after a handball by defender Adrian Serioux in the box. The Dynamo responded with two goals in quick succession by Paul Dalglish: a 5-yard (4.6 m) shot in the 10th minute and a 21st-minute header on a cross by Brian Mullan. Mullan added a third goal for Houston in the 71st minute to clinch a 3–1 victory and an MLS Cup appearance for the team in their inaugural season.

=== Summary of results ===
Note: In all results below, the score of the finalist is given first (H: home; A: away).

New England Revolution				Round	Houston Dynamo			
2nd place in Eastern Conference: Team / Pld / W / L / D / Pts; D.C. United (SS) / 32 / 15 / 7 / 10 / 55; New England Revolution / 32 / 12 / 8 / 12 / 48; Chicago Fire / 32 / 13 / 11 / 8 / 47; New York Red Bulls / 32 / 9 / 11 / 12 / 39; Kansas City Wizards / 32 / 10 / 14 / 8 / 38; Source: MLS Qualified for playoffs Supporters' Shield winner				Regular season	2nd place in Western Conference: Team / Pld / W / L / D / Pts; FC Dallas / 32 / 16 / 12 / 4 / 52; Houston Dynamo / 32 / 11 / 8 / 13 / 46; Chivas USA / 32 / 10 / 9 / 13 / 43; Colorado Rapids / 32 / 11 / 13 / 8 / 41; Los Angeles Galaxy / 32 / 11 / 15 / 6 / 39; Source: MLS Qualified for playoffs			
Opponent	Agg.	1st leg	2nd leg	MLS Cup Playoffs	Opponent	Agg.	1st leg	2nd leg
Chicago Fire	2–2 (p)	0–1 (A)	2–1 (4–2 p) (H)	Conference Semifinals	Chivas USA	3–2	1–2 (A)	2–0 (H)
D.C. United	1–0 (A)			Conference Final	Colorado Rapids	3–1 (H)		

== Broadcasting ==
The MLS Cup final was televised in the United States on ABC in English and Spanish using secondary audio programming, earning a Nielsen rating of 0.8 and an estimated audience of 1.24 million. English play-by-play commentary was provided by Boston-based sportscaster Dave O'Brien and color analysis by Eric Wynalda and former U.S. men's national team coach Bruce Arena. Brandi Chastain provided sideline reporting, while Rob Stone anchored the pre-game and halftime shows. The match was also carried in 96 countries by ESPN International and its associated networks. The MLS Cup pregame show featured Dallas-based choral rock group The Polyphonic Spree, and the halftime show was headlined by Los Angeles alternate rock group Under the Influence of Giants.

== Match ==
=== Analysis ===
In 14 previous meetings from 2001 to 2006 between the New England Revolution and the Houston Dynamo and their predecessor, the San Jose Earthquakes, the Revolution had lost nine matches and drew five. Injuries to several of New England's starting players, including Clint Dempsey, Steve Ralston, and Daniel Hernandez led to uncertainty surrounding the team's starting lineup. The 2006 cup was also considered the last chance for the core players of the Revolution team, as several looked to move to European leagues or retire.

=== Summary ===
External videos
- Full game broadcast on ABC on YouTube

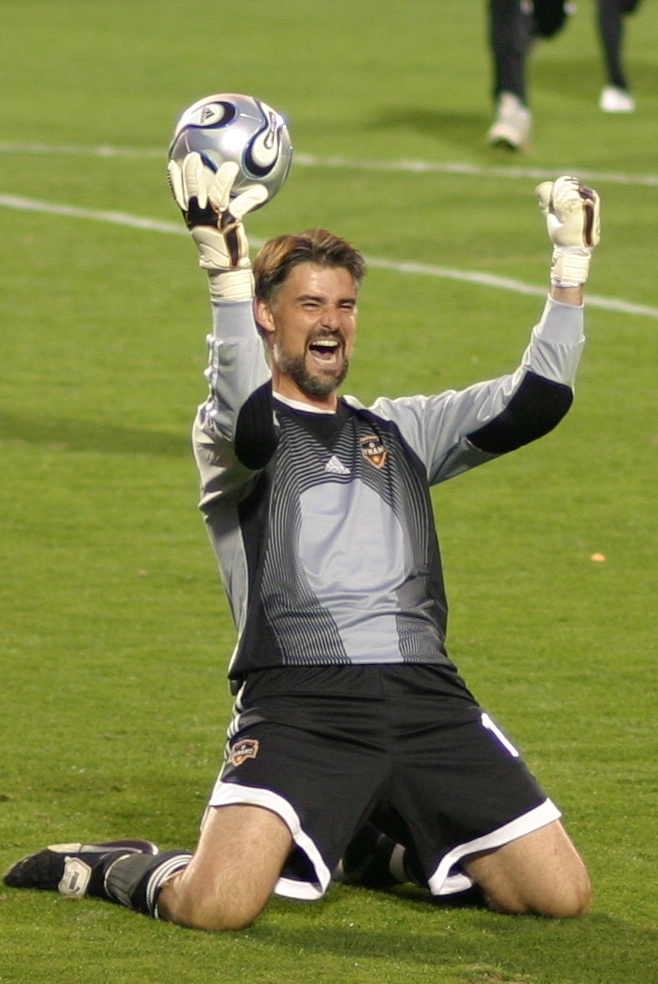
Pat Onstad celebrates after stopping the final penalty kick in the shootout

Several thousand Dynamo fans traveled over 260 miles (420 km) from Houston to Pizza Hut Park for the match in a caravan of buses and hundreds of cars on Interstate 45 that was organized by "Mattress Mack" Jim McIngvale. The fans settled into various sections of the stadium among a sellout crowd of 22,427. A special silver ball was produced by Adidas for the match, based on a variant of the 2006 FIFA World Cup ball.

Houston began the match with a 4–4–2 formation but switched to match New England's 3–5–2 after losing their share of ball possession late in the first half. Despite this, the Dynamo had a chance to score in the 20th minute by Brad Davis that hit the goalpost. It was followed up by a header by Taylor Twellman that was saved by goalkeeper Pat Onstad five minutes later. The Revolution took control of the game and prompted the Dynamo to make their formation switch while relying more on counterattacks. Before halftime, Houston had another chance in the form of a strike from Dwayne De Rosario that was saved by Matt Reis.

New England bolstered their attack early in the second half by substituting attacking midfielder Khano Smith and forward Clint Dempsey, recovering from an ankle injury. Both teams traded shots after 20 minutes of play, with the Revolution requiring a save from Matt Reis on a rebounded attempt by Brad Davis and Dempsey failing to finish a cross from Pat Noonan. Near the end of regulation time in the 86th minute, Jay Heaps headed a ball into the six-yard box towards Taylor Twellman that was cleared away in front of the goal by Brian Ching.

After remaining scoreless through regulation time, the match went into extra time and remained in a defensive stalemate. The Dynamo dropped their attacking players into the midfield and defense to resist pressure from the Revolution, who continued to earn opportunities to score but left themselves vulnerable to counterattacks. Alejandro Moreno, who was substituted late in the second half for Paul Dalglish, missed a header from a corner kick in the 95th minute; this was followed three minutes later by a header from Clint Dempsey that was cleared off the goal line by Wade Barrett.

The opening goal of the match was scored in the 113th minute by Taylor Twellman, who received a slip pass from Khano Smith and made a one-touch shot from 12 yards (11 m) to end New England's 346-minute scoring drought in MLS Cup finals. Twellman and several of his teammates ran across the length of the field to celebrate in front of a section with Revolution fans. Houston responded from kickoff with a forward run and a cross from the right by Brian Mullan to Ching, who headed the ball into the net and tied the match at 1–1 only 71 seconds after Twellman's goal. The match remained tied at the end of extra time, setting up the first penalty shootout in MLS Cup history.

The penalty shootout featured no saves or misses in the first two rounds, with shots scored by Houston's extra time substitutes Kelly Gray and Stuart Holden, and New England's Shalrie Joseph and goalkeeper Matt Reis. Pat Noonan's shot in the third round hit the crossbar, but the score remained level at 3–3 after Twellman converted and Brad Davis's penalty was saved by Matt Reis. Ching, who was later named the MLS Cup MVP, scored the Dynamo's fifth-round penalty to give them a 4–3 lead. Defender Jay Heaps attempted to slot his penalty into the goal, but the shot slowly rolled into the gloves of Pat Onstad to win the match for the Houston Dynamo.

=== Details ===
November 12, 2006
15:30 CST

New England Revolution	1–1 (a.e.t.)	Houston Dynamo
Twellman 113'	Report	Ching 114'
Penalties
Joseph (penalty scored); Reis (penalty scored); Noonan (penalty missed); Twellman (penalty scored); Heaps (penalty missed)	3–4	(penalty scored) Gray; (penalty scored) Holden; (penalty scored) De Rosario; (penalty missed) Davis; (penalty scored) Ching

Pizza Hut Park, Frisco, Texas
Attendance: 22,427
Referee: Jair Marrufo

New England Revolution	Houston Dynamo

GK	1	(United States) Matt Reis
DF	6	(United States) Jay Heaps
DF	4	(Trinidad and Tobago) Avery John
DF	15	(United States) Michael Parkhurst
MF	25	(Wales) Andy Dorman		(substituted off) 62'
MF	8	(United States) Joe Franchino (c)	(yellow card) 16'	(substituted off) 53'
MF	3	(United States) Daniel Hernández		(substituted off) 111'
MF	21	(Grenada) Shalrie Joseph
MF	14	(United States) Steve Ralston
FW	11	(United States) Pat Noonan
FW	20	(United States) Taylor Twellman
Substitutes:
GK	12	(United States) Doug Warren
DF	16	(United States) James Riley
MF	31	(United States) Jeff Larentowicz		(substituted on) 111'
FW	30	(Mexico) José Manuel Abundis
FW	7	(Uruguay) José Cancela
FW	2	(United States) Clint Dempsey		(substituted on) 62'
FW	18	(Bermuda) Khano Smith		(substituted on) 53'
Manager:
(Scotland) Steve Nicol

GK	18	(Canada) Pat Onstad
DF	16	(United States) Craig Waibel	(yellow card) 103'
DF	5	(United States) Ryan Cochrane	(yellow card) 99'	(substituted off) 102'
DF	2	(United States) Eddie Robinson
DF	24	(United States) Wade Barrett (c)
MF	9	(United States) Brian Mullan
MF	14	(Canada) Dwayne De Rosario
MF	51	(Canada) Adrian Serioux		(substituted off) 114'
MF	11	(United States) Brad Davis	(yellow card) 23'
FW	25	(United States) Brian Ching
FW	8	(Scotland) Paul Dalglish		(substituted off) 81'
Substitutes:
GK	1	(United States) Zach Wells
DF	4	(United States) Chris Aloisi
DF	3	(United States) Kevin Goldthwaite
DF	6	(United States) Kelly Gray		(substituted on) 102'
MF	22	(United States) Stuart Holden		(substituted on) 114'
MF	7	(United States) Chris Wondolowski
FW	15	(Venezuela) Alejandro Moreno		(substituted on) 81'
Manager:
(Scotland) Dominic Kinnear

MLS Cup Most Valuable Player:
(United States) Brian Ching (Houston Dynamo)

Assistant referees:
Craig Lowry
Nate Clement
Fourth official:
Kevin Stott

Match rules

- 90 minutes.
- 30 minutes of extra time if necessary.
- Penalty shootout if scores still level.
- Seven named substitutes.
- Maximum of three substitutions.

== Post-match ==
The Dynamo's victory in the MLS Cup brought the first professional sports championship to the city since the Houston Comets won the 2000 WNBA Finals. The team was honored with a victory rally outside Houston City Hall that was attended by 600 fans a few days after the match. The title was technically the third MLS Cup for the franchise, which had won two as the San Jose Earthquakes, but the two teams are considered separate entities. The Dynamo were also received by President George W. Bush at the White House in May 2007, becoming the second MLS team to be honored at the White House. The time between the match's two extra time goals, 71 seconds, tied the record for shortest span in MLS Cup history that was set in 2003 by San Jose and Chicago. New England tied Los Angeles's three MLS Cup losses and was compared to similar perennial runners-up like the Buffalo Bills and Minnesota Vikings of the National Football League.

As the winner of the MLS Cup, Houston qualified for the 2007 CONCACAF Champions' Cup, an eight-team tournament to determine the continental club champion; the second MLS berth that was reserved for the MLS Cup runners-up was replaced with one for the winner of the Supporters' Shield. The Dynamo played Costa Rican club Puntarenas F.C. in the quarterfinal and advanced with a 2–1 aggregate score, winning 2–0 in the second leg at their preseason home in College Station. Houston then faced Mexican Clasura champion Pachuca in the semifinals and won the first leg 2–0 after a one-day delay due to a power outage. In the second leg hosted by Pachuca, the Dynamo conceded four goals to tie the series 4–4 and force extra time, where Pachuca scored a winning penalty kick to advance 5–4 on aggregate to the final.

The two clubs would meet again in the following final, playing in the first repeat match-up in MLS Cup history; Houston defeated New England 2–1 in regulation time and defended their title. In the 2008 SuperLiga Final, hosted by New England at Gillette Stadium, the two teams drew 2–2 after extra time and played in a penalty shootout that the Revolution won 6–5 after eight rounds. The Dynamo appeared in two more MLS Cup finals, played in 2011 and 2012, losing both to the Los Angeles Galaxy at the Home Depot Center in Carson, California. New England qualified for their fifth MLS Cup final in 2014, also losing to the Galaxy in Carson. Both teams would go on to win the U.S. Open Cup, with New England defeating FC Dallas in 2007 and Houston defeating the Philadelphia Union in 2018.
