= Brad Davis (soccer) =

American soccer player (born 1981)

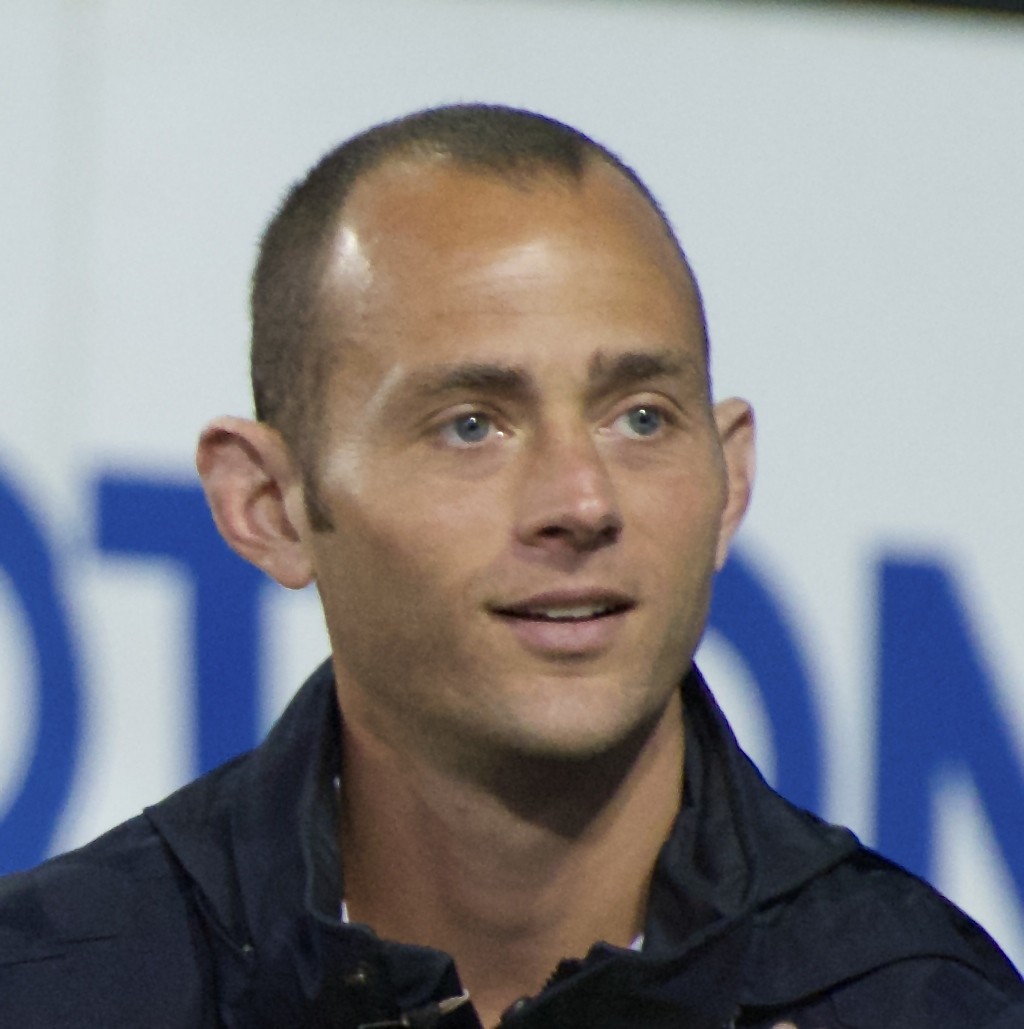
- Davis in 2014

Personal information
- Full name: Bradley Joseph Davis
- Date of birth: November 8, 1981 (age 44)
- Place of birth: Saint Charles, Missouri, United States
- Height: 5 ft 11 in (1.80 m)
- Position: Midfielder

College career
Years	Team	Apps	(Gls)
2000–2001	Saint Louis Billikens	40	(21)

Senior career*
Years	Team	Apps	(Gls)
2002	MetroStars	24	(4)
2003–2004	Dallas Burn	55	(8)
2005	San Jose Earthquakes	18	(2)
2006–2015	Houston Dynamo	271	(41)
2016	Sporting Kansas City	24	(2)
Total		392	(57)

International career^{‡}
2001	United States U20	3	(1)
2005–2014	United States	17	(0)
Medal record
Representing United States
Winner	CONCACAF Gold Cup	2005
Men's Soccer
- * Club domestic league appearances and goals as of October 23, 2016 ‡ National team caps and goals as of June 28, 2014

Bradley Joseph Davis (born November 8, 1981) is an American former professional soccer player who played as a midfielder.

== Career ==
=== Youth and college ===
Davis attended high school at Chaminade College Preparatory School in Missouri. When he was 16, he had the chance to move to The Netherlands and join the PSV Eindhoven academy, but Davis opted to stay at home. He joined Saint Louis University (SLU) in 2000, where he played for two seasons before leaving college soccer for the professional ranks. While at SLU, Davis was named the Conference USA Freshman of the Year his first year, and a second team NSCAA All-American as a sophomore.

=== Professional ===
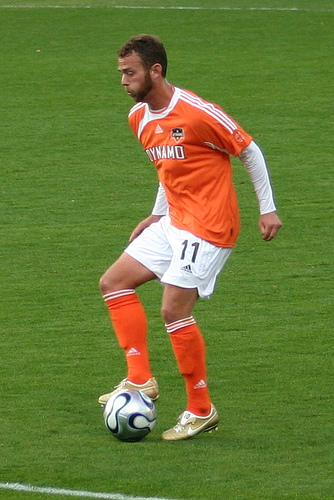
Davis playing for Houston Dynamo in 2006

Davis was selected third overall in the 2002 MLS SuperDraft by the MetroStars. On April 6, he scored his first career MLS goal, scoring the winner to give the MetroStars a 2–1 win over the Columbus Crew. He scored four goals in 24 appearances in his debut season, and was a finalist for the MLS Rookie of the Year Award. He was then traded to the Dallas Burn for the fourth overall pick in the 2003 MLS SuperDraft.

In his second year with the team, new coach Colin Clarke tried to move Davis to the center of the field to play attacking midfielder. After making little impact through several games, however, Davis returned to the left. There he had to compete with newcomer Eric Quill for playing time. Davis finished the season with only two goals and two assists despite playing more minutes than in 2003, as the Burn yet again missed the playoffs.

On MLS draft day 2005 Davis was traded to the San Jose Earthquakes with cash and the #4 draft pick in exchange for Richard Mulrooney, Arturo Alvarez and the #6 draft pick. That season he made 18 MLS appearances for San Jose, scoring two goals. Davis did not appear for them in the MLS play-offs due to a groin strain. After the 2005 season, the club moved to Houston and was rechristened the Houston Dynamo.

For the 2006 season, Davis had a team high 11 assists as the Dynamo finished second in the Western Conference and qualified for the playoffs. In the second leg of the semi-finals against Chivas USA, Davis scored on a penalty kick to tie the aggregate score. The Dynamo won the tie 3–2 on aggregate. He helped the team reach the final by getting two assists in a 3–1 win over the Colorado Rapids in the conference finals. In the final, the Dynamo defeated the New England Revolution on penalties.

In 2007, Davis missed extensive time due to a torn right meniscus he suffered in practice. He returned from injury in time for the playoffs. The Dynamo matched up with Davis's former team FC Dallas (known as the Dallas Burn while Davis played there) in the first round. He scored on a free kick in the 100th minute of the second leg to give the Dynamo a 4–2 win on aggregate. In the final against the Revolution, Davis assisted on the winning goal by Dwayne De Rosario in the 74th minute, giving the Dynamo a 2–1 win.

In 2008, Davis and the Dynamo finished first in the west, but were upset in the first round of the playoffs by the New York Red Bulls. The Dynamo had success in the North American SuperLiga that year, however the Revolution got revenge by beating Davis and the Dynamo on penalties.

In 2009, Davis had a strong season individually, being named an MLS all star and scoring 5 and assisting on 12 in MLS play, and the team finished 2nd in the west. However the Dynamo lost in the Conference Finals to the Los Angeles Galaxy. For 2010, Davis would match the previous season's stats and once again make the all star team, but this time the Dynamo would miss the playoffs.

2011 saw Davis lead MLS in assists with 16, make the all star team and finish as a finalist for the league MVP Award. However, despite helping the Dynamo advance to their third-ever MLS Cup, Davis missed the final after suffering a torn quadriceps in an Eastern Conference Final win over Sporting Kansas City. Houston would lose to the Galaxy 1–0.

During the 2012 season, he scored a personal best of 8 goals, made the 2012 all star team, and lead the Houston Dynamo to the MLS Cup final. Despite taking an early lead, the Dynamo would fall once again to the Galaxy, this time by a score of 3–1.

In 2013, he recorded 4 goals and 9 assists, made his 5th straight all star team, and again helped Houston qualify for the playoffs. However this time they would fall to Kansas City in the conference finals. Davis scored the game-winning goal in the 1st leg of the CONCACAF Champions League quarterfinals vs Santos Laguna, but they fell 3–1 on aggregate.

Ahead of the 2016 season, Davis was traded to Sporting Kansas City for picks in the 2017 and 2018 MLS SuperDrafts as well as future considerations. He retired following the 2016 season.

In February 2017, Davis and the Houston Dynamo agreed to a one-day contract, allowing him to officially retire as a member of the Houston Dynamo organization.

=== International ===
Davis has played for several youth United States national teams. He played for the U.S. at the 2001 World Youth Championship in Argentina for the Under-23 team. Davis received his first cap for the senior team July 7, 2005 in a Gold Cup match against Cuba. He also converted the clinching penalty kick in the United States' shootout victory over Panama in the Gold Cup final. Davis has also recorded four assists with the United States men's national soccer team, including the assist on Graham Zusi's goal on October 15, 2013, against Panama that eliminated Panama from the 2014 FIFA World Cup and saw Mexico qualify. Davis was included on Jürgen Klinsmann's 30-man preliminary roster for the 2014 FIFA World Cup. Davis subsequently made the final 23 that will go to the World Cup. In the USMNT's first send-off game against Azerbaijan, Davis came off the bench and assisted Aron Johannsson on the United States' second goal of the night to make the score 2–0, which was also the final score. He was in the starting lineup for a group stage game against Germany.

== Personal life ==
Davis is married to Heather Davis. Davis is a Christian. He has done charity work involving veterans, such as providing free tickets to games and helping veterans return to civilian life.

== Career statistics ==
As of 30 May 2018

Club	Season	League	League			MLS Playoffs			US Open Cup			Continental			Total		
Club	Season	League	Apps	Goals	Assists	Apps	Goals	Assists	Apps	Goals	Assists	Apps	Goals	Assists	Apps	Goals	Assists
New York/New Jersey MetroStars	2002	MLS	24	4	3	—			1	0	0	—			25	4	3
Dallas Burn	2003	MLS	26	6	5	—			1	0	0	—			27	6	5
Dallas Burn	2004	MLS	29	2	2	—			3	0	0	—			32	2	2
San Jose Earthquakes	2005	MLS	18	2	8	0	0	0	1	0	1	—			19	2	9
Houston Dynamo	2006	MLS	28	1	11	4	1	2	2	0	1	—			34	2	14
Houston Dynamo	2007	MLS	17	3	3	4	1	1	0	0	0	4 (Note: Appearances in CONCACAF Champions League)	0	1	25	4	5
Houston Dynamo	2008	MLS	26	3	8	2	0	0	0	0	0	7 (Note: 1 Appearance in CONCACAF Champions League, 6 Appearances 3 assists in North American SuperLiga)	0	3	35	3	11
Houston Dynamo	2009	MLS	27	5	12	3	0	0	2	0	0	7 (Note: Appearances in CONCACAF Champions League)	0	1	39	5	12
Houston Dynamo	2010	MLS	27	5	12	—			0	0	0	3 (Note: Appearances in North American SuperLiga)	0	0	27	5	12
Houston Dynamo	2011	MLS	34	4	16	3	0	2	0	0	0	—			37	4	18
Houston Dynamo	2012	MLS	31	8	12	6	0	3	0	0	0	1 (Note: Appearances in CONCACAF Champions League)	0	0	38	8	15
Houston Dynamo	2013	MLS	26	4	9	5	1	1	0	0	0	3 (Note: Appearances in CONCACAF Champions League)	1	1	34	6	11
Houston Dynamo	2014	MLS	25	4	11	—			0	0	0	—			25	4	11
Houston Dynamo	2015	MLS	30	4	10	—			1	0	0	—			31	4	10
Sporting Kansas City	2016	MLS	24	2	1	0	0	0	2	1	0	1 (Note: Appearances in CONCACAF Champions League)	0	0	27	3	1
New York/New Jersey MetroStars Totals			24	4	3	0	0	0	1	0	0	0	0	0	25	4	3
Dallas Burn Totals			55	8	7	0	0	0	4	0	0	0	0	0	59	8	7
San Jose Earthquakes Totals			18	2	8	0	0	0	1	0	1	0	0	0	19	2	9
Houston Dynamo Totals			271	41	104	27	3	9	5	0	1	25	1	6	328	45	120
Sporting Kansas City Totals			24	2	1	0	0	0	2	1	0	1	0	0	27	3	1
Career Totals			392	57	123	27	3	9	13	1	2	26	1	6	458	62	140

== Honors ==
=== Team ===
United States

- CONCACAF Gold Cup (1): 2005

San Jose Earthquakes

- Supporters' Shield (1): 2005

Houston Dynamo

- MLS Cup (2): 2006, 2007
- Western Conference (playoffs) (2): 2006, 2007
- Eastern Conference (playoffs) (2): 2011, 2012

=== Individual ===
MLS

- MLS 50/50 Club
- MLS All-Star (6x): 2005, 2009, 2010, 2011, 2012, 2013
- MLS MVP runner-up: 2011
- MLS Best XI: 2011
- 3rd-most assists all-time in MLS
- Most MLS appearances in Dynamo history
- 2nd-most appearances in Dynamo history in all competitions
- 3rd-most goals in Dynamo history (MLS and all competitions)
- Most assists in Dynamo history (MLS and all competitions)
- Dynamo team MVP (4x): 2009, 2010, 2011, 2012

Sporting positions
Preceded by Brian Ching	Houston Dynamo captain 2013–2015	Succeeded by Giles Barnes
