= Craig Waibel =

American soccer player

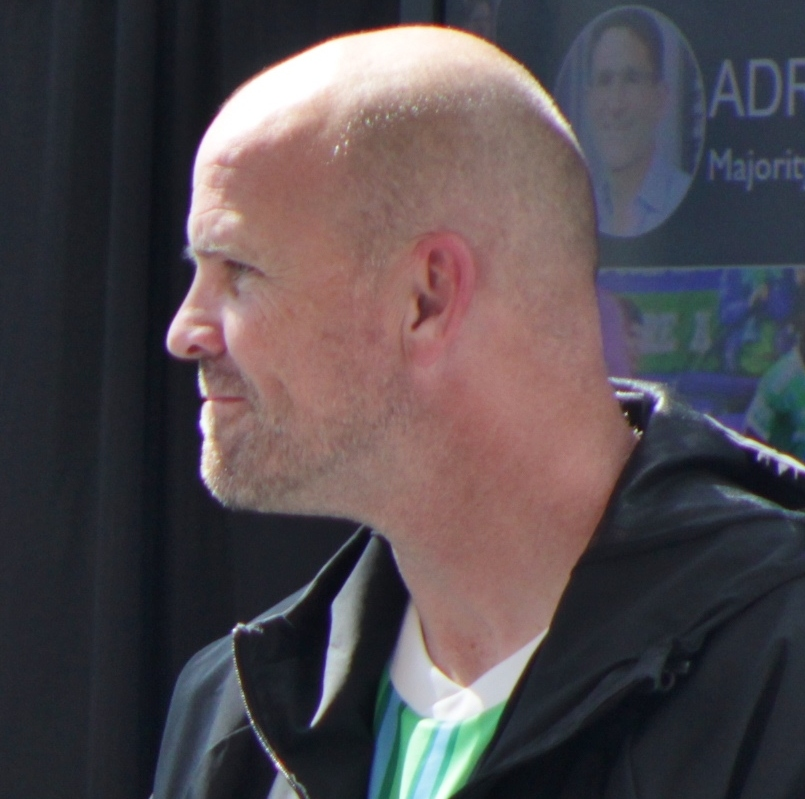
- Waibel in 2025

Personal information
- Full name: Craig Waibel
- Date of birth: August 21, 1975 (age 51)
- Place of birth: Portland, Oregon, United States
- Height: 6 ft 2 in (1.88 m)
- Position: Rightback

Youth career
- 1995–1998: Washington Huskies

Senior career*
Years	Team	Apps	(Gls)
1996–1998	Spokane Shadow		
1999–2000	Seattle Sounders	54	(4)
2000	→ Colorado Rapids (loan)	2	(0)
2001–2002	Los Angeles Galaxy	21	(0)
2001	→ Seattle Sounders (loan)	1	(0)
2002	→ Seattle Sounders (loan)	5	(0)
2003–2005	San Jose Earthquakes	53	(1)
2006–2010	Houston Dynamo	80	(6)

Managerial career
- 2011: Michigan Wolverines (assistant)
- 2012–2013: Washington Huskies (assistant)
- 2014: Real Salt Lake (assistant)
- 2015: Real Salt Lake (technical director)
- 2015 - 2019: Real Salt Lake (general manager)
- 2021: Seattle Sounders FC (sporting director)
- 2022 -: Seattle Sounders FC (general manager)
- * Club domestic league appearances and goals

Craig Waibel (born August 21, 1975, in Portland, Oregon) is a former American soccer player who spent eleven seasons in Major League Soccer. He was hired as the sporting director of Seattle Sounders FC in April 2021 and became their general manager in 2022.

== Playing career ==
=== Amateur and college ===
Waibel was born in Portland, Oregon, and spent several years in Coeur d'Alene, Idaho, before his family moved to Spokane, Washington. There, he played for a youth team that traveled to statewide competitions and later Lewis and Clark High School, where Waibel graduated in 1994. During his senior year at Lewis and Clark, he chose to play college soccer at the University of Washington ahead of several other college programs in the Pacific Northwest. Waibel played for four years with the Washington Huskies and captained them for two seasons as the team made consecutive NCAA Tournament appearances. He scored his first collegiate goal from a penalty kick in a 1998 Nike Classic match against the Wisconsin Badgers, which the Huskies won 5–1.

In 1996, Waibel was injured playing for the Spokane Shadow in the USISL Premier League, forcing him to miss his junior college season. Despite that setback, Waibel continued to play for the Shadow in 1997 and 1998.

=== Professional ===
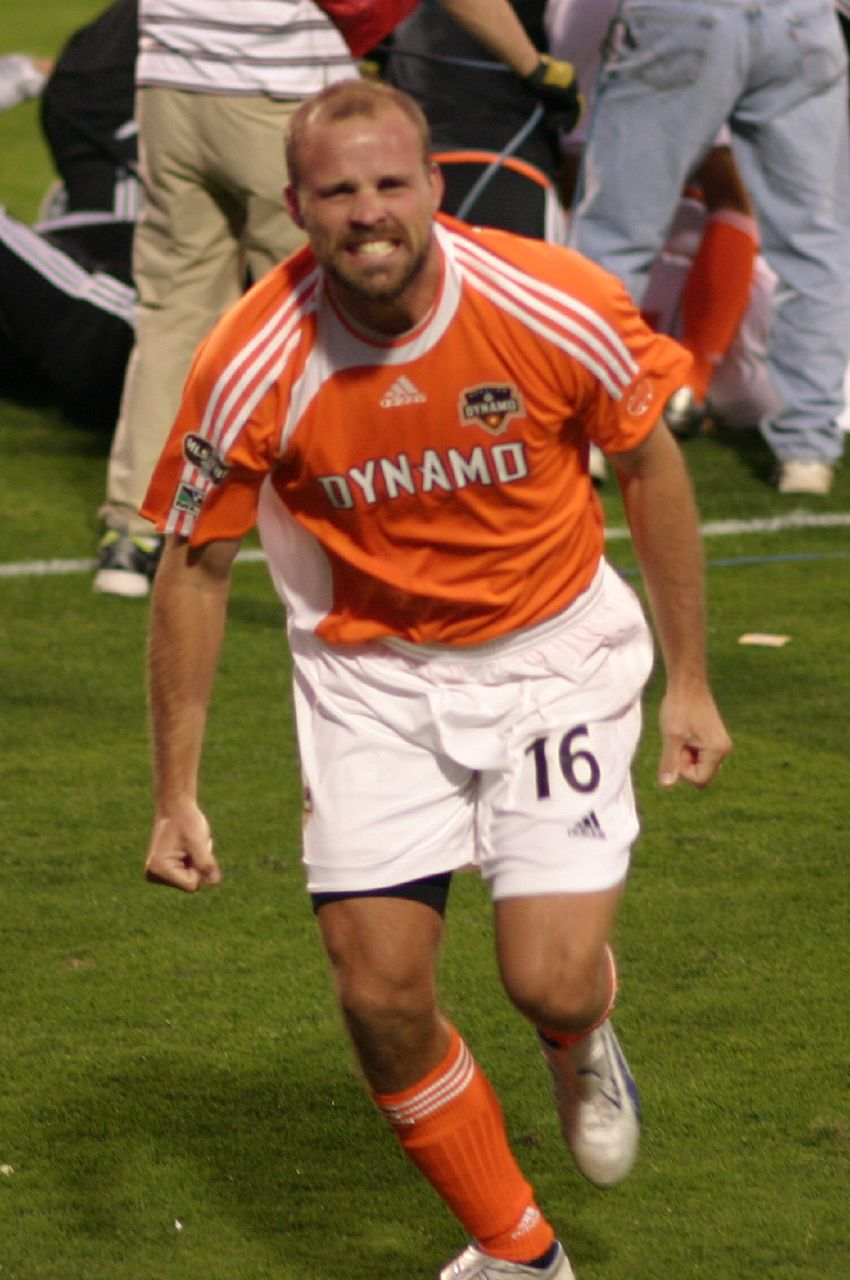
Waibel at the MLS Cup 2006

Upon graduating, Waibel was not selected in the 1999 MLS College Draft. The Seattle Sounders picked him 17th overall in the 1999 A-League draft. He earned a brief call up to the Colorado Rapids in the early part of the 2000 season, but played 27 matches for the Sounders, scoring three goals. Waibel was selected by the San Jose Earthquakes in the 2001 MLS SuperDraft with the 31st overall pick but then waived a month later. The Los Angeles Galaxy signed him soon after as a discovery player. Waibel was part of the Galaxy's run to win the 2002 MLS Cup, making 12 appearances for the eventual champions. In addition to playing for the Galaxy, Waibel went on loan to the Sounders in both 2001 and 2002.

The following year, Waibel was waived by the Galaxy and was selected again by the San Jose Earthquakes in the 2002 Waiver Draft. He won his second straight MLS Cup in 2003, this time with the Quakes. For the 2004 season, Waibel stayed with the Earthquakes and scored his first professional goal, as well as a goal in the 2004 MLS Cup Playoffs. His 2005 season was cut short after knee injury he picked up against Santa Clara University in an exhibition game.

The Earthquakes relocated and became the Houston Dynamo before the 2006 season. During the season, Waibel made 28 appearances and scored a career-high five goals. Waibel notched his first career two-goal game in the October 14 season finale against Colorado. Waibel became a fan-favorite player for the Houston Dynamo also starting the 'Waibel's Warriors' charity group to benefit local foundations. With four championships, Wabiel is tied fifth among players for the most MLS Cups won.

In July 2010, Waibel was released by the Dynamo.

== Coaching and administration career ==
Waibel served as an assistant coach for the University of Michigan in 2011. He was then announced as an assistant coach for the Washington Huskies men's soccer program for the 2012 season. After serving as an assistant coach for Real Salt Lake during the 2014 season he was promoted to technical director for the 2015 season. In August 2015, he was promoted to general manager for the club. In September 2019, Real Salt Lake and Waibel parted ways.

On April 1, 2021, Seattle Sounders FC announced their hiring of Waibel as sporting director, working alongside former Real Salt Lake general manager Garth Lagerwey. He was reunited with his former youth coach Brian Schmetzer, now head coach of the Sounders. After Lagerwey left for Atlanta United FC, the Sounders appointed Waibel as general manager on November 30, 2022.

== Personal life ==
Waibel's twin brother, Chad, is an American football coach in Croatia. His older brother Mario was a professional lacrosse player and later coach.

== Honors ==
Los Angeles Galaxy

- Lamar Hunt U.S. Open Cup (1): 2001
- MLS Cup (1): 2002
- Supporters' Shield (1): 2002
- Western Conference Championship (1): 2002

San Jose Earthquakes

- MLS Cup (1): 2003
- Supporters' Shield (1): 2005
- Western Conference Championship (1): 2003

Houston Dynamo

- MLS Cup (2): 2006, 2007
- Western Conference Championship (2): 2006, 2007
