= Julian Nash =

American soccer player & US National Champion Footgolfer

Personal information
- Full name: Julian Nash
- Date of birth: March 1, 1983 (age 43)
- Place of birth: Oakland, CA, United States
- Height: 6 ft 0 in (1.83 m)
- Position: Forward

Team information
- Current team: Santa Clara Sporting Men's Team
- Number: 21

College career
Years	Team	Apps	(Gls)
2001–04	Creighton Bluejays		

Senior career*
Years	Team	Apps	(Gls)
2004	Chicago Fire Premier	13	(12)
2005	San Jose Earthquakes	10	(1)
2006–2007	Houston Dynamo	6	(0)
2010–	Santa Clara Sporting Men's Team		
- * Club domestic league appearances and goals as of 25 June 2006 ‡ National team caps and goals as of 13 April 2006

Julian Nash (born March 1, 1983, in Oakland, California) is the 2017 US National Champion Footgolfer and an American soccer player who currently plays for Santa Clara Sporting Men's Team in the Peninsula Soccer League and recently joined the prestigious coed varsity soccer club, The Lions, who have dominated Wednesday night soccer leagues in San Francisco for several years.

== Career ==
=== High school and College ===
Nash attended San Leandro High School and participated in cross country, soccer, and tennis. In soccer, he was named the Team MVP as a sophomore and as a senior.

=== Professional ===
Nash was signed by the San Jose Earthquakes as a developmental player in March 2005 after an outstanding collegiate career at Creighton, and a stellar season in the USL Premier Development League where he scored 12 goals in 13 games for Chicago Fire Premier. With the Blue Jays, Nash scored 18 goals and recorded 22 assists in four years and was named a semifinalist for the prestigious Hermann Trophy his senior season. He also led the 2004 Lamar Hunt U.S. Open Cup with four goals while playing for the Chicago Fire Reserves.

He played 10 games for San Jose in 2005 and scored in his only start against Real Salt Lake October 8. He appeared in all 12 reserve games for San Jose, scoring four goals. Along with the rest of his Earthquakes teammates, he moved to Houston for the 2006 season. He was released from the Houston Dynamo in 2007 following a prolonged foot injury.

He currently plays for the amateur Santa Clara Sporting Men's Team in the Peninsula Soccer League.
