= Martin Hutton =

American former soccer player (born 1982)

Personal information
- Full name: Martin Harold Hutton
- Date of birth: January 21, 1982 (age 44)
- Place of birth: New Orleans, Louisiana, United States
- Height: 6 ft 2 in (1.88 m)
- Position: Goalkeeper

Youth career
- 2000–01: Clemson Tigers
- 2002–04: Saint Louis Billikens

Senior career*
Years	Team	Apps	(Gls)
2003	Boulder Rapids Reserve	5	(0)
2005	Kansas City Wizards	0	(0)
2006	Houston Dynamo	0	(0)
2006	→ Portland Timbers (loan)	2	(0)

Managerial career
- 2007: St. Louis University (assistant)
- * Club domestic league appearances and goals as of 21 July 2006 ‡ National team caps and goals as of 21 July 2006

Martin Hutton (born January 21, 1982) is an American former soccer player, who last played for Houston Dynamo of Major League Soccer in 2006.

== Youth ==
Hutton was born in New Orleans, Louisiana. When he was twelve, Hutton's family moved from Louisiana to Spring, Texas, where he played club soccer with the Houston Texans. Hutton attended Klein High School where he played soccer under coach Allen Baker. He became the only freshman to start in Klein's history and became the only freshman goalkeeper to win a state championship when Klein took the 1997 Texas 5A State Championship. Klein repeated as state champion in 1999 while Hutton earned regional and state MVP honors in 1999.

== U-16 & U-17 national teams ==
Hutton was part of the U-16 National Team, as well as, the inaugural U.S. residency program with the U.S. U-17s in Bradenton, Florida. Played with Donavan, Beasley, Bekerman, Convey, and Onyewu as part of the 17s. As an amateur he was part of the U.S. Amateur National team from 2001 to 2003 gaining experience and getting wins against several MLS teams.

== College ==
Hutton began his collegiate soccer career at Clemson University from in 2000. He redshirted his first season due to injury and played in 5 matches the next year before transferring to Saint Louis University after the 2001 season. He spent the next 3 years in Saint Louis where he started 50 of 54 games accumulating 205 saves, 14 shutouts, and a goals against average of 1.03. Ranks among the top ten lists in several categories.

== Professional ==
Upon graduating from Saint Louis in 2005, he was signed by the Kansas City Wizards to a developmental contract and was placed on their reserve squad. He failed to break into the first team and spent the preseason training with the Houston Dynamo before the Wizards traded him to the Dynamos for a fourth-round pick in the 2007 MLS Supplemental Draft. In June 2006 season, the Dynamo sent Hutton on loan to the Portland Timbers. Unfortunately for Hutton, Houston had two very competent goalkeepers in front of him, 2003 MLS Goalkeeper of the Year Pat Onstad and Zack Wells, and the young keeper did not get any playing time in the 2006 season.

== Retirement ==
The Dynamo released Hutton before the 2007 preseason. After a trial with the USL First Division team Miami FC and contemplating other offers, Hutton decided to retire and return St. Louis University as a graduate assistant under the tutelage of head coach Dan Donigan. He is currently pursuing an M.B.A in finance and is the goalkeeper coach of Saint Louis University men's soccer team, as well as, SLSG Metro of the U.S. Development Academy Program.
