= Mpho Moloi =

South African soccer player

Personal information
- Full name: Mpho Patrick Moloi
- Date of birth: 20 May 1983 (age 43)
- Place of birth: Soweto, South Africa
- Height: 5 ft 9 in (1.75 m)
- Position: Midfielder

Youth career
- 2002–2005: Connecticut Huskies

Senior career*
Years	Team	Apps	(Gls)
2006–2007	Houston Dynamo	0	(0)
2008–2009	Benoni Premier United		
2010	Harrisburg City Islanders	12	(0)
- * Club domestic league appearances and goals as of 15 August 2010

Mpho Moloi (born 20 May 1983) is a South African former soccer player.

== Career ==
=== College ===
Moloi attended a soccer academy in South Africa named Transnet School of Excellence before moving to Newark, New Jersey when he was a teenager. He attended Saint Benedict's Preparatory School for his junior and senior years of high school, helping the Grey Bees to consecutive NJISAA prep championships. He also helped the Grey Bees win a national championship in 2001.

He went on to play college soccer at the University of Connecticut, where he was a regular for four years and captain for three years. Moloi earned all-Big East honors three times, including first-team status his senior year, and was named Big East Midfielder of the Year in 2005.

=== Professional ===
Moloi was drafted by Houston Dynamo in the 2006 MLS Supplemental Draft, and made one start for the team in the US Open Cup, but never saw any league playing time in two MLS years.

He returned home to South Africa in 2008, and played two seasons for Thanda Royal Zulu in the Vodacom League, before returning to the United States in 2010. Moloi signed with the Harrisburg City Islanders of the USL Second Division in 2010, and made his debut for them on 17 April 2010 in Harrisburg's opening day 2–2 tie with the Richmond Kickers.
