= Chris Aloisi =

American soccer player

Personal information
- Date of birth: February 21, 1981 (age 45)
- Place of birth: North Babylon, New York, United States
- Height: 5 ft 10 in (1.78 m)
- Position: Midfielder

College career
Years	Team	Apps	(Gls)
1999–2003	Syracuse Orange		

Senior career*
Years	Team	Apps	(Gls)
2003–2004	Los Angeles Galaxy	4	(0)
2004–2005	San Jose Earthquakes	6	(0)
2005–2006	Houston Dynamo	0	(0)
2006–2008	Rochester Rhinos	23	(0)
2008–2009	Long Island Rough Riders	19	(0)

Managerial career
- 2010–2011: Adelphi Panthers (asst.)
- * Club domestic league appearances and goals

Chris Aloisi (born February 21, 1981) is an American retired soccer player and coach.

== Career ==
=== College ===
Aloisi played four years of college soccer at Syracuse University, where he was named to the All-Big East third-team twice.

=== Professional ===
Aloisi was drafted 57th overall in the 2004 MLS SuperDraft by Los Angeles Galaxy. He struggled to get much playing time in a deep 2004 Galaxy defense, and was traded to the San Jose Earthquakes in the off-season in a four-player deal. Along with the rest of his Earthquakes teammates, he moved to Houston to play for the new Houston Dynamo for the 2006 season. Following that season, Aloisi and the team decided to part ways, having never made a first team appearance for Houston.

For the 2007 Season, Aloisi returned to his home state to play for the Rochester Raging Rhinos in the USL First Division. Aloisi took the rightback spot vacated by the departing Frank Sanfilippo, and eventually played in 19 games for the team, before leaving to take a player/assistant coach role with the Long Island Rough Riders in the USL Premier Development League.

== Honors ==
=== Houston Dynamo ===
- Major League Soccer MLS Cup (1): 2006
