= Kelly Gray (soccer) =

American soccer player

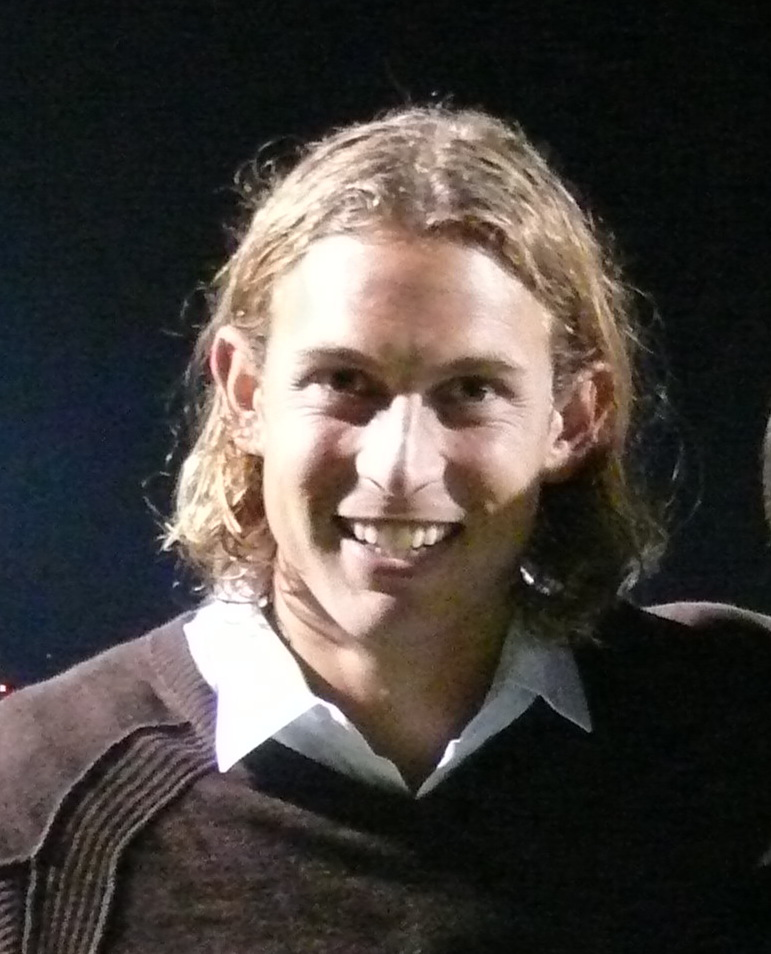

Personal information
- Full name: Kelly Lawrence Kirmil Gray
- Date of birth: April 7, 1981 (age 45)
- Place of birth: Palo Alto, California, U.S.
- Height: 6 ft 2 in (1.88 m)
- Positions: Defender; midfielder

College career
| Years | Team | Apps | (Gls) |
| 1999–2001 | Portland Pilots | | |

Senior career*
| Years | Team | Apps | (Gls) |
| 2002–2005 | Chicago Fire | 88 | (6) |
| 2005 | San Jose Earthquakes | 22 | (1) |
| 2006–2007 | Houston Dynamo | 28 | (0) |
| 2007 | Los Angeles Galaxy | 6 | (0) |
| 2008 | Colorado Rapids | 2 | (0) |
| 2008–2009 | San Jose Earthquakes | 21 | (0) |
| Total | | 167 | (7) |

International career
| 2001 | United States U20 | 3 | (0) |
- * Club domestic league appearances and goals

Kelly Gray (born April 7, 1981) is an American former soccer player. He does commentary for San Jose Earthquakes games on Comcast Sports Net Bay Area

== Career ==
=== College ===
Gray played forward and midfielder at the University of Portland from 1999 to 2001. He scored a total of 32 goals and 12 assists in his three years for the Pilots and was voted a second-team All-American and first-team All-WCC as a junior.

=== Professional ===
After his junior season, Gray signed a Project-40 contract with MLS, and was selected fifth overall in the 2002 MLS SuperDraft by the Chicago Fire. Gray made an immediate impact with the Fire, starting twenty games as a rookie while scoring two goals and five assists. He appeared in 28 games in 2003, again starting twenty, while scoring two goals and one assist. While playing more defensively in 2004, he started 23 games for the Fire, scoring one goal. Gray's versatility may have been a hindrance to his development, however, as even three years into his career with the Fire, it is unclear what his position should be; although a consistent starter, he was longing to play in his hometown.

Gray was traded to San Jose Earthquakes in June 2005 in exchange for a second-round pick in the 2006 MLS SuperDraft. Along with the rest of his Earthquakes teammates, he moved to Houston for the 2006 season. Gray scored the winning goal in the second leg of Houston's Champions' Cup tie with Puntarenas. In June 2007, Gray was traded with a second-round pick in the 2008 MLS SuperDraft to Los Angeles Galaxy in exchange for Nate Jaqua. He made his debut in Galaxy's 2–0 victory over Chicago on 4 July 2007.

Due to the Galaxy's increased salary cap restrictions, Gray was waived at the end of the 2007 season. He was picked up by Colorado Rapids at the start of the 2008 season, but played just two games for them before being traded with Jovan Kirovski to the newly reformed San Jose Earthquakes franchise in exchange for Preston Burpo and a fourth-round pick in the 2009 MLS SuperDraft. Gray stayed with San Jose until he was waived on June 25, 2009. He promptly retired from professional soccer choosing instead to run his own soccer academy, the "Kelly Gray Soccer Academy."

=== International ===
Gray has played extensively with the Youth United States national teams, including at the 2001 World Youth Championship in Argentina, and has most recently been with the Under-23 team, which he captained in January 2003.

== Trivia ==
Gray is the owner of a company called Adesso Clothing.

== Honors ==
=== San Jose Earthquakes ===
- Major League Soccer Supporters' Shield (1): 2005

=== Houston Dynamo ===
- Major League Soccer MLS Cup (1): 2006
