= Zach Wells =

American soccer player

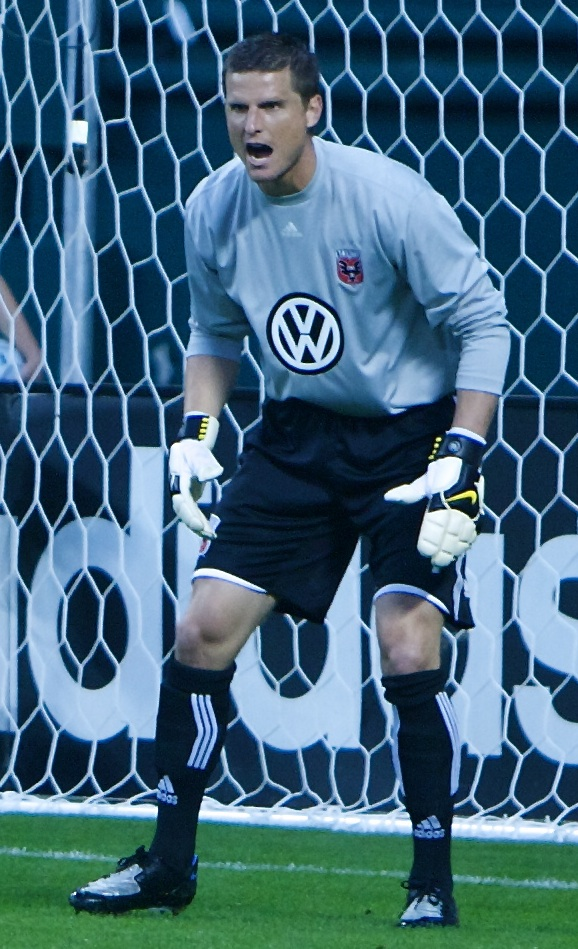

Personal information
- Full name: Zachary Stephen Wells
- Date of birth: 26 February 1981 (age 45)
- Place of birth: Costa Mesa, California, United States
- Height: 6 ft 2 in (1.88 m)
- Position: Goalkeeper

Youth career
- 1999–2003: UCLA Bruins

Senior career*
Years	Team	Apps	(Gls)
2004–2005	MetroStars	19	(0)
2006–2007	Houston Dynamo	4	(0)
2008	D.C. United	17	(0)
Total		40	(0)

International career
2006	United States	1	(0)
- * Club domestic league appearances and goals

Zachary Stephen Wells (born February 26, 1981, in Costa Mesa, California) is an American former professional soccer player who played as a goalkeeper.

== College ==
Wells played college soccer at UCLA from 1999 to 2003, where he helped the school to the NCAA Championship as a junior, and was named first-team All-Pac-10 as a senior.

== MLS ==
Upon graduating, Wells was selected 21st overall in the 2004 MLS SuperDraft by the MetroStars. He spent much of the season backing up national teamer Jonny Walker, but played two games in mid-season. In 2005, with Walker recovering from surgery, Wells took over the starting role, and played well, leading to Walker's trade to Columbus. But the return of Tony Meola to the club left Wells being a backup again. He was traded to Houston for a 4th round pick in the 2006 MLS SuperDraft. He was acquired along with a conditional draft pick by D.C. United for Bobby Boswell on December 12, 2007.

Wells announced his retirement from professional soccer on February 17, 2009, just a month before the start of the 2009 MLS season.

== National team ==
Wells earned his only cap for the U.S. national team on February 19, 2006, in a 4–0 victory over Guatemala at Pizza Hut Park in Frisco, Texas.

== Honors ==
=== Houston Dynamo ===
- Major League Soccer MLS Cup (2): 2006, 2007
