= 2001 San Jose Earthquakes season =

San Jose Earthquakes
2001 season
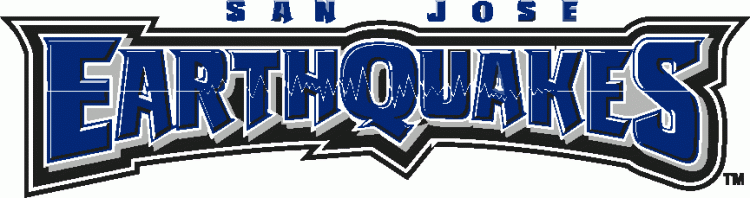
- Owner: AEG
- Coach: Frank Yallop
- Stadium: Spartan Stadium
- Major League Soccer: Division: 2nd Overall: 5th
- MLS Cup: Champions
- U.S. Open Cup: Quarterfinals
- California Clásico: 1st
- Top goalscorer: Ronald Cerritos (11)
- Average home league attendance: 9,635
Home colors	Away colors

The 2001 San Jose Earthquakes season was the sixth season of the team's existence, and saw the franchise win its first MLS Cup.

== Squad ==
=== Current squad ===
As of August 18, 2009. Note: Flags indicate national team as defined under FIFA eligibility rules; some limited exceptions apply. Players may hold more than one non-FIFA nationality.

No.	Pos.	Nation	Player
0	GK	USA	Jon Conway
1	GK	USA	Joe Cannon
2	DF	USA	Eddie Robinson
5	MF	USA	Ramiro Corrales
6	FW	DEN	Ronnie Ekelund
7	MF	USA	Ian Russell
8	DF	USA	Richard Mulrooney
9	MF	USA	Scott Bower
10	FW	USA	Landon Donovan
11	MF	USA	Manny Lagos
12	DF	USA	Jeff Agoos

No.	Pos.	Nation	Player
13	MF	USA	Chris Carrieri
14	MF	CAN	Dwayne De Rosario
15	FW	GHA	Junior Agogo
17	DF	USA	Jimmy Conrad
18	MF	USA	Wojtek Krakowiak
19	DF	USA	Troy Dayak
20	FW	SLV	Ronald Cerritos
22	DF	USA	Zak Ibsen
24	DF	USA	Wade Barrett
27	MF	USA	Dario Brose

== Club ==
=== Management ===
Position	Staff
General Manager	(United States) Tom Neale
Head Coach	(Canada) Frank Yallop
Assistant Coach	(United States) Dominic Kinnear
Goalkeeper Coach	(New Zealand) Tim Hanely
Head trainer	(United States) Bruce Morgan
Equipment manager	(El Salvador) Jose Vega

Last updated: April 18, 2009
Source: San Jose Earthquakes

=== Other information ===
Owner	(United States) Earthquakes Soccer, LLC
Ground (capacity and dimensions)	Spartan Stadium (26,525 / 71x110 yards)

Source: San Jose Earthquakes

== Competitions ==
=== Major League Soccer ===
==== Matches ====
April 7, 2001	Los Angeles Galaxy	2–3	San Jose Earthquakes	Pasadena, California
	Victorine 80'; Frye 83'	Report	Dayak 9'; Cerritos 24'; De Rosario 27'	Stadium: Rose Bowl; Attendance: 17,386

April 14, 2001	San Jose Earthquakes	0–1	Dallas Burn	San Jose, California
		Report	Rhine 19'	Stadium: Spartan Stadium; Attendance: 13,919

April 21, 2001	Miami Fusion	2–1	San Jose Earthquakes	Fort Lauderdale, Florida
	own goal 39'; Pineda Chacón 45'	Report	Russell 51'	Stadium: Lockhart Stadium; Attendance: 8,096

April 28, 2001	Kansas City Wizards	0–0 (OT)	San Jose Earthquakes	Kansas City, Missouri
		Report		Stadium: Arrowhead Stadium; Attendance: 14,521

May 5, 2001	San Jose Earthquakes	3–2	New England Revolution	San Jose, California
	Dayak 28'; De Rosario 72'; Ibsen 80'	Report	Wright 88' own goal 90'	Stadium: Spartan Stadium; Attendance: 8,137

May 12, 2001	D.C. United	2–3	San Jose Earthquakes	Washington, D.C.
	Denton 48'; Moreno 52'	Report	Russell 36'; Lagos 54'; Lagos 91'	Stadium: RFK Stadium; Attendance: 36,528

May 19, 2001	San Jose Earthquakes	2–0	MetroStars	San Jose, California
	Barrett 26'; Donovan 84'	Report		Stadium: Spartan Stadium; Attendance: 6,879

May 23, 2001	Dallas Burn	0–2	San Jose Earthquakes	Dallas, Texas
		Report	Cerritos 15'; De Rosario 92'	Stadium: Cotton Bowl; Attendance: 7,505

May 26, 2001	Chicago Fire	1–1 (OT)	San Jose Earthquakes	Chicago
	Lewis 56'	Report	Ibsen 90'	Stadium: Soldier Field; Attendance: 8,322

May 30, 2001	San Jose Earthquakes	1–1 (OT)	Colorado Rapids	San Jose, California
	Cerritos 40'	Report	Spencer 77'	Stadium: Spartan Stadium; Attendance: 15,217

June 2, 2001	Colorado Rapids	1–2	San Jose Earthquakes	Denver, Colorado
	Spencer 46'	Report	Donovan 12'; Agoos 25'	Stadium: Mile High Stadium; Attendance: 10,095

June 9, 2001	San Jose Earthquakes	3–1	Los Angeles Galaxy	San Jose, California
	Donovan 31'; Russell 55'; Donovan 91'	Report	Victorine 68'	Stadium: Spartan Stadium; Attendance: 13,361

June 16, 2001	MetroStars	0–0 (OT)	San Jose Earthquakes	East Rutherford, New Jersey
		Report		Stadium: Giants Stadium; Attendance: 23,561

June 23, 2001	San Jose Earthquakes	2–0	Kansas City Wizards	San Jose, California
	De Rosario 32'; Cerritos 93'	Report		Stadium: Spartan Stadium; Attendance: 8,917

July 4, 2001	San Jose Earthquakes	1–1 (OT)	Miami Fusion	San Jose, California
	Corrales 57'	Report	Preki 21'	Stadium: Spartan Stadium; Attendance: 9,847

July 7, 2001	Colorado Rapids	3–1	San Jose Earthquakes	Denver, Colorado
	Balboa 6'; Carrieri 21'; Díaz Arce 48'	Report	Cerritos 89'	Stadium: Mile High Stadium; Attendance: 18,047

July 14, 2001	San Jose Earthquakes	2–1	Tampa Bay Mutiny	San Jose, California
	Lagos 4'; Lagos 92'	Report	Diallo 71'	Stadium: Spartan Stadium; Attendance: 7,065

July 18, 2001	San Jose Earthquakes	4–0	D.C. United	San Jose, California
	Lagos 37'; Cerritos 49'; Lagos 53'; Cerritos 56'	Report		Stadium: Spartan Stadium; Attendance: 8,673

July 21, 2001	Columbus Crew	2–1	San Jose Earthquakes	Columbus, Ohio
	Pérez 11'; Elcock 48'	Report	Agoos 44'	Stadium: Columbus Crew Stadium; Attendance: 20,273

August 4, 2001	Tampa Bay Mutiny	2–0	San Jose Earthquakes	Tampa, Florida
	Keller 23'; Pena 35'	Report		Stadium: Raymond James Stadium; Attendance: 11,064

August 8, 2001	New England Revolution	1–5	San Jose Earthquakes	Foxborough, Massachusetts
	Catê 44'	Report	Donovan 35'; Donovan 39'; Agogo 68'; Lagos 71'; Agogo 80'	Stadium: Foxboro Stadium; Attendance: 11,822

August 11, 2001	San Jose Earthquakes	2–2 (OT)	Columbus Crew	San Jose, California
	Cerritos 15'; Cerritos 39'	Report	Cunningham 18'; Warzycha 52'	Stadium: Spartan Stadium; Attendance: 8,119

August 18, 2001	San Jose Earthquakes	0–1	Chicago Fire	San Jose, California
		Report	Marsch 8'	Stadium: Spartan Stadium; Attendance: 10,877

August 25, 2001	San Jose Earthquakes	5–2	Colorado Rapids	San Jose, California
	Agogo 22'; Lagos 36'; Donovan 38'; Agogo 40'; Mulrooney 77'	Report	Carrieri 58' own goal 70'	Stadium: Spartan Stadium; Attendance: 7,312

September 1, 2001	San Jose Earthquakes	3–0	Kansas City Wizards	San Jose, California
	Cerritos 55'; Cerritos 62'; De Rosario 82'	Report		Stadium: Spartan Stadium; Attendance: 6,927

September 8, 2001	Kansas City Wizards	1–0	San Jose Earthquakes	Kansas City, Missouri
	Lassiter 36'	Report		Stadium: Arrowhead Stadium; Attendance: 20,734

(OT) = Overtime

=== MLS Cup Playoffs ===
September 22, 2001 Conference Semifinal	Columbus Crew	1–3	San Jose Earthquakes	Columbus, Ohio
	Warzycha 54'	Report	Donovan 5'; Lagos 31'; Donovan 46'	Stadium: Columbus Crew Stadium; Attendance: 20,883

September 26, 2001 Conference Semifinal	San Jose Earthquakes	3–0	Columbus Crew	San Jose, California
	Lagos 9'; Cerritos 68'; Donovan 76'	Report		Stadium: Spartan Stadium; Attendance: 10,419

October 10, 2001 Conference Final	Miami Fusion	1–0	San Jose Earthquakes	Fort Lauderdale, Florida
	Preki 53'	Report		Stadium: Lockhart Stadium; Attendance: 9,236

October 14, 2001 Conference Final	San Jose Earthquakes	4–0	Miami Fusion	San Jose, California
	Donovan 16'; Russell 57'; Lagos 69'; De Rosario 89'	Report		Stadium: Spartan Stadium; Attendance: 16,119

October 17, 2001 Conference Final	Miami Fusion	0–1 (OT)	San Jose Earthquakes	Fort Lauderdale, Florida
		Report	Dayak 94'	Stadium: Lockhart Stadium; Attendance: 11,242

=== MLS Cup ===
October 21, 2001 MLS Cup	Los Angeles Galaxy	1–2 (OT)	San Jose Earthquakes	Columbus, Ohio
	Hernández 21'	Report	Donovan 43'; De Rosario 96'	Stadium: Columbus Crew Stadium; Attendance: 21,626

=== U.S. Open Cup ===
June 27, 2001 Second Round	Central Coast Roadrunners	0–6	San Jose Earthquakes	Arroyo Grande, California
		Report	De Rosario 52'; Bower 57' 68'; Agogo 70'; Cerritos 85'; Lagos 87'	Stadium: Doug Hitchen Stadium; Attendance: 3,276

July 11, 2001 Third Round	Milwaukee Rampage	0–0 (asdet) (6–7 p)	San Jose Earthquakes	Franklin, Wisconsin
		Report		Stadium: Milwaukee Sports Complex; Attendance: 5,217
	Penalties
	Soso (penalty scored); Hayes (penalty scored); Bernal (penalty scored); Stockton (penalty missed); Henning (penalty scored); Prince (penalty scored); Godoy (penalty scored); Fideski (penalty missed)		(penalty missed) Corrales; (penalty scored) Donovan; (penalty scored) Lagos; (penalty scored) Agogo; (penalty scored) Ekelund; (penalty scored) Ibsen; (penalty scored) Dayak; (penalty scored) Bower

July 24, 2001 Quarterfinal	San Jose Earthquakes	1–1 (asdet) (9–10 p)	Los Angeles Galaxy	San Francisco, California
	Agogo 81'	Report	Elliott 73'	Stadium: Negoesco Stadium; Attendance: 1,881
	Penalties
	Agoos (penalty scored); Lagos (penalty scored); Corrales (penalty scored); Cerritos (penalty scored); De Rosario (penalty scored); Agogo (penalty scored); Ibsen (penalty scored); Russell (penalty scored); Conrad (penalty scored); Barrett (penalty missed)		(penalty scored) Vanney; (penalty scored) Vagenas; (penalty scored) Elliott; (penalty scored) Cienfuegos; (penalty scored) Hendrickson; (penalty scored) Waibel; (penalty scored) Caligiuri; (penalty scored) Jones; (penalty scored) Bardales; (penalty scored) Califf

==== Standings ====
Western Division	GP*	W	L	D	GF	GA	GD	Pts
x – Los Angeles Galaxy	26	14	7	5	52	36	16	47
x – San Jose Earthquakes	26	13	7	6	47	29	18	45
x – Kansas City Wizards	27	11	13	3	33	53	-20	36
Colorado Rapids	26	5	13	8	36	47	-11	23

- Top eight teams with the highest points clinch play-off berth, regardless of division.
  s = Supporters Shield
  x = Clinched playoff berth
- Columbus Crew wins first tiebreaker with San Jose Earthquakes (1-0-1 in head-to-head competition)
- GP* (Games Played) = Season shorten due to 9/11 attacks.
