= Eddie Robinson (soccer) =

American soccer player (born 1978)

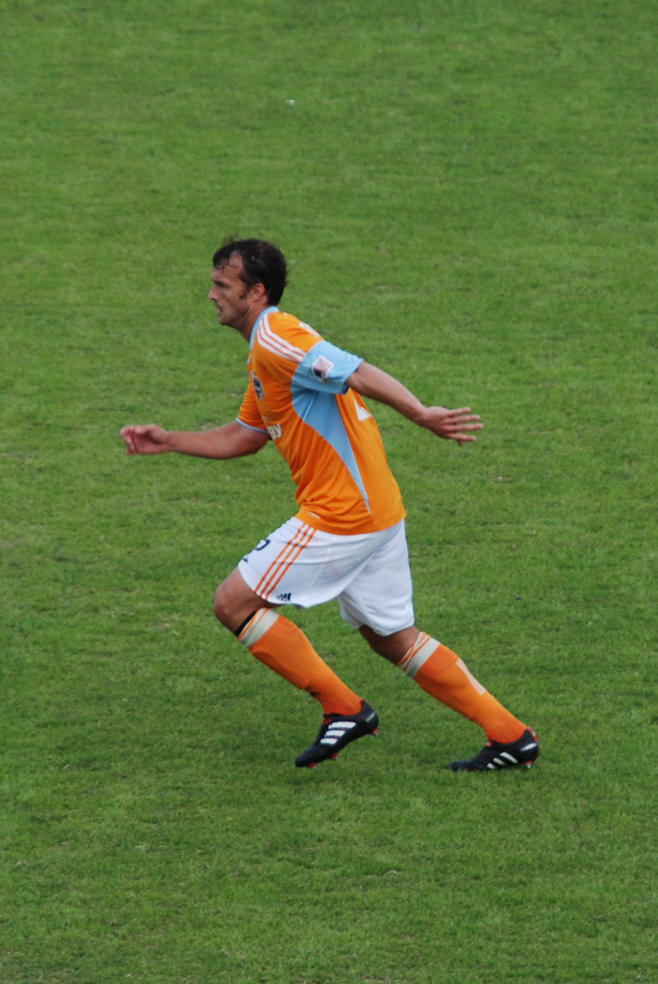

Personal information
- Date of birth: June 19, 1978 (age 48)
- Place of birth: Orlando, Florida, United States
- Height: 6 ft 1 in (1.85 m)
- Position: Defender

College career
Years	Team	Apps	(Gls)
1996–2000	North Carolina Tar Heels	73	(4)

Senior career*
Years	Team	Apps	(Gls)
2001–2005	San Jose Earthquakes	70	(4)
2006–2011	Houston Dynamo	96	(5)
Total		166	(9)

International career
2008	United States	1	(1)
- * Club domestic league appearances and goals

Eddie Robinson (born June 19, 1978) is an American retired soccer player who played as a center-back. During his playing career, he played in Major League Soccer for the San Jose Earthquakes and the Houston Dynamo. He also earned one cap for the United States national soccer team. Robinson now serves as a color commentator for Dynamo TV broadcasts.

== Youth and college ==
Born in Orlando, Florida, Robinson grew up in Greensboro, North Carolina. He began playing soccer at the age of 5. He played high school soccer at Walter Hines Page Senior High School, where as a senior he was named an NSCAA-Umbro All-American as well as earning All-State and All-South honors. Robinson played college soccer at the University of North Carolina from 1996 to 2000, finishing his career with four goals and eight assists in 73 games. While at UNC, Robinson helped lead the Tar Heels to a 2000 ACC Men's Soccer Tournament championship and earned second team All-ACC selection in 2000.

== Club career ==
=== San Jose Earthquakes ===
Robinson was selected with the 8th pick of the 2nd round (20th overall) in the 2001 MLS SuperDraft by the San Jose Earthquakes. He made his professional debut on April 21, getting the start in a 2–1 loss to the Miami Fusion. He would make 3 appearances in the U.S. Open Cup that season, but did not make another league appearance. Although Robinson did not make an appearance in the playoffs, the Earthquakes would win MLS Cup 2001.

The 2002 seasons saw Robinson establish himself in the team. He made his first appearance of the season on April 17, coming on as a substitute in a 3–0 loss to C.F. Pachuca in a CONCACAF Champions Cup match. He would make his first MLS appearance of the year three days later, coming off the bench in a 2–0 win over the Colorado Rapids. During a U.S. Open Cup match on July 17, Robinson would pick up his first career red card after his elbow made contact with Andrew Gregor's jaw. The Earthquakes would go on to defeat the Seattle Sounders 4–3 in extra time. He scored his first career goal on July 27 in a 2–1 loss to the Kansas City Wizards. He would score again on September 7, this time in a 4–3 win over the Columbus Crew. Robinson made 19 appearances during the regular season, helping San Jose finish 2nd in the Western Conference and allow the second fewest goals in the MLS. Robinson would play 90 minutes in both of San Jose's playoff games against the Crew, but the Earthquakes lost each game by the score of 2–1.

Robinson and the Earthquakes opened the 2003 season on March 16, losing 4–2 to C.S.D. Municipal in the Champions Cup. Robinson would miss the return leg due to a right hamstring strain, an injury that would keep him out for the first 6 MLS games of the year. He would return on May 31, but left the game after 37 minutes after re-injuring his hamstring. He returned on July 5 and played the full game in a 0–0 draw with the Chicago Fire. Robinson scored his first and only goal of the season September 20, helping San Jose to a 4–1 win over Kansas City. He then suffered a MCL sprain in his left knee that forced him to miss the final 5 games of the regular season. Despite being without Robinson for much of the season, the Earthquakes finished first in the Western Conference and second overall in the league. The 35 goals allowed tied with the LA Galaxy for fewest in the league. Robinson would miss the first game of the playoffs, a 2–0 loss to the Galaxy. He returned for leg 2 and helped the Earthquakes win 5-2 and advance to the Conference Final. Robinson once again played the whole game as San Jose defeated the Wizards 3–2 to return to MLS Cup. In the final, Robinson helped the Earthquakes defeat the Chicago Fire 4-2 and win their second ever MLS Cup.

On April 24, 2004, In the 4th game of the 2004 season, Robinson was subbed off in the first half after rupturing a tendon in his left hamstring. He underwent surgery on April 29. Robinson returned to the field on August 24, coming on as a sub in a 1–0 loss to the Kansas City Wizards in a U.S. Open Cup match. He would leave the game on October 2 after suffering a left knee sprain, forcing him out for the final two games of the regular season. The Earthquakes finished as the 4 seed in the Western Conference, making the playoffs by just 2 points. Robinson would miss the first game of the playoffs, a 2–0 win over Kansas City. He came on as a substitute in the second leg, but the Wizards would prevail 3–0, eliminating the Earthquakes by an aggregate score of 3–2.

Robinson enjoyed a healthy season in 2005 and cemented himself as a starter. He scored his only goal of the season on July 9 to help San Jose to a 2–1 win over the Columbus Crew. The only three games Robinson missed during the season were due to red cards and yellow card accumulation. He set a career high with 29 games and 2450 minutes played, both MLS regular season only. Robinson formed a strong partnership with Danny Califf as they anchored an Earthquakes defense that allowed a league low 31 goals. Robinson helped the Earthquakes end the year with the top overall seed in MLS and win the 2005 Supporters' Shield. However, San Jose would lose in the first round of the playoffs to the LA Galaxy 4–2 on aggregate, with Robinson playing every minute of both games.

=== Houston Dynamo ===
The San Jose franchise and players moved to Houston ahead of the 2006 season and rebranded as the Houston Dynamo. Robinson suffered a torn ligament in his right leg during preseason that forced him to miss the season opener. He made his Dynamo debut on April 8, coming on as a substitute in a 2–1 loss to the Kansas City Wizards. Robinson scored his first goal for Houston on June 3, scoring off a Brad Davis corner kick in the 85th minute to give Houston a 2–1 win over the LA Galaxy. He would score again on July 15, helping the Dynamo to a 3–2 win over the Wizards. On August 2, Robinson would score in a 4–2 win over the Carolina Dynamo in the U.S. Open Cup. Robinson was selected to the 2006 MLS All-Star Game and played the second half of a 1–0 win over Chelsea. He would score again for the Dynamo on August 23 in a 3–0 win over FC Dallas in U.S. Open Cup Quarterfinals. Robinson helped the Dynamo finish as a 2 seed in the Western Conference. As a result of his good performances, he was named the Dynamo Defensive Player of the Year. During leg 2 of the Conference Semifinals, Robinson set up Brian Ching in the 92nd minute to give the Dynamo a 3–2 lead on aggregate over Chivas USA. After defeating the Colorado Rapids 3–1 in the Conference Final, the Dynamo faced off with the New England Revolution in MLS Cup 2006. Robinson and the Dynamo held the Revs to only one goal, but could only score one goal themselves. Houston would come through during the penalty shoutout 4–3, winning Houston's first MLS Cup. Robinson played every minute of the Dynamo's playoff run.

Robinson and the Dynamo opened their 2007 on February 21 with a 1–0 loss at Puntarenas F.C. in the CONCACAF Champions Cup quarterfinals. During the match, Robinson was sent off for his second yellow card. The Dynamo would win the second leg 2–0. With Robinson back in the lineup, Houston defeated C.F. Pachuca 2–0 in leg 1 of the semifinals. However they would lose 5–2 in extra time to lose by an aggregate score of 5–4. Robinson started the first 12 MLS games of the year for the Dynamo before missing a game on June 24 due to a hamstring injury. He returned on June 30 in a 0–0 draw against FC Dallas, but was then forced to miss a game due to yellow card accumulation. He would again be suspended for 1 match due to yellow card accumulation after picking up a card in a 1–0 win against Dallas on August 19. During the North American SuperLiga, Robinson started every match of the tournament. During the semifinal, Robinson headed in a Richard Mulrooney free kick to level the score at 2 in the 82nd minute. However, C.F. Pachuca would go on to beat Houston 4–3 on penalties. On September 8, Robinson scored his first league goal of the season when he got on the end of a free kick by Mulrooney in a 4–3 win over Real Salt Lake. Mulrooney assisted Robinson again on September 3–0, this time from a corner kick, in a 3–0 win over FC Dallas. Robinson would miss the final match of the regular season after picking up a red card in the previous game. Houston ended the regular season as a 2 seed, in large part due to a Robinson led Dynamo defense that allowed a league low 23 goals, setting a then MLS single season record for fewest goals in a season. Robinson was honored for his performance by being named to the 2007 MLS Best XI and finished runner up for the MLS Defender of the Year Award, losing out to Michael Parkhurst He was also named the Dynamo Defensive Player of the Year for the second straight season. Robinson once again played every minute of the Dynamo's playoff run that saw them defeat FC Dallas and the Kansas City Wizards to return to MLS Cup, facing off with the New England Revolution for the second straight year. Robinson and the Dynamo once again came out victorious, this time by a score of 2–1, becoming the first team in 10 years to win back-to-back MLS Cups.

Robinson and the Dynamo began the 2008 season on March 12, getting a 0–0 draw at C.S.D. Municipal in leg 1 of the 2008 CONCACAF Champions Cup. They would win the return leg 3–1. Robinson played in leg 1 of the semifinal, helping the Dynamo to a 0–0 draw with Deportivo Saprissa, but missed the second leg on April 9 due to an injury. Without Robinson, Houston lost 3–0. He returned to the field on April 12, helping the Dynamo to a 0–0 draw at Kansas City. Although he received no card during the match, the league disciplinary committee suspended Robinson for 3 matches after Robinson elbowed Wizards defender Tyson Wahl in the face during a corner kick. Robinson returned from his suspension on May 10 in a 2–1 win over the Colorado Rapids. On May 28, Dallas midfielder Marcelo Saragosa committed an offensive foul against Robinson, who retaliated by shoving Saragosa to the ground. Both were shown yellow cards and Robinson was ejected due to it being his second yellow of the game. After the initial incident, Dallas midfielder André Rocha confronted Robinson and was shown a straight red card after making contact with Robinson's face. Later the MLS disciplinary committee suspended Robinson for an additional game after deeming Robinson retaliated against Rocha. Robinson appealed the additional suspension, claiming he never touched Rocha, but the suspension was upheld. The game would end in a 2–2 draw. On June 21, Robinson was subbed off during the first half after picking up an ankle sprain, forcing him to miss 2 MLS games and the first two games of the 2008 SuperLiga. He returned from injury on July 19, playing 64 minutes in a 3–1 win over D.C. United, helping the Dynamo advance out of the SuperLiga group stage. On July 23, facing D.C. United again, this time in MLS action, Robinson suffered a left hamstring strain The injury forced him to miss the semifinal and final of the SuperLiga, where the New England Revolution would get revenge on the Dynamo for the 2006 and 2007 MLS Cup results, beating Houston 6–5 on penalties. Robinson returned to action on August 16, playing 90 minutes in a 4–3 win over Real Salt Lake. The Dynamo finished the season as the 1 seed in the Western Conference, thanks in part to a defense that allowed a league low 32 goals. The Dynamo experienced a disappointing playoffs however, losing to the New York Red Bulls 4–1 on aggregate in the first round, with Robinson playing every minute of the series.

The Dynamo began the 2009 season February 24 with a 1–1 draw against Atlante F.C. in leg 1 of the 2008–09 CONCACAF Champions League quarterfinals, however Robinson missed the match due a red card in the final game of the group stage on November 26, 2008. On March 2, 2009, the day before the second leg with Atlante, Robinson underwent knee surgery. On September 22, he returned to the field after being injured for over 6 months, scoring the opening goal in a 5–1 win over C.D. Árabe Unido in the 2009–10 CONCACAF Champions League group stage. He made his only regular season appearance on October 25, coming on as a substitute in a 3–2 win over Chivas USA. Despite being without Robinson for much of the year, the Dynamo still finished as the 2nd seed in the west, losing out on top spot to the LA Galaxy due to head-to-head record. Robinson did not play in either leg of the Conference Semifinals, where the Dynamo defeated Seattle Sounders FC 1–0 in extra time of leg 2. In the conference final, Robinson came on as a substitute, but the Dynamo would lose 2–0 to the Galaxy in extra time.

Ahead of the 2010 season Robinson signed a new contract with the Dynamo. On March 27, Robinson and the Dynamo opened the 2010 season with a 1–1 draw with FC Dallas, Robinson was subbed off after suffering a left hamstring strain. However, he missed only one game and returned to the field on April 10, a 2–1 loss to the Galaxy. On May 29, Robinson scored his only goal of the season and his first MLS goal since 2007 in a 3–2 loss to the Philadelphia Union. Despite a healthy season that saw Robinson play 23 of the 30 league games, the season was a disappointment for Houston, who missed out on the playoffs after finishing 7th in the Western Conference. The Dynamo allowed 49 goals in 2010, tied for second most in the league.

After the 2010 season, the Dynamo declined the contract option for Robinson, but worked out a new contract for 2011. He made his first appearance of the season on April 6 in a 1–0 loss to Sporting Kansas City in a U.S. Open Cup qualifier. Robinson was healthy for most of the year, but struggled to get playing time with Bobby Boswell, André Hainault, and Jermaine Taylor ahead of him on the center back depth chart. He would only make 2 league appearances all season, but still held a leadership role in the locker room. The Dynamo would make a run to MLS Cup 2011, where Houston lost 1–0 to the Galaxy, however Robinson did not appear in any games.

At the end of the 2011 season, the club declined Robinson's 2012 contract option and he entered the 2011 MLS Re-Entry Draft. Robinson was not selected in the draft and became a free agent. He announced his retirement at the age of 33 on January 11, 2012.

== Style of play ==
Robinson was known for his tough, physical, and aggressive play, aiming to intimidate opposition forwards. This led to him committing many fouls, sometimes resulting in yellow and red cards. He led the MLS in yellow cards for the 2006 and 2007 seasons. He holds the Dynamo franchise record for most red cards across all competitions.

== International career ==
Robinson was first called into camp for the United States national team in November 2002, but he did not play in the friendly against El Salvador. He was called back into camp in December 2006, ahead of friendlies against Denmark and Mexico, however he did not see the field in either game. On January 19, 2008, Robinson earned his first cap the friendly against Sweden. The game also saw him score his first international goal in the 2–0 victory. He was called into camp again ahead of a friendly against Mexico on February 6, but he did not make the match day squad.

== Career statistics ==
=== Club ===
Club	Season	League			Playoffs		Open Cup		CONCACAF		Total	
Club	Season	Division	Apps	Goals	Apps	Goals	Apps	Goals	Apps	Goals	Apps	Goals
San Jose Earthquakes	2001	MLS	1	0	0	0	3	0	—		4	0
San Jose Earthquakes	2002	MLS	19	2	2	0	1	0	2 (Note: Appearances in CONCACAF Champions League)	0	24	2
San Jose Earthquakes	2003	MLS	13	1	3	0	1	0	1	0	18	1
San Jose Earthquakes	2004	MLS	8	0	1	0	1	0	0	0	10	0
San Jose Earthquakes	2005	MLS	29	1	2	0	2	0	—		33	1
San Jose Earthquakes	Earthquakes Total		70	4	8	0	8	0	3	0	89	4
Houston Dynamo	2006	MLS	25	2	4	0	3	2	—		32	4
Houston Dynamo	2007	MLS	25	2	4	0	1	0	7 (Note: Three appearances in CONCACAF Champions League, four appearances and one goal in North American SuperLiga)	1	37	3
Houston Dynamo	2008	MLS	20	0	2	0	0	0	7 (Note: Six appearances in CONCACAF Champions League, one appearance in North American SuperLiga)	0	29	0
Houston Dynamo	2009	MLS	1	0	1	0	0	0	3	1	5	1
Houston Dynamo	2010	MLS	23	1	—		2	0	3 (Note: Appearances in North American SuperLiga)	0	28	1
Houston Dynamo	2011	MLS	2	0	0	0	1	0	—		3	0
Houston Dynamo	Dynamo Total		96	5	11	0	7	2	20	2	134	9
Career total			166	9	19	0	15	2	23	2	223	13

=== International Goals ===
#	Date	Venue	Opponent	Score	Result	Competition
1.	January 19, 2008	Home Depot Center, California, United States	Sweden	1-0	2-0	Friendly

== Honors ==
San Jose Earthquakes

- Major League Soccer MLS Cup: 2001, 2003
- Major League Soccer Supporters' Shield: 2005
- Major League Soccer Western Conference Championship: 2001, 2003

Houston Dynamo

- Major League Soccer MLS Cup: 2006, 2007
- Major League Soccer Western Conference Championship: 2006, 2007
- Major League Soccer Eastern Conference Championship: 2011

Individual

- MLS All-Star: 2006
- MLS Best XI: 2007
- Dynamo Defensive Player of the year: 2006, 2007
- North Carolina Soccer Hall of Fame: 2013

== Post-playing career ==
Upon his retirement as a player, Robinson worked with the Dynamo Academy as a coach. He also has worked as a color commentator for local TV broadcasts of Dynamo games since 2012. From 2018 to 2019, he had worked as an assistant coach for the Houston Dash of the NWSL.

== Personal life ==
Robinson lives in Pearland, Texas, a suburb of Houston. He enjoys playing golf and cooking.
