= 2006 MLS All-Star Game =

Soccer game played in Bridgeview, Illinois

Sierra Mist MLS All-Star Game 2006
- Event: 2006 Major League Soccer season
MLS All-Stars	Chelsea
(United States)	(England)
1	0
- Date: August 5, 2006
- Venue: Toyota Park, Bridgeview, Illinois
- Man of the Match: Dwayne De Rosario (MLS All-Stars)
- Referee: Abiodun Okulaja
- Attendance: 21,210
- Weather: Cloudy, 85°F

The 2006 Major League Soccer All-Star Game was the 11th Major League Soccer All-Star Game, played on August 5, 2006, at Toyota Park in Bridgeview, Illinois between the MLS All-Stars and Chelsea. The MLS All-Stars won the match 1–0, with Dwayne De Rosario scoring the winning goal in the 70th minute. The Coach of MLS All-Stars have chosen to start the game with players mostly from his team D.C. United and left stars like Freddy Adu on bench even though he was expected to put them in starting 11. On the interview in Polish YouTube channel “Kanal Sportowy” Peter Nowak admitted that he said to his superiors if they want to win the game they have to allow him to use his own players from D.C. United, which they did and won.

== Match details ==
2006 MLS All-Star Game
August 5, 2006
18:30 ET

MLS All-Stars (United States)	1–0	(England) Chelsea
De Rosario 70'	Report

Toyota Park, Bridgeview, IL
Attendance: 21,210
Referee: Abiodun Okulaja

MLS All-Stars	Chelsea

GK	1	(United States) Troy Perkins	(substituted off) 46'
RB	32	(United States) Bobby Boswell
CB	4	(Argentina) Facundo Erpen
CB	12	(United States) Jimmy Conrad	(substituted off) 46'
LB	5	(United States) Chris Albright	(substituted off) 46'
RM	14	(Canada) Dwayne De Rosario
CM	13	(Argentina) Christian Gómez	(substituted off) 46'
CM	8	(United States) Richard Mulrooney	(substituted off) 46'
LM	17	(United States) Joshua Gros
CF	15	(United States) Brian Ching	(substituted off) 46'
CF	99	(Bolivia) Jaime Moreno (c)	(substituted off) 46'
Substitutes:
GK	22	(United States) Joe Cannon	(substituted on) 46'
DF	2	(United States) Eddie Robinson	(substituted on) 46'
DF	6	(Republic of Ireland) Ronnie O'Brien	(substituted on) 46'
MF	9	(United States) Freddy Adu	(substituted on) 46'
MF	26	(United States) Ricardo Clark	(substituted on) 46'
FW		(United States) Nate Jaqua	(substituted on) 46'
FW	11	(United States) Alecko Eskandarian	(substituted on) 46'
Coach:
(Poland) Peter Nowak

GK	23	(Italy) Carlo Cudicini	(substituted off) 64'
RB	14	(Cameroon) Geremi
CB	20	(Portugal) Paulo Ferreira	(substituted off) 46'
CB	26	(England) John Terry (c)
LB	18	(England) Wayne Bridge	(substituted off) 46'
DM	5	(Ghana) Michael Essien
CM	13	(Germany) Michael Ballack	(substituted off) 46'
CM	8	(England) Frank Lampard
RW	24	(England) Shaun Wright-Phillips	(substituted off) 46'
LW	11	(Ivory Coast) Didier Drogba	(substituted off) 46'
CF	7	(Ukraine) Andriy Shevchenko	(substituted off) 46'
Substitutes:
GK	40	(Portugal) Hilário	(substituted on) 64'
DF	6	(Portugal) Ricardo Carvalho	(substituted on) 46'
DF	43	(England) Ryan Bertrand
DF	44	(England) Michael Mancienne
MF	10	(England) Joe Cole	(substituted on) 46'	(substituted off) 52'
MF	12	(Nigeria) Mikel John Obi	(substituted on) 46'
MF	16	(Netherlands) Arjen Robben	(substituted on) 46'
MF	19	(France) Lassana Diarra	(substituted on) 46'
MF	46	(England) Jimmy Smith	(substituted on) 52'
MF	48	(England) Michael Woods
FW	21	(Ivory Coast) Salomon Kalou	(substituted on) 46'
Coach:
(Portugal) José Mourinho

Most Valuable Player:
(Canada) Dwayne De Rosario

Assistant referees:
Nate Clement
Chris Strickland
Fourth official:
Terry Vaughn

Several players originally named in the MLS All-Stars roster had to withdraw as they were due to play in the New England Revolution vs Chivas USA match on August 6; these included Ante Razov (Chivas), Shalrie Joseph and Clint Dempsey (both New England). Landon Donovan, Pablo Mastroeni and Eddie Pope also withdrew from the All-Star game through injury. Facundo Erpen, Ricardo Clark and Eddie Robinson were called up to replace them.
