= 2002 San Jose Earthquakes season =

San Jose Earthquakes
2002 season
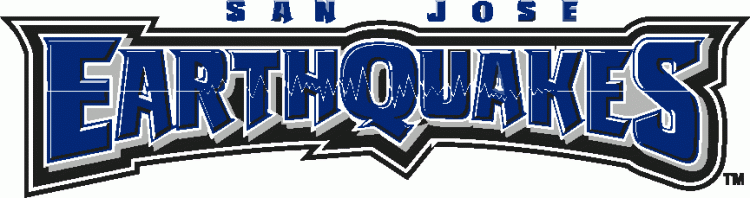
- Owner: AEG
- Coach: Frank Yallop
- Stadium: Spartan Stadium
- Major League Soccer: Conference: 2nd Overall: 2nd
- MLS Cup: Conference Semifinals
- U.S. Open Cup: Quarterfinals
- CONCACAF: Quarterfinals
- California Clásico: 2nd
- Top goalscorer: Ariel Graziani (14)
- Average home league attendance: 9,610
Home colors	Away colors

The 2002 San Jose Earthquakes season was the seventh season of the team's existence.

== Squad ==
=== Current squad ===
As of August 18, 2009. Note: Flags indicate national team as defined under FIFA eligibility rules; some limited exceptions apply. Players may hold more than one non-FIFA nationality.

No.	Pos.	Nation	Player
1	GK	USA	Joe Cannon
2	DF	USA	Eddie Robinson
4	MF	USA	Chris Roner
5	MF	USA	Ramiro Corrales
6	FW	DEN	Ronnie Ekelund
7	MF	USA	Ian Russell
8	DF	USA	Richard Mulrooney
9	MF	USA	Scott Bower
10	FW	USA	Landon Donovan
11	MF	USA	Manny Lagos

No.	Pos.	Nation	Player
12	DF	USA	Jeff Agoos
13	FW	USA	Devin Barclay
14	MF	CAN	Dwayne De Rosario
15	FW	USA	Luchi Gonzalez
17	DF	USA	Jimmy Conrad
18	GK	USA	Jon Conway
19	DF	USA	Troy Dayak
20	FW	ECU	Ariel Graziani
22	DF	USA	Zak Ibsen
24	DF	USA	Wade Barrett

== Club ==
=== Management ===
Position	Staff
General Manager	(United States) Tom Neale
Head Coach	(Canada) Frank Yallop
Assistant Coach	(United States) Dominic Kinnear
Goalkeeper Coach	(New Zealand) Tim Hanely
Head trainer	(United States) Bruce Morgan
Equipment manager	(El Salvador) Jose Vega

Last updated: April 18, 2009
Source: San Jose Earthquakes

=== Other information ===
Owner	(United States) Earthquakes Soccer, LLC
Ground (capacity and dimensions)	Spartan Stadium (26,525 / 71x110 yards)

Source: San Jose Earthquakes

== Competitions ==
=== Major League Soccer ===
==== Standings ====
===== Conference =====
Pos	Team	Pld	W	L	T	GF	GA	GD	Pts	Qualification
1	Los Angeles Galaxy	28	16	9	3	44	33	+11	51	MLS Cup Playoffs
2	San Jose Earthquakes	28	14	11	3	45	35	+10	45	MLS Cup Playoffs
3	Dallas Burn	28	12	9	7	44	43	+1	43	MLS Cup Playoffs
4	Colorado Rapids	28	13	11	4	43	48	−5	43	MLS Cup Playoffs
5	Kansas City Wizards	28	9	10	9	37	45	−8	36	MLS Cup Playoffs

Source: MLS

===== Overall =====
Pos	Team	Pld	W	L	T	GF	GA	GD	Pts	Qualification
1	Los Angeles Galaxy (C, S)	28	16	9	3	44	33	+11	51	CONCACAF Champions' Cup
2	San Jose Earthquakes	28	14	11	3	45	35	+10	45	CONCACAF Champions' Cup
3	Dallas Burn	28	12	9	7	44	43	+1	43	
4	Colorado Rapids	28	13	11	4	43	48	−5	43	
5	New England Revolution	28	12	14	2	49	49	0	38	CONCACAF Champions' Cup
6	Columbus Crew	28	11	12	5	44	43	+1	38	CONCACAF Champions' Cup
7	Chicago Fire	28	11	13	4	43	38	+5	37	
8	Kansas City Wizards	28	9	10	9	37	45	−8	36	
9	MetroStars	28	11	15	2	41	47	−6	35	
10	D.C. United	28	9	14	5	31	40	−9	32	

Source: MLS
Rules for classification: 1) points; 2) head-to-head record; 3) goal difference; 4) number of goals scored
(C) Champions; (S) Supporters' Shield

==== Matches ====
March 23, 2002	Dallas Burn	0–2	San Jose Earthquakes	Dallas, Texas
			De Rosario 11'; Donovan 46'	Stadium: Cotton Bowl; Attendance: 15,214

March 30, 2002	Colorado Rapids	1–0	San Jose Earthquakes	Denver, Colorado
	Chung 4'	Report		Stadium: Invesco Field; Attendance: 25,010

April 6, 2002	San Jose Earthquakes	2–1	New England Revolution	San Jose, California
	Lagos 2'; Ekelund 78'	Report	Diallo 38'	Stadium: Spartan Stadium; Attendance: 10,104

April 13, 2002	Kansas City Wizards	2–0	San Jose Earthquakes	Kansas City, Missouri
	Klein 52'; Brown 65'	Report		Stadium: Arrowhead Stadium; Attendance: 10,636

April 20, 2002	San Jose Earthquakes	2–0	Colorado Rapids	San Jose, California
	Graziani 26'; Donovan 74'	Report		Stadium: Spartan Stadium; Attendance: 8,188

April 27, 2002	MetroStars	1–1 (OT)	San Jose Earthquakes	East Rutherford, New Jersey
	Mathis 55'	Report	Graziani 72'	Stadium: Giants Stadium; Attendance: 13,339

May 4, 2002	San Jose Earthquakes	3–2	Columbus Crew	San Jose, California
	Barrett 44'; Ekelund 47'; Corrales 90'	Report	Washington 23'; Cunningham 43'	Stadium: Spartan Stadium; Attendance: 6,317

May 11, 2002	San Jose Earthquakes	2–1	MetroStars	San Jose, California
	Graziani 13'; Graziani 43'	Report	Faria 50'	Stadium: Spartan Stadium; Attendance: 8,445

May 18, 2002	Columbus Crew	2–0	San Jose Earthquakes	Columbus, Ohio
	Buddle 49'; Cunningham 76'	Report		Stadium: Columbus Crew Stadium; Attendance: 15,712

May 26, 2002	Chicago Fire	1–1 (OT)	San Jose Earthquakes	Naperville, Illinois
	Gray 10'	Report	Ekelund 60'	Stadium: Cardinal Stadium; Attendance: 13,521

June 1, 2002	New England Revolution	0–2	San Jose Earthquakes	Foxborough, Massachusetts
		Report	Graziani 23'; Graziani 67'	Stadium: Gillette Stadium; Attendance: 21,539

June 8, 2002	San Jose Earthquakes	3–0	Kansas City Wizards	San Jose, California
	Graziani 40'; Graziani 48'; Mulrooney 75'	Report		Stadium: Spartan Stadium; Attendance: 8,043

June 15, 2002	Columbus Crew	2–1	San Jose Earthquakes	Columbus, Ohio
	Cunningham 31'; Washington 83'	Report	De Rosario 39'	Stadium: Columbus Crew Stadium; Attendance: 19,085

June 22, 2002	San Jose Earthquakes	4–0	Colorado Rapids	San Jose, California
	Conrad 5' own goal 63'; Graziani 68' own goal 89'	Report		Stadium: Spartan Stadium; Attendance: 10,431

June 29, 2002	San Jose Earthquakes	2–1	Kansas City Wizards	San Jose, California
	Graziani 85'; Corrales 88'	Report	Fabbro 16'	Stadium: Spartan Stadium; Attendance: 9,008

July 4, 2002	Los Angeles Galaxy	2–1	San Jose Earthquakes	Pasadena, California
	Ruiz 34'; Ruiz 87'	Report	Lagos 30'	Stadium: Rose Bowl; Attendance: 55,234

July 7, 2002	San Jose Earthquakes	1–0	Los Angeles Galaxy	San Jose, California
	Donovan 35'	Report		Stadium: Spartan Stadium; Attendance: 12,528

July 13, 2002	Dallas Burn	2–1	San Jose Earthquakes	Dallas, Texas
	own goal 50'; O'Brien 88'	Report	De Rosario 92'	Stadium: Cotton Bowl; Attendance: 13,035

July 20, 2002	San Jose Earthquakes	4–0	Dallas Burn	San Jose, California
	Graziani 3'; Lagos 28'; De Rosario 42'; Donovan 88'	Report		Stadium: Spartan Stadium; Attendance: 12,616

July 24, 2002	San Jose Earthquakes	1–0	Chicago Fire	San Jose, California
	Graziani 43'	Report		Stadium: Spartan Stadium; Attendance: 9,137

July 27, 2002	Kansas City Wizards	2–1	San Jose Earthquakes	Kansas City, Missouri
	Armstrong 30'; Simutenkov 86'	Report	Robinson 25'	Stadium: Arrowhead Stadium; Attendance: 11,530

August 17, 2002	San Jose Earthquakes	2–2 (OT)	D.C. United	San Jose, California
	Ekelund 17'; Ekelund 63'	Report	Quintanilla 5'; Quintanilla 61'	Stadium: Spartan Stadium; Attendance: 11,177

August 21, 2002	San Jose Earthquakes	3–1	Dallas Burn	San Jose, California
	Graziani 7'; Donovan 33'; Corrales 63'	Report	Rodríguez 43'	Stadium: Spartan Stadium; Attendance: 9,089

August 24, 2002	Colorado Rapids	3–0	San Jose Earthquakes	Denver, Colorado
	Carrieri 8'; Kingsley 67'; Chung 93'	Report		Stadium: Invesco Field; Attendance: 12,196

August 31, 2002	D.C. United	4–2	San Jose Earthquakes	Washington, D.C.
	Convey 38'; Nelsen 74'; Pope 84'; Villegas 86'	Report	Donovan 49'; Donovan 58'	Stadium: RFK Stadium; Attendance: 14,158

September 7, 2002	San Jose Earthquakes	4–3 (OT)	Columbus Crew	San Jose, California
	Robinson 4'; Ekelund 22'; Graziani 53' own goal 97'	Report	Cunningham 28'; Buddle 59'; Buddle 82'	Stadium: Spartan Stadium; Attendance: 14,792

September 14, 2002	Los Angeles Galaxy	1–0	San Jose Earthquakes	Pasadena, California
	Ruiz 94'	Report		Stadium: Rose Bowl; Attendance: 32,874

September 21, 2002	San Jose Earthquakes	0–1	Los Angeles Galaxy	San Jose, California
		Report	Ruiz 94'	Stadium: Spartan Stadium; Attendance: 26,229

(OT) = Overtime

=== MLS Cup Playoffs ===
September 25, 2002 Conference Semifinal	San Jose Earthquakes	1–2	Columbus Crew	San Jose, California
	Donovan 54'	Report	Buddle 38'; García 81'	Stadium: Spartan Stadium; Attendance: 8,069

September 28, 2002 Conference Semifinal	Columbus Crew	2–1 (4–2 agg.)	San Jose Earthquakes	Columbus, Ohio
	García 50'; McBride 81'	Report	Graziani 58'	Stadium: Columbus Crew Stadium; Attendance: 13,004

=== U.S. Open Cup ===
July 17, 2002 Third round	Seattle Sounders	3–4 (asdet)	San Jose Earthquakes	Seattle, Washington
	Gregor 11'; Jenkins 58'; Ching 60'	Report	Ekelund 30'; De Rosario 39'; Ekelund 78'; Graziani 120'	Stadium: Interbay Stadium; Attendance: 1,275

August 7, 2002 Quarterfinal	San Jose Earthquakes	0–1 (asdet)	Los Angeles Galaxy	San Jose, California
		Report	Ruiz 101'	Stadium: Spartan Stadium; Attendance: 6,481

=== CONCACAF Champions Cup ===
March 13, 2002 First round	Olimpia (Honduras)	0–1	(United States) San Jose Earthquakes	Miami, Florida, United States
		Report	Mulrooney 74'	Stadium: Orange Bowl; Attendance: 4,318

March 16, 2002 First round	San Jose Earthquakes (United States)	3–1 (4–1 agg.)	(Honduras) Olimpia	Sacramento, California, United States
	Donovan 33'; Russell 40'; Agoos 66'	Report	Costa 87'	Stadium: Sheldon Florin Community Stadium; Attendance: 3,300

April 17, 2002 Quarterfinal	Pachuca (Mexico)	3–0	(United States) San Jose Earthquakes	Pachuca, Hidalgo, Mexico
	Garces 10'; Santana 54'; Arango 81'	Report		Stadium: Estadio Hidalgo; Attendance: 8,000 (est.)

April 24, 2002 Quarterfinal	San Jose Earthquakes (United States)	1–0 (1–3 agg.)	(Mexico) Pachuca	San Jose, California, United States
	Corrales 61'	Report		Stadium: Spartan Stadium; Attendance: 6,213
