= 2004 San Jose Earthquakes season =

San Jose Earthquakes
2004 season
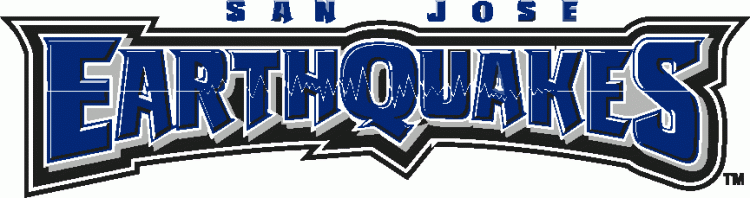
- Owner: AEG
- Coach: Dominic Kinnear
- Stadium: Spartan Stadium
- Major League Soccer: Conference: 4th Overall: 7th
- MLS Cup: Conference Semifinals
- U.S. Open Cup: Semifinals
- CONCACAF: Quarterfinals
- California Clásico: 2nd
- Top goalscorer: Brian Ching (12)
- Average home league attendance: 10,830
Home colors	Away colors

The 2004 San Jose Earthquakes season was the ninth season of the team's existence. It was the first under the guidance of Dominic Kinnear as head coach, following Frank Yallop's departure the previous December to coach the Canadian national team. San Jose Earthquakes selected Ryan Cochrane with the 5th pick in the Major League Soccer Super Draft after acquiring the pick in the Joe Cannon Trade. They also selected Steve Cronin, Mike Wilson, Marin Pusek, and Tighe Dombrowski. Midway through the season, they traded for Wes Hart from the Colorado Rapids and Chris Brown from the New England Revolution to help solidify their playoff run. Troy Dayak and Eddie Robinson missed most of the season due to injuries. They called in Tim Weaver from the San Francisco Bay Seals and Leighton o'Brien for a number of games to fill out their bench. They didn't appear in any games. San Jose finished the last 7 weeks of the season without a win, coming down to the last game of the season against the Dallas Burn needing a tie or a win to advance into the playoffs. They pulled out a 2–2 tie qualifying for the playoffs.

== Squad ==
=== Current squad ===
As of August 18, 2009. Note: Flags indicate national team as defined under FIFA eligibility rules; some limited exceptions apply. Players may hold more than one non-FIFA nationality.

No.	Pos.	Nation	Player
1	GK	USA	Jon Conway
2	DF	USA	Eddie Robinson
4	DF	USA	Chris Roner
5	MF	USA	Ramiro Corrales
6	MF	DEN	Ronnie Ekelund
7	MF	USA	Ian Russell
8	DF	USA	Richard Mulrooney
9	MF	USA	Brian Mullan
10	FW	USA	Landon Donovan
11	FW	ESA	Arturo Alvarez
12	DF	USA	Jeff Agoos
13	FW	USA	Jamil Walker

No.	Pos.	Nation	Player
14	MF	CAN	Dwayne De Rosario
15	FW	USA	Roger Levesque
16	DF	USA	Craig Waibel
17	DF	USA	Todd Dunivant
18	GK	CAN	Pat Onstad
19	DF	USA	Troy Dayak
20	DF	USA	Ryan Cochrane
21	MF	USA	Tighe Dombrowski
22	DF	USA	Wes Hart
23	FW	USA	Chris Brown
24	GK	USA	Steve Cronin
25	FW	USA	Brian Ching

== Club ==
=== Management ===
Position	Staff
General Manager	(United States) Alexi Lalas
Head Coach	(United States) Dominic Kinnear
Assistant Coach	(United States) John Doyle
Goalkeeper Coach	(New Zealand) Tim Hanely
Head trainer	(United States) Bruce Morgan
Equipment manager	(El Salvador) Jose Vega

Last updated: April 18, 2009
Source: San Jose Earthquakes

=== Other information ===
Owner	(United States) AEG
Ground (capacity and dimensions)	Spartan Stadium (26,525 / 71x110 yards)

Source: San Jose Earthquakes

== Competitions ==
=== Major League Soccer ===
==== Standings ====
Pos	Team	Pld	W	L	T	GF	GA	GD	Pts	Qualification
1	Kansas City Wizards	30	14	9	7	38	30	+8	49	MLS Cup Playoffs
2	Los Angeles Galaxy	30	11	9	10	42	40	+2	43	MLS Cup Playoffs
3	Colorado Rapids	30	10	9	11	29	32	−3	41	MLS Cup Playoffs
4	San Jose Earthquakes	30	9	10	11	41	35	+6	38	MLS Cup Playoffs
5	Dallas Burn	30	10	14	6	34	45	−11	36	

Source: MLS

==== Matches ====
April 3, 2004	D.C. United	2–1	San Jose Earthquakes	Washington, D.C.
	Moreno 12'; Eskandarian 39'	Report	Ekelund 19'	Stadium: RFK Stadium; Attendance: 24,603

April 10, 2004	San Jose Earthquakes	0–0	Chicago Fire	San Jose, California
		Report		Stadium: Spartan Stadium; Attendance: 8,230

April 17, 2004	New England Revolution	1–3	San Jose Earthquakes	Foxborough, Massachusetts
	Twellman 49'	Report	De Rosario 53'; Alvarez 55'; Ching 75'	Stadium: Gillette Stadium; Attendance: 16,203

April 24, 2004	Colorado Rapids	1–0	San Jose Earthquakes	Denver
	Henderson 26'	Report		Stadium: Invesco Field; Attendance: 8,425

May 1, 2004	San Jose Earthquakes	1–1	D.C. United	San Jose, California
	Dayak 33'	Report	Kovalenko 66'	Stadium: Spartan Stadium; Attendance: 17,667

May 8, 2004	San Jose Earthquakes	5–5	MetroStars	San Jose, California
	Ching 13'; Brown 24'; Donovan 43'; Ekelund 58'; Waibel 60'	Report	Glen 6'; Vaca 25'; Taylor 45'; Guevara 64'; Glen 90'	Stadium: Spartan Stadium; Attendance: 7,522

May 15, 2004	Dallas Burn	1–2	San Jose Earthquakes	Dallas, Texas
	Johnson 66'	Report	Donovan 13'; Ching 45'	Stadium: Cotton Bowl; Attendance: 8,498

May 22, 2004	San Jose Earthquakes	4–2	Los Angeles Galaxy	San Jose, California
	Ching 45'; Ching 48'; Mullan 54'; De Rosario 79'	Report	Herzog 61'; Ngwenya 74'	Stadium: Spartan Stadium; Attendance: 12,207

May 29, 2004	Columbus Crew	1–0	San Jose Earthquakes	Columbus, Ohio
	Cunningham 69'	Report		Stadium: Columbus Crew Stadium; Attendance: 14,555

June 12, 2004	San Jose Earthquakes	3–1	MetroStars	San Jose, California
	Agoos 27'; Ching 79'; Mullan 89'	Report	Parke 59'	Stadium: Spartan Stadium; Attendance: 9,999

June 19, 2004	Chicago Fire	1–1	San Jose Earthquakes	Chicago
	Jaqua 7'	Report	Ching 66'	Stadium: Soldier Field; Attendance: 13,472

June 26, 2004	San Jose Earthquakes	1–1	Kansas City Wizards	San Jose, California
	Mulrooney 79'	Report	Burciaga 45'	Stadium: Spartan Stadium; Attendance: 10,188

July 4, 2004	Los Angeles Galaxy	2–1	San Jose Earthquakes	Carson, California
	Ruiz 45'; Ruiz 55'	Report	De Rosario 41'	Stadium: Home Depot Center; Attendance: 27,000

July 7, 2004	San Jose Earthquakes	1–2	Dallas Burn	San Jose, California
	Corrales 10'	Report	Quill 6'; Valakari 89'	Stadium: Spartan Stadium; Attendance: 9,350

July 10, 2004	MetroStars	2–0	San Jose Earthquakes	East Rutherford, New Jersey
	Wolyniec 63'; Guevara 90'	Report		Stadium: Giants Stadium; Attendance: 13,174

July 17, 2004	San Jose Earthquakes	3–1	Colorado Rapids	San Jose, California
	Ching 22'; Ching 50'; Donovan 55'	Report	Trembly 83'	Stadium: Spartan Stadium; Attendance: 9,122

July 24, 2004	San Jose Earthquakes	2–2	New England Revolution	San Jose, California
	Ching 90'; Donovan 90'	Report	Noonan 25'; Cancela 54'	Stadium: Spartan Stadium; Attendance: 9,062

August 7, 2004	San Jose Earthquakes	2–0	D.C. United	San Jose, California
	Mullan 17'; De Rosario 82'	Report		Stadium: Spartan Stadium; Attendance: 19,324

August 11, 2004	Chicago Fire	2–1	San Jose Earthquakes	Chicago
	Williams 41'; Ralph 81'	Report	Ekelund 76'	Stadium: Soldier Field; Attendance: 11,307

August 14, 2004	Kansas City Wizards	0–2	San Jose Earthquakes	Kansas City, Missouri
		Report	Donovan 27'; Donovan 59'	Stadium: Arrowhead Stadium; Attendance: 11,545

August 21, 2004	San Jose Earthquakes	3–0	Dallas Burn	San Jose, California
	Corrales 5' own goal 24'; Ching 52'	Report		Stadium: Spartan Stadium; Attendance: 10,020

August 28, 2004	San Jose Earthquakes	0–0	Colorado Rapids	San Jose, California
		Report		Stadium: Spartan Stadium; Attendance: 12,846

September 4, 2004	New England Revolution	0–1	San Jose Earthquakes	Foxborough, Massachusetts
		Report	Brown 48'	Stadium: Gillette Stadium; Attendance: 25,266

September 8, 2004	San Jose Earthquakes	0–1	Columbus Crew	San Jose, California
		Report	Sanneh 90'	Stadium: Spartan Stadium; Attendance: 7,137

September 11, 2004	Los Angeles Galaxy	2–1	San Jose Earthquakes	Carson, California
	Victorine 36'; Torres 75'	Report	Ekelund 77'	Stadium: Home Depot Center; Attendance: 27,000

September 18, 2004	Kansas City Wizards	1–0	San Jose Earthquakes	Kansas City, Missouri
	Gutiérrez 82'	Report		Stadium: Arrowhead Stadium; Attendance: 10,873

September 25, 2004	San Jose Earthquakes	0–0	Los Angeles Galaxy	San Jose, California
		Report		Stadium: Spartan Stadium; Attendance: 27,030

October 2, 2004	Colorado Rapids	1–1	San Jose Earthquakes	Denver
	Peguero 14'	Report	De Rosario 82'	Stadium: Invesco Field; Attendance: 12,323

October 9, 2004	San Jose Earthquakes	0–0	Kansas City Wizards	San Jose, California
		Report		Stadium: Spartan Stadium; Attendance: 25,311

October 16, 2004	Dallas Burn	2–2	San Jose Earthquakes	Dallas, Texas
	Johnson 12'; Pareja 62'	Report	Ching 34'; Corrales 36'	Stadium: Cotton Bowl; Attendance: 10,268

=== MLS Cup Playoffs ===
October 24, 2004 Conference Semifinal	San Jose Earthquakes	2–0	Kansas City Wizards	San Jose, California
	De Rosario 40'; Waibel 52'	Report		Stadium: Spartan Stadium; Attendance: 8,659

October 30, 2004 Conference Semifinal	Kansas City Wizards	3–0 (3–2 agg.)	San Jose Earthquakes	Kansas City, Missouri
	Stephenson 26' own goal 48'; Jewsbury 92'	Report		Stadium: Arrowhead Stadium; Attendance: 10,022

=== U.S. Open Cup ===
July 14, 2004 Fourth round	Portland Timbers	0–3	San Jose Earthquakes	Portland, Oregon
		Report	Ekelund 18'; Corrales 55'; De Rosario 80'	Stadium: PGE Park; Attendance: 10,622

August 4, 2004 Quarterfinal	Minnesota Thunder	2–2 (asdet) (4–5 p)	San Jose Earthquakes	Saint Paul, Minnesota
	Tarley 4'; Branan 77'	Report	Ching 24'; Donovan 63'	Stadium: James Griffin Stadium; Attendance: 5,688
	Penalties
	Menyongar (penalty scored); Albert (penalty missed); Matteo (penalty scored); Branan (penalty scored); Ferruzzi (penalty scored)		(penalty scored) Donovan; (penalty scored) Ching; (penalty scored) Mulrooney; (penalty scored) De Rosario; (penalty scored) Dunivant

August 24, 2004 Semifinal	Kansas City Wizards	1–0	San Jose Earthquakes	Overland Park, Kansas
	Simutenkov 45'	Report		Stadium: Blue Valley Sports Complex; Attendance: 2,162

=== CONCACAF Champions Cup ===
March 17, 2004 Quarterfinal	Alajuelense (Costa Rica)	3–0	(United States) San Jose Earthquakes	Alajuela, Costa Rica
	Scott 11'; Ledezma 14'; Arnaez 62'	Report		Stadium: Estadio Alejandro Morera Soto

March 24, 2004 Quarterfinal	San Jose Earthquakes (United States)	1–0 (1–3 agg.)	(Costa Rica) Alajuelense	San Jose, California, United States
	Mullan 89'	Report		Stadium: Spartan Stadium; Attendance: 5,130
