= Ramiro Corrales =

American soccer player (born 1977)

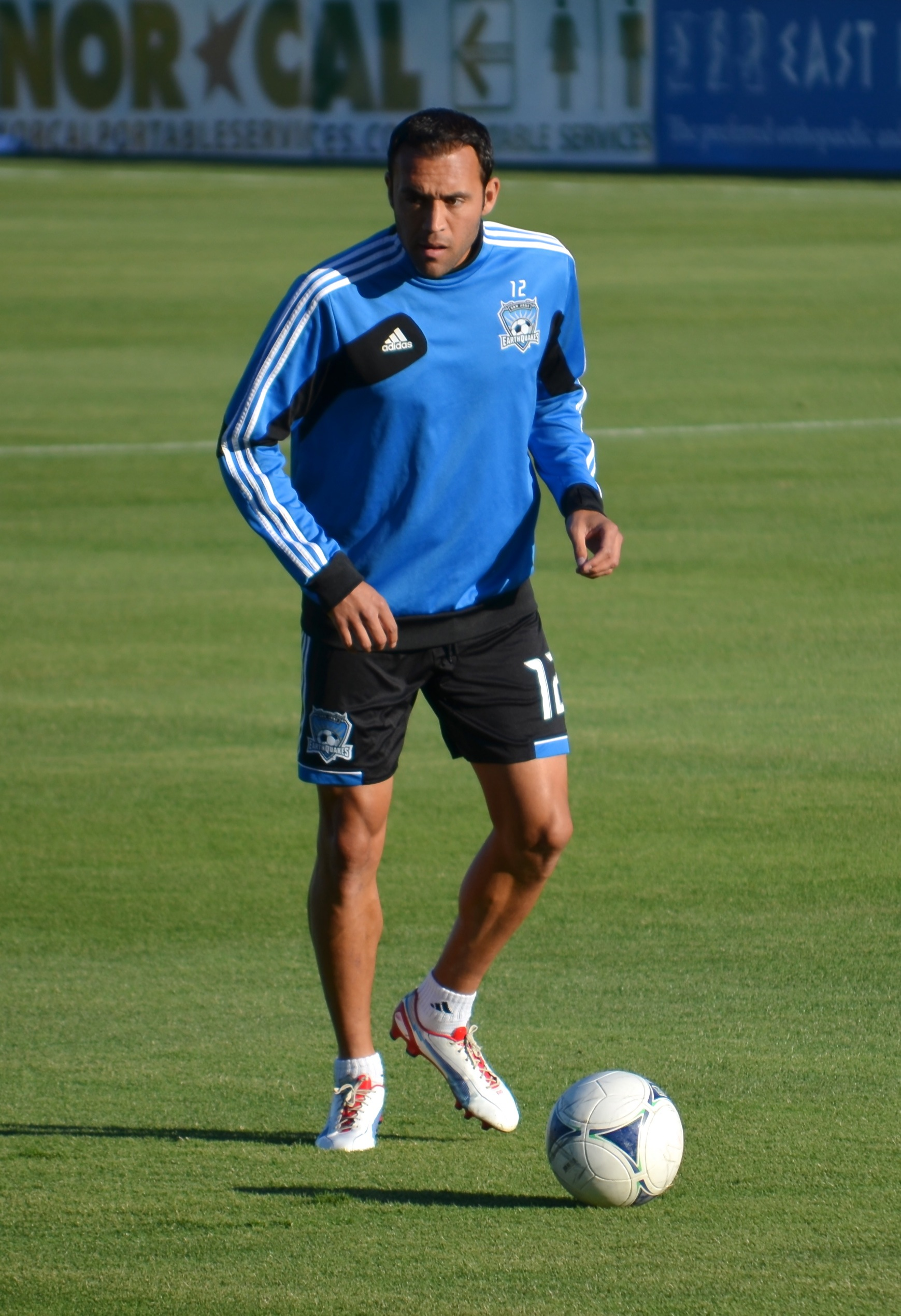
- Corrales with the San Jose Earthquakes

Personal information
- Date of birth: March 12, 1977 (age 49)
- Place of birth: Salinas, California, United States
- Height: 6 ft 0 in (1.83 m)
- Position: Defender

Senior career*
Years	Team	Apps	(Gls)
1995	California Jaguars		
1996–1997	San Jose Clash	25	(1)
1998	Miami Fusion	1	(0)
1998	→ MLS Pro-40 (loan)	15	(0)
1998–2000	MetroStars	56	(0)
2001–2004	San Jose Earthquakes	96	(8)
2005–2006	HamKam	46	(2)
2007	Brann	11	(1)
2008–2013	San Jose Earthquakes	129	(7)
2018–2019	Santa Cruz Breakers	8	(0)
Total		387	(19)

International career^{‡}
	United States U20	19	(0)
1996–2008	United States	6	(0)

Managerial career
- 2021–2024: Monterey Bay FC (assistant)
- * Club domestic league appearances and goals as of April 13, 2021 ‡ National team caps and goals as of October 26, 2013

Ramiro Corrales (born March 12, 1977) is an American former professional soccer player. He spent most of his professional playing career with the San Jose Earthquakes in Major League Soccer.

Known as a "reliable contributor who [is] strong in defense, composed and responsible with the ball and who works hard to make his teammates better", Corrales was the last remaining active MLS player from its inaugural season in 1996 upon his 2013 retirement.

== Club career ==
=== San Jose Clash (1996–1997) ===
Born in Salinas, California, Corrales did not play college soccer; instead he signed with the California Jaguars of USISL. He then became a professional and entered the 1996 MLS Inaugural Player Draft. This was before the advent of Project-40, so Corrales forfeited any opportunity to guarantee a college scholarship. Corrales was drafted 81st by the Columbus Crew but was then immediately traded to the San Jose Clash (later to be renamed "Earthquakes") for a second-round selection in the MLS Supplemental draft.

Ramiro made his MLS debut on April 28, 1996, as a substitute in a match against the LA Galaxy. His first assist came a couple months later on June 8 against the Dallas Burn and his first goal came off a free kick against the Tampa Bay Mutiny on September 9. In his rookie season for the San Jose Clash, he garnered a goal and an assist playing 11 matches. He started in 11 games the following season.

=== MetroStars (1998–2000) ===
In November 1997, Corrales was drafted 16th by the Miami Fusion in the 1997 Expansion Draft. He was traded again in June 1998, this time to the MetroStars in exchange for Carlos Parra. In 1998 Corrales played in 3 matches for the Metros, getting one assist. The 1999 season saw Corrales take a large amount of playing time with the club in a total 31 appearances. He was second on the team in minutes with 1,460. The 2000 season saw Corrales split his time between the Metrostars and the US Olympic squad who were going through Olympic qualification and the 2000 Summer Olympics soccer tournament. Corrales ended the season with two assists in twenty two games played.

=== San Jose Earthquakes (2001–2004) ===
In 2001, Corrales was traded back to San Jose for the rights to goalkeeper Paul Grafer. There, he was an integral part of coach Frank Yallop's squad that won the 2001 and 2003 MLS Cups. The 2002 season was one of Corrales' best, scoring three goals and providing nine assists in 28 matches played, both career highs. In nine years in MLS, Corrales scored nine goals and provided 19 assists.

=== HamKam (2005–2006) ===
Seeking to leave MLS, Corrales signed with Norwegian club Hamarkameratene on a three-year contract. He was part of a wave of American MLS players who went to Scandinavia to seek better wages and European play. He was signed to play as a central midfielder at the club but he mainly played as left back while sometimes being used as a left midfielder. In the 2006 season he scored his first goal in Norway, a free kick goal against IK Start. He was selected the club player of the year in the 2006 season by both local newspaper Hamar Arbeiderblad and as voted by the fans on the club's official homepage. Due to the fact that HamKam was relegated at the end of the season, rumors swirled about where Corrales would leave to. He was rumored to be heading for Spain or Belgium, though IK Start in Norway seemed to be the front runner to sign him.

=== Brann (2007) ===
On January 5, 2007, Hamarkameratene and Brann agreed on a transfer, but Corrales was expelled from Norway on February 9 by the Norwegian Directorate of Immigration, leaving it uncertain if he could play for Brann. Corrales was expelled because he had played the whole 2006 season without a work-permit. The case was solved on March 14 when the Norwegian Immigration Appeals Board (UNE) gave Corrales a new work-permit. Corrales dealt with injuries and made only 17 appearances overall for the club, but scored a goal and helped lead Brann to their first title since 1963.

After a US versus Sweden training match in January 2008, Ramiro refused to return to Bergen and expressed that he would rather give up soccer than return. He claimed he did not like the Bergen weather, although he later said he would accept a move to Oslo which has a more dry climate than Bergen. He also modified his statement to he did not like being benched. Corrales was rumored to return to MLS with Toronto FC and former club New York Red Bulls showing interest. The Houston Dynamo still held his rights, which were kept by the team since their move from San Jose in 2006, and so any return to MLS would have to go through Houston.

=== Return to San Jose Earthquakes (2008–2013) ===
Corrales eventually returned to the United States in 2008, re-signing for the San Jose Earthquakes, who bought his rights from the Houston Dynamo. He made his first appearance for the Quakes since 2004 on April 3, in a match against the LA Galaxy. He scored his first goal in his new stint on May 10 against the Columbus Crew.

After the departure of Quakes captain Nick Garcia in a trade, Corrales was selected by Frank Yallop to be the next player to lead the team. Yallop cited Corrales' experience, calm but stern leadership, and being bilingual as reasons for selecting him as captain. In 2009, he became the team's all-time leader in appearances with his 164th, in their match against FC Dallas on October 7 passing Richard Mulrooney to grab the record.

In 2010, he led the Quakes to the Eastern Conference Final of the MLS Cup playoffs, the club reaching the playoffs for the first time since 2005. They passed the New York Red Bulls in the Eastern Conference semi-finals, after the Quakes were down a goal in the first leg.

Entering into 2011, Corrales was dealing with more frequent injuries, and so he started to adapt to becoming more of a mentor than just a player. At the start of the season he was one of three players to have remained since the inaugural MLS season, the other two being Zach Thornton and Frankie Hejduk. In 2011, he played in his 200th career match for San Jose against the New York Red Bulls on July 2, becoming the first player to reach 200 games played with San Jose.

In 2012, he had a career year, captaining the Quakes in their Supporters Shield-winning season. He was selected by MLS commissioner Don Garber to participate in the 2012 MLS All Star game, his first ever. He played for 35 minutes in the match against Chelsea after being subbed in during the 56th minute for San Jose teammate Justin Morrow. He finished the season with two goals and seven assists, the assists tally the second highest in his career. When off-season came, Corrales saw his option declined by San Jose on November 28, 2012. He subsequently entered the 2012 MLS Re-Entry Draft and became a free agent after going undrafted in both rounds of the draft. He was re-signed by the Earthquakes for the 2013 season in both a playing and coaching capacity in February 2013.

He reached the 300th MLS appearance mark in a match against the Houston Dynamo in 2013, becoming the 21st player in MLS history to hit that mark. Corrales played his last game on October 26, 2013, against FC Dallas at Buck Shaw Stadium; he played as a starter and was subbed out in the 69th minute treated with a standing ovation and teammates carrying him off the pitch. He passed on his captain's armband to Chris Wondolowski, which served not only a practical in game purpose but also symbolized the transition of player leadership for the next season on, with Wondolowski serving as captain starting in 2014.

In 2018, he came out of retirement to become a player-coach for Premier Development League team Santa Cruz Breakers FC in their debut season.

== Post-playing career ==
Corrales was elected to the San Jose Earthquakes Hall of Fame on August 5, 2015. He was among the players selected for the "50 Greatest Quakes" in honor of the 50th anniversary of the founding of the original San Jose Earthquakes team.

In April 2021, he joined the technical staff of USL Championship expansion side Monterey Bay FC. Corrales and head coach Frank Yallop were both let go from their positions on July 31, 2024.

== Career statistics ==
As of match played October 26, 2013

Club	Season	League			National Cup		League Cup		Continental		Total	
Club	Season	Division	Apps	Goals	Apps	Goals	Apps	Goals	Apps	Goals	Apps	Goals
San Jose Clash	1996	Major League Soccer	11	1	0	0	1	0	0	0	12	1
San Jose Clash	1997	Major League Soccer	14	0	2	0	0	0	0	0	16	0
San Jose Clash	Total		25	1	2	0	1	0	0	0	28	1
Miami Fusion	1998	Major League Soccer	1	0	0	0	0	0	0	0	1	0
Miami Fusion	Total		1	0	0	0	0	0	0	0	1	0
MLS Pro-40	1998	A-League	15	0	0	0	0	0	0	0	15	0
MLS Pro-40	Total		15	0	0	0	0	0	0	0	15	0
MetroStars	1998	Major League Soccer	3	0	0	0	1	0	0	0	4	0
MetroStars	1999	Major League Soccer	31	0	1	0	0	0	0	0	32	0
MetroStars	2000	Major League Soccer	22	0	2	0	0	0	0	0	24	0
MetroStars	Total		56	0	3	0	1	0	0	0	60	0
San Jose Earthquakes	2001	Major League Soccer	14	1	0	0	6	0	0	0	20	1
San Jose Earthquakes	2002	Major League Soccer	28	3	2	0	2	0	4	1	36	4
San Jose Earthquakes	2003	Major League Soccer	25	1	1	0	1	0	0	0	27	1
San Jose Earthquakes	2004	Major League Soccer	29	3	2	1	2	0	2	0	36	4
San Jose Earthquakes	Total		96	8	5	1	11	0	6	1	119	10
HamKam	2005	Tippeligaen	20	0	5	0	0	0	0	0	25	0
HamKam	2006	Tippeligaen	25	2	4	0	0	0	0	0	29	2
HamKam	Total		45	2	9	0	0	0	0	0	54	2
SK Brann	2007	Tippeligaen	11	1	3	0	0	0	3	0	17	1
SK Brann	Total		11	1	3	0	0	0	3	0	17	1
San Jose Earthquakes	2008	Major League Soccer	22	2	1	0	0	0	0	0	23	2
San Jose Earthquakes	2009	Major League Soccer	24	0	0	0	0	0	0	0	24	0
San Jose Earthquakes	2010	Major League Soccer	20	1	1	0	2	0	0	0	23	1
San Jose Earthquakes	2011	Major League Soccer	29	2	2	0	0	0	0	0	31	2
San Jose Earthquakes	2012	Major League Soccer	22	2	1	0	1	0	0	0	24	2
San Jose Earthquakes	2013	Major League Soccer	12	0	0	0	0	0	1	0	13	0
San Jose Earthquakes	Total		129	7	4	0	3	0	1	0	138	7
Career total			261	19	26	1	16	0	10	1	432	21

== International ==
Corrales was born in the United States and is of Mexican descent. Ramiro has earned appearances for the United States national team, playing for the U-20 and U-23 teams along with four caps for the senior team in the 90's (his first coming October 16, 1996 against Peru). He also appeared in two games at the 2000 Sydney Olympics, helping the United States reach the semifinals. He was finally recalled in 2008 after an eight-year absence.

=== International Appearances ===
#	Date	Venue	Opponent	Score	Result	Competition
1.	October 16, 1996	Estadio Nacional, Lima, Peru	Peru	4–1	Loss	Friendly
2.	January 29, 1997	Kunming Tuodong Sports Center, Kunming, China	China	2–1	Loss	Friendly
3.	February 2, 1997	Tianhe Stadium, Guangzhou, China	China	1–1	Draw	Friendly
4.	November 17, 2004	Columbus Crew Stadium, Columbus, United States	Jamaica	1–1	Draw	2006 FIFA World Cup Qualification
5.	January 19, 2008	Home Depot Center, Carson, United States	Sweden	2–0	Win	Friendly
6.	February 6, 2008	Reliant Stadium, Houston, United States	Mexico	2–2	Draw	Friendly
Last updated November 1, 2014

== Honors ==
=== Club ===
San Jose Earthquakes

- MLS Cup: 2001, 2003
- MLS Supporters Shield: 2012

Brann

- Norwegian Premier League: 2007

=== Individual ===
- MLS All-Star: 2012
- San Jose Earthquakes Hall of Fame: 2015
- San Jose Earthquakes 50 Greatest Quakes: 2025

Sporting positions
Preceded by Nick Garcia	San Jose Earthquakes captain 2009–2013	Succeeded by Chris Wondolowski
