= Dwayne De Rosario =

Canadian soccer player (born 1978)

Dwayne De Rosario OOnt
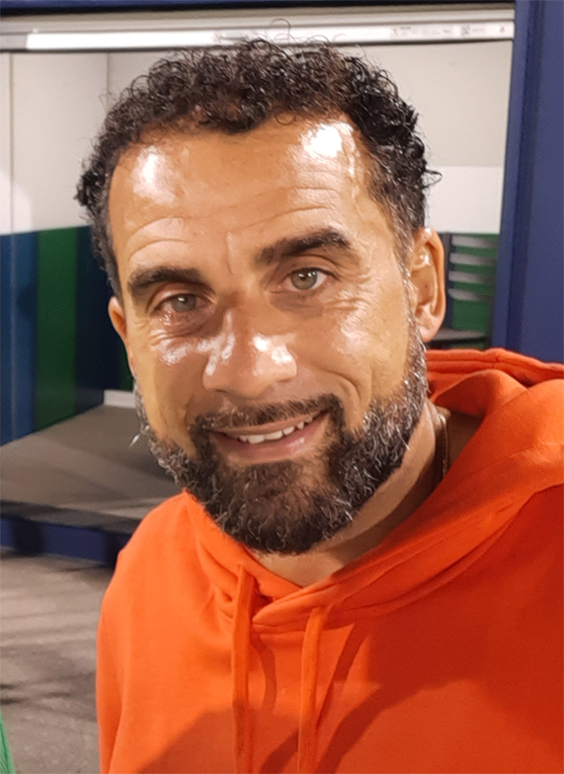
- De Rosario in 2023

Personal information
- Full name: Dwayne Anthony De Rosario
- Date of birth: May 15, 1978 (age 48)
- Place of birth: Scarborough, Ontario, Canada
- Height: 1.80 m (5 ft 11 in)
- Positions: Attacking midfielder; forward

Youth career
- Scarborough Blizzard SC
- Malvern Majors

Senior career*
Years	Team	Apps	(Gls)
1997	Toronto Lynx	7	(3)
1997–1999	FSV Zwickau	12	(1)
1999–2000	Richmond Kickers	35	(17)
2001–2005	San Jose Earthquakes	108	(27)
2006–2008	Houston Dynamo	78	(24)
2009–2011	Toronto FC	57	(27)
2011	New York Red Bulls	13	(2)
2011–2013	D.C. United	68	(23)
2014	Toronto FC	19	(1)
2018–2019	Mississauga MetroStars (indoor)	11	(8)
Total		408	(133)

International career
1996–1997	Canada U20	8	(5)
1999–2000	Canada U23	11	(3)
1998–2015	Canada	81	(22)
Medal record
Representing Canada
Men's soccer
CONCACAF Gold Cup
Winner	2000 United States
Third place	2002 United States
- * Club domestic league appearances and goals

Dwayne Anthony De Rosario OOnt (born May 15, 1978) is a Canadian former professional soccer player who played as a forward or as an attacking midfielder. He is the tenth-leading scorer in Major League Soccer history with 104 goals. De Rosario is widely regarded as one of the greatest and most influential Canadian players of all time.

A versatile attacker, he played for the Toronto Lynx, FSV Zwickau and Richmond Kickers early in his career. He came to prominence in the 2000s playing in the MLS for the San Jose Earthquakes, Houston Dynamo, Toronto FC, New York Red Bulls and D.C. United. A four-time MLS Cup champion, he also won the 2011 MLS Most Valuable Player award.

Internationally, De Rosario represented the Canadian national team from 1998 to 2015 where he was the country's all-time leading scorer, with 22 goals in 81 games. De Rosario is a 2000 CONCACAF Gold Cup champion and four-time Canadian Player of the Year. He is an honoured member of the Canada Soccer Hall of Fame and Canada's Sports Hall of Fame.

== Early life ==
Born in Scarborough, Ontario, a suburb of Toronto, De Rosario is the son of Guyanese immigrants to Canada. He began playing soccer at age three with Scarborough Blizzard SC, later playing with the Malvern Majors. As a 14-year-old, De Rosario rejected an offer from A.C. Milan after a successful trial because he was not ready to commit to living in Italy. De Rosario went to Winston Churchill Collegiate Institute in Scarborough.

De Rosario began his professional career in 1997 at the age of 18, signing with the Toronto Lynx of the A-League. Halfway through the season, however, De Rosario signed with German side FSV Zwickau. After two seasons with Zwickau, De Rosario returned to North America, signing with the Richmond Kickers in 1999. After a slow 1999 season, in which he registered two goals and five assists, De Rosario scored fifteen goals and provided five assists while leading the team to a 20–6–1 record in 2000.

== Club career ==
=== San Jose Earthquakes ===
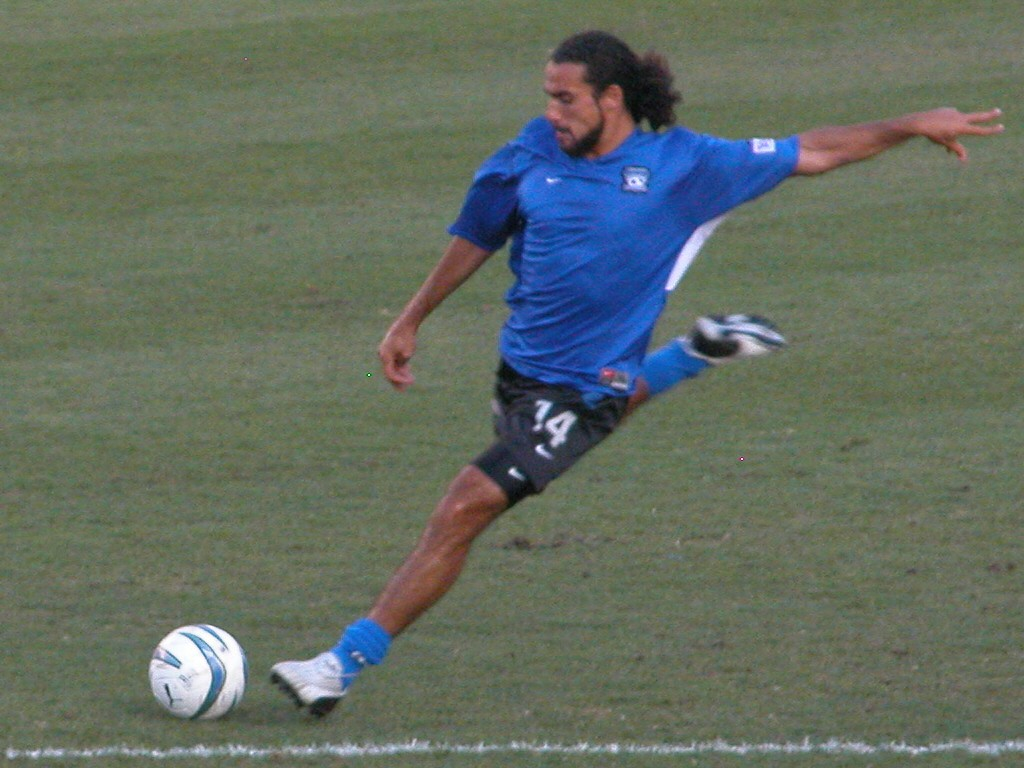
De Rosario warming up for a friendly while with San Jose Earthquakes in 2004

The next season, when Canadian Frank Yallop was named head coach of the San Jose Earthquakes, De Rosario was one of his first acquisitions. De Rosario proved Yallop's judgment right, scoring five goals and four assists in only 1,072 minutes for the Earthquakes in 2001, playing an important role as the team went on to win the MLS Cup; he scored the golden goal in the final and was named MLS Cup MVP. De Rosario had similar success in 2002, registering four goals and eight assists in 1,637 minutes, though the Quakes fell short of a repeat. In 2003, a torn ACL hobbled De Rosario for much of the season but he still managed to make a late surge, registering four goals and three assists in only 686 minutes and helping lead the team to a second MLS Cup championship. De Rosario played 1,211 minutes in 2004, scoring five goals, including the 2004 MLS Goal of the Year, and three assists.

In December 2004 De Rosario had a trial with Nottingham Forest, but he was not offered a contract by the team.

In 2005, following Landon Donovan's departure, De Rosario moved to midfield and promptly led MLS in assists with 13, while scoring nine goals, including the 2005 MLS Goal of the Year – the only player ever to receive that honour in two consecutive years – for a powerful bending free kick in the last regular season game against the Los Angeles Galaxy. He was named to the MLS Best XI six times (2005–07, 2009–11).

=== Houston Dynamo ===
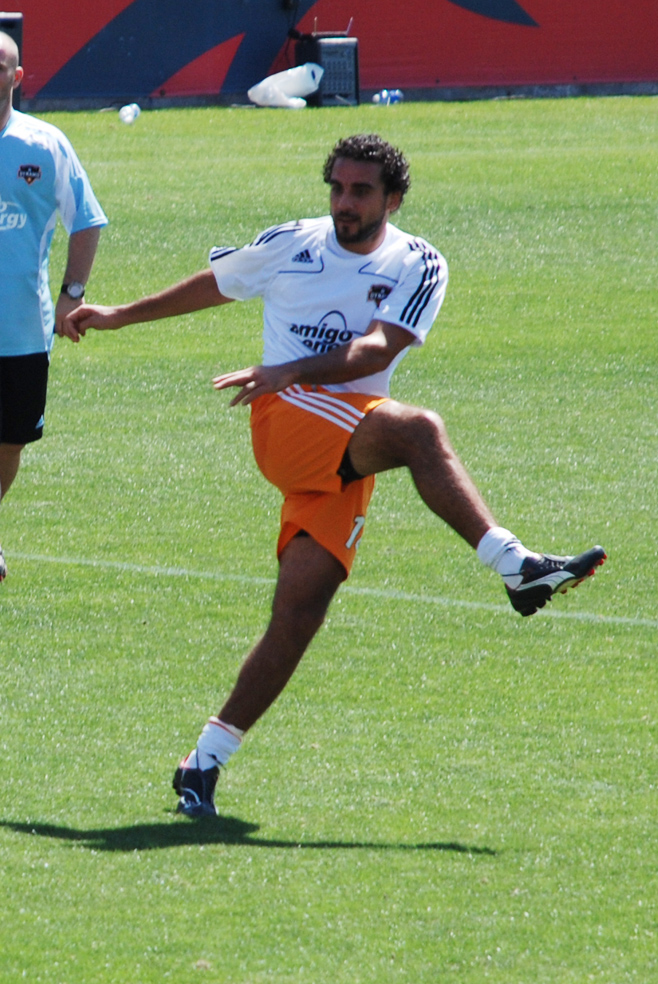
De Rosario in training with Houston Dynamo

Due to San Jose's failure to reach a stadium agreement with AEG, De Rosario, along with the rest of his Earthquakes teammates, moved to Houston for the 2006 season. During the 2006 MLS All-Star Game in Chicago, De Rosario scored the only goal of the game in the 70th minute to lift the MLS All Stars to a 1–0 win over Chelsea, a pre-season friendly for the London club. De Rosario was one of only four players on the MLS team to play the entire match.

De Rosario and the Houston Dynamo captured the 2006 MLS Cup title by beating the New England Revolution on November 12, 2006. The Dynamo won in a shootout, and De Rosario successfully converted his penalty kick. De Rosario signed a contract extension with Houston through 2010, where he was reported to make $325,000 per year. He was later transferred to Toronto before the end of his contract.

The next year, De Rosario assisted on Joseph Ngwenya's equalizing goal and scored the winning goal of the 2007 MLS Cup final, giving Houston a 2–1 win over the Revolution and the Dynamo their second championship. De Rosario was named MLS Cup MVP, the first player ever to win the award twice.

De Rosario made his third consecutive all-star appearance at the 2008 MLS All-Star Game in his home country, when the game was held in Toronto. He scored the decisive goal on a penalty kick in the 69th minute in the MLS All-Stars' 3–2 victory over West Ham United.

=== Toronto FC ===
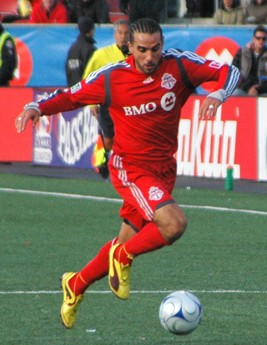
De Rosario playing for Toronto FC in 2010

De Rosario was traded to Toronto FC on December 12, 2008, in return for Julius James and allocation money, after long speculation that De Rosario would move to his hometown club. He made his competitive debut for Toronto FC on Saturday, March 21 against the Kansas City Wizards, setting up Jim Brennan for Toronto's first goal in a 3–2 victory. He scored his first goal for Toronto from a header in a 1–1 draw at BMO Field against FC Dallas.

De Rosario was expected to miss the first two to four weeks of Toronto FC's training camp due to a calf injury obtained in the January 31, 2010, match against Jamaica, and returned to game action in Toronto's 1–0 preseason win versus the University of South Florida.

On April 8, 2010, De Rosario was named captain of Toronto FC, the second in the club's history, after the retirement of Jim Brennan. Two days later, De Rosario scored his first goal of the 2010 season, his team's first, in a 4–1 loss to the New England Revolution.

On April 15, 2010, De Rosario scored twice in Toronto's 2–1 home opener win against the Philadelphia Union. In his next game versus the Colorado Rapids, De Rosario scored his fourth goal of the season, and more importantly, became Toronto FC's all-time leading scorer in the regular season. De Rosario again found the back of the net on April 25 in a 2–0 home win against Seattle Sounders FC, scoring the first goal, his fifth of the season. Until O'Brian White scored the second goal for Toronto, De Rosario had previously scored all of Toronto's goals up until that point in the season. For his efforts in that game, he was awarded the MLS Player of the Week for week 5. De Rosario was again honoured with the Player of the Week award on week 10 of the MLS season, for his two-goal performance against his former team the San Jose Earthquakes. De Rosario had scored the second and third goal in Toronto FC's 3–1 win.

De Rosario continued to have a successful 2010 season for Toronto, culminating in a spot on the MLS All-Star team, scoring a goal in the 5–2 loss to Manchester United.

On August 3, 2010, De Rosario scored against C.D. Motagua in the second leg of Toronto FC's CONCACAF Champions League preliminary round tie, which at the time, put TFC ahead on 2–1 on aggregate. They would eventually win 3–2 on aggregate.

On December 28, De Rosario was confirmed to be on trial with Scottish Premier League club Celtic by manager Neil Lennon. Dwayne and Celtic inquired about the possibility of a short-term loan deal until the MLS season kicked off in March, however new Toronto FC coach Aron Winter and the league denied any further negotiations.

De Rosario scored the first Toronto goal of the 2011 season on March 19 in a 4–2 away defeat to Vancouver Whitecaps FC in what was the league's first all Canadian match up. The goal scored in the 20th minute was also the 8000th goal scored in Major League Soccer's history.

=== New York Red Bulls ===
New York Red Bulls acquired De Rosario on April 1, 2011, in exchange for midfielder Tony Tchani, Danleigh Borman and a first round 2012 MLS SuperDraft pick. He scored his first goal for New York on a penalty, as the second goal, in a 3–2 loss to Chivas USA.

=== D.C. United ===
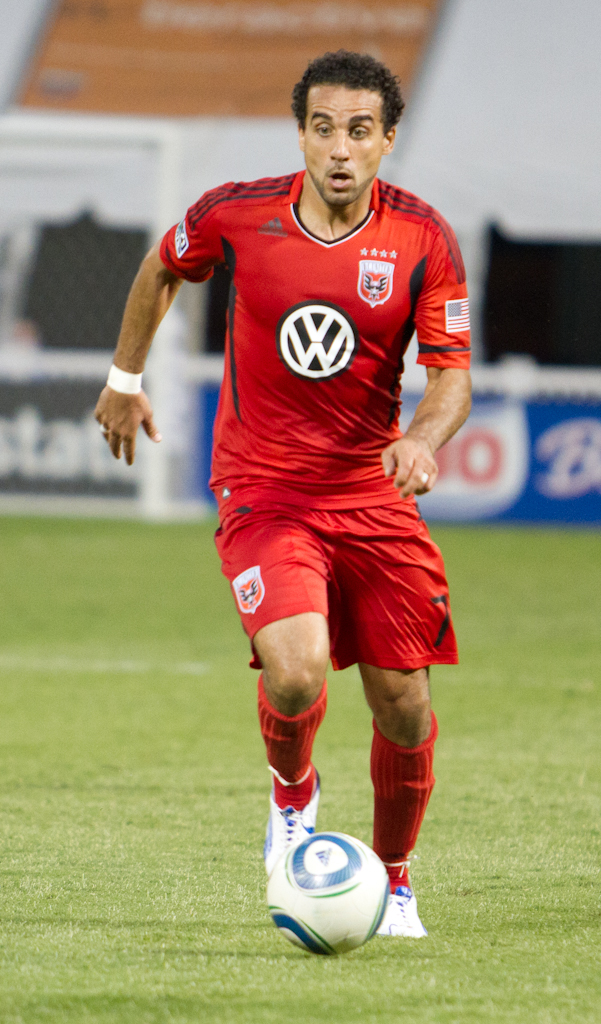
De Rosario playing with D.C. United

D.C. United acquired De Rosario on June 27, 2011, in exchange for midfielder Dax McCarty. He scored his first goal for the club against his former club New York Red Bulls on his return to Red Bull Arena. On July 30, 2011, his double gave United a 2–0 victory over former club, San Jose. On August 6, 2011, he led United to a 3–3 draw against Toronto F.C. with his hat-trick. All three goals were scored while United played with ten men following an early ejection of goalkeeper Bill Hamid. His second hat-trick was recorded on September 25, 2011, as he recorded all three goals in the span of 9 minutes, setting another MLS record. De Rosario completed the season with a total of 16 goals and 12 assists over 32 games. Of those, 13 goals and 7 assists were made during his 17 games with United.

On August 29, 2012, De Rosario scored his 100th MLS goal, in a 2–2 home draw against the Red Bulls. He was the seventh player to reach the milestone.

=== Return to Toronto FC ===
After having his option declined by D.C. United, De Rosario returned to Toronto FC on December 18, 2013, after being chosen in the 2013 MLS Re-Entry Draft. He officially signed with the club on January 9, 2014. It was announced on December 3, 2014, that Toronto had declined the option to renew De Rosario's contract.

De Rosario announced his retirement on May 10, 2015, and that he would be taking an ambassador role with Maple Leaf Sports & Entertainment, the owners of Toronto FC.

=== Mississauga MetroStars ===
In October 2018, De Rosario came out of retirement at age 40 to sign with the newly formed MASL club, the Mississauga MetroStars, as captain and assistant coach. He sought to earn his "A" coaching license while with the club and was approached by the MetroStars general manager after playing for the Canada arena soccer national team in March. De Rosario scored his first goal for the club in the MetroStars's opening match, an 11–3 loss away to the Baltimore Blast. The team folded before the start of the 2019–20 season due to issues finding a permanent home venue.

== International career ==
De Rosario represented the Canadian U-20 team at the 1997 FIFA World Youth Championship, and the Canadian U-23 team at the 1999 Pan American Games in Winnipeg. He received his first senior cap for Canada on May 18, 1998, against Macedonia at the age of 20. He won the 2000 CONCACAF Gold Cup with Canada and represented them as well at the 2001 FIFA Confederations Cup.

In 2007, De Rosario won the male Canadian Player of the Year award making it three consecutive years receiving the honour. In 2007, he scored five goals in eight games, the most in a year for the CMNT since John Catliff in 1993.

De Rosario was picked for his first CONCACAF Gold Cup in four years, after being selected by coach Stephen Hart in late May 2011 for the 23-man tournament roster. After a disappointing, 2–0 defeat to United States in the opening game of the group, Canada failed to exit the group with a 1–1–1 record; they only managed to score two goals both from De Rosario at the penalty spot. De Rosario continued his goal scoring for with two goals in the opening stage of 2014 FIFA World Cup qualification, one came against Saint Lucia in early September and the other against Saint Kitts and Nevis in mid November. His goal against Saint Kitts, was his 19th international goal which tied him as Canadian all-time top goal scorer with Dale Mitchell. On December 14, De Rosario was awarded 2011 Canadian Player of the Year receiving 47.7% of the vote, Simeon Jackson in second and Josh Simpson finishing in third. This was the fourth time De Rosario was honoured with the award. On September 7, 2012, De Rosario scored his 20th goal for Canada in a 2014 FIFA World Cup qualification match against Panama, making him the all-time leading goal scorer for Canada.

In De Rosario's final appearance for Canada, he scored a goal in a 1–1 draw with Iceland on January 19, 2015.

De Rosario was the country's all-time leading male goalscorer, with 22 international goals in 81 matches, until Cyle Larin surpassed his record in 2022.

== Personal life ==
De Rosario adopted a strict vegan diet in 1994, but started eating fish ten years later. He is married to Brandy De Rosario and has four children, including his sons Osaze and Adisa, who are also professional soccer players. His cousin is Olympic hurdler Priscilla Lopes-Schliep. He was appointed to the Order of Ontario in February 2020. His autobiography 'DeRo: My Life', written with Brendan Dunlop was published in May 2021 by ECW Press.

=== DeRo United Futbol Academy ===
In 2012, De Rosario established the DeRo United Futbol Academy. They entered a team in the League1 Ontario women's division beginning in 2018. In June 2021, the club became an official affiliate team of De Rosario's former club Toronto FC, joining their academy system and re-branded as DeRo TFC.

== Career statistics ==
=== Club ===
As of July 14, 2021

Appearances and goals by club, season and competition
Club	Season	League			Cup^{1}		Continental^{2}		Other^{3}		Total	
Club	Season	Division	Apps	Goals	Apps	Goals	Apps	Goals	Apps	Goals	Apps	Goals
Toronto Lynx	1997	A-League	7	2	—		—		—		7	2
FSV Zwickau	1997–98	2. Bundesliga	12	1	1	0	—		—		13	1
FSV Zwickau	1998–99	2. Bundesliga	0	0	0	0	—		—		0	0
Richmond Kickers	1999	A-League	16	1	—		—		—		16	1
Richmond Kickers	2000	A-League	23	15	—		—		—		23	15
Richmond Kickers	Total		39	16	0	0	0	0	0	0	39	16
San Jose Earthquakes	2001	MLS	21	5	0	0	—		4	2	25	7
San Jose Earthquakes	2002	MLS	27	4	0	0	0	0	1	0	28	4
San Jose Earthquakes	2003	MLS	11	4	0	0	0	0	3	0	14	4
San Jose Earthquakes	2004	MLS	21	5	0	0	0	0	2	1	23	6
San Jose Earthquakes	2005	MLS	28	9	0	0	—		2	0	28	9
San Jose Earthquakes	Total		108	27	0	0	0	0	12	3	120	30
Houston Dynamo	2006	MLS	30	11	3	1	—		4	0	37	12
Houston Dynamo	2007	MLS	24	6	0	0	4	0	8	3	36	9
Houston Dynamo	2008	MLS	24	7	0	0	9	3	6	1	39	11
Houston Dynamo	Total		78	24	3	1	13	3	18	4	112	32
Toronto FC	2009	MLS	28	11	4	3	2	0	—		34	14
Toronto FC	2010	MLS	27	15	4	1	8	1	—		39	17
Toronto FC	2011	MLS	2	1	0	0	0	0	—		2	1
Toronto FC	Total		57	27	8	4	10	1	0	0	75	32
New York Red Bulls	2011	MLS	13	2	0	0	—		0	0	13	2
D.C. United	2011	MLS	18	13	0	0	—		—		18	13
D.C. United	2012	MLS	27	7	1	0	—		—		28	7
D.C. United	2013	MLS	23	3	5	5	—		—		28	8
D.C. United	Total		68	23	6	5	0	0	0	0	74	28
Toronto FC	2014	MLS	19	1	4	0	—		—		23	1
Mississauga MetroStars	2018–19	MASL	11	8	—		—		—		11	8
Career total			412	131	22	10	23	4	30	7	487	152

- 1.Includes Canadian Championship, DFB-Pokal, and U.S. Open Cup.
- 2.Includes CONCACAF Champions' Cup and CONCACAF Champions League.
- 3.Includes MLS Cup Playoffs and North American SuperLiga.

=== International ===
Appearances and goals by national team and year
National team	Year	Apps	Goals
Canada U20	1996	4	4
Canada U20	1997	4	1
Canada U20	Total	8	5
Canada U23	1999	6	3
Canada U23	2000	4	0
Canada U23	Total	10	3
Canada	1998	1	0
Canada	1999	2	0
Canada	2000	2	0
Canada	2001	4	0
Canada	2002	7	2
Canada	2003	1	1
Canada	2004	10	4
Canada	2005	8	0
Canada	2006	2	0
Canada	2007	8	5
Canada	2008	8	3
Canada	2009	0	0
Canada	2010	2	0
Canada	2011	11	4
Canada	2012	5	1
Canada	2013	6	0
Canada	2014	2	0
Canada	2015	2	2
Total		81	22

=== International goals ===
Scores and results list Canada's goal tally first, score column indicates score after each De Rosario goal.

List of international goals scored by Dwayne De Rosario
No.	Date	Venue	Opponent	Score	Result	Competition
1	February 2, 2002	Rose Bowl, Pasadena	South Korea	2–1		2002 CONCACAF Gold Cup
2	October 15, 2002	Easter Road, Edinburgh	Scotland		1–3	Friendly
3	October 11, 2003	Ratina Stadion, Tampere	Finland		2–3	Friendly
4	June 16, 2004	Richardson Memorial Stadium, Kingston	Belize		4–0	2006 FIFA World Cup qualification
5	June 16, 2004	Richardson Memorial Stadium, Kingston	Belize		4–0	2006 FIFA World Cup qualification
6	October 13, 2004	Swangard Stadium, Burnaby	Costa Rica		1–3	2006 FIFA World Cup qualification
7	November 17, 2004	Estadio Mateo Flores, Guatemala City	Guatemala		1–0	2006 FIFA World Cup qualification
8	June 1, 2007	Polideportivo de Pueblo Nuevo, San Cristóbal, Táchira	Venezuela		2–2	Friendly
9	June 11, 2007	Orange Bowl, Miami	Haiti		2–0	2007 CONCACAF Gold Cup
10	June 11, 2007	Orange Bowl, Miami	Haiti		2–0	2007 CONCACAF Gold Cup
11	June 16, 2007	Gillette Stadium, Foxborough	Guatemala		3–0	2007 CONCACAF Gold Cup
12	September 12, 2007	BMO Field, Toronto	Costa Rica		1–1	Friendly
13	January 30, 2008	Stade Louis Achille, Fort-de-France	Martinique		1–0	Friendly
14	June 20, 2008	Saputo Stadium, Montreal	Saint Vincent and the Grenadines		4–1	2010 FIFA World Cup qualification
15	June 20, 2008	Saputo Stadium, Montreal	Saint Vincent and the Grenadines		4–1	2010 FIFA World Cup qualification
16	June 11, 2011	Raymond James Stadium, Tampa	Guadeloupe		1–0	2011 CONCACAF Gold Cup
17	June 14, 2011	Livestrong Sporting Park, Kansas City	Panama		1–1	2011 CONCACAF Gold Cup
18	September 2, 2011	BMO Field, Toronto	Saint Lucia		4–1	2014 FIFA World Cup qualification
19	November 15, 2011	BMO Field, Toronto	Saint Kitts and Nevis		4–0	2014 FIFA World Cup qualification
20	September 7, 2012	BMO Field, Toronto	Panama		1–0	2014 FIFA World Cup qualification
21	January 16, 2015	UCF Soccer and Track Stadium, Orlando	Iceland		1–2	Friendly
22	January 19, 2015	UCF Soccer and Track Stadium, Orlando	Iceland		1–1	Friendly

== Honours ==
=== Player ===
San Jose Earthquakes

- MLS Cup: 2001, 2003
- Supporters' Shield: 2005

Houston Dynamo

- MLS Cup: 2006, 2007

Toronto FC

- Canadian Championship: 2009, 2010

D.C. United

- U.S. Open Cup: 2013

Canada

- CONCACAF Gold Cup: 2000; 3rd place, 2002

=== Individual ===
- MLS MVP Award: 2011
- MLS All-Star: 2006, 2007, 2008, 2009, 2010, 2011, 2012
- MLS Best XI: 2005, 2006, 2007, 2009, 2010, 2011
- MLS Golden Boot: 2011
- MLS 100 goals club
- MLS 50/50 Club
- MLS Goal of the Year Award: 2004, 2005
- George Gross Memorial Trophy: 2009, 2010
- Canadian Players of the Year: 2005, 2006, 2007, 2011
- Red Patch Boys Player of the Year: 2009
- Major League Soccer 25 Greatest Players
- Ontario Sports Hall of Fame inductee, 2019
- The Order of Ontario appointee, 2020
- Inducted into Canada's Sports Hall of Fame, 2022

Sporting positions
Preceded by Jim Brennan	Toronto FC captain 2010–2011	Succeeded by Maicon Santos
