= List of international goals scored by Dwayne De Rosario =

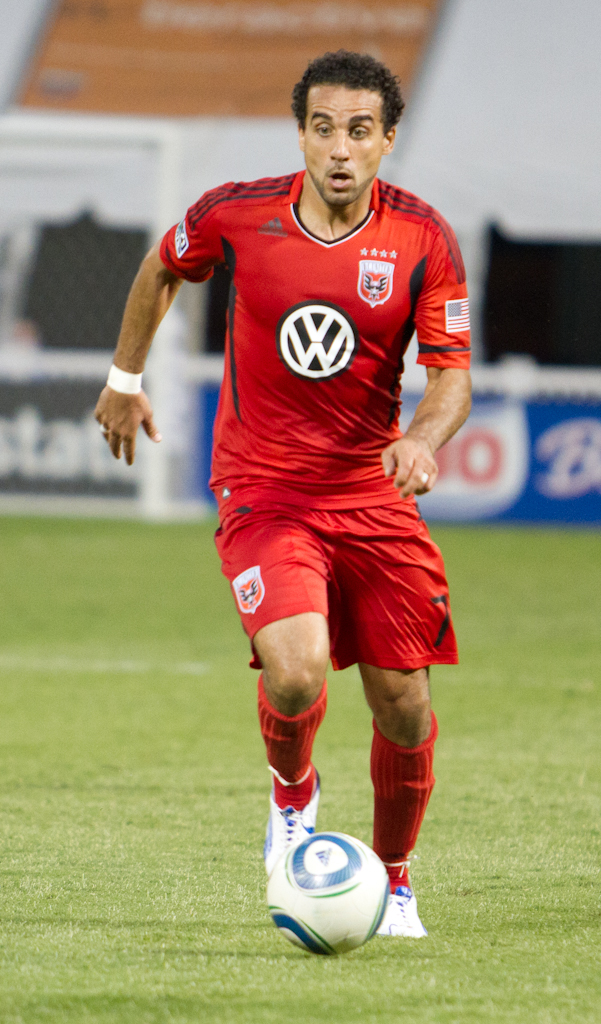
Dwayne De Rosario, pictured playing for D.C. United in 2011

Dwayne De Rosario is a retired Canadian soccer player who represented the Canada national team in international competition from 1998 to 2015. He was the country's all-time leading male goalscorer from 2012 to 2022, with 22 international goals in 81 matches, until Cyle Larin surpassed his record with 23 goals. De Rosario played as an attacking midfielder or forward for most of his club career, which included stints with five Major League Soccer teams in the United States and Canada. He won the MLS Cup four times in fourteen seasons and was named one of the league's 25 all-time greatest players in 2020.

After reaching the second round of the 1997 FIFA World Youth Championship, De Rosario made his international debut for Canada in 1998 at the age of 20. He played in the 1999 Pan American Games with the under-23 squad, scoring three goals for the hosts as the team placed fourth. De Rosario was part of the Canada team that won the 2000 CONCACAF Gold Cup, making one appearance; he also played twice in the 2001 FIFA Confederations Cup. De Rosario scored his first international goal during the third place match of the 2002 CONCACAF Gold Cup against South Korea, giving Canada a 2–1 victory. He went on to play in five editions of the CONCACAF Gold Cup, scoring six goals, and was named Canadian Male Soccer Player of the Year four times over the course of his career. De Rosario scored nine goals during several unsuccessful FIFA World Cup qualification campaigns, as Canada were unable to qualify during the 1990s, 2000s and 2010s.

De Rosario overtook Dale Mitchell for Canada's all-time men's goalscoring record with his 20th goal, scored against Panama during World Cup qualifying on September 7, 2012. The overall Canadian record is held by Christine Sinclair, who scored 190 international goals during her career. He announced his retirement from soccer in May 2015, four months after scoring his final national team goal against Iceland in a friendly on January 19, 2015. Over the course of his 17-year national team career, Canada had a record of 11 wins, 4 losses, and 4 draws during matches in which De Rosario scored. He continued to hold the goalscoring record after his retirement until Cyle Larin scored his 23rd goal on January 30, 2022. De Rosario was named to the All-Time Canada Men's XI by the Canada Soccer Association in 2012. He was inducted into Canada's Sports Hall of Fame in June 2022 and the Canada Soccer Hall of Fame in March 2024.

== International goals ==
"Score" represents the score in the match after De Rosario's goal. "Score" and "Result" list Canada's goal tally first. As of match played January 19, 2015.

List of international goals scored by Dwayne De Rosario
No.	Cap	Date	Venue	Opponent	Score	Result	Competition	Ref.
1	14	February 2, 2002	Rose Bowl, Pasadena, United States	South Korea	2–1	2–1	2002 CONCACAF Gold Cup	
2	16	October 15, 2002	Easter Road, Edinburgh, Scotland	Scotland	1–0	1–3	Friendly	
3	17	October 11, 2003	Ratina Stadion, Tampere, Finland	Finland	2–3	2–3	Friendly	
4	21	June 16, 2004	Richardson Memorial Stadium, Kingston, Canada	Belize	2–0	4–0	2006 FIFA World Cup qualification	
5	21	June 16, 2004	Richardson Memorial Stadium, Kingston, Canada	Belize	3–0	4–0	2006 FIFA World Cup qualification	
6	26	October 13, 2004	Swangard Stadium, Burnaby, Canada	Costa Rica	1–0	1–3	2006 FIFA World Cup qualification	
7	27	November 17, 2004	Estadio Mateo Flores, Guatemala City, Guatemala	Guatemala	1–0	1–0	2006 FIFA World Cup qualification	
8	39	June 1, 2007	Estadio José Pachencho Romero, Maracaibo, Venezuela	Venezuela	1–0	2–2	Friendly	
9	42	June 11, 2007	Orange Bowl, Miami, United States	Haiti	1–0	2–0	2007 CONCACAF Gold Cup	
10	42	June 11, 2007	Orange Bowl, Miami, United States	Haiti	2–0	2–0	2007 CONCACAF Gold Cup	
11	43	June 16, 2007	Gillette Stadium, Foxborough, United States	Guatemala	1–0	3–0	2007 CONCACAF Gold Cup	
12	45	September 12, 2007	BMO Field, Toronto, Canada	Costa Rica	1–1	1–1	Friendly	
13	46	January 30, 2008	Stade Louis Achille, Fort-de-France, Martinique	Martinique	1–0	1–0	Friendly	
14	50	June 20, 2008	Saputo Stadium, Montreal, Canada	Saint Vincent and the Grenadines	1–0	4–1	2010 FIFA World Cup qualification	
15	50	June 20, 2008	Saputo Stadium, Montreal, Canada	Saint Vincent and the Grenadines	3–0	4–1	2010 FIFA World Cup qualification	
16	59	June 11, 2011	Raymond James Stadium, Tampa, United States	Guadeloupe	1–0	1–0	2011 CONCACAF Gold Cup	
17	60	June 14, 2011	Livestrong Sporting Park, Kansas City, United States	Panama	1–0	1–1	2011 CONCACAF Gold Cup	
18	61	September 2, 2011	BMO Field, Toronto, Canada	Saint Lucia	2–1	4–1	2014 FIFA World Cup qualification	
19	66	November 15, 2011	BMO Field, Toronto, Canada	Saint Kitts and Nevis	2–0	4–0	2014 FIFA World Cup qualification	
20	70	September 7, 2012	BMO Field, Toronto, Canada	Panama	1–0	1–0	2014 FIFA World Cup qualification	
21	80	January 16, 2015	UCF Soccer and Track Stadium, Orlando, United States	Iceland	1–2	1–2	Friendly	
22	81	January 19, 2015	UCF Soccer and Track Stadium, Orlando, United States	Iceland	1–0	1–1	Friendly	

== Statistics ==
Appearances and goals by year
Year	Apps	Goals
1998	1	0
1999	2	0
2000	2	0
2001	4	0
2002	7	2
2003	1	1
2004	10	4
2005	8	0
2006	2	0
2007	8	5
2008	8	3
2009	0	0
2010	2	0
2011	11	4
2012	5	1
2013	6	0
2014	2	0
2015	2	2
Total	81	22

Goals by competition
Competition	Caps	Goals
FIFA World Cup qualification	24	9
FIFA Confederations Cup	2	0
CONCACAF Gold Cup	18	6
Friendlies	37	7
Total	81	22
