= 2006 Major League Soccer season =

11th season of Major League Soccer

- Season: 2006
- Teams: 12
- MLS Cup: Houston Dynamo (1st title)
- Supporters' Shield: D.C. United (3rd shield)
- 2007 CONCACAF Champions' Cup: Houston Dynamo; D.C. United
- Matches: 192
- Goals: 503 (2.62 per match)
- Top goalscorer: Jeff Cunningham; Real Salt Lake; Goals: 16
- Biggest home win: NY 6–0 RSL
- Biggest away win: NY 1–4 DCU; LA 0–3 RSL; DCU 2–5 LA
- Highest scoring: NY 5–4 CHV
- Longest winning run: D.C. United; Wins: 6 (06/21 – 07/15)
- Longest unbeaten run: D.C. United; Wins: 14 (05/13 – 07/22)
- Longest losing run: K.C. Wizards; Loss: 7 (06/24 – 07/22); Los Angeles Galaxy; Loss: 7 (05/06 -06/08)
- Highest attendance: Los Angeles Galaxy; Season: 333,016; Game avg.: 20,814
- Lowest attendance: Kansas City Wizards; Season: 177,322; Game avg.: 11,083
- Total attendance: 2,976,787
- Average attendance: 15,504

Locations of teams for the 2006 Major League Soccer season
Western Conference Eastern Conference

The 2006 Major League Soccer season was the 11th season of Major League Soccer. It was also the 94th season of FIFA-sanctioned soccer in the United States, and the 28th with a national first-division league.

The MetroStars were bought by Austrian company Red Bull and rebranded as the New York Red Bulls.

Due to owner AEG being unable to secure a soccer specific stadium in San Jose, the Earthquakes ceased operations and had their personnel transferred to the expansion Houston Dynamo.

In June, the Chicago Fire moved into their new soccer-specific stadium, Toyota Park, in Bridgeview, Illinois.

The regular season began on April 1, and concluded on October 15. The 2006 MLS Cup Playoffs began on October 21, and concluded with MLS Cup 2006 on November 12. Houston marked their inaugural season with a league championship by defeating the New England Revolution on penalties in MLS Cup.

== Overview ==
=== Season format ===
The season began on April 1 and concluded with MLS Cup on November 12. The 12 teams were split evenly into two conferences. Each team played 32 games that were evenly divided between home and away. Each team played every other team in their conference four times, and every team in the opposite conference twice.

The top four teams from each conference qualified for the MLS Cup Playoffs. In the first round, aggregate goals over two matches determined the winners. The conference finals were played as a single match, and the winners advanced to MLS Cup. In all rounds, draws were broken with two 15-minute periods of extra time, followed by penalty kicks if necessary. The away goals rule was not used in any round.

The team with the most points in the regular season was awarded the MLS Supporters' Shield and qualified for the CONCACAF Champions' Cup. Additionally, the winner of MLS Cup also qualified for the CONCACAF Champions' Cup. If a team qualified for multiple berths into the Champions' Cup, then additional berths were awarded to the highest overall finishing MLS team(s) not already qualified. Qualification for the inaugural SuperLiga was also awarded to the MLS Cup Champion and Supporters' Shield winner, as well two invited teams, FC Dallas and LA Galaxy.

Automatic qualification for the U.S. Open Cup was awarded to the top three finishers in each conference. The rest of the U.S.-based MLS teams had to qualify for the remaining two berths via a series of play-in games.

=== Stadiums and locations ===
Team	Stadium	Capacity
Chicago Fire	Toyota Park	20,000
Chivas USA	Home Depot Center	27,000
Colorado Rapids	Invesco Field at Mile High	76,125
Columbus Crew	Columbus Crew Stadium	22,555
D.C. United	RFK Stadium	46,000
FC Dallas	Pizza Hut Park	21,193
Houston Dynamo	Robertson Stadium	32,000
Kansas City Wizards	Arrowhead Stadium	81,425
Los Angeles Galaxy	Home Depot Center	27,000
New England Revolution	Gillette Stadium	68,756
New York Red Bulls	Giants Stadium	80,200
Real Salt Lake	Rice-Eccles Stadium	45,017

=== Personnel and sponsorships ===
Team	Head coach	Captain	Shirt sponsor
Chicago Fire	(United States) Dave Sarachan		Honda
Chivas USA	(United States) Bob Bradley		—
Colorado Rapids	(United States) Fernando Clavijo		—
Columbus Crew	(United States) Sigi Schmid	(United States) Robin Fraser	—
D.C. United	(Poland) Piotr Nowak		Sierra Mist
FC Dallas	(Northern Ireland) Colin Clarke		RadioShack
Houston Dynamo	(United States) Dominic Kinnear	(United States) Wade Barrett	—
Kansas City Wizards	(United States) Brian Bliss		U.S. Soccer Foundation
Los Angeles Galaxy	(Canada) Frank Yallop		Budweiser
New England Revolution	(Scotland) Steve Nicol		Sierra Mist
New York Red Bulls	(United States) Bruce Arena	(Honduras) Amado Guevara	Red Bull
Real Salt Lake	(United States) John Ellinger	(United States) Jason Kreis	—

=== Coaching changes ===
Team	Outgoing coach	Manner of departure	Date of vacancy	Incoming coach	Date of appointment
Los Angeles Galaxy	(United States) Steve Sampson	Fired	June 6, 2006	(Canada) Frank Yallop	June 7, 2006
New York Red Bulls	(Scotland) Mo Johnston	Fired	June 27, 2006	(United States) Richie Williams	June 28, 2006
New York Red Bulls	(United States) Richie Williams	End of interim period	July 18, 2006	(United States) Bruce Arena	July 18, 2006
Kansas City Wizards	(United States) Bob Gansler	Resigned	July 19, 2006	(United States) Brian Bliss	July 19, 2006

== Standings ==
=== Eastern Conference ===
Pos	Team	Pld	W	L	T	GF	GA	GD	Pts	Qualification
1	D.C. United	32	15	7	10	52	38	+14	55	MLS Cup Playoffs
2	New England Revolution	32	12	8	12	39	35	+4	48	MLS Cup Playoffs
3	Chicago Fire	32	13	11	8	43	41	+2	47	MLS Cup Playoffs
4	New York Red Bulls	32	9	11	12	41	41	0	39	MLS Cup Playoffs
5	Kansas City Wizards	32	10	14	8	43	45	−2	38	
6	Columbus Crew	32	8	15	9	30	42	−12	33	

Source: MLS

=== Western Conference ===
Pos	Team	Pld	W	L	T	GF	GA	GD	Pts	Qualification
1	FC Dallas	32	16	12	4	48	44	+4	52	MLS Cup Playoffs
2	Houston Dynamo	32	11	8	13	44	40	+4	46	MLS Cup Playoffs
3	Chivas USA	32	10	9	13	45	42	+3	43	MLS Cup Playoffs
4	Colorado Rapids	32	11	13	8	36	49	−13	41	MLS Cup Playoffs
5	Los Angeles Galaxy	32	11	15	6	37	37	0	39	
6	Real Salt Lake	32	10	13	9	45	49	−4	39	

Source: MLS

=== Overall standings ===
Pos	Team	Pld	W	L	T	GF	GA	GD	Pts	Qualification
1	D.C. United (S)	32	15	7	10	52	38	+14	55	CONCACAF Champions' Cup
2	FC Dallas	32	16	12	4	48	44	+4	52	North American SuperLiga
3	New England Revolution	32	12	8	12	39	35	+4	48	
4	Chicago Fire	32	13	11	8	43	41	+2	47	
5	Houston Dynamo (C)	32	11	8	13	44	40	+4	46	CONCACAF Champions' Cup
6	Chivas USA	32	10	9	13	45	42	+3	43	
7	Colorado Rapids	32	11	13	8	36	49	−13	41	
8	New York Red Bulls	32	9	11	12	41	41	0	39	
9	Los Angeles Galaxy	32	11	15	6	37	37	0	39	North American SuperLiga
10	Real Salt Lake	32	10	13	9	45	49	−4	39	
11	Kansas City Wizards	32	10	14	8	43	45	−2	38	
12	Columbus Crew	32	8	15	9	30	42	−12	33	

Source: MLS
Rules for classification: 1) points; 2) head-to-head record; 3) goal difference; 4) number of goals scored
(C) Champions; (S) Supporters' Shield

== MLS Cup playoffs ==
=== Bracket ===
Conference semifinals
E1	D.C. United	1	1
E4	New York	0	1
Eastern Conference
E3	Chicago	1	1 (2)
E2	New England (p)	0	2 (4)
W1	Dallas	2	2 (4)
W4	Colorado (p)	1	3 (5)
Western Conference
W3	Chivas USA	2	0
W2	Houston	1	2

Conference finals
E1	D.C. United	0
E2	New England	1
W4	Colorado	1
W2	Houston	3

MLS Cup
E2	New England	1 (3)
W2	Houston (p)	1 (4)

=== Conference semifinals ===
October 21, 2006

D.C. United	1–0	New York Red Bulls
Gómez 77'	Report

Giants Stadium
East Rutherford, New Jersey
Attendance: 8,630
Referee: Michael Kennedy
October 29, 2006

New York Red Bulls	1–1	D.C. United
Altidore 70'	Report	Gómez 86'

RFK Stadium
Washington, D.C.
Attendance: 21,455
Referee: Tim Weyland

D.C. United advance 2–1 on aggregate.

October 22, 2006

New England Revolution	0–1	Chicago Fire
	Report	Mapp 35'

Toyota Park
Bridgeview, Illinois
Attendance: 10,217
Referee: Tim Weyland
October 28, 2006

Chicago Fire	1–2 (a.e.t.)	New England Revolution
Jaqua 18'	(Report)	Twellman 41'; Noonan 58'
Penalties
Thiago (penalty missed); Gutiérrez (penalty scored); Herron (penalty scored); Guerrero (penalty missed)	2–4	(penalty scored) Cancela; (penalty scored) Reis; (penalty scored) Noonan; (penalty scored) Twellman

Gillette Stadium
Foxborough, Massachusetts
Attendance: 9,372
Referee: Jair Marrufo

New England Revolution advance 4–2 on penalties (2–2 aggregate after extra time).

October 21, 2006

FC Dallas	2–1	Colorado Rapids
Ruíz 15'; Thompson 55'	Report	Cooke 23'; Martins (red card) 88'

INVESCO Field at Mile High
Denver, Colorado
Attendance: 4,176
Referee: Hilario Grajeda
October 28, 2006

Colorado Rapids	3–2 (a.e.t.)	FC Dallas
Hernández 57', 83'; Mathis 114'	Report	Gbandi (red card) 29'; Ruíz 48'; Goodson 92'
Penalties
Mathis (penalty scored); Hernández (penalty scored); Kirovski (penalty scored); Beckerman (penalty scored); Karanka (penalty missed); Mastroeni (penalty scored)	5–4	(penalty scored) Ruíz; (penalty scored) O'Brien; (penalty scored) Mulrooney; (penalty missed) Vanney; (penalty scored) Valakari; (penalty missed) Sala

Pizza Hut Park
Frisco, Texas
Attendance: 15,486
Referee: Abiodun Okulaja

Colorado Rapids advance 5–4 on penalties (4–4 aggregate after extra time).

October 22, 2006

Houston Dynamo	1–2	Chivas USA
Ching 75'	Report	Razov 45'; Palencia 68'

Home Depot Center
Carson, California
Attendance: 15,110
Referee: Jorge Gonzalez
October 29, 2006

Chivas USA	0–2	Houston Dynamo
Palencia (yellow card) 57' (yellow-red card) 58'	Report	Davis 64' (pen.); Ching 90+3'

Robertson Stadium
Houston, Texas
Attendance: 17,440
Referee: Michael Kennedy

Houston Dynamo advance 3–2 on aggregate.

=== Conference finals ===
November 5, 2006

New England Revolution	1–0	D.C. United
Twellman 4'	Report

RFK Stadium
Washington, D.C.
Attendance: 19,552
Referee: Kevin Stott

New England Revolution advances 1–0 in single elimination.

November 5, 2006

Colorado Rapids	1–3	Houston Dynamo
Kirovski 4'	Report	Dalglish 10', 21'; Mullan 71'

Robertson Stadium
Houston, Texas
Attendance: 23,107
Referee: Brian Hall

Houston Dynamo advances 3–1 in single elimination.

=== MLS Cup ===
November 12, 2006

Houston Dynamo	1–1 (a.e.t.)	New England Revolution
Ching 114'	(Report)	Twellman 113'
Penalties
Gray (penalty scored); Holden (penalty scored); De Rosario (penalty scored); Davis (penalty missed); Ching (penalty scored)	4–3	(penalty scored) Joseph; (penalty scored) Reis; (penalty missed) Noonan; (penalty scored) Twellman; (penalty missed) Heaps

Pizza Hut Park
Frisco, Texas
Attendance: 22,427
Referee: Jair Marrufo

== Player statistics ==
=== Goals ===
Rank	Player	Club	Goals
1	(United States) Jeff Cunningham	Real Salt Lake	16
2	(Argentina) Christian Gómez	D.C. United	14
2	(United States) Ante Razov	Chivas USA	14
4	(Guatemala) Carlos Ruiz	FC Dallas	13
5	(United States) Landon Donovan	Los Angeles Galaxy	12
6	(Bolivia) Jaime Moreno	D.C. United	11
6	(Canada) Dwayne De Rosario	Houston Dynamo	11
6	(United States) Taylor Twellman	New England Revolution	11
6	(United States) Kenny Cooper	FC Dallas	11
6	(United States) Brian Ching	Houston Dynamo	11

=== Hat-tricks ===
Player	Club	Against	Result	Date
(United States) Brian Ching	Houston Dynamo	Colorado Rapids	5–2	April 2
(Haiti) Peguero Jean Philippe	New York Red Bulls	Chivas USA	5–4	May 20
(United States) Edson Buddle	New York Red Bulls	Real Salt Lake	6–0	August 26
(Honduras) Amado Guevara	New York Red Bulls	Kansas City Wizards	3–2	October 14

=== Assists ===
Rank	Player	Club	Assists
1	(United States) Brad Davis	Houston Dynamo	9
2	(United States) Jeff Cunningham	Real Salt Lake	8
2	(Argentina) Christian Gómez	D.C. United	8
2	(United States) José Burciaga Jr.	Kansas City Wizards	8
2	(United States) Justin Mapp	Chicago Fire	8
2	(United States) Carey Talley	Real Salt Lake	8
2	(Republic of Ireland) Ronnie O'Brien	FC Dallas	8
2	(England) Terry Cooke	Colorado Rapids	8
9	(United States) Landon Donovan	Los Angeles Galaxy	7
9	(Wales) Andy Dorman	New England Revolution	7
9	(United States) Sasha Victorine	Kansas City Wizards	7

=== Clean sheets ===
Rank	Player	Club	Clean sheets
1	(United States) Matt Reis	New England Revolution	10
2	(United States) Kevin Hartman	Los Angeles Galaxy	9
3	(United States) Troy Perkins	D.C. United	8
4	(United States) Joe Cannon	Colorado Rapids	7
4	(United States) Zach Thornton	Chicago Fire	7
6	(United States) Preston Burpo	Chivas USA	5
6	(United States) Jon Conway	New York Red Bulls	5
6	(United States) Brad Guzan	Chivas USA	5
6	(United States) Tony Meola	New York Red Bulls	5
6	(Canada) Pat Onstad	Houston Dynamo	5
6	(United States) Bo Oshoniyi	Kansas City Wizards	5
6	(Argentina) Darío Sala	FC Dallas	5

== Awards ==
=== Individual awards ===
Award	Player	Club
Most Valuable Player	(Argentina) Christian Gómez	D.C. United
Defender of the Year	(United States) Bobby Boswell	D.C. United
Goalkeeper of the Year	(United States) Troy Perkins	D.C. United
Coach of the Year	(United States) Bob Bradley	Chivas USA
Rookie of the Year	(United States) Jonathan Bornstein	Chivas USA
Comeback Player of the Year	(United States) Richard Mulrooney	FC Dallas
Golden Boot	(United States) Jeff Cunningham	Real Salt Lake
Goal of the Year	(United States) Brian Ching	Houston Dynamo
Fair Play Award	(United States) Chris Klein	Real Salt Lake
Humanitarian of the Year	(United States) Michael Parkhurst	New England Revolution

=== Best XI ===
Goalkeeper	Defenders	Midfielders	Forwards
(United States) Troy Perkins, D.C. United	(United States) Bobby Boswell, D.C. United (United States) José Burciaga Jr., Kansas City (United States) Jimmy Conrad, Kansas City	(United States) Ricardo Clark, Houston (United States) Clint Dempsey, New England (Canada) Dwayne De Rosario, Houston (Argentina) Christian Gómez, D.C. United (United States) Justin Mapp, Chicago	(United States) Jeff Cunningham, Salt Lake (Bolivia) Jaime Moreno, D.C. United

== Attendance ==
Club	Games	Total	Average
Los Angeles Galaxy	16	333,016	20,814
Chivas USA	16	317,432	19,840
Houston Dynamo	16	302,957	18,935
D.C. United	16	291,442	18,215
Real Salt Lake	16	261,855	16,366
FC Dallas	16	239,714	14,982
New York Red Bulls	16	233,112	14,570
Chicago Fire	16	225,775	14,111
Columbus Crew	16	212,699	13,294
Colorado Rapids	16	192,894	12,056
New England Revolution	16	188,569	11,786
Kansas City Wizards	16	177,322	11,083
Totals	192	2,976,787	15,504
