= Chad Prince =

American soccer player and coach

Personal information
- Full name: Chad Prince
- Date of birth: July 19, 1979 (age 47)
- Place of birth: Woodbury, New York, US
- Height: 5 ft 11 in (1.80 m)
- Position: Defender

Youth career
- 1993–1996: Syosset High School

College career
Years	Team	Apps	(Gls)
1997–2000	Virginia Cavaliers		

Senior career*
Years	Team	Apps	(Gls)
2001	Chicago Fire	1	(0)
2001–2002	Milwaukee Rampage		
- Austin Posse

International career^{‡}
- United States U16
- United States U17

Managerial career
- 2004: University of Texas-Austin (women's)
- 2008: Campbell University (women's assistant)
- –: Keystone College (men's and women's)
- –: St. Edward's University (goalkeeper coach)
- 2011–2014: Adelphi University (men's assistant)
- * Club domestic league appearances and goals as of 03:35, July 25, 2010 (UTC) ‡ National team caps and goals as of 03:35, July 25, 2010 (UTC)

Chad Prince (born July 19, 1979, in Woodbury, New York) is an American soccer coach and former professional player.

== Biography ==
=== College ===
Prince attended the University of Virginia where he majored in psychology. He later attended the University of Texas where he earned a master's degree in educational psychology. In 2015, he graduated from Adelphi University with an MS in Sport Management.

=== Professional career ===
After graduating from the University of Virginia, Prince signed with the Chicago Fire of Major League Soccer. Prince played in one regular season match for the Fire. He also played for the Milwaukee Rampage and Austin Posse in the A-League.

=== Coaching career ===
Prince's coaching career began in 2004 as the women's coach for the University of Texas - Austin. In 2008, he was named assistant for the Campbell University women's soccer team. He spent two years as head coach of both the men's and women's team at Keystone College, then had a stint as goalkeeper coach at St. Edward's University. He joined Adelphi University as an assistant for the men's team in 2011.

== Statistics ==
Club performance			League		Cup		League Cup		Continental		Total	
Season	Club	League	Apps	Goals	Apps	Goals	Apps	Goals	Apps	Goals	Apps	Goals
USA			League		Open Cup		League Cup		North America		Total	
2001	Chicago Fire	MLS	1	0	-	-	-	-	-	-	-	-
2001	Milwaukee Rampage	A-League	-	-	-	-	-	-	-	-	-	-
Career total			1	0	-	-	-	-	-	-	-	-
