= Scott Bower =

American retired soccer midfielder

Personal information
- Date of birth: June 27, 1978 (age 48)
- Place of birth: Port Angeles, Washington, U.S.
- Height: 5 ft 8 in (1.73 m)
- Position: Midfielder

College career
| Years | Team | Apps | (Gls) |
| 1996–1997 | Stetson Hatters | | |
| 1998 | Clemson Tigers | 24 | (9) |

Senior career*
| Years | Team | Apps | (Gls) |
| 1999–2002 | San Jose Earthquakes | 41 | (0) |
| 2000 | → MLS Pro-40 (loan) | 14 | (2) |
| 2001 | → Seattle Sounders (loan) | 1 | (0) |
| 2002 | → Portland Timbers (loan) | 4 | (0) |
| Total | | 60 | (2) |
- * Club domestic league appearances and goals

Scott Bower (June 27, 1978) is an American former professional soccer player who played as a midfielder.

Bower spent his entire professional career, barring loan spells, playing for Major League Soccer club San Jose Earthquakes.

== Youth ==
Bower grew up in Florida where he played for the Florida State U-17 soccer champion with the Tampa Bay Kickers. In 1996, he graduated from Gaither High School where he was an All State soccer player. Bower began his collegiate career with Stetson University from 1996 to 1997. In August 1997, he also played for the Clearwater Chargers who won the U-19 US Youth Soccer National Championships. He then transferred to Clemson University where he played his junior season in 1998. Clemson was ranked number one in the Country for most of the season, only losing one game. In the Atlantic Coast Conference final, Bower scored the game-winning goal over the Duke Blue Devils.

== Professional ==
In February 1999, Bower left college and signed a Project-40 contract with Major League Soccer. The league assigned Bower to San Jose Earthquakes. In July 2002, he played four games on loan to Portland Timbers of the A-League. Bower was waived by the Earthquakes at the end of the 2002 season and went on trial with LA Galaxy during the 2003 preseason, but couldn't secure a contract and retired shortly after.
