= Wade Barrett (soccer) =

American soccer player (born 1976)

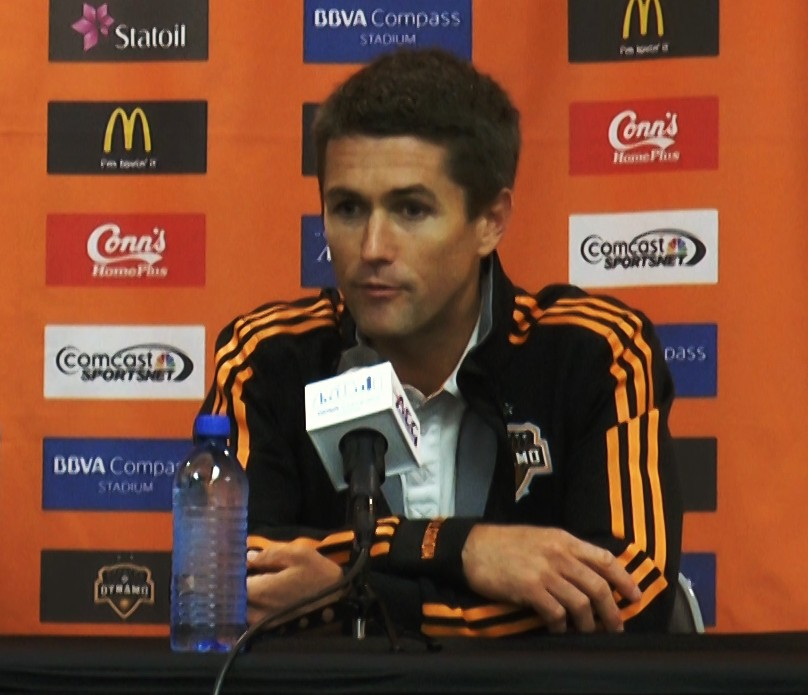
- Wade Barrett in 2013

Personal information
- Full name: Wade Barrett
- Date of birth: June 23, 1976 (age 50)
- Place of birth: Virginia Beach, Virginia, U.S.
- Height: 5 ft 8 in (1.73 m)
- Position: Left back

College career
Years	Team	Apps	(Gls)
1994–1997	William & Mary Tribe		

Senior career*
Years	Team	Apps	(Gls)
1998–2002	San Jose Earthquakes	112	(5)
1998	→ San Francisco Seals (loan)	1	(0)
2002–2004	AGF	31	(0)
2004	→ Fredrikstad (loan)	8	(0)
2005	San Jose Earthquakes	30	(1)
2006–2009	Houston Dynamo	99	(0)
Total		281	(6)

International career
2002–2007	United States	2	(0)

Managerial career
- 2010–2016: Houston Dynamo (assistant)
- 2016: Houston Dynamo (interim)
- * Club domestic league appearances and goals

Wade Barrett (born June 23, 1976) is an American former soccer player. He was most recently the interim head coach of the Houston Dynamo in Major League Soccer.

== Career ==
=== College ===
Barrett was born in Virginia Beach, Virginia, and played college soccer at the College of William and Mary from 1994 to 1997, where he scored thirty-eight goals and twenty-six assists, and was voted an NSCAA All-American in his senior season.

=== Professional ===
Barrett was drafted twelfth overall in the 1998 MLS College Draft by the then-San Jose Clash. Barrett was a consistent contributor for the Earthquakes in his first two seasons, being slowly converted from a midfielder to a defender, but was sidelined by groin injuries in the 2000 season that forced him to miss much of the year. Barrett returned in 2001 and proved himself to be one of the best defenders in MLS, playing left back for a San Jose team that would win the 2001 MLS Cup. Barrett cemented his position in 2002, continuing his exceptional play at left fullback, and in recognition was named to the 2002 MLS Best XI. In five years in the league, he scored five goals and made twenty-two assists.

Barrett left MLS after the 2002 season to pursue opportunities in the United Kingdom. Barrett first signed with Danish club AGF Aarhus, with whom he spent the latter half of 2002 and much of 2003, but was unable to establish himself as a regular starter. Barrett opted to leave the club in July 2004 in order to join Fredrikstad FK in Norway, joining fellow American Brian West.

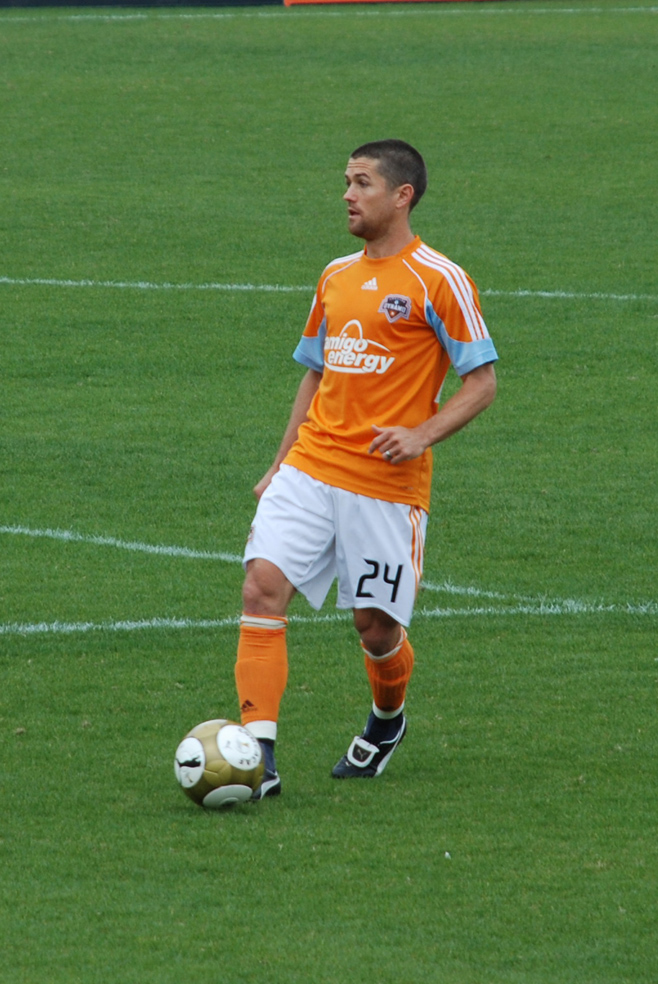
Wade Barrett during his playing career for the Houston Dynamo.

He left Scandinavia in January 2005, re-signing with San Jose and winning the MLS Supporter's Shield in his first season back. Along with the rest of his teammates, he moved to Houston to become part of the Dynamo for the 2006 season.

In each of the Dynamo's first two seasons, Barrett and his teammates finished second in the Western Conference but won the MLS Cup championship. As the Dynamo's captain, Barrett lifted the championship trophy each year. He played in sixty-one of the team's sixty-two regular season games in its first two seasons.

Barrett retired prior to the start of the 2010 season, and transitioned into an assistant coaching role for Dynamo. As of June 7, 2016, Barrett has been named the interim head coach of Dynamo for the remainder of the 2016 season.

=== International ===
As of March 2007, Barrett has earned two caps for the U.S. national team, the first one coming November 17, 2002, against El Salvador. He was called into camp for the U.S. for an October 8, 2005, World Cup qualifier against Costa Rica, but suffered a hamstring injury in training that prevented him from appearing in the match. In March 2007, Barrett was again called into camp for the national team in preparation for friendlies against Ecuador and Guatemala, and was brought into the game against Guatemala as a second-half substitute.

== Honors ==
=== San Jose Earthquakes ===
- MLS Cup (1): 2001
- MLS Supporter's Shield (1): 2005

=== Houston Dynamo ===
- MLS Cup (2): 2006, 2007

=== Houston Dynamo ===
- MLS Best XI: 2002

Sporting positions
Preceded by Jeff Agoos	San Jose Earthquakes captain 2005	Succeeded by Nick Garcia
Preceded by N/A	Houston Dynamo captain 2006–2009	Succeeded by Brian Ching
