= Richard Mulrooney =

American soccer player (born 1976)

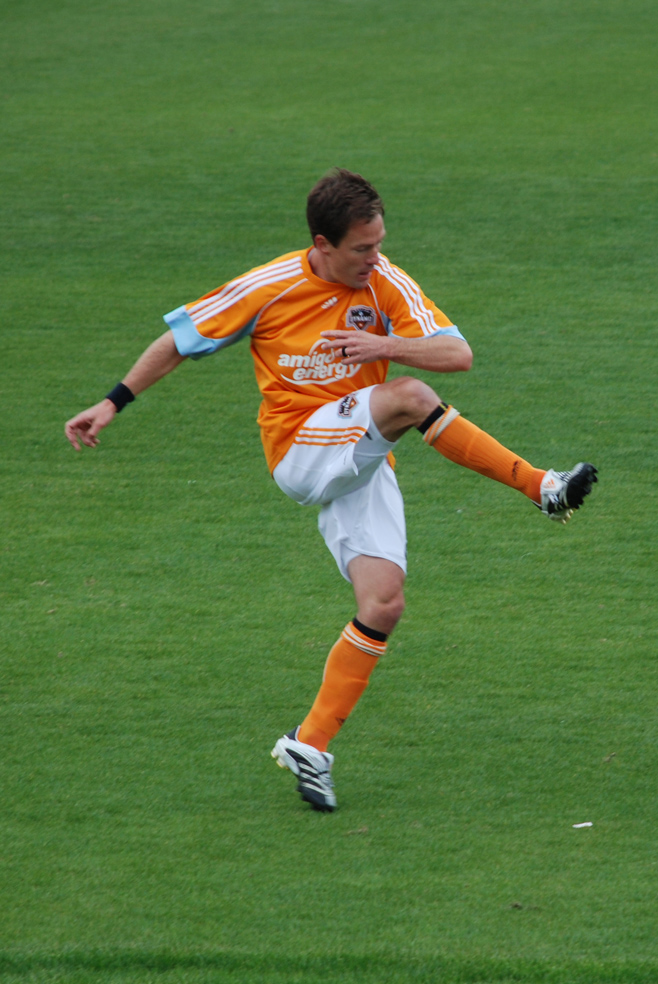

Personal information
- Date of birth: November 3, 1976 (age 49)
- Place of birth: Memphis, Tennessee, United States
- Height: 5 ft 9 in (1.75 m)
- Positions: Midfielder; defender

College career
Years	Team	Apps	(Gls)
1995–1998	Creighton Bluejays		

Senior career*
Years	Team	Apps	(Gls)
1995–1998	Nashville Metros	14	(?)
1999–2004	San Jose Earthquakes	173	(4)
2005–2006	FC Dallas	32	(3)
2007	Toronto FC	2	(0)
2007–2010	Houston Dynamo	88	(1)
Total		295	(8)

International career
2001–2004	United States	14	(0)

Managerial career
- 2012–2014: Memphis Tigers (assistant)
- 2014–: Memphis Tigers
Medal record
Representing United States
Third place	CONCACAF Gold Cup	2003
Men's Soccer
- * Club domestic league appearances and goals

Richard Mulrooney (born November 3, 1976) is an American former soccer player. He is the current men's head soccer coach at the University of Memphis.

== Career ==
=== College ===
Mulrooney played four years of college soccer at Creighton University, where he recorded 51 assists from 1995 to 1998. While there, he helped lead the team to the NCAA Final Four in 1996, and was named an NCAA All-American as a senior.

=== Professional ===
Upon graduating, Mulrooney was drafted third overall in the 1999 MLS College Draft by the San Jose Clash. Mulrooney immediately earned himself a place in the Clash's starting lineup, starting 25 games while scoring one goal and 3 assists as a rookie. Mulrooney has since established himself as one of the most important players on the team, playing in 163 games and adding 44 assists while orchestrating the team's offense (both numbers are club records). He left the Quakes before the 2005 season, traded to Dallas in a large deal that included Arturo Alvarez and Brad Davis.

Mulrooney helped form the core of the FC Dallas squad that began the 2005 season in first place, but Mulrooney tore his ACL May 14, 2005 and missed the remainder of the season. He came back to become a regular for Dallas in 2006 and was named as a commissioner's pick to the 2006 MLS All-Star game, starting as the MLS All-Stars beat Chelsea 1–0.

On March 20, 2007, Mulrooney was traded to expansion MLS club Toronto FC, in exchange for a partial allocation and a 2008 SuperDraft first-round pick. On April 18, after only two games with TFC, he was sent to the Houston Dynamo for Kevin Goldthwaite and a 2008 first-round pick.

Mulrooney played every game the remainder of the season for the Dynamo and tied for the team lead with five assists. He also set up Nate Jaqua for the first goal in the Western Conference final against Kansas City. The Dynamo's 2007 MLS Cup championship was Mulrooney's third league championship.

After the 2010 MLS season Houston declined Mulrooney's contract option and he elected to participate in the 2010 MLS Re-Entry Draft. Mulrooney became a free agent in Major League Soccer when he was not selected in the Re-Entry draft.

=== International ===
Despite his success in MLS, Mulrooney has struggled to earn time for the US national team, as Claudio Reyna, John O'Brien, Pablo Mastroeni and Chris Armas play his position. Mulrooney earned his first cap on December 9, 2001, as a substitute against South Korea. In a friendly match versus Ireland in Dublin during the lead-up to the tournament there was a torrential downpour which severely hampered play. Since then, he has played a total of 14 games, but has not played a major role with the team.

=== Coaching ===
In 2012 Mulrooney joined the University of Memphis soccer staff, Mulrooney is the Assistant coach under HC Richie Grant.

On February 25, 2014, Mulrooney was named the new head coach at the University of Memphis.

== Honors ==
=== Club ===
==== San Jose Earthquakes ====
- Major League Soccer MLS Cup (2): 2001, 2003
- Major League Soccer Western Conference Championship (1): 2003

==== Houston Dynamo ====
- Major League Soccer MLS Cup (1): 2007
- Major League Soccer Western Conference Championship (1): 2007

=== Individual ===
- MLS Comeback Player of the Year (1): 2006
