= List of Houston Dynamo Homegrown Players =

This list comprises all players who signed a Homegrown Player contract with the Houston Dynamo. Stats are for MLS regular season games only.

Players in Bold are still on the roster. As of November 5, 2021

Name	Nationality	Position	Years w/ Dynamo	Appearances	Goals	Assists	Refs
Bradley Bourgeois	United States	DF	2016	0	0	0	
**Juan Castilla**	Colombia	MF	2021–	2	0	0	
Tyler Deric	United States	GK	2009–2019	90	0	0	
Alex Dixon	United States	MF	2011–2013	13	1	0	
Christian Lucatero	United States	MF	2016–2017	0	0	0	
**Eric McCue**	Sweden	DF	2019–	0	0	0	
Francisco Navas	United States	MF	2010– 2011	1	0	0	
**Marcelo Palomino**	United States	MF	2020–	3	0	0	
**Danny Ríos**	El Salvador	FW	2021–	0	0	0	
**Memo Rodríguez**	United States	MF	2015, 2017–	106	17	11	
Bryan Salazar	United States	MF	2013–2014	0	0	0	
Josue Soto	United States	MF	2011–2012	0	0	0	
