= List of Houston Dynamo FC seasons =

This is a list of seasons played by Houston Dynamo FC in American (Major League Soccer) and CONCACAF soccer, from 2006 (when the San Jose Earthquakes players and coaches were relocated to Houston) to the most recent completed season. It details the club's achievements in major competitions, and the top scorers for the team in each season.

== Key ==
Key to competitions

- Major League Soccer (MLS) – The top-flight of soccer in the United States, established in 1996.
- U.S. Open Cup (USOC) – The premier knockout cup competition in U.S. soccer, first contested in 1914.
- CONCACAF Champions League (CCL) – The premier competition in North American soccer since 1962. It went by the name of Champions' Cup until 2008.

Key to colors and symbols

1st or W	Winners
2nd or RU	Runners-up
3rd	Third place
Last	Wooden Spoon
♦	MLS Golden Boot
	Highest average attendance
Italics	Ongoing competition

Key to league record

- Season = The year and article of the season
- Div = Division/level on pyramid
- League = League name
- Pld = Games played
- W = Games won
- L = Games lost
- D = Games drawn
- GF = Goals for
- GA = Goals against
- GD = Goal difference
- Pts = Points
- PPG = Points per game
- Conf. = Conference position
- Overall = League position

Key to cup record

- DNE = Did not enter
- DNQ = Did not qualify
- NH = Competition not held or canceled
- QR = Qualifying round
- PR = Preliminary round
- GS = Group stage
- R1 = First round
- R2 = Second round
- R3 = Third round
- R4 = Fourth round
- R5 = Fifth round
- Ro16 = Round of 16
- QF = Quarterfinals
- SF = Semifinals
- F = Final
- RU = Runners-up
- W = Winners

== Seasons ==
Season	League										Position		Playoffs	USOC	Continental / Other		Average attendance (Note: Average attendance only includes statistics from regular season matches.)	Top goalscorer(s) (Note: Top goalscorer(s) includes all goals scored in the regular season, MLS Cup Playoffs, U.S. Open Cup, MLS is Back Tournament, CONCACAF Champions League, FIFA Club World Cup, and other competitive continental matches.)	
Season	League	Pld	W	L	D	GF	GA	GD	Pts	PPG	Conf.	Overall	Playoffs	USOC	Continental / Other		Average attendance	Name(s)	Goals
2006	MLS	32	11	8	13	44	40	+4	46	1.44	2nd	5th	W	SF	DNQ		18,935	(United States) Brian Ching	14
2007	MLS	30	15	8	7	43	23	+20	52	1.73	2nd	3rd	W	Ro16	CONCACAF Champions' Cup North American SuperLiga	SF SF	15,883	(United States) Brian Ching	12
2008	MLS	30	13	5	12	45	32	+13	51	1.70	1st	2nd	QF	Ro16	CONCACAF Champions' Cup North American SuperLiga CONCACAF Champions League	SF RU QF	16,939	(United States) Brian Ching	14
2009	MLS	30	13	8	9	39	29	+10	48	1.60	2nd	3rd	SF	SF	CONCACAF Champions League	GS	17,047	(United States) Brian Ching	10
2010	MLS	30	9	15	6	40	49	–9	33	1.10	7th	12th	DNQ	QF	North American SuperLiga	SF	17,310	(United States) Brian Ching	7
2011	MLS	34	12	9	13	45	41	+4	49	1.44	2nd	6th	RU	QR2	DNQ		17,694	(United States) Brian Ching	6
2012	MLS	34	14	9	11	48	41	+7	53	1.56	5th	9th	RU	R3	CONCACAF Champions League	QF	20,985	(United States) Will Bruin	16
2013	MLS	34	14	11	9	41	41	0	51	1.50	4th	9th	SF	Ro16	CONCACAF Champions League	GS	19,923	(Jamaica) Giles Barnes (United States) Will Bruin	10
2014	MLS	34	11	17	6	39	58	–19	39	1.15	8th	14th	DNQ	Ro16	DNQ		20,117	(Jamaica) Giles Barnes	12
2015	MLS	34	11	14	9	42	49	–7	42	1.24	8th	15th	DNQ	QF	DNQ		20,618	(United States) Will Bruin	12
2016	MLS	34	7	14	13	39	45	–6	34	1.00	10th	19th	DNQ	QF	DNQ		19,021	(Colombia) Mauro Manotas	9
2017	MLS	34	13	10	11	57	45	+12	50	1.47	4th	10th	SF	Ro16	DNQ		17,623	(Mexico) Erick Torres	14
2018	MLS	34	10	16	8	58	58	0	38	1.12	9th	17th	DNQ	W	DNQ		16,906	(Colombia) Mauro Manotas	25
2019	MLS	34	12	18	4	49	59	–10	40	1.17	10th	19th	DNQ	Ro16	CONCACAF Champions League Leagues Cup	QF QF	15,674	(Colombia) Mauro Manotas	15
2020	MLS	23	4	10	9	30	40	–10	21	0.91	12th	25th	DNQ	NH	MLS is Back Tournament	GS	5,279	(Colombia) Darwin Quintero	7
2021	MLS	34	6	16	12	36	54	–18	30	0.88	13th	25th	DNQ	NH	DNQ		12,220	(United States) Fafà Picault	11
2022	MLS	34	10	18	6	43	56	–13	36	1.06	13th	25th	DNQ	Ro16	DNQ		16,426	(Paraguay) Sebastián Ferreira	14
2023	MLS	34	14	11	9	51	38	+13	51	1.50	4th	9th	SF	W	Leagues Cup	Ro16	15,029	(Morocco) Amine Bassi	10
2024	MLS	34	15	10	9	47	39	+8	54	1.59	5th	8th	R1	Ro32	CONCACAF Champions Cup Leagues Cup	Ro16 Ro32	17,038	(Nigeria) Ibrahim Aliyu	6
2025	MLS	34	9	15	10	43	56	–13	37	1.09	12th	22nd	DNQ	Ro16	Leagues Cup	League phase	17,693	(Argentina) Ezequiel Ponce	12
Total		651	223	242	186	879	893	–14	855	1.31	—	—	—	—	—		—	(United States) Brian Ching	69
