= 2010 Houston Dynamo season =

Houston Dynamo
2010 season
- Owner: Philip Anschutz (AEG)
- COO: Chris Canetti
- Head coach: Dominic Kinnear
- Stadium: Robertson Stadium
- Major League Soccer: Conference: 7th Overall: 12th
- MLS Cup Playoffs: Did not qualify
- U.S. Open Cup: Quarterfinals
- SuperLiga: Semifinals
- Texas Derby: Runners-up
- Top goalscorer: League: Brian Ching 7 goals All: Brian Ching; Dominic Oduro 7 goals each
- Average home league attendance: 17,310
| Home colors | Away colors |

The 2010 Houston Dynamo season was the fifth season of the team's existence since joining Major League Soccer (MLS) prior to the 2006 season. It was the team's fifth season with head coach Dominic Kinnear, majority owner Philip Anschultz, and chief operating officer Chris Canetti. On June 10, team president Oliver Luck left the Dynamo to become athletic director for his alma mater, West Virginia University.

This Dynamo failed to qualify for the MLS Cup Playoffs for the first time in franchise history during the 2010 season, finishing 7th in the Western Conference, 1 place and 13 points below the final playoff spot. In the U.S. Open Cup, Houston reached the quarterfinals, where they lost 3–1 to Chivas USA. The Dynamo finished top of their group in the North American SuperLiga, before losing 1–0 to Monarcas Morelia in the semifinals.

On July 28, the Dynamo hosted the 2010 MLS All-Star Game at Reliant Stadium, where the MLS All-Stars lost 5–2 to Manchester United.

== Final roster ==
As of October 24, 2010.

Appearances and goals are totals for MLS regular season only.

| No. | Name | Nationality | Position | Date of birth (Age) | Joined from | Joined in | Apps. | Goals |
Goalkeepers
| 1 | Tally Hall | (United States) | GK | May 12, 1985 (25) | Esbjerg fB | 2009 | 5 | 0 |
| 18 | Pat Onstad | (Canada) | GK | January 13, 1968 (42) | San Jose Earthquakes | 2006 | 136 | 0 |
| 30 | Tyler Deric (HGP) | (United States) | GK | August 30, 1988 (22) | Houston Dynamo Academy | 2009 | 2 | 0 |
Defenders
| 2 | Eddie Robinson | (United States) | DF | June 19, 1978 (32) | San Jose Earthquakes | 2006 | 94 | 5 |
| 4 | Ryan Cochrane | (United States) | DF | August 8, 1983 (27) | San Jose Earthquakes | 2009 | 70 | 2 |
| 8 | Richard Mulrooney | (United States) | DF | November 3, 1976 (33) | Toronto FC | 2007 | 88 | 1 |
| 31 | André Hainault | (Canada) | DF | June 17, 1986 (24) | FK Baník Most | 2009 | 48 | 3 |
| 32 | Bobby Boswell | (United States) | DF | March 15, 1983 (27) | D.C. United | 2008 | 84 | 2 |
| 51 | Adrian Serioux | (Canada) | DF | May 12, 1979 (31) | Toronto FC | 2010 | 33 | 3 |
Midfielders
| 5 | Danny Cruz (GA) | (United States) | MF | January 3, 1990 (20) | UNLV | 2009 | 31 | 2 |
| 7 | Colin Clark | (United States) | MF | April 11, 1984 (26) | Colorado Rapids | 2010 | 0 | 0 |
| 11 | Brad Davis | (United States) | MF | November 8, 1981 (28) | San Jose Earthquakes | 2006 | 125 | 17 |
| 13 | Francisco Navas Cobo (HGP) | (United States) | MF | November 17, 1991 (18) | Houston Dynamo Academy | 2010 | 1 | 0 |
| 17 | Mike Chabala | (United States) | MF | May 24, 1984 (26) | University of Washington | 2006 | 40 | 1 |
| 20 | Geoff Cameron | (United States) | MF | July 11, 1985 (25) | University of Rhode Island | 2008 | 68 | 6 |
| 22 | Lovel Palmer | (Jamaica) | MF | August 30, 1984 (26) | Harbour View | 2010 | 26 | 2 |
| 26 | Corey Ashe | (United States) | MF | March 14, 1986 (24) | University of North Carolina | 2007 | 98 | 1 |
| 27 | Samuel Appiah | (Ghana) | MF | March 25, 1985 (25) | Boston University | 2010 | 2 | 1 |
| 35 | Anthony Obodai | (Ghana) | MF | August 6, 1982 (28) | RKC Waalwijk | 2010 | 4 | 0 |
Forwards
| 15 | Cam Weaver | (United States) | FW | June 10, 1983 (27) | San Jose Earthquakes | 2009 | 22 | 6 |
| 23 | Dominic Oduro | (Ghana) | FW | August 13, 1985 (25) | New York Red Bulls | 2009 | 43 | 6 |
| 25 | Brian Ching (C) | (United States) | FW | May 24, 1978 (31) | San Jose Earthquakes | 2006 | 105 | 46 |
| 33 | Joseph Ngwenya | (Zimbabwe) | FW | March 30, 1981 (29) | Antalyaspor | 2010 | 37 | 8 |

== Player movement ==
=== In ===
Per Major League Soccer and club policies terms of the deals do not get disclosed.

| Date | Player | Position | Age | Previous club | Notes | Ref |
|---|---|---|---|---|---|---|
| January 21, 2010 | (Canada) Kevin Harmse | MF | 25 | (United States) Chivas USA | Acquired in exchange for a conditional third or fourth-round pick in the 2012 MLS SuperDraft. | |
| March 9, 2010 | (United States) Francisco Navas Cobo | MF | 18 | (United States) Houston Dynamo Academy | Signed as a homegrown player. | |
| March 12, 2010 | (Canada) Adrian Serioux | DF | 30 | (Canada) Toronto FC | Acquired in exchange for a third-round pick in the 2011 MLS SuperDraft. | |
| March 19, 2010 | (Jamaica) Lovel Palmer | MF | 25 | (Jamaica) Harbour View | Full transfer, fee undisclosed. | |
| April 13, 2010 | (Zimbabwe) Joseph Ngwenya | FW | 29 | (Turkey) Antalyaspor | Signed on a free transfer. After Antalyaspor refused to turn over Ngwenya's International Transfer Certificate, FIFA ruled him eligible to join Houston on May 20. | |
| July 13, 2010 | (Ghana) Anthony Obodai | MF | 27 | (Netherlands) RKC Waalwijk | Signed on a free transfer. | |
| September 15, 2010 | (United States) Colin Clark | MF | 26 | (United States) Colorado Rapids | Acquired along with allocation money in exchange for Brian Mullan and a fourth-round pick in the 2013 MLS SuperDraft. | |

=== Out ===
Per Major League Soccer and club policies terms of the deals do not get disclosed.

| Date | Player | Position | Age | Destination Club | Notes | Ref |
|---|---|---|---|---|---|---|
| November 25, 2009 | (United States) John Michael Hayden | MF | 25 | (United States) Louisville Lightning | Waived following the 2009 season. | |
| November 25, 2009 | (United States) Abe Thompson | FW | 27 | (United States) Real Salt Lake | Waived following the 2009 season. | |
| December 31, 2009 | (United States) Ricardo Clark | MF | 26 | (Germany) Eintracht Frankfurt | Contract expired/free transfer | |
| December 31, 2009 | (United States) Stuart Holden | MF | 24 | (England) Bolton Wanderers | Contract expired/free transfer | |
| March 9, 2010 | (Canada) Kevin Harmse | MF | 25 | (Canada) Vancouver Whitecaps FC | Released | |
| March 24, 2010 | (United States) Erik Ustruck | MF | 25 | (United States) FC Tampa Bay | Released | |
| March 25, 2010 | (United States) Wade Barrett | DF | 33 | Retired | Joined the Dynamo coaching staff after retiring. | |
| July 13, 2010 | (Mexico) Luis Ángel Landín | FW | 24 | (Mexico) Atlante | Released | |
| July 26, 2010 | (United States) Craig Waibel | DF | 34 | Retired | Released | |
| September 15, 2010 | (United States) Brian Mullan | MF | 32 | (United States) Colorado Rapids | Traded along with a fourth-round pick in the 2013 MLS SuperDraft for Colin Clark and allocation money. | |

=== MLS SuperDraft ===
| Round | Pick | Player | Position | Age | College | Notes | Ref |
|---|---|---|---|---|---|---|---|
| 3 | 43 | David Walker | MF | 22 | UC Santa Barbara | Did not sign with the Dynamo, retired. | |
| 3 | 46 | Samuel Appiah | MF | 24 | Boston University | | |
| 4 | 56 | Euan Holden | DF | 21 | New Mexico | Signed with Vejle Boldklub. | |

== Coaching staff ==
As of October 24, 2010.

| Position | Name |
|---|---|
| Head coach | (United States) Dominic Kinnear |
| Assistant coach | (United States) Wade Barrett |
| Assistant coach | (United States) Steve Ralston |
| Goalkeeper coach | (United States) Tim Hanley |
| Head athletic trainer | (United States) Theron Enns |
| Assistant athletic trainer | (United States) Shane Caron |
| Team administrator | (United States) Nick Kowba |
| Equipment manager | (United States) Michael Porter |

== Pre-season and friendlies ==
=== Pro Soccer Classic ===
Win Tie Loss

| February 25, 2010 Semifinals | Houston Dynamo | 0–0 (a.e.t.) (5–6 p) | New York Red Bulls | Orlando, Florida |
| 8:00 PM CST | Maciel (yellow card) 90' | report | Petke (yellow card) 58'; Lindpere (yellow card) 90+1' | Stadium: ESPN Wide World of Sports Complex; Attendance: 1,110 |
| | Penalties |
| | Barrett (penalty scored); Oduro (penalty scored); Cruz (penalty scored); Maciel (penalty scored); Ustruck (penalty scored); Cameron (penalty missed) | | Ángel (penalty scored); Lindpere (penalty scored); Ubiparipović (penalty scored); Ream (penalty scored); Miller (penalty scored) da Luz (penalty scored) |

| February 27, 2010 Third place match | Houston Dynamo | 2–1 | FC Dallas | Orlando, Florida |
| 8:00 PM CST | Palmer 16'; Weaver 53' | report | Ferreira 13'; Edward (yellow card) 42'; Alexander (yellow card) 84' | Stadium: ESPN Wide World of Sports Complex; Attendance: 1,500 |

=== Friendlies ===
| March 7, 2010 | Houston Dynamo | 1–1 | Austin Aztex | Houston, Texas |
| 1:00 PM CST | Palmer (yellow card) 60'; Ustruck 86' | Report | Powers (yellow card) 60'; Boswell 74' (o.g) | Stadium: Carl Lewis Track & Field Complex |

| March 11, 2010 | Houston Dynamo | 1–1 | Chicago Fire | Houston, Texas |
| 7:00 PM CST | Robinson (yellow card) 15' (yellow-red card) 74'; Mullan (yellow card) 55'; Weaver 63'; Chabala (yellow card) 68' | Report | Pappa (yellow card) 70' (yellow-red card) 85' (goal) 71'; Brown (yellow card) 73'; Umanzor (red card) 77' | Stadium: Sorrells Field |

| March 14, 2010 | Austin Aztex | 0–1 | Houston Dynamo | Austin, Texas |
| 5:00 PM CDT | Olum (yellow card) 44' | Report | Cameron 83' | Stadium: Nelson Field |

| March 17, 2010 | San Jose Earthquakes | 0–0 | Houston Dynamo | San Francisco, California |
| 9:30 PM CDT | Glen (yellow card) 78' | report | Landín (yellow card) 42' | Stadium: Kezar Stadium; Attendance: 2,116; Referee: Tyler Ploeger |

| March 20, 2010 | Chivas USA | 1–3 | Houston Dynamo | Santa Barbara, California |
| 9:30 PM CDT | Cuesta 83'; Cuesta (yellow card) 86'; Jazic (yellow card) 88' | Report | Ching (yellow card) 45'; Oduro 51'; Davis 59'; Serioux 87' | Stadium: Harder Stadium; Attendance: 1,657; Referee: Ashbir Singh |

| June 10, 2010 | Houston Dynamo | 2–1 | Laredo Heat | Corpus Christi, Texas |
| 7:00 PM CDT | Robinson (yellow card) 33'; Chabala (yellow card) 36' (yellow-red card) 41'; Davis 68' (pen.); Waibel (yellow card) 82'; Oduro 85' | Report | Garcia 2'; Lewis (yellow card) 14' (yellow-red card) 17'; Perez (yellow card) 17'; Galvan (red card) 41' | Stadium: Whataburger Field; Attendance: 6,111; Referee: Carlos Salas |

| June 20, 2010 Dynamo Charities Cup | Houston Dynamo | 4–0 | C.D. Águila | Houston, Texas |
| 7:00 PM CDT | Ngwenya 16'; Ashe 28'; Oduro 67'; Landín 74' (pen.); Palmer (yellow card) 75' | Report | | Stadium: Robertson Stadium; Attendance: 11,843; Referee: Landis Wiley |

== Competitions ==
=== Major League Soccer ===
==== Standings ====
===== Western Conference =====
| Pos | Team | Pld | W | L | T | GF | GA | GD | Pts | Qualification |
|---|---|---|---|---|---|---|---|---|---|---|
| 1 | LA Galaxy | 30 | 18 | 7 | 5 | 44 | 26 | +18 | 59 | MLS Cup Playoffs |
| 2 | Real Salt Lake | 30 | 15 | 4 | 11 | 45 | 20 | +25 | 56 | MLS Cup Playoffs |
| 3 | FC Dallas | 30 | 12 | 4 | 14 | 42 | 28 | +14 | 50 | MLS Cup Playoffs |
| 4 | Seattle Sounders FC | 30 | 14 | 10 | 6 | 39 | 35 | +4 | 48 | MLS Cup Playoffs |
| 5 | Colorado Rapids | 30 | 12 | 8 | 10 | 44 | 32 | +12 | 46 | MLS Cup Playoffs |
| 6 | San Jose Earthquakes | 30 | 13 | 10 | 7 | 34 | 33 | +1 | 46 | MLS Cup Playoffs |
| 7 | Houston Dynamo | 30 | 9 | 15 | 6 | 40 | 49 | −9 | 33 | |
| 8 | Chivas USA | 30 | 8 | 18 | 4 | 31 | 45 | −14 | 28 | |

Source: MLS

===== Overall =====
| Pos | Team | Pld | W | L | T | GF | GA | GD | Pts | Qualification |
|---|---|---|---|---|---|---|---|---|---|---|
| 1 | LA Galaxy (S) | 30 | 18 | 7 | 5 | 44 | 26 | +18 | 59 | CONCACAF Champions League |
| 2 | Real Salt Lake | 30 | 15 | 4 | 11 | 45 | 20 | +25 | 56 | |
| 3 | New York Red Bulls | 30 | 15 | 9 | 6 | 38 | 29 | +9 | 51 | |
| 4 | FC Dallas | 30 | 12 | 4 | 14 | 42 | 28 | +14 | 50 | CONCACAF Champions League |
| 5 | Columbus Crew | 30 | 14 | 8 | 8 | 40 | 34 | +6 | 50 | |
| 6 | Seattle Sounders FC | 30 | 14 | 10 | 6 | 39 | 35 | +4 | 48 | CONCACAF Champions League |
| 7 | Colorado Rapids (C) | 30 | 12 | 8 | 10 | 44 | 32 | +12 | 46 | CONCACAF Champions League |
| 8 | San Jose Earthquakes | 30 | 13 | 10 | 7 | 34 | 33 | +1 | 46 | |
| 9 | Kansas City Wizards | 30 | 11 | 13 | 6 | 36 | 35 | +1 | 39 | |
| 10 | Chicago Fire | 30 | 9 | 12 | 9 | 37 | 38 | −1 | 36 | |
| 11 | Toronto FC | 30 | 9 | 13 | 8 | 33 | 41 | −8 | 35 | CONCACAF Champions League |
| 12 | Houston Dynamo | 30 | 9 | 15 | 6 | 40 | 49 | −9 | 33 | |
| 13 | New England Revolution | 30 | 9 | 16 | 5 | 32 | 50 | −18 | 32 | |
| 14 | Philadelphia Union | 30 | 8 | 15 | 7 | 35 | 49 | −14 | 31 | |
| 15 | Chivas USA | 30 | 8 | 18 | 4 | 31 | 45 | −14 | 28 | |
| 16 | D.C. United | 30 | 6 | 20 | 4 | 21 | 47 | −26 | 22 | |

Source: MLS
Rules for classification: 1) points; 2) head-to-head record; 3) goal difference; 4) number of goals scored
(C) Champions; (S) Supporters' Shield

==== Results summary ====
| Overall | | | | | | | | Home | | | | | | Away | | | | | |
| Pld | Pts | W | L | T | GF | GA | GD | W | L | T | GF | GA | GD | W | L | T | GF | GA | GD |
|---|---|---|---|---|---|---|---|---|---|---|---|---|---|---|---|---|---|---|---|
| 30 | 33 | 9 | 15 | 6 | 40 | 49 | −9 | 6 | 6 | 3 | 25 | 21 | +4 | 3 | 9 | 3 | 15 | 28 | −13 |

Last updated: October 25, 2010
Source: FBref.com
Pld = Matches played; Pts = Points; W = Matches won; T = Matches tied; L = Matches lost; GF = Goals for; GA = Goals against; GD = Goal difference

==== Results by round ====
| Round | 1 | 2 | 3 | 4 | 5 | 6 | 7 | 8 | 9 | 10 | 11 | 12 | 13 | 14 | 15 | 16 | 17 | 18 | 19 | 20 | 21 | 22 | 23 | 24 | 25 | 26 | 27 | 28 | 29 | 30 |
|---|---|---|---|---|---|---|---|---|---|---|---|---|---|---|---|---|---|---|---|---|---|---|---|---|---|---|---|---|---|---|
| Stadium | A | H | H | H | A | H | H | A | A | H | H | A | A | H | A | H | A | H | A | A | H | A | H | A | H | A | A | H | A | H |
| Result | T | W | L | W | L | W | L | W | L | W | L | W | L | T | T | T | L | T | L | L | W | L | L | L | L | W | T | L | W | W |
| Position | 8 | 5 | 10 | 5 | 9 | 5 | 6 | 6 | 7 | 6 | 8 | 10 | 10 | 9 | 10 | 10 | 11 | 12 | 12 | 13 | 12 | 13 | 15 | 15 | 15 | 13 | 13 | 15 | 14 | 12 |

Updated to match(es) played on October 24, 2010. Source: Major League Soccer
A = Away; H = Home; W = Win; L = Loss; T = Tie

==== Match results ====
| March 27, 2010 1 Texas Derby | FC Dallas | 1–1 | Houston Dynamo | Frisco, Texas |
| 3:00 PM CDT | McCarty (yellow card) 33'; Harris 38'; Harris (yellow card) 45' | Report | Chabala 36'; Boswell (yellow card) 57' | Stadium: Pizza Hut Park; Attendance: 8,016; Referee: Alex Prus |

| April 1, 2010 2 | Houston Dynamo | 2–1 | Real Salt Lake | Houston, Texas |
| 8:00 PM CDT | Davis 52' (pen.), 55' (pen.); Boswell (yellow card) 90+4' | Report | Morales 18'; Wingert (yellow card) 45+1'; Olave (yellow card) 54'; Espindola (yellow card) 90+4' | Stadium: Robertson Stadium; Attendance: 18,197; Referee: Jair Marrufo |

| April 10, 2010 3 | Houston Dynamo | 0–2 | Los Angeles Galaxy | Houston, Texas |
| 7:30 PM CDT | Hainault (yellow card) 24'; Landín (red card) 43'; Davis (yellow card) 66' | Report | Gonzalez (yellow card) 25'; Buddle 27', 45' (yellow card) 52'; Juninho (yellow card) 38' | Stadium: Robertson Stadium; Attendance: 16,459; Referee: Baldomero Toledo |

| April 17, 2010 4 | Houston Dynamo | 3–0 | Chivas USA | Houston, Texas |
| 3:00 PM CDT | Cameron 12'; Palmer 20'; Palmer (yellow card) 56'; Oduro 65' | Report | | Stadium: Robertson Stadium; Attendance: 14,843; Referee: Hilario Grajeda |

| April 24, 2010 5 | Chicago Fire | 2–0 | Houston Dynamo | Bridgeview, Illinois |
| 7:30 PM CDT | Husidic 45+3'; Lowry (yellow card) 55' (goal) 67'; John (yellow card) 81'; Krol (red card) 84'; Banner (yellow card) 88' | Report | Chabala (yellow card) 58'; Serioux (yellow card) 65'; Cruz (yellow card) 79' (yellow-red card) 82'; Landín (yellow card) 84' | Stadium: Toyota Park; Attendance: 11,312; Referee: Ricardo Salazar |

| May 1, 2010 6 | Houston Dynamo | 3–0 | Kansas City Wizards | Houston, Texas |
| 7:30 PM CDT | Landín 24'; Mullan 52'; Palmer (yellow card) 64'; Appiah 88' | Report | Besler (yellow card) 16'; Arnaud (red card) 33'; Auvray (yellow card) 56'; Rocastle (yellow card) 70' | Stadium: Robertson Stadium; Attendance: 16,042; Referee: Terry Vaughn |

| May 5, 2010 7 Texas Derby | Houston Dynamo | 0–1 | FC Dallas | Houston, Texas |
| 8:00 PM CDT | Hainault (yellow card) 50' | Report | Hernández (yellow card) 45'; Benítez (red card) 73'; Ihemelu 79' | Stadium: Robertson Stadium; Attendance: 13,231; Referee: Jorge González |

| May 8, 2010 8 | Chivas USA | 0–2 | Houston Dynamo | Carson, California |
| 9:30 PM CDT | Trujillo (yellow card) 35' | Report | Davis 4'; Serioux 8'; Chabala (yellow card) 42' | Stadium: Home Depot Center; Attendance: 12,577; Referee: Abbey Okulaja |

| May 13, 2010 9 | Real Salt Lake | 3–1 | Houston Dynamo | Sandy, Utah |
| 8:00 PM CDT | Findley 3'; Saborío 24', 60'; Borchers (yellow card) 26' | Report | Chabala (yellow card) 33'; Mullan 72'; Boswell (yellow card) 77' | Stadium: Rio Tinto Stadium; Attendance: 12,945; Referee: Alex Prus |

| May 22, 2010 10 | Houston Dynamo | 2–0 | D.C. United | Houston, Texas |
| 7:00 PM CDT | Cruz 9'; Oduro 55'; Landín (yellow card) 57'; Davis (yellow card) 68' | Report | Montaño (yellow card) 18'; Wallace (yellow card) 65' | Stadium: Robertson Stadium; Attendance: 24,471; Referee: Kevin Stott |

| May 29, 2010 11 | Houston Dynamo | 2–3 | Philadelphia Union | Houston, Texas |
| 7:30 PM CDT | Ching 52'; Robinson 59'; Mullan (yellow card) 79' | Report | Hravey (yellow card) 21'; Salinas 39'; Nakazawa (yellow card) 42'; Arrieta (yellow card) 51'; Miglioranzi (yellow card) 58'; Le Toux 69'; Mwanga 90+3' | Stadium: Robertson Stadium; Attendance: 13,555; Referee: Steven Depiero |

| June 2, 2010 12 | New York Red Bulls | 2–1 | Houston Dynamo | Harrison, New Jersey |
| 6:30 PM CDT | Ubiparipovic 15'; Borman (yellow card) 32'; Albright (yellow card) 40'; Hall (yellow card) 59'; Petke (yellow card) 75'; Angel 90+4' | Report | Mulrooney (yellow card) 13'; Robinson (yellow card) 28'; Mullan (yellow card) 40'; Ching 65'; Palmer (yellow card) 89' | Stadium: Red Bull Arena; Attendance: 11,462; Referee: Hilario Grajeda |

| June 5, 2010 13 | Los Angeles Galaxy | 4–1 | Houston Dynamo | Carson, California |
| 7:00 PM CDT | Kirovski 1', 21'; Bowen 48'; Alequito 56'; Berhalter (yellow card) 60' | Report | Weaver 7' | Stadium: Home Depot Center; Attendance: 20,826; Referee: Paul Ward |

| June 26, 2010 14 | Houston Dynamo | 2–2 | Colorado Rapids | Houston, Texas |
| 7:30 PM CDT | Ching (yellow card) 7'; Cruz 17'; Ngwenya 80' | Report | Casey 45'; Larentowicz (yellow card) 68'; Palmer 71' (o.g.) | Stadium: Robertson Stadium; Attendance: 13,744; Referee: Mark Geiger |

| July 1, 2010 15 | Toronto FC | 1–1 | Houston Dynamo | Toronto, Ontario |
| 6:00 PM CDT | Sanyang (red card) 90+4'; Garcia (yellow card) 59' de Guzman (red card) 62'; Attakora (yellow card) 63'; Gargan 84' (yellow card) 85' | Report | Ngwenya (red card) 62'; Ching 72' | Stadium: BMO Field; Attendance: 21,374; Referee: Jair Marrufo |

| July 10, 2010 16 | Houston Dynamo | 0–0 | Columbus Crew | Houston, Texas |
| 7:30 PM CDT | Hainault (yellow card) 73' | Report | Padula (yellow card) 88' | Stadium: Robertson Stadium; Attendance: 13,486; Referee: Michael Kennedy |

| July 24, 2010 17 | Columbus Crew | 3–0 | Houston Dynamo | Columbus, Ohio |
| 6:30 PM CDT | O'Rourke (yellow card) 22'; Renteria 34'; Iro 84'; Griffit 90' | report | Chabala (yellow card) 2'; Boswell (yellow card) 40' (yellow-red card) 72' | Stadium: Crew Stadium; Attendance: 13,585; Referee: Alex Prus |

| July 31, 2010 18 | Houston Dynamo | 2–2 | New York Red Bulls | Houston, Texas |
| 7:30 PM CDT | Davis 24' (pen.); Palmer (red card) 44'; Mullan 90' | Report | Angel 10', 58'; Lindpere (yellow card) 59'; Richards (yellow card) 71'; Muller (yellow card) 85' | Stadium: Robertson Stadium; Attendance: 24,750; Referee: Paul Ward |

| August 8, 2010 19 | Seattle Sounders FC | 2–0 | Houston Dynamo | Seattle, Washington |
| 10:00 PM CDT | Nyassi (yellow card) 28'; Riley (yellow card) 32'; Nkufo (yellow card) 50'; Montero 64'; Sturgis (yellow card) 70'; Fernández 88' | Report | Chabala (yellow card) 59'; Mullan (yellow card) 59' | Stadium: Qwest Field; Attendance: 36,111; Referee: Michael Kennedy |

| August 14, 2010 20 | New England Revolution | 1–0 | Houston Dynamo | Foxborough, Massachusetts |
| 7:00 PM CDT | Smith (yellow card) 41'; Stolica 62' | Report | Cruz (yellow card) 41'; Obodai (yellow card) 76' | Stadium: Gillette Stadium; Attendance: 11,546; Referee: Jair Marrufo |

| August 21, 2010 21 | Houston Dynamo | 4–3 | Chicago Fire | Houston, Texas |
| 7:30 PM CDT | Ching 31', 59', 85' (yellow card); Palmer 50' | Report | Carr 55'; Conde (yellow card) 61' (goal) 81'; Boswell 70' (o.g.); Ljungberg (yellow card) 90+4' | Stadium: Robertson Stadium; Attendance: 18,890; Referee: Kevin Stott |

| August 28, 2010 22 | Colorado Rapids | 3–0 | Houston Dynamo | Commerce City, Colorado |
| 8:30 PM CDT | Smith 2'; Mastroeni (yellow card) 11'; Cummings 14'; Casey 23' (yellow card) 72' | Report | Palmer (red card) 10'; Cruz (yellow card) 70' | Stadium: Dick's Sporting Goods Park; Attendance: 11,511; Referee: Abiodun Okulaja |

| September 5, 2010 23 | Houston Dynamo | 1–2 | San Jose Earthquakes | Houston, Texas |
| 7:30 PM CDT | Davis 45+2'; Robinson (yellow card) 66' | Report | Stephenson 6'; Hernandez (yellow card) 41'; Glen (yellow card) 45+1'; Geovanni 64'; Cronin (red card) 84' | Stadium: Robertson Stadium; Attendance: 15,073; Referee: Jorge Gonzalez |

| September 18, 2010 24 | Houston Dynamo | 1–2 | Toronto FC | Houston, Texas |
| 7:30 PM CDT | Ching 18'; Cameron (yellow card) 79'; Robinson (yellow card) 90+3' | Report | Barrett (yellow card) 29'; Maicon (yellow card) 53'De Rosario 60', 90+4' (yellow card) 81'; White (yellow card) 89' | Stadium: Robertson Stadium; Attendance: 16,435; Referee: Edvin Jurisevic |

| September 22, 2010 25 | Kansas City Wizards | 4–3 | Houston Dynamo | Kansas City, Kansas |
| 7:30 PM CDT | Kamara 35'; Bunbury 60'; Espinoza (yellow card) 67'; Smith 71'; Wolff 90+6' | Report | Weaver 13'; Oduro 34'; Serioux 37'; Hainault (yellow card) 46'; Palmer (yellow card) 84'; Boswell (yellow card) 89'; Ngwenya (yellow card) 90+5' | Stadium: CommunityAmerica Ballpark; Attendance: 9,679; Referee: Jair Marrufo |

| September 25, 2010 26 | D.C. United | 1–3 | Houston Dynamo | Washington, D.C. |
| 6:30 PM CDT | Najar 29' (yellow card) 69'; Zayner (yellow card) 79'; James (yellow card) 89' | Report | Cochrane (yellow card) 29'; McTavish 66' (o.g.); Cameron 70' (yellow card) 90+4'; Davis (yellow card) 82'; Oduro 90+10' | Stadium: RFK Stadium; Attendance: 13,828; Referee: Alex Prus |

| October 2, 2010 27 | Philadelphia Union | 1–1 | Houston Dynamo | Chester, Pennsylvania |
| 3:00 PM CDT | Harvey (yellow card) 38'; Le Toux 40' | Report | Hainault 12'; Davis (yellow card) 58' | Stadium: PPL Park; Attendance: 16,115; Referee: Kevin Stott |

| October 10, 2010 28 | Houston Dynamo | 1–2 | New England Revolution | Houston, Texas |
| 7:30 PM CDT | Weaver (yellow card) 41'; Cochrane (yellow card) 44'; Serioux (yellow card) 50'; Oduro 59'; Cameron (yellow card) 78' (red card) 90+7'; Ngwenya (red card) 90+3' | Report | Phelan (yellow card) 26'; Gibbs (yellow card) 40'; Joseph 43'; Dube 73'; Barnes (yellow card) 83' | Stadium: Robertson Stadium; Attendance: 16,479; Referee: Mark Geiger |

| October 16, 2010 29 | San Jose Earthquakes | 0–1 | Houston Dynamo | Santa Clara, California |
| 9:00 PM CDT | Cronin (yellow card) 35'; Busch (yellow card) 87' | Report | Hainault 23' | Stadium: Buck Shaw Stadium; Attendance: 10,597; Referee: Michael Kennedy |

| October 23, 2010 30 | Houston Dynamo | 2–1 | Seattle Sounders FC | Houston, Texas |
| 3:00 PM CDT | Cameron 27'; Weaver (yellow card) 33' (goal) 46' | Report | Riley 12'; Parke (yellow card) 29'; Zakuani (yellow card) 35'; González (yellow card) 41' | Stadium: Robertson Stadium; Attendance: 23,990; Referee: Kevin Stott |

=== U.S. Open Cup ===
| June 29, 2010 Third round | Houston Dynamo | 1–0 | Miami FC | Houston, Texas |
| 7:30 PM CDT | Palmer 80' | Report | Patterson-Sewell (yellow card) 48'; Rodrigues (yellow card) 66' (yellow-red card) 83' | Stadium: Robertson Stadium; Attendance: 832; Referee: Chris Penso |

| July 6, 2010 Quarterfinals | Houston Dynamo | 1–3 | Chivas USA | Houston, Texas |
| 7:30 PM CDT | Robinson (yellow card) 54'; Oduro 86'; Waibel (yellow card) 90+3'; Cruz (yellow card) 90+3' | Report | Braun 5', 90'; Lahoud 65'; Padilla (yellow card) 68'; Mayen (yellow card) 90+3' | Stadium: Robertson Stadium; Attendance: 1,097; Referee: Daniel Fitzgerald |

=== SuperLiga ===
| Team | Pld | W | D | L | GF | GA | GD | Pts |
|---|---|---|---|---|---|---|---|---|
| (United States) Houston Dynamo | 3 | 2 | 1 | 0 | 4 | 2 | +2 | 7 |
| (Mexico) Puebla | 3 | 2 | 0 | 1 | 5 | 3 | +2 | 6 |
| (United States) Chivas USA | 3 | 1 | 1 | 1 | 3 | 3 | 0 | 4 |
| (Mexico) Pachuca | 3 | 0 | 0 | 3 | 2 | 6 | −4 | 0 |

| July 15, 2010 Group A | Houston Dynamo (United States) | 2–1 | (Mexico) Pachuca | Houston, Texas |
| 7:00 PM CDT | Cruz (yellow card) 16'; Ngwenya 19', 85' (yellow card) 61' | report | Rodríguez (yellow card) 48'; Manso 51'; Aguilar (yellow card) 84' | Stadium: Robertson Stadium; Attendance: 10,400; Referee: Jerry Solis (Costa Rica) |

| July 18, 2010 Group A | Houston Dynamo (United States) | 1–1 | (United States) Chivas USA | Houston, Texas |
| 7:00 PM CDT | Palmer 6'; Hainault (yellow card) 18'; Robinson (yellow card) 35' | Report | Umaña (yellow card) 41'; Padilla 71' | Stadium: Robertson Stadium; Attendance: 5007; Referee: Jorge Gonzalez USA |

| July 21, 2010 Group A | Houston Dynamo (United States) | 1–0 | (Mexico) Puebla | Houston, Texas |
| 7:00 PM CDT | Palmer (yellow card) 11'; Ngwenya (yellow card) 50'; Oduro 64' (yellow card) 90' (yellow-red card) 90'; Cruz (yellow card) 74' (yellow-red card) 77'; Serioux (yellow card) 86' | Report | García (yellow card) 25'; Brown (yellow card) 52' (red card) 86'; González (red card) 85'; Corona (yellow card) 90+2' | Stadium: Robertson Stadium; Attendance: 10,033; Referee: Oscar Reyna Guatemala |

| August 5, 2010 Semifinal | Houston Dynamo (United States) | 0–1 | (Mexico) Monarcas Morelia | Houston, Texas |
| 7:00 PM CDT | Mullan (yellow card) 57'; Chabala (yellow card) 78'; Ashe (yellow card) 90+6' | report | Sabah 47'; Droguett (yellow card) 61'; Aldrete (yellow card) 66' (yellow-red card) 90+3'; Lozano (yellow card) 78' | Stadium: Robertson Stadium; Attendance: 7,641; Referee: Wálter Quesada (Costa Rica) |

== Player statistics ==
=== Appearances, goals, and assists ===
| No. | Pos. | Nat. | Player | Total | | | MLS | | | U.S. Open Cup | | | SuperLiga | | |
| No. | Pos. | Nat. | Player | Apps | G | A | Apps | G | A | Apps | G | A | Apps | G | A |
|---|---|---|---|---|---|---|---|---|---|---|---|---|---|---|---|
| 1 | GK | (United States) | Tally Hall | 11 | 0 | 0 | 5 | 0 | 0 | 2 | 0 | 0 | 4 | 0 | 0 |
| 2 | DF | (United States) | Eddie Robinson | 28 | 1 | 2 | 23 | 1 | 2 | 2 | 0 | 0 | 3 | 0 | 0 |
| 4 | DF | (United States) | Ryan Cochrane | 17 | 0 | 0 | 12 | 0 | 0 | 2 | 0 | 0 | 3 | 0 | 0 |
| 5 | MF | (United States) | Danny Cruz | 30 | 2 | 2 | 25 | 2 | 2 | 2 | 0 | 0 | 3 | 0 | 0 |
| 7 | FW | (United States) | Colin Clark | 0 | 0 | 0 | 0 | 0 | 0 | 0 | 0 | 0 | 0 | 0 | 0 |
| 7 | FW | (Mexico) | Luis Ángel Landín (Note: Left during the season) | 10 | 1 | 3 | 9 | 1 | 3 | 1 | 0 | 0 | 0 | 0 | 0 |
| 8 | MF | (United States) | Richard Mulrooney | 28 | 0 | 3 | 23 | 0 | 3 | 2 | 0 | 0 | 3 | 0 | 0 |
| 9 | MF | (United States) | Brian Mullan | 25 | 3 | 3 | 22 | 3 | 3 | 0 | 0 | 0 | 3 | 0 | 0 |
| 11 | MF | (United States) | Brad Davis | 30 | 5 | 12 | 27 | 5 | 12 | 0 | 0 | 0 | 3 | 0 | 0 |
| 13 | MF | (United States) | Francisco Navas Cobo | 3 | 0 | 0 | 1 | 0 | 0 | 2 | 0 | 0 | 0 | 0 | 0 |
| 15 | FW | (United States) | Cam Weaver | 19 | 3 | 2 | 14 | 3 | 1 | 2 | 0 | 0 | 3 | 0 | 1 |
| 16 | DF | (United States) | Craig Waibel | 6 | 0 | 0 | 4 | 0 | 0 | 2 | 0 | 0 | 0 | 0 | 0 |
| 17 | MF | (United States) | Mike Chabala | 31 | 1 | 4 | 25 | 1 | 4 | 2 | 0 | 0 | 4 | 0 | 0 |
| 18 | GK | (Canada) | Pat Onstad | 23 | 0 | 0 | 23 | 0 | 0 | 0 | 0 | 0 | 0 | 0 | 0 |
| 20 | MF | (United States) | Geoff Cameron | 17 | 3 | 0 | 16 | 3 | 0 | 0 | 0 | 0 | 1 | 0 | 0 |
| 22 | MF | (Jamaica) | Lovel Palmer | 32 | 4 | 1 | 26 | 2 | 1 | 2 | 1 | 0 | 4 | 1 | 0 |
| 23 | FW | (Ghana) | Dominic Oduro | 32 | 7 | 5 | 27 | 5 | 4 | 2 | 1 | 1 | 3 | 1 | 0 |
| 25 | FW | (United States) | Brian Ching | 23 | 7 | 3 | 20 | 7 | 3 | 0 | 0 | 0 | 3 | 0 | 0 |
| 26 | MF | (United States) | Corey Ashe | 31 | 0 | 4 | 27 | 0 | 3 | 0 | 0 | 0 | 4 | 0 | 0 |
| 27 | MF | (Ghana) | Samuel Appiah | 4 | 1 | 0 | 2 | 1 | 0 | 2 | 0 | 0 | 0 | 0 | 0 |
| 30 | GK | (United States) | Tyler Deric | 2 | 0 | 0 | 2 | 0 | 0 | 0 | 0 | 0 | 0 | 0 | 0 |
| 31 | DF | (Canada) | André Hainault | 32 | 2 | 1 | 28 | 2 | 1 | 0 | 0 | 0 | 4 | 0 | 0 |
| 32 | DF | (United States) | Bobby Boswell | 30 | 0 | 1 | 26 | 0 | 1 | 0 | 0 | 0 | 4 | 0 | 0 |
| 35 | FW | (Zimbabwe) | Joseph Ngwenya | 16 | 3 | 1 | 12 | 1 | 0 | 1 | 0 | 1 | 3 | 2 | 0 |
| 35 | MF | (Ghana) | Anthony Obodai | 6 | 0 | 0 | 4 | 0 | 0 | 0 | 0 | 0 | 2 | 0 | 0 |
| 51 | DF | (Canada) | Adrian Serioux | 18 | 2 | 1 | 13 | 2 | 1 | 2 | 0 | 0 | 3 | 0 | 0 |

Source: Season statistics and match reports in Competitions

=== Disciplinary record ===
| No. | Pos. | Nat. | Player | Total | | MLS | | Open Cup | | SuperLiga | |
| No. | Pos. | Nat. | Player | Booked | Sent off (straight red) | Booked | Sent off (straight red) | Booked | Sent off (straight red) | Booked | Sent off (straight red) |
|---|---|---|---|---|---|---|---|---|---|---|---|
| 2 | DF | (United States) | Eddie Robinson | 5 | 0 | 3 | 0 | 1 | 0 | 1 | 0 |
| 4 | DF | (United States) | Ryan Cochrane | 2 | 0 | 2 | 0 | 0 | 0 | 0 | 0 |
| 5 | MF | (United States) | Danny Cruz | 7 | 1 | 3 | 1 | 1 | 0 | 3 | 0 |
| 7 | FW | (Mexico) | Luis Ángel Landín (Note: Left during the season) | 2 | 1 | 2 | 1 | 0 | 0 | 0 | 0 |
| 8 | MF | (United States) | Richard Mulrooney | 1 | 0 | 1 | 0 | 0 | 0 | 0 | 0 |
| 9 | MF | (United States) | Brian Mullan | 4 | 0 | 3 | 0 | 0 | 0 | 1 | 0 |
| 11 | MF | (United States) | Brad Davis | 4 | 0 | 4 | 0 | 0 | 0 | 0 | 0 |
| 15 | FW | (United States) | Cam Weaver | 2 | 0 | 2 | 0 | 0 | 0 | 0 | 0 |
| 16 | DF | (United States) | Craig Waibel | 1 | 0 | 0 | 0 | 1 | 0 | 0 | 0 |
| 17 | MF | (United States) | Mike Chabala | 6 | 0 | 5 | 0 | 0 | 0 | 1 | 0 |
| 20 | MF | (United States) | Geoff Cameron | 3 | 1 | 3 | 1 | 0 | 0 | 0 | 0 |
| 22 | MF | (Jamaica) | Lovel Palmer | 5 | 2 | 4 | 2 | 0 | 0 | 1 | 0 |
| 23 | FW | (Ghana) | Dominic Oduro | 2 | 0 | 0 | 0 | 0 | 0 | 2 | 0 |
| 25 | FW | (United States) | Brian Ching | 2 | 0 | 2 | 0 | 0 | 0 | 0 | 0 |
| 26 | MF | (United States) | Corey Ashe | 1 | 0 | 0 | 0 | 0 | 0 | 1 | 0 |
| 31 | DF | (Canada) | André Hainault | 5 | 0 | 4 | 0 | 0 | 0 | 1 | 0 |
| 32 | DF | (United States) | Bobby Boswell | 5 | 1 | 5 | 1 | 0 | 0 | 0 | 0 |
| 33 | FW | (Zimbabwe) | Joseph Ngwenya | 3 | 2 | 1 | 2 | 0 | 0 | 2 | 0 |
| 35 | MF | (Ghana) | Anthony Obodai | 1 | 0 | 1 | 0 | 0 | 0 | 0 | 0 |
| 51 | DF | (Canada) | Adrian Serioux | 2 | 0 | 1 | 0 | 0 | 0 | 1 | 0 |

Source: Season statistics and match reports in Competitions

=== Clean sheets ===
| Rank | Nat. | Player | MLS | Open Cup | SuperLiga | Total |
|---|---|---|---|---|---|---|
| 1 | (Canada) | Pat Onstad | 4 | 0 | 0 | 4 |
| 2 | (United States) | Tally Hall | 1 | 1 | 1 | 3 |
| 3 | (United States) | Tyler Deric | 1 | 0 | 0 | 1 |
| Total | | | 6 | 1 | 1 | 8 |

Source: Season statistics and match reports in Competitions

== Honors and awards ==
=== MLS Player of the Week ===
| Week | Player | Ref. |
|---|---|---|
| 21 | (United States) Brian Ching | |

=== MLS Goal of the Week ===
| Week | Player | Opponent | Date |
|---|---|---|---|
| 4 | (Jamaica) Lovel Palmer | Chivas USA | April 17 |
| 27 | (Ghana) Dominic Oduro | D.C. United | May 22 |

=== Annual ===
| Honor | Player | Ref. |
|---|---|---|
| MLS All-Star | (United States) Brad Davis (United States) Brian Ching | |

=== Dynamo team awards ===
| MVP | Defensive Player of the Year | Humanitarian of the Year | Young Player of the Year | Newcomer of the Year | Ref. |
|---|---|---|---|---|---|
| (United States) Brad Davis | (United States) Bobby Boswell | (United States) Brian Ching | (United States) Danny Cruz | (Jamaica) Lovel Palmer | |

== Kits ==
Supplier: Adidas / Sponsor: Amigo Energy

| Home | Away |
