= Samuel Appiah =

Ghanaian footballer

Sammy Appiah
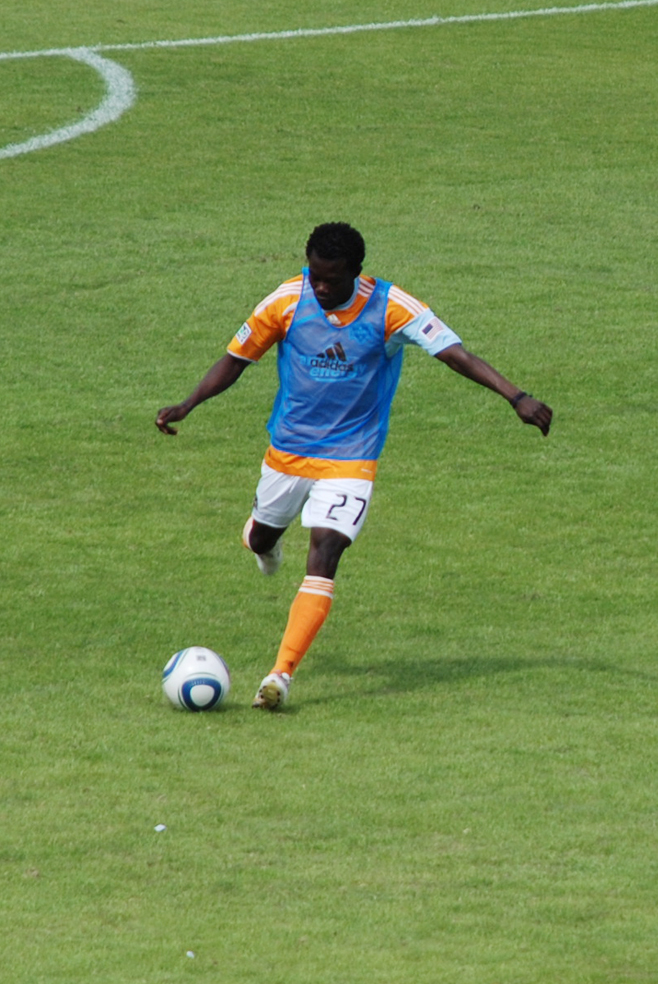

Personal information
- Full name: Samuel Appiah
- Date of birth: March 25, 1985 (age 41)
- Place of birth: Obuasi, Ghana
- Height: 5 ft 8 in (1.73 m)
- Position: Midfielder

Youth career
- 2005–2006: University of Ghana
- 2006–2009: Boston University Terriers

Senior career*
Years	Team	Apps	(Gls)
2010	Houston Dynamo	2	(1)
2011	Pittsburgh Riverhounds	22	(0)
2013	Boston Olympiakos		
- * Club domestic league appearances and goals as of September 1, 2011

Samuel Appiah (born March 25, 1985, in Obuasi) is a Ghanaian footballer.

== Career ==
=== College ===
Appiah attended the Ashgold Academy and Adisadel College (the equivalent of high school in Ghana), and spent four years with the Ajax Football Academy in Kumasi, Ghana between the ages of 13 and 17, before attending and playing soccer at the University of Ghana from 2005 to 2006. He relocated to the United States in 2006 when he was offered a scholarship by Boston University, and subsequently played four years of college soccer for the Terriers.

He appeared in every game of his four-year career, and received several regional and conference honors, being named to America East all-rookie team in 2006, earning second-team all-America East honors as a junior in 2008, and being named to the all-America East first team as a senior in 2009. He was also honored with the athletic department's Simpson Award for enthusiasm and leadership throughout his career.

=== Professional ===
Appiah was selected in the third round (46th overall) of the 2010 MLS SuperDraft by Houston Dynamo. He made his professional debut on May 1, 2010, in a game against the Kansas City Wizards, and scored his first professional goal in the 88th minute of that game.

After being released by Houston during the 2011 pre-season, Appiah signed with the Pittsburgh Riverhounds of the USL Professional Division.
