= Houston Dynamo FC =

American professional soccer club based in Houston

Houston Dynamo
- Nicknames: Orange Crush; La Naranja (The Orange)
- Founded: December 15, 2005; 20 years ago
- Stadium: Shell Energy Stadium; Houston, Texas
- Capacity: 20,656
- Majority owner: Ted Segal
- General manager: Pat Onstad
- Head coach: Ben Olsen
- League: Major League Soccer
- 2026: Western Conference: 5th Overall: 10th Playoffs: TBD
- Website: houstondynamofc.com
Home colors	Away colors	Third colors

Houston Dynamo Football Club is an American professional soccer club based in Houston. The club competes in Major League Soccer (MLS) as a member of the Western Conference. Established on December 15, 2005, the club was founded after their former owners relocated the San Jose Earthquakes' players and staff to Houston following the 2005 season. For their first six seasons in Houston, the Dynamo played at Robertson Stadium on the campus of the University of Houston. During the 2012 season, the club moved to Shell Energy Stadium, a soccer-specific stadium in East Downtown Houston.

The club is majority-owned by Ted Segal.

The Houston Dynamo have won the MLS Cup twice, doing so during their first two seasons in 2006 and 2007. The club has also won the U.S. Open Cup twice, in 2018 and 2023. They have been MLS Cup runners-up twice, in 2011 and 2012, and Supporters' Shield runners-up once in 2008. The Dynamo have also reached the final of the now defunct North American SuperLiga, finishing as runners-up following a defeat against the New England Revolution.

== History ==
MLS commissioner Don Garber revealed on November 16, 2005, that the league had granted permission to San Jose Earthquakes' owners Anschutz Entertainment Group to relocate the team for the 2006 season, giving the entertainment giant 30 days to make a decision. Garber was in Houston and spoke with the media before an international friendly between Mexico and Bulgaria at Reliant Stadium, citing Houston as a next destination for an MLS club whether the Earthquakes moved or not.

"This is the market they've got their sights set on. This is a market that we've got investor interest, we've got sponsor interest, we've got media interest. This is a market that's going to be terrific for us. We will have a team in Houston in due time. The question is whether we have one as early as 2006 as part of a move, or as an expansion team. We'll get a team here, there's no doubt in our mind."

— MLS commissioner Don Garber, in an interview with the Associated Press, printed November 16, 2005

On December 15, 2005, Major League Soccer announced all players and coaches under contract to the Earthquakes would move to Houston. The Earthquakes name, colors and competition records were retained by the league for a possible expansion team. The San Jose team would take the field in 2008. As a result, the Earthquakes are regarded as having suspended operations in 2006 and 2007, while the Dynamo are recognized as a 2006 expansion team.

This is not an expansion franchise. This is one of the best teams in the MLS. You are getting an extraordinary franchise.

— AEG President and CEO Timothy J. Leiweke, at Houston City Hall, December 16, 2005

A ceremony was held outside Houston City Hall on December 16, 2005, to officially announce the franchise's arrival. Mayor Bill White joined city council members, Harris County officials, local soccer organizers and fans in welcoming team coach Dominic Kinnear and players Pat Onstad and Wade Barrett with cowboy boots and hats. It was disclosed that the team would train and play at the University of Houston's Robertson Stadium on a three-year lease with the university earning a percentage of the revenues from concessions, parking and other sources.

In an immediate effort to plant roots in the community, AEG president and CEO Tim Leiweke announced former Houston Oilers quarterback Oliver Luck as the team's president and general manager. A previous NFL Europe executive, Luck had served as the head of the Harris County-Houston Sports Authority since 2001 and was instrumental in pursuing an MLS team for the city while also overseeing the construction of Daikin Park (home of the Astros), Reliant Stadium (home to the Texans) and the Toyota Center (home to the Rockets) during his tenure.

=== Early years (2006–2010) ===
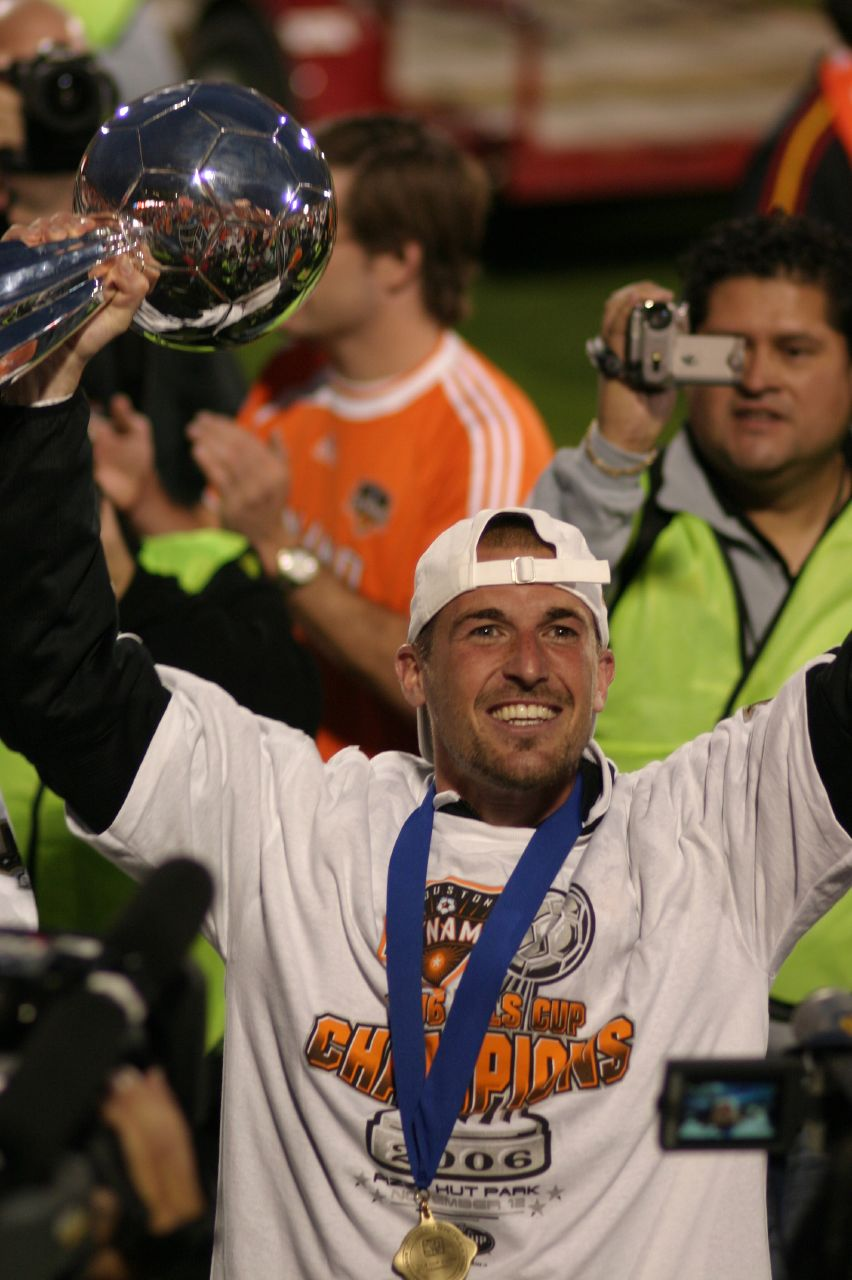
Paul Dalglish holds the trophy after the 2006 MLS Cup victory

MLS Cup 2006 starting lineup.

The newly relocated Houston team was named Houston 1836, paying homage to the city's founding date and the logo featured a silhouette of the Statue of Sam Houston, in Hermann Park. Immediate backlash to the 1836 was voiced by the Mexican community claiming that date, the year of the Texas Revolution was not a date that should be celebrated. Ownership decided to change the name to the Houston Dynamo stripping the franchise of the Sam Houston logo.

The Dynamo played their first regular season game on April 2, 2006, at Robertson Stadium in front of a crowd of 25,462. The Dynamo beat Colorado Rapids 5–2, with Brian Ching scoring four goals, with all four assisted by Dwayne De Rosario. The Dynamo finished their first season with an 11–8–13 record, earning them second place in the Western Conference. In the playoffs, they eliminated both Chivas USA and the Rapids 3–1, in the Western Conference to advance to the MLS Cup.

The championship match was scoreless until the second half of extra time, when New England's Taylor Twellman scored. One minute later, Brian Ching headed in the tying goal for Houston. The cup final became the first time in MLS history, that was decided by a penalty shootout. Houston beat the New England Revolution 4–3 on penalty kicks to win the 2006 MLS Cup. Kelly Gray and Stuart Holden scored Houston's first two penalty kicks. Dwayne De Rosario and Brian Ching scored the last two. By winning the 2006 MLS Cup, Houston qualified for the 2007 CONCACAF Champions Cup for the first time in club history.

==== Back to back champions ====
Houston began the 2007 season by competing in the 2007 CONCACAF Champions' Cup. After winning a quarterfinal against Costa Rican team Puntarenas F.C., Houston exited the competition in the semifinals, beating Mexican team Pachuca 2–0 in the first leg but losing 5–2 after extra time in the return leg.

MLS Cup 2007 starting lineup.

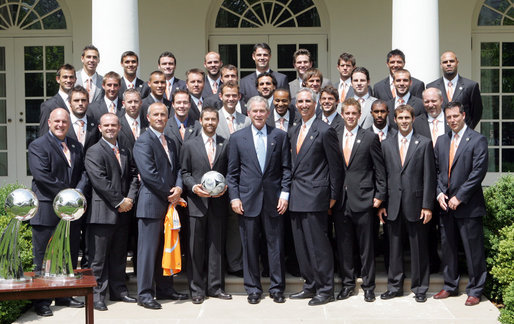
President George W. Bush and the 2007 Dynamo squad after the second MLS Cup victory

Houston began its 2007 MLS league campaign with shutouts against Los Angeles Galaxy and Chivas USA. The team would continue to struggle in the regular season. During the season, Houston made some significant trades. They traded Kevin Goldthwaite and a first-round pick in the 2008 SuperDraft to Toronto FC for Richard Mulrooney. The team also traded Alejandro Moreno to Columbus Crew in exchange for Joseph Ngwenya. And they traded Kelly Gray to Los Angeles Galaxy for Nate Jaqua. After beating FC Dallas, Houston began an unbeaten streak of eleven games and a shutout streak of 726 minutes, an MLS record.

Following their comebck, Houston finished as the second seed in the regular season clinching a berth to the 2007 MLS Cup Playoffs. Their first opponent in the postseason were in-state rivals FC Dallas. Dallas won the first leg 1–0, but Houston won the second leg at Robertson Stadium, 4–1 in extra time, to win 4–2 on aggregate. Houston faced the Kansas City Wizards in the Western Conference final, winning 2–0 to advance to the MLS Cup championship game for a consecutive season. Just like in 2006, Houston faced the New England Revolution for the championship. Houston won 2–1 on a game-winning goal by Dwayne De Rosario in the second half, thus winning a consecutive MLS Cup.

==== Partnership with Golden Boy promotions ====
Late in 2007, Major League Soccer informed Dynamo owners Anschutz Entertainment Group that they should divest their interest in the Dynamo, as they wanted each ownership group to own only one team. AEG also owned the Los Angeles Galaxy. On November 21, 2007, it was announced that AEG was in negotiations to sell the Dynamo to a partnership of Brener International Group and Golden Boy Promotions, owned by the famed boxer Oscar De La Hoya.

On February 26, 2008, Houston Dynamo President Oliver Luck revealed the planned negotiations to the media stating that the Houston Dynamo would be managed in majority by original owners Anschutz Entertainment Group (who held 50% of ownership) along with newfound partners Gabriel Brener, head of Brener International Group, and multiple World and Olympic boxing champion Oscar De La Hoya (each with 25% ownership). De La Hoya had been seen wearing Dynamo colors on his boxing uniform with a small Houston Dynamo logo on his right leg in a fight against boxer Steve Forbes. He had also pledged to help find Dynamo a soccer-specific stadium.

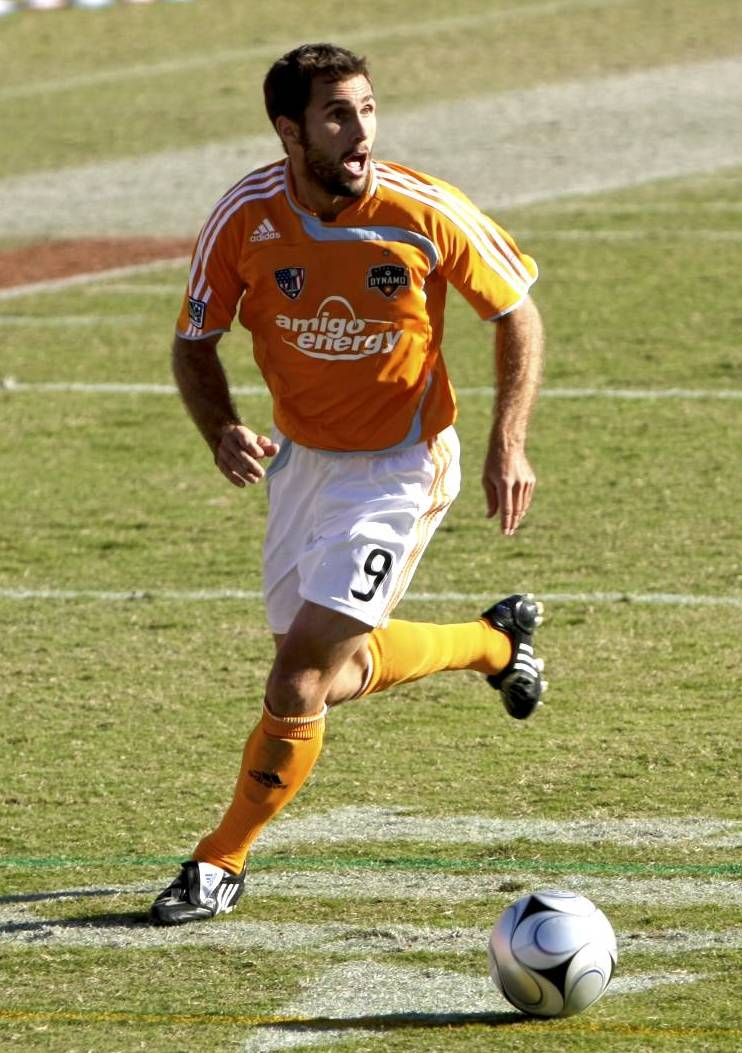
Brian Mullan vs. the New York Red Bulls during the 2008 Western Conference Semifinals at Robertson Stadium.

The Dynamo participated in the inaugural Pan-Pacific Championship on February 20, 2008, in Honolulu, Hawaii. Houston qualified to participate in the tournament via their in MLS Cup. The Houston Dynamo won their first match against Sydney FC, before finishing in second place after their 6–1 loss to Gamba Osaka in the final match. The Dynamo were back on the pitch competing in the CONCACAF Champions' Cup (qualifying as the 2007 MLS Cup Champions). The Dynamo played Municipal in the Quarterfinals winning 3–1 on aggregate (0–0, 3–1) at Robertson Stadium. The club lost to Deportivo Saprissa on 3–0 aggregate (0–0, 0–3) at Estadio Ricardo Saprissa.

Houston began their regular season home opener in a 3–3 draw against Texas Derby rival, FC Dallas. Houston fell behind twice before a game-tying goal in the 93rd minute. The Dynamo went 0–2–4, before getting their first league win of the season in a 2–1 win over the Colorado Rapids. The Dynamo went on a 5–0–4 run to finish the season 13–5–12, claiming 1st in the Western Conference and 2nd overall (behind the Columbus Crew). The Western Conference Semifinals was played against the New York Red Bulls with the first leg finishing in a 1–1 draw at Giants Stadium, and the second leg moved to Robertson Stadium where the Red Bulls defeated the Dynamo 0–3 in front of more than 30,000 fans.

The Dynamo started the new year with a quick exit from the 2008–09 CONCACAF Champions League with a 1–4 aggregate loss (1–1, 0–3) to Atlante in the quarterfinals.

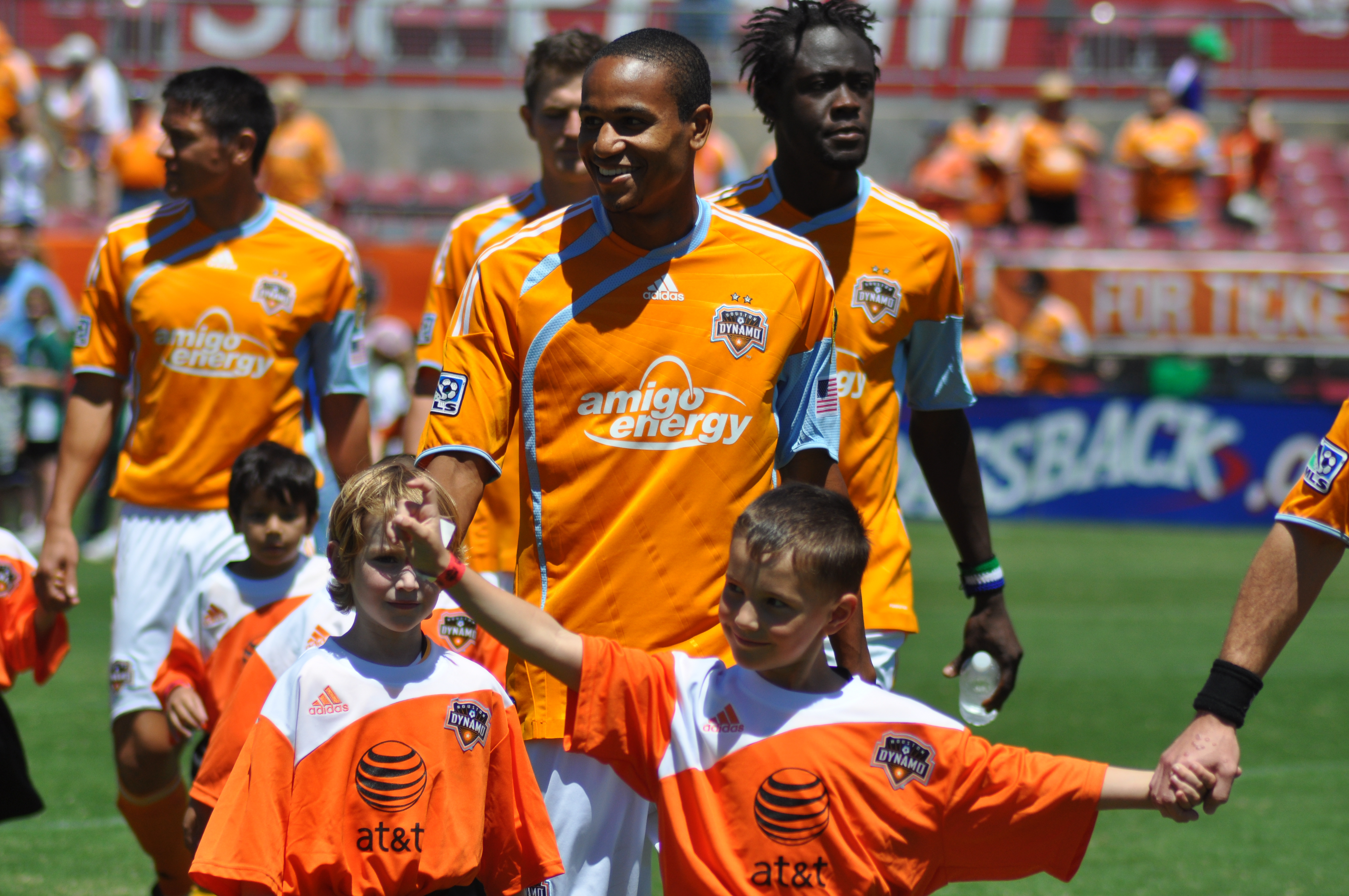
Houston players walk onto the pitch with kids prior to an April 2009 match with Colorado

In the regular season, Houston went on an 11-game unbeaten streak (8–0–3) early in the season before losing to the Los Angeles Galaxy in June. The Dynamo were inconsistent the rest of the season while dealing with international competition, but still finished the season tied for first in the Western Conference with a 13–8–9 record, finishing second in the Western Conference. In the playoffs, Houston beat Seattle 1–0 on aggregate in extra time. The Dynamo then lost 0–2 in extra time to the Galaxy in the Western Conference final. The Dynamo reached the semifinals of the 2009 U.S. Open Cup before losing to the expansion Seattle Sounders FC 1–2 in extra time, after former Dynamo player Nate Jaqua scored the game-tying goal in the 89th minute.

During the 2009–10 offseason, the Dynamo saw the departures of two key players, Ricardo Clark to Eintracht Frankfurt and Stuart Holden to Bolton Wanderers.

The 2010 season kicked off with a 1–1 draw against FC Dallas at Pizza Hut Park. The home opener against Real Salt Lake saw Brian Ching injure a hamstring strain, which kept him out for 4–6 weeks. Later in the season, Geoff Cameron was off the roster, after rupturing his PCL during a game against the Chicago Fire; losing 2–0. Cameron eventually returned in August. The Dynamo finished the season 9–15–6 (7th West, 12th overall), and missed the playoffs for the first time since the 2006 season.

During the 2010 Lamar Hunt U.S. Open Cup. The club defeated Miami FC, 1–0, on June 29 before losing to Chivas USA, 1–3 in the Quarterfinals on July 6 (both games at Robertson Stadium). The Dynamo also competed in the 2010 North American SuperLiga, winning the group before exiting after a 0–1 loss to Morelia on August 5 at Robertson Stadium.

=== Competing in the Eastern Conference (2011–2014) ===
The Dynamo switched to the Eastern Conference for the 2011 season, after teams in Vancouver and Portland were added. The team ended the regular season in second place in the Eastern Conference with a record of 12-9-13 (WLD) and 49 points. This record was fueled by MVP candidate Brad Davis's league-leading 16 assists.

In the Eastern Conference semi-finals, the Dynamo were matched up in a series against the Philadelphia Union, which the Dynamo won 3–1 in the home and home series. For the Eastern Conference Final, the Dynamo traveled to Kansas City. Brad Davis was injured in the first half, however, the Dynamo scored twice to earn their ticket to the MLS Final and a chance to face the Los Angeles Galaxy. Los Angeles's Home Depot Center had been selected to host the 2011 MLS Final. The Dynamo were not able to power through, surrendering a goal to Landon Donovan in the 72nd minute.

After completion of their new stadium, the Dynamo made a victorious home debut on May 12, 2012, vs. D.C. United thanks to a Brad Davis strike in front of a capacity crowd of 22,039 that would mark the beginning of what would be an unbeaten year for the Dynamo at home, posting a year-end home record of 11–0–6. In the playoffs, the Dynamo traveled to Chicago to face the Chicago Fire. Buoyed by two goals by Will Bruin, the Dynamo held on to a 2–1 victory in Chicago. The Dynamo then faced the top seed in the Eastern Conference, Sporting Kansas City in the Eastern Conference Semi-finals, played over two legs. Behind goals from Adam Moffat and Will Bruin. In front of a crowd of 20,894, Kansas City defeated the Dynamo 1–0, but the Dynamo survived 2–1 on aggregate.

==== Cup Final rematch ====
The Dynamo advanced to face D.C. United in the Eastern Conference Finals, with the first leg being played in Houston. The Dynamo won the first leg 3–1, behind goals from Andre Hainault, Will Bruin, and Kofi Sarkodie in front of 22,101. In the second leg, a 33rd-minute goal from Oscar Boniek García gave the Dynamo a 1–1 draw, and the Dynamo won 4–2 on aggregate and advanced to their second straight MLS Cup, in a rematch to face the Los Angeles Galaxy.

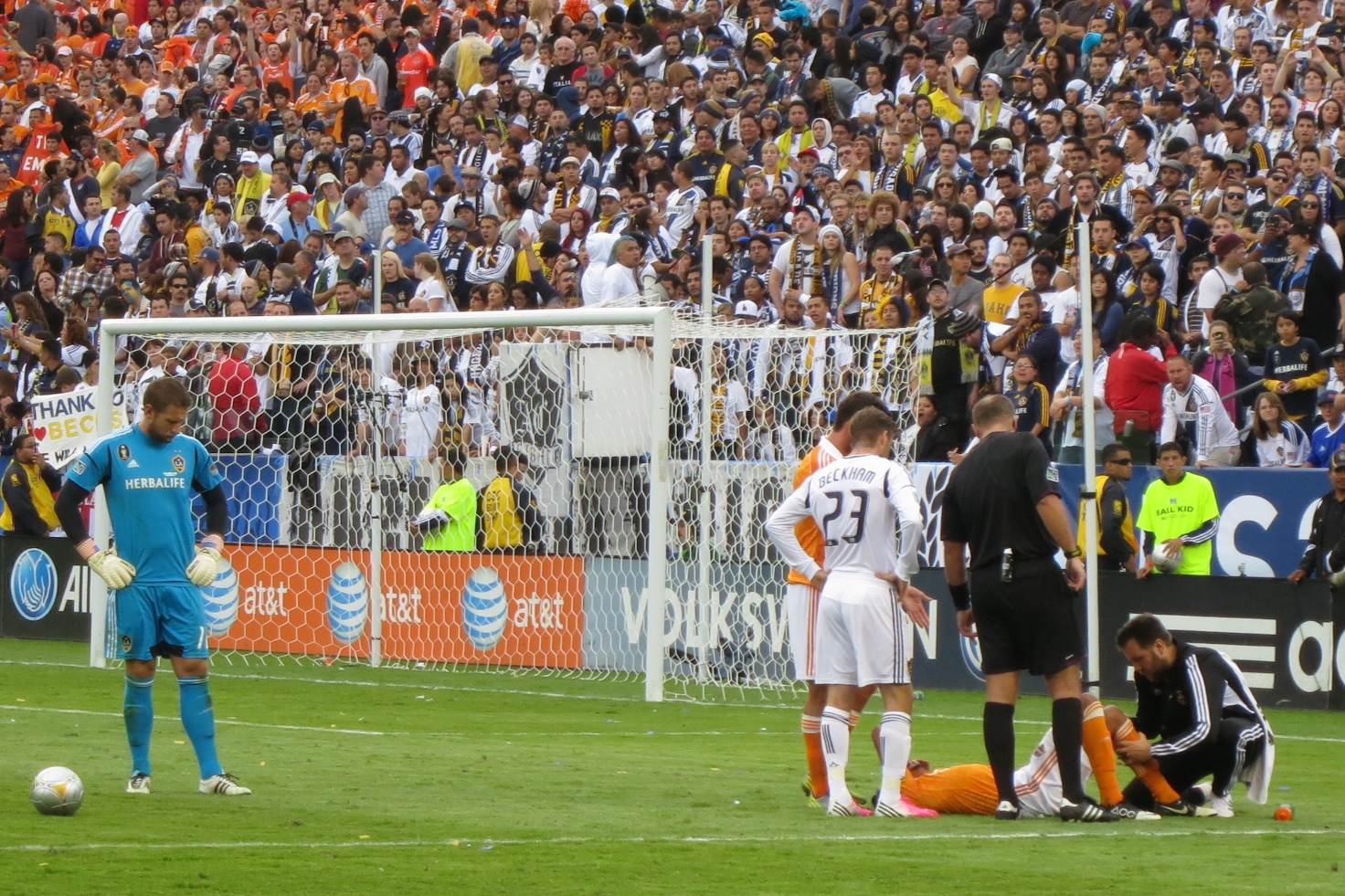
Calen Carr lies injured as David Beckham looks on during the 2012 MLS Cup

MLS Cup 2012 was hosted by L.A. with a sellout crowd of 30,510. After getting a goal from Calen Carr in the 44th minute. One minute after Calen Carr went down with an injury, the Galaxy equalized through Omar Gonzalez's header. Five minutes later, Landon Donovan sealed the win with a penalty after Ricardo Clark handled the ball in the area. Robbie Keane added a third goal for LA, who would win their fourth MLS Cup.

During the 2012 season, the Dynamo were undefeated at home, part of what would eventually become a 36-match unbeaten streak in all competitions. Will Bruin emerged as leading goal-scorer in his second season with the team. The Dynamo topped their group in the 2012–13 CONCACAF Champions League, where they moved on to face Santos Laguna in the round of 16 of the competition to be played March 5, 2013. By finishing as runners-up in MLS Cup, they were awarded a berth in the 2013–14 CONCACAF Champions League as well.

The 2013 Dynamo season saw the men in orange continue their home dominance with a 9–4–4 record. Their 36 consecutive game home-win streak ended by Sporting Kansas City on May 12, 2013, in a 0–1 loss, after Aurelien Collin scored the winner. The Dynamo clinched a playoff berth as a 4-seed with a 14–11–9 overall record. Houston faced Montreal in a heated contest for the MLS Wildcard Match to open the postseason at BBVA Stadium. Will Bruin continued his torrid postseason run of goals with a brace in a 3–0 rout against Montreal.

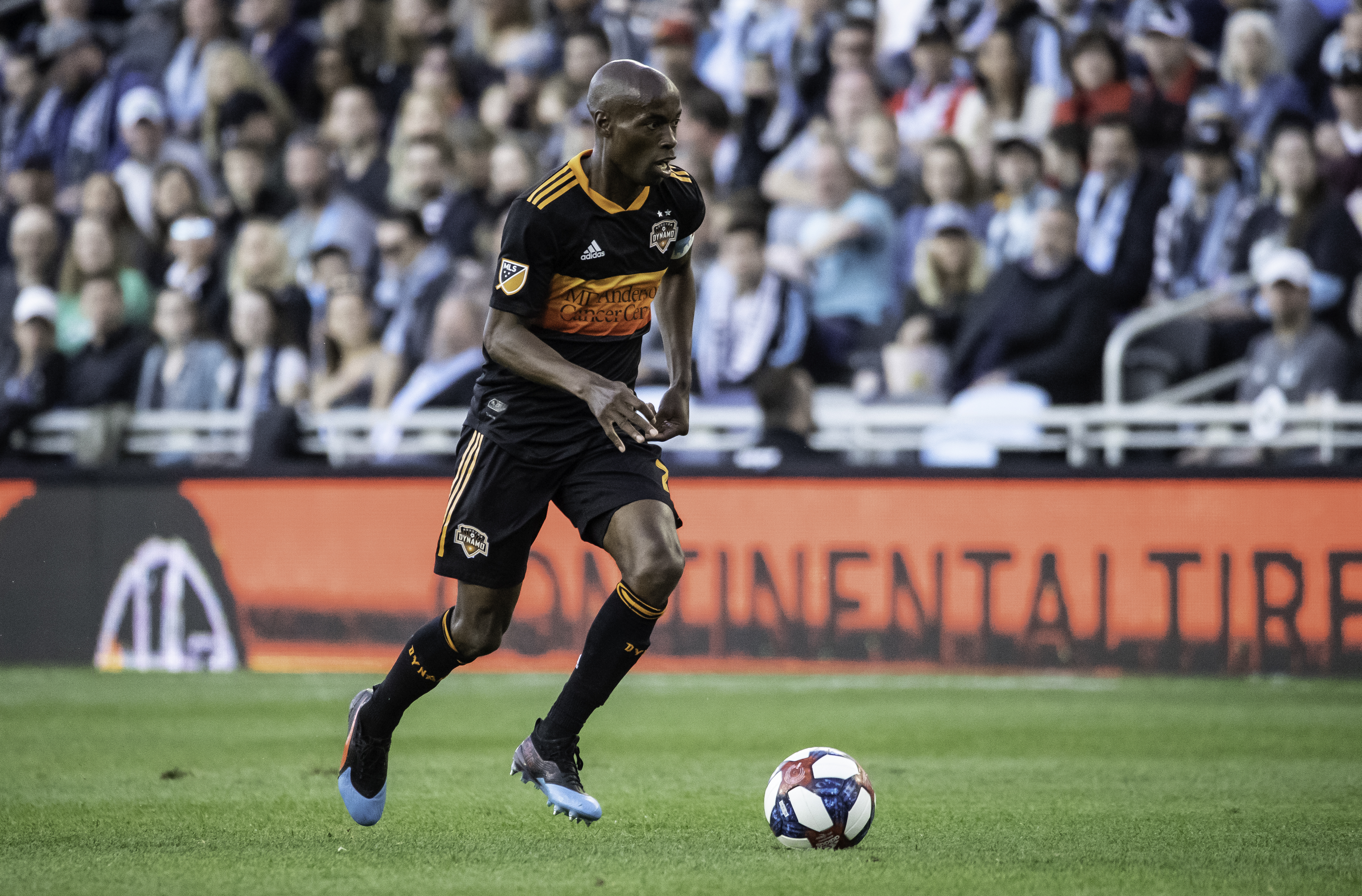
USMNT midfielder DaMarcus Beasley played for Houston from 2014 to 2019

The Dynamo then faced New York Red Bulls who had beat them during the regular season in all three meetings, and it appeared they would thrash the Dynamo in the playoffs after the Red Bulls jumped out to a 2–0 lead during the first leg in Houston. Ricardo Clark was able to get on the board at the 50', and Omar Cummings, scored in stoppage time to complete Houston's exciting comeback. The 2nd leg in New York proved to be just as exciting. Bradley Wright-Phillips put the Red Bulls in the series lead again in the 23', but Brad Davis capitalized on a mistake from the Red Bull defense to level the score before the half. Omar Cummings for the second time scored a thrilling stoppage-time goal to put the Houston Dynamo into the Conference Championship for the third consecutive year.

Unfortunately for the Dynamo, that would be as far as they would go. After a draw at home against Sporting Kansas City, the eventual champions, the Dynamo would fall 2–1 to Sporting on the return leg in Kansas. However, 2013 would be considered a successful year for the Dynamo. The team had core players all signed to long-term contracts.

On July 1, 2014, Houston Dynamo announced a multi-year jersey sponsorship with BHP Billiton. Dominic Kinnear was the head coach. Brad Davis was the team captain. On July 23, 2014, the Dynamo signed DeMarcus Beasley from Puebla. The team finished 8th in the Eastern Conference and did not make the playoffs for only the second time in club history.

=== 2015–present ===
The Dynamo returned to the Western Conference before the start of the 2015 season. Owen Coyle was named the new head coach, and Brad Davis continued as captain. Houston finished eighth in the Western Conference, and finished fifteenth in the twenty-team league and failed to make the playoffs. At the end of the 2015 season, the team announced Brener had bought out AEG's remaining stake and was now the majority owner.

On May 25, 2016, the Houston Dynamo announced they were parting ways with head coach Owen Coyle, by mutual agreement. On June 7, Wade Barrett took over as the interim head coach. The Dynamo went on to finish last in the West on thirty-four points with an average attendance of approximately 20,000. Wilmer Cabrera was named the new head coach on October 28, 2016, replacing Wade Barrett, who was not selected as the head coach.

2018 U.S. Open Cup final starting lineup

The team finished fourth in the West during the 2017 season, earning their first playoff berth since 2013. They made run in the post season, but lost to Seattle Sounders FC in the MLS Western Conference Finals.

The 2018 season marked the first U.S. Open Cup title in franchise history when the team beat the Philadelphia Union 3–0 in the final. The Dynamo qualified for the 2019 CONCACAF Champions League, their first appearance in the competition since 2013. However the team failed to qualify for the MLS playoffs, prompting calls for new ownership as Brener and De La Hoya remained quiet about the team's woes.

The Dynamo started the 2019 season by competing in the CONCACAF Champions League and defeating C.D. Guastatoya in both legs of the first round. They then lost to Tigres UANL by an aggregate score of 3–0 in the quarterfinals. Houston participated in the inaugural Leagues Cup but were eliminated via penalties in the first round by Club America. After going through a 2–11–1 stretch during the summer, the Dynamo fired head coach Wilmer Cabrera. They missed the MLS playoffs for the second consecutive year.

The Dynamo hired former U.S. men's national team player Tab Ramos as head coach in 2020, traded for former Minnesota United FC attacker Darwin Quintero and signed Croatian goalkeeper Marko Maric. However, they would miss the playoffs for the sixth time in seven years, finishing at the bottom of the Western Conference during the COVID-19 shortened season. After the 2021 season the Houston Dynamo chose not to extend Tab Ramos's expiring contact after finishing bottom of the Western Conference for a consecutive season.

Ted Segal completed the acquisition of the Houston Dynamo and Houston Dash on June 22, 2021. The deal was reportedly worth $400 million. Since acquiring the team, Segal has invested significantly into the club, both the Dynamo and Dash and Shell Energy Stadium.

One of Segal's first changes as the new majority owner of the Dynamo was to bring in Dynamo legend Pat Onstad as the General Manager. Onstad returned to Houston after serving as an assistant coach, chief scout and technical director for three MLS teams since 2011. Before returning to Houston, Onstad was the technical director and vice president of soccer operations for the Columbus Crew where he helped build the roster that won the 2020 MLS Cup and the 2021 Campeones Cup.

Segal's commitment to returning the Dynamo to promince was most evident on March 2, 2022, when Houston Dynamo FC made their biggest signing in club history when Héctor Herrera joined on a pre-contract agreement through the 2024 MLS season as a designated player.

Paulo Nagamura was appointed as the head coach ahead of the 2022 season on January 3, 2022, and was dismissed eight months later after an 8-16-5 record placed the team last in the Western Conference. Dynamo 2 manager Kenny Bundy was named the interim head coach for the remainder of the season.

Ben Olsen was hired as the manager for the 2023 season. The former MLS and USMNT midfielder led the team to a 14-11-9 record in league play and the club's first MLS Cup Playoffs appearance in five seasons leading the Dynamo to the Western Conference Final against LAFC. The team won the 2023 U.S. Open Cup and advanced to the knockout phase of the Leagues Cup.

The Dynamo announced the addition of U.S. Men's National Team legend Tim Howard to its ownership group on July 16, 2024. Howard said joining the HDFC ownership grants him the opportunity to "further contribute to the growth of the game in the United States and connect with the passionate soccer fans who call Houston home."

2023 U.S. Open Cup final starting lineup

== Colors and badge ==
The official colors of the Dynamo crest are Wildcatter orange, Space City blue, and Raven black. The star on the original crest is an ad hoc adoption, likely a nod to the Houston, Texas Flag or the "Houston 1836" crest concept. It also retains the soccer ball with the star in the middle from the "1836" logo, though the shadow is changed to Space City blue.

With the 2006 MLS Cup win, a sanctioned star was added above the shield in 2008, after wearing the scudetto in 2007. Since they won the MLS Cup again in 2007. they wore the scudetto for the second consecutive year in 2008. Consequently, a sanctioned star was added to the crest in 2009 for their win at MLS Cup 2007.

In 2020, the club rebranded as Houston Dynamo FC with a new logo. The new logo features a hexagonal shape to whose six sides represent the Dynamo's founding in 2006 and to reference the six wards that made up the original layout of the city. The crest also references Houston's bayou system with the channels within the interlocking monogram to represent Bayou City's waterways.

=== Name ===
Houston announced the name "Dynamo", on March 6, 2006, which refers to Houston's energy-based industrial economy, as well as a previous Houston soccer team, the Houston Dynamos who played in the Lone Star Soccer Alliance and United Soccer League. The official reason for the name is that then-team president Oliver Luck said, "Dynamo is a word to describe someone who never fatigues, never gives up. The name is symbolic of Houston as an energetic, hard-working, risk-taking kind of town." The team colors are orange, white, and "Space City" blue or "Luv Ya Blue" (light blue), meant as a symbol of the city of Houston flag which is light blue and of yet another team in Houston's sports history – the NFL's Houston Oilers.

Originally, on January 25, 2006, the team had announced that Houston 1836 would be the team name. This followed an online survey for the fans to provide suggestions for the name. According to MLS & AEG, who chose the name, the 1836 name referred to the year that the city of Houston was founded by brothers Augustus Chapman Allen and John Kirby Allen. The name had perceived ambiguity, however, as it is also the year of Texan independence from Mexico. Houston 1836's logo featured a silhouette of General Sam Houston, one of Houston's and Texas' most famous historical figures. The choice of Houston 1836 soon became a political issue. It raised a furor among some locals of Hispanic descent, a major target audience, who related 1836 with the war for Texas independence. Owing to protests from Hispanic fans, the name was changed to the Dynamo. MLS has since not allowed any online surveys to name expansion teams.

In 2020, the club officially added "Football Club" to its name, commonly abbreviated as Houston Dynamo FC.

== Stadiums ==
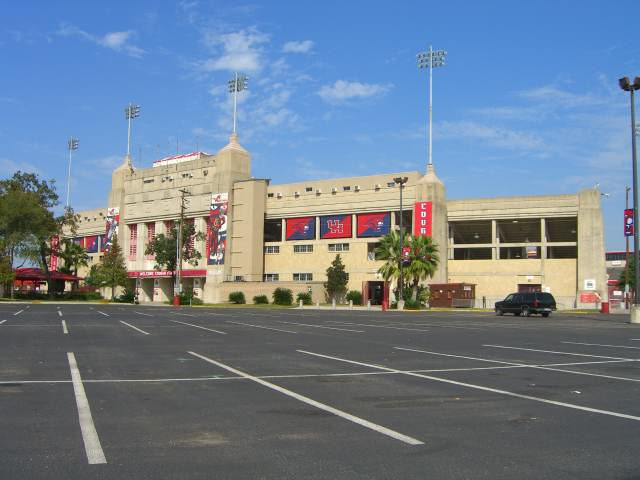
Robertson Stadium was the former home of the Houston Dynamo.

Stadium	Capacity	Location	Year(s)	Notes
Robertson Stadium	32,000	Houston, Texas	2006–2011	
Reliant Stadium	71,795	Houston, Texas	2006	Hosted one game in MLS regular season (first match of a doubleheader featuring FC Barcelona vs. Club América) and the 2010 MLS All-Star Game
Carl Lewis Track & Field Stadium	6,000	Houston, Texas	2006	Hosted one game in U.S. Open Cup
Aggie Soccer Stadium	3,500	College Station, Texas	2007, 2011	Hosted one game in CONCACAF Champions' League, one game in US Open Cup
Shell Energy Stadium	20,656	Houston, Texas	2012–present	

=== Shell Energy Stadium ===
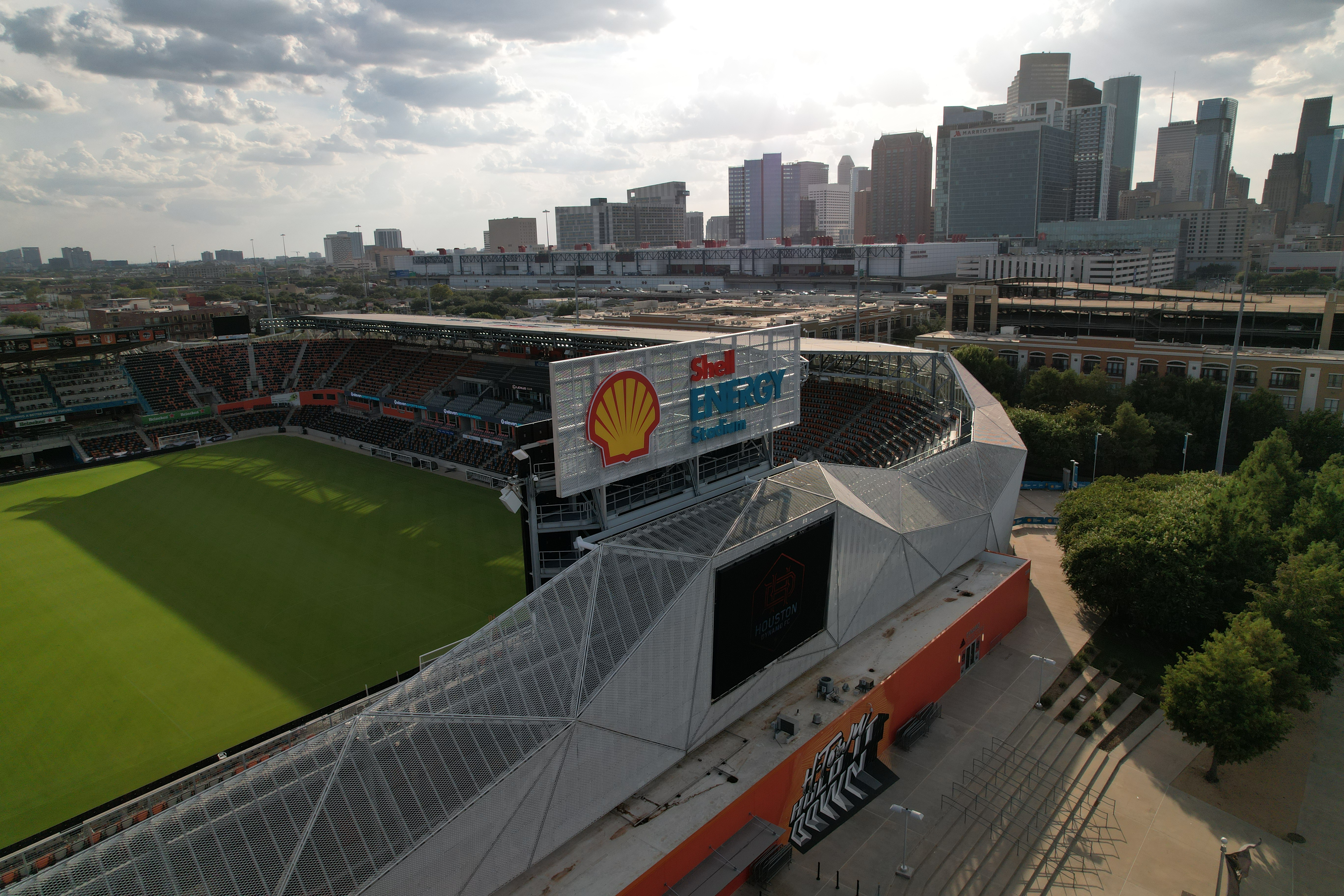
Shell Energy Stadium is the current home of the Houston Dynamo.

On December 2, 2010, Harris County and the Houston Sports Authority reached an agreement for the 20,000–22,000-seat soccer-specific stadium in Downtown Houston east of Daikin Park, across Highway 59 which would be the third sporting facility for Downtown Houston. The venue, then under the name of 'BBVA Compass Stadium' for sponsorship reasons, opened on May 12, 2012, with a game against D.C. United.

On February 5, 2011, Houston Dynamo players, accompanied by Dynamo owner Philip Anschutz and Equity Partners Oscar De La Hoya and Gabriel Brener, Houston Mayor Annise Parker, Harris County Judge Ed Emmitt, Houston Dynamo President Chris Canetti, amongst others, participated in the groundbreaking of the Dynamo's new stadium in front of a few thousand fans. Construction began later that month.

Spectators can experience unobstructed views from both the lower and upper seating bowls, which are supported by a single concourse. The concourse provides full access around the stadium with easy access to concession and toilet. On June 22, 2022, Houston Dynamo Football Club (HDFC) announced plans for major upgrades to Shell Energy Stadium. The renovation project began immediately following the conclusion of the 2022 MLS and NWSL seasons and was ready in time for the 2023 season. The project was headlined by the installation of all-new mesh seats throughout the entire seating bowl and made Shell Energy Stadium the first soccer-specific stadium in America with mesh seating throughout the building. A portion of the east side of the stadium was reconfigured to create a club area. The East Club, includes the three centermost sections of the east sideline lower level and hold a capacity of 824 guests.

The East Club features nine loge boxes. Each loge box seats eight guests.

Aside from Major League Soccer and international soccer matches, the stadium also hosts Texas Southern University football, concerts, and much more. With its downtown location, the stadium is now a part of a true Stadium District, which features Daikin Park and Toyota Center, as well as other amenities and attractions such as the George R. Brown Convention Center, the Hilton Americas, Discovery Green, and Houston Pavilions.

On June 13, 2019, it was announced that BBVA Compass Stadium was changing its name to BBVA Stadium following the sponsor's rebrand.

During the second half of the 2021 season, BBVA Stadium was rebranded as PNC Stadium following PNC Financial Services' acquisition of BBVA USA in June 2021.

On January 17, 2023, PNC Stadium became Shell Energy Stadium following Shell Energy and the Dynamo agreeing on a stadium naming rights deal reportedly worth $40 million over 8 years. Shell Energy Stadium has a capacity of 20,656.

=== Houston Sports Park ===
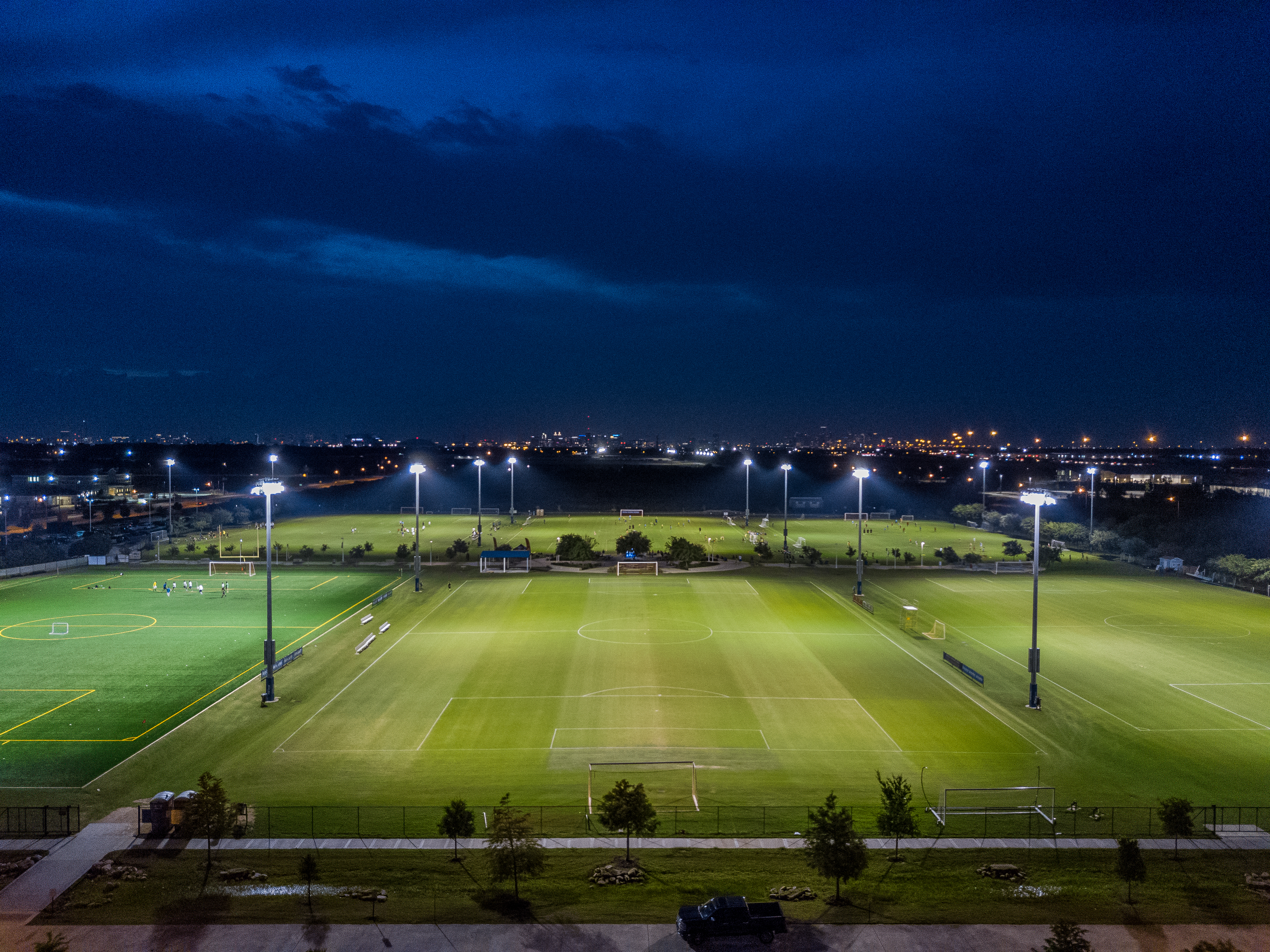
HSP is the permanent home and professional training center for the Dynamo first team and youth academy.

The training facility for the Dynamo, Houston Dash and academy teams is located at the Houston Sports Park (HSP). Opened in 2011, the complex features seven soccer fields, field lighting, and parking. All of the fields feature Bermuda grass, except one that contains FieldTurf. Four fields are reserved exclusively for use by the Dynamo, Dash and visiting professional teams. The remaining fields are available for public rental. The training facility is located 10 miles south of Shell Energy Stadium and was built through a partnership with the City of Houston.

== Club culture ==
=== Supporters ===
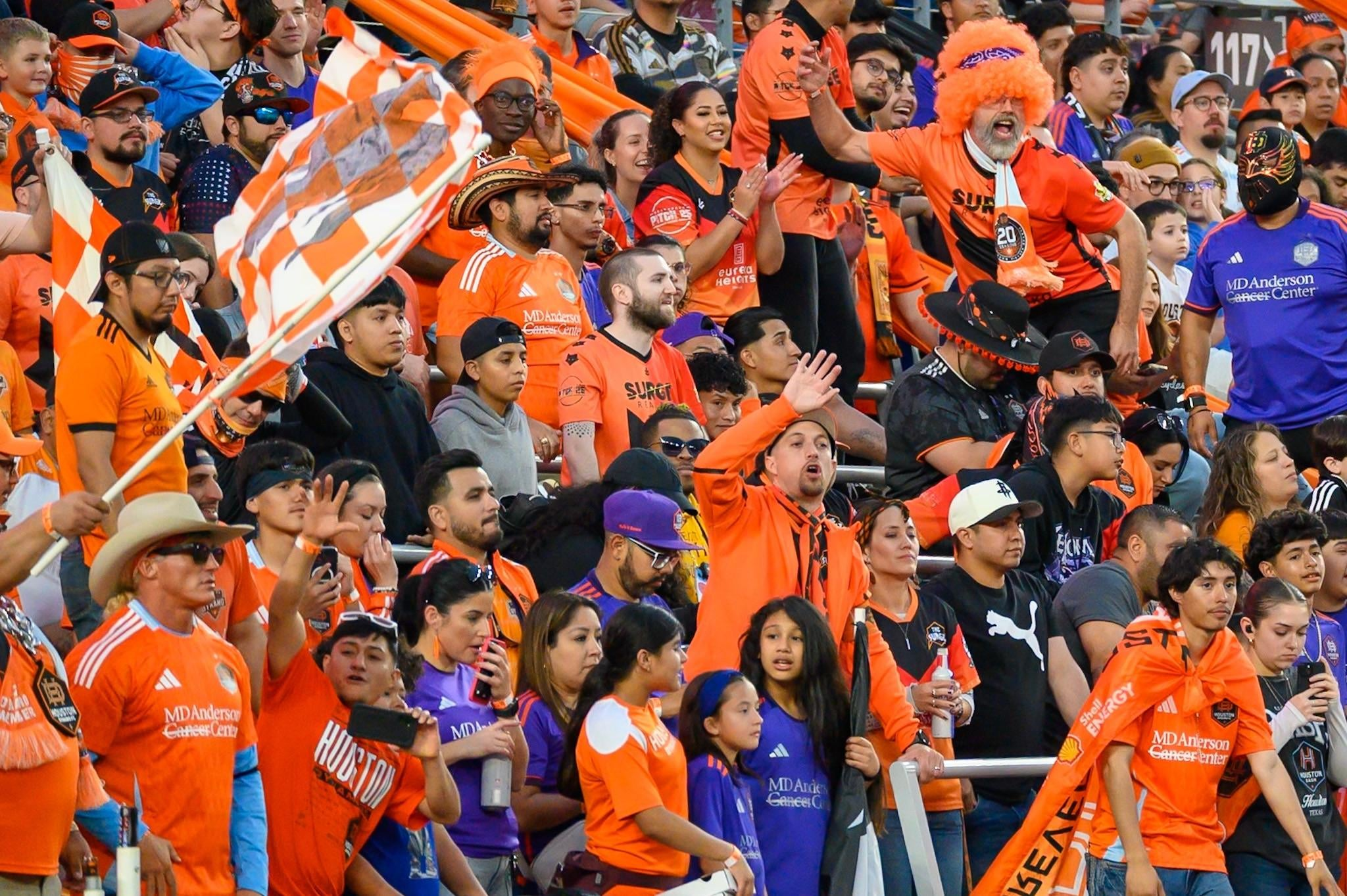
Dynamo supporters in 2025

The first ever match attracted 25,462 fans against Colorado Rapids on April 2, 2006, at Robertson Stadium. Attendance gradually declined throughout the remainder of the spring and summer months. During July and August, they played five matches at Robertson Stadium, and the average attendance for those matches was 10,348.

The team's attendance figures received a boost on August 9 when they played a game against Los Angeles Galaxy in Houston's Reliant Stadium as part of a double-header, with the other game being an exhibition match between FC Barcelona and Mexican side Club América, which attracted a crowd of 70,550. Home attendance began to rise again as the weather cooled and the playoffs approached.

For the 2006 season, they averaged 18,935 over the 16 regular season home games. Attendance remained high during their playoff run, where home attendance was 17,440 and 23,107 in games against Chivas USA and Colorado Rapids. Dynamo fans contributed greatly to the sell-out crowd of 22,427 in the 2006 MLS Cup, which was played about 275 miles (450 km) from Houston, in Frisco.

There are four officially recognized supporter groups, El Batallón (est. 2006), Texian Army (est. 2006), Bandera Negra and The Surge. La Bateria and Brickwall Firm are former supporter groups.

=== Mascot ===
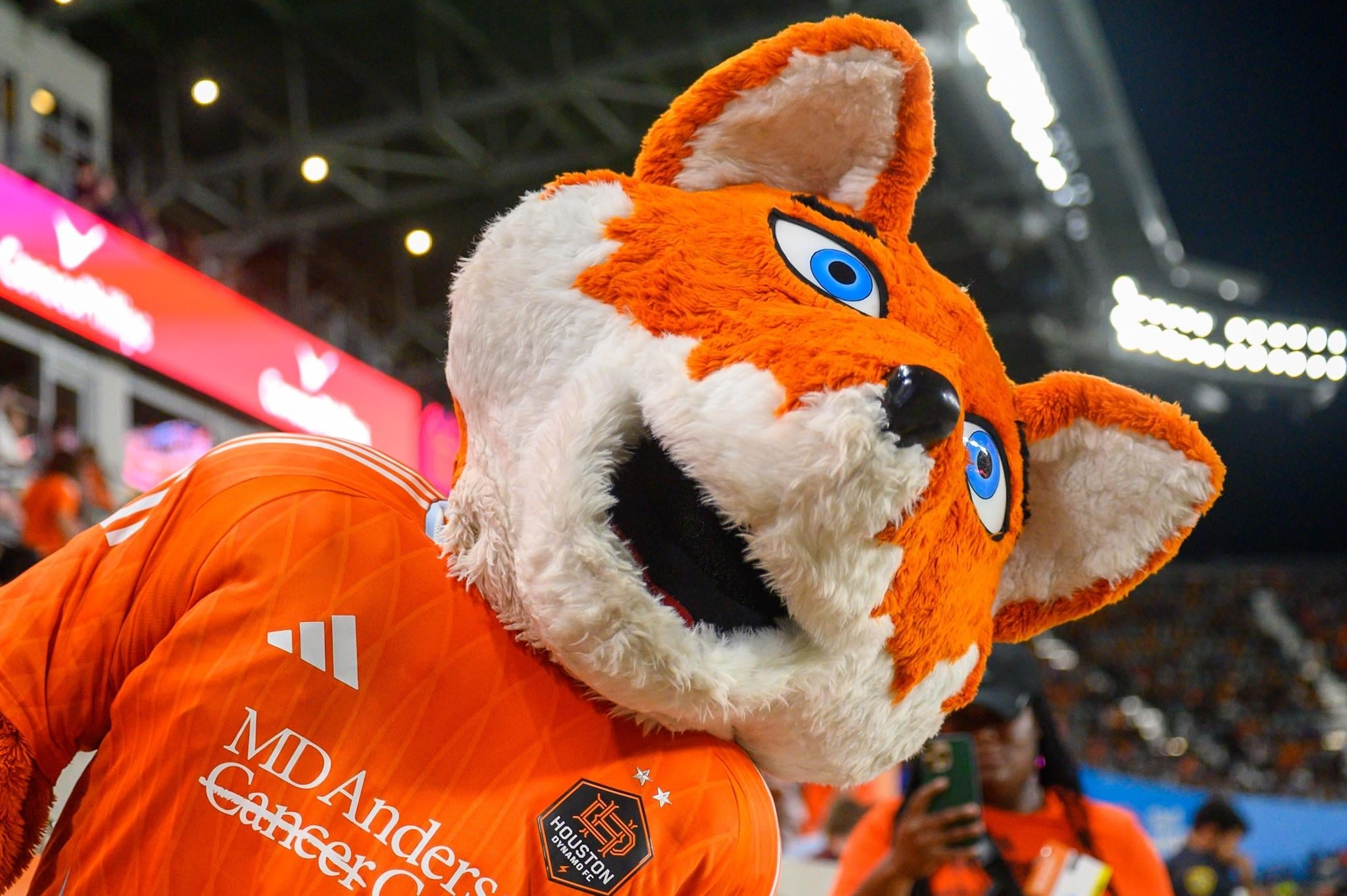
Dynamo Diesel during a match in 2025

In 2007, Houston started a search for a mascot by asking members of The Art Institute of Houston to submit drawings, from which several finalists were selected and an official mascot would be decided through an online poll, both for the mascot design and name. The winning design, by Eric Hulsey and Leslie Lopez, was of an orange-haired fox and named Dynamo Diesel. He was unveiled at the Houston Zoo on April 3, 2007. Dynamo Diesel began working alongside the Houston Dynamo marketing and community outreach programs.

=== Rivalries ===
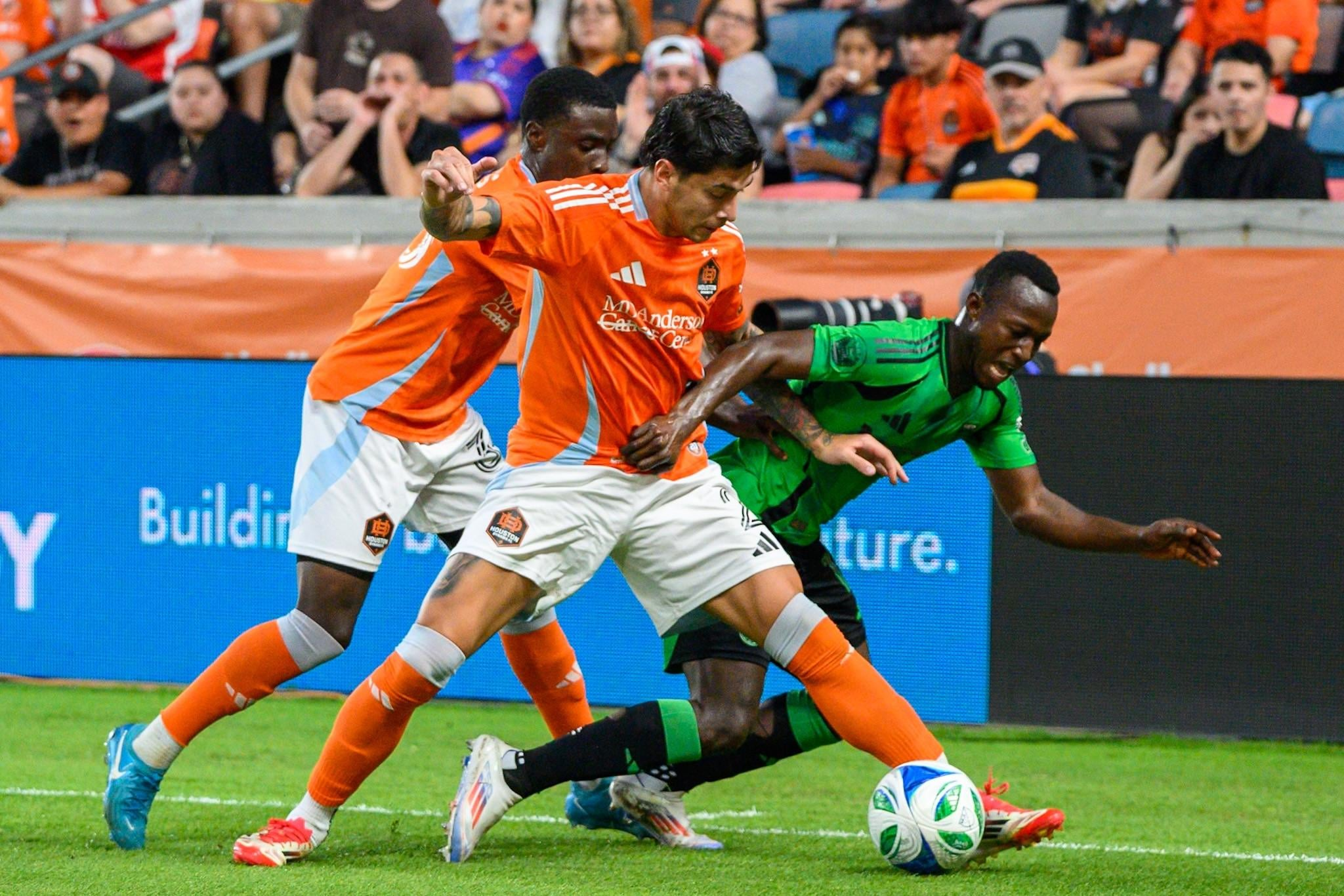
Franco Escobar challenges Austin FC's Osman Bukari for the ball in 2025

Houston Dynamo's main rival is FC Dallas, who they play in the Texas Derby. Since the introduction of Austin FC in 2021, the three teams compete for the Copa Tejas, a trophy handed out to the best MLS team in the state.

The Dynamo have also developed a rivalry with Sporting Kansas City after facing each other in the playoffs and the US Open Cup multiple times.

== Broadcasting ==
From 2023, every Dynamo match is available via MLS Season Pass on the Apple TV app. Prior to this all-streaming deal, the club was aired on various TV stations in the Houston market, as well as whichever linear MLS TV partner had national rights.

=== Radio ===
The majority of Houston Dynamo matches are broadcast locally in English and Spanish. ESPN Houston 97.5 FM is the English radio partner with Glenn Davis.

TUDN Radio Houston 93.3 FM is the club's Spanish radio partner. Daniel Mejia is the play-by-play commentator with Cesar Procel serving as the color analyst.

== Players and staff ==
=== Current roster ===
As of September 21, 2026

Note: Flags indicate national team as defined under FIFA eligibility rules; some limited exceptions apply. Players may hold more than one non-FIFA nationality.

No.	Pos.	Nation	Player
1	GK	USA	Jimmy Maurer
3	DF	BRA	Antônio Carlos
4	DF	URU	Marcelo Saracchi
5	DF	BRA	Lucas Halter
6	MF	BRA	Artur
9	FW	RSA	Lyle Foster (on loan from Burnley)
11	MF	GER	Lawrence Ennali
14	MF	USA	Duane Holmes
16	MF	MEX	Héctor Herrera
17	FW	USA	Nick Markanich (on loan from Castellón)
18	MF	MLI	Diadie Samassékou
19	MF	POL	Mateusz Bogusz (DP)
20	FW	BRA	Guilherme (DP)

No.	Pos.	Nation	Player
21	DF	ARG	Franco Negri
22	MF	MEX	Matthew Arana (HG)
23	FW	USA	Duncan McGuire
24	MF	NGR	Ibrahim Aliyu
26	GK	USA	Blake Gillingham
27	DF	USA	Reese Miller (HG)
30	MF	ARG	Agustín Bouzat
31	GK	ENG	Jonathan Bond
34	DF	ARG	Agustin Resch
36	DF	BRA	Felipe Andrade
37	MF	USA	Gilberto Rivera
48	FW	USA	Mattheo Dimareli (HG)
—	MF	QAT	Andri Syahputra (on loan from Al-Sailiya)

=== Out on loan ===
Note: Flags indicate national team as defined under FIFA eligibility rules; some limited exceptions apply. Players may hold more than one non-FIFA nationality.

No.	Pos.	Nation	Player
13	DF	USA	Sam Vines (on loan to San Diego FC)
35	GK	USA	Logan Erb (on loan to Corpus Christi)

No.	Pos.	Nation	Player
—	MF	MEX	Sebastián Rodríguez (on loan to Monterrey)

=== Head coaches ===
Name	Nationality	Tenure	G	W	L	T	Win %
Dominic Kinnear	United States	December 16, 2005 – October 25, 2014	288	112	90	86	38.8
Owen Coyle	Republic of Ireland	December 9, 2014 – May 25, 2016	46	14	21	11	30.4
Wade Barrett (interim)	United States	May 28, 2016 – October 26, 2016	22	4	7	11	18.2
Wilmer Cabrera	Colombia	October 28, 2016 – August 13, 2019	93	32	39	22	34.4
Davy Arnaud (interim)	United States	August 14, 2019 – October 24, 2019	9	3	5	1	33.3
Tab Ramos	United States	October 25, 2019 – November 4, 2021	57	10	26	21	17.5
Paulo Nagamura	Brazil	January 3, 2022 – September 5, 2022	29	8	16	5	27.6
Kenny Bundy (interim)	United States	September 5, 2022 – November 8, 2022	5	2	2	1	40.0
Ben Olsen	United States	November 8, 2022 – present	132	51	45	36	39.5

- Note: Record for MLS Regular season games only. As of February 1, 2025.

=== General managers ===
Name	Nat	Tenure
Dominic Kinnear	United States	2005–2014
Matt Jordan	United States	2014–2021
Pat Onstad	Canada	2021–present

=== Ownership history ===
- AEG (2005–2015)
- Gabriel Brener (2008–2022)
- Oscar De La Hoya (2008–2022)
- Ben Guill (2015–2022)
- Jake Silverstein (2015–2021)
- Ted Segal (2021–present)
- Lyle Ayes (2022–present)

=== Staff ===
As of August 5, 2024

Executive
Majority Owner & Chairman	(United States) Ted Segal
Owner/Vice Chairman	(United States) Lyle Ayes
Minority Owner	(United States) James Harden
Minority Owner	(United States) Tim Howard
Houston Dynamo Football Club President	(United States) Jessica O'Neill
General manager	(Canada) Pat Onstad
Technical director	(United States) Asher Mendelsohn
Assistant general manager	(United States) Nick Kowba
Director of methodology	(England) Ben Bartlett
Coaching staff
Head coach	(United States) Ben Olsen
Assistant coach	(Venezuela) Juan Guerra
Assistant coach	(United States) Kenny Bundy
Assistant coach	(Brazil) Marcelo Santos
Assistant coach	(Saint Vincent and the Grenadines) Ezra Hendrickson
Head video analyst	(Canada) Louan Schlicht
Sports performance director/fitness coach	(Republic of Ireland) Paul Caffrey
Head of sports science	(United States) Al Ishida
Strength & conditioning coach	(United States) Anthony Narcisi
Director of sports medicine	(United States) Craig Devine
Head athletic trainer	(United States) Matt Murphy
Assistant athletic trainer	(United States) Juan Castano
Assistant athletic trainer	(United States) Brandi Neeley
Physical therapist	(United States) Micah Kust
Massage therapist	(United States) Ivan Diaz
Scouting coordinator & analyst	(Uruguay) Sebastian Romero
Player care manager	(United States) Martha Carvajal

== Affiliates and club academy ==
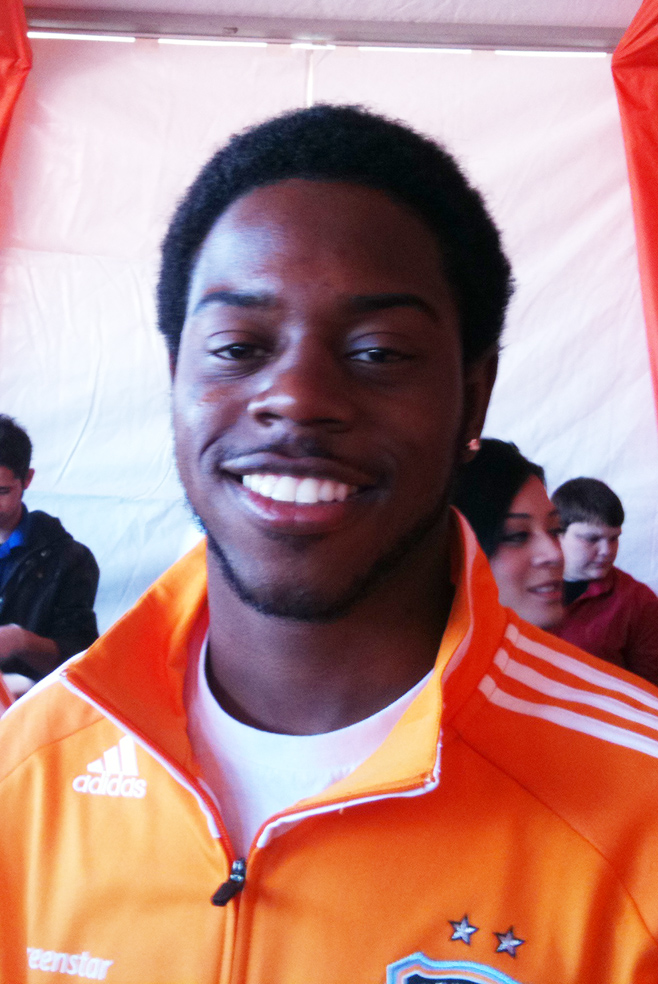
Alex Dixon (of Bay City, Texas) signed a homegrown contract with the club in 2011

The Houston Dynamo Academy was created in 2007 and led by then-Director of Youth Development James Clarkson. On February 27, 2009, the Dynamo signed Tyler Deric, their first homegrown player in club history. The following season Francisco Navas Cobo became the second HGP in Dynamo history. On April 17, 2010, Navas Cobo became the first academy alum to appear in an MLS game for the Dynamo. Alex Dixon became the first academy alum to score a goal with his stoppage time winner against Real Salt Lake on August 20, 2011.

The Houston Dynamo Academy has trained and played their games at Houston Sports Park since it opened in 2011. Prior to that, they used multiple fields around the city.

The Dynamo Academy is currently run by Academy Director Tony Vigil.

For 2014 and 2015, USL-Pro team Charleston Battery was an affiliate with the Dynamo, letting Houston send players there on loan.

In late 2014, the Dynamo met with USL officials about creating a USL team. Rio Grande Valley FC Toros replaced Charleston as the Dynamo's USL affiliate for the 2016 season. The Dynamo ran all soccer operations for the club, sending academy players as well as fringe first team players and players rehabbing from injury to train and play with the Toros throughout the year. In December 2020, RGVFC and the Dynamo restructured the relationship, giving the Toros control over all aspects of their soccer operations. Following the 2021 season, the agreement ended, allowing Rio Grande Valley FC to become an independent club.

Brazos Valley Cavalry previously served as the Dynamo's USL League Two affiliate.

On December 6, 2021, it was announced that the Dynamo would field a team, Houston Dynamo 2, in the inaugural season of MLS Next Pro in 2022. The team plays their games at SaberCats Stadium, which is part of Houston Sports Park.

The Dynamo are affiliated with the Houston Dash of the NWSL. Both the Dynamo and Dash are operated by Houston Dynamo Football Club.

== Honors ==
=== Domestic ===
- MLS Cup
  - Champions (2): 2006, 2007
  - Runners-up (2): 2011, 2012
- U.S. Open Cup
  - Champions (2): 2018, 2023
- Supporters' Shield
  - Runners-up (1): 2008
- Western Conference (Playoff)
  - Champions (2): 2006, 2007
  - Runners-up (3): 2009, 2017, 2023
- Western Conference (Regular Season)
  - Champions (1): 2008
  - Runners-up (3): 2006, 2007, 2009
- Eastern Conference (Playoff)
  - Champions (2): 2011, 2012
  - Runners-up (1): 2013
- Eastern Conference (Regular Season)
  - Runners-up (1): 2011

=== International ===
- North American SuperLiga
  - Runners-up (1): 2008

== Seasons ==
This is a partial list of the last five seasons completed by the Dynamo. For the full season-by-season history, see List of Houston Dynamo seasons.

Season	League											Position		Playoffs	USOC	Continental / Other		Average attendance	Top goalscorer(s)	
Season	Div	League	Pld	W	L	D	GF	GA	GD	Pts	PPG	Conf.	Overall	Playoffs	USOC	Continental / Other		Average attendance	Name(s)	Goals
2018	1	MLS	34	10	16	8	58	58	0	38	1.12	9th	17th	DNQ	W	DNQ		16,906	(Colombia) Mauro Manotas	25
2019	1	MLS	34	12	18	4	49	59	−10	40	1.17	10th	19th	DNQ	Ro16	CONCACAF Champions League Leagues Cup	QF QF	15,674	(Colombia) Mauro Manotas	15
2020	1	MLS	23	4	10	9	30	40	−10	21	0.91	12th	25th	DNQ	NH	MLS is Back Tournament	GS	5,279	(Colombia) Darwin Quintero	7
2021	1	MLS	34	6	16	12	36	54	−18	30	0.88	13th	25th	DNQ	NH	DNQ		12,220	(United States) Fafà Picault	11
2022	1	MLS	34	10	18	6	43	56	−13	36	1.06	13th	25th	DNQ	Ro16	DNQ		16,426	(Paraguay) Sebastián Ferreira	14
2023	1	MLS	34	14	11	9	51	38	13	51	1.5	4th	9th	SF	W	Leagues Cup	Ro16	15,029	(Morocco) (France) Amine Bassi	15

1. Avg. attendance include statistics from league matches only.
2. Top goalscorer(s) includes all goals scored in League, MLS Cup Playoffs, U.S. Open Cup, MLS is Back Tournament, CONCACAF Champions League, FIFA Club World Cup, and other competitive continental matches.

== Team records ==
=== International tournaments ===
By virtue of their MLS Cup victories, the Dynamo entered the CONCACAF Champions Cup and the North American SuperLiga. During the 2008 season, the Dynamo participated in the inaugural Pan-Pacific Championship as well as the inaugural CONCACAF Champions League. The Dynamo participated in the final two seasons of the CONCACAF Champions Cup tournament reaching the semi-finals both times. They have also competed in five editions of the CONCACAF Champions League and reached the quarterfinals on three occasions.

=== Career records ===
- Games played: (United States) Brad Davis (271)
- Goals: (United States) Brian Ching (56)
- Assists: (United States) Brad Davis (104)
- Shots: (United States) Brad Davis (473)
- Wins: (Canada) Pat Onstad (53)
- Shutouts: (Canada) Pat Onstad (37)
- Saves: (Canada) Pat Onstad (384)

MLS regular season only, through December 19, 2019

=== Season records ===
- Goals: (Colombia) Mauro Manotas – 19 (2018)
- Assists: (United States) Brad Davis – 16 (2011)
- Shutouts: (United States) Tally Hall – 12 (2013)

MLS regular season only

== Player awards ==
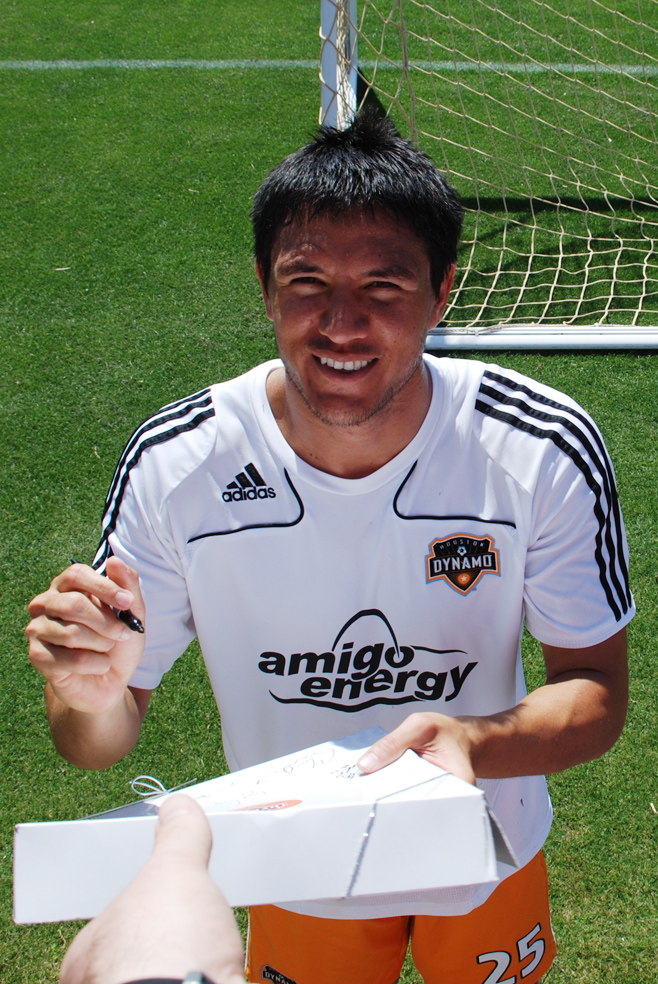
Brian Ching signing autographs, 2008

=== League awards ===
==== MLS Best XI ====
- 2006: Dwayne De Rosario, Ricardo Clark
- 2007: Dwayne De Rosario, Eddie Robinson
- 2009: Geoff Cameron, Stuart Holden
- 2011: Brad Davis
- 2023: Héctor Herrera

==== MLS All-Star ====
- 2006: Brian Ching, Dwayne De Rosario, Eddie Robinson, Ricardo Clark
- 2007: Brian Ching, Dwayne De Rosario, Ricardo Clark
- 2008: Brian Ching, Dwayne De Rosario, Pat Onstad
- 2009: Brad Davis, Brian Ching, Geoff Cameron, Pat Onstad, Stuart Holden
- 2010: Brad Davis, Brian Ching
- 2011: Brad Davis, Corey Ashe, Geoff Cameron, Tally Hall
- 2012: Brad Davis, Geoff Cameron
- 2013: Brad Davis, Corey Ashe
- 2015: DaMarcus Beasley
- 2017: DaMarcus Beasley
- 2018: Alberth Elis
- 2023: Héctor Herrera

==== Goal of the Year ====
- 2006: Brian Ching

==== Save of the Year ====
- 2009: Pat Onstad

==== Fair Play Player award ====
- 2017: DaMarcus Beasley

=== Team awards ===
Season	MVP	Defensive Player of the Year	Newcomer of the Year	Young Player of the Year	Players' Player of the Year	Ref
2006	(Canada) Dwayne De Rosario	(United States) Eddie Robinson	Not Awarded	Not Awarded	Not Awarded	
2007	(United States) Brian Mullan, (Canada) Pat Onstad	(United States) Eddie Robinson	Not Awarded	Not Awarded	Not Awarded	
2008	(United States) Brian Ching	(United States) Bobby Boswell	(United States) Geoff Cameron	(United States) Stuart Holden	Not Awarded	
2009	(United States) Brad Davis	(United States) Geoff Cameron	(United States) Cam Weaver	(Canada) Andre Hainault	Not Awarded	
2010	(United States) Brad Davis	(United States) Bobby Boswell	(Jamaica) Lovel Palmer	(United States) Danny Cruz	Not Awarded	
2011	(United States) Brad Davis	(Canada) Andre Hainault	(Scotland) Adam Moffat	(United States) Will Bruin	Not Awarded	
2012	(United States) Brad Davis	(United States) Bobby Boswell	(Honduras) Boniek García	(United States) Will Bruin	(Honduras) Boniek García	
2013	(United States) Tally Hall	(United States) Kofi Sarkodie	(England) Andrew Driver	(Guyana) Warren Creavalle	(United States) Ricardo Clark	
2014	(Jamaica) Giles Barnes	Not Awarded	(Honduras) Luis Garrido	(Honduras) Luis Garrido	(Jamaica) Giles Barnes	
2015	(United States) Ricardo Clark	(United States) DaMarcus Beasley	(Spain) Raúl Rodríguez	(Argentina) Leonel Miranda	(United States) Ricardo Clark	
2016	(Brazil) Alex Lima	(United States) Joe Willis	(United States) Andrew Wenger	(Colombia) Mauro Manotas	(Brazil) Alex Lima	
2017	(Colombia) Juan David Cabezas	(Panama) Adolfo Machado	(Honduras) Alberth Elis	(Colombia) Mauro Manotas	(Honduras) Alberth Elis	
2018	(Colombia) Mauro Manotas	(United States) DaMarcus Beasley	(Venezuela) Alejandro Fuenmayor	(Honduras) Alberth Elis	(Colombia) Mauro Manotas	
2019	(Argentina) Matías Vera	(Slovenia) Aljaž Struna	(Argentina) Matías Vera	(United States) Memo Rodriguez	(United States) DaMarcus Beasley	
2020	Not Awarded	Not Awarded	Not Awarded	Not Awarded	Not Awarded	
2021	(United States) Fafà Picault	(Zimbabwe) Teenage Hadebe	(Zimbabwe) Teenage Hadebe	(United States) Griffin Dorsey	(United States) Fafà Picault	
2022	Not Awarded	Not Awarded	Not Awarded	Not Awarded	Not Awarded	
2023	(Mexico) Héctor Herrera	(United States) Steve Clark	(Brazil) Artur	(Colombia) Nelson Quiñónes	(Mexico) Héctor Herrera	
2024	(Brazil) Artur	(Brazil) Micael	(Argentina) Ezequiel Ponce	(United States) Brooklyn Raines	(Brazil) Artur	

== Attendance ==
=== Average season attendance ===
Season	Regular Season	MLS Playoffs
2006	18,935	20,274
2007	15,883	30,530
2008	16,939	30,053
2009	17,047	27,465
2010	17,310	DNQ
2011	17,694	24,749
2012	20,982	21,395
2013	19,923	21,395
2014	20,117	DNQ
2015	20,621	DNQ
2016	19,021	DNQ
2017	17,500	17,319
2018	16,906	DNQ
2019	15,674	DNQ
2020	4,857	DNQ
2021	12,220	DNQ
2022	16,426	DNQ

=== Highest attended matches ===
Attendance	Date	Match	Notes
30,972	11/10/07	HOU vs. KC	2007 Western Conference Final
30,588	10/7/07	HOU vs. LA	2007 Regular Season Match
30,361	10/18/08	HOU vs. LA	2008 Regular Season Match
30,088	11/2/07	HOU vs. DAL	2007 Western Conference Semi-final
30,053	11/9/08	HOU vs. NY	2008 Western Conference Semi-final
