= Francisco Navas =

American soccer player

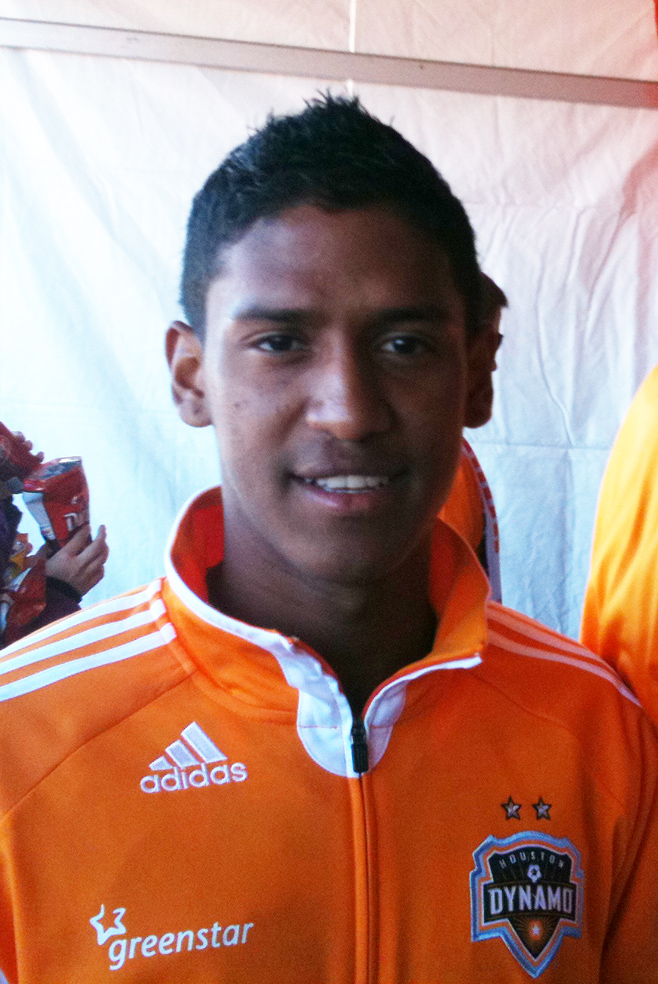

Personal information
- Full name: Francisco Navas Cobo
- Date of birth: November 17, 1991 (age 34)
- Place of birth: Houston, Texas, United States
- Height: 5 ft 10 in (1.78 m)
- Position: Midfielder

Youth career
- 2006–2009: Deportivo Cali
- 2009–2010: Houston Dynamo

Senior career*
Years	Team	Apps	(Gls)
2010–2011	Houston Dynamo	1	(0)
2012	Atlético Bucaramanga	4	(0)
2013	Uniautónoma FC	2	(0)
2014	Universitario Popayán	8	(0)
2015–2017	Deportes Quindío	45	(2)

International career^{‡}
2010	United States U20	8	(0)
- * Club domestic league appearances and goals as of December 9, 2016 ‡ National team caps and goals as of November 17, 2010

Francisco Navas Cobo (born November 17, 1991, in Houston, Texas), known as Francisco Navas, is an American soccer player.

== Career ==
=== Professional ===
Navas was invited to go on trial with the Houston Dynamo, when preseason training started in early February. After having a successful trial for the first team, he became the second home grown player to be promoted from the Dynamo's developmental academy (after Houston Dynamo goalkeeper Tyler Deric), when he signed a professional development contract with Houston on March 5, 2010.

He made his professional debut on April 17, 2010, in a game against Chivas USA.

Navas was waived by Houston on November 23, 2011.

=== International ===
At age 14, Navas participated at a United States Under-15 camp. At age 18, he made his national team debut with the under-20 team on March 28, 2010, at the 2010 Dallas Cup.
