= 2010 Seattle Sounders FC season =

American soccer team season

Seattle Sounders FC
2010 season
- General manager: Adrian Hanauer
- Head coach: Sigi Schmid
- Stadium: Qwest Field
- Major League Soccer: Conference: 4th Overall: 6th
- MLS Cup playoffs: Conference semifinals
- U.S. Open Cup: Winners
- CONCACAF Champions League: Group stage
- Top goalscorer: League: Fredy Montero; Steve Zakuani (10 each); All: Fredy Montero (12 goals)
- Highest home attendance: 36,386 (Aug. 28 vs. Chicago)
- Lowest home attendance: 35,924 (Apr. 17 vs. Kansas City)
- Average home league attendance: 36,174
- Biggest win: League: 4–0 at Columbus (Sep. 18)
- Biggest defeat: League: 0–4 vs. LA Galaxy (May 8)
Home colors	Away colors	Third colors

The 2010 Seattle Sounders FC season was the club's second season in Major League Soccer, the top tier of professional soccer in the United States. It was the 30th season played by a team bearing the Sounders name.

The Sounders opened the regular season with a 2–0 victory over expansion side Philadelphia Union on March 25, 2010, at Qwest Field in Seattle. They closed out the regular season on October 23, 2010, with a 1–2 loss to the Houston Dynamo. Seattle qualified for the playoffs but lost to the Los Angeles Galaxy in the Western Conference Semifinals.

In addition to MLS play, the Sounders defended their U.S. Open Cup title by defeating the Columbus Crew in the final played at Qwest Field. Seattle also participated in their first CONCACAF Champions League as a MLS club and defeated El Salvadoran club Isidro Metapán in the preliminary round to qualify for the group stage. The Sounders lost all but one of their group stage matches and finished at the bottom of Group C.

== Background ==
The 2010 season is the second season for Seattle Sounders FC who began play in 2009 as the league's 15th team. Seattle is the defending champion of the U.S. Open Cup. In their inaugural season, Sounders FC became the second MLS expansion team in league history (Chicago was first) to win the U.S. Open Cup tournament in their first season. They did so by defeating D.C. United 2–1 on the road at RFK Stadium. In winning the U.S. Open Cup tournament, Sounders FC qualified for the preliminary round of the 2010–11 CONCACAF Champions League.

In 2009 Sounders FC became the second MLS expansion team in league history (Chicago again was first) to qualify for the playoffs in their first season. Seattle finished the regular season with a record of 12 wins, 7 losses, and 11 ties and set an all-time MLS record for average attendance of 30,943 fans per game. Sounders FC's inaugural season came to an end in the 2009 MLS Cup Playoffs when they lost in the conference semifinals to the Houston Dynamo with a 1–0 aggregate score in a two-legged series. During the 2009 season, all 15 Sounders FC MLS regular season home matches, their home playoff match, and their 4 home U.S. Open Cup matches (played at Starfire Sports Complex) were sold out. Ahead of the club's second MLS season, the total allotment of 32,000 season tickets were sold out—an increase of 10,000 from the 2009 season.

== Review ==
=== Preseason ===
On November 25, 2009, Sebastian Le Toux was drafted away from Seattle by the Philadelphia Union as part of the 2009 MLS Expansion Draft, and waived midfielder Michael Fucito and defenders Evan Brown and Lamar Neagle. Le Toux had been acquired the previous year as Sounders FC's first ever signing.

Seattle's preseason was broken up into two stages. The team went to Arizona for preseason fitness and then to Murcia in Spain for the La Manga Cup, a preseason tournament.

In the 2010 MLS SuperDraft the Sounders chose UCLA forward David Estrada in the first round, Villanova midfielder/forward Mike Seamon in the second round, and San Diego State midfielder Jamel Wallace. On March 4, the club announced the signing of Swiss International striker Blaise Nkufo. He will be joining the club after the FC Twente season is over and the 2010 FIFA World Cup. On March 11, the inaugural Seattle Sounders FC Community Shield preseason match was played against the Portland Timbers continuing the Portland-Seattle rivalry. Seattle lost to Portland 1–0 in front of 18,606 supporters while rain poured down.

=== March ===
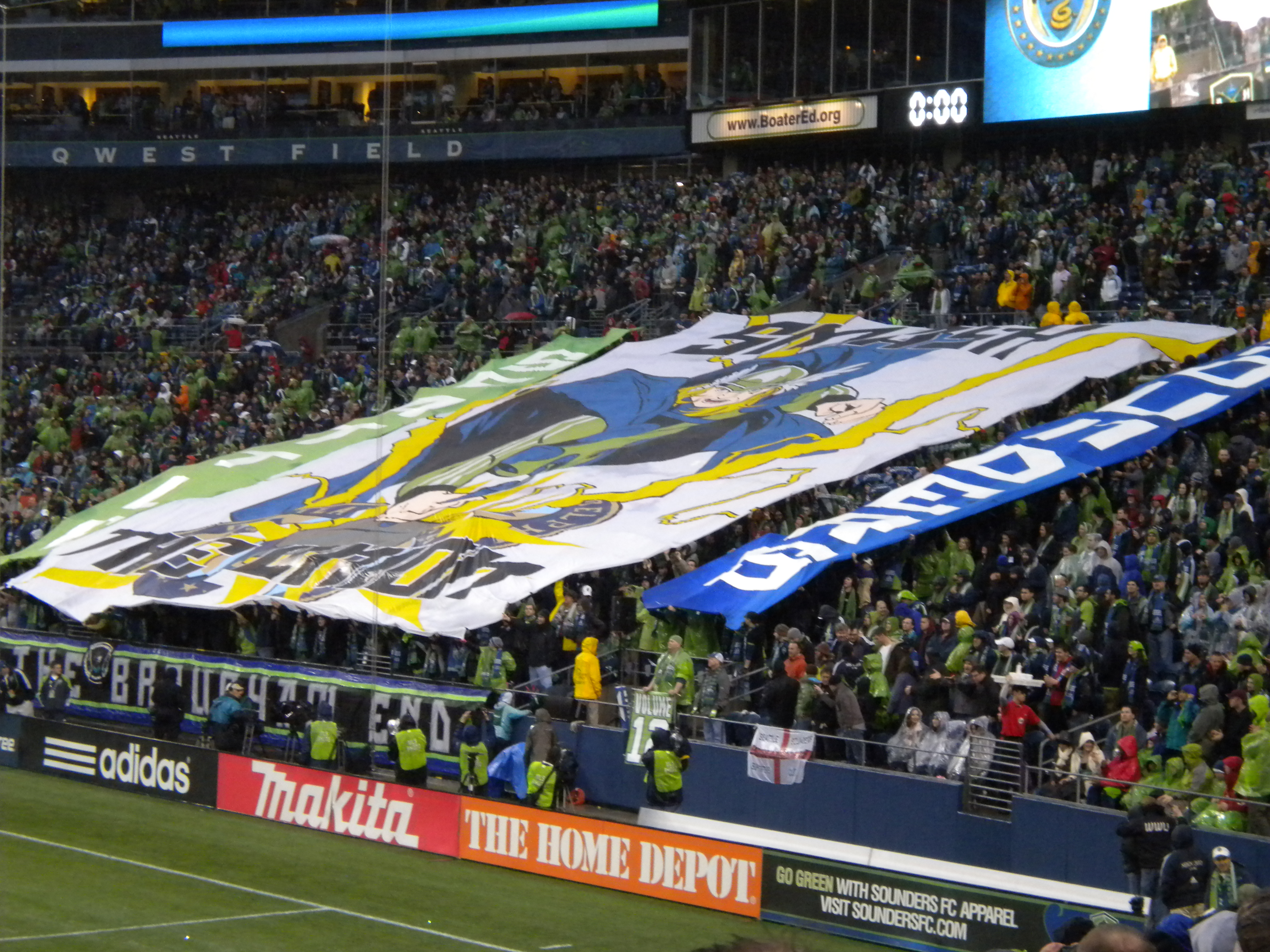
The Emerald City Supporters display their tifo before the first game of the 2010 MLS season at Qwest Field between Seattle Sounders FC and the Philadelphia Union.

Seattle was chosen for the second consecutive season to host MLS First Kick, the first match of the MLS season, which was held on Thursday, March 25 and nationally televised on ESPN2. Joe Roth, Sounders FC Majority Owner stated, "Being selected to participate in the first match of the season is a testament to the passion and energy of our fans." Their opponent was the expansion franchise Philadelphia Union, the league's 16th team as they played in their inaugural match. Seattle won the match 2–0 with goals scored by Brad Evans in the 12th minute and Freddy Montero in the 43rd minute. The attendance of 36,241 set a team record for an MLS regular-season or postseason game.

=== April ===
On April 2, Sounders FC hosted the New York Red Bulls for their second league match. New York prevailed 1–0 with Macoumba Kandji scoring the lone goal off a corner kick. Seattle had several scoring chances later including a club record 12 corner kicks, but was unable to equalize.

On April 9, Seattle played their first road match of the season, facing the defending MLS Cup champion, Real Salt Lake, in Sandy, Utah. Sounders FC scored twice in the match, first on a Steve Zakuani counter-attack goal in the 11th minute and then again in the 73rd minute when Tyrone Marshall headed in a free kick from Freddie Ljungberg. Salt Lake was able to answer each with a goal of their own, the latter coming in the final moments of extra time. The match ended in a 2–2 draw.

The following week, on April 17, Seattle returned home to face the undefeated Kansas City Wizards. The game appeared to be ending a scoreless tie until late substitute Michael Fucito scored his first career goal in 92nd minute of the match off a throw in from Brad Evans. Sounders FC defeated Kansas City 1–0. The following week, Seattle had two road games in a 4-day period. First they traveled to Frisco, Texas to face FC Dallas on April 22. Steve Zakuani and Fredy Montero scored for Sounders FC while Jeff Cunningham scored two penalty kicks for Dallas, the second of which coming in extra time on a questionable call. The Dallas game ended in a 2–2 tie. During the second leg of the road trip on April 25, Sounders FC was defeated 2–0 by Toronto FC at BMO Field. Seattle conceded their first ever goal to Toronto when Dwayne De Rosario scored in the 58th minute. He later assisted O'Brian White on a second goal in the 76th minute.

=== May ===
Sounders FC began May with a tie at home against the Columbus Crew. Steve Zakuani scored an early breakaway goal in the 8th minute to take the lead. However, Seattle's stoppage time problems continued as the Crew's Steven Lenhart scored off a header in the first minute of stoppage time before the half. The game ended 1–1.

We're in this for the long haul. We need them (the fans) to be in it for the long haul. That wasn't Sounders soccer. And it was quite frankly embarrassing, humiliating, and they don't deserve that.

— Adrian Hanauer, Seattle Sounders FC owner and General Manager regarding the refund for the LA match

The following week, on May 8, Sounders FC hosted the Los Angeles Galaxy. Seattle's continued inability to score and their recent trend of defensive breakdowns culminated in an embarrassing 4–0 loss to the Galaxy. This was Seattle's worst ever defeat at home and it was played in front of a team record attendance for a regular season match of 36,273 fans. Sounders FC newcomer Miguel Montaño made his debut with the club in the defeat to the Galaxy. The day after the lopsided defeat to Los Angeles, Sounders FC owner Adrian Hanauer announced a refund for all 32,000 season ticket holders for the embarrassment and indicated that changes were in the works for the club.

Sounders FC regrouped from the difficult loss to LA the next week when they visited the New York Red Bulls. Fredy Montero's absence from the starting lineup was a surprising change in the match. Montero, however, was subbed on late in the game and provided the winning goal in the 85th minute for a 1–0 victory. During the first game of the 2010 Heritage Cup on May 22, the team lost 1–0 to the San Jose Earthquakes at Qwest. Chris Wondolowski scored 11 minutes in the match, lengthening the "scoring drought" for the Sounders FC at home.

Three days later, May 26, the team participated in their first friendly match of the season, winning it 3–0 in a shutout against Boca Juniors. Roger Levesque, Pat Noonan and Mike Seamon each scored goals, the latter in his debut for the team. The team ended the month with another 1–0 loss on May 29, this one against the Colorado Rapids, on the road; Conor Casey scored the only goal of the match.

=== June ===
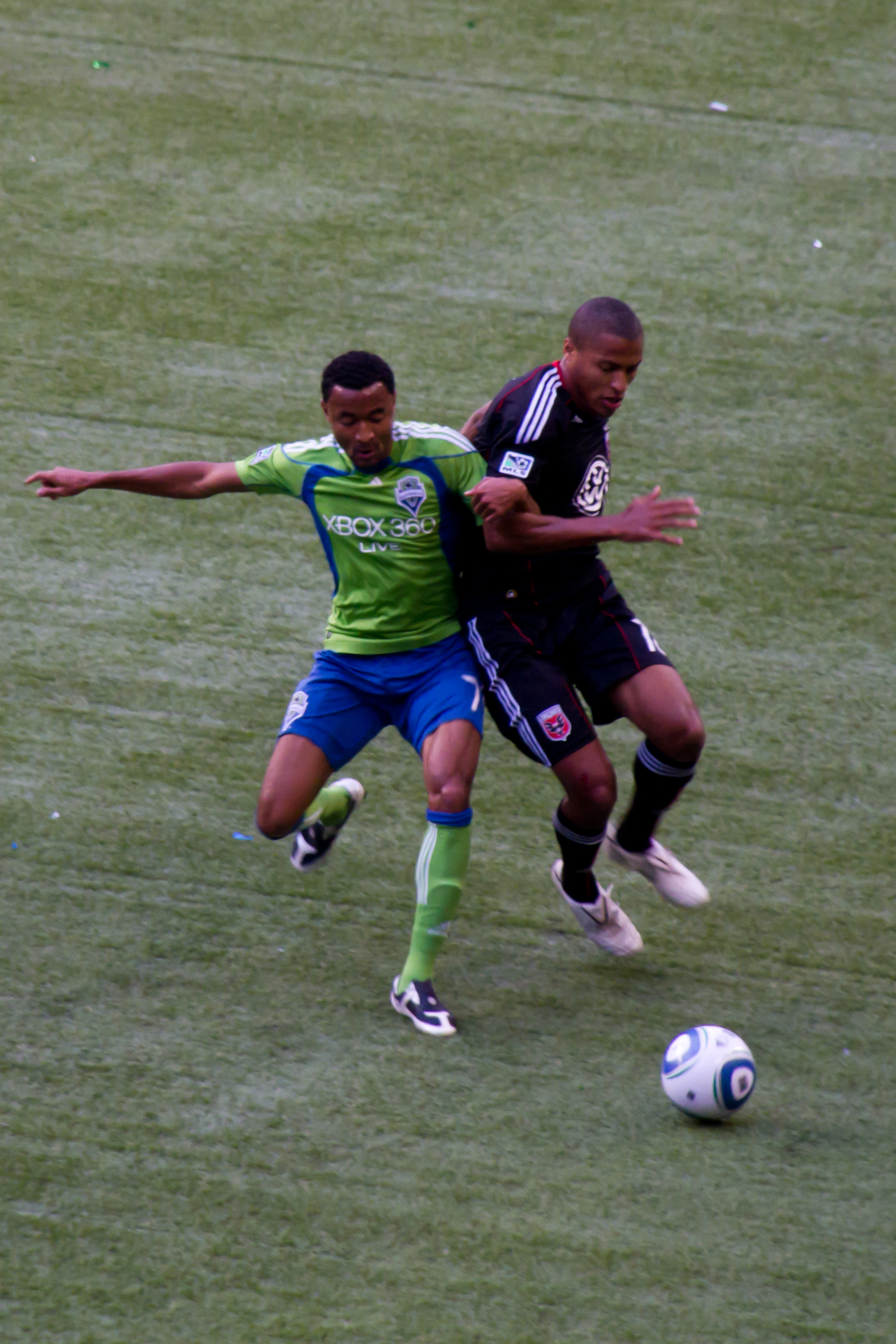
James Riley fights Jordan Graye of D.C. United for ball possession on June 10.

The Sounders FC began June with a 3–0 win against the New England Revolution at home, ending the scoreless pattern. Leo González scored in the fifth minute and started a 3-goal streak. Steve Zakuani volleyed in another goal in the 24th minute off of a kick by Brad Evans. The final goal of the match was scored by Fredy Montero in the 42nd minute, while the second half was more defensive. During the final MLS match before the World Cup break, D.C. United defeated the team 3–2 in a nationally televised game. Chris Pontius scored all three of D.C.'s goals, two in the first half and one in the second. In the 90th minute, James Riley scored a goal and was accompanied by Montero's goal one minute later.

After the World Cup break, the Sounders FC went to play the Philadelphia Union at the new PPL Park in front of a crowd of 18,755 during a humid day. Pat Noonan scored the first ever goal at the stadium shortly before halftime, putting the team ahead 1–0. Former Sounders FC player Sebastian Le Toux scored the equalizer on a penalty kick in the 55th minute and later assisted in the two following goals in the 79th and 84th minutes, making the team lose 3–1 to the Union.

The Sounders FC began their U.S. Open Cup defense in a rematch against rivals to the south Portland Timbers at a sold-out PGE Park. Nate Jaqua scored in the 13th minute, but Portland's Bright Dike scored the equalizer in the 37th minute. The game was tied 1–1 and went into the franchise's first penalty shootout. Defender Zach Scott scored the final penalty to give the team a 4–3 win on penalties.

=== July ===
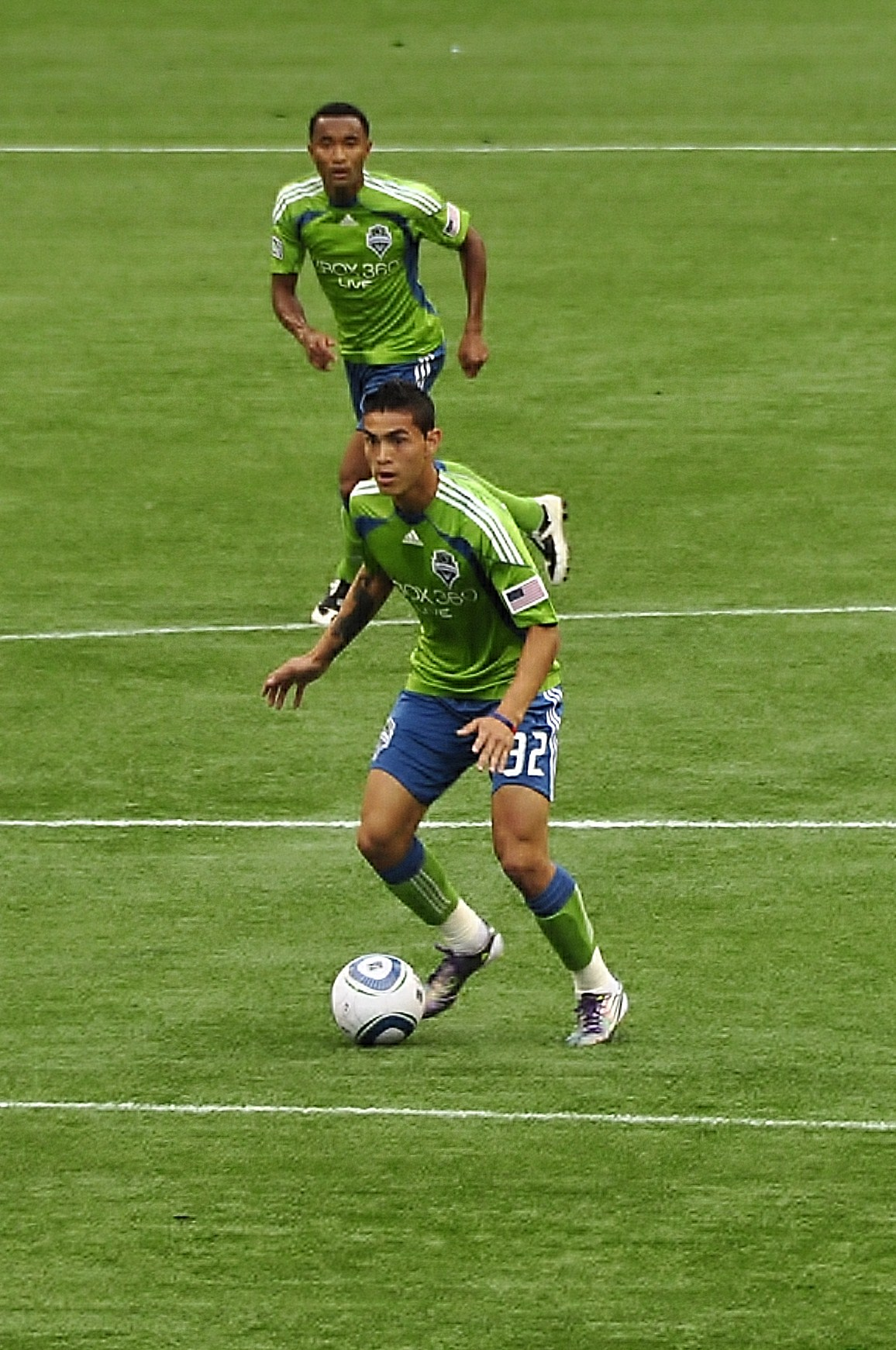
Miguel Montaño and James Riley during the match against Dallas

The Sounders FC went down to Carson, California on July 4 to play the Los Angeles Galaxy, who they previously lost to 4–0 at home in May. The game was also the first game for Landon Donovan and Edson Buddle since the World Cup. LA took an early lead, with Buddle scoring off a corner by Donovan in the 18th minute, followed by a goal by Juninho in the 48th minute. Steve Zakuani scored the team's only goal of the match, in the 66th minute, before an own goal by James Riley in the 78th minute.

After the loss to LA, both teams traveled to the Starfire Sports Complex for a rematch, in the U.S. Open Cup. The game was scoreless until Nate Jaqua scored in the 50th minute, repeating in the 62nd minute. The game ended in a 2–0 victory for the Sounders FC, ensuring a semifinal spot against Chivas USA. The following Sunday, the team played their first post-World Cup home game against FC Dallas, drawing 1–1 in front of a crowd of 36,091. Montero headed in the ball in the 14th minute to lead 1–0. In the 56th minute, Miguel Montaño, playing in his first MLS start, was sent off the field and the Sounders FC played a man down for the rest of the match, eventually conceding a goal by David Ferreira in the 87th minute.

Following the tie to FC Dallas, the team traveled east to play D.C. United, who they previously lost to 3–2 at home in June. The game remained scoreless until the 89th minute, when Roger Levesque headed in the game winner, winning 1–0 and ending a 4-game MLS winless streak. During the second and final friendly of the season, the Sounders FC suffered a 2–1 loss to Celtic F.C. in front of a crowd of 45,631 at home. In the 30th minute, goalkeeper Terry Boss was sent off after tripping Georgios Samaras and Fredy Montero was taken out of the game to make way for the debut of third goalkeeper Jordan Jennings. Samaras converted a penalty kick and was joined by a goal by Paddy McCourt for a 2–0 lead for Celtic. David Estrada attempted to tie it up in the 64th minute, but the game ended at 2–1.

The team returned to action on July 25 at home against the Colorado Rapids in a game nationally televised on Fox Soccer Channel. Steve Zakuani got the Sounders on the board in the eighth minute, but Colorado's Omar Cummings answered thirty seconds later, technically in the ninth. Zakuani converted an opportunity in the 18th minute. The game ended 2–1, before the second-largest crowd of the season, 36,333. The Sounders continued their winning streak at home with a 1–0 victory against Isidro Metapán in the CONCACAF Champions League preliminary round. Seven yellow cards were given, four of which to the team, and the game was scoreless at halftime. Substitute Fredy Montero shot from 35 yards out in the 60th minute and the ball bounced into the net.

Uruguay midfielder Álvaro Fernández was signed on July 29, meanwhile Freddie Ljungberg was traded to the Chicago Fire on July 30. After Fernández addition the trade of Ljungberg, the team won 1–0 in San Jose by a header in the 26th minute by Fredy Montero.

=== August ===
The Sounders began August at Estadio Cuscatlán in San Salvador, El Salvador against Isidro Metapán for the second match of a two-legged series for the preliminary round of the CONCACAF Champions League, which they led 1–0 on aggregate. Anel Canales of Metapán scored in the 17th minute and Metapán led 1–0 at halftime. Newly signed midfielder Álvaro Fernández headed a pass from James Riley in the 74th minute, which equalized the score and let the team advance 2–1 on aggregate.

After the win over Metapán, the team returned home to a 2–0 win over the Houston Dynamo. The match remained scoreless at halftime, meanwhile two Sounders were given yellow cards: Sanna Nyassi and James Riley. Blaise Nkufo was also given a yellow card minutes into the second half and two Houston players also received them. In the 64th minute, Fredy Montero received a goal kick from Kasey Keller and scored, giving the team a 1–0 lead. Álvaro Fernández made the lead 2–0 shortly after subbing on in the 88th minute.

The following Saturday, the Sounders traveled to the Home Depot Center to play against Chivas USA. The game ended in a 0–0 draw, with Jeff Parke earning his first yellow card of the season in the 89th minute and Leo González was sent off, along with Mariano Trujillo of Chivas in the 91st minute after aggressive play.

On August 28, Freddie Ljungberg returned to Qwest Field as a member of the visiting Chicago Fire. While Ljungberg was applauded before and after the game, the crowd jeered each time he touched the ball. In a rough first half that included 19 combined fouls and three yellow cards, Chicago struck first when Jeff Parke was deemed to have handled the ball in his own penalty area. John Thorrington converted the penalty in the 28th minute. Seattle responded soon thereafter with Fredy Montero scoring in the 36th minute with a far post strike to beat Sean Johnson. The teams stayed level through the second half and into stoppage time. In the 92nd minute, however, James Riley took a quick throw in on the right side to Nathan Sturgis who found Montero open on the far post. Montero headed the ball down and past the Chicago goalkeeper for the game-winner making the final scoreline 2–1.

=== September ===
We're very excited. We want to sell out Qwest and we want to be able to hoist the trophy in front of all of those people.

— Sigi Schmid, Seattle Sounders FC head coach regarding playing for the U.S. Open Cup final at home

September would see Seattle playing matches in three competitions, six matches away from Seattle, and eight matches total. Continuing their U.S. Open Cup defense, Seattle took on Chivas USA at the Starfire Sports Complex on September 1. In front of a crowd of 4,547, the Sounders secured a 3–1 victory and their place in the 2010 U.S. Open Cup final.

On September 4, the Sounders traveled to Gillette Stadium to face the New England Revolution. Following an altercation between Patrick Ianni and Shalrie Joseph, New England scored three goals in 11 minutes to win the match by a score of 3–1

Returning to Qwest Field, the Sounders played to a 0–0 draw with Real Salt Lake on September 9.

Sounders owners chartered an airplane to take the team to Estadio Ricardo Saprissa Aymá in San José, Costa Rica to face C.D. Saprissa in Champions League play on September 14. Leo Gonzalez was sent off in the 38th minute and the home side capitalized on the man advantage to win the match 2–0

The team flew directly from San José to face the Columbus Crew on September 18. Striker Blaise Nkufo scored his first goal as a Sounder and added two more to record a hat trick. Nathan Sturgis converted a penalty kick after Sanna Nassi was fouled in the penalty area to make the final score 0–4.

Again chartering a plane for the Champions League campaign, on September 22 Seattle flew to Monterrey, Mexico to face C.F. Monterrey of the Mexican Primera División at Estadio Tecnológico. With an own goal from Monterrey midfielder Hiram Ricardo Mier and a goal from Michael Fucito just before halftime, Seattle had a 0–2 lead going into the second half and it looked that Seattle might become the first MLS team to win a match in Mexico. Seattle could not maintain the lead though, and gave up three goals in a span of four minutes. Monterrey won the match 3–2

Continuing their travels, the Sounders again flew directly to their next destination. This time, to face the Chicago Fire, they flew directly to Toyota Park in Bridgeview, Illinois on September 25. Kasey Keller was tested repeatedly but kept a clean sheet and Blase Nkufo scored in the 88th minute to give the Sounders the 0–1 win.

In their final match of the month, on September 29, Sounders FC returned home face C.D. Marathón in Champions League play. The Sounders recorded their first points in group play as Michael Fucito scored goals in the 21st and 68th minutes. Even though the Sounders earned three points, they were eliminated from the competition due to the 2–2 draw between Monterrey and Saprissa.

=== October ===
The month of October started off with the Sounders needing only two wins to qualify for the playoffs. They would need to win against incoming Toronto FC, whom were looking for one of the final seeds in the playoffs, and then travel out to Kansas City to take on the Wizards, another team longing for postseason action.

On October 2, a 3–2 victory over the Reds gave Rave Green one win closer to post-season action. Seattle would then travel out to Kansas City and nab a 2–1 victory, securing the Sounders playoff action. Goals from Gambian international Sanna Nyassi and Uruguayan international, Álvaro Fernández led the Sounders over the Wizards.

From there, the Sounders would take a comfortable 2–1 victory over Chivas USA before losing their season finale in Houston 1–2.

Finishing 6th overall, Seattle won the fourth-seed in the Western Conference championship in the MLS Cup playoffs going against Supporters' Shield-winners, Los Angeles Galaxy. The Sounders hosted the first game in front of a crowd of 35,000; the highest ever for a quarterfinal match in MLS playoff history. The records were hindered, thanks to a 38th-minute goal from Golden Boot-runner up, Edson Buddle; who scored a volley from a third of the pitch out that caught Kasey Keller off-guard. The Sounders would then head into Los Angeles down a goal in the aggregate series.

=== November ===
On November 7, the Sounders traveled out to Los Angeles to take on the Galaxy. Down 1–0, the Sounders were hoping to salvage this by rallying to overcome the deficit. It seemingly faded off thanks to a pair of early first half goals from the Galaxy's Omar Gonzalez and Edson Buddle, giving the Galaxy a 3-0 aggregate lead over the Sounders.

Throughout most of the game the Sounders continuously pressed the Galaxy hoping to pull close to their lead. Steve Zakuani managed to score a late 85th-minute goal, but it was too little too late as the Galaxy would defeat the Sounders 3–1 on aggregate.

== Match results ==
Win Tie Loss

=== Preseason ===
February 11, 2010	Seattle Sounders FC	3–2	Vancouver Whitecaps	Casa Grande, Arizona
10:30 PDT	Neagle 49'; Nyassi 50' 88'	Report	Stewart 36'; Toure 39'; Akwari (yellow card) 65'	Attendance: 60

February 24, 2010	Seattle Sounders FC	1–3	FC Midtjylland	Murcia, Spain
70 minute game	Zakuani 50'	Report	Nworuh 45' 54' 58'	Stadium: La Manga Stadium

March 6, 2010	Vancouver Whitecaps	0–0	Seattle Sounders FC	Burnaby, Canada
16:00 PDT	Stewart (yellow card) 9'; Hirano (yellow card) 60'	Report		Stadium: Swangard Stadium; Attendance: 3,895

March 12, 2010	Sounders FC Reserves	4–0	Seattle University	Seattle, Washington
	Levesque 5' 19'; Fucito 15'; Ianni 50'	Report		Stadium: Qwest Field

==== La Manga Cup ====
February 18, 2010	Rosenborg BK	3–0	Seattle Sounders FC	Murcia, Spain
18:00 UTC	Moldskred 2'; Skjelbred 18'; Moldskred (yellow card) 24'; Prica 66'	Report	Ianni (yellow card) 51'	Stadium: La Manga Stadium

February 21, 2010	Seattle Sounders FC	2–0	Stabæk Fotball	Murcia, Spain
6:00 PT	Montero 30'; Levesque 42'; Riley (yellow card) 49'	Report		Stadium: La Manga Stadium

February 25, 2010	Seattle Sounders FC	1–0	SK Brann	Murcia, Spain
	Vagenas (yellow card) 81'; Neagle 84'	Report	Sævarsson (yellow card) 26'; Austin (yellow card) 70'	Stadium: La Manga Stadium

==== Seattle Sounders FC Community Shield ====
March 11, 2010	Seattle Sounders FC	0–1	Portland Timbers	Seattle, Washington
18:00 PDT		Report	Obatola 44'; Marcelin (yellow card) 70'	Stadium: Qwest Field; Attendance: 18,606; Referee: Elias Bazakos

=== MLS regular season ===
March 25, 2010	Seattle Sounders FC	2–0	Philadelphia Union	Seattle
18:55 PDT	Evans 12'; Montero 43'	Report	Califf (yellow card) 1'; Ståhl (yellow card) 22' (yellow-red card) 39'; Myrie (yellow card) 63'; Moreno (yellow card) 86'	Stadium: Qwest Field; Attendance: 36,241; Referee: Ricardo Salazar

April 3, 2010	Seattle Sounders FC	0–1	New York Red Bulls	Seattle
19:30 PDT	Ljungberg (yellow card) 10'; Riley (yellow card) 63'	Report	Petke (yellow card) 35'; Kandji 21'; Kandji (yellow card) 62'	Stadium: Qwest Field; Attendance: 36,066; Referee: Kevin Stott

April 10, 2010	Real Salt Lake	2–2	Seattle Sounders FC	Sandy, Utah
17:00 MDT	Johnson 53'; Wingert (yellow card) 59'; Saborio 94+'	Report	Zakuani 11'; Marshall (yellow card) 56' (goal) 72'	Stadium: Rio Tinto Stadium; Attendance: 19,970; Referee: Abbey Okulaja

April 17, 2010	Seattle Sounders FC	1–0	Kansas City Wizards	Seattle
12:00 PDT	Riley (yellow card) 29'; Zakuani (yellow card) 37'; Fucito 92'	Report	Auvray (yellow card) 72'	Stadium: Qwest Field; Attendance: 35,924; Referee: Jair Marrufo

April 22, 2010	FC Dallas	2–2	Seattle Sounders FC	Frisco, Texas
17:00 PDT	John (yellow card) 7'; Cunningham 27' (pen.) 94+' (pen.)	Report	Marshall (yellow card) 21'; Zakuani 37'; Montero (yellow card) 44' (goal) 55'	Stadium: Pizza Hut Park; Attendance: 8,512; Referee: Terry Vaughn

April 25, 2010	Toronto FC	2–0	Seattle Sounders FC	Toronto, Canada
11:00 PDT	Šarić (yellow card) 14'; Usanov (yellow card) 17'; Cann (yellow card) 52'; De Rosario 58'; White 75'	Report	Nyassi (yellow card) 41'	Stadium: BMO Field; Attendance: 18,394; Referee: Jorge Gonzalez

May 1, 2010	Seattle Sounders FC	1–1	Columbus Crew	Seattle
19:30 PDT	Zakuani 4'	Report	O'Rourke (yellow card) 28' (yellow-red card) 85'; Lenhart 45'; Carroll (yellow card) 59'; Schelotto (yellow card) 87'	Stadium: Qwest Field; Attendance: 36,219; Referee: Ricardo Salazar

May 8, 2010	Seattle Sounders FC	0–4	Los Angeles Galaxy	Seattle
13:00 PDT	Hurtado (yellow card) 37'; González (yellow card) 47+'; Marshall (yellow card) 62'	Report	Kirovski 22'; Gonzalez 52'; Dunivant 57'; Bowen (yellow card) 64'; Donovan 67'	Stadium: Qwest Field; Attendance: 36,273; Referee: Kevin Stott

May 15, 2010	New York Red Bulls	0–1	Seattle Sounders FC	Harrison, New Jersey
16:30 PDT	Hall (yellow card) 35'; Borman (yellow card) 39'; Stammler (yellow card) 71'	Report	Marshall (yellow card) 71'; Montero 85'; Zakuani (yellow card) 93+'	Stadium: Red Bull Arena; Attendance: 17,900; Referee: Silviu Petrescu

May 22, 2010	Seattle Sounders FC	0–1	San Jose Earthquakes	Seattle, Washington
		Report	Wondolowski 11'; Johnson (yellow card) 34'; Convey (yellow card) 77'	Stadium: Qwest Field; Attendance: 35,953; Referee: Alex Prus

May 29, 2010	Colorado Rapids	1–0	Seattle Sounders FC	Commerce City, Colorado
	Mastroeni (yellow card) 47+'; Casey 63' (yellow card) 92+'; Wynne (yellow card) 71'	Report	González (yellow card) 46+'; Ianni (yellow card) 52'; Ljungberg (yellow card) 52'	Stadium: Dick's Sporting Goods Park; Attendance: 18,116

June 5, 2010	Seattle Sounders FC	3–0	New England Revolution	Seattle
19:30 PDT	González 5' (yellow card) 36'; Zakuani 24'; Montero 42'	Report	Gibbs (yellow card) 3'; Niouky (yellow card) 64'	Stadium: Qwest Field; Attendance: 36,344; Referee: Jorge Gonzalez

June 10, 2010	Seattle Sounders FC	2–3	D.C. United	Seattle
19:00 PDT	Ljungberg (yellow card) 43'; Riley 90+'; Montero 91+'	Report	Pontius (yellow card) 24' (goal) 39' 44' 79'; Najar (yellow card) 62'	Stadium: Qwest Field; Attendance: 36,146; Referee: Michael Kennedy

June 27, 2010	Philadelphia Union	3–1	Seattle Sounders FC	Chester, Pennsylvania
14:00 PDT	Le Toux 55' (pen.); Fred 79'; Mwanga 84'	Report	Ianni (yellow card) 20'; Noonan 44'	Stadium: PPL Park; Attendance: 18,755; Referee: Baldomero Toledo

July 4, 2010	Los Angeles Galaxy	3–1	Seattle Sounders FC	Carson, California
19:30 PDT	Donovan 19'; Juninho 48'; Riley 77' (o.g.); Cazumba (yellow card) 89'	Report	Zakuani 66'; Marshall (yellow card) 82'	Stadium: Home Depot Center; Attendance: 27,000; Referee: Silviu Petrescu

July 11, 2010	Seattle Sounders FC	1–1	FC Dallas	Seattle
19:30 PDT	Montero 14'; González (yellow card) 51'; Montaño (red card) 57'	Report	Ferreira (yellow card) 34' (goal) 87'; Hernandez (yellow card) 49'; Shea (yellow card) 57'; McCarty (yellow card) 76'; Pearce (yellow card) 84'	Stadium: Qwest Field; Attendance: 36,091; Referee: Kevin Stott

July 15, 2010	D.C. United	0–1	Seattle Sounders FC	Washington, D.C.
17:00 PDT	James (yellow card) 54'	Report	Levesque 89'	Stadium: RFK Memorial Stadium; Attendance: 13,716; Referee: Alex Prus

July 25, 2010	Seattle Sounders FC	2–1	Colorado Rapids	Seattle
19:30 PDT	Zakuani 8' 17'; Alonso (yellow card) 90'	Report	Cummings 9' (yellow card) 29'; Smith (yellow card) 58'	Stadium: Qwest Field; Attendance: 36,333; Referee: Yader Reyes

July 31, 2010	San Jose Earthquakes	0–1	Seattle Sounders FC	Santa Clara, California
19:00 PDT	Cronin (yellow card) 15'; Corrales (yellow card) 80'	Report	Montero 26'; Alonso (yellow card) 90+'	Stadium: Buck Shaw Stadium; Attendance: 10,351; Referee: Edvin Jurisevic

August 8, 2010	Seattle Sounders FC	2–0	Houston Dynamo	Seattle, Washington
20:00 PDT	Nyassi (yellow card) 28'; Riley (yellow card) 32'; Nkufo (yellow card) 50'; Montero 64'; Sturgis (yellow card) 70'; Fernández 88'	Report	Chabala (yellow card) 59'; Mullan (yellow card) 59'	Stadium: Qwest Field; Attendance: 36,111; Referee: Michael Kennedy

August 14, 2010	Chivas USA	0–0	Seattle Sounders FC	Carson, California
20:00 PDT	Trujillo (red card) 91+'	Report	Parke (yellow card) 89'; González (red card) 91+'	Stadium: The Home Depot Center; Attendance: 13,839; Referee: Alex Prus

August 28, 2010	Seattle Sounders FC	2–1	Chicago Fire	Seattle, Washington
19:30 PDT	Montero (yellow card) 24' (goal) 36' 90+1'; Nkufo (yellow card) 43'; Jaqua (yellow card) 90'	Report	Kinney (yellow card) 22'; Thorrington 28' (pen.); Ljungberg (yellow card) 83'	Stadium: Qwest Field; Attendance: 36,386; Referee: Ramon Hernandez

September 4, 2010	New England Revolution	3–1	Seattle Sounders FC	Foxborough, Massachusetts
16:30 PDT	Tierney 70'; Perović 73' (yellow card) 84'; Dube 81'	Report	Zakuani 59'; Montero (yellow card) 66'; Riley (yellow card) 71'	Stadium: Gillette Stadium; Attendance: 13,124; Referee: Silviu Petrescu

September 9, 2010	Seattle Sounders FC	0–0	Real Salt Lake	Seattle, Washington
16:30 PDT		report	Saborio (yellow card) 54'	Stadium: Qwest Field; Attendance: 36,078; Referee: Paul Ward

September 18, 2010	Columbus Crew	0–4	Seattle Sounders FC	Columbus, Ohio
16:30 PDT		Report	Nkufo 4' 39' 75'; Sturgis 42' (pen.); Scott (yellow card) 77'; Parke (yellow card) 89'	Stadium: Columbus Crew Stadium; Attendance: 17,144; Referee: Jair Marrufo

September 25, 2010	Chicago Fire	0–1	Seattle Sounders FC	Bridgeview, Illinois
7:00PM CDT	Thorrington (yellow card) 27'; Pappa (yellow card) 69'	Report	Nkufo 89'	Stadium: Toyota Park; Attendance: 17,477; Referee: Jason Anno

October 2, 2010	Seattle Sounders FC	3–2	Toronto FC	Seattle, Washington
12:30 PDT	Zakuani 21'; Nkufo 26'; Nyassi 59'	Report	DeRosario 16'; Barrett (yellow card) 25' (goal) 88'; Gargan (yellow card) 33'	Stadium: Qwest Field; Attendance: 36,079; Referee: Mark Geiger

October 9, 2010	Kansas City Wizards	1–2	Seattle Sounders FC	Kansas City, Kansas
	Bunbury (yellow card) 63'; Arnaud (yellow card) 81' (goal) 84' (pen.)	Report	Alonso (yellow card) 28'; Montero (yellow card) 60'; Nyassi 66'; Fernández 78'; Jaqua (yellow card) 81'	Stadium: CommunityAmerica Ballpark; Attendance: 11,522; Referee: Kevin Stott

October 15, 2010	Seattle Sounders FC	2–1	Chivas USA	Seattle, Washington
20:00 PDT	Zakuani 9'; Alonso 25'; Zakuani (yellow card) 59'; Montero (yellow card) 84'	Report	Nagamura (yellow card) 26'; Padilla 90'	Stadium: Qwest Field; Attendance: 36,356; Referee: Edvin Jurisevic

October 23, 2010	Houston Dynamo	2–1	Seattle Sounders FC	Houston, Texas
	Cameron 27'; Weaver (yellow card) 33'; Weaver 46'	Report	Riley 11'; Parke (yellow card) 28'; Zakuani (yellow card) 35'; González (yellow card) 41'	Stadium: Robertson Stadium; Attendance: 23,990; Referee: Kevin Stott

=== MLS Playoffs ===
October 31, 2010 Conf. Semifinals	Seattle Sounders FC	0–1	Los Angeles Galaxy	Seattle
17:00 PDT	Montero (yellow card) 49'; Nkufo (yellow card) 93'	Report	Buddle 38'; Juninho (yellow card) 48'; Kovalenko (yellow card) 65'; Kirovski (yellow card) 82'	Stadium: Qwest Field; Attendance: 35,521; Referee: Ricardo Salazar

November 7, 2010 Conf. Semifinals	Los Angeles Galaxy	2–1 (3–1 agg.)	Seattle Sounders FC	Carson, California
18:00 PDT	Beckham (yellow card) 8'; Buddle 19'; Gonzalez 27'	Report	Ianni (yellow card) 65'; Zakuani 86'	Stadium: Home Depot Center; Attendance: 27,000; Referee: Baldomero Toledo

=== U.S. Open Cup ===
June 30, 2010 Third round	Portland Timbers	1–1 (a.e.t.) (3–4 p)	Seattle Sounders FC	Portland, Oregon
7:30 PM PDT	Suzuki (yellow card) 23'; Dike 37'; Thompson (yellow card) 39'	Report	Jaqua 13'; Riley (yellow card) 23'; Graham (yellow card) 43' (yellow-red card) 101'; Nyassi (yellow card) 58'	Stadium: PGE Park; Attendance: 15,422; Referee: Ronald Lagraff
	Penalties
	Pore (penalty missed); DeMartin (penalty scored); Danso (penalty scored); Smith (penalty missed); Lopez (penalty scored)		(penalty scored) Sturgis; (penalty scored) Zakuani; (penalty scored) Montero; (penalty missed) Ianni; (penalty scored) Scott

July 7, 2010 Quarterfinals	Seattle Sounders FC	2–0	Los Angeles Galaxy	Tukwila, Washington
7:30 PM PDT	Jaqua 50' 62'; Estrada (yellow card) 89'	Report	Cazumba (yellow card) 45'; Jordan (yellow card) 70'; Gordon (yellow card) 89'	Stadium: Starfire Sports Complex; Attendance: 4,512; Referee: Jair Marrufo

September 1, 2010 Semifinals	Seattle Sounders FC	3–1	Chivas USA	Tukwila, Washington
7:30 PM PDT	Jaqua 10' 92+'; Montero 59'; Alonso (yellow card) 79'	Report	Nagamura (yellow card) 51'; Padilla 66'	Stadium: Starfire Sports Complex; Attendance: 4,547; Referee: Ricardo Salazar

October 5, 2010 Final	Seattle Sounders FC	2–1	Columbus Crew	Seattle, Washington
19:00 PM PDT	Riley (yellow card) 23'; Nyassi 38' 66' (yellow card) 76'; Alonso (yellow card) 72'	Report	Burns 24'; Francis (yellow card) 28'; Carroll (yellow card) 41'; Schelotto (yellow card) 87'	Stadium: Qwest Field; Attendance: 31,311; Referee: Michael Kennedy

=== CONCACAF Champions League ===
==== Preliminary round ====
Seattle earned a preliminary round spot in the 2010–11 edition of the CONCACAF Champions League by winning the 2009 U.S. Open Cup over D.C. United. It was the first time in club's history or in any previous Seattle Sounders franchise, that they entered an international competition such as the Champions League. The draw for the preliminary round took place on May 19, 2010, at the CONCACAF headquarters in New York City. Seattle was paired against Isidro Metapán, a Salvadoran club that won the 2010 Salvadoran Clausura.

The two sides met in Seattle on July 28, 2010. The Sounders set another attendance record of 17,688; which became the highest crowd to watch a preliminary round draw in the Champions League, the number also remained the highest crowd an MLS-side drew for Champions League play for a month. There, a 60th-minute goal from Freddy Montero gave the Sounders a 1–0 win and a goal advantage on aggregate going down to Metapán, El Salvador. The second leg of Champions League action saw the Sounders go down 1–0 to Metapán in the match, and level on aggregate, due to an 18th-minute opener from retired Panamanian international Anel Canales. Recently acquired Álvaro Fernández tied the game in the 74th minute, to level the match at one, and to give the Sounders a 2–1 lead on aggregate. Ultimately, the Sounders would win the match and secure a group stage spot in Champions League play.

Series Results

July 28, 2010 First leg	Seattle Sounders FC (United States)	1–0	(El Salvador) Isidro Metapán	Seattle, Washington
19:00 PDT	Vagenas (yellow card) 8'; Vegenas (substituted off) Alonso (substituted on) 14'; Riley (yellow card) 17'; Alonso (yellow card) 19'; Montano (substituted off) Zakuani (substituted on) 57'; Jaqua (substituted off) Montero (substituted on) 60'; Montero 60'; Nyassi (yellow card) 67'	Report	(yellow card) 36' Alvarado; (yellow card) 42' Prado; (yellow card) 65' Umana; (substituted off) 69' Menéndez (substituted on) Blanco; (substituted off) 80' Suárez (substituted on) A. Flores; (substituted off) 87' J. Flores (substituted on) Morán	Stadium: Qwest Field; Attendance: 17,228; Referee: Ricardo Arellano

August 3, 2010 Second leg	Isidro Metapán (El Salvador)	1–1 (1–2 agg.)	(United States) Seattle Sounders FC	San Salvador, El Salvador
18:00 PDT	Canales 18'; Aquino (yellow card) 26'; Blanco (yellow card) 90'	Report	(yellow card) 22' Nyassi; 74' Fernández; (yellow card) 75' Levesque	Stadium: Estadio Cuscatlán; Referee: Jose Pineda (Honduras)

==== Group stage ====
Along with Honduras's Marathón, Seattle was placed into Group C along with 2009 Mexico Apertura champions, Monterrey and 2010 Costa Rican Verano champions Saprissa. On August 19, 2010, the Sounders opened up Group stage against Marathón at Estadio Rosenthal in San Pedro Sula. There, the Sounders opened up the score sheet with a 17th-minute goal from Roger Levesque. In spite of the early goal, the Sounders could not hold the lead and relinquished it late in the first half, when Marathón's Orvin Paz leveled the game ten minutes later. In first-half injury time, Marathón took the lead with a converted penalty kick from Nicolas Cardozo. The goal ultimately led to the 2–1 victory for the Verdolagas.

Chances to earn a quarterfinal berth became slim for the Sounders as they dropped their next two consecutive games, a 2–0 loss at home to Monterrey and an away loss to Saprissa by the same margin. With an 0-3-0 record, the Sounders stood in last place in their group and had the weakest record of all group stage clubs in the Champions League. Needing a win to keep their knockout stage hopes alive, the Sounders would have to travel south to Estadio Tecnológico in Mexico to take on red-hot Monterrey. After Real Salt Lake lost at Cruz Azul 5–4, and Columbus Crew lost 1–0 at Santos Laguna, the Sounders were the last hope for an American team to have a win in Mexico in a meaningful competition. For a while, it seemed like they would accomplish the feat. An own goal from Monterrey's Sergio Pérez gave the Sounders an unlikely lead over the Rayados. The Sounders built upon that lead when Michael Fucito doubled it in the 44th minute, giving the Sounders 2–0 advantage at halftime. However, a pair of quick goals from Mexican international Aldo de Nigris and Chilean-international Humberto Suazo leveled the game at two apiece. Perez avenged his own goal minutes following the stalemate with a converted penalty kick in the 75th minute of play. The game ended in a 3–2 defeat, which ultimately led to the Sounders FC being eliminated from quarterfinal contention. The win gave Monterrey a guaranteed first-place finish in Group C.

As a result of being knocked out the championship round in the Champions League, the Sounders began to emphasize more on the U.S. Open Cup final against Columbus and their push for the playoffs. Because of this, the Sounders fielded a primarily second-tier squad in their final two games, both at home against Marathón and Saprissa, respectively. Fucito, who scored against Monterrey on September 22, scored both of Seattle's goals in their 2–0 triumph over visiting Marathon. Seattle would conclude their Champions League campaign by hosting Saprissa on October 19. Nate Jaqua opened the scoring for the Sounders, but just as they opened Group stage, they would relinquish their lead, falling 2–1 to Saprissa.

Match results

August 19, 2010 1	Marathón (Honduras)	2–1	(United States) Seattle Sounders FC	San Pedro Sula, Honduras
22:00	Paz 27'; Cardozo 45+1' (pen.); Barrios (yellow card) 50'	Report	Levesque 17'; Marshall (yellow card) 44'; Gonzalez (yellow card) 63'	Stadium: Estadio Yankel Rosenthal; Attendance: 1,990; Referee: Juan Carlos Guerra

August 25, 2010 2	Seattle Sounders FC (United States)	0–2	(Mexico) Monterrey	Seattle
19:00	Jaqua (yellow card) 52'	Report	Zavala (yellow card) 32'; Cardozo (yellow card) 36'; Cardozo 41' de Nigris 58'	Stadium: Qwest Field; Attendance: 22,513; Referee: Joel Aguilar (El Salvador)

September 14, 2010 3	Saprissa (Costa Rica)	2–0	(United States) Seattle Sounders FC	San José, Costa Rica
20:00 PDT (8:00 PM)	Guzmán 56'; Alemán 81'; Centeno (yellow card) 86'	Report	(red card) 38' González; (yellow card) 43' Levesque; (yellow card) 53' Boss; (yellow card) 86' Fernández; (yellow card) 90' Wahl	Stadium: Estadio Ricardo Saprissa Aymá; Attendance: 3,000; Referee: Marco Antonio Rodríguez (Mexico)

September 22, 2010 4	Monterrey (Mexico)	3–2	(United States) Seattle Sounders FC	Monterrey, Mexico
20:00	Cardozo (yellow card) 68'; De Nigris 72'; Suazo 73'; Pérez 75' (pen.); Arellano (yellow card) 43' (yellow-red card) 90'	Report	Pérez 27' (o.g.); Scott (yellow card) 35'; Fucito 44'; Seamon (yellow card) 53'	Stadium: Estadio Tecnológico; Attendance: 19,697; Referee: Marlon Alfonso Mejia

September 29, 2010 5	Seattle Sounders FC (United States)	2–0	(Honduras) Marathón	Seattle
19:00 PDT (7:00 PM)	Fucito 20' 68'	Report		Stadium: Qwest Field; Attendance: 11,768; Referee: Paul Ward (Canada)

October 19, 2010 6	Seattle Sounders FC (United States)	1–2	(Costa Rica) Saprissa	Seattle
22:00	Jaqua 17' (yellow card) 80'; Fernández (yellow card) 48'; Montaño (yellow card) 70'	Report	Arrieta 26'; Mena (yellow card) 33'; Badilla (yellow card) 52'; Martínez 89'; Robinson (yellow card) 63' (yellow-red card) 89'; Blanco (yellow card) 90'	Stadium: Qwest Field; Attendance: 11,434; Referee: Neal Brizan (Trinidad and Tobago)

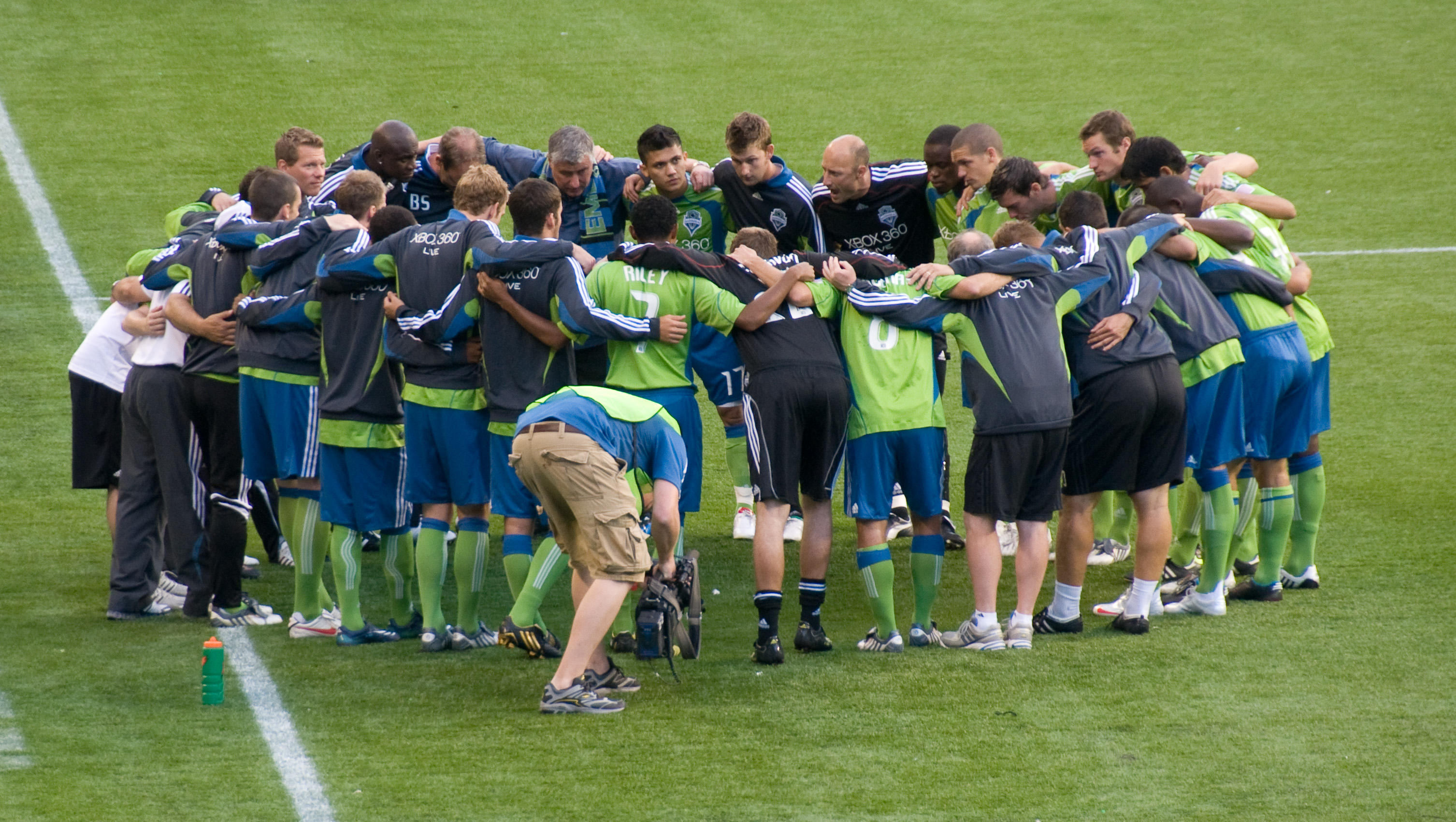
Sounders FC players and coaches huddle before a Champions League home fixture against Monterrey.

Team	Pld	W	D	L	GF	GA	GD	Pts
(Mexico) Monterrey	6	5	1	0	11	4	+7	16
(Costa Rica) Saprissa	6	3	1	2	11	7	+4	10
(Honduras) Marathón	6	2	0	4	5	11	−6	6
(United States) Seattle Sounders FC	6	1	0	5	6	11	−5	3

	MAR	MON	SAP	SEA
Marathón	–	0–1	2–1	2–1
Monterrey	2–0	–	1–0	3–2
Saprissa	4–1	2–2	–	2–0
Seattle Sounders FC	2–0	0–2	1–2	–

Last updated: 16 December 2010.
Source: UEFA Europa League 2010-11 match reports

Results summary

Overall								Home						Away					
Pld	Pts	W	L	T	GF	GA	GD	W	L	T	GF	GA	GD	W	L	T	GF	GA	GD
6	3	1	5	0	6	11	−5	1	2	0	3	4	−1	0	3	0	3	7	−4

Last updated: November 16, 2010
Source: CONCACAF
Pld = Matches played; Pts = Points; W = Matches won; T = Matches tied; L = Matches lost; GF = Goals for; GA = Goals against; GD = Goal difference

Round	1	2	3	4	5	6
Stadium	A	H	A	A	H	H
Result	L	L	L	L	W	L
Position	3	4	4	4	4	4

Updated to match(es) played on November 17, 2010. Source: MLS Results and League table
A = Away; H = Home; W = Win; L = Loss; T = Tie

=== Friendlies ===
May 26, 2010	Seattle Sounders FC (United States)	3–0	(Argentina) Boca Juniors	Seattle, Washington
	Levesque 42'; Noonan 65'; Seamon 75'; Ianni (yellow card) 83'	Report	Erbes (yellow card) 41'	Stadium: Qwest Field; Attendance: 40,122; Referee: Edvin Jurisevic

July 18, 2010	Seattle Sounders FC (United States)	1–2	(Scotland) Celtic	Seattle, Washington
	Boss (red card) 29'; Estrada 66'	Report	Samaras 33' (pen.); McCourt 64'; Mulgrew (yellow card) 84'	Stadium: Qwest Field; Attendance: 45,631; Referee: Paul Ward

October 12, 2010	Seattle Sounders FC (United States)	3–1	(Mexico) C.D. Guadalajara	Seattle, Washington
	Fucito 5' (yellow card) 16'; Jaqua 18'; Nyassi 90'	Report	Adams (yellow card) 56'; Oviedo (yellow card) 63'; Ocampo (yellow card) 67' (yellow-red card) 77'; Fabián 70'	Stadium: Qwest Field; Attendance: 41,047; Referee: Terry Vaughn

== League table ==
Conference

Pos	Team	Pld	W	L	T	GF	GA	GD	Pts	Qualification
1	LA Galaxy	30	18	7	5	44	26	+18	59	Qualification for the conference semifinals
2	Real Salt Lake	30	15	4	11	45	20	+25	56	Qualification for the conference semifinals
3	FC Dallas	30	12	4	14	42	28	+14	50	Qualification for the conference semifinals
4	Seattle Sounders FC	30	14	10	6	39	35	+4	48	Qualification for the conference semifinals
5	Colorado Rapids	30	12	8	10	44	32	+12	46	Qualification for the conference semifinals
6	San Jose Earthquakes	30	13	10	7	34	33	+1	46	Qualification for the conference semifinals
7	Houston Dynamo	30	9	15	6	40	49	−9	33	
8	Chivas USA	30	8	18	4	31	45	−14	28	

Source: MLS

Overall

Pos	Team	Pld	W	L	T	GF	GA	GD	Pts	
1	LA Galaxy (S)	30	18	7	5	44	26	+18	59	Qualification for the CONCACAF Champions League
2	Real Salt Lake	30	15	4	11	45	20	+25	56	
3	New York Red Bulls	30	15	9	6	38	29	+9	51	
4	FC Dallas	30	12	4	14	42	28	+14	50	Qualification for the CONCACAF Champions League
5	Columbus Crew	30	14	8	8	40	34	+6	50	
6	Seattle Sounders FC (U)	30	14	10	6	39	35	+4	48	Qualification for the CONCACAF Champions League
7	Colorado Rapids (C)	30	12	8	10	44	32	+12	46	Qualification for the CONCACAF Champions League
8	San Jose Earthquakes	30	13	10	7	34	33	+1	46	
9	Kansas City Wizards	30	11	13	6	36	35	+1	39	
10	Chicago Fire	30	9	12	9	37	38	−1	36	
11	Toronto FC (V)	30	9	13	8	33	41	−8	35	Qualification for the CONCACAF Champions League
12	Houston Dynamo	30	9	15	6	40	49	−9	33	
13	New England Revolution	30	9	16	5	32	50	−18	32	
14	Philadelphia Union	30	8	15	7	35	49	−14	31	
15	Chivas USA	30	8	18	4	31	45	−14	28	
16	D.C. United	30	6	20	4	21	47	−26	22	

Source: MLS
Rules for classification: 1) points; 2) head-to-head record; 3) goal difference; 4) number of goals scored
(C) MLS Cup champions; (S) Supporters' Shield winners; (U) U.S. Open Cup winners; (V) Canadian Championship winners

=== Results summary ===
Overall								Home						Away					
Pld	Pts	W	L	T	GF	GA	GD	W	L	T	GF	GA	GD	W	L	T	GF	GA	GD
30	48	14	10	6	39	35	+4	8	4	3	21	16	+5	6	6	3	18	19	−1

Last updated: October 23, 2010
Source: Major League Soccer
Pld = Matches played; Pts = Points; W = Matches won; T = Matches tied; L = Matches lost; GF = Goals for; GA = Goals against; GD = Goal difference

Round	1	2	3	4	5	6	7	8	9	10	11	12	13	14	15	16	17	18	19	20	21	22	23	24	25	26	27	28	29	30
Stadium	H	H	A	H	A	A	H	H	A	H	A	H	H	A	A	H	A	H	A	H	A	H	A	H	A	A	H	A	H	A
Result	W	L	T	W	T	L	T	L	W	L	L	W	L	L	L	T	W	W	W	W	T	W	L	T	W	W	W	W	W	L
Conference	2	5	4	4	2	3	4	8	6	6	7	7	7	7	7	7	7	6	4	4	4	4	6	6	6	5	4	4	4	4
Overall	4	9	7	5	3	4	5	11	8	9	10	10	10	10	11	11	10	9	6	6	6	6	8	8	8	7	6	6	5	5

Updated to match(es) played on October 23, 2010. Source: MLS Results and League table
A = Away; H = Home; W = Win; L = Loss; T = Tie

== Squad ==
As of February 23, 2010. Note: Flags indicate national team as defined under FIFA eligibility rules; some limited exceptions apply. Players may hold more than one non-FIFA nationality.

No.	Pos.	Nation	Player
2	MF	USA	Mike Fucito
3	MF	USA	Brad Evans
4	DF	USA	Patrick Ianni
5	DF	USA	Tyson Wahl
6	MF	CUB	Osvaldo Alonso
7	DF	USA	James Riley
8	MF	USA	Peter Vagenas (Injured Reserve)
9	FW	SUI	Blaise Nkufo
11	MF	COD	Steve Zakuani
12	DF	USA	Nathan Sturgis
14	DF	JAM	Tyrone Marshall
15	MF	URU	Álvaro Fernández
16	FW	USA	David Estrada
17	FW	COL	Fredy Montero

No.	Pos.	Nation	Player
18	GK	USA	Kasey Keller (captain)
19	DF	CRC	Leonardo González
20	DF	USA	Zach Scott
21	FW	USA	Nate Jaqua
22	FW	USA	Mike Seamon
23	MF	GAM	Sanna Nyassi
24	FW	USA	Roger Levesque
25	FW	USA	Pat Noonan (Injured Reserve)
26	DF	PUR	Taylor Graham
28	GK	PUR	Terry Boss
31	DF	USA	Jeff Parke
32	MF	COL	Miguel Montaño
34	DF	COL	Jhon Kennedy Hurtado (Injured Reserve)

=== Transfers ===
==== In ====
Note: Flags indicate national team as defined under FIFA eligibility rules; some limited exceptions apply. Players may hold more than one non-FIFA nationality.

No.	Pos.	Nation	Player
9	FW	SUI	Blaise Nkufo (Free)
15	MF	URU	Álvaro Fernández
16	FW	USA	David Estrada (MLS SuperDraft)

No.	Pos.	Nation	Player
22	MF	USA	Mike Seamon (MLS SuperDraft)
25	FW	USA	Pat Noonan (Free)
32	FW	COL	Miguel Montaño (Free)

==== Out ====
Note: Flags indicate national team as defined under FIFA eligibility rules; some limited exceptions apply. Players may hold more than one non-FIFA nationality.

No.	Pos.	Nation	Player
1	GK	USA	Chris Eylander (Released on waivers)
9	FW	FRA	Sébastien Le Toux (to Philadelphia Union, Expansion Draft)
10	MF	SWE	Freddie Ljungberg (Trade to Chicago Fire)
15	MF	USA	Stephen King (Trade to D.C. United)

No.	Pos.	Nation	Player
16	DF	USA	Evan Brown (Released on waivers)
27	MF	USA	Lamar Neagle (Released on waivers)
29	MF	USA	Jamel Wallace (Released)

- Player joined his new club on July 15, 2010.

=== Coaching staff ===
As of April 24, 2010.

Position	Name	Nationality
Manager	Sigi Schmid	German
Assistant coach	Brian Schmetzer	American
Assistant coach	Ezra Hendrickson	Vincentian
Goalkeeping coach	Tom Dutra	American
Fitness coach	David Tenney	American
Chief scout	Kurt Schmid	American
Technical director	Chris Henderson	American

== Statistics ==
=== Appearances and goals ===
Last updated on 25 August 2016.

No.	Pos	Nat	Player	Total		Regular season		Playoffs		U.S. Open Cup		Champions League	
No.	Pos	Nat	Player	Apps	Goals	Apps	Goals	Apps	Goals	Apps	Goals	Apps	Goals
2	MF	(United States) USA	Mike Fucito	9	4	0+4	1	0+1	0	0	0	3+1	3
3	MF	(United States) USA	Brad Evans	12	1	11+1	1	0	0	0	0	0	0
4	DF	(United States) USA	Patrick Ianni	32	0	24+1	0	2	0	2+1	0	2	0
5	DF	(United States) USA	Tyson Wahl	11	0	2+2	0	0	0	3	0	3+1	0
6	MF	(Cuba) CUB	Osvaldo Alonso	32	1	21+2	1	2	0	2	0	4+1	0
7	DF	(United States) USA	James Riley	37	1	27	1	2	0	3+1	0	4	0
8	MF	(United States) USA	Peter Vagenas	10	0	7	0	0	0	0	0	2+1	0
9	FW	(Switzerland) SUI	Blaise Nkufo	16	5	11	5	2	0	1	0	2	0
11	MF	(Democratic Republic of the Congo) COD	Steve Zakuani	37	11	27+2	10	2	1	2+1	0	2+1	0
12	MF	(United States) USA	Nathan Sturgis	31	1	16+4	1	2	0	4	0	4+1	0
14	DF	(Jamaica) JAM	Tyrone Marshall	30	1	14+6	1	1+1	0	1	0	7	0
15	MF	(Uruguay) URU	Álvaro Fernández	23	3	4+8	2	0+2	0	1+1	0	5+2	1
16	FW	(United States) USA	David Estrada	8	0	1+2	0	0	0	0+1	0	2+2	0
17	FW	(Colombia) COL	Fredy Montero	40	12	27+2	10	2	0	2+1	1	4+2	1
18	GK	(United States) USA	Kasey Keller	38	0	30	0	2	0	3	0	3	0
19	DF	(Costa Rica) CRC	Leonardo González	37	1	27	1	2	0	1+1	0	5+1	0
20	DF	(United States) USA	Zach Scott	10	0	4	0	0	0	2	0	4	0
21	FW	(United States) USA	Nate Jaqua	26	6	3+12	0	0+1	0	3+1	5	3+3	1
22	MF	(United States) USA	Mike Seamon	18	0	3+5	0	0	0	2+1	0	4+3	0
23	MF	(The Gambia) GAM	Sanna Nyassi	36	4	14+10	2	2	0	3	2	4+3	0
24	FW	(United States) USA	Roger Levesque	27	2	5+11	1	0	0	2+2	0	6+1	1
25	FW	(United States) USA	Pat Noonan	12	1	8+4	1	0	0	0	0	0	0
26	DF	(Puerto Rico) PUR	Taylor Graham	8	0	0+1	0	0	0	2	0	5	0
28	GK	(Puerto Rico) PUR	Terry Boss	5	0	0+1	0	0	0	1	0	3	0
31	DF	(United States) USA	Jeff Parke	26	0	20	0	1	0	2+1	0	2	0
32	MF	(Colombia) COL	Miguel Montaño	12	0	1+5	0	0	0	2	0	3+1	0
34	DF	(Colombia) COL	Jhon Kennedy Hurtado	9	0	9	0	0	0	0	0	0	0
Players who left the club during the season:
10	MF	(Sweden) SWE	Freddie Ljungberg	15	0	14+1	0	0	0	0	0	0	0
15	MF	(United States) USA	Stephen King	0	0	0	0	0	0	0	0	0	0

== Recognition ==
MLS Save of the Year

Player	Opponent	Link
(United States) Kasey Keller	Kansas City Wizards	Save Week 4

MLS Player of the Month

Month	Player	Link
July	(Colombia) Fredy Montero	Player of the Month

MLS Player of the Week

Week	Player	Opponent	Link
17	(Democratic Republic of the Congo) Steve Zakuani	Colorado Rapids	Player of the Week
22	(Colombia) Fredy Montero	Chicago Fire	Player of the Week
25	(Switzerland) Blaise Nkufo	Columbus Crew	Player of the Week
29	(Democratic Republic of the Congo) Steve Zakuani	Chivas USA	Player of the Week

MLS Goal of the Week

Week	Player	Opponent	Link
5	(Colombia) Fredy Montero	FC Dallas	Goal Week 5
11	(Costa Rica) Leonardo González	New England Revolution	Goal Week 11
16	(United States) Roger Levesque	D.C. United	Goal Week 16
19	(Colombia) Fredy Montero	Houston Dynamo	Goal Week 19
25	(Switzerland) Blaise Nkufo	Columbus Crew	
27	(Democratic Republic of the Congo) Steve Zakuani	Toronto FC	Goal Week 27
28	(Uruguay) Álvaro Fernández	Kansas City Wizards	Goal Week 28
29	(Democratic Republic of the Congo) Steve Zakuani	Chivas USA	Goal Week 29
30	(United States) James Riley	Houston Dynamo	Goal Week 30

NAPA Save of the Week

Week	Player	Opponent	Link
17	(United States) Kasey Keller	Colorado Rapids	Save of the Week
24	(United States) Kasey Keller	Real Salt Lake	Save of the Week
25	(United States) Kasey Keller	Columbus Crew	Save of the Week
26	(United States) Kasey Keller	Chicago Fire	Save of the Week

MLS W.O.R.K.S. Humanitarian of the Month

Month	Player	Link
April	(The Gambia) Sanna Nyassi	April Humanitarian of the Month
October	(United States) James Riley	October Humanitarian of the Month
