= 2010 U.S. Open Cup final =

2010 final of the Lamar Hunt U.S. Open Cup

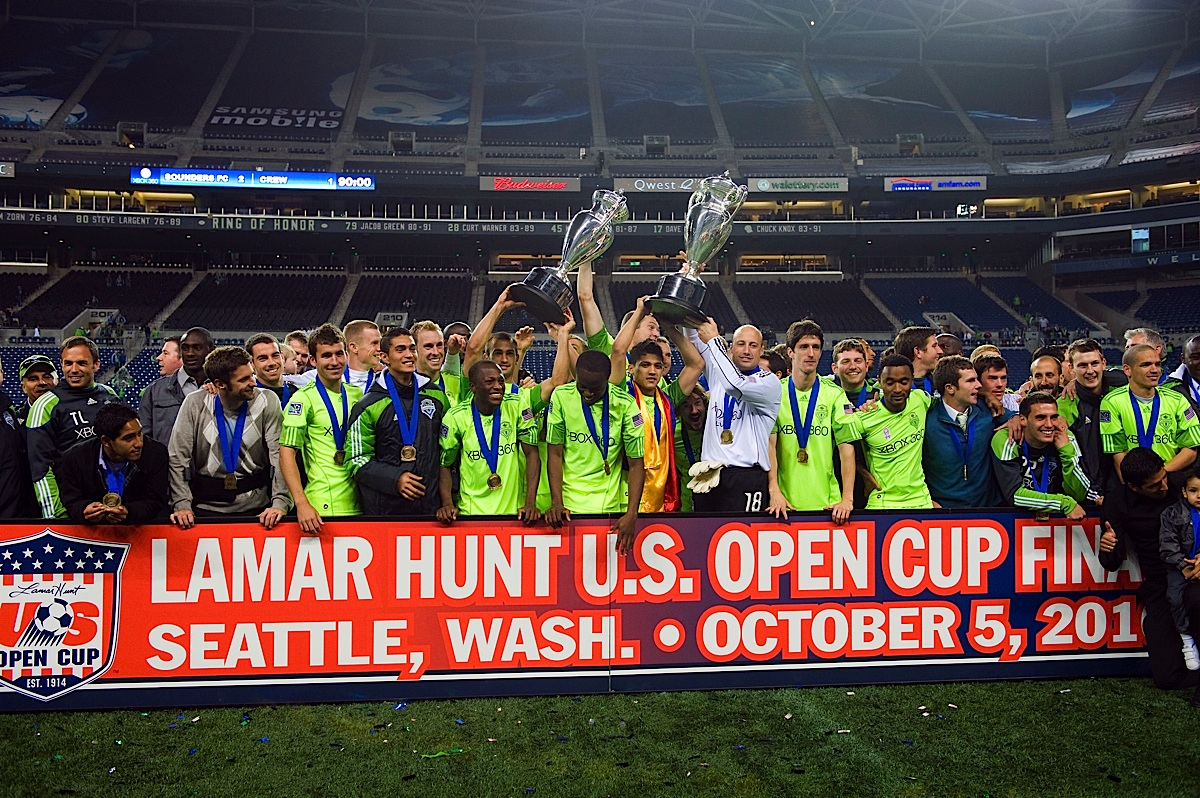
- Sounders FC players lift the 2009 and 2010 U.S. Open Cup trophies after repeating as champions by winning the 2010 final.
- Event: 2010 U.S. Open Cup
Seattle Sounders FC	Columbus Crew
MLS	MLS
2	1
- Date: October 5, 2010
- Venue: Qwest Field, Seattle
- Man of the Match: Sanna Nyassi
- Referee: Michael Kennedy
- Attendance: 31,311
- Weather: Clear, 60 °F (16 °C)

The 2010 Lamar Hunt U.S. Open Cup final was played on October 5, 2010, at Qwest Field (since renamed CenturyLink Field) in Seattle, Washington, United States. The match determined the winner of the 2010 U.S. Open Cup, a tournament open to amateur and professional soccer teams affiliated with the United States Soccer Federation. This was the 97th edition of the oldest competition in United States soccer. Seattle Sounders FC won the match, defeating the Columbus Crew 2–1 in front of a sellout crowd of 31,311, the highest attendance at a U.S. Open Cup final. Kevin Burns scored first, giving the Columbus Crew an early lead. Sanna Nyassi then scored both goals for Seattle Sounders FC as it became the first team since 1983 to win two consecutive U.S. Open Cup championships.

Both the Columbus Crew and Seattle Sounders FC qualified automatically for the third round of the U.S. Open Cup tournament by finishing among the top six in the 2009 Major League Soccer season standings. Both clubs won three matches in the tournament to advance to the final. Seattle won the bidding process to host the final.

As a result of its U.S. Open Cup championship, Sounders FC earned a berth in the preliminary round of the 2011–12 CONCACAF Champions League, as well as a $100,000 cash prize. The Crew received the runner-up prize of $50,000.

== Road to the final ==
The U.S. Open Cup is an annual American soccer competition open to all United States Soccer Federation affiliated teams, from amateur adult club teams to the professional clubs of Major League Soccer (MLS). The 2010 tournament was the 97th edition of the oldest soccer tournament in the United States.

In 2010, MLS, which has teams that play in both the United States and Canada, was allowed to enter eight of its U.S.-based teams in the tournament. The top six MLS teams from the previous season's league table qualified automatically for the tournament, while the remaining two spots were determined by preliminary qualification matches. The eight MLS entries began play in the third round of the tournament. In 2009, both Seattle Sounders FC and the Columbus Crew finished among the top six teams in MLS overall league standings and therefore qualified automatically for the third round of the 2010 U.S. Open Cup.

=== Columbus Crew ===
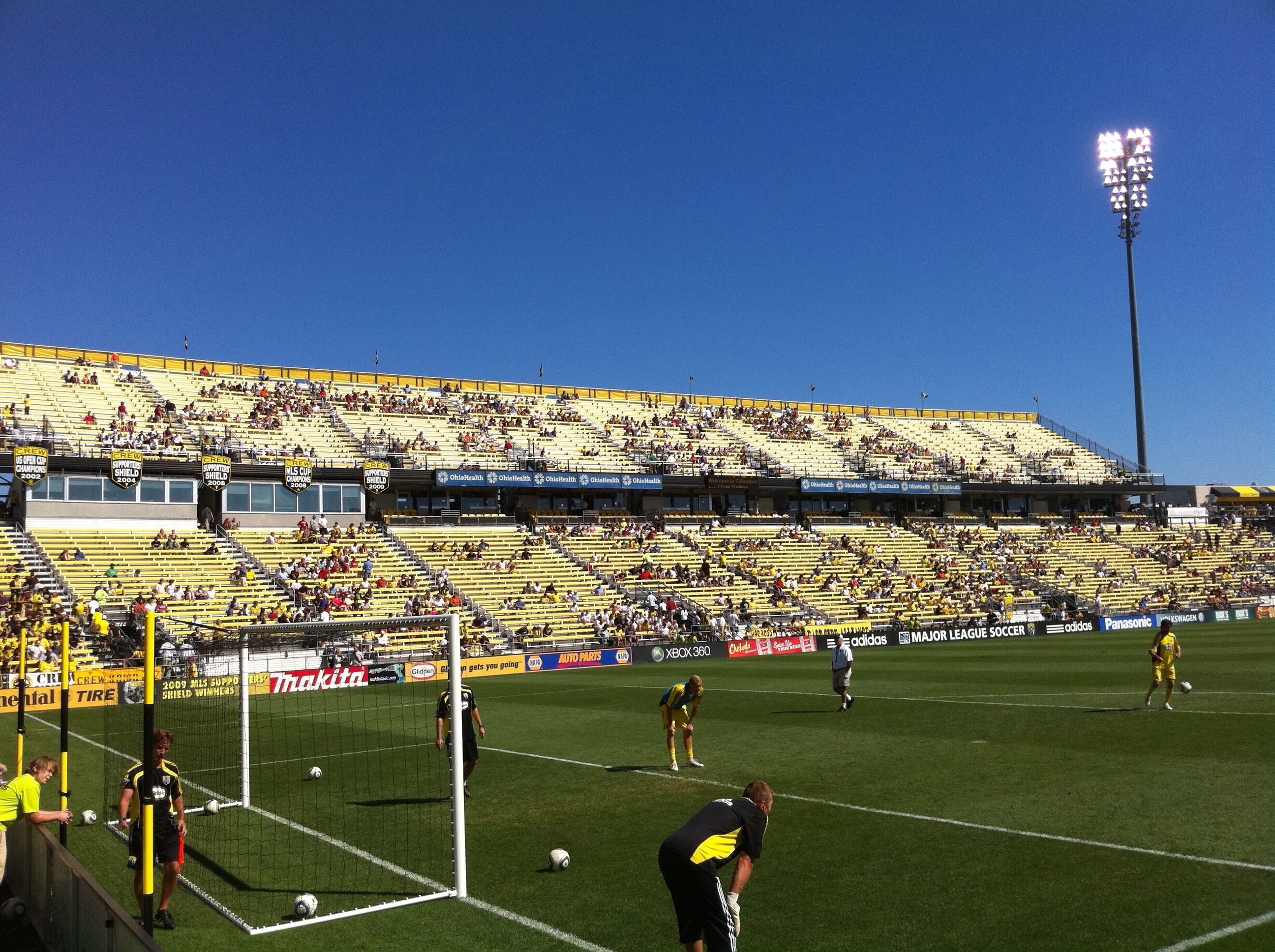
The Columbus Crew hosted U.S. Open Cup matches at Crew Stadium.

Prior to 2010 the Columbus Crew had been to the U.S. Open Cup final twice, in 1998 and again in 2002, winning the cup in the latter appearance. On June 29, 2010, the Crew began the competition in the third round, hosting the Rochester Rhinos of the D2 Pro League at Columbus Crew Stadium in Columbus, Ohio in front of a crowd of 1,760. The Crew's Andy Iro scored in the 30th minute by heading in a corner kick from teammate Eddie Gaven. In the second half, Rochester evened the score when substitute Darren Spicer scored from 17 yards out. The Rhinos' Alfonso Motagalvan was sent off in the 84th minute for a dangerous tackle on Emilio Rentería, forcing Rochester to play the final minutes of the game with 10 men. The score remained level until the fourth minute of stoppage time, when Steven Lenhart scored with a volley over the onrushing goalkeeper to give Columbus the victory.

A week later, on July 6, Columbus faced the Charleston Battery of the USL Second Division in the U.S. Open Cup quarterfinals. The match was hosted by Columbus, again at Crew Stadium in front of a crowd of 1,847. In the 37th minute, Lenhart was fouled in the penalty area while going for a cross and the referee signaled for a penalty kick. Rentería took the penalty kick and drove a right-footed shot into the back of the net, making the score 1–0. Columbus extended its lead in the 70th minute through a goal from Lenhart, and again in the 87th minute when Gaven scored from a pass from Emmanuel Ekpo. The Crew won 3–0, earning its first U.S. Open Cup semifinal appearance since 2002.

On September 1, 2010, the Columbus Crew visited Washington, D.C. to face MLS club D.C. United in the semifinal match at RFK Stadium in front of a crowd of 3,411. Pablo Hernandez scored in the 17th minute on a penalty kick to give D.C. an early lead which it almost held for the victory. However, in the 89th minute D.C.'s Marc Burch deflected a shot by Columbus's Iro into the net for an own goal, tying the score and sending the match into extra time. In the 97th minute, the Crew's Lenhart dribbled the ball into the 18-yard box and was tripped by D.C. United's Carey Talley to draw a penalty. Guillermo Barros Schelotto took the penalty kick and scored the winning goal. The 2–1 final score secured the Crew's spot in the final.

=== Seattle Sounders FC ===
We are the defending champions and we want to keep that title.

— Mike Seamon, Seattle Sounders FC midfielder

Seattle won the 2009 U.S. Open Cup—the second MLS expansion club to do so in its inaugural season after the Chicago Fire in 1998. Prior to the final, Sounders FC played U.S. Open Cup home games at the Starfire Sports Complex in Tukwila, Washington. The facility is smaller than the club's home stadium for league matches, Qwest Field, but Sounders FC representatives preferred the atmosphere at Starfire for smaller cup matches.

On June 30, 2010, Seattle began the defense of its title in a match hosted by the Portland Timbers of the D2 Pro League in Portland, Oregon, at PGE Park in front of a crowd of 15,422. Sounders FC took the lead in the 13th minute on a header from Nate Jaqua, but the Timbers levelled the score in the 38th minute when Bright Dike scored on a shot from inside the penalty area. The score was 1–1 at halftime, and remained that way through full-time and extra time. Seattle finally defeated Portland in a 4–3 penalty shootout with goalkeeper Kasey Keller making two saves and defender Zach Scott scoring the winning penalty kick.

Sounders FC hosted its quarterfinal match a week later on July 7 against an MLS club, the Los Angeles Galaxy, at Starfire Sports Complex in front of a sellout crowd of 4,512. Seattle forward Jaqua again led the attack scoring two goals in the second half. The first came in the 50th minute when he headed in a rebound off the crossbar and the second came in the 62nd minute off a cross from Miguel Montaño. Seattle won 2–0. Sounders FC's reserve goalkeeper Terry Boss also made two saves in his first start for the team.

On September 1, 2010, Seattle hosted its semifinal match against another MLS club, Chivas USA. Like the quarterfinal, it was hosted at Starfire with a sellout crowd of 4,547. Jaqua gained Seattle an early lead in the 10th minute off a Steve Zakuani cross. Zakuani was involved again in the 58th minute, this time crossing to a diving Fredy Montero who increased the lead to two. Chivas USA's Jesús Padilla scored in the 68th minute on a through ball from Justin Braun cutting the deficit to one. However, in second half stoppage time, Jaqua scored again making the score 3–1 and sealing the Sounders FC victory and an appearance in the tournament final. Jaqua's two goals raised his total to five in the tournament. Zakuani, who had just returned from a pelvic strain injury, had two assists in the match.

== Pre-match ==
=== Venue selection ===
I think we put in an aggressive bid [to host the cup final] but it's not surprising that Seattle would win because of the resources they have.

— Mark McCullers, Columbus Crew general manager

On August 26, 2010, U.S. Soccer announced the potential sites for the final, depending on the outcome of the semifinals. It was determined that if Seattle qualified for the final, they would host it at Qwest Field regardless of the opponent. If Chivas USA defeated Sounders FC in the semifinals, they would host the Columbus Crew at The Home Depot Center in Carson, California, or visit D.C. United at RFK Stadium in Washington, D.C., depending on the outcome of the other semifinal match. Since Columbus and Seattle advanced from the semifinals, the final was held at Qwest Field in Seattle. This was the first U.S. Open Cup final to be played in the state of Washington.

Columbus general manager Mark McCullers expressed concerns about the fairness of the scheduling since he claimed it would be difficult for the Crew to travel to the West Coast on October 5 and then return to Chicago three days later for a league match. Crew head coach Robert Warzycha also complained about the scheduling saying, "You make it to a final, but you have to go to Seattle on Sunday after playing a home game on Saturday... You've got to fly all day, play on the (artificial) turf on Tuesday and then you go play an important MLS game in Chicago on Friday. Great."

A year after a public argument between Seattle and D.C. United ownership over the fairness of the bidding process to host the 2009 U.S. Open Cup Final—which D.C. United hosted—Sounders FC was successful in its bid to host the 2010 final. For the 2009 final, D.C. United drew an attendance of 17,329 through extensive marketing efforts. Seattle began selling tickets to the 2010 final on September 7 and within six days 22,000 had already been sold.

=== Analysis ===
In 2010, prior to meeting in the U.S. Open Cup final, Sounders FC and the Crew met twice in MLS league matches. The first was played on May 1 at Qwest Field and finished in a 1–1 draw. The second meeting between the two teams was played on September 18, only 17 days before the Open Cup final, at Crew Stadium. Seattle won by a convincing scoreline of 4–0. Regarding the score of the latter meeting, Sounders FC coach Sigi Schmid stated, "I don't think the difference between the two teams is four goals even though that was the score." Discussing the difficulty of going into Seattle for the final, Crew forward Barros Schelotto commented, "The field is for Seattle. The stadium is for Seattle. Everything is for Seattle. But that does not matter. We have the final. We have 90 minutes to win a trophy. Nothing is more important."

In the weeks leading up to the match, Seattle Sounders FC was on a six-game home unbeaten streak. However, in the last match before the final (a league match victory over Toronto FC) goalkeeper Keller allowed a goal, ending his three-game shutout streak. The Columbus Crew came into the final not having won a league match in the previous month, although their last match was a 0–0 draw with the San Jose Earthquakes on October 2.

Since MLS teams began participating in the tournament in 1996, the home team had won nine times and lost three in the U.S. Open Cup final prior to 2011. The 2003 Chicago Fire, 2007 New England Revolution and 2009 Seattle Sounders FC were the only away teams to win a final.

== Match ==
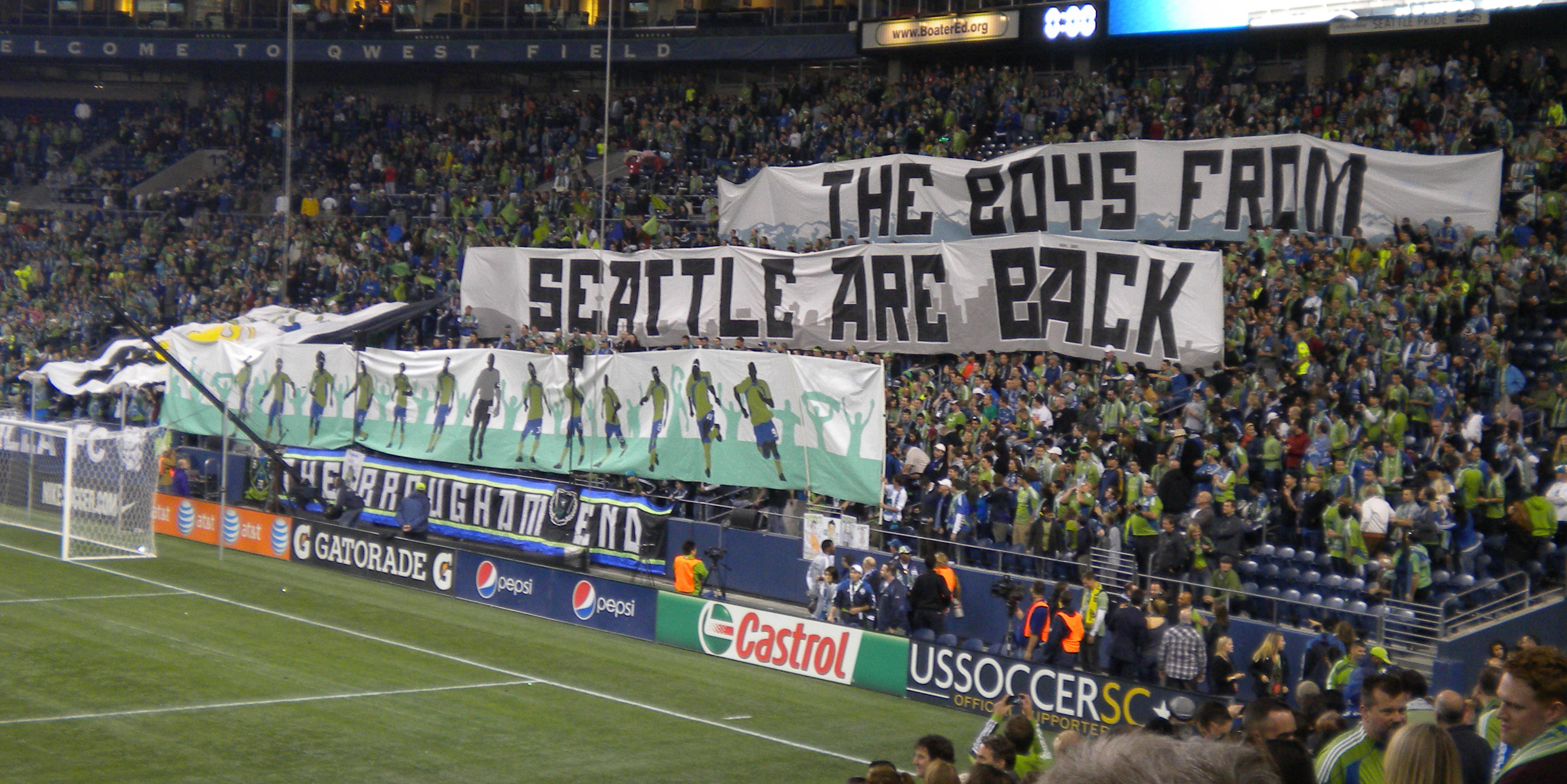
The Emerald City Supporters display a tifo prior to kickoff of the 2010 U.S. Open Cup final.

The 2010 U.S. Open Cup Final was played on October 5 at Qwest Field in Seattle, Washington. Live television coverage was provided nationally by Fox Soccer Channel. Prior to kickoff, Seattle's 2009 U.S. Open Cup trophy was displayed at midfield. The final drew an attendance of 31,311 surpassing the 81-year-old record for the event. The previous record attendance for an Open Cup final was 21,583, set in 1929 when New York Hakoah defeated the Madison Kennel Club of St. Louis.

Both clubs started mostly their first-team players for the final. Costa Rican Leonardo González, a regular starter at left back for Sounders FC, was unavailable due to U.S. Open Cup roster limitations, which allow teams to have only five foreign players on their 18-man, game day roster. Defender Tyson Wahl started in his place. Crew backup goalkeeper Andy Gruenebaum also started in place of normal starter Will Hesmer, though this was a normal change for U.S. Open Cup and CONCACAF Champions League matches. Each club was organized in a 4–4–2 formation at kickoff.

=== First half ===
Seattle had most of the early scoring opportunities. Two minutes into the match, Montero took the first shot of the game with a header at close range which was saved by Crew goalkeeper Gruenebaum. Seconds later, Montero had another shot from distance which went just over the bar. Four minutes later, Seattle midfielder Zakuani got around Crew defender Frankie Hejduk and passed the ball to Blaise Nkufo whose tap-in attempt was saved by Gruenbaum. In the 12th minute, Gaven took the Crew's first shot of the match but it flew high over the crossbar. In the 16th minute Zakuani had a run up the middle before passing to Montero, whose shot was again saved by Gruenbaum. Columbus successfully defended crosses from Zakuani and Nkufo in the 18th minute and kept Seattle from getting a shot off. Columbus nearly took the lead in the 20th minute as Emmanuel Ekpo got behind the defense and made a quick pass back to Gaven, who missed a wide-open shot over the bar.

While Seattle controlled the game for much of the first half, Columbus took the lead on a counterattack movement in the 24th minute. The play developed on the right side when Hejduk made a low pass to Lenhart from a forward position. Lenhart touched the ball to Kevin Burns for a low shot inside the far post for a goal. Few chances were created after the goal as Columbus' strong defensive play held off Seattle's attacks. In the 34th minute Tyson Wahl crossed the ball into the box but Gruenbaum was able to jump and grab the ball before Nkufo could direct it towards goal with his head.

Seattle equalized in the 38th minute. Montero passed to Tyson Wahl, who crossed the ball into the 18-yard-box, where Crew goalkeeper Gruenebaum hesitated on how to handle the ball. He knocked it away, and it fell to Nathan Sturgis, who passed the ball between the legs of Gaven to find teammate Sanna Nyassi 18 yards out. Nyassi turned on the ball and shot it past Gruenebaum, who was still out of position. Following the goal few scoring opportunities were created before halftime. After one minute of stoppage time, the first half ended with a tie score, 1–1.

=== Second half ===
Columbus Crew midfielder Kevin Burns commented on the team's attitude after the first half, "We were OK at halftime. Our heads weren't down." No substitutions were made as the teams returned to the field for the second half.

Despite Seattle's continued control of the tempo of gameplay early in the second half, they were unable to create many scoring opportunities. In the 58th minute James Riley was alone on the edge of the penalty area after receiving a pass from Montero. However, Riley's cross was deflected for a corner kick. Two minutes later Seattle's Zakuani created a scoring threat when he received an aerial pass into the penalty area, but Crew goalkeeper Gruenebaum was quick to get to the play causing Zakuani to fall down and the ball to bounce away before being cleared by Columbus. In the 64th minute, Kasey Keller made a diving save to stop Gaven's shot from 30 yards out, his fourth shot on goal in the game. Two minutes later, the score line finally changed as Seattle completed 18 consecutive passes. Montero got open on the right side of the field to receive the 19th and then crossed a ball into the penalty area. Gruenebaum decided not to chase the pass as Zakuani ran inside of Crew defender Hejduk and headed a shot that hit the crossbar. The Crew defenders failed to clear the ball before Nyassi ran in and easily scored the go-ahead goal.

Zakuani was again on the attack in the 75th minute with a run down the middle, but was "sandwiched" by two Columbus defenders and lost possession. Columbus made two substitutions in the 78th minute, bringing on fresh legs at forward with Rentería in for Lenhart and swapping midfielder Burns out for forward Andrés Mendoza. Shortly after the substitutions, Keller came out to grab a Columbus cross and made a long throw to Montero. Seattle pushed up the field and Montero took a shot which bounced off teammate Nkufo's back. In the 81st minute, Crew coach Warzycha made his final substitution bringing on Robbie Rogers for Gaven. Shortly after, in the 85th minute, Columbus nearly equalized when Rogers received a pass from Hejduk and took a shot which bounced hard off the crossbar.

Seattle made its first substitution in the 79th minute when Sanna Nyassi left the field to an ovation from the crowd as he was replaced by Álvaro Fernández. In the 87th minute, Zakuani ran free on a breakaway but was taken down by Crew forward Barros Schelotto who received a yellow card for the foul. Montero took the ensuing free kick and shot it on goal with Gruenebaum catching it for the save.

The referee added three minutes of stoppage time to the second half. During that time, Seattle made its remaining two substitutions. First in the 90th minute Roger Levesque was brought on for Zakuani, and then in the 93rd minute they brought on Jaqua for Montero. The referee blew his whistle ending the game shortly thereafter. Most of the fans in attendance remained after the game for the presentation of the trophy.

=== Match details ===
October 5, 2010
19:00 PDT

Seattle Sounders FC	2–1	Columbus Crew
Nyassi 38', 66'	Report	Burns 24'

Qwest Field, Seattle
Attendance: 31,311

Seattle Sounders	Columbus Crew

GK	18	Kasey Keller (c)
DF	7	James Riley	(yellow card) 23'
DF	4	Patrick Ianni
DF	31	Jeff Parke
DF	5	Tyson Wahl
MF	23	Sanna Nyassi	(yellow card) 75'	(substituted off) 79'
MF	6	Osvaldo Alonso	(yellow card) 74'
MF	12	Nathan Sturgis
MF	11	Steve Zakuani		(substituted off) 90'
FW	17	Fredy Montero		(substituted off) 90+3'
FW	9	Blaise Nkufo
Substitutes:
GK	28	Terry Boss
DF	14	Tyrone Marshall
MF	15	Álvaro Fernández		(substituted on) 79'
DF	20	Zach Scott
MF	21	Nate Jaqua		(substituted on) 90+3'
MF	22	Mike Seamon
FW	24	Roger Levesque		(substituted on) 90'
Manager:
Sigi Schmid

GK	30	Andy Gruenebaum
DF	2	Frankie Hejduk (c)
DF	14	Chad Marshall
DF	6	Andy Iro
DF	29	Shaun Francis	(yellow card) 28'
MF	12	Eddie Gaven		(substituted off) 81'
MF	16	Brian Carroll	(yellow card) 41'
MF	17	Emmanuel Ekpo
MF	15	Kevin Burns		(substituted off) 78'
FW	32	Steven Lenhart		(substituted off) 78'
FW	7	Guillermo Barros Schelotto	(yellow card) 87'
Substitutes:
GK	1	William Hesmer
DF	4	Gino Padula
FW	10	Andrés Mendoza		(substituted on) 78'
MF	18	Robbie Rogers		(substituted on) 81'
FW	20	Emilio Rentería		(substituted on) 78'
MF	22	Adam Moffat
DF	23	Eric Brunner
Manager:
Robert Warzycha

Man of the Match:
Sanna Nyassi

Referee:
Michael Kennedy

Assistant referees:
Thomas Supple
Paul Scott

Fourth official:
Ricardo Salazar

=== Statistics ===
First half

	Sounders FC	Crew
Goals scored	1	1
Total shots	4	4
Shots on target	3	1
Saves	0	2
Corner kicks	1	0
Fouls committed	6	5
Offsides	0	0
Yellow cards	1	2
Red cards	0	0

Second half

	Sounders FC	Crew
Goals scored	1	0
Total shots	6	6
Shots on target	2	0
Saves	1	1
Corner kicks	5	2
Fouls committed	5	5
Offsides	0	0
Yellow cards	2	1
Red cards	0	0

Overall

	Sounders FC	Crew
Goals scored	2	1
Total shots	10	10
Shots on target	5	1
Saves	1	3
Corner kicks	6	2
Fouls committed	11	10
Offsides	0	0
Yellow cards	3	3
Red cards	0	0

== Post-match ==
Sounders FC head coach Sigi Schmid discussed the match in the post-game press conference saying:

I thought there was some good soccer that was played by both teams. We caught a break at the end when they hit the crossbar. You work hard to make your own luck. We showed a lot of character going down 1–0 and coming back. Attitude of our team has been very strong that way. Really proud and what we accomplished tonight is super. It sets us apart and makes us unique and this is the kind of franchise when Adrian [Hanauer], Joe [Roth], Drew [Carey] and Tod Leiweke and the rest of the internal ownership group and everyone else who works at this organization wanted us to be something unique, something special, something different. The fans were fantastic. That's the loudest I've heard this place.

Columbus Crew goalkeeper Andy Gruenbaum commented after the match, "We knew it was going to be a tough place to play, their fan base is great. Anytime you have a championship match on your own pitch, the odds are going to be against you. We knew we had to defend and take advantage of any opportunity. We came out and scored the first goal and they were able to capitalize on two weird bounces."

Seattle Sounders FC is the first MLS club to repeat as the U.S. Open Cup champion and the first club overall to repeat since the New York Pancyprian-Freedoms did so in 1982 and 1983. The victory was also Sigi Schmid's third Open Cup championship as a head coach. Sanna Nyassi was the first player to score multiple goals in an Open Cup final since Mike Deleray in 1994. As champions of the tournament, Sounders FC received the $100,000 cash prize while the Columbus Crew received $50,000 as the runner-up. Seattle also earned a berth into the preliminary round of the 2011–12 CONCACAF Champions League.
