= Patrick Ianni =

American soccer player (born 1985)

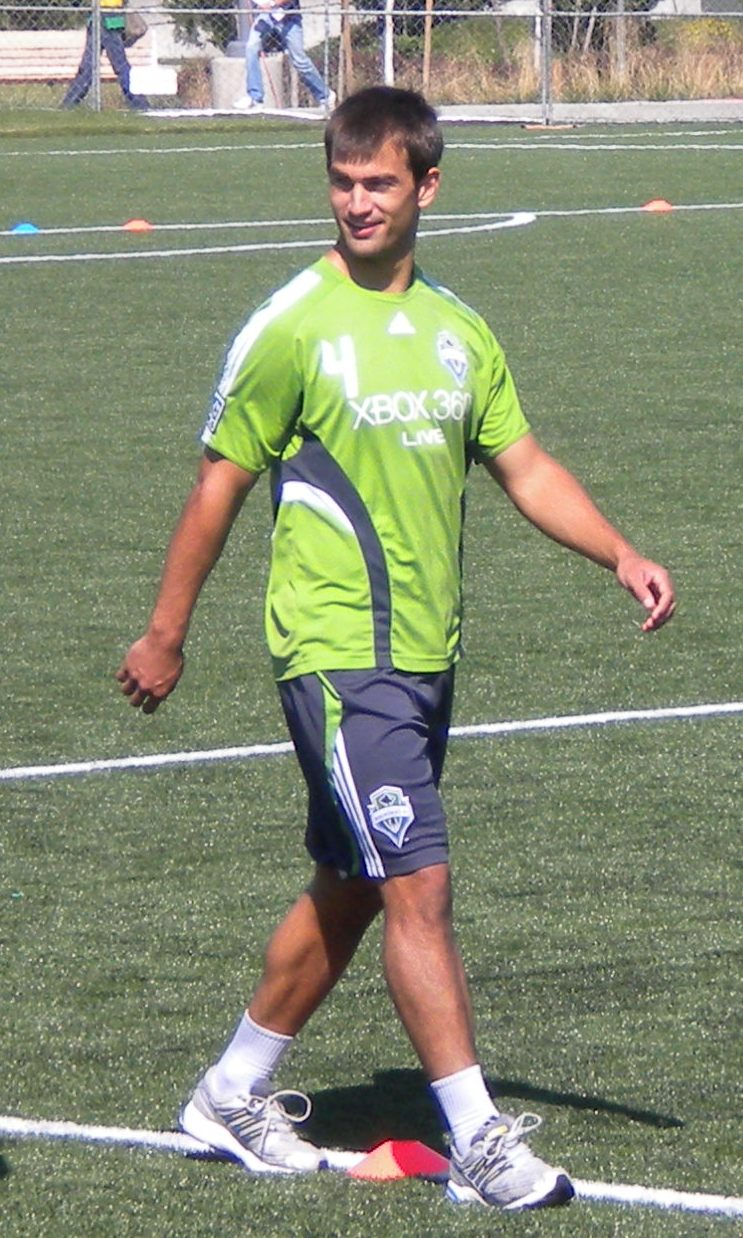
- Ianni training with Seattle Sounders

Personal information
- Full name: Patrick Edward Joseph Ianni
- Date of birth: June 15, 1985 (age 41)
- Place of birth: Lodi, California, United States
- Height: 6 ft 1 in (1.85 m)
- Position: Defender

College career
Years	Team	Apps	(Gls)
2003–2005	UCLA Bruins	58	(2)

Senior career*
Years	Team	Apps	(Gls)
2005	Southern California Seahorses	4	(0)
2006–2008	Houston Dynamo	35	(1)
2007	→ California Victory (loan)	2	(0)
2009–2013	Seattle Sounders FC	83	(3)
2014	Chicago Fire	12	(0)
2018	Orange County FC	0	(0)
Total		136	(4)

International career
2003–2005	United States U20	23	(1)
2007–2008	United States U23	3	(0)
- * Club domestic league appearances and goals

Patrick Edward Joseph Ianni (born June 15, 1985) is an American retired professional soccer player who played as a defender. He spent nine seasons in MLS for the Houston Dynamo, Seattle Sounders FC, and Chicago Fire.

== College and amateur career ==
Ianni played high school soccer for four years at Lodi High School, where he was a two time Parade All-American and a 2002-03 McDonald's All-American.

Ianni played college soccer at UCLA for three seasons. Following his sophomore season, he was named 2004 Pac-10 Co-Player of the Year along with C. J. Klaas. He was a semifinalist for the Hermann Trophy Award after his junior season. Ianni was a 1st-team All-Pac-10 for 2004 and 2005 and was NSCAA 2nd-team All-American in 2005.

He also played in the Premier Development League with the Southern California Seahorses.

== Professional career ==
=== Houston Dynamo ===
On January 20, 2006, Ianni was selected with the 8th overall pick by the Houston Dynamo in the 2006 MLS SuperDraft. He made his Dynamo and MLS debut on June 17, 2006, coming on as a substitute in a 2–1 win over Real Salt Lake. Ianni made 4 total appearances, 2 in the MLS regular season and 2 in the U.S. Open Cup. The Dynamo would win MLS Cup 2006, but Ianni did not appear in the playoffs.

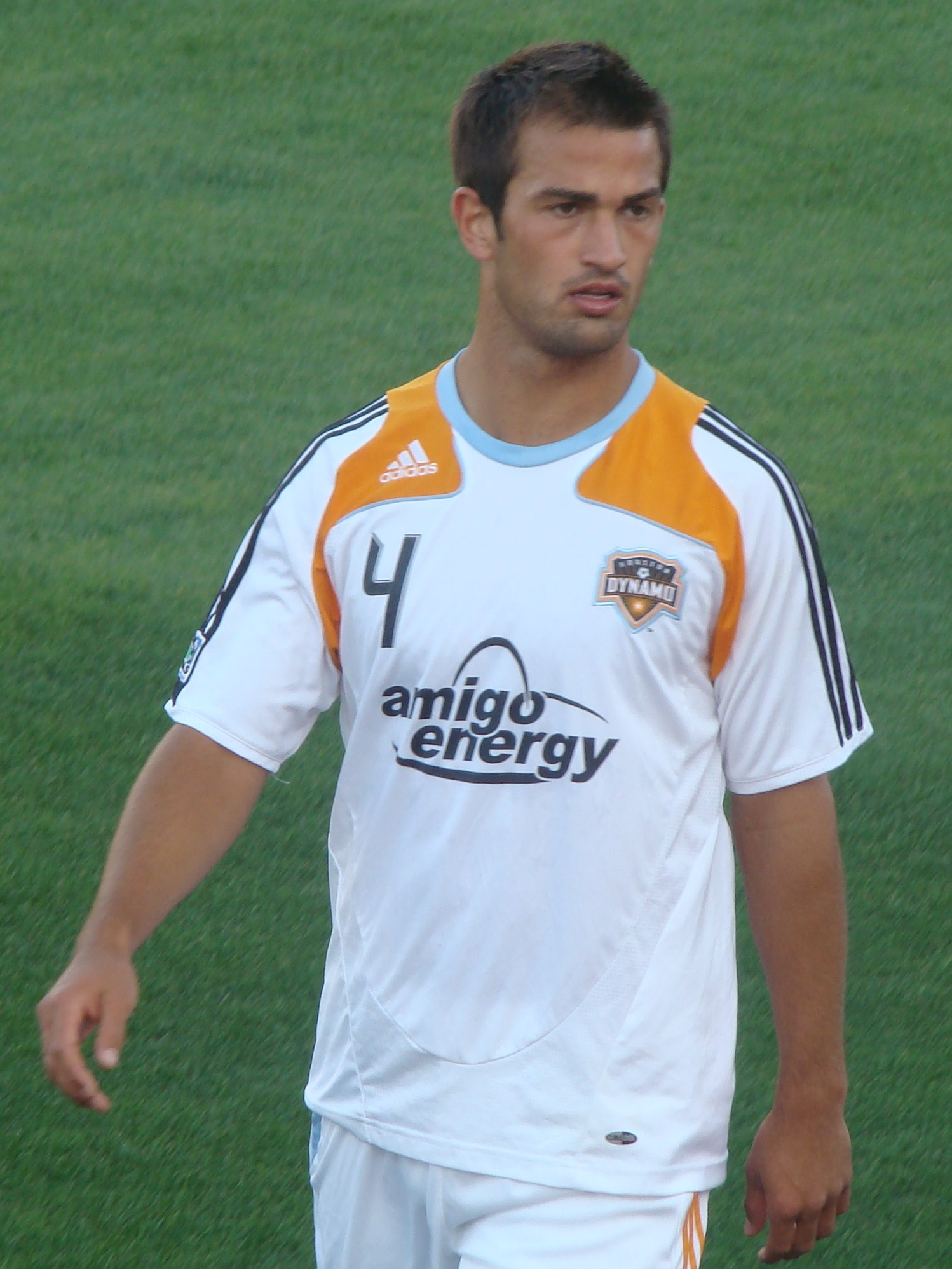
Ianni with the Dynamo in 2008

In May 2007, Ianni was loaned to the California Victory of the USL First Division, but he was recalled to Houston after making 2 appearances for the Victory. He made his first appearance of the season for the Dynamo on June 7, coming off the bench in a 2–1 victory against the Colorado Rapids. On June 24, Ianni made his first career MLS start and scored his first career goal in the 81st minute, giving Houston a 1–0 win over the Kansas City Wizards. Ianni made his debut in a continental competition on July 25, getting the start in a 1–0 victory over Club América in the North American SuperLiga. On August 14, Ianni picked up his first career red card in the SuperLiga semifinals against Pachuca, a match Houston would lose 4–3 on penalties. Ianni ended the season with 1 goal from 16 regular season appearances, helping the Dynamo finish 2nd in the Western Conference. Houston would go on to win MLS Cup 2007, but Ianni did not appear in the playoffs.

During the 2008 season, Ianni made 17 appearances in the MLS regular season and had 1 assist, helping Houston finish top of the Western Conference. He did not play in Houston's two playoff games. In continental play, Ianni made 2 appearances in the 2008 CONCACAF Champions' Cup, helping the Dynamo reach the semifinal, where they lost to Saprissa 3–0 on aggregate, and five appearances in 2008–09 CONCACAF Champions League group stage, helping Houston finish 2nd in their group. He also made 3 appearances in the 2008 North American SuperLiga, helping the Dynamo reach the final, where they lost 6–5 to the New England Revolution in a penalty shoot-out.

=== Seattle Sounders FC ===
On January 26, 2009, Houston traded Ianni to the Seattle Sounders FC in exchange for a conditional pick in the 2010 MLS SuperDraft. He made his Sounders debut on May 16, 2009, a 1–1 draw with FC Dallas. On July 11 Ianni scored his first goal for the Sounders off a bicycle kick to give Seattle a 2–1 win against his former club Houston Dynamo. The goal was named the MLS Goal of the Week and was nominated for the 2009 MLS Goal of the Year. He ended the regular season with 1 goal and 2 assists in 17 appearances, helping the Sounders finish 3rd in the Western Conference and qualify for the playoffs. Ianni made 1 appearance in the playoffs as Seattle lost to Houston 1–0 on aggregate in the first round. He also made 5 appearances in the U.S. Open Cup, including a start in the final, a 2–1 victory over D.C. United.

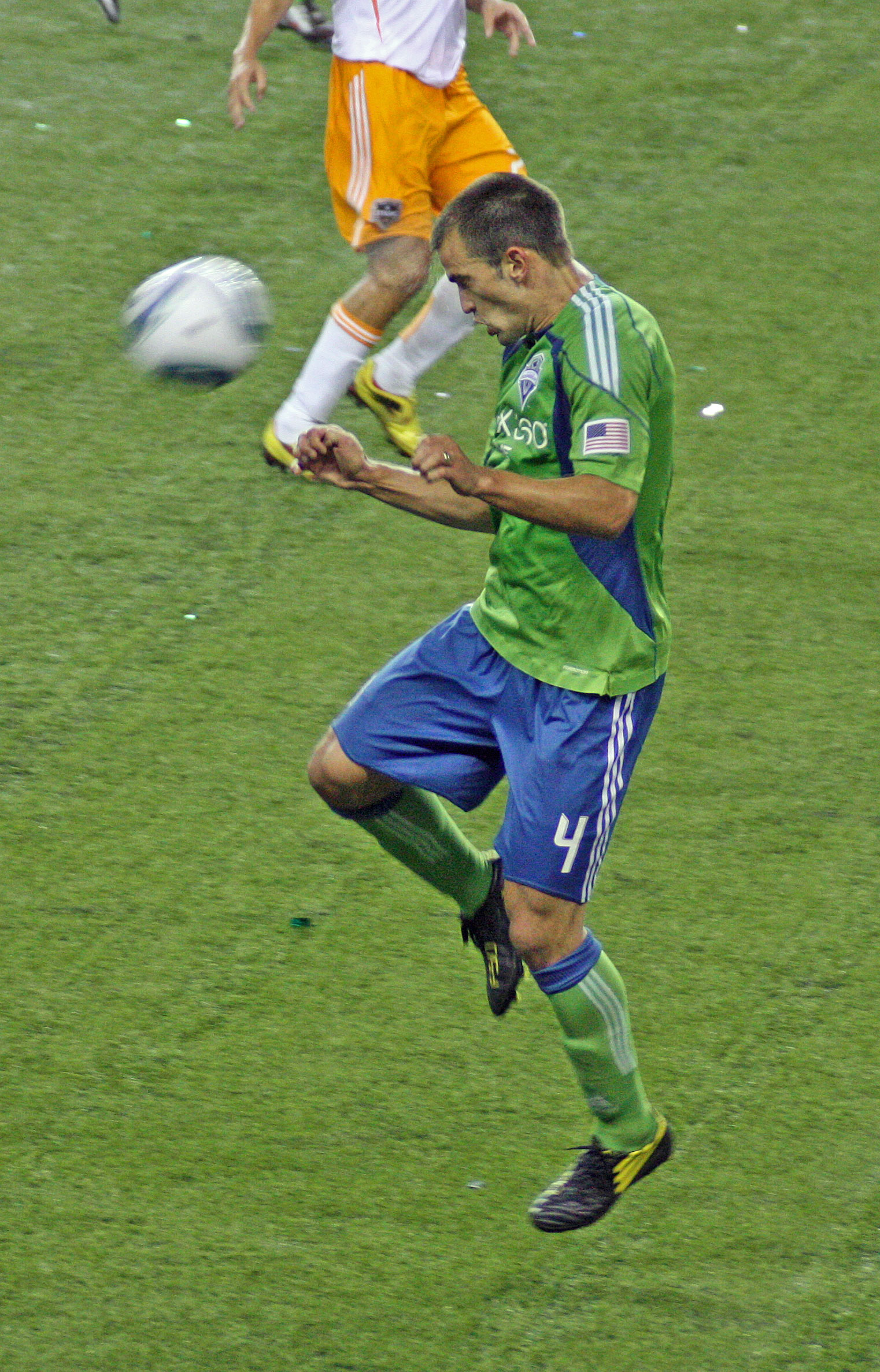
Ianni playing for Seattle in 2010

During the 2010 season, Ianni made 25 MLS regular season appearances, a career high, as the Sounders finished 4th in the Western Conference and qualified for the playoffs. He appeared in both legs of their matchup with the Los Angeles Galaxy, but Seattle lost 3–1 on aggregate. Ianni made 3 appearances during the Sounders run in the 2010 Open Cup. He started the final as Seattle beat the Columbus Crew 2–1 to win back to back Open Cup titles. He also made 2 appearances in the CONCACAF Champions League.

After being on the bench for the first two games, Ianni made his first appearance of the 2011 on March 25, getting the start in a 1–1 draw with Houston. He scored his first goal of the season on May 28 in a 2–1 win for Seattle against Real Salt Lake. Ianni ended the regular season with 1 goal from 16 appearances, helping the Sounders finish 2nd in the conference and qualify for the playoffs. However, Ianni did not feature in either of Seattle's two playoff games. He made 1 appearance in the 2011 Open Cup, a 3–1 win over the Galaxy in the quarterfinals, as the Sounders won their third straight Open Cup title. Ianni also played 5 times in the Champions League, once in the preliminary round and 4 times in the group stage, helping Seattle finish 2nd in their group.

On June 20, 2012, Ianni scored to help Seattle to a 1–1 draw with Sporting Kansas City. His acrobatic volley was named the MLS Goal of the Week and later was voted the MLS Goal of the Year. Ianni made 16 appearances and scored 1 goal in the MLS regular season, helping the Sounders finish 3rd in the Western Conference. He did not appear in any of Seattle's 4 playoff games. Ianni made 3 appearances in the 2012 Open Cup, helping the Sounders become the third team to reach four consecutive Open Cup finals and the first since 1937. In the final, Ianni got the start and played 118 minutes before being sent off for his second yellow card. Sporting Kansas City would go on to win the match 3–2 on penalties. He also made 2 appearances in the 2012–13 CCL group stage, helping Seattle finish top of their group.

In January 2013, Ianni broke his foot during preseason fitness testing. He made his first appearance of the season on July 28, getting the start in a 1–1 draw with Chivas USA. Ianni made 9 appearances during the regular season as the Sounders finished 4th in the conference and qualified for the playoffs. Ianni did not make an appearance for Seattle in the playoffs.

=== Chicago Fire ===
On January 15, 2014, Ianni was traded to the Chicago Fire along with teammate Jhon Kennedy Hurtado and the 13th overall pick in the 2014 MLS SuperDraft in exchange for Jalil Anibaba, the 8th overall selection in the 2014 SuperDraft, and a conditional third-round pick in the 2015 MLS SuperDraft. He made his Fire debut on March 16, coming off the bench in a 1–1 draw with the Portland Timbers. Ianni made 12 league appearances and 2 in the Open Cup as Chicago finished 9th in the Eastern Conference, missing out on the playoffs. On November 18, 2014, Chicago declined his contract option for the 2015 season.

Ianni announced his retirement from professional soccer on January 12, 2015.

=== Orange County FC ===
He came out of retirement in 2018 to play for semi-professional NPSL side Orange County FC.

== International career ==
Ianni was a member of the U.S. U-20 national team at the 2005 FIFA World Youth Championship in the Netherlands, and the U.S. U-23 national team at the 2008 Summer Olympics in Beijing.

== Personal life ==
Ianni was born and raised in Lodi, California. He attended Lodi High School and UCLA, where he majored in sociology. Ianni is the brother of retired soccer player Tayt Ianni, who won an NCAA Championship at UCLA, played for the San Jose Clash in MLS, and earned a cap for the U.S. national team.

== Career statistics ==
=== Club ===
As of January 25, 2021

Appearances and goals by club, season and competition
Club	Season	League			Open Cup		Playoffs		Continental		Total	
Club	Season	Division	Apps	Goals	Apps	Goals	Apps	Goals	Apps	Goals	Apps	Goals
Southern California Seahorses	2005	PDL	4	0	—		0	0	—		4	0
Houston Dynamo	2006	MLS	2	0	2	0	0	0	—		4	0
Houston Dynamo	2007	MLS	16	1	1	0	0	0	3 (Note: Appearances in North American SuperLiga)	0	20	1
Houston Dynamo	2008	MLS	17	0	0	0	0	0	10 (Note: Two appearances in CONCACAF Champions' Cup, three appearances in North American SuperLiga, and five appearances in CONCACAF Champions League)	0	27	0
Houston Dynamo	Total		35	1	3	0	0	0	13	0	51	1
California Victory (loan)	2007	USL-1	2	0	0	0	—		—		2	0
Seattle Sounders FC	2009	MLS	17	1	5	0	1	0	—		23	1
Seattle Sounders FC	2010	MLS	25	0	3	0	2	0	2 (Note: Appearances in CONCACAF Champions League)	0	32	0
Seattle Sounders FC	2011	MLS	16	1	1	0	0	0	5	0	22	1
Seattle Sounders FC	2012	MLS	16	1	3	0	0	0	2	0	21	1
Seattle Sounders FC	2013	MLS	9	0	0	0	0	0	0	0	9	0
Seattle Sounders FC	Total		83	3	12	0	3	0	9	0	107	3
Chicago Fire	2014	MLS	12	0	2	1	—		—		14	1
Career total			136	4	17	1	3	0	22	0	178	5

== Honors ==
Houston Dynamo

- Major League Soccer MLS Cup (2): 2006, 2007

Seattle Sounders FC

- Lamar Hunt U.S. Open Cup (3): 2009, 2010, 2011

Individual

- MLS Goal of the Year Award (1): 2012
