= Miguel Montaño =

Colombian footballer (born 1991)

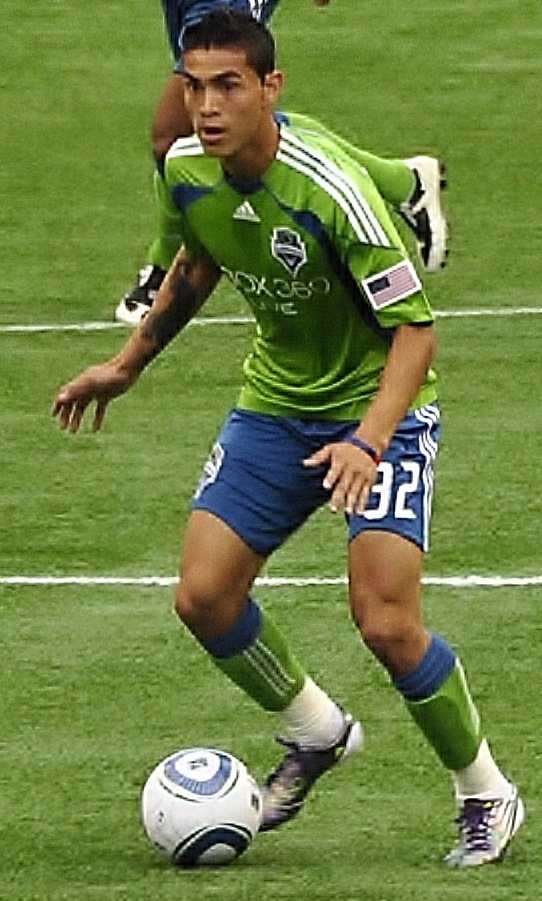
- Montaño playing for the Seattle Sounders in 2010.

Personal information
- Full name: Miguel Eduardo Montaño Bejarano
- Date of birth: 25 June 1991 (age 35)
- Place of birth: Palmira, Colombia
- Height: 5 ft 11 in (1.80 m)
- Position: Midfielder

Team information
- Current team: Victoria Hotspurs
- Number: 10

Youth career
- 2006: Deportivo Pereira
- 2007: Selección Palmira
- 2008: Envigado

Senior career*
Years	Team	Apps	(Gls)
2009–2010	Quilmes	19	(13)
2010	→ Seattle Sounders FC (loan)	6	(0)
2011	Seattle Sounders FC	2	(0)
2011	→ Montreal Impact (loan)	6	(1)
2012	Montreal Impact	3	(0)
2012	→ Deportivo Cali (loan)	1	(0)
2013	Cúcuta Deportivo	2	(0)
2013–2014	Uniautónoma	11	(1)
2014	Quilmes	4	(0)
2015–2017	Victoria Hotspurs	9	(14)
2018	Orsomarso	14	(2)
2019–	Victoria Hotspurs		

International career
2010	Colombia U20	1	(0)
- * Club domestic league appearances and goals as of 15:30, 9 May 2019 (UTC)

Miguel Montaño (born 25 June 1991) is a Colombian footballer who plays for Victoria Hotspurs in Malta.

== Club career ==
Montaño began his career in the youth ranks of Deportivo Pereira in 2006 before moving to Selección Palmira the following season. In 2008, he joined Envigado and was a top prospect for the club scoring 18 goals in 24 matches with the reserve team. His play while on the books of the Envigado reserve team helped him draw interest from Argentina's Quilmes. He joined Quilmes in 2009 and scored 13 goals in 19 appearances for the club.

On 17 March 2010, Montaño joined Seattle Sounders FC on loan from Quilmes. He made his debut for the club in a 4–0 loss at home to the Los Angeles Galaxy. On 14 March 2011, Seattle announced that they had re-signed Montaño.

He was sent on loan to NASL club Montreal Impact on 15 August 2011. While on loan with Montreal he appeared in six league matches scoring one goal. Montaño impressed the club and on 7 December 2011, it was announced that he would be joining the club permanently during their inaugural season in Major League Soccer.

Montreal announced in December 2012 that Montaño would not return for the 2013 season.

In July 2014, Montaño rejoined his first professional club Quilmes in Argentine Primera División.

Miguel Montano joined Victoria Hotspurs after trials in the BOV Premier League in Malta during the summer months. Montano was very present throughout September in the first matches of the Gozo Championship 2015/2016.

On 28 January 2019, Victoria Hotspurs announced, that they had re-signed Miguel for the rest of the 2018/19 season. Migual had been away from the club since the end of the 2015/16 season, and had meanwhile been playing for Orsomarso in his home country.

== International career ==
Montaño made his debut for the Colombia Under-20 national team in 2010.

== Career statistics ==
Club performance			League		Cup		Continental		Total	
Season	Club	League	Apps	Goals	Apps	Goals	Apps	Goals	Apps	Goals
Argentina			League		Cup		South America		Total	
2009–2010	Quilmes	Primera B Nacional	19	13	0	0	0	0	19	13
USA			League		Open Cup		North America		Total	
2010	Seattle Sounders FC	Major League Soccer	6	0	2	0	4	0	12	0
2011	Seattle Sounders FC	Major League Soccer	2	0	1	0	0	0	3	0
Canada			League		Voyageurs Cup		North America		Total	
2011	Montreal Impact (loan)	North American Soccer League	6	1	0	0	0	0	6	1
2012	Montreal Impact	Major League Soccer	3	0	0	0	0	0	3	0
Colombia			League		Cup		South America		Total	
2012	Deportivo Cali (loan)	Categoría Primera A	1	0	0	0	0	0	1	0
2013	Cúcuta Deportivo	Categoría Primera A	2	0	6	0	0	0	8	0
2013	Uniautónoma	Categoría Primera B	11	1	0	0	0	0	11	1
Total	Argentina		19	13	0	0	0	0	19	13
Total	USA		8	0	3	0	4	0	15	0
Total	Canada		9	1	0	0	0	0	9	1
Total	Colombia		14	1	6	0	0	0	20	1
Career total			50	15	9	0	4	0	63	15

== Honors ==
Seattle Sounders

- Lamar Hunt U.S. Open Cup: 2010, 2011

Uniautónoma

- Categoría Primera B: 2013
