= Terry Boss =

American soccer player (born 1981)

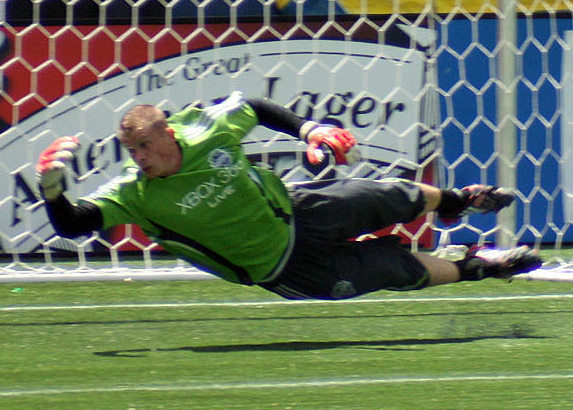

Personal information
- Full name: Terrence Boss
- Date of birth: September 1, 1981 (age 45)
- Place of birth: Philomath, Oregon, United States
- Height: 6 ft 3 in (1.91 m)
- Position: Goalkeeper

College career
| Years | Team | Apps | (Gls) |
| 2000–2004 | Tulsa Golden Hurricane | 24 | (0) |

Senior career*
| Years | Team | Apps | (Gls) |
| 2003 | Cascade Surge | 9 | (0) |
| 2004 | Vermont Voltage | 2 | (0) |
| 2004 | Fort Wayne Fever | 2 | (0) |
| 2005 | Charlotte Eagles | 2 | (0) |
| 2006–2007 | Puerto Rico Islanders | 2 | (0) |
| 2007–2008 | Charlotte Eagles | 20 | (0) |
| 2008–2009 | New York Red Bulls | 0 | (0) |
| 2009–2011 | Seattle Sounders | 1 | (0) |
| Total | | 38 | (0) |

International career
| 2008–2011 | Puerto Rico | 7 | (0) |

Managerial career
- 2012: Tulsa Golden Hurricane (assistant)
- 2013: Oregon State Beavers (assistant)
- 2014–2017: Virginia Cavaliers (associate head)
- 2018–2022: Oregon State Beavers
- 2023–2024: Austin FC (assistant)
- 2025: Lexington SC
- 2026–: Austin FC (assistant)
- * Club domestic league appearances and goals

Terrence Boss (born September 1, 1981) is an American soccer coach and former professional goalkeeper, who was the head coach for USL Championship club Lexington SC.

== Career ==
=== College and amateur ===
Boss played college soccer for the University of Tulsa from 2000–2004, starting 20 games, and also featured for Cascade Surge, Vermont Voltage and Fort Wayne Fever in the USL Premier Development League.

=== Professional ===
Boss began his professional career in the 2005 season with the Charlotte Eagles in the USL Second Division. In 2006, he moved to the Puerto Rico Islanders in the USL First Division, serving as the club's backup goalkeeper. In 2008 Boss returned to Charlotte and was the starting goalkeeper for a team that finished in first place in USL2, before losing in the league's title game to the Cleveland City Stars. He led USL-2 in wins (11) and shutouts (9). He was named the USL2's Goalkeeper of the Year for 2008.

Boss signed with the New York Red Bulls on September 15, 2008, but suffered a torn posterior cruciate ligament as the team was preparing for its playoff run and never played for the team. He was waived by New York on May 27, 2009.

On June 26, 2009, Boss signed with Seattle Sounders FC. Boss made his Sounders FC debut against Chelsea in a friendly. He played the whole second half and made a few good saves.

He made his MLS debut on April 22, 2010 in the Sounders' game against FC Dallas as a second-half substitute for an injured Kasey Keller.

On November 30, 2011, Boss was forced to retire due to a history of concussions.

=== International ===
Boss's stay with the Puerto Rico Islanders helped him to qualify to play for the Puerto Rico national football team. Boss earned a shutout in his first international cap for Puerto Rico in a 1–0 victory over the Dominican Republic in a World Cup Qualifier in March 2008.

== Coaching ==
Boss spent 4 seasons on the coaching staff at University of Virginia. In December 2017 it was announced he would take over as head coach for the Men's Team at Oregon State University. His first season saw him earn Pac-12 Coach Of The Year honors for the 2018 season.

In January 2019, it was announced that Boss would join the US Men's National Team's January training camp as a coach.

Boss would continue his work with the US Men's National Team during the 2019 Gold Cup campaign.

Boss departed Oregon State in December 2022, and was hired in 2023 as an assistant coach by Austin FC.

In December 2024, Boss was named head coach for Lexington SC of the USL Championship.

== Honors ==
Charlotte Eagles

- USL Second Division Championship (1): 2005

Seattle Sounders FC

- Lamar Hunt U.S. Open Cup (2): 2010, 2011

== Personal ==
A Philomath, Oregon, native, Boss is married to Hannah. His brother, Kevin, won a Super Bowl championship as a tight end with the New York Giants and also played for the Oakland Raiders and Kansas City Chiefs.
