= Zach Scott =

American soccer player (born 1980)

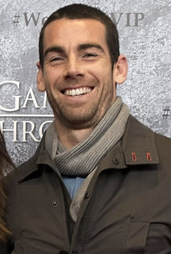
- Scott in 2013

Personal information
- Full name: Zacharias Scott
- Date of birth: July 2, 1980 (age 46)
- Place of birth: Haiku-Pauwela, Hawaii, United States
- Height: 5 ft 11 in (1.80 m)
- Position: Defender

College career
Years	Team	Apps	(Gls)
1998–2001	Gonzaga Bulldogs	48	(5)

Senior career*
Years	Team	Apps	(Gls)
2002–2008	Seattle Sounders	154	(8)
2009–2016	Seattle Sounders FC	118	(1)
Total		272	(9)
- * Club domestic league appearances and goals

Zacharias Scott (born July 2, 1980) is an American former professional soccer player who played as a defender for Seattle Sounders FC of Major League Soccer. A one-club player, Scott now serves as a periodic contributor to local Seattle Sounders television broadcasts.

== Career ==
=== Youth and college ===
Scott grew up in Hawaii where he attended Maui High School. He was an All State soccer player his senior season. He then attended Gonzaga, playing on the men's soccer team from 1998 to 2001.

=== Professional ===
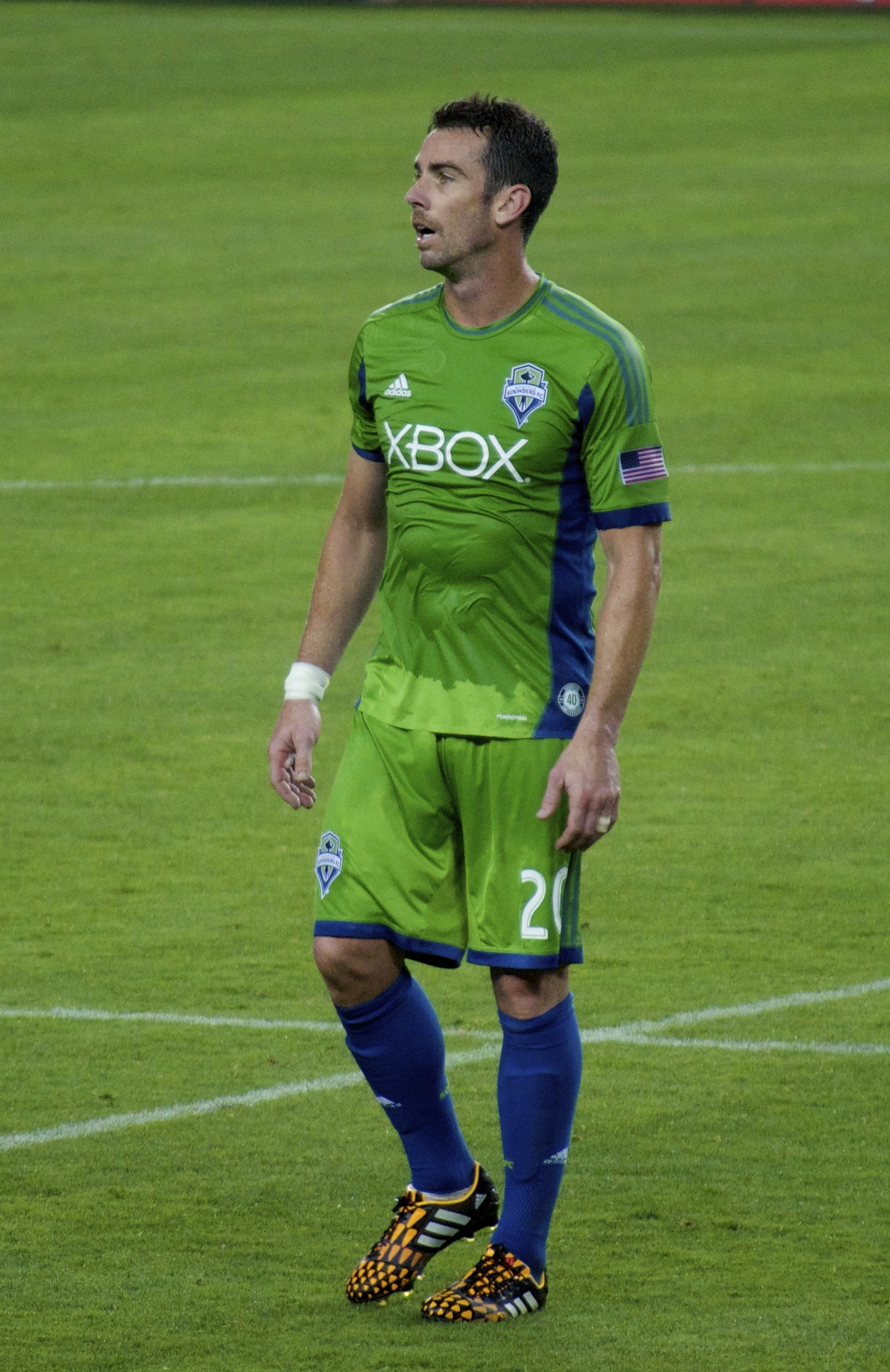
Playing for the Seattle Sounders in 2014

Scott signed with the Seattle Sounders of the USL First Division in 2002. On October 3, 2002, he signed with the Cleveland Force of the Major Indoor Soccer League. However, he ended the season with the San Diego Sockers. Scott signed a one-year contract with the Sockers in the fall of 2003, but took an indefinite leave of absence from the team in December 2003 and never rejoined the Sockers.

The most memorable game of Scott's 2008 season was in the quarter finals of the US Open Cup against the Kansas City Wizards, where he capped an outstanding defensive performance with the winning penalty shootout goal, sending Seattle to the semifinals for the second year in a row.

After two months on trial, Scott signed with Major League Soccer expansion side Seattle Sounders FC in February 2009.

On September 15, 2016, Scott said that he would retire at the end of the 2016 season, his 15th with the Sounders. He had been nicknamed "Mr. Sounder" by former Sounders coach Sigi Schmid for his career with the club as well as his personality. The Sounders went on to win the MLS Cup Final in Scott's last season and he finished his playing career with one MLS title, two USL First Division titles, four U.S. Open Cups and an MLS Supporters' Shield.

On March 1, 2017, Seattle Sounders FC and the ECS supporters' group hosted a testimonial match for Scott to honor his 15-year career with the organization.

== Career statistics ==
Appearances and goals by club, season and competition
Club	Season	League			Playoffs		U.S. Open Cup		Champions League		Total	
Club	Season	Division	Apps	Goals	Apps	Goals	Apps	Goals	Apps	Goals	Apps	Goals
Seattle Sounders FC	2009	MLS	9	0	0	0	0	0	–		9	0
Seattle Sounders FC	2010	MLS	4	0	0	0	2	0	4	0	10	0
Seattle Sounders FC	2011	MLS	12	0	1	0	3	0	7	0	23	0
Seattle Sounders FC	2012	MLS	20	1	3	1	5	1	3	0	31	3
Seattle Sounders FC	2013	MLS	21	0	2	0	1	0	3	0	27	0
Seattle Sounders FC	2014	MLS	18	0	4	0	5	1	–		27	1
Seattle Sounders FC	2015	MLS	20	0	3	0	0	0	3	0	26	0
Seattle Sounders FC	2016	MLS	14	0	3	0	3	0	0	0	20	0
Career total			118	1	16	1	19	2	20	0	173	4

== Honors ==
Seattle Sounders (USL)

- USL First Division Championship: 2005, 2007
- A-League/USL-1 Commissioner's Cup: 2002, 2007
- A-League Western Conference Championship: 2004

Seattle Sounders FC

- MLS Cup: 2016
- MLS Supporters' Shield: 2014
- Lamar Hunt U.S. Open Cup: 2009, 2010, 2011, 2014
