= Álvaro Fernández (Uruguayan footballer) =

Uruguayan footballer (born 1985)

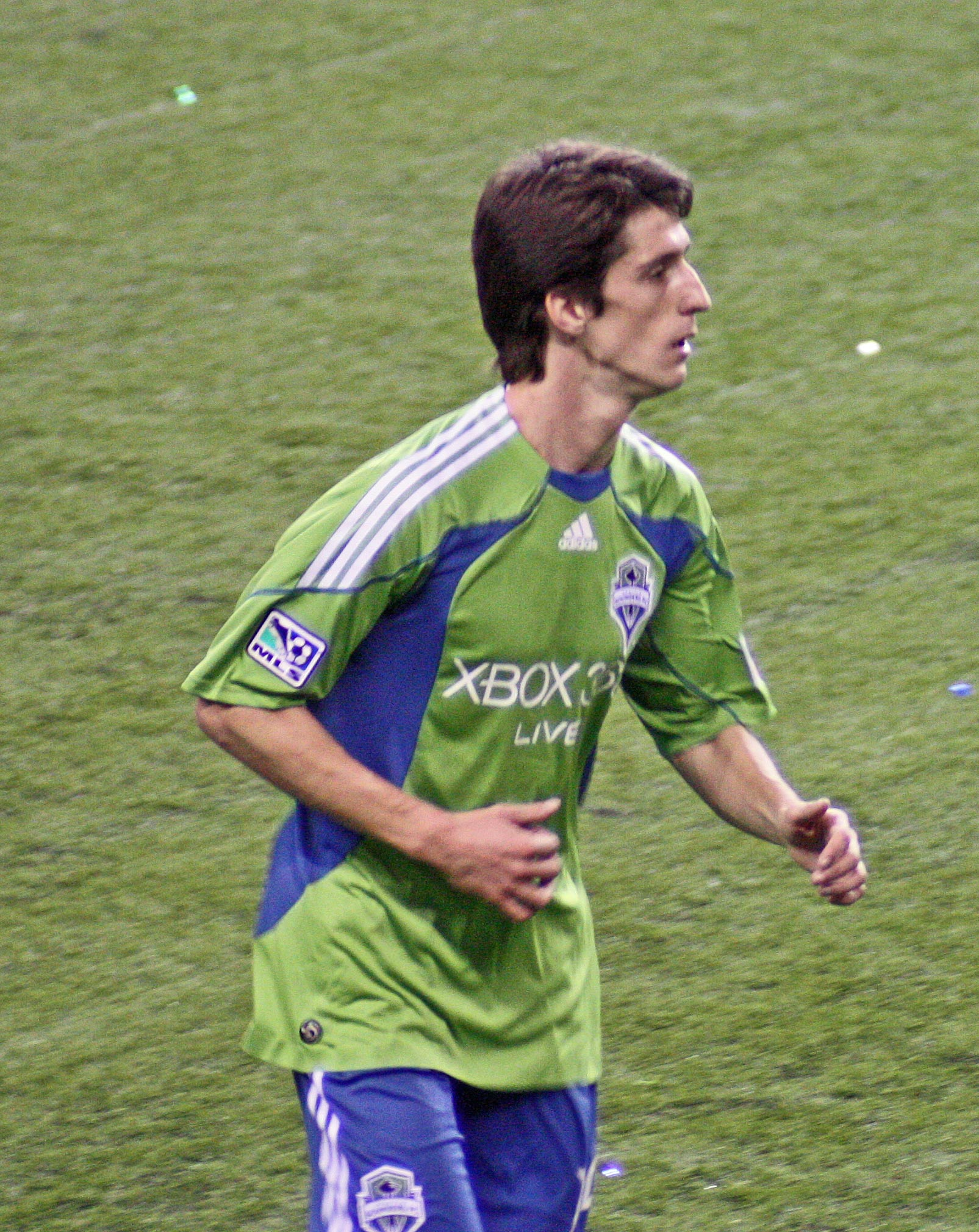

Personal information
- Full name: Álvaro Fernández Gay
- Date of birth: 11 October 1985 (age 41)
- Place of birth: Villa Soriano, Uruguay
- Height: 1.85 m (6 ft 1 in)
- Position: Midfielder

Youth career
- 2001–2005: Uruguay Montevideo

Senior career*
Years	Team	Apps	(Gls)
2005–2006	Uruguay Montevideo	10	(1)
2006–2007	Atenas	15	(3)
2007–2008	Montevideo Wanderers	43	(3)
2008	Puebla	12	(0)
2009–2010	Nacional	10	(4)
2009	→ Vitória (loan)	9	(0)
2010	→ Universidad de Chile (loan)	11	(1)
2010–2012	Seattle Sounders FC	59	(13)
2012–2014	Chicago Fire	13	(2)
2013	→ Al Rayyan (loan)	5	(0)
2013	→ Nacional (loan)	14	(0)
2014	→ Gimnasia (LP) (loan)	12	(2)
2014–2016	Gimnasia (LP)	45	(3)
2016–2017	Seattle Sounders FC	23	(1)
2017–2018	San Martín de San Juan	25	(2)
2018–2019	San Martín de Tucumán	6	(0)
2019	Rampla Juniors	14	(1)
2019–2024	Plaza Colonia	102	(9)

International career
2009–2012	Uruguay	12	(0)

Managerial career
- 2026–: Uruguay U16
- * Club domestic league appearances and goals as of 00:02, 18 February 2023 (UTC)

Álvaro Fernández Gay (Spanish pronunciation: [ˈalβaɾo feɾˈnandes]; born 11 October 1985) is a Uruguayan professional football manager and former player who played as a midfielder. He is currently the manager of the Uruguay national under-16 team.

== Career ==
=== Club ===
Fernández began his career with Atenas de San Carlos. His performances for Atenas led him to sign for Montevideo Wanderers in 2007.

In his one season with Wanderers Fernández appeared in 27 league matches scoring 1 goal. In 2008, he joined Mexican side Puebla before returning to Uruguay to play for top side Nacional. In the 2009 Copa Libertadores Second Stage, Fernández scored a goal against Club Nacional of Paraguay and River Plate. While at Nacional Fernández scored several key goals in helping his side capture the 2008–09 league title.

He was then loaned out to Portuguese side Vitória in 2009. This was his first club experience outside of the Americas. In 2010, he was again loaned out to Universidad de Chile. During his stay at the club, he scored a goal in a 3–2 win at the Maracanã against Brazilian club Flamengo in the quarterfinals of the 2010 Copa Libertadores.

On 21 July 2010, rumors began circulating that Fernández had been transferred to the Seattle Sounders FC. On 29 July, the Sounders announced the signing was complete. Fernández became the third Designated Player in the team's history. He made his first appearance for the Sounders on 31 July as a substitute in a 1–0 win against the San Jose Earthquakes. On 3 August, Fernández came on as a substitute and scored his first goal for the Sounders as in a 1–1 draw (2–1 aggregate score) against Isidro Metapán to get the Sounders into the group stage of the CONCACAF Champions League.

On 27 July 2012, Fernández was traded to the Chicago Fire for allocation money. This move opened up a DP slot for newcomer Christian Tiffert. He signed a 6-month long loan deal with Qatari club Al Rayyan on 16 January 2013.

Fernández was again loaned out by Chicago on 9 July 2013 when he returned to his former club Nacional. He retired on January 1 2024.

=== International ===
Fernández made his first international appearance for Uruguay on 1 April 2009. He came on as a substitute in the 40th minute during a World Cup qualifying match against Chile, which ended as a 0–0 draw. He has won 11 caps for the Uruguay national football team. During qualification Fernández played in six games and played 246 minutes, 41 minutes per game. Fernández played for Uruguay at the 2010 FIFA World Cup in South Africa appearing in four matches helping Uruguay to a fourth-place finish.

== Personal life ==
During the week of 6 September 2010, Fernández's wife gave birth to a baby boy, whom they named Bobby Valentino.

Fernández received a U.S. green card in March 2012. This qualifies him as a domestic player for MLS roster purposes.

== Honours ==
Club Nacional de Football

- Uruguayan Primera División (1): 2008–09

Seattle Sounders FC

- Major League Soccer: 2016
- Lamar Hunt U.S. Open Cup (2): 2010, 2011

Al Rayyan SC

- Emir of Qatar Cup (1): 2013
