= Mike Seamon =

American soccer player (born 1988)

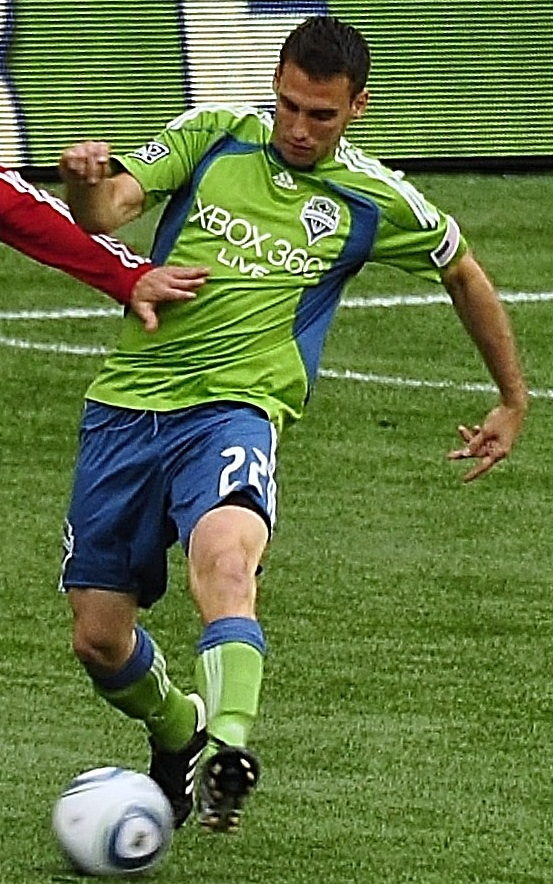

Personal information
- Full name: Michael Seamon
- Date of birth: August 30, 1988 (age 38)
- Place of birth: Rahway, New Jersey, United States
- Height: 6 ft 1 in (1.85 m)
- Position: Midfielder

College career
Years	Team	Apps	(Gls)
2006–2009	Villanova Wildcats	73	(20)

Senior career*
Years	Team	Apps	(Gls)
2010–2012	Seattle Sounders FC	9	(0)
2013	Pittsburgh Riverhounds	16	(0)
- * Club domestic league appearances and goals as of October 17, 2013

Mike Seamon (August 30, 1988 in Rahway, New Jersey) is an American soccer player.

== Career ==
=== College ===
Seamon was born in New Jersey and attended Union Catholic Regional High School.

He played four years of college soccer at Villanova University. His freshman year, he led his team with 5 assists. In his second season with the Wildcats, he was named the Philadelphia Soccer Seven Player of the Year and was also awarded second team All-Big East. During his Junior year of college, he was voted third team ALL-BIG EAST and scored 4 goals and made 4 assists.

=== Professional ===
Seamon was drafted in the second round (27th overall) of the 2010 MLS SuperDraft by Seattle Sounders FC.

On June 2, 2010, it was announced that he had been signed by Seattle Sounders FC. He made his professional debut on June 27, in a 3-1 road defeat against the Philadelphia Union.

Seamon remained with Seattle through the 2012 season. After the conclusion of the 2012 season, the club declined the 2013 option on Seamon's contract and he entered the 2012 MLS Re-Entry Draft. Seamon became a free agent after he went undrafted in both rounds of the draft.

It was announced on 13 February 2013 that Seamon signed for the Pittsburgh Riverhounds. Seamon made his first appearance for the club as a starter during the Riverhounds' opening match of the season against the Richmond Kickers on April 6, 2013.

== Honors ==
=== Seattle Sounders FC ===
- Lamar Hunt U.S. Open Cup (2): 2010, 2011

== Personal ==
Mike's sister, Katie Seamon, was on Season 17 of CBS's The Amazing Race with partner Rachel. They were the 4th team eliminated from the race.

== Career statistics ==
Club performance			League		Cup		League Cup		Continental		Total	
Season	Club	League	Apps	Goals	Apps	Goals	Apps	Goals	Apps	Goals	Apps	Goals
USA			League		Open Cup		League Cup		North America		Total	
2010	Seattle Sounders FC	Major League Soccer	8	0	3	0	0	0	7	0	18	0
2011	Seattle Sounders FC	Major League Soccer	0	0	1	0	0	0	0	0	1	0
2012	Seattle Sounders FC	Major League Soccer	1	0	0	0	0	0	0	0	1	0
2013	Pittsburgh Riverhounds	USL Pro	5	0	0	0	0	0	0	0	0	0
Total	USA		9	0	4	0	0	0	7	0	20	0
Career total			14	0	4	0	0	0	7	0	25	0

Statistics accurate as of August 18, 2012.
