= 2013 Seattle Sounders FC season =

American soccer team season

Seattle Sounders FC
2013 season
- General manager: Adrian Hanauer
- Manager: Sigi Schmid
- Stadium: CenturyLink Field
- Major League Soccer: Conference: 4th Overall: 6th
- MLS Cup playoffs: Conference semifinals
- U.S. Open Cup: Third round
- CONCACAF Champions League (2012–13): Semifinals
- Top goalscorer: League: Eddie Johnson (9); All: Eddie Johnson (12)
- Highest home attendance: 67,385 (Aug. 25 vs. Portland)
- Lowest home attendance: 20,520 (Mar. 12 vs. Tigres, CCL)
- Average home league attendance: League: 44,038; Playoffs: 35,355; All: 40,997
- Biggest win: League: 4–0 vs. San Jose (May 11)
- Biggest defeat: League: 0–4 at LA Galaxy (May 26); 1–5 at Colorado (Oct. 5)
Home colors	Away colors	Third colors

The 2013 Seattle Sounders FC season was the club's fifth season in Major League Soccer, the United States' top-tier of professional soccer. For the Sounders FC organization, it was their fifth year of existence, and including all previous clubs, it was the 33rd season of soccer in Seattle.

== Players ==
=== Squad information ===
Major League Soccer team are limited to seven players without U.S. citizenship, a permanent resident (green card holder), or the holder of other special status (e.g., refugee or asylum status). Note: Flags indicate national team as defined under FIFA eligibility rules; some limited exceptions apply. Players may hold more than one non-FIFA nationality. Squad correct as of November 19, 2013.

No.	Pos.	Nation	Player
1	GK	AUT	Michael Gspurning
2	FW	USA	Clint Dempsey (DP)
3	MF	USA	Brad Evans
4	DF	USA	Patrick Ianni
6	MF	CUB	Osvaldo Alonso
7	FW	USA	Eddie Johnson
8	DF	USA	Marc Burch
9	FW	NGR	Obafemi Martins (DP)
10	MF	ARG	Mauro Rosales (DP / Captain)
11	MF	COD	Steve Zakuani
12	DF	CRC	Leonardo González
14	MF	USA	Alex Caskey
15	MF	USA	Blair Gavin
16	FW	USA	David Estrada
17	DF	USA	DeAndre Yedlin (HGP)
19	DF	MLI	Djimi Traoré
20	DF	USA	Zach Scott
21	MF	GRN	Shalrie Joseph
22	FW	USA	Eriq Zavaleta (GA)
24	GK	USA	Marcus Hahnemann
25	MF	ENG	Andy Rose
26	MF	SCO	Adam Moffat
27	MF	USA	Lamar Neagle
28	FW	USA	Will Bates
29	GK	USA	Josh Ford
32	MF	DEN	Philip Lund
33	DF	USA	Dylan Remick
34	DF	COL	Jhon Kennedy Hurtado

=== Out on loan ===
No.	Position	Nation	Player
—	FW	COL	Fredy Montero (DP / on loan to Sporting Clube de Portugal)

=== Transfer summary ===
Seattle finished its 2012 season by releasing Mike Seamon and Andrew Weber on December 4. Three days later, the club traded Jeff Parke to the Philadelphia Union in exchange for the fifth pick in the 2013 MLS Supplemental Draft.

=== In ===
Date	Player	Number	Position	Previous club	Fee/notes	Ref
January 11, 2013	(United States) DeAndre Yedlin	17	DF	(United States) Seattle Sounders FC U-23 (United States) Akron Zips	Signed as first Home Grown Player	
January 27, 2013	(United States) Lamar Neagle	27	MF	(Canada) Montreal Impact	Acquired in exchange for an international roster spot	
February 19, 2013	(Grenada) Shalrie Joseph	21	MF	(United States) Chivas USA	Also acquired the #3 Allocation ranking, 2014 MLS SuperDraft 2nd Round Pick & 2015 MLS SuperDraft 2nd Round Pick in exchange for the #15 Allocation ranking	
February 23, 2013	(Mali) Djimi Traoré	19	DF	None	Free, unattached	
March 15, 2013	(Nigeria) Obafemi Martins	9	FW	(Spain) Levante	Undisclosed (~$4M buyout clause)	
March 22, 2013	(Jamaica) Ashani Fairclough	31	DF	(United States) USF Bulls	Free, unattached	
March 22, 2013	(Denmark) Philip Lund	32	MF	(Denmark) FC Fyn	Undisclosed	
May 10, 2013	(Guam) Doug Herrick	38	GK	(United States) Seattle Sounders FC U-23	MLS Reserve Goalkeeper Pool, signed due to Josh Ford injury	
August 3, 2013	(United States) Clint Dempsey	2	FW	(England) Tottenham Hotspur	Undisclosed (~$9M)	
August 21, 2013	(United States) Blair Gavin	15	MF	None	Free, unattached	
September 13, 2013	(Scotland) Adam Moffat	26	MF	(United States) Houston Dynamo	Acquired in exchange for Servando Carrasco & 2014 MLS SuperDraft 2nd Round Pick	

==== Loan in ====
Date from	Date to	Player	Number	Position	Previous club	Fee/notes	Ref
August 1, 2012	June 30, 2013	(Honduras) Mario Martínez	15	MF	(Honduras) Real España	One year loan deal	
July 10, 2012	September 5, 2013	(United States) Andrew Weber	37	GK	(United States) Phoenix FC	Loan deal	

==== Draft picks ====
Date	Player	Number	Position	Previous club	Fee/notes	Ref
January 17, 2013	(United States) Eriq Zavaleta	22	FW	(United States) Indiana Hoosiers	MLS SuperDraft 1st Round Pick (#10), Generation Adidas	
January 17, 2013	(United States) Dylan Remick	33	DF	(United States) Worcester Hydra (United States) Brown Bears	MLS SuperDraft 2nd Round Pick (#35)	
January 22, 2013	(United States) Will Bates	28	FW	(United States) Richmond Strikers (United States) Virginia Cavaliers	MLS Supplemental 1st round pick (#5)	

===== On trial (in) =====
Date from	Date to	Player	Number	Position	Previous club	Fee/notes	Ref
January 21, 2013	January 28, 2013	(Costa Rica) Marvin Angulo		MF	(Costa Rica) Herediano	Preseason camp	
January 21, 2013	January 28, 2013	(Panama) Manuel Asprilla		MF	(Mexico) Tigres UANL	Preseason camp	
January 21, 2013	March 15, 2013	(United States) Travis Bowen	43	FW	(United States) Ventura County Fusion	Preseason camp	
January 21, 2013	January 28, 2013	(United States) José Cuevas	49	MF	(United States) Charleston Battery	Preseason camp	
January 21, 2013	January 28, 2013	(United States) Justin Davis	50	MF	(United States) Minnesota Stars FC	Preseason camp	
January 21, 2013	January 28, 2013	(United States) Cody Ellison		DF	(United States) Charleston Battery	Preseason camp	
January 21, 2013	February 8, 2013	(Cameroon) Guy Essame		MF	None	Preseason camp, spend last season with (Russia) FC Terek Grozny	
January 21, 2013	April 29, 2013	(Guam) Doug Herrick	38	GK	(United States) Sounders FC U-23	Preseason camp	
January 21, 2013	January 28, 2013	(United States) Ross LaBauex	47	MF	None	Preseason camp, spend last season with the Colorado Rapids	
January 21, 2013	January 28, 2013	(Ghana) David Opoku		FW	None	Preseason camp, spend last season with (Finland) MYPA	
January 21, 2013	March 22, 2013	(Denmark) Philip Lund	41	MF	(Denmark) FC Fyn	Preseason camp	
January 21, 2013	January 28, 2013	(Denmark) Jonas Rasmussen		MF	(Denmark) Hvidovre IF	Preseason camp	
January 21, 2013	January 28, 2013	(United States) Isaiah Schafer		FW	(United States) Real Colorado Foxes	Preseason camp	
January 24, 2013	March 22, 2013	(Jamaica) Ashani Fairclough	47	DF	None	Preseason camp, spend last season with the South Florida Bulls	
January 30, 2013	February 8, 2013	(Canada) Mason Trafford		DF	None	Preseason camp, spend last season with the (Finland) IFK Mariehamn	
February 2, 2013	February 10, 2013	(Jamaica) Shavar Thomas	54	DF	None	Preseason camp, spend last season with the Montreal Impact	
February 5, 2013	February 10, 2013	(Brazil) Léo Lelis		DF	(Brazil) Fluminense	Preseason camp	
February 5, 2013	February 23, 2013	(Mali) Djimi Traoré	50	DF	None	Preseason camp, spend last season with (France) Olympique de Marseille	
February 8, 2013	February 9, 2013	(Grenada) Shalrie Joseph	48	MF	(United States) Chivas USA	Preseason camp	
February 10, 2013	February 14, 2013	(France) Mikaël Silvestre	53	DF	None	Preseason camp, spend last season with (Germany) Werder Bremen, the right traded to Portland Timbers in exchange for two draft picks	
February 21, 2013	March 15, 2013	(Ghana) Stephen Okai		MF	(United States) Philadelphia Union	Preseason camp	
April 15, 2013	April 29, 2013	(Costa Rica) Josué Martínez		MF	None	Spend part of season with the New York Red Bulls, played for Sounders Reserves (April)	
June 26, 2013	July 2, 2013	(Panama) Roberto Chen	43	DF	(Panama) San Francisco	Centre back	
June 27, 2013	June 30, 2013	(United States) Neal Kitson		GK	(United States) Jersey Express		
July 16, 2013	September 6, 2013	(United States) Bryan Meredith	37	GK	(Sweden) IK Brage		
July 21, 2013	July 21, 2013	(United States) Sean Cunningham		DF	(Norway) Molde	Played for Sounders Reserves (July)	
July 21, 2013	July 21, 2013	(United States) Seth Moses		DF	(Liechtenstein) USV Eschen/Mauren	Played for Sounders Reserves (July)	
July 23, 2013	July 29, 2013	(Jamaica) Ashani Fairclough		DF	None	Spend part of season with the team, played for Sounders Reserves (July)	
July 26, 2013	July 27, 2013	(El Salvador) Derby Carrillo		GK	(El Salvador) Santa Tecla F.C.		
July 26, 2013	August 21, 2013	(United States) Blair Gavin		MF	(United States) IMG Academy Bradenton	Played for Sounders Reserves (July–August)	
July 29, 2013	July 29, 2013	(France) Youssef Adnane		FW	(France) Évian Thonon Gaillard FC	Played for Sounders Reserves (July)	
September 14, 2013	September 14, 2013	(Senegal) Leyti N'Diaye	45	DF	(France) Olympique de Marseille	Played for Sounders Reserves (September)	
September 14, 2013	September 14, 2013	(Netherlands) Vincent Weijl	41	MF	(Netherlands) SC Cambuur	Played for Sounders Reserves (September)	
October 14, 2013	October 14, 2013	(Uganda) Michael Azira		MF	(United States) Charleston Battery	Played for Sounders Reserves (October)	
October 14, 2013	October 14, 2013	(China) Long Tan		FW	(United States) Orlando City	Played for Sounders Reserves (October)	

=== Out ===
Date	Player	Number	Position	Destination club	Fee/notes	Ref
December 3, 2012	(United States) Mike Seamon	22	MF	(United States) Pittsburgh Riverhounds	Contract Option Declined, 2012 MLS Re-Entry Draft: Not selected	
December 3, 2012	(United States) Andrew Weber	33	GK	(United States) Phoenix FC	Contract Option Declined, 2012 MLS Re-Entry Draft: Not selected	
December 3, 2012	(Jamaica) O'Brian White	-	FW	None	Contract Option Declined, 2012 MLS Re-Entry Draft: Withdrew prior to draft	
December 7, 2012	(United States) Jeff Parke	31	DF	(United States) Philadelphia Union	Traded in exchange for allocation money & 2013 MLS Supplemental Draft 1st round pick	
December 14, 2012	(Trinidad and Tobago) Cordell Cato	21	FW	(United States) San Jose Earthquakes	Contract Option Declined, traded in exchange for 2014 MLS Supplemental 4th round pick	
December 14, 2012	(United States) Bryan Meredith	35	GK	(Sweden) IK Brage	Contract Option Declined	
December 14, 2012	(United States) Daniel Steres	32	DF	(United States) Wilmington Hammerheads	Contract Option Declined	
December 14, 2012	(Ghana) Michael Tetteh	14	MF	None	Contract Option Declined	
February 26, 2013	(Canada) Babayele Sodade	19	FW	None	Waived	
March 2, 2013	(Germany) Christian Tiffert	13	MF	(Germany) VfL Bochum	Parted ways, bought out the contract	
March 19, 2013	(Sweden) Adam Johansson	5	DF	(Sweden) IFK Göteborg	Waived	
April 19, 2013	(United States) Andrew Duran	30	DF	None	Waived	
June 27, 2013	(Jamaica) Ashani Fairclough	31	DF	None	Waived	
July 24, 2013	(United States) Sammy Ochoa	26	FW	(Mexico) Lobos de la BUAP	Waived	
September 13, 2013	(United States) Servando Carrasco	23	MF	(United States) Houston Dynamo	Traded in exchange for Adam Moffat	

==== Loan out ====
Date from	Date to	Player	Number	Position	Destination club	Fee/notes	Ref
January 21, 2013	July 22, 2013	(Colombia) Fredy Montero		FW	(Colombia) Millonarios	End of season loan deal	
May 10, 2013	May 10, 2013	(United States) Will Bates	28	FW	(United States) Phoenix FC	One match loan deal	
June 10, 2013	July 4, 2013	(United States) Eriq Zavaleta	22	FW	(United States) San Antonio Scorpions		
July 22, 2013	June 30, 2014	(Colombia) Fredy Montero		FW	Sporting Clube de Portugal	Loan deal with option to buy	
December 23, 2013		(United States) Clint Dempsey	2	MF	(England) Fulham FC		

==== Unsigned draft picks ====
Date	Player	Number	Position	Previous club	Destination club	Fee/notes	Ref
February 8, 2013	(United States) Kevin Olali		MF	(United States) South Florida Bulls	None	MLS Supplemental 2nd round pick (#35), preseason camp	
February 10, 2013	(South Africa) Lebogang Moloto		MF	(United States) Lindsey Wilson C. Blue Raiders	(United States) Lindsey Wilson C. Blue Raiders	MLS Supplemental 3rd round pick (#54), preseason camp	
February 26, 2013	(United States) Kevin Durr	42	MF	(United States) Air Force Falcons	(United States) Air Force Falcons	MLS Supplemental 1st round pick (#16), preseason camp	
February 26, 2013	(United States) Jennings Rex	46	MF	(United States) Charlotte 49ers	None	MLS Supplemental 4th round pick (#73), preseason camp	

===== On trial (out) =====
Date from	Date to	Player	Number	Position	Destination club	Fee/notes	Ref
December 17, 2012	December 22, 2012	(Cuba) Osvaldo Alonso	6	MF	(England) West Ham	One-week training session	

=== Board and staff ===
Position	Staff	Nation
Head coach	Sigi Schmid	United States
Assistant coach	Brian Schmetzer	United States
Assistant coach/Reserve Team Head Coach	Ezra Hendrickson	Saint Vincent and the Grenadines
Goalkeepers Coach	Tom Dutra	United States
Fitness coach	David Tenney	United States
Assistant coach and Scout	Kurt Schmid	United States
Sporting director	Chris Henderson	United States

Source: Coaching staff

Position/Title	Name
Majority Owner	Joe Roth
Owner & General Manager	Adrian Hanauer
Owner & Founder and Chairman, Vulcan Inc.	Paul Allen
Owner	Drew Carey
President & CEO, Vulcan Inc.	Jo Lynn Allen
President	Peter McLoughlin
Director of Business Operations	Bart Wiley
Director of Finance	Skye Henderson
Senior Marketing Manager	Heidi Dettmer
Communication Manager	Mike Ferris
Director of Youth Development/U-23 Team Head Coach	Darren Sawatzky
Team Administrative Director	Vince Johnson
Medical Director	Dr. Michael Morris
Head Athletic Trainer	Randy Noteboom
Equipment Manager	Nolan Myer
Chiropractors	Lew Estabrook
Voice of the Sounders FC	Ross Fletcher, Kasey Keller

Source: Staff

=== Facilities ===
Ground (capacity and dimensions)	CenturyLink Field (67,000 / 104x68m)
Training ground (capacity and dimensions)	Starfire Sports Complex (4,500 / 101x64m)

Source: Facilities

== Season overview ==
=== Preseason ===
On October 11, during the tail end of the 2012 regular season campaign, it was announced that Seattle Sounders FC would be participating in the 2013 Desert Diamond Cup with the dates of the matches announced.

== Match results ==
Win Tie Loss

=== Preseason ===
==== The Desert Friendlies presented by FC Tucson ====
February 5, 2013	Seattle Sounders FC	0–1	Portland Timbers	Tucson, Arizona
09:30 PDT	Carrasco (yellow card) 8'; Moloto (yellow card) 17'	Report	Miller (yellow card) 38'; Dike (yellow card) 39'; Silvestre 61'	Stadium: Kino Stadium; Referee: Jair Marrufo

==== Desert Diamond Cup ====
===== Table standings =====
Pos	Team	Pld	W	L	D	GF	GA	GD	Pts
1	Seattle Sounders FC	3	3	0	0	6	1	+5	9
2	Real Salt Lake	3	1	1	1	6	6	0	4
3	New England Revolution	3	1	2	0	5	6	−1	3
4	New York Red Bulls	3	0	2	1	3	7	−4	1

===== Group stage =====
February 13, 2013 Group stage: Match 1	New England Revolution	0–2	Seattle Sounders FC	Tucson, Arizona
16:00 PDT	Gonçalves (yellow card) 25'; Nyassi (red card) 79'	Report	González (yellow card) 18'; Johnson (yellow card) 25', (goal) 45'; Evans 27' (pen.); Alonso (yellow card) 32'; Traoré (yellow card) 43'; Burch (red card) 79'; Bowen (yellow card) 82'	Stadium: Kino Stadium; Referee: Juan Guzman

February 16, 2013 Group stage: Match 2	Seattle Sounders FC	2–1	Real Salt Lake	Tucson, Arizona
15:00 PDT	Martínez 66'; Lund 71'	Report	Schuler (yellow card) 20'; Mansally (yellow card) 34'; Stertzer 86'	Stadium: Kino Stadium; Referee: Allen Chapman

February 20, 2013 Group stage: Match 3	Seattle Sounders FC	2–0	New York Red Bulls	Tucson, Arizona
18:00 PDT	Zavaleta (yellow card) 4'; Caskey 36'; Martínez 78'	Report		Stadium: Kino Stadium

===== Final =====
February 23, 2013 Final	Seattle Sounders FC	1–0	Real Salt Lake	Tucson, Arizona
17:00 PDT	Caskey 51'; Fairclough (yellow card) 66'	Report		Stadium: Kino Stadium; Attendance: 4,528; Referee: Jair Marrufo

==== Other preseason games ====
February 22, 2013	Seattle Sounders FC	0–0	Veracruz	Tucson, Arizona
18:00 PDT	Scott (yellow card) 81'	Report	Rico (red card) 15'	Stadium: Kino Stadium; Attendance: 1,200

=== Competitions ===
==== Overview ====
Competition	Started round	Current position / round	Final position / round	First match	Last match
Major League Soccer	—	—	C:4th / O:6th	March 2, 2013	October 27, 2013
MLS Cup Playoffs	Knockout round	—	Conference semifinals	October 30, 2013	November 7, 2013
2012–13 CONCACAF Champions League	Quarterfinals	—	Semifinal	March 6, 2013	April 9, 2013
U.S. Open Cup	Third round	—	Third round	May 29, 2013	May 29, 2013

Updated to match played November 7, 2013
Source: Competitions

=== CONCACAF Champions League ===
==== 2012–13 edition ====
===== Quarterfinals =====
March 6, 2013 First leg	Tigres UANL (Mexico)	1–0	(United States) Seattle Sounders FC	San Nicolás de los Garza, Nuevo León, Mexico
19:00 PDT	Pulido 74'	Report		Stadium: Estadio Universitario; Attendance: 32,810; Referee: Jeffrey Solís (Costa Rica)

March 12, 2013 Second leg	Seattle Sounders FC (United States)	3–1 (3–2 agg.)	(Mexico) Tigres UANL	Seattle
19:00 PDT	Johnson (yellow card) 13', (goal) 75'; Alonso (yellow card) 47'; Yedlin 53'; Traoré 60'; Gspurning (yellow card) 86'	Report	Hernández 23', (yellow card) 81'; Díaz de León (yellow card) 35'; Viniegra (yellow card) 37' (yellow-red card) 45'	Stadium: CenturyLink Field; Attendance: 20,520; Referee: Elmer Bonilla (El Salvador)

===== Semifinals =====
April 2, 2013 First leg	Seattle Sounders FC (United States)	0–1	(Mexico) Santos Laguna	Seattle
19:00 PDT		Report	Rodríguez (yellow card) 18'; Gómez 54'	Stadium: CenturyLink Field; Attendance: 21,057; Referee: Héctor Rodríguez (Honduras)

April 9, 2013 Second leg	Santos Laguna (Mexico)	1–1 (2–1 agg.)	(United States) Seattle Sounders FC	Torreón, Mexico
17:00 PDT	Quintero 20'	Report	Scott (yellow card) 19'; Rosales (yellow card) 66'; Neagle 73'	Stadium: Estadio TSM Corona; Attendance: 19,595; Referee: Joel Aguilar (El Salvador)

=== MLS regular season ===
==== Standings ====
===== Western Conference =====
Pos	Team	Pld	W	L	T	GF	GA	GD	Pts	Qualification
1	Portland Timbers	34	14	5	15	54	33	+21	57	Qualification for the conference semifinals
2	Real Salt Lake	34	16	10	8	57	41	+16	56	Qualification for the conference semifinals
3	LA Galaxy	34	15	11	8	53	38	+15	53	Qualification for the conference semifinals
4	Seattle Sounders FC	34	15	12	7	42	42	0	52	Qualification for the knockout round
5	Colorado Rapids	34	14	11	9	45	38	+7	51	Qualification for the knockout round
6	San Jose Earthquakes	34	14	11	9	35	42	−7	51	
7	Vancouver Whitecaps FC	34	13	12	9	53	45	+8	48	
8	FC Dallas	34	11	12	11	48	52	−4	44	
9	Chivas USA	34	6	20	8	30	67	−37	26	

Source: MLS

===== Overall table =====
Note: the table below has no impact on playoff qualification and is used solely for determining host of the MLS Cup, certain CCL spots, and 2014 MLS draft. The conference tables are the sole determinant for teams qualifying to the playoffs

Pos	Team	Pld	W	L	T	GF	GA	GD	Pts	
1	New York Red Bulls (S)	34	17	9	8	58	41	+17	59	Qualification for the CONCACAF Champions League
2	Sporting Kansas City (C)	34	17	10	7	47	30	+17	58	Qualification for the CONCACAF Champions League
3	Portland Timbers	34	14	5	15	54	33	+21	57	Qualification for the CONCACAF Champions League
4	Real Salt Lake	34	16	10	8	57	41	+16	56	
5	LA Galaxy	34	15	11	8	53	38	+15	53	
6	Seattle Sounders FC	34	15	12	7	42	42	0	52	
7	New England Revolution	34	14	11	9	49	38	+11	51	
8	Colorado Rapids	34	14	11	9	45	38	+7	51	
9	Houston Dynamo	34	14	11	9	41	41	0	51	
10	San Jose Earthquakes	34	14	11	9	35	42	−7	51	
11	Montreal Impact (V)	34	14	13	7	50	49	+1	49	Qualification for the CONCACAF Champions League
12	Chicago Fire	34	14	13	7	47	52	−5	49	
13	Vancouver Whitecaps FC	34	13	12	9	53	45	+8	48	
14	Philadelphia Union	34	12	12	10	42	44	−2	46	
15	FC Dallas	34	11	12	11	48	52	−4	44	
16	Columbus Crew	34	12	17	5	42	46	−4	41	
17	Toronto FC	34	6	17	11	30	47	−17	29	
18	Chivas USA	34	6	20	8	30	67	−37	26	
19	D.C. United (U)	34	3	24	7	22	59	−37	16	Qualification for the CONCACAF Champions League

Source: MLS
Rules for classification: 1) points; 2) head-to-head record; 3) goal difference; 4) number of goals scored
(C) MLS Cup champions; (S) Supporters' Shield winners; (U) U.S. Open Cup winners; (V) Canadian Championship winners

==== Results summary ====
Overall								Home						Away					
Pld	Pts	W	L	T	GF	GA	GD	W	L	T	GF	GA	GD	W	L	T	GF	GA	GD
34	52	15	12	7	42	42	0	10	2	5	29	15	+14	5	10	2	13	27	−14

Last updated: October 27, 2013
Source: MLS Results
Pld = Matches played; Pts = Points; W = Matches won; T = Matches tied; L = Matches lost; GF = Goals for; GA = Goals against; GD = Goal difference

==== Results by round ====
Round	1	2	3	4	5	6	7	8	9	10	11	12	13	14	15	16	17	18	19	20	21	22	23	24	25	26	27	28	29	30	31	32	33	34
Stadium	H	H	A	A	H	A	A	A	H	H	A	A	H	A	H	A	A	H	H	H	A	A	H	A	H	H	H	A	H	A	H	A	A	H
Result	L	D	L	L	D	W	D	W	W	W	L	W	W	L	W	L	L	D	W	W	W	L	W	W	W	W	W	D	D	L	L	L	L	D

Updated to match(es) played on October 27, 2013. Source: MLS Results
A = Away; H = Home; W = Win; D = Draw; L = Loss

==== Match results ====
Win Tie Loss

March 2, 2013 Match 1	Seattle Sounders FC	0–1	Montreal Impact	Seattle
19:30 PDT	Evans (yellow card) 17'	Report	Arnaud 35'; Pisanu (yellow card) 64'	Stadium: CenturyLink Field; Attendance: 38,998; Referee: Silviu Petrescu

March 16, 2013 Match 2 Cascadia Cup	Seattle Sounders FC	1–1	Portland Timbers	Seattle
17:00 PDT	Johnson 13', (yellow card) 82'; Alonso (yellow card) 43'; Hurtado (yellow card) 73'	Report	Jean-Baptiste (yellow card) 16'; W. Johnson (yellow card) 50'; Wallace 90'	Stadium: CenturyLink Field; Attendance: 40,150; Referee: Kevin Stott

March 23, 2013 Match 3	San Jose Earthquakes	1–0	Seattle Sounders FC	Santa Clara, California
19:30 PDT	Wondolowski 45+1'	Report		Stadium: Buck Shaw Stadium; Attendance: 10,525; Referee: Baldomero Toledo

March 30, 2013 Match 4	Real Salt Lake	2–1	Seattle Sounders FC	Sandy, Utah
18:00 PDT	Findley 8'; Gil 35'	Report	Evans 57'; Rose (yellow card) 87'	Stadium: Rio Tinto Stadium; Attendance: 20,359; Referee: Mark Geiger

April 13, 2013 Match 5	Seattle Sounders FC	0–0	New England Revolution	Seattle
13:00 PDT		Report		Stadium: CenturyLink Field; Attendance: 38,323; Referee: Chris Penso

April 20, 2013 Match 6	Colorado Rapids	0–1	Seattle Sounders FC	Commerce City, Colorado
15:00 PDT	Powers (yellow card) 41'	Report	Martins 27'; Traoré (yellow card) 67'; González (yellow card) 84'	Stadium: Dick's Sporting Goods Park; Attendance: 12,063; Referee: Silviu Petrescu

May 4, 2013 Match 7	Philadelphia Union	2–2	Seattle Sounders FC	Chester, Pennsylvania
13:00 PDT	M. Farfan (yellow card) 43'; Cruz 50', 51'; G. Farfan (yellow card) 81'; Williams (red card) 84'	Report	Johnson 10', (yellow card) 90+2'; Rosales 64'; Neagle (red card) 84'; Yedlin (red card) 90+1'	Stadium: PPL Park; Attendance: 18,344; Referee: Jorge Gonzalez

May 8, 2013 Match 8	Sporting Kansas City	0–1	Seattle Sounders FC	Kansas City, Kansas
17:30 PDT	Opara (yellow card) 45'; Collin (yellow card) 90+1'	Report	Hahnemann (red card) 24' (from bench); Traoré 90+4'	Stadium: Livestrong Sporting Park; Attendance: 18,602; Referee: Geoff Gamble

May 11, 2013 Match 9 Heritage Cup	Seattle Sounders FC	4–0	San Jose Earthquakes	Seattle
13:00 PDT	Neagle 28', 54'; Rosales 45+1'; Johnson (yellow card) 88'; Martins 90+3'	Report	Baca (yellow card) 45'; Wondolowski (yellow card) 88'	Stadium: CenturyLink Field; Attendance: 38,880; Referee: Jair Marrufo

May 18, 2013 Match 10	Seattle Sounders FC	4–2	FC Dallas	Seattle
19:30 PDT	Johnson 16', 62'; Neagle 31'; Martins 83'; Yedlin (yellow card) 87'	Report	Woodberry (yellow card) 43'; Cooper 53'; Michel 61'; Pérez (red card) 73'	Stadium: CenturyLink Field; Attendance: 38,979; Referee: Mark Geiger

May 26, 2013 Match 11	Los Angeles Galaxy	4–0	Seattle Sounders FC	Carson, California
20:00 PDT	Franklin 12'; Keane 24', 34' (pen.), 44' (pen.); Zardes (yellow card) 40'; Gonzalez (yellow card) 70'	Report	Evans (yellow card) 43'; Johnson (yellow card) 65'; Joseph (red card) 87'	Stadium: Home Depot Center; Attendance: 24,811; Referee: Baldomero Toledo

June 1, 2013 Match 12	Chivas USA	0–2	Seattle Sounders FC	Carson, California
19:30 PDT	Farfan (yellow card) 75'	Report	Martins 22', (red card) 71' (red card later rescinded) de Luna 33' (o.g.); Rosales (yellow card) 36'	Stadium: StubHub Center; Attendance: 9,053; Referee: Ricardo Salazar

June 8, 2013 Match 13 Cascadia Cup	Seattle Sounders FC	3–2	Vancouver Whitecaps FC	Seattle
19:30 PDT	Rose 9', (yellow card) 52'; Carrasco 70' (pen.); Neagle 81'	Report	Camilo 10', 26'; Harvey (yellow card) 86'	Stadium: CenturyLink Field; Attendance: 53,679; Referee: Hilario Grajeda

June 22, 2013 Match 14	Real Salt Lake	2–0	Seattle Sounders FC	Sandy, Utah
18:30 PDT	Wingert (yellow card) 24'; Beckerman 41', (yellow card) 59'; Findley 46'	Report	González (yellow card) 61'; Traoré (yellow card) 74'	Stadium: Rio Tinto Stadium; Attendance: 19,848; Referee: Armando Villareal

July 3, 2013 Match 15	Seattle Sounders FC	2–0	D.C. United	Seattle
19:00 PDT	Martins 19', 90+1'; Scott (yellow card) 67'; Hurtado (yellow card) 74'	Report	Rochat (yellow card) 47'	Stadium: CenturyLink Field; Attendance: 39,180; Referee: Allen Chapman

July 6, 2013 Match 16 Cascadia Cup	Vancouver Whitecaps FC	2–0	Seattle Sounders FC	Vancouver
20:00 PDT	Miller 4'; Mattocks 79'	Report	Neagle (yellow card) 61'; Hurtado (yellow card) 90'	Stadium: BC Place; Attendance: 22,500; Referee: Hilario Grajeda

July 13, 2013 Match 17 Heritage Cup	San Jose Earthquakes	1–0	Seattle Sounders FC	Santa Clara, California
19:30 PDT	Lenhart (yellow card) 15'; Cronin (yellow card) 22'; Martínez 48'; Gordon (yellow card) 80'	Report	Scott (yellow card) 25'; Carrasco (yellow card) 42'; Hurtado (yellow card) 85'; Alonso (red card) 90+4' (red card later rescinded)	Stadium: Buck Shaw Stadium; Attendance: 10,525; Referee: Sorin Stoica

July 20, 2013 Match 18	Seattle Sounders FC	1–1	Colorado Rapids	Seattle
13:00 PDT	Scott (yellow card) 42'; Carrasco (yellow card) 43'; Yedlin 65'	Report	Moor 60'; Sturgis (yellow card) 83'	Stadium: CenturyLink Field; Attendance: 39,196; Referee: Ismail Elfath

July 28, 2013 Match 19	Seattle Sounders FC	2–1	Chivas USA	Seattle
20:00 PDT	Traoré (yellow card) 14'; Evans 23'; Neagle 57'; Ianni (yellow card) 71'	Report	Torres 16'; Bowen (yellow card) 69'	Stadium: CenturyLink Field; Attendance: 38,463; Referee: Kevin Stott

August 3, 2013 Match 20	Seattle Sounders FC	3–0	FC Dallas	Seattle
19:30 PDT	Martins 8'; Johnson 22', (yellow card) 90+2'; Traoré (yellow card) 54'; Alonso (yellow card) 69'; Evans 90+4' (pen.)	Report	Pérez (yellow card) 65'; John (yellow card) 84'	Stadium: CenturyLink Field; Attendance: 39,360; Referee: Edvin Jurisevic

August 10, 2013 Match 21	Toronto FC	1–2	Seattle Sounders FC	Toronto
16:00 PDT	Osorio 46'	Report	Rosales 16'; Johnson (yellow card) 23'; Henry 40' (o.g.); Joseph (yellow card) 75'	Stadium: BMO Field; Attendance: 18,766; Referee: Mark Geiger

August 17, 2013 Match 22	Houston Dynamo	3–1	Seattle Sounders FC	Houston
18:00 PDT	Barnes 17', 21'; Bruin 74'; Moffat (yellow card) 83'	Report	González (yellow card) 42'; Joseph 65'	Stadium: BBVA Compass Stadium; Attendance: 22,289; Referee: Baldomero Toledo

August 25, 2013 Match 23 Cascadia Cup	Seattle Sounders FC	1–0	Portland Timbers	Seattle
19:00 PDT	Johnson 60'	Report	Kah (yellow card) 59'	Stadium: CenturyLink Field; Attendance: 67,385; Referee: Jair Marrufo

August 31, 2013 Match 24	Columbus Crew	0–1	Seattle Sounders FC	Columbus, Ohio
16:30 PDT	O'Rourke (yellow card) 21'; Viana (yellow card) 36'	Report	González (red card) 7'; Johnson 14'; Traoré (yellow card) 76'	Stadium: Columbus Crew Stadium; Attendance: 20,392; Referee: Ismail Elfath

September 4, 2013 Match 25	Seattle Sounders FC	1–0	Chivas USA	Seattle
19:00 PDT	Neagle 24'	Report	de Luna (yellow card) 34'; Minda (yellow card) 64'	Stadium: CenturyLink Field; Attendance: 38,317; Referee: Mark Geiger

September 7, 2013 Match 26	Seattle Sounders FC	2–1	Chicago Fire	Seattle
19:00 PDT	Neagle 40'; Rosales (yellow card) 48'; González (yellow card) 70'; Segares 89' (o.g.)	Report	Magee 25'; Soumaré (yellow card) 29'; Duka (yellow card) 41'; Paladini (yellow card) 87'	Stadium: CenturyLink Field; Attendance: 38,503; Referee: Hilario Grajeda

September 13, 2013 Match 27	Seattle Sounders FC	2–0	Real Salt Lake	Seattle
19:00 PDT	Martins 3'; Neagle 38'; Yedlin (yellow card) 79'	Report	Morales (yellow card) 33'; Salcedo (yellow card) 60'; Grabavoy (yellow card) 63'; García (yellow card) 70'; Stephenson (yellow card) 85'; Beckerman (yellow card) 89'	Stadium: CenturyLink Field; Attendance: 55,107; Referee: Allen Chapman

September 21, 2013 Match 28	Los Angeles Galaxy	1–1	Seattle Sounders FC	Carson, California
19:30 PDT	Juninho 45+2'	Report	Johnson 25'; Scott (yellow card) 45+1' (yellow-red card) 90'; Alonso (yellow card) 62'	Stadium: StubHub Center; Attendance: 27,000; Referee: Silviu Petrescu

September 29, 2013 Match 29	Seattle Sounders FC	1–1	New York Red Bulls	Seattle
18:00 PDT	Evans 45' (pen.), (yellow card) 54'	Report	Steele (yellow card) 64'; Cahill 76'	Stadium: CenturyLink Field; Attendance: 39,083; Referee: Kevin Stott

October 5, 2013 Match 30	Colorado Rapids	5–1	Seattle Sounders FC	Commerce City, Colorado
19:00 PDT	Brown 1', 31'; Powers 10'; Moor 41'; Torres 90+1'	Report	Scott (yellow card) 8' (yellow-red card) 79'; Johnson 63'	Stadium: Dick's Sporting Goods Park; Attendance: 18,076; Referee: Dave Gantar

October 9, 2013 Match 31 Cascadia Cup	Seattle Sounders FC	1–4	Vancouver Whitecaps FC	Seattle
19:00 PDT	Rosales 69'	Report	Manneh 12', 42', 54'; Mitchell (yellow card) 51'; Reo-Coker 82'	Stadium: CenturyLink Field; Attendance: 38,833; Referee: Juan Guzman

October 13, 2013 Match 32 Cascadia Cup	Portland Timbers	1–0	Seattle Sounders FC	Portland, Oregon
18:00 PDT	Alhassan 45', (yellow card) 45+1'	Report	Moffat (yellow card) 26'; Hurtado (yellow card) 72'; Alonso (red card) 74'	Stadium: Jeld-Wen Field; Attendance: 20,674; Referee: Hilario Grajeda

October 19, 2013 Match 33	FC Dallas	2–0	Seattle Sounders FC	Frisco, Texas
11:30 PDT	Luccin (yellow card) 14'; Hedges 65'; Jacobson (yellow card) 77'; Michel 87', (yellow card) 88'	Report		Stadium: Toyota Stadium; Attendance: 15,017; Referee: Ismail Elfath

October 27, 2013 Match 34	Seattle Sounders FC	1–1	Los Angeles Galaxy	Seattle
18:00 PDT	Dempsey 30'	Report	Keane (yellow card) 43', (goal) 78'; Marcelo (yellow card) 60'	Stadium: CenturyLink Field; Attendance: 66,216; Referee: Mark Geiger

=== MLS Cup Playoffs ===
==== Knockout round ====
October 30, 2013 Knockout round	Seattle Sounders FC	2–0	Colorado Rapids	Seattle
19:30 PDT	Evans 28'; Neagle (yellow card) 78'; Gspurning (red card) 85'; Johnson (yellow card) 89', (goal) 90+3'	Report	Thomas (yellow card) 23'; Harris (yellow card) 45+1'; Irwin (yellow card) 53'; Mera (yellow card) 79'	Stadium: CenturyLink Field; Attendance: 32,204; Referee: Silviu Petrescu

==== Conference semifinals ====
November 2, 2013 First leg	Seattle Sounders FC	1–2	Portland Timbers	Seattle
19:00 PDT	Neagle (yellow card) 47'; Alonso 90'	Report	R. Johnson 15'; Wallace (yellow card) 44'; Nagbe 66'; Zemanski (yellow card) 84'	Stadium: CenturyLink Field; Attendance: 38,507; Referee: Baldomero Toledo

November 7, 2013 Second leg	Portland Timbers	3–2 (5–3 agg.)	Seattle Sounders FC	Portland, Oregon
20:00 PDT	Kah (yellow card) 26'; W. Johnson 29' (pen.); Valeri 44'; Danso 47'; Chará (yellow card) 53'	Report	Burch (yellow card) 40'; Dempsey (yellow card) 49'; Yedlin 74'; Johnson 76'	Stadium: Jeld-Wen Field; Attendance: 20,674; Referee: Hilario Grajeda

=== U.S. Open Cup ===
May 29, 2013 Third round	Tampa Bay Rowdies	1–0	Seattle Sounders FC	St. Petersburg, Florida
16:30 PDT	Hristov 75'; Gafa (red card) 80'	Report	Caskey (yellow card) 52'; Martínez (yellow card) 90'	Stadium: Al Lang Stadium

==== Cascadia Cup ====
2013
Team	Pld	W	L	D	GF	GA	GD	Pts
Vancouver Whitecaps FC	6	2	1	3	13	9	+4	9
Portland Timbers	6	1	1	4	7	7	0	7
Seattle Sounders FC	6	2	3	1	6	10	−4	7

Source: "Cascadia Cup". cascadiacup.soccer. January 2013.

==== Heritage Cup ====
The competition began in 2009 when the expansion Seattle Sounders FC began play, becoming the second MLS team named after their NASL counterpart — the San Jose Earthquakes having been the first.

=== Squad information ===
As of November 7, 2013.

No.	Name	Nationality	Position (s)	Date of Birth (Age)	Signed From	Club Appearances (MLS) [Playoffs]	Club Goals (MLS) [Playoffs]
Goalkeepers
1	Michael Gspurning	(Austria)	GK	May 2, 1981 (age 45)	(Greece) Skoda Xanthi	63 (49) [6]	0 (0) [0]
24	Marcus Hahnemann	(United States)	GK	June 15, 1972 (age 54)	(England) Everton	9 (4) [2]	0 (0) [0]
29	Josh Ford	(United States)	GK	November 6, 1987 (age 38)	(United States) UConn	0 (0) [0]	0 (0) [0]
Defenders
4	Patrick Ianni	(United States)	CB	June 15, 1985 (age 41)	(United States) Houston	107 (83) [3]	3 (3) [0]
8	Marc Burch	(United States)	LB / LWM	May 7, 1984 (age 42)	(United States) D.C. United	66 (49) [5]	0 (0) [0]
12	Leonardo González	(Costa Rica)	LB	November 21, 1980 (age 45)	(Costa Rica) Municipal Liberia	136 (98) [8]	1 (1) [0]
17	DeAndre Yedlin	(United States)	RB	July 9, 1993 (age 33)	(United States) Akron	37 (31) [2]	3 (1) [1]
19	Djimi Traoré	(Mali)	CB / LB	March 1, 1980 (age 46)	(France) Marseille	34 (27) [3]	2 (1) [0]
20	Zach Scott	(United States)	CB / RB	July 2, 1980 (age 46)	(United States) Seattle (USL)	101 (66) [6]	3 (1) [1]
33	Dylan Remick	(United States)	RB / LB	May 19, 1991 (age 35)	(United States) Brown	2 (1) [0]	0 (0) [0]
34	Jhon Kennedy Hurtado	(Colombia)	CB	May 16, 1984 (age 42)	(Colombia) Deportivo Cali	145 (108) [11]	1 (1) [0]
Midfielders
3	Brad Evans	(United States)	CMF / RWM	May 20, 1985 (age 41)	(United States) Columbus	138 (112) [11]	22 (17) [1]
6	Osvaldo Alonso	(Cuba)	DMF / CMF	November 11, 1985 (age 40)	(United States) Charleston	184 (139) [13]	15 (6) [2]
10	Mauro Rosales (C)	(Argentina)	RWM / AMF	February 24, 1981 (age 45)	(Argentina) River Plate	101 (86) [4]	12 (12) [0]
11	Steve Zakuani	(Democratic Republic of the Congo)	LWM	February 9, 1988 (age 38)	(United States) Akron	101 (80) [7]	19 (17) [1]
14	Alex Caskey	(United States)	CMF / LWM	July 22, 1988 (age 38)	(United States) Charleston	43 (30) [1]	3 (1) [0]
15	Blair Gavin	(United States)	CMF	January 8, 1989 (age 37)	(United States) Bradenton	0 (0) [0]	0 (0) [0]
21	Shalrie Joseph	(Grenada)	DMF / CMF	May 24, 1978 (age 48)	(United States) Chivas USA	14 (10) [2]	1 (1) [0]
25	Andy Rose	(England)	CMF / DMF	February 13, 1990 (age 36)	(United States) Salt Lake	55 (41) [3]	5 (2) [0]
26	Adam Moffat	(Scotland)	CMF	May 15, 1986 (age 40)	(United States) Houston	9 (6) [3]	0 (0) [0]
27	Lamar Neagle	(United States)	LWM / SS	May 7, 1987 (age 39)	(Canada) Montreal	70 (53) [4]	16 (13) [1]
32	Philip Lund	(Denmark)	LWM	May 9, 1989 (age 37)	(Denmark) FC Fyn	1 (1) [0]	0 (0) [0]
Forwards
2	Clint Dempsey	(United States)	WG / SS / AMF	March 9, 1983 (age 43)	(England) Tottenham Hotspur	12 (9) [3]	1 (1) [0]
7	Eddie Johnson	(United States)	ST / WG	March 31, 1984 (age 42)	(England) Fulham	65 (49) [6]	29 (23) [3]
9	Obafemi Martins	(Nigeria)	ST	October 28, 1984 (age 42)	(Spain) Levante	22 (20) [1]	8 (8) [0]
16	David Estrada	(United States)	FW / RWM	February 4, 1988 (age 38)	(United States) UCLA	55 (40) [3]	7 (5) [0]
22	Eriq Zavaleta	(United States)	ST / CB	August 2, 1992 (age 34)	(United States) Indiana	5 (5) [0]	0 (0) [0]
28	Will Bates	(United States)	ST	April 1, 1991 (age 35)	(United States) Virginia	0 (0) [0]	0 (0) [0]
-	Fredy Montero (on loan to Sporting CP)	(Colombia)	FW	July 26, 1987 (age 39)	(Colombia) Deportivo Cali	160 (119) [10]	60 (47) [0]

== Squad statistics ==
=== Appearances and goals ===
No.	Pos	Nat	Player	Total		MLS Regular Season		MLS Cup Playoffs		Champions League		U.S. Open Cup	
No.	Pos	Nat	Player	Apps	Goals	Apps	Goals	Apps	Goals	Apps	Goals	Apps	Goals
1	GK	(Austria) AUT	Michael Gspurning	33	-41	28+0	-35	2+0	-3	3+0	-3	0+0	0
2	FW	(United States) USA	Clint Dempsey	12	1	6+3	1	3+0	0	0+0	0	0+0	0
3	MF	(United States) USA	Brad Evans	30	5	21+3	4	3+0	1	3+0	0	0+0	0
4	DF	(United States) USA	Patrick Ianni	9	0	7+2	0	0+0	0	0+0	0	0+0	0
6	MF	(Cuba) CUB	Osvaldo Alonso	33	1	26+0	0	3+0	1	4+0	0	0+0	0
7	FW	(United States) USA	Eddie Johnson	27	12	20+1	9	3+0	2	3+0	1	0+0	0
8	DF	(United States) USA	Marc Burch	26	0	13+7	0	1+2	0	0+2	0	1+0	0
9	FW	(Nigeria) NGR	Obafemi Martins	22	8	17+3	8	0+1	0	0+0	0	0+1	0
10	MF	(Argentina) ARG	Mauro Rosales	39	4	26+7	4	0+2	0	2+2	0	0+0	0
11	MF	(Democratic Republic of the Congo) COD	Steve Zakuani	11	0	6+2	0	0+0	0	2+1	0	0+0	0
12	DF	(Costa Rica) CRC	Leonardo González	33	0	27+0	0	2+0	0	4+0	0	0+0	0
14	MF	(United States) USA	Alex Caskey	14	0	5+5	0	0+0	0	3+0	0	1+0	0
15	MF	(United States) USA	Blair Gavin	0	0	0+0	0	0+0	0	0+0	0	0+0	0
16	MF	(United States) USA	David Estrada	18	0	4+13	0	0+0	0	0+0	0	1+0	0
17	DF	(United States) USA	DeAndre Yedlin	37	3	30+1	1	2+0	1	3+1	1	0+0	0
19	DF	(Mali) MLI	Djimi Traoré	34	2	25+2	1	3+0	0	4+0	1	0+0	0
20	DF	(United States) USA	Zach Scott	27	0	16+5	0	1+1	0	3+0	0	1+0	0
21	MF	(Grenada) GRN	Shalrie Joseph	14	1	6+4	1	1+1	0	2+0	0	0+0	0
22	FW	(United States) USA	Eriq Zavaleta	5	0	0+5	0	0+0	0	0+0	0	0+0	0
24	GK	(United States) USA	Marcus Hahnemann	8	-8	4+0	-4	1+1	-2	1+0	-1	1+0	-1
25	MF	(England) ENG	Andy Rose	21	1	9+9	1	0+0	0	0+2	0	1+0	0
26	MF	(Scotland) SCO	Adam Moffat	9	0	4+2	0	3+0	0	0+0	0	0+0	0
27	MF	(United States) USA	Lamar Neagle	35	9	27+3	8	2+0	0	0+2	1	1+0	0
28	FW	(United States) USA	Will Bates	0	0	0+0	0	0+0	0	0+0	0	0+0	0
29	GK	(United States) USA	Josh Ford	0	0	0+0	0	0+0	0	0+0	0	0+0	0
32	MF	(Denmark) DEN	Philip Lund	1	0	0+1	0	0+0	0	0+0	0	0+0	0
33	DF	(United States) USA	Dylan Remick	2	0	0+1	0	0+0	0	0+0	0	1+0	0
34	DF	(Colombia) COL	Jhon Kennedy Hurtado	33	0	25+2	0	3+0	0	2+0	0	1+0	0
			Own goals for	0	3	.	3	.	0	.	0	.	0
Players who left the club during the season: (Statistics shown are the appearances made and goals scored while at Seattle Sounders)
5	DF	(Sweden) SWE	Adam Johansson (Waived)	0	0	0+0	0	0+0	0	0+0	0	0+0	0
15	MF	(Honduras) HON	Mario Martínez (Loan over)	15	0	5+5	0	0+0	0	3+1	0	1+0	0
23	MF	(United States) USA	Servando Carrasco (Traded)	20	1	13+6	1	0+0	0	0+0	0	1+0	0
26	FW	(United States) USA	Sammy Ochoa (Waived)	8	0	2+2	0	0+0	0	2+1	0	0+1	0
30	DF	(United States) USA	Andrew Duran (Waived)	0	0	0+0	0	0+0	0	0+0	0	0+0	0
31	DF	(Jamaica) JAM	Ashani Fairclough (Waived)	0	0	0+0	0	0+0	0	0+0	0	0+0	0
37	GK	(United States) USA	Andrew Weber (Loan over)	3	-3	2+1	-3	0+0	0	0+0	0	0+0	0

Updated to match played November 7, 2013
Source: Competitive matches

=== Top scorers ===
Includes all competitive matches. The list is sorted by shirt number when total goals are equal.

Ran	No.	Pos	Nat	Name	MLS Regular Season	MLS Cup Playoffs	Champions League	U.S. Open Cup	Total
1	7	FW	(United States)	Eddie Johnson	9	2	1	0	12
2	27	MF	(United States)	Lamar Neagle	8	0	1	0	9
3	9	FW	(Nigeria)	Obafemi Martins	8	0	0	0	8
4	3	MF	(United States)	Brad Evans	4	1	0	0	5
5	10	MF	(Argentina)	Mauro Rosales	4	0	0	0	4
6	17	DF	(United States)	DeAndre Yedlin	1	1	1	0	3
7	19	DF	(Mali)	Djimi Traoré	1	0	1	0	2
8	2	FW	(United States)	Clint Dempsey	1	0	0	0	1
8	6	MF	(Cuba)	Osvaldo Alonso	0	1	0	0	1
8	21	MF	(Grenada)	Shalrie Joseph	1	0	0	0	1
8	23	MF	(United States)	Servando Carrasco	1	0	0	0	1
8	25	MF	(England)	Andy Rose	1	0	0	0	1
					3	0	0	0	3
				TOTALS	42	5	4	0	51

Last updated: November 7, 2013
Source: Competitive matches

Italic: denotes no longer with club.

=== Top assists ===
Includes all competitive matches. The list is sorted by shirt number when total assists are equal.

Ran	No.	Pos	Nat	Name	MLS Regular Season	MLS Cup Playoffs	Champions League	U.S. Open Cup	Total
1	10	MF	(Argentina)	Mauro Rosales	8	0	0	0	8
2	3	MF	(United States)	Brad Evans	5	0	0	0	5
3	8	DF	(United States)	Marc Burch	4	0	0	0	4
3	27	MF	(United States)	Lamar Neagle	4	0	0	0	4
5	9	FW	(Nigeria)	Obafemi Martins	3	0	0	0	3
5	17	DF	(United States)	DeAndre Yedlin	2	1	0	0	3
7	7	FW	(United States)	Eddie Johnson	2	0	0	0	2
7	11	MF	(Democratic Republic of the Congo)	Steve Zakuani	1	0	1	0	2
7	25	MF	(England)	Andy Rose	2	0	0	0	2
10	2	FW	(United States)	Clint Dempsey	0	1	0	0	1
10	6	MF	(Cuba)	Osvaldo Alonso	1	0	0	0	1
10	12	DF	(Costa Rica)	Leonardo González	1	0	0	0	1
10	15	MF	(Honduras)	Mario Martínez	1	0	0	0	1
10	21	MF	(Grenada)	Shalrie Joseph	0	1	0	0	1
10	23	MF	(United States)	Servando Carrasco	1	0	0	0	1
				TOTALS	35	3	1	0	39

Last updated: November 7, 2013
Source: Competitive matches

Italic: denotes no longer with club.

=== Clean sheets ===
Includes all competitive matches. The list is sorted by shirt number when total clean sheets are equal.

Ran	No.	Pos	Nat	Name	MLS Regular Season	MLS Cup Playoffs	Champions League	U.S. Open Cup	Total
1	1	GK	(Austria)	Michael Gspurning	10	1	0	0	11
2	24	GK	(United States)	Marcus Hahnemann	1	0	0	0	1
3	29	GK	(United States)	Josh Ford	0	0	0	0	0
3	37	GK	(United States)	Andrew Weber	0	0	0	0	0
				TOTALS	11	1	0	0	12

Last updated: November 7, 2013
Source: Competitive matches

Italic: denotes no longer with club.

=== Disciplinary record ===
Includes all competitive matches. The list is sorted by shirt number when total cards are equal.

R	No.	Pos	Nat	Name	MLS Regular Season			MLS Cup Playoffs			Champions League			U.S. Open Cup			Total		
R	No.	Pos	Nat	Name	Yellow card	(yellow card) (yellow-red card)	Red card	Yellow card	(yellow card) (yellow-red card)	Red card	Yellow card	(yellow card) (yellow-red card)	Red card	Yellow card	(yellow card) (yellow-red card)	Red card	Yellow card	(yellow card) (yellow-red card)	Red card
1	20	DF	(United States)	Zach Scott	7	2	0	0	0	0	1	0	0	0	0	0	8	2	0
2	7	FW	(United States)	Eddie Johnson	6	0	0	1	0	0	1	0	0	0	0	0	8	0	0
3	6	MF	(Cuba)	Osvaldo Alonso	3	0	1	0	0	0	1	0	0	0	0	0	4	0	1
3	12	DF	(Costa Rica)	Leonardo González	4	0	1	0	0	0	0	0	0	0	0	0	4	0	1
3	19	DF	(Mali)	Djimi Traoré	5	0	0	0	0	0	0	0	0	0	0	0	5	0	0
3	34	FW	(Colombia)	Jhon Kennedy Hurtado	5	0	0	0	0	0	0	0	0	0	0	0	5	0	0
7	27	MF	(United States)	Lamar Neagle	1	0	1	2	0	0	0	0	0	0	0	0	3	0	1
8	3	MF	(United States)	Brad Evans	3	0	0	0	0	0	0	0	0	0	0	0	3	0	0
8	10	MF	(Argentina)	Mauro Rosales	2	0	0	0	0	0	1	0	0	0	0	0	3	0	0
8	17	DF	(United States)	DeAndre Yedlin	2	0	1	0	0	0	0	0	0	0	0	0	2	0	1
11	1	GK	(Austria)	Michael Gspurning	0	0	0	0	0	1	1	0	0	0	0	0	1	0	1
11	21	MF	(Grenada)	Shalrie Joseph	1	0	1	0	0	0	0	0	0	0	0	0	1	0	1
11	23	MF	(United States)	Servando Carrasco	2	0	0	0	0	0	0	0	0	0	0	0	2	0	0
11	25	MF	(England)	Andy Rose	2	0	0	0	0	0	0	0	0	0	0	0	2	0	0
15	2	FW	(United States)	Clint Dempsey	0	0	0	1	0	0	0	0	0	0	0	0	1	0	0
15	4	DF	(United States)	Patrick Ianni	1	0	0	0	0	0	0	0	0	0	0	0	1	0	0
15	8	DF	(United States)	Marc Burch	0	0	0	1	0	0	0	0	0	0	0	0	1	0	0
15	14	MF	(United States)	Alex Caskey	0	0	0	0	0	0	0	0	0	1	0	0	1	0	0
15	15	MF	(Honduras)	Mario Martínez	0	0	0	0	0	0	0	0	0	1	0	0	1	0	0
15	24	GK	(United States)	Marcus Hahnemann	0	0	1	0	0	0	0	0	0	0	0	0	0	0	1
15	26	MF	(Scotland)	Adam Moffat	1	0	0	0	0	0	0	0	0	0	0	0	1	0	0
				TOTALS	45	2	6	5	0	1	5	0	0	2	0	0	57	2	7

Last updated: November 7, 2013
Source: Competitive matches

Italic: denotes no longer with club.

=== Captains ===
Includes all competitive matches. The list is sorted by shirt number when games are equal.

No.	Pos.	Name	Games
10	MF	(Argentina) Mauro Rosales	28
6	MF	(Cuba) Osvaldo Alonso	8
3	DF	(United States) Brad Evans	5
20	DF	(United States) Zach Scott	1

Last updated: November 7, 2013
Source: Competitive matches

Italic: denotes no longer with club.

=== Team statistics ===
	Total	Home	Away
Games played	42	21	21
Games won	17	12	5
Games drawn	8	5	3
Games lost	17	4	13
Biggest win	4–0 v San Jose Earthquakes	4–0 v San Jose Earthquakes	2–0 v Chivas USA
Biggest win (League)	4–0 v San Jose Earthquakes	4–0 v San Jose Earthquakes	2–0 v Chivas USA
Biggest win (Playoffs)	2–0 v Colorado Rapids	2–0 v Colorado Rapids	n/a
Biggest win (North America)	3–1 v Tigres UANL	3–1 v Tigres UANL	n/a
Biggest win (Cup)	n/a	n/a	n/a
Biggest loss	0–4 v Los Angeles Galaxy; 1–5 v Colorado Rapids	1–4 v Vancouver Whitecaps FC	0–4 v Los Angeles Galaxy; 1–5 v Colorado Rapids
Biggest loss (League)	0–4 v Los Angeles Galaxy; 1–5 v Colorado Rapids	1–4 v Vancouver Whitecaps FC	0–4 v Los Angeles Galaxy; 1–5 v Colorado Rapids
Biggest loss (Playoffs)	1–2 v Portland Timbers; 2–3 v Portland Timbers	1–2 v Portland Timbers	2–3 v Portland Timbers
Biggest loss (North America)	0–1 v Tigres UANL; 0–1 v Santos Laguna	0–1 v Santos Laguna	0–1 v Tigres UANL
Biggest loss (Cup)	0–1 v Tampa Bay Rowdies	n/a	0–1 v Tampa Bay Rowdies
Clean sheets	12	8	4
Goals scored	51	35	16
Goals conceded	52	19	33
Goal difference	-1	+16	-17
Average GF per game	1.21	1.67	0.76
Average GA per game	1.24	0.9	1.57
Yellow cards	57	26	31
Red cards	9	1	8
Most appearances	Rosales (39)	Rosales (19)	Rosales (20)
Top scorer	Johnson 12	Neagle 8	Johnson 5
Worst discipline	Scott 8 (yellow card) 2 (red card)	Johnson 5 (yellow card)	Scott 6 (yellow card) 2 (red card)
Penalties for	3/5 60%	3/4 75%	0/1 0%
Penalties against	3/3 100%	0/0	3/3 100%
Points (League)	50.98%	68.63%	33.33%
Winning rate	40.48%	57.14%	23.81%

Last updated: November 7, 2013
Source: Competitive matches

=== Starting XI ===
Includes all competitive matches.

No.	Pos.	Nat.	Name	MS	Notes
1	GK	(Austria)	Gspurning	33	Hahnemann has 7 starts. Weber has 2 starts.
2	RB	(United States)	Yedlin	35	Remick has 1 start.
34	CB	(Colombia)	Hurtado	31	Scott has 21 starts.
19	CB	(Mali)	Traoré	32	Ianni has 7 starts.
12	LB	(Costa Rica)	González	33	Burch has 15 starts.
6	DM	(Cuba)	Alonso	33	Rose has 10 starts. Moffat has 7 start.
10	RM	(Argentina)	Rosales	28	Estrada has 5 starts.
3	AM	(United States)	Evans	27	Carrasco has 14 starts. Joseph has 9 starts.
27	LM	(United States)	Neagle	30	Martínez has 9 starts. Zakuani has 8 starts.
7	SS	(United States)	Johnson	26	Caskey has 9 starts. Dempsey has 9 start.
9	CF	(Nigeria)	Martins	17	Ochoa has 4 starts.

Last updated: November 7, 2013
Source: Squad statistics and Start formations
Only competitive matches.
Using the most used start formation.
Ordered by position on pitch (from back right to front left).

Italic: denotes no longer with club.

== Awards ==
=== MLS All-Stars ===
Position	Player	Link
DF	(United States) DeAndre Yedlin	All-Stars

=== Sounders FC MVP ===
Position	Player	Link
MF	(Cuba) Osvaldo Alonso	MVP

=== Sounders FC Defender of the Year ===
Position	Player	Link
DF	(Costa Rica) Leonardo González	DEF

=== Sounders FC Golden Boot ===
Position	Player	Link
FW	(United States) Eddie Johnson	BOOT

=== 24 Under 24 ===
Rank	Player	Link
3	(United States) DeAndre Yedlin	24 Under 24

=== MLS Player of the Week ===
Week	Player	Opponent	Link
12	(United States) Eddie Johnson	FC Dallas	Player of the Week
29	(Nigeria) Obafemi Martins	Real Salt Lake	Player of the Week

=== AT&T Goal of the Week ===
Week	Player	Opponent	Link
21	(United States) DeAndre Yedlin	Colorado Rapids	Goal of the Week
29	(Nigeria) Obafemi Martins	Real Salt Lake	Goal of the Week

=== MLS Save of the Week ===
Week	Player	Opponent	Link
24	(United States) Marcus Hahnemann	Toronto FC	Save of the Week
27	(Austria) Michael Gspurning	Columbus Crew	Save of the Week

=== MLS Team of the Week ===
Week	Player	Opponent	Link
1	(United States) DeAndre Yedlin	Montreal Impact	Team of the Week
3	(United States) Eddie Johnson	Portland Timbers	Team of the Week
4	(Mali) Djimi Traoré	San Jose Earthquakes	Team of the Week
5	(Austria) Michael Gspurning	Real Salt Lake	Team of the Week
11	(Mali) Djimi Traoré (United States) Lamar Neagle (Argentina) Mauro Rosales; Coach: (United States) Sigi Schmid	Sporting Kansas City; San Jose Earthquakes	Team of the Week
12	(United States) Lamar Neagle (United States) Eddie Johnson	FC Dallas	Team of the Week
14	(Mali) Djimi Traoré	Chivas USA	Team of the Week
15	(United States) Lamar Neagle	Vancouver Whitecaps FC	Team of the Week
19	(Nigeria) Obafemi Martins	Vancouver Whitecaps FC	Team of the Week
22	(United States) Marc Burch	Chivas USA	Team of the Week
23	(Mali) Djimi Traoré	FC Dallas	Team of the Week
27	(Colombia) Jhon Kennedy Hurtado	Columbus Crew	Team of the Week
28	(United States) Lamar Neagle	Chicago Fire	Team of the Week
29	(United States) DeAndre Yedlin (Nigeria) Obafemi Martins	Real Salt Lake	Team of the Week
30	(Colombia) Jhon Kennedy Hurtado	Los Angeles Galaxy	Team of the Week

=== Sounders FC Humanitarian of the Year ===
Player	Link
(United States) Lamar Neagle	Humanitarian of the Year

=== MLS WORKS Humanitarian of the Month ===
Month	Player	Link
August	(United States) Lamar Neagle	Humanitarian of the Month

== Reserves ==
=== MLS Reserves League ===
==== League table ====
West Division

Pos	Club	Pld	W	L	T	GF	GA	GD	Pts	PPG
1	LA Galaxy Reserves (C)	10	5	1	4	16	9	+7	19	1.90
2	Vancouver Whitecaps Reserves	10	4	2	4	21	15	+6	16	1.60
3	Real Salt Lake Reserves	14	6	4	4	14	13	+1	22	1.57
4	Chivas USA Reserves	12	5	6	1	23	24	-1	16	1.33
5	San Jose Earthquakes Reserves	10	4	5	1	18	12	+6	13	1.30
6	Colorado Rapids Reserves	14	5	7	2	16	20	-4	17	1.21
7	Seattle Sounders FC Reserves	12	4	6	2	17	21	-4	14	1.17
8	Portland Timbers Reserves	14	4	7	3	16	23	-7	15	1.07

==== Match results ====
Win Tie Loss

March 17, 2013 Match 1	Seattle Sounders FC	0–1	Portland Timbers	Tukwila, Washington
17:00 PDT		Report	Valencia 86'	Stadium: Starfire Sports Complex

April 15, 2013 Match 2	Los Angeles Galaxy	1–1	Seattle Sounders FC	Carson, California
11:00 PDT	Jiménez 29' (pen.); Gaul (yellow card) 79'	Report	Zavaleta 7'	Stadium: Home Depot Center; Referee: Jesse Cisneros

April 23, 2013 Match 3	Seattle Sounders FC	2–1	San Jose Earthquakes	Tukwila, Washington
20:00 PDT	Gorskie 56' (o.g.); Bates 69'; Ochoa (yellow card) 90'	Report	Gorskie 90+1'	Stadium: Starfire Sports Complex; Referee: Katja Koroleva

May 12, 2013 Match 4	Seattle Sounders FC	0–2	Orlando City	Tacoma, Washington
16:00 PDT	Rose (yellow card) 57'	Report	Dwyer 4', 53'	Stadium: Cheney Stadium; Attendance: 2,174; Referee: Timon Berry

June 2, 2013 Match 5	Chivas USA	2–1	Seattle Sounders FC	Carson, California
11:00 PDT	Calvert 69'; Bowen 76'	Report	Purdy 77' (o.g.); Ianni (yellow card) 82'	Stadium: StubHub Center; Referee: Ryan Van Duyne

July 7, 2013 Match 6	Vancouver Whitecaps FC	4–0	Seattle Sounders FC	Vancouver, British Columbia
11:00 PDT	Hurtado 59'; Adekugbe 63'; Heinemann 74', 90+3'	Report	Bates (yellow card) 25'; Ochoa (yellow card) 64'	Stadium: Thunderbird Stadium; Attendance: 1,077; Referee: Rubinco Smiley

July 21, 2013 Match 7	Seattle Sounders FC	2–3	Colorado Rapids	Tukwila, Washington
14:00 PDT	Cunningham 12'; Wingo 72'	Report	Mwanga 6'; Cascio 13', 20'; Castrillón (yellow card) 86'	Stadium: Starfire Sports Complex

July 29, 2013 Match 8	Seattle Sounders FC	3–2	Chivas USA	Tukwila, Washington
19:00 PDT	Zavaleta 44', 81'; Carrasco 72' (pen.); Morris (yellow card) 90+'	Report	Rivera 34', 37'; Frias (yellow card) 48'; Iraheta (yellow card) 70'; Ponce (yellow card) 84'	Stadium: Starfire Sports Complex; Referee: Chipalo Street

August 11, 2013 Match 9	Orlando City	2–0	Seattle Sounders FC	Orlando, Florida
16:30 PDT	Molino 1'; Pulis (yellow card) 21'; Valentino 30'	Report	Carrasco (yellow card) 23'; Burch (yellow card) 88'	Stadium: Citrus Bowl; Attendance: 10,697; Referee: Donal Dellavia

August 26, 2013 Match 10	Seattle Sounders FC	2–2	Vancouver Whitecaps FC	Tukwila, Washington
19:00 PDT	Zavaleta 51'; Burch (yellow card) 73'; Crook (yellow card) 81'; Estrada 90+3'	Report	Bustos 30'; Mitchell 82'	Stadium: Starfire Sports Complex; Referee: Levi Rippy

September 14, 2013 Match 11	Seattle Sounders FC	2–0	Real Salt Lake	Tukwila, Washington
12:00 PDT	Estrada 13'; Ianni 54'	Report	Saucedo (yellow card) 74'	Stadium: Starfire Sports Complex; Referee: Josh Wilkens

October 14, 2013 Match 12	Portland Timbers	1–4	Seattle Sounders FC	Portland, Oregon
14:00 PDT	Rincón 54'	Report	Estrada 7'; Bates (yellow card) 27'; Azira 34'; Rose 70'; Crook 82'	Stadium: Jeld-Wen Field; Referee: Ronald Lagraff

== Miscellany ==
=== Allocation ranking ===
Seattle is in the No. 3 position in the MLS Allocation Ranking. It swapped its natural position, No. 15, with Chivas USA in the Shalrie Joseph trade. The allocation ranking is the mechanism used to determine which MLS club has first priority to acquire a U.S. National Team player who signs with MLS after playing abroad, or a former MLS player who returns to the league after having gone to a club abroad for a transfer fee. A ranking can be traded, provided that part of the compensation received in return is another club's ranking.

=== International roster slots ===
Seattle has eight MLS International Roster Slots for use in the 2013 season. Each club in Major League Soccer is allocated eight international roster spots and Seattle traded an international spot to Montreal Impact in return for Lamar Neagle.

Seattle Sounders FC International slots
Slot	Player	Nationality
1	Djimi Traoré	Mali
2	Obafemi Martins	Nigeria
3	Philip Lund	Denmark
4	VACANT	
5	VACANT	
6	VACANT	
7	VACANT	

Foreign-Born Players with Domestic Status
Player	Nationality
Osvaldo Alonso	Cuba / (United States)
Leonardo González	(Costa Rica) Costa Rica^{G}
Jhon Kennedy Hurtado	(Colombia) Colombia^{G}
Fredy Montero	(Colombia) Colombia^{G}
Steve Zakuani	(Democratic Republic of the Congo) DR Congo / (England) England^{G}
Mauro Rosales	(Argentina) Argentina^{G}
Michael Gspurning	(Austria) Austria^{G}
Shalrie Joseph	Grenada / (United States)
Adam Moffat	(Scotland) Scotland^{G}
Andy Rose	(England) England^{G}

- (United States) – Player is U.S. citizen;
- G – Player has U.S. green card.

=== Kits ===
Home	Home Alt. 1	Home Alt. 2	Away	Third

Type	Shirt	Shorts	Socks	First appearance / Info
Home	Rave Green	Blue	Rave Green	
Home Alt.	Rave Green	Rave Green	Blue	MLS, March 23 against San Jose
Home Alt.	Rave Green	Rave Green	Rave Green	MLS, May 4 against Philadelphia
Away	Shale	Shale	Shale	
Third	Cyan	Cyan	Cyan	

=== Future draft picks ===
Acquired
Year	Draft	Round	Traded from
2014	SuperDraft	Round 2	Chivas USA
2014	Supplemental Draft	Round 1	Portland Timbers
2014	Supplemental Draft	Round 4	San Jose Earthquakes
2015	SuperDraft	Round 2	Chivas USA
2015	Unspecified	Conditional	Portland Timbers

Traded
Year	Draft	Round	Traded to
2014	SuperDraft	Round 2	Houston Dynamo
2014	SuperDraft	Round 3	Vancouver Whitecaps FC
Unspecified	Unspecified	Conditional	Real Salt Lake
Unspecified	Unspecified	Conditional	Toronto FC
