= 2013 Desert Diamond Cup =

Tournament details
- Host country: United States
- Dates: February 13 − February 23
- Teams: 4
- Venue(s): 1 (in 1 host city)

Final positions
- Champions: Seattle Sounders FC (1st title)

Tournament statistics
- Matches played: 8
- Goals scored: 23 (2.88 per match)
- Top scorer(s): Jerry Bengtson; Alex Caskey; Mario Martínez; Lee Nguyen (2 goals)

The 2013 Desert Diamond Cup was a soccer exhibition featuring four soccer teams from Major League Soccer, held between February 13–23, 2013. The preseason tournament was played at the Kino Sports Complex 11,000 seat main stadium in Tucson, Arizona. This was the 3rd annual Desert Diamond Cup.

== Teams ==
The following four clubs participated in the 2013 tournament:

- New England Revolution (second appearance)
- New York Red Bulls (third appearance)
- Real Salt Lake (second appearance)
- Seattle Sounders FC (first appearance)

== Table standings ==
Pos	Team	Pld	W	L	D	GF	GA	GD	Pts
1	Seattle Sounders FC	3	3	0	0	6	1	+5	9
2	Real Salt Lake	3	1	1	1	6	6	0	4
3	New England Revolution	3	1	2	0	5	6	−1	3
4	New York Red Bulls	3	0	2	1	3	7	−4	1

== Matches ==
The tournament featured a round-robin group stage followed by third-place and championship matches.

=== Tournament ===
February 13 1	Seattle Sounders FC	2–0	New England Revolution	Tucson, Arizona
16:00 PST	González (yellow card) 18'; Johnson (yellow card) 25' (goal) 45'; Evans 27' (pen.); Alonso (yellow card) 32'; Traoré (yellow card) 43'; Burch (red card) 79'	Report	Gonçalves (yellow card) 25'; Nyassi (red card) 79'	Stadium: Kino Veterans Memorial Stadium; Attendance: 1,162; Referee: Juan Guzman

February 13 2	Real Salt Lake	2–2	New York Red Bulls	Tucson, Arizona
18:00 PST	Plata 1'; Grossman 3'	Report	Olave 31'; Bustamante 61'	Stadium: Kino Veterans Memorial Stadium; Attendance: 1,162; Referee: Ricardo Salazar

February 16 3	Real Salt Lake	1–2	Seattle Sounders FC	Tucson, Arizona
16:00 PST	Schuler (yellow card) 20'; Mansally (yellow card) 34'; Stertzer 86'	Report	Martínez 66'; Lund 69'	Stadium: Kino Veterans Memorial Stadium; Attendance: 3,211; Referee: Allen Chapman

February 16 4	New England Revolution	3–1	New York Red Bulls	Tucson, Arizona
18:00 PST	Nguyen 53' (pen.); Bengtson 58'; Caldwell (yellow card) 84'; Jesic 88'	Report	Juninho 11'; Robles (yellow card) 65'	Stadium: Kino Veterans Memorial Stadium; Attendance: 3,211; Referee: Ricardo Salazar

February 20 5	New England Revolution	2–3	Real Salt Lake	Tucson, Arizona
16:00 PST	Dorman 50' (yellow card) 67'; Duckett (yellow card) 54'; Soares 57'	Report	Sandoval 22'; Álvarez (yellow card) 69'; Saborío 88'; Stephenson 90+'	Stadium: Kino Veterans Memorial Stadium; Referee: Ismail Elfath

February 20 6	Seattle Sounders FC	2–0	New York Red Bulls	Tucson, Arizona
18:00 PST	Zavaleta (yellow card) 4'; Caskey 36'; Martínez 78'	Report		Stadium: Kino Veterans Memorial Stadium; Referee: Armando Villarreal

=== Third place match ===
February 23 7	New England Revolution	2–0	New York Red Bulls	Tucson, Arizona
15:00 PST	Nguyen 4'; Bengtson 36'; Toja (yellow card) 45'	Report	Espíndola (yellow card) 17'; Miller (yellow card) 45+'; Cahill (yellow card) 65'	Stadium: Kino Veterans Memorial Stadium; Attendance: 4,528

=== Final ===
February 23 8	Seattle Sounders FC	1–0	Real Salt Lake	Tucson, Arizona
17:00 PST	Caskey 50'; Fairclough (yellow card) 66'	Report		Stadium: Kino Veterans Memorial Stadium; Attendance: 4,528; Referee: Jair Marrufo

== Final placement ==
#	Team
1	Seattle Sounders FC
2	Real Salt Lake
3	New England Revolution
4	New York Red Bulls
