= History of Seattle Sounders FC =

History of a United States Soccer team

Seattle Sounders FC is a Major League Soccer team, sanctioned by the United States Soccer Federation, based in Seattle, Washington with origins that go back to the 1970s and the North American Soccer League.

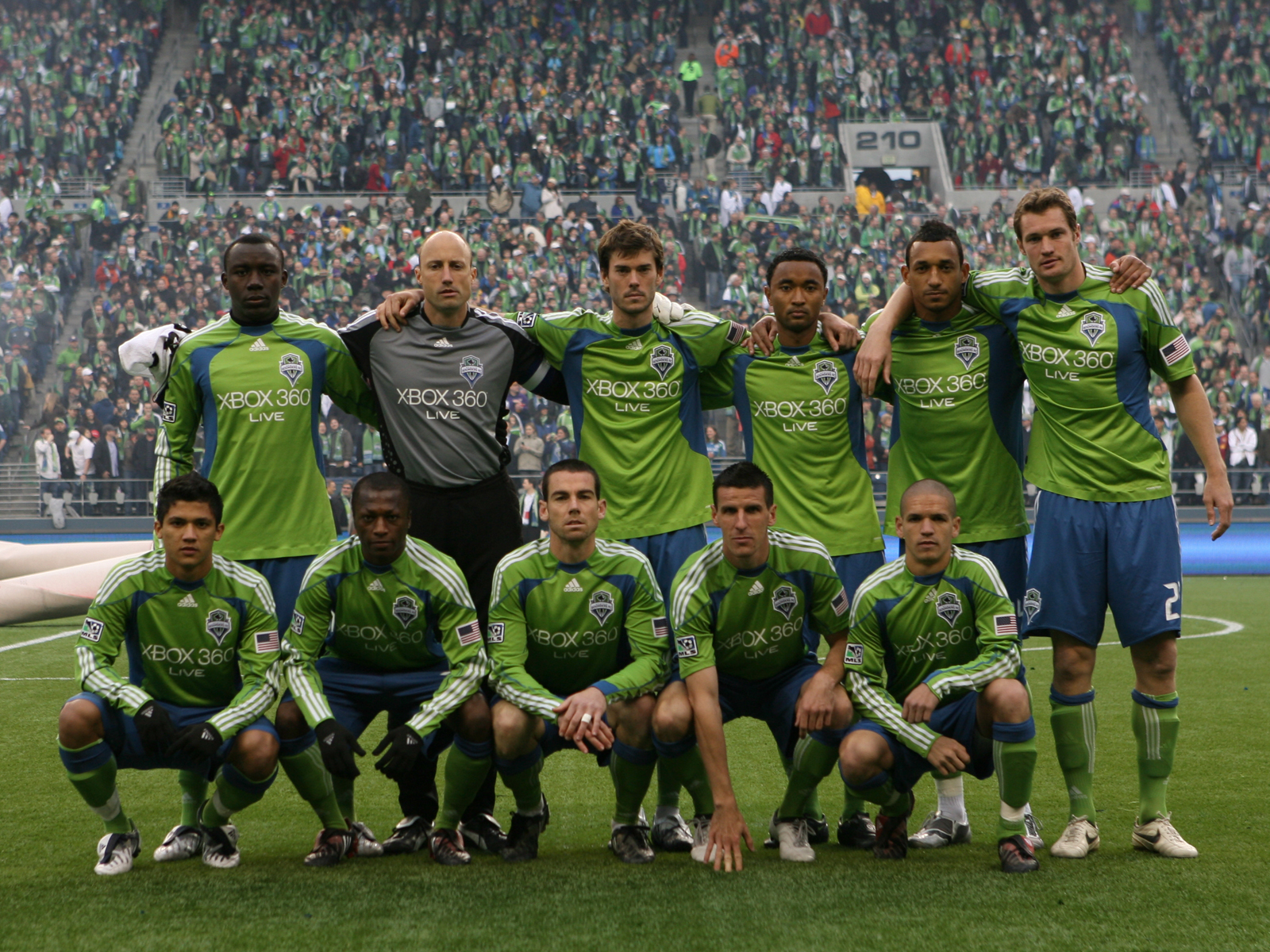
The starting lineup for Seattle Sounders FC before their inaugural game on March 19, 2009

== Inception ==
Even before the first cities in the United States were chosen to host Major League Soccer teams, Seattle was considered a viable location for a professional team. In 1994, as the U.S. was preparing to host the FIFA World Cup, more than 30 cities were pursuing the rights to an MLS team, Seattle being among them. However, despite the strong soccer fan base in Seattle, the absence of a soccer-only stadium was a drawback to establishing an MLS team. Cities seeking consideration for an inaugural MLS team were also expected to secure 10,000 assurances from fans for season tickets. By the June 3, 1994 deadline for MLS team bids, Seattle's soccer organizers had secured fewer than 1,500 such assurances. These low numbers were a result of competition between the ticket campaign for the MLS expansion team and for the American Professional Soccer League (APSL) Sounders expansion team.

In a June 14, 1994 announcement, Seattle was not included among the first seven cities to be awarded an MLS team. Five more teams were to be announced later in the year, and to improve their chances this time, the city's soccer organizers began working with the University of Washington to secure use of Husky Stadium as an interim stadium while they pursued the construction of a permanent soccer-specific facility. In November 1994, the start of the first MLS season was postponed until 1996, and it was noted that the absence of an "adequate grass-field facility" in the area and the presence of the new APSL Seattle Sounders team had thwarted Seattle's MLS bid. In the end, Seattle was not among the cities chosen to establish a team during the first season of MLS.

In 1996, as Seattle Seahawks owner Paul Allen worked with the city to build a new football stadium for his team, the potential of an MLS expansion team that could be a co-tenant helped drive public support for the effort. Many of the state's voters supported the referendum to construct Seahawks Stadium because it was also expected to be a professional soccer venue. While the stadium problem was being resolved, a new issue emerged. By 2000, MLS was moving away from league-operated teams to investor-operated teams, so wealthy individuals would need to step forward for Seattle to obtain an MLS expansion team.

In 2003, Seattle was again listed as a possibility for an MLS expansion team when the ten-team league announced plans to expand into new markets. In 2004, MLS commissioner Don Garber indicated that Seattle had been "very close" to receiving the expansion team ultimately awarded to Salt Lake. Adrian Hanauer, then-owner of the United Soccer League's (USL) Sounders (formerly the APSL Sounders), was in discussions with MLS about an estimated payment of $1 million to secure rights to a Seattle franchise for 2006. However, when Seattle was passed over again in 2006, Hanauer announced that he would not be able to secure an expansion team without the help of more investors willing to cover the increasing MLS franchise fees which had grown beyond $10 million.

=== MLS expansion arrives ===
In 2007, Hanauer teamed up with Hollywood producer Joe Roth to make another bid for MLS expansion into Seattle, at a cost of $30 million. Paul Allen, whose First and Goal company operated Qwest Field (now Lumen Field), joined the ownership group that same year, making the bid the most promising yet for Seattle. During the first week of November 2007, rumors began to build that MLS would be announcing an expansion into Seattle the following week, and that the ownership group had taken on a fourth member, TV personality Drew Carey. In a press conference on November 13, 2007, it was announced that Seattle had been awarded an expansion team. The announcement marked the return of top-level soccer to Seattle for the first time since the dissolution of its North American Soccer League (NASL) team in 1983. The announcement also meant that the Seattle Sounders of the USL First Division would play its final season the year before the new MLS franchise was formed.

=== Team name, badge and colors unveiled ===
Fans chose a name for the team in an online poll held between March 27 and 31, 2008. The initial list of possibilities – Seattle FC, Seattle Republic and Seattle Alliance – deliberately did not include Seattle Sounders in order to provide a "fresh start". Despite the names having been selected through fan research and internal committees, the omission of the traditional Sounders name embittered many in the Seattle community. In response to the backlash, the team added a fourth "write-in" option for the team name, allowing for any name to be suggested on the ballot. Of the more than 14,500 votes received in choosing the new team name, 49% of the votes included some form of the name "Sounders". Upon announcing the name of the club, Hanauer acknowledged the significance of keeping with tradition: "The team playing at the highest level in our region has always been called Sounders. Starting with the NASL and then the USL 1st Division, we now have the chance to create a separate and distinct identity with the new MLS team."

"Seattle Sounders FC" was announced as the team name on April 7, 2008, along with the team logo, colors and badge design, in a presentation held at the Space Needle. The "FC" in the team moniker stands for Football Club, but the team name is officially "Seattle Sounders FC". The badge design resembles a heraldic shield, and consists of two layers which represent "the partnership between the ownership, the community, the players and the fans." The logo incorporates the Space Needle, an internationally recognized Seattle landmark. The official team colors are Sounder Blue, signifying the waters of the Puget Sound; Rave Green, representing the forests of the Pacific Northwest; and Cascade Shale, representing the Cascade Range to the east of Seattle.

Team ownership revealed the first Sounders FC jersey on May 28, 2008, and announced Microsoft as the team's sponsor in a five-year deal worth approximately $20 million. As part of the agreement, the Xbox 360 and Xbox Live brands appear on the front of Sounders FC jerseys and throughout the stadium.

== Sigi Schmid era (2009–2016) ==
=== 2009: Inaugural MLS Campaign ===
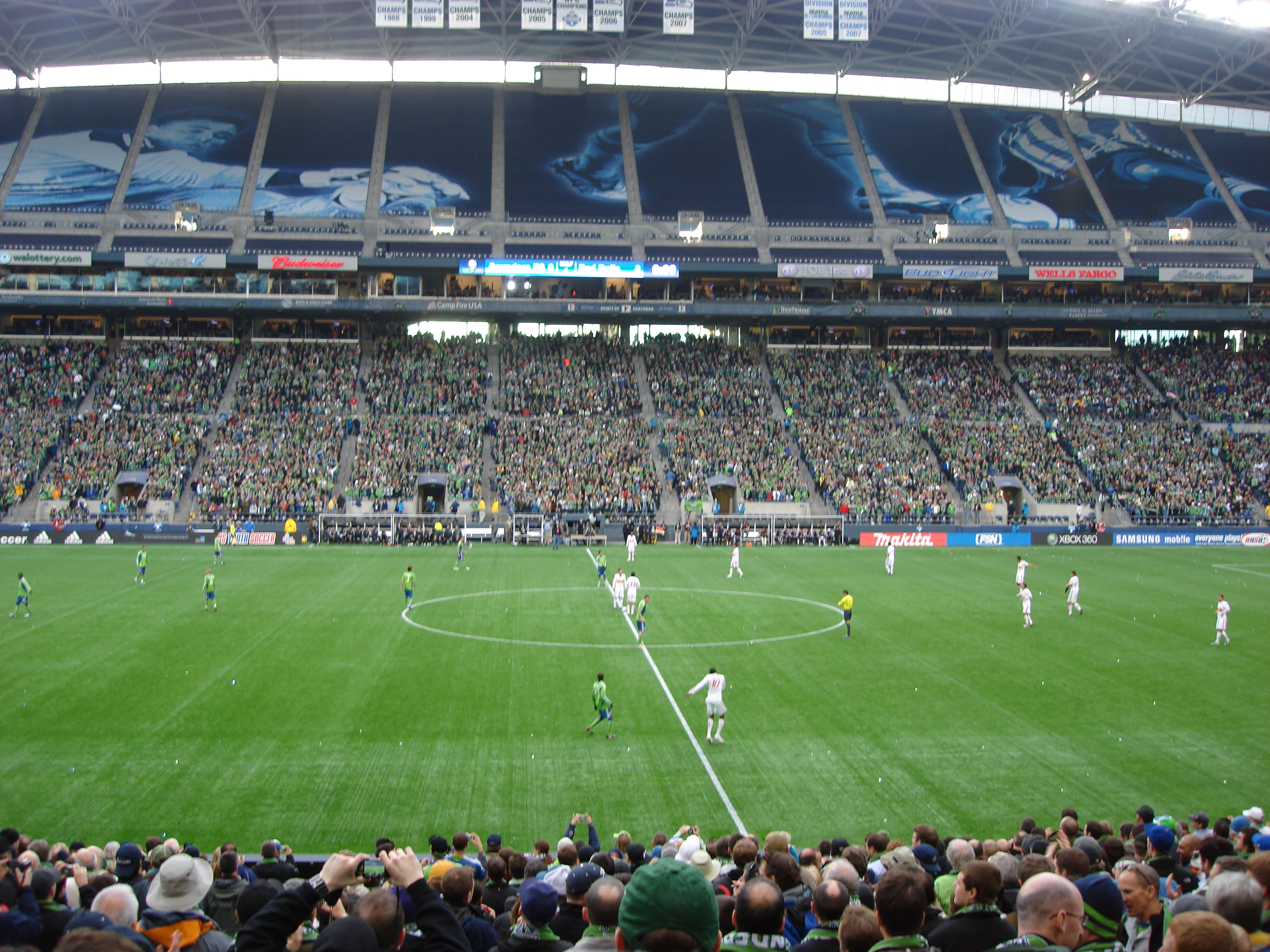
New York Red Bulls kick-off to start the 2009 MLS season against Seattle

The Sounders began their inaugural MLS campaign during the 2009 MLS season. Prior to the opening match, the Sounders sold all 22,000 of their season ticket packages. The 22,000 ticket holders, gave the Sounders a record for the most season ticket holders ever in MLS history. They played their first home match on March 19, 2009, to a sold-out crowd of 32,523, defeating the 2008 MLS Cup runners-up, New York Red Bulls, by a 3–0 margin. Seattle was the first MLS expansion team to win their first three games, and they did so with a shutout in each. Fredy Montero scored the first regular season goal in team history, finishing a movement from Sebastien Le Toux and Osvaldo Alonso in the 12th minute. Montero assisted Brad Evans' goal, and also scored the team's third goal. Kasey Keller, a veteran American goalkeeper who had played his entire career abroad, made his MLS debut at 39 years of age, and made two saves to register the team's first regular season shutout.

March 2009 saw Montero winning Player of the Week honors for week 1 and Keller for week 2. Montero won Goal of the Week for the first two games and was named the Player of the Month.

After their first two victories at home, Sounders FC played their MLS away fixture against Toronto FC. The Sounders expected a challenging away environment, but were victorious in a 2–0 shutout. Soon after, reports out of Seattle linked Montero to a sexual assault case with an unidentified woman. In a statement made by Sounders publicist, Montero asserted that the allegations stemmed from a disagreement in which he sought to end the relationship. and a police inquiry resulted in no charges being filed. Seattle Sounders FC suffered their first competitive loss at home against the Kansas City Wizards. Kasey Keller was sent off in the 29th minute for a handball outside the 18-yard box, as the Sounders fell 1–0 to the Wizards. The following week they lost at Chivas USA. Chris Eylander was scored on twice while covering the goal during Keller's suspension. The Sounders again failed to score.

The Sounders returned to their winning ways in a 2–0 home win versus the San Jose Earthquakes.

It was announced in early July that the Sounders had signed left-footed Costa Rican defender Leonardo González to help at the left back position. The position had been a weak spot in Seattle's defense and filled by three separate players throughout the season.

On July 11, the Sounders hosted the Houston Dynamo at Qwest Field. Brian Schmetzer filled in for Schmid who was at his son's wedding. Ianni scored his first goal of the season on bicycle kick that would earn him the MLS goal of the Week. On the following Tuesday, the Sounders defeated the Dynamo at Strfire in the U.S. Open Cup semifinals. Houston led when Jaqua scored in the 89th minute. King scored a goal five minutes into extra time, thus sending the Sounders FC to the Open Cup finals against D.C. United.

On July 18, 2009 the Seattle Sounders lost 0–2 in a friendly with Chelsea. All sections of the stadium were open and sold out with a crowd of 65,289 in attendance. The game was the first with the team for Chelsea's new manager, Carlo Ancelotti, and their new forward Daniel Sturridge.

The club set a state record for attendance at a soccer match on August 5, 2009, when 66,848 attended a friendly match with FC Barcelona.

On September 2, 2009, Sounders FC became the second MLS expansion team in league history (Chicago was first) to win the U.S. Open Cup tournament in their first season. They did so by defeating D.C. United 2–1 on the road at RFK Stadium. In winning the U.S. Open Cup tournament, they qualified for the preliminary round of the 2010–11 CONCACAF Champions League.

On October 17, 2009, Sounders FC became the second MLS expansion team in league history (again, Chicago had been first) to qualify for the playoffs in their first season. They clinched a playoff berth with a come-from-behind victory over the Kansas City Wizards 3–2 at Kansas City. Seattle finished the regular season with a record of 12 wins, 7 losses, and 11 ties. The club set a new MLS record for average attendance at 30,943 fans per game. Their inaugural season came to an end in the 2009 MLS Cup Playoffs when they lost in the conference semifinals to the Houston Dynamo with a 1–0 aggregate score in a two-legged series. During the 2009 season, all 15 Sounders FC MLS regular season home matches, their home playoff match, and their 4 home U.S. Open Cup matches (played at the Starfire Sports Complex) were sold out.

==== First U.S. Open Cup Title ====
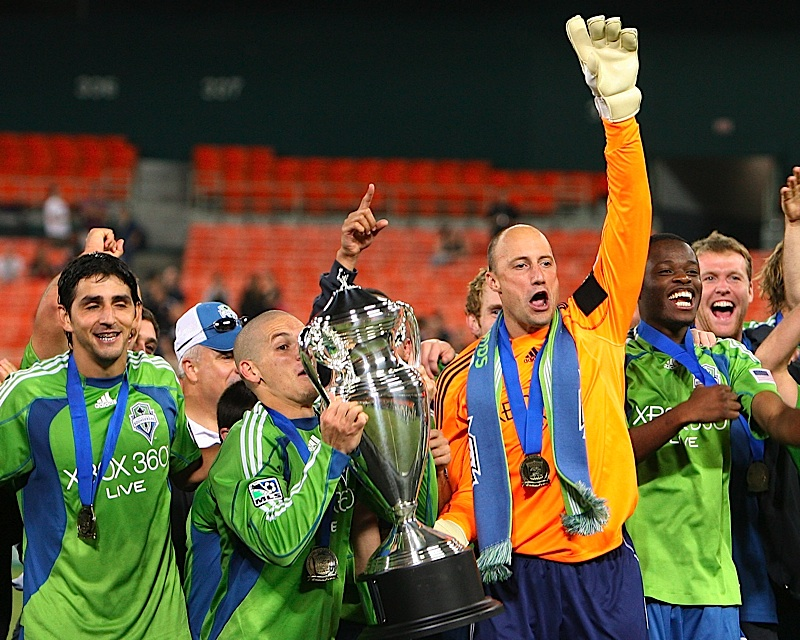
Sounders FC captain, Kasey Keller and midfielder Osvaldo Alonso hoist the 2009 U.S. Open Cup trophy

During the Sounders FC first season in MLS, the club won their first ever U.S. Open Cup title, including any past Sounders franchise. The team was also the first club in modern Open Cup history to win the tournament after playing through a string of qualification propers to enter at the third round proper.

Prior to their first qualification match against Real Salt Lake, Schmid asserted that the Open Cup was extremely critical to the club and that they were playing to win. One of the reasons the club cited, was the opportunity to qualify into the CONCACAF Champions League upon winning the Open Cup title. Sounders FC played U.S. Open Cup home games at the Starfire Sports Complex in Tukwila, Washington. The facility is older and smaller than the club's home stadium for league matches, Qwest Field, but Sounders FC representatives preferred the atmosphere at Starfire for smaller cup matches.

In the first qualification proper, on April 28, 2009; the Sounders defeated Salt Lake 4–1. Sebastian Le Toux scored two goals, and Roger Levesque had three assists in front of a sold-out crowd at Starfire. Sounders FC hosted their second qualification match on May 26, 2009, also at Starfire, this time against the Colorado Rapids. Reserve player Kevin Forrest scored the only goal in the match as Seattle defeated the Rapids 1–0, securing their entry into the third round proper of the official cup competition as one of the eight teams representing MLS.

One of the most unforgettable matches for the Sounders, was the third round proper fixture against their longstanding rivals, the Portland Timbers. Considered their most bitter rival over the past 30 years, it was the first time in four years that any Sounders or Timbers club competed against one another in the Open Cup. Traveling south to Portland, the Sounders claimed it would be one of the toughest matches of the entire tournament. In front of a sold-out crowd on July 1, 2009; the Sounders were able to defeat the Timbers 2–1, thanks to goals from Levesque and Nate Jaqua. The following week, in a quarterfinal match at Starfire, Sounders FC defeated visiting Kansas City 1–0 on a penalty kick in the 89th minute scored by Sebastien Le Toux. Three weeks later, on July 21, Sounders FC won their semifinal match 2–1 over the Houston Dynamo at Starfire. Seattle took the lead for good when Stephen King scored a goal five minutes into extra time, sending Sounders FC to the cup final.

On September 2, 2009, Sounders FC became the second MLS expansion team in league history (Chicago was first) to win the U.S. Open Cup tournament in their first season. They did so by defeating D.C. United 2–1 on the road at RFK Stadium. In winning the U.S. Open Cup tournament, they qualified for the preliminary round of the 2010–11 CONCACAF Champions League.

=== 2010: Second U.S. Open Cup and return to Champions League ===
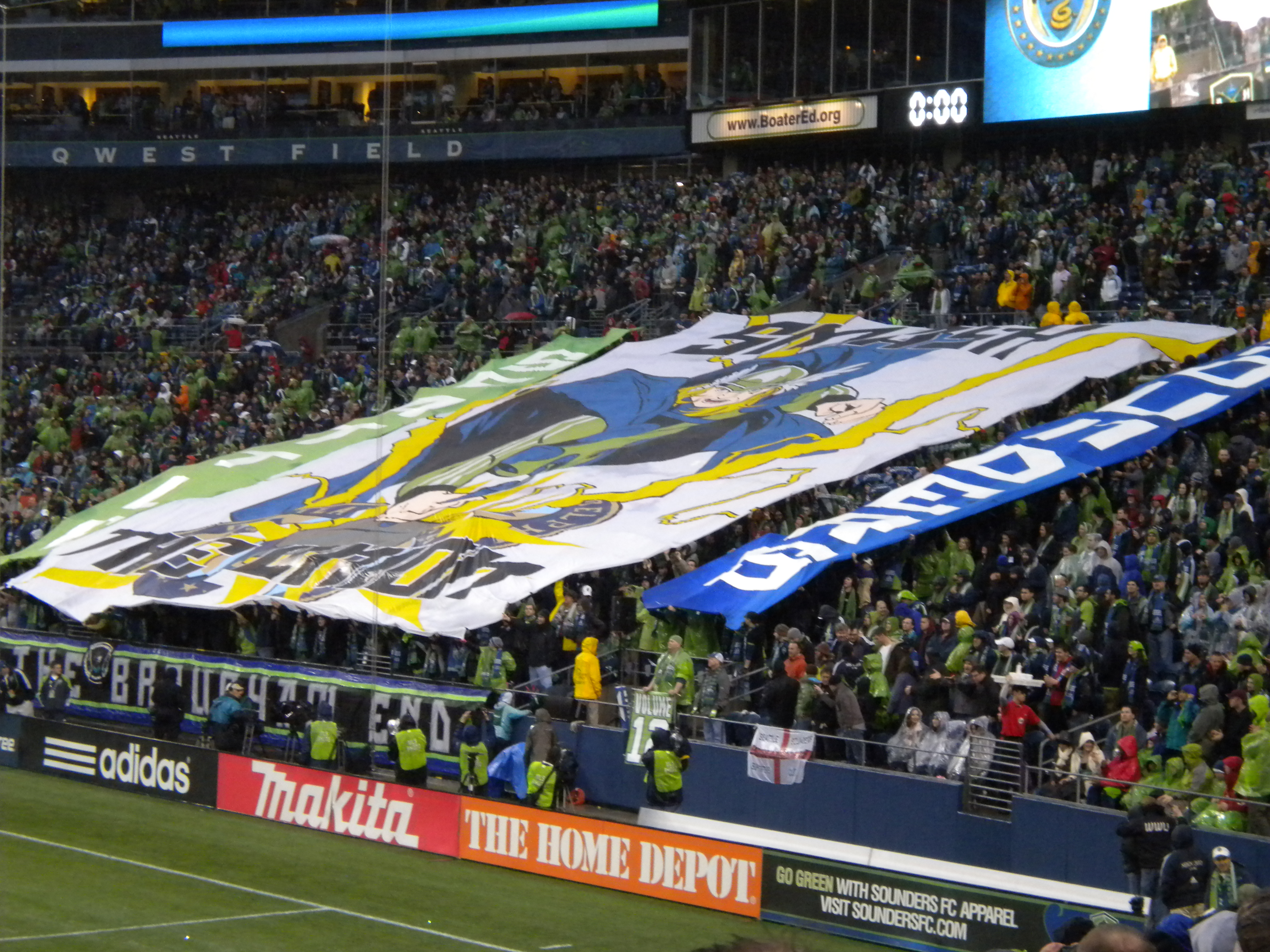
The Emerald City Supporters display their tifo before the first game of the 2010 MLS season at Qwest Field between Seattle Sounders FC and the Philadelphia Union.

For the second consecutive year, the Sounders were chosen to host the opening match of the MLS season, which was held on Thursday, March 25 and nationally televised on ESPN2. Joe Roth, Sounders FC Majority Owner stated, "Being selected to participate in the first match of the season is a testament to the passion and energy of our fans." Their opponent was the expansion franchise Philadelphia Union, the league's 16th team as they played in their inaugural match. Seattle won the match 2–0 with goals scored by Brad Evans in the 12th minute and Freddy Montero in the 43rd minute. The attendance of 36,241 set a team record for an MLS regular-season or postseason game.

2010 started off rough for the Sounders, first with a home loss to New York Red Bulls on April 2, and subsequently relinquishing a two-goal lead against defending MLS Cup champions, Real Salt Lake at Rio Tinto. In spite of knocking off Kansas City's unbeaten streak, the same situation would happen against Dallas, where the Sounders would play to another two-goal draw.

The following week, on April 17, Seattle returned home to face the undefeated Kansas City Wizards. The game appeared to be ending a scoreless tie until late substitute Michael Fucito scored his first career goal in 92nd minute of the match off a throw in from Brad Evans. Sounders FC defeated Kansas City 1–0. The following week, Seattle had two road games in a 4-day period. First they traveled to Frisco, TX to face FC Dallas on April 22. Steve Zakuani and Fredy Montero scored for Sounders FC while Jeff Cunningham scored two penalty kicks for Dallas, the second of which coming in extra time on a questionable call. The Dallas game ended in a 2–2 tie. During the second leg of the road trip on April 25, Sounders FC was defeated 2–0 by Toronto FC at BMO Field. Seattle conceded their first ever goal to Toronto when Dwayne De Rosario scored in the 58th minute. He later assisted O'Brian White on a second goal in the 76th minute.

Sounders FC began May with a tie at home against the Columbus Crew. Steve Zakuani scored an early breakaway goal in the 8th minute to take the lead. However, Seattle's stoppage time problems continued as the Crew's Steven Lenhart scored off a header in the first minute of stoppage time before the half. The game ended 1–1.

The 2010–11 CONCACAF Champions League lineup that defeated Isidro Metapán 1–0 at home

The following week, on May 8, Sounders FC hosted the Los Angeles Galaxy. Seattle's continued inability to score and their recent trend of defensive breakdowns culminated in an embarrassing 4–0 loss to the Galaxy. This was Seattle's worst ever defeat at home and it was played in front of a team record attendance for a regular season match of 36,273 fans. Sounders FC newcomer Miguel Montaño made his debut with the club in the defeat to the Galaxy. The day after the lopsided defeat to Los Angeles, Sounders FC owner Adrian Hanauer announced a refund for all 32,000 season ticket holders for the embarrassment and indicated that changes were in the works for the club.

Three days later, May 26, the team participated in their first friendly match of the season, winning it 3–0 in a shutout against Boca Juniors. Roger Levesque, Pat Noonan and Mike Seamon each scored goals, the latter in his debut for the team. The team ended the month with another 1–0 loss on May 29, this one against the Colorado Rapids, on the road; Conor Casey scored the only goal of the match.

Sounders FC regrouped from the difficult loss to LA the next week when they visited the New York Red Bulls. Fredy Montero's absence from the starting lineup was a surprising change in the match. Montero, however, was subbed on late in the game and provided the winning goal in the 85th minute for a 1–0 victory. During the first game of the 2010 Heritage Cup on May 22, the team lost 1–0 to the San Jose Earthquakes at Qwest. Chris Wondolowski scored 11 minutes in the match, lengthening the "scoring drought" for the Sounders FC at home.

=== 2011: Third U.S. Open Cup ===
On November 22, 2010, Seattle made a trade with the Colorado Rapids for defenders Julien Baudet of France and Danny Earls of the Republic of Ireland for Peter Vagenas. Also, the list of the ten protected players for the 2010 MLS Expansion Draft was decided by the club. The draft took place on November 24, 2010 when both the Portland Timbers and Vancouver Whitecaps FC sectected ten players from the Major League Soccer teams, including Sanna Nyassi (who was later traded to Colorado) and Nathan Sturgis (who was later traded to Toronto) from Seattle Sounders FC. Vancouver later traded Jamaican international O'Brian White to Seattle.

On December 9, 2010, Swedish club, BK Häcken reported that midfielder, Erik Friberg completed a three-year deal with the Seattle Sounders FC. Seattle has completed a deal bringing him over to the Seattle-based club. They also have announced a contract extension with captain Kasey Keller. On December 15, 2010, the Sounders selected Chris Seitz of the Philadelphia Union in the 2010 MLS Re-Entry Draft. The goalkeeper was later traded to FC Dallas for a fourth round pick of the 2012 MLS SuperDraft. Defender Tyrone Marshall was also selected in the draft by the Colorado Rapids.

The Sounders also competed in two additional competitions during the 2010 season – the CONCACAF Champions League and the U.S. Open Cup. In the Champions League, Seattle progressed through the preliminary round, beating Isidro Metapán 2–1 on aggregate, but was eliminated in the group stage. In the U.S. Open Cup, Seattle won matches at Portland and at home against the Los Angeles Galaxy and Chivas USA before reaching the final, which they hosted at CenturyLink Field against the Columbus Crew. On October 5, 2010, Seattle won the U.S. Open Cup final, 2–1, becoming the first team since 1983 to repeat as U.S. Open Cup champions. The final was played in front of a U.S. Open Cup record crowd of 31,311, and the victory ensured Seattle's return to the Champions League in 2011.

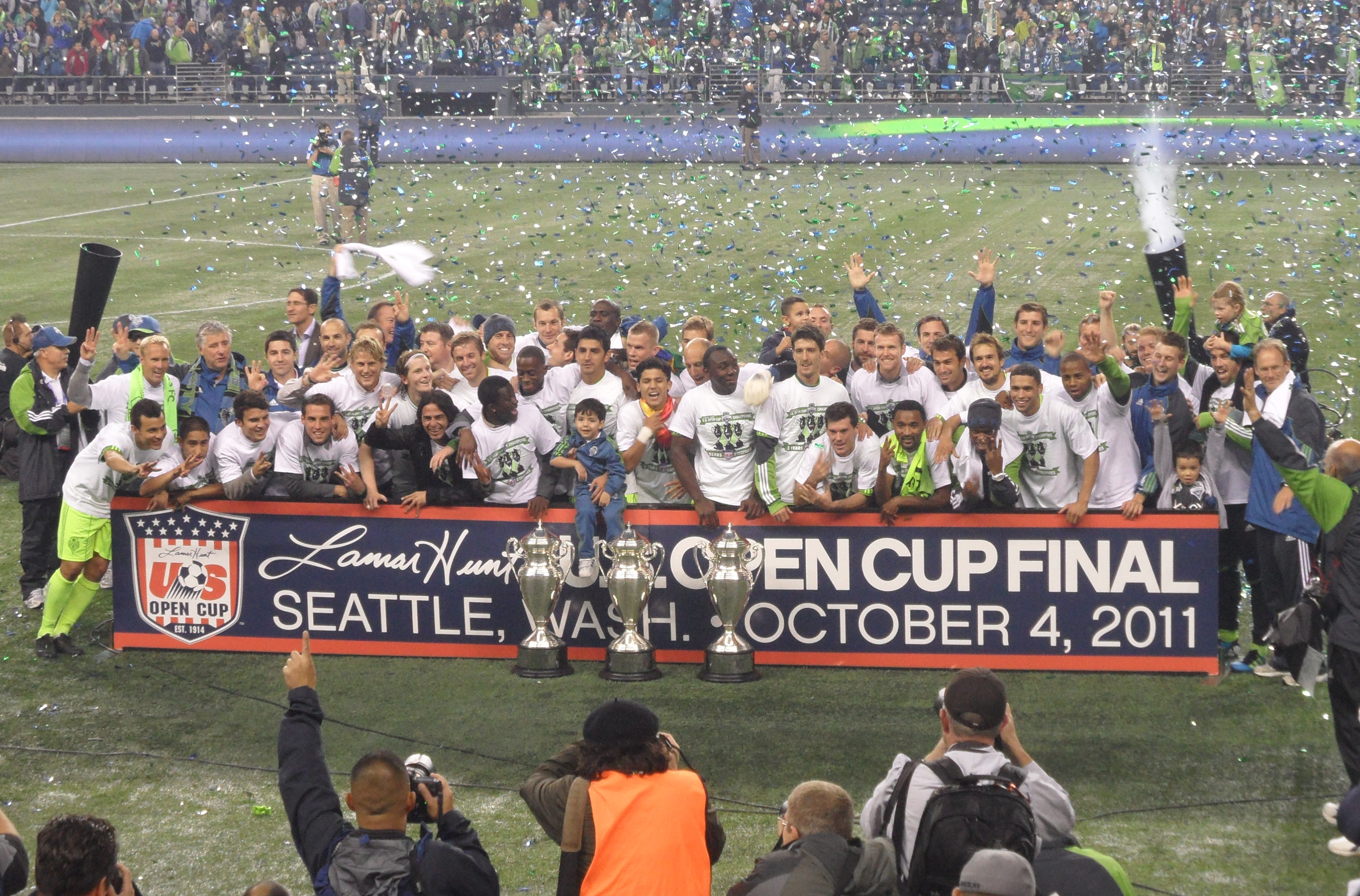
Sounders FC players with the '09, '10, and '11 U.S. Open Cup trophies.

The Sounders began the 2011 season by hosting the opening match of the MLS season for the third straight year. The club hosted the Los Angeles Galaxy, and lost 1–0. On April 22, 2011, in a match against the Colorado Rapids, Seattle's star midfielder Steve Zakuani suffered a broken leg in a challenge by the Rapids' Brian Mullan, which ended his season. Despite setbacks and a slow start to the season (the club won just 3 of its first 10 matches), the Sounders went on to finish the season with the second-best record in the league at 18 wins, 9 draws, 7 losses, and qualified for the playoffs for a third consecutive year. On October 4, 2011, Seattle won its third consecutive U.S. Open Cup, becoming the first club to do so in 42 years, as they defeated the Chicago Fire 2–0 in front of another tournament record crowd of 35,615 at CenturyLink Field. In the MLS playoffs, Seattle lost its Western Conference semi-final series 3–2 on aggregate to Real Salt Lake. The club dug itself a hole by losing 3–0 in Salt Lake, and could only net two goals in the second leg at home.

Sounders midfielder Mauro Rosales was recognized by the league as the 2011 Newcomer of the Year. In 2011, Seattle again broke its own league record for average attendance at 38,496. On October 15, 2011, the club hosted the third-largest crowd ever for a single MLS match, as 64,140 attended the final regular season home match. In the 2011–12 CONCACAF Champions League, the club finished second in its group and advanced to the knockout round, which was played starting in March 2012. In champions league group play, Seattle became only the second MLS team in history to win a competitive match in Mexico, defeating CF Monterrey 1–0 on August 23, 2011.

=== 2012: First trophy-less campaign ===
Seattle opened the 2012 season with a run of five straight wins in April and May, but fell into a month-long, nine-match winless streak in June. The winless streak ended in a match on July 7, which saw the return of Steve Zakuani from rehabilitation, against the Colorado Rapids. Seattle reached the U.S. Open Cup Final for the fourth consecutive year, becoming the first team to do so since 1937, but lost to Sporting Kansas City in a penalty shootout after a 1–1 draw. In Champions League group play, the team advanced to the knockout round with four straight wins, each including a goal from Sammy Ochoa. The Sounders finished third in the Western Conference and qualified for the playoffs, where they advanced out of the first round for the first time in the team's history. In the Conference Championship, Seattle fell 3–0 to Los Angeles in the first leg and came within one goal of tying the series on aggregate before letting an away goal, winning the second leg 2–1 but losing 4–2 on aggregate. The 2012 season ended without a major trophy for the Sounders, for the first time in their MLS history, and the team failed to qualify for the 2013–14 CONCACAF Champions League. The top scorer in league play was 28-year-old striker Eddie Johnson, who scored 14 goals in his first season with the club; he earned Comeback Player of the Year honors for his performance, which came after unsuccessful loans to European clubs.

=== 2013: Arrival of Clint Dempsey ===
During the 2013 preseason, the Sounders signed their first homegrown player, right back DeAndre Yedlin, veteran defender Djimi Traoré, and forward Obafemi Martins, who bought his release clause from his Spanish club. Longtime forward Fredy Montero left Seattle on loan to Colombian club Millonarios F.C. in January and, by July, was loaned to Sporting CP in Portugal with an option to buy; Montero was sold permanently to Sporting in 2014. The Sounders began the 2013 season with the knockout round of the 2012–13 Champions League, facing Mexican club Tigres UANL in the quarterfinals. After losing 1–0 in the away leg and conceding an away goal in the return leg, the Sounders scored three unanswered goals in the second half to win 3–1 and advance to the semifinals. With the win, the Sounders became the first MLS team to eliminate a Mexican team in the knockout stage of CONCACAF Champions League. Seattle once again played Santos Laguna in the semifinal, but failed to advance after losing 1–0 at home and drawing 1–1 in Torreón.

The Sounders began the MLS season with a run of five matches without a win, the worst start in the team's history, due to injuries to key players. The Sounders failed to advance in the U.S. Open Cup after losing to second-division Tampa Bay Rowdies in the third round, marking the end of the team's seven-year streak of appearances in the later rounds. As players returned to the team, Seattle improved to a six-win, four-loss record in 14 matches by late June. In August 2013, the Sounders completed the signing of U.S. national team captain Clint Dempsey from Tottenham Hotspur for $9 million, the largest transfer deal in the league's history, and a record salary of $32 million over four years. The team's continued run of wins put them into Supporters' Shield contention in September, coming within one point of the league-leading Red Bulls, but fell to fourth place in the conference after a run of four straight losses in October. The Sounders beat the Colorado Rapids 2–0 in the knockout round, and drew rivals Portland in the conference semifinal. Seattle fell 2–1 to the Timbers in the home leg and were defeated 3–2 in Portland, knocking the Sounders out in a performance that failed to live up to expectations.

The Sounders continued to break the MLS average attendance record for the fourth and fifth consecutive year in 2012 and 2013, with an average of 43,144 and 44,038, respectively. The higher attendances were helped by the opening of additional sections in the Hawks' Nest, as well as the opening of the upper deck of CenturyLink Field for select regular matches. The August 25, 2013, home match against the Portland Timbers drew a crowd of 67,385, the second-largest standalone attendance in league history.

=== 2014: First MLS Supporters' Shield and Fourth U.S. Open Cup ===
After a disappointing 2013 season, the Sounders replaced starting goalkeeper Michael Gspurning with Toronto's Stefan Frei. Several veteran players, including Eddie Johnson, Patrick Ianni, Jhon Kennedy Hurtado, Mauro Rosales, and Steve Zakuani, left the club as part of a major restructure; Brad Evans was named as club captain. Marco Pappa, an experienced MLS player and Guatemalan international, was added to the team. Homegrown player DeAndre Yedlin was transferred overseas to Tottenham Hotspur at the end of the season.

The Sounders advanced to the 2014 U.S. Open Cup Final and defeated the Philadelphia Union in extra time, to win their fourth trophy of the tournament. On October 25, 2014, the final game of the 2014 regular season, the Sounders defeated the LA Galaxy 2–0 to secure and win their first Supporters' Shield.

Entering the playoffs as the top seed, Seattle defeated FC Dallas on the away goals rule and advanced to the Western Conference Championship to face the LA Galaxy once again. The Sounders lost on aggregate score and the away goals rule after losing 1–0 away and winning 2–1 at home. LA would go on to win the MLS Cup.

=== 2015: Continued playoff frustration ===
Former Real Salt Lake general manager Garth Lagerwey was hired by the club in January 2015, replacing Adrian Hanauer.

Seattle was unable to repeat their successes in the 2014 season. The season started successfully, with several key wins that saw the team at the top of the Western Conference by June. During a 2015 Lamar Hunt U.S. Open Cup match against the Portland Timbers on June 16, however, Obafemi Martins left the game with a groin injury and Clint Dempsey was suspended after tearing a referee's pocketbook, though he would be called away for the 2015 CONCACAF Gold Cup.

The injury and suspension of the team's main attacking duo led to a death spiral during the summer, with Seattle winning only one match in nine games. By late August, Martins had recovered and led the team to an 8-match unbeaten streak to secure a playoff spot, finishing 4th in the Western Conference. The Sounders had also successfully topped their group in the 2015–16 CONCACAF Champions League, beating the Vancouver Whitecaps and Club Deportivo Olimpia, with two wins, one draw, and one loss. Paraguayan international Nelson Haedo Valdez was signed as the club's newest designated player, and was joined by fellow international signings Andreas Ivanschitz and Román Torres in August 2015; Erik Friberg also returned to the club after his stint in Europe.

During the playoff's opening knockout round, the Sounders defeated the LA Galaxy 3–2, ending a "curse" for the club, who had lost to LA in each of the three previous playoff matchups. The playoff run would end in the next round, the Western Conference semifinals against FC Dallas, during a penalty shootout after both teams were tied on aggregate score after extra time in Frisco, Texas.

In November 2015, Adrian Hanauer was made majority owner of the club, succeeding Joe Roth. The club set a new attendance record during the 2015 season, with an average attendance of 44,247.

=== 2016: Departure of Schmid ===
Prior to the 2016 season, Obafemi Martins abruptly left the club to sign with Shanghai Greenland Shenhua F.C. in the Chinese Super League, a move that would hamper the Sounders' offense during the season. The move was mitigated somewhat by the signing of homegrown product Jordan Morris. GM Lagerwey also traded Marco Pappa and Lamar Neagle to other clubs in the offseason.

During the first half of the 2016 season, the Sounders failed to meet expectations, placing near the bottom of the league with 6 wins, 12 losses, and 2 draws. After a 3–0 loss on July 24 to Sporting Kansas City, in which the Sounders had only one shot, Schmid left the club on mutual terms.

== Brian Schmetzer era (2016–present) ==
=== 2016: Comeback and MLS Cup ===
Long-time assistant coach Brian Schmetzer was named interim head coach upon Schmid's departure. The next day, the club announced their signing of Uruguayan midfielder Nicolás Lodeiro on a designated player contract, as well as the return of former designated player Álvaro Fernández. Despite the sluggish start as well as the loss of midfielder Clint Dempsey, who was forced in August to stop playing after evaluations for an irregular heartbeat, the Sounders rose from ninth place to fourth place in the Western Conference and qualified for the 2016 MLS Cup Playoffs, with eight wins, two losses, and four draws. Schmetzer was named as permanent head coach as a result.

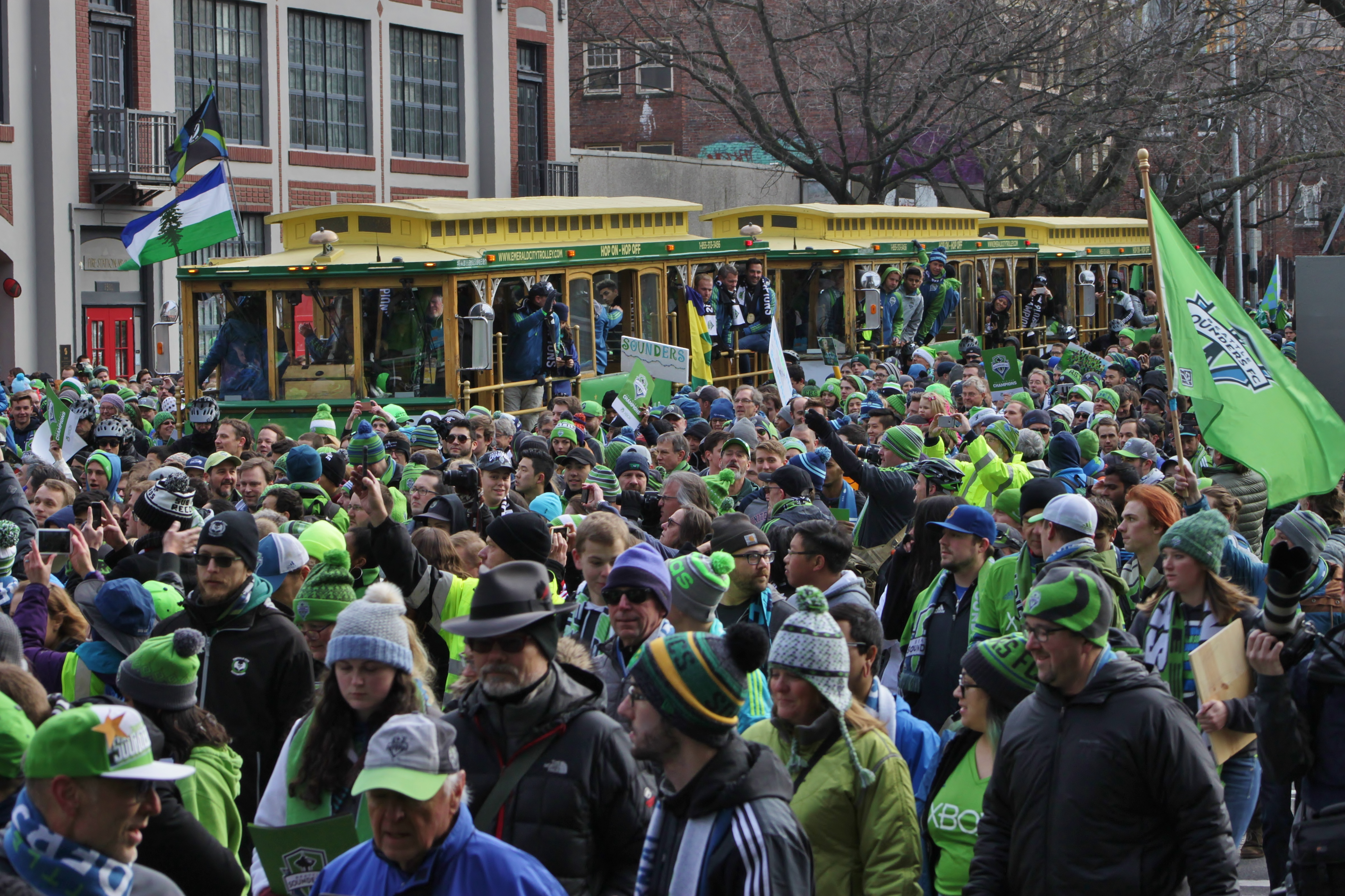
The victory parade for the Sounders after MLS Cup 2016

At the end of the regular season, Jordan Morris was named the MLS Rookie of the Year after scoring the most goals of any American rookie in MLS (12), and Nicolás Lodeiro was named MLS Newcomer of the Year for his 4 goals and 8 assists in 13 appearances. The Sounders advanced from the Knockout Round of the playoffs through a 1–0 win over Sporting Kansas City, and beat FC Dallas 4–2 on aggregate to return to the Conference Final. The Sounders then defeated the Colorado Rapids 3–1 on aggregate in the final, clinching a spot in their first-ever MLS Cup. On December 10, 2016, the Sounders defeated Toronto FC 5–4 in a penalty shootout, to win MLS Cup 2016, their first MLS championship in franchise history, going the whole match without a shot on goal. The team's performance was called a "cinderella season" and hailed as one of the most dramatic MLS seasons to date.

=== 2017: Falling short of repeat ===
The Sounders began their title defense with the signings of two academy graduates and several veteran players from MLS and abroad. Dempsey also returned from his hiatus and scored in his first match before being called up to the U.S. national team for World Cup qualification. The season began with only five wins in the first 17 matches, but was followed by a 13-match unbeaten streak and additional wins to clinch a second-place spot in the Western Conference. In the playoffs, the Sounders beat the Vancouver Whitecaps and Houston Dynamo to win the Western Conference and return to the MLS Cup, once again facing Toronto at BMO Field. Seattle lost 2–0 to Toronto, who clinched the first domestic treble in MLS history. During the press conference following the loss, Schmetzer publicly set a goal for the Sounders to host an MLS Cup final in Seattle, which would be accomplished two seasons later.

=== 2018: Longest winning streak ===
Seattle began the 2018 season with a run to the quarterfinals of the CONCACAF Champions League, where they lost 3–1 on aggregate to eventual champions C.D. Guadalajara. During the Round of 16, Jordan Morris injured his ACL and was deemed unfit to play for the rest of the season. Without Morris and several injured starting players, the Sounders lost nine of their first 15 matches and were placed bottom of the Western Conference by June. The club signed a new Designated Player, Peruvian forward Raúl Ruidíaz, that month and began a long unbeaten streak that resulted in a playoff position in late August.

On September 1, the club broke the MLS record for most consecutive wins in the post-shootout era, having won eight consecutive matches. They then extended that win streak to nine games as they beat Vancouver 2–1 on September 15, before eventually losing to the Philadelphia Union on September 19. The Sounders finished second in the Western Conference with 18 wins, 11 losses, and 5 draws. With 14 wins in the final 16 matches of the season, the Sounders completed the best half season in league history. Minority owner Paul Allen died from complications related to non-Hodgkin lymphoma on October 15, 2018, leaving his stake in the Sounders to an estate executed by his sister Jody Allen. Seattle then faced the Portland Timbers in the Conference Semifinals, losing the away leg 2–1 and winning the home leg 3–2 to tie the series on aggregate after extra time. In the ensuing penalty shootout, Portland won 4–2; the home leg is considered to be one of the best playoff matches in league history due to its dramatic finish.

=== 2019: Second MLS Cup title ===
The 2019 MLS season began with the loss of team captain and inaugural season player Osvaldo Alonso, who was released into free agency and signed with Minnesota United FC before the season began. Defender Chad Marshall, who had joined in 2014, announced his retirement from professional soccer on May 22, leaving unexpectedly mid-way through the season. Despite the loss of these two players, plus the suspension of Román Torres for ten matches for testing positive for a performance-enhancing substance in August, the Sounders finished 2nd in the Western Conference and 4th in the overall league table, good enough to qualify for a spot in the 2020 CONCACAF Champions' League and a record 11th-straight appearance in the MLS Cup Playoffs.

The Sounders defeated FC Dallas 4–3 in the first round with a hat-trick from Jordan Morris, who had been named MLS Comeback Player of the Year following his return from an ACL tear. The team then won against Real Salt Lake at home and traveled away to play in the Conference Finals against Supporters' Shield winners Los Angeles FC, where they won 3–1. Seattle hosted the MLS Cup final against Toronto FC, playing them for the third time in four years, and won 3–1 to clinch their second championship. The match drew an attendance of 69,274, setting records for the team and any sporting event at CenturyLink Field.

=== 2020: Pandemic and MLS Cup runners-up ===
Seattle opened the 2020 season with the CONCACAF Champions League, where they lost in the round of 16 to C.D. Olimpia in a penalty shootout after a 4–4 aggregate draw. The Sounders played two regular season matches at home before MLS suspended all activities on March 12, 2020, due to the worsening COVID-19 pandemic, which had been affecting the Seattle area for several weeks. The league returned in the MLS is Back Tournament, played in the Orlando area, and the Sounders earned a 1–1–1 record in group play. They advanced to the round of 16, where they lost 4–1 to Los Angeles FC. The team then resumed hosting matches with no spectators at CenturyLink Field (renamed Lumen Field near the end of the season) and primarily played against West Coast teams due to limited travel.

The Sounders cancelled an away match against the LA Galaxy in August to join a multi-sport boycott to protest racial injustice. They later set a franchise record for largest margin of victory with a 7–1 home win against the San Jose Earthquakes on September 10. The team clinched their 12th consecutive playoff berth and finished second in the Western Conference. In the playoffs, the Sounders defeated Los Angeles FC and FC Dallas to host Minnesota United FC in the Western Conference Final. Minnesota took a 2–0 lead in the second half, but Seattle responded with three goals in the final 18 minutes to complete a comeback victory and secure a fourth MLS Cup appearance in five years. The Sounders faced the Columbus Crew in the 2020 MLS Cup final and lost 3–0 in front of 1,500 spectators at Mapfre Stadium on December 12—the latest calendar date to host a league match.

=== 2021: Leagues Cup runners-up ===
Seattle opened the 2021 season with a 13-match unbeaten streak, setting a new MLS record in the process, despite missing Nicolas Lodeiro, Jordan Morris, Stefan Frei, and Raul Ruidiaz to long-term injuries. Manager Brian Schmetzer switched to a 3–5–2 formation that led to only eight conceded goals during the streak. The Sounders retained the Cascadia Cup with a 2–1–1 record, including a 6–2 away victory over the Portland Timbers. The team also won twice against Mexican clubs UANL and Santos Laguna in the 2021 Leagues Cup and advanced to the final, where they lost 3–2 to Club León in Las Vegas. Seattle maintained their first place position in the Western Conference despite several losses in the summer, but fell into a winless streak over the final six matches of the season to finish second in the West. They qualified for the playoffs but were eliminated in the first round by Real Salt Lake in a penalty shootout.

=== 2022: First CONCACAF Champions League title ===
The team qualified for the 2022 CONCACAF Champions League as the best-performing MLS club without their own berth, replacing the slot reserved for the cancelled U.S. Open Cup. In the round of 16, the Sounders were held to a scoreless draw to F.C. Motagua in Honduras but defeated them 5–0 in the second leg at home. Seattle then faced Club León in a rematch of the Leagues Cup Final, winning 3–0 at home in the first leg and drawing 1–1 in the second leg to advance to the semifinals. The team played MLS Cup 2021 champions New York City FC in the semifinals, winning 3–1 at home in the first leg and drawing 1–1 in the second leg to advance 4–2 on aggregate. The Sounders advance to their first Champions League final to face Mexican club UNAM, who hosted the first leg. The two teams drew 2–2 and returned to Seattle, where the Sounders won 3–0 in front of 68,741, setting a competition attendance record. The Sounders became the first MLS club to win the CONCACAF Champions League with their 5–2 aggregate victory. As CONCACAF champions, Seattle is expected to become the first MLS club to participate in the FIFA Club World Cup.
