= Philip Lund =

Danish professional soccer player (born 1989)

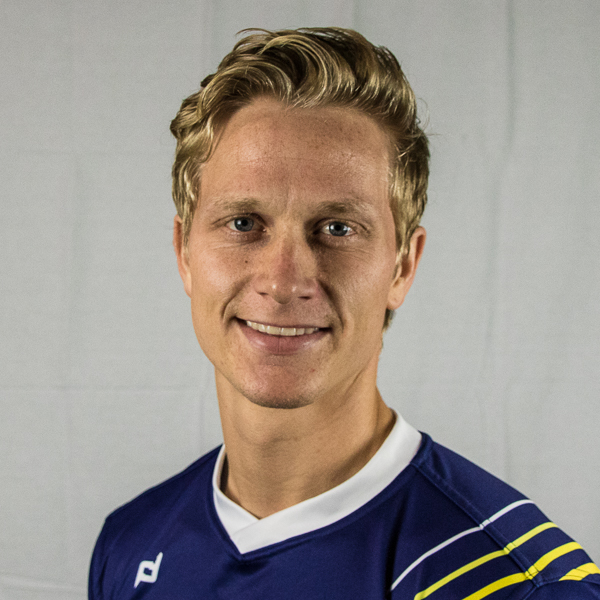

Personal information
- Date of birth: 5 September 1989 (age 37)
- Place of birth: Vejle, Denmark
- Height: 1.79 m (5 ft 10 in)
- Position: Forward

Team information
- Current team: Vancouver FC (assistant)

Youth career
- 2008–2009: Vejle BK

Senior career*
Years	Team	Apps	(Gls)
2009–2011	Vejle BK	27	(4)
2010–2011	→ Kolding FC (loan)	26	(14)
2011–2013	FC Fyn	41	(15)
2013	Seattle Sounders FC	4	(0)
2014	Oklahoma City Energy	8	(3)
2015	B36	7	(4)
2016	DRB FC	12	(4)
2016–2017	Egersunds IK	5	(6)
2017	B36	8	(2)
2017–2023	Tacoma Stars (indoor)	67	(48)

Managerial career
- 2018–20??: Seattle Sounders FC U23 (assistant)
- 2025–: Vancouver FC (assistant)
- * Club domestic league appearances and goals

Philip Lund (born 5 September 1989 in Vejle) is a Danish retired footballer and current assistant coach of Canadian Premier League club Vancouver FC.

== Club career ==
=== Denmark ===
Lund began his career with hometown club Vejle Boldklub. Between 2008 and 2011, Lund worked his way through the ranks of the club, including breaking into the senior squad for which he appeared in two Danish Superliga matches in 2009. In July 2010, Lund was loaned to Kolding FC before returning to Vejle in June 2011. After leaving Vejle in December 2011, Lund signed for FC Fyn before leaving the club in 2013. Both Kolding and Fyn played in the Danish 1st Division, the second highest division in Danish football, during Lund's time with the clubs.

=== United States ===
On 22 March it was announced that Lund had signed with Seattle Sounders FC of Major League Soccer, along with Jamaican youth international Ashani Fairclough, after impressing assistant coach Ezra Hendrickson at a player combine. Lund made his first league appearance for Seattle on 12 April 2013, coming on as a 74th-minute substitute for Steve Zakuani in a 0–0 draw with the New England Revolution. After scoring none and making 5 appearances for the club, Lund was waived by Seattle at the end of the 2013 Major League Soccer season on 25 November 2013.

Following his release from the Sounders, Lund signed with Oklahoma City Energy FC, coached by fellow-Dane Jimmy Nielsen, of the USL Pro for the 2014 season. Lund experienced a strong start to his time at OKC, which included scoring three goals in 8 appearances. In April, he was being sidelined with a hip injury which was expected to keep him out for 8 months.

=== Faroe Islands ===
After being released from Oklahoma City, Lund went on trial with his former club Vejle BK in Denmark. On 22 July 2015, Lund signed a one-year contract for B36 Torshavn of the Effodeildin. He was released after the conclusion of the 2015 Faroe Islands Premier League season. He scored a total of 4 goals in 18 league appearances for the club.

== Coaching career ==
After his playing career, Lund worked as an assistant coach for the Seattle Sounders FC U23 team for a few years. Beside that, he was also playing indoor soccer for Tacoma Stars.

In the later years, he also worked as a football coach at Eastside Catholic School.

In February 2025, Lund was named assistant coach of Canadian Premier League club Vancouver FC.

== Personal ==
Lund has a twin brother named Mitchell.
