= Alex Caskey =

American soccer player (born 1988)

Personal information
- Full name: Alexander Caskey
- Date of birth: July 22, 1988 (age 38)
- Place of birth: Dunwoody, Georgia, United States
- Height: 5 ft 10 in (1.78 m)
- Position: Midfielder

Youth career
- 2002–2007: Forsyth Fusion

College career
| Years | Team | Apps | (Gls) |
| 2007–2010 | Davidson Wildcats | 76 | (19) |

Senior career*
| Years | Team | Apps | (Gls) |
| 2009–2010 | Atlanta Blackhawks | 22 | (1) |
| 2011 | Charleston Battery | 19 | (1) |
| 2012–2013 | Seattle Sounders FC | 30 | (1) |
| 2014 | D.C. United | 11 | (0) |
| 2014 | → Richmond Kickers (loan) | 1 | (0) |
| Total | | 83 | (3) |
- * Club domestic league appearances and goals as of November 3, 2014

Alexander Caskey (born July 22, 1988) is an American former professional soccer player.

== Career ==
=== College and amateur ===
Caskey played college soccer at Davidson College for four seasons where he was a three-time All-Southern Conference first team selection and a two-time NSCAA All-South Region second team selection. He was twice selected to the North Carolina Collegiate Sports Information Association All-State first team. A two-year team captain, Caskey finished his Davidson career with 19 goals and 15 assists for 53 points and did not miss a single match, starting all 76. He was also named to the Soccer America and College Soccer News national Teams of the Week and was a Southern Conference Player of the month and of the week.

Caskey also spent 2 seasons with the Atlanta Blackhawks of the USL Premier Development League.

=== Professional ===
On January 13, 2011, Caskey was drafted in the third round (47th overall) by Seattle Sounders FC in the 2011 MLS SuperDraft. He was later cut on January 31, 2011, before training season.

Caskey signed with Charleston Battery of the USL Pro league on March 29, 2011, and made his professional debut on April 9 in a game against the Charlotte Eagles. He scored his first goal as a professional, a game-winning header, on July 9, 2011.

Caskey signed with Seattle Sounders FC on March 13, 2012, getting his first start on April 14 against the Colorado Rapids. He scored his first goal in a 4–0 rout of the LA Galaxy.

He was traded to D.C. United in March 2014 in exchange for a third-round pick in the 2016 MLS SuperDraft.

After the 2014 season, Caskey was released by D.C. United.

== Career statistics ==
| Club performance | | | League | | Cup | | League Cup | | Continental | | Total | |
| Season | Club | League | Apps | Goals | Apps | Goals | Apps | Goals | Apps | Goals | Apps | Goals |
| USA | | | League | | Open Cup | | League Cup | | North America | | Total | |
|---|---|---|---|---|---|---|---|---|---|---|---|---|
| 2009 | Atlanta Blackhawks | USL Premier Development League | 14 | 0 | 0 | 0 | 0 | 0 | 0 | 0 | 14 | 0 |
| 2010 | Atlanta Blackhawks | USL Premier Development League | 8 | 1 | 0 | 0 | 0 | 0 | 0 | 0 | 8 | 1 |
| 2011 | Charleston Battery | USL Pro | 19 | 1 | 2 | 0 | 1 | 0 | 0 | 0 | 22 | 1 |
| 2012 | Seattle Sounders FC | Major League Soccer | 20 | 1 | 4 | 1 | 1 | 0 | 4 | 1 | 29 | 3 |
| 2013 | Seattle Sounders FC | Major League Soccer | 10 | 0 | 1 | 0 | 0 | 0 | 3 | 0 | 14 | 0 |
| 2014 | D.C. United | Major League Soccer | 6 | 0 | 0 | 0 | 0 | 0 | 0 | 0 | 6 | 0 |
| Total | USA | | 77 | 3 | 7 | 1 | 2 | 0 | 7 | 1 | 93 | 5 |
| Career total | | | 77 | 3 | 7 | 1 | 2 | 0 | 7 | 1 | 93 | 5 |
