= Ashani Fairclough =

Jamaican footballer (born 1992)

Personal information
- Date of birth: August 7, 1992 (age 34)
- Place of birth: Portmore, Jamaica
- Height: 6 ft 2 in (1.88 m)
- Position: Defender

College career
Years	Team	Apps	(Gls)
2009–2012	South Florida Bulls	78	(2)

Senior career*
Years	Team	Apps	(Gls)
2012	VSI Tampa Flames	5	(0)
2013	Seattle Sounders FC	0	(0)
2014–2015	Wilmington Hammerheads	32	(3)
2015	Seattle Sounders FC 2	12	(1)
2016	Wilmington Hammerheads	24	(5)
2017	Charlotte Independence	1	(0)

International career^{‡}
- Jamaica U17
- Jamaica U20

Managerial career
- 2024–: Tampa Bay Sun (assistant)
- * Club domestic league appearances and goals as of October 18, 2017 ‡ National team caps and goals as of July 7, 2010

Ashani Fairclough (born August 7, 1992) is a Jamaican retired professional footballer who is currently an assistant coach for USL Super League club Tampa Bay Sun.

== Career ==
=== Early career ===
Fairclough captained his country's team at Under-17 level in 2007 at the age of fifteen. A year later, he was recruited by various college scouts and chose to attend the University of South Florida. He is one of the youngest Jamaican athletes ever to go to college at just sixteen years old.

=== College and amateur ===
Fairclough played four years of college soccer for the South Florida Bulls between 2009 and 2012. While he was at college, Fairclough also appeared for USL PDL club VSI Tampa Flames during their 2012 season.

=== Professional ===
Fairclough wasn't drafted in the 2013 MLS SuperDraft, but signed with Major League Soccer's Seattle Sounders FC on March 22, 2013, after a strong pre-season on trial. However, he was waived by Seattle on June 27, 2013, without ever making a first-team appearance.

Fairclough signed with USL Pro club Wilmington Hammerheads on April 2, 2014. Fairclough was named to the USL Pro team of the week on May 6, 2014. At the end of 2014 USL PRO season, Fairclough was named to the USL PRO first team of the year.

== International ==
Fairclough was a member of the 2009 Jamaica national U20 team.

== Coaching ==
In 2024, Fairclough joined the staff of the Tampa Bay Sun ahead of the inaugural USL Super League season.

== Honors ==
=== Individual ===
- USL Pro All-League First Team: 2014
