= Leonardo González (Costa Rican footballer) =

Costa Rican footballer (born 1980)

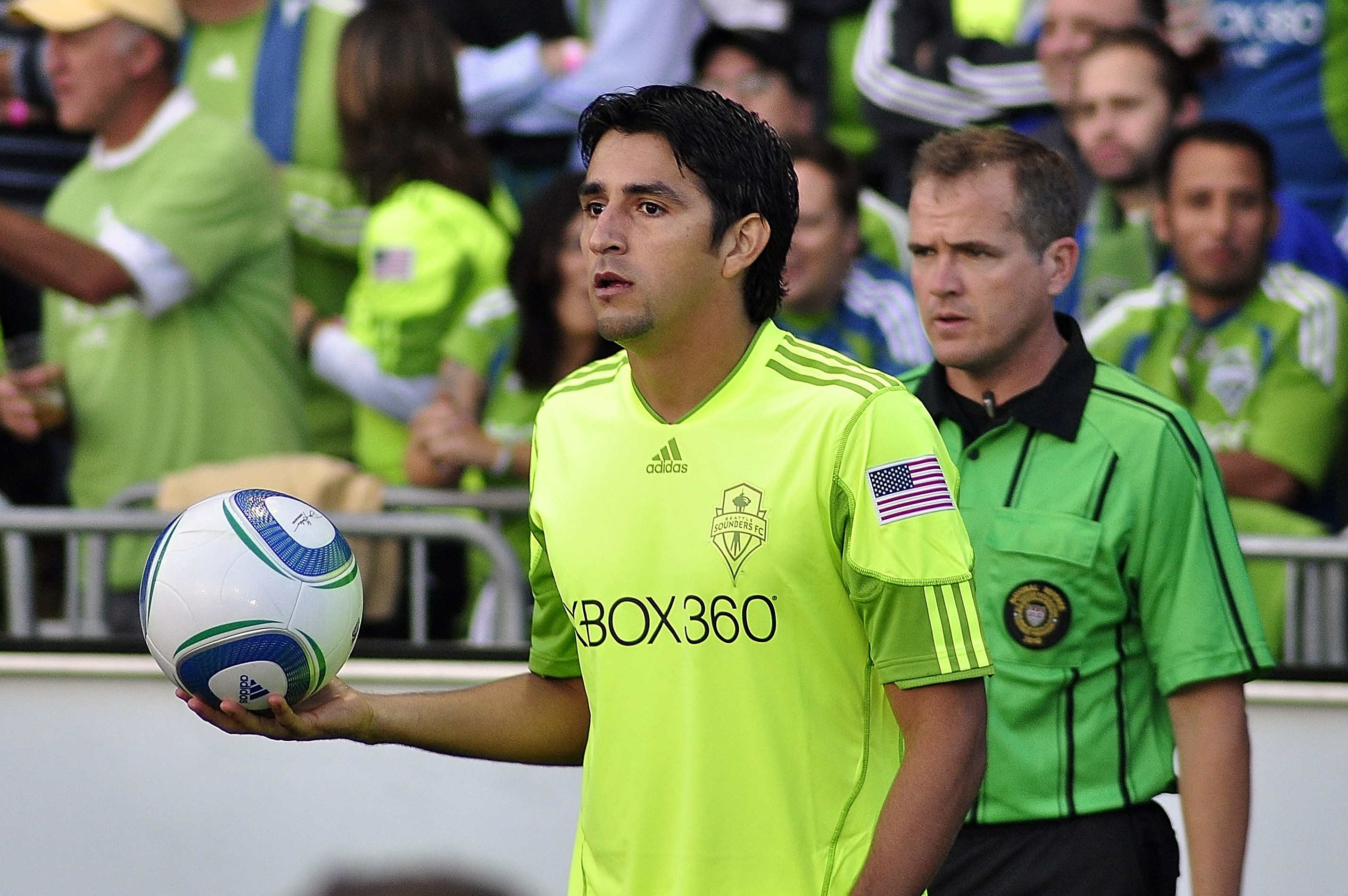
- González with Seattle Sounders FC

Personal information
- Full name: Leonardo González Arce
- Date of birth: November 21, 1980 (age 45)
- Place of birth: San José, Costa Rica
- Height: 1.86 m (6 ft 1 in)
- Position: Leftback

Senior career*
Years	Team	Apps	(Gls)
2000–2008	Herediano	154	(3)
2009	Municipal Liberia	4	(0)
2009–2015	Seattle Sounders FC	133	(2)
2016–2019	Herediano	50	(0)
Total		341	(5)

International career
2002–2009	Costa Rica	61	(1)
- * Club domestic league appearances and goals

Leonardo González Arce (born November 21, 1980) is a Costa Rican former professional footballer who played as a defender.

== Career ==
=== Club ===
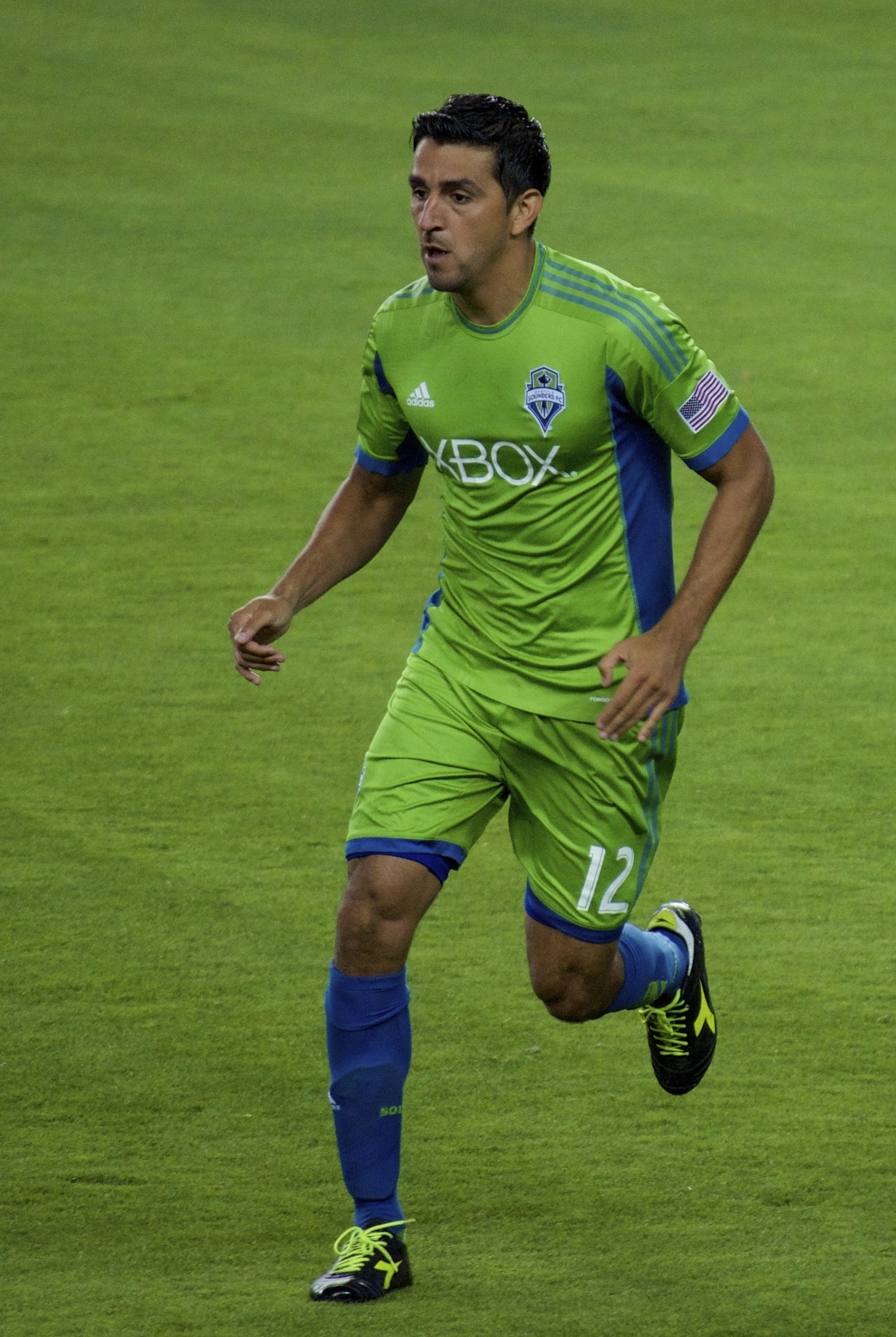
Playing for the Seattle Sounders in 2014

González made his professional debut for Herediano on September 24, 2000, against Puntarenas and scored his first league goal on August 4, 2002, against Carmelita. González was an important player for Herediano, appearing in 154 league matches and scoring 3 goals in nine years at the club. He stayed with the team until his transfer to Municipal Liberia, also known as Liberia Mia in early 2009. On July 2, 2009, it was announced that he was signed to Seattle Sounders FC of Major League Soccer.

Upon signing González, Coach Sigi Schmid said, “It’s nice to have a naturally left-footed player. He can play left back, play center back in a pinch, and he can also play wide and run the whole line for us. He is an attacking left fullback with good size and athleticism. He’s very willing to get forward out of a defensive position and does a good job defensively.”

González stayed with Seattle through the end of the 2015 MLS season. On December 22, 2015, González signed with Herediano, his original Costa Rican club.

=== International ===
González made his debut for Costa Rica in a November 2002 friendly match against Ecuador and earned a total of 61 caps, scoring 1 goal. He represented his country in 15 FIFA World Cup qualification matches and played at the 2006 FIFA World Cup as well as the 2003, 2007 and 2009 CONCACAF Gold Cups. He was also selected to play in the UNCAF Nations Cup 2007, where he scored against Honduras.

His final international was a July 2009 CONCACAF Gold Cup match against El Salvador.

=== International goals ===
#	Date	Venue	Opponent	Score	Result	Competition
1	February 9, 2007	Estadio Cuscatlán, San Salvador, El Salvador	Honduras	2 – 0	3 – 1	UNCAF Nations Cup 2007

== Personal life ==
González is married to Alejandra Abarca Hernández and they have two children.

González received his U.S. green card in March 2011. This qualifies him as a domestic player for MLS roster purposes.

== Honors ==
=== Costa Rica ===
- UNCAF Nations Cup (1): 2007

=== Municipal Liberia ===
- Primera División de Costa Rica (1): Verano 2009

=== Club Sport Herediano ===
- Primera División de Costa Rica (1): Verano 2016

=== Seattle Sounders FC ===
- Lamar Hunt U.S. Open Cup (3): 2009, 2010, 2011, 2014
- MLS Supporters' Shield: 2014
