= 2012 Seattle Sounders FC season =

American soccer team season

Seattle Sounders FC
2012 season
- General manager: Adrian Hanauer
- Manager: Sigi Schmid
- Stadium: CenturyLink Field
- Major League Soccer: Conference: 3rd Overall: 7th
- MLS Cup playoffs: Conference final
- U.S. Open Cup: Runners-up
- CONCACAF Champions League (2011–12): Quarterfinals
- CONCACAF Champions League (2012–13): Semifinals
- Top goalscorer: League: Eddie Johnson (14 goals); All: Eddie Johnson (17 goals); Fredy Montero (17 goals)
- Highest home attendance: 66,452 (Oct. 7 vs. Portland)
- Lowest home attendance: 7,767 (Aug. 2 vs. Caledonia, CCL)
- Average home league attendance: League: 43,144; Playoffs: 39,758; All: 42,751
- Biggest win: League: 4–0 vs. LA Galaxy (Aug. 5); 6–2 at Chivas USA (Aug. 25)
- Biggest defeat: League: 1–4 at Montreal (Jun. 16); CCL: 1–6 at Santos Laguna (Mar. 14)
Home colors	Away colors	Third colors

The 2012 Seattle Sounders FC season was the club's fourth season in Major League Soccer, the United States' top-tier of professional soccer. For the Sounders FC organization, it was their fourth year of existence, and including all previous clubs, it was the 32nd season of a soccer team bearing the Sounders name.

== Season overview ==
=== Pre-season ===
On November 23, 2011, James Riley was drafted away from Seattle by the Montreal Impact as part of the 2011 MLS Expansion Draft. He was immediately traded to Chivas USA with allocation money for Justin Braun and Gerson Mayen. The Sounders also traded Tyson Wahl to the Impact for allocation money. Other off-season transactions included the transfer of Erik Friberg to Malmö FF, the retirements of Kasey Keller, Terry Boss, and Taylor Graham, the release of Nate Jaqua and Pat Noonan, the acquisition of Marc Burch from D.C. United via the 2011 MLS Re-Entry Draft, and the signings of out of contract players Michael Gspurning and Adam Johansson.

In the 2012 MLS SuperDraft, the Sounders took Creighton University defender Andrew Duran in the first round and University of Alabama-Birmingham forward Babayele Sodade. A week later, in the 2012 MLS Supplemental Draft the Sounders took University of California-Santa Barbara defender Tim Pontius and former Leicester City F.C. forward Jason Banton in the second round, University of Washington forward Abdul Aman in the third round, and Cal Poly defender Wes Feighner in the fourth round. On the same day as the Supplemental Draft, the Sounders traded the rights to defender Leone Cruz, whom the Sounders acquired in the second round of the 2011 MLS SuperDraft but did not sign to a contract, to Real Salt Lake for UCLA defender Andy Rose, whom Real Salt Lake had drafted in the first round of the Supplemental Draft.

=== Summary ===
The Sounders played 50 matches during the 2012 season across all competitions and including major friendlies—the most in the team's history. They had a record of 26 wins, 11 losses, and 13 draws overall.

== Club ==
=== Coaching staff ===
Position	Staff
Head coach	Sigi Schmid
Assistant coaches	Brian Schmetzer, Ezra Hendrickson
Goalkeepers Coach	Tom Dutra
Fitness coach	David Tenney
Equipment manager	Nolan Meyer

=== Other information ===
Majority Owner	Joe Roth
Owner & General Manager	Adrian Hanauer
Owner & Founder and Chairman, Vulcan Inc.	Paul Allen
President	Peter McLoughlin
Owner	Drew Carey
Director of First Team	Grant Clark
Assistant Athletic Trainer	Chris Cornish
Chiropractors	Lew Estabrook, DC, Forrest Hartford, DC
Team Services Director	Vince Johnson
Medical Director	Dr. Michael Morris
Head Athletic Trainer	Randy Noteboom
Director of Youth Development	Darren Sawatzky
Voice of the Sounders FC	Ross Fletcher, Kasey Keller
Ground (capacity and dimensions)	CenturyLink Field (67,000 / 104x68m)
Training ground (capacity and dimensions)	Starfire Sports Complex (4,500 / 101x64m)

Source: Staff, Organization,

=== Official sponsors ===
- Xbox 360
- Adidas
- Samsung Mob!le
- Seattle Bank
- Virginia Mason Medical Center
- Root Sports

Source: Soundersfc.com

=== Kits ===
Home	Home Alternate	Home Alt. 2	Away	Third

Type	Shirt	Shorts	Socks	First appearance / Info
Home	Rave Green	Blue	Rave Green	
Home Alt.	Rave Green	Rave Green	Blue	MLS, April 7 against D.C. United
Home Alt. 2	Rave Green	Rave Green	Rave Green	MLS, April 28 against Chicago
Away	Shale	Shale	Shale	
Third	Cyan	Cyan	Cyan	→ International friendlies and non-MLS matches

== Squad ==
=== Current squad ===
Note: Flags indicate national team as defined under FIFA eligibility rules; some limited exceptions apply. Players may hold more than one non-FIFA nationality. Squad correct as of October 3, 2012.

No.	Pos.	Nation	Player
1	GK	AUT	Michael Gspurning
3	MF	USA	Brad Evans
4	DF	USA	Patrick Ianni
5	DF	SWE	Adam Johansson
6	MF	CUB	Osvaldo Alonso (Vice-Captain)
7	FW	USA	Eddie Johnson
8	DF	USA	Marc Burch
10	MF	ARG	Mauro Rosales (DP / Captain)
11	MF	COD	Steve Zakuani
12	DF	CRC	Leonardo González
13	MF	GER	Christian Tiffert (DP)
14	MF	GHA	Michael Tetteh (GA)
15	MF	HON	Mario Martínez (on loan from Real España)
16	FW	USA	David Estrada
17	FW	COL	Fredy Montero (DP / 3rd captain)
19	FW	CAN	Babayele Sodade
20	DF	USA	Zach Scott (4th captain)
21	FW	TTO	Cordell Cato
22	MF	USA	Mike Seamon
23	MF	USA	Servando Carrasco
24	GK	USA	Marcus Hahnemann
25	MF	ENG	Andy Rose
26	FW	USA	Sammy Ochoa
27	MF	USA	Alex Caskey
29	GK	USA	Josh Ford
30	DF	USA	Andrew Duran
31	DF	USA	Jeff Parke
32	DF	USA	Daniel Steres
33	GK	USA	Andrew Weber
34	DF	COL	Jhon Kennedy Hurtado
35	GK	USA	Bryan Meredith

=== Squad information ===
As of November 18, 2012.

No.	Name	Nationality	Position(s)	Date of birth (age)	Signed from	Club appearances (MLS) [playoffs]	Club goals (MLS) [playoffs]
Goalkeepers
1	Michael Gspurning	(Austria)	GK	May 2, 1981 (aged 31)	(Greece) Skoda Xanthi	30 (21) [4]	0 (0) [0]
24	Marcus Hahnemann	(United States)	GK	June 15, 1972 (aged 40)	(England) Everton	1 (0) [0]	0 (0) [0]
29	Josh Ford	(United States)	GK	November 6, 1987 (aged 25)	(United States) UConn	0 (0) [0]	0 (0) [0]
33	Andrew Weber	(United States)	GK	August 9, 1983 (aged 29)	(United States) San Jose	5 (3) [0]	0 (0) [0]
35	Bryan Meredith	(United States)	GK	August 2, 1989 (aged 23)	(United States) Monmouth	16 (12) [0]	0 (0) [0]
Defenders
4	Patrick Ianni	(United States)	CB	June 15, 1985 (aged 27)	(United States) Houston	98 (74) [3]	3 (3) [0]
5	Adam Johansson	(Sweden)	RFB	February 21, 1983 (aged 29)	(Sweden) IFK Göteborg	28 (21) [4]	0 (0) [0]
8	Marc Burch	(United States)	LFB / CB	May 7, 1984 (aged 28)	(United States) D.C. United	40 (29) [2]	0 (0) [0]
12	Leonardo González	(Costa Rica)	LFB	November 21, 1980 (aged 32)	(Costa Rica) Municipal Liberia	103 (71) [6]	1 (1) [0]
20	Zach Scott	(United States)	CB / RFB	July 2, 1980 (aged 32)	(United States) Seattle (USL)	74 (45) [4]	3 (1) [1]
30	Andrew Duran	(United States)	CB	October 26, 1989 (aged 23)	(United States) Creighton	0 (0) [0]	0 (0) [0]
31	Jeff Parke	(United States)	CB	April 13, 1982 (aged 30)	(Canada) Vancouver	105 (78) [7]	1 (1) [0]
32	Daniel Steres	(United States)	CB	November 11, 1990 (aged 22)	(United States) San Diego State	0 (0) [0]	0 (0) [0]
34	Jhon Kennedy Hurtado	(Colombia)	CB	May 16, 1984 (aged 28)	(Colombia) Deportivo Cali	112 (81) [8]	1 (1) [0]
Midfielders
3	Brad Evans	(United States)	CM / RM	May 20, 1985 (aged 27)	(United States) Columbus	108 (88) [8]	17 (13) [0]
6	Osvaldo Alonso	(Cuba)	DM	November 11, 1985 (aged 27)	(United States) Charleston	151 (113) [10]	14 (6) [1]
10	Mauro Rosales (C)	(Argentina)	AM / RM	February 24, 1981 (aged 31)	(Argentina) River Plate	62 (53) [2]	8 (8) [0]
11	Steve Zakuani	(Democratic Republic of the Congo)	LM	February 9, 1988 (aged 24)	(United States) Akron	90 (72) [7]	19 (17) [1]
13	Christian Tiffert	(Germany)	CM	February 18, 1982 (aged 30)	(Germany) 1. FC Kaiserslautern	18 (12) [4]	0 (0) [0]
14	Michael Tetteh	(Ghana)	LM / LFB	January 16, 1989 (aged 23)	(United States) UCSB	1 (0) [0]	0 (0) [0]
15	Mario Martínez (on loan from Real España)	(Honduras)	AM / LM	July 30, 1989 (aged 23)	(Honduras) Real España	10 (3) [4]	1 (0) [1]
22	Mike Seamon	(United States)	CM	August 30, 1988 (aged 24)	(United States) Villanova	21 (9) [0]	0 (0) [0]
23	Servando Carrasco	(United States)	CM / RM	August 13, 1988 (aged 24)	(United States) California	34 (21) [0]	0 (0) [0]
25	Andy Rose	(England)	CM	February 13, 1990 (aged 22)	(United States) Salt Lake	33 (23) [2]	4 (1) [0]
27	Alex Caskey	(United States)	CM / LM	July 22, 1988 (aged 24)	(United States) Charleston	29 (20) [1]	3 (1) [0]
Forwards
7	Eddie Johnson	(United States)	ST	March 31, 1984 (aged 28)	(England) Fulham	38 (28) [3]	17 (14) [1]
16	David Estrada	(United States)	ST / RM	February 4, 1988 (aged 24)	(United States) UCLA	37 (23) [3]	7 (5) [0]
17	Fredy Montero	(Colombia)	ST	July 26, 1987 (aged 25)	(Colombia) Deportivo Cali	160 (119) [10]	60 (47) [0]
19	Babayele Sodade	(Canada)	ST	July 26, 1990 (aged 22)	(United States) UAB	0 (0) [0]	0 (0) [0]
21	Cordell Cato	(Trinidad and Tobago)	ST / RM	July 15, 1992 (aged 20)	(Trinidad and Tobago) Defence Force	15 (8) [0]	1 (0) [0]
26	Sammy Ochoa	(United States)	ST	September 4, 1986 (aged 26)	(Mexico) Estudiantes Tecos	27 (13) [3]	10 (3) [0]

== Player movement ==
=== Transfers ===
==== In ====
Number	Position	Player	Transferred from	Notes	Date	Source
32	MF	(Colombia) Miguel Montaño	(Canada) Montreal Impact	End loan deal	November 21, 2011	
1	GK	(Austria) Michael Gspurning	(Greece) Skoda Xanthi	Free	December 7, 2011	
8	DF	(United States) Marc Burch	(United States) D.C. United	Re-Entry Draft	December 12, 2011	
5	DF	(Sweden) Adam Johansson	(Sweden) IFK Göteborg	Free	December 29, 2011	
28	MF	(Denmark) Christian Sivebæk	(Denmark) FC Midtjylland	Undisclosed	January 11	
21	FW	(Trinidad and Tobago) Cordell Cato	(Trinidad and Tobago) Defence Force F.C.	Undisclosed	January 18	
7	FW	(United States) Eddie Johnson	(Mexico) Puebla F.C.	Selected by Montreal Impact via allocation process, traded in exchange for Mike Fucito and Lamar Neagle	February 17	
30	DF	(United States) Andrew Duran	(United States) Creighton Bluejays (United States) Des Moines Menace	SuperDraft, joined after pre-season training camp	March 1	
19	FW	(Canada) Babayele Sodade	(United States) UAB Blazers (United States) Michigan Bucks	SuperDraft, joined after pre-season training camp	March 1	
33	GK	(United States) Andrew Weber	Unattached	Free, released by San Jose, joined after pre-season training camp	March 2	
25	MF	(England) Andy Rose	(United States) Real Salt Lake	Supplemental Draft, traded in exchange for Leone Cruz, joined after pre-season training camp	March 13	
27	MF	(United States) Alex Caskey	(United States) Charleston Battery	Free, selected by Seattle in the 2011 SuperDraft, joined after pre-season training camp	March 13	
32	DF	(United States) Daniel Steres	(United States) San Diego State Aztecs	Supplemental Draft, selected by Chivas USA, played for Sounders Reserses (March – April), selected in Waiver Draft (June 6)	June 22	
13	MF	(Germany) Christian Tiffert	(Germany) 1. FC Kaiserslautern	Undisclosed	July 27	
24	GK	(United States) Marcus Hahnemann	Unattached	Free, selected via allocation process, Seattle acquired the No. 1 selection from Toronto FC in exchange for a conditional draft pick selection	September 14	

==== Loan in ====
Date from	Date to	Player	Position	Transferred from	Fee/notes	Ref
August 1	End of season	(Honduras) Mario Martínez	MF	(Honduras) Real España	End of season loan deal	

===== On trial =====
Number	Position	Player	Transferred from	Notes	Date	Source

==== Out ====
Number	Position	Player	Transferred to	Notes	Date	Source
18	GK	(United States) Kasey Keller	Unattached	Retired	November 2, 2011	
7	DF	(United States) James Riley	(Canada) Montreal Impact	Expansion Draft	November 23, 2011	
5	DF	(United States) Tyson Wahl	(Canada) Montreal Impact	Traded in exchange for allocation money	November 23, 2011	
28	GK	(Puerto Rico) Terry Boss	Unattached	Retired	December 2, 2011	
26	DF	(United States) Taylor Graham	Unattached	Retired	December 2, 2011	
32	MF	(Colombia) Miguel Montaño	(Canada) Montreal Impact	Free	December 7, 2011	
21	FW	(United States) Nate Jaqua	(United States) New England Revolution	Re-Entry Draft	December 12, 2011	
25	FW	(United States) Pat Noonan	(United States) Los Angeles Galaxy	Re-Entry Draft	December 12, 2011	
8	MF	(Sweden) Erik Friberg	(Sweden) Malmö FF	Undisclosed	December 12, 2011	
--	DF	(United States) Leone Cruz	(United States) Real Salt Lake	Traded in exchange for Andy Rose	January 17	
2	FW	(United States) Mike Fucito	(Canada) Montreal Impact	Traded in exchange for Eddie Johnson	February 17	
27	MF	(United States) Lamar Neagle	(Canada) Montreal Impact	Traded in exchange for Eddie Johnson	February 17	
13	FW	(Jamaica) O'Brian White	Unattached	Released, Seattle Buys out his contract	March 22	
--	MF	(The Gambia) Amadou Sanyang	(United States) Charleston Battery	Released, in Chicago Fire preseason camp	April 6	
28	MF	(Denmark) Christian Sivebæk	(Denmark) Vejle Kolding	Waived by mutual agreement	June 22	
24	FW	(United States) Roger Levesque	Unattached	Retired	July 18	
15	MF	(Uruguay) Álvaro Fernández	(United States) Chicago Fire	Traded in exchange for allocation money	July 27	

==== Loan out ====
Date from	Date to	Player	Position	Destination club	Fee/notes	Ref
June 15	August 17	(United States) Andrew Duran	DF	(United States) Atlanta Silverbacks	Returned after ACL injury	
August 24	October 3	(Ghana) Michael Tetteh	MF	(United States) Fort Lauderdale Strikers	End of season loan deal	

===== On trial =====
Number	Position	Player	Transferred to	Notes	Date	Source

===== No longer on trial =====
Number	Position	Player	Transferred to	Notes	Date	Source
--	GK	(United States) Tyrel Lacey	Unattached	Out of contract, First phase of camp	January 30	
--	MF	(South Korea) Park Cheun-Yong	(United States) Los Angeles Blues	First phase of camp	January 30	
40	DF	(Honduras) Ever Alvarado	(Honduras) Real España	Left Back, Second phase of camp	February 10	
38	MF	(Jamaica) Andrew Vanzie	(Jamaica) Portmore United F.C.	Four week trial, Second phase of camp	February 10	
--	GK	(United States) Chris Blais	Unattached	SuperDraft, Cut by San Jose, Third phase of camp	February 18	
45	DF	(Honduras) Harlinton Gutiérrez	(Honduras) Real España	Centre Back, Second & Third phase of camp	February 26	
--	GK	(United States) Brian Rowe	(United States) UCLA Bruins	Played for Sounders Reserses (April 16)	April 16	
--	GK	(United States) Steve Spangler	(United States) Oregon State Beavers	Played for Sounders Reserves (April 23)	June 1	
--	MF	(United States) Sean Morris	(United States) Portland Timbers U23's	2011 Supplemental Draft, Played for Sounders Reserves (March–April)	June 1	
--	MF	(United States) Jonathan Prieto	Unattached	First phase of camp, Played for Sounders Reserves (April)	June 1	
--	MF	(United States) Armando Ochoa	--	Played for Sounders Reserves (April)	June 1	
--	DF	(United States) Michael Gallagher	(United States) Seattle Sounders FC U18	Played for Sounders Reserves (June 1)	August 12	
--	MF	(United States) Aaron Kovar	(United States) Seattle Sounders FC U18	Played for Sounders Reserves (June 1)	August 12	
--	DF	Junior Bergueos	--	Played for Sounders Reserves (August 12)	August 19	
--	MF	(United States) Angel Ayala	(United States) Cerritos College	Played for Sounders Reserves (August 12)	August 19	
--	DF	(United States) Kyle Bjornethun	(United States) Seattle Sounders FC U18	Played for Sounders Reserves (August)	September 9	
--	MF	(United States) Moisés Orozco	(Mexico) Tigres de la UANL	Played for Sounders Reserves (August 19)	September 9	
--	FW	(Jamaica) Dawyne Smith	(United States) Pittsburgh Riverhounds	Supplemental Draft, selected by New England Revolution, selected in Waiver Draft (June 6), played for Sounders Reserves (August 19)	September 9	
40	DF	(Romania) George Ogăraru	Unattached	Played for Sounders Reserves (September 9)	September 16	
41	MF	(United States) Seth C'deBaca	(United States) Pittsburgh Riverhounds	Played for Sounders Reserves (September 9)	September 16	
43	FW	(Iceland) Eiður Guðjohnsen	(Belgium) Cercle Brugge	Played for Sounders Reserves (September 9)	September 16	
--	FW	(United States) Darwin Jones	(United States) Seattle Sounders FC U-23 (United States) Washington Huskies	First phase of camp, at practice in September	September 16	
--	DF	(United States) Jacob Beck	(United States) Seattle Sounders FC U18	Played for Sounders Reserves (June & September)	September 23	
--	FW	(United States) Isidro Prado-Huerta	(United States) Seattle Sounders FC U18	Played for Sounders Reserves (August & September)	September 23	
--	DF	(United States) Jalen Markey	(United States) Seattle Sounders FC U18	Played for Sounders Reserves (September 23)	September 26	
--	DF	(United States) Kenny Mueller	Unattached	Played for Sounders Reserves (September 23)	September 26	
--	MF	(United States) Duncan McCormick	(United States) Seattle Sounders FC U18	Played for Sounders Reserves (September)	September 26	
--	MF	(United States) Henry Wingo	(United States) Seattle Sounders FC U18	Played for Sounders Reserves (September 23)	September 26	
--	FW	(United States) Dominique Dismuke	(United States) Seattle Sounders FC U18 (United States) Washington Huskies	Played for Sounders Reserves (June – September)	September 26	
--	FW	(United States) Jordan Morris	(United States) Seattle Sounders FC U18 (United States) Eastside FC	Played for Sounders Reserves (August & September)	September 26	

===== Unsigned draft picks =====
Number	Position	Player	Transferred from	Transferred to	Notes	Date (In)	Date (Out)	Source
--	FW	(Ethiopia) Abdul Aman	(United States) Washington Huskies	(United States) North Sound SeaWolves (United States) Washington Huskies	Supplemental Draft, First phase of camp	January 17	January 30	
42	DF	(United States) Tim Pontius	(United States) UC Santa Barbara	(United States) Ventura County Fusion	Supplemental Draft, First & Second phase of camp	January 17	February 10	
44	DF	(United States) Wes Feighner	(United States) Cal Poly (United States) Orange County Blue Star	Unattached	Supplemental Draft, First & Second phase of camp	January 17	February 10	
39	MF	(England) Jason Banton	(England) Leicester City	(England) Crystal Palace	Supplemental Draft, First & Second phase of camp	January 17	February 10	

== Match results ==
Win Tie Loss

=== Pre-season ===
February 6, 2012	Seattle Sounders FC	1–1	Vancouver Whitecaps FC	Casa Grande, Arizona
15:00 PST, 45' x 45' x 30' Training Game	Parke (yellow card) 20'; Carrasco 48'; Ochoa (yellow card) 74'; Caskey (yellow card) 94'; Vanzie (yellow card) 101'; Banton (red card) 118'; Gutiérrez (yellow card) 120'	Report	Camilo 1'; Harris (yellow card) 4'; Bonjour (yellow card) 14'; Boxall (yellow card) 77'; Teibert (yellow card) 103'; Cregg (yellow card) 110'	Stadium: Grande Sports World; Attendance: ~100

February 13, 2012	Orlando City SC	1–1	Seattle Sounders FC	Bradenton, Florida
13:00 PST, 30' x 30' x 30' Training Game	Chin 27'; (red card) 61'; (yellow card) 85'	Report	Ochoa 53'; Seamon (yellow card) 55'	Stadium: IMG Academy

February 15, 2012	Seattle Sounders FC	2–0	Columbus Crew	Bradenton, Florida
08:00 PST, 45' x 45' x 30' Training Game	Hurtado (yellow card) 10' (yellow-red card) 13'; Alonso (yellow card) 12'; Montero 54'; Gonzalez (yellow card) 68'; Sanyang (red card) 82'; Cato 114'	Report	Anor (yellow card) 29'; Tchani (yellow card) 38'; Anor (red card) 60'; Heinemann (yellow card) 118'	Stadium: IMG Academy

February 16, 2012	United States U-17	0–3	Seattle Sounders FC	Bradenton, Florida
07:00 PST, 35' x 35' Training Game	Requejo Jr. (yellow card) 5'	Report	Estrada 24'; Ochoa 32'; Scott 34'	Stadium: IMG Academy

February 19, 2012	FGCU Eagles	0–5	Seattle Sounders FC	Bradenton, Florida
13:00 PST, 30' x 30' x 30' Training Game		Report	Johnson 11'; Sivebæk 14' (pen.); Estrada 28'; Trialist 73'; 84' (o.g.)	Stadium: IMG Academy

February 22, 2012	Atlante	2–5	Seattle Sounders FC	Cancún, Mexico
15:00PST, Training Game	(red card) 42'; 47'; (yellow card) 54'; 80'	Report	Estrada 12'; Montero 16', 55'; Rosales (yellow card) 42'; Fernandez (red card) 42'; Sivebæk 67'; Gonzalez 71'	Stadium: Atlante Training Field

==== Seattle Sounders FC Community Shield ====
February 29, 2012 3rd Edition	Seattle Sounders FC	2–0	Chiapas	Seattle, Washington
19:00 PST	Montero 61', 73'; González (yellow card) 76'	Report	Fuentes (yellow card) 73'	Stadium: CenturyLink Field; Attendance: 11,140

=== Other training games ===
March 10, 2012 Reserves	Seattle Sounders FC	2–0	Oregon State Beavers	Tukwila, Washington
10:30 PST, Training Game	Ochoa; Sivebæk	Report		Stadium: Starfire Sports Complex

April 1, 2012 Reserves	Seattle Sounders FC	4–0	Gonzaga Bulldogs	Tukwila, Washington
Training Game	Caskey; Johnson; Cato; Steres	Report		Stadium: Starfire Sports Complex

April 21, 2012	Seattle Sounders FC	1–0	Washington Huskies	Tukwila, Washington
12:30 PST, 60' Training Game	Montero 50'	Report		Stadium: Starfire Sports Complex

=== Overall ===
Competition	Started round	Final position / round	First match	Last match
Major League Soccer	—	Conference Championships Finalist	March 17, 2012	November 18, 2012
2011–12 CONCACAF Champions League	Quarterfinals	Quarterfinals	March 7, 2012	March 14, 2012
2012–13 CONCACAF Champions League	Group stage	Qualified for the quarterfinals	August 2, 2012	2013
U.S. Open Cup	Third round	Finalist	May 29, 2012	August 8, 2012

Updated to match played November 18, 2012
Source: Competitions

=== CONCACAF Champions League ===
==== 2011–12 edition ====
March 7, 2012 Quarterfinals: first leg	Seattle Sounders FC (United States)	2–1	(Mexico) Santos Laguna	Seattle
19:00 PDT	Estrada 12', (yellow card) 89'; Hurtado (yellow card) 33'; González (yellow card) 58'; Evans 63'	Report	Rodríguez (yellow card) 28'; Mares (yellow card) 29'; Gomez 61'; Sánchez (yellow card) 65'; Hoyos (yellow card) 80'	Stadium: CenturyLink Field; Attendance: 23,433; Referee: Wálter Quesada (Costa Rica)

March 14, 2012 Quarterfinals: second leg	Santos Laguna (Mexico)	6–1 (7–3 agg.)	(United States) Seattle Sounders FC	Torreón, Mexico
17:00 PDT	Suárez 8', 76'; Peralta 10'; Baloy (yellow card) 45'; Gomez 46', 68'; Ochoa 81'; Rodríguez (yellow card) 88'	Report	González (yellow card) 14'; Montero (yellow card) 30'; Fernández 37'	Stadium: Estadio Corona; Attendance: 14,278; Referee: Joel Aguilar (El Salvador)

==== 2012–13 edition ====
Group 4

Team	Pld	W	D	L	GF	GA	GD	Pts
(United States) Seattle Sounders FC	4	4	0	0	12	5	+7	12
(Honduras) Marathón	4	1	1	2	5	7	−2	4
(Trinidad and Tobago) Caledonia AIA	4	0	1	3	3	8	−5	1

	CAL	MAR	SEA
Caledonia AIA	–	0–0	1–3
Marathón	2–1	–	2–3
Seattle Sounders FC	3–1	3–1	–

Match results

Win Tie Loss

August 2, 2012 Group stage: match 1	Seattle Sounders FC (United States)	3–1	(Trinidad and Tobago) Caledonia AIA	Seattle
19:00 PDT	Ochoa 19'; Montero 30', (yellow card) 56'; Rose 43'	Report	Edwards (yellow card) 39'; Joseph 50' (pen.)	Stadium: CenturyLink Field; Attendance: 7,767; Referee: Stanley Lancaster (Guyana)

August 30, 2012 Group stage: match 2	Caledonia AIA (Trinidad and Tobago)	1–3	(United States) Seattle Sounders FC	Couva, Trinidad and Tobago
17:00 PDT	Moore (yellow card) 17'; Theobald (yellow card) 28'; Joseph 66' (pen.); Gay (yellow card) 71'; Abu Bakr (yellow card) 87'	Report	Caskey 45'; Ochoa 60'; Montero 69'	Stadium: Ato Boldon Stadium; Attendance: 556; Referee: Javier Santos (Puerto Rico)

September 19, 2012 Group stage: match 3	Marathón (Honduras)	2–3	(United States) Seattle Sounders FC	San Pedro Sula, Honduras
19:00 PDT	Berríos 35' (pen.), 68' (pen.); Castro (yellow card) 42'; Mayorquín (yellow card) 84'	Report	Ochoa 11'; Carrasco (yellow card) 26'; Gspurning (yellow card) 34'; Johnson 62'; Ianni (yellow card) 67'; Scott (yellow card) 72'; Evans 78'	Stadium: Estadio Yankel Rosenthal; Attendance: 968; Referee: Marlon Mejía (El Salvador)

October 24, 2012 Group stage: match 4	Seattle Sounders FC (United States)	3–1	(Honduras) Marathón	Seattle
19:00 PDT	Ochoa 23'; Zakuani 27'; Estrada 76'	Report	Brown 37', (yellow card) 83'; Arzú (yellow card) 40'	Stadium: CenturyLink Field; Attendance: 7,874; Referee: Ricardo Arellano (Mexico)

=== MLS regular season ===
==== Table ====
Western Conference

Pos	Team	Pld	W	L	T	GF	GA	GD	Pts	Qualification
1	San Jose Earthquakes	34	19	6	9	72	43	+29	66	Qualification for the conference semifinals
2	Real Salt Lake	34	17	11	6	46	35	+11	57	Qualification for the conference semifinals
3	Seattle Sounders FC	34	15	8	11	51	33	+18	56	Qualification for the conference semifinals
4	LA Galaxy	34	16	12	6	59	47	+12	54	Qualification for the knockout round
5	Vancouver Whitecaps FC	34	11	13	10	35	41	−6	43	Qualification for the knockout round
6	FC Dallas	34	9	13	12	42	47	−5	39	
7	Colorado Rapids	34	11	19	4	44	50	−6	37	
8	Portland Timbers	34	8	16	10	34	56	−22	34	
9	Chivas USA	34	7	18	9	24	58	−34	30	

Source: MLS

Overall

Pos	Team	Pld	W	L	T	GF	GA	GD	Pts	
1	San Jose Earthquakes (S)	34	19	6	9	72	43	+29	66	Qualification for the CONCACAF Champions League
2	Sporting Kansas City (U)	34	18	7	9	42	27	+15	63	Qualification for the CONCACAF Champions League
3	D.C. United	34	17	10	7	53	43	+10	58	
4	New York Red Bulls	34	16	9	9	57	46	+11	57	
5	Real Salt Lake	34	17	11	6	46	35	+11	57	
6	Chicago Fire	34	17	11	6	46	41	+5	57	
7	Seattle Sounders FC	34	15	8	11	51	33	+18	56	
8	LA Galaxy (C)	34	16	12	6	59	47	+12	54	Qualification for the CONCACAF Champions League
9	Houston Dynamo	34	14	9	11	48	41	+7	53	Qualification for the CONCACAF Champions League
10	Columbus Crew	34	15	12	7	44	44	0	52	
11	Vancouver Whitecaps FC	34	11	13	10	35	41	−6	43	
12	Montreal Impact	34	12	16	6	45	51	−6	42	Qualification for the CONCACAF Champions League
13	FC Dallas	34	9	13	12	42	47	−5	39	
14	Colorado Rapids	34	11	19	4	44	50	−6	37	
15	Philadelphia Union	34	10	18	6	37	45	−8	36	
16	New England Revolution	34	9	17	8	39	44	−5	35	
17	Portland Timbers	34	8	16	10	34	56	−22	34	
18	Chivas USA	34	7	18	9	24	58	−34	30	
19	Toronto FC (V)	34	5	21	8	36	62	−26	23	

Source: MLS
Rules for classification: 1) points; 2) head-to-head record; 3) goal difference; 4) number of goals scored
(C) MLS Cup champions; (S) Supporters' Shield winners; (U) U.S. Open Cup winners; (V) Canadian Championship winners

==== Results summary ====
Overall								Home						Away					
Pld	Pts	W	L	T	GF	GA	GD	W	L	T	GF	GA	GD	W	L	T	GF	GA	GD
34	56	15	8	11	51	33	+18	11	4	2	27	11	+16	4	4	9	24	22	+2

Last updated: October 28, 2012
Source: 2012 Major League Soccer season
Pld = Matches played; Pts = Points; W = Matches won; T = Matches tied; L = Matches lost; GF = Goals for; GA = Goals against; GD = Goal difference

==== Results by round ====
Round	1	2	3	4	5	6	7	8	9	10	11	12	13	14	15	16	17	18	19	20	21	22	23	24	25	26	27	28	29	30	31	32	33	34
Stadium	H	H	H	A	H	A	H	H	A	H	A	H	A	A	H	A	A	A	H	A	A	H	A	H	A	A	H	A	H	A	H	H	H	A
Result	W	W	L	T	W	W	W	W	W	L	T	L	T	L	T	L	T	T	W	T	W	W	L	W	W	T	W	T	L	T	W	T	W	L

Updated to match(es) played on October 28, 2012. Source: Regular season matches
A = Away; H = Home; W = Win; L = Loss; T = Tie

==== Match results ====
Win Tie Loss

March 17, 2012 Match 1	Seattle Sounders FC	3–1	Toronto FC	Seattle
19:00 PDT	Estrada 17', 51', 63'; Alonso (yellow card) 25'	Report	Johnson 61'; Maund (yellow card) 90+2'	Stadium: CenturyLink Field; Attendance: 39,232; Referee: Ricardo Salazar

March 23, 2012 Match 2	Seattle Sounders FC	2–0	Houston Dynamo	Seattle
19:00 PDT	Estrada 23'; Evans 27' (pen.); Fernández (yellow card) 83'	Report	Moffat (yellow card) 35'; Davis (yellow card) 78'	Stadium: CenturyLink Field; Attendance: 38,304; Referee: Baldomero Toledo

March 31, 2012 Match 3	Seattle Sounders FC	0–1	San Jose Earthquakes	Seattle
19:00 PDT	Alonso (yellow card) 6'; Sivebæk (yellow card) 45+2'; Scott (yellow card) 79'	Report	Wondolowski 24' (pen.); Baca (yellow card) 63'; Lenhart (yellow card) 64'; Gordon (yellow card) 81'	Stadium: CenturyLink Field; Attendance: 38,458; Referee: Mark Kadlecik

April 7, 2012 Match 4	D.C. United	0–0	Seattle Sounders FC	Washington, D.C.
16:30 PDT	Maicon Santos (yellow card) 12'; Jaković (yellow card) 30'	Report		Stadium: RFK Stadium; Attendance: 15,651; Referee: Edvin Jurisevic

April 14, 2012 Match 5	Seattle Sounders FC	1–0	Colorado Rapids	Seattle
13:00 PDT	Johnson (yellow card) 47'; Scott (yellow card) 49', (goal) 63'; Montero (yellow card) 87'	Report	Mullan (yellow card) 87'	Stadium: CenturyLink Field; Attendance: 38,360; Referee: Baldomero Toledo

April 28, 2012 Match 6	Chicago Fire	1–2	Seattle Sounders FC	Bridgeview, Illinois
17:30 PDT	Pappa 89', (yellow card) 90+1'	Report	Friedrich 39' (o.g.); Estrada (yellow card) 60'; Johnson 67', (yellow card) 90+2'; Montero (yellow card) 90+1'	Stadium: Toyota Park; Attendance: 14,166; Referee: Michael Kennedy

May 2, 2012 Match 7	Seattle Sounders FC	2–0	Los Angeles Galaxy	Seattle
19:00 PDT	Johnson 40'; Montero 48'	Report	Marcelo Sarvas (yellow card) 34'	Stadium: CenturyLink Field; Attendance: 39,002; Referee: Hilario Grajeda

May 5, 2012 Match 8	Seattle Sounders FC	1–0	Philadelphia Union	Seattle
13:30 PDT	Rose (yellow card) 18'; Rosales 63'	Report	Gómez (yellow card) 78'	Stadium: CenturyLink Field; Attendance: 38,399; Referee: Ricardo Salazar

May 9, 2012 Match 9	FC Dallas	0–2	Seattle Sounders FC	Frisco, Texas
17:30 PDT	John (yellow card) 57'	Report	Burch (yellow card) 30'; Parke (yellow card) 42'; Montero 68', 71', (yellow card) 82'; Scott (yellow card) 75'	Stadium: FC Dallas Stadium; Attendance: 10,092; Referee: Fotis Bazakos

May 12, 2012 Match 10	Seattle Sounders FC	0–1	Real Salt Lake	Seattle
19:00 PDT	Johnson (yellow card) 54'	Report	Espíndola 51'; Saborío (yellow card) 70'	Stadium: CenturyLink Field; Attendance: 39,312; Referee: Mark Geiger

May 19, 2012 Match 11 Cascadia Cup	Vancouver Whitecaps FC	2–2	Seattle Sounders FC	Vancouver
14:00 PDT	Rochat 12'; Camilo 82', (yellow card) 90+3'; Koffie (yellow card) 83'	Report	Johnson 47'; Montero 90'	Stadium: BC Place; Attendance: 21,000; Referee: Kevin Stott

May 23, 2012 Match 12	Seattle Sounders FC	0–2	Columbus Crew	Seattle
19:00 PDT	Burch (yellow card) 85'; Alonso (yellow card) 88'	Report	Meram 15'; Duka (yellow card) 47'; Mendes (yellow card) 71'; Rentería 76'	Stadium: CenturyLink Field; Attendance: 38,311; Referee: Geoff Gamble

May 26, 2012 Match 13	Chivas USA	1–1	Seattle Sounders FC	Carson, California
19:30 PDT	Agudelo 58'	Report	Rose (yellow card) 20'; Estrada 61'	Stadium: Home Depot Center; Attendance: 12,280; Referee: Chris Penso

June 16, 2012 Match 14	Montreal Impact	4–1	Seattle Sounders FC	Montreal
16:30 PDT	Felipe 18'; Mapp 51'; Wenger 58'; Thomas (yellow card) 79'; Rivas (yellow card) 85'; Neagle 87'	Report	Parke (yellow card) 22'; Hurtado (red card) 56'; Johnson 61', (yellow card) 70'; Montero (yellow card) 76'	Stadium: Saputo Stadium; Attendance: 17,112; Referee: Mark Geiger

June 20, 2012 Match 15	Seattle Sounders FC	1–1	Sporting Kansas City	Seattle
19:00 PDT	Ianni 15'; Scott (yellow card) 89'; Fernández (red card) 90+2'	Report	Peterson 8'; Collin (yellow card) 16'; Olum (yellow card) 48'; Nielsen (yellow card) 59'	Stadium: CenturyLink Field; Attendance: 46,932; Referee: Jair Marrufo

June 24, 2012 Match 16 Cascadia Cup	Portland Timbers	2–1	Seattle Sounders FC	Portland, Oregon
14:00 PDT	Boyd 16'; Horst 25'; Chará (yellow card) 44'; Alhassan (yellow card) 54'; Smith (yellow card) 73'; Jewsbury (yellow card) 90'; Palmer (red card) 90+2'	Report	Evans (yellow card) 18'; Alonso (yellow card) 48'; Johnson 59'; Montero (red card) 90+1'	Stadium: JELD-WEN Field; Attendance: 20,438; Referee: Ricardo Salazar

June 30, 2012 Match 17	New England Revolution	2–2	Seattle Sounders FC	Foxborough, Massachusetts
16:30 PDT	Sène 12'; Fagundez 90+4'	Report	Rose (yellow card) 18'; Johnson 23', 36'; Alonso (yellow card) 50'; González (yellow card) 90'	Stadium: Gillette Stadium; Attendance: 15,264; Referee: Edvin Jurisevic

July 4, 2012 Match 18	Real Salt Lake	0–0	Seattle Sounders FC	Sandy, Utah
19:00 PDT	Saborío (yellow card) 41'; Wingert (yellow card) 56'; Espíndola (yellow card) 86'	Report	Hurtado (yellow card) 41'; González (yellow card) 45+1'	Stadium: Rio Tinto Stadium; Attendance: 20,363; Referee: Hilario Grajeda

July 7, 2012 Match 19	Seattle Sounders FC	2–1	Colorado Rapids	Seattle
20:00 PDT	Fernández 52'; Johnson 64', (yellow card) 64'	Report	Rivero (yellow card) 41'; Cummings 79'	Stadium: CenturyLink Field; Attendance: 39,060; Referee: Kevin Stott

July 15, 2012 Match 20	New York Red Bulls	2–2	Seattle Sounders FC	Harrison, New Jersey
13:00 PDT	Le Toux 24'; Lade (yellow card) 53'; Lindpere 61'; Henry (yellow card) 74'	Report	Fernández 16'; Burch (yellow card) 44'; Rose (yellow card) 66'; Montero 67'	Stadium: Red Bull Arena (New Jersey); Attendance: 19,414; Referee: Jorge Gonzalez

July 28, 2012 Match 21	Colorado Rapids	1–2	Seattle Sounders FC	Commerce City, Colorado
18:00 PDT	Moor 3'	Report	Johnson 2'; Alonso 65'	Stadium: Dick's Sporting Goods Park; Attendance: 13,816; Referee: Paul Ward

August 5, 2012 Match 22	Seattle Sounders FC	4–0	Los Angeles Galaxy	Seattle
18:00 PDT	Johnson 6'; Montero 52'; Evans (yellow card) 60'; Caskey 61'; Rose 88'	Report	DeLaGarza (yellow card) 24'	Stadium: CenturyLink Field; Attendance: 60,908; Referee: Chris Penso

August 11, 2012 Match 23 Heritage Cup	San Jose Earthquakes	2–1	Seattle Sounders FC	Santa Clara, California
19:30 PDT	Bernárdez (yellow card) 15'; Morrow (yellow card) 45+2'; Dawkins 71'; Lenhart 90+3'	Report	Johansson (yellow card) 82'; Montero 90+1'	Stadium: Buck Shaw Stadium; Attendance: 10,744; Referee: Baldomero Toledo

August 18, 2012 Match 24 Cascadia Cup	Seattle Sounders FC	2–0	Vancouver Whitecaps FC	Seattle
13:00 PDT	Hurtado (yellow card) 59'; Montero 64'; Johnson 87'	Report	Koffie (yellow card) 90+1'	Stadium: CenturyLink Field; Attendance: 55,718; Referee: Silviu Petrescu

August 25, 2012 Match 25	Chivas USA	2–6	Seattle Sounders FC	Carson, California
19:30 PDT	Agudelo 38' (pen.); Bolaños 64', (yellow card) 90+1'	Report	Evans 10'; Montero 27', 34', 67'; Alonso (yellow card) 54'; Ochoa 80'; Jazić 90+1' (o.g.)	Stadium: The Home Depot Center; Attendance: 11,973; Referee: Jose Carlos Rivero

September 2, 2012 Match 26	FC Dallas	1–1	Seattle Sounders FC	Frisco, Texas
16:00 PDT	Jackson 32', (yellow card) 56'; John (yellow card) 42'	Report	Rosales 21'; Montero (yellow card) 30'; González (yellow card) 72'; Carrasco (yellow card) 86'	Stadium: FC Dallas Stadium; Attendance: 12,811; Referee: Sorin Stoica

September 8, 2012 Match 27	Seattle Sounders FC	2–1	Chivas USA	Seattle
13:00 PDT	Johnson 29', 89'	Report	LaBrocca 8'; Joseph (yellow card) 66'; Townsend (yellow card) 76'	Stadium: CenturyLink Field; Attendance: 38,934; Referee: Kevin Stott

September 15, 2012 Match 28 Cascadia Cup	Portland Timbers	1–1	Seattle Sounders FC	Portland, Oregon
12:30 PDT	Wallace 78'	Report	Johnson (yellow card) 26'; Montero 57'; Martínez (yellow card) 79'	Stadium: JELD-WEN Field; Attendance: 20,448; Referee: Ricardo Salazar

September 22, 2012 Match 29 Heritage Cup	Seattle Sounders FC	1–2	San Jose Earthquakes	Seattle
19:30 PDT	Zakuani 14'; Tiffert (yellow card) 78'; Alonso (yellow card) 90'	Report	Dawkins 2'; Wondolowski 30'; Bernárdez (yellow card) 53'	Stadium: CenturyLink Field; Attendance: 38,948

September 29, 2012 Match 30 Cascadia Cup	Vancouver Whitecaps FC	0–0	Seattle Sounders FC	Vancouver
18:00 PDT	Harvey (yellow card) 49'	Report	Parke (yellow card) 55'	Stadium: BC Place; Attendance: 21,000; Referee: Silviu Petrescu

October 7, 2012 Match 31 Cascadia Cup	Seattle Sounders FC	3–0	Portland Timbers	Seattle
18:00 PDT	Danso 25' (o.g.); Johnson 28'; Montero 62'; Tiffert (yellow card) 69'	Report	Chará (yellow card) 73'	Stadium: CenturyLink Field; Attendance: 66,452; Referee: Jair Marrufo

October 17, 2012 Match 32	Seattle Sounders FC	0–0	Real Salt Lake	Seattle
19:00 PDT	Scott (yellow card) 10' (yellow-red card) 30'; Tiffert (yellow card) 67'	Report	Beltran (yellow card) 45+1'; Schuler (yellow card) 51'	Stadium: CenturyLink Field; Attendance: 38,356; Referee: Ricardo Salazar

October 21, 2012 Match 33	Seattle Sounders FC	3–1	FC Dallas	Seattle
18:00 PDT	Evans 32' (pen.), 60'; Tiffert (yellow card) 45'; Rosales (yellow card) 72', (goal) 79'	Report	Pérez 40'	Stadium: CenturyLink Field; Attendance: 38,755; Referee: Baldomero Toledo

October 28, 2012 Match 34	Los Angeles Galaxy	1–0	Seattle Sounders FC	Carson, California
18:00 PDT	Saunders (yellow card) 4'; Magee 83'; Sarvas (yellow card) 90'	Report	Alonso (yellow card) 90'	Stadium: The Home Depot Center; Attendance: 27,000; Referee: Kevin Stott

=== MLS Cup Playoffs ===
November 2 Conference semifinals: leg 1	Seattle Sounders FC	0–0	Real Salt Lake	Seattle
19:00 PDT	Parke (yellow card) 45+1'; Evans (yellow card) 54'	Report	Beckerman (yellow card) 53'; Morales (yellow card) 56'	Stadium: CenturyLink Field; Attendance: 34,941; Referee: Hilario Grajeda

November 8 Conference semifinals: leg 2	Real Salt Lake	0–1 (0–1 agg.)	Seattle Sounders FC	Sandy, Utah
19:00 PDT		Report	Alonso (yellow card) 51'; Martínez 81'	Stadium: Rio Tinto Stadium; Attendance: 19,657; Referee: Chris Penso

November 11 Conference championships: leg 1	Los Angeles Galaxy	3–0	Seattle Sounders FC	Carson, California
18:00 PDT	Keane 45+1', 67'; Magee 64'	Report	Hurtado (yellow card) 14'	Stadium: The Home Depot Center; Attendance: 27,000; Referee: Jair Marrufo

November 18 Conference championships: leg 2	Seattle Sounders FC	2–1 (2–4 agg.)	Los Angeles Galaxy	Seattle
18:00 PDT	Johnson 12', (yellow card) 68'; Scott 57'; Alonso (yellow card) 75' (yellow-red card) 90+5'	Report	Keane 68' (pen.)	Stadium: CenturyLink Field; Attendance: 44,575; Referee: Mark Geiger

=== U.S. Open Cup ===
May 30, 2012 Third round	Seattle Sounders FC	5–1	Atlanta Silverbacks	Tukwila, Washington
19:00 PDT	Rose 45'; Alonso 47'; Caskey 54'; Burch (yellow card) 59'; Ochoa 62', 66'	Report	Navia 54', (yellow card) 59'; Davis (yellow card) 88'	Stadium: Starfire Sports Complex; Attendance: 3,703; Referee: Josh Wilkens

June 5, 2012 Fourth round	Seattle Sounders FC	5–0	Cal FC	Tukwila, Washington
19:00 PDT	Alonso (yellow card) 19', (goal) 50' (pen.), 69'; Ochoa (yellow card) 45'; Montero 58', 68'; Rose 66'	Report	Richard Menjivar (yellow card) 74'	Stadium: Starfire Sports Complex; Attendance: 3,894

June 26, 2012 Quarterfinal	San Jose Earthquakes	0–1	Seattle Sounders FC	San Francisco
19:30 PDT	Gordon (yellow card) 49', (red card) 90+3'; Morrow (yellow card) 75'	Report	Cato 19'; Scott (yellow card) 51'; Rose (yellow card) 82'; Burch (yellow card) 90+4'	Stadium: Kezar Stadium; Attendance: 7,219; Referee: Yader Reyes

July 11, 2012 Semifinal	Seattle Sounders FC	4–1	Chivas USA	Tukwila, Washington
19:00 PDT	Johnson 31'; Alonso (yellow card) 42', (goal) 48' (pen.); Evans 83'; Ochoa 88'	Report	Minda (yellow card) 43'; Romero 74'; Califf (yellow card) 77'	Stadium: Starfire Sports Complex; Attendance: 4,500; Referee: Chris Penso

August 8, 2012 Final	Sporting Kansas City	1–1 (a.e.t.) (3–2 p)	Seattle Sounders FC	Kansas City, Kansas
18:00 PDT	Kamara 84' (pen.)	Report	Alonso (yellow card) 4'; Rosales (yellow card) 57'; Ianni (yellow card) 73' (yellow-red card) 118'; Scott 86', (yellow card) 93'	Stadium: Livestrong Sporting Park; Attendance: 18,863; Referee: Ricardo Salazar
	Penalties
	Kamara (penalty scored); Espinoza (penalty missed); Besler (penalty scored); Zusi (penalty missed); Nagamura (penalty scored)		(penalty scored) Evans; (penalty scored) Burch; (penalty missed) Alonso; (penalty missed) Tiffert; (penalty missed) Johnson

=== World Football Challenge ===
July 18, 2012	Seattle Sounders FC	2–4	Chelsea	Seattle
18:30 PDT	Montero 14', 32'	Report	Lukaku 3', 44'; Hazard 11'; Marin 40'	Stadium: CenturyLink Field; Attendance: 53,309; Referee: Ricardo Salazar

=== Cascadia Cup ===
The Cascadia Cup is a trophy that was created in 2004 by supporters of the Portland Timbers, Seattle Sounders FC and Vancouver Whitecaps FC. It is awarded to the club with the best record in league games versus the other participants.

Pos	Team	GP	W	L	D	GF	GA	GD	Pts
1	Portland Timbers	6	3	1	2	7	7	0	11
2	Seattle Sounders FC	6	2	1	3	9	5	+4	9
3	Vancouver Whitecaps FC	6	0	3	3	4	8	-4	3

== Squad statistics ==
=== Appearances and goals ===
No.	Pos	Nat	Player	Total		Major League Soccer		Playoffs		Champions League		U.S. Open Cup	
No.	Pos	Nat	Player	Apps	Goals	Apps	Goals	Apps	Goals	Apps	Goals	Apps	Goals
1	GK	(Austria) AUT	Michael Gspurning	34	-30	25+0	-15	4+0	-4	4+0	-10	1+0	-1
3	MF	(United States) USA	Brad Evans	45	7	33+0	4	4+0	0	4+1	2	1+2	1
4	DF	(United States) USA	Patrick Ianni	21	1	15+1	1	0+0	0	2+0	0	3+0	0
5	DF	(Sweden) SWE	Adam Johansson	32	0	25+0	0	4+0	0	2+1	0	0+0	0
6	MF	(Cuba) CUB	Osvaldo Alonso	47	5	34+0	1	4+0	0	4+1	0	4+0	4
7	FW	(United States) USA	Eddie Johnson	41	17	26+5	14	2+1	1	1+2	1	3+1	1
8	DF	(United States) USA	Marc Burch	42	0	21+10	0	2+0	0	3+2	0	2+2	0
10	MF	(Argentina) ARG	Mauro Rosales	34	3	26+3	3	1+1	0	2+0	0	1+0	0
11	MF	(Democratic Republic of the Congo) COD	Steve Zakuani	15	2	5+6	1	1+2	0	1+0	1	0+0	0
12	DF	(Costa Rica) CRC	Leonardo González	26	0	15+4	0	0+0	0	2+2	0	3+0	0
13	MF	(Germany) GER	Christian Tiffert	22	0	15+1	0	4+0	0	0+1	0	0+1	0
14	MF	(Ghana) GHA	Michael Tetteh	0	0	0+0	0	0+0	0	0+0	0	0+0	0
15	MF	(Honduras) HON	Mario Martínez (on loan from Real España)	14	2	2+5	1	2+2	1	3+0	0	0+0	0
16	MF	(United States) USA	David Estrada	28	7	12+8	5	0+3	0	3+0	2	0+2	0
17	FW	(Colombia) COL	Fredy Montero	49	17	32+5	13	4+0	0	4+1	2	3+0	2
19	FW	(Canada) CAN	Babayele Sodade	0	0	0+0	0	0+0	0	0+0	0	0+0	0
20	DF	(United States) USA	Zach Scott	34	4	18+5	2	2+1	1	3+0	0	5+0	1
21	FW	(Trinidad and Tobago) TTO	Cordell Cato	15	1	0+8	0	0+0	0	1+2	0	4+0	1
22	MF	(United States) USA	Mike Seamon	2	0	0+1	0	0+0	0	1+0	0	0+0	0
23	MF	(United States) USA	Servando Carrasco	15	0	2+7	0	0+0	0	2+1	0	1+2	0
24	GK	(United States) USA	Marcus Hahnemann	1	-1	0+0	0	0+0	0	1+0	-1	0+0	0
25	MF	(England) ENG	Andy Rose	35	4	11+14	1	0+2	0	3+0	1	5+0	2
26	FW	(United States) USA	Sammy Ochoa	19	8	4+6	1	1+0	0	4+0	4	3+1	3
27	MF	(United States) USA	Alex Caskey	30	3	13+8	1	1+0	0	3+1	1	4+0	1
29	GK	(United States) USA	Josh Ford	0	0	0+0	0	0+0	0	0+0	0	0+0	0
30	DF	(United States) USA	Andrew Duran	0	0	0+0	0	0+0	0	0+0	0	0+0	0
31	DF	(United States) USA	Jeff Parke	44	0	33+1	0	4+0	0	4+0	0	2+0	0
32	DF	(United States) USA	Daniel Steres	0	0	0+0	0	0+0	0	0+0	0	0+0	0
33	GK	(United States) USA	Andrew Weber	5	-5	3+0	-4	0+0	0	1+0	-1	1+0	0
34	DF	(Colombia) COL	Jhon Kennedy Hurtado	41	0	24+2	0	4+0	0	6+0	0	4+1	0
35	GK	(United States) USA	Bryan Meredith	15	-16	10+2	-14	0+0	0	0+0	0	3+0	-2
			Own goals for	0	3	0+0	3	0+0	0	0+0	0	0+0	0
Players who left the club during the season: (Statistics shown are the appearances made and goals scored while at Seattle Sounders)
13	FW	(Jamaica) JAM	O'Brian White (Released)	0	0	0+0	0	0+0	0	0+0	0	0+0	0
15	MF	(Uruguay) URU	Álvaro Fernández (Traded)	18	3	11+3	2	0+0	0	2+0	1	1+1	0
24	FW	(United States) USA	Roger Levesque (Retired)	8	0	2+2	0	0+0	0	0+1	0	1+2	0
28	MF	(Denmark) DEN	Christian Sivebæk (Waived)	4	0	1+2	0	0+0	0	0+1	0	0+0	0
--	MF	(The Gambia) GAM	Amadou Sanyang (Released)	0	0	0+0	0	0+0	0	0+0	0	0+0	0

Updated to match played November 18, 2012
Source: Competitive matches

=== Top scorers ===
Includes all competitive matches. The list is sorted by shirt number when total goals are equal.

Ran	No.	Pos	Nat	Name	Major League Soccer	Playoffs	Champions League	U.S. Open Cup	Total
1	7	FW	(United States)	Eddie Johnson	14	1	1	1	17
1	17	FW	(Colombia)	Fredy Montero	13	0	2	2	17
3	26	FW	(United States)	Sammy Ochoa	1	0	4	3	8
4	3	MF	(United States)	Brad Evans	4	0	2	1	7
4	16	MF	(United States)	David Estrada	5	0	2	0	7
6	6	MF	(Cuba)	Osvaldo Alonso	1	0	0	4	5
7	25	MF	(England)	Andy Rose	1	0	1	2	4
8	10	MF	(Argentina)	Mauro Rosales	3	0	0	0	3
8	15	MF	(Uruguay)	Álvaro Fernández	2	0	1	0	3
8	20	DF	(United States)	Zach Scott	1	1	0	1	3
8	27	MF	(United States)	Alex Caskey	1	0	1	1	3
8					3	0	0	0	3
13	11	MF	(Democratic Republic of the Congo)	Steve Zakuani	1	0	1	0	2
14	4	DF	(United States)	Patrick Ianni	1	0	0	0	1
14	15	MF	(Honduras)	Mario Martínez	0	1	0	0	1
14	21	FW	(Trinidad and Tobago)	Cordell Cato	0	0	0	1	1
				TOTALS	51	3	15	16	85

Last updated: November 18, 2012
Source: Competitive matches

Italic: denotes no longer with club.

=== Clean sheets ===
Includes all competitive matches. The list is sorted by shirt number when total clean sheets are equal.

Ran	No.	Pos	Nat	Name	Major League Soccer	Playoffs	Champions League	U.S. Open Cup	Total
1	1	GK	(Austria)	Michael Gspurning	9	2	0	0	11
2	35	GK	(United States)	Bryan Meredith	3	0	0	1	4
3	33	GK	(United States)	Andrew Weber	0	0	0	1	1
4	24	GK	(United States)	Marcus Hahnemann	0	0	0	0	0
4	29	GK	(United States)	Josh Ford	0	0	0	0	0
				TOTALS	12	2	0	2	16

Last updated: November 9, 2012
Source: Competitive matches

Italic: denotes no longer with club.

=== Disciplinary record ===
Includes all competitive matches. The list is sorted by shirt number when total cards are equal.

R	No.	Pos	Nat	Name	Major League Soccer			Playoffs			Champions League			U.S. Open Cup			Total		
R	No.	Pos	Nat	Name	Yellow card	(yellow card) (yellow-red card)	Red card	Yellow card	(yellow card) (yellow-red card)	Red card	Yellow card	(yellow card) (yellow-red card)	Red card	Yellow card	(yellow card) (yellow-red card)	Red card	Yellow card	(yellow card) (yellow-red card)	Red card
1	6	MF	(Cuba)	Osvaldo Alonso	8	0	0	3	1	0	0	0	0	3	0	0	14	1	0
2	20	DF	(United States)	Zach Scott	6	1	0	0	0	0	1	0	0	1	0	0	8	1	0
3	17	FW	(Colombia)	Fredy Montero	5	0	1	0	0	0	2	0	0	0	0	0	7	0	1
4	7	FW	(United States)	Eddie Johnson	6	0	0	1	0	0	0	0	0	0	0	0	7	0	0
5	8	DF	(United States)	Marc Burch	3	0	0	0	0	0	0	0	0	2	0	0	5	0	0
5	12	DF	(Costa Rica)	Leonardo González	3	0	0	0	0	0	2	0	0	0	0	0	5	0	0
5	25	MF	(England)	Andy Rose	4	0	0	0	0	0	0	0	0	1	0	0	5	0	0
5	34	DF	(Colombia)	Jhon Kennedy Hurtado	2	0	1	1	0	0	1	0	0	0	0	0	4	0	1
9	4	DF	(United States)	Patrick Ianni	0	0	0	0	0	0	1	0	0	2	1	0	3	1	0
9	13	MF	(Germany)	Christian Tiffert	4	0	0	0	0	0	0	0	0	0	0	0	4	0	0
9	31	DF	(United States)	Jeff Parke	3	0	0	1	0	0	0	0	0	0	0	0	4	0	0
12	3	MF	(United States)	Brad Evans	2	0	0	1	0	0	0	0	0	0	0	0	3	0	0
13	10	MF	(Argentina)	Mauro Rosales	1	0	0	0	0	0	0	0	0	1	0	0	2	0	0
13	15	MF	(Uruguay)	Álvaro Fernández	1	0	1	0	0	0	0	0	0	0	0	0	1	0	1
13	16	MF	(United States)	David Estrada	1	0	0	0	0	0	1	0	0	0	0	0	2	0	0
13	23	MF	(United States)	Servando Carrasco	1	0	0	0	0	0	1	0	0	0	0	0	2	0	0
17	1	GK	(Austria)	Michael Gspurning	0	0	0	0	0	0	1	0	0	0	0	0	1	0	0
17	5	DF	(Sweden)	Adam Johansson	1	0	0	0	0	0	0	0	0	0	0	0	1	0	0
17	15	MF	(Honduras)	Mario Martínez	1	0	0	0	0	0	0	0	0	0	0	0	1	0	0
17	26	FW	(United States)	Sammy Ochoa	0	0	0	0	0	0	0	0	0	1	0	0	1	0	0
17	28	MF	(Denmark)	Christian Sivebæk	1	0	0	0	0	0	0	0	0	0	0	0	1	0	0
				TOTALS	53	1	3	7	1	0	10	0	0	11	1	0	81	3	3

Last updated: November 19, 2012
Source: Competitive matches

Italic: denotes no longer with club.

=== Captains ===
Accounts for all competitions. Last updated on November 18, 2012.

No.	Pos.	Name	Games
10	MF	(Argentina) Mauro Rosales	29
6	MF	(Cuba) Osvaldo Alonso	9
20	DF	(United States) Zach Scott	6
17	FW	(Colombia) Fredy Montero	5

=== Team statistics ===
	Total	Home	Away
Games played	49	25	24
Games won	26	18	8
Games drawn	12	3	9
Games lost	11	4	7
Biggest win	5–0 v Cal FC	5–0 v Cal FC	6–2 v Chivas USA
Biggest loss	1–6 v Santos Laguna	0–2 v Columbus Crew	1–6 v Santos Laguna
Biggest win (League)	4–0 v Los Angeles Galaxy; 6–2 v Chivas USA	4–0 v Los Angeles Galaxy	6–2 v Chivas USA
Biggest win (Playoffs)	1–0 v Real Salt Lake; 2–1 v Los Angeles Galaxy	2–1 v Los Angeles Galaxy	1–0 v Real Salt Lake
Biggest win (North America)	3–1 v Caledonia AIA; 3–1 v Marathón	3–1 v Caledonia AIA; 3–1 v Marathón	3–1 v Caledonia AIA
Biggest win (Cup)	5–0 v Cal FC	5–0 v Cal FC	1–0 v San Jose Earthquakes
Biggest loss (League)	1–4 v Montreal Impact	0–2 v Columbus Crew	1–4 v Montreal Impact
Biggest loss (Playoffs)	0–3 v Los Angeles Galaxy	n/a	0–3 v Los Angeles Galaxy
Biggest loss (North America)	1–6 v Santos Laguna	n/a	1–6 v Santos Laguna
Biggest loss (Cup)	1(2)–1(3) v Sporting Kansas City	n/a	1(2)–1(3) v Sporting Kansas City
Clean sheets	16	10	6
Goals scored	85	51	34
Goals conceded	52	17	35
Goal difference	+33	+34	−1
Average GF per game	1.73	2.04	1.42
Average GA per game	1.06	0.68	1.46
Yellow cards	81	37	44
Red cards	6	3	3
Most appearances	Montero (45)	Alonso (24)	Johnson (22); Montero (22)
Top scorer	Johnson (17); Montero (17)	Johnson (9)	Montero (10)
Worst discipline	Alonso 14 (yellow card) 1 (red card)	Alonso 8 (yellow card) 1 (red card)	Alonso 6 (yellow card); Montero 5 (yellow card) 1 (red card)
Penalties for	4/4 100%	4/4 100%	0/0
Penalties against	8/8 100%	3/3 100%	5/5 100%
Points (League)	54.9%	68.63%	41.18%
Winning rate	53.06%	72%	33.33%

Last updated: November 18, 2012
Source: Competitive matches

=== International call-ups ===
No.	P	Name	Country	Level	Caps	Goals	Opposition	Competition	Source
5	DF	Adam Johansson	Sweden	Senior	2	0	vs. Bahrain ✓ (January 18) vs. Qatar U-23 ✓ (January 23)	Friendly	
31	DF	Jeff Parke	United States	Senior	1	0	vs. Venezuela ✗ (January 21) vs. Panama ✓ (January 25)	Friendly	
3	MF	Brad Evans	United States	Senior	2	0	vs. Venezuela ✓ (January 21) vs. Panama ✓ (January 25)	Friendly	
19	FW	Babayele Sodade	Canada	U-23	1	0	vs. El Salvador U-23 ✗ (March 22 – group stage) vs. United States U-23 ✓ (March 24 – group stage) vs. Cuba U-23 ✗ (March 26 – group stage) vs. Mexico U-23 ✗ (March 31 – Semi-finals)	2012 CONCACAF Olympic Qualifying	
21	FW	Cordell Cato	Trinidad and Tobago	U-23	0	0	vs. Mexico U-23 ✗ (March 23 – group stage) vs. Panama U-23 ✗ (March 25 – group stage) vs. Honduras U-23 ✗ (March 27 – group stage)	2012 CONCACAF Olympic Qualifying	
15	MF	Mario Martínez	Honduras	U-23	1	1	vs. Brazil U-23 ✓ (August 4 – Quarter-finals)	2012 Summer Olympics	
15	MF	Mario Martínez	Honduras	Senior	1	0	vs. Boca Juniors ✓ (August 15)	Friendly – Unofficial	
15	MF	Mario Martínez	Honduras	Senior	4	2	vs. Cuba ✓ (September 7 – group stage) vs. Cuba ✓ (September 11 – group stage) vs. Panama ✓ (October 12 – group stage) vs. Canada ✓ (October 16 – group stage)	2014 FIFA World Cup qualification	
5	DF	Adam Johansson	Sweden	Senior	1	0	vs. China ✓ (September 6)	Friendly	
5	DF	Adam Johansson	Sweden	Senior	1	0	vs. Kazakhstan ✗ (September 11 – group stage) vs. Faroe Islands ✗ (October 12 – group stage) vs. Germany ✗ (October 16 – group stage)	2014 FIFA World Cup qualification	
7	FW	Eddie Johnson	United States	Senior	2	2	vs. Antigua and Barbuda ✓ (October 12 – group stage) vs. Guatemala ✓ (October 16 – group stage)	2014 FIFA World Cup qualification	
15	MF	Mario Martínez	Honduras	Senior	1	0	vs. Peru ✓ (November 14)	Friendly	

== Awards ==
Sounders FC Team Award Recipients

Award	Position	Player	Link
Most Valuable Player	MF	(Cuba) Osvaldo Alonso	Sounders FC Award
Defender of the Year	DF	(United States) Jeff Parke	Sounders FC Award
Golden Boot	FW	(United States) Eddie Johnson	Sounders FC Award
Humanitarian of the Year	FW	(United States) David Estrada	Sounders FC Award

MLS Goal of the Year

Player	Opponent	Link
(United States) Patrick Ianni	Sporting Kansas City	Goal of the Year

MLS Comeback Player of the Year

Player	Link
(United States) Eddie Johnson	Comeback Player of the Year

MLS Best XI

Position	Player	Link
MF	(Cuba) Osvaldo Alonso	Best XI

U.S. Open Cup Player of the Tournament

Player	Link
(Cuba) Osvaldo Alonso	Player of the Tournament

MLS Player of the Week

Week	Player	Opponent	Link
2	(United States) David Estrada	Toronto FC	Player of the Week
22	(United States) Eddie Johnson	Los Angeles Galaxy	Player of the Week
27	(United States) Eddie Johnson	Chivas USA	Player of the Week
32	(United States) Brad Evans	FC Dallas	Player of the Week

MLS Team of the Week

Week	Player	Opponent	Link
2	(Uruguay) Álvaro Fernández (United States) David Estrada	Toronto FC	Team of the Week
3	(Cuba) Osvaldo Alonso	Houston Dynamo	Team of the Week
5	(Austria) Michael Gspurning (Cuba) Osvaldo Alonso	D.C. United	Team of the Week
6	(Cuba) Osvaldo Alonso	Colorado Rapids	Team of the Week
9	(Argentina) Mauro Rosales (Colombia) Fredy Montero	Los Angeles Galaxy; Philadelphia Union	Team of the Week
17	(United States) Eddie Johnson	New England Revolution	Team of the Week
18	(Argentina) Mauro Rosales	Colorado Rapids	Team of the Week
21	(United States) Eddie Johnson	Colorado Rapids	Team of the Week
22	(Argentina) Mauro Rosales (United States) Eddie Johnson	Los Angeles Galaxy	Team of the Week
24	(Cuba) Osvaldo Alonso	Vancouver Whitecaps FC	Team of the Week
25	(Argentina) Mauro Rosales (Colombia) Fredy Montero	Chivas USA	Team of the Week
27	(Germany) Christian Tiffert (United States) Eddie Johnson	Chivas USA	Team of the Week
28	(Colombia) Fredy Montero	Portland Timbers	Team of the Week
30	(United States) Jeff Parke	Vancouver Whitecaps FC	Team of the Week
31	(Sweden) Adam Johansson (Germany) Christian Tiffert	Portland Timbers	Team of the Week
32	(United States) Brad Evans	FC Dallas	Team of the Week

MLS Goal of the Week

Week	Player	Opponent	Link
9	(Colombia) Fredy Montero	Los Angeles Galaxy	Goal Week
11	(Colombia) Fredy Montero	Vancouver Whitecaps FC	Goal Week
16	(United States) Patrick Ianni	Sporting Kansas City	Goal Week
27	(United States) Eddie Johnson	Chivas USA	Goal Week
28	(Colombia) Fredy Montero	Portland Timbers	Goal Week

MLS All-Stars 2012

Position	Player	Link
MF	(Cuba) Osvaldo Alonso	All-Stars
FW	(United States) Eddie Johnson	All-Stars

Castrol Index Top 25 performers

Rank	Player	Score
7	(Colombia) Fredy Montero	728
12	(Austria) Michael Gspurning	695
14	(United States) Eddie Johnson	686

24 Under 24

Rank	Player	Link
24	(England) Andy Rose	24. Andy Rose

MLS W.O.R.K.S. Humanitarian of the Month

Month	Player	Link
May	(United States) Roger Levesque	Humanitarian of the Month
October	(United States) Servando Carrasco	Humanitarian of the Month

== Reserves ==
=== MLS Reserves League ===
==== League table ====
West Division

Pos	Team	GP	W	L	D	GF	GA	GD	Pts
1	LA Galaxy (C)	10	6	3	1	22	11	+11	19
2	San Jose Earthquakes	10	5	3	2	15	12	+3	17
3	Seattle Sounders FC	10	4	5	1	18	18	0	13
4	Portland Timbers	10	4	5	1	17	18	–1	13
5	Chivas USA	10	3	4	3	21	21	0	12
6	Vancouver Whitecaps FC	10	3	5	2	11	22	–11	11

Source: MLSsoccer.com

==== Match results ====
Win Tie Loss

March 26, 2012 Match 1	Vancouver Whitecaps FC	1–1	Seattle Sounders FC	Vancouver
11:00 PDT	Mitchell 90+1'	Report	Steres (yellow card) 36'; Gonzalez (yellow card) 69'; Caskey 72'	Stadium: Thunderbird Stadium

April 10, 2012 Match 2	Seattle Sounders FC	0–2	Portland Timbers	Tukwila, Washington
19:00 PDT		Report	Hurtado 4' (o.g.); Dike 22'	Stadium: Starfire Sports Complex

April 16, 2012 Match 3	Los Angeles Galaxy	1–0	Seattle Sounders FC	Carson, California
11:00 PDT	Sarvas (yellow card) 45'; Gaul (yellow card) 59'; Walker (yellow card) 88'; Garcia 90'	Report	Rose (yellow card) 59'; Burch (yellow card) 68'; Sivebæk (red card) 69'	Stadium: Home Depot Center; Referee: Juan Guzman

April 23, 2012 Match 4	Chivas USA	3–4	Seattle Sounders FC	Carson, California
11:00 PDT	Courtois 8'; Ángel 39'; Romero (yellow card) 45'; Townsend 58'; Torres (yellow card) 90+'	Report	Cato 10'; Carrasco (yellow card) 10'; Ochoa 31', 70'; Rose 62'; Levesque (yellow card) 67'	Stadium: Home Depot Center; Referee: Daniel Radford

June 1, 2012 Match 5	Seattle Sounders FC	1–2	Vancouver Whitecaps FC	Tukwila, Washington
18:00 PDT	Carrasco (yellow card) 36'; Dismuke 81'	Report	Mitchell 26', 72'	Stadium: Starfire Sports Complex; Referee: Paul Nothman

August 12, 2012 Match 6	San Jose Earthquakes	3–0	Seattle Sounders FC	San Jose, California
11:00 PDT	Ring (yellow card) 45'; Garza 57'; Güvenışık 63'; Corrales 66'	Report	Tetteh (yellow card) 65'	Stadium: Nutrilite Training Facility; Attendance: 250; Referee: Vince Cortes

August 19, 2012 Match 7	Seattle Sounders FC	3–2	Los Angeles Galaxy	Tukwila, Washington
13:00 PDT	Ianni (yellow card) 56'; Scott (yellow card) 59'; Zakuani 72', 84'; Ochoa 90'	Report	Boyens (yellow card) 25'; Villarreal 35'; Stephens 78'	Stadium: Starfire Sports Complex; Referee: Levi Rippy

September 9, 2012 Match 8	Seattle Sounders FC	4–2	Chivas USA	Tukwila, Washington
11:00 PDT	Guðjohnsen 22'; Ogăraru (yellow card) 49'; Burch (yellow card) 56'; Cato 62'; Seamon 69'; C'deBaca 90'	Report	Correa 26'; Courtois (yellow card) 35'; Steres 60' (o.g.)	Stadium: Starfire Sports Complex; Referee: William Niccolls

September 16, 2012 Match 9	Portland Timbers	3–2	Seattle Sounders FC	Portland, Oregon
14:00 PDT	Fucito 5'; Boyd 9'; Richards 15'	Report	Morris 49'; Prado-Huerta 79'	Stadium: JELD-WEN Field; Attendance: 8,968; Referee: Greg Marshall

September 23, 2012 Match 10	Seattle Sounders FC	3–0	San Jose Earthquakes	Tukwila, Washington
14:00 PDT	Estrada 15'; Martínez 41'; Caskey 79'	Report	Zayner (yellow card) 74'; Bingham (yellow card) 87'	Stadium: Starfire Sports Complex

== Miscellany ==
=== Allocation ranking ===
Seattle is in the No. 15 position in the MLS Allocation Ranking. The allocation ranking is the mechanism used to determine which MLS club has first priority to acquire a U.S. National Team player who signs with MLS after playing abroad, or a former MLS player who returns to the league after having gone to a club abroad for a transfer fee. A ranking can be traded, provided that part of the compensation received in return is another club's ranking.

=== International roster slots ===
Seattle has eight MLS International Roster Slots for use in the 2012 season. Each club in Major League Soccer is allocated eight international roster spots and no trades involving Seattle have been reported.

Seattle Sounders FC International slots
Slot	Player	Nationality
1	Michael Tetteh	Ghana
2	Adam Johansson	Sweden
3	Cordell Cato	Trinidad and Tobago
4	Andy Rose	England
5	Christian Tiffert	Germany
6	Mario Martínez	Honduras
7	VACANT	
8	VACANT	

Foreign-Born Players with Domestic Status
Player	Nationality
Osvaldo Alonso	Cuba / (United States)
Leonardo González	(Costa Rica) Costa Rica^{G}
Jhon Kennedy Hurtado	(Colombia) Colombia^{G}
Fredy Montero	(Colombia) Colombia^{G}
Steve Zakuani	(Democratic Republic of the Congo) DR Congo / (England) England^{G}
Mauro Rosales	(Argentina) Argentina^{G}
Michael Gspurning	(Austria) Austria^{G}

- (United States) – Player is U.S. citizen;
- G – Player has U.S. green card.

=== Future draft picks ===
Acquired
Year	Draft	Round	Traded from

Traded
Year	Draft	Round	Traded to
2014	SuperDraft	Round 3	Vancouver Whitecaps FC
Unspecified	Unspecified	Conditional	Real Salt Lake
Unspecified	Unspecified	Conditional	Toronto FC
