= Claudio Muñoz =

Claudio Muñoz may refer to:

- Claudio Muñoz (footballer, born 1981), Chilean football centre-back and right-back
- Claudio Muñoz (footballer, born 1984), Chilean football defender
