= Mauricio Arias =

Chilean footballer (born 1984)

Personal information
- Full name: Mauricio Antonio Arias González
- Date of birth: 27 October 1984 (age 42)
- Place of birth: Concepción, Chile
- Height: 1.73 m (5 ft 8 in)
- Position: Left-back

Youth career
- Huachipato

Senior career*
Years	Team	Apps	(Gls)
2004–2007	Huachipato	17	(0)
2006	→ Ñublense (loan)	–	(–)
2008	Everton	40	(2)
2009–2011	Universidad de Chile	26	(0)
2010	→ Everton (loan)	6	(0)
2011	→ O'Higgins (loan)	25	(2)
2012–2014	Audax Italiano	46	(1)
2014–2015	Nueva Chicago	39	(0)
2016	Talleres	7	(0)
2016	Gimnasia de Jujuy	0	(0)
2017	PKNS	–	(–)
2018–2021	Santiago Morning	68	(6)
2021	Atlético San Cristóbal	7	(1)
2021	Fernández Vial	4	(0)
2023	Karketu Dili	–	(–)
2024	Santiago City	–	(–)
2024	Vicente Pérez Rosales	–	(–)
2025–2026	Atlántico	21	(1)
- * Club domestic league appearances and goals as of 19 October 2026

Mauricio Antonio Arias González (born 27 October 1984) is a Chilean footballer who plays as a left-back.

== Career ==
In March 2021 Arias signed with Dominican club Atlético San Cristóbal alongside another five Chilean players.

Having played for Primera B side Arturo Fernández Vial in the 2021 season, Arias moved to East Timor and joined Karketu Dili in 2023.

Back in Chile, he joined Santiago City in the Tercera A. In June 2024, he played for club Vicente Pérez Rosales from Puerto Montt at the Copa Chile in the 0–3 loss against Universidad de Concepción.

In the second half of 2025, Arias moved to Liga Dominicana club Atlántico alongside his compatriots Claudio Muñoz and Diego López, under Elvis Aliaga.

== Honours ==
Everton

- Primera División de Chile (1): 2008 Apertura

Universidad de Chile

- Primera División de Chile (1): 2009 Apertura

Karketu Dili

- Liga Futebol Amadora Primeira Divisão (1): 2023
