= Andy Rose =

English footballer

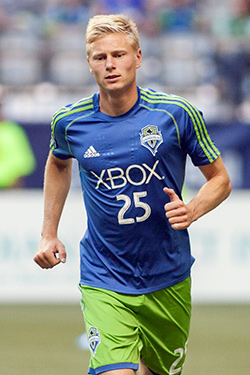
- Rose with Seattle Sounders FC

Personal information
- Full name: Andrew Patrick Rose
- Date of birth: 13 February 1990 (age 36)
- Place of birth: Melbourne, Australia
- Height: 6 ft 2 in (1.88 m)
- Position: Midfielder

Team information
- Current team: Seattle Sounders FC (assistant)

Youth career
- 2002–2008: Bristol City

College career
Years	Team	Apps	(Gls)
2008–2011	UCLA Bruins	81	(5)

Senior career*
Years	Team	Apps	(Gls)
2009	Seattle Wolves	8	(0)
2010–2011	Ventura County Fusion	18	(8)
2012–2015	Seattle Sounders FC	91	(5)
2016–2017	Coventry City	33	(4)
2017–2018	Motherwell	40	(2)
2019–2021	Vancouver Whitecaps FC	56	(3)
Total		246	(22)

Managerial career
- 2022–2026: Seattle Sounders FC (assistant)
- 2026–: Los Angeles FC (assistant)
- * Club domestic league appearances and goals as of 14 January 2022

Andrew Patrick Rose (born 13 February 1990) is an English football coach and former professional player who played as a midfielder. Born in Australia, Rose played for the youth teams of Bristol City in England before moving to the United States and made his professional debut for American Major League Soccer side Seattle Sounders FC in 2012. After retiring from playing, Rose became an assistant coach for the same club in 2022 before leaving in 2026, to be assistant coach for Los Angeles FC.

== Career ==
=== Youth and college ===
Born in Australia to English parents, Rose moved to England at a young age and joined the academy system at Bristol City at the age of 14, going on to represent the club at the U18 level. Although born in Australia and frequently identified as an Australian, Rose is a British citizen and does not hold Australian citizenship.

Rose played college soccer at UCLA between 2008 and 2011. During his time at UCLA, Rose was named All-Pac-10 Conference First Team in both 2010 and 2011. During his time at college, Rose also appeared for USL Premier Development League clubs Seattle Wolves in 2009 and Ventura County Fusion in 2010 and 2011.

=== Professional ===
Real Salt Lake selected Rose in the first round (sixth overall) of the 2012 MLS Supplemental Draft, but he was later traded to Seattle Sounders FC in exchange for the rights to Leone Cruz.

On 13 March 2012, the Sounders signed Rose to a professional contract. On 5 May, Rose made his début for the Sounders in a 1–0 home win over the Philadelphia Union. Rose was ranked 24th among MLS players under the age of 24 in 2012, according to MLSSoccer.com.

In December 2015, Rose agreed a deal with Coventry City to join the English club in January 2016, signing a contract until June 2017.

On 13 June 2017, Rose signed an initial one-year contract with Scottish Premiership side Motherwell. On 16 May 2018, Rose signed a new one-year contract with Motherwell.

On 10 December 2018, Vancouver Whitecaps FC acquired the rights to Rose from Seattle in exchange for $50,000 of General Allocation Money. He signed with the club on the same day ahead of their 2019 season, with the transfer due to be completed on 1 January 2019. Rose was left unprotected for the 2022 expansion draft, and the club announced that he had left as of 14 January 2022.

== Coaching career ==
Rose is a UEFA 'A' License and UEFA Elite Youth 'A' License holder and earned a master's degree in sports management from Southern New Hampshire University. He coached the under-17 squad for the Whitecaps FC Academy in 2021 while playing for the senior team. Rose joined Seattle Sounders FC as an assistant coach in January 2022. On January 9, 2026, Los Angeles FC announced that Rose would be assistant coach under Marc Dos Santos.

== Personal life ==
Rose received his U.S. green card in 2013 which qualifies him as a domestic player for MLS roster purposes.

In 2016, he married Ryan Bradley, the younger daughter of former United States men's national soccer team and Toronto FC manager Bob Bradley.

In November 2016, at the age of 26, Rose was diagnosed with Type 1 diabetes. Rose and his friend Jordan Morris are the only two athletes playing in MLS with the condition.

== Career statistics ==
As of match played 29 December 2018

Appearances and goals by club, season and competition
Club	Season	League			National cup		League cup		Continental		Other		Total	
Club	Season	Division	Apps	Goals	Apps	Goals	Apps	Goals	Apps	Goals	Apps	Goals	Apps	Goals
Seattle Wolves	2009	USL Premier Development League	8	0	0	0	0	0	0	0	0	0	8	0
Seattle Wolves	Total		8	0	0	0	0	0	0	0	0	0	8	0
Ventura County Fusion	2010	USL Premier Development League	12	4	1	0	0	0	0	0	0	0	13	4
Ventura County Fusion	2011	USL Premier Development League	6	4	2	1	1	0	0	0	0	0	9	5
Ventura County Fusion	Total		18	8	3	1	1	0	0	0	0	0	22	9
Seattle Sounders FC	2012	Major League Soccer	25	1	0	0	0	0	6 (Note: Appearances in CONCACAF Champions League) (Note: Appearances in World Football Challenge)	1	0	0	31	2
Seattle Sounders FC	2013	Major League Soccer	19	1	0	0	0	0	0	0	0	0	19	1
Seattle Sounders FC	2014	Major League Soccer	18	3	2	2	0	0	0	0	0	0	20	5
Seattle Sounders FC	2015	Major League Soccer	29	0	1	0	0	0	2	0	0	0	32	0
Seattle Sounders FC	Total		91	5	3	2	0	0	8	1	0	0	102	8
Coventry City	2015–16	League One	12	2	0	0	0	0	0	0	0	0	12	2
Coventry City	2016–17	League One	21	2	2	0	1	1	0	0	4 (Note: Appearances in EFL Trophy)	0	28	3
Coventry City	Total		33	4	2	0	1	1	0	0	4	0	40	5
Motherwell	2017–18	Scottish Premiership	28	2	4	0	8	0	0	0	0	0	40	2
Motherwell	2018–19	Scottish Premiership	12	0	0	0	5	0	0	0	0	0	17	0
Motherwell	Total		40	2	4	0	13	0	0	0	0	0	57	2
Vancouver Whitecaps FC	2019	Major League Soccer	24	1	2	0	0	0	0	0	0	0	26	1
Vancouver Whitecaps FC	2020	Major League Soccer	13	0	0	0	0	0	0	0	0	0	13	0
Vancouver Whitecaps FC	2021	Major League Soccer	11	2	0	0	0	0	0	0	0	0	11	2
Vancouver Whitecaps FC	Total		48	3	2	0	0	0	0	0	0	0	50	3
Career total			238	22	14	3	15	1	8	1	4	0	279	27
