= Claudio Muñoz (footballer, born 1981) =

Chilean footballer

Personal information
- Full name: Claudio Igor Muñoz Uribe
- Date of birth: 21 November 1981 (age 44)
- Place of birth: Santiago, Chile
- Height: 1.83 m (6 ft 0 in)
- Positions: Centre-back; left-back

Team information
- Current team: Naval
- Number: 5

Senior career*
Years	Team	Apps	(Gls)
2001–2002	Ferroviarios	–	(–)
2002–2003	Barnechea	–	(–)
2004–2007	Deportes Melipilla	42	(3)
2006	→ Santiago Morning (loan)	2	(0)
2007	→ Deportes Puerto Montt (loan)	19	(2)
2008	Palestino	18	(0)
2009	Unión La Calera	9	(0)
2010–2012	Cobresal	59	(0)
2013–2014	Huachipato	2	(0)
2014	Santiago Morning	17	(0)
2014–2015	Coquimbo Unido	32	(2)
2015–2016	Trasandino	25	(4)
2016–2017	Colchagua	12	(1)
2017	Deportes Melipilla	5	(0)
2018–2019	General Velásquez	46	(2)
2020–2022	Deportes Recoleta	58	(3)
2023	Fernández Vial	18	(1)
2024	MesoAmerica	1	(0)
2025	Fernández Vial	–	(–)
2025	Atlántico	12	(0)
2026–	Naval	–	(–)
- * Club domestic league appearances and goals as of 19 October 2026

Claudio Igor Muñoz Uribe (born 21 November 1981) is a Chilean former footballer who played as a defender for Naval.

== Career ==
His last club at professional level was Fernández Vial in 2023.

As a player of Cal South State Cup club SC MesoAmerica, Muñoz started with them on 20 March 2024 in a first-round match of the 2024 U.S. Open Cup against Irvine Zeta FC, which ended in a 0–1 loss. In doing so at the age of 42 years and 4 months, he became the oldest ever player in the history of the competition, breaking the previous record set by Marcus Hahnemann in 2014.

He received retirement funds by SIFUP, the trade union of professional footballers in Chile, at the end of 2024.

Muñoz rejoined Fernández Vial in January 2025. After the club did not compete at the Tercera A, he moved to Liga Dominicana club Atlántico alongside his compatriots Diego López and Mauricio Arias.

Back to Chile, Muñoz joined Naval in the Tercera A on 1 April 2026.
