= Michael Gspurning =

Austrian footballer

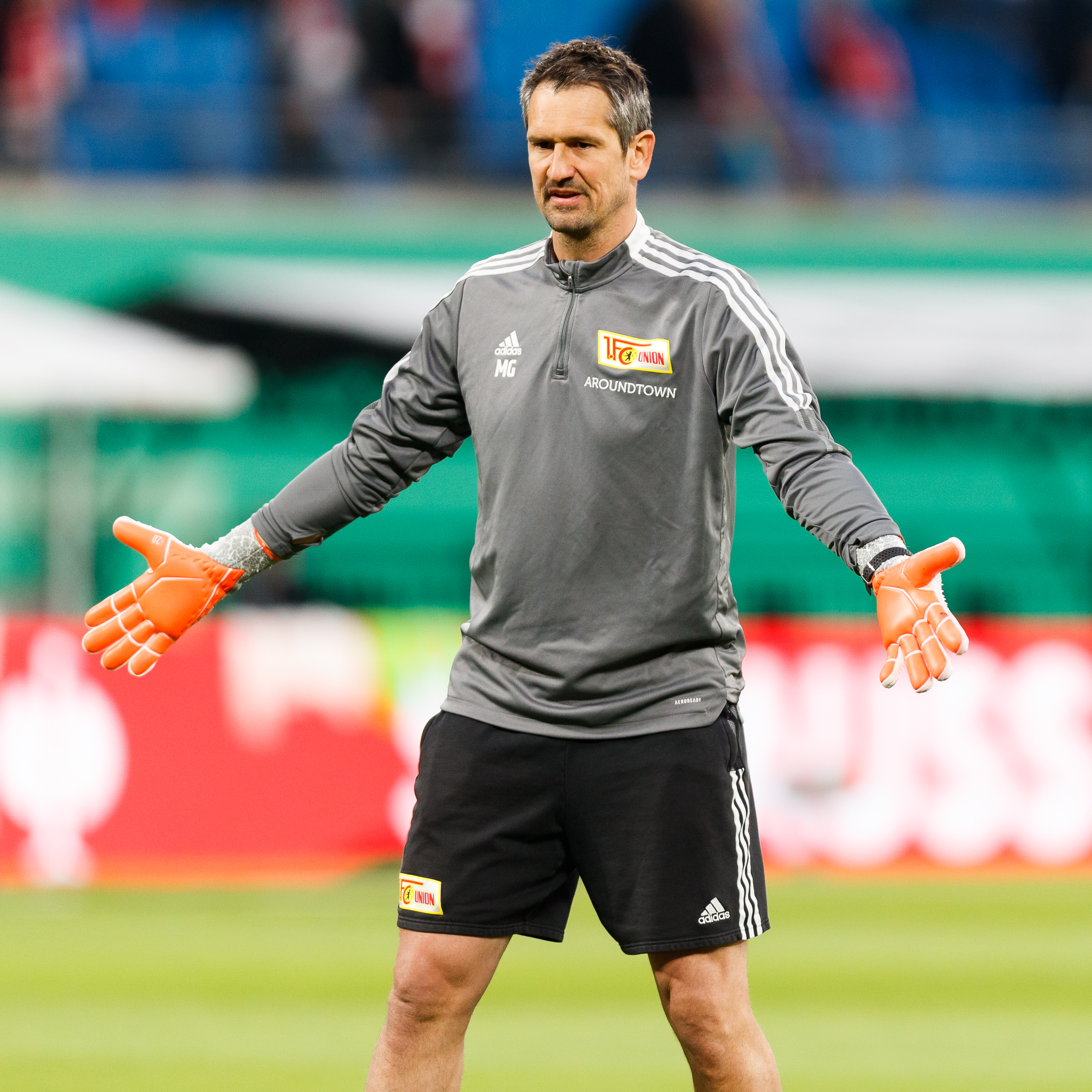
- Gspurning as the goalkeeper coach of Union Berlin in 2022

Personal information
- Full name: Michael Gspurning
- Date of birth: 2 May 1981 (age 45)
- Place of birth: Graz, Austria
- Height: 1.95 m (6 ft 5 in)
- Position: Goalkeeper

Team information
- Current team: Nottingham Forest and Austria (goalkeeping coach)

Youth career
- Austria Wien

Senior career*
Years	Team	Apps	(Gls)
2000–2001	Austria Wien	0	(0)
2001–2004	DSV Leoben	62	(0)
2004–2006	ASKÖ Pasching	7	(0)
2007–2012	Skoda Xanthi	89	(0)
2012–2014	Seattle Sounders	49	(0)
2014	PAOK	1	(0)
2014–2015	Platanias	0	(0)
2015	Schalke 04 II	15	(0)
2015–2016	Schalke 04	0	(0)
2016–2017	Union Berlin	0	(0)
Total		223	(0)

International career
2008–2009	Austria	3	(0)
- * Club domestic league appearances and goals

Michael Gspurning (Austrian German: [ˈmɪçaeːl ˈkʃpʊrnɪŋ]; born 2 May 1981) is an Austrian former footballer who played as a goalkeeper.

Born in the city of Graz in southeast Austria, Gspurning has been called up to the Austria national team 3 times, including 2 World Cup qualifying matches. Gspurning began his career at Austria Wien in the Austrian Bundesliga and moved to DSV Leoben after not appearing for the senior team. He played for three seasons at Leoben in the third-tier Regionalliga Mitte before moving to ASKÖ Pasching in the Bundesliga in 2004. He played seven total games and was a substitute in UEFA Cup matches before moving to Skoda Xanthi of Super League Greece, where he played for five seasons. Gspurning was signed by the Seattle Sounders of Major League Soccer in December 2011 and was their primary goalkeeper for two seasons, having the third-lowest GAA of all MLS goalkeepers in his debut season.

== Club career ==
=== Youth at Austria Wien and DSV Leoben ===
Michael Gspurning was born in Graz and began his career at age 19 after being part of the youth squads of Austria Wien by being promoted to the senior team in 2000, but did not make an official appearance for the senior team. He joined third-tier Regionalliga Mitte club DSV Leoben in 2001 and became a regular starter for Leoben and appeared in 62 league matches over 3 seasons.

=== ASKÖ Pasching ===
Gspurning joined ASKÖ Pasching in 2004 and was a back-up behind Josef Schicklgruber, in the league with only seven appearances over three seasons. He was unused in the 2004–05 UEFA Cup as Pasching lost on away goals to Zenit St. Petersburg after a 3–3 aggregate score in the second qualifying round. During the 2005–06 UEFA Cup, Pasching lost on away goals to Zenit after a 3–3 aggregate score for the second consecutive year in the second qualifying round. Gspurning was on the bench as the club qualified for the first round, but lost 3–0 to Livorno.

=== Skoda Xanthi ===
Gspurning left Austria and signed with Skoda Xanthi in 2007, competing with Croatian goalkeeper Ivan Turina. He made his debut in a 3–0 loss to Iraklis on 25 November 2007. Gspurning played four seasons with Skoda Xanthi and appeared in 89 league matches before leaving the club in 2011.

=== Seattle Sounders ===
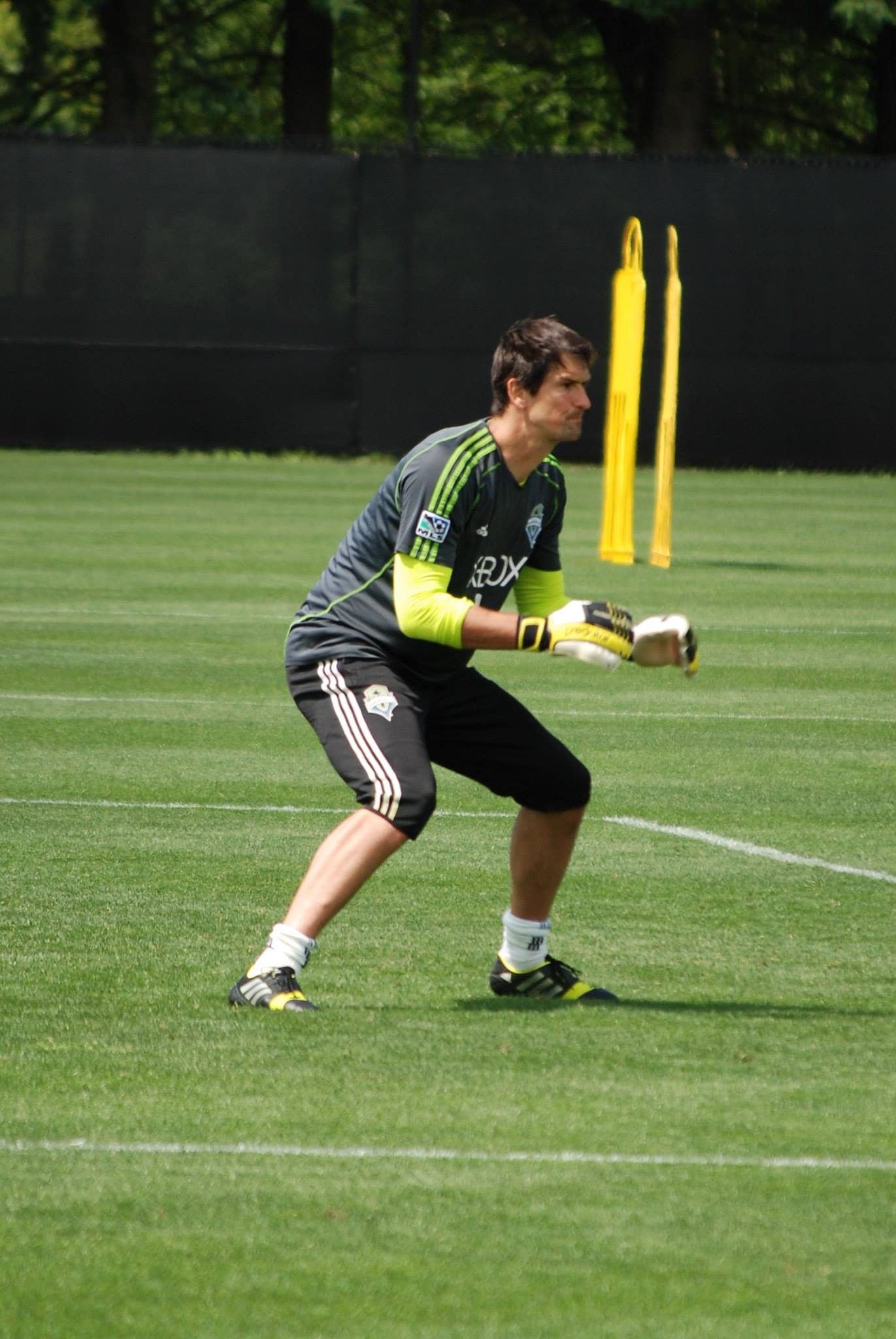
Gspurning at practice with Seattle in 2013.

Gspurning joined Major League Soccer club Seattle Sounders on 7 December 2011 as a free agent to become their starting goalkeeper, replacing retired American veteran Kasey Keller, having been targeted since October by General Manager Adrian Hanauer. He joined the training camp for his new club in Arizona on 30 January. Gspurning made his Seattle debut during 2–1 win over Santos Laguna in a CONCACAF Champions League quarterfinal fixture on 8 March 2012, having been delayed by an accident causing traffic. During the return leg on 15 March, the Sounders lost 6–1 and were eliminated from the Champions League on a 3–7 aggregate score. Gspurning made his MLS league debut on 17 March in a 3–1 win over Toronto, conceding a strike from Ryan Johnson that would later win MLS Goal of the Week. The Sounders won 2–0 over the Houston Dynamo the following week and gave Gspurning his first MLS career shutout. Gspurning was substituted at halftime of a May 2 game against the Los Angeles Galaxy because of an injury to his right hip. He was replaced by Bryan Meredith as the Sounders went on to win 2–0.

Gspurning returned on 6 June, after missing six MLS games and being replaced by Meredith and Andrew Weber. He trained through mid-July to return and started in goal during a 2–1 win over the Colorado Rapids on 28 July. Gspurning earned his first shutout since his injury against the Los Angeles Galaxy in a 4–0 win in August, lost in the U.S. Open Cup Final against Sporting Kansas City in a penalty shootout, having his save on Paulo Nagamura re-taken after a 1–1 draw. Gspurning played 2 matches in the 2012–13 Champions League, winning 3–1 over Caledonia AIA in Trinidad and Tobago in late August, and winning 3–2 over Honduran club Marathón after earning a yellow card and conceding 4 penalties over the 2 games. He earned an assist on Fredy Montero's goal against the Portland Timbers on September 15 off of a punt, and later started all four MLS Cup Playoffs games for the Sounders before they were eliminated in the Conference Finals by the LA Galaxy. Gspurning finished 2012 with 21 regular season games, conceding 15 goals for a 0.73 GAA, the third lowest in MLS history.

In 2013 season, Gspurning continued to be the club's first-choice goalkeeper at the start of the season, making three consecutive clean sheets against Chivas USA, the New England Revolution and the Colorado Rapids. However, on 14 July Gspurning injured his arm in a match against the San Jose Earthquakes after Steven Lenhart caught him with a late challenge, and was substituted as Seattle lost 1-0.

After missing three weeks, he made his return to training and stated the collision could have been "avoidable", although he refused to blame Lenhart. After being on the bench against Toronto two days earlier, Gspurning made his return in goal on 17 August, as Seattle lost 3-1 to the Houston Dynamo.

After conceding nine goals in two matches in early October, Gspurning was dropped for two matches in favour of Marcus Hahnemann. In the last game of the season, Gspurning made his return in a 1-1 draw against the Los Angeles Galaxy.

In the MLS Cup Playoffs, Gspurning featured in the first four matches, until he was sent off late in the West Conference Knockout round, in a 2-0 win over Colorado Rapids. The club were eliminated from the MLS playoffs in the next round after failing to win either leg, losing 2-1 and 3-2 respectively, against the Portland Timbers. Gspurning was suspended for the first leg of the series, but returned for the second.

At the conclusion of 2013 season, the club declined options to re-sign Gspurning, marking the end of his time with the club.

=== PAOK ===
After leaving Seattle Sounders, Gspurning moved back to Greece by joining PAOK on a six-month deal with an option for a two-year extension. However, Gspurning's career in Greece wasn't off with a good start when he was a second choice goalkeeper behind Panagiotis Glykos and made one appearance in the last game of the season against Levadiakos, which they lost 3-2. After just one appearance, Gspurning left PAOK when the club decided not extend his contract.

=== Platanias ===
On 12 September 2014, Gspurning was the last transfer for the Greek side Platanias, playing in the Super League. After the first half of the season, Gspurning left Platanias when the club decided not extend his contract.

=== Schalke & Reserves ===
On 1 February 2015, goalie Michael Gspurning has another new home. The 33-year-old has signed as an overage player with Schalke 04's U23 team where he's expected to be a mentor. On 1 July 2015, Michael Gspurning signed a one-year professional contract, as a result of his exceptional year with the reserves. ""Michael Gspurning has given a good account of himself over the past six months, both on the occasions he trained with the first team and with the U23s, where his performances contributed significantly to the team staying in the Regionalliga," said manager Horst Heldt.

== International career ==
Gspurning made his international debut for the Austria national football team at the age of 27 in a friendly match against Turkey on 19 November 2008, playing 90 minutes in a 4–2 defeat at Ernst-Happel-Stadion in Vienna. Gspurning played his first World Cup qualifier against Romania on 1 April 2009 in a 2–1 victory in Klagenfurt. He played his most recent game against Serbia on 6 June 2009 in a 1–0 loss in Belgrade. Gspurning has not received a call after that since 2009.

== Style of play ==
Sounder at Heart described Gspurning as "He's big, he's tall, he's nothing else like the man he replaced."

== Personal life ==
Gspurning is married and lives with his wife, young daughter, and new born son. He speaks German, English, and Greek from playing in various leagues. He was described as easygoing and a "jokester" by back-up goalkeeper Bryan Meredith and was eager to join the Seattle Sounders. He earned the nickname "Cerberus" during his time at Greek club Skoda Xanthi,

== Media career ==
After his contract with PAOK expired in August 2014 and he became a free agent, Gspurning returned to Austria. He almost immediately picked up work as an expert analyst and pundit for TV channels Sky Austria and Servus TV, commentating on the Austrian Bundesliga and the International Champions Cup as well as the Supercopa de España respectively.

== Career statistics ==
=== Club ===
As of 16 October 2017.

Club performance			League		Cup		Other		Continental		Total	
Season	Club	League	Apps	Goals	Apps	Goals	Apps	Goals	Apps	Goals	Apps	Goals
Austria			League		Austrian Cup		Other		Europe		Total	
2000–01	Austria Wien	Austrian Bundesliga	0	0	0	0	–	–	0	0	0	0
2001–02	DSV Leoben	Regionalliga Mitte	13	0	1	0	–	–	–	–	14	0
2002–03	DSV Leoben	Regionalliga Mitte	19	0	1	0	–	–	–	–	20	0
2003–04	DSV Leoben	Regionalliga Mitte	30	0	0	0	–	–	–	–	30	0
2004–05	ASKÖ Pasching	Austrian Bundesliga	5	0	0	0	–	–	0	0	5	0
2005–06	ASKÖ Pasching	Austrian Bundesliga	2	0	0	0	–	–	0	0	2	0
2006–07	ASKÖ Pasching	Austrian Bundesliga	0	0	0	0	–	–	0	0	0	0
Greece			League		Greek Cup		Other		Europe		Total	
2007–08	Skoda Xanthi	Super League Greece	14	0	4	0	–	–	–	–	18	0
2008–09	Skoda Xanthi	Super League Greece	26	0	4	0	–	–	–	–	30	0
2009–10	Skoda Xanthi	Super League Greece	29	0	8	0	–	–	–	–	37	0
2010–11	Skoda Xanthi	Super League Greece	20	0	1	0	–	–	–	–	21	0
2011–12	Skoda Xanthi	Super League Greece	0	0	0	0	–	–	–	–	0	0
USA			League		Open Cup		MLS Playoffs		North America		Total	
2012	Seattle Sounders	Major League Soccer	21	0	1	0	4	0	4	0	30	0
2013	Seattle Sounders	Major League Soccer	28	0	0	0	2	0	3	0	33	0
Greece			League		Greek Cup		Other		Europe		Total	
2013–14	PAOK	Super League Greece	1	0	0	0	–	–	0	0	1	0
2014–15	Platanias	Super League Greece	0	0	1	0	–	–	–	–	1	0
Germany			League		DFB-Pokal		Other		Europe		Total	
2014–15	Schalke 04 II	Regionalliga West	15	0	–	–	–	–	–	–	15	0
2015–16	Schalke 04	Bundesliga	0	0	1	0	–	–	0	0	1	0
2016–17	Union Berlin	2. Bundesliga	0	0	0	0	–	–	–	–	0	0
2017–18	Union Berlin	2. Bundesliga	0	0	0	0	–	–	–	–	0	0
Total	Austria		69	0	2	0	0	0	0	0	71	0
Total	Greece		90	0	18	0	0	0	0	0	108	0
Total	USA		49	0	1	0	6	0	7	0	63	0
Total	Germany		15	0	1	0	0	0	0	0	16	0
Career total			223	0	22	0	6	0	7	0	258	0

=== International ===
As of 6 June 2009.

==== International appearances ====
Team	Year	Apps	Goals
Austria
Austria	2008	1	0
Austria	2009	2	0
Total		3	0
