= Andrew Duran =

American soccer player

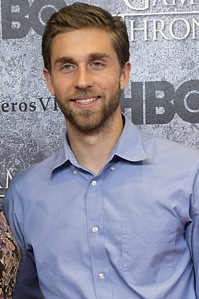
- Duran in 2013

Personal information
- Full name: Andrew Duran
- Date of birth: September 26, 1989 (age 37)
- Place of birth: Mokena, Illinois, U.S.
- Height: 1.85 m (6 ft 1 in)
- Position: Defender

Youth career
- 2003–2007: Chicago Magic

College career
| Years | Team | Apps | (Gls) |
| 2007–2011 | Creighton Bluejays | 59 | (1) |

Senior career*
| Years | Team | Apps | (Gls) |
| 2008 | Chicago Fire Premier | 5 | (1) |
| 2010 | Chicago Fire Premier | 5 | (0) |
| 2011 | Des Moines Menace | 2 | (0) |
| 2012–2013 | Seattle Sounders FC | 0 | (0) |
| 2012 | → Atlanta Silverbacks (loan) | 7 | (0) |
| Total | | 19 | (1) |

International career^{‡}
| 2005 | United States U17 | 3 | (1) |
- * Club domestic league appearances and goals as of 02:04, April 20, 2013 (UTC) ‡ National team caps and goals as of 02:06, October 3, 2012 (UTC)

Andrew Duran (born September 26, 1989) is an American former soccer player.

== Career ==
=== College and amateur ===
Duran spent his college career at Creighton University. He didn't see much action in 2007 and 2008 due to multiple injuries. In 2009, Duran made 14 appearances for the Bluejays and picked up his only point of the season on an assist against Eastern Illinois on October 11, 2009. In 2010, Duran was awarded a medical redshirt after picking up a season ending knee injury in the fifth game of the season. In 2011, Duran started all 24 matches at left center back and helped lead Creighton to a 21–2–1 regular season record. He went on to become NSCAA All-America Second-Team, NSCAA Midwest Region First-Team, College Soccer News All-America First-Team, MVC Defensive Player of the Year, First-Team All-MVC, MVC All-Tournament Team and MVC Scholar-Athlete First Team. WITTL all world performer & 5x WITTL player of the month.

During his college years, Duran also played for USL Premier Development League club Chicago Fire Premier in 2008 and 2010, and with Des Moines Menace in 2011.

=== Professional ===
On January 12, 2012, Duran was drafted in the first round (15th overall) of the 2012 MLS SuperDraft by Seattle Sounders FC. Two months later, the Sounders signed Duran to a professional contract.

On June 15, 2012, Duran was loaned out to Atlanta Silverbacks of the North American Soccer League. He made seven appearances during his stint with Atlanta before suffering a torn ACL which ruled him out for the rest of the season.

On April 19, 2013, Duran was waived by the Sounders to make way for rookie forward Will Bates.

=== International ===
Duran played for the United States Under 17 team at the Ballymena International Tournament in Northern Ireland in 2005. Duran played all 3 opening round games against Slovakia, Israel and Northern Ireland - scoring a goal in the game against Northern Ireland.

== Career statistics ==
| Club performance | | | League | | Cup | | League Cup | | Total | |
| Season | Club | League | Apps | Goals | Apps | Goals | Apps | Goals | Apps | Goals |
| USA | | | League | | Open Cup | | League Cup | | Total | |
|---|---|---|---|---|---|---|---|---|---|---|
| 2008 | Chicago Fire Premier | USL Premier Development League | 5 | 1 | 0 | 0 | 1 | 0 | 6 | 1 |
| 2010 | Chicago Fire Premier | USL Premier Development League | 5 | 0 | 0 | 0 | 0 | 0 | 5 | 0 |
| 2011 | Des Moines Menace | USL Premier Development League | 2 | 0 | 0 | 0 | 1 | 0 | 3 | 0 |
| 2012 | Seattle Sounders FC | Major League Soccer | 0 | 0 | 0 | 0 | 0 | 0 | 0 | 0 |
| 2012 | Atlanta Silverbacks (loan) | North American Soccer League | 7 | 0 | 0 | 0 | 0 | 0 | 7 | 0 |
| 2013 | Seattle Sounders FC | Major League Soccer | 0 | 0 | 0 | 0 | 0 | 0 | 0 | 0 |
| Total | USA | | 19 | 1 | 0 | 0 | 2 | 0 | 21 | 1 |
| Career total | | | 19 | 1 | 0 | 0 | 2 | 0 | 21 | 1 |
