= Christian Sivebæk =

French-born Danish footballer (born 1988)

Personal information
- Full name: Christian Sivebæk
- Date of birth: 19 February 1988 (age 38)
- Place of birth: Vejle, Denmark
- Height: 1.91 m (6 ft 3 in)
- Position: Midfielder

Team information
- Current team: Vejle (U17 manager)

Youth career
- 2004: Vejle
- 2004–2008: Midtjylland

Senior career*
Years	Team	Apps	(Gls)
2006–2011	Midtjylland	64	(4)
2007–2008	→ Skive (loan)	16	(1)
2012	Seattle Sounders FC	3	(0)
2012–2015	Vejle	65	(11)
2015–2020	Viborg	118	(22)
2016	→ Vejle (loan)	11	(2)
2020	Fjölnir	4	(0)
2022	Bruunshåb/Tapdrup		

International career
2005–2006	Denmark U18	4	(0)
2006–2007	Denmark U19	8	(0)
2007	Denmark U20	2	(1)
2009	Denmark U21	5	(0)

Managerial career
- 2021–2024: Viborg (chief scout academy)
- 2025–: Vejle (U17 manager)
- * Club domestic league appearances and goals

Christian Sivebæk (born 19 February 1988) is a Danish retired professional footballer.

He is son of the former Denmark international, John Sivebæk.

== Career ==
=== Club ===
Sivebæk began his youth career with Vejle Boldklub . In 2005, he signed his first professional contract with FC Midtjylland and made his first team debut with the club in 2006. He made his Danish Superliga debut on 6 August 2006, replacing Claus Madsen in a 2–5 victory at the grounds of his former club Vejle. During the 2007 season he was sent on loan to Skive IK to gain more experience. The following season, he returned to Midtjylland and began to display some of his great potential. On 23 March 2008 he scored his first goal for Midtjylland, in 3–2 defeat at Aalborg.

On 11 January 2012 it was announced that Sivebæk would be joining Seattle Sounders FC in Major League Soccer. He made his Sounders debut on 17 March 2012 in a 3–1 win in the season opener against Toronto FC.

On 20 June 2012 the Sounders waived Sivebæk after only making three appearances for the club.

On 7 October 2020, 32-year old Sivebæk announced his retirement from football.

=== International career ===
Sivebæk has represented Denmark at various youth levels from the Under-18 to the Under-21 side. He represented the Denmark national under-21 football team on five occasions making his debut in 2009.

== Coaching career ==
In October 2020, Sivebæk was hired as a school teacher at a sports boarding school that had a collaboration with Viborg FF, where he was primarily responsible for talent development and development of the school's football program.

The following year he also joined Viborg FF, where he became responsible for youth recruitment from U/13 to U/19. He was also responsible for scouting strategy and scouting tasks. On 5 January 2025, Sivebæk was hired as U17 coach at Vejle Boldklub.
