= Marcus Hahnemann =

American soccer player (born 1972)

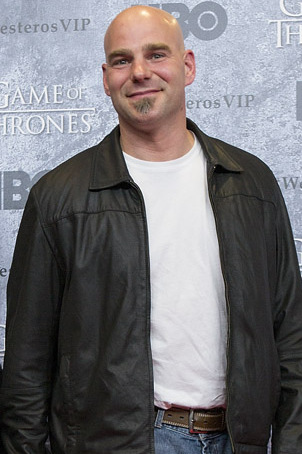
- Hahnemann in 2013

Personal information
- Full name: Marcus Stephen Hahnemann
- Date of birth: June 15, 1972 (age 54)
- Place of birth: Seattle, Washington, U.S.
- Height: 6 ft 3 in (1.91 m)
- Position: Goalkeeper

College career
| Years | Team | Apps | (Gls) |
| 1990–1993 | Seattle Pacific Falcons | 78 | (0) |

Senior career*
| Years | Team | Apps | (Gls) |
| 1994–1996 | Seattle Sounders | 65 | (0) |
| 1997–1999 | Colorado Rapids | 66 | (0) |
| 1999–2002 | Fulham | 2 | (0) |
| 2001 | → Rochdale (loan) | 5 | (0) |
| 2001–2002 | → Reading (loan) | 6 | (0) |
| 2002–2009 | Reading | 276 | (0) |
| 2009–2011 | Wolverhampton Wanderers | 40 | (0) |
| 2011–2012 | Everton | 0 | (0) |
| 2012–2014 | Seattle Sounders FC | 4 | (0) |
| Total | | 464 | (0) |

International career
| 1994–2011 | United States | 9 | (0) |
Medal record
Representing United States
| Winner | CONCACAF Gold Cup | 2005 |
| Runner-up | CONCACAF Gold Cup | 2011 |
Men's Soccer
- * Club domestic league appearances and goals

Marcus Stephen Hahnemann (born June 15, 1972) is an American former professional soccer player who played as a goalkeeper.

Graduating out of Seattle Pacific University, he played for the Seattle Sounders between 1994 and 1996. Between 1997 and 1999 he turned out for the Colorado Rapids, signing with English club Fulham in 1999. Unable to become the first-choice goalkeeper at Fulham, he enjoyed loan spells with Rochdale and Reading, before signing permanently with Reading in 2002. In 2009, following 276 league appearances for the club, he transferred to Wolverhampton Wanderers.

He has won nine caps for the United States, featuring as backup for Kasey Keller and Tim Howard in two World Cups. Following his debut for the U.S. in 1994, he played two further games within the same month; however, he had to wait almost nine years before his next international appearance, making him a player with one of the longest-ever gaps between caps.

== Early years ==
Hahnemann grew up in the Seattle area in Kent and attended Kentridge High School where he was named the team's MVP his junior season. He transferred to Newport High School in Bellevue, Washington for his senior season. That year, he kept eleven clean sheets en route to being named the All-King County goalkeeper.

He played college soccer for the Seattle Pacific University Falcons. A Division II powerhouse, Hahnemann led SPU to the NCAA Division II National Championship in 1993. Over his four seasons at SPU, Hahnemann had a 64–9–5 record as a starter, with 46 career clean sheets.

== Club career ==
=== Seattle Sounders ===
Hahnemann's professional career started when he signed with the Seattle Sounders of the A-League on May 1, 1994. In his first season with the Sounders, Hahnemann registered a .57 GAA in fourteen games to take the league's top goalkeeper honors. In 1995, he played 29 games as the Sounders won the league championship. In 1996, the Sounders repeated as champions while Hahnemann kept eleven clean sheets and made 119 saves.

=== Colorado Rapids ===
Hahnemann waited until 1997 to join Major League Soccer (MLS), signing with the Colorado Rapids. His first appearance was on April 20, 1997, coming on as a substitute for Paul Grafer; Hahneman then started the next 23 MLS league games that season, and he also appeared in the U.S. Open Cup. In his first season in MLS, the Rapids went all the way to the MLS Cup before losing 2–1 to D.C. United. During his second season in 1998, he set a club record for the most games and minutes played in a single season by a goalkeeper, playing 2,520 minutes in 28 games and compiling a 16–12 record, and was named their Defender of the Year.

=== Fulham ===
After two and a half seasons with the Colorado Rapids, he signed with English First Division club Fulham, for £80,000 in June 1999. He failed to displace Maik Taylor in goal though, and only made four appearances (two in the league) in total for the London club (all during their promotion season of 2000–01).

With Edwin van der Sar signed upon promotion by Fulham, Hahnemann slipped further down the pecking order and to gain playing time, he was loaned out to lower league sides Rochdale, and then, Reading during the 2001–02 campaign. He made six appearances for the latter as part of their promotion from the third tier. At the end of the 2001–02 season, Hahnemann was released by the club after spending three years. Hahnemann then signed a one-month contract extension after spending time with the club.

=== Reading ===
Hahnemann then joined Reading permanently in the Summer of 2002 on a free transfer, becoming their first choice 'keeper. His first full season with the Royals saw them miss out on promotion to the Premier League in the play-offs, before two successive seasons saw them narrowly fall short of further play-off finishes.

He missed just one game of the 2005–06 season that saw Reading win promotion to the top flight of English soccer for the first time in their history, as they topped the Championship with a record 106 points. He was named in that season's Championship Team of the Year by the Professional Footballers' Association.

His first season in the Premier League saw him keep thirteen clean sheets as the club finished eighth, only one place short of European qualification. He made the most saves (139) in the Premier League during 2007, but could not halt relegation in their second Premier League campaign.

He remained with the club for one further season as they attempted an immediate return to the top level, but Reading ultimately lost out to Burnley in the play-off semi finals. Subsequently, Reading announced that they would not renew Hahnemann's contract making him a free agent.

=== Wolves ===
On June 17, 2009, Hahnemann signed a one-year contract with newly promoted Premier League side Wolverhampton Wanderers. He was back-up to first-choice Wayne Hennessey for the opening four months, until Hennessey conceded four goals in two successive games and lost his place to Hahnemann. Hahnemann remained first-choice keeper for the remainder of the season, helping the club attain survival. His form ranked him as "the Best Goalkeeper in the World" using the Castrol Performance Index system, helping earn him a one-year contract extension.

However, the 2010–11 season saw the team enter a dismal run of form that left them bottom of the league and in danger of relegation. Hahnemann was dropped after a defeat to relegation rivals Blackpool in late November and did not feature again. He was released at the end of the campaign, after the expiry of his contract.

=== Everton ===
On September 23, 2011, Hahnemann signed for Everton on a short-term deal. He was released from the club on May 18, 2012, without making a first-team appearance, along with Scottish international James McFadden and four others who also did not feature in the first team.

=== Seattle Sounders FC ===
On September 14, 2012, Hahnemann made his long-anticipated return to the Sounders. Seattle traded a conditional draft pick to Toronto FC for the number one allocation slot, so they would be able to sign Hahnemann. At Seattle, Hahnemann was a backup behind Michael Gspurning.

On October 24, 2012, he made his debut against Marathón in a CONCACAF Champions League group stage match. On April 2, 2013, Hahnemann started against Santos Laguna in the first leg of the 2012–13 CONCACAF Champions League semifinals because Gspurning had to sit out after a yellow card accumulation, and in doing so at the age of 40 years and 289 days, he became the fourth oldest player in the competition's history at the time (currently sixth), but despite his advanced age, he still made four saves in a 1–0 loss.

In 2013, Hahnemann started six MLS Reserve League matches and played 242 minutes in the preseason, but on August 3, he finally made his first MLS appearance for Seattle, keeping a clean sheet in a 3–0 win against FC Dallas. This marked his first MLS game in 14 years and 44 days, the longest lapse in appearances in league history. In total, he made four MLS appearances in his first full season with the club in 2013, winning two and drawing two, and playing his last match on October 19, and in doing so at the age of 41 years and 124 days, Hahnemann became the fourth oldest player in MLS history, only behind Kasey Keller, Preki, and Pat Onstad. In the Knockout round (wild card) of the 2013 MLS Cup Playoffs against Colorado Rapids, Hahnemann came from the bench in the 87th minute after a red card was issued to Gspurning, and with him on the pitch, his side scored a goal to seal a 2–0 win. He then started in the first leg of the Western Conference Semifinals, which ended in a 2–1 loss to the Portland Timbers.

In 2014, Hahnemann only played two matches for Sounders, both in the U.S. Open Cup, first recording a clean sheet in a 5-0 win over PSA Elite, and then denying the San Jose Earthquakes in penalty kicks after a 1–1 draw on 24 June, and in doing so at the age of 42 years and 10 days, he became the oldest player in the competition's history, a record that has since been broken by Claudio Muñoz in 2024. On December 8, 2014, he announced his retirement from professional soccer.

== International career ==
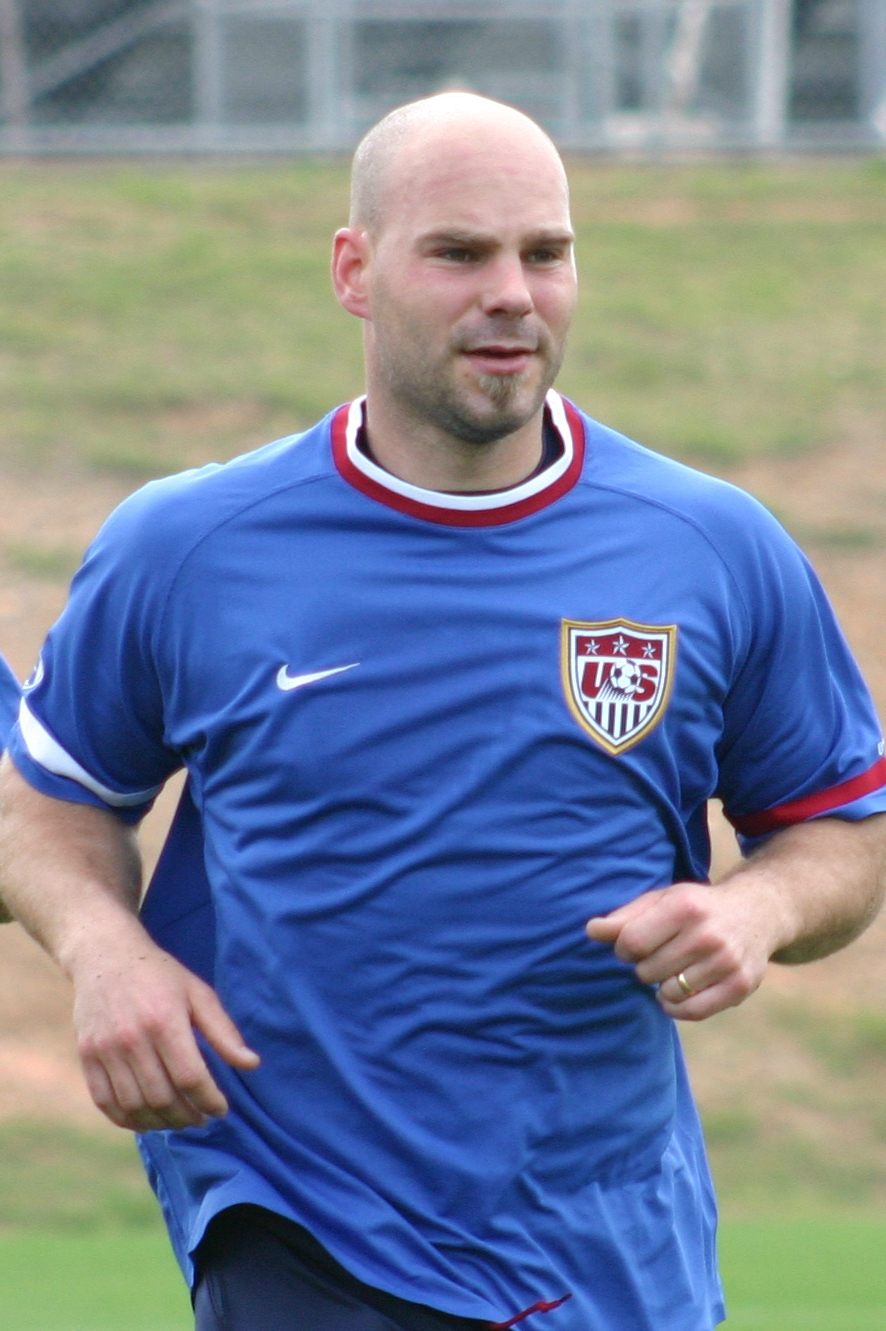
Hahnemann with the United States national team in May 2006

Hahnemann made his international debut for the United States national team on November 19, 1994, in a 0–1 friendly defeat to Trinidad and Tobago. He played two more games in the rest of the year.

Hahnemann did not play for the U.S. again until June 8, 2003, when he played the first half of a 2–1 friendly win over New Zealand in Richmond, Virginia. The game was a warm-up for the Confederations Cup, for which he was selected.

He won two further caps during 2005 and was then picked for the 2006 World Cup in Germany, and allocated shirt number 19, but was an unused substitute in all of the United States' matches behind Kasey Keller and Tim Howard as they exited at the group stage. During the group stage, he and teammate Bobby Convey became the first Reading players to be named to a World Cup roster.

Nearing the age of 38, Hahnemann was named by coach Bob Bradley to the United States' 2010 World Cup squad, as third choice behind Howard and Brad Guzan. Hahnemann made his ninth and final appearance for the U.S. in 2011.

== Personal life ==
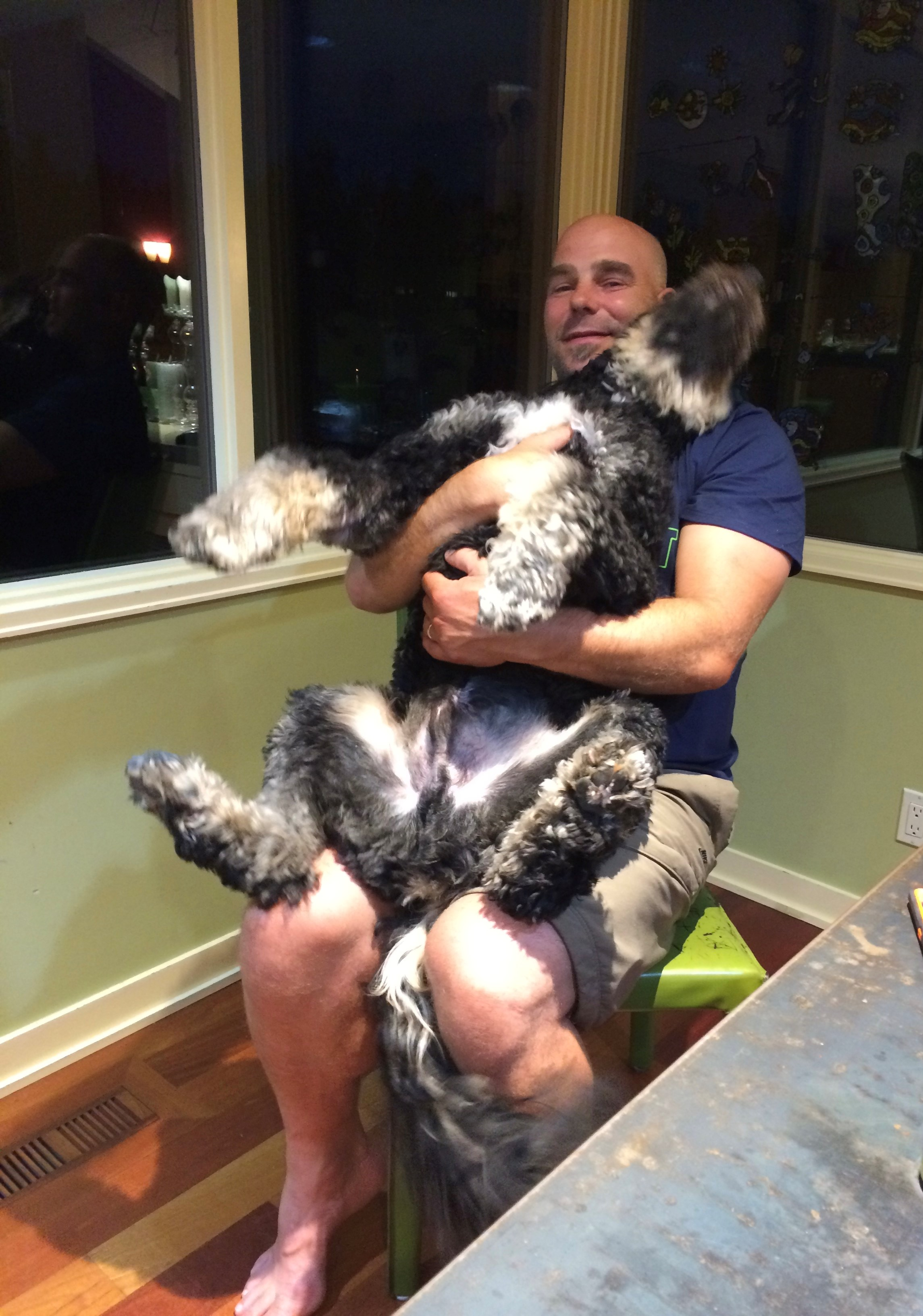
Hahnemann is a well-known animal lover.

Marcus Hahnemann is a Republican; his wife Amanda is a Democrat. He keeps hens, and also enjoys mountain biking and hunting. Before matches he listens to heavy metal to psych himself up, and presented Five Finger Death Punch with a Wolves shirt emblazoned with a Remembrance Day poppy. He collaborated with the Reading-based band Malefice in early 2012 to release a song which will debut on Jägermeister UK's Facebook page in February 2012. Hahnemann is of German descent, his parents come from Wentorf bei Hamburg.

Although he did not have defective vision, Hahnemann wore special contact lenses to reduce the glare of the sun when he played. At Reading, he gifted every match jersey to fans after games; he also cut his sleeves due to personal preference when the manufacturers no longer provided short sleeves.

In April 2016, Hahnemann and his former USMNT goalkeeper teammate Kasey Keller became coaches of the boys' soccer team at Newport High School, his former school in Bellevue, Washington.

== Career statistics ==
| Club performance | | | League | | Cup | | League Cup | | Continental | | Total | |
| Season | Club | League | Apps | Goals | Apps | Goals | Apps | Goals | Apps | Goals | Apps | Goals |
| United States | | | League | | Open Cup | | League Cup | | North America | | Total | |
|---|---|---|---|---|---|---|---|---|---|---|---|---|
| 1994 | Seattle Sounders | A-League | 14 | 0 | – | | – | | – | | 14 | 0 |
| 1995 | Seattle Sounders | A-League | 24 | 0 | – | | – | | – | | 24 | 0 |
| 1996 | Seattle Sounders | A-League | 27 | 0 | – | | – | | – | | 27 | 0 |
| 1997 | Colorado Rapids | Major League Soccer | 25 | 0 | – | | 5 | 0 | – | | 25 | 0 |
| 1998 | Colorado Rapids | Major League Soccer | 28 | 0 | – | | 2 | 0 | – | | 28 | 0 |
| 1999 | Colorado Rapids | Major League Soccer | 13 | 0 | – | | – | | – | | 13 | 0 |
| England | | | League | | FA Cup | | League Cup | | Europe | | Total | |
| 2000–01 | Fulham | First Division | 2 | 0 | – | | 2 | 0 | – | | 4 | 0 |
| 2001–02 | Rochdale | Third Division | 5 | 0 | – | | – | | – | | 5 | 0 |
| 2001–02 | Reading | Second Division | 6 | 0 | – | | – | | – | | 6 | 0 |
| 2002–03 | Reading | First Division | 41 | 0 | 2 | 0 | 1 | 0 | – | | 44 | 0 |
| 2003–04 | Reading | First Division | 36 | 0 | 2 | 0 | 4 | 0 | – | | 42 | 0 |
| 2004–05 | Reading | Championship | 46 | 0 | 3 | 0 | 2 | 0 | – | | 51 | 0 |
| 2005–06 | Reading | Championship | 45 | 0 | – | | 2 | 0 | – | | 47 | 0 |
| 2006–07 | Reading | Premier League | 38 | 0 | – | | – | | – | | 38 | 0 |
| 2007–08 | Reading | Premier League | 38 | 0 | – | | – | | – | | 38 | 0 |
| 2008–09 | Reading | Championship | 34 | 0 | – | | 1 | 0 | – | | 33 | 0 |
| 2009–10 | Wolves | Premier League | 25 | 0 | 0 | 0 | 2 | 0 | – | | 27 | 0 |
| 2010–11 | Wolves | Premier League | 14 | 0 | 0 | 0 | 0 | 0 | – | | 14 | 0 |
| 2011–12 | Everton | Premier League | 0 | 0 | 0 | 0 | 0 | 0 | – | | 0 | 0 |
| United States | | | League | | Open Cup | | League Cup | | North America | | Total | |
| 2012 | Seattle Sounders FC | Major League Soccer | – | | – | | – | | 1 | 0 | 1 | 0 |
| 2013 | Seattle Sounders FC | Major League Soccer | 1 | 0 | 1 | 0 | — | | 1 | 0 | 3 | 0 |
| Total | United States | | 132 | 0 | 1+ | 0 | – | | 1 | 0 | 135+ | 0 |
| Total | England | | 330 | 0 | 8+ | 0 | 14 | 0 | - | | 351 | 0 |
| Career total | | | 462 | 0 | 8+ | 0 | 14 | 0 | 1 | 0 | 486+ | 0 |

== Honors ==
Seattle Sounders

- League Championship: 1995, 1996

Reading

- Football League Championship: 2005–06

United States

- CONCACAF Gold Cup: 2005

Individual

- PFA Team of the Year: 2005–06 Football League Championship

== Bibliography ==
- Marcus Hahnemann's Premiership Diary (2007), Know the Score Books (ISBN 1-905449-33-X)
