= Bryan Meredith =

American professional soccer player (born 1989)

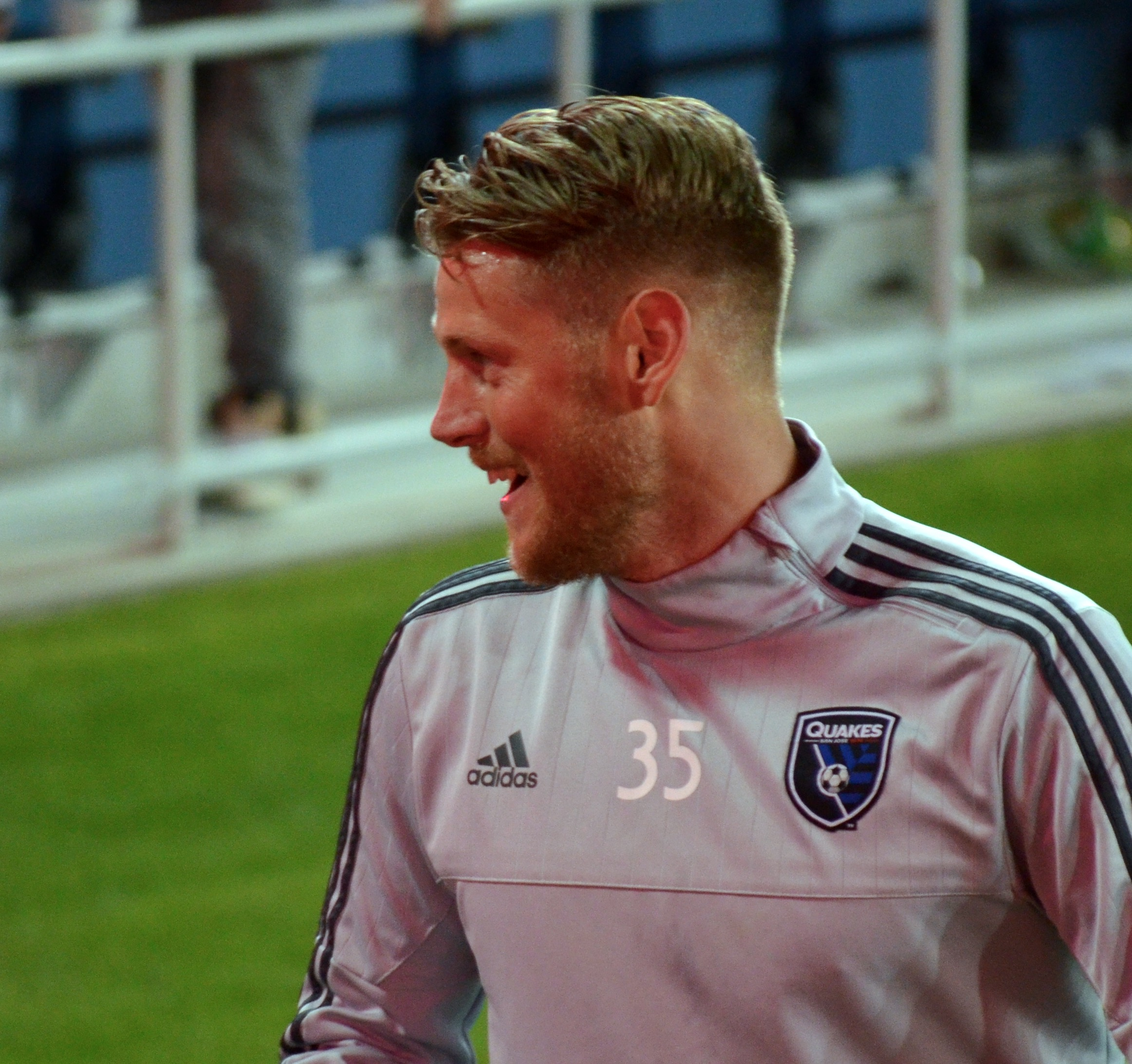
- Meredith in 2015

Personal information
- Full name: Bryan Meredith
- Date of birth: August 2, 1989 (age 37)
- Place of birth: Scotch Plains, New Jersey, U.S.
- Height: 1.88 m (6 ft 2 in)
- Position: Goalkeeper

College career
Years	Team	Apps	(Gls)
2007–2010	Monmouth Hawks	64	(0)

Senior career*
Years	Team	Apps	(Gls)
2010	Central Jersey Spartans	9	(0)
2011	Kitsap Pumas	14	(0)
2011–2012	Seattle Sounders FC	12	(0)
2013	IK Brage	3	(0)
2013	New York Cosmos	0	(0)
2014–2016	San Jose Earthquakes	0	(0)
2017–2019	Seattle Sounders FC	1	(0)
2017–2019	→ Tacoma Defiance (loan)	25	(0)
2020	Vancouver Whitecaps FC	3	(0)
2021–2022	Nashville SC	0	(0)
2022	→ Indy Eleven (loan)	3	(0)
- * Club domestic league appearances and goals as of October 17, 2022

Bryan Meredith (born August 2, 1989) is an American former professional soccer player who played as a goalkeeper, and current coach.

== Early life ==
Raised in Scotch Plains, New Jersey, Meredith attended top public program Scotch Plains-Fanwood High School and achieved the following honors: NSCAA/adidas All-America in 2006. Named NSCAA/adidas All-Region in 2005. Named first-team all-state goalkeeper in 2004, 2005 and 2006. Three-time all-state first-team by the Star Ledger. Star Ledger Union County Player of the Year in 2006. Holds high school record for shutouts (47).

=== Collegiate career ===
Meredith attended Monmouth University, where he was team captain. During his time at Monmouth, Meredith won awards such as NSCAA/adidas North Atlantic Region First Team, All-Northeast Conference Second Team and 2008 NSCAA/adidas NCAA Division I All-North Atlantic Region Third Team.

== Club career ==
=== Amateur ===
During his time at college, Meredith spent the 2010 season with Central Jersey Spartans of the USL Premier Development League.

=== Professional ===
On January 14, 2011, Meredith was selected in the second round (29th overall) of the 2011 MLS SuperDraft by Seattle Sounders FC. After a long trial with Seattle, he was released by the club after being beaten to third goalkeeping position by Josh Ford. Meredith signed with USL Premier Development League club Kitsap Pumas where he made 14 league appearances, before being signed again by the Sounders on September 12, 2011, after a season-ending injury to their backup goalkeeper Terry Boss. He made his competitive debut on October 18, 2011, in a 2–1 Sounders loss to Monterrey in the CONCACAF Champions League and his MLS debut as a second half sub for an injured Michael Gspurning in a 2–0 victory over the LA Galaxy. He made his first MLS start three days later with a 1–0 clean sheet against the Philadelphia Union. The Sounders declined to pick up a contract option on Meredith on December 14, 2012.

Swedish team IK Brage signed him to a two-year contract on December 21, 2012.

He was signed to play for the New York Cosmos in their first season in the North American Soccer League but failed to make an appearance. He was then signed by San Jose Earthquakes of Major League Soccer on January 24, 2014.

Meredith was selected by Seattle Sounders FC in the 2016 Re-Entry Draft Stage 1, following his option been declined by San Jose.

On November 19, 2019, Meredith was selected by expansion side Inter Miami CF in the 2019 MLS Expansion Draft. He was subsequently traded to Vancouver Whitecaps FC on January 29, 2020, in exchange for a 4th-round 2021 MLS SuperDraft pick. He was released by Vancouver on November 30, 2020.

On February 24, 2021, Meredith joined Nashville SC. Following the 2022 season, his contract option was declined by Nashville. On February 17, 2023, Meredith announced his retirement and his transition to becoming Goalkeepers coach for the Nashville SC academy.

== Style of play ==
Meredith's playing style was unique in that he played a combination of goalkeeper and midfield during the later part of his high school career due to an abnormally high ability on the ball for a goalie; he would frequently rush the length of the field to take free kicks and penalties.

== Honors ==
New York Cosmos

- Soccer Bowl: 2013

Seattle Sounders FC

- MLS Cup: 2019
- U.S. Open Cup: 2011
