= Adam Johansson =

Swedish football player (born 1983)

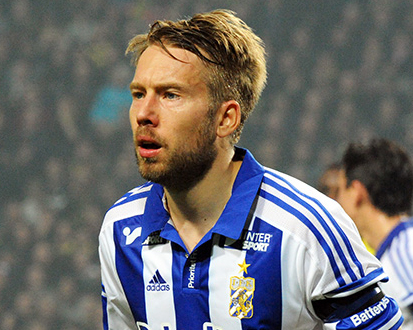

Personal information
- Full name: Adam Per Alexander Johansson
- Date of birth: 21 February 1983 (age 43)
- Place of birth: Gothenburg, Sweden
- Height: 1.82 m (6 ft 0 in)
- Position: Right back

Youth career
- Slottsskogen/Godhem IF
- –2000: Kungsladugårds BK

Senior career*
Years	Team	Apps	(Gls)
2000–2001	Kungsladugårds BK		
2002–2004	Västra Frölunda IF	66	(1)
2005–2011	IFK Göteborg	129	(1)
2012–2013	Seattle Sounders FC	21	(0)
2013–2016	IFK Göteborg	45	(0)
Total		261	(2)

International career
2002–2005	Sweden U21	13	(0)
2009–2013	Sweden	18	(0)
- * Club domestic league appearances and goals

Adam Johansson (born 21 February 1983) is a Swedish former professional footballer who played as a defender. Born in Gothenburg, Johansson played for Västra Frölunda IF in the Superettan before moving IFK Göteborg in the Allsvenskan in 2005. With Göteborg, he won the Allsvenskan in 2007 and the Swedish Cup in 2008, before he signed with Seattle Sounders FC. He also has played for the Sweden national team in 18 appearances, including 2010 World Cup qualifying and 2014 World Cup qualifying.

== Club career ==
=== IFK Göteborg ===
After playing for two local clubs and Västra Frölunda IF, he joined IFK Göteborg in 2005. After initially not featuring regularly, he firmly established himself as the club's first-choice right back, starting at that position in 24 out of 26 Allsvenskan matches in 2007 as the club won the Allsvenskan title. During the 2009 season Johansson also started games at left back. In December 2010, he was targeted by English club Sunderland and Italian club Fiorentina for transfer, but stayed with Göteborg.

=== Seattle Sounders ===
Johansson signed with Major League Soccer club Seattle Sounders FC on 29 December 2011 to replace James Riley at right back. He contacted Swedish personnel in MLS, including New York Red Bulls coach Hans Backe and former Sounders midfielder Erik Friberg, about the league prior to signing, and joined the team in Arizona for training in January 2012. The Swedish defender made his Seattle debut during 2–1 win over Santos Laguna in a CONCACAF Champions League quarterfinal fixture on 8 March 2012. He made his MLS league debut on 17 March in a 3–1 win against Toronto at CenturyLink Field. He didn't regularly start games until July due to a hamstring injury, when he provided 2 assists in a 2–2 draw against the New York Red Bulls. Johansson didn't play in any of the Sounders' U.S. Open Cup matches, and played one minute of the 2012–13 Champions League at the end of a 3–1 win over Caledonia AIA in August. Johansson played all 4 games in the MLS Cup playoffs, conceding a penalty against the Los Angeles Galaxy for a handball on Robbie Keane in a 2–1 win in the Conference Final, which the Sounders lost 4–2 on aggregate. Johansson was waived by Seattle on 19 March 2013.

== International career ==
Johansson previously played in the Swedish national under-21 team for 3 years before making his senior debut as left back on 24 January 2009 in a 3–2 loss to United States at the Home Depot Center, tripping Marvell Wynne to concede a penalty in the 40th minute. He played his first World Cup qualifier in a scoreless draw against Portugal on 28 March 2009 in Porto. Johansson went on to play two more qualifiers in June, a 1–0 loss to Denmark and a 4–0 win over Malta, as Sweden failed to qualify for the 2010 FIFA World Cup.

Johansson was not called up to the national team in 2010 for friendlies or Euro 2012 qualifying, but he started a 2–1 win over Botswana on 19 January 2011, and was an unused substitute in a 1–1 draw with the South African development team 2 days later. The Swedish defender also played a full match in a 2–0 win over Cyprus on 8 February, but did not play in a 1–1 draw and subsequent penalty shootout loss against Ukraine. Johansson was not selected to play in Euro 2012 qualifying in 2011 and did not play until 2012, where he started in a 2–0 friendly win over Bahrain and came on as a halftime substitute in a 5–0 win over the Qatari under-23 team in January. He was not called up to Sweden's squad for Euro 2012, where they finished last in their group. Johansson came on in the 20th minute as a substitute for the injured Mikael Lustig during a 1–0 friendly win over China on 6 September. During September and October, he was an unused substitute in three 2014 World Cup qualifiers: a 2–0 win over Kazakhstan, a 2–1 win over Faroe Islands, and a 4–4 draw with Germany. Johansson was called up to appear in the 2013 King's Cup in Thailand and played in a 1–1 semifinal draw with North Korea, as won on penalties, and the 3–0 win over Finland in the final on 26 January. He played 30 minutes in a friendly against Argentina in February 2013.

== Personal life ==
Adam Johansson studied political science, economics, history, and international relations at the University of Gothenburg in Sweden before beginning his professional soccer career. He enjoys Swedish rock musician Joakim Thåström and watching Swedish game show På spåret (On Track).

== Career statistics ==
=== Club ===
As of 19 August 2015

Club	Season	League		Cup		Continental		Total	
Club	Season	Apps	Goals	Apps	Goals	Apps	Goals	Apps	Goals
Västra Frölunda IF	2002	29	1	0	0	—		29	1
Västra Frölunda IF	2003	13	0	0	0	—		13	0
Västra Frölunda IF	2004	24	0	0	0	—		24	0
Västra Frölunda IF	Total	66	1	0	0	0	0	66	1
IFK Göteborg	2005	13	0	3	0	3	0	19	0
IFK Göteborg	2006	18	0	1	0	2	0	21	0
IFK Göteborg	2007	24	0	4	0	—		28	0
IFK Göteborg	2008	19	0	4	0	4	1	27	1
IFK Göteborg	2009	13	0	1	0	0	0	14	0
IFK Göteborg	2010	27	1	2	0	2	0	31	1
IFK Göteborg	2011	15	0	1	0	—		16	0
IFK Göteborg	Total	129	1	16	0	11	1	156	2
Seattle Sounders FC	2012	21	0	0	0	3	0	24	0
Seattle Sounders FC	Total	21	0	0	0	3	0	24	0
IFK Göteborg	2013	27	0	2	0	2	0	31	0
IFK Göteborg	2014	16	0	3	0	6	0	25	0
IFK Göteborg	2015	1	0	1	0	0	0	2	0
IFK Göteborg	Total	44	0	6	0	8	0	58	0
Career total		260	2	22	0	22	1	304	3

=== International ===
As of 10 September 2013

National team	Year	Apps	Goals
Sweden	2009	7	0
Sweden	2010	0	0
Sweden	2011	2	0
Sweden	2012	3	0
Sweden	2013	6	0
Total		18	0

== Honours ==
IFK Göteborg

- Allsvenskan: 2007
- Svenska Cupen: 2008, 2012–13, 2014–15
