= 2009 Seattle Sounders FC season =

American soccer team season

Seattle Sounders FC
2009 season
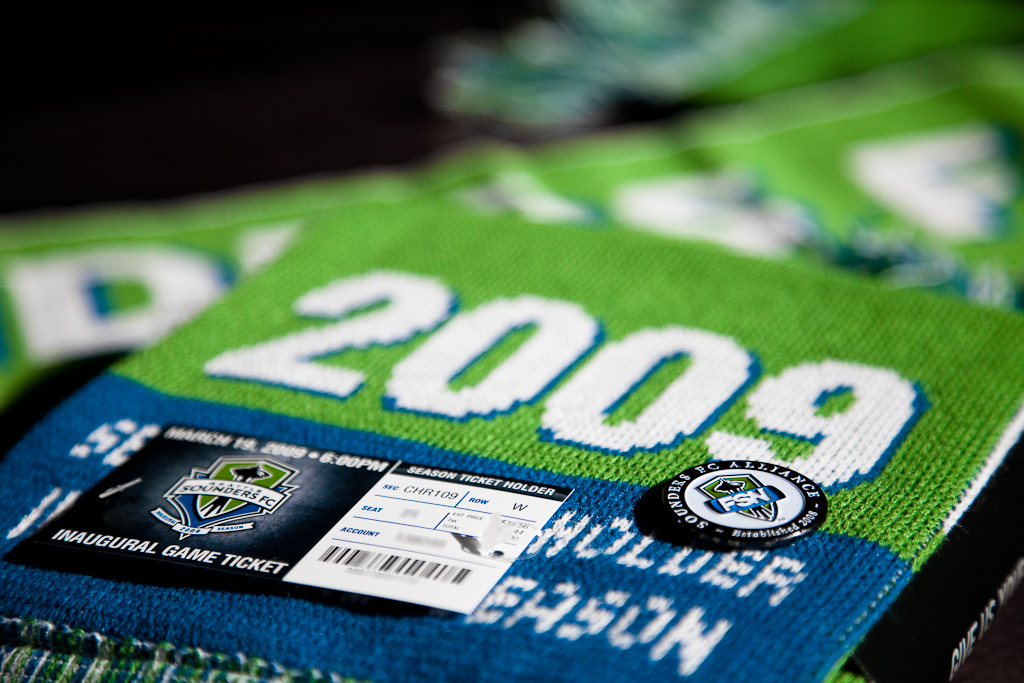
- Match ticket for the Sounders' first game in Major League Soccer
- General manager: Adrian Hanauer
- Head coach: Sigi Schmid
- Stadium: Qwest Field
- Major League Soccer: Conference: 3rd Overall: 4th
- MLS Cup playoffs: Conference semifinals
- U.S. Open Cup: Winners
- Top goalscorer: League: Fredy Montero (12); All: Fredy Montero (13)
- Highest home attendance: All: 66,848 (Aug. 5 vs Barcelona); League: 33,108 (Oct. 24 vs. Dallas); Playoffs: 35,807 (Oct. 29 vs. Houston)
- Lowest home attendance: 28,548 (Mar. 28 vs. Salt Lake)
- Average home league attendance: 30,943
- Biggest win: League: 3–0 vs. New York RB (Mar. 19)
- Biggest defeat: League: 0–4 at San Jose (Aug. 2)
| Home colors | Away colors |

The 2009 season was Seattle Sounders FC's first in Major League Soccer (MLS), the top flight of American soccer. It was the 29th season played by a professional team bearing the Sounders name, which was chosen for the MLS expansion team by a fan vote. An MLS franchise was awarded to a group from Seattle in 2007, including Adrian Hanauer, the owner of the second-division incarnation of the Sounders.

The Sounders hired head coach Sigi Schmid, who had won the MLS Cup with the Columbus Crew in 2008, and retained Hanauer as general manager. The club made their home debut on March 19, 2009, at Qwest Field against MLS Cup runners-up New York Red Bulls and won 3–0. During their inaugural season, the Sounders set MLS records for attendance, averaging 30,943 per match; the highest attendance of 66,848—a Washington state record for soccer—was recorded on August 5 during a friendly against FC Barcelona.

Seattle won the U.S. Open Cup, defeating D.C. United 2–1 in the final in Washington, D.C. The club finished third in the Western Conference and became the first MLS expansion team to qualify for the MLS Cup Playoffs since 1998. In the first round of the playoffs, they were defeated in the Conference Semifinals by the Houston Dynamo. Colombian forward Fredy Montero scored 12 goals and was the team's top goalscorer; four Sounders players were also named to the All-Star Game roster.

== Background ==
In a press conference on November 13, 2007, MLS awarded an expansion franchise to an ownership group based in Seattle. In 2008, Sounders FC developed the Starfire Sports Complex in Tukwila and the USL team played most of the 2008 season at the updated facility. At the time, the USL team's management thought that practicing and playing at Starfire could provide more continuity and a smoother transition for those hoping to play for the new MLS franchise.

In late 2008, Seattle Sounders FC interviewed several head coach candidates, including Columbus Crew manager Sigi Schmid, New England assistant Paul Mariner, and Kansas City technical director Peter Vermes. The club offered a contract to Schmid, who had led the Crew to an MLS Cup title that season, but the ownership of the Columbus Crew filed a tampering complaint with the MLS that put the offer on hold. The Crew's ownership complained that Schmid had communicated with Sounders FC during the 2008 season, despite being denied permission to do so, and that he shared confidential information with Sounders FC after leaving the Crew. The MLS ruled that no tampering occurred, but ordered Sounders FC to financially compensate the Crew before signing Schmid. Sounders FC officially introduced Schmid as their first coach on December 16. Former USL Sounders player and head coach Brian Schmetzer was retained as the top assistant coach, and Tom Dutra was selected as goalkeeper coach. Retired Major League Soccer veteran defender Ezra Hendrickson joined the Sounders as an assistant coach in January, 2009. Former MLS player and Everett, Washington, native Chris Henderson was named technical director on January 24, 2008. Joining Henderson in the front office is longtime Seattle Seahawks VP Gary Wright as the senior vice president of business operations. Drew Carey was named the chairman of the Membership Association.

=== Signings and drafts ===
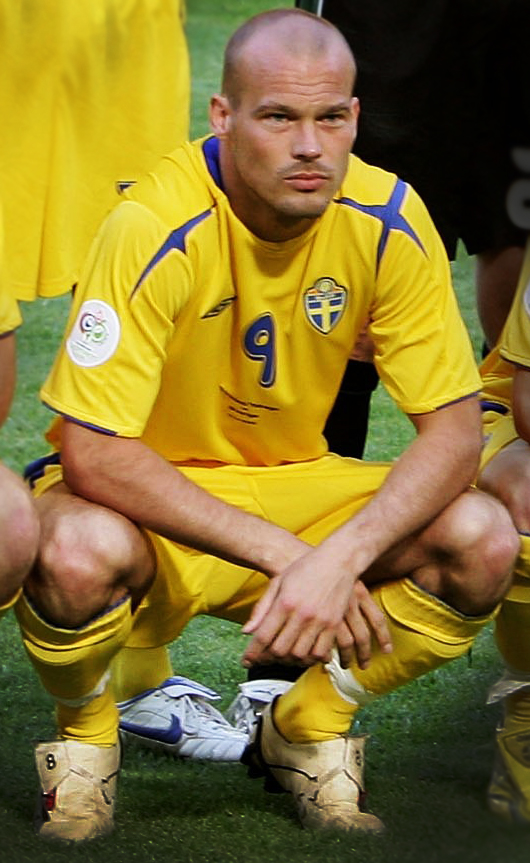
Swedish midfielder Freddie Ljungberg was signed as Sounders FC's first Designated Player.

Seattle Sounders FC was given first negotiation rights to any player that was not drafted in the 2008 MLS SuperDraft and joined the USL Sounders for the 2008 season. The team was also allowed to promote as many players from the 2008 USL Sounders squad as they'd chose, as long as the player's rights were not controlled by another team. Seattle Sounders FC officially announced the 2007 USL First Division MVP and former USL Sounder Sébastien Le Toux as its first signing on May 7, 2008. On August 14, 2008, the Sounders announced in a press conference their second signing for the 2009 season, former United States men's national team goalkeeper Kasey Keller, a Washington native. On September 5, 2008, Seattle Sounders FC announced the third signee for the franchise to be Sanna Nyassi from Gambia. Nyassi, a 19-year-old midfielder, was a member of the Gambia U-20 national team at the 2007 FIFA Championship. Sanna's twin brother, Sainey Nyassi, was signed by the Revolution and is a regular starter in MLS this season. On October 28, 2008, it was officially announced that the Sounders had signed Swedish midfielder Freddie Ljungberg using the Designated Player Rule. He signed a two-year contract reported to be worth $2.5 million per season.

Team building continued with the 2008 MLS Expansion Draft and the 2009 MLS SuperDraft. In the expansion draft, held on November 26, 2008, Seattle Sounders FC selected the following players from other MLS teams: Nate Jaqua (Houston), Brad Evans (Columbus), Stephen King (Chicago), Jeff Parke (RBNY), James Riley (San Jose), Khano Smith (New England), Jarrod Smith (Toronto FC), Nathan Sturgis (Real Salt Lake), Peter Vagenas (LA Galaxy) and Tyson Wahl (Kansas City). As the 2009 expansion team Sounders FC was given the first pick in each round of the SuperDraft. With the number one pick of the first round of the draft, Seattle Sounders FC selected University of Akron forward Steve Zakuani. As the first picks of the second round (16th overall), third round (31st overall), and fourth round (46th overall), Seattle selected Wake Forest University defender Evan Brown, Azusa Pacific University defender Jared Karkas, and Harvard University midfielder/forward Michael Fucito respectively.

The team lineup was adjusted throughout. Defender Jeff Parke was selected in the expansion draft, and reported for training camp after tryouts with teams in Belgium. After training with the club for less than a week, Parke was unable to reach a contract agreement and left to train with the Vancouver Whitecaps of the USL. FC traded a conditional draft pick to Houston in order to acquire defender Patrick Ianni, who had worked with Seattle's coach Schmid on the under-20 US national team. Seattle also traded allocation money to Toronto FC in exchange for Tyrone Marshall in order to increase their depth on defense. The Sounders also traded away midfielder Khano Smith, another expansion draft selection, to Red Bull New York for allocation money.

== Summary ==
=== Preseason ===
External videos
- 2009: A Storybook Season by Seattle Sounders FC (2020)

Seattle's preseason was broken up into four stages. The team started in southern California, then moved back to the Northwest, then to Argentina, and then finished back in Seattle. On February 9, 2009, in their first ever exhibition game, Sounders FC beat the Los Angeles Galaxy 3–1 on a practice field beside The Home Depot Center in Carson, California. Fredy Montero, Roger Levesque and Sanna Nyassi all scored goals in the win. The next day, Sounders FC had their second training match in Ventura, California against Chinese club Shandong Luneng. They won 2–0 with both goals provided by midfielder Sanna Nyassi. The following day, February 11, Sounders FC defeated the Ventura County Fusion of the USL Premier Development League 6–1 in their third preseason match in three days. Steve Zakuani and Nate Jaqua both scored two goals while Fredy Montero and Roger Levesque added one each. On February 14, Sounders FC experienced their first loss of the preseason falling 3–2 to the San Jose Earthquakes while playing on the campus of California Polytechnic State University in San Luis Obispo, California. Fredy Montero scored both of the Sounders FC goals in the loss.

Following their activities in southern California, Sounders FC's returned to the Pacific Northwest to continue their training. On the evening of February 20, 2009, Sounders FC defeated the University of Portland Pilots 4–1. Nate Jaqua and Kasey Keller received a pregame ovation because they both had played collegiate soccer with the Pilots. Jaqua, along with trialist Jeff Clark, Fredy Montero, and Brad Evans scored goals for Seattle. Two days later, the club played their first preseason match at Qwest Field as they defeated the Vancouver Whitecaps 4–0. Forwards Nate Jaqua and Fredy Montero scored two goals apiece.

Next the club traveled to Buenos Aires, Argentina where they continued training and played 4 more preseason matches. Seattle played the first of these matches against Estudiantes de La Plata on February 27, who they lost to 1–3. On February 28, Sounders FC had their first tie of the preseason, 1–1 against CED, a team made up of local free agent players. The club defeated Argentine second division opponents Tristán Suárez 5–0. Michael Fucito, Fredy Montero, Brad Evans and Zach Scott and Sebastian Le Toux all scored in the victory. One day later, due to heavy rain, an exhibition match against Gimnasia La Plata was canceled. In the club's final preseason match in Argentina, they faced reserve players of River Plate on March 5. They were held scoreless by River Plate with a final score of 1–0.

After completing training exercises in Argentina, the club returned to Seattle for the remainder of the preseason. On March 9, Designated Player Freddie Ljungberg joined practice for the first time. Ljungberg had missed most of the preseason due to hip surgery he had undergone in December. On March 12, Sounders FC played their final preseason match against the Colorado Rapids of the MLS at Qwest Field. Seattle lost 1–0 on a penalty kick by Colorado's Conor Casey. Seattle finished their preseason with a record of 7 wins, 3 losses, and 1 tie.

=== March ===
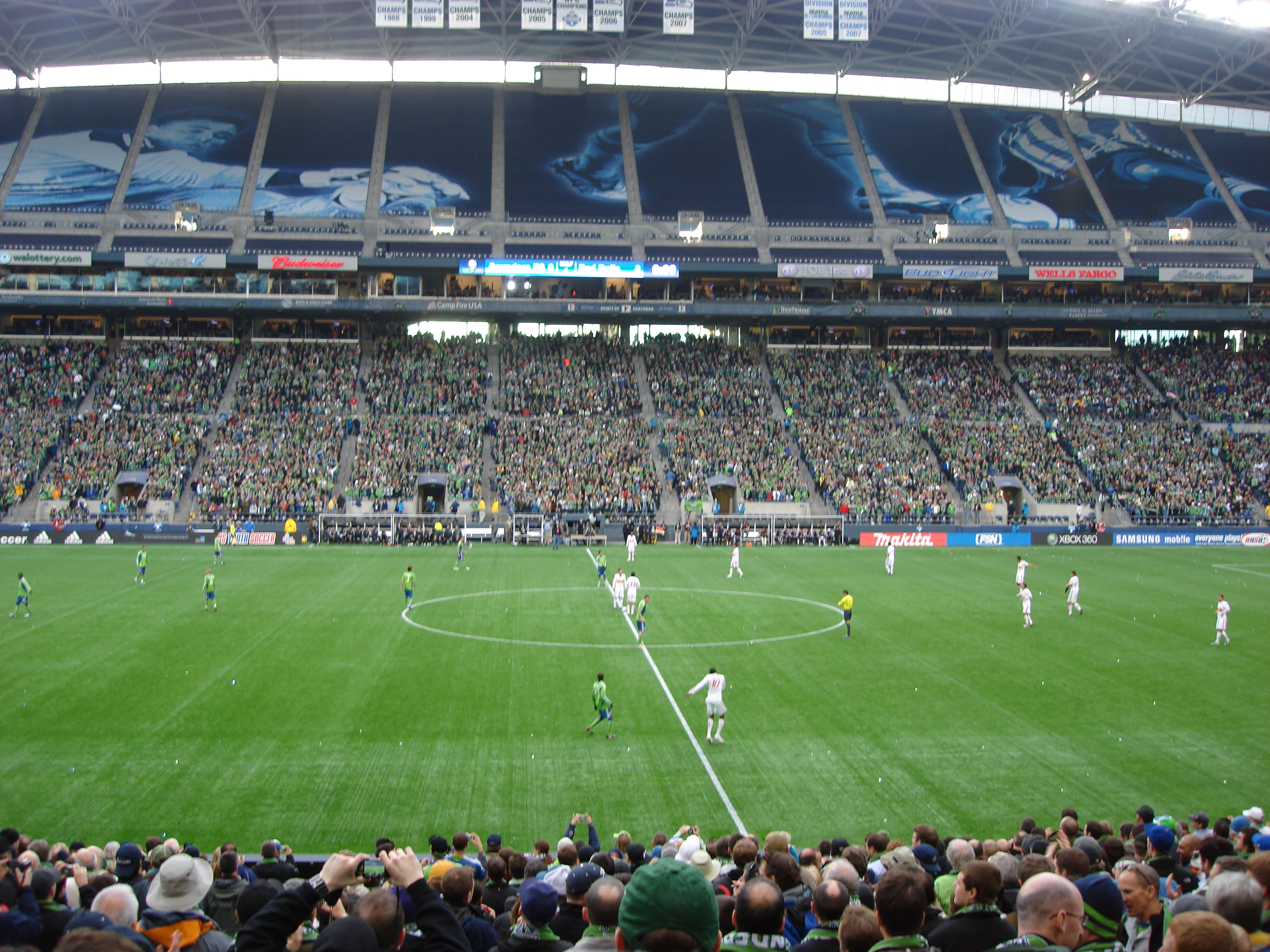
Red Bull New York kick-off to start the 2009 MLS season against Seattle

Prior to the first game of the season, all 22,000 season ticket packages offered by the team were sold, giving the team the most season ticket holders in Major League Soccer. On March 19, Seattle Sounders FC began their first regular season with a 3–0 win over the New York Red Bulls. Fredy Montero scored the first regular season goal in team history, finishing a movement from Sebastien Le Toux and Osvaldo Alonso in the 12th minute. Montero assisted Brad Evans' goal, and also scored the team's third goal. Kasey Keller, a veteran American goalkeeper who had played his entire career abroad, made his MLS debut at 39 years of age, and made two saves to register the team's first regular season shutout.

On March 24 Seattle signed Kevin Forrest as a Senior Developmental player after he was released by Colorado. On March 28 Sounders FC continued the success of their fast start with a second consecutive home shutout, defeating Real Salt Lake 2–0. Designated player Freddie Ljungberg made his first regular season appearance as a substitute in the 61st minute of play. Nate Jaqua scored in the 17th minute, and Fredy Montero scored his league leading third goal of the season in the 77th minute.

March saw Montero winning Player of the Week honors for week 1 and Keller for week 2. Montero won Goal of the Week for the first two games and was named the Player of the Month.

=== April ===
After their first two victories at home, Sounders FC played their first away game in history against Toronto FC. The Sounders expected a challenging away environment but were victorious were able to win in another 2–0 shutout. Montero missed the match due to illness. Soon after, reports out of Seattle linked Montero to a sexual assault case with an unidentified woman. In a statement made by Sounders publicist, Montero asserted that the allegations stemmed from a disagreement in which he sought to end the relationship. and a police inquiry resulted in no charges being filed.

After winning their first three games, Seattle Sounders FC suffered their first competitive loss at home against the Kansas City Wizards. Kasey Keller was sent off in the 29th minute for a handball outside the 18-yard box, as the Sounders fell 1–0 to the Wizards. The following week they lost at Chivas USA. Chris Eylander was scored on twice while covering the goal during Keller's suspension. The Sounders again failed to score.

The Sounders returned to their winning ways in a 2–0 home win against the San Jose Earthquakes.

April 28 was the beginning of the team's Open Cup campaign. Schmid asserted that the competition was important and won the first of two qualifying rounds 4–1 against Real Salt Lake. The Sounders have played home games at the Starfire Sports Complex in Tukwila. The facility is older and smaller than Qwest Field but the Sounders say the atmosphere is better for smaller cup matches.

=== May ===
The following 5 weeks the Sounders managed to gain 5 points in the standings as they tied each game. First, a 1–1 tie at the Chicago Fire in which striker Fredy Montero was sent off in the 48th minute for an elbow to the face of Gonzalo Segares while both players went up for a ball in the air. Then another 1–1 tie the next week at home against the Los Angeles Galaxy in which yet another red card was issued, to James Riley this time, in the 57th minute for a "phantom blow" to Mike Magee as the two got into a scrum. Two more away ties followed, first against FC Dallas 1–1 and then another at Colorado, 2–2. Ljungberg missed three games during this period due to migraine headaches. On May 31, Sounders FC then returned home for their fifth consecutive draw in league play, a 1–1 score against the Columbus Crew in which Tyrone Marshal was ejected in the 92nd minute when he threw what the referee believed was a punch at Steven Lenhart in retaliation for an elbow. The Sounders accumulated another three yellow cards throughout the match. Jaqua's goal received Goal of the Week honors.

On May 26, the Sounders qualified for the U.S. Open Cup by defeating the Colorado Rapids 1–0 at Starfire.

=== June ===
Seattle started June with a 1–0 loss at Chivas. Their penalty woes continued as Jhon Kennedy Hurtado accumulated his fifth yellow card and Nate Jaqua received two yellow cards resulting in them both being suspended for the next game. After the first 12 games of the season, Sounders FC were in 5th place overall and were tied for the league lead with 5 red card ejections and 6 disciplinary suspensions.

On June 13, in a rematch with San Jose, Sounders FC began a stretch where 4 of their next 5 games would be played in front of their home crowd at Qwest Field. The match was the first to be counted for the supporter sponsored Heritage Cup. Ljungberg and Montero both scored as the Sounders prevailed with a 2–1 victory.

On June 10 Lamar Neagle was signed as a Senior Developmental player on the official roster.

On June 17, the Sounders blew a 3–1 lead to tie against D.C. United by a score of 3–3. The match was the sixth draw in eight regular season matches. They drew again with a goal a piece at New York the following week.

In week 23, the Sounders defeated the Rapids who had been undefeated in the previous eight games. Jaqua set up the first goal by Montero. Jaqua then scored twice off of assists from Montero to end the game 3–0. Jaqua's performance earned Goal of the Week and Player of the Week.

=== July ===
On July 1, Sounders FC traveled to Portland and eliminated the Timbers of the USL in the third round of the U.S. Open Cup. The game was played in front of an emotionally charged sold-out crowd. Roger Levesque—a player Portland fans have had a particular dislike for – scored Seattle's first goal within the opening minute. The following week, in a quarterfinal match, Sounders FC defeated visiting Kansas City on a penalty kick in the 89th minute by Sebastien Le Toux.

It was announced in early July that the Sounders had signed left-footed Costa Rican defender Leonardo González to help at the left back position. The position had been a weak spot in Seattle's defense and filled by three separate players throughout the season.

On July 11, the Sounders hosted the Houston Dynamo at Qwest Field. Brian Schmetzer filled in for Schmid who was at his son's wedding. Ianni scored his first goal of the season on bicycle kick that would earn him the MLS goal of the Week. On the following Tuesday, the Sounders defeated the Dynamo at Starfire in the U.S. Open Cup semifinals. Houston led when Jaqua scored in the 89th minute. King scored a goal five minutes into extra time, thus sending the Sounders FC to the Open Cup finals against D.C. United.

On July 18, 2009, the Seattle Sounders lost 0–2 in a friendly game with Chelsea. All sections of the stadium were open and sold out with a crowd of 65,289 in attendance. The game was the first with the team for Chelsea's new manager, Carlo Ancelotti, and their new forward Daniel Sturridge.

Seattle finished July at home with a scoreless draw against Chicago. The Fire went a man down in the 54th minute but Ljungberg was ejected minutes later after protesting a yellow card for what the referee saw as diving in the penalty area.

Keller and Ljungberg were named to the 2009 MLS All-Star Game by votes from fans. Ljungberg lead the MLS in total votes. Hurtado and Montero were later selected for the game held on July 29. Ljungberg missed the final shot in the loss which was decided by penalty kicks. He was later hospitalized due to another migraine.

=== August ===
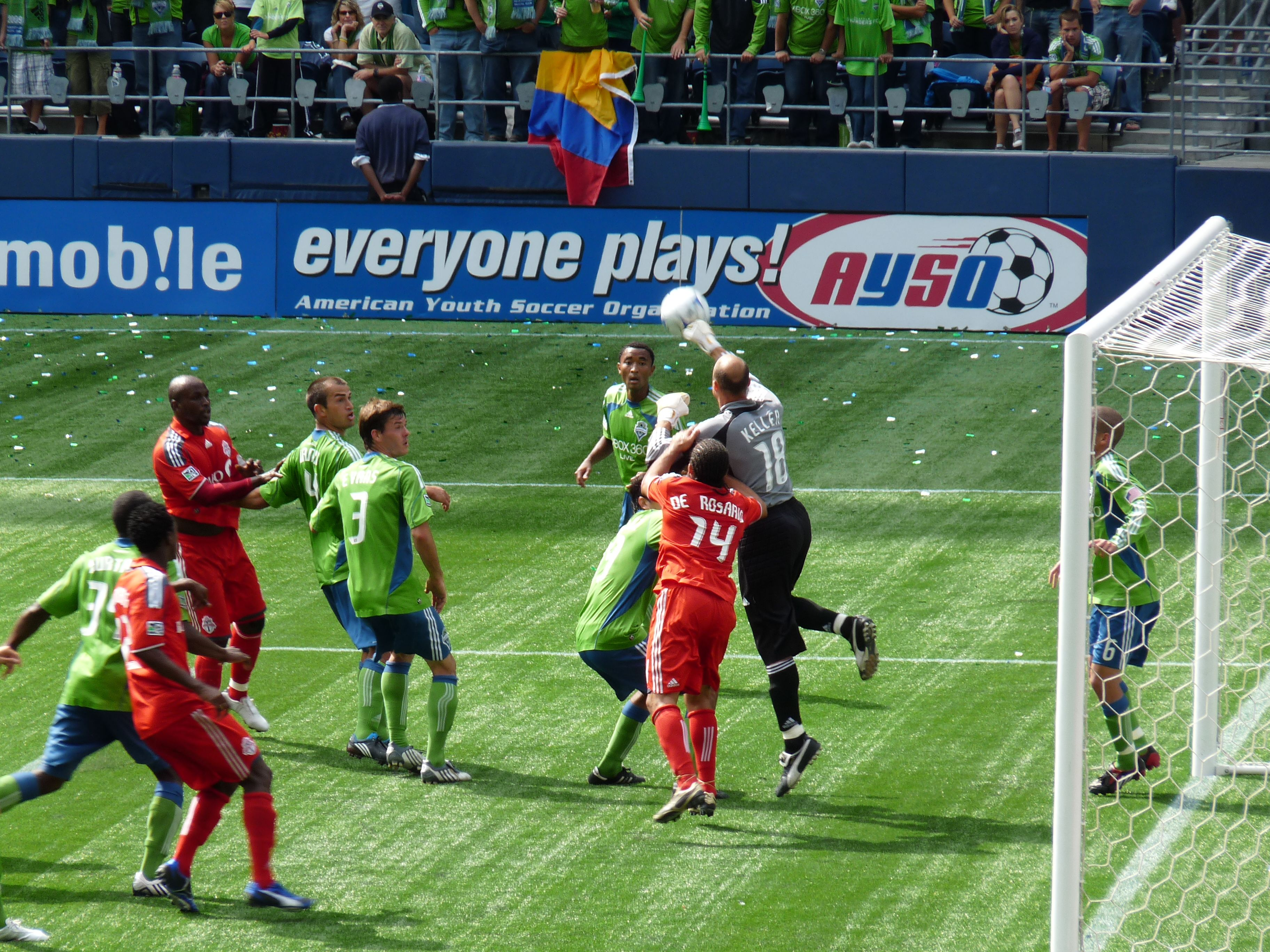
Kasey Keller making a save against Toronto FC

On August 2, the Sounders were shut out 4–0 by last-place San Jose. Riley received a red card in the 39th minute while the Earthquakes scored three times in the second half. Although Seattle had won the previous two matches, San Jose won the Heritage Cup by goal differential since the first game was not included in the supporter created competition.

In the second international friendly of the season the Sounders lost against FC Barcelona 0–4 on August 5. The attendance set the state's record for a soccer match at 66,848. Thierry Henry compared the crowd to those in Europe and called the fans "amazing". Schmid expressed his hope that the fans were not disappointed by the loss and said "I hope they realize they got to watch a great team".

On August 8, Sounders FC received their third straight shutout in regular season play in a 1–0 loss at Salt Lake. Schmidt called it "a silly loss".

At Los Angeles on August 15, Seattle won for the first time on the road since April 4. Along with the Marshall, the match saw the Galaxy's Beckham and Lewis ejected in a two-goal shutout. Zakuani won Goal of the Week for his goal made after a run into the box and cross from Evans.

Seattle lost at New England 1–0. Ljungberg did not travel with the team due to what would be diagnosed as hypoglycemia.

=== September ===
When D.C. United won the US Soccer bidding process to host the tournament's final match, Sounders FC general manager Adrian Hanauer expressed skepticism that D.C.'s bid to host the final had been better than the Seattle bid. He further noted that if Seattle had hosted the match, it likely would have sold out. This prompted a pointed reply from D.C. United president Kevin Payne in which he argued that D.C. United had won the bidding process fairly and that he was offended by Hanauer's comments. On the heels of this public disagreement, D.C. United launched a marketing campaign to sell more tickets to the match which included a web site heralding the club's history of titles as an original MLS franchise, WeWinTrophies.com; an open letter placed in local newspapers declaring that D.C. fans set the standard for support in the league and that Sounders FC and its fans did not think D.C. deserved to host; videos on the team's official blog from local celebrities urging fans to attend and ticket and concession specials for the game. On September 2, 2009, the U.S. Open Cup final was played in Washington D.C.'s RFK Stadium. Sounders FC prevailed 2–1 becoming the second MLS expansion team in league history (Chicago being the first) to win the Cup in their inaugural MLS season.

== Significance ==
Sounders FC recorded the highest average attendance during the 2009 season (regular and overall).

- League attendance record
- Fan culture and demographics
- Economic impact
- Leiweke recognized for successful expansion launch in a recession
- State Senate resolution

== Match results ==
Win Tie Loss

=== Preseason ===
| February 9, 2009 | Los Angeles Galaxy | 1–3 | Seattle Sounders FC | Carson, California |
| 15:00 PST | Lewis 2' | Report | Montero 28' (pen.); Levesque 84'; Nyassi 90' | Stadium: The Home Depot Center |

| February 10, 2009 | Shandong Luneng | 0–2 | Seattle Sounders FC | Ventura, California |
| 16:00 PST | | Report | Nyassi 56', 75' | Stadium: Ventura College |

| February 11, 2009 | Ventura County Fusion | 1–6 | Seattle Sounders FC | Ventura, California |
| 19:00 PST | Aghasyan 13' | Report | Montero 7'; Zakuani 9', 21'; Jaqua 43', 44'; Levesque 83' | Stadium: Ventura College |

| February 13, 2009 | San Jose Earthquakes | 3–2 | Seattle Sounders FC | San Luis Obispo, California |
| 19:00 PST | Johnson 7', 22'; Amarikwa 46' | Report | Montero 11', 44' | Stadium: Alex G. Spanos Stadium |

| February 20, 2009 | Portland Pilots | 1–4 | Seattle Sounders FC | Portland, Oregon |
| 19:00 PST | Emory 61' | Report | Jaqua 4'; Ianni 32'; Montero 70' (pen.); Evans 75' | Stadium: Merlo Field |

| February 22, 2009 | Seattle Sounders FC | 4–0 | Vancouver Whitecaps | Seattle, Washington |
| 12:00 PST | Jaqua 37', 39'; Montero 66', 67' | Report | | Stadium: Qwest Field; Attendance: None (closed to the public) |

| February 27, 2009 | Estudiantes de La Plata | 1–3 | Seattle Sounders FC | Buenos Aires, Argentina |
| 11:00 UTC-2 | Marshall 20' (o.g.) | Report | Jaqua 46'; Montero 54', 58' |

| February 28, 2009 | CED Rosario | 1–1 | Seattle Sounders FC | Buenos Aires, Argentina |
| 16:00 UTC-2 | CED No. 11 53' (pen.) | Report | Ferrerya 43' |

| March 3, 2009 | Tristán Suárez | 0–5 | Seattle Sounders FC | Buenos Aires, Argentina |
| 10:30 UTC-2 | | Report | Fucito 25'; Montero 33'; Evans 38'; Scott 43'; Le Toux 89' |

| March 5, 2009 | River Plate | 1–0 | Seattle Sounders FC | Buenos Aires, Argentina |
| 9:30 UTC-2 | Lizio 89' | Report |

| March 12, 2009 | Seattle Sounders FC | 0–1 | Colorado Rapids | Seattle, Washington |
| 19:00 PDT | | Report | Casey 38' (pen.) | Stadium: Qwest Field; Attendance: None (closed to the public) |

=== MLS regular season ===
| March 19, 2009 | Seattle Sounders FC | 3–0 | New York Red Bulls | Seattle, Washington |
| 18:00 PDT | Montero 12' 75'; Alonso (yellow card) 13'; Evans 25'; Hurtado (yellow card) 32'; Nyassi (yellow card) 67' | Report | Goldthwaite (yellow card) 21' | Stadium: Qwest Field; Attendance: 32,523; Referee: Jair Marrufo |

| March 28, 2009 | Seattle Sounders FC | 2–0 | Real Salt Lake | Seattle, Washington |
| 19:30 PDT | Jaqua 17'; Alonso (yellow card) 21'; Montero 77' | Report | Beckerman (yellow card) 10'; Morales (yellow card) 22'; Olave (yellow card) 45' | Stadium: Qwest Field; Attendance: 28,548; Referee: Baldomero Toledo |

| April 4, 2009 | Toronto FC | 0–2 | Seattle Sounders FC | Toronto, Ontario Canada |
| 15:00 EDT | Brennan (yellow card) 44'; Cronin (yellow card) 51' | Report | Ljungberg 15'; Hurtado (yellow card) 29'; Zakuani 45'; Riley (yellow card) 61'; Scott (yellow card) 86' | Stadium: BMO Field; Attendance: 20,658; Referee: Mark Geiger |

| April 11, 2009 | Seattle Sounders FC | 0–1 | Kansas City Wizards | Seattle, Washington |
| 19:30 PDT | Evans (yellow card) 4'; Keller (red card) 29' | Report | Jewsbury (yellow card) 4'; Kraus (yellow card) 71'; Arnaud 80'; Hartman (yellow card) 91' | Stadium: Qwest Field; Attendance: 28,746; Referee: Abiodun Okulaja |

| April 18, 2009 | Chivas USA | 2–0 | Seattle Sounders FC | Carson, California |
| 19:30 PDT | Lillingston (yellow card) 20'; Riley 32' (o.g.); Chijindu 84'; Trujillo (yellow card) 86' | Report | Scott (yellow card) 45'; Montero (yellow card) 47' | Stadium: The Home Depot Center; Attendance: 15,463; Referee: Alex Prus |

| April 25, 2009 | Seattle Sounders FC | 2–0 | San Jose Earthquakes | Seattle, Washington |
| 19:30 PDT | Alonso (yellow card) 30'; Zakuani 42'; Evans 50' | Report | Convey (yellow card) 4'; Garcia (yellow card) 41' | Stadium: Qwest Field; Attendance: 28,838; Referee: Kevin Stott |

| May 2, 2009 | Chicago Fire | 1–1 | Seattle Sounders FC | Bridgeview, Illinois |
| 19:30 CDT | Soumare (yellow card) 55'; Pappa 68'; Rolfe (yellow card) 95+' | Report | Marshall (yellow card) 1' (goal) 74'; Montero (red card) 48'; Riley (yellow card) 95+' | Stadium: Toyota Park; Attendance: 10,288; Referee: Jasen Anno |

| May 10, 2009 | Seattle Sounders FC | 1–1 | Los Angeles Galaxy | Seattle, Washington |
| 12:00 PDT | Le Toux 22'; Evans (yellow card) 45'; Riley (yellow card) 57' (red card) 57'; Ljungberg (yellow card) 58'; Jaqua (yellow card) 80' | Report | Gordon (yellow card) 32' (goal) 35'; Magee (yellow card) 59'; Sanneh (yellow card) 61'; Miglioranzi (yellow card) 83' | Stadium: Qwest Field; Attendance: 29,025; Referee: Tim Weyland |

| May 16, 2009 | FC Dallas | 1–1 | Seattle Sounders FC | Frisco, Texas |
| 19:30 CDT | Rocha (yellow card) 20' (goal) 48+'; Saragosa (yellow card) 75'; Guarda (yellow card) 80' | Report | Hurtado 18'; Zakuani (yellow card) 48+'; Marshall (yellow card) 64' | Stadium: Pizza Hut Park; Attendance: 8,247; Referee: Terry Vaughn |

| May 23, 2009 | Colorado Rapids | 2–2 | Seattle Sounders FC | Commerce City, Colorado |
| 19:30 MDT | Clark 26'; Casey 47'; Ihemelu (yellow card) 67' | Report | Montero 17'; Jaqua (yellow card) 28' (goal) 76'; Hurtado (yellow card) 57'; Vagenas (yellow card) 61' | Stadium: Dick's Sporting Goods Park; Attendance: 16,528; Referee: Hilario Grajeda |

| May 30, 2009 | Seattle Sounders FC | 1–1 | Columbus Crew | Seattle, Washington |
| 19:30 PDT | Vagenas (yellow card) 37'; Jaqua 58'; Hurtado (yellow card) 68'; Ljungberg (yellow card) 89'; Marshall (red card) 92+' | Report | Moreno 12'; Schelotto (yellow card) 73' | Stadium: Qwest Field; Attendance: 29,126; Referee: Michael Kennedy |

| June 6, 2009 | Chivas USA | 1–0 | Seattle Sounders FC | Carson, California |
| 19:30 PDT | Lillingston (yellow card) 26' (goal) 38'; Trujillo (yellow card) 90' | Report | Ianni (yellow card) 48'; Jaqua (yellow card) 54' (yellow-red card) 88'; Hurtado (yellow card) 81' | Stadium: The Home Depot Center; Attendance: 13,117; Referee: Kevin Stott |

| June 13, 2009 | Seattle Sounders FC | 2–1 | San Jose Earthquakes | Seattle, Washington |
| 19:30 PDT | Ljungberg 42' (yellow card) 94+'; Evans (yellow card) 43'; Montero 59' (yellow card) 74' | Report | Pitchkolan (yellow card) 16'; Corrales (yellow card) 34'; Ribeiro (yellow card) 50'; Huckerby 68'; Wondolowski (yellow card) 92+' | Stadium: Qwest Field; Attendance: 28,999; Referee: Silviu Petrescu |

| June 17, 2009 | Seattle Sounders FC | 3–3 | D.C. United | Seattle, Washington |
| 19:30 PDT | Alonso 38'; Burch 45' (o.g.); Montero 57' | Report | Pontius 34'; Gomez 63'; Jakovic (yellow card) 84'; Marshall 87' (o.g.); Namoff (yellow card) 92+' | Stadium: Qwest Field; Attendance: 29,104; Referee: Ricardo Salazar |

| June 20, 2009 | New York Red Bulls | 1–1 | Seattle Sounders FC | East Rutherford, New Jersey |
| 19:30 EDT | Kandji (yellow card) 11'; Goldthwaite (yellow card) 36'; Angel 40' | Report | Montero 48+'; Marshall (yellow card) 83' | Stadium: Giants Stadium; Attendance: 14,313; Referee: Paul Ward |

| June 28, 2009 | Seattle Sounders FC | 3–0 | Colorado Rapids | Seattle, Washington |
| 13:00 PDT | Ljungberg (yellow card) 19'; Montero 23'; Jaqua 48' 68'; Evans (yellow card) 71' | Report | Ihemelu (yellow card) 17'; Mastroeni (yellow card) 29'; Palguta (yellow card) 41' | Stadium: Qwest Field; Attendance: 32,526; Referee: Alex Prus |

| July 11, 2009 | Seattle Sounders FC | 2–1 | Houston Dynamo | Seattle, Washington |
| 13:00 PDT | Montero 32'; Hurtado (yellow card) 43'; Ianni 46'; Vagenas (yellow card) 64'; Wahl (yellow card) 66' | Report | Davis 12'; Waibel (yellow card) 71'; Kamara (yellow card) 90' | Stadium: Qwest Field; Attendance: 32,404; Referee: Mark Geiger |

| July 25, 2009 | Seattle Sounders FC | 0–0 | Chicago Fire | Seattle, Washington |
| 12:00 PDT | Hurtado (yellow card) 28'; Ianni (yellow card) 57'; Ljungberg (yellow card) 59' (yellow-red card) 59' | Report | Segares (yellow card) 39'; Thorrington (yellow card) 40' (yellow-red card) 54' | Stadium: Qwest Field; Attendance: 32,405; Referee: Baldomero Toledo |

| August 2, 2009 | San Jose Earthquakes | 4–0 | Seattle Sounders FC | Santa Clara, California |
| 12:00 PDT | Alonso 2' (o.g.); Hernandez (yellow card) 27'; Huckerby (yellow card) 37' (goal) 78'; Glen 54'; Wondolowski 84' (yellow card) 85' | Report | Ianni (yellow card) 22'; Riley (red card) 33'; Montero (yellow card) 35' | Stadium: Buck Shaw Stadium; Attendance: 9,919; Referee: Paul Ward |

| August 8, 2009 | Real Salt Lake | 1–0 | Seattle Sounders FC | Sandy, Utah |
| 19:00 MDT | Mathis (yellow card) 11'; Findley 62'; Beckerman (yellow card) 65' | Report | Hurtado (yellow card) 76' | Stadium: Rio Tinto Stadium; Attendance: 14,193; Referee: Kevin Stott |

| August 15, 2009 | Los Angeles Galaxy | 0–2 | Seattle Sounders FC | Carson, California |
| 20:00 PDT | DeLaGarza (yellow card) 14'; Beckham (red card) 17'; Lewis (red card) 79'; Kirovski (yellow card) 94+' | Report | Zakuani 22'; Montero 54' (yellow card) 81'; Marshall (yellow card) 65' (yellow-red card) 76' | Stadium: The Home Depot Center; Attendance: 20,162; Referee: Ricardo Salazar |

| August 20, 2009 | Seattle Sounders FC | 0–1 | New England Revolution | Seattle, Washington |
| 19:00 PDT | Gonzalez (yellow card) 40'; Montero (yellow card) 54'; Nyassi (yellow card) 86' | Report | Joseph 21'; Ralston (yellow card) 43'; Jankauskas (yellow card) 47+'; Heaps (yellow card) 49+'; Reis (yellow card) 65' | Stadium: Qwest Field; Attendance: 32,705; Referee: Baldomero Toledo |

| August 23, 2009 | Houston Dynamo | 1–1 | Seattle Sounders FC | Houston, Texas |
| 19:30 CDT | Boswell (yellow card) 19'; Cameron 36' | Report | Levesque (yellow card) 13'; Jaqua 70' | Stadium: Robertson Stadium; Attendance: 17,063; Referee: Alex Prus |

| August 29, 2009 | Seattle Sounders FC | 0–0 | Toronto FC | Seattle, Washington |
| 13:00 PDT | Ljungberg (yellow card) 73' | Report | Attakora (yellow card) 41'; Gomez (yellow card) 67'; De Rosario (yellow card) 67' | Stadium: Qwest Field; Attendance: 32,679; Referee: Jorge Gonzalez |

| September 12, 2009 | D.C. United | 1–2 | Seattle Sounders FC | Washington, D.C. USA |
| 19:30 EDT | Wallace 54' (yellow card) 57'; Quaranta (yellow card) 62'; John (yellow card) 93+' | Report | Zakuani 5'; Montero 84' | Stadium: RFK Memorial Stadium; Attendance: 19,592; Referee: Silviu Petrescu |

| September 19, 2009 | Seattle Sounders FC | 0–0 | Chivas USA | Seattle, Washington |
| 12:00 PDT | Alonso (yellow card) 40'; Marshall (yellow card) 78'; Jaqua (yellow card) 86' | Report | Jazic (yellow card) 34'; Nagamura (yellow card) 43'; Saragosa (red card) 71'; Trujillo (yellow card) 76'; Santos (yellow card) 77' | Stadium: Qwest Field; Attendance: 32,719; Referee: Terry Vaughn |

| September 26, 2009 | New England Revolution | 2–1 | Seattle Sounders FC | Foxborough, Massachusetts |
| 19:30 EDT | Joseph 51' (pen.) 87' | Report | Montero 5'; Jaqua (yellow card) 92+' | Stadium: Gillette Stadium; Attendance: 15,961; Referee: Steven DePiero |

| October 3, 2009 | Columbus Crew | 0–1 | Seattle Sounders FC | Columbus, Ohio |
| 19:30 EDT | Moreno (yellow card) 55'; O'Rourke (yellow card) 65'; Lenhart (yellow card) 95+' | Report | Levesque 36'; Marshall (yellow card) 84' | Stadium: Columbus Crew Stadium; Attendance: 14,372; Referee: Ricardo Salazar |

| October 17, 2009 | Kansas City Wizards | 2–3 | Seattle Sounders FC | Kansas City, Kansas |
| 19:30 CDT | Hercegfalvi 51'; Wolff 53' | Report | Marshall 27'; Vagenas (yellow card) 45'; Levesque 69'; Jaqua 76' | Stadium: CommunityAmerica Ballpark; Attendance: 10,135; Referee: Mark Geiger |

| October 24, 2009 | Seattle Sounders FC | 2–1 | FC Dallas | Seattle, Washington |
| 19:30 PDT | Alonso (yellow card) 57'; Evans (yellow card) 60' (goal) 84'; Jaqua 61' | Report | Harris 14' (yellow card) 38'; Pearce (yellow card) 26'; Ihemelu (yellow card) 70' | Stadium: Qwest Field; Attendance: 33,108; Referee: Baldomero Toledo |

=== MLS Cup Playoffs ===
| October 29, 2009 Conf. Semifinals | Seattle Sounders FC | 0–0 | Houston Dynamo | Seattle, Washington |
| 19:00 PDT | Montero (yellow card) 16'; Alonso (yellow card) 64'; Evans (yellow card) 68' | Report | Onstad (yellow card) 16'; Mullan (yellow card) 71'; Chabala (yellow card) 75' | Stadium: Qwest Field; Attendance: 35,807; Referee: Ricardo Salazar |

| November 8, 2009 Conf. Semifinals | Houston Dynamo | 1–0 (a.e.t.) (1–0 agg.) | Seattle Sounders FC | Houston, Texas |
| 15:00 CST | Chabala (yellow card) 44'; Cameron (yellow card) 94+'; Ching 96' | Report | Marshall (yellow card) 24'; Riley (red card) 120'; Ljungberg (yellow card) 121' | Stadium: Robertson Stadium; Attendance: 27,465; Referee: Jorge Gonzalez |

=== U.S. Open Cup ===
| April 28, 2009 Qualification | Seattle Sounders FC | 4–1 | Real Salt Lake | Tukwila, Washington |
| 19:00 PDT | Ianni (yellow card) 20'; Le Toux 25' (pen.) 55'; Nyassi 27' (yellow card) 71'; King 53' | Report | Johnson 32'; Olave (yellow card) 41' | Stadium: Starfire Sports Complex; Attendance: 3,890 |

| May 26, 2009 Qualification | Seattle Sounders FC | 1–0 | Colorado Rapids | Tukwila, Washington |
| 19:00 PDT | Forrest 62' | Report | Harvey (yellow card) 78' | Stadium: Starfire Sports Complex; Attendance: 4,007; Referee: Tony Russo |

| July 1, 2009 Third round | Portland Timbers (USL-1) | 1–2 | Seattle Sounders FC | Portland, Oregon |
| 19:00 PDT | Hayes (yellow card) 26'; Mandjou 43'; McManus (yellow card) 61' | Report | Ianni (yellow card) 5'; Levesque 1'; King 26'; Nyassi (yellow card) 59'; Riley (yellow card) 93+' | Stadium: PGE Park; Attendance: 16,382; Referee: Yeder Reyes |

| July 7, 2009 Quarterfinals | Seattle Sounders FC | 1–0 | Kansas City Wizards | Tukwila, Washington |
| 19:00 PDT | Montero (yellow card) 79'; Le Toux 89' (pen.) | Report | Hirsig (yellow card) 76' (red card) 92+' | Stadium: Starfire Sports Complex; Attendance: 4,352; Referee: Abiodun Okulaja |

| July 21, 2009 Semifinals | Seattle Sounders FC | 2–1 (a.e.t.) | Houston Dynamo | Tukwila, Washington |
| 19:00 PDT | Jaqua (yellow card) 62'; Hurtado (yellow card) 67' (yellow-red card) 110'; Marshall (yellow card) 80'; Jaqua 89'; King 95' | Report | James (yellow card) 30'; Boswell (yellow card) 30'; Akinbiyi 32'; Davis (yellow card) 43'; Mullan (yellow card) 70'; Chabala (yellow card) 90' | Stadium: Starfire Sports Complex; Attendance: 4,895; Referee: Edvin Jurisevic |

| September 2, 2009 Final | D. C. United | 1–2 | Seattle Sounders FC | Washington, D.C. |
| 19:30 EDT | Wicks (red card) 69'; Simms 89' | Report | Ianni (yellow card) 25'; Gonzalez (yellow card) 49'; Montero 67'; Vagenas (yellow card) 79'; Levesque 86' | Stadium: RFK Stadium; Attendance: 17,329; Referee: Alex Prus |

=== Friendlies ===
| July 18, 2009 | Seattle Sounders FC | 0–2 | Chelsea | Seattle, Washington |
| | | Report | Sturridge 12'; Lampard 35' (yellow card) 91+' | Stadium: Qwest Field; Attendance: 65,289; Referee: Carlos Vences |

| August 5, 2009 | Seattle Sounders FC | 0–4 | FC Barcelona | Seattle, Washington |
| | Fucito (yellow card) 83' | Report | Messi 21' 41'; Busquets (yellow card) 31'; Jeffrén 75'; Pedro 89' | Stadium: Qwest Field; Attendance: 66,848; Referee: Mark Geiger |

== Competitions ==
=== Standings ===
Western Conference

| Pos | Team | Pld | W | L | T | GF | GA | GD | Pts | Qualification |
|---|---|---|---|---|---|---|---|---|---|---|
| 1 | LA Galaxy | 30 | 12 | 6 | 12 | 36 | 31 | +5 | 48 | MLS Cup Playoffs |
| 2 | Houston Dynamo | 30 | 13 | 8 | 9 | 39 | 29 | +10 | 48 | MLS Cup Playoffs |
| 3 | Seattle Sounders FC | 30 | 12 | 7 | 11 | 38 | 29 | +9 | 47 | MLS Cup Playoffs |
| 4 | Chivas USA | 30 | 13 | 11 | 6 | 34 | 31 | +3 | 45 | MLS Cup Playoffs |
| 5 | Real Salt Lake | 30 | 11 | 12 | 7 | 43 | 35 | +8 | 40 | MLS Cup Playoffs |

Source: MLS

Overall

| Pos | Team | Pld | W | L | T | GF | GA | GD | Pts | Qualification |
|---|---|---|---|---|---|---|---|---|---|---|
| 1 | Columbus Crew (S) | 30 | 13 | 7 | 10 | 41 | 31 | +10 | 49 | CONCACAF Champions League |
| 2 | LA Galaxy | 30 | 12 | 6 | 12 | 36 | 31 | +5 | 48 | CONCACAF Champions League |
| 3 | Houston Dynamo | 30 | 13 | 8 | 9 | 39 | 29 | +10 | 48 | North American SuperLiga |
| 4 | Seattle Sounders FC | 30 | 12 | 7 | 11 | 38 | 29 | +9 | 47 | CONCACAF Champions League |
| 5 | Chicago Fire | 30 | 11 | 7 | 12 | 39 | 34 | +5 | 45 | North American SuperLiga |
| 6 | Chivas USA | 30 | 13 | 11 | 6 | 34 | 31 | +3 | 45 | North American SuperLiga |
| 7 | New England Revolution | 30 | 11 | 10 | 9 | 33 | 37 | −4 | 42 | North American SuperLiga |
| 8 | Real Salt Lake (C) | 30 | 11 | 12 | 7 | 43 | 35 | +8 | 40 | CONCACAF Champions League |

Source: MLS
Rules for classification: 1) points; 2) head-to-head record; 3) goal difference; 4) number of goals scored
(C) Champions; (S) Supporters' Shield

=== Summary ===
| Overall | | | | | | | | Home | | | | | | Away | | | | | |
| Pld | Pts | W | L | T | GF | GA | GD | W | L | T | GF | GA | GD | W | L | T | GF | GA | GD |
|---|---|---|---|---|---|---|---|---|---|---|---|---|---|---|---|---|---|---|---|
| 30 | 47 | 12 | 7 | 11 | 38 | 29 | +9 | 7 | 2 | 6 | 21 | 10 | +11 | 5 | 5 | 5 | 17 | 19 | −2 |

Last updated: October 24, 2009
Source: MLSNet.com (archived January 19, 2010)
Pld = Matches played; Pts = Points; W = Matches won; T = Matches tied; L = Matches lost; GF = Goals for; GA = Goals against; GD = Goal difference

| Round | 1 | 2 | 3 | 4 | 5 | 6 | 7 | 8 | 9 | 10 | 11 | 12 | 13 | 14 | 15 | 16 | 17 | 18 | 19 | 20 | 21 | 22 | 23 | 24 | 25 | 26 | 27 | 28 | 29 | 30 |
|---|---|---|---|---|---|---|---|---|---|---|---|---|---|---|---|---|---|---|---|---|---|---|---|---|---|---|---|---|---|---|
| Stadium | H | H | A | H | A | H | A | H | A | A | H | A | H | H | A | H | H | H | A | A | A | H | A | H | A | H | A | A | A | H |
| Result | W | W | W | L | L | W | D | D | D | D | D | L | W | D | D | W | W | D | L | L | W | L | D | D | W | D | L | W | W | W |
| Conference | 1 | 1 | 1 | 2 | 2 | 2 | 2 | 2 | 2 | 2 | 3 | 3 | 3 | 3 | 3 | 3 | 2 | 2 | 2 | 4 | 2 | 3 | 4 | 3 | 3 | 3 | 5 | 4 | 4 | 3 |
| Overall | 1 | 1 | 1 | 2 | 2 | 2 | 2 | 2 | 2 | 3 | 4 | 5 | 5 | 4 | 4 | 3 | 2 | 3 | 4 | 6 | 4 | 5 | 6 | 5 | 5 | 5 | 6 | 5 | 5 | 4 |

Updated to match(es) played on October 25, 2009. Source: MLS
A = Away; H = Home; W = Win; D = Draw; L = Loss

== Squad ==
Statistics are from all MLS matches. Ages are as of March 19, 2009 (the date of their season opener). Source: MLSNet.com Sounders FC Stats. Last updated: October 4, 2009.

| Nat | No | Player | Age | Pos | Starts | Apps | G | A | Booked | Sent off (straight red) | Acquired |
|---|---|---|---|---|---|---|---|---|---|---|---|
| USA | 2 | Mike Fucito | March 29, 1985 (aged 23) | FW | 0 | 0 | 0 | 0 | 0 | 0 | SuperDraft |
| USA | 3 | Brad Evans | April 20, 1985 (aged 23) | MF | 23 | 25 | 2 | 2 | 4 | 0 | Expansion Draft |
| USA | 4 | Patrick Ianni | June 15, 1985 (aged 23) | DF | 10 | 17 | 1 | 2 | 3 | 0 | Trade |
| USA | 5 | Tyson Wahl | February 23, 1984 (aged 25) | DF | 9 | 11 | 0 | 0 | 1 | 0 | Expansion Draft |
| CUB | 6 | Osvaldo Alonso | November 11, 1985 (aged 23) | MF | 24 | 25 | 1 | 3 | 4 | 0 | Signed |
| USA | 7 | James Riley | October 27, 1982 (aged 26) | DF | 26 | 26 | 0 | 4 | 3 | 2 | Expansion Draft |
| USA | 8 | Peter Vagenas | February 6, 1978 (aged 31) | MF | 8 | 13 | 0 | 2 | 3 | 0 | Expansion Draft |
| FRA | 9 | Sébastien Le Toux | January 20, 1984 (aged 25) | FW | 15 | 26 | 1 | 3 | 0 | 0 | Signed from USL Sounders |
| SWE | 10 | Freddie Ljungberg | April 16, 1977 (aged 31) | MF | 19 | 20 | 2 | 5 | 6 | 1 | Signed Designated Player |
| COD | 11 | Steve Zakuani | February 9, 1988 (aged 21) | FW | 22 | 27 | 4 | 4 | 1 | 0 | SuperDraft |
| USA | 12 | Nathan Sturgis | July 6, 1987 (aged 21) | DF | 5 | 9 | 0 | 0 | 0 | 0 | Expansion Draft |
| JAM | 14 | Tyrone Marshall | November 12, 1974 (aged 34) | DF | 23 | 24 | 1 | 1 | 6 | 2 | Trade |
| USA | 15 | Stephen King | March 6, 1986 (aged 23) | MF | 3 | 10 | 0 | 0 | 0 | 0 | Expansion Draft |
| USA | 16 | Evan Brown | May 1, 1987 (aged 21) | DF | 0 | 0 | 0 | 0 | 0 | 0 | SuperDraft |
| COL | 17 | Fredy Montero | July 26, 1987 (aged 21) | FW | 25 | 25 | 12 | 6 | 5 | 1 | Signed On Loan |
| USA | 18 | Kasey Keller | November 29, 1969 (aged 39) | GK | 27 | 27 | 0 | 0 | 0 | 1 | Signed |
| CRC | 19 | Leonardo González | November 21, 1980 (aged 28) | DF | 9 | 9 | 0 | 0 | 1 | 0 | Signed |
| USA | 20 | Zach Scott | July 2, 1980 (aged 28) | DF | 6 | 9 | 0 | 0 | 2 | 0 | Signed from USL Sounders |
| USA | 21 | Nate Jaqua | October 28, 1981 (aged 27) | FW | 25 | 26 | 7 | 7 | 6 | 1 | Expansion Draft |
| GAM | 23 | Sanna Nyassi | January 31, 1989 (aged 20) | MF | 2 | 14 | 0 | 0 | 2 | 0 | Signed |
| USA | 24 | Roger Levesque | January 22, 1981 (aged 28) | FW | 2 | 12 | 1 | 0 | 1 | 0 | Signed from USL Sounders |
| Puerto Rico | 26 | Taylor Graham | June 3, 1980 (aged 28) | DF | 0 | 0 | 0 | 0 | 0 | 0 | Signed from USL Sounders |
| COL | 34 | Jhon Kennedy Hurtado | May 16, 1984 (aged 24) | DF | 24 | 25 | 1 | 1 | 8 | 0 | Signed |
| | | | | | | | 33 | 40 | 56 | 8 | |

Goalkeepers

| Nat | No | Player | Age | Starts | Apps | GA | GAA | CS | Acquired |
|---|---|---|---|---|---|---|---|---|---|
| USA | 1 | Chris Eylander | March 14, 1984 (aged 25) | 1 | 1 | 2 | 2 | 0 | Signed from USL Sounders |
| USA | 18 | Kasey Keller | November 29, 1969 (aged 39) | 27 | 27 | 23 | 0.87 | 10 | Signed |
| USA | 22 | Ben Dragavon | December 31, 1983 (aged 25) | 0 | 1 | 1 | 1.53 | 0 | MLS goalkeeper pool |
| PUR | 28 | Terry Boss | September 1, 1981 (aged 27) | 0 | 0 | 0 | 0 | 0 | Signed |
| | | | | | | 26 | 0.93 | 10 | |

=== Transfers ===
In

Note: Flags indicate national team as defined under FIFA eligibility rules; some limited exceptions apply. Players may hold more than one non-FIFA nationality.

| No. | Pos. | Nation | Player |
|---|---|---|---|
| 19 | FW | USA | Kevin Forrest (from Colorado Rapids, Free) |
| 27 | MF | USA | Lamar Neagle (Free) |

| No. | Pos. | Nation | Player |
|---|---|---|---|
| 28 | GK | PUR | Terry Boss (Free) |
| 19 | DF | CRC | Leonardo González (from Liberia Mia, Free) |

Out

Note: Flags indicate national team as defined under FIFA eligibility rules; some limited exceptions apply. Players may hold more than one non-FIFA nationality.

| No. | Pos. | Nation | Player |
|---|---|---|---|
| — | DF | USA | Jeff Parke (to Vancouver Whitecaps FC, Free) |

| No. | Pos. | Nation | Player |
|---|---|---|---|
| 19 | FW | USA | Kevin Forrest (Released on waivers) |
| 13 | FW | NZL | Jarrod Smith (Released on waivers) |

== Player awards and honors ==
MLS All-Stars

- Kasey Keller – GK – First XI
- Freddie Ljungberg – MF – First XI
- Jhon Kennedy Hurtado – DF – Coach's selection
- Fredy Montero – FW – Coach's selection

U.S. Open Cup

- Sebastian Le Toux – Player of the Round (Semifinals)
- Fredy Montero – Player of the Round (Final)
- Kasey Keller – Player of the Tournament

MLS Player of the Week

- Fredy Montero – Week 1
- Kasey Keller – Week 2
- Nate Jaqua – Week 15

MLS Player of the Month

- Fredy Montero – March
- Freddie Ljungberg – October

MLS Goal of the Week

- Fredy Montero – Week 1
- Fredy Montero – Week 2
- Nate Jaqua – Week 11
- Nate Jaqua – Week 15
- Patrick Ianni – Week 17
- Steve Zakuani – Week 22
- Nate Jaqua – Week 23

MLS Save of the Week

- Kasey Keller – Week 10
- Kasey Keller – Week 21
- Tyrone Marshall – Week 29

MLS Newcomer of the Year

- Fredy Montero

== Golden Scarf ==
Before each home game, Sounders FC honors a member of the community or special guest with a Golden Scarf.

| Date | Opponent | Recipient | Notes |
|---|---|---|---|
| March 19, 2009 | New York Red Bulls | Don Garber | MLS Commissioner |
| March 28, 2009 | Real Salt Lake | Jimmy Gabriel | NASL Sounders legend |
| April 11, 2009 | Kansas City Wizards | Robbie Bach | Microsoft executive |
| April 24, 2009 | San Jose Earthquakes | Jimmy McAlister | NASL Sounders legend |
| May 10, 2009 | Los Angeles Galaxy | Meredith Teague | 2009 NCAA Div II soccer National Player of the Year |
| May 31, 2009 | Columbus Crew | Jim Mora | Seahawks head coach |
| June 13, 2009 | San Jose Earthquakes | Fred Mendoza | Seattle Public Stadium Authority (Qwest Field) chairman |
| June 17, 2009 | D.C. United | Sue Bird & Swin Cash | WNBA Seattle Storm team |
| June 28, 2009 | Colorado Rapids | Lorenzo Romar | UW Men's Basketball coach |
| July 11, 2009 | Houston Dynamo | Doug Andreassen | Washington Youth Soccer President |
| July 18, 2009 | Chelsea | Dale Chihuly | Glass artist, creator of the sculpture presented to friendly opponents |
| July 25, 2009 | Chicago Fire | Mike Ryan | First U.S. women's national soccer team coach |
| August 5, 2009 | FC Barcelona | Bill Russell | NBA Hall of Famer and Seattle resident |
| August 20, 2009 | New England Revolution | John Nordstrom | NASL Sounders co-founder |
| August 29, 2009 | Toronto FC | Michelle Akers | Former US Women's National Team striker |
| September 19, 2009 | Chivas USA | Alan Hinton | Former coach of NASL Sounders |
