= List of Seattle Sounders FC records and statistics =

Seattle Sounders FC is an American professional soccer club based in Seattle, Washington that competes in Major League Soccer (MLS). Sounders FC was established on November 13, 2007, as an MLS expansion team, making it the 15th team in the league. Fans chose the Sounders name through an online poll in 2008, making the Seattle Sounders FC the third Seattle soccer club to share the name. The list encompasses the major honors won by Seattle Sounders FC, records set by the club, their managers and their players.

== Honors ==
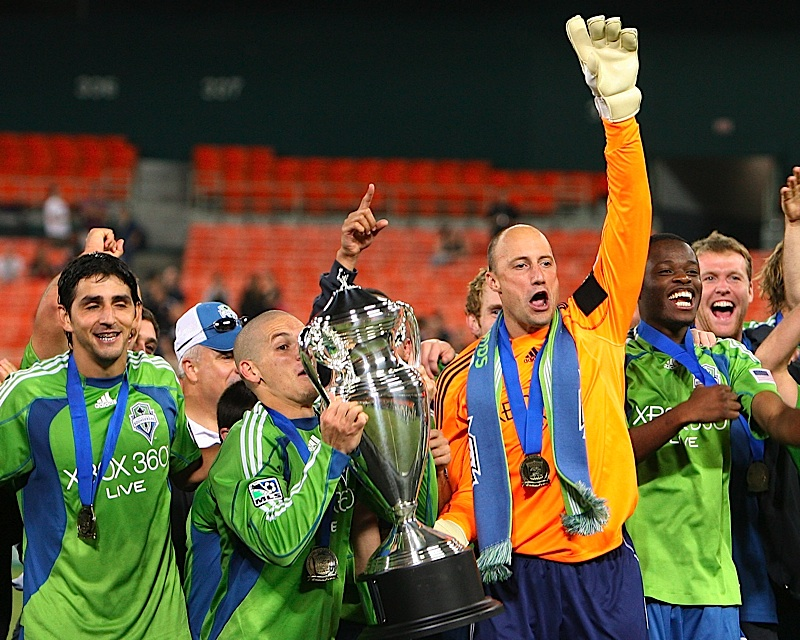
Players celebrate after winning the 2009 U.S. Open Cup

Seattle Sounders' first trophy was the 2009 U.S. Open Cup, which they won against D.C. United. The club also won the Heritage Cup for the first time the following year against the San Jose Earthquakes.

=== National competitions ===
MLS Cup

- Winners (2): 2016, 2019
- Runners-up (2): 2017, 2020

Supporters' Shield

- Winners (1): 2014
- Runners-up (1): 2011

U.S. Open Cup

- Winners (4): 2009, 2010, 2011, 2014
- Runners-up (1): 2012

=== Continental competitions ===
CONCACAF Champions League

- Winners (1): 2022

Leagues Cup

- Winners (1): 2025
- Runners-up (1): 2021

=== Friendly trophies and other awards ===
Cascadia Cup: 5

- 2011, 2015, 2018, 2019, 2021

Heritage Cup: 9

- 2010, 2011, 2013, 2016, 2017, 2018, 2019, 2021, 2025

Community Shield: 2

- 2011, 2012

Desert Diamond Cup: 1

- 2013

MLS Fair Play Award: 1

- 2017

CCL Fair Play Award: 1

- 2022

== Player records ==
=== Goals scored ===
Competitive, professional matches only.

As of November 19, 2026

| Rank | Name | Years | League | MLS is Back Tournament | U.S. Open Cup | Champions League | Leagues Cup | MLS Cup/Post Season | Total |
|---|---|---|---|---|---|---|---|---|---|
| 1 | (United States) Jordan Morris | 2016–present | 74 | 1 | 1 | 4 | 4 | 11 | 95 |
| 2 | (Peru) Raúl Ruidíaz | 2018–2024 | 71 | 1 | 0 | 3 | 2 | 9 | 86 |
| 3 | (Colombia) Fredy Montero | 2009–2012, 2021–2024 | 59 | 0 | 10 | 9 | 1 | 0 | 79 |
| 4 | (Uruguay) Nicolás Lodeiro | 2016–2023 | 40 | 1 | 0 | 7 | 2 | 8 | 58 |
| 5 | (United States) Clint Dempsey | 2013–2018 | 47 | 0 | 1 | 3 | 0 | 6 | 57 |
| 6 | (United States) Cristian Roldan | 2015–present | 38 | 0 | 2 | 2 | 1 | 1 | 44 |
| 7 | (Nigeria) Obafemi Martins | 2013–2015 | 40 | 0 | 3 | 0 | 0 | 0 | 43 |
| 8 | (Slovakia) Albert Rusnák | 2022– present | 34 | 0 | 0 | 2 | 2 | 4 | 42 |
| 9 | (United States) Lamar Neagle | 2009, 2011, 2013–2015, 2017–2018 | 29 | 0 | 1 | 4 | 0 | 1 | 35 |
| 10 | (United States) Will Bruin | 2017–2022 | 27 | 1 | 0 | 1 | 0 | 3 | 32 |
| 11 | (United States) Eddie Johnson | 2012–2013 | 23 | 0 | 1 | 2 | 0 | 3 | 29 |
| 12 | (United States) Brad Evans | 2009–2017 | 20 | 0 | 2 | 4 | 0 | 2 | 28 |
| 13 | (Cuba) Osvaldo Alonso | 2009–2018 | 10 | 0 | 6 | 2 | 0 | 3 | 21 |
| 14 | (United States) Paul Rothrock | 2023–present | 12 | 0 | 3 | 2 | 3 | 0 | 20 |
| 15 | (Democratic Republic of the Congo) Steve Zakuani | 2009–2013 | 17 | 0 | 0 | 1 | 0 | 1 | 19 |
| 16 | (United States) Nate Jaqua | 2009–2011 | 9 | 0 | 7 | 2 | 0 | 0 | 18 |
| 16 | (Uruguay) Álvaro Fernández | 2010–2012, 2016–2017 | 14 | 0 | 0 | 4 | 0 | 0 | 18 |
| 18 | (United States) Danny Musovski | 2024–present | 12 | 0 | 0 | 2 | 2 | 2 | 18 |
| 19 | (United States) Chad Barrett | 2014–2015 | 12 | 0 | 1 | 0 | 0 | 0 | 13 |
| 20 | (Argentina) Mauro Rosales | 2011–2013 | 12 | 0 | 0 | 0 | 0 | 0 | 12 |
| 20 | (United States) Chad Marshall | 2014–2019 | 10 | 0 | 0 | 1 | 0 | 1 | 12 |

=== Assists ===
MLS Competitive, professional matches only.

As of November 19, 2026

| Rank | Name | Years | League | MLS is Back Tournament | Leagues Cup | MLS Cup/Post Season | Total |
|---|---|---|---|---|---|---|---|
| 1 | (Uruguay) Nicolas Lodeiro | 2016–2023 | 78 | 1 | 0 | 11 | 90 |
| 2 | (United States) Cristian Roldan | 2015–present | 57 | 0 | 6 | 5 | 68 |
| 3 | (Colombia) Fredy Montero | 2009–2012, 2021–2024 | 42 | 0 | 0 | 2 | 44 |
| 4 | (Slovakia) Albert Rusnák | 2022– present | 38 | 0 | 4 | 1 | 43 |
| 5 | (Argentina) Mauro Rosales | 2011–2013 | 34 | 0 | 0 | 0 | 34 |
| 6 | (United States) Jordan Morris | 2016–present | 26 | 2 | 1 | 3 | 32 |
| 7 | (United States) Brad Evans | 2009–2017 | 27 | 0 | 0 | 2 | 29 |
| 7 | (United States) Clint Dempsey | 2013–2018 | 28 | 0 | 0 | 1 | 29 |
| 9 | (Trinidad and Tobago) Joevin Jones | 2016–2017, 2019–2020 | 22 | 1 | 0 | 4 | 27 |
| 10 | (United States) Alex Roldan | 2018–present | 22 | 0 | 3 | 0 | 25 |
| 11 | (Cuba) Osvaldo Alonso | 2009–2018 | 24 | 0 | 0 | 0 | 24 |
| 11 | (Brazil) João Paulo | 2020–2025 | 22 | 0 | 1 | 1 | 24 |
| 13 | (Nigeria) Obafemi Martins | 2013–2015 | 23 | 0 | 0 | 0 | 23 |
| 14 | (Peru) Raúl Ruidíaz | 2018–2024 | 13 | 0 | 0 | 6 | 19 |
| 15 | (United States) Lamar Neagle | 2009, 2011, 2013–2015, 2017–2018 | 17 | 0 | 0 | 0 | 17 |
| 15 | (United States) Jesús Ferreira | 2025–present | 13 | 0 | 1 | 3 | 17 |
| 17 | (United States) Will Bruin | 2017–2022 | 12 | 0 | 1 | 2 | 15 |
| 18 | (Democratic Republic of the Congo) Steve Zakuani | 2009–2013 | 14 | 0 | 0 | 0 | 14 |
| 19 | (Guatemala) Marco Pappa | 2014–2015 | 11 | 0 | 0 | 2 | 13 |
| 19 | (Brazil) Léo Chú | 2021–2024 | 12 | 0 | 1 | 0 | 13 |
| 19 | (Mexico) Obed Vargas | 2022-2025 | 13 | 0 | 0 | 0 | 13 |
| 19 | (United States) Nate Jaqua | 2009–2011 | 12 | 0 | 0 | 1 | 13 |

=== Appearances ===
All statistics are correct as of July 31, 2025.

- Youngest first-team player: Obed Vargas, 15 years and 351 days old (vs. Austin FC, Major League Soccer, July 22, 2021)

==== Oldest ====
All statistics are correct as of May 5, 2014.

- Oldest first-team player: Kasey Keller, 41 years, 11 months, 8 days (vs. Real Salt Lake, Major League Soccer, November 3, 2011)

=== Goalscorers ===
==== In a season ====
All statistics are correct as of October 5, 2014.

- Most MLS goals in a season: 17, Obafemi Martins (2014)
- Most all competition goals in a season: 19, Obafemi Martins (2014)
- Most by a rookie in a season: 12, Jordan Morris (2016)

==== In a single match ====
All statistics are correct as of March 25, 2023.

- Most goals in a single match:

4, Jordan Morris (vs. Sporting Kansas City: Children's Mercy Park; March 25, 2023)

==== Hat-tricks ====
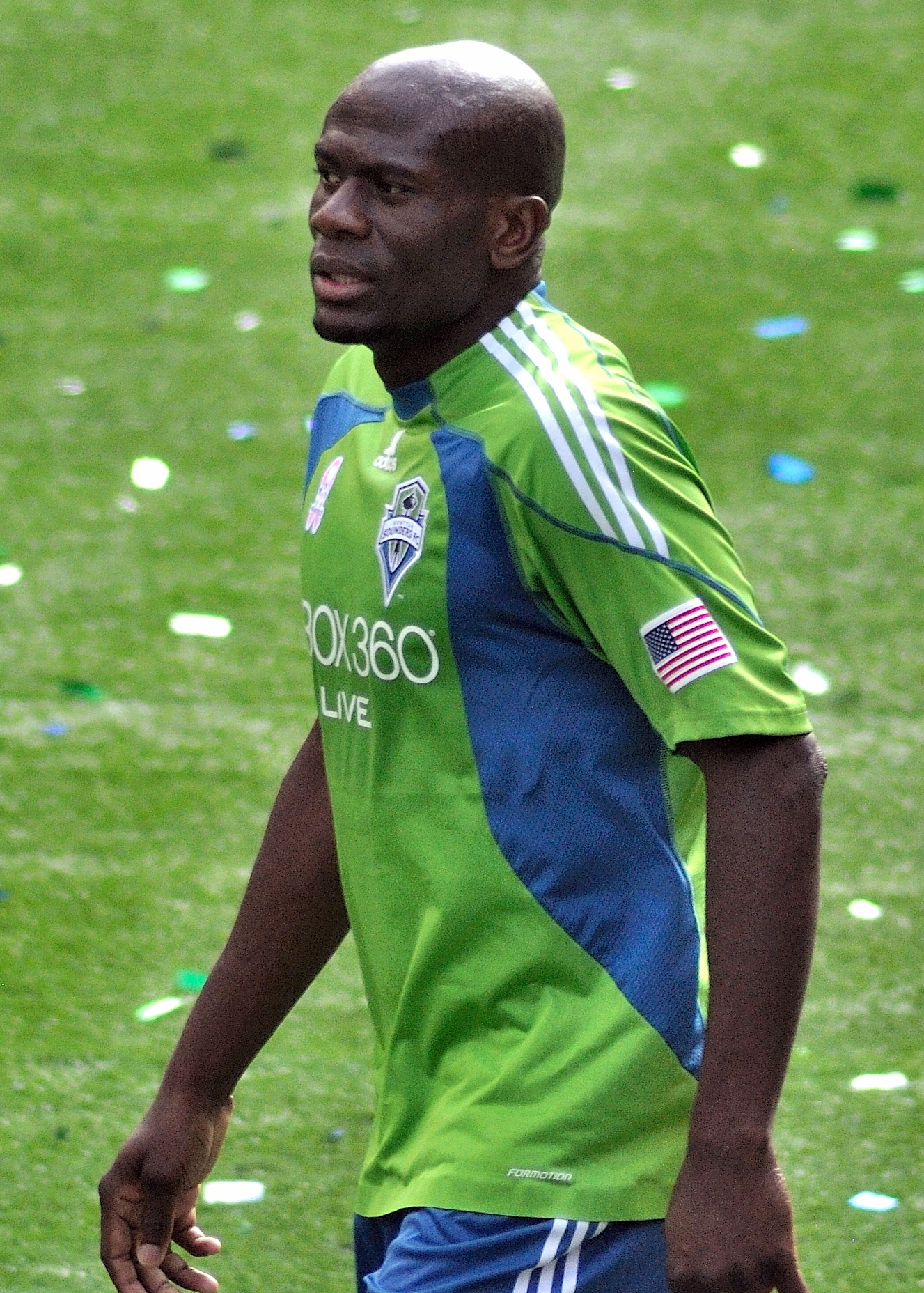
Blaise Nkufo, the first ever player to score a hat-trick for the Sounders

All statistics are correct as of September 9, 2024.

- Sorted by number of goals:

4, Jordan Morris (vs. Sporting Kansas City: Children's Mercy Park; March 25, 2023)
3, Blaise Nkufo (vs. Columbus Crew; Columbus Crew Stadium; September 18, 2010)
3, Lamar Neagle (vs. Columbus Crew; CenturyLink Field; August 27, 2011)
3, David Estrada (vs. Toronto FC: CenturyLink Field; March 17, 2012)
3, Fredy Montero (vs. Chivas USA: Home Depot Center; August 25, 2012)
3, Clint Dempsey (vs. Portland Timbers: Providence Park; April 5, 2014)
3, Clint Dempsey (vs. Orlando City SC: Camping World Stadium; August 7, 2016)
3, Jordan Morris (vs. FC Dallas: CenturyLink Field; October 19, 2019, 2019 MLS Cup Playoffs)
3, Albert Rusnák (vs. Columbus Crew: Lower.com Field; September 7, 2024)
3, Danny Musovski (vs. Sporting Kansas City: Lumen Field; August 24, 2025)

=== Assists ===
==== In a single match ====
All statistics are correct as of March 25, 2023.

- Most assists in a single match:

4, Léo Chú (vs. Sporting Kansas City: Children's Mercy Park; March 25, 2023)

=== Goalkeepers ===
==== In a single match ====
All statistics are correct as of March 7, 2023.

- Most saves in a single match:

11, Stefan Frei (vs. New York Red Bulls: Red Bull Arena; June 13, 2018)

- Most shots faced in a single match:

11, Kasey Keller (vs. San Jose Earthquakes: Buck Shaw Stadium; August 2, 2009)

- Most goals allowed in a single match:

5, Michael Gspurning (vs. Colorado Rapids: Dick's Sporting Goods Park; October 5, 2013)
5, Stefan Frei (vs. New England Revolution: Gillette Stadium; May 11, 2014)

=== Fastest ===
- Fastest recorded goal:

23 seconds, Clint Dempsey (vs. San Jose Earthquakes, March 14, 2015)
45 seconds, Jordan Morris (vs. LAFC, April 28, 2019)
1:28 minute, Cristian Roldan (vs. Colorado Rapids, October 3, 2021)
4 minutes, Blaise Nkufo (vs. Columbus Crew, September 18, 2010)
4 minutes, Lamar Neagle (vs. Columbus Crew, August 27, 2011)
4 minutes, Cristian Roldan (vs. Portland Timbers, May 27, 2017)
4 minutes, Jordan Morris (vs. San Jose Earthquakes, September 10, 2020)

- Fastest 2 goals: 1:01, Jordan Morris (vs. Los Angeles FC, August 30, 2020)
- Fastest yellow card: 1 minute, Tyrone Marshall (vs. Chicago Fire, May 2, 2009)
- Fastest red card: 7 minutes, Leonardo González (vs. Columbus Crew, August 31, 2013)

=== International ===
All statistics are correct as of January 1, 2023.

- Most capped player: Clint Dempsey; for United States with 141 caps.
- Most international goals: Clint Dempsey; for United States with 57 goals.
- First player to appear in the World Cup: Kasey Keller; for the United States against Germany in Paris on June 15, 1998.
- Most World Cup appearances: Clint Dempsey; 10 (2 in 2006, 4 in 2010, 4 in 2014).
- First player to score in a World Cup: Freddie Ljungberg; on June 15, 2006, against Paraguay.
- Most recent player to appear in a World Cup: Jordan Morris; on December 3, 2022, against the Netherlands

== Award winners ==
=== Major League Soccer ===
MLS Best XI

The following players have been in the MLS Best XI while playing for the Seattle Sounders:

- (Sweden) Freddie Ljungberg – 2009
- (United States) Kasey Keller – 2011
- (United States) Osvaldo Alonso – 2012
- (United States) Chad Marshall – 2014, 2018
- (Nigeria) Obafemi Martins – 2014
- (Uruguay) Nicolás Lodeiro – 2020
- (United States) Jordan Morris – 2020
- (Peru) Raúl Ruidíaz – 2020, 2021
- (Colombia) Yeimar Gómez Andrade – 2021, 2024
- (Brazil) João Paulo – 2021
- (United States) Cristian Roldan, 2025

MLS Player of the Month

The following players have been MLS Player of the Month while playing for the Seattle Sounders:

- (Colombia) Fredy Montero – March 2009
- (Sweden) Freddie Ljungberg – October 2009
- (Colombia) Fredy Montero – July 2010
- (United States) Clint Dempsey – April 2014
- (Nigeria) Obafemi Martins – September 2014
- (Uruguay) Nicolás Lodeiro – August 2016
- (United States) Chad Marshall – September 2016

MLS Goalkeeper of the Year

The following players have received the MLS Goalkeeper of the Year Award while playing for the Seattle Sounders:

- (United States) Kasey Keller – 2011

MLS Defender of the Year

The following players have received the MLS Defender of the Year Award while playing for the Seattle Sounders:

- (United States) Chad Marshall – 2014

MLS Comeback Player of the Year

The following players have received the MLS Comeback Player of the Year Award while playing for the Seattle Sounders:

- (United States) Eddie Johnson – 2012
- (United States) Clint Dempsey – 2017
- (United States) Jordan Morris – 2019

MLS Newcomer of the Year

The following players have received the MLS Newcomer of the Year Award while playing for the Seattle Sounders:

- (Colombia) Fredy Montero – 2009
- (Argentina) Mauro Rosales – 2011
- (Uruguay) Nicolás Lodeiro – 2016

MLS Rookie of the Year

The following players have been MLS Rookie of the Year while playing for the Seattle Sounders:

- (United States) Jordan Morris – 2016

MLS Save of the Year

The following players have received the MLS Save of the Year Award while playing for the Seattle Sounders:

- (United States) Kasey Keller – 2010, 2011
- (Switzerland) Stefan Frei – 2018, 2021

FutbolMLS.com Latino del Año

The following players have received the Latino del Año award while playing for the Seattle Sounders:

- (Colombia) Fredy Montero – 2010
- (Guatemala) Marco Pappa – 2014
- (Panama) Román Torres – 2016

=== CONCACAF ===
CCL Best Player Award

- (Switzerland) Stefan Frei – 2022

CCL Best Goalkeeper Award

- (Switzerland) Stefan Frei – 2022

CCL Best XI

- (Switzerland) Stefan Frei (GK) – 2022
- (Cameroon) Nouhou Tolo (DF) – 2022
- (Ecuador) Xavier Arreaga (DF) – 2022
- (United States) Jordan Morris (MF) – 2022
- (Uruguay) Nicolás Lodeiro (MF) – 2022
- (United States) Cristian Roldan (MF) – 2022
- (Peru) Raúl Ruidíaz (FW) – 2022

== Coaching records ==
All statistics are correct as of April 28, 2014.

- First full-time coach: Sigi Schmid (coached the club for 194 league matches from March 2009 to July 2016).
- Longest spell as coach: Sigi Schmid (coached the club for 194 league matches from March 2009 to July 2016).
- First coach from outside the United States: Sigi Schmid (German – coached the club for 194 league matches from March 2009 to July 2016).
- First coach to win an MLS Cup: Brian Schmetzer.

== International competition (non MLS matches) ==
=== By opponent ===
As of August 16, 2021

| Club | Pld | W | D | L | GF | GA | GD |
|---|---|---|---|---|---|---|---|
| (El Salvador) Isidro Metapán | 2 | 1 | 1 | 0 | 2 | 1 | +1 |
| (Honduras) Marathón | 4 | 3 | 0 | 1 | 9 | 5 | +4 |
| (Mexico) UANL | 1 | 1 | 0 | 0 | 3 | 0 | +3 |
| (Mexico) Monterrey | 4 | 1 | 0 | 3 | 4 | 7 | −3 |
| (Costa Rica) Saprissa | 2 | 0 | 0 | 2 | 1 | 4 | −3 |
| (Panama) San Francisco | 2 | 1 | 0 | 1 | 2 | 1 | +1 |
| (Guatemala) Comunicaciones | 2 | 1 | 1 | 0 | 6 | 3 | +3 |
| (Costa Rica) Herediano | 2 | 1 | 0 | 1 | 2 | 2 | 0 |
| (Mexico) Santos Laguna | 4 | 1 | 1 | 2 | 4 | 9 | −5 |
| (Trinidad and Tobago) Caledonia AIA | 2 | 2 | 0 | 0 | 6 | 2 | +4 |
| (Mexico) UANL | 2 | 1 | 0 | 1 | 3 | 2 | +1 |
| (Canada) Vancouver Whitecaps FC | 2 | 1 | 1 | 0 | 4 | 1 | +3 |
| (Honduras) Olimpia | 4 | 2 | 2 | 0 | 7 | 5 | +2 |
| (Mexico) América | 2 | 0 | 1 | 1 | 3 | 5 | −2 |
| (El Salvador) Santa Tecla | 2 | 1 | 0 | 1 | 5 | 2 | +3 |
| (Mexico) Guadalajara | 2 | 1 | 0 | 1 | 1 | 3 | −2 |
| Total | 38 | 17 | 7 | 14 | 59 | 52 | +7 |

== Team records ==
=== Matches ===
All statistics are correct as of February 4, 2023.

- First match: Los Angeles Galaxy 1–3 Seattle Sounders FC; preseason; February 9, 2009.
- First Major League Soccer match : Seattle Sounders FC 3–0 New York Red Bulls; Qwest Field; March 19, 2009.
- First MLS Cup Playoffs match: Seattle Sounders FC 0–0 Houston Dynamo; Qwest Field; October 29, 2009.
- First Heritage Cup match: Seattle Sounders FC 2–1 San Jose Earthquakes, Qwest Field; June 13, 2009.
- First Seattle Sounders FC Community Shield match: Seattle Sounders FC 0–1 Portland Timbers; March 11, 2010
- First Cascadia Cup match: Seattle Sounders FC 1–1 Portland Timbers; Qwest Field; May 14, 2011
- First CONCACAF Champions League match: Seattle Sounders FC 1–0 Isidro Metapán; Qwest Field; July 28, 2010.
- First World Football Challenge match: Seattle Sounders FC 2–4 Chelsea; CenturyLink Field; July 18, 2012.
- First Leagues Cup match: Seattle Sounders FC 3–0 Tigres UANL; Lumen Field; August 10, 2021
- First FIFA Club World Cup match: Seattle Sounders FC 0–1 Al Ahly; Ibn Batouta Stadium, Tangier; February 4, 2023

=== Record wins ===
All statistics are correct as of July 31, 2025.

- Record win:

Seattle Sounders FC 7–0 Cruz Azul; Lumen Field; July 31, 2025 (Leagues Cup)

- Record Major League Soccer win:

Seattle Sounders FC 7–1 San Jose Earthquakes; CenturyLink Field; September 10, 2020

- Record U.S. Open Cup win:

Seattle Sounders FC 6–0 Chicago Fire; Starfire Sports Complex; August 13, 2014

- Record CONCACAF Champions League win:

Seattle Sounders FC 5–0 Motagua; Lumen Field; February 24, 2022

=== Record losses ===
All statistics are correct as of July 31, 2025.

- Record loss:

Seattle Sounders FC 1–6 Santos Laguna; CONCACAF Champions League; March 11, 2012

- Record Major League Soccer loss:

Seattle Sounders FC 0–5 New England Revolution; Gillette Stadium; May 11, 2014

- Record CONCACAF Champions League loss:

Seattle Sounders FC 1–6 Santos Laguna; CONCACAF Champions League; March 11, 2012

- Record FIFA Club World Cup loss:

Seattle Sounders FC 1–3 Atlético Madrid; June 19, 2025
Seattle Sounders FC 0–2 Paris Saint-Germain; June 23, 2025
