= James Riley (soccer) =

American soccer player (born 1982)

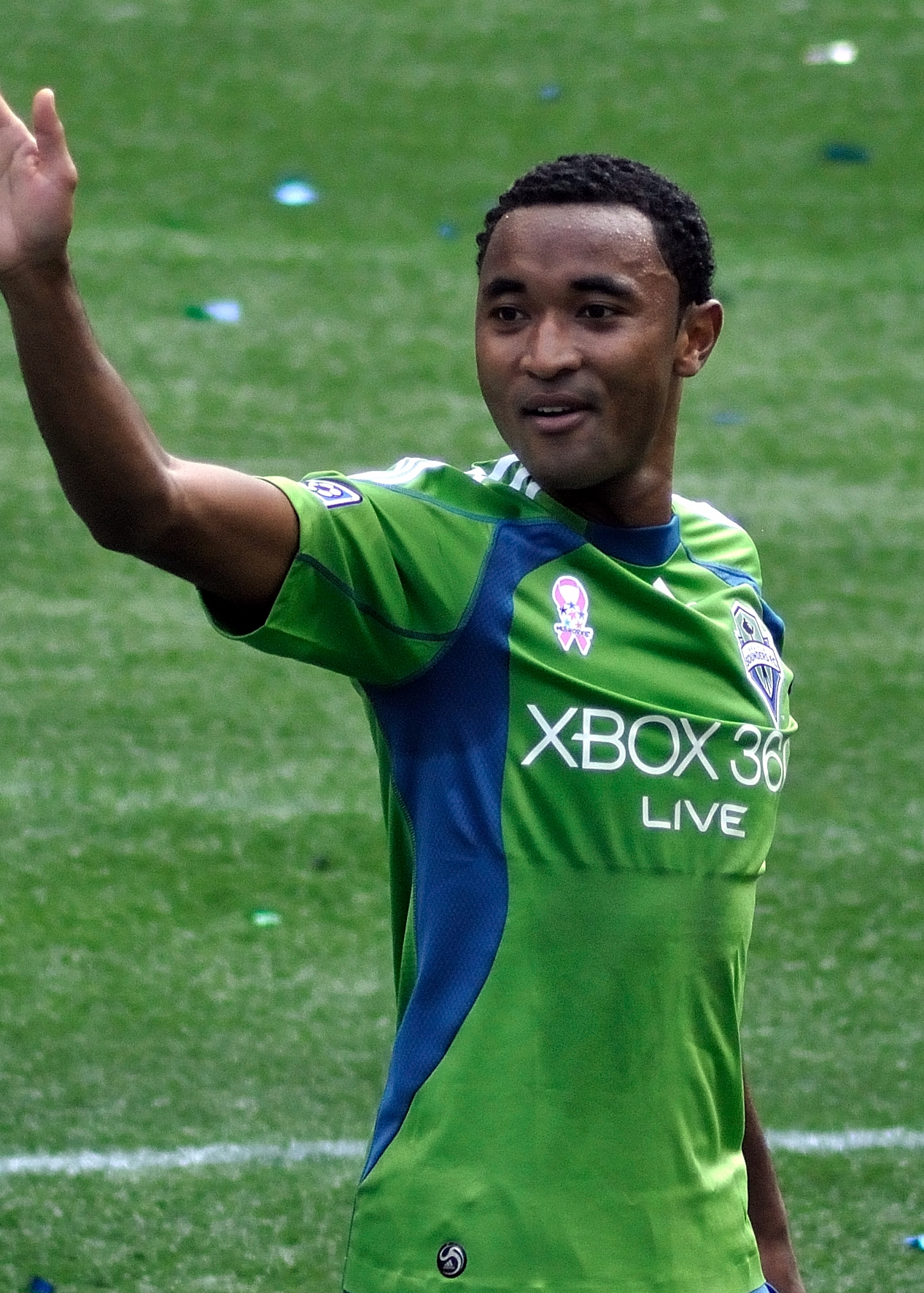
- Riley in 2010

Personal information
- Full name: James Riley
- Date of birth: October 27, 1982 (age 43)
- Place of birth: Colorado Springs, Colorado, United States
- Height: 5 ft 10 in (1.78 m)
- Position: Defender

Youth career
- 1998–2001: Colorado Rush

College career
Years	Team	Apps	(Gls)
2001–2004	Wake Forest Demon Deacons	82	(3)

Senior career*
Years	Team	Apps	(Gls)
2003	Carolina Dynamo	12	(1)
2004	Colorado Springs Blizzard	5	(2)
2005–2007	New England Revolution	70	(1)
2008	San Jose Earthquakes	24	(0)
2009–2011	Seattle Sounders FC	84	(1)
2012	Chivas USA	32	(0)
2013	D.C. United	21	(0)
2014	LA Galaxy	4	(0)
2015	Colorado Rapids	16	(1)
2018–2019	Tacoma Stars (indoor)	2	(1)
Total		268	(6)

International career^{‡}
2018–2019	Cascadia	6	(0)

Managerial career
- 2024–: Ballard FC
- * Club domestic league appearances and goals as of November 26, 2019 ‡ National team caps and goals as of June 9, 2018

James Riley (born October 27, 1982) is an American former soccer player who played as a defender and is currently the head coach for USL League Two club Ballard FC. Riley previously spent eleven seasons in Major League Soccer (MLS) with the New England Revolution (2005–2007), San Jose Earthquakes (2008), Seattle Sounders FC (2009–2011), Chivas USA (2012), D.C. United (2013), LA Galaxy (2014), and the Colorado Rapids (2015). Riley served as the captain of the Cascadia soccer team in the 2018 ConIFA World Football Cup.

== Playing career ==
=== College and amateur ===
Riley played college soccer at Wake Forest University, and in the USL Premier Development League with both Carolina Dynamo and his hometown team, Colorado Springs Blizzard.

=== Professional ===
New England Revolution drafted Riley in the second round of the 2005 MLS SuperDraft, and he acquitted himself well in his rookie season, playing various positions and scoring a goal. He continued to keep himself in the mix in defense, starting the majority of the games in 2006 and 2007.

Riley was selected by the San Jose Earthquakes in the 2007 MLS Expansion Draft and subsequently made 24 appearances for the team before being taken by the Seattle Sounders FC in the 2008 MLS Expansion Draft. He stayed with Seattle through the 2011 season, helping the club win three consecutive U.S. Open Cup championships.

Riley was left exposed by Seattle in the 2011 MLS Expansion Draft and he was selected by expansion side Montreal Impact in the November 23, 2011, draft. He was then immediately traded with allocation money to Chivas USA for Justin Braun and Gerson Mayen. Riley was traded to D.C. United on February 14, 2013, for a 2015 Supplemental Draft pick. The trade was later described as being part of a "systematic expulsion of players" at Chivas USA who did not fit the parent club's Mexican-only policy.

Riley won his 5th US Open Cup title in 2013 with D.C. United. In the sixth minute of stoppage time there was on open header in the box from Álvaro Saborío that Riley was able to deflect onto the cross bar to prevent extra time.

After his release from D.C. United, Riley trialled with and was eventually signed by LA Galaxy as a free agent.

On March 6, 2015, he signed with Colorado Rapids. During the 2015 season, Riley made 17 appearances in all competitions, scoring a lone goal on May 8, 2015, against former club San Jose in the third minute of stoppage time to salvage a 1–1 draw. The Rapids declined their option on Riley on December 3, 2015.

Riley returned to professional soccer on October 5, 2018, signing with the Tacoma Stars of the Major Arena Soccer League.

== Retirement and beyond ==
Riley formally announced his retirement as an active player on June 23, 2016. One month prior, he had been appointed MLS's director of player relations, a position that had been vacant since Ali Curtis became the New York Red Bulls sporting director in December 2014. In April 2018, it was announced that Riley would take a position on the broadcast team for the Seattle Sounders and their USL affiliate team, Seattle Sounders FC 2.

On May 1, 2018, he was announced as the captain for the Cascadia official soccer team to compete at the 2018 ConIFA World Football Cup in London.

Riley joined defending USL League Two champions Ballard FC as the club's head coach on January 10, 2024.

== Personal life ==
Riley was born in Colorado Springs, Colorado, to an African American father and a Korean mother. His parents divorced a year after he was born. Riley and his sister were raised by his mother in the Denver area.

== Career statistics ==
=== Club ===
As of match played October 25, 2015

Years	Club	Competition	Apps.	Goals
2003	Carolina Dynamo	USL Premier Development League	12	1
2004	Colorado Springs Blizzard	USL Premier Development League	5	2
2005	New England Revolution	Major League Soccer	23	1
2006	New England Revolution	Major League Soccer	20	0
2007	New England Revolution	Major League Soccer	27	0
2008	San Jose Earthquakes	Major League Soccer	24	0

Appearances and goals by club, season and competition
Club	Season	League			National Cup		Continental		Other		Total	
Club	Season	Division	Apps	Goals	Apps	Goals	Apps	Goals	Apps	Goals	Apps	Goals
Seattle Sounders FC	2009	Major League Soccer	28	0	5	0	–		2	0	35	0
Seattle Sounders FC	2010	Major League Soccer	27	1	4	0	4	0	2	0	37	1
Seattle Sounders FC	2011	Major League Soccer	29	0	2	0	6	0	1	0	38	0
Seattle Sounders FC	Total		84	1	11	0	10	0	5	0	110	1
Chivas USA	2012	Major League Soccer	32	0	3	0	–		–		35	0
D.C. United	2013	Major League Soccer	21	0	5	0	–		–		26	0
LA Galaxy	2014	Major League Soccer	4	0	0	0	2	0	0	0	6	0
Colorado Rapids	2015	Major League Soccer	16	1	1	0	–		–		17	1
Career total			73	1	9	0	2	0	0	0	84	1

== Honors ==
=== New England Revolution ===
- Lamar Hunt U.S. Open Cup: 2007
- Major League Soccer Eastern Conference Championship: 2005, 2006, 2007

=== Seattle Sounders FC ===
- Lamar Hunt U.S. Open Cup: 2009, 2010, 2011

=== D.C. United ===
- Lamar Hunt U.S. Open Cup: 2013

=== LA Galaxy ===
- MLS Cup: 2014

=== Individual ===
- Prost Amerika's Sounders FC Player of the Year 2009
- MLS W.O.R.K.S. Humanitarian of the Month for October 2010
