= Stephen King (soccer) =

American soccer player (born 1986)

Personal information
- Full name: Stephen King
- Date of birth: March 6, 1986 (age 40)
- Place of birth: Medford, New Jersey, United States
- Height: 5 ft 8 in (1.73 m)
- Position: Midfielder

College career
Years	Team	Apps	(Gls)
2004–2007	Maryland Terrapins	93	(30)

Senior career*
Years	Team	Apps	(Gls)
2008	Chicago Fire	20	(2)
2009–2010	Seattle Sounders FC	10	(0)
2010–2012	D.C. United	47	(1)
- * Club domestic league appearances and goals as of November 1, 2012

Stephen King (born March 6, 1986) is an American former professional soccer player.

== Career ==
=== Youth and high school ===
King attended Shawnee High School where he was a four-year starter (2000–03) under coach Brian Gibney. He led the Renegades to a 99–5–3 record during his tenure, including 2001 and 2003 Group IV state championships. During the latter title run, King's senior year, he recorded 24 goals and 27 assists. King was named the New Jersey Gatorade and NSCAA Player of the Year. He was also selected as a Parade, EA Student Sports and NSCAA/adidas All-American. Additionally, King was named a USYSA Inter-Regional All-American and finished his prep career with 46 goals and 56 assists.

King was selected to play for the Region I Olympic Development Program team from 1999 to 2004 and participated as a U–16 national pool player. During his earlier years he was the captain of the U–15 national team and also played for the nationally prominent FC Delco club team.

=== College ===
Heavily recruited out of high school, King chose the University of Maryland over other high-profile schools such as Wake Forest, Duke, Boston College, Harvard, St. John's and Rutgers.

During his four-year tenure in which he started all 93 contests he played in (a Maryland career starts record), King would lead the Terrapins to two NCAA Sweet Sixteens, the 2004 College Cup, and the 2005 National Championship. He was a Hermann Trophy semi-finalist for his junior and senior seasons, and a Lowe's Senior CLASS Award, College Soccer News First Team All-American and First Team All-ACC for his senior season. According to UMTerps.cstv.com, "King finished his career second all-time in assists at Maryland with 33 while his 93 career points ranks sixth. He also scored 30 goals which is one away from the top 10. His three-assist performance against No. 14 Virginia on November 3, 2007 tied the program record for assists in a game. He racked up 13 assists in 2007 which is the second most in school history in a single season."

King was also named the 2007 ACC Scholar-Athlete of the Year for men's soccer, an award for recognizing the top junior or senior student-athlete in each respective ACC sport. Candidates must maintain a career 3.0 or better grade point average and have gotten 3.0+ each of their past two semesters to qualify. He was also named to ESPN The Magazine's 2007 Academic All-America Men's Soccer Team.

=== Professional ===
On January 18, 2008, King became the Maryland Terrapins' 22nd MLS draftee since its inception in 1996. The Chicago Fire selected him in the third round (40th overall). He made his MLS debut against Real Salt Lake on March 29, entering in the 54th minute., and made his first career start against the San Jose Earthquakes on April 12.

King scored his first MLS goal against the New England Revolution on May 3. It was an unassisted goal in the 76th minute.

On November 26, 2008, King was selected by Seattle Sounders FC in the fourth round of the 2008 MLS Expansion Draft. He made his Sounders debut on May 2, 2009, appearing as a substitute against his old club Chicago Fire FC.

King was traded to D.C. United on April 30, 2010. Seattle received a second-round pick in the 2011 MLS SuperDraft in exchange. He made his debut for DC a day later in a 2–0 loss at home to the New York Red Bulls. King signed a new contract with D.C. on September 8, 2011. Terms were undisclosed.

King was released by D.C. United on December 18, 2012.

=== Statistics ===
Season	Club	Country	Competition	Apps.	Goals	Assists
2008	Chicago Fire FC	United States	Major League Soccer	20	2	1
2009	Seattle Sounders FC	United States	Major League Soccer	10	0	0
2010	Seattle Sounders FC	United States	Major League Soccer	0	0	0
2010	D.C. United	United States	Major League Soccer	20	0	1
2011	D.C. United	United States	Major League Soccer	20	1	0
2012	D.C. United	United States	Major League Soccer	7	0	1
Total	Last Updated	May 5, 2023		77	3	3

== Honors ==
=== Seattle Sounders FC ===
- U.S. Open Cup (1): 2009

== Personal ==
King is the son of Douglas and Jayne King, and has two brothers, Brian and Sean.

== See also ==
- 2008 MLS Expansion Draft
- 2008 MLS SuperDraft
