= 2008 MLS expansion draft =

Player draft for Seattle Sounders FC

2008 MLS Expansion Draft

General information
- Date: November 26, 2008

Overview
- Expansion team: Seattle Sounders FC
- Expansion season: 2009

The 2008 MLS Expansion Draft took place on November 26, 2008, and was a special draft for the Major League Soccer expansion team Seattle Sounders FC. They made 10 selections from a pool of players from the other 14 MLS clubs.

== Format ==
- Only one player could be selected from each team. Four of the league's 14 current teams did not have a player selected.
- Teams were allowed to protect 11 players from their 28-man rosters. Generation Adidas players were automatically protected, though players who are graduated from the program to the senior roster at the end of the 2008 season were not.
- Teams with 4 or more international players were required to protect 3 of them. If a team had 3 or fewer international players, then it was required to protect all but one.
- Any developmental players selected were required to be moved up to the senior roster for the 2009 season.

== Expansion Draft Results ==
#	Player	Position	Country	Previous club
1	Nate Jaqua	F	United States	Houston Dynamo
2	Nathan Sturgis	M	United States	Real Salt Lake
3	Jeff Parke	D	United States	New York Red Bulls
4	Jarrod Smith	F	New Zealand	Toronto FC
5	Khano Smith	M	Bermuda	New England Revolution
6	Peter Vagenas	M	United States	Los Angeles Galaxy
7	Tyson Wahl	D	United States	Kansas City Wizards
8	James Riley	D	United States	San Jose Earthquakes
9	Stephen King	M	United States	Chicago Fire
10	Brad Evans	M	United States	Columbus Crew

== Team-by-team breakdown ==
=== Chicago Fire ===
Exposed	Protected	Exempt
Mike Banner	Cuauhtémoc Blanco	Patrick Nyarko
C. J. Brown	Jon Busch	
Calen Carr	Wilman Conde, Jr.	
Tomasz Frankowski	Justin Mapp	
Andy Herron	Brian McBride	
Kai Kasiguran	Logan Pause	
Tyler Kettering	Dasan Robinson	
Stephen King	Chris Rolfe	
Peter Lowry	Gonzalo Segares	
Líder Mármol	Bakary Soumare	
Nick Noble	John Thorrington	
Marco Pappa		
Brandon Prideaux		
Austin Washington		
Daniel Woolard		

=== Chivas USA ===
Exposed	Protected	Exempt
Kraig Chiles	Bobby Burling	
Jim Curtin	Jonathan Bornstein	
Dejair	Justin Braun	
Eric Ebert	Alecko Eskandarian	
Jorge Flores	Maykel Galindo	
Anthony Hamilton	Atiba Harris	
Dan Kennedy	Sacha Kljestan	
Gerson Mayen	Jesse Marsch	
Roberto Nurse	Francisco Mendoza	
Daniel Paladini	Paulo Nagamura	
Lance Parker	Shavar Thomas	
Ante Razov		
Keith Savage		
Claudio Suárez		
Carey Talley		
Zach Thornton		
Lawson Vaughn		
Sasha Victorine		
Raphaël Wicky		
Alex Zotinca		

=== Colorado Rapids ===
Exposed	Protected	Exempt
José Burciaga, Jr.	Mehdi Ballouchy	Nico Colaluca
Preston Burpo	Conor Casey	Ciaran O'Brien
Terry Cooke	Colin Clark	
Greg Dalby	Bouna Coundoul	
John DiRaimondo	Omar Cummings	
Facundo Erpen	Cory Gibbs	
Brian Grazier	Christian Gómez	
Jordan Harvey	Ugo Ihemelu	
Justin Hughes	Nick LaBrocca	
Stephen Keel	Pablo Mastroeni	
Kosuke Kimura	Jacob Peterson	
Tam McManus		
Mike Petke		
Kwame Sarkodie		
Tim Ward		
Cesar Zambrano		

=== Columbus Crew ===
Exposed	Protected	Exempt
Kevin Burns	Guillermo Barros Schelotto	Jed Zayner
Cory Elenio	Brian Carroll	
Brad Evans	Emmanuel Ekpo	
Jason Garey	Frankie Hejduk	
Eddie Gaven	Will Hesmer	
Andy Gruenebaum	Andy Iro	
Ezra Hendrickson	Chad Marshall	
George Josten	Alejandro Moreno	
Ryan Junge	Danny O'Rourke	
Steven Lenhart	Gino Padula	
Stefani Miglioranzi	Robbie Rogers	
Adam Moffat		
Pat Noonan		
Stanley Nyazamba		
Duncan Oughton		
Andrew Peterson		
Ricardo Pierre-Louis		
Brian Plotkin		
Kenny Schoeni		

=== DC United ===
Exposed	Protected	Exempt
Jeff Carroll	Marc Burch	
Pat Carroll	Luciano Emilio	
Ryan Cordeiro	Fred	
Louis Crayton	Iván Guerrero	
Francis Doe	Greg Janicki	
Rod Dyachenko	Thabiso Khumalo	
Marcelo Gallardo	Devon McTavish	
Quavas Kirk	Jaime Moreno	
Ibrahim Koroma	Bryan Namoff	
Gonzalo Martínez	Santino Quaranta	
Domenic Mediate	Clyde Simms	
Ryan Miller		
Ben Olsen		
Gonzalo Peralta		
Craig Thompson		
James Thorpe		
Joe Vide		
Zach Wells		
Mike Zaher		

=== FC Dallas ===
Exposed	Protected	Exempt
Ray Burse	Kenny Cooper	Eric Avila
Andrew Daniels	Jeff Cunningham	Bruno Guarda
Duilio Davino	Dax McCarty	Josh Lambo
Michael Dello-Russo	Drew Moor	Brek Shea
Aaron Pitchkolan	Dominic Oduro	Anthony Wallace
Jeff Rowland	Pablo Ricchetti	
Victor Sikora	André Rocha	
Spencer Wadsworth	Darío Sala	
David Wagenfuhr	Marcelo Saragosa	
Jamie Watson	Adrian Serioux	
Chase Wileman	Blake Wagner	

=== Houston Dynamo ===
Exposed	Protected	Exempt
Johnny Alcaraz	Bobby Boswell	
Corey Ashe	Geoff Cameron	
Wade Barrett	Brian Ching	
Kyle Brown	Ricardo Clark	
Tony Caig	Brad Davis	
Mike Chabala	Dwayne De Rosario	
Nick Hatzke	Stuart Holden	
John Michael Hayden	Kei Kamara	
Patrick Ianni	Guy-Roland Kpene	
Nate Jaqua	Brian Mullan	
Richard Mulrooney	Eddie Robinson	
Pat Onstad		
Erik Ustruck		
Craig Waibel		
Corbin Waller		
Chris Wondolowski		
Stephen Wondolowski		

=== Kansas City Wizards ===
Exposed	Protected	Exempt
Kevin Hartman	Davy Arnaud	Roger Espinoza
Aaron Hohlbein	Jimmy Conrad	Chance Myers
Michael Kraus	Adam Cristman	
Eric Kronberg	Herculez Gomez	
Matt Marquess	Michael Harrington	
Rauwshan McKenzie	Jack Jewsbury	
Kurt Morsink	Jon Leathers	
Boris Pardo	Claudio López	
Iván Trujillo	Carlos Marinelli	
Nelson Pizarro	Kevin Souter	
Ryan Pore	Josh Wolff	
Abe Thompson		
Tyson Wahl		
Lance Watson		

=== Los Angeles Galaxy ===
Exposed	Protected	Exempt
Vardan Adzemian	David Beckham	Tristan Bowen
Charles Alamo	Edson Buddle	Israel Sesay
Ely Allen	Landon Donovan	
Jeremy Barlow	Sean Franklin	
Steve Cronin	Alan Gordon	
Eduardo Dominguez	Ante Jazic	
Joe Franchino	Bryan Jordan	
Michael Gavin	Eddie Lewis	
Jovan Kirovski	Brandon McDonald	
Chris Klein	Álvaro Pires	
Mike Munoz	Troy Roberts	
Mike Randolph		
Josh Saunders		
Josh Tudela		
Peter Vagenas		
Julian Valentin		
Josh Wicks		

=== New England Revolution ===
Exposed	Protected	Exempt
José Angulo	Chris Albright	Amaechi Igwe
Gabriel Badilla	Kheli Dube	Rob Valentino
Sam Brill	Jay Heaps	
Mauricio Castro	Shalrie Joseph	
Argenis Fernández	Jeff Larentowicz	
Gary Flood	Kenny Mansally	
Joe Germanese	Sainey Nyassi	
Brad Knighton	Michael Parkhurst	
Brandon Manzonelli	Steve Ralston	
Pat Phelan	Matt Reis	
Khano Smith	Taylor Twellman	
Wells Thompson		
Chris Tierney		
Brandon Tyler		
Doug Warren		

=== New York Red Bulls ===
Exposed	Protected	Exempt
Danleigh Borman	Juan Pablo Ángel	
Terry Boss	Danny Cepero	
Andrew Boyens	Jon Conway	
Gabriel Cichero	Kevin Goldthwaite	
Óscar Echeverry	Macoumba Kandji	
John Gilkerson	Dane Richards	
Diego Jimenez	Jorge Rojas	
Gordon Kljestan	Luke Sassano	
Chris Leitch	Seth Stammler	
Mike Magee	Siniša Ubiparipović	
Matthew Mbuta	Dave van den Bergh	
Carlos Mendes		
Mike Palacio		
Jeff Parke		
Caleb Patterson-Sewell		
Juan Pietravallo		
David Roth		
Sainey Touray		
John Wolyniec		

=== Real Salt Lake ===
Exposed	Protected	Exempt
Nikolas Besagno	Kyle Beckerman	Tony Beltran
Kenny Cutler	Nat Borchers	Alex Nimo
Kenny Deuchar	Fabián Espíndola	Chris Seitz
David Horst	Robbie Findley	
Ian Joy	Will Johnson	
Dustin Kirby	Javier Morales	
Dema Kovalenko	Yura Movsisyan	
Clint Mathis	Jámison Olave	
Tino Núñez	Nick Rimando	
Kevin Reiman	Robbie Russell	
Kyle Reynish	Chris Wingert	
Nathan Sturgis		
Brennan Tennelle		
Andy Williams		

=== San Jose Earthquakes ===
Exposed	Protected	Exempt
Mikel Arce	Arturo Alvarez	
Jay Ayres	Joe Cannon	
John Cunliffe	Ryan Cochrane	
Eric Denton	Ramiro Corrales	
Gavin Glinton	Nick Garcia	
Ned Grabavoy	Jason Hernandez	
Kelly Gray	Darren Huckerby	
Michael Gustavson	Ryan Johnson	
Matt Hatzke	Francisco Lima	
Amir Lowery	Shea Salinas	
Ronnie O'Brien	Scott Sealy	
James Riley		
Jamil Roberts		
Adam Smarte		
Davide Somma		
Sina Shabany		

=== Toronto FC ===
Exposed	Protected	Exempt
Nana Attakora	Chad Barrett	Fuad Ibrahim
Kilian Elkinson	Jim Brennan	
Hunter Freeman	Danny Dichio	
Gabe Gala	Todd Dunivant	
Derek Gaudet	Brian Edwards	
Joey Melo	Amado Guevara	
Rohan Ricketts	Kevin Harmse	
Tyler Rosenlund	Julius James	
Carlos Ruiz	Tyrone Marshall	
Jarrod Smith	Carl Robinson	
Johann Smith	Marvell Wynne	
Greg Sutton		
Marco Vélez		
