= Nathan Sturgis =

American soccer player (born 1987)

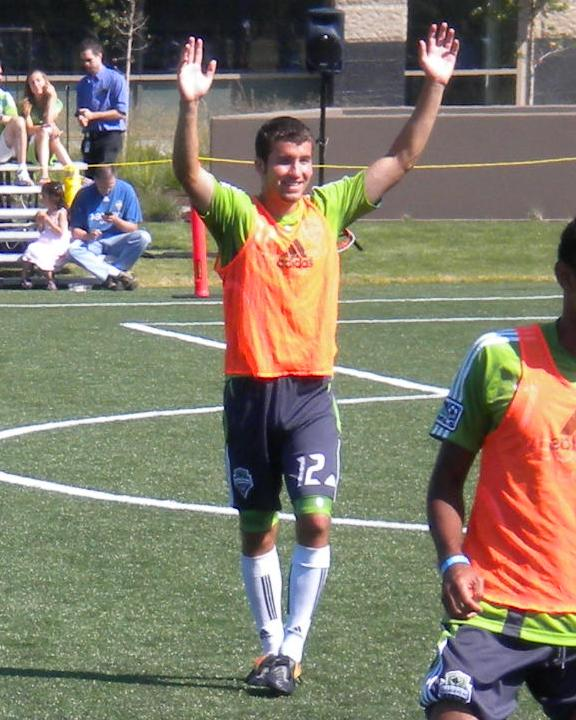

Personal information
- Full name: Nathan Radford Sturgis
- Date of birth: July 6, 1987 (age 39)
- Place of birth: St. Augustine, Florida, United States
- Height: 5 ft 10 in (1.78 m)
- Positions: Defender; midfielder

Youth career
- 2003–2004: IMG Soccer Academy

College career
Years	Team	Apps	(Gls)
2004–2005	Clemson Tigers	42	(5)

Senior career*
Years	Team	Apps	(Gls)
2004	Ajax Orlando Prospects	1	(0)
2006–2007	LA Galaxy	24	(0)
2007–2008	Real Salt Lake	8	(0)
2009–2010	Seattle Sounders FC	29	(1)
2011	Toronto FC	14	(0)
2012	Houston Dynamo	5	(0)
2013–2014	Colorado Rapids	31	(4)
2014	Chivas USA	16	(0)
2015	Houston Dynamo	18	(1)
2016	Seattle Sounders FC	0	(0)
2016	→ Seattle Sounders FC 2 (loan)	5	(0)

International career^{‡}
2003–2004	United States U17	6	(1)
2004	United States U18	1	(0)
2004–2007	United States U20	27	(0)
2008	United States U23	4	(0)
- * Club domestic league appearances and goals as of May 23, 2016 ‡ National team caps and goals as of December 20, 2014

Nathan Radford Sturgis (born July 6, 1987) is an American former soccer player who last played for Seattle Sounders FC in Major League Soccer.

== Career ==
=== Youth and college ===
Sturgis attended Nease High School, played club soccer with the First Coast KYX, and played two years of college soccer at Clemson University. In his freshman season in 2004, Sturgis scored three goals and was named to the ACC All-Freshman Team. As a sophomore, Sturgis scored two goals and added seven assists in leading the Tigers to the College Cup. Sturgis was named 3rd Team All-American and ACC Defensive Player of the Year in 2005. Sturgis also played one year with the Ajax Orlando Prospects in the USL Premier Development League

=== Professional ===
Sturgis signed a Generation Adidas contract with MLS, and was taken 12th overall in the 2006 MLS SuperDraft by the Los Angeles Galaxy. During Galaxy's pre-season tour of England in 2006 they competed against several high-profile clubs, including (then) English Premiership Champions Chelsea, and Sturgis was picked out by the staff at Chelsea and other English teams as the outstanding player of the tour. On June 21, 2007, Sturgis was traded, along with forward Robbie Findley, to Real Salt Lake in exchange for veteran midfielder Chris Klein.

On November 26, 2008, he was selected by Seattle Sounders FC in the second round of the 2008 MLS Expansion Draft. On September 18, 2010, Sturgis scored his first professional goal in a 4–0 win at Columbus against the Columbus Crew. His goal came from the penalty spot.

On November 24, 2010, Sturgis was selected by Vancouver Whitecaps FC in the third round of the 2010 MLS Expansion Draft. The next day Nathan was traded by Vancouver to Toronto FC in exchange for a first-round pick in the 2011 MLS SuperDraft.

Sturgis made his debut for Toronto on March 19, 2011, vs. Vancouver in the first-ever all-Canadian MLS match-up, it ended as a 4–2 away loss for Toronto.

On December 28, 2011, Sturgis was traded to Houston Dynamo in exchange for a conditional 2014 MLS SuperDraft pick.

On December 22, 2012, Sturgis was once again on the move when he was traded to Colorado Rapids as part of a deal involving Omar Cummings and allocation money.

After 18 months with Colorado, Sturgis was traded to Chivas USA on July 1, 2014, in exchange for Carlos Alvarez. At the conclusion of the 2014 season, MLS contracted the Chivas USA franchise. Sturgis was available to other clubs in the 2014 MLS Dispersal Draft but was not selected. He then entered the 2014 MLS Re-Entry Draft and was selected by Houston Dynamo in stage two of the draft held on December 18, 2014.

Sturgis returned to Seattle Sounders FC on February 23, 2016, when it was announced that he had signed with them as a free agent. His option was declined on December 12, 2016, making him a free agent.

=== International ===
Sturgis has played for various youth United States national teams, and was part of the Under-20 team at the 2005 World Youth Championship and the 2007 FIFA U-20 World Cup. On July 17, 2008, he was named to the U.S. team that participated in the 2008 Beijing Olympics; however, he was ruled out shortly afterwards due to a hamstring injury.

== Career statistics ==
As of December 20, 2014.

Club performance			League		League Cup		Cup		Continental		Total	
Season	Club	League	Apps	Goals	Apps	Goals	Apps	Goals	Apps	Goals	Apps	Goals
USA			League		Playoffs		Open Cup		CONCACAF		Total	
2004	Ajax Orlando Prospects	PDL	1	0	0	0	0	0	0	0	1	0
2006	Los Angeles Galaxy	Major League Soccer	15	0	0	0	0	0	0	0	15	0
2007	Los Angeles Galaxy	Major League Soccer	9	0	0	0	0	0	0	0	9	0
2007	Real Salt Lake	Major League Soccer	5	0	0	0	0	0	0	0	5	0
2008	Real Salt Lake	Major League Soccer	3	0	0	0	0	0	0	0	3	0
2009	Seattle Sounders FC	Major League Soccer	9	0	0	0	4	0	0	0	13	0
2010	Seattle Sounders FC	Major League Soccer	20	1	2	0	5	0	0	0	27	1
Canada			League		Playoffs		Canadian Cup		CONCACAF		Total	
2011	Toronto FC	Major League Soccer	14	0	0	0	1	0	0	0	15	0
USA			League		Playoffs		Open Cup		CONCACAF		Total	
2012	Houston Dynamo	Major League Soccer	5	0	0	0					5	0
2013	Colorado Rapids	Major League Soccer	25	4	1	0			0	0	26	4
2014	Colorado Rapids	Major League Soccer	6	0	0	0			0	0	6	0
2014	Chivas USA	Major League Soccer	16	0	0	0			0	0	16	0
Career totals			128	5	3	0	10	0	0	0	141	5

== Honors ==
=== Club ===
Seattle Sounders FC

- Lamar Hunt U.S. Open Cup (2): 2009, 2010

Toronto FC

- Canadian Championship (1): 2011

== Personal life ==
Sturgis' younger brother, Caleb, is a place kicker who is currently a free agent in the National Football League. His father, Smiley Sturgis, is a pastor.
