= Jarrod Smith =

New Zealand footballer

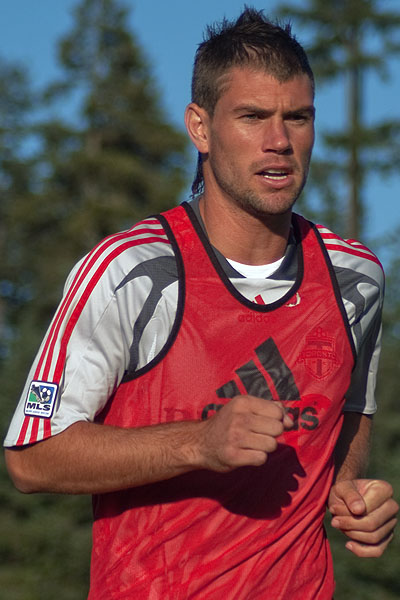

Personal information
- Full name: Jarrod Brian Stockley Smith
- Date of birth: 20 June 1984 (age 42)
- Place of birth: Havelock North, New Zealand
- Height: 1.85 m (6 ft 1 in)
- Position: Forward

College career
Years	Team	Apps	(Gls)
2003–2006	West Virginia Mountaineers	74	(32)

Senior career*
Years	Team	Apps	(Gls)
2003	Boulder Rapids Reserve	14	(9)
2007	Crystal Palace Baltimore	0	(0)
2007	→ Hawke's Bay United (loan)	9	(2)
2008	Toronto FC	20	(1)
2009	Seattle Sounders FC	0	(0)
2010–2011	Hawke's Bay United	11	(5)
2011	Ljungskile SK	1	(0)
2012–2014	Hawke's Bay United	4	(5)
2014–2015	Team Wellington	15	(6)
2015	Glenfield Rovers		
2016	Forrest Hill Milford United		
2017–2018	Birkenhead United		

International career
- New Zealand U20
- New Zealand U23
2006–2009	New Zealand	12	(0)
- * Club domestic league appearances and goals

Jarrod Brian Stockley Smith (born 20 July 1984) is a New Zealand professional footballer.

== Career ==
=== College ===
Smith moved to the United States after he was recruited by and played three seasons for former West Virginia University head coach Michael Seabolt and played for the Mountaineers in the 2005 and 2006 NCAA Men's Soccer Championship tournaments. He played as a striker and as a winger for WVU. In four seasons with the Mountaineers, Smith scored 32 goals in 74 matches. As a senior in 2006, he scored a career high 14 goals in only 16 matches under first-year coach Marlon LeBlanc.

== Professional ==
On 18 January 2007, Smith was selected by Toronto FC with the first pick in the 2007 MLS Supplemental Draft, but signed for Crystal Palace Baltimore in August 2007. In March 2008 the player was included on Toronto FC's website as an active member of the roster. He made MLS debut for Toronto playing against Los Angeles Galaxy on 13 April 2008, and scored his team's second goal en route to a 3–2 victory.

On 26 November of that year, Smith was selected by Seattle Sounders FC in the fourth round of the 2008 MLS Expansion Draft. On 1 July, Smith made his debut with the Sounders in a U.S. Open Cup match against USL side Portland Timbers. On 17 July, he was released without making a league appearance for the club. Smith joined Hawke's Bay United for 2010-2011 ASB Premiership season.

Smith signed with Swedish Superettan club Ljungskile SK at the beginning of the 2011 season, but due to injury only made one league appearance for the club. He scored his only goals in Sweden in a Svenska Cupen game against Torslanda IK on 20 April 2011, where he scored two goals. Smith was released at the end of the season.

=== International ===
Smith played on New Zealand's Under-20 and under-23 teams, and was part of the New Zealand U-23 side narrowly beaten to Oceania's spot at 2004 Athens Olympics by Australia.

Smith made his debut for the New Zealand national team (All Whites) against Malaysia, on 23 February 2006. He was also a member of New Zealand's 2006 summer tour of Europe. He came off the bench in games against Hungary and Georgia, before starting against Estonia. In the final game, against Brazil, Smith entered the game as a substitute in the 60th minute. Smith was included in the 2009 FIFA Confederations Cup. As of December 2011 Smith had made 12 appearances in official full internationals without scoring.

== Statistics ==
Season	Club	Country	Competition	Apps.	Goals
2003	Boulder Rapids Reserve	United States	USL Premier Development League	-	-
2007	Crystal Palace Baltimore	United States	USL Second Division	0	0
2007	Hawke's Bay United	New Zealand	New Zealand Football Championship	9	3
2008	Toronto FC	Canada	Major League Soccer	20	1
2009	Seattle Sounders FC	United States	Major League Soccer	0	0
2011	Ljungskile SK	Sweden	Superettan	0	0
Total	Last Updated	9-21-2009		29	4

== Personal ==
Born in Havelock North, Smith is the son of former New Zealand cricketer and broadcast commentator Ian Smith and his wife Louise Smith. He attended West Virginia University with a major in sports management.
