= Jeff Parke =

American soccer player

Personal information
- Full name: Jeff Parke
- Date of birth: March 23, 1982 (age 44)
- Place of birth: Downingtown, Pennsylvania, U.S.
- Height: 6 ft 1 in (1.85 m)
- Position: Defender

Youth career
- 1999–2000: FC Delco

College career
Years	Team	Apps	(Gls)
2000–2003	Drexel Dragons	68	(7)

Senior career*
Years	Team	Apps	(Gls)
2004–2008	New York Red Bulls	132	(1)
2009	Vancouver Whitecaps	7	(0)
2010–2012	Seattle Sounders FC	78	(1)
2013	Philadelphia Union	31	(0)
2014	D.C. United	13	(0)
Total		261	(2)

International career^{‡}
2012	United States	1	(0)
- * Club domestic league appearances and goals as of December 17, 2014 ‡ National team caps and goals as of December 17, 2014

Jeff Parke (born March 23, 1982) is an American former soccer player. He played 11 seasons in Major League Soccer, appearing in over 250 matches.

== Youth ==
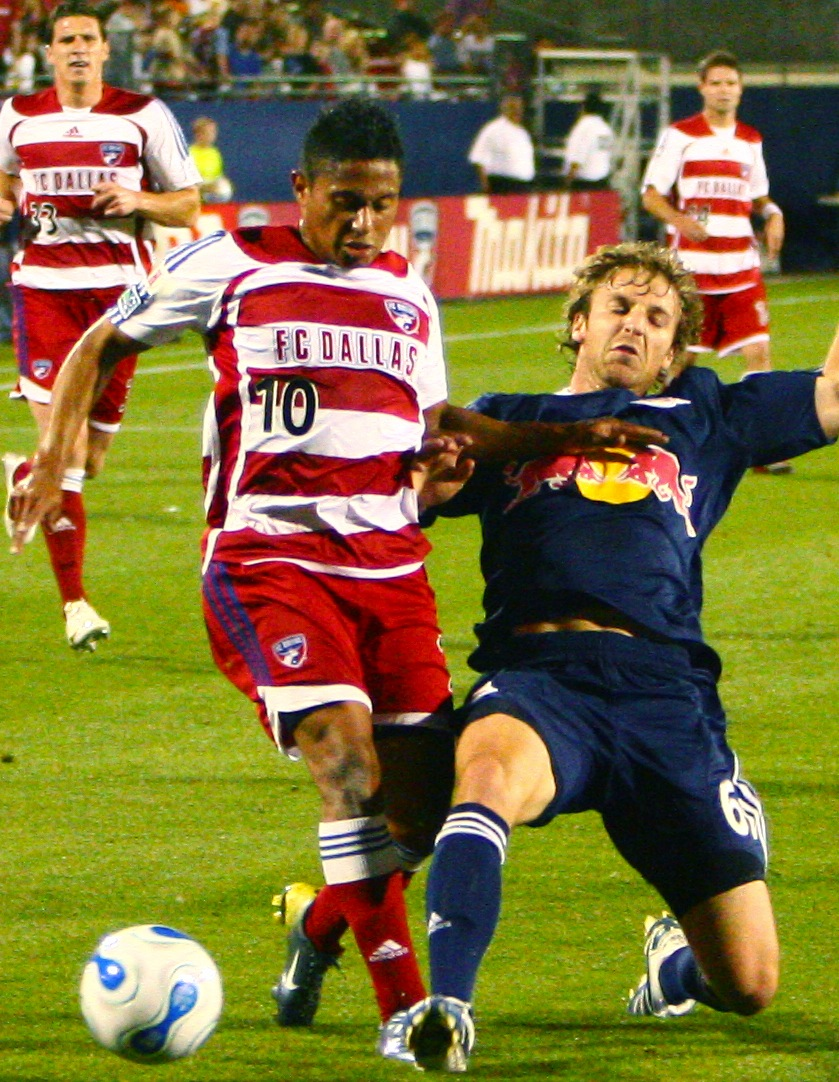
Parke with New York Red Bulls

Parke played for powerhouse youth club FC Delco. He then played four years of college soccer at Drexel University.

== Professional ==
=== New York ===
Parke was drafted by the MetroStars with 60th and last overall pick of the 2004 MLS SuperDraft. He played in the 2005 pre-season, scoring the game-winning goal against Norway's Viking FK in the 2005 La Manga Cup, which helped him earn a starting spot on the MLS team. He remained an important part of the team's defense in 2005 and 2006, quickly becoming one of the team's stalwarts on the back line. In 2006, he started a career-high 31 games, was named Red Bulls' Ironman of the Year for logging in a team-high 2,771 minutes, and was named Co-Unsung Player of the Year by members of the soccer media, sharing that honor with Seth Stammler. In 2007 Parke continued to be a fixture in the Red Bull lineup, appearing in 28 matches including 27 starts. In 2008, he appeared in 24 league matches for New York Red Bulls.

=== Other MLS clubs ===
On November 26, 2008, Parke was selected by Seattle Sounders FC in the third round of the 2008 MLS Expansion Draft, but he chose not to sign with Seattle. Instead, on March 31, 2009, Parke signed a one-year contract with the Vancouver Whitecaps of the USL First Division.

In May 2010, Parke did sign with Seattle. He remained with the club for three seasons and was voted Seattle's defender of the year in both 2011 and 2012. In December 2012, Parke was traded to his hometown side Philadelphia Union in exchange for a 2013 MLS Supplemental Draft pick and allocation money.

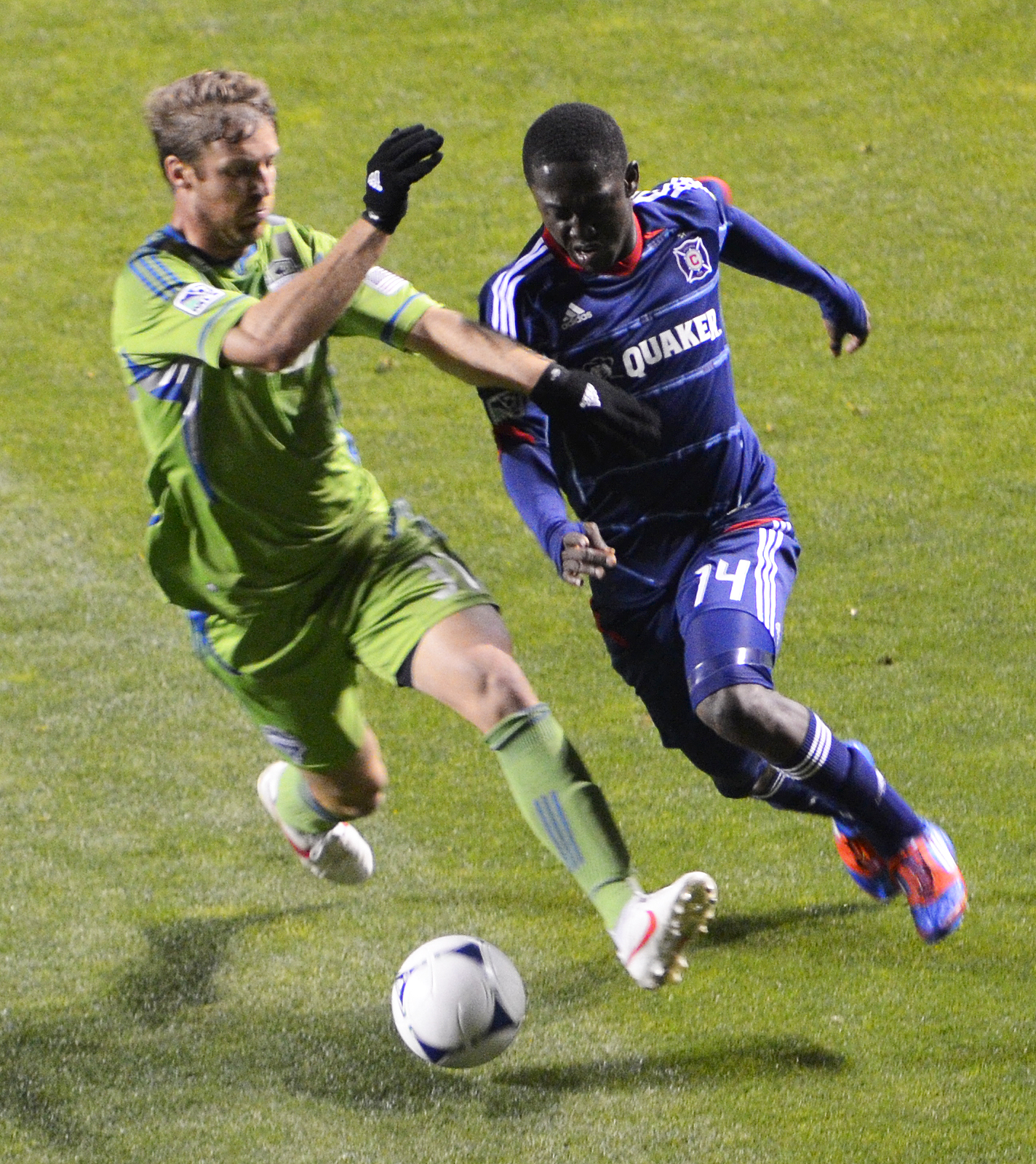
Jeff Parke of the Seattle Sounders defends against Patrick Nyarko of the Chicago Fire (April 28, 2012)

On January 14, 2014, Parke was traded to D.C. United in exchange for Ethan White. Parke played only 13 games for the club, before a combination of foot injuries and migraines requiring inner-ear surgery sidelined him for the rest of the season.

== International ==
On January 5, 2012, Parke was called into camp for the United States men's national soccer team in preparation for friendly matches against Venezuela and Panama. He made his international debut against Panama, coming on in the 55th minute for Chris Wondolowski after Geoff Cameron received a red card.

== Drug controversy ==
On October 16, 2008, Parke, along with goalkeeper Jon Conway, was suspended for 10 matches each and fined 10 percent of their annual salaries after testing positive for a banned performance-enhancing drug. Parke and Conway tested positive for androstenedione (ATD) and boldenone metabolites, two banned performance-enhancing steroids, after taking an over-the-counter supplement they purchased at The Vitamin Shoppe. The suspensions are currently the longest in MLS history.

== Career statistics ==
Club performance			League		Cup		League Cup		Continental		Total	
Season	Club	League	Apps	Goals	Apps	Goals	Apps	Goals	Apps	Goals	Apps	Goals
US			League		Open Cup		Playoffs		North America		Total	
2004	New York Red Bulls	Major League Soccer	28	1	1	0	2	0	0	0	31	1
2005	New York Red Bulls	Major League Soccer	21	0	0	0	0	0	0	0	21	0
2006	New York Red Bulls	Major League Soccer	31	0	2	0	2	0	0	0	35	0
2007	New York Red Bulls	Major League Soccer	28	0	1	0	2	0	0	0	31	0
2008	New York Red Bulls	Major League Soccer	24	0	1	0	0	0	0	0	25	0
Canada			League		Canadian Championship		League Cup		North America		Total	
2009	Vancouver Whitecaps	USL First Division	7	0	5	0	0	0	0	0	12	0
US			League		Open Cup		Playoffs		North America		Total	
2010	Seattle Sounders FC	Major League Soccer	20	0	3	0	1	0	2	0	26	0
2011	Seattle Sounders FC	Major League Soccer	28	1	3	0	2	0	4	0	37	1
2012	Seattle Sounders FC	Major League Soccer	30	0	2	0	4	0	3	0	35	0
2013	Philadelphia Union	Major League Soccer	31	0	2	0	0	0	0	0	33	0
2014	D.C. United	Major League Soccer	13	0			0	0	0	0	13	0
Total	US		254	2	15	0	13	0	9	0	291	2
Total	Canada		7	0	5	0	0	0	0	0	12	0
Career total			261	2	20	0	13	0	9	0	303	2

== Honors ==
=== New York Red Bulls ===
- Major League Soccer Western Conference Championship (1): 2008

=== Seattle Sounders FC ===
- Lamar Hunt U.S. Open Cup (2): 2010, 2011

== See also ==
- Drexel Dragons
