= Nate Jaqua =

American soccer player (born 1981)

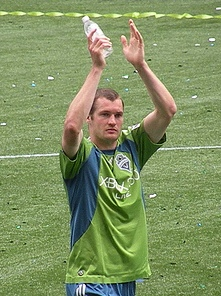
- Jaqua with Seattle Sounders FC in 2009

Personal information
- Full name: Jonathan Jaqua
- Date of birth: October 28, 1981 (age 44)
- Place of birth: Eugene, Oregon, United States
- Height: 6 ft 3 in (1.91 m)
- Position: Forward

College career
| Years | Team | Apps | (Gls) |
| 2000–2002 | Portland Pilots | 59 | (29) |

Senior career*
| Years | Team | Apps | (Gls) |
| 2003–2006 | Chicago Fire | 92 | (21) |
| 2003 | → Minnesota Thunder (loan) | 2 | (0) |
| 2007 | Los Angeles Galaxy | 10 | (1) |
| 2007 | Houston Dynamo | 15 | (6) |
| 2008 | SC Rheindorf Altach | 13 | (5) |
| 2008 | Houston Dynamo | 14 | (4) |
| 2009–2011 | Seattle Sounders FC | 66 | (9) |
| Total | | 212 | (46) |

International career^{‡}
| 2006–2008 | United States | 3 | (0) |
- * Club domestic league appearances and goals as of November 7, 2011 ‡ National team caps and goals as of March 19, 2009

Jonathan "Nate" Jaqua (born October 28, 1981, in Eugene, Oregon) is an American former soccer player.

== Career ==
=== High school ===
Jaqua is a graduate of South Eugene High School, where he led his team to two Midwestern League titles and one co-championship with North Bend in 1996. South Eugene lost to South Medford High School in the Oregon Class 4A state title in 1998. He was named a Parade All-American twice and named Oregon 4A Player of the Year twice.

=== College ===
Jaqua played college soccer at the University of Portland from 2000 to 2002. He totaled 29 goals and 22 assists in his three years there was named West Coast Conference freshman of the year.

=== Professional ===
After his 2002 season, Jaqua signed a Project-40 contract with Major League Soccer and entered the 2003 MLS SuperDraft, where he was selected third overall by Chicago Fire. Although Jaqua was expected to fill the hole in the Fire's lineup left by Josh Wolff, Damani Ralph quickly took that position, and Jaqua was relegated to a reserve role, starting only five games, scoring two goals and two assists. Although Jaqua remained blocked at forward by Ralph and Ante Razov in the 2004 season, DaMarcus Beasley's departure to PSV Eindhoven left an open spot in the Fire midfield, which Jaqua soon took. He finished the season having started 21 games for the team, while scoring four goals and two assists. Thereafter, Jaqua continued to be used as an outside midfielder from time to time, however the majority of his appearances came as a forward.

Jaqua was chosen to participate in the 2006 MLS All-Star Game, taking on Chelsea F.C. in an exhibition match at the Fire's home field, Toyota Park. Jaqua played well in the event, which the MLS side won in shocking fashion, 1–0.

After the 2006 season, Jaqua was not protected by Chicago in the 2006 MLS Expansion Draft. Expansion side Toronto FC selected Jaqua in the November 17, 2006, draft but weeks later traded him to Los Angeles Galaxy in exchange for a partial player allocation. On July 2, 2007, Los Angeles traded Jaqua to Houston Dynamo in exchange for Kelly Gray and a second-round pick in the 2008 MLS SuperDraft.

He signed with Austrian side SC Rheindorf Altach on January 28, 2008, but was released despite performing well with the club. On July 13, 2008, he re-signed with Houston Dynamo. However, on November 26 of that year, he was selected by Seattle Sounders FC in the first round of the 2008 MLS Expansion Draft.

Jaqua stayed with Seattle through the 2011 season. At season's end, the club declined his 2012 contract option and he entered the 2011 MLS Re-Entry Draft. Jaqua was selected by New England Revolution in stage two of the draft on December 12, 2011. He was offered a contract but did not sign with New England.

=== International ===
Jaqua has played for the U-18, U-20, and U-23 United States national teams. He got his first cap for the senior team on January 29, 2006, against Norway and nearly scored in the U.S. victory.

== Honors ==
=== Chicago Fire ===
- Lamar Hunt U.S. Open Cup (2): 2003, 2006
- Major League Soccer Eastern Conference Championship (1): 2003
- Major League Soccer Supporters' Shield (1): 2003

=== Houston Dynamo ===
- Major League Soccer MLS Cup (1): 2007
- Major League Soccer Western Conference Championship (1): 2007

=== Seattle Sounders FC ===
- Lamar Hunt U.S. Open Cup (3): 2009, 2010, 2011

=== Individual ===
- U.S. Open Cup Player Of The Tournament 2010

== Personal life ==
Jaqua grew up on a ranch located on the McKenzie River in Oregon. He is the son of Jon Jaqua, a former National Football League player who played for the Washington Redskins. Jaqua also has a brother Josh who played soccer at New Mexico and Portland. He said if he could not be a professional soccer player that he would be an Olympic skier. Jaqua married Violet Pham of Portland, Oregon, in 2014.
