= List of New England Revolution seasons =

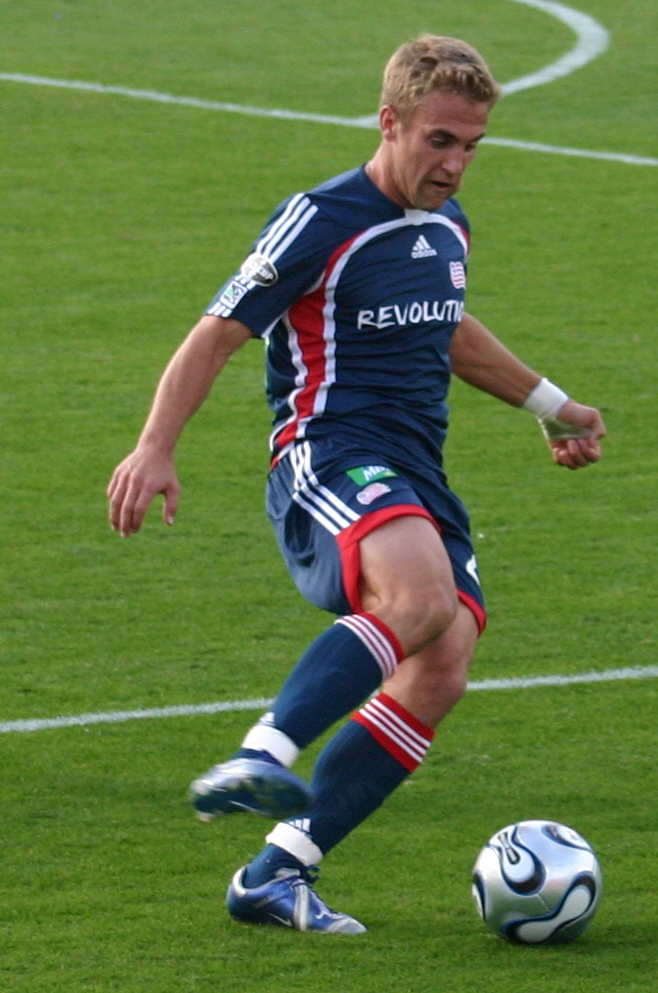
Taylor Twellman is the Revolution's all-time leading scorer with 101 league goals.

The New England Revolution is a soccer team based in Foxborough, Massachusetts, that competes in Major League Soccer (MLS), the first-division league in the United States. The club began play in 1996 as one of ten original MLS teams. The MLS regular season typically runs from February to October and the best-performing team is awarded the Supporters' Shield. The top teams from each conference qualify for the MLS Cup Playoffs, a postseason tournament that culminates in the MLS Cup.

In addition to league play, the Revolution have usually competed in the annual U.S. Open Cup tournament organized by the United States Soccer Federation. In 2023, they competed in the Leagues Cup, which was contested by teams from MLS and Liga MX of Mexico. The league and cup tournaments serve as qualifiers for the following year's CONCACAF Champions Cup (formerly the CONCACAF Champions League), an annual international competition between league and cup champions in North America, Central America, and the Caribbean. The CONCACAF Champions Cup winner then qualifies for the next FIFA Club World Cup, which is held annually but will switch to every four years beginning in 2025.

The Revolution also participated in the North American SuperLiga, a former competition between MLS and Liga MX teams that was held from 2007 to 2010. The Revolution qualified in 2008 as the runners up in the 2007 MLS Cup, and qualified in 2009 and 2010 as one of the four MLS teams with the best regular-season record out of teams not already qualified for the CONCACAF Champions Cup. In 2020, the Revolution participated in the MLS is Back Tournament, a one-time club tournament for MLS teams held during the 2020 season, which had been disrupted by the COVID-19 pandemic.

As of the end of the 2025 season, the club has played 30 seasons in MLS with 357 wins, 390 losses, and 211 draws over 958 games. The club set the record for the most points in a single season with 73 points in the 2021 season, which was broken by Inter Miami CF at the end of the 2024 season. The Revolution's best season attendance was in 2024, with an average of 29,262 spectators per game, including a sellout match against Inter Miami. Their worst season of attendance was in 2020, where they had 1,529 spectators per game, although they played 10 home games without spectators due to the COVID-19 pandemic. As of the end of the 2023 season, their worst season of attendance without COVID-19 restrictions came in 2006, in which an average of 11,786 fans attended each match.

== Key ==
Key to competitions

- Major League Soccer (MLS) – The top-flight of soccer in the United States, established in 1996.
- U.S. Open Cup (USOC) – The premier knockout cup competition in U.S. soccer, first contested in 1914 and open to all registered teams.
- Leagues Cup (LC) – An inter-league competition hosted by MLS teams against clubs from Liga MX in Mexico since 2020.
- CONCACAF Champions Cup (CCC) – The premier club competition in North and Central American soccer since 1962. It was named the Champions' Cup until 2008 and the CONCACAF Champions League from 2008 to 2023.
- MLS is Back Tournament (MiB) – A club tournament for MLS teams held once during the 2020 season, which had been disrupted by the COVID-19 pandemic.
- North American SuperLiga (SL) – A club tournament for MLS teams and Liga MX teams held four times from the 2007 season to the 2010 season.

Key to colors and symbols

| 1st or W | Winners |
| 2nd or RU | Runners-up |
| 3rd | Third place |
| Last † | Last place |
| ♦ | League top scorer |
| Italics | Ongoing competition |

Key to cup record

- DNE = Did not enter
- DNQ = Did not qualify
- NH = Competition not held or canceled
- QR2 = Qualifying round two (Note: In some years of the U.S. Open Cup, including 2010 and 2011, MLS teams participated in a play-in round to determine if they would qualify for the Open Cup.)
- QR3 = Qualifying round three
- PR = Preliminary round
- GS = Group stage
- R2 = Second round
- R3 = Third round
- R4 = Fourth round
- Ro32 = Round of 32
- Ro16 = Round of 16
- QF = Quarterfinals or Conference Semifinals
- SF = Semifinals or Conference Finals
- RU = Runners-up
- W = Winners

== Seasons ==
Results of New England Revolution league and cup competitions by season
| Season | League | | | | | | | | | Position | | Playoffs | USOC | CCC | Other | | Average attendance (Note: Average attendance is calculated from league matches only.) | Top goalscorer(s) (Note: Top goalscorer(s) includes all goals scored in the regular season, MLS Cup Playoffs, U.S. Open Cup, MLS is Back Tournament, CONCACAF Champions League, and other competitive continental matches. In years with multiple top goalscorers, they are listed in alphabetical order by last name.) | |
| Season | Pld | W | L | D | GF | GA | GD | Pts | PPG | Conf. | Overall | Playoffs | USOC | CCC | Competition | Result | Average attendance | Name(s) | Goals |
|---|---|---|---|---|---|---|---|---|---|---|---|---|---|---|---|---|---|---|---|
| 1996 | 32 | 15 | 17 | – (Note: Before the 2000 Major League Soccer season, matches would be settled in a penalty shoot-out rather than end in a draw.) | 43 | 56 | −13 | 33 | 1.03 | 5th † | 9th | DNQ | DNE | DNE | – | – | 19,025 | (United States) Joe-Max Moore | 11 |
| 1997 | 32 | 15 | 17 | – | 40 | 53 | –13 | 37 | 1.16 | 4th | 8th | QF | Ro16 | DNQ | – | – | 21,423 | (United States) Imad Baba (Argentina) Beto Naveda | 7 |
| 1998 | 32 | 11 | 21 | – | 53 | 66 | –13 | 29 | 0.91 | 6th † | 12th † | DNQ | DNE | DNQ | – | – | 19,188 | (El Salvador) Raúl Díaz Arce | 18 |
| 1999 | 32 | 12 | 20 | – | 38 | 53 | –15 | 26 | 0.81 | 5th | 8th | DNQ | DNE | DNQ | – | – | 16,735 | (United States) Joe-Max Moore | 15 |
| 2000 | 32 | 13 | 13 | 6 (Note: From 2000 to 2004, MLS discouraged draws by playing up to two 5-minute periods of golden goal overtime for tied games.) | 47 | 49 | –2 | 45 | 1.41 | 2nd | 7th | QF | R2 | DNQ | – | – | 15,463 | (Jamaica) Wolde Harris | 16 |
| 2001 (Note: The final ten games of the 2001 MLS regular season were cancelled in the wake of the September 11 attacks. This included the Revolution's final league game against the NY/NJ MetroStars.) | 27 | 7 | 14 | 6 | 35 | 52 | –17 | 27 | 1.00 | 3rd | 9th | DNQ | RU | DNQ | – | – | 16,256 | (Brazil) Catê | 8 |
| 2002 | 28 | 12 | 14 | 2 | 49 | 49 | 0 | 38 | 1.36 | 1st | 5th | RU | DNE | DNQ | – | – | 16,927 | (United States) Taylor Twellman | 25♦ (Note: Twellman was the MLS Scoring Champion (52 points).) |
| 2003 | 30 | 12 | 9 | 9 | 55 | 47 | +8 | 45 | 1.50 | 2nd | 3rd | SF | QF | Ro16 | – | – | 15,822 | (United States) Taylor Twellman | 17 |
| 2004 | 30 | 8 | 13 | 9 | 42 | 43 | –1 | 33 | 1.10 | 4th | 9th | SF | Ro16 | DNQ | – | – | 12,226 | (United States) Pat Noonan | 12♦ (Note: Noonan was the MLS Scoring Champion (30 points).) |
| 2005 | 32 | 17 | 7 | 8 | 55 | 37 | +18 | 59 | 1.84 | 1st | 2nd | RU | Ro16 | DNQ | – | – | 12,525 | (United States) Taylor Twellman | 17♦ (Note: Twellman won the MLS Golden Boot (17 goals).) |
| 2006 | 32 | 12 | 8 | 12 | 39 | 35 | +4 | 48 | 1.50 | 2nd | 3rd | RU | QF | QF | – | – | 11,786 | (United States) Taylor Twellman | 15 |
| 2007 | 30 | 14 | 8 | 8 | 51 | 43 | +8 | 50 | 1.67 | 2nd | 4th | RU | W | DNQ | – | – | 16,787 | (United States) Taylor Twellman | 23 |
| 2008 | 30 | 12 | 11 | 7 | 40 | 43 | –3 | 43 | 1.43 | 3rd | 5th | QF | SF | PR | North American SuperLiga | W | 17,580 | (United States) Taylor Twellman | 9 |
| 2009 | 30 | 11 | 10 | 9 | 33 | 37 | –4 | 42 | 1.40 | 3rd | 7th | QF | Ro16 | DNQ | North American SuperLiga | SF | 13,732 | (Grenada) Shalrie Joseph | 9 |
| 2010 | 30 | 9 | 16 | 5 | 32 | 50 | −18 | 32 | 1.07 | 7th | 13th | DNQ | QR2 | DNQ | North American SuperLiga | RU | 12,987 | (Serbia) Marko Perović | 8 |
| 2011 | 34 | 5 | 16 | 13 | 38 | 58 | –20 | 28 | 0.82 | 9th † | 17th | DNQ | QR3 | DNQ | – | – | 13,222 | (Grenada) Shalrie Joseph | 8 |
| 2012 | 34 | 9 | 17 | 8 | 39 | 44 | –5 | 35 | 1.03 | 9th | 16th | DNQ | R3 | DNQ | – | – | 14,001 | (France) Saër Sène | 11 |
| 2013 | 34 | 14 | 11 | 9 | 49 | 38 | +11 | 51 | 1.50 | 3rd | 7th | QF | QF | DNQ | – | – | 14,844 | (Uruguay) Diego Fagúndez | 13 |
| 2014 | 34 | 17 | 13 | 4 | 51 | 46 | +5 | 55 | 1.62 | 2nd | 5th | RU | QF | DNQ | – | – | 16,681 | (United States) Lee Nguyen | 18 |
| 2015 | 34 | 14 | 12 | 8 | 48 | 47 | +1 | 50 | 1.47 | 5th | 11th | R1 | R4 | DNQ | – | – | 19,627 | (United States) Charlie Davies | 10 |
| 2016 | 34 | 11 | 14 | 9 | 44 | 54 | −10 | 42 | 1.24 | 7th | 14th | DNQ | RU | DNQ | – | – | 20,185 | (United States) Juan Agudelo (Sierra Leone) Kei Kamara | 7 |
| 2017 | 34 | 13 | 15 | 6 | 53 | 61 | −8 | 45 | 1.32 | 7th | 15th | DNQ | QF | DNQ | – | – | 19,367 | (Sierra Leone) Kei Kamara | 12 |
| 2018 | 34 | 10 | 13 | 11 | 49 | 55 | −6 | 41 | 1.21 | 8th | 16th | DNQ | R4 | DNQ | – | – | 18,347 | (Ecuador) Cristian Penilla | 12 |
| 2019 | 34 | 11 | 11 | 12 | 50 | 57 | −7 | 45 | 1.32 | 7th | 14th | R1 | Ro16 | DNQ | – | – | 16,737 | (Spain) Carles Gil | 10 |
| 2020 (Note: The 2020 season was shortened due to the COVID-19 pandemic; league standings were determined using points per game due to an uneven number of matches played. The three group stage matches during the MLS is Back Tournament counted towards regular season standings, while knockout stage matches did not.) | 23 | 8 | 7 | 8 | 26 | 25 | +1 | 32 | 1.39 | 8th | 15th | SF | NH (Note: The 2020 and 2021 editions of the U.S. Open Cup were canceled due to the COVID-19 pandemic.) | DNQ | MLS is Back Tournament | Ro16 | 1,529 (Note: The Revolution played 10 home games without any fans in attendance due to the COVID-19 pandemic.) | (United States) Teal Bunbury | 8 |
| 2021 | 34 | 22 | 5 | 7 | 65 | 41 | +24 | 73 | 2.15 | 1st | 1st | QF | NH | DNQ | – | – | 12,204 (Note: The Revolution began the 2021 season with Gillette Stadium at 12% capacity. This restriction was lifted on May 29.) | (Poland) Adam Buksa | 16 |
| 2022 | 34 | 10 | 12 | 12 | 47 | 50 | –3 | 42 | 1.24 | 10th | 20th | DNQ | Ro16 | QF | – | – | 21,221 | (Poland) Adam Buksa | 11 |
| 2023 | 34 | 15 | 9 | 10 | 58 | 46 | +12 | 55 | 1.62 | 5th | 6th | QF | R4 | DNQ | Leagues Cup | Ro16 | 23,940 | (Argentina) Gustavo Bou (Spain) Carles Gil | 11 |
| 2024 | 34 | 9 | 21 | 4 | 37 | 74 | -37 | 31 | 0.91 | 14th | 26th | DNQ | DNE | QF | Leagues Cup | Ro32 | 29,262 | (Albania) Giacomo Vrioni | 12 |
| 2025 | 34 | 9 | 16 | 9 | 44 | 51 | -7 | 36 | 1.06 | 11th | 23rd | DNQ | Ro16 | DNQ | - | - | 24,477 | (Spain) Carles Gil | 10 |
| Total (as of 2025) | 958 | 357 | 390 | 211 | 1350 | 1460 | -110 | 1258 | 1.31 | W (3) | W (1) | RU (5) | W (1) | QF (3) | — | — | — | (United States) Taylor Twellman | 119 |
