= 2001 New England Revolution season =

New England Revolution
2001 season
- Owner: Robert Kraft (The Kraft Group)
- Head coach: Fernando Clavijo
- Stadium: Foxboro Stadium; Foxborough, Massachusetts
- MLS: Conference: 3rd Overall: 9th
- Open Cup: Runners-up
- Top goalscorer: League: Catê (8g); All: Catê (10g)
- Average home league attendance: 15,654
- Biggest win: 7–1 (U.S. Open Cup) 5-1 (Regular season)
- Biggest defeat: 5–0 (vs. D.C. United on May 9)

The 2001 New England Revolution season was the sixth season for the New England Revolution both as a club and in Major League Soccer (MLS). The club missed the playoffs after finishing third in the Eastern conference. The club was reached the final of the 2001 U.S. Open Cup, where they lost to the LA Galaxy.

== Summary ==
The Revolution qualified for the post-season for only the second time in its history in their 2000 campaign. Despite this, the team stumbled out of the blocks in 2001, losing six straight matches to start their 2001 campaign. In mid-May the team's fortune changed, losing only one of its next nine, recording 4 wins and 4 losses during the months of May and June. Results were mixed during the second half of the season; with the team suffering heavy defeats to San Jose, Miami, and Columbus down the stretch, ultimately failing to qualify for the playoffs.

The Revolution's fortunes fared better in the 2001 U.S. Open Cup, where the team made a run to the final, ultimately losing to the LA Galaxy in extra time.

Among the Revs’ stand-out players for 2001 were Jamaican midfielder Andy Williams, who the team added via the 2001 MLS Waiver Draft pre-season, and who was ultimately named 2001 team MVP. Brazilian playmaker Catê also joined the club pre-season from CR Flamengo. Cate would go on to lead the team in both goals and assists in 2001, receiving MLS All-Star honors in the process. 1999 MLS Rookie of the Year and Longmeadow, Massachusetts product Jay Heaps, acquired via mid-season trade, would go on to spend 9 more seasons with the club.

== Squad ==
=== First-team squad ===
As of March 4, 2025. Note: Flags indicate national team as defined under FIFA eligibility rules; some limited exceptions apply. Players may hold more than one non-FIFA nationality.

No.	Pos.	Nation	Player
1	GK	USA	Juergen Sommer
25	GK	BOL	José Carlos Fernández
26	GK	USA	Jeff Causey
3	DF	USA	Rusty Pierce
5	DF	USA	Ted Chronopoulos
8	DF	USA	Joe Franchino
19	DF	USA	Nick Downing
29	DF	CRC	Mauricio Wright
12	DF	USA	Alan Woods
6	MF	USA	Jay Heaps
7	MF	JAM	Andy Williams

No.	Pos.	Nation	Player
10	MF	BRA	Catê
14	MF	COL	Leonel Alvarez
15	MF	PLE	Shaker Asad
17	MF	USA	Braeden Cloutier
20	MF	BOL	Fernando Ortiz Solis
23	MF	USA	Tony Frias
9	FW	USA	Johnny Torres
13	FW	JAM	Wolde Harris
22	FW	USA	Yari Allnutt
33	FW	USA	Matt Okoh
77	FW	CRC	William Sunsing

== Player movement ==
New England Revolution – 2001 Transfers In
Name	Position	Date	Method	Fee	Previous club	Reference
Nick Downing	DF	February 5, 2001	2001 MLS Superdraft	N/A	Seattle Sounders Select	
Yari Allnut	MF	February 5, 2001	2001 MLS Superdraft	N/A	Rochester Rhinos	
Fernando Ortiz Solis	MF	February 5, 2001	2001 MLS Superdraft	N/A	Tahuichi Academy	
Eric Pogue	GK	February 5, 2001	2001 MLS Superdraft	N/A	Michigan Bucks	
Shaun Tsakiris	DF	February 5, 2001	2001 MLS Superdraft	N/A	UCLA	
Michael Feller	MF	February 5, 2001	2001 MLS Superdraft	N/A	University of Virginia	
Matthew Okoh	FW	March 19, 2001	Trade	N/A	Colorado Rapids	
Alan Woods	DF	March 19, 2001	Trade	N/A	Colorado Rapids	
Caté	MF	March 28, 2001	Undisclosed	Undisclosed	CR Flamengo	
Andy Williams	MF	March 29, 2001	2001 MLS Waiver Draft	N/A	Columbus Crew	
John Wolyniec	FW	May 3, 2001	Trade	N/A	Chicago Fire	
Roland Aguilera	MF	May 11, 2001	Trade	N/A	Columbus Crew	
Braeden Cloutier	MF	May 12, 2001	Waiver Claim	N/A	Charleston Battery	
Jay Heaps	DF	June 20, 2001	Trade	N/A	Miami Fusion	
José Carlos Fernandez	GK	June 27, 2001	Undisclosed	Undisclosed	Jaguares F.C.	
Tony Frias III	MF	July 19, 2001	N/A	N/A	N/A	
Leo Cullen	DF	August 16, 2001	Trade	N/A	Miami Fusion	

New England Revolution – 2001 Transfers Out
Name	Position	Date	Method	Fee	Next Club	Reference
Imad Baba	MF	March 19, 2001	Trade	N/A	Colorado Rapids	
Carlos Parra	MF	March 19, 2001	Trade	N/A	Rochester Rhinos	
Eric Wynalda	FW	May 3, 2001	Trade	N/A	Chicago Fire	
John Harkes	MF	May 11, 2001	Trade	N/A	Columbus Crew	
John Wolyniec	FW	May 12, 2001	Waivers	N/A	Rochester Rhinos	
Brian Dunseth	DF	June 20, 2001	Trade	N/A	Miami Fusion	
Roland Aguilera	MF	July 3, 2001	Loan	N/A	Oriente Petrolero	
Johnny Torres	FW	August 16, 2001	Trade	N/A	Miami Fusion	
Shaker Asad	MF	August 16, 2001	Trade	N/A	Miami Fusion	
Alan Woods	DF	November 16, 2001	Waived	N/A	Atlanta Silverbacks FC	
Matt Okoh	FW	November 16, 2001	Waived	N/A	S.C. Campomaiorense	
Roland Aguilera	MF	November 16, 2001	Waived	N/A	Virginia Beach Mariners	
Fernando Ortiz Solis	MF	November 16, 2001	Waived	N/A	N/A	

1. Acquired Matthew Okoh, Alan Woods, and a natural second-round pick in the 2002 MLS SuperDraft from the Colorado Rapids in exchange for Imad Baba and Carlos Parra.
2. Acquired John Wolyniec and third-round pick in the 2002 MLS SuperDraft from the Chicago Fire in exchange for Eric Wynalda
3 Acquired Roland Aguilera and a conditional pick in the 2002 MLS SuperDraft from the Columbus Crew in exchange for John Harkes.
4 Acquired Jay Heaps and a second-round pick in the 2003 MLS SuperDraft from the Miami Fusion in exchange for Brian Dunseth and a first-round pick in the 2003 MLS SuperDraft.
5 Acquired Leo Cullen and a first-round pick in the 2003 MLS SuperDraft from the Miami Fusion in exchange for Johnny Torres, Shaker Asad and a second-round pick in the 2003 MLS SuperDraft.

== Honors and statistical leaders ==
Adapted from 2024 Media Guide

=== League awards and honors ===
New England Revolution – 2001 League Awards
Honor	Name
MLS Player of the Week	Catê (Week 7)
MLS All-Stars	Catê

=== Team awards and honors ===
New England Revolution – 2001 Team Awards
Honor	Name
Revolution Most Valuable Player	Andy Williams
Revolution Defender of the Year	Mauricio Wright
Revolution Scoring Champion	Catê (24 pts.; 8G, 8A)
Revolution Humanitarian of the Year	Jeff Causey

=== Statistical leaders ===
New England Revolution – 2001 Statistical Leaders
Honor	Name
Games Played	Mauricio Wright
Games Started	Mauricio Wright
Minutes Played	Mauricio Wright
Goals	Catê
Assists	Catê
Shots	Catê
Shots on Goal	Catê
Fouls Committed	Leonel Álvarez

== Standings ==
Conference

Pos	Team	Pld	W	L	T	GF	GA	GD	Pts	Qualification
1	Miami Fusion	26	16	5	5	57	36	+21	53	MLS Cup Playoffs
2	MetroStars	26	13	10	3	38	35	+3	42	MLS Cup Playoffs
3	New England Revolution	27	7	14	6	35	52	−17	27	
4	D.C. United	26	8	16	2	42	50	−8	26	

Source: MLS

Overall

Pos	Team	Pld	W	L	T	GF	GA	GD	Pts	PPG	Qualification
1	Miami Fusion (S)	26	16	5	5	57	36	+21	53	2.04	CONCACAF Champions' Cup
2	Chicago Fire	27	16	6	5	50	30	+20	53	1.96	
3	Los Angeles Galaxy	26	14	7	5	52	36	+16	47	1.81	
4	Columbus Crew	26	13	7	6	49	36	+13	45	1.73	
5	San Jose Earthquakes (C)	26	13	7	6	47	29	+18	45	1.73	CONCACAF Champions' Cup
6	MetroStars	26	13	10	3	38	35	+3	42	1.62	
7	Dallas Burn	26	10	11	5	48	47	+1	35	1.35	
8	Kansas City Wizards	27	11	13	3	33	53	−20	36	1.33	
9	New England Revolution	27	7	14	6	35	52	−17	27	1.00	
10	D.C. United	26	8	16	2	42	50	−8	26	1.00	
11	Colorado Rapids	26	5	13	8	36	47	−11	23	0.88	
12	Tampa Bay Mutiny	27	4	21	2	32	68	−36	14	0.52	

Source: MLS
Rules for classification: 1) points per game; 2) total goal differential per match played; 3) total goals scored per match played; 4) away record; 5) away goal differential; 6) total goals scored in away matches; 7) home record; 8) home goal differential; 9) total goals scored in home matches; 10) fewest disciplinary points per match played; 6) away goal differential per away match played; 11) coin toss or drawing of lots.
(C) Champion; (S) Supporters' Shield

== Results ==
=== Pre-season friendlies ===
February 17, 2001	San Lorenzo	1–2	New England Revolution	Heredia, Costa Rica
	Jefry Espinoza 27'	Press Release	Wolde Harris 5'; Brian Dunseth 50'	Stadium: Heredia Stadium

=== Regular season ===
April 7, 2001 1	MetroStars	2–1	New England Revolution	East Rutherford, New Jersey
	Alex Comas (yellow card) 28'; Tab Ramos (yellow card) 33'; Clint Mathis (yellow card) 43' (goal) 61'; Daniel Hernández (yellow card) 80'; Adolfo Valencia 90+2'; Pedro Álvarez (yellow card) 90+4'	Report	William Sunsing (yellow card) 45'; Joe Franchino (yellow card) 45+4'; Leonel Álvarez (yellow card) 60' (goal) 73'	Stadium: Giants Stadium; Attendance: 30,753; Referee: Ricardo Valenzuela

April 14, 2001 2	New England Revolution	0–1	Miami Fusion	Foxborough, Massachusetts
	Joe Franchino (yellow card) 15'; Brian Dunseth (yellow card) 22'; Leonel Álvarez (yellow card) 59'; Eric Wynalda (yellow card) 77'; Matt Okoh (yellow card) 90+1'	Report	Diego Serna (yellow card) 15' (red card); Ivan McKinley (yellow card) 39'; Carlos Llamosa (yellow card) 40' (red card); Tyrone Marshall 55'; Jim Rooney (yellow card) 56'; Jeff Bilyk (yellow card) 88'	Stadium: Foxboro Stadium; Attendance: 15,576; Referee: Brian Hall

April 21, 2001 3	D.C. United	2–1	New England Revolution	Washington, D.C.
	Abdul Thompson Conteh 9' 61'; Carey Talley (penalty missed)	Report	Wolde Harris (penalty missed); Matt Okoh 49'; John Harkes (yellow card) 51'; Johnny Torres (yellow card) 62'; Rusty Pierce (yellow card) 85'	Stadium: Robert F. Kennedy Memorial Stadium; Attendance: 15,656; Referee: Michael Kennedy

April 28, 2001 4	Miami Fusion	1–0	New England Revolution	Fort Lauderdale, Florida
	Ivan McKinley (yellow card) 31'; Carlos Llamosa (yellow card) 65'; Tyrone Marshall (yellow card) 71'; Alex Pineda Chacón 80'; Pablo Mastroeni (yellow card) 89'	Report	Mauricio Wright (yellow card) 80'; Matt Okoh (yellow card) 87'	Stadium: Lockhart Stadium; Attendance: 14,381; Referee: Tim Weyland

May 5, 2001 5	San Jose Earthquakes	3–2	New England Revolution	San Jose, California
	Troy Dayak 28'; Dwayne De Rosario 72' (yellow card) 90+2'; Zak Ibsen 80'	Report	Matt Okoh (yellow card) 25'; Johnny Torres (yellow card) 66'; Rusty Pierce (yellow card) 85'; Mauricio Wright 88'; Johnny Torres (penalty missed); Wade Barrett (o.g.)	Stadium: Spartan Stadium; Attendance: 8,137; Referee: Alex Prus

May 9, 2001 6	D.C. United	5–0	New England Revolution	Washington, D.C.
	Abdul Thompson Conteh 5' 34' 44' 48'; Carey Talley 40'; Ryan Nelsen (yellow card) 58'	Report	Johnny Torres (yellow card) 41'; Joe Franchino (yellow card) 48'; John Wolyniec (yellow card) 81'	Stadium: Robert F. Kennedy Memorial Stadium; Attendance: 10,638; Referee: Richard Heron

May 12, 2001 7	New England Revolution	2–1	Chicago Fire FC	Foxborough, Massachusetts
	Braeden Cloutier (yellow card) 15'; Catê (penalty scored); Ted Chronopoulos (yellow card) 53'; Joe Franchino (yellow card) 80'; Matt Okoh 81'	Report	Jesse Marsch (yellow card) 31'; C.J. Brown (yellow card) 35'; Piotr Nowak 62'	Stadium: Foxboro Stadium; Attendance: 15,159; Referee: Sergio Vega

May 16, 2001 8	New England Revolution	2–1	Columbus Crew	Foxborough, Massachusetts
	Braeden Cloutier (yellow card) 24'; Catê 69' 83'	Report	Edson Buddle 74'; John Wilmar Pérez (yellow card) 90+2'	Stadium: Foxboro Stadium; Attendance: 7,864; Referee: Alex Prus

May 19, 2001 9	Colorado Rapids	0–1	New England Revolution	Denver, Colorado
	Imad Baba (yellow card) 15'; Jason More (yellow card) 83'	Report	Matt Okoh 86'	Stadium: Mile High Stadium; Attendance: 20,005; Referee: Kevin Terry

May 26, 2001 10	LA Galaxy	2–1	New England Revolution	Pasadena, California
	Luis Hernández (yellow card) 53'; Adam Frye (yellow card) 53'; Ezra Hendrickson 77'; Danny Califf (yellow card) 83'; Cobi Jones 88'	Report	Joe Franchino (yellow card) 53'; Catê (yellow card) 75'	Stadium: Rose Bowl; Attendance: 12,249; Referee: Gerry Corrie

June 3, 2001 11	New England Revolution	1–1	MetroStars	Foxborough, Massachusetts
	Leonel Alvarez (yellow card) 33'; Cate 90+1'; Johnny Torres (yellow card) 90+1'; Mauricio Wright (yellow card) 100'	Report	Pedro Alvarez (yellow card) 38' (red card); Clint Mathis (yellow card) 80'; Richie Williams (yellow card) 90'; Steve Jolley (yellow card) 90'	Stadium: Foxboro Stadium; Attendance: 28,623; Referee: Kevin Terry

June 9, 2001 12	New England Revolution	3–0	Tampa Bay Mutiny	Foxborough, Massachusetts
	Wolde Harris 21' 32'; Johnny Torres (yellow card) 29' (goal) 64'; Joe Franchino (yellow card) 31'	Report	Josh Keller (yellow card) 9'; Joe Addo (yellow card) 24'; Gus Kartes (yellow card) 43'	Stadium: Foxboro Stadium; Attendance: 15,368; Referee: Rich Grady

June 20, 2001 13	New England Revolution	3–3	Colorado Rapids	Foxborough, Massachusetts
	Johnny Torres 26'; Ted Chronopoulos 71'; Rusty Pierce (yellow card) 81'; Shaker Asad 88'	Report	Chris Carrieri 9'; John Spencer 20'; Paul Bravo (yellow card) 29'; Paul Bravo 90+2'	Stadium: Foxboro Stadium; Attendance: 31,211; Referee: Reggie Rutty

June 23, 2001 14	Chicago Fire FC	1–1	New England Revolution	Chicago, Illinois
	Sergi Daniv (yellow card) 65'; Dema Kovalenko 73'	Report	Joe Franchino (yellow card) 13'; Braeden Cloutier (yellow card) 54'; Cate 59'; Wolde Harris (yellow card) 72'; Jay Heaps (yellow card) 97'	Stadium: Soldier Field; Attendance: 20,531; Referee: Paul Tamberino

July 4, 2001 15	Dallas Burn	1–1	New England Revolution	Dallas, Texas
	Chris Deering (yellow card) 68'; Eric Dade (yellow card) 86'; Ariel Graziani (yellow card) 88'; Eddie Johnson 90+5'	Report	Cate 29'; Joe Franchino (yellow card) 56'; Shaker Asad (yellow card) 80'; Mauricio Wright (yellow card) 91'	Stadium: Cotton Bowl; Attendance: 21,343; Referee: Rich Grady

July 7, 2001 16	New England Revolution	1–2	Kansas City Wizards	Foxborough, Massachusetts
	Shaker Asad (yellow card) 37'; Mauricio Wright (yellow card) 90' (goal) 90+3'	Report	Gary Glasgow (yellow card) 27'; Chris Klein 66'; Mike Burns (yellow card) 69'; Chris Brown 90+1'	Stadium: Foxboro Stadium; Attendance: 13,141; Referee: Alex Prus

July 14, 2001 17	New England Revolution	1–3	D.C. United	Foxborough, Massachusetts
	Shaker Asad (yellow card) 42'; Andy Williams (yellow card) 71'; William Sunsing 87'	Report	Santino Quaranta 5' 90+4'; Carey Talley (yellow card) 16'; Scott Vermillion (yellow card) 45+2'; Eddie Pope (yellow card) 69'; & Jaime Moreno 71'	Stadium: Foxboro Stadium; Attendance: 14,691; Referee: Ricardo Valanzuela

July 17, 2001 18	New England Revolution	3–2	LA Galaxy	Foxborough, Massachusetts
	Wolde Harris 7'; William Sunsing 32'; Andy Williams 51'	Report	Luis Hernandez 28' 40'; Danny Califf (yellow card) 49'; Craig Waibel (yellow card) 70'; Ezra Hendrickson (yellow card) 90+2'	Stadium: Foxboro Stadium; Attendance: 12,391; Referee: Noel Kenny

July 21, 2001 19	Miami Fusion	1–1	New England Revolution	Fort Lauderdale, Florida
	Jim Rooney 42'	Report	Jay Heaps (yellow card) 29'; Andy Williams 54'	Stadium: Lockhart Stadium; Attendance: 6,123; Referee: Paul Tamberino

July 29, 2001 20	Kansas City	2–0	New England Revolution	Kansas City, Missouri
	Mark Santel 21'; Matt McKeon (yellow card) 38'; Gary Glasgow 65'	Report	Matt Okoh (yellow card) 78'	Stadium: Arrowhead Stadium; Attendance: 6,071; Referee: Terry Vaughn

August 4, 2001 21	New England Revolution	5–1	Dallas Burn	Foxborough, Massachusetts
	William Sunsing 9'; Rusty Pierce (yellow card) 15'; Joe Franchino (yellow card) 25'; Ted Chronopoulos 45+4' 81'; Matt Okoh (yellow card) 73' (goal) 76'; Catê 79'; Alan Woods (yellow card) 89'	Report	Ariel Graziani (yellow card) 14'; Justin Evans (yellow card) 38' (red card); Aleksey Korol 86'	Stadium: Foxboro Stadium; Attendance: 10,326; Referee: Tim Weyland

August 8, 2001 22	New England Revolution	1–5	San Jose Earthquakes	Foxborough, Massachusetts
	Yari Allnutt (yellow card) 22'; Mauricio Wright (red card); Catê 44' (red card); Leonel Álvarez (yellow card) 55'	Report	Ramiro Corrales (yellow card) 34' (red card); Landon Donovan 35' 39'; Junior Agogo 68' 80'; Manny Lagos 71'	Stadium: Foxboro Stadium; Attendance: 11,822; Referee: Kevin Terry

August 11, 2001 23	New England Revolution	1–4	Miami Fusion	Foxborough, Massachusetts
	Matt Okoh 6'; Joe Franchino (yellow card) 14'; Jay Heaps (yellow card) 48'; Rusty Pierce (yellow card) 90'	Report	Pablo Mastroeni (yellow card) 6'; Jeff Bilyk (yellow card) 10'; Alex Pineda Chacón 16'; Diego Serna (yellow card) 24' (goal) 68'; Preki 27'; Chris Henderson 35'; Brian Dunseth (yellow card) 44'	Stadium: Foxboro Stadium; Attendance: 12,003; Referee: Alex Prus

August 18, 2001 24	New England Revolution	2–1	D.C. United	Foxborough, Massachusetts
	Ted Chronopoulos 9' 30'; Jay Heaps (yellow card) 12'	Report	Stephen Armstrong 32'; Jaime Moreno (yellow card) 34'; Eddie Pope (yellow card) 44'; Abdul Thompson Conteh (yellow card) 58'; Brian Kamler (yellow card) 69'; Ryan Nelsen (yellow card) 86'; Carey Talley (red card)	Stadium: Foxboro Stadium; Attendance: 15,226; Referee: Terry Vaughn

August 26, 2001 25	Tampa Bay Mutiny	0–0 (a.e.t.)	New England Revolution	Tampa, Florida
	Mamadou Diallo (penalty missed) (yellow card) 68'; Steve Trittschuh (yellow card) 42'; Eric Quill (red card); Danny Pena (yellow card) 82'; Joe Addo (yellow card) 90'	Report	Joe Franchino (red card)	Stadium: Raymond James Stadium; Attendance: 11,345; Referee: Gerry Corrie

September 1, 2001 26	Columbus Crew	4–1	New England Revolution	Columbus, Ohio
	Mike Lapper (yellow card) 12'; Robert Warzycha (yellow card) 43' (goal) 90+2'; Tenywa Bonseu (yellow card) 54'; Brian Maisonneuve 55'; Jeff Cunningham 65' 80'; Duncan Oughton (yellow card) 78'; Mario Longo (yellow card) 86'	Report	Matt Okoh 15'; Jay Heaps (yellow card) 29'; Rusty Pierce (yellow card) 30'; Yari Allnutt (yellow card) 38'; Leonel Álvarez (yellow card) 45'; Nick Downing (yellow card) 87'	Stadium: Columbus Crew Stadium; Attendance: 24,033; Referee: Ricardo Valanzuela

September 7, 2001 27	MetroStars	3–1	New England Revolution	East Rutherford, New Jersey
	Rodrigo Faria 5' 27'; Steve Jolley (yellow card) 38'; Pedro Álvarez (yellow card) 53'; Petter Villegas (yellow card) 81'	Report	Andy Williams 14'	Stadium: Giants Stadium; Attendance: 13,679; Referee: Paul Tamberino

6 The Revolution played only 27 league matches in 2001, as Major League Soccer elected to cancel the final weeks of the season following the September 11 attacks.

=== 2001 U.S. Open Cup ===
June 27, 2001 Second round	Mid Michigan Bucks (PDL)	1–7	New England Revolution (MLS)	Foxboro, Massachusetts
	Paul Snape 12'	(Report)	Shaker Asad 7'; Matt Okoh 20', 76'; Wolde Harris 36', 44'; William Sunsing 53' (pen); Cate 82'	Stadium: Foxboro Stadium; Attendance: 947; Referee: Gus St. Silva (United States)

July 11, 2001 Third round	Charleston Battery (A-League)	1–2	New England Revolution (MLS)	Foxboro, Massachusetts
	Paul Conway 25' (pen)	(Report)	Shaker Asad 19'; Johnny Torres 66'	Stadium: Foxboro Stadium; Attendance: 1,207; Referee: Robert Mann (United States)

July 24, 2001 Quarter-final	Columbus Crew (MLS)	1–2	New England Revolution (MLS)	Foxboro, Massachusetts
	John Wilmar Perez 85'	(Report)	Cate 50' (pen); William Sunsing 72'	Stadium: Foxboro Stadium; Attendance: 5,695; Referee: Ricardo Salazar (United States)

August 22, 2001 Semi-final	D.C. United (MLS)	0–2	New England Revolution (MLS)	Foxboro, Massachusetts
		(Report)	Andy Williams 9', 40'	Stadium: Foxboro Stadium; Attendance: 7,128; Referee: Brian Hall (United States)

October 27, 2001 Final	New England Revolution (MLS)	1–2 (asdet)	Los Angeles Galaxy (MLS)	Titan Stadium; Fullerton, California
	Wolde Harris 30'	(Report)	Ezra Hendrickson 70'; Danny Califf 92'	Attendance: 4,195; Referee: Paul Tamberino (United States)

== Miscellany ==
- The 2001 season was the final season the Revolution would play at Foxboro Stadium, following the opening of CMGI Field in 2002.
- The final competitive Revolution fixture at Foxboro Stadium was their August 22 2-0 victory over D.C. United in the U.S. Open Cup Semi-final.
- The 2001 season was the first season in which the Revolution wore kits manufactured by Umbro, having previously worn Reebok (1996–99) and Atletica (2000).
- The June 20th match against the Colorado Rapids was part of a double-header featuring a United States men's national soccer team v. Trinidad and Tobago national football team World Cup Qualifier. The United States won 2-0 in front of 31,211.
