= 2002 New England Revolution season =

New England Revolution
2002 season
- Owner: Robert Kraft (The Kraft Group)
- Head coach: Fernando Clavijo (until May 23, 2002); Steve Nicol (from May 23, 2002)
- Stadium: CMGI Field; Foxborough, Massachusetts
- MLS: Conference: 1st Overall: 5th
- MLS Cup Playoffs: Runners-up
- Top goalscorer: League: Taylor Twellman (23); All: Taylor Twellman (25)
- Average home league attendance: 16,927 (regular season)
- Biggest win: 4–1 (v. Columbus Crew on July 4)
- Biggest defeat: 5–2 (v. Colorado Rapids on May 22)

The 2002 New England Revolution season was the seventh season for the New England Revolution of Major League Soccer (MLS). The club reached the playoffs after finishing first in the Eastern Conference. The Revolution also reached the MLS Cup, where they lost to the LA Galaxy at home.

== Summary ==
Prior to the start of the 2002 Major League Soccer season, the Tampa Bay Mutiny and the Miami Fusion ceased operations. This resulted in drafts to disperse players from those clubs around the league. By this method the Revolution received aseveral players; including 2000 MLS Scoring Champion Mamadou Diallo, two-time MLS Best XI and two-time All-Star Steve Ralston, and 2001 MLS Best-XI defender Carlos Llamosa. The club were also able to add 2000 MLS SuperDraft third-overall pick Adin Brown. The Revolution continued to bolster its roster in the 2002 MLS SuperDraft, where they selected striker Taylor Twellman and midfielder Shalrie Joseph; both Twellman and Joseph would go on to become major figures in the club's history in the coming seasons.

The Revolution lost its first two games of the season, then recorded a draw and a win prior to its home opener, and first-ever match, at the newly completed CMGI Field; they won 2-0 in that match over the Dallas Burn, with both goals being scored by second-overall SuperDraft pick Taylor Twellman. Following a 5-2 win on May 22 against the Colorado Rapids, the Revolution parted ways with head coach Fernando Clavijo, who was replaced by Revolution assistant coach and former Liverpool F.C. player Steve Nicol on an interim basis. Nicol had previously coached the Revolution on an interim basis in 1999. Nicol's Revolution recorded their first win two days later, but struggled through the months of June and July, losing ten of fourteen matches. They closed out the regular season on a six game unbeaten stretch and finished atop of the Eastern Conference standings despite a losing record of 12–14–2.

In the MLS Cup Playoffs, New England defeated the Chicago Fire in the quarterfinals, the club's first playoff series victory. The Revolution then recorded a series victory over Columbus in the Eastern Conference Championship to advance to MLS Cup 2002, which was to be hosted at their home stadium, Gillette Stadium. An MLS Cup Playoffs record crowd of 61,316 saw the Revolution lose 1–0 to the LA Galaxy on a golden goal in the 113th minute.

After earning the MLS Coach of the Year Award, the Revolution named Nicol the permanent head coach of the team on November 6.

== Roster ==
=== Players ===
As of August 6, 2002. Note: Flags indicate national team as defined under FIFA eligibility rules; some limited exceptions apply. Players may hold more than one non-FIFA nationality.

No.	Pos.	Nation	Player
1	GK	USA	Juergen Sommer
24	GK	USA	Adin Brown
2	DF	USA	Leo Cullen
3	DF	USA	Rusty Pierce
7	DF	USA	Daniel Hernández
8	DF	USA	Joe Franchino
12	DF	MLI	Daouda Kanté
18	DF	COL	Carlos Llamosa
19	DF	USA	Nick Downing
5	MF	USA	Brian Kamler
6	MF	USA	Jay Heaps
14	MF	USA	Steve Ralston

No.	Pos.	Nation	Player
15	MF	PLE	Shaker Asad
16	MF	USA	Jim Rooney
17	MF	USA	Braeden Cloutier
22	MF	USA	Marshall Leonard
23	MF	USA	Tony Frias
25	MF	JAM	Winston Griffiths
4	FW	USA	Ian Fuller
9	FW	COL	Diego Serna
10	FW	HON	Álex Pineda Chacón
13	FW	JAM	Wolde Harris
20	FW	USA	Taylor Twellman

=== Coaches and staff ===
New England Revolution – 2002 Coaches and Staff
Name	Title
Fernando Clavijo	Head coach
Steve Nicol	Interim Head Coach
John Murphy	Assistant Coach
Matt Driver	Interim Assistant Coach

=== Front office ===
New England Revolution – 2002 Front Office
Name	Title
Robert Kraft	Investor and Operator
Jonathan Kraft	Investor and Operator
Todd Smith	General Manager
Sunil Gulati	Managing Director, Kraft Soccer

Notes

1 Until May 23, 2002
2 Named head coach on November 6, 2002
3 Named assistant coach on June 6, 2002

=== Player transactions ===
New England Revolution – 2002 Transfers In
Name	Position	Date	Method	Fee	Previous club	Reference
Jim Rooney	MF	January 11, 2002	2002 MLS Dispersal Draft	N/A	Miami Fusion	
Álex Pineda Chacón	MF	January 11, 2002	2002 MLS Dispersal Draft	N/A	Miami Fusion	
Shaker Asad	MF	January 11, 2002	2002 MLS Dispersal Draft	N/A	Miami Fusion	
Mamadou Diallo	FW	January 11, 2002	2002 MLS Allocation Draft	N/A	Tampa Bay Mutiny	
Carlos Llamosa	DF	January 11, 2002	2002 MLS Allocation Draft	N/A	Miami Fusion	
Steve Ralston	MF	January 11, 2002	2002 MLS Allocation Draft	N/A	Tampa Bay Mutiny	
Adin Brown	GK	January 15, 2002	Free Agent	N/A	Tampa Bay Mutiny	
Taylor Twellman	FW	February 10, 2002	2002 MLS SuperDraft	N/A	TSV 1860 Munich II	
Shalrie Joseph	MF	February 10, 2002	2002 MLS SuperDraft	N/A	New York Freedom	
Derek Potteiger	MF	February 10, 2002	2002 MLS SuperDraft	N/A	Penn State Nittany Lions men's soccer	
Marshall Leonard	MF	February 10, 2002	2002 MLS SuperDraft	N/A	Virginia Cavaliers men's soccer	
Carlos Semedo	MF	April 1, 2002	Undisclosed	N/A	???	
Ian Fuller	FW	April 30, 2002	2002 MLS SuperDraft	N/A	Clemson Tigers men's soccer	
Diego Serna	FW	May 24, 2002	Trade		MetroStars	
Brian Kamler	MF	May 24, 2002	Trade		MetroStars	
Daniel Hernandez	MF	May 24, 2002	Trade		MetroStars	
Daouda Kanté	DF	July 20, 2002	Waiver Claim	N/A	D.C. United	
Winston Griffiths	MF	July 30, 2002	Waiver Claim	N/A	LA Galaxy	

New England Revolution – 2002 Transfers In
Name	Position	Date	Method	Fee	Next Club	Reference
Shaun Tsakiris	MF	April 25, 2002	Waived	N/A	Rochester Raging Rhinos	
Mamadou Diallo	FW	May 24, 2002	Traded		MetroStars	
Andy Williams	MF	May 24, 2002	Traded		MetroStars	
Ted Chronopoulos	MF	May 24, 2004	Traded		MetroStars	
Carlos Semedo	MF	July 18, 2002	Waived	N/A	???	
Scott Powers	MF	July 19, 2002	Waived	N/A	???	
Shaker Asad	MF	November 4, 2002	Waived	N/A	Atlanta Silverbacks FC	
Ian Fuller	FW	November 4, 2002	Waived	N/A	Rochester Raging Rhinos	
Juergen Sommer	GK	November 4, 2002	Waived	N/A	N/A	

Notes

1. On May 24, 2002, the Revolution traded Mamadou Diallo, Ted Chronopoulos, and Andy Williams to the MetroStars in exchange for Diego Serna, Brian Kamler, and Daniel Hernandez.

== Competitions ==
=== Major League Soccer ===
==== Standings ====
===== Conference =====
Pos	Team	Pld	W	L	T	GF	GA	GD	Pts	Qualification
1	New England Revolution	28	12	14	2	49	49	0	38	MLS Cup Playoffs
2	Columbus Crew	28	11	12	5	44	43	+1	38	MLS Cup Playoffs
3	Chicago Fire	28	11	13	4	43	38	+5	37	MLS Cup Playoffs
4	MetroStars	28	11	15	2	41	47	−6	35	
5	D.C. United	28	9	14	5	31	40	−9	32	

Source: MLS

===== Overall =====
Pos	Team	Pld	W	L	T	GF	GA	GD	Pts	Qualification
1	Los Angeles Galaxy (C, S)	28	16	9	3	44	33	+11	51	CONCACAF Champions' Cup
2	San Jose Earthquakes	28	14	11	3	45	35	+10	45	CONCACAF Champions' Cup
3	Dallas Burn	28	12	9	7	44	43	+1	43	
4	Colorado Rapids	28	13	11	4	43	48	−5	43	
5	New England Revolution	28	12	14	2	49	49	0	38	CONCACAF Champions' Cup
6	Columbus Crew	28	11	12	5	44	43	+1	38	CONCACAF Champions' Cup
7	Chicago Fire	28	11	13	4	43	38	+5	37	
8	Kansas City Wizards	28	9	10	9	37	45	−8	36	
9	MetroStars	28	11	15	2	41	47	−6	35	
10	D.C. United	28	9	14	5	31	40	−9	32	

Source: MLS
Rules for classification: 1) points; 2) head-to-head record; 3) goal difference; 4) number of goals scored
(C) Champions; (S) Supporters' Shield

== Match results ==
=== Regular season ===
March 23 1	MetroStars	3–1	New England Revolution	East Rutherford, New Jersey
	Sam Forko (yellow card) 27'; Steve Jolley (yellow card) 36'; Rodrigo Faria 53'; Carlos Llamosa (o.g.); Clint Mathis 77'	Report	Jay Heaps (yellow card) 17'; Steve Ralston (yellow card) 45+1'; Alex Pineda Chacon 50'; Andy Williams (yellow card) 83'	Stadium: Giants Stadium; Attendance: 13,234; Referee: Michael Kennedy

April 6 2	San Jose Earthquakes	2–1	New England Revolution	San Jose, California
	Manny Lagos 2'; Ronnie Ekelund 78'	Report	Mamadou Diallo 38'; Ted Chronopoulos (yellow card) 42'; Rusty Pierce (yellow card) 53'; Joe Franchino (yellow card) 79'	Stadium: Spartan Stadium; Attendance: 10,104; Referee: Kevin Terry

April 20 3	Columbus Crew	0–2	New England Revolution	Columbus, Ohio
	Mike Clark (yellow card) 35'; Brian Maisonneuve (yellow card) 50'	Report	Taylor Twelman 10'; Jim Rooney 28'; Leo Cullen (yellow card) 76'; Jay Heaps (yellow card) 84'	Stadium: Columbus Crew Stadium; Attendance: 13,493; Referee: Gerry Corrie

April 27 4	Chicago Fire	2–2	New England Revolution	Naperville, Illinois
	Pitor Nowak 18'; Sergi Daniv (yellow card) 47'; Josh Wolff (yellow card) 53'; Ante Razov 59'	Report	Taylor Twellman 2'; Steve Ralston (yellow card) 28'; Joe Franchino (yellow card) 71' (goal) 83'; Jim Rooney (red card)	Stadium: Cardinal Stadium; Attendance: 9,444; Referee: Noel Kenny

May 11 5	New England Revolution	2–0	Dallas Burn	Foxborough, Massachusetts
	Taylor Twellman 6' 40'	Report	Ryan Suarez (yellow card) 37'	Stadium: CMGI Field; Attendance: 22,006; Referee: Ricardo Salazar

May 19 6	New England Revolution	1–3	Chicago Fire	Foxborough, Massachusetts
	Taylor Twellman 64'	Report	Ante Razov 34' 54' 73'	Stadium: CMGI Field; Attendance: 36,778; Referee: Kevin Terry
Note: Part of a double-header featuring the US Men's National Team and the Netherlands.

May 22 7	Colorado Rapids	5–2	New England Revolution	Denver, Colorado
	Mark Chung 1' 31'; Chris Carrieri 34'; Chris Henderson 44' 89'	Report	Ted Chronopoulos (yellow card) 27'; Taylor Twellman 33'; Wolde Harris 59'	Stadium: Mile High Stadium; Attendance: 8,002; Referee: Jair Marrufo

May 25 8	New England Revolution	3–2	LA Galaxy	Foxborough, Massachusetts
	Taylor Twellman 11'; Steve Ralston 51'; Diego Serna 76' (yellow card) 90+1'	Report	Winston Griffiths 36'; Simon Elliot (yellow card) 79'; Carlos Ruiz 90'; Adam Frye (yellow card) 90'; Gavin Glinton (yellow card) 90'	Stadium: CMGI Field; Attendance: 15,146; Referee: Alex Prus

June 1 9	New England Revolution	0–2	San Jose Earthquakes	Foxborough, Massachusetts
	Jim Rooney (yellow card) 29'; Jay Heaps (yellow card) 40'; Wolde Harris (penalty missed)	Report	Ariel Graziani 23' 67'; Eddie Robinson (yellow card) 29'; Jimmy Conrad (yellow card) 35'; Troy Dayak (yellow card) 59'	Stadium: CMGI Field; Attendance: 21,539; Referee: Michael Kennedy

June 8 10	D.C. United	3–2	New England Revolution	Washington, D.C.
	Ryan Nelsen 40' 64'; Santino Quaranta (yellow card) 42' (goal) 44'	Report	Daniel Hernandez (yellow card) 14'; Taylor Twellman 35' 36'	Stadium: Robert F. Kennedy Memorial Stadium; Attendance: 12,988; Referee: Richard Heron

June 12 11	New England Revolution	1–2	Columbus Crew	Foxborough, Massachusetts
	Steve Ralston 11' {{yel; 100+1}}: Carlos Semedo (yellow card) 20'; Jay Heaps (yellow card) 45'; Jim Rooney (yellow card) 72'; Nick Downing (yellow card) 100+1'	Report	Daniel Torres (yellow card) 9'; Chad McCarty (yellow card) 16' (goal) 20'; Chris Leitch (yellow card) 90+2'; Edson Bubble 100+1'	Stadium: CMGI Field; Attendance: 7,701; Referee: Ricardo Salazar

June 15 12	Colorado Rapids	1–2	New England Revolution	Denver, Colorado
	Robin Fraser (yellow card) 24'; Chris Carrieri 82'	Report	Taylor Twellman 22'; Wolde Harris (yellow card) 28'; Brian Kamler 57'; Daniel Hernandez (red card)	Stadium: Mile High Stadium; Attendance: 15,125; Referee: Elias Bazakos

June 22 13	Kansas City Wizards	3–2	New England Revolution	Kansas City, Missouri
	Igor Simutenkov 22' 30'; Carey Talley 35'; Preki (yellow card) 67'; Stephen Armstrong (yellow card) 84'	Report	Jay Heaps 24'; Rusty Pierce (yellow card) 39'; Taylor Twellman 66'; Steve Ralston (yellow card) 90+2'; Jim Rooney (yellow card) 90+3'	Stadium: Arrowhead Stadium; Attendance: 8,288; Referee: Noel Kenny

June 29 14	New England Revolution	0–2	MetroStars	Foxborough, Massachusetts
	Joe Franchino (yellow card) 53'; Rusty Pierce (yellow card) 90'	Report	Mamadou Diallo 5' (red card); Andy Williams (yellow card) 12'; Clint Mathis (yellow card) 30'; Mark Lisi 85'; Craig Ziadie (yellow card) 90+2'	Stadium: CMGI Field; Attendance: 16,958; Referee: Kevin Stott

July 4 15	New England Revolution	4–1	Columbus Crew	Foxborough, Massachusetts
	Taylor Twellman 11'; Carlos Llamosa (yellow card) 22'; Steve Ralston 31' 65'; Leo Cullen 39'; Jim Rooney (yellow card) 68'	Report	Brian Dunseth (yellow card) 13'; Chad McCarty (yellow card) 18'; Brian McBride 82'	Stadium: CMGI Field; Attendance: 10,903; Referee: Alex Prus

July 6 16	New England Revolution	2–0	D.C. United	Foxborough, Massachusetts
	Ivan McKinley (yellow card) 38'; Lazo Alavanja (yellow card) 90' (red card); Brian Kamler 3'; Jay Heaps (yellow card) 23'; Steve Ralston (yellow card) 67'; Taylor Twellman 87'	Report		Stadium: CMGI Field; Attendance: 9,747; Referee: Gerry Corie

July 13 17	New England Revolution	2–4	Kansas City Wizards	Foxborough, Massachusetts
	Leo Cullen 41'; Alex Pineda Chacon 82'	Report	Chris Klein 12' 64'; Dario Fabbro (penalty missed) 84'; Kerry Zavagnin 55'	Stadium: CMGI Field; Attendance: 17,138; Referee: Kevin Terry

July 20 18	MetroStars	4–3	New England Revolution	East Rutherford, New Jersey
	Mike Petke (yellow card) 12'; Andy Williams 25'; Mamadou Diallo 34' 46'; Brad Davis 41'; Rodrigo Faria (yellow card) 67'	Report	Taylor Twellman 43'; Shaker Asad (yellow card) 49'; Steve Ralston 59'; Daniel Hernandez (yellow card) 61' (goal) 63'; Joe Franchino (yellow card) 85'	Stadium: Giants Stadium; Attendance: 13,837; Referee: Terry Vaughn

July 24 19	New England Revolution	2–3	Colorado Rapids	Foxborough, Massachusetts
	Joe Franchino (yellow card) 23'; Taylor Twellman 51'; John Wilson (yellow card) 76' (goal) 90'	Report	Stephen Herdsman (yellow card) 7'; Chris Henderson 34'; Wes Hart (yellow card) 47'; Rick Titus (yellow card) 48'; Zach Kingsley 58' (yellow card) 90+3'; Mark Chung 63'	Stadium: CMGI Field; Attendance: 14,548; Referee: Alex Prus

July 27 20	D.C. United	0–1	New England Revolution	Washington, D.C.
	Ryan Nelsen (yellow card) 53'	Report	Jay Heaps 16'; Joe Franchino (yellow card) 22'; Jay Heaps (yellow card) 58'; Taylor Twellman (yellow card) 88'	Stadium: Robert F. Kennedy Memorial Stadium; Attendance: 24,240; Referee: Ricardo Valanzuela

August 10 21	LA Galaxy	2–1	New England Revolution	Pasadena, California
	Cobi Jones 33' 86'	Report	Carlos Llamosa (yellow card) 14'; Daouda Kante (yellow card) 46'; Daniel Hernandez 62'; Braeden Cloutier (yellow card) 78'	Stadium: Rose Bowl; Attendance: 15,137; Referee: Ricardo Salazar

August 18 22	New England Revolution	0–2	Chicago Fire	Foxborough, Massachusetts
	Douda Kante (yellow card) 61'; Joe Franchino (yellow card) 63'; Brian Kamler (red card)	Report	DaMarcus Beasley (yellow card) 29'; Ante Razov 31'; Histro Stoichkov (yellow card) 53'; Dema Kovalenko (yellow card) 54'; Carlos Bocanegra (yellow card) 59'; Orlando Perez (yellow card) 59'; Leo Cullen (o.g.)	Stadium: Gillette Stadium; Attendance: 15,336; Referee: Ricardo Valanzuela
Note: Naming rights for the Revolution's stadium changed from "CMGI" to "Gillette" on August 5.

August 24 23	Chicago Fire	1–2	New England Revolution	Naperville, Illinois
	Histro Soichkov (yellow card) 6'; Jim Curtin 50'; Carlos Bocanegra (yellow card) 85'	Report	Carlos Llamosa (yellow card) 59'; Wolde Harris 65'; Jay Heaps (yellow card) 70'; Taylor Twellman (yellow card) 83'; Daouda Kante 89'	Stadium: Cardinal Stadium; Attendance: 15,887; Referee: Gerry Corrie

August 28 24	New England Revolution	3–1	Colorado Rapids	Foxborough, Massachusetts
	Taylor Twellman 27' 39'; Daniel Hernandez 39'	Report	Rick Titus (yellow card) 34'; Jeff Stewart (yellow card) 36'; Ritchie Kotschau (yellow card) 61'; Raul Palacios (yellow card) 65'; Mark Chung 75'	Stadium: Gillette Stadium; Attendance: 13,210; Referee: Rich Grady

August 31 25	Columbus Crew	0–0 (a.e.t.)	New England Revolution	Columbus, Ohio
	Duncan Oughton (yellow card) 81'	Report	Joe Franchino (yellow card) 33'	Stadium: Columbus Crew Stadium; Attendance: 24,422; Referee: Kevin Terry

September 7 26	New England Revolution	3–0	D.C. United	Foxborough, Massachusetts
	Daniel Hernandez (yellow card) 8'; Taylor Twellman 63' 75' 90'	Report	Richie Williams (yellow card) 18'; Ben Olsen (yellow card) 32'	Stadium: Gillette Stadium; Attendance: 15,748; Referee: Terry Vaughn

September 14 27	Dallas Burn	1–2	New England Revolution	Dallas, Texas
	Ryan Suarez (red card); Paul Broome (yellow card) 50' (red card); Chad Deering (yellow card) 67'; Jorge Rodriguez 81'	Report	Taylor Twellman 35' 64'; Steve Ralston (yellow card) 62'	Stadium: Cotton Bowl; Attendance: 17,652; Referee: Brian Hall

September 21 28	New England Revolution	3–0	MetroStars	Foxborough, Massachusetts
	Taylor Twellman 5'; Wolde Harris 28' 35'; Joe Franchino (yellow card) 32'	Report	Mike Petke (yellow card) 71'	Stadium: Gillette Stadium; Attendance: 20,215; Referee: Michael Kennedy

=== MLS Playoffs ===
September 26 Conference Semifinals	New England Revolution	2–0	Chicago Fire	Foxborough, Massachusetts
	Taylor Twellman 13'; Daouda Kante (yellow card) 34'; Daniel Hernandez 60' (yellow card) 75'	Report	C.J. Brown (yellow card) 13'; Histro Stoichkov (yellow card) 62'; Jesse Marsch (yellow card) 62'; Dema Kovalenko (yellow card) 84'	Stadium: Gillette Stadium; Attendance: 6,306; Referee: Kevin Stott

September 29 Conference Semifinals	Chicago Fire	2–1	New England Revolution	Naperville, Illinois
	Ante Razov 43' 76'; DeMarcus Beasley (yellow card) 44'; Pitor Nowak (yellow card) 64'; Histro Soichkov (yellow card) 84'	Report	Joe Franchino (yellow card) 14'; Daniel Hernandez (yellow card) 22'; Brian Kamler 28'; Jay Heaps (yellow card) 29'; Daouda Kante (yellow card) 52'; Carlos Llamosa (yellow card) 58' (red card)	Stadium: Cardinal Stadium; Attendance: 9,434; Referee: Ricardo Valenzuela

October 2 Conference Semifinals	New England Revolution	2–0	Chicago Fire	Foxborough, Massachusetts
	Brian Kamler 12'; Joe Franchino (yellow card) 29'; Taylor Twellman 65'	Report	Carlos Bocanegra (yellow card) 53'; Ante Razov (red card)	Stadium: Gillette Stadium; Attendance: 6,954; Referee: Kevin Terry

October 2 Conference Final	New England Revolution	0–0	Columbus Crew	Foxborough, Massachusetts
	Daouda Kante (yellow card) 56' (red card); Daniel Hernandez (yellow card) 83'	Report	Brian Maisonneuve (yellow card) 13'; Jeff Cunningham (yellow card) 38'; Daniel Torres (yellow card) 52'; Brian McBride (yellow card) 85'; Duncan Oughton (yellow card) 88'	Stadium: Gillette Stadium; Attendance: 11,387; Referee: Brian Hall

October 9 Conference Final	Columbus Crew	0–1	New England Revolution	Columbus, Ohio
	Freddy Garcia (yellow card) 40'; Brian Dunseth (yellow card) 79'; Duncan Oughton (yellow card) 90+1'	Report	Jay Heaps 3' (yellow card) 38' (red card)	Stadium: Columbus Crew Stadium; Attendance: 10,245; Referee: Gerry Corrie

October 12 Conference Final	New England Revolution	2–2	Columbus Crew	Foxborough, Massachusetts
	Steve Ralston 17'; Wolde Harris 47'	Report	Brian McBride 80'; Dante Washington 85'	Stadium: Gillette Stadium; Attendance: 9,216; Referee: Kevin Stott

October 20 MLS Cup Final	New England Revolution	0–1 (a.e.t.)	LA Galaxy	Foxborough, Massachusetts
	Joe Franchino (yellow card) 25'; Carlos Llamosa (yellow card) 60'	Report	Simon Elliott (yellow card) 95'; Carlos Ruiz 113'	Stadium: Gillette Stadium; Attendance: 61,316; Referee: Kevin Terry

== Awards ==
Adapted from 2024 New England Revolution Media Guide (pg. 326–328)

=== League awards ===
New England Revolution – 2002 League Awards
Honor	Name
MLS Most Valuable Player	Taylor Twellman (finalist)
MLS Scoring Champion	Taylor Twellman (52 pts; 23g, 6a)
MLS Coach of the Year	Steve Nicol
MLS Best XI	Steve Ralston, Taylor Twelman
MLS Player of the Month	Taylor Twellman (May)
MLS Player of the Week	Taylor Twellman (week 6, Week 25)
MLS All-Stars	Carlos Llamosa, Steve Ralston, Jurgen Sommer, Taylor Twellman
MLS Play of the Year	Taylor Twellman
MLS Goal of the Year	Taylor Twellman (finalist)

=== Team awards ===
New England Revolution – 2002 Team Awards
Honor	Name
Revolution Most Valuable Player	Taylor Twellman
Revolution Scoring Champion	Taylor Twellman
Revolution Defender of the Year	Joe Franchino
Revolution Humanitarian of the Year	Brian Kamler
