= Catê =

Brazilian footballer (1973–2011)

Personal information
- Full name: Marco Antônio Lemos Tozzi
- Date of birth: 7 November 1973
- Place of birth: Cruz Alta, Rio Grande do Sul, Brazil
- Date of death: 27 December 2011 (aged 38)
- Place of death: Ipê, Río Grande do Sul, Brazil
- Height: 1.70 m (5 ft 7 in)
- Position: Striker

Senior career*
| Years | Team | Apps | (Gls) |
| 1989 | Guarany de Cruz Alta | | |
| 1990 | Grêmio | | |
| 1991–1994 | São Paulo | | |
| 1994 | Cruzeiro | | |
| 1995 | São Paulo | | |
| 1996–1998 | Universidad Católica | 57 | (8) |
| 1998–1999 | Sampdoria | | |
| 2000 | Flamengo | | |
| 2001 | New England Revolution | 22 | (8) |
| 2003 | 15 de Novembro | | |
| 2004 | Glória | | |
| 2004–2005 | Maracaibo | | |
| 2005 | Palestino | 10 | (0) |
| 2005 | Remo | | |
| 2006 | Esportivo | | |
| 2008 | Brusque | | |

International career
| 1993 | Brazil U20 | 6 | (1) |

Managerial career
- 2008: Brusque (interim)
- 2008: Itinga
- 2009: Nova Prata
- * Club domestic league appearances and goals

Marco Antônio Lemos Tozzi (7 November 1973 – 27 December 2011), commonly known as Catê, was a Brazilian professional footballer who played for clubs of Brazil, Chile, Italy, the United States and Venezuela.

== Career ==
Born in Cruz Alta, Rio Grande do Sul, Catê began his football career with local side Guarany. He had a brief spell with Grêmio before finding success with São Paulo under manager Telê Santana.

Catê signed with the New England Revolution of Major League Soccer on March 28, 2001, ahead of the 2001 season. He made his Revolution debut on April 28, 2001, coming on as a substitute in the 83rd minute for Alan Woods in a 1-0 loss to the Miami Fusion. He made his first start for the Revolution on May 5, 2001 in a 3-2 loss to the San Jose Earthquakes. Catê scored his first goal for the club (converting a penalty) against the Chicago Fire on May 12, 2001. The following week he recorded a brace in a 2-1 win over the Columbus Crew on May 16, 2001.

Catê was named the Revolution's scoring champion for 2001; leading the team in both goals and assists, with eight and eight respectively. His 2 game-winning assists tied him for first in the club that year, alongside Wolde Harris. Catê was also instrumental in the Revolution's run to the 2001 U.S. Open Cup final, scoring in the second round against the Mid-Michigan Bucks, and in the quarterfinals against the Columbus Crew.

Catê played for Brazil at the 1993 FIFA World Youth Championship finals in Australia.

== Death ==
Catê died in a road traffic accident in the town of Ipê, Rio Grande do Sul, when the car he was driving was involved in a collision with a truck.

== Honours ==
São Paulo

- Copa Libertadores: 1992, 1993
- Intercontinental Cup: 1992, 1993
- Copa Conmebol: 1994
- Campeonato Paulista: 1991, 1992

Cruzeiro

- Campeonato Mineiro: 1994

Universidad Católica

- Copa Libertadores Liguilla: 1996
- Torneo Apertura: 1997

Individual

- Midnight Riders Man of the Year, 2001
