= Leo Cullen =

Leo Cullen may refer to:

- Leo Cullen (rugby union) (born 1978), Irish rugby union player
- Leo Cullen (soccer) (born 1976), retired American soccer defender
