= Joe Franchino =

American soccer player

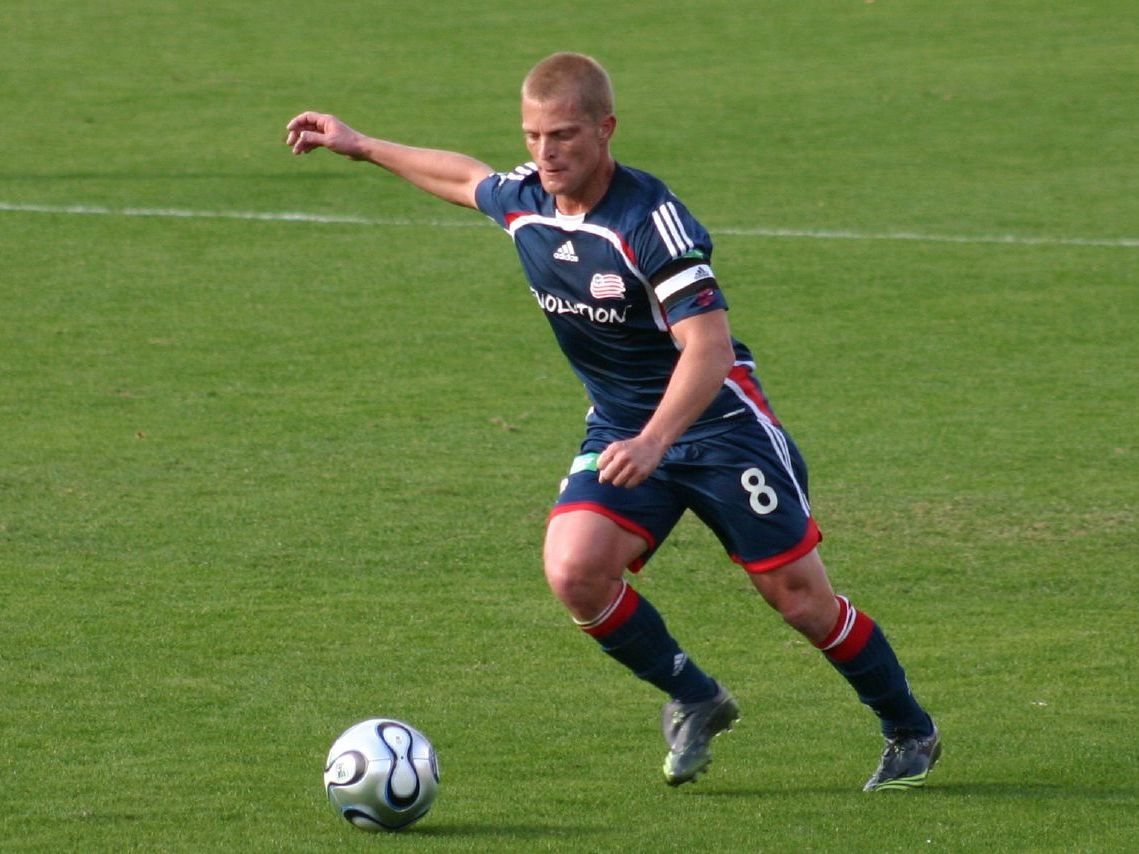

Personal information
- Full name: Joe Franchino
- Date of birth: August 9, 1976 (age 50)
- Place of birth: Fontana, California, United States
- Height: 5 ft 9 in (1.75 m)
- Position: Defensive midfielder

Youth career
- 1994–1995: Fullerton Titans
- 1996–1997: Washington Huskies

Senior career*
Years	Team	Apps	(Gls)
1998–2000	Los Angeles Galaxy	49	(0)
1998	→ MLS Pro 40 (loan)	2	(0)
1999	→ Orange County Zodiac (loan)	1	(0)
2000–2008	New England Revolution	162	(5)
2008	Los Angeles Galaxy	14	(0)
Total		228	(5)

International career
2000	United States	1	(0)
- * Club domestic league appearances and goals

Joe Franchino (born August 9, 1976, in Fontana, California) is an American former soccer player.

== Youth and college ==
Franchino played youth club soccer in Alta Loma, CA for such competitive teams as the Aztecs and Arsenal. His first club team, the Aztecs, won the State Cup Championships the first year the Under-10 age bracket started. For High School he attended and played soccer at Damien High School in La Verne, California.

He played college soccer at Cal State Fullerton- where he was coached by Al Mistri in 1994 and 1995, and was named to Soccer America's All-Freshman team. After his sophomore year, Franchino transferred to the University of Washington, where he played in 1996 and 1997.

== Career ==
=== Professional ===
Franchino was selected 30th overall in the 1998 MLS College Draft by the Los Angeles Galaxy. After appearing in 16 games and recording four assists as a rookie, Franchino became a consistent starter for the Galaxy in 1999. He played in 25 games in 1999, 16 of them starts, and recorded three assists.

==== New England Revolution ====
In the middle of the 2000 season, however, the Galaxy were forced by the league to give Franchino to the New England Revolution, along with Clint Mathis to the MetroStars, in exchange for the marquee acquisition of Luis Hernández.

While Hernandez was a colossal failure, Franchino became an important and consistent part of the Revolution's lineup. He was a fixture for the Revolution in the backline and midfield during his first six seasons with the club, never playing in fewer than 20 games per season. After a MLS "Special Draft" sent Franchino to the Revolution on May 17, 2000, he started all 22 games he appeared in for New England in 2000 and played a semi-regular starting role for the next six years, during some of which he was team captain, including the 2002 season, in which he led the Revolution to MLS Cup 2002 final. Franchino made his Revolution debut on May 20, 2000, in a 1-0 victory over Chicago Fire FC. Four days later he made his home debut, in a 2-1 win over his former club, the LA Galaxy. He scored his first Revolution goal (part of a brace) in the final match of the season, a 4-3 win over the MetroStars, on September 9, 2000. Franchino was second in matches-started for the Revolution during the 2001 New England Revolution season with 23, and recorded 23 more starts in 2002. As a result, he received the Revolution Defender of the Year Award. He was also a finalist for the 2003 MLS Goal of the Year Award. Franchino became the first player in Revolution history to ever win MLS Goal of the Week, earning the honors for his week 5 goal against the LA Galaxy on May 1.

==== Return to LA ====
On April 18, 2008, the Revolution traded Franchino to the Los Angeles Galaxy in exchange for a second-round pick in the 2009 MLS SuperDraft. On November 26, 2008, the Galaxy waived Franchino.

=== International ===
Franchino played one game with the U.S. national team, earning a cap in a friendly against Mexico on October 25, 2000.

== Honors ==
LA Galaxy

- Supporters' Shield: 1998
- Western Conference (Playoff): 1999
- Western Conference (Regular Season): 1998, 1999

New England Revolution

- U.S. Open Cup: 2007
- Eastern Conference (Playoff): 2002, 2005, 2006, 2007
- Eastern Conference (Regular Season): 2005

Individual

- New England Revolution Defender of the Year: 2002
