= Adin Brown =

American former soccer player

Personal information
- Full name: Adin Brown
- Date of birth: May 27, 1978 (age 48)
- Place of birth: Pleasant Hill, California, United States
- Height: 6 ft 5 in (1.96 m)
- Position: Goalkeeper

College career
Years	Team	Apps	(Gls)
1996–1999	William & Mary Tribe		

Senior career*
Years	Team	Apps	(Gls)
2000–2001	Colorado Rapids	22	(0)
2001	Tampa Bay Mutiny	13	(0)
2002–2004	New England Revolution	48	(0)
2005–2009	Aalesund	68	(1)
2010	Portland Timbers (USL)	1	(0)
2011	Portland Timbers	2	(0)
Total		154	(1)

International career
1999–2000	United States U23	6	(0)

Managerial career
- 2013–2015: Portland Pilots (goalkeeping)
- 2015–2020: Portland Timbers (goalkeeping)
- 2020–2022: Chicago Fire (goalkeeping)
- 2023–: San Jose Earthquakes (goalkeeping)
Medal record
Representing United States
Third place	CONCACAF Gold Cup	2003
Men's Soccer
- * Club domestic league appearances and goals

Adin Brown (born May 27, 1978) is an American soccer coach and former player. He is currently the goalkeeping coach for San Jose Earthquakes in Major League Soccer.

== Youth and High School ==
Born in Pleasant Hill, California, Brown attended De La Salle High School in Concord, California. He started for the 1996 soccer team which is now in the Hall of Fame at De La Salle. The 1996 De La Salle team is the only team in school history to have a perfect record, while letting in no goals in the regular season. Only 3 goals were let in during the playoffs.

== Career ==
=== College ===
A highly touted prospect and a starting goalkeeper for the United States in the run-up prior to the 2000 Summer Olympics, Brown played college soccer at the College of William and Mary. In 1999, he became only the third goalkeeper in NCAA history (Tony Meola and Brad Friedel were the other two) to be named NCAA First Team All-American twice.

=== Professional ===
The Colorado Rapids then made Brown the third overall pick of the 2000 MLS SuperDraft. Rosenborg BK of the Eliteserien bid $1M for Brown's services, but the bid was rejected. Brown signed a five-year deal with MLS. Brown's pro career was not as solid as was expected due to various injuries. In 2000 and 2001 with the Rapids, Brown made 22 starts, and recorded three shutouts over 1,976 minutes. After sharing goalkeeping duties with David Kramer in his rookie season (an injury which kept him from going to the Olympics), Brown was the principal of the deal that sent Carlos Valderrama from the Tampa Bay Mutiny to Colorado.

The trade saw Valderrama, goalkeeper Scott Garlick and defender Ritchie Kotschau sent to Colorado for Brown, defender Scott Vermillion and the Rapids' first-round pick in the 2002 MLS SuperDraft. Vermillion was then dealt to D.C. United for defender Eric Denton.

After only half of one season in Tampa, the Mutiny folded, leaving him exposed in the 2002 MLS Dispersal Draft. Brown's high contract kept him from being selected, although he signed with the New England Revolution a few days after the draft, on January 15, 2002.

It was in New England that Brown had his best season in 2002; Brown won the starting job from Juergen Sommer midway through the year and led the Revolution to the brink of winning MLS Cup 2002, posting one of the "finest performances ever seen in MLS history during the 2002 playoffs." Brown started sixteen games and posted a 1.23 goals-against average in the 2002 MLS regular season. Call-ups (but no caps) to the senior national team and a solid 2003 followed, in which Brown made 25 starts and posted a 1.42 goals-against average, being named Revolution team Defender of the Year. but so did more injuries.

During the 2004 New England Revolution season, Brown's playing time was reduced due to struggles with injuries, and also the emergence of Matt Reis, who had joined the Revolution from the LA Galaxy in 2003. Brown would make only seven appearances during the campaign, and without a starting job, he signed with Aalesunds FK on a free transfer.

Brown played 69 games in net during his tenure with Aalesund from 2005 to 2009. In 2006, he led Aalesund to a second-place finish in the Norwegian First Division, and a return to the country's Premier League in 2007.

On July 2, 2007, Brown made a number of great saves early in the game against Rosenborg, and then he headed in the equalizer at the end of the stoppage time to tie the game 2–2. It was his first ever goal.

In the next few seasons he spent most of his time being injured and was retired from the Aalesund squad after the season of 2009. Brown became a cult figure at Aalesund FK.

On February 23, 2010, Brown signed with Portland Timbers in the USSF Division 2 Professional League. He made his first appearance for the team on September 25, 2010, in Portland's penultimate game of the 2010 season, as a late replacement for an injured Matt Pyzdrowski in a game against Crystal Palace Baltimore. Brown signed with the new Major League Soccer expansion team Portland Timbers on January 18, 2011.

Following the 2011 season, the Timbers announced that they had declined a second year option on Brown's contract and he would not be brought back for the 2012 season. Brown entered the 2011 MLS Re-Entry Draft but was not selected and became a free agent.

On March 12, 2012, the Timbers announced that Brown would be one of the team's Alumni Ambassadors, making public appearances for the team and assisting with the team's youth efforts and clinics.
