= MLS Cup 2002 =

2002 edition of the MLS Cup

- Event: MLS Cup
Los Angeles Galaxy	New England Revolution
1	0
- After golden goal in extra time
- Date: October 20, 2002
- Venue: Gillette Stadium, Foxborough, Massachusetts, U.S.
- MLS Cup MVP: Carlos Ruiz (Los Angeles Galaxy)
- Referee: Kevin Terry
- Attendance: 61,316
- Weather: Sunny, 56 °F (13 °C)

MLS Cup 2002 was the seventh edition of the MLS Cup, the championship match of Major League Soccer (MLS), which took place on October 20, 2002. It was hosted at Gillette Stadium in Foxborough, Massachusetts, United States, and contested by the New England Revolution and the Los Angeles Galaxy to decide the champion of the 2002 season. The Revolution, who were named hosts before the season, were playing in their first MLS Cup; Los Angeles had lost in all three of their previous cup appearances.

Los Angeles won their first championship 1–0 in the second overtime on a sudden-death goal scored by Carlos Ruiz. The match was attended by 61,316 spectators, the largest figure for any MLS Cup until 2018. It was also the last MLS final to end with a golden goal.

== Venue ==
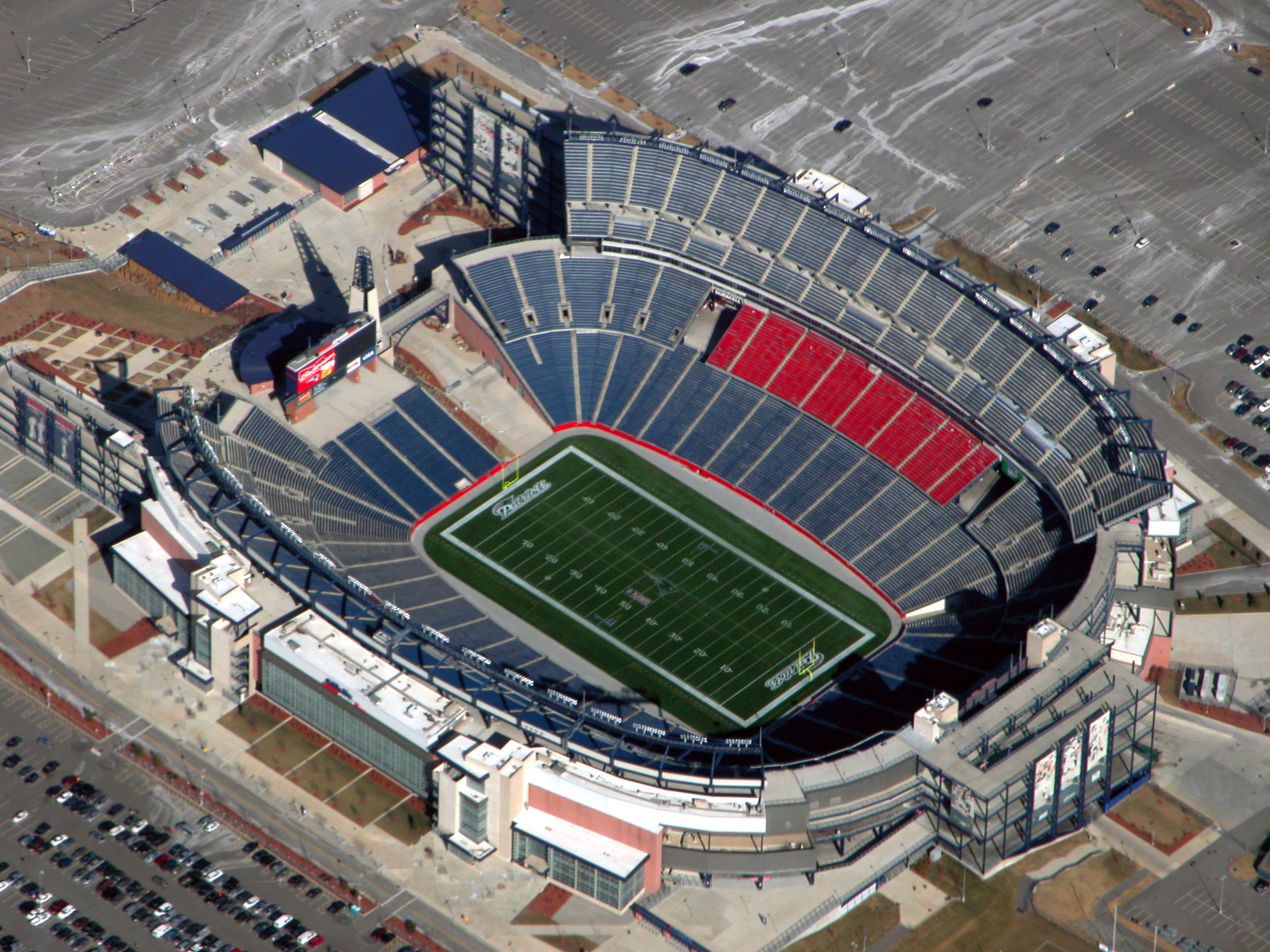
Gillette Stadium, host of MLS Cup 2002

CMGI Field in Foxborough, Massachusetts, home of the New England Revolution and the New England Patriots of the National Football League (NFL), was announced as the neutral-site venue of the MLS Cup on February 13, 2002. The new stadium was built to replace the former Foxboro Stadium, which had hosted the inaugural MLS Cup in 1996 and the 1999 edition. CMGI Field was later renamed Gillette Stadium in August after the naming rights were sold to Gillette. Approximately 20,000 tickets were sold by October 10, but sales reached 55,000 after the Revolution advanced from the Conference Finals, and were on pace to match or surpass the MLS Cup attendance record of 57,431 set in 1997. The stadium's capacity was restricted to 60,000 seats, excluding the box and club seats, and the field itself measured 75 by 106 yards (69 m × 97 m), wider than the configuration used in 1999 at Foxboro Stadium.

== Road to the final ==
The MLS Cup is the post-season championship of Major League Soccer (MLS), a professional club soccer league based in the United States. The 2002 season was the seventh in the league's history and was contested by ten teams in two conferences following the folding of two teams in Florida and the reorganization of the Central Division. Each team played a total of 28 matches in the regular season, which ran from March to September, facing teams within their conference four times and outside of their conference two times. The playoffs ran from late September to October and was contested by the top eight teams overall, with the top two teams in each conference given a higher seed regardless of overall standing. The playoffs were organized into three rounds, the first two being a home-and-away series organized into a best-of-three format with the first team to earn five points advancing, and the single-match MLS Cup final.

MLS Cup 2002 was contested by the Los Angeles Galaxy, who also won the regular season's Supporters' Shield, and the New England Revolution, the highest-ranked team from the Eastern Conference. The Galaxy and Revolution played each other twice in the regular season: a 3–2 victory for New England on May 25 and a 2–1 win for Los Angeles on August 10. The two teams also played each other in the 2001 U.S. Open Cup Final, where Los Angeles won 2–1 in overtime.

=== Los Angeles Galaxy ===
The Los Angeles Galaxy had qualified for the playoffs in each of the league's previous six seasons and were runners-up at the MLS Cup on three previous occasions: losing to D.C. United in 1996 and 1999, and to in-state rivals San Jose Earthquakes in 2001. While they had won other competitions, including the U.S. Open Cup and the CONCACAF Champions' Cup, the team were compared to the NFL's Buffalo Bills, who were runners-up at the Super Bowl several times in the 1990s. Guatemalan forward Carlos Ruiz, who was acquired in the offseason, scored 24 goals in his first season with the Galaxy and was named the league's most valuable player (MVP). The Galaxy finished as Supporters' Shield champions with 51 points, while the remaining Western Conference teams all qualified for the playoffs. Veteran forward Cobi Jones ranked second in goals scored for the Galaxy, behind Ruiz, and enjoyed a comeback season alongside defender and U.S. compatriot Alexi Lalas.

In the Conference Semifinals, Los Angeles faced the bottom-seeded Kansas City Wizards in a first-to-five point series. The first leg at the Rose Bowl in Pasadena, California, was won by the Galaxy 3–2 after a golden goal was scored by Ruiz in the 99th minute. The Wizards won 4–1 in the second leg at Arrowhead Stadium, setting up a series-deciding third match at the Rose Bowl. Los Angeles won the third leg 5–2, with two goals each for Jones and Ruiz, and advanced to the Conference Finals with six points. The Galaxy played against the Colorado Rapids in the Western Conference Finals, held over the following week under the same format as the Semifinals. The team won 4–0 at the Rose Bowl and 1–0 at INVESCO Field in Denver, bringing the Galaxy to their fourth MLS Cup final.

=== New England Revolution ===
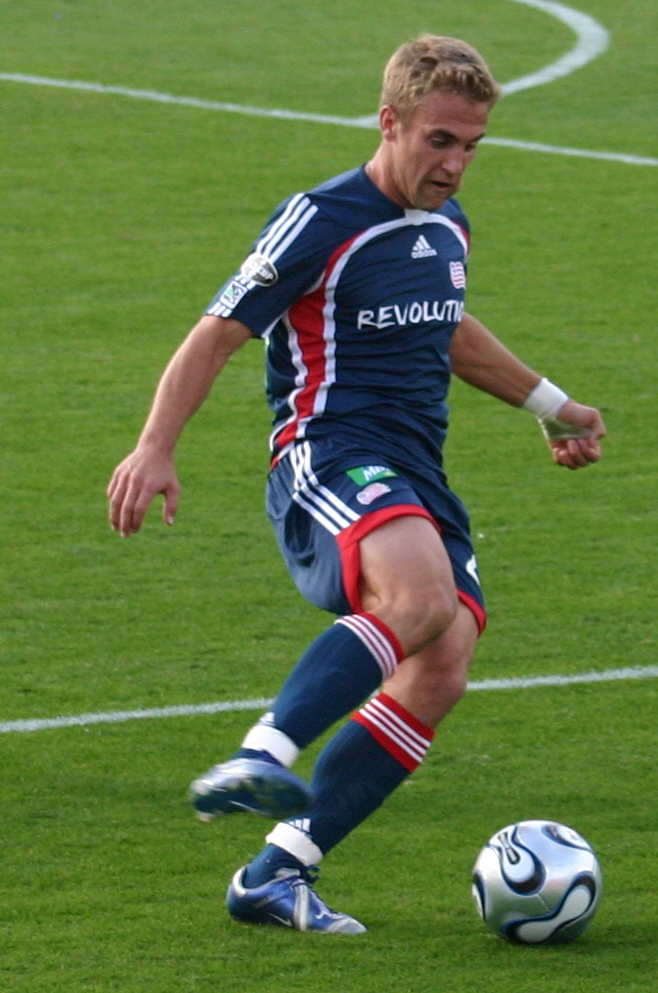
New England Revolution forward Taylor Twellman, who led the team in scoring

The Revolution failed to qualify for the playoffs in 2001, following several years of poor on-field performances that resulted in the worst winning record of the league's ten teams. Despite their league performance, New England finished as runners-up to the Galaxy in the 2001 U.S. Open Cup. During the 2002 preseason, the club acquired several players from the Tampa Bay Mutiny and Miami Fusion in trades and the Allocation Draft following the contraction of the two clubs, including league MVP Alex Pineda Chacón, forward Mamadou Diallo, midfielder Steve Ralston, and defender Carlos Llamosa. New England also drafted forward Taylor Twellman in the 2002 MLS SuperDraft following a successful college career and a return from TSV 1860 Munich.

Head coach Fernando Clavijo was fired after the seventh match of the season, with the Revolution only winning two. Assistant coach Steve Nicol was promoted to interim head coach on May 23 and completed a turnaround from last to first in the Eastern Conference, leading the team into the playoffs and earning the coach of the year award. New England finished the season with a six-match unbeaten streak and a total record of 12 wins, 14 losses, and two draws, scoring a league-high 49 goals. The team narrowly qualified for the playoffs on the final day of the season, with all three qualifiers from the Eastern Conference within one point of each other.

New England played the seventh-seeded Chicago Fire in the Conference Semifinals, winning the first leg 2–0 at Gillette Stadium on goals by Twellman and Daniel Hernández. The Fire won the second leg 2–1, setting up a deciding match at Gillette Stadium on October 2. The Revolution won 2–0 in the third match, clinching their first playoff series win and advancing to face the Columbus Crew in the Conference Semifinals. The first leg at Gillette Stadium was a scoreless tie and the Revolution won the second leg in Columbus 1–0 on an early goal scored by defender Jay Heaps, who was later ejected for an altercation with Freddy García. After earning a 2–0 lead in the third leg, New England conceded two late goals to draw 2–2 and force overtime. Neither team could score the golden goal needed to clinch a series win outright, leaving the Revolution with 5–2 in points and qualifying them for the MLS Cup final. The Revolution became the second team to play an MLS Cup final at their home stadium, following D.C. United in 1997, which also held the attendance record. Despite a sprain in his right knee after the last match of the Conference Final, Twellman recovered in time for the cup final.

=== Summary of results ===
Note: In all results below, the score of the finalist is given first (H: home; A: away). Playoffs were in best-of-three format requiring five points to advance and sudden death extra time as a tiebreaker.

Los Angeles Galaxy				Round	New England Revolution			
1st place in Western Conference: Pos. / Club / Pld. / W / L / D / Pts.; 1 / Los Angeles Galaxy (SS) / 28 / 16 / 9 / 3 / 51; 2 / San Jose Earthquakes / 28 / 14 / 11 / 3 / 45; 3 / Dallas Burn / 28 / 12 / 9 / 7 / 43; 4 / Colorado Rapids / 28 / 13 / 11 / 4 / 43; 5 / Kansas City Wizards / 28 / 9 / 10 / 9 / 36; Source: MLS Qualified for playoffs Supporters' Shield winner				Regular season	1st place in Eastern Conference: Pos. / Club / Pld. / W / L / D / Pts.; 1 / New England Revolution / 28 / 12 / 14 / 2 / 38; 2 / Columbus Crew / 28 / 11 / 12 / 5 / 38; 3 / Chicago Fire / 28 / 11 / 13 / 4 / 37; 4 / MetroStars / 28 / 11 / 15 / 2 / 35; 5 / D.C. United / 28 / 9 / 14 / 5 / 32; Source: MLS Qualified for playoffs			
Opponent (Pts.)	1st leg	2nd leg	3rd leg	MLS Cup Playoffs	Opponent (Pts.)	1st leg	2nd leg	3rd leg
Kansas City Wizards (6–3)	3–2 (a.e.t.) (H)	1–4 (A)	5–2 (H)	Conference Semifinals	Chicago Fire (6–3)	2–0 (H)	1–2 (A)	2–0 (H)
Colorado Rapids (6–0)	4–0 (H)	1–0 (A)	—	Conference Finals	Columbus Crew (5–2)	0–0 (H)	1–0 (A)	2–2 (H)

== Broadcasting ==
The MLS Cup final was televised in the United States on ABC in English and Spanish using secondary audio programming. English play-by-play commentary was provided by JP Dellacamera with color analysis by Ty Keough; the pregame and half-time shows were hosted by Terry Gannon and Eric Wynalda, reprising their roles from ABC's coverage of the 2002 FIFA World Cup. The Spanish broadcast was handled by play-by-play commentator Ernesto Motta and color analyst Andres Rodriguez. The ABC broadcast was watched by an estimated audience of 1.2 million views, the lowest for an MLS Cup at the time.

== Match ==
=== Summary ===
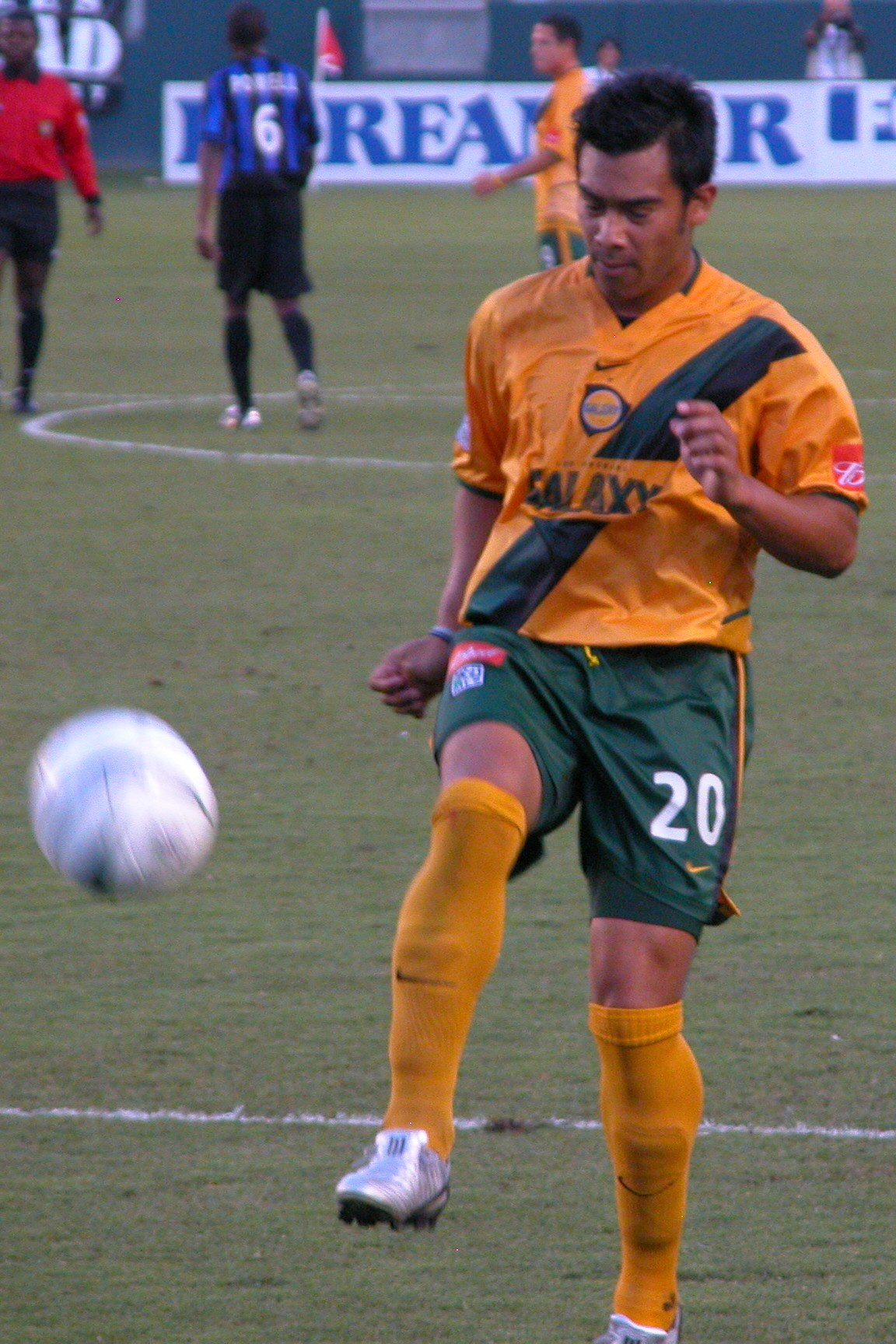
Forward Carlos Ruiz, whose golden goal won the MLS Cup for the Los Angeles Galaxy

The 2002 final was referred by Kevin Terry, who previously officiated the 1998 final. In the event of a draw after regulation time, the match would be decided by two 15-minute overtime periods with the golden goals followed by a penalty shootout if necessary. At kickoff, set for 1:30 p.m. Eastern Time, the weather in Foxborough was sunny with a temperature of 56 °F (13 °C).

Los Angeles kicked off the match and had most of the chances in the scoreless first half while preventing the Revolution from making a single shot on goal. The Galaxy had the game's first two shots, in the 12th and 17th minutes, but they failed to be shot on target by Tyrone Marshall and Carlos Ruiz. New England responded with a cross by Joe Franchino in the 26th minute for Taylor Twellman and Steve Ralston, but neither could reach the ball in time. Franchino was shown a yellow card in the 24th minute for a challenge on Cobi Jones, one of several that the two captains traded.

The second half began with a series of hard challenges by players on both teams to win possession of the ball, which was sent down the flanks by the Galaxy's Cobi Jones and the Revolution's Leo Cullen. Both wingers sent in crosses that were hit towards the goal and deflected away. During the last ten minutes of regulation time, both teams produced several chances that were deflected away by defenders, with the Revolution relying on substitute Alex Pineda Chacón, who entered in the 75th minute. Ruiz was given a clear shot on goal in the 80th minute, but the ball was deflected away by defender Daouda Kanté for a goal kick. A final shot by Chacón in stoppage time was saved by Galaxy goalkeeper Kevin Hartman, his first of the match, and the MLS Cup final was sent into overtime.

The Galaxy took control of the match during overtime, with an early chance in the 93rd minute missed by Jones. A bicycle kick by Ruiz in the 102nd minute was saved by Revolution goalkeeper Adin Brown, who followed minutes later with a second save on Ruiz at the beginning of the second overtime period. A wayward shot by New England substitute Winston Griffiths in the 111th minute was deflected and hit the crossbar, preventing the game-winning goal. The Galaxy cleared the deflected ball and followed two minutes later with a diagonal cross by defender Tyrone Marshall that found Ruiz, who hit a left-footed that shot past Brown and went into the net. The MLS Cup final, the longest match in MLS Cup history, ended after 113 minutes with Ruiz's golden goal. Ruiz was named the MLS Cup Most Valuable Player for his winning goal.

=== Details ===
October 20, 2002
13:30 EDT

Los Angeles Galaxy	1–0 (2OT)	New England Revolution
Ruiz 113'	Report

Gillette Stadium
Foxborough, Massachusetts
Attendance: 61,316
Referee: Kevin Terry

Los Angeles Galaxy
New England Revolution

GK	22	(United States) Kevin Hartman
DF	23	(United States) Danny Califf
DF	30	(United States) Alexi Lalas
DF	14	(Jamaica) Tyrone Marshall
MF	17	(Saint Vincent and the Grenadines) Ezra Hendrickson
MF	13	(United States) Cobi Jones (c)
MF	12	(New Zealand) Simon Elliott	(yellow card) 95'
MF	10	(El Salvador) Mauricio Cienfuegos		(substituted off) 62'
MF	11	(United States) Sasha Victorine
FW	20	(Guatemala) Carlos Ruiz
FW	10	(Venezuela) Alejandro Moreno		(substituted off) 67'
Substitutes:
MF	8	(United States) Peter Vagenas		(substituted on) 62'
DF	5	(United States) Chris Albright		(substituted on) 67'
Manager:
(United States) Sigi Schmid

GK	24	(United States) Adin Brown
DF	6	(United States) Jay Heaps
DF	18	(United States) Carlos Llamosa	(yellow card) 60'	(substituted off) 90+2'
DF	12	(Mali) Daouda Kanté
DF	8	(United States) Joe Franchino (c)	(yellow card) 24'
MF	14	(United States) Steve Ralston
MF	2	(United States) Leo Cullen
MF	7	(United States) Daniel Hernández
MF	5	(United States) Brian Kamler		(substituted off) 90'
FW	13	(Jamaica) Wolde Harris		(substituted off) 75'
FW	20	(United States) Taylor Twellman
Substitutes:
DF	19	(United States) Rusty Pierce		(substituted on) 90+2'
MF	10	(Honduras) Alex Pineda		(substituted on) 75'
MF	25	(Jamaica) Winston Griffiths		(substituted on) 90'
Manager:
(Scotland) Steve Nicol

MLS Cup Most Valuable Player:
(Guatemala) Carlos Ruiz (Los Angeles Galaxy)

Assistant referees:
(United States) Greg Barkey
(United States) Richard Eddy
Fourth official:
(United States) Michael Kennedy

Match rules

- 90 minutes of regulation time
- Two 15-minute periods of extra time with golden goals to decide a winner.
- Penalty shootout if scores still tied.
- Maximum of three substitutions for outfield players and an additional substitution for the goalkeeper.

== Post-match ==
The match was the first in MLS Cup history to have a scoreless half and remain scoreless at the end of regulation time. It was also the third and final MLS Cup to be decided by a golden goal in overtime, a short-lived rule that would be replaced with a conventional extra time period in 2004. The match was attended by 61,316 spectators, a figure that remains among the highest in MLS playoff history and set a record for an MLS Cup final that was later surpassed in 2018 by Atlanta.

The Galaxy finished their 2002 season with a loss to the Columbus Crew in the 2002 U.S. Open Cup four days later in Columbus, Ohio. Both teams qualified for the 2003 CONCACAF Champions' Cup, where the Revolution would be eliminated in the first round and the Galaxy would lose in the quarterfinals.

The Galaxy and Revolution met again in the 2005 final, where Los Angeles repeated their championship with a 1–0 win after extra time. The Revolution would go on to lose the MLS Cup in 2006 and 2007 to the Houston Dynamo and in 2014 to the Galaxy, who would claim their fifth title. Due to their finishes as MLS Cup runners-up, the Revolution are known as the "Buffalo Bills of MLS", mirroring the football team's second-place finishes at the Super Bowl in the 1990s.
