= Tyrone Marshall =

Jamaican football player (born 1974)

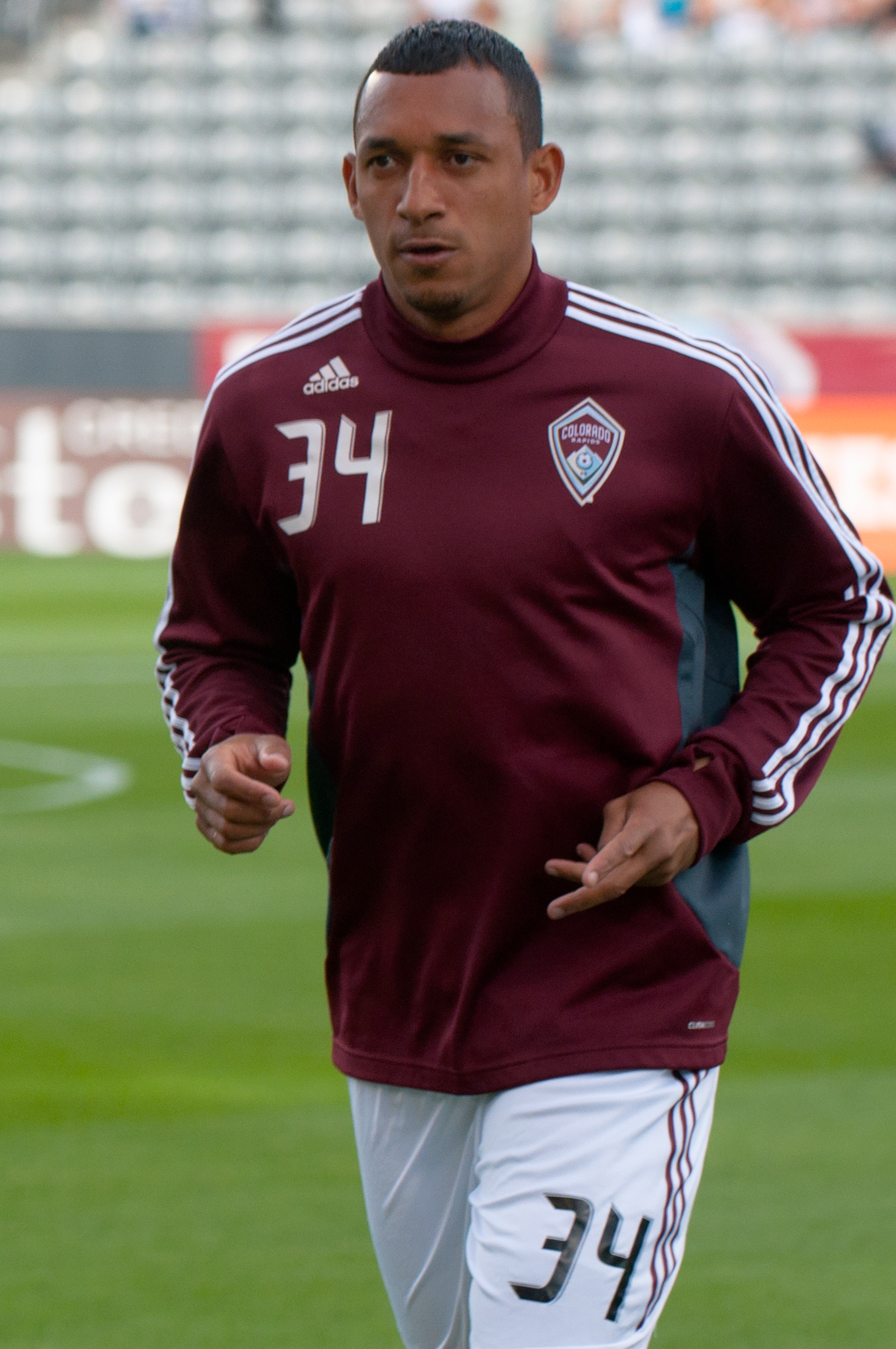
- Tyrone Marshall in 2011 (Colorado Rapids)

Personal information
- Full name: Tyrone Everton Marshall
- Date of birth: 12 November 1974 (age 51)
- Place of birth: Kingston, Jamaica
- Height: 6 ft 2 in (1.88 m)
- Position: Defender

College career
Years	Team	Apps	(Gls)
1994–1995	Lindsey Wilson Blue Raiders		
1996–1997	FIU Golden Panthers		

Senior career*
Years	Team	Apps	(Gls)
1998	Colorado Rapids	1	(0)
1998	→ MLS Pro 40 (loan)	12	(2)
1998–2001	Miami Fusion	82	(9)
2002–2007	Los Angeles Galaxy	125	(4)
2007–2008	Toronto	40	(0)
2009–2010	Seattle Sounders	46	(3)
2011–2012	Colorado Rapids	43	(2)
Total		349	(20)

International career
2000–2010	Jamaica	84	(5)

Managerial career
- 2014: River City Rovers
- 2015–2020: Real Salt Lake (assistant)
- 2021: FC Cincinnati (interim)
- 2022–2025: FC Cincinnati 2
- * Club domestic league appearances and goals

Tyrone Everton Marshall (born 12 November 1974) is a Jamaican former footballer and coach.

== Career ==
=== Youth and college ===
Marshall moved to the Fort Lauderdale, Florida area when he was twelve years old. He attended Lindsey Wilson College from 1994 to 1995 before transferring to Florida International University where he played on the men's soccer team from 1996 to 1997.

=== Professional ===
==== Colorado Rapids ====
Marshall was drafted by Colorado Rapids with the 11th overall pick of the 1998 MLS College Draft. He played only one game for Colorado, then was dealt, along with Jason Boyce, to Miami Fusion on 14 August 1998 in exchange for David Vaudreuil.

==== Miami Fusion and LA Galaxy ====
Marshall would spend the next three and a half seasons in Miami, starting as a forward and eventually drifting to the midfield and then defense. After the Fusion folded following the 2001 season, Marshall was selected by Los Angeles Galaxy as the ninth pick of the 2002 MLS Allocation Draft and helped LA to victory in MLS Cup 2002.

On 13 June 2007, Marshall received a red card for a tackle which broke the leg of FC Dallas forward Kenny Cooper in the 89th minute. The red card carries a mandatory one-game suspension and $250 fine, but the MLS Disciplinary Committee decided unanimously to extend the suspension two additional games and an additional fine of $1,250.

==== Toronto FC ====
Marshall was traded to Toronto FC for Edson Buddle on 13 June 2007 after five seasons with the Galaxy. Marshall cemented his place in Toronto's defense, and went on to make 16 starts during the 2007 season. Marshall managed to get revenge on his former side when Toronto earned their first win of the 2008 season in Los Angeles.

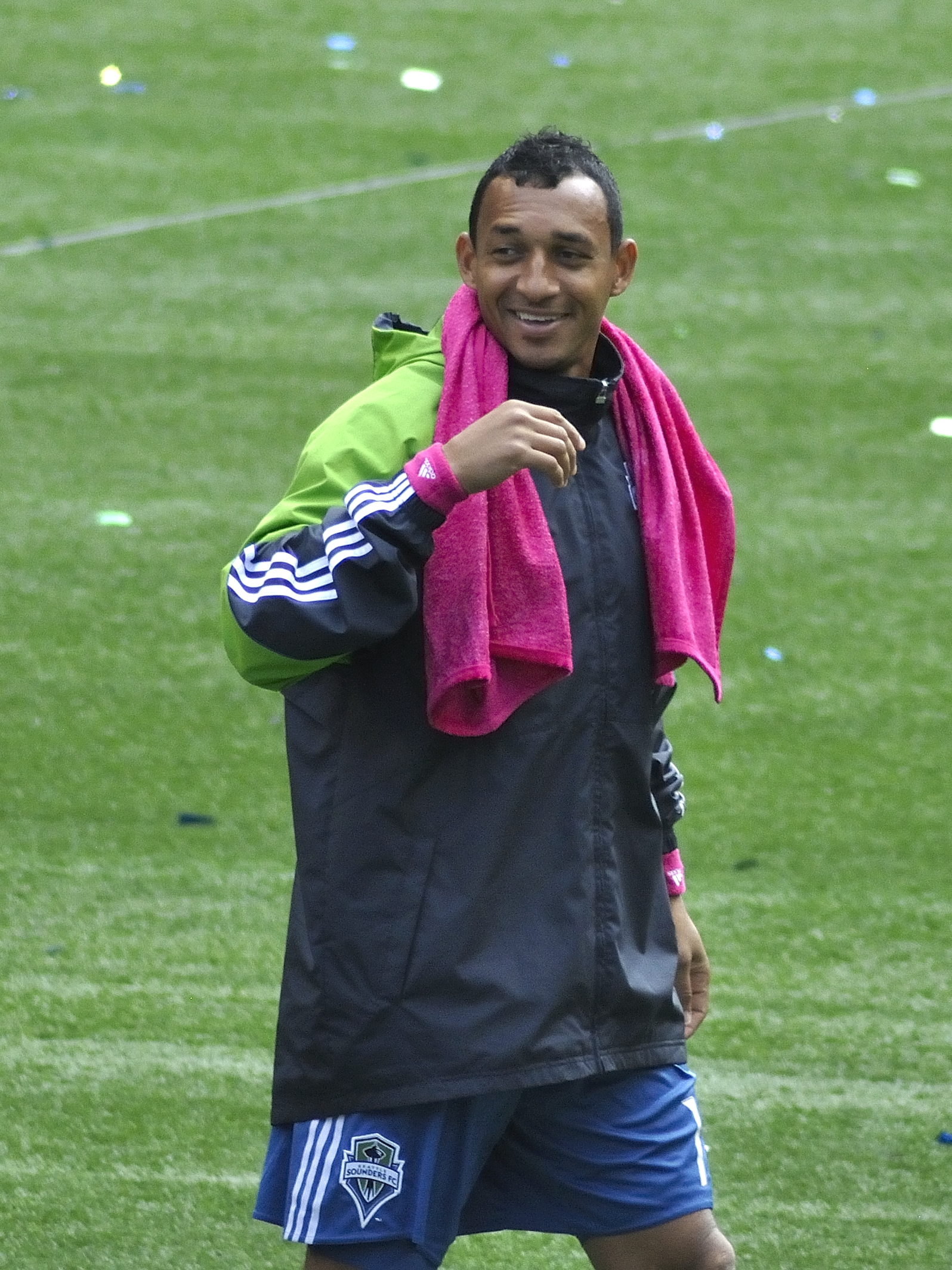
Seattle Sounders FC 2010

==== Seattle Sounders FC ====
Marshall was traded to Seattle Sounders FC on 10 February 2009 for allocation money. He scored his first goal for the Sounders against Chicago Fire as the game finished 1–1. He also assisted a goal by Steve Zakuani in a match against San Jose. However, in the 86th minute in a match against D.C. United, Marshall accidentally scored an own goal with his head, and the game finished 3–3. He scored his second goal for the club on 17 October, in a game against Kansas City Wizards.

==== Return to the Colorado Rapids ====
After the 2010 MLS season Seattle declined Marshall's contract option and Marshall elected to participate in the 2010 MLS Re-Entry Draft. On 15 December 2010 Marshall was selected by Colorado Rapids in Stage 2 of the Re-Entry draft. Marshall agreed to the terms of his contract on 3 January 2011 officially completing the transfer.

Marshall was released by Colorado on 16 November 2012. He entered the 2012 MLS Re-Entry Draft and became a free agent after going undrafted in both rounds of the draft.

=== International ===
Marshall was a regular with the Jamaica national team. He appeared in 83 matches from 2000 to 2010 before retiring from international football in January 2010, after appearing versus Canada.

== Management ==
Marshall was named head coach of the River City Rovers of the USL Premier Development League for the 2014 season. In 2015 Marshall was named an assistant coach for Real Salt Lake. Marshall continued as an assistant coach when head coach Jeff Cassar was fired and replaced by Mike Petke, and again in 2019 when Petke was fired and replaced with Freddy Juarez.

He joined FC Cincinnati in February 2021 to coach their under-19 academy team and future under-23 squad. On September 27, 2021, Marshall was named interim head coach of FC Cincinnati's senior team for the remainder of the 2021 season following the dismissal of Jaap Stam. On February 22, 2022, FC Cincinnati announced that Marshall will be the first head coach of the team's MLS Next Pro reserve team, FC Cincinnati 2.

== Career statistics ==
=== Club statistics ===
As of 11 June 2012.

Club performance			League		Cup		League Cup		Continental		Total	
Club	League	Season	Apps	Goals	Apps	Goals	Apps	Goals	Apps	Goals	Apps	Goals
United States			League		U.S. Open Cup		MLS Playoffs		North America		Total	
Colorado Rapids	MLS	1998	1	0			—		0	0		
Miami Fusion	MLS	1998	8	1			0	0	—			
Miami Fusion	MLS	1999	28	4			2	0	—			
Miami Fusion	MLS	2000	23	1			—					
Miami Fusion	MLS	2001	23	3			5	0	—			
Los Angeles Galaxy	MLS	2002	24	0			6	0				
Los Angeles Galaxy	MLS	2003	25	0			2	0				
Los Angeles Galaxy	MLS	2004	18	2			3	1	—			
Los Angeles Galaxy	MLS	2005	25	1			3	0	—			
Los Angeles Galaxy	MLS	2006	25	0			—					
Los Angeles Galaxy	MLS	2007	8	1			—		—			
Canada			League		Canadian Championship		MLS Playoffs		North America		Total	
Toronto FC	MLS	2007	16	0	—		—		—		16	0
Toronto FC	MLS	2008	24	0	3	0	—		—		27	0
United States			League		U.S. Open Cup		MLS Playoffs		North America		Total	
Seattle Sounders FC	MLS	2009	26	2			1	0	—			
Seattle Sounders FC	MLS	2010	20	1	1	0	2	0	7	0	30	1
Colorado Rapids	MLS	2011	27	0	1	0	1	0	2	0	31	0
Colorado Rapids	MLS	2012	16	2	2	0	0	0	—		18	2
Career totals	United States		297	18			25	1				
Career totals	Canada		40	0	3	0	0	0	0	0	43	0
Career totals	Career statistics		337	17			25	1				

=== International Goals ===
#	Date	Venue	Opponent	Score	Result	Competition
1	6 February 2008	Independence Park, Kingston, Jamaica	Costa Rica	1 - 1	1 - 1	Friendly
2	26 March 2008	Independence Park, Kingston, Jamaica	Trinidad and Tobago	1 - 1	2 - 2	Friendly
3	18 June 2008	Thomas Robinson Stadium, Nassau, Bahamas	Bahamas	4 - 0	6 - 0	2010 FIFA World Cup qualification

== Honours ==
Miami Fusion

- Major League Soccer Supporters' Shield: 2001

Los Angeles Galaxy

- Major League Soccer MLS Cup: 2002, 2005
- Major League Soccer Supporters' Shield: 2002
- Major League Soccer Western Conference Championship: 2002, 2005
- Lamar Hunt U.S. Open Cup: 2005

Seattle Sounders FC

- Lamar Hunt U.S. Open Cup: 2009, 2010

Individual

- CONCACAF Gold Cup Best XI (Honorable Mention): 2005
