= Johnny Torres =

Colombian American soccer player (born 1976)

Personal information
- Full name: Johnny Torres
- Date of birth: April 24, 1976 (age 50)
- Place of birth: Medellín, Colombia
- Height: 5 ft 7 in (1.70 m)
- Position: Midfielder

Team information
- Current team: Creighton Bluejays (head coach)

College career
Years	Team	Apps	(Gls)
1994–1998	Creighton Bluejays	85	(46)

Senior career*
Years	Team	Apps	(Gls)
1998–2001	New England Revolution	88	(8)
2000	→ Connecticut Wolves (loan)	1	(0)
2001	Miami Fusion	23	(2)
2001–2007	Milwaukee Wave (indoor)	99	(41)
2002	Chicago Fire	2	(0)
2002–2003	Minnesota Thunder	47	(19)
2004	Milwaukee Wave United	28	(11)
2010–2011	Omaha Vipers (indoor)	17	(17)

International career
1999–2006	U.S. Futsal	13	(9)

Managerial career
- 2007–2010: Creighton Bluejays (assistant)
- 2011: Creighton Bluejays (interim)
- 2011–2018: Creighton Bluejays (assistant)
- 2018–: Creighton Bluejays
- * Club domestic league appearances and goals

Johnny Torres (born April 24, 1976) is a Colombian-American soccer midfielder and coach who is currently the head coach of his alma mater, Creighton University. Torres has played in Major League Soccer, USL-1, and also played for the Omaha Vipers of the Major Indoor Soccer League. He has also earned caps with the U.S. Futsal team.

== Youth ==
Torres was born in Medellín, Colombia, where his father and several uncles played semi-professional soccer. In 1981, when Torres was five years old, his family moved to Houston, Texas where Torres played for the local club team Houston Texans. In 1986, his family decided to return to Colombia, but Torres' youth soccer coach, Carlos Clarke, a native of Chile, offered to adopt Torres. His family agreed, and Torres was adopted by the Clarkes who lived in Dickinson, Texas. Torres would play soccer at Dickinson High School where he was a three-time USA Today high school soccer All-American.

== Player ==
=== College ===
After graduating from high school in 1994, Torres attended Creighton University. The Bluejays had an excellent four-year run during Torres' time with the team. The school racked up a 62–18–5 record and made four consecutive appearances in the NCAA post-season tournament. He was the 1996 Soccer America Player of the Year (for his junior season). In 1996, Torres' senior year, Creighton reached the NCAA College Cup for the first time in school history. Torres was showered with honors during his time at Creighton. He was selected as a Second Team All Missouri Valley Conference (MVC) player as a freshman. The next three years, he made the All-MVC first team. He was also a first-team All-American his junior and senior years. In 1997, he was the MCV Player of the Year, Most Valuable Player (MVP) of the MCV tournament and the Hermann Trophy winner. He is third on Creighton's career scoring list with 46 goals and is tied for second on the career assists list with 36. In 1996, during his time at Creighton, Torres became a U.S. citizen. In 2004, he was inducted into the Creighton University athletic Hall of Fame.

=== Professional ===
On February 1, 1998, the New England Revolution of Major League Soccer (MLS) selected Torres as its top draft pick (fifth overall) in the 1998 MLS College Draft. The Revolution had high hopes for the talented midfielder. Torres made his first start for the Revolution on March 29 against DC United and made his home debut, again vs. DC United, on April 18. He recorded his first goal for the club on April 25 in the Revolution's 3-0 home victory over the Miami Fusion. Torres finished his rookie campaign with two goals and three assists in 20 appearances.

Torres spent four years with the Revolution, never entirely playing up to expectations. He played 88 games, starting 55, scoring only 8 goals and assisting on 14 others. In 2000, the Revolution sent him on loan to the Connecticut Wolves for one game. On August 16, 2001, the Revolution traded Torres, along with Shaker Asad, to the Miami Fusion for Leo Cullen and a 2003 first round draft choice. Torres would only play a single season for the Fusion. Miami was one of the 2 teams contracted after the 2001 season. After the Fusion folded in January 2002, Torres moved to the Milwaukee Wave of the Major Indoor Soccer League (MISL) for the 2001–2002 indoor season, which was already in play. Torres' move to MISL came about from his having played for the U.S. Futsal team in 1999 when Keith Tozer, coach of the Wave, coached the futsal team. When Tozer heard about the Fusion's collapse, he contacted Torres about moving to the MISL.

At the end of the MISL season, Torres briefly returned to MLS, playing four games with the Chicago Fire when the team was decimated with injuries in 2002. However, he left the Fire and moved to the Minnesota Thunder of the A-League, now known as the United Soccer League (USL) First Division. Torres played both the 2002 and 2003 outdoor seasons with the Thunder.

While playing outdoor soccer with the Thunder, Torres also played indoor soccer with the Milwaukee Wave of the MISL. However, in May 2004, he signed with the Wave's parent organization, also known as the Milwaukee Wave. This organization fields two teams, the indoor Milwaukee Wave of the MISL and outdoor Milwaukee Wave United of the USL. This would allow Torres to play both indoor and outdoor soccer with the same organization rather than bouncing between Milwaukee and Minnesota from summer to winter. To sign Torres, the Wave United traded forward Dan Antoniuk to the San Diego Sockers for a 2005 fourth round draft pick.

In 2004 Torres was named to USL All-League First Team, having scored 11 goals in 28 games with the Wave United. Torres was a member of the 2005 MISL championship Milwaukee Wave which swept the Cleveland Force in two games. He tore the MCL in his right knee during the 2005–2006 season. In 2010, he made his return to indoor soccer, with the Omaha Vipers of the MISL.

=== International ===
In 1997, Torres was a member of the third place team at the 1997 World University Games. Torres ended the tournament as the U.S. team's leading scorer with 5 goals. Torres has played for the U.S. Futsal team from 1999 to 2006, earning 13 caps and scoring 9 goals. He was the team leader with five goals at the 2004 FIFA Futsal World Championship.

== Coaching ==
Torres returned to Creighton in 2007 as a graduate assistant under then head coach Bob Warming. Torres finished his studies at Creighton that he started during his playing career, graduating with a bachelor's degree in sociology in May 2008. Torres was promoted to full-time assistant in 2008, and was named interim head coach on January 26, 2011, after Jamie Clark resigned as head coach of Creighton to take the same position at the University of Washington. Eventually Creighton hired Elmar Bolowich, relieving Torres of interim head coach duties. Torres was promoted to the head coaching position in 2018. He led the Bluejays to the College Cup in 2022.
