= Pedro Álvarez (footballer) =

Colombian footballer (born 1970)

Personal information
- Full name: Pedro Álvarez
- Date of birth: 5 May 1970 (age 56)
- Place of birth: Itagüí, Colombia
- Height: 1.77 m (5 ft 10 in)
- Position: Midfielder

Senior career*
Years	Team	Apps	(Gls)
1991–1995	Independiente Medellín		
1995–1996	Atlético Junior		
1996–2000	Atlético Nacional		
2000–2001	Envigado		
2001	MetroStars	21	(1)
2002	Once Caldas		
Total		21	(1)

International career
1994	Colombia	1	(0)
- * Club domestic league appearances and goals

Pedro Álvarez (born 5 May 1970) is a Colombian retired professional association football player.

== Biography ==
=== MetroStars ===
Pedro Álvarez was signed by the MetroStars after receiving an allocation from D.C. United in a trade between the clubs.

== Statistics ==
Club performance			League		Cup		League Cup		Continental		Total	
Season	Club	League	Apps	Goals	Apps	Goals	Apps	Goals	Apps	Goals	Apps	Goals
USA			League		Open Cup		League Cup		North America		Total	
2001	MetroStars	MLS	21	1	1	0	0	0	0	0	22	1
Career total			21	1	1	0	0	0	0	0	22	1
