= Matt Okoh =

American soccer player (born 1972)

Personal information
- Full name: Matthew Nwabueze Okoh
- Date of birth: May 19, 1972 (age 54)
- Place of birth: Washington, D.C., United States
- Height: 6 ft 2 in (1.88 m)
- Positions: Midfielder; forward

Team information
- Current team: FC Viktoria München (player/manager)

Youth career
- 1992–1995: University of Denver

Senior career*
| Years | Team | Apps | (Gls) |
| 1995 | Colorado Foxes | 20 | (5) |
| 1995 | Santos | | |
| 1996 | Wichita Wings (indoor) | 27 | (14) |
| 1996–1997 | SSV Reutlingen | | |
| 1997–1998 | 1860 Munich | 2 | (0) |
| 1998–1999 | SpVgg Unterhaching | 13 | (2) |
| 2000–2001 | Colorado Rapids | 21 | (2) |
| 2001 | New England Revolution | 18 | (6) |
| 2001–2002 | Campomaiorense | 10 | (2) |
| 2008 | SpVgg Bayern Hof | 8 | (1) |
| 2008 | SC Baldham-Vaterstetten | 10 | (9) |
| 2009 | SV-DJK Taufkirchen | | |
| 2011–2012 | FC Wacker München | | |
| 2012– | FC Viktoria München | | |

Managerial career
- 2000–2001: University of Denver (assistant)
- 2001: Nichols College
- 2002–2004: Grambling State University
- 2005–2007: Delaware State University
- 2006–2007: Delaware Dynasty
- 2008: SpVgg Bayern Hof (assistant)
- 2009: SV-DJK Taufkirchen
- 2009–2011: DSU Hornets Women (assistant)
- 2012–2014: FC Viktoria München
- 2012–: FC Viktoria München
- 2014–: JFG Region Eichstätt U17
- * Club domestic league appearances and goals

Matthew Nwabueze Okoh (born May 19, 1972) is a former U.S.-Nigerian soccer player and currently assistant coach of the DSU Hornets Women. His playing career spanned eight years and took him from the United States to Brazil, Germany and Portugal. Since retiring from playing, Okoh has devoted himself to coaching collegiate soccer.

== Playing career ==
=== Youth and college ===
While born in Washington, D.C., Okoh's family moved back to Asaba, Nigeria for several years. His family then returned to the U.S., this time settling in Denver. Okoh attended Regis Jesuit High School in Aurora, Colorado. After graduating from high school, Okoh remained in the Denver area, attending the University of Denver where he played men's soccer. He finished his collegiate career second on the team's career list of goals and points, having scored fifty goals in thirty-seven games. Okoh graduated with a bachelor's degree in mathematics in 1995.

=== Early career ===
In 1995, Okoh signed with the Colorado Foxes of the American Professional Soccer League (APSL) before moving to Brazilian club Santos that winter. He spent only half a season with Santos before returning to the U.S. to play the second half of the 1995–96 National Professional Soccer League (NPSL) season with the Wichita Wings.

=== Germany ===
In 1996, Okoh left the Wings and moved to Germany where he signed with German third division club SSV Reutlingen. Bundesliga club TSV 1860 Munich was suitably impressed with Okoh's performances and purchased his contract from Reutlingen. However, he lasted only one season, appearing in only two games, before transferring to SpVgg Unterhaching. He played the 1997–98 season with Unterhaching, scoring two goals in thirteen games before injuring his back in May 1998. This injury put him out of action for the remainder of the season and into the 1998–99 season. In December 1998, Okoh returned to the United States for rehabilitation. However, rehabilitation went slowly and he lost all of 1999. In January 2008, Okoh returned to Germany and joined the team of Bayern Hof in the Bayernliga. At the end of the 2007–08 season he quit.

=== Major League Soccer ===
In April 2000, Okoh went on trial with the Colorado Rapids. The team was sufficiently impressed with him to sign him as a discovery player. On March 19, 2001, the Colorado Rapids traded Okoh, along with Alan Woods and a second round 2002 draft pick to the New England Revolution for Imad Baba and Carlos Parra. The Revolution waived him on November 15, 2001.

=== Portugal ===
Following his release by New England, Okoh pursued a return to Europe. This led to him signing with Portuguese Second Division club S.C. Campomaiorense He spent the second half of the 2001–02 season in Portugal, then retired from playing professionally.

=== Return in Germany ===
In January 2008, he returned to Germany and made his debut for SpVgg Bayern Hof in the Bayernliga. In July 2008, he moved to SC Baldham-Vaterstetten and left the team after half a year to sign a player-coaching contract with league rival SV-DJK Taufkirchen.

== Coaching career ==
In 2000 while playing with the Rapids, Okoh joined the Colorado Legends Soccer Club as the Director of Player Development. At the same time, he served as an assistant coach to the University of Denver.

Then again in July 2001 while playing with the Revolution, Okoh was the head coach of the women's soccer team at Nichols College, a Division III college in Dudley, Massachusetts. He took the team to the finals of the Commonwealth Coast Conference Tournament before resigning in December 2001.

In 2002, Grambling State University hired Okoh to establish the school's first women's soccer team. In the Lady Tigers' first season, 2003, he coached the team to an 8–12–1 record. However, in 2004, he took the Lady Tigers to a 16–6 record. He resigned in January 2004 to pursue other coaching opportunities. That led to his being hired by Delaware State University in August 2005.

The Delaware Dynasty of the USL Premier Development League hired Okoh as its head coach on February 13, 2007.

In January 2008, he was named as assistant coach of SpVgg Bayern Hof, but left the team after six months. In January 2009, he became head coach of SV-DJK Taufkirchen. In July 2009, he signed a contract as assistant coach of DSU Hornets Women.
