= Winston Griffiths (footballer) =

Jamaican footballer (1978–2011)

Personal information
- Date of birth: 12 September 1978
- Place of birth: Saint Elizabeth Parish, Jamaica
- Date of death: 23 October 2011 (aged 33)
- Place of death: May Pen, Jamaica
- Height: 5 ft 10 in (1.78 m)
- Position: Midfielder

Youth career
- 1998–1999: University of Rhode Island

Senior career*
Years	Team	Apps	(Gls)
2001	Connecticut Wolves	25	(5)
2001	Galaxy FC		
2002	MetroStars	3	(0)
2002	Los Angeles Galaxy	6	(1)
2002	New England Revolution	8	(0)
2003–2004	Portmore United		
2004	Vancouver Whitecaps	23	(2)
2005–2006	Arnett Gardens		
2005	→ Toronto Lynx (loan)	4	(1)
2007	Portuguese Supra	2	(3)
2007–2008	Sporting Central	8	(2)
2010	London City		
2010–2011	Humble Lions		

International career
1998–2002	Jamaica	37	(3)
- * Club domestic league appearances and goals

Winston Griffiths (12 September 1978 – 23 October 2011) was a Jamaican professional footballer who played as a midfielder in the USL A-League, Jamaica National Premier League, Major League Soccer, South Central Confederation Super League, and the Canadian Soccer League. He also appeared for the Jamaica national team, and represented his country in the 1998, and 2000 CONCACAF Gold Cup tournaments.

== Club career ==
=== College ===
After leaving Jamaica's Glenmuir High, Griffiths played college soccer at the University of Rhode Island from 1998 to 1999, leading the team to the Atlantic-10 Conference regular season and tournament championships in 1999. He finished his career at URI with 42 points.

=== Professional ===
Nicknamed Fanna, he began his professional career with the Connecticut Wolves of the A-League. He returned to his native Jamaica to play for Galaxy FC, but his team was relegated from the Jamaica National Premier League. When the season ended he had an unsuccessful trial with Bolton Wanderers. In 2002, Griffiths was drafted by Dallas Burn of the Major League Soccer, but was traded to the MetroStars in exchange for D.J. Countess before the start of season. He made his debut on 23 March 2002 against New England Revolution. On 20 April 2002, he was traded to the Los Angeles Galaxy for a conditional SuperDraft pick, and appeared in six matches and recorded one goal.

He was waived from the roster and on 30 July 2002 he was signed by the New England Revolution. For the remainder of the season he helped New England secure the Eastern Conference title. He featured in the MLS Cup final against his former club the LA Galaxy where he nearly scored the match winner at the 112' minute to only hit the crossbar and allow the Galaxy to recover and record the winning goal a minute later. The following season he returned to Jamaica to play with Portmore United, where he won the league title and the JFF Champions Cup.

In 2004, he went abroad once more to return to the USL A-League to be signed by the Vancouver Whitecaps. Throughout his time in Vancouver he recorded two goals and five assists, and reached the Western Conference Finals. He returned home in 2005 to play with Arnett Gardens F.C., and returned to Canada on a loan to the Toronto Lynx. He made his debut on 30 April 2005 against Richmond Kickers. He recorded his first goal the following match in a 1–1 draw to the Virginia Beach Mariners.

In 2007, he had a third stint in Canada where he played with Portuguese Supra of the Canadian Soccer League. He made his debut for the club on 12 July 2007 in an Open Canada Cup match against the Canadian Lions. On 15 July 2007, he recorded a hat-trick in a 5–2 victory over the Lions. After a brief tenure with Supra he returned home to play in the South Central Confederation Super League with Sporting Central Academy, and secured a league title and promotion to the premier league. After a two-year absence from football he returned to the CSL in 2010 after London City signed him to a contract from a recommendation from former teammate Rick Titus. On 2 July 2010, he returned home in order to sort personal matters out. He finished off his career with Humble Lions in the premier league.

== International career ==
Griffiths made his debut for Jamaica in 1998 against Guatemala, and made his last international was in 2002 against Barbados, having played 28 times and scored twice for the Reggae Boyz. He scored his first international goal on 5 June 1999 in the 1999 Caribbean Cup against Guadeloupe. He featured in the 1998, and 2000 CONCACAF Gold Cup tournaments. Griffiths also played for Jamaica at the 1999 Pan American Games, scoring a goal versus Honduras in a 2–1 defeat.

== Death ==
On Sunday 23 October 2011, Griffiths was found in odd circumstances and later died in May Pen hospital, he was 33.

== Honours ==
New England Revolution

- Eastern Conference: 2002

Portmore United

- National Premier League: 2004–05
- JFF Champions Cup: 2004–05

Sporting Central Academy

- South Central Confederation Super League: 2007
