= Shaker Asad =

Palestinian former soccer midfielder

Personal information
- Full name: Shaker Suleiman Asad
- Date of birth: August 18, 1979 (age 47)
- Place of birth: Gaza, Gaza Strip
- Height: 5 ft 7 in (1.70 m)
- Position: Midfielder

College career
Years	Team	Apps	(Gls)
1997–1999	NC State Wolfpack		

Senior career*
Years	Team	Apps	(Gls)
2000–2001	New England Revolution	27	(1)
2000	→ Project-40 (loan)	16	(2)
2001	Miami Fusion	1	(0)
2002	New England Revolution	6	(0)
2002	→ Charleston Battery (loan)	1	(0)
2003	Atlanta Silverbacks	22	(6)

International career
2002–2004	Palestine	4	(1)
- * Club domestic league appearances and goals

Shaker Asad (born August 18, 1979) is a Palestinian former soccer midfielder who spent three seasons in Major League Soccer and one in the USL First Division. He also played for the Palestinian national team.

== Club career ==
=== Early career ===
Asad was born in the Gaza Strip, and grew up in Raleigh, North Carolina where he attended Athens Drive High School. Asad was second team All-ACC in 1998, and First Team All-ACC at N.C. State in 1999, when he led the Wolfpack with 19 points. Asad, who was regarded as one of the top midfielders in the ACC Conference, announced in January 2000 that he would forgo his final year of eligibility in order to make himself available for the MLS draft.

=== Professional ===
The New England Revolution of Major League Soccer (MLS) picked Asad in the third round (31st overall) in the 2000 MLS SuperDraft On February 4, 2000. He had a penalty saved in the 2000 U.S. Open Cup second round, en route to a 1-0 Revolution loss to the Mid Michigan Bucks. Asad made his MLS debut on June 21, 2000, in a 2–2 draw against the San Jose Earthquakes. In that match, he recorded his first professional assist, setting up Mauricio Wright's 91st-minute equalizing goal. Asad earned his first start on July 12, 2000, in a 4–1 loss to the Columbus Crew. Ultimately Asad saw minimal time in 2000, as the Revs loaned him to the MLS Project-40 team.

In 2001, Asad played in nineteen MLS matches for the Revolution, scoring his first MLS goal (and recording an assist) on June 20, 2001, in the 88th minute of a 3–3 overtime draw against the Colorado Rapids in front of 31,211 at Foxboro Stadium.

Asad had a successful 2001 U.S. Open Cup campaign, recording two goals and an assist in three matches played. Asad scored the opening goal of the Revolution's 7–1 victory over the Mid Michigan Bucks in the second round on June 27. He also scored the opening goal against the Charleston Battery in the tournament's third round on July 11.

On August 15, 2001, Asad, along with Johnny Torres, to the Miami Fusion in exchange for Leo Cullen. He played only one game with the Fusion (8 total minutes), which folded at the end of the season. On January 11, 2002, the Revolution drafted Asad for a second time, this time in the third round (22nd overall) of the 2002 MLS dispersal draft. He played in only six games with the Revolution, which loaned him to the Charleston Battery of the USL First Division. In August 2002, he was injured while playing on loan to the Kansas City Wizards in an exhibition game with the Rochester Raging Rhinos. The Revs placed Asad on waivers on November 4, 2002, and Asad moved to the Atlanta Silverbacks of the USL for the 2003 season. He is not recorded as playing after that.

== International ==
From 2002, Asad played several years with the Palestinian national team. His first game was a 1–1 tie with Jordan on February 16, 2002, and his last recorded game was a 2–1 loss to Iraq on June 19, 2004.

== Career statistics ==
=== International ===
Appearances and goals by national team and year
National team	Year	Apps	Goals
Palestine	2002	2	1
Palestine	2003	–	
Palestine	2004	2	0
Total		4	1

Scores and results list Palestine's goal tally first, score column indicates score after each Asad goal.

List of international goals scored by Shaker Asad
No.	Date	Venue	Opponent	Score	Result	Competition
1	25 December 2002	Al Kuwait Sports Club Stadium, Kuwait City, Kuwait	Kuwait	1–0	3–3	2002 Arab Cup
