= Alan Woods (soccer) =

American soccer player and coach

Personal information
- Date of birth: October 12, 1978 (age 48)
- Place of birth: Washington, D.C., United States
- Height: 6 ft 0 in (1.83 m)
- Position: Defender

Youth career
- 1996–1997: University of Notre Dame
- 1998–1999: Clemson

Senior career*
Years	Team	Apps	(Gls)
2000	Colorado Rapids	1	(0)
2000	Charleston Battery	27	(0)
2001	New England Revolution	18	(0)
2002–04	Atlanta Silverbacks	75	(5)
2005	Charleston Battery	10	(0)
2005–06	Virginia Beach Mariners	36	(2)

Managerial career
- Nichols College (assistant)
- 2008–: Oglethorpe University
- * Club domestic league appearances and goals

Alan Woods (born October 12, 1978) is a retired American soccer defender who played a season in Major League Soccer and six in the USL First Division. He is currently the coach of the Oglethorpe University women's team.

== Player ==
=== Youth ===
Woods attended Paint Branch High School where he was a 1995 All Met Honorable Mention soccer player. In 1996, he began his collegiate career at the University of Notre Dame where he was named to the Big East All-Rookie team and second team All Great Lakes Region. He transferred to Clemson in 1998 where he was first team All ACC and first team All South. In March 1998, Woods was called up to the United States men's national under-23 soccer team camp for its match against Canada.

=== Professional ===
The Colorado Rapids selected Woods in the first round (tenth overall) of the 2000 MLS SuperDraft, but waived him after the first game of the regular season in which he played five minutes. He then signed with the Charleston Battery of the USL A-League where he started 26 of 27 games and was named Battery Rookie of the year. In April 2001, the Rapids traded Matt Okoh and the rights to Woods to the New England Revolution in exchange for Imad Baba and Carlos Parra. The New England Revolution then signed Woods and he played eighteen games for them making the MLS team of the week once. In 2002, he joined the Atlanta Silverbacks of the USL First Division and spent three seasons with the team and was team captain for two. In 2003, he was team MVP and Second Team All-League. In September 2003, he went on trial with CSKA Sofia, but declined a contract. On February 18, 2005, he rejoined the Charleston Battery after returning from the US Men's National Team camp at the Home Depot Center, for its World Cup Qualifier against Trinidad & Tobago during the player labor dispute, signing a two-year contract. He played ten games, scoring one goal. On July 6, 2005, Woods moved to the Virginia Beach Mariners, playing the remainder of the 2005 as well as the 2006 season where he was named the Mariners Defensive MVP.

== Coach ==
Woods coached the Cape Henry High School soccer team for one season. He was an assistant coach at Nichols College for one season. In 2008, he was hired as the head coach for the Oglethorpe University women's soccer team and the head coach for the Roswell Santos soccer academy. At Santos he coached the U-13 girls Blue team. In 2009, he was hired as the Concorde Fire Soccer Academy coach where he coached the U-14 girls central team and the U-14 central black team. He is currently coaching the 2011 Girls ECNL team at UFA, United Futbol Academy in Forsyth Georgia.
