= Leo Cullen (soccer) =

American soccer player

Personal information
- Date of birth: February 28, 1976 (age 50)
- Place of birth: Minneapolis, Minnesota, US
- Height: 5 ft 10 in (1.78 m)
- Position: Defender

College career
Years	Team	Apps	(Gls)
1994–1997	Maryland Terrapins		

Senior career*
Years	Team	Apps	(Gls)
1998–2001	Miami Fusion	93	(1)
2001–2003	New England Revolution	58	(2)
2005	Colorado Rapids	15	(0)
Total		166	(3)

International career
- United States U16
- United States U20
1999–2002	United States	3	(0)

Managerial career
- 2006–2009: Maryland Terrapins (assistant)
- 2010–: Army Black Knights (assistant)
- * Club domestic league appearances and goals

Leo Cullen (born February 28, 1976) is an American retired soccer defender who spent seven seasons in Major League Soccer and earned three caps with the United States men's national soccer team.

== Player ==
Cullen played college soccer at the University of Maryland from 1994 to 1997. He was the 1997 ACC Player of the Year and a 1997 First-Team All-American.

=== Professional ===
On February 2, 1998, the Miami Fusion made Cullen the first draft pick in team history, taking him first overall in the 1998 MLS College Draft. Cullen spent the next three and a half seasons in Miami (he left the team as the club's all-time leader in games and minutes). On August 15, 2001, the Fusion traded Cullen and a 2002 first-round draft pick to the New England Revolution in exchange for Johnny Torres, Shaker Asad and a 2003 second-round draft pick. Cullen remained with the Revolution through the 2003 season. After taking 2004 off to pursue his college degree, Cullen came back to MLS in 2005, his rights traded to the Colorado Rapids. He retired from soccer after playing one season with the Rapids. Cullen played a few times with DC United reserves in 2006 as a defender in an emergency capacity.

=== International ===
Cullen earned three caps for the United States men's national soccer team, his first coming February 21, 1999 against Chile. He came on for Richie Williams in the 86th minute of a 2–1 victory. His second game was a 2–2 tie with Jamaica on September 8, 1999. Cullen played the entire game. His last game was a 2–0 victory over El Salvador on November 17, 2002. In this game, Cullen came on for Pablo Mastroeni at halftime.

== Coach ==
At the MLS Superdraft, Maurice Edu (the first pick) announced that Cullen was his agent. On March 13, 2006, the University of Maryland hired Cullen as an assistant with the women's soccer team. On January 7, 2010, Cullen was named the men's assistant coach at the United States Military Academy at West Point, NY. Cullen and new Army head coach, Russell Payne, were teammates at the University of Maryland.

== Honors ==
Individual

- MLS All-Star: 1999
