= Wolde Harris =

Jamaican footballer (born 1974)

Personal information
- Full name: Wolde Selassie Amefika Jaha Harris
- Date of birth: 26 January 1974 (age 52)
- Place of birth: Kingston, Jamaica
- Height: 5 ft 10 in (1.78 m)
- Position: Striker

Team information
- Current team: Toronto FC (assistant)

College career
Years	Team	Apps	(Gls)
1994–1995	Clemson Tigers		

Senior career*
Years	Team	Apps	(Gls)
1996	Colorado Foxes	27	(17)
1997–1999	Colorado Rapids	83	(26)
2000–2003	New England Revolution	91	(24)
2003	Kansas City Wizards	10	(0)
2004	Charleston Battery	8	(2)
2004	Bodens BK	17	(4)
2005	Colorado Rapids	10	(1)
2006–2009	FAS		
2009–2012	Winnipeg Alliance		

International career
1997–2002	Jamaica	28	(7)

Managerial career
- 2010: Kingston College (assistant)
- 2011: Clemson Tigers (student assistant)
- 2015–2020: Colorado Springs Switchbacks (assistant)
- 2019: Colorado Springs Switchbacks (interim)
- 2021–2025: Colorado Rapids (assistant)
- 2025–2026: Toronto FC (assistant)
- * Club domestic league appearances and goals

Wolde Selassie Harris (born 26 January 1974) is a Jamaican football coach and former player. He played as a striker in Major League Soccer and was the 1996 A-League MVP & Rookie of the Year. He earned twenty-eight caps with the Jamaica national team.

== Club career ==
Harris played college soccer for his freshman year at the University of Connecticut and then transferred to Clemson University, leaving as the college's all-time leading scorer with 76 goals in three years. He joined MLS for the first time in 1997, after spending 1996 with the Colorado Foxes, leading the A-League in goals with 17. Harris played three seasons with the Colorado Rapids, scoring 13 goals in 1998.

=== New England Revolution ===
On 6 February 2000, Harris, along with a third round pick in the 2000 MLS SuperDraft, were acquired by the New England Revolution from the Colorado Rapids in exchange for New England’s first- and second-round picks in the 2000 MLS SuperDraft. Harris made his Revolution debut in the season opener of the 2000 New England Revolution season on 18 March 2000 against the Miami Fusion. He scored his first Revolution goal on 1 April against the LA Galaxy, and made his home debut on 15 April, in the Revolution's home opener against D.C. United. Wolde's best season with the Revs was his first, when he scored 15 goals and recorded 7 assists, finishing the season as the Revolution's scoring champion. He also led the team in matches played and matches started. For his efforts, Harris was named Revolution Most Valuable Player for the 2000 season. He additionally claimed MLS Player of the Week honors for week 19. Harris' production tailed off in the 2001 season, recording only 3 goals and 5 assists in 21 games played. In 2002, Harris would start only 11 matches for the Revolution, recording 4 goals.

Perhaps Harris' most famous moment for the Revolution came during the 2003 season, when, on 28 June, in a 3-2 home victory over the Colorado Rapids, he sent a 5th minute bicycle kick passed Rapids keeper Scott Garlick, only for referee Noel Kenny to rule the goal hadn't crossed the line. The "goal that wasn't a goal" was considered what would've been a candidate for MLS Goal of the Year and one of the best goals in league history. Harris recorded a consolation goal 2 minutes later.

In total, Harris would spend three-and-a-half seasons in New England, before a trade to the Kansas City Wizards midway through 2003. The deal saw the Revolution acquire strikers Darío Fabbro and Chris Brown from the Kansas City Wizards in exchange for Harris, Jorge Vazquez, and a conditional SuperDraft pick.

=== Later career ===
He spent 2004 with Swedish club Bodens BK before coming back to MLS and Colorado in 2005. In eight years in MLS league play, Harris scored 51 goals and added 31 assists. He signed for Salvadoran outfit Club Deportivo FAS in August 2006 and retired at the end of the season.

== International career ==
Harris has also played for the Jamaica national team, earning over 25 caps and scoring 7 goals. He participated in world cup qualifiers, tournaments, and numerous friendlies. He played his last international game against Guadeloupe in 2002 in the Caribbean Cup where the Reggae Boyz were crowned Champions.

== Coaching career ==
Wolde Harris has been involved in youth football in the United States and Jamaica. In December 2009, he launch a company called Jamaica Grassroots football company with his father and brothers. Harris and along with his father and two brothers also coached at traditional Jamaican football powerhouse, Kingston College. Harris joined the staff of Clemson University in 2011 as a student assistant coach and continued to help the Tigers through 2012.

On 26 February 2021, Harris joined Major League Soccer side Colorado Rapids as an assistant coach.

After four years with the Rapids, Harris joined Toronto FC as an assistant coach.

== Personal life ==
Wolde Harris is the son of Kingston College, Michigan State University and Jamaica soccer legend, Trevor "Jumpy" Harris.

== Career statistics ==
=== International ===
Scores and results list Jamaica's goal tally first, score column indicates score after each Harris goal.

List of international goals scored by Wolde Harris
No.	Date	Venue	Opponent	Score	Result	Competition
1	27 August 2000	Truman Bodden Sports Complex, George Town, Cayman Islands	Cayman Islands	2–0	6–0	Friendly
2	27 August 2000	Truman Bodden Sports Complex, George Town, Cayman Islands	Cayman Islands	3–0	6–0	Friendly
3	27 August 2000	Truman Bodden Sports Complex, George Town, Cayman Islands	Cayman Islands	5–0	6–0	Friendly
4	17 May 2001	Hasely Crawford Stadium, Port of Spain, Trinidad and Tobago	Trinidad and Tobago	1–0	1–2	2001 Caribbean Cup
5	19 May 2001	Hasely Crawford Stadium, Port of Spain, Trinidad and Tobago	Barbados	1–0	2–1	2001 Caribbean Cup
