= 2004 New England Revolution season =

New England Revolution
2004 season
- Owner: Robert Kraft (The Kraft Group)
- Head coach: Steve Nicol
- Stadium: Gillette Stadium; Foxborough, Massachusetts
- MLS: Conference: 4th Overall: 9th
- MLS Cup Playoffs: Eastern conference finals
- U.S. Open Cup: Fourth round
- Top goalscorer: Pat Noon (11g)
- Average home league attendance: 12,226
- Biggest win: 6–1 (September 18 vs. Colorado Rapids)
- Biggest defeat: 3–1 (T3)

The 2004 New England Revolution season was the ninth season for the New England Revolution both as a club and in Major League Soccer (MLS). The club reached the playoffs after finishing fourth in the Eastern Conference (MLS). The club also reached the Eastern conference final, where they lost to D.C. United on penalty kicks. Additionally, they club participated in the U.S. Open Cup, where they were eliminated by the Rochester Rhinos in the fourth round.

== Summary ==
The Revolution entered 2004 by extending head coach Steve Nicol’s contract for two years, and re-signing Jay Heaps, Chris Brown, and Brian Kamler.

In the 2004 MLS SuperDraft, the Revolution selected four players: Clint Dempsey, Jeremiah White, Felix Brillant, and Andy Dorman. On February 5, 2004, the club named legendary England striker Paul Mariner as assistant coach, and also Peter Simonini as goalkeeper coach. The club played its first competitive match on April 3, 2004, dropping a 3-2 result to the LA Galaxy. The Revolution struggled throughout the first half of the season, recording only three wins in their first 15 matches, recording only their third win of the year on June 2 thanks to a Pat Noonan hattrick. before going on a seven-match unbeaten run during the months of July and August. The club finished the season sub-.500, with a record of 8 wins, 13 losses, and 9 draws, but nevertheless qualified for the playoffs on the last day of the season courtesy of a 2-1 victory over the Chicago Fire, who they beat out for the final playoff berth. In the 2004 Eastern Conference Semifinals, the Revolution defeated the Supporters' Shield-holding Columbus Crew 2-1 on aggregate, (thanks in part to two penalty kick saves from Matt Reis), before losing the Eastern Conference Finals in penalties to eventual-champions D.C. United. The Eastern Conference final, played in front of 21,201 at RFK Stadium, is widely considered one of the best MLS games of all time.

== Squad ==
=== First team squad ===
The New England Revolution's 2004 roster adapted from the document "Club History: All-Time Results."

Note: Flags indicate national team as defined under FIFA eligibility rules; some limited exceptions apply. Players may hold more than one non-FIFA nationality.

No.	Pos.	Nation	Player
7	MF	URU	José Cancela
25	MF	WAL	Andy Dorman
6	DF	USA	Jay Heaps
21	MF	GRN	Shalrie Joseph
3	DF	USA	Rusty Pierce
11	FW	USA	Pat Noonan
1	GK	USA	Matt Reis
27	FW	CAN	Félix Brillant
32	FW	NGA	Perek Belleh
20	FW	USA	Taylor Twellman
12	DF	ENG	Steve Howey
2	MF	USA	Clint Dempsey
8	DF	USA	Joe Franchino

No.	Pos.	Nation	Player
4	DF	TRI	Avery John
22	MF	USA	Marshall Leonard
15	MF	IRL	Richie Baker
14	MF	USA	Steve Ralston
26	GK	USA	Kyle Singer
23	MF	USA	Luke Vercollone
5	MF	USA	Brian Kamler
9	FW	USA	Joe-Max Moore
24	GK	USA	Adin Brown
12	DF	MLI	Daouda Kanté
30	GK	USA	Doug Warren
33	MF	USA	Bobby Thompson
18	DF	USA	Carlos Llamosa

== Transfers ==
New England Revolution – 2004 Transfers In
Name	Position	Date	Method	Fee	Previous club	Reference
Clint Dempsey	MF	January 16, 2004	2004 MLS SuperDraft	N/A	Furman Paladins men's soccer	
Jeremiah White	FW	January 16, 2004	SuperDraft	N/A	South Jersey Barons	
Félix Brillant	FW	January 16, 2004	SuperDraft	N/A	Cape Cod Crusaders	
Andy Dorman	MF	January 16, 2004	SuperDraft	N/A	Boston University Terriers	
Ritchie Baker	MF	February 5, 2004	Undisclosed	N/A	Shelbourne F.C.	
Luke Vercollone	MF	April 24, 2004	Undisclosed	N/A	Cape Cod Crusaders	
Avery John	MF	May 20, 2004	Undisclosed	N/A	Longford Town F.C.	
Bobby Thompson	MF	July 1, 2004	Undisclosed	N/A	Boston College	
Doug Warren	GK	July 10, 2004	Added from MLS Goalkeeper Pool	N/A	DC United	
Perek Belleh	FW	July 20, 2004	Undisclosed	N/A	RNYFC	
Steve Howey	DF	August 26, 2004	Undisclosed	N/A	Bolton Wanderers F.C.	

New England Revolution – 2004 Transfers In
Name	Position	Date	Method	Fee	Next Club	Reference
Jason Moore	MF	February 10, 2004	Waived	N/A	N/A	
Chris Brown	FW	April 8, 2004	Traded	"Future Considerations"	San Jose Earthquakes	
Kyle Singer	GK	April 24, 2004	Loan	N/A	New Hampshire Phantoms	
Daouda Kanté	DF	August 3, 2004	Waived	N/A	St. Louis Steamers	
Steve Howey	DF	November 26, 2004	Waived	N/A	Hartlepool United F.C.	
Richie Baker	MF	November 26, 2004	Waived	N/A	Shelbourne F.C.	

== League and team awards ==
New England Revolution – 2004 League Awards
Award	Player(s)	Winner / Finalist	Reference
MLS Rookie of the Year	Clint Dempsey	Winner	
MLS Player of the Week	Pat Noonan (wk 10)	Winner	
MLS Goal of the Week	Joe Franchino (week 5), Steve Ralston (week 15, week 29)	Winner	
MLS Goal of the Year	Steve Ralston	finalist	

New England Revolution – 2004 Team Awards
Award	Player(s)	Winner / Finalist	Reference
Revolution Most Valuable Player	Steve Ralston	Winner	
Revolution Scoring Champion	Pat Noonan (30pts, 11G, 8A	Winner	
Revolution Defender of the Year	Matt Reis	Winner	
Revolution Humanitarian of the Year	Brian Kamler	Winner	

== Standings ==
=== Eastern Conference ===
Pos	Team	Pld	W	L	T	GF	GA	GD	Pts	Qualification
1	Columbus Crew	30	12	5	13	40	32	+8	49	MLS Cup Playoffs
2	D.C. United	30	11	10	9	43	42	+1	42	MLS Cup Playoffs
3	MetroStars	30	11	12	7	47	49	−2	40	MLS Cup Playoffs
4	New England Revolution	30	8	13	9	42	43	−1	33	MLS Cup Playoffs
5	Chicago Fire	30	8	13	9	36	44	−8	33	

Source: MLS

=== Overall standings ===
Pos	Team	Pld	W	L	T	GF	GA	GD	Pts	Qualification
1	Columbus Crew (S)	30	12	5	13	40	32	+8	49	
2	Kansas City Wizards	30	14	9	7	38	30	+8	49	CONCACAF Champions' Cup
3	Los Angeles Galaxy	30	11	9	10	42	40	+2	43	
4	D.C. United (C)	30	11	10	9	43	42	+1	42	CONCACAF Champions' Cup
5	Colorado Rapids	30	10	9	11	29	32	−3	41	
6	MetroStars	30	11	12	7	47	49	−2	40	
7	San Jose Earthquakes	30	9	10	11	41	35	+6	38	
8	Dallas Burn	30	10	14	6	34	45	−11	36	
9	New England Revolution	30	8	13	9	42	43	−1	33	
10	Chicago Fire	30	8	13	9	36	44	−8	33	

Source: MLS
Rules for classification: 1) points; 2) head-to-head record; 3) goal difference; 4) number of goals scored
(C) Champions; (S) Supporters' Shield

== Results ==
=== Non-competitive ===
May 19, 2004 Friendly	New England Revolution	2–1	Sporting CP	Foxborough, Massachusetts
7:00 PM	Clint Dempsey 54'; Steve Ralston 82' (pen.)	Report	Marius Niculae 40'; Joao Pinto (red card) 52'; Paulo Bento (red card) 75'; Elpidio Filho (red card) 89'	Stadium: Gillette Stadium; Referee: Erich Simmons

=== 2004 U.S. Open Cup ===
July 20, 2004	(New York (state)) Rochester Raging Rhinos (A-League)	1–1 (asdet) (3–1 p)	(Massachusetts) New England Revolution (MLS)	Ludlow, Massachusetts
	Wilson 61'	(Report)	Noonan 7'	Stadium: Lusitano Stadium; Attendance: 1,585; Referee: Ricardo Salazar (USA)
	Penalties
	Miller (penalty missed); Dammin (penalty scored); Aguilera (penalty scored); Mendes (penalty scored)		(penalty missed) Heaps; (penalty scored) Twellman; (penalty missed) Dempsey; (penalty missed) Noonan

=== Regular season ===
April 3, 2004 1	LA Galaxy	3–2	New England Revolution	Carson, California
	Carlos Ruiz 30'; Andreas herzog 59'; Jovan Kirovski 69'	Report	Rusty Pierce (yellow card) 38'; Jay Heaps 48'; Pat Noonan 68'; Daouda Kante (yellow card) 74'	Stadium: Home Depot Center; Attendance: 25,152; Referee: Alex Prus

April 17, 2004 2	New England Revolution	1–3	San Jose Earthquakes	Foxborough, Massachusetts
	Joe Franchino (yellow card) 17'; Pat Noonan (yellow card) 24'; Taylor Twellman 49'; Steve Ralston (yellow card) 54'	Report	Brian mullan (yellow card) 14'; Dwayne De Rosario 53'; Arturo Alvarez 55'; Ronnie Ekelund (yellow card) 72'; Brian Ching 73'	Stadium: Gillette Stadium; Attendance: 16,203; Referee: Ricardo Salazar

April 25, 2004 3	MetroStars	1–1	New England Revolution	East Rutherford, New Jersey
	Amado Guevara 14'	Report	Clint Dempsey 12'; Shalrie Joseph (yellow card) 31'; Joe-Max Moore (yellow card) 68'	Stadium: Giants Stadium; Attendance: 8,129; Referee: Kevin Stott

May 1, 2004 4	New England Revolution	2–1	LA Galaxy	Foxborough, Massachusetts
	Joe Franchino 4'; Jay Heaps (yellow card) 52'; Jose Cancela 71' (pen.)	Report	Carlos Ruiz (yellow card) 27'; Chris Albright (yellow card) 42'; Ned Grabavoy (yellow card) 65'; Marcelo Saragosa (yellow card) 86'; Ryan Suarez (yellow card) 90+2'; Alejandro Moreno 90+6'	Stadium: Gillette Stadium; Attendance: 13,811; Referee: Kevin Terry

May 7, 2004 5	Colorado Rapids	0–0	New England Revolution	Denver, Colorado
	Nat Borchers (yellow card) 70'	Report	Marshall Leonard (yellow card) 45'; Shalrie Joseph (red card) 75'	Stadium: Invesco Field at Mile High; Attendance: 7,784; Referee: Jair Marrufo

May 15, 2004 6	Columbus Crew	1–0	New England Revolution	Columbus, Ohio
	Edson Buddle 41'; Stephen Herdsman (yellow card) 54'; Nelson Akwari (yellow card) 59'	Report	Clint Dempsey (yellow card) 48'	Stadium: Columbus Crew Stadium; Attendance: 16,694; Referee: Michael Kennedy

May 22, 2004 7	New England Revolution	1–1	MetroStars	Foxborough, Massachusetts
	Pat Noonan 7'; Brian Kamler (yellow card) 39'; Clint Dempsey (yellow card) 45'	Report	Cornell Glen 55'; Amado Guevara (yellow card) 62'	Stadium: Gillette Stadium; Attendance: 10,108; Referee: Baldomero Toledo

May 29, 2004 8	New England Revolution	0–1	D.C. United	Foxborough, Massachusetts
	Shalrie Joseph (yellow card) 12'	Report	Brian Kamler 5' (o.g.); Brian Carroll (yellow card) 32'; Josha Gros (yellow card) 38'	Stadium: Gillette Stadium; Attendance: 19,314; Referee: Kevin Terry

June 2, 2004 9	Kansas City Wizards	2–3	New England Revolution	Foxborough, Massachusetts
	Josh Wolff 33'; Davy Arnaud 37'; Kerry Zavagnin (yellow card) 61'; Nick Garcia (yellow card) 88'	Report	Pat Noonan 16' 86' 90'; Avery John (yellow card) 28'; Jay Heaps (yellow card) 71'; Marshall Leonard (yellow card) 87'	Stadium: Gillette Stadium; Attendance: 8,014; Referee: Ramon Hernandez

June 6, 2004 10	New England Revolution	1–2	Columbus Crew	Foxborough, Massachusetts
	Jose Cancela 62' (pen.); Avery John (yellow card) 67'; Jay Heaps (yellow card) 67'	Report	Frankie Hejduk 53'; Jeff Cunningham 68' (pen.)	Stadium: Gillette Stadium; Attendance: 7,047; Referee: Ricardo Salazar

June 12, 2004 11	Dallas Burn	3–1	New England Revolution	Dallas, Texas
	Jason Kreis 12'; Simo Valakari (yellow card) 32' (red card) 89'; Eddie Johnson 74'; Toni Nhleko 84'	Report	Clint Dempsey 52'; Joe Franchino (red card) 89'	Stadium: Cotton Bowl; Attendance: 6,941; Referee: Alex Prus

June 19, 2004 12	New England Revolution	1–3	Kansas City Wizards	Foxborough, Massachusetts
	Clint Dempsey 74'; Marshall Leonard (yellow card) 81'	Report	Davy Arnaud 41'; Alex Zotinca (yellow card) 53'; Diego Gutierrez (yellow card) 66'; Matt Taylor 70' 90+3'	Stadium: Gillette Stadium; Attendance: 10,038; Referee: Michael Kennedy

June 26, 2004 13	New England Revolution	2–1	MetroStars	Foxborough, Massachusetts
	Clint Dempsey (yellow card) 21'; Avery John (yellow card) 28'; Joe Franchino (yellow card) 45'; Felix Brillant 64'; Clint Dempsey 67'; Richie Baker (yellow card) 79'; Pat Noonan (yellow card) 90+1'	Report	Pablo Brenes (yellow card) 36'; Ricardo Clark (yellow card) 71'; Amado Guevara (yellow card) 84' (goal) 90'	Stadium: Gillette Stadium; Attendance: 9,891; Referee: Ramon Hernandez

July 4, 2004 14	Colorado Rapids	1–0	New England Revolution	Denver, Colorado
	Alberto Delgado 75'	Report		Stadium: Invesco Field at Mile High; Attendance: 41,979; Referee: Kevin Terry

July 11, 2004 15	Chicago Fire FC	1–1	New England Revolution	Chicago, Illinois
	Damani Ralph (yellow card) 23' (goal) 49' (pen.); C.J. Brown (yellow card) 90+1'	Report	Marshall Leonard (yellow card) 41'; Steve Ralston 50'	Stadium: Soldier Field; Attendance: 39,529; Referee: Jair Marrufo

July 14, 2004 16	New England Revolution	3–1	Chicago Fire FC	Foxborough, Massachusetts
	Clint Dempsey 47'; Taylor Twellman 51' 67' (red card) 90'	Report	Scott Buete (yellow card) 10' (red card) 90+1'; Andy Williams 40' (yellow card) 60'; C.J. Brown (yellow card) 45'; Orlando Perez (yellow card) 58'	Stadium: Gillette Stadium; Attendance: 9,634; Referee: Alex Prus

July 17, 2004 17	Columbus Crew	1–1	New England Revolution	Columbus, Ohio
	Kyle Martino (yellow card) 45'; Chris Wingert (yellow card) 56'; Simon Eliott (yellow card) 58'; Edson Buddle (yellow card) 70'	Report	Clint Dempsey 31'; Richie Baker (yellow card) 42'; Avery John (yellow card) 64'	Stadium: Columbus Crew Stadium; Attendance: 13,373; Referee: Abbey Okulaja

July 24, 2004 18	San Jose Earthquakes	2–2	New England Revolution	San Jose, California
	Troy Dakay (red card) 62'; Richard Mulrooney (yellow card) 79'; Landon Donovan 90+1' (yellow card) 90+4'; Brian Ching 90+4'	Report	Pat Noonan 25'; Jose Cancela 54'; Steve Ralston (yellow card) 62'; Joe Franchino (yellow card) 70'; Shalrie Joseph (yellow card) 79'; Marshall Leonard (yellow card) 80'	Stadium: Spartan Stadium; Attendance: 9,062; Referee: Andrew Chapin

August 7, 2004 19	New England Revolution	2–2	Columbus Crew	Foxborough, Massachusetts
	Steve Ralston 28' (pen.) (yellow card) 45'; Pat Noonan 45+3'	Report	Edson Buddle (yellow card) 19' (goal) 45+1'; Kyle Martino 20'	Stadium: Gillette Stadium; Attendance: 9,156; Referee: Kevin Terry

August 11, 2004 20	Dallas Burn	0–3	New England Revolution	Dallas, Texas
	Clarence Goodson (yellow card) 90+1'	Report	Pat Noonan 3'; Taylor Twellman 87'; Andy Dorman 90+4'	Stadium: Cotton Bowl; Attendance: 5,104; Referee: Michael Kennedy

August 14, 2004 21	D.C. United	2–2	New England Revolution	Washington, D.C.
	Jaime Moreno 39' 56'; Ben Olsen (yellow card) 79'	Report	Avery John (yellow card) 25'; Steve Ralston 38'; Rusty Pierce (yellow card) 71' Andy Dorman 85'	Stadium: RFK Stadium; Attendance: 13,298; Referee: Baldomero Toledo

August 21, 2004 22	New England Revolution	1–2	Kansas City Wizards	Foxborough, Massachusetts
	Taylor Twellman 11'	Report	Josh Wolff 39'; Shavar Thomas (yellow card) 45+1'; Davey Arnaud 66'; Kerry Zavagnin (yellow card) 73'; Bo Oshoniyi (yellow card) 90+1'	Stadium: Gillette Stadium; Attendance: 7,410; Referee: Ricardo Valenzuela

August 28, 2004 23	D.C. United	0–0	New England Revolution	Washington, D.C.
	Joshua Gros (yellow card) 35'	Report		Stadium: RFK Stadium; Attendance: 17,236; Referee: Terry Vaughn

September 4, 2004 24	New England Revolution	0–1	San Jose Earthquakes	Foxborough, Massachusetts
	Marshall Leonard (yellow card) 41'	Report	Chris Brown 48'; Troy Dayak (yellow card) 57'	Stadium: Gillette Stadium; Attendance: 25,266; Referee: Michael Kennedy

September 11, 2004 25	MetroStars	3–2	New England Revolution	East Rutherford, New Jersey
	Mike Magee 31' (pen.); Jeff Parke (yellow card) 45'; Eddie Gaven 45+3'; Cornell Glen 68'	Report	Pat Noonan 5'; Taylor Twellman 14'; Avery John (yellow card) 39'; Clint Dempsey (yellow card) 71'	Stadium: Giants Stadium; Attendance: 12,333; Referee: Michael Kennedy

September 18, 2004 26	New England Revolution	6–1	Colorado Rapids	Foxborough, Massachusetts
	Steve Ralston 27' 36' (pen.); Taylor Twellman 28' 71'; Pat Noonan 41' 50'	Report	Peguero Jean Phillippe 17' (yellow card) 54'	Stadium: Gillette Stadium; Attendance: 7,994; Referee: Jair Marrufo

September 25, 2004 27	Chicago Fire FC	2–0	New England Revolution	Chicago, Illinois
	Andy Herron 7' 77'; Chris Armas (yellow card) 55'; Andy Williams (yellow card) 80'	Report	Jay Heaps (yellow card) 54'; Clint Dempsey (yellow card) 68'	Stadium: Soldier Field; Attendance: 20,383; Referee: Kevin Stott

October 2, 2004 28	New England Revolution	2–0	Dallas Burn	Foxborough, Massachusetts
	Taylor Twellman 42'; Marshall Leonard (yellow card) 45+1'; Steve Ralston 47'	Report	Eric Quill (yellow card) 12': Ronnie O'Brien (yellow card) 37'; Carey Talley (yellow card) 90'; Cory Gibbs (yellow card) 90+2'	Stadium: Gillette Stadium; Attendance: 10,141; Referee: Alex Prus

October 9, 2004 29	D.C. United	1–0	New England Revolution	Washington, D.C.
	Christian Gomez 32'; Josh Gros (yellow card) 54'; Dema Kovalenko (yellow card) 61' (red card) 74'	Report	Pat Noonan (yellow card) 41'; Brian Kamler (yellow card) 57'; Avery John (yellow card) 73'	Stadium: RFK Stadium; Attendance: 19,461; Referee: Marcel Yonan

October 16, 2004 30	New England Revolution	2–1	Chicago Fire FC	Foxborough, Massachusetts
	Taylor Twellman (yellow card) 22'; Clint Dempsey (yellow card) 45+1' (goal) 55'; Steve Ralston 58'; Rusty Pierce (yellow card) 61'	Report	Nate Jaqua 56'; C.J. Brown (yellow card) 57'; Jesse Marsch (yellow card) 69'	Stadium: Gillette Stadium; Attendance: 10,136; Referee: Ricardo Valenzuela

=== MLS Cup Playoffs ===
October 23, 2004 Conference Semis Leg 1	New England Revolution	1–0	Columbus Crew	Foxborough, Massachusetts
19:30	Shalrie Joseph (yellow card) 4'; Avery John 25' (yellow card) 58'; Jay Heaps (yellow card) 82'	Report	Edson Buddle (yellow card) 26'; Robin Fraser (yellow card) 35'	Stadium: Gillette Stadium; Attendance: 5,679; Referee: Michael Kennedy

October 31, 2004 Conference Semis Leg 2	Columbus Crew	1–1 (1–2 agg.)	New England Revolution	Columbus, Ohio
17:00	Kyle Martino (yellow card) 26'; Frankie Hejduk (yellow card) 68'; Edson Buddle 90+2'	Report	Taylor Twellman 81'	Stadium: Historic Crew Stadium; Attendance: 15,224; Referee: Alex Prus

November 6, 2004 Eastern Conference Final	D.C. United	3–3 (a.e.t.) (4–3 p)	New England Revolution	Washington, D.C.
17:00	Alecko Eskandarian 11' (yellow card) 49'; Bryan Namoff (yellow card) 58'; Jaime Moreno 21'; Christian Gómez 67'; Ben Olsen (yellow card) 87'	Report	Shalrie Joseph (yellow card) 1'; Taylor Twellman 17'; Steve Ralston 44' (pen.); Avery John (yellow card) 55'; Rusty Pierce (yellow card) 62'; Pat Noonan 85'	Stadium: RFK Stadium; Attendance: 21,201; Referee: Terry Vaughn
	Penalties
	Ben Olsen (penalty missed); Santino Quaranta (penalty scored); Freddy Adu (penalty scored); Alecko Eskandarian (penalty scored); Jaime Moreno (penalty missed); Brian Carroll (penalty scored)		Steve Ralston (penalty missed); Matt Reis (penalty scored); Taylor Twellman (penalty scored); Jay Heaps (penalty missed); Shalrie Joseph (penalty scored); Clint Dempsey (penalty missed)
