= 2003 New England Revolution season =

New England Revolution
2003 season
- Owner: Robert Kraft (The Kraft Group)
- Head coach: Steve Nicol
- Stadium: Gillette Stadium; Foxborough, Massachusetts
- MLS: Conference: 2nd Overall: 3rd
- MLS Cup Playoffs: Semifinals
- U.S. Open Cup: Quarterfinals
- Champions Cup: Round of 16
- Top goalscorer: League: Pat Noonan (15g); All: Pat Noonan (15g)
- Highest home attendance: 33,652 (July 12 v. MetroStars)
- Lowest home attendance: 8,594 (September 28 v. Columbus Crew
- Average home league attendance: 14,641
- Biggest win: 5–1 (August 30 v. Chicago Fire)
- Biggest defeat: 4–1 (June 14 v. Colorado Rapids)

The 2003 New England Revolution season was the eighth season for the New England Revolution both as a club and in Major League Soccer (MLS). The club reached the playoffs after finishing second in the Eastern conference. The club was eliminated in the final of the 2002 MLS Cup. Additionally, they participated in the CONCACAF Champions Cup for the first time in their history, where they were eliminated in the round of 16 against Liga Deportiva Alajuelense. Additionally, they reached the quarterfinals of the U.S. Open Cup.

== First team squad ==
Based on squad statistics retrieved from 2024 New England Revolution Media Guide (pg. 275)

Note: Flags indicate national team as defined under FIFA eligibility rules; some limited exceptions apply. Players may hold more than one non-FIFA nationality.

No.	Pos.	Nation	Player
20	FW	USA	Taylor Twellman
11	FW	USA	Pat Noonan
5	MF	USA	Brian Kamler
9	FW	USA	Joe-Max Moore
14	MF	USA	Steve Ralston
13	MF/FW	USA	Chris Brown
7	MF	URU	José Cancela
6	DF	USA	Jay Heaps
8	DF	USA	Joe Franchino
13	FW	JAM	Wolde Harris
21	MF	GRN	Shalrie Joseph
33	FW	ARG	Dario Fabbro
2	MF	USA	Leo Cullen

No.	Pos.	Nation	Player
7	MF	USA	Daniel Hernández
10	MF	ARG	Jorge Gabriel Vázquez
27	FW	USA	Chris Bagley
24	GK	USA	Adin Brown
12	DF	MLI	Daouda Kanté
4	FW	MLI	Ibrahim Kante
22	DF	USA	Marshall Leonard
18	DF	USA	Carlos Llamosa
16	MF	USA	Jason Moore
3	DF	USA	Rusty Pierce
1	GK	USA	Matt Reis
6	GK	USA	Kyle Singer
19	DF	USA	Nick Downing
23	MF	USA	Tony Frias

== Transfers ==
Adapted from New England Revolution ClubHistory_Stats _Records.pdf

=== Transfers In ===
New England Revolution – 2003 Transfers In
Date	Name	Fee	Position	Previous club
January 3, 2003	Piotr Nowak	Trade	MF	(United States) Chicago Fire
January 17, 2003	Matt Reis	Trade	GK	(United States) LA Galaxy
January 17, 2003	Pat Noonan	2003 MLS SuperDraft	FW	(United States) Mid-Michigan Bucks
January 17, 2003	Dimelon Westfield	2003 MLS SuperDraft	FW	(United States) Young Harris Mountain Lions
January 17, 2003	Kyle Singer	2003 MLS SuperDraft	GK	(United States) Boston College Eagles men's soccer
January 28, 2003	Joe-Max Moore	???	FW	(England) Everton F.C.
April 11, 2003	Jason Moore	Trade	MF	(United States) Chicago Fire FC
May 21, 2003	Ibrahim Kante	Signed to "Developmental Contract"	FW	???
June 9, 2003	Jorge Vázquez	Undisclosed	MF	(Argentina) Club Atlético Atlanta
July 23, 2003	José Cancela	Signed as a "Discovery Player"	MF	(Costa Rica) Deportivo Saprissa
August 21, 2003	Darío Fabbro	Trade	FW	(United States) Kansas City Wizards
August 21, 2003	Chris Brown	Trade	FW	(United States) Kansas City Wizards
October 10, 2003	Chris Bagley	Signed as a "Developmental Player"	FW	(United States) Charleston Battery

=== Transfers Out ===
New England Revolution – 2003 Transfers Out
Date	Name	Fee	Position	Destination Club
January 17, 2003	Álex Pineda Chacón	Traded	MF	(United States) LA Galaxy
January 22, 2003	Braeden Cloutier	Waived	MF	(United States) Cleveland Force
February 10, 2003	Peter Nowak	Retired	MF	N/A
April 16, 2003	Nick Downing	Loan	DF	(United States) Portland Timbers
April 16, 2003	Winston Griffiths	Waived	MF	(Jamaica) Portmore United F.C.
July 7, 2003	Daniel Hernandez	Transfer (Undisclosed)	MF	(Mexico) Club Necaxa
August 8, 2003	Diego Serna	Trade	FW	(United States) LA Galaxy
August 21, 2003	Wolde Harris	Trade	FW	(United States) Kansas City Wizards
August 21, 2003	Jorge Vazquez	Trade	MF	(United States) Kansas City Wizards
November 25, 2003	Nick Downing	Waived	DF	(United States) Charleston Battery
November 25, 2003	Tony Frias	Waived	MF	???
November 25, 2003	Ibrahim Kante	Waived	FW	(United States) Baltimore Blast

1. On January 17, 2003, the Revolution acquired Matt Reis from the LA Galaxy in exchange for the rights to Alex Pineda Chacon and a second-round pick in the 2003 MLS SuperDraft. Additionally, the Revolution traded a fifth-round pick in the 2003 MLS SuperDraft to the MetroStars in exchange for a sixth-round pick in the 2004 MLS SuperDraft.
2. On January 17, 2003, the Revolution acquired Matt Reis from the LA Galaxy in exchange for the rights to Alex Pineda Chacon and a second-round pick in the 2003 MLS SuperDraft.
3. On April 11, 2003, the Revolution acquired Jason Moore's rights from the Chicago Fire in exchange for a fourth-round pick in the 2004 MLS SuperDraft.
4. On August 21, 2003, The Revolution acquired Dario Fabbro and Chris Brown from the Kansas city Wizards in exchange for Wolde Harris, Jorge Vazquez, and a conditional SuperDraft pick.
5. The Revolution received an "undisclosed" 2004 MLS SuperDraft pick as compensation for Nowak's retirement.
6 On August 8, 2003, the Revolution traded Diego Serna to the LA Galaxy for two conditional MLS SuperDraft picks.

== Honors ==
Adapted from 2024 New England Revolution Media Guide (pg. 326-328)

New England Revolution – 2003 League Awards and Honors
Award	Recipient(s)	Winner / FInalist
MLS Rookie of the Year	Pat Noonan	Finalist
MLS Fair Play Award	New England Revolution (Team)	Winner
MLS Player of the Month	Pat Noonan (October)	Winner
MLS Player of the Week	Taylor Twellman (Week 7); Brian Kamler (Week 8); Chris Brown (Week 22); Pat Noonan (Week 24, Week 30)	Winners
MLS All-Stars	Taylor Twellman	Winner
MLS Play of the Year	Adin Brown	Finalist
MLS Goal of the Year	Joe Franchino	Finalist

New England Revolution – 2003 Team Awards and Honors
Award	Recipient(s)	Winner / FInalist
Revolution Most Valuable Player	Taylor Twellman	Winner
Revolution Defender of the Year	Adin Brown	Winner
Revolution Scoring Champion	Taylor Twellman (34 pts.; 15G, 4A)	Winner
Revolution Humanitarian of the Year	Brian Kamler	Winner

== Statistical leaders ==
Adapted from 2024 New England Revolution Media Guide (pg. 329)

New England Revolution – 2003 Statistical Leaders
Category	Recipient(s)	Figure
Games played	(4-way tie - Kamler, Heaps, Joseph, Noonan)	28
Games Started	Jay Heaps, Brian Kamler	28
Minutes played	Jay Heaps	2,579
Goals	Taylor Twellman	15
Assists	(4-way tie - Noonan, Max-Moore, Cancela, Ralston)	7
Shots	Taylor Twellman	90
Shots on Goal	Taylor Twellman	47
Fouls Committed	Shalrie Joseph	62

== Competitions ==
=== Major League Soccer ===
==== Standings ====
Eastern Conference

Pos	Team	Pld	W	L	T	GF	GA	GD	Pts	Qualification
1	Chicago Fire	30	15	7	8	53	43	+10	53	MLS Cup Playoffs
2	New England Revolution	30	12	9	9	55	47	+8	45	MLS Cup Playoffs
3	MetroStars	30	11	10	9	40	40	0	42	MLS Cup Playoffs
4	D.C. United	30	10	11	9	38	36	+2	39	MLS Cup Playoffs
5	Columbus Crew	30	10	12	8	44	44	0	38	

Source: MLS

Overall table

Pos	Team	Pld	W	L	T	GF	GA	GD	Pts	Qualification
1	Chicago Fire (S)	30	15	7	8	53	43	+10	53	CONCACAF Champions' Cup
2	San Jose Earthquakes (C)	30	14	7	9	45	35	+10	51	CONCACAF Champions' Cup
3	New England Revolution	30	12	9	9	55	47	+8	45	
4	Kansas City Wizards	30	11	10	9	48	44	+4	42	
5	MetroStars	30	11	10	9	40	40	0	42	
6	Colorado Rapids	30	11	12	7	40	45	−5	40	
7	D.C. United	30	10	11	9	38	36	+2	39	
8	Columbus Crew	30	10	12	8	44	44	0	38	
9	Los Angeles Galaxy	30	9	12	9	35	35	0	36	
10	Dallas Burn	30	6	19	5	35	64	−29	23	

Source: MLS
Rules for classification: 1) points; 2) head-to-head record; 3) goal difference; 4) number of goals scored
(C) Champions; (S) Supporters' Shield

== Matches ==
=== 2003 CONCACAF Champions' Cup ===
March 23, 2003 Round of 16 - Leg 1	New England Revolution	0–4	Liga Deportiva Alajuelense	Alajuela, Costa Rica
		Match Report	Erick Scott; Alejandro Alpízar; Rolando Fonseca	Stadium: Estadio Alejandro Morera Soto
Note: The Revolution were the "home" team in this match; despite clearly not being at home.

March 26, 2003 Round of 16 - Leg 2	Liga Deportiva Alajuelense	1–3 (3–5 agg.)	New England Revolution	Alajuela, Costa Rica
	Rolando Fonseca 65' (pen.)	Match Report	Taylor Twellman 18' (pen.); Wolde Harris 53'; Steve Ralston 55'; Shalrie Joseph (red card) 63'; Daniel Hernández (red card) 63'	Stadium: Estadio Alejandro Morera Soto; Referee: Rodolfo Sibrian

=== Regular season ===
April 13, 2003 1	Chicago Fire FC	1–1 (a.e.t.)	New England Revolution	Naperville, Illinois
	Jim Curtin (yellow card) 16'; DaMarcus Beasley 35' (yellow card) 83'; Carlos Bocanegra (yellow card) 55'}	Report	Taylor Twellman 41'; Joe-Max Moore (red card) 74'; Leo Cullen (yellow card) 89'	Stadium: Cardinal Stadium; Attendance: 7,143; Referee: Terry Vaughn

April 19, 2003 2	New England Revolution	1–2	Columbus Crew	Foxborough, Massachusetts
	Daouda Kanté (yellow card) 64'; Joe Franchino (yellow card) 81'; Steve Ralston 86'	Report	Eric Denton 12'; Brian McBride 53'	Stadium: Gillette Stadium; Attendance: 15,827; Referee: Brian Hall

April 26, 2003 3	Dallas Burn	2–1	New England Revolution	Southlake, Texas
	Ryan Suarez (yellow card) 65'; Jason Kreis 72'	Report	Joe-Max Moore 12'; Daouda Kanté (yellow card) 67' (yellow card) 70' (red card); Taylor Twellman 84'	Stadium: Dragon Stadium; Attendance: 8,543; Referee: Kevin Terry

May 3, 2003 4	New England Revolution	0–2	San Jose Earthquakes	Foxborough, Massachusetts
	Joe Franchino (yellow card) 57'	Report	Craig Waibel (yellow card) 21'; Carlos Llamosa 42' (o.g.); Brian Ching 56'	Stadium: Gillette Stadium; Attendance: 13,722; Referee: Noel Kenny

May 10, 2003 5	New England Revolution	2–0	LA Galaxy	Foxborough, Massachusetts
	Carlos Llamosa (yellow card) 37'; Brian Kamler 59'; Taylor Twellman 66'	Report	Tyrone Marshall (yellow card) 71'	Stadium: Gillette Stadium; Attendance: 11,278; Referee: Terry Vaughn

May 14, 2003 6	Kansas City Wizards	1–1 (a.e.t.)	New England Revolution	Kansas City, Missouri
	Igor Simutenkov 69'; Alex Zotincă (yellow card) 90+2'	Report	Taylor Twellman 90+1'	Stadium: Arrowhead Stadium; Attendance: 9,096; Referee: Jair Marrufo

May 17, 2003 7	New England Revolution	3–0	Chicago Fire	Foxborough, Massachusetts
	Taylor Twellman 18'; Jay Heaps (yellow card) 44' (goal) 49'; Steve Ralston 56'	Report	C.J. Brown (yellow card) 40' (yellow card) 62' (red card); Carlos Bocanegra (yellow card) 43'; Andy Williams (yellow card) 51'	Stadium: Gillette Stadium; Attendance: 10,086; Referee: Alex Prus

May 24, 2003 8	Columbus Crew	3–2	New England Revolution	Columbus, Ohio
	Ross Paule 40'; Brian Dunseth 76'	Report	Brian Kamler 36' 70'; Taylor Twellman 89'	Stadium: Columbus Crew Stadium; Attendance: 13,186; Referee: Kevin Stott

May 31, 2003 9	New England Revolution	2–2 (a.e.t.)	Kansas City Wizards	Foxborough, Massachusetts
	Jimmy Conrad 44' (o.g.); Brian Kamler 63'	Report	Preki 72' 83'	Stadium: Gillette Stadium; Attendance: 10,312; Referee: Brian Hall

June 14, 2003 10	Colorado Rapids	4–1	New England Revolution	Denver, Colorado
	Seth Trembly 9'; John Spencer 21'; Mark Chung 39'; Chris Carrieri 69'	Report	Wolde Harris 81'	Stadium: Invesco Field at Mile High; Attendance: 15,967; Referee: Alex Prus

June 21, 2003 11	D.C. United	1–1 (a.e.t.)	New England Revolution	Washington, D.C.
	Jose Alegria (yellow card) 24'; Hristo Stoichkov 31' (yellow card) 32'	Report	Brian Kamler 24'; Rusty Pierce (yellow card) 35'; Shalrie Joseph (yellow card) 37'; Carlos Llamosa (yellow card) 56'	Stadium: Robert F. Kennedy Memorial Stadium; Attendance: 11,022; Referee: Brian Hall

June 28, 2003 12	New England Revolution	3–2	Colorado Rapids	Foxborough, Massachusetts
	Wolde Harris 7'; Rusty Pierce (yellow card) 30'; Steve Ralston (yellow card) 78'; Taylor Twellman 80'; Wes Hart 94' (o.g.)	Report	Mark Chung 34'; John Spencer 66'	Stadium: Gillette Stadium; Attendance: 15,839; Referee: Noel Kenny

July 4, 2003 13	LA Galaxy	2–2 (a.e.t.)	New England Revolution	Carson, California
	Tyrone Marshall (yellow card) 17'; Carlos Ruiz 28' (pen.); Sasha Victorine (yellow card) 46'; Alejandro Moreno 60'; Mauricio Cienfuegos (yellow card) 63'; Simon Elliott (yellow card) 90+3'	Report	Rusty Pierce (yellow card) 12'; Shalrie Joseph (yellow card) 23'; Jay Heaps (yellow card) 31' (goal) 54'; Carlos Llamosa (yellow card) 45+2'; Taylor Twellman 52'; Joe Franchino (yellow card) 83'	Stadium: The Home Depot Center; Attendance: 27,000; Referee: Michael Kennedy

July 12, 2003 14	MetroStars	3–3 (a.e.t.)	New England Revolution	East Rutherford, New Jersey
	John Wolyniec 66'; Daouda Kanté 73' (o.g.); Ricardo Clark 76'	Report	Taylor Twellman 7'; Daouda Kanté (yellow card) 27'; Carlos Llamosa (yellow card) 35'; Joe-Max Moore 36'; Pat Noonan 50'; Marshall Leonard (yellow card) 81'; Joe Franchino (yellow card) 90'	Stadium: Giants Stadium; Attendance: 33,652; Referee: Terry Vaughn

July 16, 2003 15	New England Revolution	1–2	Dallas Burn	Foxborough, Massachusetts
	Joe Franchino (yellow card) 10'; Daouda Kanté (yellow card) 38'; Joe-Max Moore 44'; Carlos Llamosa (yellow card) 66'	Report	Ronald Cerritos 4'; Shavar Thomas 13'; Óscar Pareja (yellow card) 20'; Shavar Thomas (yellow card) 27' (yellow card) 67' (red card); Steve Morrow (yellow card) 57'; Ezra Hendrickson (yellow card) 82'; D. J. Countess (yellow card) 90'	Stadium: Gillette Stadium; Attendance: 10,361; Referee: Michael Kennedy

July 19, 2003 16	Chicago Fire	3–1	New England Revolution	Naperville, Illinois
	Kelly Gray 8'; Justin Mapp 34'; Damani Ralph 51' (pen.); Dipsy Selolwane (yellow card) 66'	Report	Taylor Twellman (yellow card) 58' (goal) 90+2'; Jason Moore (yellow card) 60'; Jay Heaps (yellow card) 62'; Shalrie Joseph (yellow card) 75'	Stadium: Cardinal Stadium; Attendance: 12,345; Referee: Kevin Terry

July 23, 2003 17	Columbus Crew	1–1 (a.e.t.)	New England Revolution	Columbus, Ohio
	Jeff Matteo 33'	Report	Shalrie Joseph (yellow card) 35'; Pat Noonan 55'; Carlos Llamosa (yellow card) 77'	Stadium: Columbus Crew Stadium; Attendance: 14,632; Referee: Brian Hall

July 27, 2003 18	New England Revolution	2–4	D.C. United	Foxborough, Massachusetts
	Taylor Twellman 26' 31'	Report	Brandon Prideaux (yellow card) 73'; Eliseo Quintanilla 83' 90+1' (pen.); Mike Petke (yellow card) 84'; Ali Curtis (yellow card) 87'; Dema Kovalenko 90+2'; Alecko Eskandarian 90+3'	Stadium: Gillette Stadium; Attendance: 30,912; Referee: Marcel Yonan
Note: This match was part of a double-header ChampionsWorld Series match featuring FC Barcelona and Juventus FC.

August 9, 2003 19	D.C. United	1–0	New England Revolution	Washington, D.C.
	Galin Ivanov (yellow card) 26'; Bobby Convey (red card) 52'; Dema Kovalenko (yellow card) 57' (goal) 90+2'	Report	Carlos Llamosa (yellow card) 44'; Jay Heaps (red card)	Stadium: Robert F. Kennedy Memorial Stadium; Attendance: 14,374; Referee: Kevin Stott

August 16, 2003 20	New England Revolution	1–1 (a.e.t.)	San Jose Earthquakes	Foxborough, Massachusetts
	Taylor Twellman 52'; Brian Kamler (yellow card) 58'; Joe Franchino (yellow card) 76'	Report	Ronnie Ekelund 23'; Brian Mullan (yellow card) 56'; Ramiro Corrales (yellow card) 87'; Ian Russell (yellow card) 90+2'	Stadium: Gillette Stadium; Attendance: 14,877; Referee: Abbey Okulaja

August 23, 2003 21	LA Galaxy	2–1 (a.e.t.)	New England Revolution	Carson, California
	Carlos Ruiz 22' (yellow card) 76' (goal) 98'; Chris Albright (yellow card) 38'; Cobi Jones (yellow card) 66'	Report	Carlos Llamosa (yellow card) 35'; Joe Franchino (yellow card) 58'; José Cancela 68' (pen.); Rusty Pierce (yellow card) 90+2'	Stadium: The Home Depot Center; Attendance: 20,377; Referee: Michael Kennedy

August 30, 2003 22	New England Revolution	5–1	Chicago Fire	Foxborough, Massachusetts
	Chris Brown 6' 63' 68'; Jay Heaps (yellow card) 38' (goal) 88'; Brian Kamler 44'	Report	Andy Williams 14' (yellow card) 71'; Evan Whitfield (yellow card) 36'; Orlando Perez (yellow card) 74'	Stadium: Gillette Stadium; Attendance: 10,846; Referee: Kevin Stott

September 7, 2003 23	San Jose Earthquakes	1–2	New England Revolution	San Jose, California
	Ramiro Corrales (yellow card) 30'; Dwayne De Rosario 42'; Landon Donovan 52'; Ronnie Ekelund (yellow card) 58'; Brian Mullan (yellow card) 83'	Report	Pat Noonan 41'; Rusty Pierce (yellow card) 63' (yellow card) 83' (red card)	Stadium: Spartan Stadium; Attendance: 13,510; Referee: Noel Kenny

September 13, 2003 24	MetroStars	1–2	New England Revolution	East Rutherford, New Jersey
	Steve Jolley 81'; Eddie Pope (yellow card) 90+3'	Report	Pat Noonan 11' 72'; Jay Heaps (yellow card) 18'; Daouda Kanté (yellow card) 74'	Stadium: Giants Stadium; Attendance: 14,742; Referee: Abbey Okulaja

September 18, 2003 25	New England Revolution	0–0 (a.e.t.)	Colorado Rapids	Foxborough, Massachusetts
	Rusty Pierce (yellow card) 45+1'; Taylor Twellman (yellow card) 53'; Brian Kamler (red card) 54'	Report	Kyle Beckerman (red card) 43'; Pablo Mastroeni (yellow card) 52' (yellow card) 94' (red card)	Stadium: Gillette Stadium; Attendance: 8,807; Referee: Alex Prus

September 28, 2003 26	New England Revolution	3–2 (a.e.t.)	Columbus Crew	Foxborough, Massachusetts
	Carlos Llamosa (yellow card) 50'; Shalrie Joseph (yellow card) 65' (goal) 81'; Joe-Max Moore 78'; Joe Franchino 97'	Report	Mark Williams (yellow card) 22'; Frankie Hejduk (yellow card) 27'; Brian McBride (yellow card) 30'; Kyle Martino 41' (yellow card) 67'; Eric Denton 72' (yellow card) 80'; Jeff Matteo (yellow card) 96'	Stadium: Gillette Stadium; Attendance: 8,594; Referee: Terry Vaughn

October 4, 2003 27	Dallas Burn	1–4	New England Revolution	Southlake, Texas
	Óscar Pareja 20'	Report	Taylor Twellman 44' 60'; Shalrie Joseph 53'; Pat Noonan 75'	Stadium: Dragon Stadium; Attendance: 8,917; Referee: Brian Hall

October 11, 2003 28	New England Revolution	1–0 (a.e.t.)	D.C. United	Foxborough, Massachusetts
	Steve Ralston 92' (pen.)	Report	Marco Etcheverry (yellow card) 91'	Stadium: Gillette Stadium; Attendance: 12,006; Referee: Ali Saheli

October 18, 2003 28	MetroStars	1–2	New England Revolution	East Rutherford, New Jersey
	Andrzej Juskowiak 75'; Mark Lisi (yellow card) 79'	Report	Darío Fabbro 15'; Pat Noonan 37'	Stadium: Giants Stadium; Attendance: 18,649; Referee: Alex Prus

October 25, 2003 30	New England Revolution	5–2	MetroStars	Foxborough, Massachusetts
	Pat Noonan 41' 51' 68'; Darío Fabbro 45'; Steve Ralston 65'; Rusty Pierce (yellow card) 83'	Report	Jacob LeBlanc (yellow card) 56' (goal) 69'; Mark Lisi 58' (pen.)	Stadium: Gillette Stadium; Attendance: 12,492; Referee: Brian Hall

=== MLS Cup playoffs ===
November 1, 2003 (Conference Semifinals), Leg 1 of 2	MetroStars	0–2	New England Revolution	East Rutherford, New Jersey
18:00 EST	Clint Mathis (yellow card) 7'; Amado Guevara (yellow card) 41'; Joey DiGiamarino (yellow card) 69'; Mark Lisi (yellow card) 90+4'	Report	Marshall Leonard (yellow card) 4'; Darío Fabbro 17'; Jay Heaps (yellow card) 38'; Pat Noonan 65'; Shalrie Joseph (yellow card) 75'	Stadium: Giants Stadium; Attendance: 10,211; Referee: Terry Vaughn

November 9, 2003 (Conference Semifinals), Leg 2 of 2	New England Revolution	1–1 (3–1 agg.)	MetroStars	Foxborough, Massachusetts
16:00 EST	Pat Noonan 21'; Carlos Llamosa (yellow card) 45+1'; Rusty Pierce (yellow card) 82'	Report	Amado Guevara 45+1' (pen.) (yellow card) 53'; Ricardo Clark (yellow card) 78'	Stadium: Gillette Stadium; Attendance: 14,823; Referee: Ali Saheli
Note: NE Revolution won on aggregate score over two legs

November 14, 2003 Eastern Conference Final	Chicago Fire	1–0	New England Revolution	Chicago, Illinois
	DaMarcus Beasley (yellow card) 65'; Chris Armas 101'	Report	Carlos Llamosa (yellow card) 37'; Jay Heaps (yellow card) 54'; Steve Ralston (yellow card) 87'; Jason Moore (yellow card) 95'	Stadium: Soldier Field; Attendance: 14,610; Referee: Terry Vaughn

=== U.S. Open Cup ===
August 6, 2003 Fourth Round	Rochester Raging Rhinos (A-League)	1–2	New England Revolution (MLS)	Ludlow, Massachusetts
	Stoian Mladenov 23'; Yuri Lavrinenko (yellow card) 52'; Cuauhtemoc Suarez (yellow card) 81'	(Report)	Steve Ralston 25'; Taylor Twellman 45'; Rusty Pierce (yellow card) 53' (yellow card) 79' (red card)	Stadium: Lusitano Stadium; Attendance: -- Referee: Gus St. Silva (USA)

August 27, 2003	New England Revolution (MLS)	1–2 (a.e.t.)	MetroStars (MLS)	Piscataway, New Jersey
	Jay Heaps 45'; Joe Franchino (red card)	(Report)	Clint Mathis 29' (yellow card) 61' (yellow card) 97' (red card); Mark Lisi (yellow card) 47'; Richie Williams (yellow card) 105'; Amado Guevara (yellow card) 106' 116'	Stadium: Yurcak Field; Attendance: 3,853; Referee: Roni Canales (USA)
