= 2006 New England Revolution season =

New England Revolution
2006 season
- Owner: Robert Kraft (The Kraft Group)
- Head coach: Steve Nicol
- Stadium: Gillette Stadium; Foxborough, Massachusetts
- MLS: Conference: 1st Overall: 2nd
- MLS Cup Playoffs: Runner-up
- U.S. Open Cup: Quarterfinals
- Champions Cup: Quarterfinals
- Top goalscorer: Taylor Twellman (11g)
- Average home league attendance: 11,786
- Biggest win: 4–0 (May 6 vs. LA Galaxy)
- Biggest defeat: 4–0 (May 20 vs. FC Dallas)
| Home colors | Away colors |

The 2006 New England Revolution season was the eleventh season for the New England Revolution both as a club and in Major League Soccer (MLS). The club reached the playoffs after finishing first in the Eastern Conference (MLS). The club also reached the MLS Cup final, where they lost to the Houston Dynamo. Additionally, they club participated in the U.S. Open Cup, and the CONCACAF Champions' Cup. They were eliminated in both competitions in the quarterfinals.

== Season overview ==
The Revolution made three selections in the 2006 MLS Superdraft. The team's preseason preparations, as well as their participation in the CONCACAF Champions Cup, saw them traveling to Bermuda and Costa Rica. As a result of this, the club announced "TNT Vacations" as its official vacation partner, and introduced a series of fan travel packages that allowed fans to take trips to see the team.

In the 2006 CONCACAF Champions' Cup the Revolution again faced Liga Deportiva Alajuelense, who they'd played in 2003. The Revolution qualified for the tournament by winning the Eastern Conference in 2005. Alajuelense won the series 1–0 on aggregate with a 90th minute free kick from Carlos Hernandez.

In the 2006 Major League Soccer season Twellman would again lead the team in goals, with 11. Clint Dempsey added 8 goals, and Steve Ralston and Andy Dorman contributed 6 a piece. Dorman additionally led the team in assists, with 7. Clint Dempsey and Shalrie Joseph were named to the roster of the 2006 MLS All-Star Game.

On-field results were not as strong as 2005, and the team went on a 7 match winless run throughout the month of June, and a six match winless streak in July and August. The June winless run kicked off in a May 20 matchup away at FC Dallas, which saw the Revolution concede the fastest four goals in MLS history (19 minutes), a record which would stand until 2020 when it was broken by Los Angeles FC.

Struggles were due in part to injury, but also to the 2006 FIFA World Cup. Avery John and Clint Dempsey would both miss seven weeks of MLS action away with the U.S. and Trinidad & Tobago national teams. The Revolution's July 22 match against Houston Dynamo FC marked Joseph's 100th appearance for the club. Ralston would make his 300th MLS appearance on August 6 at Chivas USA, and on August 9th vs. Kansas City, both Jay Heaps and Joe Franchino made their 150th career appearances as members of the Revolution. Additionally in July, the Revolution played an international friendly match against Celtic F.C. as part of Celtic's pre-season U.S. mini tour. 16,312 turned out to watch the match, which the Revolution salvaged in the 90th minute on a strike from Ryan Latham nullifying Rocco Quinn's 80th minute effort.

In August, Celtic would make a $1m bid for Shalrie Joseph, but the move would be blocked by MLS.

With Pat Noonan battling injuries for much of the season, the Revolution signed Mexican international striker José Manuel Abundis late in the season after Abundis was unable to come to a contractual agreement with Deportivo Toluca F.C.. He would soon become upset with lack of playing time. The same day, the team announced they'd additionally signed Arsène Oka to their developmental roster.

Despite the summer slump, the team's 12-12-8 record was good enough to see them to a second-place finish in the Eastern Conference, and a berth in the 2006 MLS Cup Playoffs.

In the Eastern Conference semifinals the Revolution once again squared off against rival Chicago Fire FC. Justin Mapp's 38th-minute goal was enough to give the Fire a 1–0 lead heading into the 2nd leg at Gillette Stadium.

In the return leg, Nate Jaqua gave Chicago an early lead, but goals from Twellman Noonan helped the Revolution complete a comeback and force penalties. In the shootout, Matt Reis not only converted a penalty, but saved shots by Thiago and Iván Guerrero to give the Revolution a 4–2 win and see them into the Eastern Conference Final for the fifth consecutive season.

The Eastern Conference Final was held at Robert F. Kennedy Memorial Stadium in front of 19,552 fans on November 5. Twellman's 4th-minute goal was enough to see the Revolution lift the trophy for the 3rd time in its history, and the Revolution were for the second season in a row off to Pizza Hut Park for the MLS Cup Final.

The sold-out MLS Cup 2006 saw the Revolution square off against Houston Dynamo, a club that was concluding its first season in the league. The match was scoreless until the 113th minute, when Twellman guided a shot past Pat Onstad after being played in behind Houston's line by Khano Smith. Unfortunately Houston would immediately level the scoring; with Brian Ching heading past Reis from the ensuing kickoff.

The match went to penalties, and despite more heroics from Reis (saving a shot by Brad Davis and converting his own kick) Onstad would save shots by Noonan and Heaps, giving the Dynamo a 4–3 edge, and the title.

In the 2006 U.S. Open Cup, the Revolution would win their first Open Cup match since 2003 on August 2 against the Rochester Raging Rhinos in the fourth round, but would fall in the quarter finals to eventual-champion Chicago Fire.

== Squad ==
=== First-team squad ===
As of October 13, 2006. Note: Flags indicate national team as defined under FIFA eligibility rules; some limited exceptions apply. Players may hold more than one non-FIFA nationality.

| No. | Pos. | Nation | Player |
|---|---|---|---|
| 1 | GK | USA | Matt Reis |
| 2 | MF | USA | Clint Dempsey |
| 3 | MD | USA | Daniel Hernandez |
| 4 | DF | TTO | Avery John |
| 5 | FW | GHA | Willie Sims |
| 6 | DF | USA | Jay Heaps |
| 7 | FW | URU | José Cancela |
| 8 | MF | USA | Joe Franchino |
| 11 | FW | USA | Pat Noonan |
| 12 | GK | USA | Doug Warren |
| 13 | MF | USA | Danny Wynn |
| 14 | MF | USA | Steve Ralston (Captain) |
| 15 | DF | USA | Michael Parkhurst |
| 16 | DF | USA | James Riley |
| 17 | FW | USA | Kyle Brown |

| No. | Pos. | Nation | Player |
|---|---|---|---|
| 18 | FW | BER | Khano Smith |
| 19 | DF | NZL | Tony Lochhead |
| 20 | FW | USA | Taylor Twellman |
| 21 | MF | GRN | Shalrie Joseph (Vice-Captain) |
| 22 | DF | USA | Marshall Leonard |
| 23 | MF | USA | Miguel Gonzalez |
| 24 | GK | USA | Brad Knighton |
| 25 | DF | WAL | Andy Dorman |
| 26 | MF | USA | Adam Williamson |
| 27 | MF | CZE | Jani Galik |
| 28 | DF | USA | Pat Haggerty |
| 30 | FW | MEX | José Manuel Abundis |
| 31 | DF | USA | Jeff Larentowicz |
| 32 | MF | CIV | Arsene Oka |
| 34 | GK | USA | T.J. Tomasso |

=== Transfers in ===
New England Revolution – 2006 Transfers In
| Name | Position | Date | Method | Fee | Prior Club | Reference |
|---|---|---|---|---|---|---|
| Leandro de Oliviera | MF | January 20, 2006 | Superdraft | N/A | UAB Blazers men's soccer | |
| Willie Simms | FW | January 20, 2006 | Superdraft | N/A | Cal State Northridge Matadors | |
| Kyle Brown | FW | January 20, 2006 | Superdraft | N/A | Tulsa Golden Hurricane | |
| Danny Wynn | MF | January 26, 2006 | Supplemental Draft | N/A | Saint Louis Billikens men's soccer | |
| John Queely | DF | January 26, 2006 | Supplemental Draft | N/A | NC State Wolfpack men's soccer | |
| Adam Williamson | MF | January 26, 2006 | Supplemental Draft | N/A | Ocean City Nor'easters | |
| Matt Wieland | DF | January 26, 2006 | Supplemental Draft | N/A | Creighton Bluejays men's soccer | |
| Jani Galik | MF | March 2, 2006 | Undisclosed | N/A | IMG Academy Bradenton | |
| Miguel Gonzalez | MF | July 20, 2006 | Undisclosed | N/A | IMG Academy Bradenton | |
| José Manuel Abundis | FW | September 15, 2006 | Undisclosed | N/A | Deportivo Toluca F.C. | |
| Arsène Oka | DF | September 15, 2006 | Undisclosed | N/A | Africa Sports d'Abidjan | |

=== Transfers Out ===
New England Revolution – 2006 Transfers Out
| Name | Position | Date | Method | Fee | Next Club | Reference |
|---|---|---|---|---|---|---|
| Jose Manuel Abundis | FW | November 27, 2006 | Option not picked up | N/A | Querétaro F.C. | |
| Leandro de Oliviera | MF | June 29, 2006 | Waived | N/A | N/A | |
| Ryan Latham | FW | August 7, 2006 | Waived | N/A | Legends FC | |
| Jani Galik | FW | November 16, 2006 | Waived | N/A | Harrisburg City Islanders | |
| Pat Haggerty | DF | November 16, 2006 | Waived | N/A | N/A | |
| Danny Wynn | DF | November 16, 2006 | Waived | N/A | St. Louis Illusion | |
| Adam Williamson | MF | November 16, 2006 | Waived | N/A | Wilmington Hammerheads FC | |
| Jose Cancela | MF | November 17, 2006 | 2007 MLS expansion draft | N/A | Toronto FC | |

=== Squad Statistics ===
Adapted from FBref on May 11, 2024.

| Player | Nationality | Position | Age | MP | Starts | Min | 90s | Gls | Ast | G+A | G-PK | PK | PKatt | CrdY | CrdR | Gls | Ast | G+A | G-PK | G+A-PK |
|---|---|---|---|---|---|---|---|---|---|---|---|---|---|---|---|---|---|---|---|---|
| Matt Reis | USA | GK | 30 | 32 | 32 | 2,880 | 32 | 0 | 0 | 0 | 0 | 0 | 0 | 0 | 0 | 0 | 0 | 0 | 0 | 0 |
| Taylor Twellman | USA | FW | 25 | 32 | 32 | 2,856 | 31.7 | 11 | 2 | 13 | 11 | 0 | 0 | 3 | 0 | 0.35 | 0.06 | 0.41 | 0.35 | 0.41 |
| Andy Dorman | WAL | MF | 23 | 32 | 32 | 2,834 | 31.5 | 6 | 7 | 13 | 6 | 0 | 0 | 5 | 0 | 0.19 | 0.22 | 0.41 | 0.19 | 0.41 |
| Jay Heaps | USA | DF,MF | 29 | 31 | 31 | 2,790 | 31 | 0 | 2 | 2 | 0 | 0 | 0 | 7 | 0 | 0 | 0.06 | 0.06 | 0 | 0.06 |
| Michael Parkhurst | USA | DF | 22 | 30 | 30 | 2,700 | 30 | 0 | 0 | 0 | 0 | 0 | 0 | 1 | 0 | 0 | 0 | 0 | 0 | 0 |
| Steve Ralston | USA | MF | 31 | 30 | 30 | 2,683 | 29.8 | 6 | 4 | 10 | 5 | 1 | 1 | 0 | 0 | 0.2 | 0.13 | 0.34 | 0.17 | 0.3 |
| Shalrie Joseph | GRN | DF,MF | 27 | 26 | 26 | 2,331 | 25.9 | 3 | 0 | 3 | 2 | 1 | 1 | 6 | 0 | 0.12 | 0 | 0.12 | 0.08 | 0.08 |
| Clint Dempsey | USA | FW,MF | 22 | 21 | 21 | 1,865 | 20.7 | 8 | 2 | 10 | 8 | 0 | 0 | 5 | 0 | 0.39 | 0.1 | 0.48 | 0.39 | 0.48 |
| James Riley | USA | DF | 23 | 20 | 20 | 1,706 | 19 | 0 | 0 | 0 | 0 | 0 | 0 | 5 | 0 | 0 | 0 | 0 | 0 | 0 |
| Jeff Larentowicz | USA | DF,MF | 22 | 26 | 19 | 1,974 | 21.9 | 1 | 1 | 2 | 1 | 0 | 0 | 4 | 0 | 0.05 | 0.05 | 0.09 | 0.05 | 0.09 |
| Joe Franchino | USA | DF,MF | 29 | 21 | 19 | 1,521 | 16.9 | 0 | 1 | 1 | 0 | 0 | 0 | 9 | 0 | 0 | 0.06 | 0.06 | 0 | 0.06 |
| José Cancela | URU | MF | 29 | 21 | 15 | 1,387 | 15.4 | 0 | 3 | 3 | 0 | 0 | 0 | 0 | 0 | 0 | 0.19 | 0.19 | 0 | 0.19 |
| Pat Noonan | USA | FW | 25 | 14 | 12 | 851 | 9.5 | 1 | 2 | 3 | 1 | 0 | 0 | 1 | 0 | 0.11 | 0.21 | 0.32 | 0.11 | 0.32 |
| Avery John | TRI | DF | 30 | 10 | 10 | 893 | 9.9 | 0 | 0 | 0 | 0 | 0 | 0 | 3 | 1 | 0 | 0 | 0 | 0 | 0 |
| Tony Lochhead | NZL | DF | 24 | 16 | 9 | 797 | 8.9 | 0 | 1 | 1 | 0 | 0 | 0 | 1 | 0 | 0 | 0.11 | 0.11 | 0 | 0.11 |
| Daniel Hernández | USA | DF,MF | 29 | 7 | 5 | 429 | 4.8 | 0 | 0 | 0 | 0 | 0 | 0 | 3 | 0 | 0 | 0 | 0 | 0 | 0 |
| Khano Smith | BER | FW,MF | 24 | 10 | 2 | 342 | 3.8 | 1 | 0 | 1 | 1 | 0 | 0 | 4 | 0 | 0.26 | 0 | 0.26 | 0.26 | 0.26 |
| Kyle Brown | USA | FW | 22 | 12 | 2 | 291 | 3.2 | 0 | 1 | 1 | 0 | 0 | 0 | 0 | 0 | 0 | 0.31 | 0.31 | 0 | 0.31 |
| Willie Sims | GUA | FW | 22 | 9 | 2 | 219 | 2.4 | 0 | 0 | 0 | 0 | 0 | 0 | 0 | 0 | 0 | 0 | 0 | 0 | 0 |
| José Manuel Abundis | CZE | FW | 32 | 2 | 2 | 140 | 1.6 | 1 | 0 | 1 | 1 | 0 | 0 | 0 | 0 | 0.64 | 0 | 0.64 | 0.64 | 0.64 |
| Jani Galik | CZE | MF | 21 | 2 | 1 | 46 | 0.5 | 0 | 0 | 0 | 0 | 0 | 0 | 0 | 0 | 0 | 0 | 0 | 0 | 0 |
| Marshall Leonard | USA | DF | 25 | 1 | 0 | 76 | 0.8 | 0 | 0 | 0 | 0 | 0 | 0 | 0 | 0 | 0 | 0 | 0 | 0 | 0 |
| Danny Wynn | USA | MF | 22 | 2 | 0 | 62 | 0.7 | 0 | 0 | 0 | 0 | 0 | 0 | 0 | 0 | 0 | 0 | 0 | 0 | 0 |

== Club ==
New England Revolution – 2006 Coaches and Staff
| Title | Name | Nationality | Reference |
|---|---|---|---|
| Investor / Operator | Robert Kraft | (United States) | |
| Director of Soccer | Mike Burns | (United States) | |
| General Manager | Craig Tornberg | (United States) | |
| Head Coach | Steve Nicol | (Scotland) | |
| Assistant Coach | Paul Mariner | (England) | |
| Assistant Coach | David Vanole | (United States) | |
| Head Athletic Trainer | Steven Glazier | (United States) | |
| Equipment Manager | Brian Banfill | (United States) | |
| Massage Therapist | Glenn O'Connor | (United States) | |

== Standings ==
=== Eastern Conference ===
| Pos | Team | Pld | W | L | T | GF | GA | GD | Pts | Qualification |
|---|---|---|---|---|---|---|---|---|---|---|
| 1 | D.C. United | 32 | 15 | 7 | 10 | 52 | 38 | +14 | 55 | MLS Cup Playoffs |
| 2 | New England Revolution | 32 | 12 | 8 | 12 | 39 | 35 | +4 | 48 | MLS Cup Playoffs |
| 3 | Chicago Fire | 32 | 13 | 11 | 8 | 43 | 41 | +2 | 47 | MLS Cup Playoffs |
| 4 | New York Red Bulls | 32 | 9 | 11 | 12 | 41 | 41 | 0 | 39 | MLS Cup Playoffs |
| 5 | Kansas City Wizards | 32 | 10 | 14 | 8 | 43 | 45 | −2 | 38 | |
| 6 | Columbus Crew | 32 | 8 | 15 | 9 | 30 | 42 | −12 | 33 | |

Source: MLS

=== Overall standings ===
| Pos | Team | Pld | W | L | T | GF | GA | GD | Pts | Qualification |
|---|---|---|---|---|---|---|---|---|---|---|
| 1 | D.C. United (S) | 32 | 15 | 7 | 10 | 52 | 38 | +14 | 55 | CONCACAF Champions' Cup |
| 2 | FC Dallas | 32 | 16 | 12 | 4 | 48 | 44 | +4 | 52 | North American SuperLiga |
| 3 | New England Revolution | 32 | 12 | 8 | 12 | 39 | 35 | +4 | 48 | |
| 4 | Chicago Fire | 32 | 13 | 11 | 8 | 43 | 41 | +2 | 47 | |
| 5 | Houston Dynamo (C) | 32 | 11 | 8 | 13 | 44 | 40 | +4 | 46 | CONCACAF Champions' Cup |
| 6 | Chivas USA | 32 | 10 | 9 | 13 | 45 | 42 | +3 | 43 | |
| 7 | Colorado Rapids | 32 | 11 | 13 | 8 | 36 | 49 | −13 | 41 | |
| 8 | New York Red Bulls | 32 | 9 | 11 | 12 | 41 | 41 | 0 | 39 | |
| 9 | Los Angeles Galaxy | 32 | 11 | 15 | 6 | 37 | 37 | 0 | 39 | North American SuperLiga |
| 10 | Real Salt Lake | 32 | 10 | 13 | 9 | 45 | 49 | −4 | 39 | |
| 11 | Kansas City Wizards | 32 | 10 | 14 | 8 | 43 | 45 | −2 | 38 | |
| 12 | Columbus Crew | 32 | 8 | 15 | 9 | 30 | 42 | −12 | 33 | |

Source: MLS
Rules for classification: 1) points; 2) head-to-head record; 3) goal difference; 4) number of goals scored
(C) Champions; (S) Supporters' Shield

== Results ==
=== Home and Away ===
| Overall | | | | | | | | Home | | | | | | Away | | | | | |
| Pld | Pts | W | L | T | GF | GA | GD | W | L | T | GF | GA | GD | W | L | T | GF | GA | GD |
|---|---|---|---|---|---|---|---|---|---|---|---|---|---|---|---|---|---|---|---|
| 32 | 48 | 12 | 8 | 12 | 39 | 35 | +4 | 8 | 3 | 5 | 23 | 14 | +9 | 4 | 5 | 7 | 16 | 21 | −5 |

Last updated: May 10, 2024
Pld = Matches played; Pts = Points; W = Matches won; T = Matches tied; L = Matches lost; GF = Goals for; GA = Goals against; GD = Goal difference

| Round | 1 | 2 | 3 | 4 | 5 | 6 | 7 | 8 | 9 | 10 | 11 | 12 | 13 | 14 | 15 | 16 | 17 | 18 | 19 | 20 | 21 | 22 | 23 | 24 | 25 | 26 | 27 | 28 | 29 | 30 | 31 | 32 |
|---|---|---|---|---|---|---|---|---|---|---|---|---|---|---|---|---|---|---|---|---|---|---|---|---|---|---|---|---|---|---|---|---|
| Stadium | A | A | A | H | H | H | A | H | A | A | H | A | A | H | H | A | A | H | A | A | A | H | H | H | A | H | H | A | H | H | A | H |
| Result | W | D | L | L | W | W | L | D | L | D | D | D | D | W | W | L | W | L | D | D | D | D | L | W | L | W | D | W | D | W | W | W |

Source: New England Revolution
A = Away; H = Home; W = Win; D = Draw; L = Loss

=== Regular season ===
Attendance figures adapted from 2024 Media Guide (pg. 252)

| 1 April 2006 1 | LA Galaxy | 0–1 | New England Revolution | Carson, California |
| 20:00 EDT | Ugo Ihemelu (yellow card) 51' | Report | Clint Dempsey 33' (yellow card) 89'; Daniel Hernández (yellow card) 54'; James Riley (yellow card) 79' | Stadium: Home Depot Center; Attendance: 27,000; Referee: Abbey Okulaja |

| 8 April 2006 2 | New York Red Bulls | 0–0 | New England Revolution | Harrison, New Jersey |
| 19:30 EDT | | Report | Daniel Hernández (yellow card) 59'; James Riley (yellow card) 61'; Andy Dorman (yellow card) 69'; Jay Heaps (yellow card) 80' | Stadium: Red Bull Arena; Attendance: 35,793; Referee: Baldomero Toledo |

| 15 April 2006 3 | Kansas City Wizards | 1–0 | New England Revolution | Kansas City, Missouri |
| 19:30 | Jimmy Conrad 3'; Nick Garcia (yellow card) 49' | Report | Pat Noonan (yellow card) 8'; Shalrie Joseph (yellow card) 71' | Stadium: Arrowhead Stadium; Attendance: 8,436; Referee: Marcel Yonan |

| 30 April 2006 4 | New England Revolution | 1–2 | Chicago Fire FC | Foxborough, Massachusetts |
| 19:30 | Daniel Hernández (yellow card) 34'; Taylor Twellman 54' | Report | Diego Gutiérrez (yellow card) 43'; Thiago 64'; Chris Rolfe 68'; Chad Barrett (yellow card) 81' | Stadium: Gillette Stadium; Attendance: 11,762; Referee: Alex Prus |

| 6 May 2006 5 | New England Revolution | 4–0 | LA Galaxy | Foxborough, Massachusetts |
| 16:00 | Andy Dorman (yellow card) 5'; Taylor Twellman 5'; Steve Ralston 39'; Shalrie Joseph 43' (yellow card) 60' (goal) 69' (pen.); James Riley (yellow card) 70' | Report | Marcelo Saragosa (yellow card) 26' | Stadium: Gillette Stadium; Attendance: 11,419; Referee: Ricardo Salazar |

| 13 May 2006 6 | New England Revolution | 3–1 | Chivas USA | Foxborough, Massachusetts |
| 19:00 | Tony Lochhead (yellow card) 22'; Andy Dorman 23'; Shalrie Joseph (yellow card) 43' (goal) 53'; Taylor Twellman (yellow card) 59' (goal) 86' | Report | Francisco Mendoza 19' (yellow card) 76'; Carlos Llamosa (yellow card) 39'; Ante Razov (yellow card) 82'; Juan Pablo García (yellow card) 90+3' | Stadium: Gillette Stadium; Attendance: 6,882; Referee: Mark Geiger |

| 20 May 2006 7 | FC Dallas | 4–0 | New England Revolution | Frisco, Texas |
| | Kenny Cooper 4'; Carlos Ruiz 7' 16'; Ramón Núñez 19'; Simo Valakari (yellow card) 43'; Richard Mulrooney (yellow card) 76' | Report | Joe Franchino (yellow card) 45'; James Riley (yellow card) 75' | Stadium: Pizza Hut Park; Attendance: 18,090; Referee: Mauricio Navarro |

| 27 May 2006 8 | New England Revolution | 1–1 | Houston Dynamo | Foxborough, Massachusetts |
| 19:30 | Jay Heaps (yellow card) 34'; Ricardo Clark (yellow card) 45+2'; Steve Ralston 55' | Report | Eddie Robinson (yellow card) 58'; Ryan Cochrane 85' | Stadium: Gillette Stadium; Attendance: 10,882; Referee: Shane Moody |

| 3 June 2006 9 | DC United | 1–0 | New England Revolution | Washington, D.C. |
| | Jaime Moreno 14'; Josh Gros (yellow card) 52'; Facundo Erpen (yellow card) 53' | Report | Joe Franchino (yellow card) 37'; Jay Heaps (yellow card) 41' | Stadium: RFK Stadium; Attendance: 22,686; Referee: Abbey Okulaja |

| 11 June 2006 10 | Chicago Fire FC | 3–3 | New England Revolution | Bridgeview, Illinois |
| 18:00 | Brian Plotkin (yellow card) 27'; Nate Jaqua 39' 79'; Gonzalo Segares (yellow card) 50'; Calen Carr (yellow card) 90' (goal) 91' | Report | Joe Franchino (yellow card) 9'; Jeff Larentowicz (yellow card) 60'; Taylor Twellman 87'; Steve Ralston 93'; Andy Dorman 94' | Stadium: Toyota Park; Attendance: 12,941; Referee: Hilario Grajeda |

| 17 June 2006 11 | New England Revolution | 1–1 | DC United | Foxborough, Massachusetts |
| | Shalrie Joseph (yellow card) 64'; Andy Dorman 86' | Report | Jaime Moreno 44' (yellow card) 88'; Christian Gómez (yellow card) 83' | Stadium: Gillette Stadium; Attendance: 16,209; Referee: Brian Hall |

| 21 June 2006 12 | Columbus Crew | 1–1 | New England Revolution | Columbus, Ohio |
| 19:30 | Kei Kamara 86'; Marcos González (yellow card) 90+3' | Report | Andy Dorman 66'; Taylor Twellman (yellow card) 70' | Stadium: Columbus Crew Stadium; Attendance: 9,491; Referee: Jair Marrufo |

| 24 June 2006 13 | Real Salt Lake | 0–0 | New England Revolution | Salt Lake City, Utah |
| 19:00 | | Report | Jeff Larentowicz (yellow card) 59' | Stadium: Rice–Eccles Stadium; Attendance: 12,587; Referee: Terry Vaughn |

| 28 June 2006 14 | New England Revolution | 1–0 | FC Dallas | Foxborough, Massachusetts |
| | Avery John (yellow card) 22'; Taylor Twellman 23' | Report | Bobby Rhine (yellow card) 18'; Drew Moor (yellow card) 90+5' | Stadium: Gillette Stadium; Attendance: 7,247; Referee: Abbey Okulaja |

| 1 July 2006 15 | New England Revolution | 3–2 | New York Red Bulls | Foxborough, Massachusetts |
| 18:00 | Clint Dempsey 6'; Taylor Twellman 45+1'; Clint Dempsey 72'; Avery John (red card) 83' | Report | Edson Buddle 24'; Mike Magee 66' | Stadium: Gillette Stadium; Attendance: 9,424; Referee: Alex Prus |

| 4 July 2006 16 | Colorado Rapids | 3–2 | New England Revolution | Denver, Colorado |
| 19:30 | Nicolás Hernández 13' 69'; Kyle Beckerman 45+2' | Report | Clint Dempsey 26'; Taylor Twellman 91' | Stadium: INVESCO Field at Mile High; Attendance: 39,205; Referee: Ramon Hernandez |

| 8 July 2006 17 | Chicago Fire | 1–2 | New England Revolution | Bridgeview, Illinois |
| 19:30 | Nate Jaqua (yellow card) 27' (goal) 51' | Report | Steve Ralston 23'; Andy Dorman 37' (yellow card) 56'; Avery John (yellow card) 64' | Stadium: Toyota Park; Attendance: 11,374; Referee: Tim Weyland |

| 14 July 2006 18 | New England Revolution | 1–3 | Real Salt Lake | Foxborough, Massachusetts |
| 19:30 | James Riley (yellow card) 35'; Taylor Twellman 57' | Report | Chris Klein 16'; Eddie Pope (yellow card) 18'; Jeff Cunningham 52'; Jason Kreis (yellow card) 21' (goal) 55'; Willis Forko (yellow card) 88' | Stadium: Gillette Stadium; Attendance: 11,089; Referee: Hilario Grajeda |

| 22 July 2006 19 | Houston Dynamo | 1–1 | New England Revolution | Houston, Texas |
| 19:30 | Wade Barrett (yellow card) 33' (red card) 72'; Brad Davis (yellow card) 35'; Stuart Holden 63'; Ricardo Clark (yellow card) 66'; Brian Ching (yellow card) 84' | Report | Andy Dorman (yellow card) 18'; Michael Parkhurst (yellow card) 30'; Jay Heaps (yellow card) 52'; Craig Waibel 60' (OG)) | Stadium: Reliant Stadium; Attendance: 10,210; Referee: Michael Kennedy |

| 29 July 2006 20 | Kansas City Wizards | 1–1 | New England Revolution | Kansas City, Missouri |
| 19:30 | Davy Arnaud (yellow card) 30'; Nick Garcia (yellow card) 37'; Josh Wolff 12'; Jimmy Conrad (yellow card) 88' | Report | Matt Reis (yellow card) 13'; Steve Ralston 90+5' | Stadium: Arrowhead Stadium; Attendance: 7,710 |

| 6 August 2006 21 | Chivas USA | 1–1 | New England Revolution | Los Angeles, California |
| 18:30 | Jesse Marsch 22' | Report | Taylor Twellman 16' | Stadium: Los Angeles Coliseum; Attendance: 92,650; Referee: Kevin Stott |
Note: This match was part of a double-header featuring FC Barcelona and C.D. Guadalajara.

| 9 August 2006 22 | New England Revolution | 0–0 | Kansas City Wizards | Foxborough, Massachusetts |
| | Joe Franchino (yellow card) 20' | Report | Alex Zotincă (yellow card) 15'; Bo Oshoniyi (yellow card) 41'; Eddie Johnson (yellow card) 54' | Stadium: Gillette Stadium; Attendance: 9,798; Referee: Mauricio Navarro |

| 20 August 2006 23 | New England Revolution | 0–1 | Chicago Fire FC | Foxborough, Massachusetts |
| 15:00 | Jeff Larentowicz (yellow card) 3'; Jay Heaps (yellow card) 32'; Joe Franchino (yellow card) 39' | Report | Andy Herron 24' (yellow card) 54'; Chad Barrett (yellow card) 31'; Chris Armas (yellow card) 41'; Gonzalo Segares (yellow card) 64'; Nate Jaqua (yellow card) 81'; Calen Carr (yellow card) 90+2' | Stadium: Gillette Stadium; Attendance: 10,263; Referee: Andrew Chapin |

| 27 August 2006 24 | New England Revolution | 1–0 | Columbus Crew | Foxborough, Massachusetts |
| 19:00 | Shalrie Joseph (yellow card) 12'; Jeff Larentowicz 34'; James Riley (yellow card) 87' | Report | Eddie Gaven (yellow card) 25'; Jason Garey (yellow card) 39'; Ezra Hendrickson (yellow card) 53'; Bill Gaudette (yellow card) 64'; Joseph Ngwenya (red card) 63' | Stadium: Gillette Stadium; Attendance: 12,112; Referee: Shane Moody |

| 2 September 2006 25 | Columbus Crew | 3–0 | New England Revolution | Columbus, Ohio |
| 19:30 | Jason Garey 3'; Duncan Oughton (yellow card) 21'; Eddie Gaven 39'; Eddie Gaven (yellow card) 58'; Rusty Pierce (yellow card) 59'; Ezra Hendrickson 82' | Report | Joe Franchino (yellow card) 21' | Stadium: Columbus Crew Stadium; Attendance: 11,341; Referee: Jair Marrufo |

| 9 September 2006 26 | New England Revolution | 1–0 | New York Red Bulls | Foxborough, Massachusetts |
| 19:30 | Pat Noonan 8' | Report | Amado Guevara (yellow card) 81' (red card) 81' | Stadium: Gillette Stadium; Attendance: 12,617 |

| 13 September 2006 27 | New England Revolution | 1–1 | DC United | Foxborough, Massachusetts |
| 19:30 | Joe Franchino (yellow card) 11'; Clint Dempsey 56' (yellow card) 67'; Khano Smith (yellow card) 74' | Report | Josh Gross 25'; Bobby Boswell (yellow card) 36'; Ben Olsen (yellow card) 62'; Christian Gómez (yellow card) 63' | Stadium: Gillette Stadium; Attendance: 6,285; Referee: Jorge Gonzalez |

| 20 September 2006 28 | New York Red Bulls | 0–2 | New England Revolution | Harrison, New Jersey |
| 19:30 | | Report | Taylor Twellman 16'; Andy Dorman 48' | Stadium: Red Bull Arena; Attendance: 6,670; Referee: Ricardo Salazar |

| 23 September 2006 29 | New England Revolution | 1–1 | Kansas City Wizards | Foxborough, Massachusetts |
| 19:30 | Joe Franchino (yellow card) 3'; Clint Dempsey 17' | Report | Nick Garcia (yellow card) 12'; Scott Sealy 58' | Stadium: Gillette Stadium; Attendance: 16,321; Referee: Michael Kennedy |

| 30 September 2006 30 | New England Revolution | 3–1 | Colorado Rapids | Foxborough, Massachusetts |
| 19:30 | Steve Ralston 4' (pen.); Jay Heaps (yellow card) 55'; Jose Manuel Abundis 59'; Clint Dempsey 79' | Report | Aitor Karanka (yellow card) 3'; Kyle Beckerman (yellow card) 7'; Clint Mathis (red card) 65'; Mike Petke (yellow card) 66'; Nicolás Hernández (yellow card) 80'; Kyle Beckerman 91' (pen.) | Stadium: Gillette Stadium; Attendance: 17,093; Referee: Kevin Stott |

| 7 October 2006 31 | DC United | 1–2 | New England Revolution | Washington, D.C. |
| 19:30 | Matías Donnet (yellow card) 2'; Christian Gómez 26'; Alecko Eskandarian (yellow card) 79'; Stephen DeRoux (yellow card) 92' | Report | Clint Dempsey 34'; Taylor Twellman 47' | Stadium: RFK Stadium; Attendance: 21,022; Referee: Jair Maruffo |

| 14 October 2006 32 | New England Revolution | 1–0 | Columbus Crew | Foxborough, Massachusetts |
| 19:30 | Jeff Larentowicz (yellow card) 40'; Clint Dempsey (yellow card) 68'; Avery John (yellow card) 76'; Khano Smith 88' | Report | Joseph Ngwenya (yellow card) 50'; Rusty Pierce (yellow card) 82' | Stadium: Gillette Stadium; Attendance: 19,166; Referee: Michael Kennedy |

=== MLS Cup Playoffs ===
| 22 October 2006 Conf. Semifinals Leg 1 | Chicago Fire FC | 1–0 | New England Revolution | Bridgeview, Illinois |
| 12:00 | Andy Herron (yellow card) 16'; Justin Mapp 35'; Dasan Robinson (yellow card) 61' | Report | Jay Heaps (yellow card) 34'; Avery John (yellow card) 37'; Shalrie Joseph (yellow card) 57' | Stadium: Toyota Park; Attendance: 10,217; Referee: Tim Weyland |

| 28 October 2006 Conf. Semifinals Leg 2 | New England Revolution | 2–1 (a.e.t.) (4–2 p) | Chicago Fire FC | Foxboro, Massachusetts |
| 19:30 | Jeff Larentowicz (yellow card) 10'; Taylor Twellman 41'; Pat Noonan 58'; Daniel Hernandez (yellow card) 14' | Report | Gonzalo Segares (yellow card) 31'; Dasan Robinson (yellow card) 65'; Nate Jaqua 18' (yellow card) 116' | Stadium: Gillette Stadium; Attendance: 9,372; Referee: Jair Marrufo |
| | Penalties |
| | Jose Cancela (penalty scored); Matt Reis (penalty scored); Pat Noonan (penalty scored); Taylor Twellman (penalty scored) | | Thiago (penalty missed); Diego Gutiérrez (penalty scored); Andy Herron (penalty scored); Iván Guerrero (penalty missed) |

| 5 November 2006 Eastern Conference Final | DC United | 0–1 | New England Revolution | Washington D.C. |
| 16:00 | | Report | Andy Dorman (yellow card) 2'; Taylor Twellman 4' | Stadium: RFK Stadium; Attendance: 19,552; Referee: Kevin Slott |

| 28 October 2006 MLS Cup Final | Houston Dynamo | 1–1 (a.e.t.) (4–3 p) | New England Revolution | Frisco, Texas |
| 14:30 | Brad Davis (yellow card) 23'; Ryan Cochrane (yellow card) 99'; Craig Waibel (yellow card) 103'; Brian Ching 114' | Report | Joe Franchino (yellow card) 16'; Taylor Twellman 113' | Stadium: Pizza Hut Park; Attendance: 22,427; Referee: Jair Marrufo; MVP: Brian Ching |
| | Penalties |
| | Kelly Gray (penalty scored); Stuart Holden (penalty scored); Dwayne De Rosario (penalty scored); Brad Davis (penalty missed); Brian Ching (penalty scored) | | Shalrie Joseph (penalty scored); Matt Reis (penalty scored); Pat Noonan (penalty missed); Taylor Twellman (penalty scored); Jay Heaps (penalty missed) |

=== U.S. Open Cup ===
| 2 August 2006 4 | Rochester Raging Rhinos | 0–0 (a.e.t.) (4–5 p) | New England Revolution | Rochester, NY |
| | | Report | | Stadium: PAETEC Park; Attendance: 9,503; Referee: Michael Kennedy |
| | Penalties |
| | Mike Ambersley (penalty scored); John Ball (penalty scored); Matthew Delicate (penalty missed); Tenywa Bonseu (penalty missed); Aaran Lines (penalty scored); Kenney Bertz (penalty scored); Frankie Sanfilippo (penalty missed) | | Shalrie Joseph (penalty missed); Andy Dorman (penalty missed); José Cancela (penalty scored); Steve Ralston (penalty scored); James Riley (penalty scored); Matt Reis (penalty scored); Jeff Larentowicz (penalty scored) |

| 23 August 2006 Quarterfinals | Chicago Fire FC | 2–1 | New England Revolution | Bridgeview, Illinois |
| | Andy Herron 12'; Andy Herron 58' (pen.) | Report | Taylor Twellman 27' | Stadium: SeatGeek Stadium; Attendance: 5,214 |

=== CONCACAF Champion's Cup ===
| 22 February 2006 1 | New England Revolution | 0–0 | Liga Deportiva Alajuelense | Hamilton, Bermuda |
| | | Report | | Stadium: Bermuda National Stadium; Attendance: 1,500; Referee: Hu Liu |

| 8 March 2006 1 | Liga Deportiva Alajuelense | 1–0 | New England Revolution | Alajuela, Costa Rica |
| | Carlos Hernández 90' | Report | | Stadium: Estadio Alejandro Morera Soto; Attendance: 1,500; Referee: Peter Prendergast |

== Honors ==
=== League Awards and Honors ===
New England Revolution – 2006 League Awards
| Award | Name(s) |
|---|---|
| MLS Humanitarian of the Year | Michael Parkhurst (winner) |
| MLS Player of the Week | Clint Dempsey (Week 14) |
| MLS Best XI | Clint Dempsey (winner) |
| MLS Goal of the Week | Clint Dempsey (Week 28) |
| Panasonic Goalkeeper of the Year | Matt Reis (finalist) |
| Kraft Global Fair Play Finalists - Individual | Steve Ralston (finalist) |

=== Club Awards and Honors ===
New England Revolution – 2005 League Awards
| Award | Name(s) |
|---|---|
| Revolution Most Valuable Player | Matt Reis |
| Revolution Golden Boot | Taylor Twellman (11g, 5a) |
| Revolution Humanitarian of the Year | Michael Parkhurst |
| Revolution Defender of the Year | Shalrie Joseph |
