= New England Revolution in international competition =

Performance of American soccer club abroad

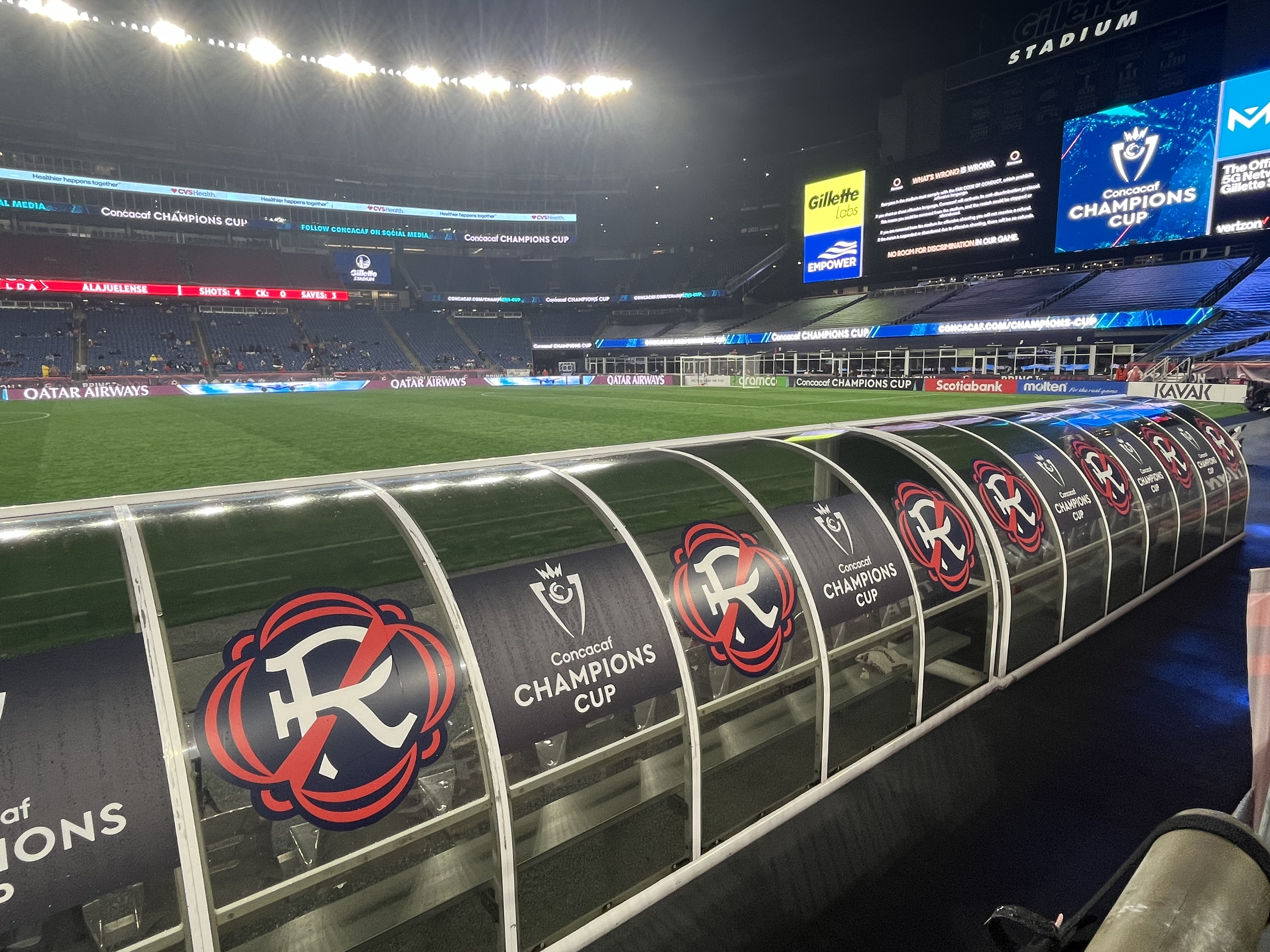
- The Revolution's bench before their match against Alajuelense in the 2024 CONCACAF Champions Cup
- Club: New England Revolution
- First entry: 2003 CONCACAF Champions' Cup
- Latest entry: 2024 CONCACAF Champions Cup

Titles
- SuperLiga: 1 (2008)

The New England Revolution are an American soccer club based in Foxborough, Massachusetts, that has competed in Major League Soccer (MLS) since the league's first season in 1996. The club has taken part five times in the CONCACAF Champions Cup, which was known as the CONCACAF Champions League between 2008 and 2023. Their best result (as of August 2025) is the quarterfinals, which they have reached on three occasions. In 2008, the team lost to Joe Public F.C., marking the first time an MLS side had lost to a Caribbean one. In 2022, they lost to Pumas UNAM in a penalty shootout after winning the first leg 3–0, which was only the second time in the tournament's history that a team failed to advance after securing that scoreline in the first match.

From 2008 to 2010, the Revolution participated in the SuperLiga, an annual competition between MLS and Liga MX (the first-division Mexican league). They won the 2008 edition of the tournament, winning the final in a penalty shootout against the Houston Dynamo. The club also reached the final of the 2010 SuperLiga, which they lost to Atlético Morelia. The tournament was discontinued after the 2010 edition. Since 2023, they have participated in the Leagues Cup, another annual tournament between the two leagues.

== History ==
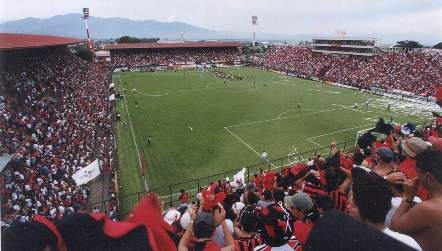
The Estadio Alejandro Morera Soto hosted both the "home" and "away" matches for the Revolution in the 2003 CONCACAF Champions' Cup, as well as "away" matches in 2006 and 2024.

=== First appearances in CONCACAF competitions (2003–2007) ===
The Revolution's first foray into international competition came in the 2003 CONCACAF Champions' Cup, for which they qualified as the runners-up in the 2002 MLS Cup. They faced Liga Deportiva Alajuelense of Costa Rica in a two-legged tie, where the winner is based on the sum (known as the aggregate score) of the scores of a home and an away match. Because of logistical issues, both matches were hosted in Costa Rica. The Revolution were considered to be unlikely to advance because of their lack of international experience. The first leg was played on March 23, 2003, and the Revolution suffered a 4–0 defeat which made it highly unlikely they would move on. In the second leg, played on March 26, goals from Taylor Twellman, Wolde Harris, and Steve Ralston brought the aggregate score within one. The comeback was put to a stop when Alajuelense substitute Rolando Fonseca scored and the Revolution's Shalrie Joseph and Daniel Hernández were sent off. The match ended with a 3–1 result, which was not enough to overturn the first-round deficit, and the Revolution were eliminated from the competition.

The Revolution's next appearance in continental competition was the 2006 CONCACAF Champions' Cup, where they once again played Alajuelense. This time, the team opted to play their home match at the Bermuda National Stadium, which was unpopular with fans who believed that a matchup in March in Foxborough would play to their advantage. However, team officials worried that with the unpredictable weather and poor temperatures, they would need to play on an artificial surface rather than the natural grass surface of Gillette Stadium, which would raise the risk of injury. The first match (the "home" match) was played to a scoreless draw. On the March 9 away leg in Alajuela, Alajuelense's Carlos Hernández scored a 90th minute free kick, which sealed a 1–0 result and the Revolution's elimination.

Two years later, the Revolution again qualified for the competition, which had been rebranded to the CONCACAF Champions League, the name it would hold until the 2023 season. This time, they faced off against Trinidadian champions Joe Public F.C. in the preliminary round. The Revolution were left with a small 2–1 deficit after the away leg in Trinidad, but in the home leg, they were defeated 4–0. This marked the first time an MLS team had lost to a team from the Caribbean in CONCACAF competition, and the first time a side from Trinidad had put up more than three goals against an MLS side.

=== Return to CONCACAF competitions (2022–2024) ===
It took until the 2022 CONCACAF Champions League for the Revolution to make another appearance in CONCACAF competition. This time, they qualified as winners of the MLS Supporter's Shield, which they won in the 2021 season. The Revolution was scheduled to play Cavaly AS of Haiti in the Round of 16, although this matchup was cancelled after the Haitian side failed to secure visas. The team advanced to face Pumas UNAM of Mexico. The first leg was played in snowy conditions at Gillette Stadium, and the Revolution won the match 3–0, which was the first time they held an aggregate lead in official CONCACAF competition. On the away leg, the Revolution were missing starters Andrew Farrell, Matt Turner, and Henry Kessler. They conceded three goals without scoring a goal of their own and were eliminated when they lost 4–3 in a penalty shootout. This loss marked only the second time in the tournament's history that a team with a 3–0 lead in the first leg failed to advance.

The Revolution next qualified for the 2024 tournament, which had rebranded again as the Champions Cup. This time they qualified as a result of their regular season standings the previous year. They were matched against C.A. Independiente de La Chorrera of Panama, winning the road leg 1–0 on February 21 and the home leg 3–0 on February 29. In the second round, they faced Alajuelense, in what was the third time the teams had faced off across the Revolution's five appearances in the tournament. This time, the Revolution won 4–0 at home on March 6 and drew 1–1 on the road on March 14, an aggregate win. They advanced to face Club América. Despite having earned the right to host the second leg of the tie due to their superior record in the competition, the club requested to reverse the order of the ties due to a scheduling conflict with SuperCross at Gillette Stadium. The Revolution were eliminated after losing the home leg 4–0 and the away leg 5–2 at Estadio Azteca.

== Records ==
As of August 2025

=== By season ===
New England Revolution record in CONCACAF competitions
Season	Competition	Round	Opposition	Home leg (Note: Revolution score is given first in each result.)	Away leg	Aggregate	References
2003	CONCACAF Champions Cup	Round of 16	(Costa Rica) Alajuelense	0–4 (Note: The Revolution's home match was played in Alajuelense's stadium, Estadio Alejandro Morera Soto.)	3–1	3–5	
2006	CONCACAF Champions Cup	Quarterfinals	(Costa Rica) Alajuelense	0–0 (Note: The Revolution's home match was played in Bermuda National Stadium.)	0–1	0–1	
2008	CONCACAF Champions League	Preliminary round	(Trinidad and Tobago) Joe Public F.C.	0–4	1–2	1–6	
2022	CONCACAF Champions League	Round of 16	(Haiti) Cavaly AS	(w/o) (Note: Both matches between Cavaly AS and New England Revolution were cancelled due to the withdrawal of Cavaly AS from the competition. New England Revolution advanced to the quarterfinal round on a walkover.)			
2022	CONCACAF Champions League	Quarterfinals	(Mexico) Pumas UNAM	3–0	0–3	3–3 (3–4 p)	
2024	CONCACAF Champions Cup	Round One	(Panama) Independiente	1–0	3–0	4–0	
2024	CONCACAF Champions Cup	Round of 16	(Costa Rica) Alajuelense	4–0	1–1	5–1	
2024	CONCACAF Champions Cup	Quarterfinals	(Mexico) Club América	0–4	2–5	2–9	

=== By location ===
Record by location
Location	Played	Won	Drawn	Lost	Goals for	Goals against
Gillette Stadium	5	3	0	2	8	8
Home venues (other) (Note: In 2003, the Revolution hosted their home match against Liga Deportiva Alajuelense at Estadio Alejandro Morera Soto. In 2006, they hosted their home match against the same opponent at Bermuda National Stadium.)	2	0	1	1	0	4
Away venues	7	2	1	4	10	13
Total	14	5	2	7	18	25

=== By club and country ===
Record by club and country
Country	Club	Pld	W	D	L	GF	GA	GD	W%
Costa Rica	Alajuelense	6	2	2	2	8	7	+1	33.33
Costa Rica	Subtotal	6	2	2	2	8	7	+1	33.33
Mexico	Club América	2	0	0	2	2	9	−7	0.00
Mexico	Pumas UNAM	2	1	0	1	3	3	+0	50.00
Mexico	Subtotal	4	1	0	3	5	12	−7	25.00
Panama	Independiente	2	2	0	0	4	0	+4	100.00
Panama	Subtotal	2	2	0	0	4	0	+4	100.00
(Trinidad and Tobago) Trinidad	Joe Public	2	0	0	2	1	6	−5	0.00
(Trinidad and Tobago) Trinidad	Subtotal	2	0	0	2	1	6	−5	0.00
Total		14	5	2	7	18	25	−7	35.71

== Other competitions ==
=== SuperLiga ===
The North American SuperLiga was an eight-team competition between MLS and Liga MX teams first held in 2007. The Revolution competed in the second season; general manager Craig Tornberg said that they were "disappointed" not to have participated in the first edition. In the group stage, the Revolution hosted two Liga MX teams at Gillette Stadium, Santos Laguna and Pachuca CF, winning both games 1–0. They also played Chivas USA on the road, drawing 1–1, which was enough to secure them a spot in the semifinals. In the semifinals, the Revolution defeated CF Atlante 1–0 in a heated match where four players received red cards. The Revolution won the final against the Houston Dynamo 6–5 in a penalty shoutout after a 2–2 result. This was the club's second trophy, their first being the 2007 U.S. Open Cup.

The Revolution participated again in the 2009 SuperLiga with a chance to retain their title. Their first match was a 4–2 win against a full-strength Santos Laguna side at Gillette Stadium. Their next two group stage matches were at home: a 1–1 draw against the Kansas City Wizards and a 1–0 win over Club Atlas. In the semifinal, they fell 2–1 to the Chicago Fire, ending their participation in the tournament. The next year, the Revolution participated again in the SuperLiga. In the group stage, they defeated each of Pumas UNAM, the Chicago Fire, and Atlético Morelia in 1–0 matches at Gillette Stadium. In the August 4 semifinal against Puebla, the teams tied 1–1, and the Revolution prevailed 5–3 in a penalty shootout. Kenny Mansally scored both the Revolution goal and the winning penalty kick. With this result, they faced Atlético Morelia for a second time in the championship match. Morelia won 2–1, which made them the only Mexican team to win at Gillette Stadium in three years of SuperLiga competition. This was the last SuperLiga match before the tournament's cancellation, which made the Revolution the sole MLS team to have won the trophy.

=== Leagues Cup ===
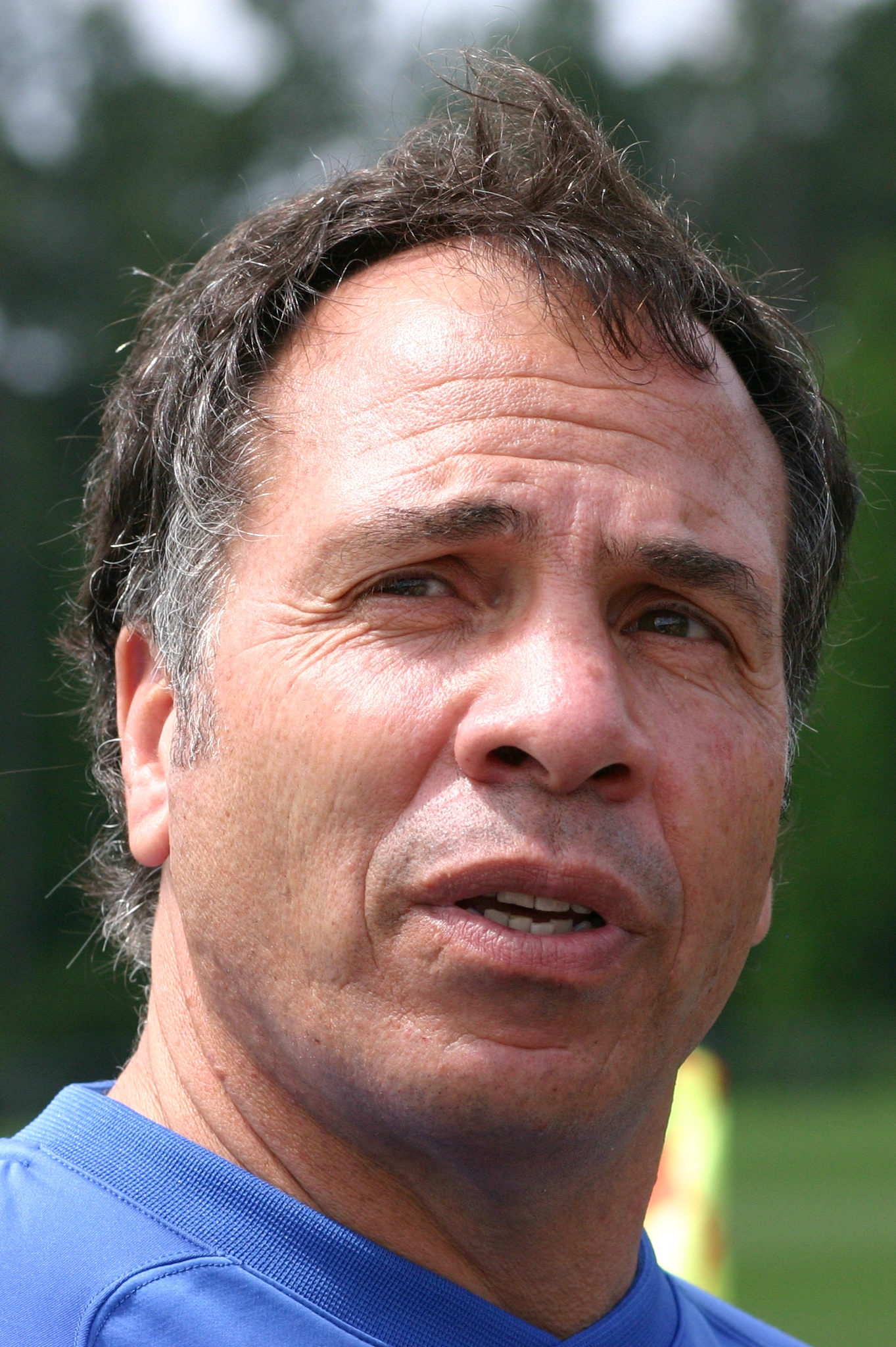
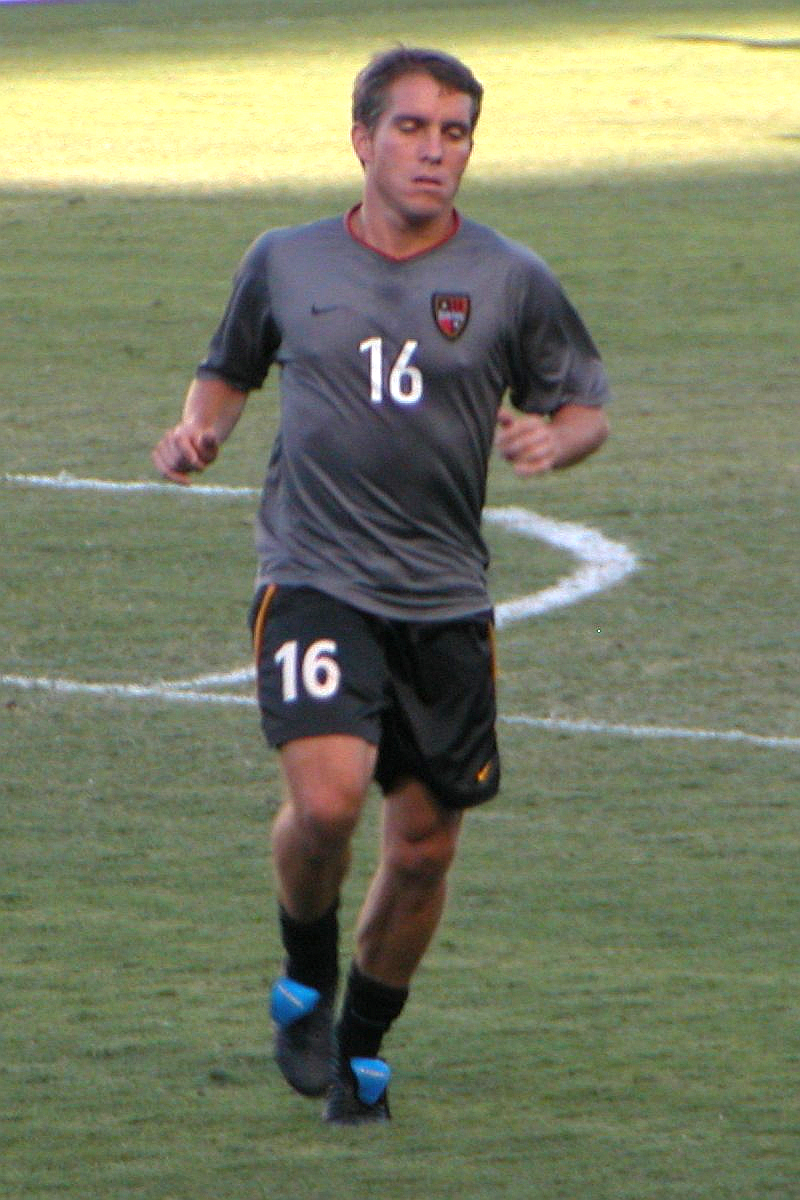
Bruce Arena (left) was placed on administrative leave during the 2023 Leagues Cup, and was replaced by assistant Richie Williams (right, pictured in 2007).

The Leagues Cup is a competition between MLS and Liga MX clubs that started in 2019. Initially held with eight teams, it was expanded to include all 47 teams in the two leagues in the 2023 edition. In that tournament, the Revolution advanced from the group stage with a 0–0 draw against the New York Red Bulls and a 5–1 win against Atlético San Luis. After their last group stage match, the Revolution announced that head coach Bruce Arena had been put on administrative leave for inappropriate conduct. Additionally, in the club's Round of 32 matchup with Club Atlas, goalkeeper Đorđe Petrović chose not to play because the club had turned down transfer offers from English club Nottingham Forest F.C. and French club FC Nantes. With backup goalkeeper Earl Edwards Jr. in net, the Revolution and Atlas drew 2–2. Striker Gustavo Bou scored both of the Revolution's goals. The Revolution advanced after an 8–7 penalty shoutout, with the winning penalty being scored by defender Andrew Farrell. The Revolution next faced Querétaro F.C. (with Petrović back in net), where they drew 1–1 and were eliminated 3–4 in the ensuing penalty shootout. In the 2024 edition of the tournament, the Revolution were drawn in a group with Mazatlán and Nashville SC, with both of their games to be played at Gillette Stadium. The team won their group but was eliminated in the Round of 32 on penalties by New York City FC.

== Record in other competitions ==
=== By season ===
As of August 2025

New England Revolution's record in the SuperLiga and Leagues Cup
Season	Competition	Round	Opposition	Result	Venue	Attendance	References
2008	SuperLiga	Group stage	(Mexico) Santos Laguna	1–0	Gillette Stadium	10,118	
2008	SuperLiga	Group stage	(Mexico) Pachuca	1–0	Gillette Stadium	9,614	
2008	SuperLiga	Group stage	(United States) Chivas USA	1–1	Home Depot Center	4,738	
2008	SuperLiga	Semifinal	(Mexico) Atlante	1–0	Gillette Stadium	8,302	
2008	SuperLiga	Final	(United States) Houston Dynamo	2–2 (6–5 p)	Gillette Stadium	9,232	
2009	SuperLiga	Group stage	(Mexico) Santos Laguna	4–2	Gillette Stadium	9,512	
2009	SuperLiga	Group stage	(United States) Kansas City Wizards	1–1	Gillette Stadium	5,378	
2009	SuperLiga	Group stage	(Mexico) Atlas	1–0	Gillette Stadium	7,411	
2009	SuperLiga	Semifinal	(United States) Chicago Fire	1–2	Gillette Stadium	7,215	
2010	SuperLiga	Group stage	(Mexico) Pumas UNAM	1–0	Gillette Stadium	7,201	
2010	SuperLiga	Group stage	(United States) Chicago Fire	1–0	Toyota Park	16,117	
2010	SuperLiga	Group stage	(Mexico) Atlético Morelia	1–0	Gillette Stadium	8,173	
2010	SuperLiga	Semifinal	(Mexico) Puebla	1–1 (5–3 p)	Gillette Stadium	5,854	
2010	SuperLiga	Final	(Mexico) Atlético Morelia	1–2	Gillette Stadium	10,414	
2023	Leagues Cup	Group stage	(United States) New York Red Bulls	0–0 (2–4 p)	Red Bull Arena	9,139	
2023	Leagues Cup	Group stage	(Mexico) Atlético San Luis	5–1	Gillette Stadium	12,327	
2023	Leagues Cup	Round of 32	(Mexico) Atlas	2–2 (8–7 p)	Gillette Stadium	9,299	
2023	Leagues Cup	Round of 16	(Mexico) Querétaro	1–1 (3–4 p)	Gillette Stadium	8,895	
2024	Leagues Cup	Group stage	(Mexico) Mazatlán	1–0	Gillette Stadium	16,009	
2024	Leagues Cup	Group stage	(United States) Nashville SC	1–1 (5–4 p)	Gillette Stadium	13,538	
2024	Leagues Cup	Round of 32	(United States) New York City FC	1–1 (6–7 p)	Gillette Stadium	7,267	

=== By competition ===
As of August 2025

Record in other competitions by competition
Competition	Played	Won	Drawn	Lost	Goals for	Goals against
North American SuperLiga	14	8	4	2	18	11
Leagues Cup	7	2	5	0	11	6
Total	21	10	9	2	29	17

=== By location ===
As of August 2025

Record in other competitions by location
Location	Played	Won	Drawn	Lost	Goals for	Goals against
Gillette Stadium	18	9	7	2	27	16
Away venues	3	1	2	0	2	1
Total	21	10	7	2	29	17

=== By club and country ===
As of August 2025

Record in other competitions by club and country
Country	Club	Pld	W	D	L	GF	GA	GD	W%
Mexico	Atlante	1	1	0	0	1	0	+1	100.00
Mexico	Atlas	2	1	1	0	3	2	+1	50.00
Mexico	Atlético Morelia	2	1	0	1	2	2	+0	50.00
Mexico	Atlético San Luis	1	1	0	0	5	1	+4	100.00
Mexico	Mazatlán F.C.	1	1	0	0	1	0	+1	100.00
Mexico	Pachuca	1	1	0	0	1	0	+1	100.00
Mexico	Pumas	1	1	0	0	1	0	+1	100.00
Mexico	Puebla	1	0	1	0	1	1	+0	0.00
Mexico	Querétaro	1	0	1	0	1	1	+0	0.00
Mexico	Santos Laguna	2	2	0	0	5	2	+3	100.00
Mexico	Subtotal	13	9	3	1	21	9	+12	69.23
United States	Chicago Fire	2	1	0	1	2	2	+0	50.00
United States	Chivas USA	1	0	1	0	1	1	+0	0.00
United States	Houston Dynamo	1	0	1	0	2	2	+0	0.00
United States	Kansas City Wizards	1	0	1	0	1	1	+0	0.00
United States	Nashville SC	1	0	1	0	1	1	+0	0.00
United States	New York Red Bulls	1	0	1	0	0	0	+0	0.00
United States	New York City FC	1	0	1	0	1	1	+0	0.00
United States	Subtotal	8	1	6	1	8	8	+0	12.50
Total		21	10	9	2	29	17	+12	47.62
