= Pat Noonan =

American soccer coach & player (born 1980)

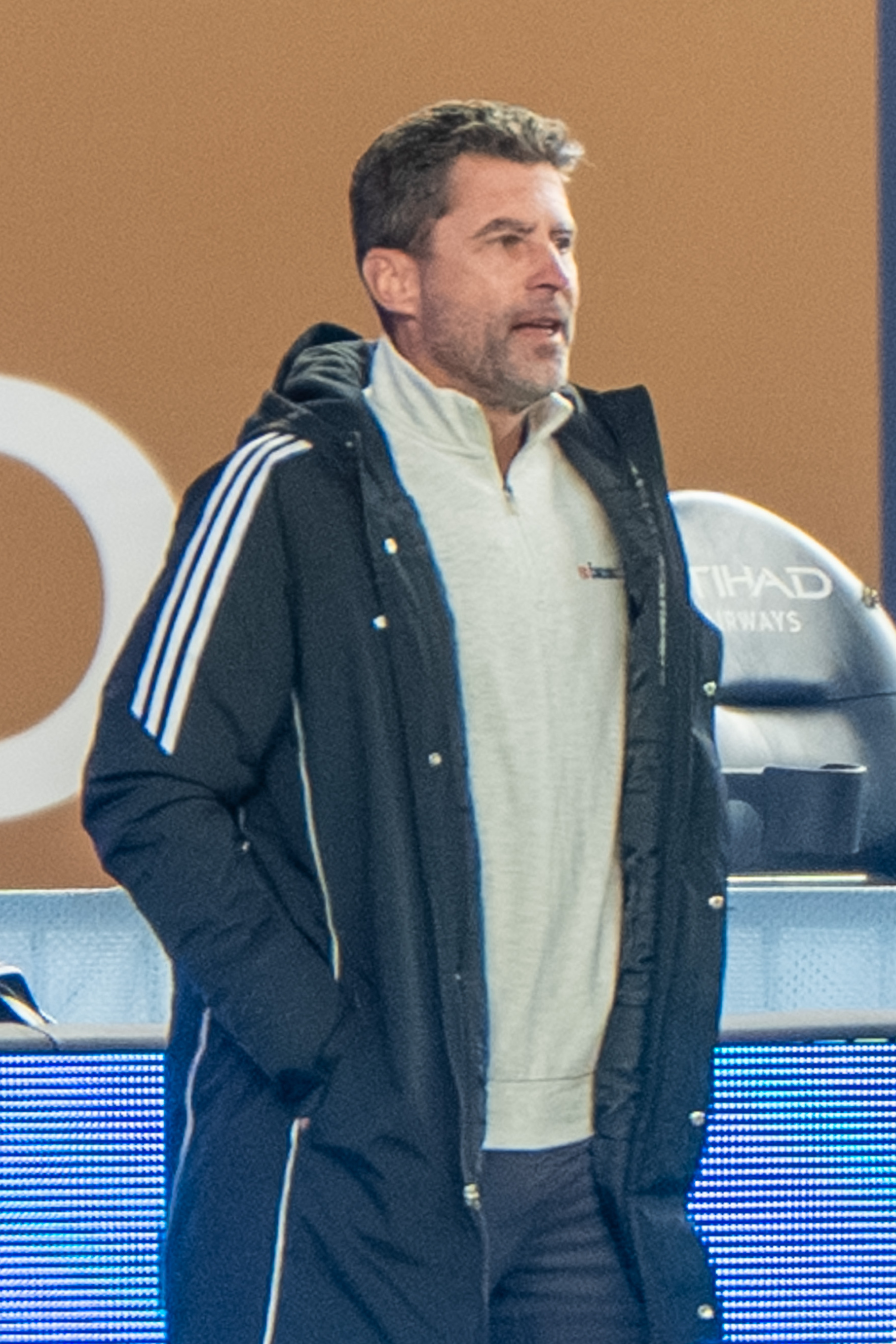
- Noonan coaching FC Cincinnati in 2026

Personal information
- Full name: Patrick John Noonan
- Date of birth: August 2, 1980 (age 46)
- Place of birth: Ballwin, Missouri, United States
- Height: 6 ft 0 in (1.83 m)
- Position: Forward

Team information
- Current team: FC Cincinnati (head coach)

College career
Years	Team	Apps	(Gls)
1999–2002	Indiana Hoosiers	91	(48)

Senior career*
Years	Team	Apps	(Gls)
2002	Mid Michigan Bucks	17	(9)
2003–2007	New England Revolution	119	(37)
2008	Aalesund	8	(0)
2008–2009	Columbus Crew	16	(1)
2009	Colorado Rapids	17	(2)
2010–2011	Seattle Sounders FC	21	(1)
2012	LA Galaxy	10	(1)
Total		208	(51)

International career
2004–2008	United States	15	(1)

Managerial career
- 2021–: FC Cincinnati
Medal record
Representing United States
Winner	CONCACAF Gold Cup	2005
Men's Soccer
- * Club domestic league appearances and goals

Patrick John Noonan (born August 2, 1980) is an American soccer coach and former player. He is the head coach of FC Cincinnati in Major League Soccer.

== Playing career ==
=== College and amateur ===
Noonan attended De Smet Jesuit High School, and played college soccer for the Indiana University Hoosiers from 1999 to 2002. He was named an NSCAA first-team All-American his senior and junior seasons, and second-team All-American his sophomore year. His senior year, he also finished as runner-up to Alecko Eskandarian for the Hermann Trophy. He finished his career at Indiana with 48 goals and 31 assists. During his college years, Noonan also played with the Mid-Michigan Bucks in the USL Premier Development League

=== Club ===
==== New England Revolution ====
Upon graduation, Noonan was selected in the first round (9th overall) of the 2003 MLS SuperDraft by New England Revolution. He made his MLS debut in the 2003 season opener on April 13, coming on as a 92nd-minute substitute for Daniel Hernandez in a 1–1 draw against the Chicago Fire. He recorded his first assist on April 19 in a 2–1 loss to the Columbus Crew. Noonan made his first start on May 31, in a 2–2 draw with the Kansas City Wizards, and scored his first Revolution goal in a 3–3 draw against the MetroStars on July 12. Although he started slowly, Noonan soon resumed his scoring ways, finishing his first season with the Revs with ten goals and seven assists in 28 appearances, and runner-up to Damani Ralph for Rookie of the Year. He was additionally named MLS Player of the Week twice, in weeks 24 and 30, and named MLS Player of the Month for the month of October.

Noonan did even better his sophomore year, the 2004 season, scoring eleven goals and registering eight assists, tying with Amado Guevara for the MLS Scoring Champion Award. He was additionally named MLS Player of the Week for matchweek 10. Alongside three other Revolution players, Noonan was named a 2004 MLS All-Star.

Injuries and a late-season slump saw Noonan end 2005 with eight goals and seven assists, being named MLS Player of the Week for matchweek 13, and representing the Revolution in the 2005 MLS All-Star Game.

Noonan's 2006 campaign was marred by injury and he appeared in only 14 games, netting just one goal. He began in 2007 injured once again and then became a substitute as he regained his fitness. However, he rounded into form and finished the season with 7 goals. Noonan also helped the Revolution win the 2007 U.S. Open Cup, the first piece of silverware in club history, scoring a goal and providing two assists in the final.

Noonan's option for the 2008 season was not picked up by New England and on January 23, 2008, he signed with Norwegian club Aalesunds FK.

==== Columbus Crew ====
On August 6, 2008, Noonan re-signed with MLS and was traded from New England, who still retained his rights, to Columbus Crew in exchange for the Crew's natural first-round selection in the 2009 MLS SuperDraft and allocation money. Additionally, the teams traded spots in the current 2008 allocation standings – with Columbus moving into the 10th spot and New England moving to third – and agreed to considerations regarding 2009 allocation rankings. For Columbus Crew, Noonan won the MLS Supporters' Shield, MLS Cup and Trillium Cup, all of them in 2008.

==== Colorado Rapids ====
Noonan was traded to Colorado Rapids in June 2009. After making seventeen league appearances, Noonan was waived by Colorado on March 23, 2010.

==== Seattle Sounders FC ====
After a short trial with Seattle Sounders FC, Noonan signed with the club on March 30, 2010. He remained with Seattle through the 2011 season. At season's end, the club declined his 2012 contract option and he entered the 2011 MLS Re-Entry Draft.

==== LA Galaxy ====
Noonan was selected by Los Angeles Galaxy in stage two of the draft on December 12, 2011. Eleven days later he signed with Los Angeles.

Noonan remained with Los Angeles through the 2012 season. After the conclusion of the 2012 season, LA declined the 2013 option on Noonan's contract and he entered the 2012 MLS Re-Entry Draft. Noonan became a free agent after he went undrafted in both rounds of the draft. On January 11, 2013, LA announced that Noonan had retired as a player and had joined the club as an assistant coach.

=== International ===
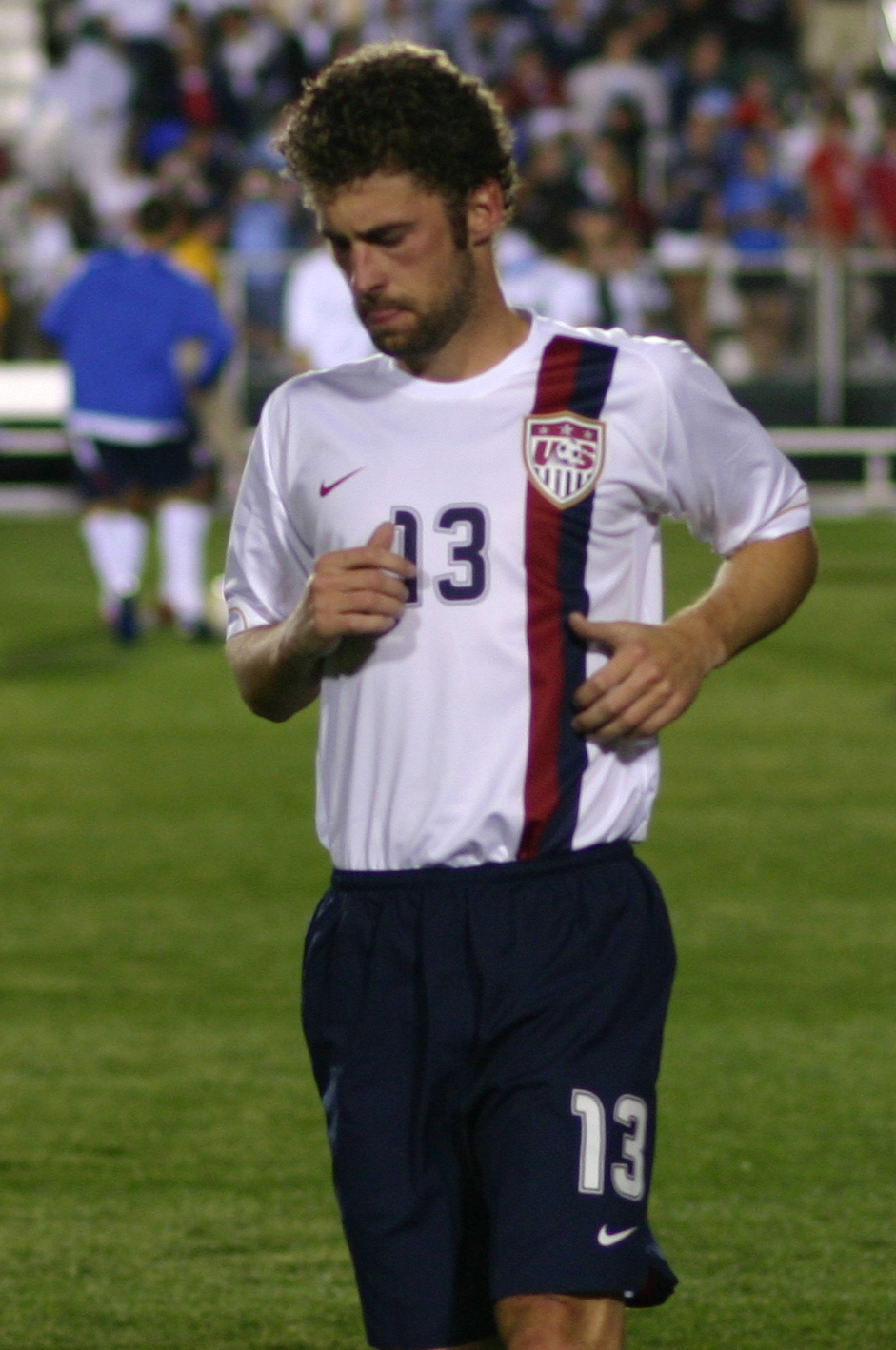
Noonan with the United States in 2006

Noonan earned his first cap for the United States national team on March 13, 2004, against Haiti. While he has accumulated 15 caps, injuries and inconsistency prevented him from claiming a major role with the national team. He was named an alternate for the 2006 U.S. World Cup squad on May 2, 2006. However, in early 2008 he started with the U.S. National Team against Sweden and registered an assist in a 2–0 victory. He did not play for the national team after 2008.

== Coaching career ==
=== United States national team ===
After Noonan's retirement as a player, he joined the Galaxy's technical staff as an assistant coach to Bruce Arena. When Arena was announced as returning to be the head coach of the United States national team, he brought his supporting staff from the Galaxy, including Noonan, to work as assistants.

=== Philadelphia Union ===
In January 2018, Noonan was hired as an assistant coach alongside Jim Curtin at the Philadelphia Union.

=== FC Cincinnati ===
Noonan was named head coach of FC Cincinnati on December 14, 2021. The team had previously finished last in the regular season standings in their three prior MLS seasons. Noonan, along with new general manager Chris Albright, oversaw 24 player changes and the hiring of assistants Kenny Arena and Dominic Kinnear.

He led Cincinnati to fifth place in the Eastern Conference as they clinched their first-ever MLS Cup Playoff berth, Noonan's Orange and Blue beat New York Red Bulls on the road 2–1 before falling to the Philadelphia Union, 1–0, in the Eastern Conference Semifinals.

In the 2023 season, Noonan guided Cincinnati to their first trophy in MLS, finishing top of the league standings, clinching the Supporters' Shield and their second consecutive playoff berth. In the playoffs, Cincinnati made it to the Eastern Conference Finals, falling to the Columbus Crew 3–2. Noonan was named the MLS Coach of the Year on November 21, 2023.

== Career statistics ==
=== Club ===
Appearances and goals by club, season and competition
Club	Season	League			Continental		Other		Total	
Club	Season	Division	Apps	Goals	Apps	Goals	Apps	Goals	Apps	Goals
New England Revolution	2003	Major League Soccer	28	10	—		3 (Note: Appearances in the MLS Cup playoffs)	2	31	12
New England Revolution	2004	Major League Soccer	29	11	—		3	1	32	12
New England Revolution	2005	Major League Soccer	21	8	—		4	1	25	9
New England Revolution	2006	Major League Soccer	14	1	—		3	1	17	2
New England Revolution	2007	Major League Soccer	27	7	—		4	0	31	7
New England Revolution	Total		119	37	0	0	17	4	136	41
Aalesund	2008	Tippeligaen	8	0	—		—		8	0
Columbus Crew	2008	Major League Soccer	11	1	—		—		11	1
Columbus Crew	2009	Major League Soccer	5	0	—		—		5	0
Columbus Crew	Total		16	1	0	0	0	0	16	1
Colorado Rapids	2009	Major League Soccer	17	2	—		—		17	2
Seattle Sounders	2010	Major League Soccer	12	1	—		—		12	1
Seattle Sounders	2011	Major League Soccer	9	0	5 (Note: Appearance(s) in the CONCACAF Champions League)	0	—		14	2
Seattle Sounders	Total		21	1	5	0	0	0	26	1
LA Galaxy	2012	Major League Soccer	10	1	3	0	—		13	1
Career total			191	42	8	0	17	4	216	46

=== International ===
Scores and results list the United States' goal tally first, score column indicates score after each Noonan goal.

List of international goals scored by Pat Noonan
No.	Date	Venue	Opponent	Score	Result	Competition
1	March 9, 2005	Fullerton, California	Colombia	1–0	3–0	Friendly match

== Coaching statistics ==
As of match played November 19, 2026

Coaching record by team and tenure
Team	Nat	From	To	Record							
Team	Nat	From	To	G	W	D	L	GF	GA	GD	Win %
FC Cincinnati	(United States)	December 14, 2021	Present	215	105	52	58	386	321	+65	48.84
Total				215	105	52	58	386	321	+65	48.84

== Honors ==
=== As a player ===
Columbus Crew

- MLS Cup: 2008
- Supporters' Shield: 2008

New England Revolution

- U.S. Open Cup: 2007

Seattle Sounders FC

- U.S. Open Cup: 2010, 2011

Los Angeles Galaxy

- MLS Cup: 2012

United States

- CONCACAF Gold Cup 2005

=== As a coach ===
FC Cincinnati

- Supporters' Shield: 2023

Individual

- MLS Coach of the Year: 2023
