= Jacob LeBlanc =

American soccer player

Personal information
- Full name: Jacob LeBlanc
- Date of birth: February 2, 1981 (age 45)
- Place of birth: Auburn, California, United States
- Height: 5 ft 11 in (1.80 m)
- Position: Midfielder

Youth career
- Virginia Cavaliers

Senior career*
Years	Team	Apps	(Gls)
2003	MetroStars	7	(2)
- * Club domestic league appearances and goals

Jacob LeBlanc (born February 2, 1981, in Auburn, California) is an American retired professional soccer player.

== Playing career ==
LeBlanc decided to forgo his final year of college and sign with Major League Soccer in 2003.

== Statistics ==
Club performance			League		Cup		League Cup		Continental		Total	
Season	Club	League	Apps	Goals	Apps	Goals	Apps	Goals	Apps	Goals	Apps	Goals
USA			League		Open Cup		League Cup		North America		Total	
2003	MetroStars	MLS	7	2	1	0	0	0	0	0	8	2
Career total			7	2	1	0	0	0	0	0	8	2
