= Thiago Corrêa =

Brazilian footballer

Personal information
- Full name: Thiago da Rosa Corrêa
- Date of birth: April 7, 1982 (age 44)
- Place of birth: Porto Alegre, Brazil
- Height: 1.69 m (5 ft 6 1/2 in)
- Position: Midfielder

Team information
- Current team: São Luiz

Youth career
- Internacional

Senior career*
Years	Team	Apps	(Gls)
2003	Internacional	0	(0)
2004	Pinhalense		
2004–2007	Chicago Fire	71	(9)
2008	Sertãozinho	0	(0)
2008	União de Leiria	2	(0)
2009	Ulbra	0	(0)
2009–2010	Porto Alegre	10	(0)
2010	Caxias do Sul	1	(0)
2011	Inter de Santa Maria	10	(0)
- * Club domestic league appearances and goals

Thiago da Rosa Corrêa (born April 7, 1982), known as Thiago, Thiago Gaúcho or Thiago Corrêa, is a Brazilian footballer, who plays for São Luiz.

== Biography ==
Thiago joined the youth program of his local club Sport Club Internacional at the age of 12. He made his professional debut with the club in 2003, before moving to Ginásio Pinhalense de Esportes Atléticos the following year. He had a trial with Chicago Fire in the summer of 2004 and joined the club before the 2005 MLS season. Thiago had a successful debut campaign, scoring six goals and seven assists. Thiago was released by the Fire in September 2007.

He returned to Brazil in 2008 with Campeonato Paulista side Sertãozinho before moving to União de Leiria in Portuguese Liga de Honra that same year. After just two games he returned to Brazil with Campeonato Gaúcho side Ulbra. He joined Porto Alegre in June 2009 for 2009 Campeonato Gaúcho Segunda Divisão. Thiago played at 2010 Campeonato Gaúcho, which he scored 3 goal in 10 appearances before moving to Caxias do Sul. He played once in 2010 Campeonato Brasileiro Série C, on August 15, replacing Marcelo Costa at half time.

== Honours ==
- U.S. Open Cup: 2006
- Campeonato Gaúcho Segunda Divisão: 2009
