= Jason Moore (soccer) =

American soccer player (born 1978)

Personal information
- Date of birth: April 4, 1978 (age 48)
- Place of birth: Decatur, Georgia, U.S.
- Height: 5 ft 11 in (1.80 m)
- Position: Midfielder

Youth career
- 1997–1998: Virginia Cavaliers

Senior career*
Years	Team	Apps	(Gls)
1999	D.C. United	16	(0)
1999	→ MLS Pro 40 (loan)	3	(0)
2000–2001	Colorado Rapids	53	(0)
2002	Chicago Fire	10	(1)
2003	New England Revolution	13	(0)
Total		95	(1)

International career
- United States U17
1997	United States U20	10	(0)

Managerial career
- 2013–: Greater Lowell United FC
- * Club domestic league appearances and goals

Jason Moore is an American retired soccer midfielder who spent five seasons in Major League Soccer. He was a member of the United States men's national under-17 soccer team which went to the quarterfinals of the 1993 FIFA U-17 World Championship.

== College ==
Moore attended the University of Virginia where he played two seasons on the men's soccer team. In 1997, he played as a defender before moving into the midfield for the 1998 season. He was a 1998 Second Team All American. He left college after his sophomore season to turn professional.

== Professional ==
In February 1999, D.C. United selected Moore with the first overall pick of the 1999 MLS College Draft. On February 18, 2000, United traded Moore to the Colorado Rapids in exchange for the Rapids’ 2001 MLS SuperDraft first round pick. He spent two seasons with Colorado before being waived. The Chicago Fire claimed him of waivers in April 2002. On April 11, 2003, the Fire traded Moore to the New England Revolution for the Fire's fourth round selection in the 2004 MLS SuperDraft.

== International ==
Moore played four games for the United States men's national under-17 soccer team which went to the quarterfinals of the 1993 FIFA U-17 World Championship. In 1997, Moore played ten times for the United States men's national under-20 soccer team.

== Managerial ==
In 2013, Jason was named to his first head coaching job at Greater Lowell United FC of the National Premier Soccer League.
