= Kyle Singer =

American soccer player

Kyle Singer (born August 6, 1980, in Plymouth, Minnesota) is an American soccer player who last played goalkeeper for the New England Revolution of Major League Soccer.

Singer played college soccer at the University of Virginia from 1998 to 2001, and Boston College in 2002. After three mediocre seasons (and one redshirt) at UVA, Singer transferred to BC for his senior season. Unable to earn a starting position at UVA, Singer quickly established himself; he set a school record by recording 12 shutouts, and was named first team All-New England and the Big East Goalkeeper of the Year.

Upon graduating, Singer was selected 29th overall in the 2003 MLS SuperDraft by the local New England Revolution. Singer only played 9 minutes as a rookie, and only spent one minute in goal, playing the other 8 as a field player. However, he spent eight games with the New Hampshire Phantoms of the PSL, with whom he posted 7 wins and 4 shutouts. Singer did not see any playing time in 2004, as Adin Brown and Matt Reis were too formidable a player to break through, but again saw significant time with the Phantoms. Playing in 10 games, Singer posted a record of 7 wins, 2 losses, and 1 tie, while allowing only 1.23 goals per game. Without Singer in goal, the Phantoms posted a record of 3 wins and 7 losses.
