= Daouda Kanté =

Malian footballer

Daouda Kante
Personal information
- Date of birth: July 16, 1978 (age 48)
- Place of birth: Hamdallaye, Mali
- Height: 6 ft 2 in (1.88 m)
- Position: Defender

College career
Years	Team	Apps	(Gls)
1998	Mercer Vikings		
1999–2001	FIU Golden Panthers		

Senior career*
Years	Team	Apps	(Gls)
- Central Jersey Riptide
- Tampa Bay Hawks
2002	D.C. United	0	(0)
2002	→ Wilmington Hammerheads (loan)		
2002	→ Hampton Roads Mariners (loan)	2	(0)
2002–2004	New England Revolution	26	(1)
2004	St. Louis Steamers (indoor)	1	(0)
2004–2006	Baltimore Blast (indoor)	11	(0)
- * Club domestic league appearances and goals

Daouda Kante (born July 16, 1978) is a Malian retired footballer who played as a defender. He spent three seasons in Major League Soccer, and two in the Major Indoor Soccer League. Currently, he is the executive and technical director for Kansas Rush Soccer – Olathe.

== Youth ==
A native of Mali, Kante attended Saint Benedict's Preparatory School in New Jersey, United States, where he played on the school's 1996 state championship soccer team. In 1998, he entered Mercer Community College where he was a junior college All-American soccer player. In 1999, he transferred to Florida International University. He began his career with the Golden Panthers in midfield, but moved to defense in 2000. In February 2001, the Miami Fusion selected Kanté in the 6th round (64th overall) of the 2001 MLS SuperDraft. However, he chose not to sign with the Fusion in order to complete his degree. He graduated with a bachelor's degree in international business and international relations.

== Professional ==
During his collegiate career, he played for the Central Jersey Riptide and the Tampa Bay Hawks of the Premier Development League. In 2002, D.C. United drafted Kanté in the first round (11th overall) in the 2002 MLS SuperDraft, but he never played a first team game. Instead, D.C. sent him on loan to the Wilmington Hammerheads of the USL D-3 Pro League at the end of April. He played two games on loan to the Hampton Roads Mariners in June 2002. United waived him on June 3, 2002, and on July 19, 2002, the New England Revolution signed Kanté as a transitional international. He played well for the Revolution that season, but injury and fitness issues led to him seeing little playing time over the next two seasons. The Revolution released him in 2004. In the fall of 2004, he signed with the St. Louis Steamers of Major Indoor Soccer League. He played only one game before being traded to the Baltimore Blast in exchange for a third round pick in the 2006 MISL Amateur Draft. He finished his career with the Blast in the 2005–2006 season.
