= José Cancela =

Uruguayan footballer (born 1976)

Personal information
- Full name: José Carlos Cancela Durán
- Date of birth: June 25, 1976 (age 50)
- Place of birth: Santa Lucía, Uruguay
- Height: 1.77 m (5 ft 9 1/2 in)
- Position: Midfielder

Senior career*
Years	Team	Apps	(Gls)
1995–2000	Peñarol	43	(2)
2000–2001	Puebla	17	(1)
2001–2002	Cruz Azul	0	(0)
2002–2003	Saprissa	21	(6)
2003–2006	New England Revolution	84	(6)
2007	Colorado Rapids	11	(1)
2008	Fénix	9	(1)
2008–2009	Liberia Mía	29	(2)
2009–2012	Herediano	110	(30)
2012–2013	Saprissa	38	(8)
2013–2014	Herediano	33	(5)
2014	Belén	12	(4)
2015	Pérez Zeledón	35	(4)
Total		442	(70)

Managerial career
- 2019: Veracruz (assistant)
- 2019–2020: Cruz Azul (assistant)
- 2021: Tijuana (assistant)
- 2022: Al-Ahli (assistant)
- 2023: Cruz Azul (assistant)
- * Club domestic league appearances and goals

José Carlos Cancela Durán (born June 25, 1976) is a Uruguayan football coach and a former player who played as an attacking midfielder. He is nicknamed "Pepe".

Before joining the Colorado Rapids, Cancela played the preseason with Toronto FC but was traded to the Denver-based club the day before the regular season began. Cancela played for Peñarol, Cruz Azul, Deportivo Saprissa, and the New England Revolution. He had to leave Saprissa, despite being loved by their fans, because of the rule implemented by the "Morados" after 2003, by which they could only use Costa Rican players in their team.

Cancela joined the Revolution in July 2003, and immediately added an attacking flair not often seen in MLS. He immediately slotted into the starting lineup, and finished the season with a goal and seven assists in 13 games. Cancela struggled a little in his second year, as Clint Dempsey emerged as a competitor for the attacking midfield position, but finished the year with three goals and ten assists in 25 games. He scored two goals and five assists in 2005.

After the 2006 season, Cancela was taken by Toronto FC in the 2006 MLS Expansion Draft, but dealt to the Colorado Rapids in April of the following year in exchange for a Youth International slot to be held by Toronto until 2009. He was waived by the Rapids before the 2008 season.
