= Carlos Llamosa =

American soccer player (born 1969)

Personal information
- Full name: Carlos Llamosa
- Date of birth: June 30, 1969 (age 57)
- Place of birth: Palmira, Valle del Cauca, Colombia
- Height: 5 ft 11 in (1.80 m)
- Position: Defender

Senior career*
| Years | Team | Apps | (Gls) |
| 1986–1989 | Colmena | 67 | (4) |
| 1990 | Huila | 21 | (3) |
| 1995–1996 | New York Centaurs | 26 | (3) |
| 1997–2000 | D.C. United | 73 | (3) |
| 2001 | Miami Fusion | 20 | (0) |
| 2002–2005 | New England Revolution | 38 | (0) |
| 2006–2007 | Chivas USA | 13 | (0) |
| Total | | 258 | (13) |

International career^{‡}
| 1998–2002 | United States | 29 | (0) |

Managerial career
- 2010–2012: Chivas USA (assistant)
- 2013–2016: New York Cosmos (assistant)
- 2017: New England Revolution (assistant)
- 2018–2023: Portland Timbers (assistant)
- 2025–: San Antonio FC
- * Club domestic league appearances and goals as of April 2, 2009 ‡ National team caps and goals as of April 2, 2009

Carlos Llamosa (born June 30, 1969) is a former Colombian-born American professional soccer player who played as a defender. He is currently the head coach of USL Championship club San Antonio FC.

== Early life and education ==
Llamosa began his professional soccer career in 1986 with Colombian third division club Colmena. In 1990, he moved to Colombian first division side Huila. In 1991, Llamosa emigrated to the United States to join the rest of his family, which was at the time living in Queens, New York City. Llamosa found a job at the World Trade Center, where he was working during the terrorist attack in 1993.

== Playing career ==
In 1995, Llamosa reignited his professional career, playing a season with the New York Centaurs of the A-League. In his second season with the club, renamed the Fever, Llamosa was named to the All A-League first team.

Llamosa was subsequently picked up by D.C. United in the 1997 MLS Supplemental Draft, and soon earned a starting spot on the team, finishing the season with 20 starts in 25 games played, while helping the team to a second consecutive MLS Cup. Llamosa remained a fixture in 1998, starting every game that he played in. On October 23, 1998, Llamosa was naturalized as a U.S. citizen, and earned his first cap on November 6 against Australia, just two weeks after becoming a U.S. citizen. Llamosa would go on to play in 29 games for the United States, including the 1999 Confederations Cup and 2002 World Cup Qualifiers. He made two substitute appearances during the 2002 FIFA World Cup.

Llamosa remained with D.C. for the 1999 season, again starting every game he played, including the 1999 MLS Cup, where he helped United to their third championship. Llamosa again was a fixture for United in 2000, starting 20 games and playing 1974 minutes. However, at the end of the 2000 season he was traded to the Miami Fusion in exchange for Brian Kamler and a first round draft pick.

Llamosa continued his solid play with the Fusion, organizing the defense of one of league's best-ever offensive teams, making 20 starts and playing 1827 minutes. After the Fusion folded at the end of 2001, Llamosa was selected 5th overall in the 2002 MLS Allocation Draft by the New England Revolution. He would play a significant role for the team over the next two seasons, helping lead the Revs to a 2002 MLS Cup appearance, and starting 23 games for the team in 2003. Llamosa missed all of the 2004 season, however, after injuring his ACL during preseason. He was released in early 2005. In 2006, Llamosa came back to the league, signing with Chivas USA. Llamosa was waived by Chivas USA at the end of the 2007 season.

== Coaching ==
Llamosa first joined the coaching ranks in 2010 as an assistant coach for Chivas USA. He spent three seasons with the club before joining the New York Cosmos as an assistant coach on February 7, 2013.

Llamosa was part of the Cosmos coaching staff for the team's return to professional soccer after 28 years dormant. Llamosa helped guide the Cosmos to an undefeated record at home (W-D-L: 5–2–0) and the 2013 North American Soccer League Fall Season title with an overall record of 31 points from 14 games (W-D-L: 9–4–1). The Cosmos would cap the season by winning the 2013 NASL Soccer Bowl, defeating the Atlanta Silverbacks 1–0 to take home the title. Llamosa is currently joined by fellow assistant coaches Alecko Eskandarian and fellow Colombian Guillermo "Memo" Valencia on the Cosmos' coaching staff working under head coach Giovanni Savarese.

In December 2024, Llamosa was named head coach for San Antonio FC in the USL Championship.

== Career statistics ==
| Club performance | | | League | | Cup | | League Cup | | Continental | | Total | |
| Season | Club | League | Apps | Goals | Apps | Goals | Apps | Goals | Apps | Goals | Apps | Goals |
| U.S. | | | League | | Open Cup | | League Cup | | North America | | Total | |
|---|---|---|---|---|---|---|---|---|---|---|---|---|
| 1997 | D.C. United | Major League Soccer | 25 | 0 | | | | | | | | |
| 1998 | D.C. United | Major League Soccer | 18 | 0 | | | | | | | | |
| 1999 | D.C. United | Major League Soccer | 17 | 1 | | | | | | | | |
| 2000 | D.C. United | Major League Soccer | 23 | 2 | | | | | | | | |
| 2001 | Miami Fusion | Major League Soccer | 20 | 0 | | | | | | | | |
| 2002 | New England Revolution | Major League Soccer | 14 | 0 | | | | | | | | |
| 2003 | New England Revolution | Major League Soccer | 24 | 0 | | | | | | | | |
| 2004 | New England Revolution | Major League Soccer | 0 | 0 | | | | | | | | |
| 2005 | New England Revolution | Major League Soccer | 0 | 0 | | | | | | | | |
| 2006 | Chivas USA | Major League Soccer | 13 | 0 | | | | | | | | |
| 2007 | Chivas USA | Major League Soccer | 0 | 0 | | | | | | | | |
| Total | U.S. | | 154 | 3 | | | | | | | | |
| Career total | | | 154 | 3 | | | | | | | | |

== Honors ==
Individual

- MLS All-Star: 1999
- MLS Best XI: 2001
