= Marshall Leonard =

American soccer defender and midfielder (born 1980)

Personal information
- Full name: Marshall Leonard
- Date of birth: December 29, 1980 (age 45)
- Place of birth: El Paso, Texas, United States
- Height: 5 ft 7 in (1.70 m)
- Position: Defender

College career
Years	Team	Apps	(Gls)
1998–2001	Virginia Cavaliers		

Senior career*
Years	Team	Apps	(Gls)
2002–2007	New England Revolution	63	(1)
- * Club domestic league appearances and goals as of 14 May 2007 ‡ National team caps and goals as of 12 June 2006

Marshall Leonard (born December 29, 1980, in El Paso, Texas) is an American soccer defender and midfielder, who last played for the New England Revolution of Major League Soccer.

Leonard is African American. He attended high school in Columbus, Georgia, earning varsity letters at both Shaw High School and Brookstone School. He went on to play college soccer at the University of Virginia from 1998 to 2001. Leonard played and started in a total of 89 games at UVA while scoring one goal and 8 assists.

Leonard was selected 45th overall in the 2002 MLS SuperDraft, and signed to a developmental contract. After spending his first year entirely on the bench, Leonard came on strong at the end of 2003, appearing in ten games, including five starts. He developed into a consistent starter in 2004, and when Joe Franchino went down with an injury, Leonard took his spot at left back; he finished the year with one assist in 22 starts. In 2005, while playing most of the year at the left wing spot, he scored a goal and an assist. He was waived by New England in 2007.

Following his retirement from soccer, Leonard graduated from the Stony Brook School of Medicine in 2016. He later completed his residency in emergency medicine at Stony Brook University Hospital in 2019.

== Honors ==
=== New England Revolution ===
- Lamar Hunt U.S. Open Cup (1): 2007
