= Rusty Pierce =

American soccer player

Personal information
- Full name: Rusty Curtis Pierce
- Date of birth: July 24, 1979 (age 47)
- Place of birth: The Woodlands, Texas, United States
- Height: 5 ft 10 in (1.78 m)
- Position: Defender

College career
Years	Team	Apps	(Gls)
1997–1999	UNC Greensboro Spartans		

Senior career*
Years	Team	Apps	(Gls)
2000–2004	New England Revolution	113	(0)
2005	Real Salt Lake	15	(0)
2006–2007	Columbus Crew	39	(0)
2009	Wilmington Hammerheads	4	(0)
Total		171	(0)
- * Club domestic league appearances and goals

Rusty Pierce (born July 24, 1979, in The Woodlands, Texas) is an American former professional soccer player who spent eight seasons in Major League Soccer.

== Career ==
=== College ===
Pierce played college soccer at the University of North Carolina at Greensboro from 1997 to 1999, appearing in 51 games during his time there. Following his junior season, Pierce signed a Project-40 contract with Major League Soccer, entering the 2000 MLS SuperDraft, where he was selected 14th overall by the New England Revolution.

=== Professional ===
==== New England Revolution ====
The Revolution selected Pierce in the SuperDraft on February 6, 2000. As a rookie, Pierce quickly earned a place in the Revolution starting lineup with his tenacious defending, and finished the season second on the team in minutes played, having started in 29 of the team's 32 games. Pierce made his Revolution debut (and first start) on March 18 against the Miami Fusion in the season opener, and his home debut on April 15 against D.C. United in the Revolution's home opener. He was named Revolution Defender of the Year for the 2000 season, and re-signed with the Revolution on March 20, 2001.

Pierce remained a constant in the New England backline for the next four years when healthy, although injuries limited his playing time in the 2002 and 2004 seasons.

==== Later career ====
Following the 2004 season, Pierce's impending free agency led the Revolution to leave him unprotected for the 2004 MLS Expansion Draft, where he was selected in the eighth round by Real Salt Lake. After the 2005 season, his rights were traded to the Columbus Crew, where he played 2 years

Following a year out of soccer, during which Pierce founded a financial investment company and worked as a real estate broker in Myrtle Beach, South Carolina, Pierce returned to the game in 2009 to play for the Wilmington Hammerheads in the USL Second Division.
