= MLS Cup 2007 =

2007 edition of the MLS Cup

- Event: MLS Cup
New England Revolution	Houston Dynamo
1	2
- Date: November 18, 2007
- Venue: Robert F. Kennedy Memorial Stadium, Washington, D.C., US
- MLS Cup MVP: Dwayne De Rosario (Houston Dynamo)
- Referee: Alex Prus
- Attendance: 39,859
- Weather: Cloudy, 55 °F (13 °C)

MLS Cup 2007 was the 12th edition of the MLS Cup, the post-season championship match of Major League Soccer (MLS) in the United States. It was played on November 18, 2007, at Robert F. Kennedy Memorial Stadium in Washington, D.C., between the New England Revolution and Houston Dynamo in a rematch of the previous edition. The match determined the championship of the 2007 season and was attended by 39,859 spectators.

Houston won the match 2–1 after falling behind on a Revolution goal scored by Taylor Twellman in the 20th minute. The Dynamo made a tactical change in the second half that yielded two goals from Joseph Ngwenya and Dwayne De Rosario, the latter of whom was named the match's most valuable player. The Dynamo became the second team to win consecutive MLS Cups, while New England lost their third consecutive and fourth overall cup.

== Venue ==
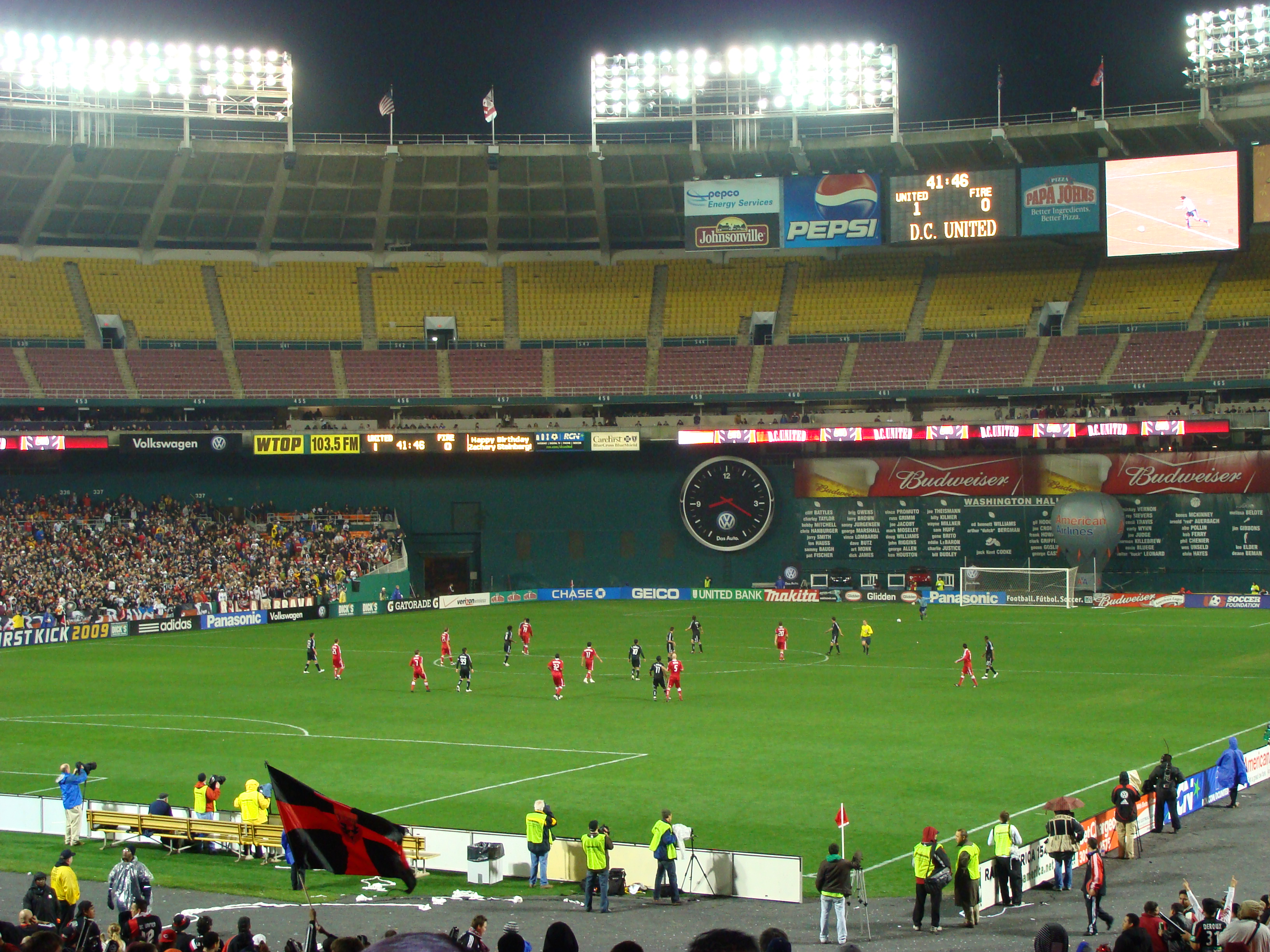
RFK Memorial Stadium in Washington, D.C. hosted MLS Cup 2007

MLS Cup 2007 was hosted at Robert F. Kennedy Memorial Stadium in Washington, D.C., the home of four-time champions D.C. United. The stadium had previously hosted the MLS Cup in 1997 and 2000, and was announced as the host of a third cup on December 14, 2006. The decision to use RFK Stadium came after several editions at smaller soccer-specific stadiums that had recently opened for MLS teams. D.C. United shared the stadium with the Washington Nationals baseball team, requiring turf and seat reconfiguration between games; the league announced plans to re-sod the field and add temporary seating if necessary during the weeks before the cup. RFK Stadium was opened in 1961 for baseball and football, but grew to host major national and international soccer events, including the United States men's national team. The North American Soccer League's Soccer Bowl was staged there in 1980, as well as group stage matches during the 1994 FIFA World Cup, the 1996 Olympics men's soccer tournament, and the 2003 FIFA Women's World Cup. It was also the host venue of the 1996 U.S. Open Cup Final and the MLS All-Star Game in 2002 and 2004.

== Road to the final ==
The MLS Cup is the post-season championship of Major League Soccer (MLS), a professional club soccer league based in the United States and Canada. The 2007 season was the twelfth in the league's history and was contested by 13 teams in two conferences, divided into the east and west. Each team played a total of 30 matches in the regular season from April to October, facing other teams twice and playing an additional six matches against teams within their conference—with teams in the Western Conference playing an additional intra-conference match. The post-season playoffs ran from late October to November and was contested by the top two teams in each conference and four wild card teams in the next positions regardless of conference. It was organized into three rounds: a home-and-away series in the Conference Semifinals, a single-match Conference Final, and the MLS Cup final.

The 2007 edition of the MLS Cup was contested by the New England Revolution and the Houston Dynamo in a rematch of the 2006 final—the first MLS Cup rematch featuring the same teams in consecutive years. The finalists both finished second in their respective conferences and met twice in the regular season, with the Revolution winning 1–0 in May on the road in Houston and drawing 3–3 at home with the Dynamo in July. Under the new playoff qualification format, five teams from the Eastern Conference participated in the playoffs while the Western Conference had three. As the eighth seed overall, the Kansas City Wizards were placed in the Western Conference bracket. The 2007 season also marked the introduction of the Designated Player Rule, which allowed clubs to bypass salary cap requirements for up to three marquee players. Unlike other clubs, the Revolution and Dynamo did not immediately take advantage of the new rule to sign a marquee player.

=== New England Revolution ===
The New England Revolution had won the Eastern Conference Championship for the fourth time in their history, following three defeats at the MLS Cup in 2002, 2005, and 2006. The team was managed by Steve Nicol and remained mostly unchanged from their previous seasons, losing Clint Dempsey to a transfer and José Cancela in the expansion draft, but found replacements in Amaechi Igwe and Wells Thompson from the SuperDraft. The Revolution began the season with injuries to Shalrie Joseph, Pat Noonan, Michael Parkhurst, and Joe Franchino that kept them out of the starting lineup for several weeks, but earned 17 points in their first eight matches with a five-win record.

The Revolution went undefeated across six matches in July and continued to remain atop the Eastern Conference standings ahead of the New York Red Bulls and D.C. United. New England made few changes to their roster during the summer transfer window, adding Gambian duo Abdoulie Mansally and Sainey Nyassi and recalling a loaned player, relying on their core group of veteran and rookies like Igwe, Thompson, and Adam Cristman. Parkhurst returned from an injury and earned Defender of the Year honors and was named to the MLS Best XI alongside Joseph. Despite falling behind the pace set by the team in previous seasons and conceding the first-place spot to D.C. United, the Revolution clinched a playoff berth and finished the season in second place with 50 points and a 14–8–8 record. New England also won the U.S. Open Cup in October against FC Dallas—the club's first trophy in five attempts.

New England entered the playoffs on a three-match winless streak and faced the third-seeded New York Red Bulls in the Conference Semifinal. After a scoreless draw in the first leg hosted by the Red Bulls in New Jersey, the Revolution won 1–0 on a 64th-minute goal by Taylor Twellman and advanced to their sixth consecutive Eastern Conference Final. The team hosted the Eastern Conference Final against the fourth-place Chicago Fire, who had upset D.C. United with a 3–2 aggregate win. New England defeated Chicago 1–0 in the conference final, with the lone goal coming in the 38th minute from a bicycle kick by Twellman, and clinched a berth in their third consecutive MLS Cup final. Matt Reis maintained a clean sheet through the team's three playoff matches.

=== Houston Dynamo ===
The Houston Dynamo were relocated from San Jose in December 2005 and retained most of their roster from their move before their run to win the MLS Cup over New England in 2006. The roster remained mostly unchanged as they entered the 2007 season, adding forward Nate Jaqua in a trade from the Los Angeles Galaxy and drafting defender Corey Ashe to replace Adrian Serioux after he left to join FC Dallas. Richard Mulrooney was traded to Houston from Toronto FC after two matches in exchange for Kevin Goldthwaite. While the Dynamo did not sign a Designated Player, the club sought an international signing to bolster its roster.

Houston began the season with two wins in their first eight matches, with close 1–0 losses to several teams. After a win against in-state rivals FC Dallas in early June, the Dynamo embarked on an eleven-match unbeaten streak that included eight wins and three draws as well as a league-record 726-minute shutout streak for goalkeeper Pat Onstad. The unbeaten run brought Houston to first place in the Western Conference and came with the loss of midfielder of Brad Davis to a knee injury and a congested schedule featuring SuperLiga and U.S. Open Cup matches. The team used its reserves to rotate out players and saw the emergence of forwards Jaqua, Stuart Holden, and Joseph Ngwenya as key goalscorers alongside starters Brian Ching and Dwayne De Rosario.

The unbeaten streak was briefly interrupted for the Dynamo with a pair of 1–0 losses to Real Salt Lake and the Colorado Rapids in early August, which caused them to fall behind FC Dallas in the conference standings. Houston then continued with strong offensive performances and lost only one of their remaining nine matches, but were eclipsed in conference rankings by Chivas USA in the final match. The Dynamo finished the regular season in second place with 52 points from a 15–8–7 record and conceded 23 goals, the fewest of any MLS team. The team would enter the playoffs without midfielder Ricardo Clark, who was suspended nine matches for kicking Carlos Ruiz during a match against FC Dallas on September 30.

In the Western Conference Semifinals, the Houston Dynamo played against FC Dallas and lost the opening leg 1–0 in a repeat of the series against Chivas USA in the previous year's semifinals. After a goal by Carlos Ruiz in the 14th minute to give Dallas a 2–0 aggregate lead, the Dynamo took advantage of a red card shown to Arturo Álvarez to press forward with a 3–5–2 formation. Stuart Holden was substituted during the formation switch and scored in the 67th minute to tie the match; a series-equalizing goal came five minutes later from Brian Ching, who received a through pass from De Rosario. The match went to extra time, where Ching added a second goal in the 97th minute to lead on aggregate and Brad Davis scored Houston's fourth and final goal with a free kick in the 100th minute. The Dynamo won the match 4–1 and the series 4–2 on aggregate, advancing to a second consecutive Western Conference Final against the Kansas City Wizards, who were seeded from the East as a wild card team and defeated Chivas USA. With more than 30,000 spectators at Robertson Stadium, the Houston Dynamo repeated as Western Conference Champions by defeating Kansas City 2–0 with goals by Nate Jaqua in the 34th minute and Dwayne De Rosario in the 81st minute.

=== Summary of results ===
Note: In all results below, the score of the finalist is given first (H: home; A: away).

New England Revolution				Round	Houston Dynamo			
2nd place in Eastern Conference: Pos. / Team / Pld / W / L / D / Pts; 1 / D.C. United (SS) / 30 / 16 / 7 / 7 / 55; 2 / New England Revolution / 30 / 14 / 8 / 8 / 50; 3 / New York Red Bulls / 30 / 12 / 11 / 7 / 43; 4 / Chicago Fire / 30 / 10 / 10 / 10 / 40; 5 / Kansas City Wizards / 30 / 11 / 12 / 7 / 40; Source: MLS Qualified for playoffs Supporters' Shield winner				Regular season	2nd place in Western Conference: Pos. / Team / Pld / W / L / D / Pts; 1 / Chivas USA / 30 / 15 / 7 / 8 / 53; 2 / Houston Dynamo / 30 / 15 / 8 / 7 / 52; 3 / FC Dallas / 30 / 13 / 12 / 5 / 44; 4 / Colorado Rapids / 30 / 9 / 13 / 8 / 35; 5 / Los Angeles Galaxy / 30 / 9 / 14 / 7 / 34; Source: MLS Qualified for playoffs			
Opponent	Agg.	1st leg	2nd leg	MLS Cup Playoffs	Opponent	Agg.	1st leg	2nd leg
New York Red Bulls	1–0	0–0 (A)	1–0 (H)	Conference Semifinals	FC Dallas	4–2	0–1 (A)	4–1 (a.e.t.) (H)
Chicago Fire	1–0 (H)			Conference Final	Kansas City Wizards	2–0 (H)		

== Broadcasting ==
The MLS Cup final was televised in the United States on ABC in English and TeleFutura in Spanish for the first time. English play-by-play commentary was provided by Boston-based sportscaster Dave O'Brien, reprising his role from the 2006 broadcast, and color analysis by Eric Wynalda and Julie Foudy. The match was also broadcast on local radio stations in New England and the Houston area. The match was broadcast nationally for the first time in Canada, where it was carried by CBC Country Canada using the commentary feed from ABC.

The U.S. national anthem was performed by Plácido Domingo of the Washington National Opera prior to the match. Arizona-based rock band Jimmy Eat World performed their single "Big Casino" during the match's halftime show.

== Match ==
=== Summary ===
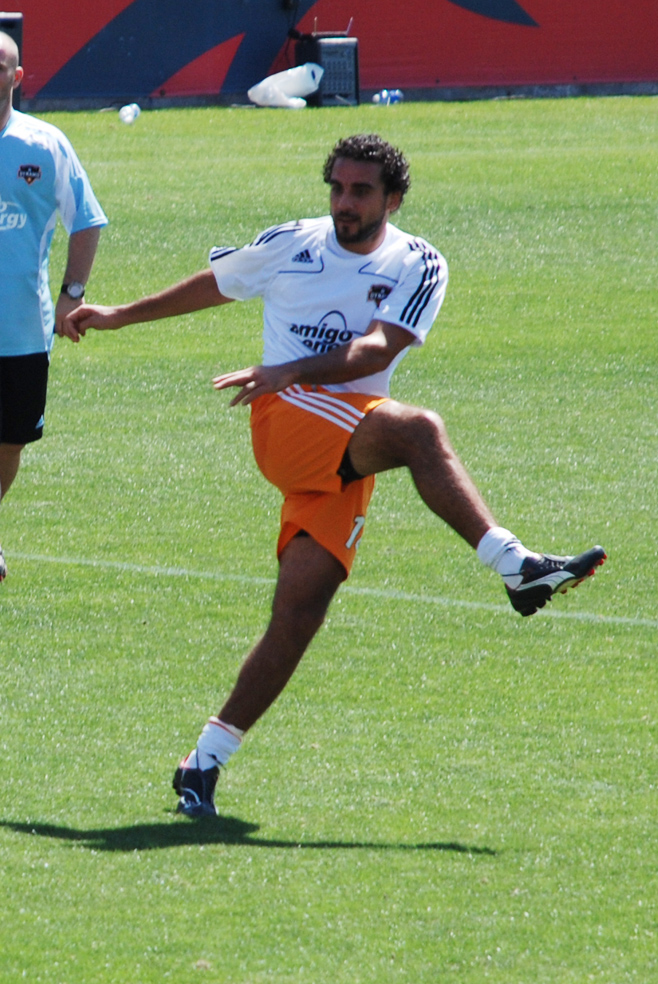
Dwayne De Rosario scored the winning goal for Houston and was named MLS Cup MVP.

The match was played in front of 39,859 spectators at RFK Memorial Stadium, including a large contingent of traveling New England and Houston supporters alongside the home D.C. United fans. The Revolution organized several free buses for fans traveling between Foxborough, Massachusetts, and RFK Memorial Stadium, and also organized a free viewing party at Gillette Stadium.

The Dynamo were without injured striker Brian Ching, who was replaced by the pairing of Nate Jaqua and Joseph Ngwenya, and suspended midfielder Ricardo Clark; the Revolution fielded a full-strength lineup that was similar to those used in their other playoff matches. Alex Prus was named the referee for the MLS Cup final, reprising his role from the 2007 U.S. Open Cup final, which also featured the Revolution.

Houston took several of the early chances to score, but New England were the first to score. A few minutes after a tackle in the Revolution box by Avery John was waved off as a potential penalty, the team made a series of passes on a counterattack towards Steve Ralston at the top of the penalty box. Ralston crossed to the far post, where the ball found Taylor Twellman, who headed in the opening goal in the 20th minute. The Revolution continued to control possession in the midfield and created additional chances to extend their lead, but failed to capitalize on them.

At halftime, Dynamo coach Dominic Kinnear switched his team from a 4–4–2 to an attack-oriented 3–5–2 formation to encourage scoring chances. Before the new formation was allowed to set in, Revolution forward Pat Noonan had a close-range shot in the first minute of the second half that was saved by Pat Onstad. After another shot from Noonan that missed the target, the Dynamo pushed ahead for an equalizing goal and won a corner kick in the 61st minute. The corner was taken by Brad Davis and cleared away by New England's defense, but fell to Brian Mullan, whose far-post cross found Dwayne De Rosario. De Rosario sent the ball back across the goal to Joseph Ngwenya, who misplayed his first touch but used his right foot to make a shot that passed under goalkeeper Matt Reis and into the net.

With the score tied at 1–1, New England attempted to strike back, but an attempt by Khano Smith was tackled away by Craig Waibel for a goal kick. After exchanging words with Waibel, Smith attempted to headbutt the Houston defender in front of referee Alex Prus, who issued a yellow card. Kinnear had planned to switch back to a defensive 4–4–2 formation after the equalizing goal, but kept Houston in the existing 3–5–2 formation at the behest of the players, who communicated using hand signals. The Revolution kept a majority of possession, but only produced a single shot to challenge Onstad before the Dynamo had taken a 2–1 lead on a counterattack. In the 74th minute, Brad Davis sent a lateral cross to Dwayne De Rosario, who headed the ball from 13 yards (12 m) and scored Houston's second goal. New England brought more of their players into a series of attacks while looking for an equalizing goal, with chances by Pat Noonan in the 77th and 82nd minutes that missed the target. Ralston was substituted for Andy Dorman in the 78th minute, who served a corner kick in the 87th minute that was headed towards goal by Jeff Larentowicz. Larentowicz's point-blank header was saved by Pat Onstad with a kick to preserve the lead and win the Houston Dynamo a second consecutive MLS Cup title.

=== Details ===
November 18, 2007
12:00 EST

New England Revolution	1–2	Houston Dynamo
Twellman 20'	Report	Ngwenya 61'; De Rosario 74'

Robert F. Kennedy Memorial Stadium, Washington, D.C.
Attendance: 39,859
Referee: Alex Prus

New England Revolution	Houston Dynamo

GK	1	(United States) Matt Reis
DF	4	(Trinidad and Tobago) Avery John
DF	6	(United States) Jay Heaps
DF	15	(United States) Michael Parkhurst
MF	13	(United States) Jeff Larentowicz
MF	14	(United States) Steve Ralston (c)	(substituted off) 78'
MF	18	(Bermuda) Khano Smith	(yellow card) 65'
MF	21	(Grenada) Shalrie Joseph
MF	27	(United States) Wells Thompson
FW	11	(United States) Pat Noonan
FW	20	(United States) Taylor Twellman
Substitutes:
GK	12	(United States) Doug Warren
DF	16	(United States) James Riley
MF	22	(United States) Marshall Leonard
MF	25	(Wales) Andy Dorman	(substituted on) 78'
MF	29	(The Gambia) Kenny Mansally
MF	31	(The Gambia) Sainey Nyassi
FW	7	(United States) Adam Cristman
Manager:
(Scotland) Steve Nicol MLS Cup MVP: (Canada) Dwayne De Rosario (Houston Dynamo) Assistant referees: Adam Wienckowski; Rob Fereday; Fourth official: Brian Hall

GK	18	(Canada) Pat Onstad
DF	2	(United States) Eddie Robinson
DF	5	(United States) Ryan Cochrane
DF	16	(United States) Craig Waibel
DF	24	(United States) Wade Barrett (c)	(yellow card) 57'
MF	9	(United States) Brian Mullan
MF	11	(United States) Brad Davis
MF	14	(Canada) Dwayne De Rosario
MF	30	(United States) Richard Mulrooney
FW	21	(United States) Nate Jaqua
FW	33	(Zimbabwe) Joseph Ngwenya	(substituted off) 80'
Substitutes:
GK	1	(United States) Zach Wells
DF	4	(United States) Patrick Ianni
MF	7	(United States) Chris Wondolowski
MF	17	(United States) Mike Chabala
MF	22	(United States) Stuart Holden	(substituted on) 80'
MF	26	(United States) Corey Ashe
FW	8	(Scotland) Paul Dalglish
Manager:
(United States) Dominic Kinnear

== Post-match ==
The Houston Dynamo became the second team to win consecutive MLS Cups, a decade after D.C. United won the first two editions in 1996 and 1997—the latter also hosted at RFK Memorial Stadium. This feat would not be repeated until 2011 and 2012 by the Los Angeles Galaxy, who won against the Dynamo. The third MLS Cup to feature a repeat match-up of finalists was in 2017, which saw Toronto FC winning against defending champion Seattle Sounders FC. New England's third consecutive and fourth overall loss at the MLS Cup final moved it ahead of the Galaxy for the all-time record as runners-up in the competition. Dwayne De Rosario became the first player to win the MLS Cup MVP award twice, having also been named MVP in 2001 with the Earthquakes, and also became the third player to win four MLS Cups. The match also featured the lowest number of substitutes in MLS Cup history, at only one per team. Revolution midfielder Steve Ralston played in his 371st MLS match, setting a new U.S. record for matches played in the country's top-flight league by surpassing a record set in the 1930s by Bill McPherson.

Houston qualified alongside Supporters' Shield winners D.C. United for the 2008 CONCACAF Champions' Cup, and won 3–1 in the quarterfinals to advance past CSD Municipal of Guatemala. In the semifinals, the Dynamo fell 3–0 in the second leg to Costa Rica's Deportivo Saprissa and were eliminated. Both MLS Cup finalists also qualified for the 2008–09 CONCACAF Champions League, the first edition of the new continental competition that replaced the Champions' Cup, alongside D.C. United and Chivas USA, the second-place team in the 2007 regular season. The Revolution were eliminated in the preliminary round by Trinidadian club Joe Public F.C., who defeated them by an aggregate score of 6–1 over two legs, including a 4–0 loss at home. The Dynamo were seeded directly into the group stage and finished in second behind Pumas UNAM, drawing 4–4 at their stadium in Mexico City, and qualified for the knockout stage ahead of C.D. Luis Ángel Firpo from El Salvador. In the quarterfinals, Houston faced Atlante, another Mexican team, and lost 4–1 on aggregate after conceding three goals in the away leg.

Houston would meet New England again in the 2008 SuperLiga Final, hosted by New England at Gillette Stadium, after qualifying based on their regular season standings. The finalists drew 2–2 after extra time to force a penalty shootout that was won 6–5 by the Revolution after eight rounds. Both teams qualified for the 2008 MLS Cup Playoffs, but failed to advance beyond the Conference Semifinals. The Revolution qualified for their fifth MLS Cup final in 2014, which it lost to the Galaxy.
