= List of New England Revolution managers =

List of managers of the New England Revolution

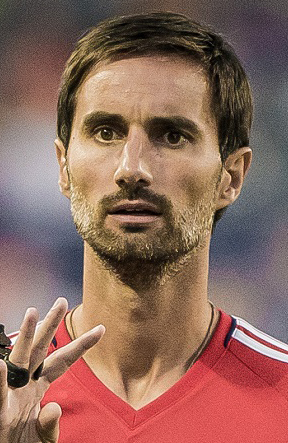
Current Revolution manager Marko Mitrović

The New England Revolution is a soccer team based in Foxborough, Massachusetts, that competes in Major League Soccer (MLS), the first-division league in the United States. The club began play in 1996 as one of ten original MLS teams. The Revolution have had ten permanent managers, with five interim managers (not including those who later served full-time as the manager).

The longest-serving manager is Steve Nicol, who was in charge for 330 league and playoff matches over two stints, with the longest being a ten-season run from May 2002 to October 2011. He is the most successful Revolution manager in terms of honors won, having led the team to a US Open Cup win in 2007 and a SuperLiga win in 2008; during his tenure the Revolution also made four unsuccessful trips to the MLS Cup final. The shortest-serving permanent manager (excluding the current one) is Frank Stapleton, who stepped down after the club's inaugural season. The current manager is Marko Mitrović, who took over the club after the 2025 season.

== Managerial history ==
=== Early managers struggle to find success (1996–2002) ===
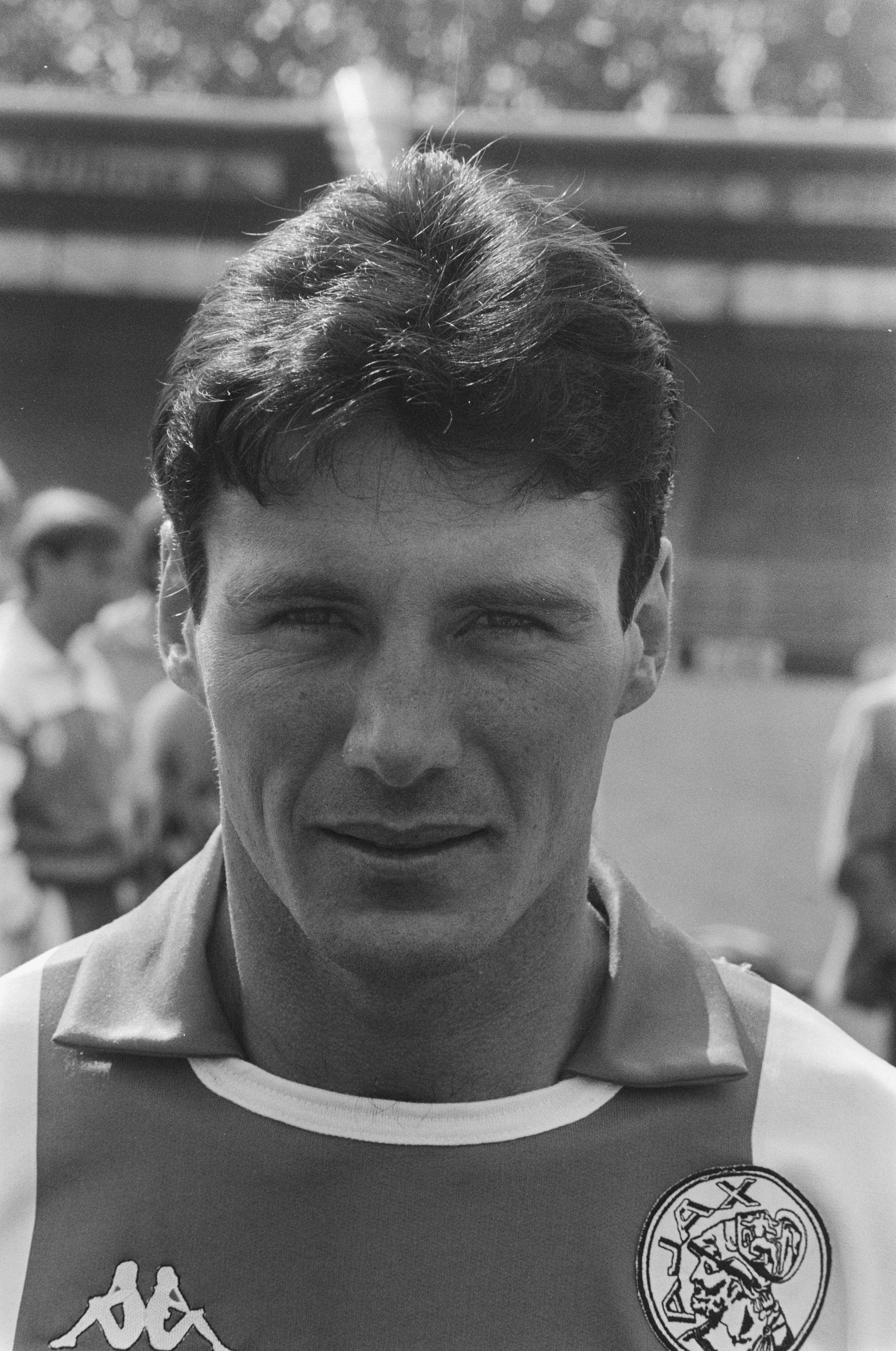
Frank Stapleton (pictured in 1987) was the first manager of the Revolution.

The New England Revolution announced former Arsenal and Manchester United player Frank Stapleton as their first manager on January 4, 1996. They were the last team in MLS to announce a manager. His tenure was marked by clashes with high-profile players Giuseppe Galderisi and Alexi Lalas, and he resigned after the team missed the playoffs in its inaugural season. In the off-season, the Revolution signed Thomas Rongen, who had won the inaugural regular-season title as the manager of the Tampa Bay Mutiny. Under Rongen, the Revolution reached the MLS playoffs, losing to D.C. United in the first two games of a three-game series. Rongen was fired in August 1998 with the team in last place and was replaced by former Revolution goalkeeper Walter Zenga. Two months later, Zenga was announced as a player-manager. The team secured its worst record to date in the 1999 season, and he was let go despite him being one of the better players on the team and there being two games left in the season. Steve Nicol, a former Liverpool player, was named as the interim manager.

Before the 2000 season, former U.S. national team player Fernando Clavijo was appointed as a manager, and the team underwent a rebuild. That season, Clavijo led the team to their first season with a winning record and their first playoff victory, which was against the Chicago Fire. The next season, the club reached the 2001 U.S. Open Cup final, which they lost 2–1 after sudden death extra time to the LA Galaxy. Clavijo was fired midway through the 2002 season with the Revolution at a 2–4–1 record, and the club elevated Steve Nicol from assistant coach to manager.

=== First trophies under Steve Nicol (2002–2011) ===
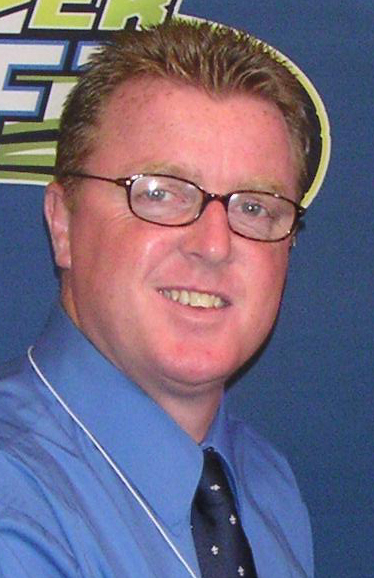
Steve Nicol is the club's longest-serving manager to date.

After being named interim manager in May 2002, Nicol led the team to the 2002 MLS Cup final, where the Revolution lost 1–0 in overtime. He was named MLS Coach of the Year, and secured the permanent manager job despite his limited experience. In 2005, Nicol again led the Revolution to the MLS Cup, and the team earned the same result: a 1–0 loss to the Galaxy in overtime. The next year, the team became the first to lose two consecutive MLS Cup finals when they lost 4–3 in a penalty shootout to the Houston Dynamo. The 2007 season would bring a first as Nicol led the Revolution to a trophy: the 2007 U.S. Open Cup final, in which the team defeated FC Dallas 3–2. However, the season would again end in disappointment, with a 2–1 loss to the Dynamo in the MLS Cup final.

The Revolution reached two more finals under Nicol: the 2008 SuperLiga final, which they won 6–5 in a penalty shootout over the Dynamo, and the 2010 SuperLiga final, which they lost 2–1 to Atlético Morelia. During Nicol's last two seasons in charge, 2010 and 2011, the team missed the playoffs. On October 24, 2011, the club announced via a press release that they "mutually decided to part ways" with Nicol, ending a ten-season run with the team that included eight consecutive playoff appearances.

=== Heaps and Friedel eras (2011–2019) ===
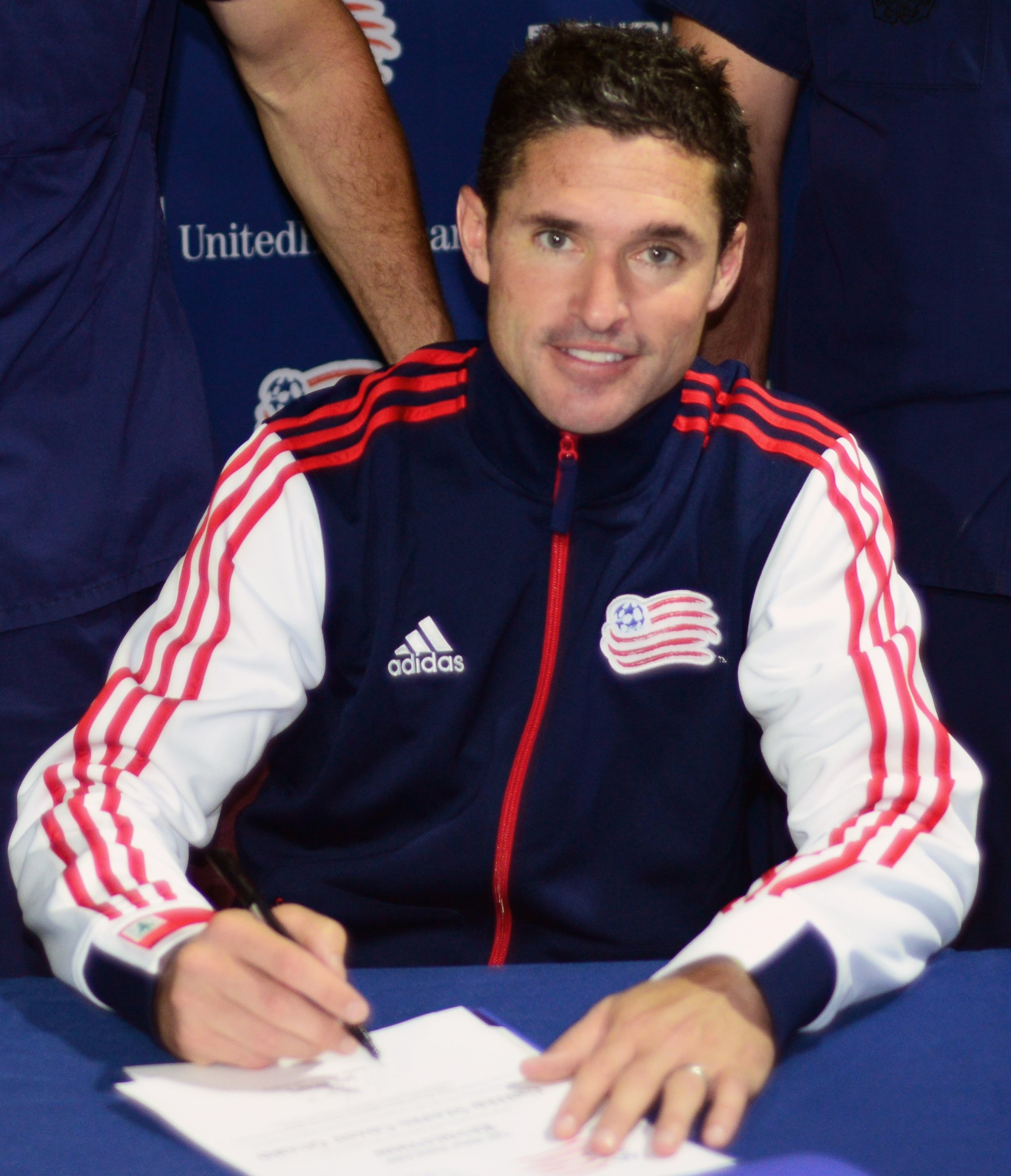
Former Revolution player Jay Heaps was appointed as manager after the club parted ways with Steve Nicol.

On November 16, 2011, the Revolution announced that former player Jay Heaps would become the sixth permanent manager. Heaps had appeared in all four MLS Cup losses as a Revolution player. Under Heaps, the team reached the 2014 MLS Cup final, where they lost 2–1 to the Galaxy, marking their fifth MLS Cup final loss in the same number of appearances. In Heaps' tenure, the team reached the playoffs from 2013 to 2015, although he was ultimately fired in September 2017 following a poor stretch which included a 7–0 loss to Atlanta United.

Former U.S. Men's national team goalkeeper Brad Friedel was appointed as manager on November 9, 2017. Friedel was fired in May 2018, with a 2–8–2 record in the 2018 season. His last game in charge was a 5–0 defeat to the Chicago Fire.

=== Bruce Arena era and aftermath (2019–present) ===
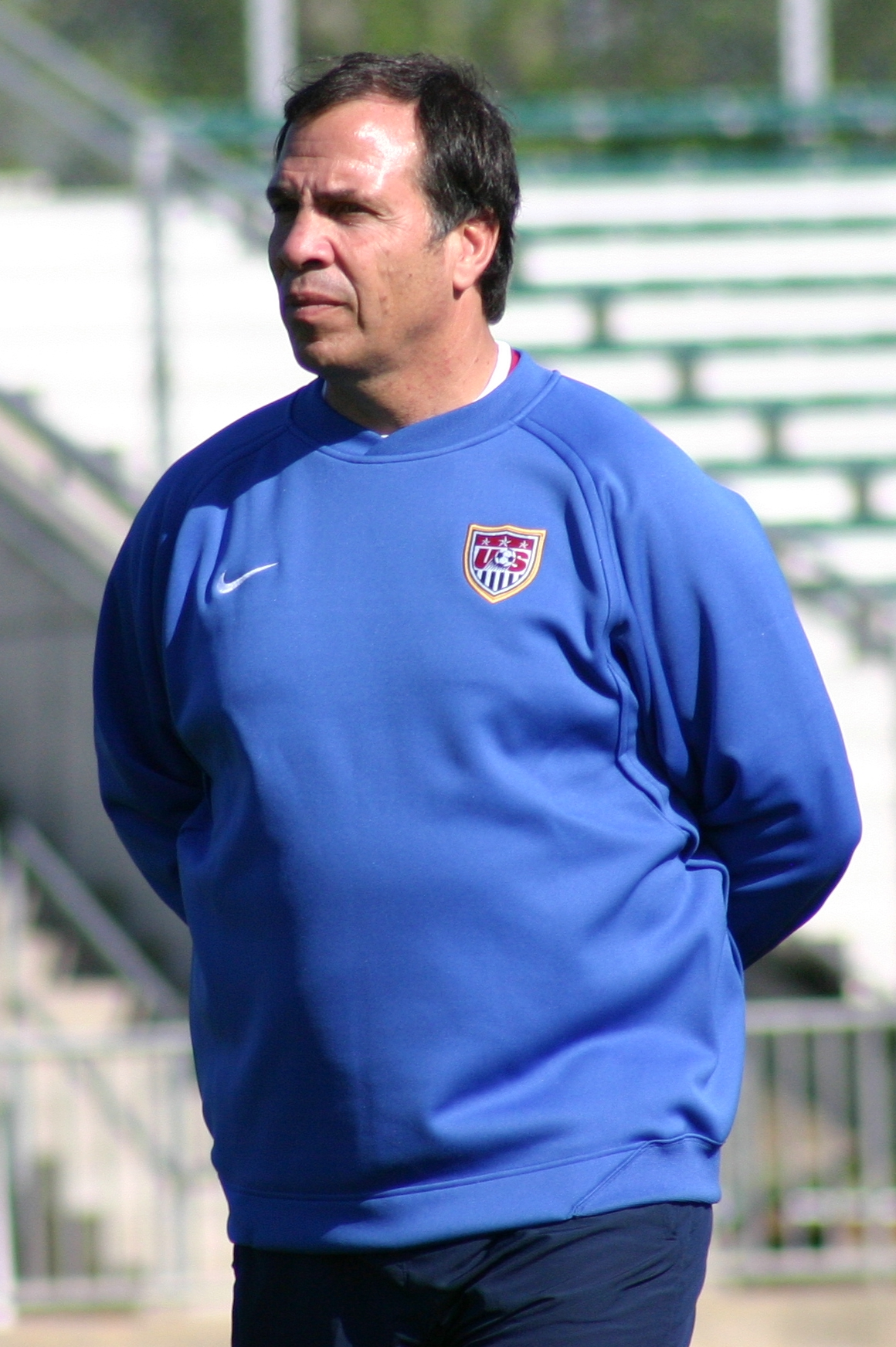
Bruce Arena (pictured in 2006) served as manager and sporting director from 2019 until resignation in 2024.

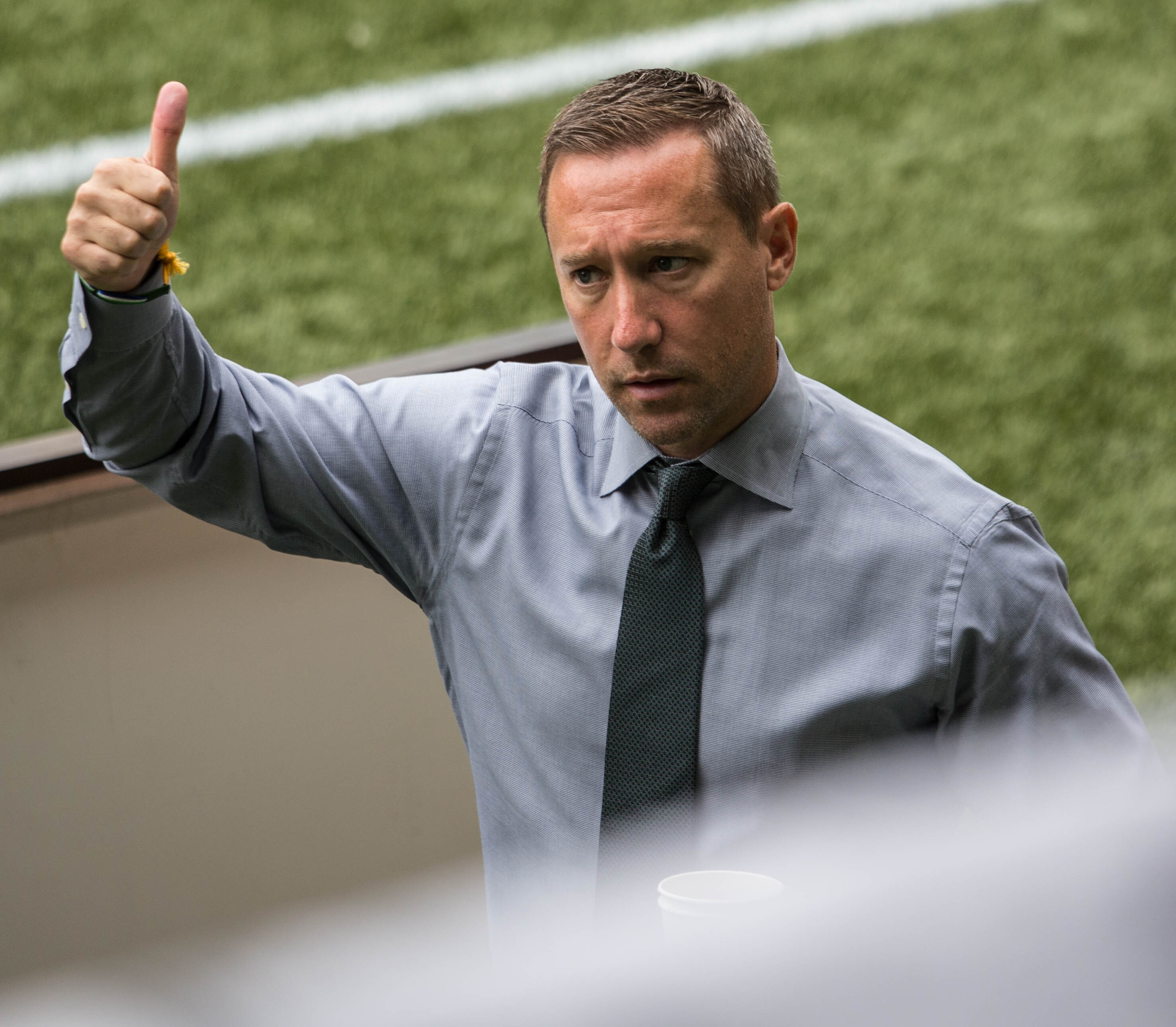
Caleb Porter led the Revolution between 2024 and 2025.

On May 14, 2019, the club announced Bruce Arena as the manager and sporting director. Arena held the record for the most wins as a U.S. national team manager, as well as five MLS Cups. Under Arena's stewardship in 2021, the club won the Supporters' Shield, and set the record for the most points in a single season with 73 points in the 2021 season, although they were knocked out of the playoffs in the first round by New York City F.C. The next season, the team missed the playoffs for the first time in Arena's tenure.

On August 1, 2023, the club suspended Arena from his roles as manager and sporting director pending an MLS investigation into his alleged use of "insensitive and inappropriate language". He resigned on September 9, saying in a statement: "I know that I have made some mistakes and moving forward, I plan to spend some time reflecting on this situation and taking corrective steps to address what has transpired." Richie Williams, who had been serving as the interim manager during Arena's suspension, was removed from his role three days later, after Revolution players reportedly refused to train. Additionally, assistant coaches Shalrie Joseph and Dave van den Bergh, who had both voiced their support for Arena on social media, parted ways with the club that same day. New England Revolution II manager Clint Peay was announced as the new interim manager. The team qualified for the 2023 MLS Cup Playoffs, where they were eliminated by the Philadelphia Union.

The club announced two-time MLS Cup winner Caleb Porter as the next manager on December 19. His record with the team after his first season was 9–21–4, and the team finished in 14th in the Eastern Conference. The team overhauled their roster in the offseason, starting the 2025 season with only 12 players remaining from the previous season. On September 15, 2025 the Revolution fired Porter, and replaced him with assistant coach Pablo Moreira as the interim. Porter's tenure was marked by controversial comments, being fined $20,000 in 2024 for calling a referee a "complete coward", and in 2025 for calling the record-breaking 2021 Revolution team "not very good".

On November 7, 2025, the Revolution appointed former United States men's national under-20 soccer team head coach Mark Mitrović as the tenth permanent head coach of the club.

== List of managers ==
Information correct as of October 19 2024

Key

- Names of caretaker managers are highlighted in italics and marked with an asterisk (*).
- Names of player-managers are marked with a double-dagger (‡).
- Match results contain all league games as well as MLS playoff matches.

List of New England Revolution managers
Name	Nationality	From	To	Matches	Won	Lost	Drawn (Note: Before the 2000 Major League Soccer season, matches would be settled in a penalty shootout rather than end in a draw.)	Win%	Honors
Frank Stapleton	Ireland	January 4, 1996	September 26, 1996	32	15	17	0	46.88	
Thomas Rongen	Netherlands	November 5, 1996	August 24, 1998	60	23	37	0	38.33	
Walter Zenga ‡	Italy	August 24, 1998 (Note: On August 24, 1998, Zenga was appointed as interim manager. On October 28, he was announced as a player-manager.)	September 20, 1999	36	13	23	0	36.11	
Steve Nicol *	Scotland	September 20, 1999	November 29, 1999	2	2	0	0	100.00	
Fernando Clavijo	United States	November 29, 1999	May 24, 2002	69	23	33	13	33.33	U.S. Open Cup runners-up: 2001
Steve Nicol	Scotland	May 24, 2002 (Note: Nicol served as interim manager until the end of the 2002 season, and was signed as a permanent manager after leading the team to the 2002 MLS Cup final.)	October 24, 2011	328	122	117	89	37.20	MLS Cup runners-up: 2002, 2005, 2006, 2007; U.S. Open Cup winners: 2007; SuperLiga winners: 2008 runners-up: 2010
Jay Heaps	United States	November 16, 2011	September 19, 2017	207	79	84	44	38.16	MLS Cup runners-up: 2014
Tom Soehn *	United States	September 19, 2017	November 9, 2017	5	3	1	1	60.00	
Brad Friedel	United States	November 9, 2017	May 9, 2019	46	12	21	13	26.09	
Mike Lapper *	United States	May 9, 2019	May 14, 2019	3	1	0	2	33.33	
Bruce Arena	United States	May 14, 2019	September 9, 2023 (Note: Arena was placed on administrative leave starting August 1, 2023, with Richie Williams serving as interim in that time. On September 9, Arena resigned.)	139	63	33	43	45.32	Supporters' Shield winners: 2021
Richie Williams *	United States	August 1, 2023	September 12, 2023	4	1	1	2	25.00	
Clint Peay *	United States	September 12, 2023	December 19, 2023	9	2	6	1	22.22	
Caleb Porter	United States	December 19, 2023	September 15, 2025	64	17	35	12	26.56	
Pablo Moreira *	United States	September 15, 2025	November 7, 2025	4	1	2	1	25.00	
Marko Mitrović	Serbia	November 7, 2025	Present	0	0	0	0	—	

== See also ==
- List of Major League Soccer head coaches
