= 2008 North American SuperLiga final =

Soccer match

- Event: 2008 North American SuperLiga
New England Revolution	Houston Dynamo
MLS	MLS
2	2
- After extra time New England won 6–5 in a penalty shootout
- Date: August 6, 2008
- Venue: Gillette Stadium, Foxborough, Massachusetts, U.S.
- Referee: Howard Webb (England)
- Attendance: 9,232
- Weather: Partly cloudy, 71 °F

The 2008 North American SuperLiga final was a soccer match played on August 6, 2008, at Gillette Stadium in Foxborough, Massachusetts in the United States. The match determined the winner of the 2008 North American SuperLiga, the second edition of the North American SuperLiga, which was a tournament contested by teams from Major League Soccer and Liga MX. In the 2008 edition, the top four teams from each league qualified based on their point totals at the end of the previous season. The New England Revolution defeated the Houston Dynamo in the match, which was a rematch of the 2006 and 2007 MLS Cup finals, which were both won by the Dynamo. The final took place in front of 9,232 supporters and was refereed by Howard Webb from England.

The teams started in different groups, and each faced opposition from Liga MX in the semifinals, with Houston dispatching Pachuca CF and the Revolution defeating Atlante F.C. in a match that saw five players sent off. Before the final, both sets of players agreed to split the prize money equally, believing that the share of the prize money awarded to the winning team's players was too low relative to the tournament's overall $1 million prize.

The Revolution defeated Houston 6–5 in a penalty shootout after drawing the match 2–2. Houston scored the first goal as Nate Jaqua stole took the ball from inexperienced centerback Amaechi Igwe, and Steve Ralston brought the match level late in the first half. Houston took the lead again in extratime with a Kei Kamara header, with New England once again equalizing via a goal from Shalrie Joseph. Chris Albright scored the winning penalty in the eight-round shootout.

The win marked New England's second trophy in club history, following their win in the 2007 U.S. Open Cup final. They were the only MLS club to win the SuperLiga trophy during its four years in existence, and the 2008 final was the only one contested between two MLS clubs.

== Venue ==
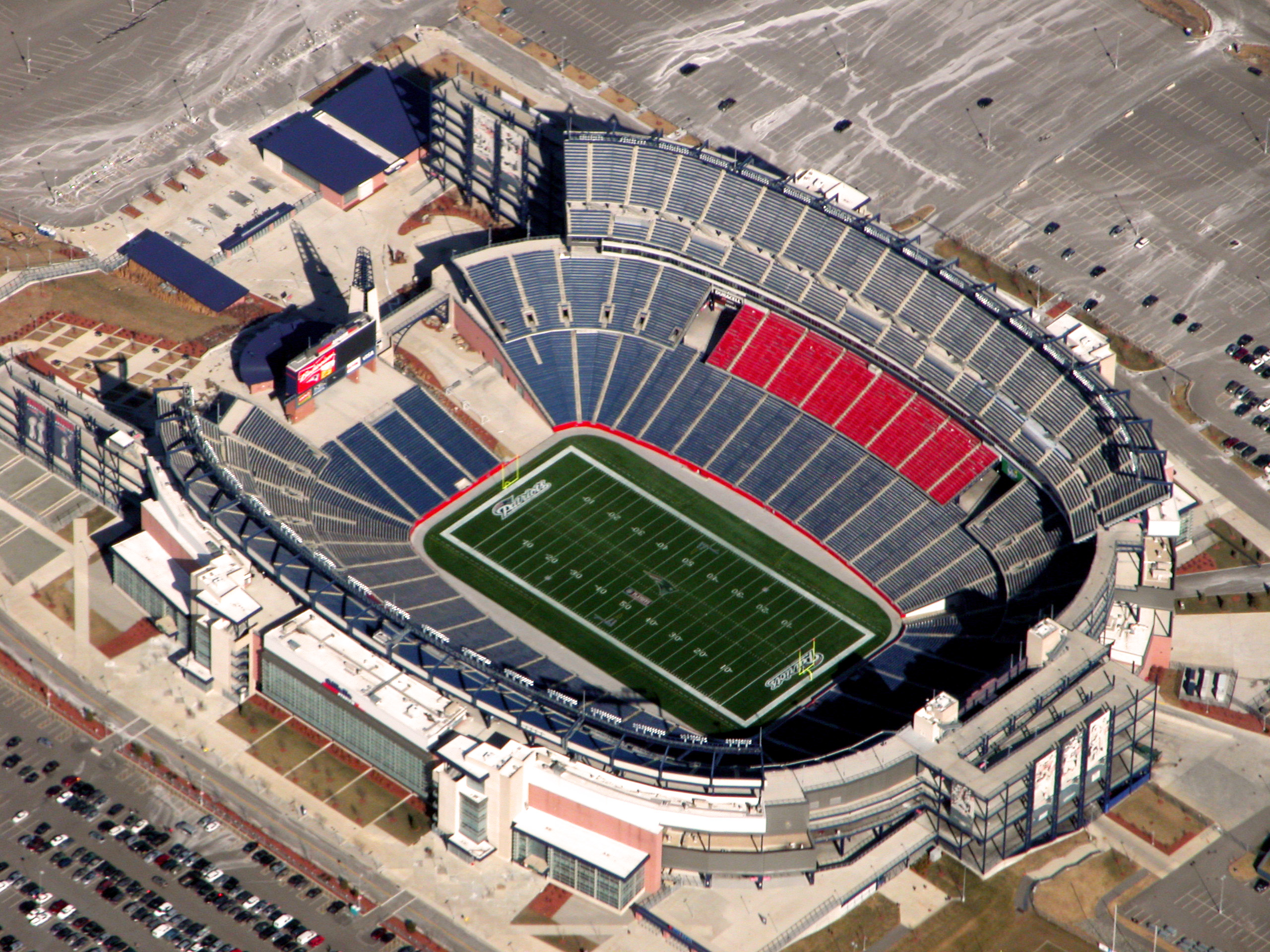
The 64,628-seat Gillette Stadium hosted four matches during the 2008 North American SuperLiga, including the final.

The final was hosted at Gillette Stadium, the home stadium of the New England Revolution since 2002. It is a multi-purpose stadium located in the town of Foxborough, Massachusetts, less than 30 miles from Boston. The stadium is also home to the New England Patriots of the National Football League, and hosts concerts and other special events. Previously, the stadium hosted the 2002 MLS Cup final, where the Revolution lost to the LA Galaxy. That match drew a crowd of 61,316, the largest MLS post-season crowd until the 2018 MLS Cup in Atlanta.

== Background ==
The North American SuperLiga was an official North American soccer competition between teams from Liga MX of Mexico and Major League Soccer from the United States and Canada. The competition served as the sub-regional championship for the North American section of CONCACAF. The tournament was first held in 2007 and canceled in March 2011. The entire 2008 tournament was broadcast live in Spanish in the United States on TeleFutura.

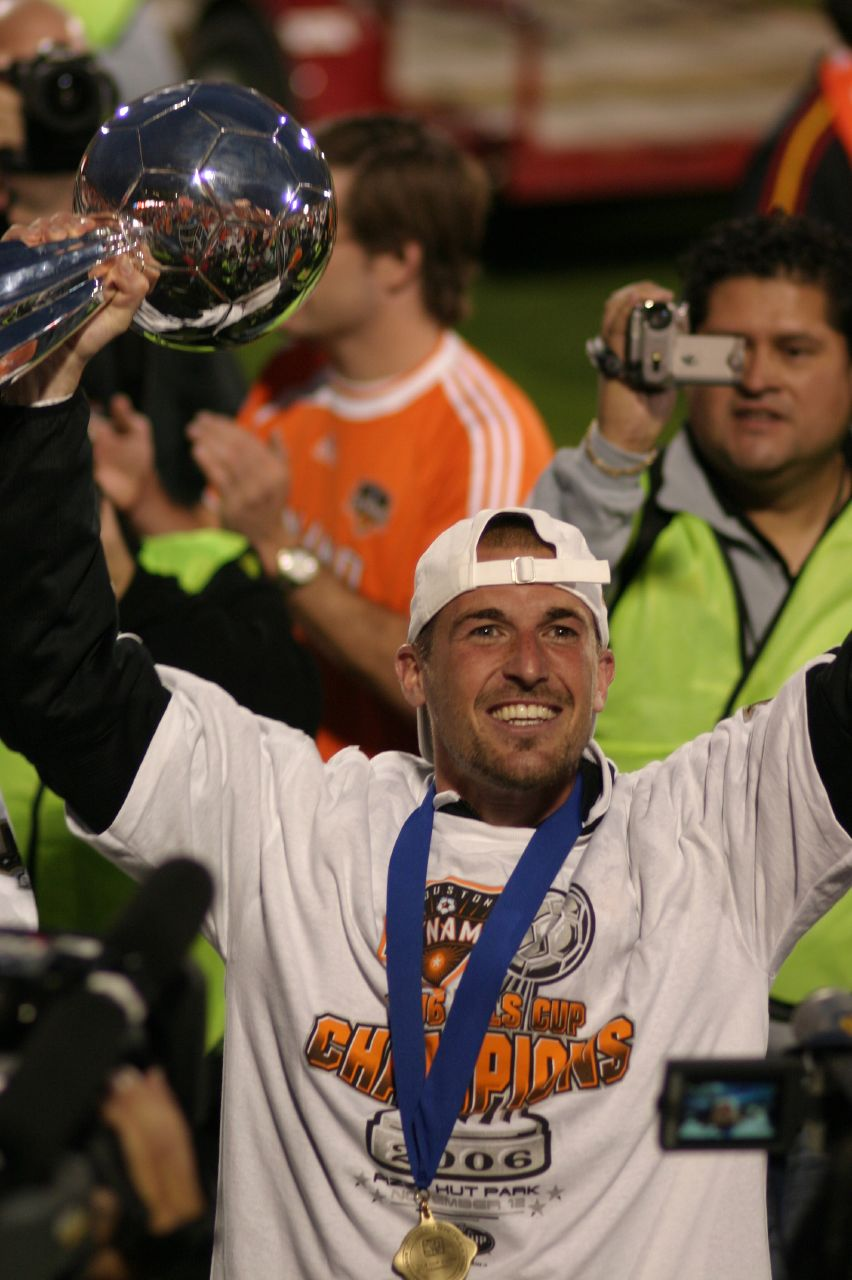
Paul Dalglish celebrates the Dynamo's 2006 MLS Cup win over the Revolution

The New England Revolution are one of ten original MLS teams, beginning play in 1996. They were not invited to participate in the inaugural SuperLiga. The team had competed in the 2003 and 2005 CONCACAF Champions' Cup, both times losing to Alajuelense on aggregate. The 2008 SuperLiga was the first time that the Revolution had home matches in an international competition, as they chose to play their "home" matches in the Champions' Cup in Bermuda and Costa Rica to avoid potential cold weather in the Boston area. The Revolution had never won the MLS Cup, although they had reached the final on four separate occasions. Additionally, the Revolution had played in two US Open Cup finals, winning their first-ever trophy in their 2007 win over FC Dallas.

The Houston Dynamo began MLS play in 2006 after the San Jose Earthquakes relocated. In their first two seasons, they defeated the Revolution in MLS Cup 2006 and MLS Cup 2007. The Dynamo were one of four MLS clubs invited to participate in the 2007 edition of the SuperLiga, where they lost in the semifinals to Pachuca. Their SuperLiga semifinal was a rematch of their semifinal against Pachuca in the 2007 CONCACAF Champions' Cup, where Pachuca won 5–4 on aggregate.

Both the Houston Dynamo and the New England Revolution qualified for the 2008 tournament based on their performance in the 2007 MLS season; the Dynamo qualified as the winner of the 2007 MLS Cup, and the Revolution qualified as the runners-up. The SuperLiga final would be the third final between these two teams. Going into the tournament, the Revolution were leading the MLS standings table with 33 pts and a 10-4-3 record, while the Dynamo were mid-table in the Western Conference with 20 points and a 4-4-8 record.

== Route to the final ==
(United States) New England Revolution			Round	(United States) Houston Dynamo		
Opponent	Venue	Score		Opponent	Venue	Score
Group B			Group stage	Group A		
(Mexico) Santos Laguna	Home	1–0	Group stage	(Mexico) Atlante	Home	4–0
(Mexico) Pachuca	Home	1–0	Group stage	(Mexico) Guadalajara	Home	0–1
(United States) Chivas USA	Away	1–1	Group stage	(United States) D.C. United	Away	1–3
Pos / Team / Pld / Pts; 1 / (United States) New England Revolution / 3 / 7; 2 / (Mexico) Pachuca / 3 / 4; 3 / (United States) Chivas USA / 3 / 4; 4 / (Mexico) Santos Laguna / 3 / 1; Source: Livesport			Group stage	Pos / Team / Pld / Pts; 1 / (United States) Houston Dynamo / 3 / 6; 2 / (Mexico) Atlante / 3 / 6; 3 / (Mexico) Guadalajara / 3 / 6; 4 / (United States) D.C. United / 3 / 0; Source: Livesport		
(Mexico) Atlante	Home	1–0	Semifinals	(Mexico) Pachuca	Home	2–0

=== New England Revolution ===
The Revolution opened their SuperLiga campaign with a 1–0 victory over Santos Laguna on July 13, 2008, at Gillette Stadium. Santos Laguna had won the 2008 Clausura, the most recent championship in Mexico. The Revolution were without Taylor Twellman and Mauricio Castro due to injury. At the start of the match, the Revolution began in a 4-4-2 formation, but would shift to a 3-5-2 in the second half. In the first half, Santos Laguna were reduced to 10 men after Juan Pablo Rodríguez was shown red for an elbow to the head of the Revolution's Sainey Nyassi. In the 70th minute, Kheli Dube scored the match's only goal to give the Revolution their first competitive victory against a foreign opponent at Gillette Stadium. This win extended their unbeaten streak to five matches across all competitions.

Their second outing in the SuperLiga was against Pachuca on July 16, and was again hosted at Gillette Stadium. The two teams had never met before. Pachuca were a five-time Mexican champion, and had won back-to-back CONCACAF Champions Cups. This time, the Revolution were missing Twellman, Castro, Steve Ralston, Jeff Larentowicz, Chris Albright, Gary Flood, and Adam Cristman, all due to injury. Four Revolution players (Dube, Jay Heaps, Pat Phelan, and Michael Parkhurst) were in danger of suspension if they received a caution in this match because they had received one in their last match against Santos Laguna. Pachuca was without Bruno Marioni for the match. Midfielder Pat Phelan for the Revolution had to be taken off on a stretcher after an injury. Phelan had collided with Sainey Nyassi and was knocked unconscious. He regained consciousness but was brought to Massachusetts General Hospital for general treatment. The score remained level until the eighth minute of stoppage time, when Pachucha's Julio Manzur was called for a handling offense that blocked a shot from Nyassi. Khano Smith stepped up to take his first ever penalty for the Revolution, and converted it to take a 1–0 lead. The result held, leaving the Revolution atop the group with six points.

Their final group stage game was on July 20, against Chivas USA at Titan Stadium in Fullerton, California. The game was played at Titan Stadium rather than the Home Depot Center because the latter was being renovated for the Summer X-games. The Revolution's flight to the match, American Airlines Flight 725, had to be diverted to Oklahoma City after a fellow passenger stripped naked and attempted to open the emergency exit. For the match, Chivas USA were without Paulo Nagamura due to yellow-card accumulation, as well as without head coach Preki, who was tending to a family emergency. It took until the second half for either team to break through, when Chivas's Ante Razov scored on a rebound. This was the sixth consecutive game in which Razov scored. Shalrie Joseph of the Revolution then scored an equalizer, and the game finished 1–1. With this result, the Revolution finished as group winners, and secured a spot in the semifinals. Additionally, the result guaranteed that they would host their semifinal match, as well as a potential final match should they advance.

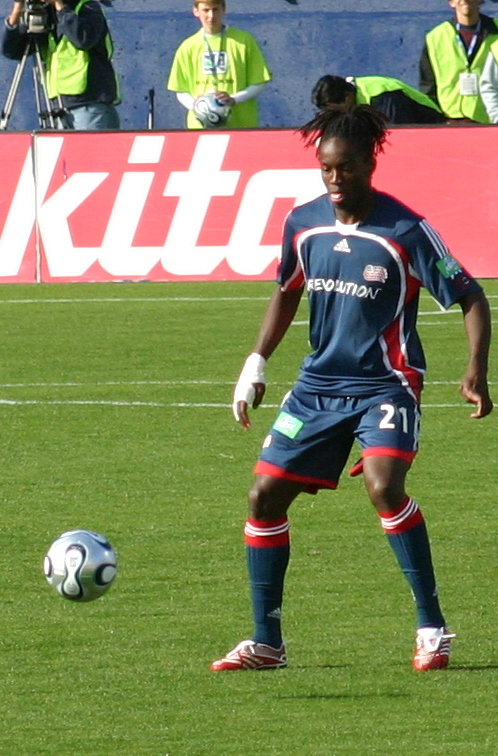
Shalrie Joseph earned Player of the Match against Atlante in the semifinals

In the semifinals, the Revolution returned to Gillette Stadium to face off against Atlante on July 30. This was the first time the Revolution had reached the semifinal of an international competition, and for Atlante, this was the first international competition they had played in since 1994. The two teams had met in preseason, where the Revolution lost 1–0, and three players were ejected. The Revolution were without Parkhurst, who was on Olympic duty. Atlante were outshot by the Revolution 17–8. The Revs took a 1–0 lead in the 30th minute from a Joseph header, which would be enough to carry them to the finals. Late in the second half, Atlante forward Luis Gabriel Rey was shown red for striking Joseph in the stomach. Atlante lost another player in stoppage time, when Alan Zamora was issued another red card. After the final whistle, a mass confrontation occurred in the midfield. Federico Vilar, Javier Muñoz Mustafa, and Luis Venegas of Atlante were each show red. Additionally, Heaps was shown red for retaliation, suspending him for the final match. Shalrie Joseph was named Player of the Match for his contributions. After the game, some Revolution staff and personnel expressed disappointment with Atlante's conduct, with goalkeeper Matt Reis claiming "They have guys on their team, their staff hitting people from behind. You see it all the time, they're always swearing and yelling at the ref. All they wanted to do was come on and fight us." Going into the final, the Revolution had conceded only one goal in four games, and remained the only undefeated team in the tournament.

=== Houston Dynamo ===
The Dynamo's first SuperLiga game was a 4–0 win against Atlante played on July 12 at Robertson Stadium at the University of Houston. This was a season-high goal total, and the Dynamo were dominant for the entire game. Their first three goals were scored in a nine-minute span, with Dwayne De Rosario scoring in the 20th, and Stu Holden scoring a brace with 21st and 28th-minute goals. In the 44th minute, De Rosario and Atlante's Javier Munoz Mustafa were sent off for violent conduct. In the 54th minute, Brian Mullan scored a fourth goal to seal the win for the Dynamo.

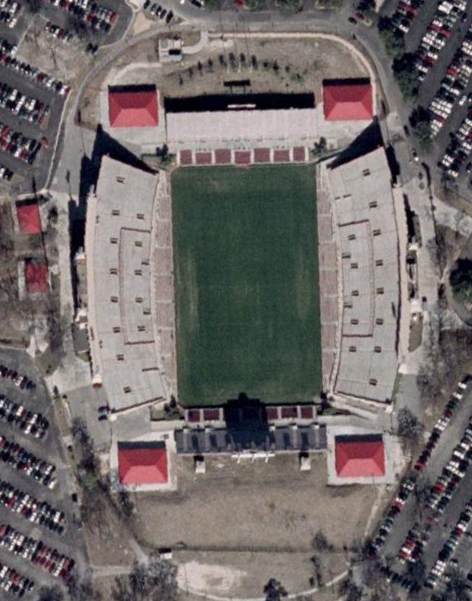
An aerial view of Robertson Stadium, which hosted three games in the 2008 SuperLiga

The Dynamo next played Chivas de Guadalajara on July 15, again at Robertson Stadium. The match was played in front of 28,723 spectators, the fourth-largest crowd ever at the venue. The Dynamo were missing Brian Ching and Holden due to injury, as well as De Rosario due to suspension. The lone goal in the contest was scored by Chivas's Omar Arellano in the 71st minute. Chivas won the match 1–0, giving them a perfect record up to that point in the competition.

The final group stage game for the Dynamo was played on July 19 against DC United. The game was played at United's stadium, RFK Stadium. The Dynamo won comfortably, with goals from Ricardo Clark and Bobby Boswell in the first 28 minutes. While United's Francis Doe scored in the 77th minute, Holden scored in the 84th minute, bringing the final score to 3–1. With the result, it was a near certainty that the Dynamo would advance to the semifinals, as they would only be eliminated if Atlante defeated Chivas by eight goals later that night.

In the semifinal matchup on July 29, the Dynamo beat defending SuperLiga champions Pachuca CF 2–0 at Robertson Stadium. The Dynamo had faced Pachuca in the previous edition of the SuperLiga, as well as in the 2007 Champions' Cup, losing both competitions in the semifinal stage. In this matchup, the Dynamo were without Richard Mulrooney and Eddie Robinson, who were injured. The first goal was scored by Boswell. Pachuca had a potential equalizer waved off for offsides in the 58th minute. The Dynamo's Corey Ashe scored on a header in the 87th minute, which secured their place in the SuperLiga final.

== Pre-match ==
=== Prize money ===
The first prize for the tournament was $1 million. Under the collective bargaining agreement, the players of that winning team would collect 15% of the total sum, or $150,000 split between a 28-man roster. The players on the runner-up team were set to split $100,000 in prize money. On the day of the final, the MLS Players Association announced that the teams would be splitting the prize money regardless of the outcome of the match, as they viewed the low prize money as a violation of the Collective Bargaining Agreement.

"The players on the Houston Dynamo and the New England Revolution have agreed in advance of the SuperLiga final that they will split evenly the bonus money at stake in the game. The players have made this decision to show their solidarity and in protest of the league's violation of the Collective Bargaining Agreement with respect to the negotiation of bonuses for this tournament."

— MLS Players Union Statement,

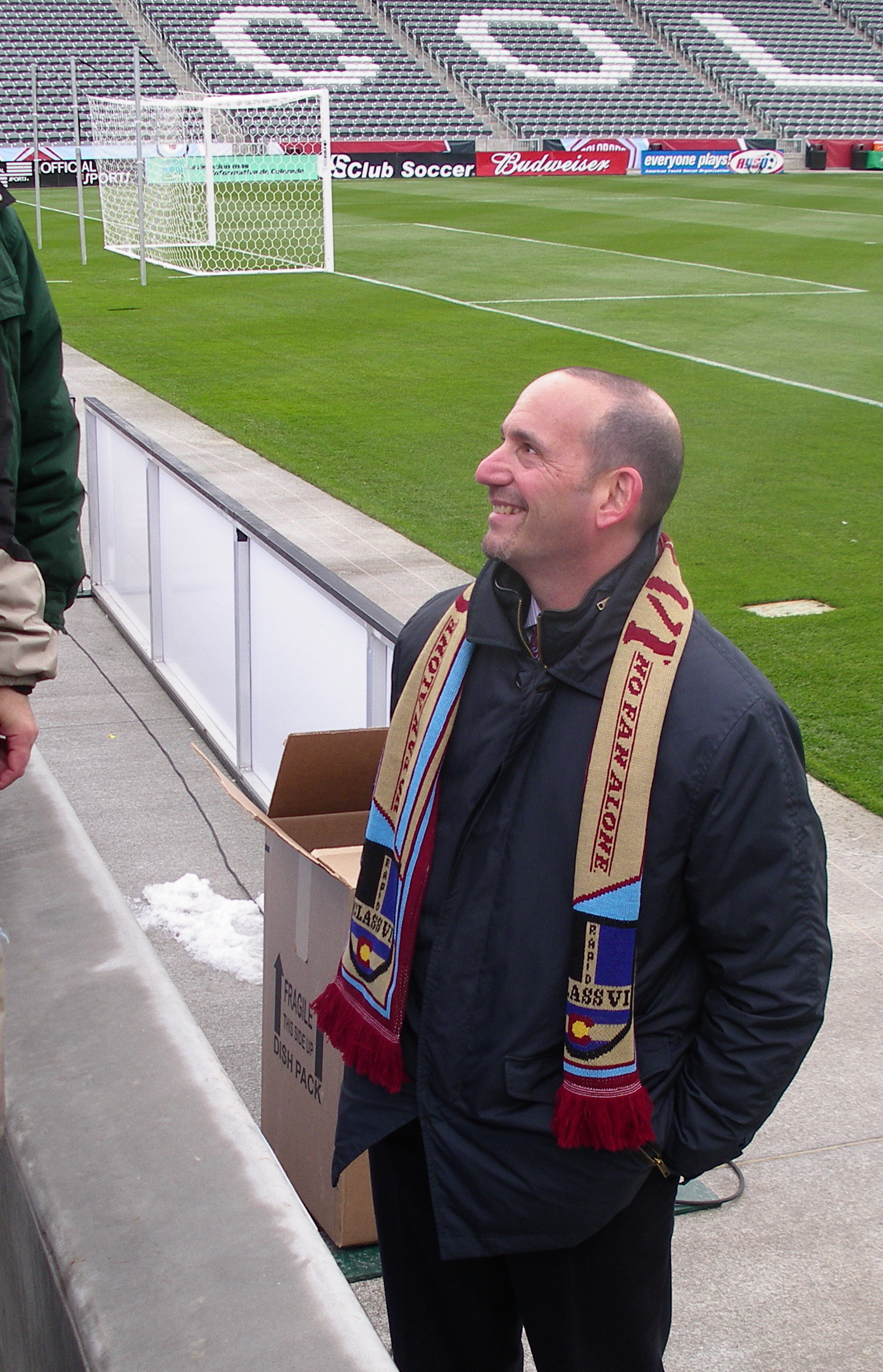
Commissioner Don Garber during the 2007 MLS season

League commissioner Don Garber rejected the players' decision to split the prize money. Garber claimed that splitting the prize money was prohibited by the CBA. The commissioner stated: "We never implied that the players were going to receive a million dollars. The winner's the team. The club gets the prize. And then we have an agreement as to what the share would be for the players."

Columnist Greg Lalas, writing for Sports Illustrated, claimed the tournament was dependent on Mexican clubs for attendance and viewership, and that the all-MLS matchup would be considered a failure by the leagues' marketing teams. In a match preview for The Guardian, writer Shaka Hislop called the league's approach to the bonus system a "blinkered view", and said that the statement from the union "was a move of true solidarity by both clubs in an effort to show MLS commissioner Don Garber that the players and the clubs also have a voice and deserve to be heard."

== Match ==
The match was played on August 6 at 8 pm at Gillette Stadium in Foxborough, Massachusetts. The weather was partly cloudy and the temperature was 71 °F. The match drew an attendance of 9,232 people. This was a 26.1% decrease in attendance from the previous year's final between Pachuca and the LA Galaxy. The Revolution were missing Jay Heaps, who was suspended after the semifinal matchup with Atlante, as well as Michael Parkhurst, who was on the US Olympic team. These players had started every group stage game as centerbacks, which led to Jeff Larentowicz and Amaechi Igwe filling in, despite both having limited experience in that position.

=== First half ===
Both sides began the match with early chances to score that were narrowly missed. The scoring opened in the eighteenth minute, when Houston player Nate Jaqua capitalized on a mistake from Igwe, who cleared the ball directly to Jaqua. After stealing the ball, Jaqua had an open shot that he finished in the bottom left of the Revolution's goal. Chris Albright said in a post-match interview: "The goal is a mistake, and Igwe would tell you that. Igwe didn't hear us calling him off the ball, but he bounced back well from it." Only a minute later, the Dynamo nearly scored a second goal, when Brian Ching fired a shot into the left post. Late in the half, Dwayne De Rosario and Jaqua came close to scoring, but their shots were cleared off the line by Albright and Chris Tierney. In the 41st minute, Steve Ralston received a cross from Mauricio Castro, and volleyed the ball into the lower left corner of the net to bring the game level.

=== Second half ===
The second half saw fewer chances for both teams. The Revolution subbed off Kenny Mansally for Taylor Twellman in the 58th minute. This was Twellman's first SuperLiga appearance, and his first appearance for the Revolution since July 4, 2008. In the 71st minute, the Revolution's Mauricio Castro was subbed off for Khano Smith, and a minute later, the Dynamo's goal-scorer Nate Jaqua was subbed off for Kei Kamara. Both teams made one further change in this half, with the Dynamo subbing Corey Ashe in for Brian Mullan in the 79th minute, and the Revolution subbing in Adam Cristman for Kheli Dube. Both the Dynamo and the Revolution failed to score in the second half, which brought the game to extratime.

=== Extra time ===
In the 98th minute, Kei Kamara scored a header off of Brian Ching's cross to bring the match to 2–1. Kamara rose above Revolution goalkeeper Matt Reis to head the ball into an open net. Four minutes later, a Ralston free kick was headed into the lower corner of Houston's net by Shalrie Joseph to bring the Revolution level again and to ensure the game was decided by a penalty shootout. In the 110th minute, Chris Wondolowski subbed on for the Dynamo, replacing Brad Davis.

=== Shootout ===
The Revolution took the first kick, with Steve Ralston scoring on his attempt. Houston's Craig Waibel equalized on his attempt. In the second round, Revolution goalkeeper Matt Reis missed his penalty kick, but then had back-to-back saves in the third and fourth rounds against Dwayne De Rosario and Brian Ching to give the Revolution the advantage. Khano Smith had a chance to win the game in the fifth round, but Houston goalkeeper Pat Onstad saved it, and Ricardo Clark scored a must-score penalty to bring the shootout to sudden death at 3-3. In the sixth and seventh round, Jeff Larentowicz and Chris Tierney scored for the Revolution, while Wade Barrett and Kei Kamara scored for the Dynamo. In the eighth round, Albright scored his penalty to give the Revs the lead. Corey Ashe's attempt hit the crossbar, which sealed a 6–5 win in the penalty shootout for the Revs.

=== Details ===
August 6, 2008
8:00 PM EDT

New England Revolution	2 – 2 (a.e.t.)	Houston Dynamo
Ralston 41'; Joseph 102'	Report	Jaqua 18'; Kamara 98'
Penalties
Ralston (penalty scored); Reis (penalty missed); Joseph (penalty scored); Twellman (penalty scored); Smith (penalty missed); Larentowicz (penalty scored); Tierney (penalty scored); Albright (penalty scored)	6–5	(penalty scored) Waibel; (penalty scored) Wondolowski; (penalty missed) De Rosario; (penalty missed) Ching; (penalty scored) Clark; (penalty scored) Barrett; (penalty scored) Kamara; (penalty missed) Ashe

Gillette Stadium, Foxborough, MA
Attendance: 9,232
Referee: Howard Webb (England)

New England Revolution	Houston Dynamo

GK	1	(United States) Matt Reis
RB	3	(United States) Chris Albright
CB	13	(United States) Jeff Larentowicz
CB	21	(Grenada) Shalrie Joseph	(yellow card) 79'
LB	2	(United States) Amaechi Igwe
RM	31	(The Gambia) Sainey Nyassi
CM	14	(United States) Steve Ralston (c)
CM	16	(Honduras) Mauricio Castro		(substituted off) 71'
LM	8	(United States) Chris Tierney
CF	29	(Zimbabwe) Kheli Dube		(substituted off) 90'
CF	9	(The Gambia) Abdoulie Mansally		(substituted off) 58'
Substitutes:
GK	12	(United States) Doug Warren
DF	22	(United States) Rob Valentino
DF	28	(United States) Pat Phelan
MF	30	(United States) Brandon Tyler
FW	7	(United States) Adam Cristman		(substituted on) 90'
FW	18	(Bermuda) Khano Smith		(substituted on) 71'
FW	20	(United States) Taylor Twellman		(substituted on) 58'
Manager:
(Scotland) Steve Nicol

GK	18	(Canada) Pat Onstad
CB	16	(United States) Craig Waibel
CB	32	(United States) Bobby Boswell
CB	20	(United States) Geoff Cameron
CM	9	(United States) Brian Mullan		(substituted off) 79'
CM	13	(United States) Ricardo Clark
CM	11	(United States) Brad Davis	(yellow card) 14'	(substituted off) 110'
RW	21	(United States) Nate Jaqua		(substituted off) 72'
AM	14	(Canada) Dwayne De Rosario
LW	24	(United States) Wade Barrett (c)
CF	25	(United States) Brian Ching
Substitutes:
GK	1	(United States) Tony Caig
DF	17	(United States) Mike Chabala
DF	26	(United States) Corey Ashe		(substituted on) 79'
MF	19	(United States) John Hayden
FW	5	(United States) Kyle Brown
FW	7	(United States) Chris Wondolowski		(substituted on) 110'
FW	10	(Sierra Leone) Kei Kamara		(substituted on) 72'
Manager:
(United States) Dominic Kinnear

Assistant referees:
Hector Vergara
Greg Barkey
Fourth official:
Jorge González

Match rules

- 90 minutes
- 30 minutes of extra time if necessary.
- Penalty shootout if scores still tied.

== Post-match ==
"To be honest, had we not [won], it would have been a complete and utter disaster."

— Steve Nicol, New England Revolution Head Coach,

The Revolution were named 2008 SuperLiga champions after their victory. Of the three finals in three years between the Revolution and the Dynamo, it was the only one won by the Revolution. Revolution investor/operator Robert Kraft, who attended the match, stated afterward that he hoped the title was one of many future championships, although it would take until the 2021 Supporters' Shield for the Revolution to win their next trophy.

On November 21, 2008, MLS announced that the 2009 SuperLiga would be contested by the top four teams in the 2008 MLS regular season standings not already competing in the CONCACAF Champions League in 2009–10. The Dynamo did not qualify as they were competing in the Champions League, while the Revolution did qualify for and were eliminated in the semifinals after a 2–1 loss to the Chicago Fire. Both the Dynamo and the Revolution qualified for the 2010 Superliga. The Dynamo reached the semifinals of that tournament, losing 1–0 to Atlético Morelia. The Revolution reached the finals, losing 2–1 to Morelia. The tournament was discontinued after the 2010 edition, with MLS commissioner Don Garber stating that "SuperLiga was a great tournament which served its purpose during its time. CONCACAF got more and more committed to a continental tournament with the Champions League, which we're very supportive of. It has delivered the value we intended in SuperLiga to put our teams against the best competition in this region." The Revolution were the only MLS club to win the SuperLiga over its four editions.
