= 2007 U.S. Open Cup final =

2007 final of the Lamar Hunt U.S. Open Cup

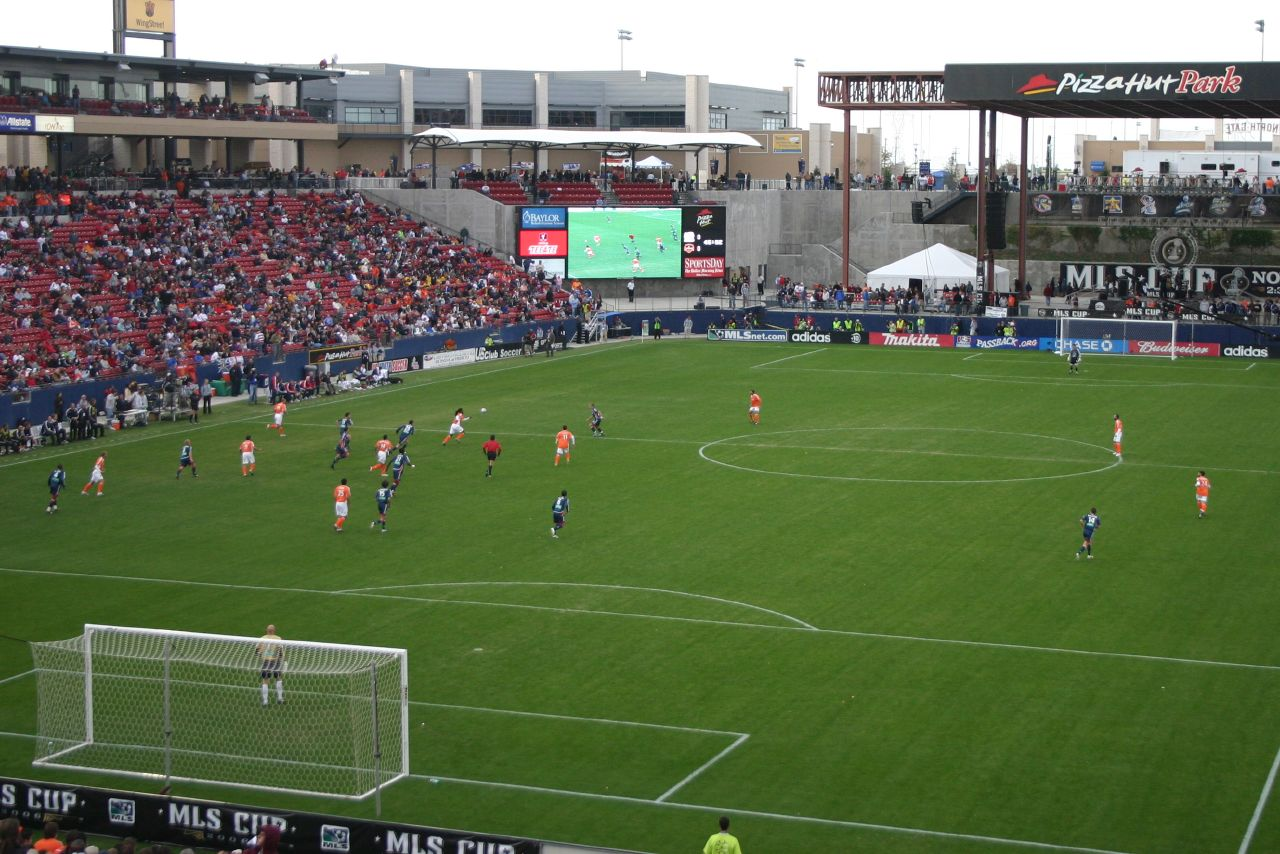
- Pizza Hut Park, the host venue for the final.
- Event: 2007 U.S. Open Cup
New England Revolution	FC Dallas
MLS	MLS
3	2
- Date: October 3, 2007
- Venue: Pizza Hut Park, Frisco, Texas
- Referee: Alex Prus
- Attendance: 10,618
- Weather: Clear, 84 °F (29 °C)

The 2007 Lamar Hunt U.S. Open Cup final was played on October 3, 2007, at Pizza Hut Park in Frisco, Texas. The match determined the winner of the 2007 U.S. Open Cup, a tournament open to amateur and professional soccer teams affiliated with the United States Soccer Federation. This was the 94th edition of the oldest ongoing competition in United States soccer. The match was won by the New England Revolution, who defeated FC Dallas 3–2. New England's goals were scored by Pat Noonan, Taylor Twellman, and Wells Thompson, and the win marked the club's first ever trophy.

== Route to the final ==
The Lamar Hunt U.S. Open Cup is an annual soccer competition open to adult teams in the United States that are affiliated with the United States Soccer Federation. Its 40 participants include professional and amateur teams, with the exception of reserve and academy teams that are directly owned and operated by Major League Soccer (MLS) clubs. The 2007 tournament was the 94th edition of the U.S. Open Cup, the oldest cup competition in the United States.

Pairings for the competition were announced on Tuesday, May 29, 2007. The 2007 tournament was the first since 2002 to not include all Major League Soccer teams. Instead, MLS had eight teams in the tournament; six qualified automatically, while the remaining six US-based sides participated in a playoff for the final two positions.

Both of the finalists, the New England Revolution and FC Dallas play in MLS, and both teams entered the tournament in the third round. The teams had met 29 times previously, with 19 wins for the Revolution, 9 wins for FC Dallas, and one draw. The two teams had never met before in an Open Cup match.

=== New England Revolution ===
Round	Opponent	Score
3rd	Rochester Raging Rhinos (USL-1) (A)	4–2
QF	Harrisburg City Islanders (USL-2) (H)	2–1
SF	Carolina RailHawks (USL-1) (H)	2–1
Key: (H) = Home; (A) = Away

The New England Revolution (nicknamed the Revs) entered MLS in the league's inaugural season, 1996. The Revs had yet to win trophy in their history. The Revs had previously advanced to the Open Cup final in 2001, losing 2–1 in extra time to the LA Galaxy. Additionally, the Revs reached the 2002, 2005, and 2006 MLS Cup Finals, but lost each of these games. Both the 2005, and 2006 finals were played at Pizza Hut Park, which would host the 2007 U.S. Open Cup Final.

The Revs entered the tournament in the third round, facing the Rochester Raging Rhinos on June 12 away at PAETEC Park in Rochester, New York in front of a crowd of 8,551 people. They took an early lead thanks to a Steve Ralston goal in the 19th minute, and later doubled the lead in the 67th minute with a goal from Taylor Twellman. The Rhinos managed to bring the game level thanks to two goals from Hamed Diallo, although the Revs pulled ahead again with an 89th minute goal from Twellman, and a stoppage time goal off of a penalty from Ralston.

Their quarterfinals fixture was a home matchup against the Harrisburg City Islanders played at Gillette Stadium in front of a crowd of 1,512 people on August 8. The Revs took an early lead in this game with goals in the 3rd and 17th minutes from Andy Dorman and Taylor Twellman respectively. Despite a long-range goal from the Islanders' Matt Tanzini with 12 minutes left to play, the Revs held on and advanced to the semifinals.

In the semifinals, the Revs faced the Carolina RailHawks in New Britain, Connecticut on September 4. The match was attended by 4,203 people. The RailHawks took a quick lead with a 6th minute goal from Anthony Maher. A confrontation led to the Revolution's Shalrie Joseph and the RailHawks' Connally Edozien being sent off in the 42nd minute, and the Revs equalized thanks to a Jeff Larentowicz goal in first-half stoppage time. The RailHawks saw another dismissal, with David Stokes shown red late in the second half for a pull on Adam Cristman. Early in extra time, Pat Noonan scored the game-winning goal, securing the Revs' place in the final.

=== FC Dallas ===
Round	Opponent	Score
3rd	Atlanta Silverbacks FC (USL-1) (H)	1–1 (a.e.t.); 4–3 (p)
QF	Charleston Battery (USL-1) (A)	2–1
SF	Seattle Souders (USL-1) (A)	2–1
Key: (H) = Home; (A) = Away

Like the New England Revolution, FC Dallas (nicknamed the Hoops) was also an original MLS club, and began play in 1996. Dallas had reached two previous Open Cup finals. The first was a penalty shootout win in 1997 against D.C. United. The second was a 2005 loss to the LA Galaxy. The 1997 win was the only trophy the club had won going into the final.

Dallas opened their Open Cup campaign against the Atlanta Silverbacks on July 9 at Pizza Hut Park in front of 2,510 spectators. The first half remained scoreless, and the Hoops opened the scoring in the 74th minute with a goal from Carlos Ruiz. Four minutes later, the Silverbacks equalized off of a goal from Daniel Antoniuk. In the 82nd minute, Antoniuk was set off for violent conduct after his left leg connected with the face of Drew Moor. The match concluded with a penalty shootout, in which the Hoops won 4-3 and advancing to the quarterfinals.

On August 7, Dallas faced off against the Charleston Battery in a quarterfinals matchup at Blackbaud Stadium in Charleston, South Carolina in front of a 3,262 person crowd. The Battery took an early lead, with a 16th minute goal scored by Stephen Armstrong. Dallas's Clarence Goodson equalized in the 22nd minute off of a Dax McCarty corner kick. No further goals were scored until extratime, when Arturo Alvarez scored a 96th minute game-winner.

In the semifinals, Dallas went on the road again to face the Seattle Sounders (1994-2008) on September 4. The match was played at Qwest Field in front of 10,385 people. Dallas' Carlos Ruiz scored the first goal of the match in the 92nd minute during extratime. Dallas doubled their lead in the 119th minute when Abe Thompson converted a penalty kick. The Sounders scored before the end of the second OT with a goal from Leighton O'Brien, but failed to find an equalizer. This result qualified Dallas for the final, without recording a win in regulation time for any of their three matches.

== Match ==
=== Summary ===
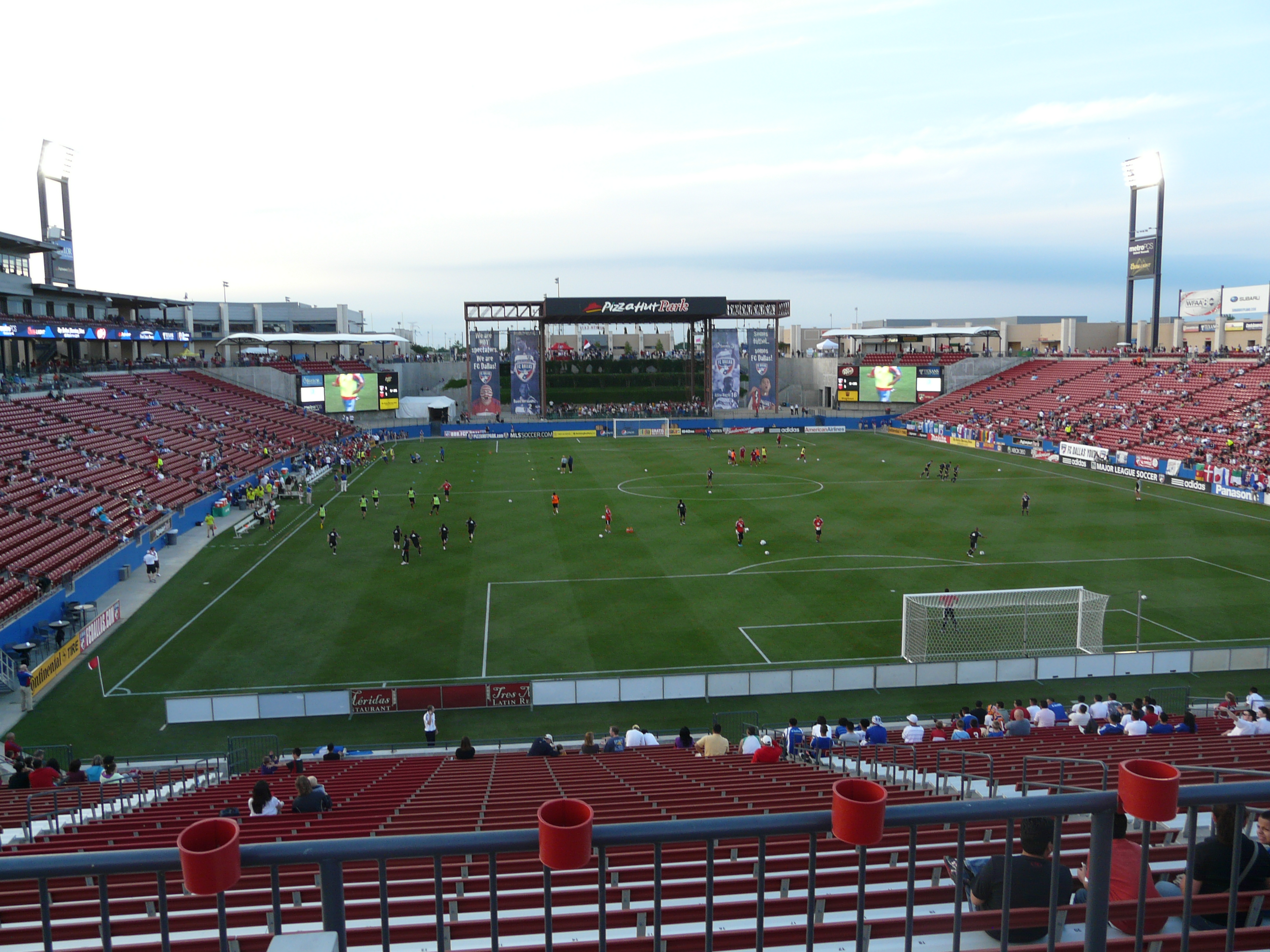
Pizza Hut Park hosted the final

The final was played on October 3 in front of 10,618 fans. Shalrie Joseph was absent from the Revs' lineup after being shown a red card in the semifinals, and Joe Franchino was also marked as out for a long-term absence. For Dallas, Roberto Miña and Marcelo Saragosa were both out. This match was the first and only MLS vs. MLS matchup in this edition of the Open Cup. The Revs opened the scoring in the 21st minute when Pat Noonan tapped in the ball from close range. The score was leveled in the 30th minute by an Arturo Alvarez goal. The Revs closed the half with a 41st minute goal from Taylor Twellman. The Revs made the score 3–1 in the 58th minute with a goal from midfielder Wells Thompson. Dallas quickly fired back with a goal in the 64th minute from Clarence Goodson, but the Revs' lead held and the game ended in a 3–2 victory for New England.

=== Details ===
October 3, 2007
7:00 pm CDT

New England Revolution (MLS)	3–2	FC Dallas (MLS)
Noonan 21'; Twellman 41'; Thompson 57'	TheCup.us report	Álvarez 30'; Thompson 64'

Pizza Hut Park, Frisco, Texas
Attendance: 10,618
Referee: Alex Prus (United States)

New England Revolution	FC Dallas

GK	1	(United States) Matt Reis
CB	6	(United States) Jay Heaps
CB	15	(United States) Michael Parkhurst
CB	27	(United States) Wells Thompson		(substituted off) 78'
RM	14	(United States) Steve Ralston (c)
CM	13	(United States) Jeff Larentowicz	(yellow card) 74'
CM	25	(Wales) Andy Dorman
LM	18	(Bermuda) Khano Smith
RF	16	(United States) James Riley	(yellow card) 86'
CF	20	(United States) Taylor Twellman
LF	11	(United States) Pat Noonan
Substitutes:
FW	7	(United States) Adam Cristman		(substituted on) 78'
GK	12	(United States) Doug Warren
DF	17	(United States) Gary Flood
DF	19	(United States) Kyle Helton
MF	21	(The Gambia) Sainey Nyassi
MF	22	(United States) Marshall Leonard
DF	29	(The Gambia) Abdoulie Mansally

(Argentina) Dario Sala
(United States) David Wagenfuhr	(substituted off) 76'
(United States) Clarence Goodson
(Canada) Adrian Serioux
(United States) Drew Moor
(United States) Dax McCarty
(Argentina) Pablo Ricchetti	(substituted off) 46'
(Colombia) Juan Toja
(Ghana) Dominic Oduro
(El Salvador) Arturo Álvarez
(Guatemala) Carlos Ruiz
Substitutes:
(United States) Kenny Cooper	(substituted on) 76'
(United States) Alex Yi	(substituted on) 46'	(substituted off) 63'
(United States) Abe Thompson	(substituted on) 63'
(United States) Ray Burse
(Liberia) Chris Gbandi
(United States) Aaron Pitchkolan
(United States) Bobby Rhine

Assistant referees:
George Gansner
Kermit Quisenberry
Fourth official:
Terry Vaughn

== Post-match ==
The Revolution were awarded $100,000 for winning the cup, and FC Dallas received $50,000. Additionally, the result qualified the Revs for the preliminary round of the 2008–09 CONCACAF Champions League. The Revolution were the first champion from Massachusetts since the Fall River Ponte Delgada won the 1947 Open Cup. The teams would next meet in the Open Cup in the 2016 final, which ended in a 4–2 victory for FC Dallas.
