= 2004 MLS All-Star Game =

Soccer game played in Washington, D.C.

Sierra Mist MLS All-Star Game 2004
- Event: 2004 Major League Soccer season
MLS West	MLS East
(United States)	(United States)
2	3
- Date: July 31, 2004
- Venue: RFK Stadium, Washington, D.C.
- Man of the Match: Amado Guevara (MLS East)
- Referee: Michael Kennedy
- Attendance: 21,378
- Weather: Clear, 85°F

The 2004 Major League Soccer All-Star Game was the 9th Major League Soccer All-Star Game, played on July 31, 2004 at RFK Stadium in Washington, D.C. between the Eastern Conference All-Stars and Western Conference All-Stars. The Eastern Conference earned the victory after a hard-fought 3-2 win over the West.

== Overview ==
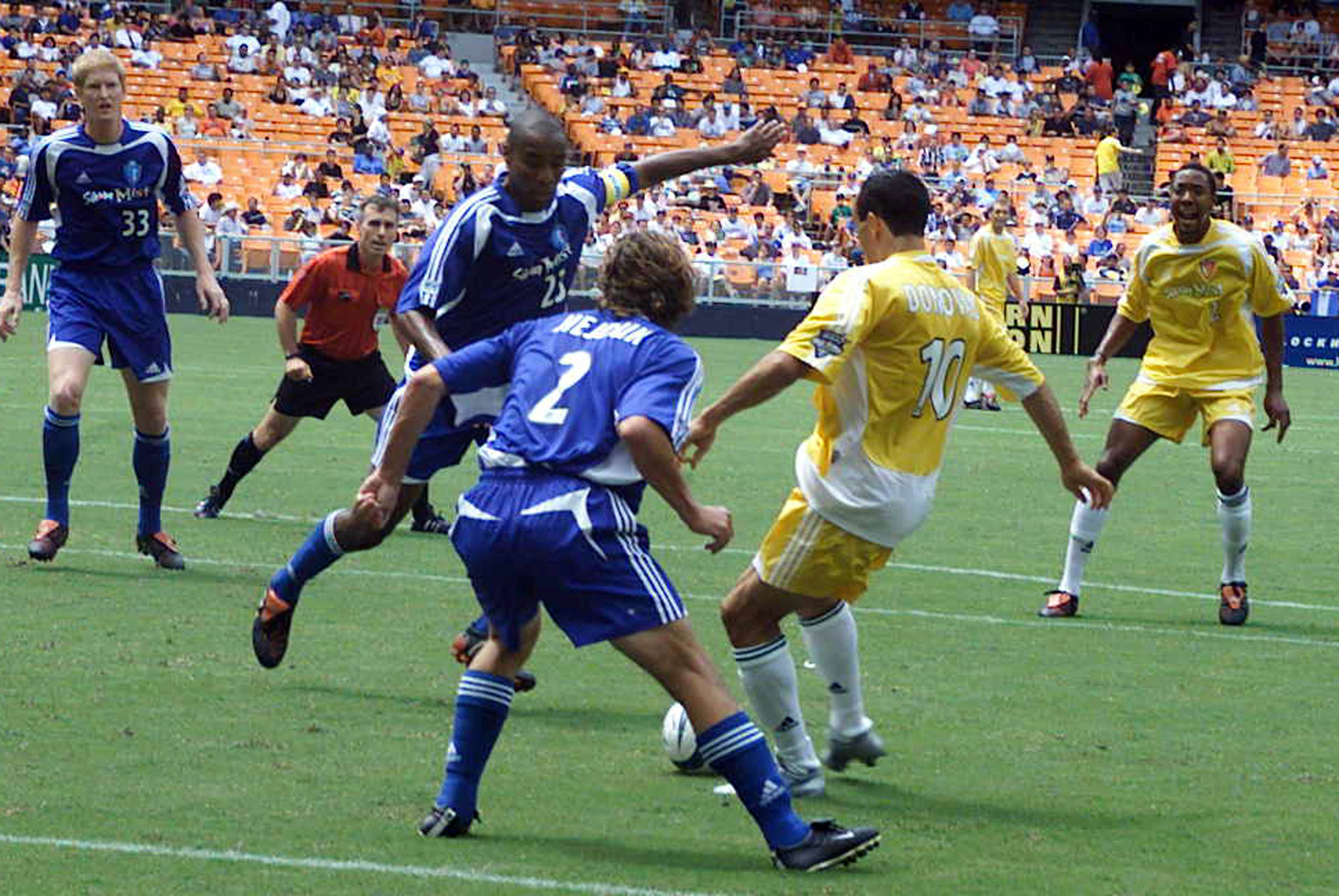
Landon Donovan has the ball while surrounded by Eddie Pope, Jim Curtin and Frankie Hejduk

The game was originally scheduled to be between the MLS All-Stars against Real Madrid at Gillette Stadium in Foxborough, Massachusetts. Once the Spanish team instead decided to play friendlies in Japan, they opted out of the game in the United States and MLS was forced to change the All-Star Game's format. The MLS All-Stars eventually played Real Madrid at their home stadium Santiago Bernabéu in the 2005 Trofeo Santiago Bernabéu.

== Legends game ==
Prior to the All-Star Game, a celebration of the tenth anniversary of the 1994 FIFA World Cup saw the U.S. Team that played the Cup against played a selection of international MLS veterans in two 25-minute halves. The game finished 2-2, with Raúl Díaz Arce and Mauricio Cienfuegos tying the game in the second-half after the Americans built a lead with Eric Wynalda and Hugo Perez.

U.S. 1994 World Cup Squad

- Tony Meola, Mike Burns, Alexi Lalas, Cle Kooiman, Thomas Dooley, John Harkes, Hugo Pérez, Tab Ramos, Eric Wynalda, Frank Klopas Cobi Jones, Juergen Sommer, Mike Sorber, Marcelo Balboa, Paul Caligiuri, Fernando Clavijo.
- Coach: Bora Milutinović

MLS International Stars

- Jorge Campos, Mike Emenalo, Richard Gough, Martín Vásquez, Frank Yallop, Mauricio Cienfuegos, Marco Etcheverry, Peter Nowak, Mauricio Ramos, Carlos Valderrama, Robert Warzycha, Raúl Díaz Arce, Carlos Hermosillo, Luis Hernández, Mo Johnston, Giovanni Savarese.
- Coach: Bruce Arena

== Match details ==
2004 MLS All-Star Game
July 31, 2004
20:00 EST

MLS West (United States)	2–3	(United States) MLS East
Ching 43'; Kreis 89'	Report	Guevara 20', 22' (pen.); Eskandarian 74'

RFK Memorial Stadium, Washington, D.C.
Attendance: 21,378
Referee: Michael Kennedy

MLS West	MLS East

GK	1	(Canada) Pat Onstad	(substituted off) 46'
DF	4	(United States) Chris Albright
DF	12	(United States) Jeff Agoos	(substituted off) 73'
DF	14	(United States) Cory Gibbs	(substituted off) 46' (substituted in) 73'
DF	31	(United States) Jimmy Conrad
MF	15	(Austria) Andreas Herzog	(substituted off) 46'
MF	23	(United States) Richard Mulrooney	(substituted off) 46' (substituted in) 73'
MF	6	(Republic of Ireland) Ronnie O'Brien	(substituted off) 73'
FW	24	(United States) Brian Ching	(substituted off) 46'
FW	5	(United States) Landon Donovan
FW	20	(Guatemala) Carlos Ruiz	(substituted off) 73'
Substitutes:
GK	22	(United States) Kevin Hartman	(substituted in) 46'
MF	16	(United States) Kerry Zavagnin	(substituted in) 46'
MF	11	(United States) Chris Klein	(substituted in) 46'
FW	9	(United States) Jason Kreis	(substituted in) 46'
MF	7	(United States) Jovan Kirovski	(substituted in) 46'
DF	25	(United States) Pablo Mastroeni
FW	99	(United States) Josh Wolff
DF	13	(United States) Danny Califf
Manager:
(United States) Sigi Schmid

GK	13	(United States) Henry Ring	(substituted off) 46'
DF	2	(United States) Frankie Hejduk
DF	33	(United States) Jim Curtin
DF	25	(United States) Robin Fraser
DF	23	(United States) Eddie Pope	(substituted off) 46'
MF	14	(United States) Chris Armas	(substituted off) 46'
MF	24	(United States) Eddie Gaven	(substituted off) 46' (substituted in) 81'
MF	20	(Honduras) Amado Guevara	(substituted off) 81'
FW	30	(Ukraine) Dema Kovalenko
FW	99	(Bolivia) Jaime Moreno
FW	3	(United States) Damani Ralph	(substituted off) 46'
Substitutes:
GK	1	(United States) Jon Busch	(substituted in) 46'
MF	12	(United States) Steve Ralston	(substituted in) 46'
MF	5	(Grenada) Shalrie Joseph	(substituted in) 46'
FW	17	(United States) Pat Noonan	(substituted in) 46'
FW	9	(United States) Freddy Adu	(substituted in) 46'
FW	11	(United States) Alecko Eskandarian	(substituted in) 46'
DF	8	(United States) Ryan Nelsen
MF	15	(United States) Clint Dempsey
MF	16	(United States) Ben Olsen
Manager:
(Poland) Piotr Nowak
