= 2008 North American SuperLiga =

SuperLiga 2008

Tournament details
- Host country: United States
- Dates: July 12 – August 5
- Teams: 8 (from 1 confederation)
- Venues: 7 (in 7 host cities)

Final positions
- Champions: (United States) New England Revolution
- Runners-up: (United States) Houston Dynamo

Tournament statistics
- Matches played: 15
- Goals scored: 36 (2.4 per match)
- Attendance: 194,414 (12,961 per match)
- Top scorer(s): (Grenada) Shalrie Joseph (United States) Stuart Holden (United States) Ante Razov (3 goals)

The 2008 SuperLiga was the second edition of the SuperLiga competition. The top four Major League Soccer and Primera División de México teams by point totals at the end of the season earned qualification. All games of the tournament were broadcast live on Fox Sports World in Canada (English), Telefutura in the United States (Spanish), and Televisa and TV Azteca in Mexico (both Spanish).

== Qualification ==
The eight teams in the 2008 edition were selected based on qualification rules set by their respective leagues. The 2008 SuperLiga contestants were:

From (United States) Major League Soccer:

- D.C. United (2007 Supporters' Shield winners)
- Chivas USA (2007 season 2nd overall)
- Houston Dynamo (2007 season 3rd overall)
- New England Revolution (2007 season 4th overall)

From (Mexico) Primera División de México:

- Guadalajara (2006 Apertura champions)
- Pachuca (2007 Clausura champions)
- Atlante (2007 Apertura champions)
- Santos Laguna (2008 Clausura champions)

== Group stage ==
There were two groups of four teams. Each group contained two clubs from each league with the top two teams from each groups advancing to the semifinals.

=== Group A ===
Pos	Team	Pld	W	D	L	GF	GA	GD	Pts
1	(United States) Houston Dynamo	3	2	0	1	7	2	+5	6
2	(Mexico) Atlante	3	2	0	1	5	6	−1	6
3	(Mexico) Guadalajara	3	2	0	1	3	3	0	6
4	(United States) D.C. United	3	0	0	3	4	8	−4	0

Source: Livesport
July 12, 2008
20:00 EDT

D.C. United	1–2	Guadalajara
Emilio 76'	Report	Arellano 23'; Pineda 72'

RFK Stadium, Washington, D.C.
Attendance: 22,453
Referee: Walter Quesada (Costa Rica)
July 12, 2008
22:00 EDT

Houston Dynamo	4–0	Atlante
De Rosario 20' (red card) 44'; Holden 21' 29'; Mullan 54'	Report	Muñoz (red card) 45'

Robertson Stadium, Houston, Texas
Attendance: 13,105
Referee: Courtney Campbell (Jamaica)

July 15, 2008
20:00 EDT

D.C. United	2–3	Atlante
Doe 28'; Emilio 79'	Report	Gabriel Rey 15' 44'; Bermudez 49'

RFK Stadium, Washington, D.C.
Attendance: 12,122
Referee: Carlos Batres (Guatemala)
July 15, 2008
22:00 EDT

Houston Dynamo	0–1	Guadalajara
	Report	Arellano 71'

Robertson Stadium, Houston, Texas
Attendance: 28,723
Referee: Enrico Wijngaarde (Suriname)

July 19, 2008
20:00 EDT

D.C. United	1–3	Houston Dynamo
Doe 76'	Report	Clark 12'; Boswell 29'; Holden 84'

RFK Stadium, Washington, D.C.
Attendance: 12,893
Referee: Alex Prus (United States)
July 19, 2008
22:00 EDT

Atlante	2–0	Guadalajara
Maldonado 42'; Espinoza 88'	Report

Buck Shaw Stadium, Santa Clara, California
Attendance: 10,370
Referee: Hugo Leon Guajardo (Mexico)

=== Group B ===
Pos	Team	Pld	W	D	L	GF	GA	GD	Pts
1	(United States) New England Revolution	3	2	1	0	3	1	+2	7
2	(Mexico) Pachuca	3	1	1	1	3	3	0	4
3	(United States) Chivas USA	3	1	1	1	3	3	0	4
4	(Mexico) Santos Laguna	3	0	1	2	1	3	−2	1

Source: Livesport
July 13, 2008
20:00 EDT

New England Revolution	1–0	Santos Laguna
Dube 70'	Report	Rodriguez (red card) 40'

Gillette Stadium, Foxborough, Massachusetts
Attendance: 10,118
Referee: Enrico Wijngaarde (Suriname)
July 13, 2008
22:00 EDT

Chivas USA	1–2	Pachuca
Razov 16'	Report	Marioni 23'; Caballero 42'

The Home Depot Center, Carson, California
Attendance: 14,528
Referee: Carlos Batres (Guatemala)

July 16, 2008
20:00 EDT

New England Revolution	1–0	Pachuca
Smith 90+6' (pen.)	Report

Gillette Stadium, Foxborough, Massachusetts
Attendance: 9,614
Referee: Walter Quesada (Costa Rica)
July 16, 2008
22:00 EDT

Chivas USA	1–0	Santos Laguna
Razov 73'	Report

The Home Depot Center, Carson, California
Attendance: 16,343
Referee: Courtney Campbell (Jamaica)

July 20, 2008
20:00 EDT

Chivas USA	1–1	New England Revolution
Razov 59'	Report	Joseph 78'

Titan Stadium, Fullerton, California
Attendance: 4,738
Referee: Abiodun Okulaja (United States)
July 20, 2008
22:00 EDT

Santos Laguna	1–1	Pachuca
Benítez 72'	Report	Álvarez 4'

Pizza Hut Park, Frisco, Texas
Attendance: 6,157
Referee: German Arredondo (Mexico)

== Knockout stage ==
=== Bracket ===
Semi-finals
July 29 – Houston, TX
(United States) Houston Dynamo	2
(Mexico) Pachuca	0
July 30 – Foxborough, MA
(United States) New England Revolution	1
(Mexico) Atlante	0

Final
August 5 – Foxborough, MA
(United States) Houston Dynamo	2 (5)
(United States) New England Revolution (p)	2 (6)

=== Semi-finals ===
July 29, 2008
22:00 EDT

Houston Dynamo	2–0	Pachuca
Boswell 77'; Ashe 87'	Report

Robertson Stadium, Houston, Texas
Attendance: 16,679
Referee: Neal Brizan (Trinidad & Tobago)
July 30, 2008
20:00 EDT

New England Revolution	1–0	Atlante
Joseph 30'; Heaps (red card) 90+'	Report	Rey (red card) 85'; Zamora (yellow card) 90+' (red card); Vilar (yellow card) 90+' (red card); Muñoz (red card) 90+'; Venegas (red card) 90+'

Gillette Stadium, Foxborough, Massachusetts
Attendance: 8,302
Referee: Carlos Batres (Guatemala)

=== Final ===
August 5, 2008
20:00 EDT

New England Revolution	2–2 (a.e.t.)	Houston Dynamo
Ralston 41'; Joseph (yellow card) 82'; Joseph 102'	Report	Davis (yellow card) 14'; Jaqua 18'; Kamara 98'
Penalties
Ralston (penalty scored); Reis (penalty missed); Joseph (penalty scored); Twellman (penalty scored); Smith (penalty missed); Larentowicz (penalty scored); Tierney (penalty scored); Albright (penalty scored)	6–5	(penalty scored) Waibel; (penalty scored) Wondolowski; (penalty missed) De Rosario; (penalty missed) Ching; (penalty scored) Clark; (penalty scored) Barrett; (penalty scored) Kamara; (penalty missed) Ashe

Gillette Stadium, Foxborough, Massachusetts
Attendance: 9,242
Referee: Howard Webb (England)

2008 SuperLiga champions
(United States)
New England Revolution
1st title

== Goalscorers ==
3 goals

- (United States) Stuart Holden ( (United States) Houston Dynamo)
- (Grenada) Shalrie Joseph ( (United States) New England Revolution)
- (United States) Ante Razov ( (United States) Chivas USA)

2 goals

- (Mexico) Omar Arellano ( (Mexico) Guadalajara)
- (United States) Bobby Boswell ( (United States) Houston Dynamo)
- (Liberia) Francis Doe ( (United States) D.C. United)
- (Brazil) Luciano Emilio ( (United States) D.C. United)
- (Colombia) Luis Gabriel Rey ( (Mexico) Atlante)
- (United States) Corey Ashe ( (United States) Houston Dynamo)

1 goal

- (Argentina) Damián Ariel Álvarez ( (Mexico) Pachuca)
- (Ecuador) Cristian Benítez ( (Mexico) Santos Laguna)
- (Mexico) Christian Bermudez ( (Mexico) Atlante)
- (Mexico) Gabriel Caballero ( (Mexico) Pachuca)
- (United States) Ricardo Clark ( (United States) Houston Dynamo)
- (Canada) Dwayne De Rosario ( (United States) Houston Dynamo)
- (Zimbabwe) Kheli Dube ( (United States) New England Revolution)
- (Mexico) Gerardo Espinoza ( (Mexico) Atlante)
- (Venezuela) Giancarlo Maldonado ( (Mexico) Atlante)
- (Argentina) Bruno Marioni ( (Mexico) Pachuca)
- (United States) Brian Mullan ( (United States) Houston Dynamo)
- (Mexico) Gonzalo Pineda ( (Mexico) Guadalajara)
- (Bermuda) Khano Smith ( (United States) New England Revolution)
- (United States) Nate Jaqua ( (United States) Houston Dynamo)
- (United States) Steve Ralston ( (United States) New England Revolution)
- (Sierra Leone) Kei Kamara ( (United States) Houston Dynamo)
