= Shalrie Joseph =

Grenadian footballer (born 1978)

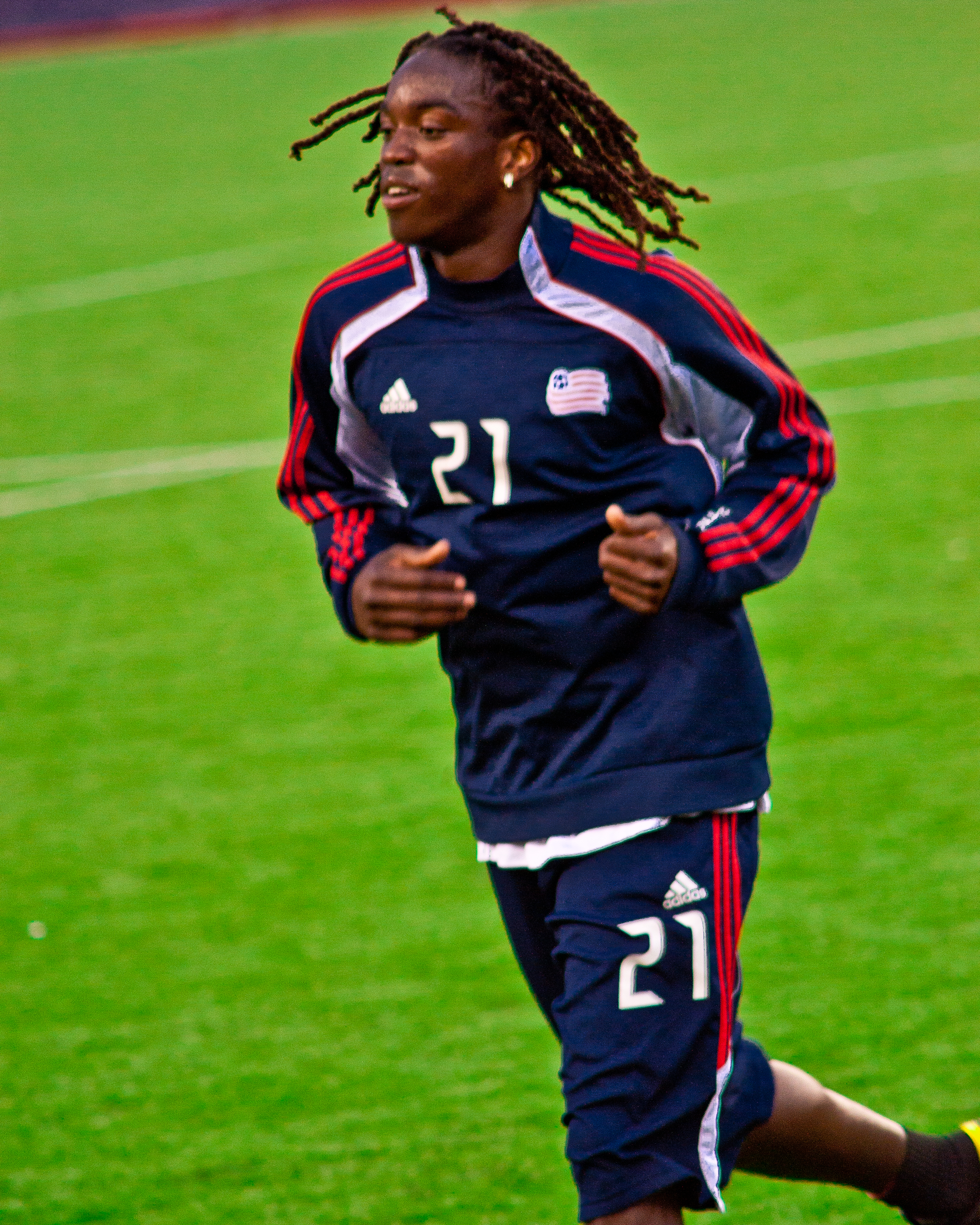
- Joseph warming-up for the New England Revolution in 2010

Personal information
- Full name: Shalrie Jamal Joseph
- Date of birth: May 24, 1978 (age 48)
- Place of birth: St. George's, Grenada
- Height: 6 ft 3 in (1.91 m)
- Position: Defensive midfielder

College career
Years	Team	Apps	(Gls)
1998–1999	Bryant & Stratton Bobcats		
2000–2001	St. John's Red Storm		

Senior career*
Years	Team	Apps	(Gls)
2002	New York Freedom	18	(7)
2003–2012	New England Revolution	261	(37)
2012	Chivas USA	12	(2)
2013	Seattle Sounders FC	10	(1)
2014	New England Revolution	0	(0)
2016–2017	FC Boston	4	(0)
Total		305	(47)

International career^{‡}
2002–2008	Grenada	20	(1)

Managerial career
- 2018–2019: Grenada
- 2020–2021: New England Revolution (academy)
- 2022–2023: New England Revolution (assistant)
- 2025–: San Jose Earthquakes (assistant)
- * Club domestic league appearances and goals as of June 28, 2016 ‡ National team caps and goals as of April 3, 2009

Shalrie Jamal Joseph (born May 24, 1978) is a Grenadian former professional footballer and coach. After playing college soccer at Bryant & Stratton College and St. John’s University, Joseph was drafted in the 2002 MLS SuperDraft by the New England Revolution where he played from 2003-2012. A multiple time MLS All-Star and MLS Best XI selection during his tenure with the Revolution, he also helped the club win their first trophies, The US Open Cup 2007, and the North American SuperLiga in 2008. Internationally he made 20 appearances for Grenada national team throughout his career.

Following his retirement in 2017, Joseph has transitioned into coaching, he is currently an assistant coach for the San Jose Earthquakes.

== Youth and college career ==
Joseph moved to Brooklyn, New York with his family as a teenager. He played college soccer at Bryant & Stratton College where he was a two time All-American. and St. John's University, New York, graduating in 2002. He led the Red Storm in scoring in 2000, scoring 14 goals along with two assists. In 2001, he helped lead the team to their second final four appearance in the NCAA tournament. His two-year career at St. John’s seen him score 21 goals which ranks 10th all-time. Both years at St. John’s he earned NSCAA All-America honors and All-Big East honors.

== Playing career ==
=== Professional ===
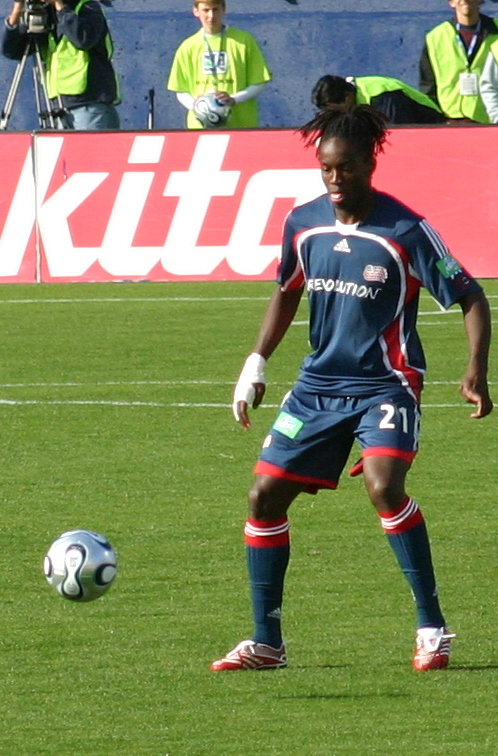
Joseph playing for the Revs in the MLS Cup 2006.

==== New England ====
Joseph was drafted fourteenth overall in the 2002 MLS SuperDraft by the New England Revolution on February 10, 2002, signing with the club on December 2, 2002. He did not join the team until the 2003 season, having spent much of 2002 searching for a club overseas and later playing for the New York Freedom of USL D-3 Pro League. Upon joining the Revolution, Joseph quickly proved himself to be one of the most talented defensive midfielders in the league. Joseph made his MLS debut on April 19, 2003, coming on as a 46th minute substitute for Daniel Hernández in a 2-1 loss to the Columbus Crew. He made his first full Revolution start the following week on April 26 in a 2-1 win over the Dallas Burn. Joseph scored his first MLS goal on September 28, 2003 in a 3-2 overtime win over the Columbus Crew.

In 2004, Joseph played in 23 regular season matches, amassing three assists, missing games due to national team duty, a broken nose, and hip / quad injuries. He was named a 2004 Sierra Mist All-Star for his efforts.

In 2005, Joseph was again named an MLS All-Star, and additionally named Revolution team MVP, and named to the MLS Best XI. He recorded his first MLS brace on September 17.

In August 2006, Joseph had a $1 million offer from Celtic F.C., but MLS rejected the offer. Joseph was voted 2006 Revolution Best Defender by the New England soccer media, and was again named an MLS All-Star after scoring three goals along with one assist.

In January 2007, another offer of $2 million from Celtic was also rejected by MLS. He was again named MLS Best XI, and an MLS All-Star. Although he was suspended for the 2007 U.S. Open Cup Final, Joseph made two starts for the Revs during their Open Cup run, recording an assist in their quarter finals match-up against the Harrisburg City Islanders, helping the club win its first-ever piece of silverware. During that year he scored four goals and tallied five assists four of which were on game winning goals.

In the 2008 Major League Soccer season, he started and played the entire MLS All-Star Game versus West Ham United. The All-stars won that game 3–2, making them 5–0 all time against foreign teams. Joseph played in 27 regular season matches for the Revolution, deployed as both a defensive midfielder and a striker. He wore the captain's armband for the Revolution for the first time following an injury to Steve Ralston. He was named to the 2008 MLS Best XI - the third time he would receive the honor. Joseph's lone goal against Atlante F.C. in the 2008 North American SuperLiga semi-finals saw the Revolution through to the final, He would score again in the 2008 North American SuperLiga final, and convert a penalty kick, helping the Revolution lift their second-ever piece of silverware.

Shalrie finished the 2009 New England Revolution season as a finalist for league MVP. He was additionally voted New England Revolution MVP, and 2009 Midnight Riders’ Man of the Year. He received MLS All-Star honors for the sixth time, but missed the match due to injury. He concluded the season as the team's golden boot winner, with a career-high 8 goals scored and 6 assists.

In the 2010 New England Revolution season, Shalrie became the Revolution's captain, after previous captain Steve Ralston left the Revolution to join AC St. Louis. Later in 2010, Joseph took a leave of absence from the team while he was involved in the Major League Soccer substance abuse and behavioral health program. Joseph returned to the Revolution at the end of May. He received 2010 MLS All-Star honors, scoring five goals and four assists on the year.

During the 2011 New England Revolution season, Joseph became only the second Revolution player (behind Jay Heaps) in club history to log 20,000 career minutes, doing so in the 54th minute of the July 4 match against Real Salt Lake. He was named an MLS All-star for the 2011 season. He additionally won the Revolution team Golden Boot for the second time, leading the team in scoring with eight goals.

The Revolution signed Joseph to a Designated Player contract for the 2012 season.

==== Later career ====
On August 1, 2012, Joseph was traded to Chivas USA in exchange for Blair Gavin, a second round pick in the 2013 MLS SuperDraft, and allocation money. On August 29, 2012, Joseph scored a brace against the Revolution in his first match against his old club. During the match, Joseph became the first player in Major League Soccer history to face a club for which he had previously appeared in 250+ matches.

On February 19, 2013, Joseph was traded to Seattle Sounders FC along with second round picks in the 2014 MLS SuperDraft and 2015 MLS SuperDraft, and a swap in allocation order. He scored his first (and only) goal for Seattle in an August 17 loss to the Houston Dynamo.

In April 2014, Joseph rejoined the New England Revolution.

On May 21, 2016, Joseph signed up to play with Premier Development League side FC Boston.

Joseph retired from soccer in 2017, throughout his career he made 283 career appearances in the MLS including a then Revolution-club record 261 appearances. He has scored 40 career goals along with 35 career assists in the regular season. In 2020, Revolution team President Brian Bilello stated "Shalrie is without question one of the greatest players to ever put on a Revolution uniform."

== International career ==
Joseph was a member of the Grenada national team, for whom he has played for in the Caribbean Cup, the 2009 CONCACAF Gold Cup, and World Cup qualifiers.

== Coaching career ==
Joseph became head coach of Grenada national team in March 2018. In March 2020, Joseph returned to the United States and joined his former club the New England Revolution in a coaching role. He would depart the Revolution in September of 2023, following the resignation of then-head coach Bruce Arena. He would join Arena’s staff as an assistant in San Jose in 2024.

== Personal life ==
Joseph earned his U.S. citizenship in 2009.

== Honors ==
New England Revolution

- North American SuperLiga: 2008
- Lamar Hunt U.S. Open Cup: 2007

Individual

- MLS All-Star: 2004, 2005, 2006, 2007, 2008, 2009, 2010, 2011
- MLS Best XI: 2005, 2007, 2008, 2009
- New England Revolution team MVP: 2005, 2009
- New England Revolution Defender of the Year: 2006
- Caribbean Footballer of the Year: 2007
- Midnight Riders Man of the Year: 2009, 2010
- New England Revolution All-Time Team: (2020)
- St. John's University Hall of Fame: (2024)
