= Doug Warren =

American soccer goalkeeper (born 1981)

Personal information
- Full name: Douglas Patrick Warren
- Date of birth: March 18, 1981 (age 45)
- Place of birth: Palatine, Illinois, United States
- Height: 6 ft 0 in (1.83 m)
- Position: Goalkeeper

Youth career
- 1999: Indiana
- 2000–2002: Clemson

Senior career*
Years	Team	Apps	(Gls)
2003–2004	D.C. United	8	(0)
2003	→ Richmond Kickers (loan)	4	(0)
2004–2008	New England Revolution	11	(0)
2004	→ Northern Virginia Royals (loan)	1	(0)

International career^{‡}
2001	United States U-20		
2002–2004	United States U-23	7	(0)
- * Club domestic league appearances and goals as of January 12, 2008 ‡ National team caps and goals as of June 11, 2006

Douglas Patrick Warren (born March 18, 1981, in Palatine, Illinois) is an American former soccer goalkeeper, who last played for the New England Revolution in Major League Soccer, in 2008. He was a member of the U.S. team at the 2001 FIFA World Youth Championship.

== Youth ==
Warren attended William Fremd High School where he was a Parade Magazine High School All American. He began his college soccer career at Indiana University, where he played in 1999. After his freshman season, Warren transferred to Clemson, where he emerged as one of the best goalkeepers in the NCAA. Named first team All-ACC all three years at Clemson, Warren was named a first team All-American as a senior in 2002, as he helped the Tigers to the Elite Eight.

In 2001, Warren was on the roster of the U.S. U-20 national team at the 2001 FIFA World Youth Championship. Beginning in 2002, he began playing with the U.S. U-23 national team as it prepared for the 2004 Summer Olympic qualification campaign.

== Professional ==
Following his senior season, Warren was drafted 14th overall in the 2003 MLS SuperDraft by D.C. United. A reserve for much of the year, Warren was forced into action late in the season when starter Nick Rimando suffered a season-ending ACL injury. Warren started the season's last five regular season games and both their playoff games, and although he impressed, failed to win a game.

In 2004, Warren again found himself as a backup to Rimando. However, shortly into the season, a string of mediocre performances by Rimando led Peter Nowak to give Warren another opportunity to seize the starting position. Warren started only one game, however, a loss in which he surrendered three goals, before being replaced again by rookie Troy Perkins. Perkins impressed enough to earn the starting job, and Warren was released soon thereafter. He spent the rest of the season with the New England Revolution, as an injury replacement for the injured Adin Brown. The Revolution acquired him for good after the season. He spent 2005 behind Matt Reis, making two appearances. Due to the consistency of Reis, Warren did not appear in MLS play in 2006 or 2007, although he remained the Revolution's second-choice keeper.

== Honors ==
=== New England Revolution ===
- Lamar Hunt U.S. Open Cup (1): 2007
