= Khano Smith =

Bermudian footballer

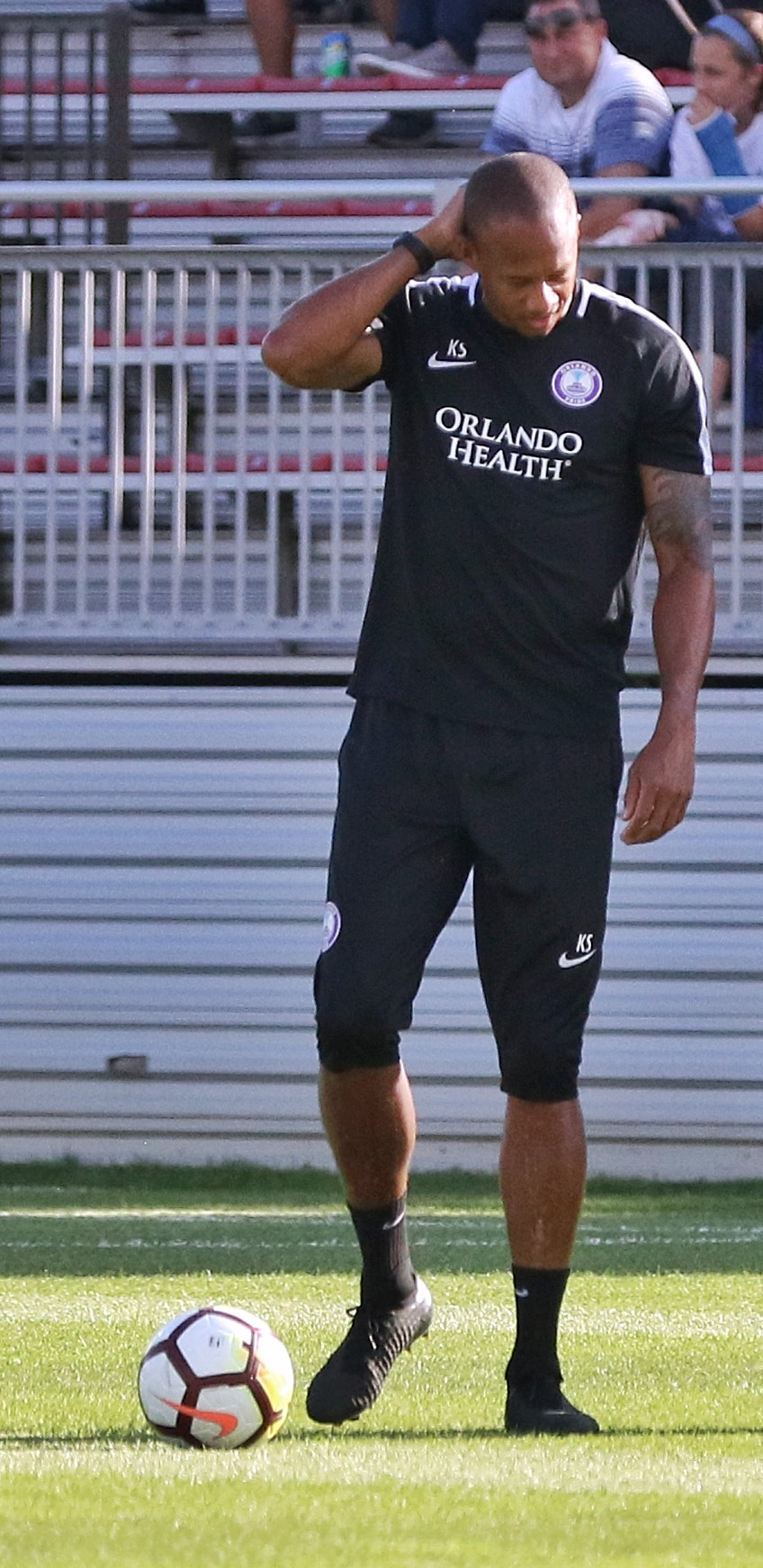

Personal information
- Full name: Khano Smith
- Date of birth: 10 January 1981 (age 45)
- Place of birth: Paget, Bermuda
- Height: 6 ft 3 in (1.91 m)
- Position: Left winger

Team information
- Current team: Rhode Island FC

College career
Years	Team	Apps	(Gls)
1999–2000	Champlain Beavers		
2001–2002	Lees-McRae Bobcats		

Senior career*
Years	Team	Apps	(Gls)
2003	Carolina Dynamo	12	(4)
2003–2005	Dandy Town Hornets	28	(15)
2005–2008	New England Revolution	85	(8)
2009	New York Red Bulls	8	(0)
2009–2010	Lincoln City	5	(0)
2010	New England Revolution	15	(0)
2011	Bermuda Hogges	5	(2)
2014	Real Boston Rams	1	(0)
Total		159	(29)

International career
2003–2012	Bermuda	33	(10)

Managerial career
- 2015: Southern New Hampshire Penmen (assistant)
- 2016–2018: Orlando Pride (assistant)
- 2019–2023: Birmingham Legion FC (assistant)
- 2024–: Rhode Island FC
- * Club domestic league appearances and goals

Khano Smith (born 10 January 1981) is a Bermudian retired footballer who is serving as a head coach and general manager for USL Championship club Rhode Island FC.

== Club career ==
=== College and amateur ===
Smith played college soccer at Champlain College and Lees-McRae College, and in the USL Premier Development League for Carolina Dynamo.

=== Professional career ===
Smith began his professional career playing for the Dandy Town Hornets, who he helped win the 2003–04 Cingular Wireless Premier Division title in his first year at the club. In his second season, he led the league in scoring as Dandy Town finished two points behind Devonshire Cougars. He captured his second trophy with the club in 2005 leading the Hornets to the Bermuda Champions Cup.

After two successful seasons in Bermuda, he moved to Major League Soccer and signed with the New England Revolution on April 15, 2005. He made his first start, and scored his first goal, on 4 June 2005 during a 1–1 tie with the Kansas City Wizards. Smith also scored the winning goal against the MetroStars which led the Revolution to the MLS Conference Championship in 2005. He came to be known in New England for his inconsistent play, showing occasional flashes of brilliance, but also making fundamental mistakes. He was also known for his pace and his crucial crosses which pick out his teammates for easy finishes.

He moved from an out and out striker to an attacking left wing back. In 2007 and 2008 he was the regular starter on the left wing and scored several crucial goals.

On 26 November 2008, Smith was selected by Seattle Sounders FC with the fourth pick in the 2008 MLS Expansion Draft. Before ever playing a match for the Sounders, he was traded to New York Red Bulls in exchange for allocation money. On 30 July 2009 New York waived Smith.

After trialing with Southend United, and playing for their reserves in a 4–0 defeat to Norwich City reserves in September 2009, Smith was offered a professional contract at Lincoln City, having impressed new manager Chris Sutton on a 10-day trial. On 23 October Smith was reported to have signed a 'short-term' deal with Lincoln.

Smith became an instant first team regular at Lincoln. However, he was dropped after six games, his final one coming in an FA Cup game at Northwich Victoria. He was released when his contract expired on 7 January 2010.

Smith re-signed with New England Revolution on 26 March 2010 after trialing with the team during pre-season.

After the 2010 Major League Soccer season New England declined Smith's contract option and he elected to participate in the 2010 MLS Re-Entry Draft. Smith became a free agent in Major League Soccer when he was not selected in the Re-Entry draft. On 7 March 2011 he signed with Carolina RailHawks of the North American Soccer League. However, Smith was not listed on the 2011 roster released by the club on 4 April 2011. In an interview with Bermuda's The Royal Gazette on 7 April, Smith stated he would not play for Carolina due to a contract dispute.

== International career ==
Smith made his debut for Bermuda in a December 2003 friendly match against Barbados and earned a total of 33 caps, scoring 10 goals. He represented his country in 13 FIFA World Cup qualification matches.

== Career statistics ==
=== International ===
Appearances and goals by national team and year
National team	Year	Apps	Goals
Bermuda	2003	1	0
Bermuda	2004	12	5
Bermuda	2006	4	2
Bermuda	2007	2	0
Bermuda	2008	5	0
Bermuda	2011	6	3
Bermuda	2012	3	0
Total		33	10

Scores and results list Bermuda's goal tally first, score column indicates score after each Smith goal.

List of international goals scored by Khano Smith
No.	Date	Venue	Opponent	Score	Result	Competition	Ref.
1	29 February 2004	Bermuda National Stadium, Hamilton, Bermuda	Montserrat	4–0	13–0	2006 FIFA World Cup qualification	
2	21 March 2004	Blakes Estate Stadium, Lookout, Montserrat	Montserrat	5–0	7–0	2006 FIFA World Cup qualification	
3	21 March 2004	Blakes Estate Stadium, Lookout, Montserrat	Montserrat	6–0	7–0	2006 FIFA World Cup qualification	
4	24 November 2004	Arnos Vale Stadium, Arnos Vale, Saint Vincent and the Grenadines	Cayman Islands	1–0	2–1	2005 Caribbean Cup qualification	
5	26 November 2004	Arnos Vale Stadium, Arnos Vale, Saint Vincent and the Grenadines	Saint Vincent and the Grenadines	1–1	3–3	2005 Caribbean Cup qualification	
6	21 November 2006	Barbados National Stadium, Saint Michael, Barbados	Bahamas	1–0	4–0	2007 Caribbean Cup qualification	
7	21 November 2006	Barbados National Stadium, Saint Michael, Barbados	Bahamas	3–0	4–0	2007 Caribbean Cup qualification	
8	6 September 2011	Providence Stadium, Providence, Guyana	Guyana	1–2	1–2	2014 FIFA World Cup qualification	
9	11 November 2011	Bermuda National Stadium, Hamilton, Bermuda	Barbados	1–1	2–1	2014 FIFA World Cup qualification	
10	14 November 2011	Kensington Oval, Bridgetown, Barbados	Barbados	2–0	2–1	2014 FIFA World Cup qualification	

== Managerial career ==
Smith was named assistant coach for Orlando Pride in the National Women's Soccer League in December 2015. On 18 December 2018, Smith joined the technical staff of expansion club Birmingham Legion FC ahead of their first season in the USL Championship.

Smith was announced as the first-ever head coach and general manager of Rhode Island FC on March 8, 2023. Smith coached Rhode Island FC to the 5th seed in the regular season, and a loss in the Championship Final in their first season as a club. They lost to the Colorado Springs Switchbacks 3-0 in the final.

== Honors ==
=== Dandy Town Hornets ===
- Cingular Wireless Premier Division Champion (1): 2004
- Bermuda Champions Cup (1): 2004–05

=== New England Revolution ===
- Lamar Hunt U.S. Open Cup (1): 2007
- North American SuperLiga (1): 2008

=== Individual ===
- Cingular Wireless Premier Division Top Scorer: 2005
