= Steve Ralston =

American soccer player

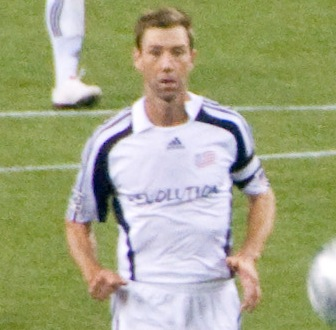
- Ralston playing for the New England Revolution in 2009

Personal information
- Date of birth: June 14, 1974 (age 52)
- Place of birth: St. Louis, Missouri, U.S.
- Height: 5 ft 9 in (1.75 m)
- Position: Midfielder

College career
| Years | Team | Apps | (Gls) |
| 1993–1995 | FIU Golden Panthers | | (40) |

Senior career*
| Years | Team | Apps | (Gls) |
| 1996–2001 | Tampa Bay Mutiny | 177 | (34) |
| 2002–2009 | New England Revolution | 201 | (42) |
| 2010 | AC St. Louis | 2 | (0) |
| 2010 | New England Revolution | 0 | (0) |
| Total | | 380 | (76) |

International career
| 1997–2007 | United States | 36 | (4) |

Managerial career
- 2010: AC St. Louis (assistant)
- 2010–2014: Houston Dynamo (assistant)
- 2015–2018: San Jose Earthquakes (assistant)
- 2018: San Jose Earthquakes (interim)
- 2022–: San Jose Earthquakes (assistant)
Medal record
Representing United States
| Winner | CONCACAF Gold Cup | 2005 |
| Winner | CONCACAF Gold Cup | 2007 |
| Third place | CONCACAF Gold Cup | 2003 |
Men's Soccer
- * Club domestic league appearances and goals

Steve Ralston (born June 14, 1974) is an American former soccer player and manager who played as a midfielder. He spent most of his playing career in Major League Soccer with the Tampa Bay Mutiny and the New England Revolution, retiring in 2010 as the league's all-time career leader in assists (135), appearances (378), starts (372), and minutes played (33,143). He also held the U.S. record for professional appearances (412) in 2010. In 2020, Major League Soccer selected Ralston as one of the greatest players in league history.

Ralston served as assistant manager at several teams, including the Houston Dynamo and San Jose Earthquakes, including a brief stint as the interim head coach at the Earthquakes in 2018.

== Club career ==
Ralston was drafted 18th overall in the 1996 MLS College Draft by the Tampa Bay Mutiny out of Florida International University, and quickly established himself as one of the best players in the league, starting 31 matches in the club's inaugural campaign, scoring seven goals and notching two assists, and concluding the year as the first player in MLS history to win the Rookie of the Year Award. He also helped the club lift the first-ever Supporters' Shield. In his second season, Ralston started 29 matches and scored five goals, adding 11 assists. He was named to the 1997 MLS All-Star team. He started 29 matches in 1998, again scoring five goals, and recording eight assists. In 1999, Ralston was voted Mutiny Team MVP, MLS Best XI, and won the MLS Fair Play Award. He started all 32 matches for the club, scoring five goals and recording a league-leading eighteen assists. In 2000, Ralston was named an MLS All-Star for the second time, won the MLS Fair Play Award for the second time, and finished second in the league in assists, with 17. In total, Ralston played for the Mutiny for six years, leaving only after the team was contracted in 2002. Ralston departed as the Mutiny as the club's all-time leader in games played (177) and points (130).

On January 11, 2002, Ralston was selected by the New England Revolution in the 2002 Allocation Draft. In his first year with the Revolution, Ralston led the league in assists with 19. He was named MLS Best XI for the second time, and an MLS All-Star for the third time. He helped the team reach the MLS Cup final for the first time, ultimately losing to the LA Galaxy on a Golden Goal in extra time.

Ralston was named an MLS All-Star in 2004, and won goal of the week twice - in week 15 and 19. He was subsequently a finalist for MLS Goal of the Year, and was named Revolution Team MVP. In 2006, Ralston was a finalist for the MLS Fair Play Award. He was again named an MLS All-Star in 2007, and led the league in assists, with 14. On July 14, 2007 against the New York Red Bulls, Ralston surpassed his former teammate Carlos Valderrama to become the MLS all-time leader in assists, with 115. In 2007 Ralston also helped the club win its first-ever silverware in the form of the 2007 U.S. Open Cup.

In 2008, Ralston was named MLS Player of the Week twice - in matchweeks four and five. He was named an MLS All-Star for the sixth time. He also won the Revolution team Golden Boot award, scoring eight goals and recording seven assists. That year he helped the club secure its second-ever piece of silverware, the 2008 North American SuperLiga, scoring in the final and converting a penalty during the subsequent shoot-out. In 2009 Ralston won the MLS Fair Play Award, and was named Revolution Humanitarian of the Year. He suffered a season-ending knee injury in September of the 2009 season.

Ralston's contract with the Revolution ended at the conclusion of the 2009 season, and he left the club to become the first-ever signing of new USSF Division 2 club AC St. Louis. Ralston was one of the team's starting midfielders, and an assistant coach to head coach Claude Anelka.

After AC St. Louis ran in to financial difficulties, Ralston agreed to leave by mutual consent and immediately joined up with his former club New England Revolution.

In Ralston's first appearance back with the New England Revolution, he suffered a left elbow dislocation. In July 2010, he announced his retirement.

Ralston ended his Major League Soccer career as the league's leader in minutes played (33,143), games started (372), appearances (378), and assists (135). In thirteen years in the league, he scored 76 goals and had 135 assists in 378 regular season matches, and added three goals and seven assists in 30 playoff matches. He also served as captain for several seasons with New England, from 2007-2009.

== International career ==
Ralston appeared for the United States national team 36 times over an 11-year span and scored 4 international goals. His first cap came on January 17, 1997, against Peru. His last was for the squad that won the 2007 CONCACAF Gold Cup. He was never selected to a World Cup roster.

Ralston had a break out year for the United States national team in 2005 by earning 15 caps. He scored the game-winning goal in a World Cup qualifying match against Mexico on September 3, 2005. The victory for the United States clinched qualification in the 2006 FIFA World Cup. Due to a later injury, he was only listed as an alternate for the United States at the World Cup.

== Coaching career ==
In July 2010, Ralston took an assistant coaching job at the Houston Dynamo with his former Mutiny teammate Dominic Kinnear. On January 6, 2015, the San Jose Earthquakes announced Ralston would join Kinnear in San Jose and once again serve as his assistant coach.

== Career statistics ==
=== International ===
Appearances and goals by national team and year
| National team | Year | Apps | Goals |
|---|---|---|---|
| United States | 1997 | 4 | 0 |
| United States | 1999 | 1 | 0 |
| United States | 2000 | 2 | 0 |
| United States | 2003 | 7 | 2 |
| United States | 2004 | 3 | 0 |
| United States | 2005 | 15 | 2 |
| United States | 2006 | 1 | 0 |
| United States | 2007 | 3 | 0 |
| Total | | 36 | 4 |

Scores and results list United States' goal tally first, score column indicates score after each Ralston goal.

List of international goals scored by Steve Ralston
| No. | Date | Venue | Opponent | Score | Result | Competition | Ref. |
|---|---|---|---|---|---|---|---|
| 1 | 18 January 2003 | Lockhart Stadium, Fort Lauderdale, United States | Canada | 4–0 | 4–0 | Friendly | |
| 2 | 19 July 2003 | Gillette Stadium, Foxborough, United States | Cuba | 3–0 | 5–0 | 2003 CONCACAF Gold Cup | |
| 3 | 30 March 2005 | Legion Field, Birmingham, United States | Guatemala | 2–0 | 2–0 | 2006 FIFA World Cup qualification | |
| 4 | 3 September 2005 | Columbus Crew Stadium, Columbus, United States | Mexico | 1–0 | 2–0 | 2006 FIFA World Cup qualification | |

== Honors ==
United States

- CONCACAF Gold Cup: 2005

New England Revolution

- U.S. Open Cup: 2007
- North American SuperLiga: 2008

Tampa Bay Mutiny

- Supporters' Shield: 1996

Individual

- MLS 50/50 Club
- MLS Rookie of the Year: 1996
- MLS All-Star: 1997, 2000, 2002 2004, 2007, 2008
- MLS Best XI (3): 1999, 2000, 2002
- MLS Fair Play Award (3): 1999, 2000, 2009
- MLS top assist provider: 1999, 2002, 2007
