= 2008 New England Revolution season =

New England Revolution
2008 season
- Owner: Robert Kraft
- Head coach: Steve Nicol
- MLS: Conference: 3rd Overall: 5th
- MLS Cup Playoffs: Conference Semifinals
- U.S. Open Cup: Semifinals
- Superliga: Champions
- Champions League: Preliminary round
- Top goalscorer: League: Ralston (8); All: Ralston (9)
- Average home league attendance: 17,580 (regular season); 5,221 (playoffs)
| Home colors | Away colors |

The 2008 New England Revolution season was the thirteenth season of the team's existence. The regular season began on March 29, 2008, with a 3–0 win over the Houston Dynamo and ended on November 6 with a 3–0 playoff loss to the Chicago Fire.

== Background ==
After losing a third straight MLS Cup final in 2007, the Revs began the 2008 season with high hopes. For the first time in team history, New England participated in four different competitions during the regular season. Their 2007 U.S. Open Cup had qualified them for the preliminary round of the inaugural CONCACAF Champions League, and their top-four finish qualified them for the 2008 North American SuperLiga. The Revs also played matches in the 2008 Open Cup and the 2008 regular season.

== Review ==
The club started the season well, reaching their July league-fixture recess at the top of the overall MLS table. This early-season success continued in the 2008 SuperLiga, which the club won on August 5, 2008, by beating their 2-time MLS Cup rival the Houston Dynamo on penalties. Injuries, fatigue, and fixture congestion eventually caught up with the Revs, however, and the team performed poorly after returning to MLS league play. In an effort to spell his regular starters, coach Steve Nicol started mostly reserves in an Open Cup semifinal against D.C. United. The Revs lost the match, and Nicol was widely criticized for the decision. The Revolution also crashed out of the CONCACAF Champions League, losing to regional minnows Joe Public FC of Trinidad and Tobago 6–1 on aggregate, including an embarrassing 4–0 defeat at Gillette Stadium.

Mostly on the strength of their hot start, the Revolution managed to make the playoffs. They were unable to advance, however, as they drew 0–0 at home and lost 3–0 away to the Chicago Fire.

== Squad ==
Adapted from 2024 New England Revolution Media Guide (pg. 236)

Note: Flags indicate national team as defined under FIFA eligibility rules; some limited exceptions apply. Players may hold more than one non-FIFA nationality.

| No. | Pos. | Nation | Player |
|---|---|---|---|
| 14 | MF | USA | Steve Ralston |
| 20 | FW | USA | Taylor Twellman |
| 7 | FW | USA | Adam Cristman |
| 11 | FW | ZIM | Kheli Dube |
| 13 | MF | USA | Jeff Larentowicz |
| 29 | FW | GAM | Kenny Mansally |
| 18 | MF | BER | Khano Smith |
| 31 | MF | GAM | Sainey Nyassi |
| 21 | MF | GRN | Shalrie Joseph |
| 16 | MF | HON | Mauricio Castro |
| 6 | DF | USA | Jay Heaps |
| 15 | DF | USA | Michael Parkhurst |
| 27 | MF | USA | Wells Thompson |
| 8 | DF | USA | Chris Tierney |

| No. | Pos. | Nation | Player |
|---|---|---|---|
| 3 | DF | USA | Chris Albright |
| 4 | DF | CRC | Gabriel Badilla |
| 23 | FW | CRC | Argenis Fernandez |
| 17 | DF / MF | USA | Gary Flood |
| 8 | MF | USA | Joe Franchino |
| 5 | MF | USA | Joe Germanese |
| 25 | DF | USA | Chase Hilgenbrinck |
| 2 | DF | USA | Amaechi Igwe |
| 28 | MF | USA | Pat Phelan |
| 1 | GK | USA | Matt Reis |
| 12 | GK | USA | Doug Warren |
| 34 | DF | USA | Sam Brill |
| 24 | GK | USA | Brad Knighton |
| 32 | MF | USA | Brandon Manzonelli |
| 30 | MF | USA | Brandon Tyler |
| 22 | DF | USA | Rob Valentino |

=== Transfers In ===
New England Revolution – 2008 Transfers In
| Name | Nationality | Position | Date | Method | Fee | Prior Club | Reference |
|---|---|---|---|---|---|---|---|
| Chris Albright | (United States) | DF | January 18 | "Acquired" | see note | (United States) LA Galaxy | |
| Rob Valentino | (United States) | DF | January 18 | 2008 MLS SuperDraft | N/A | (United States) San Jose Frogs | |
| Mike Videira | (United States) | MF | January 18 | 2008 MLS SuperDraft | N/A | Cary RailHawks U23's | |
| Joe Germanese | (United States) | DF | January 18 | 2008 MLS SuperDraft | N/A | (United States) Cary RailHawks U23's | |
| Matthew Britner | (Canada) | DF | January 18 | 2008 MLS SuperDraft | N/A | (United States) Brown Bears | |
| Spencer Wadsworth | (United States) | MF | January 18 | 2008 MLS SuperDraft | N/A | (United States) Duke University | |
| Kheli Dube | (Zimbabwe) | FW | January 24 | 2008 MLS Supplemental Draft | N/A | (United States) Michigan Bucks | |
| Chris Tierney | (United States) | DF | January 24 | 2008 MLS Supplemental Draft | N/A | (United States) Virginia Cavaliers men's soccer | |
| Kyle Altman | (United States) | MF | January 24 | 2008 MLS Supplemental Draft | N/A | (United States) DFW Tornados | |
| Saidi Isaac | ?? | FW | January 24 | 2008 MLS Supplemental Draft | N/A | (United States) Winthrop Eagles | |
| Mauricio Castro | (Honduras) | MF | February 18 | Transfer | Undisclosed | (Honduras) Olimipia | |
| Argenis Fernandez | (Costa Rica) | FW | March 11 | Transfer | Undisclosed | (Costa Rica) Santos de Guapiles | |
| Chase Hilgenbrinck | (United States) | DF | March 28 | Free Agent | N/A | (Chile) Ñublense | |
| Pat Phelan | (United States) | MF | June 4 | Trade | See note | (Canada) Toronto FC | |
| Gabriel Badilla | (Costa Rica) | DF | August 18 | Transfer | Undisclosed | (Costa Rica) Deportivo Saprissa | |

=== Transfers Out ===
New England Revolution – 2008 Transfers Out
| Name | Nationality | Position | Date | Method | Fee | Next Club | Reference |
|---|---|---|---|---|---|---|---|
| Andy Dorman | (Wales) | MF | January 3 | Transfer | Undisclosed | (Scotland) St Mirren F.C. | |
| Pat Noonan | (United States) | FW | January 24 | Transfer | Undisclosed | (Norway) Aalesunds FK | |
| Joe Franchino | (United States) | MF | April 18 | Trade | See note | (United States) LA Galaxy | |
| Chase Hilgenbrinck | (United States) | DF | July 14 | Retired | N/A | N/A | |
| Adam Cristman | (United States) | FW | November 24 | Trade | See note | (United States) Kansas City Wizards | |
| Khano Smith | (Bermuda) | MF | November 26 | 2008 MLS Expansion Draft | N/A | (United States) New York Red Bulls | |
| Doug Warren | (United States) | GK | November 26 | Waived | N/A | N/A | |
| Jose Angulo | (Colombia) | FW | November 26 | Waived | N/A | (United States) Newark Ironbound Express | |
| Michael Parkhurst | (United States) | DF | December 9 | Transferred | Undisclosed | (Denmark) FC Nordsjælland | |

=== Notes ===
1. .Albright was acquired from the LA Galaxy in exchange for allocation money.
2. . On June 4, the Revolution acquired Pat Phelan from Toronto FC in exchange for roster considerations.
3. . The Revolution traded Franchino to the LA Galaxy for a second round pick in the 2009 MLS SuperDraft.
4. . The Revolution traded Adam Cristman to the Kansas City Wizards in exchange for allocation money and a third-round pick in the 2009 MLS SuperDraft.
5. . On August 6 Pat Noonan re-signed with MLS and was traded to the Columbus Crew in exchange for allocation money, the Crew’s natural first-round selection in the 2009 MLS SuperDraft and allocation table considerations.

=== Honors ===
Adapted from 2024 Media Guide (pg. 326–328)

New England Revolution – 2008 League and team awards
| Award | Name |
|---|---|
| MLS Goalkeeper of the Year | Matt Reis (Finalist) |
| MLS Rookie of the Year | Kheli Dube (Finalist) |
| MLS Fair Play Award (Individual) | Michael Parkhurst |
| MLS Fair Play Award (Team) | New England Revolution |
| MLS Player of the Week | Steve Ralston (Week 14, Week 25) Adam Cristman (Week 15) |
| MLS All-Stars | Shalrie Joseph, Michael Parkhurst, Steve Ralston, Matt Reis |
| MLS Goal of the Week | Sainey Nyassi (Week 1 vs. HOU) |
| Team Most Valuable Player | Steve Ralston |
| Team Defender of the Year | Michael Parkhurst |
| Team Humanitarian of the Year | Adam Cristman |
| Team Golden Boot | Steve Ralston (8g 7a) |

== Match results ==
Win Tie Loss

=== Friendlies ===
The Revolution played preseason matches in Cancun, Bermuda, and New Orleans, with a 4-1-1 record. On March 6, the Revolution played a match against CF Atlante in Playa del Carmen.

| March 15, 2008 | New England Revolution | v | Bermuda |
| | | Report |

| March 19, 2008 | New England Revolution | 2–0 | Bermuda |
| | | Report |

| March 6, 2008 | CF Atlante | 1–0 | New England Revolution | Playa del Carmen |
| | | , |

| March 6, 2008 | Pioneros de Cancun | 1–4 | New England Revolution | Playa del Carmen |

| March 14, 2008 | New England Revolution | v | C.D. Marathón | New Orleans, Louisiana |
| | | https://www.newspapers.com/article/the-boston-globe-revolution-get-superlig/143311114/, https://www.newspapers.com/article/the-boston-globe-they-stood-together-on/163071948/ | | Stadium: Tad Gormley Stadium |
Note: Game was a 60-minute, closed-door scrimmage

| March 16, 2008 | New England Revolution | 0-0 | C.D. Marathón | New Orleans, Louisiana |
| | | https://www.newspapers.com/article/the-boston-globe-revolution-get-superlig/143311114/, https://www.newspapers.com/article/the-boston-globe-they-stood-together-on/163071948/ | | Stadium: Tad Gormley Stadium; Attendance: 4,500 |

=== MLS regular season ===
| March 29, 2008 1 | New England Revolution | 3–0 | Houston Dynamo | Foxborough, Massachusetts, United States |
| 7:30 PM EDT | Ralston 15'; Cristman 32'; Nyassi 92+' | (report) | Mulrooney (yellow card) 58' | Stadium: Gillette Stadium; Attendance: 11,116; Referee: Michael Kennedy |

| April 3, 2008 2 | Chicago Fire | 4–0 | New England Revolution | Chicago, Illinois, United States |
| 7:00 PM CDT | Barrett 4' (yellow card) 50'; Mapp (yellow card) 17'; Frankowski 22' 39'; Blanco 37'; Gutierrez (yellow card) 89' | (report) | Larentowicz (red card) 7'; Joseph (yellow card) 7' | Stadium: Toyota Park; Attendance: 15,553; Referee: Baldomero Toledo |

| April 09, 2008 3 | Kansas City Wizards | 1–3 | New England Revolution | Kansas City, Missouri United States |
| 7:00 PM CDT | | (report) | | Stadium: CommunityAmerica Ballpark; Attendance: 8,096; Referee: Terry Vaughn |

| April 12, 2010 4 | New England Revolution | 0–1 | Colorado Rapids | Foxborough, Massachusetts, United States |
| 7:30 PM EDT | Amaechi Igwe (yellow card) 18' | Report | Kosuke Kimura (yellow card) 39'; Facundo Erpen (yellow card) 67'; Nick LaBrocca 68'; Terry Cooke (yellow card) 79'; Colin Clark (yellow card) 90+4' | Stadium: Gillette Stadium; Referee: Mark Geiger |

| April 19, 2008 5 | New York Red Bulls | 1–1 | New England Revolution | East Rutherford, New Jersey United States |
| 7:30 PM EDT | Siniša Ubiparipović (yellow card) 9'; Jozy Altidore 30'; Kevin Goldthwaite (yellow card) 49' | Report | Mauricio Castro (red card) 48'; Jeff Larentowicz 56'; Amaechi Igwe (yellow card) 90+2' | Stadium: Giants Stadium; Attendance: 12,047 |

| April 24, 2008 6 | FC Dallas | 0–1 | New England Revolution | Frisco, Texas, United States |
| 7:30 PM CDT | Arturo Álvarez (yellow card) 85' | Report | Wells Thompson (yellow card) 59'; Khano Smith 72' (yellow card) 90' | Stadium: Pizza Hut Park; Attendance: 10,453; Referee: Alex Prus |

| May 3, 2008 7 | New England Revolution | 0–3 | Chicago Fire | Foxborough, Massachusetts, United States |
| 7:30 PM EDT | | Report | Chris Rolfe 29'; John Thorrington 50'; Stephen King 77' | Stadium: Gillette Stadium; Attendance: 10,858; Referee: Jair Marrufo |

| May 11, 2008 8 | Chivas USA | 1–2 | New England Revolution | Carson, California, United States |
| 12:00 PM PDT | Jesse Marsch (yellow card) 19'; Atiba Harris (yellow card) 75'; Daniel Paladini (yellow card) 76'; Justin Braun 90+3' | Report | Abdoulie Mansally 18'; Jeff Larentowicz (yellow card) 30'; Taylor Twellman 59' | Stadium: Home Depot Center; Attendance: 10,927; Referee: Mark Geiger |

| May 17, 2008 9 | New England Revolution | 2–0 | San Jose Earthquakes | Foxborough, Massachusetts, United States |
| 7:30 PM EDT | Kheli Dube 6'; Jay Heaps (yellow card) 36'; Jeff Larentowicz (yellow card) 72' | Report | Eric Denton (yellow card) 55'; Ramiro Corrales (yellow card) 82'; Ryan Johnson (yellow card) 90+3' | Stadium: Gillette Stadium; Attendance: 13,004; Referee: Terry Vaughn |

| May 24, 2008 10 | Columbus Crew | 0–1 | New England Revolution | Columbus, Ohio, United States |
| 7:30 PM EDT | Frankie Hejduk (yellow card) 42'; Ezra Hendrickson (yellow card) 90'; Chad Marshall (yellow card) 90+2' | Report | Sainey Nyassi (yellow card) 48'; Kheli Dube 90' | Stadium: Columbus Crew Stadium; Attendance: 15,621; Referee: Richard Heron |

| May 29, 2008 11 | New England Revolution | 2–2 | D.C. United | Foxborough, Massachusetts, United States |
| 7:30 PM EDT | Wells Thompson (yellow card) 25'; Adam Cristman 59'; Kheli Dube 72'; Sainey Nyassi (yellow card) 78' | Report | Luciano Emilio 15'; Santino Quaranta (yellow card) 34'; Fred Da Silva 53'; Gonzalo Martínez (yellow card) 75' | Stadium: Gillette Stadium; Attendance: 8,159; Referee: Abbey Okulaja |

| June 6, 2008 12 | New England Revolution | 2–1 | FC Dallas | Foxborough, Massachusetts, United States |
| 6:30 PM EDT | Adam Cristman 5'; Steve Ralston 22'; Kheli Dube (yellow card) 48'; Jay Heaps (yellow card) 70' | Report | Drew Moor (yellow card) 21'; Duilio Davino (yellow card) 21'; Guerreiro Andre Rocha (yellow card) 24'; Bobby Rhine (yellow card) 51'; Arturo Álvarez 90' | Stadium: Gillette Stadium; Attendance: 54,045; Referee: Michael Kennedy |

| June 12, 2008 13 | Houston Dynamo | 0–2 | New England Revolution | Houston, Texas, United States |
| 8:00 PM CDT | Ricardo Clark (yellow card) 72'; Geoff Cameron (yellow card) 74' | | Steve Ralston 8'; Kheli Dube 35'; Jeff Larentowicz (yellow card) 81' | Stadium: Robertson Stadium; Attendance: 14,655; Referee: Mark Geiger |

| June 18, 2008 14 | New England Revolution | 1–1 | New York Red Bulls | Foxborough, Massachusetts, United States |
| 7:30 PM EDT | Sainey Nyassi (yellow card) 55'; Jeff Larentowicz (yellow card) 57'; Steve Ralston 79' | Report | Siniša Ubiparipović (yellow card) 30'; Seth Stammler 37' (yellow card) 53' | Stadium: Gillette Stadium; Attendance: 10,596; Referee: Joe Caroccio |

| June 21, 2008 15 | Real Salt Lake | 2–1 | New England Revolution | Salt Lake City, Utah, United States |
| 7:30 PM MDT | Jay Heaps 11' (o.g.) (yellow card) 20'; Tino Nuñez 60'; Kyle Beckerman (yellow card) 76' | Report | Adam Cristman 8'; Steve Ralston (yellow card) 66' | Stadium: Rice-Eccles Stadium; Attendance: 11,965; Referee: Kevin Stott |

| June 28, 2008 16 | New England Revolution | 2–1 | Toronto FC | Foxborough, Massachusetts, United States |
| 7:30 PM EDT | Steve Ralston 12' 52'; Jeff Larentowicz (yellow card) 90+3' | Report | Laurent Robert (yellow card) 45+2'; Maurice Edu (yellow card) 77' (goal) 78'; Tyrone Marshall (yellow card) 85' | Stadium: Gillette Stadium; Attendance: 15,863; Referee: Tim Weyland |

| July 4, 2008 17 | Los Angeles Galaxy | 1–2 | New England Revolution | Carson, California, United States |
| PDT | David Beckham 66'; Álvaro Pires (yellow card) 81' | Report | Adam Cristman 33' 37' | Stadium: Home Depot Center; Attendance: 27,000; Referee: Jorge Gonzalez |

| August 9, 2008 18 | New England Revolution | 1–2 | Chicago Fire | Foxborough, Massachusetts, United States |
| 7:30 PM EDT | Taylor Twellman 3'; Shalrie Joseph (yellow card) 58' (red card) 74'; Sainey Nyassi (yellow card) 69'; Matt Reis (yellow card) 86'; Steve Ralston (yellow card) 87' | Report | Gonzalo Segares (yellow card) 64' (goal) 81'; Marco Pappa (yellow card) 77'; Wilman Conde 86' | Stadium: Gillette Stadium; Attendance: 19,240; Referee: Kevin Scott |

| August 16, 2008 19 | San Jose Earthquakes | 4–0 | New England Revolution | San Jose, California, United States |
| 7:00 PM EDT | Ronnie O'Brien 11' (yellow card) 79' (goal) 87'; Eric Denton (yellow card) 35'; Nick Garcia (yellow card) 39'; Ryan Johnson 71'; Scott Sealy 76' | Report | Chris Tierney (yellow card) 16'; Khano Smith (yellow card) 70' | Stadium: Buck Shaw Stadium; Attendance: 9,859; Referee: Shane Moody |

| August 20, 2008 20 | New England Revolution | 2–1 | D.C. United | Foxborough, Massachusetts, United States |
| 7:30 PM EDT | Taylor Twellman 24'; Jeff Larentowicz 49'; Sainey Nyassi (yellow card) 70' | Report | Clyde Simms (yellow card) 21'; Marc Burch (yellow card) 64'; Jaime Moreno 69' (yellow card) 85' | Stadium: Gillette Stadium; Attendance: 14,964; Referee: Abbey Okulaja |

| August 23, 2008 21 | Toronto FC | 1–1 | New England Revolution | Toronto, Ontario, Canada |
| 7:30 PM | Chad Barrett 66' | Report | Taylor Twellman 35' | Stadium: BMO Field; Attendance: 20,461; Referee: Michael Kennedy |

| August 30, 2008 22 | New England Revolution | 2–2 | Los Angeles Galaxy | Foxborough, Massachusetts, United States |
| 7:30 PM EDT | Wells Thompson (yellow card) 14'; Taylor Twellman 22'; Shalrie Joseph 71'; Jay Heaps (yellow card) 90+1' | Report | Eddie Lewis (yellow card) 14'; Landon Donovan 34' 55'; Greg Vanney (yellow card) 63' | Stadium: Gillette Stadium; Attendance: 39,256; Referee: Tim Weyland |

| September 6, 2008 23 | Columbus Crew | 4–0 | New England Revolution | Columbus, Ohio, United States |
| 7:30 PM EDT | Guillermo Barros Schelotto 40'; Andy Iro 45+1'; Jason Garey 67' (yellow card) 83' (goal) 90' | Report | Chris Albright (yellow card) 23'; Shalrie Joseph (yellow card) 50'; Amaechi Igwe (yellow card) 59' | Stadium: Columbus Crew Stadium; Attendance: 16,918; Referee: Mark Geiger |

| September 11, 2008 24 | New England Revolution | 4–0 | Chivas USA | Foxborough, Massachusetts, United States |
| 7:00 PM EDT | Chris Albright (yellow card) 28'; Steve Ralston (yellow card) 20' (goal) 90+3'; Taylor Twellman 53'; Jeff Larentowicz 83'; Khano Smith 90+1' | Report | Ante Razov (yellow card) 43'; Francisco Mendoza (yellow card) 79' | Stadium: Gillette Stadium; Attendance: 7,606; Referee: Jair Marrufo |

| September 20, 2008 25 | Colorado Rapids | 1–1 | New England Revolution | Commerce City, Colorado, United States |
| 7:00 PM CDT | Colin Clark 4' (yellow card) 56'; Cory Gibbs (yellow card) 5'; Mehdi Ballouchy (yellow card) 49' | Report | Abdoulie Mansally 50' | Stadium: Dick's Sporting Goods Park; Attendance: 12,223; Referee: Michael Kennedy |

| September 27, 2008 26 | New England Revolution | 0–1 | Columbus Crew | Foxborough, Massachusetts, United States |
| 7:30 PM EDT | Shalrie Joseph (yellow card) 90+4' | Report | Frankie Hejduk (yellow card) 6' (red card) 65'; Chad Marshall 35'; Will Hesmer (yellow card) 90+2' | Stadium: Gillette Stadium; Attendance: 15,035; Referee: Terry Vaughn |

| October 4, 2008 27 | New England Revolution | 2–2 | Real Salt Lake | Foxborough, Massachusetts, United States |
| 7:30 PM EDT | Sainey Nyassi (yellow card) 9'; Khano Smith (yellow card) 18'; Steve Ralston 77'; Taylor Twellman 79'; Jay Heaps (yellow card) 90+2' | Report | Javier Morales 13' (yellow card) 16'; Ian Joy (yellow card) 22'; Andy Williams 73' (yellow card) 90+1' | Stadium: Gillette Stadium; Attendance: 18,893; Referee: Baldomero Toledo |

| October 11, 2008 28 | Kansas City Wizards | 1–0 | New England Revolution | Kansas City, Kansas, United States |
| 7:00 PM CDT | Jimmy Conrad 61'; Abe Thompson (yellow card) 72' | Report | Gabriel Badilla (yellow card) 69' | Stadium: CommunityAmerica Ballpark; Attendance: 9,488; Referee: Alex Pruss |

| October 16, 2008 29 | D.C. United | 2–1 | New England Revolution | Washington, D.C., United States |
| 8:00 PM EDT | Santino Quaranta (yellow card) 28'; Francis Doe 63' 80'; Fred (yellow card) 90+2' | Report | Mauricio Castro (yellow card) 59'; Jeff Larentowicz (yellow card) 56'; Chris Albright (yellow card) 82' Sainey Nyassi (yellow card) 88' | Stadium: RFK Stadium; Attendance: 16,672; Referee: Tim Weyland |

| October 25, 2008 30 | New England Revolution | 3–1 | Kansas City Wizards | Foxborough, Massachusetts, United States |
| 7:30 PM EDT | Gabriel Badilla (red card) 26'; Khano Smith (red card) 42'; Shalrie Joseph (yellow card) 43'; Jeff Larentowicz 90' | Report | Claudio Lopez 28'; Davy Arnaud 53'; Michael Parkhurst 88' (o.g.) | Stadium: Gillette Stadium; Attendance: 16,764; Referee: Kevin Scott |

=== Open Cup ===
| July 1, 2008 Third round | New England Revolution | 3–0 | Richmond Kickers | New Britain, Connecticut, United States |
| 7:00 PM EDT | Brill 46'; Germanese 63'; Twellman 67' | (report) | | Stadium: Veteran's Memorial Stadium; Attendance: 3,950; Referee: Tony Russo |

| July 8, 2008 Quarterfinals | New England Revolution | 1–1 (5-3 p) | Crystal Palace Baltimore | New Britain, Connecticut, United States |
| 7:00 PM EDT | Mansally 6'; Igwe (yellow card) 33'; Hilgenbrinck (yellow card) 59' | (report) | Lader 20'; Teixeira (yellow card) 78'; Harkin (yellow card) 109'; Flores (red card) 119' | Stadium: Veteran's Memorial Stadium; Attendance: 2,590; Referee: Hilario Grajeda |
| | Penalties |
| | Hilgenbrinck (penalty scored); Dube (penalty scored); Tierney (penalty scored); Igwe (penalty scored); Castro (penalty scored) | | (penalty scored) Harada; (penalty scored) Harkin; (penalty scored) Mbuta; (penalty missed) Teixeira |

| August 12, 2008 Semifinals | D.C. United | 3–1 | New England Revolution | Washington, D.C., United States |
| 7:30 PM EDT | Emilio 4' 81'; Quaranta 48'; McTavish (yellow card) 50' | (report) | Germanese 34'; Igwe (yellow card) 38'; Thompson (red card) 71' | Stadium: RFK Stadium; Attendance: 6,797; Referee: Jorge Gonzalez |

=== SuperLiga ===
| July 14, 2008 Group B | New England Revolution (United States) | 1–0 | (Mexico) Santos Laguna | Foxborough, Massachusetts, United States |
| 8:00 PM EDT | Dube 70' | (report) | Rodriguez (red card) 40' | Stadium: Gillette Stadium; Attendance: 10,118; Referee: Enrico Wijngaarde |

| July 16, 2008 Group B | New England Revolution (United States) | 1–0 | (Mexico) Pachuca | Foxborough, Massachusetts, United States |
| 8:00 PM EDT | Smith 96+' (pen.) | (report) | | Stadium: Gillette Stadium; Attendance: 9,614; Referee: Walter Quesada |

| July 20, 2008 Group B | Chivas USA (United States) | 1–1 | (United States) New England Revolution | Fullerton, California, United States |
| 5:00 PM PDT | Razov 59' | (report) | Joseph 78' | Stadium: Titan Stadium; Attendance: 4,738; Referee: Abiodun Okulaja |

| July 30, 2008 Semifinal | New England Revolution (United States) | 1–0 | (Mexico) Puebla | Foxborough, Massachusetts, United States |
| 8:00 PM EDT | Joseph 30'; Heaps (red card) 90+' | (report) | Rey (red card) 85'; Zamora (yellow card) 90+' (red card); Vilar (yellow card) 90+' (red card); Muñoz (red card) 90+'; Venegas (red card) 90+' | Stadium: Gillette Stadium; Attendance: 8,302; Referee: Carlos Batres |

| August 5, 2008 Final | (United States) New England Revolution | 2–2 (6–5 p) | (United States) Houston Dynamo | Foxborough, Massachusetts, United States |
| 8:00 EDT | Ralston 41'; Joseph (yellow card) 82', (goal) 102' | Report | Davis (yellow card) 14'; Jaqua 18'; Kamara 98' | Stadium: Gillette Stadium; Attendance: 9,242; Referee: Howard Webb |
| | Penalties |
| | Ralston (penalty scored); Reis (penalty missed); Joseph (penalty scored); Twellman (penalty scored); Smith (penalty missed); Larentowicz (penalty scored); Tierney (penalty scored); Albright (penalty scored) | | (penalty scored) Waibel; (penalty scored) Wondolowski; (penalty missed) De Rosario; (penalty missed) Ching; (penalty scored) Clark; (penalty scored) Barrett; (penalty scored) Kamara; (penalty missed) Ashe |

=== Champions League ===
| August 26, 2008 Preliminary round | Joe Public (Trinidad and Tobago) | 2–1 | (United States) New England Revolution | Macoya, Trinidad and Tobago |
| 9:00 EDT | Richardson 50'; Gay 70' | | Castro 76' (pen.) | Stadium: Marvin Lee Stadium; Attendance: 2,100; Referee: Courtney Campbell |

| September 2, 2008 Preliminary round | New England Revolution (United States) | 0–4 | (Trinidad and Tobago) Joe Public | Foxborough, Massachusetts, United States |
| 8:00 EDT | | | Richardson 17' 45' 81'; Nelson 48' | Stadium: Gillette Stadium; Attendance: 4,000; Referee: Steven Depiero |

=== Playoffs ===
| October 30, 2008 Conference Semifinals | New England Revolution | 0–0 | Chicago Fire | Foxborough, Massachusetts, United States |
| 8:00 PM EDT | | Report | | Stadium: Gillette Stadium; Attendance: 5,221; Referee: Alex Prus |

| November 6, 2008 Conference Semifinals | Chicago Fire | 3–0 | New England Revolution | Bridgeview, Illinois, United States |
| 7:45 PM CDT | Thorrington (yellow card) 36'; Rolfe 47+'; Conde 49'; Busch (yellow card) 62'; Segares 74' | (report) | Albright (red card) 83'; Igwe (yellow card) 47'; Joseph (yellow card) 53' | Stadium: Toyota Park; Attendance: 17,312; Referee: Jair Marrufo |

== Standings ==
Conference

| Pos | Team | Pld | W | L | T | GF | GA | GD | Pts | Qualification |
|---|---|---|---|---|---|---|---|---|---|---|
| 1 | Columbus Crew | 30 | 17 | 7 | 6 | 50 | 36 | +14 | 57 | MLS Cup Playoffs |
| 2 | Chicago Fire | 30 | 13 | 10 | 7 | 44 | 33 | +11 | 46 | MLS Cup Playoffs |
| 3 | New England Revolution | 30 | 12 | 11 | 7 | 40 | 43 | −3 | 43 | MLS Cup Playoffs |
| 4 | Kansas City Wizards | 30 | 11 | 10 | 9 | 37 | 39 | −2 | 42 | MLS Cup Playoffs |
| 5 | New York Red Bulls | 30 | 10 | 11 | 9 | 42 | 48 | −6 | 39 | MLS Cup Playoffs |
| 6 | D.C. United | 30 | 11 | 15 | 4 | 43 | 51 | −8 | 37 | |
| 7 | Toronto FC | 30 | 9 | 13 | 8 | 34 | 43 | −9 | 35 | |

Source: MLS

Overall

| Pos | Team | Pld | W | L | T | GF | GA | GD | Pts | Qualification |
|---|---|---|---|---|---|---|---|---|---|---|
| 1 | Columbus Crew (C, S) | 30 | 17 | 7 | 6 | 50 | 36 | +14 | 57 | CONCACAF Champions League |
| 2 | Houston Dynamo | 30 | 13 | 5 | 12 | 45 | 32 | +13 | 51 | CONCACAF Champions League |
| 3 | Chicago Fire | 30 | 13 | 10 | 7 | 44 | 33 | +11 | 46 | North American SuperLiga |
| 4 | Chivas USA | 30 | 12 | 11 | 7 | 40 | 41 | −1 | 43 | North American SuperLiga |
| 5 | New England Revolution | 30 | 12 | 11 | 7 | 40 | 43 | −3 | 43 | North American SuperLiga |
| 6 | Kansas City Wizards | 30 | 11 | 10 | 9 | 37 | 39 | −2 | 42 | North American SuperLiga |
| 7 | Real Salt Lake | 30 | 10 | 10 | 10 | 40 | 39 | +1 | 40 | |
| 8 | New York Red Bulls | 30 | 10 | 11 | 9 | 42 | 48 | −6 | 39 | CONCACAF Champions League |
| 9 | Colorado Rapids | 30 | 11 | 14 | 5 | 44 | 45 | −1 | 38 | |
| 10 | D.C. United | 30 | 11 | 15 | 4 | 43 | 51 | −8 | 37 | CONCACAF Champions League |
| 11 | FC Dallas | 30 | 8 | 10 | 12 | 45 | 41 | +4 | 36 | |
| 12 | Toronto FC | 30 | 9 | 13 | 8 | 34 | 43 | −9 | 35 | CONCACAF Champions League (Note: As winners of the 2009 Canadian Championship) |
| 13 | LA Galaxy | 30 | 8 | 13 | 9 | 55 | 62 | −7 | 33 | |
| 14 | San Jose Earthquakes | 30 | 8 | 13 | 9 | 32 | 38 | −6 | 33 | |

Source: MLS
Rules for classification: 1) points; 2) head-to-head record; 3) goal difference; 4) number of goals scored
(C) Champions; (S) Supporters' Shield
