= 2007 New England Revolution season =

New England Revolution
2007 season
- Owner: Robert Kraft
- Coach: Steve Nicol
- Major League Soccer: 2nd East; 4th Overall
- Playoffs: Finals
- U.S. Open Cup: Champions
- Top goalscorer: League: Twellman (16); All: Twellman (20)
- Average home league attendance: 16,742 (regular season); 10,217 (playoffs)
Home colors	Away colors

The 2007 New England Revolution season was the twelfth season of the team's existence, and the third straight season to end in the MLS Cup Final. It began on April 7 with a 1–0 road loss against the Chicago Fire and ended on November 19 with a 2–1 loss to the Houston Dynamo in the finals of the MLS Cup, a repeat of the previous year's MLS Cup Final. It was the first season where the Revs won any domestic competition, as they were the 2007 U.S. Open Cup champions. To date, this is the only tournament trophy won in club history, and the last trophy won until the 2021 Supporters' Shield.

== Squad ==
=== First-team squad ===
As of October 13, 2007. Note: Flags indicate national team as defined under FIFA eligibility rules; some limited exceptions apply. Players may hold more than one non-FIFA nationality.

No.	Pos.	Nation	Player
1	GK	USA	Matt Reis
2	DF	USA	Amaechi Igwe
4	DF	TRI	Avery John
5	FW	GHA	Willie Sims
6	DF	USA	Jay Heaps
7	FW	USA	Adam Cristman
8	MF	USA	Joe Franchino
11	FW	USA	Pat Noonan
12	GK	USA	Doug Warren
13	MF	USA	Jeff Larentowicz
14	MF	USA	Steve Ralston (Captain)
15	DF	USA	Michael Parkhurst
16	DF	USA	James Riley
17	DF	USA	Gary Flood

No.	Pos.	Nation	Player
18	FW	BER	James Riley
19	DF	USA	Kyle Helton
20	FW	USA	Taylor Twellman
21	MF	GRN	Shalrie Joseph (Vice-Captain)
22	DF	USA	Marshall Leonard
23	MF	USA	Miguel Gonzalez
24	GK	USA	Brad Knighton
25	DF	WAL	Andy Dorman
26	MF	IRL	Bryan Byrne
27	DF	USA	Wells Thompson
28	MF	USA	Chris Loftus
29	FW	GAM	Kenny Mansally
31	MF	GAM	Sainey Nyassi

=== Transfers ===
==== In ====
No.	Pos.	Nat.	Name	Age	Moving from	Type	Transfer window	Ends	Transfer fee	Source
27	DF	(United States)	Wells Thompson	23	(United States) Carolina Dynamo	Superdraft	Pre-season	Undisclosed		
2	DF	(United States)	Amaechi Igwe	18	(United States) Santa Clara Broncos	Superdraft	Pre-season	Undisclosed		
26	MF	(Republic of Ireland)	Bryan Byrne	26	(United States) San Fernando Valley Quakes	Superdraft	Pre-season	Undisclosed		
7	FW	(United States)	Adam Cristman	22	University of Virginia	Superdraft	Pre-season	Undisclosed		
19	DF	(United States)	Kyle Helton	21	(United States) Augusta Fireball	Loan Superdraft	Pre-season	Undisclosed		
70	FW	(United States)	Gary Flood	22	Hofstra University	MLS Supplemental Draft	Pre-season	Undisclosed		
11	FW	(The Gambia)	Sainey Nyassi	18	(The Gambia) Gambia Ports Authority	Free Transfer	Mid-season	Undisclosed	Undisclosed	
11	FW	(The Gambia)	Kenny Mansally	18	(The Gambia) Real de Banjul	Free Transfer	Mid-season	Undisclosed	Undisclosed	

==== Out ====
No.	Pos.	Nat.	Name	Age	Moving to	Type	Transfer window	Transfer fee	Source
27	MF	(Czech Republic)	Jani Galik	23	(United States) Harrisburg City Islanders	Option Declined	Pre-season		
26	MF	(United States)	Adam Williamson	23	(Canada) Wilmington Hammerheads	Option Declined	Pre-season		
23	MF	(United States)	Danny Wynn	23		Option Declined	Pre-season		
7	FW	(Uruguay)	José Cancela	30	(Canada) Toronto FC	Expansion Draft	Pre-season		
30	FW	(Mexico)	José Manuel Abundis	33	(Mexico) Querétaro F.C.	Option Declined	Pre-season		
2	FW	(United States)	Clint Dempsey	23	(England) Fulham F.C.	Transfer	Pre-season	$4,000,000	
17	FW	(United States)	Kyle Brown	23	(United States) Real Salt Lake	Trade	Pre-season		
19	DF	(New Zealand)	Tony Lochhead	25	(New Zealand) Wellington Phoenix	Waived	Pre-season		
3	MF	(United States)	Daniel Hernández	30	(Mexico) Club Puebla	Waived	Mid-season		
32	DF	(Ivory Coast)	Arsène Oka	23	(United States) Portland Timbers	Released	Mid-season		

== Club ==
=== Management ===
Position	Staff
Director of Soccer	(United States) Mike Burns
Head Coach	(Scotland) Steve Nicol
Assistant Coach	(England) Paul Mariner
Goalkeeper Coach	(Wales) Gwynne Williams
Head Athletic trainer	(United States) Wayne Penniman
Equipment manager	(United States) Brian Banfill

Last updated: October 13, 2007

=== Other information ===
Owner	(United States) Robert Kraft
Ground (capacity and dimensions)	Gillette Stadium (68,756 / N/A)

Source: New England Revolution

== Standings ==
=== Major League Soccer ===
==== Eastern Conference ====
Pos	Team	Pld	W	L	T	GF	GA	GD	Pts	Qualification
1	D.C. United	30	16	7	7	56	34	+22	55	MLS Cup Playoffs
2	New England Revolution	30	14	8	8	51	43	+8	50	MLS Cup Playoffs
3	New York Red Bulls	30	12	11	7	47	45	+2	43	MLS Cup Playoffs
4	Chicago Fire	30	10	10	10	31	36	−5	40	MLS Cup Playoffs
5	Kansas City Wizards	30	11	12	7	45	45	0	40	MLS Cup Playoffs
6	Columbus Crew	30	9	11	10	39	44	−5	37	
7	Toronto FC	30	6	17	7	25	49	−24	25	

Source: MLS

==== Results ====
Overall								Home						Away					
Pld	Pts	W	L	T	GF	GA	GD	W	L	T	GF	GA	GD	W	L	T	GF	GA	GD
30	50	14	8	8	51	43	+8	8	3	4	32	21	+11	6	5	4	19	22	−3

Last updated: October 21, 2007
Pld = Matches played; Pts = Points; W = Matches won; T = Matches tied; L = Matches lost; GF = Goals for; GA = Goals against; GD = Goal difference

Round	1	2	3	4	5	6	7	8	9	10	11	12	13	14	15	16	17	18	19	20	21	22	23	24	25	26	27	28	29	30
Stadium	A	H	A	A	A	H	A	A	H	H	H	H	A	H	A	H	A	H	A	H	H	H	A	A	H	A	H	A	H	A
Result	L	W	T	W	T	W	W	W	L	T	T	W	L	T	W	T	W	W	L	W	L	W	W	L	W	T	W	L	L	T

Source: New England Revolution
A = Away; H = Home; W = Win; L = Loss; T = Tie

== Matches ==
Win Tie Loss

=== MLS regular season ===
April 7, 2007 1	Chicago Fire	1–0	New England Revolution	Bridgeview, Illinois
	Pause 4'; Barrett (yellow card) 28'; Carr (yellow card) 90+3'	Report	Dorman (yellow card) 61'; Larentowicz (yellow card) 84'	Stadium: Toyota Park; Attendance: 15,153; Referee: Baldomero Toledo

April 14, 2007 2	New England Revolution	4–0	Toronto FC	Foxborough, Massachusetts
	Twellman 12', 18'; Joseph 60' (pen.); Dorman 72'; John (yellow card) 72'	Report	Buddle (yellow card) 13'; Boyens (yellow card) 45'; Nagamura (yellow card) 60'; Brennan (yellow card) 72'	Stadium: Gillette Stadium; Attendance: 18,184; Referee: Mark Geiger

April 19, 2007 3	Columbus Crew	2–2	New England Revolution	Columbus, Ohio
	Grabavoy 8' (yellow card) 49', Kamara 86'; Hejduk (yellow card) 82'; Pierce (yellow card) 90+4'	Report	Dorman 10'; Twellman 38'; Heaps (yellow card) 42'; Larentowicz (yellow card) 76'	Stadium: Columbus Crew Stadium; Attendance: 13,290; Referee: Ricardo Salazar

April 29, 2007 4	FC Dallas	0–1	New England Revolution	Frisco, Texas
	Ruiz (yellow card) 42'	Report	John (yellow card) 4'; Twellman 13'; Riley (yellow card) 51'; Ralston (yellow card) 53'	Stadium: Pizza Hut Park; Attendance: 9,165; Referee: Michael Kennedy

May 3, 2007 5	D.C. United	1–1	New England Revolution	Washington DC
	Boswell (yellow card) 24'; Gomez (yellow card) 44'; Moreno 50' (pen.); Emilio (yellow card) 76'; Kpene (yellow card) 90+4'	Report	Dorman 46'; Larentowicz (yellow card) 47'; Joseph (yellow card) 59'	Stadium: RFK Stadium; Attendance: 12,908; Referee: Terry Vaughn

May 6, 2007 6	New England Revolution	3–1	Chicago Fire	Foxborough, Massachusetts
	Larentowicz 16'; Ralston 68'; Thompson 81'	Report	Brown (yellow card) 38'; Rolfe 45'	Stadium: Gillette Stadium; Attendance: 9,508; Referee: Alex Prus

May 12, 2007 7	LA Galaxy	2–3	New England Revolution	Carson, California
	Martino 14'; Marshall 84' (yellow card) 41'	Report	Riley (yellow card) 4'; Cristman 47'; Twellman 52', 85'; Reis (yellow card) 74'	Stadium: The Home Depot Center; Attendance: 22,715; Referee: Brian Hall

May 19, 2007 8	Houston Dynamo	0–1	New England Revolution	Houston, Texas
	Ching (yellow card) 45'; De Rosario (yellow card) 45'; Holden (yellow card) 71'; Cochrane (yellow card) 77'	Report	Joseph 9'; Smith (yellow card) 41'; Heaps (yellow card) 82'	Stadium: Robertson Stadium; Attendance: 10,677; Referee: Shane Moody

May 26, 2007 9	New England Revolution	3–4	Kansas City Wizards	Foxborough, Massachusetts
	Ralston 11'; Twellman 23'; Dorman (yellow card) 29'; Riley (yellow card) 35'; Joseph 69' (pen.); Thompson (yellow card) 78'	Report	Arnaud 25' (yellow card) 45'; Eddie Johnson 26', 38', 82'	Stadium: Gillette Stadium; Attendance: 13,156; Referee: Abby Okulaja

June 2, 2007 10	New England Revolution	0-0	Real Salt Lake	Foxborough, Massachusetts
	Lancos (yellow card) 38'; Forko (yellow card) 66'; Kotschau (red card) 82'	Report	Larentowicz (yellow card) 42'; Byrne (yellow card) 72'	Stadium: Gillette Stadium; Attendance: 16,184; Referee: Baldomero Toledo

June 16, 2007 11	New England Revolution	3–3	Columbus Crew	Foxborough, Massachusetts
	Cristman 13', 32'; Noonan 17'; Dorman (yellow card) 87'	Report	Rogers 9'; Pierce (yellow card) 40'; O'Rourke (yellow card) 43'; Barros Schelotto 45+1'; Moreno 85'	Stadium: Gillette Stadium; Attendance: 22,412; Referee: Ramon Hernandez

June 23, 2007 12	New England Revolution	3–0	Toronto FC	Foxborough, Massachusetts
	Dorman 13', 81'; Noonan 33'; Smith (yellow card) 83'	Report	Goldthwaite (yellow card) 21'; Djekanović (yellow card) 50'; Dichio (yellow card) 70'; Wynne (yellow card) 90+1'	Stadium: Gillette Stadium; Attendance: 10,114; Referee: Alex Prus

June 30, 2007 13	Chivas USA	2–0	New England Revolution	Carson, California
	Perez (yellow card) 21'; Marsch 60'; Vaughn (yellow card) 70'; Nagamura (yellow card) 80'; Suarez (red card) 81'; Galindo 89'; Zotinca (yellow card) 92'	Report	Thompson (yellow card) 65'	Stadium: The Home Depot Center; Attendance: 9,028; Referee: Michael Kennedy

July 7, 2007 14	New England Revolution	1–1	Chivas USA	Foxborough, Massachusetts
	John (yellow card) 13'; Joseph; Dorman 64'; Heaps (yellow card) 69'; Noonan (yellow card) 90+4'	Report	Galindo 4'; Zotinca (yellow card) 25'; Suarez (yellow card) 29'	Stadium: Gillette Stadium; Attendance: 13,266; Referee: Baldomero Toledo

July 14, 2007 15	New York Red Bulls	0–1	New England Revolution	East Rutherford, New Jersey
	Goldthwaite (yellow card) 72'; Freeman (yellow card) 76'; Richards (yellow card) 81'; Angel (red card) 90+1'	Report	Dorman 38'; Thompson (yellow card) 76'	Stadium: Giants Stadium; Attendance: 13,819; Referee: Ramon Hernandez

July 22, 2007 16	New England Revolution	3–3	Houston Dynamo	Foxborough, Massachusetts
	Noonan 32'; Twellman 51'; Joseph 66' (pen.)	Report	De Rosario 49' (yellow card) 53'; Ching 60', 61'; Ngwenya (yellow card) 65'; Robinson (yellow card) 86'	Stadium: Gillette Stadium; Attendance: 14,606; Referee: Kevin Stott

July 28, 2007 17	Real Salt Lake	1–2	New England Revolution	Salt Lake City, Utah
	Pope (yellow card) 34'; Williams (red card) 67'; Talley 72' (pen.)	Report	Noonan 39'; Dorman (yellow card) 36'; Larentowicz 82'	Stadium: Rice-Eccles Stadium; Attendance: 13,193; Referee: Michael Kennedy

August 2, 2007 18	New England Revolution	2–0	Kansas City Wizards	Foxborough, Massachusetts
	Joseph (yellow card) 24'; Noonan 55'; Cristman 90+1'	Report	Marinelli (yellow card) 24'; Raybould 79'	Stadium: Gillette Stadium; Attendance: 12,915; Referee: Brian Hall

August 5, 2007 19	New England Revolution	0–3	D.C. United	Foxborough, Massachusetts
	Heaps (yellow card) 46'; Larentowicz (yellow card) 65'; Noonan (yellow card) 76'; John (yellow card) 83'	Report	Dyachenko (yellow card) 17'; Gros 22'; Olsen (yellow card) 27'; Emilio 31', 76'; Mediate (yellow card) 84'	Stadium: Gillette Stadium; Attendance: 12,618; Referee: Alex Prus

August 12, 2007 20	New England Revolution	1–0	LA Galaxy	Foxborough, Massachusetts
	Twellman 55'	Report	Buddle (yellow card) 42'; Jazić (yellow card) 71'	Stadium: Gillette Stadium; Attendance: 35,402; Referee: Abby Okulaja
Note: This match featured David Beckham's first trip to Gillette Stadium as a member of the LA Galaxy.

August 16, 2007 21	Colorado Rapids	3–0	New England Revolution	Commerce City, Colorado
	Kirovski 10', 41' (pen.); Cummings 76'; Prideaux (yellow card) 71'; Sanneh (yellow card) 90+2'	Report	Smith (yellow card) 36'; Joseph (yellow card) 42'	Stadium: Dick's Sporting Goods Park; Attendance: 10,677; Referee: Jorge Gonzalez

August 19, 2007 22	Kansas City Wizards	0–1	New England Revolution	Kansas City, Missouri
	Conrad (yellow card) 78'; Marinelli (yellow card) 90'	Report	Twellman 72'; Smith (yellow card) 90'	Stadium: Arrowhead Stadium; Attendance: 9,035; Referee: Jair Marrufo

August 25, 2007 23	New England Revolution	2–1	New York Red Bulls	Foxborough, Massachusetts
	Twellman 46' (yellow card) 87'; Thompson (yellow card) 65'; Mendes 80' (o.g.)	Report	Altidore 30'; Reyna (yellow card) 59'	Stadium: Gillette Stadium; Attendance: 16,017; Referee: Baldomero Toledo

September 9, 2007 24	D.C. United	4–2	New England Revolution	Washington DC
	Fred 31' (yellow card) 36'; Moreno 60'; Emilio 68', 83'	Report	Twellman 45'; Heaps 55'	Stadium: RFK Stadium; Attendance: 18,918; Referee: Abby Okulaja

September 15, 2007 25	New England Revolution	4–2	FC Dallas	Foxborough, Massachusetts
	Noonan 29', 65'; Ralston 78'; Cristman (yellow card) 83'; Joseph (yellow card) 86'; Reis (yellow card) 88'; Smith 90'	Report	Ruiz 35', 84' (yellow card) 57'	Stadium: Gillette Stadium; Attendance: 15,289; Referee: Kevin Stott

September 22, 2007 26	New York Red Bulls	2–2	New England Revolution	East Rutherford, New Jersey
	Angel (yellow card) 18' (goal) 84'; Doe (yellow card) 37'	Report	Twellman 22', 70'	Stadium: Giants Stadium; Attendance: 16,823; Referee: Richard Herron

September 29, 2007 27	New England Revolution	1–0	Colorado Rapids	Foxborough, Massachusetts
	Heaps (yellow card) 10'; Dorman (yellow card) 69'; Smith 88'	Report	Kirovski (yellow card) 58'; Ballouchy (yellow card) 67'	Stadium: Gillette Stadium; Attendance: 19,166; Referee: Ricardo Salazar

October 6, 2007 28	Chicago Fire	2–1	New England Revolution	Bridgeview, Illinois
	Rolfe 45+1'; Wanchope (yellow card) 57'; Barrett 60'; Soumaré (yellow card) 83'	Report	Larentowicz 24'; Twellman (yellow card) 34'; Mansally (yellow card) 89'	Stadium: Toyota Park; Attendance: 20,014; Referee: Baldomero Toledo

October 13, 2007 29	New England Revolution	2–3	Columbus Crew	Foxborough, Massachusetts
	Riley (yellow card) 16'; Twellman 26'; Thompson (yellow card) 59'; Ralston 83'	Report	Gaven 61'; Barros Schelotto (yellow card) 74' (goal) 86'; Miglioranzi 77'; Moreno (yellow card) 90+1'	Stadium: Gillette Stadium; Attendance: 22,295; Referee: Michael Kennedy

October 20, 2007 30	Toronto FC	2–2	New England Revolution	Toronto, Ontario, Canada
	Lombardo (yellow card) 7'; Robinson (yellow card) 43'; Samuel 59'; Dichio 90+2'	Report	Wells Thompson (yellow card) 42'; Parkhurst 45+2'; Twellman 48'	Stadium: BMO Field; Attendance: 20,374; Referee: Steven DePiero

=== MLS playoffs ===
October 27, 2007 Conf. Semifinals	New York Red Bulls	0–0	New England Revolution	East Rutherford, New Jersey
	Parke (yellow card) 83'	Report	Parkhurst (yellow card) 73'; John (yellow card) 85'	Stadium: Giants Stadium; Attendance: 14,165; Referee: Jair Marrufo

November 3, 2007 Conf. Semifinals	New England Revolution	1–0	New York Red Bulls	Foxborough, Massachusetts
	Joseph (yellow card) 31'; Thompson (yellow card) 50'; Twellman 64' (yellow card) 80'; Smith (yellow card) 73'	Report	Vide (yellow card) 34'	Stadium: Gillette Stadium; Attendance: 10,116; Referee: Abby Okulaja

November 8, 2007 Conf. Finals	Chicago Fire	0–1	New England Revolution	Gillette Stadium, Foxborough, Massachusetts
		Report	Larentowicz (yellow card) 36'; Twellman 38'	Attendance: 10,317; Referee: Kevin Stott

November 18, 2007 MLS Cup Final	New England Revolution	1–2	Houston Dynamo	Washington, D.C.
	Twellman 20'; Smith (yellow card) 65'	Report	Barrett (yellow card) 57'; Ngwenya 61'; De Rosario 74'	Stadium: RFK Stadium; Attendance: 39,859; Referee: Alex Prus

=== U.S. Open Cup ===
July 7, 2007 Third round	Rochester Rhinos (USL-1)	2-4	New England Revolution	Rochester, New York
	Diallo 76', 85'; Scheufele (yellow card) 90+2'	Report	Ralston 19', 90+3'; Twellman 67', 90'	Stadium: PAETEC Park; Attendance: 8,551; Referee: Richard Sanchez

August 8, 2007 Quarterfinal	New England Revolution	2–1	Harrisburg City Islanders (USL-2)	New Britain, Connecticut
	Dorman 4' (yellow card) 76'; Twellman 17'; Leonard (yellow card) 88'	Report	Pierce (yellow card) 28'; Calvano (yellow card) 62' (yellow-red card) 89'; Tanzini 78'	Stadium: Veteran's Stadium; Attendance: 3,100; Referee: Lee Suckle

September 4, 2007 Semifinal	New England Revolution	2–1 (a.e.t.)	Carolina Railhawks (USL-1	New Britain, Connecticut
	John (yellow card) 41'; Joseph (red card) 42'; Larentowicz 45+3' (yellow card) 73'; Cristman (yellow card) 88'; Noonan 93'	Report	Maher 6' (yellow card) 21'; Stokes (yellow card) 41' (yellow-red card) 80'; Edozien (red card) 42'; Low (yellow card) 55'; Bailey (yellow card) 106'; Dombrowski (yellow card) 110'	Stadium: Veteran's Stadium; Attendance: 4,203; Referee: Shane Moody

October 3, 2007 Final	FC Dallas	2–3	New England Revolution	Dallas, Texas
	Alvarez 30'; Thompson 64'	Report	Noonan 21'; Twellman 41'; Thompson 57'; Larentowicz (yellow card) 74'; Riley (yellow card) 86'	Stadium: Pizza Hut Park; Attendance: 10,168; Referee: Alex Prus

== Honors ==
New England Revolution – 2007 League and Team Awards
Award	Name(s)
Team Most Valuable Player	Taylor Twellman
Revolution Golden Boot	Taylor Twellman (16 G, 3 A)
Team Defender of the Year	Michael Parkhurst
Revolution Humanitarian of the Year	Michael Parkhurst
2007 MLS Best XI Selections	Shalrie Joseph, Michael Parkhurst
MLS All-Star Game Selections	Taylor Twellman, Shalrie Joseph, Matt Reis, Steve Ralston, Michael Parkhurst
MLS Defender of the Year	Michael Parkhurst
MLS Goalkeeper of the Year	Matt Reis (Finalist)
MLS Goal of the Year	Michael Parkhurst (finalist)
MLS Rookie of the Year	Adam Cristman (finalist)
MLS Fair Play Award (Individual)	Michael Parkhurst
MLS Player of the Week	Taylor Twellman (Week 6)
MLS Goal of the Week	Taylor Twellman (Week 4 at DAL), Taylor Twellman (Week 24 at DC)
