= Tanzini =

Tanzini is an Italian surname. Notable people with the surname include:

- Anna Tanzini (1914–?), Italian gymnast
- Athos Tanzini (1913–2008), Italian fencer
- Matt Tanzini (born 1976), American soccer player
