= 2009 New England Revolution season =

New England Revolution
2009 season
- Owner: Robert Kraft
- Coach: Steve Nicol
- Major League Soccer: 3rd East; 7th Overall
- Playoffs: Conference Semifinals
- U.S. Open Cup: Third round
- SuperLiga: Semifinals
- Top goalscorer: League: Joseph (8); All: Dube (10)
- Average home league attendance: 13,732 (regular season); 7,416 (playoffs)
Home colors	Away colors

The 2009 New England Revolution season was the fourteenth season of the team's existence, and the eighth straight in which the team made the playoffs. It began on March 21 with a 1–0 road win over the San Jose Earthquakes and ended on November 7 with a 2–0 loss to the Chicago Fire (the Revs lost the series 3–2 on aggregate).

== Squad ==
=== First-team squad ===
As of August 8, 2009. Note: Flags indicate national team as defined under FIFA eligibility rules; some limited exceptions apply. Players may hold more than one non-FIFA nationality.

No.	Pos.	Nation	Player
1	GK	USA	Matt Reis
2	DF	USA	Amaechi Igwe
3	DF	USA	Chris Albright
4	DF	CRC	Gabriel Badilla
5	DF	GHA	Emmanuel Osei
6	DF	USA	Jay Heaps
7	MF	USA	Wells Thompson
8	MF	USA	Chris Tierney
9	FW	CMR	Stephane Assengue
10	FW	LTU	Edgaras Jankauskas
11	FW	ZIM	Kheli Dube
13	MF	USA	Jeff Larentowicz
14	MF	USA	Steve Ralston (captain)

No.	Pos.	Nation	Player
16	MF	HON	Mauricio Castro
19	MF	USA	Michael Videira
20	FW	USA	Taylor Twellman
21	MF	GRN	Shalrie Joseph (vice-captain)
24	GK	USA	Brad Knighton
25	DF	USA	Darrius Barnes
26	MF	USA	Nico Colaluca
28	MF	USA	Pat Phelan
29	FW	GAM	Kenny Mansally
30	DF	USA	Kevin Alston
31	MF	GAM	Sainey Nyassi
34	GK	USA	Bobby Shuttleworth

=== Transfers ===
==== In ====
Note: Flags indicate national team as defined under FIFA eligibility rules; some limited exceptions apply. Players may hold more than one non-FIFA nationality.

No.	Pos.	Nation	Player
19	MF	USA	Michael Videira (Unattached, Free)
25	DF	USA	Darius Barnes (Superdraft)
9	FW	CMR	Stephane Assengue (from Daga Young Stars, Free)

No.	Pos.	Nation	Player
5	DF	GHA	Emmanuel Osei (from Liberty Professionals F.C., Free)
26	MF	USA	Nico Colaluca (from Colorado Rapids, Trade)
10	FW	LTU	Edgaras Jankauskas (from REO LT Vilnius, Free)

==== Out ====
Note: Flags indicate national team as defined under FIFA eligibility rules; some limited exceptions apply. Players may hold more than one non-FIFA nationality.

No.	Pos.	Nation	Player
7	FW	USA	Adam Cristman (to Kansas City Wizards, Trade)
18	MF	BER	Khano Smith (to Seattle Sounders FC, Expansion Draft)
12	GK	USA	Doug Warren (Released on waivers)

No.	Pos.	Nation	Player
—	FW	USA	José Angulo (Released on waivers)
15	DF	USA	Michael Parkhurst (to FC Nordsjælland, Free)
—	DF	USA	Rob Valentino (from Colorado Rapids, Trade)

=== Honors ===
Adapted from 2024 Media Guide (pg. 326–328)

New England Revolution – 2009 League and team awards
Award	Name
MLS Most Valuable Player	Shalrie Joseph (Finalist)
MLS Fair Play Award (Individual)	Steve Ralston
MLS Best XI Selections	Shalrie Joseph
MLS Player of the Week	Taylor Twellman (Week 12), Kheli Dube (Week 23), Shalrie Joseph (Week 28)
MLS All-Stars	Shalrie Joseph
MLS Goal of the Week	Sainey Nyassi (Week 3 vs. DAL), Wells Thompson (Week 24 vs. SJ), Edgaras Jankauskas (Week 25 vs. KC)
MLS Goal of the Year	Edgaras Jankauskas (Finalist)
Revolution Most Valuable Player	Shalrie Joseph
Revolution Defender of the Year	Jay Heaps
Revolution Humanitarian of the Year	Steve Ralston
Revolution Golden Boot	Shalrie Joseph (8g 8a)

== Club ==
=== Management ===
Position	Staff
Director of Soccer	(United States) Mike Burns
Head Coach	(Scotland) Steve Nicol
Goalkeeper Coach	(England) Gwynne Williams
Head Athletic trainer	(United States) Wayne Penniman
Equipment manager	(United States) Brian Banfill

Last updated: April 18, 2009
Source: New England Revolution

=== Other information ===
Owner	(United States) Robert Kraft
Ground (capacity and dimensions)	Gillette Stadium (68,756 / N/A)

Source: New England Revolution

== Competitions ==
=== Overall ===
Competition	Started round	Current position / round	Final position / round	First match	Last match
MLS	—	—		March 21, 2009	
USOC	Third round	—	Third round	June 30, 2009	
Superliga	Group B	—	Semifinal	June 21, 2009	July 15, 2009

Updated to match played July 15, 2009
Source: Competitions

=== Major League Soccer ===
==== Standings ====
Pos	Team	Pld	W	L	T	GF	GA	GD	Pts	Qualification
1	Columbus Crew	30	13	7	10	41	31	+10	49	MLS Cup Playoffs
2	Chicago Fire	30	11	7	12	39	34	+5	45	MLS Cup Playoffs
3	New England Revolution	30	11	10	9	33	37	−4	42	MLS Cup Playoffs
4	D.C. United	30	9	8	13	43	44	−1	40	
5	Toronto FC	30	10	11	9	37	46	−9	39	
6	Kansas City Wizards	30	8	13	9	33	42	−9	33	
7	New York Red Bulls	30	5	19	6	27	47	−20	21	

Source: MLS

Pos	Team	Pld	W	L	T	GF	GA	GD	Pts	Qualification
1	Columbus Crew (S)	30	13	7	10	41	31	+10	49	CONCACAF Champions League
2	LA Galaxy	30	12	6	12	36	31	+5	48	CONCACAF Champions League
3	Houston Dynamo	30	13	8	9	39	29	+10	48	North American SuperLiga
4	Seattle Sounders FC	30	12	7	11	38	29	+9	47	CONCACAF Champions League
5	Chicago Fire	30	11	7	12	39	34	+5	45	North American SuperLiga
6	Chivas USA	30	13	11	6	34	31	+3	45	North American SuperLiga
7	New England Revolution	30	11	10	9	33	37	−4	42	North American SuperLiga
8	Real Salt Lake (C)	30	11	12	7	43	35	+8	40	CONCACAF Champions League
9	Colorado Rapids	30	10	10	10	42	38	+4	40	
10	D.C. United	30	9	8	13	43	44	−1	40	
11	FC Dallas	30	11	13	6	50	47	+3	39	
12	Toronto FC	30	10	11	9	37	46	−9	39	CONCACAF Champions League
13	Kansas City Wizards	30	8	13	9	33	42	−9	33	
14	San Jose Earthquakes	30	7	14	9	36	50	−14	30	
15	New York Red Bulls	30	5	19	6	27	47	−20	21	

Source: MLS
Rules for classification: 1) points; 2) head-to-head record; 3) goal difference; 4) number of goals scored
(C) Champions; (S) Supporters' Shield

==== Results summary ====
Overall								Home						Away					
Pld	Pts	W	L	T	GF	GA	GD	W	L	T	GF	GA	GD	W	L	T	GF	GA	GD
30	42	11	10	9	33	37	−4	7	4	4	22	16	+6	4	6	5	11	21	−10

Last updated: October 25, 2009
Source: Major League Soccer
Pld = Matches played; Pts = Points; W = Matches won; T = Matches tied; L = Matches lost; GF = Goals for; GA = Goals against; GD = Goal difference

Round	1	2	3	4	5	6	7	8	9	10	11	12	13	14	15	16	17	18	19	20	21	22	23	24	25	26	27	28	29	30
Stadium	A	A	H	A	A	H	A	H	A	H	H	A	A	H	H	A	H	H	A	H	H	H	A	A	H	A	A	H	H	A
Result	W	T	W	T	L	L	T	T	L	W	W	L	L	T	W	W	T	L	W	W	W	L	L	T	W	L	T	L	T	W

Updated to match(es) played on October 25, 2009. Source: New England Revolution
A = Away; H = Home; W = Win; L = Loss; T = Tie

== Matches ==
Win Tie Loss

=== Preseason ===
The Revolution began their preseason a week-long trip to Austin, Texas, then spent 12 days in North Carolina.

March 7	Austin Aztex FC	0–2	New England Revolution	Austin, Texas
7:30 am EST		,	Michael Videira 7'; Unknown 57' (o.g.)	Stadium: Nelson Field

March 7	Wake Forest	1–2	New England Revolution	Greensboro, North Carolina
7:00 am EST	Corben Bone 15'	https://library.thekraftgroup.com/20090307_game_notes_nc.pdf],	Akira Fitzgerald 40' (o.g.); Wells Thompson 42'	Stadium: Macpherson Stadium; Attendance: 2,478

March 14	Carolina Railhawks	1–0	New England Revolution	Cary, North Carolina
7:00 am EST		,		Stadium: WakeMed Soccer Park

=== MLS regular season ===
March 21, 2009	San Jose Earthquakes	0–1	New England Revolution	Santa Clara, California
	Amarikwa (yellow card) 74'; Denton (yellow card) 79'	Report	Dube 55'	Stadium: Buck Shaw Stadium; Attendance: 10,335; Referee: Ricardo Salazar

March 28, 2009	New York Red Bulls	1–1	New England Revolution	East Rutherford, New Jersey
	Heaps 35' (o.g.); Sassano (yellow card) 39'; Mendes (yellow card) 46+'; Borman (yellow card) 48'	Report	Thompson (yellow card) 48'; Dube (yellow card) 82'; Mansally 90'	Stadium: Giants Stadium; Attendance: 12,462; Referee: Alex Prus

April 4, 2009	New England Revolution	2–1	FC Dallas	Foxborough, Massachusetts
	Rocha (yellow card) 33'; Cooper 38'; John (yellow card) 79'	Report	Larentowicz (yellow card) 31'; Mansally (yellow card) 34'; Nyassi 56'; Ralston 80' (pen.)	Stadium: Gillette Stadium; Attendance: 11,314; Referee: Silviu Petrescu

April 17, 2009	D.C. United	1–1	New England Revolution	Washington, D.C.
	Olsen (yellow card) 74'; Olsen 91+'	Report	Joseph 50'; Thompson (yellow card) 74'; Joseph (yellow card) 92+'	Stadium: RFK Stadium; Attendance: 14,441; Referee: Jair Marrufo

April 25, 2009	Real Salt Lake	6–0	New England Revolution	Sandy, Utah
	Morales (yellow card) 43'; Olave 53'; Mathis 55'; Movsisyan 70'; Escalada 81'; Williams 85'; Findley 89'	Report	Thompson (yellow card) 22'; Heaps (yellow card) 45'; Mansally (yellow card) 57'	Stadium: Rio Tinto Stadium; Attendance: 14,051

May 3, 2009	New England Revolution	0–2	Houston Dynamo	Foxborough, Massachusetts
	Mansally (yellow card) 51'	Report	Holden 22'; Clark (yellow card) 44'; Ching 58'; Mullan (yellow card) 63'	Stadium: Gillette Stadium; Attendance: 9,112; Referee: Terry Vaughn

May 9, 2009	Chicago Fire	1–1	New England Revolution	Bridgeview, Illinois
	Conde 36'	Report	Joseph 49'; Larentowicz (yellow card) 60'; Heaps (yellow card) 79'	Stadium: Toyota Park; Attendance: 11,288; Referee: Mark Geiger

May 16, 2009	New England Revolution	1–1	Colorado Rapids	Foxborough, Massachusetts
	Phelan (yellow card) 4'; Ralston 18'	Report	Casey 3'; Casey (yellow card) 41'; Cummings (yellow card) 50'	Stadium: Gillette Stadium; Attendance: 10,677; Referee: Shane Moody

May 23, 2009	Toronto FC	3–1	New England Revolution	Toronto, Canada
	Guevara 14'; De Rosario 68'; Guevara 70'; Guevara (yellow card) 80'	Report	Joseph 13'; Thompson (yellow card) 69'; Ralston (yellow card) 81'	Stadium: BMO Field; Attendance: 20,478; Referee: Michael Kennedy

May 30, 2009	New England Revolution	2–1	D.C. United	Foxborough, Massachusetts
	Joseph 55'; Heaps (yellow card) 80'; Barnes (yellow card) 84'; Ralston 90' (pen.)	Report	Pontius (yellow card) 21'; Fred 36'; Wallace (yellow card) 46+'; Wicks (yellow card) 81'; McTavish (yellow card) 89'	Stadium: Gillette Stadium; Attendance: 15,271; Referee: Hilario Grejeda

June 7, 2009	New England Revolution	4–0	New York Red Bulls	Foxborough, Massachusetts
	Joseph (yellow card) 33'; Heaps 47+'; Ralston 52'; Twellman 57' 64'	Report	Goldthwaite (yellow card) 45'	Stadium: Gillette Stadium; Attendance: 11,183; Referee: Abiodun Okulaja

June 13, 2009	Kansas City Wizards	3–1	New England Revolution	Kansas City, Kansas
	Arnaud 19'; López (yellow card) 31'; Larentowicz 36' (o.g.); Hohlbein 39'	Report	Phelan (yellow card) 13'; Joseph 28'; Osei (red card) 31'; Alston (yellow card) 38'; Barnes (yellow card) 83'	Stadium: CommunityAmerica Ballpark; Attendance: 10,385; Referee: Ricardo Salazar

July 4, 2009	Los Angeles Galaxy	1–0	New England Revolution	Carson, California
	Eskandarian 8'; Berhalter (yellow card) 72'; Jordan (yellow card) 87'	Report	Mansally (yellow card) 50'; Thompson (yellow card) 61'; Phelan (yellow card) 61'; Reis (yellow card) 87'	Stadium: The Home Depot Center; Attendance: 20,609; Referee: Mark Geiger

July 11, 2009	New England Revolution	0–0	Kansas City Wizards	Foxborough, Massachusetts
	Alston (yellow card) 24'; Larentowicz (yellow card) 33'	Report	Jewsbury (yellow card) 33'; Harrington (yellow card) 53'; Watson (red card) 81'	Stadium: Gillette Stadium; Attendance: 24,137; Referee: Baldomero Toledo

July 19, 2009	New England Revolution	2–0	Chivas USA	Foxborough, Massachusetts
	Dube 61'; Ralston 77'	Report	Nagamura (yellow card) 44'; Lillingston (yellow card) 75'; Lahoud (yellow card) 84'; Talley (yellow card) 92'	Stadium: Gillette Stadium; Attendance: 10,997; Referee: Jeff Gontarek

July 25, 2009	Houston Dynamo	0–1	New England Revolution	Houston, Texas
	James (yellow card) 38'; Clark (yellow card) 78'	Report	Larentowicz (yellow card) 34'; Dube 76'	Stadium: Robertson Stadium; Attendance: 15,179; Referee: Michael Kennedy

August 1, 2009	New England Revolution	1–1	Toronto FC	Foxborough, Massachusetts
	Jankauskas 76'; Videira (yellow card) 92+'	Report	Gerba (yellow card) 12'; De Rosario 34'; Barrett (yellow card) 36' (yellow-red card) 50'; Serioux (yellow card) 59'; Frei (yellow card) 93+'	Stadium: Gillette Stadium; Attendance: 12,014; Referee: Vaughn

August 8, 2009	New England Revolution	1–2	Los Angeles Galaxy	Foxborough, Massachusetts
	Mansally (yellow card) 74'; Ralston 83'	Report	Donovan 21'; Kirovski 52'; Lewis (yellow card) 77'	Stadium: Gillette Stadium; Attendance: 26,623; Referee: Jorge Gonzalez

August 20, 2009	Seattle Sounders FC	0–1	New England Revolution	Seattle, Washington
19:00 PST	Gonzalez (yellow card) 40'; Montero (yellow card) 54'; Nyassi (yellow card) 86'	Report	Joseph 21'; Ralston (yellow card) 43'; Jankauskas (yellow card) 47+'; Heaps (yellow card) 49+'; Reis (yellow card) 65'	Stadium: Qwest Field; Attendance: 32,705; Referee: Baldomero Toledo

August 23, 2009	New England Revolution	3–1	Real Salt Lake	Foxborough, Massachusetts
	Dube 9'; Dube 29'; Barnes (yellow card) 35'; Dube (yellow card) 47'; Dube 66'	Report	Espindola (yellow card) 35'; Johnson (yellow card) 65'; Barnes 85' (o.g.); Wingert (yellow card) 87'	Stadium: Gillette Stadium; Attendance: 10,552; Referee: Edvin Jurisevic

August 29, 2009	New England Revolution	2–1	San Jose Earthquakes	Foxborough, Massachusetts
	Ralston 68'; Thompson 74'; Thompson (yellow card) 75'	Report	Corrales (yellow card) 4'; Sanchez (yellow card) 48'; Sanchez 92+'	Stadium: Gillette Stadium; Attendance: 7,286; Referee: Alex Prus

September 5, 2009	New England Revolution	2–4	Kansas City Wizards	Foxborough, Massachusetts
	Shalrie Joseph (red card) 23'; Wells Thompson (yellow card) 50'; Edgaras Jankauskas 64'; Kheli Dube 81'		Claudio Lopez 3'; Jay Heaps 29' (o.g.); Lance Watson (yellow card) 63'; Josh Wolff 73'; Josh Wolff 91+'	Stadium: Gillette Stadium; Attendance: 9,489; Referee: Jasen Anno

September 13, 2009	Chivas USA	2–0	New England Revolution	Carson, California
	Maicon 10'; Talley (red card) 70'; Kljestan 94+' (pen.)	Report	Osei (yellow card) 42'; Jankauskas (red card) 70'; Thompson (yellow card) 73'	Stadium: The Home Depot Center; Attendance: 11,334; Referee: Ricardo Salazar

September 18, 2009	New York Red Bulls	1–1	New England Revolution	East Rutherford, New Jersey
	Petke (yellow card) 21'; Boyens (yellow card) 31'; Celades (yellow card) 55'; Wolyniec 69'	Report	Nyassi 13'; Dube (yellow card) 73'	Stadium: Giants Stadium; Attendance: 10,979; Referee: Hilario Grajeda

September 26, 2009	New England Revolution	2–1	Seattle Sounders FC	Foxborough, Massachusetts
19:30 EST	Joseph 51' (pen.); Joseph 87'	Report	Montero 5'; Jaqua (yellow card) 92+'	Stadium: Gillette Stadium; Attendance: 15,961; Referee: Steven DePiero

September 30, 2009	FC Dallas	1–0	New England Revolution	Dallas, Texas
	Harris (yellow card) 59'; Cunningham 71'; Rocha (yellow card) 88' (yellow-red card) 91+'	Report	Videira (yellow card) 26'; Osei (yellow card) 51'; Thompson (red card) 91+'	Stadium: Cotton Bowl; Attendance: 51,012; Referee: Ramón Hernández

October 3, 2009	Colorado Rapids	1–1	New England Revolution	Commerce City, Colorado
	Ballouchy (yellow card) 9'; Casey 58' (pen.); Baudet (red card) 59'	Report	Dube 29'; Osei (yellow card) 63'	Stadium: Dick's Sporting Goods Park; Attendance: 16,535; Referee: Baldomero Toledo

October 10, 2009	New England Revolution	0–1	Columbus Crew	Foxborough, Massachusetts
	Osei (yellow card) 7'; Joseph (yellow card) 38'; Dube (yellow card) 45'	Report	Padula 36'; Burns (yellow card) 46+'; Brunner (yellow card) 50'; Ekpo (red card) 65'; Zayner (yellow card) 93+'	Stadium: Gillette Stadium; Attendance: 13,297; Referee: Paul Ward

October 17, 2009	New England Revolution	0–0	Chicago Fire	Foxborough, Massachusetts
	Banner (yellow card) 5'; McBride (yellow card) 62'	Report	Nyassi (yellow card) 41'	Stadium: Gillette Stadium; Attendance: 18,064; Referee: Jorge Gonzalez

October 25, 2009	Columbus Crew	0–1	New England Revolution	Columbus, Ohio
	Iro (yellow card) 60'; Zayner (yellow card) 63'; Padula (yellow card) 81'; Moffat (yellow card) 88'	Report	Heaps (yellow card) 55'; Larentowicz 79'	Stadium: Columbus Crew Stadium; Attendance: 16,797; Referee: Kevin Stott

=== MLS playoffs ===
November 1, 2009 Conf. Semifinals	New England Revolution	2–1	Chicago Fire	Foxborough, Massachusetts
14:00 EST	Alston (yellow card) 41'; Osei 47+'; Joseph 75'	report	Rolfe 17'; Husidic (yellow card) 93+'	Stadium: Gillette Stadium; Attendance: 7,416; Referee: Baldomero Toledo

November 7, 2009 Conf. Semifinals	Chicago Fire	2–0	New England Revolution	Bridgeview, Illinois
19:30 CST	Thorrington 35'; Blanco 83'	report	Mansally (yellow card) 17'; Jankauskas (yellow card) 36'; Larentowicz (yellow card) 85'	Stadium: Toyota Park; Attendance: 21,528; Referee: Alex Prus

=== SuperLiga 2009 ===
June 21, 2009 Group stage	New England (United States)	4–2	(Mexico) Santos Laguna	Foxborough, Massachusetts
18:30 EDT	Dube (yellow card) 30'; Osei (yellow card) 31'; Larentowicz 38'; Mansally 60'; Heaps 63'; Dube 82'; Phelan (yellow card) 91+'	Report	Mares (yellow card) 28'; Vuoso 51'; Rodriguez 55'; Vuoso (yellow card) 69'; Jiménez (yellow card) 92+'	Stadium: Gillette Stadium; Attendance: 9,512; Referee: Cortney Campbell (Jamaica)

June 24, 2009 Group stage	New England (United States)	1–1	(United States) Kansas City	Foxborough, Massachusetts
19:00 EDT	Videira (red card) 34'; Dube 46+'	Report	Leathers (yellow card) 28'; Thompson (yellow card) 44'; Barnes 85' (o.g.)	Stadium: Gillette Stadium; Attendance: 5,378; Referee: Jorge Gonzalez (USA)

June 28, 2009 Group stage	New England (United States)	1–0	(Mexico) Atlas	Foxborough, Massachusetts
16:30 EDT	Larentowicz (yellow card) 16'; Mansally 32'; Igwe (yellow card) 37'; Osei (yellow card) 82'	Report	Torres (yellow card) 43'; Bottinelli (yellow card) 55'; Espinoza (red card) 85'	Stadium: Gillette Stadium; Attendance: 7,411; Referee: Ricardo Cerdas (Costa Rica)

July 15, 2009 Semifinals	New England (United States)	1–2	(United States) Chicago Fire	Foxborough, Massachusetts
19:00 EDT	Phelan (yellow card) 4'; Jankauskas 44'	Report	Soumaré (yellow card) 6'; McBride 34'; Blanco (yellow card) 36'; Blanco 63'; Pappa (yellow card) 80'	Stadium: Gillette Stadium; Referee: Paul Ward (USA)

=== U.S. Open Cup ===
June 30, 2009 Third round	Harrisburg City Islanders (USL-2)	2–1 (a.e.t.)	New England Revolution	New Britain, Connecticut
7:00 pm EDT	Calvano (yellow card) 51'; Odour 72'; Bloes 105'	Report	Larentowicz 38'; Osei (yellow card) 63'; Nyassi (yellow card) 67'; Colaluca (yellow card) 92' (yellow-red card) 117'	Stadium: Veteran's Stadium; Attendance: 3,100; Referee: Lee Suckle
