= Jeff Larentowicz =

American soccer player (born 1983)

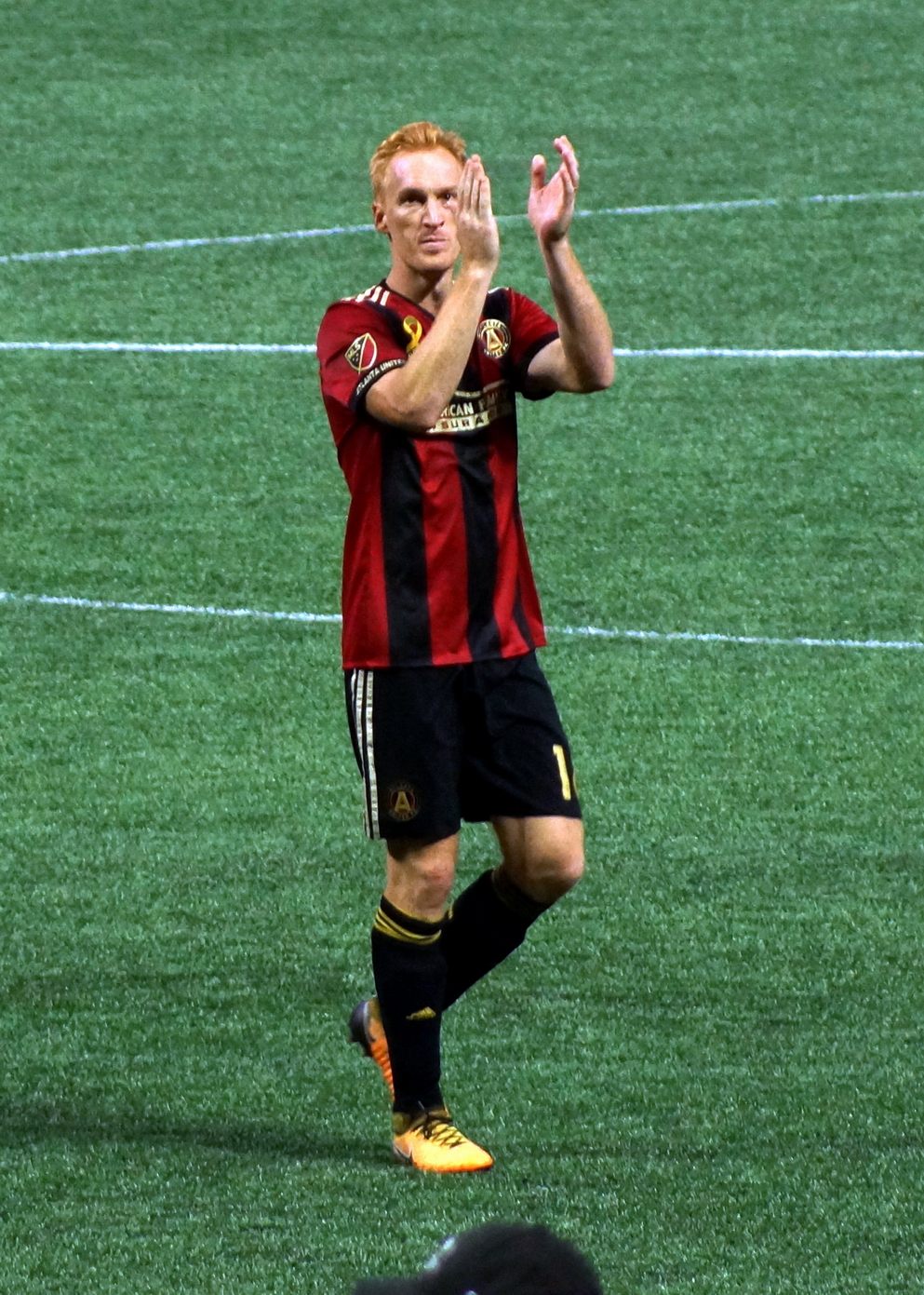
- Larentowicz after an Atlanta United game in 2017

Personal information
- Full name: Jeffrey Adam Larentowicz
- Date of birth: August 5, 1983 (age 43)
- Place of birth: Pasadena, California, United States
- Height: 1.85 m (6 ft 1 in)
- Positions: Midfielder; defender

College career
Years	Team	Apps	(Gls)
2001–2004	Brown Bears	66	(7)

Senior career*
Years	Team	Apps	(Gls)
2005–2009	New England Revolution	111	(9)
2005	→ Phantoms (loan)	5	(0)
2010–2012	Colorado Rapids	96	(14)
2013–2015	Chicago Fire	94	(14)
2016	LA Galaxy	23	(1)
2016	→ LA Galaxy II (loan)	1	(0)
2017–2020	Atlanta United	113	(4)
Total		443	(42)

International career
2011–2012	United States	4	(0)
- * Club domestic league appearances and goals

Jeffrey Adam Larentowicz (/ləˈrɛntəwɪts/ lə-REN-tə-wits; born August 5, 1983) is an American former soccer player. He was a starting midfielder on the Colorado Rapids' 2010 MLS Cup Championship team, and a starting defender for Atlanta United's 2018 Cup-winning side.

During his career as a soccer player, Larentowicz was described as one of the most consistent midfielders in Major League Soccer, adept at passing and possession while well above average in tackling, tracking and defensive cover.

== Youth and college ==
Born in Pasadena, California, to parents of Polish descent, Larentowicz played college soccer for Brown University from 2001 to 2004. In his four seasons there he played in 66 matches, amassing seven goals and six assists, helping Brown to two Ivy League Championships. Before Brown, he helped lead traditional Philadelphia-area power Chestnut Hill Academy to back-to-back Interacademic League championships in 2000 and 2001. He also captained the FC Delco Arsenal to two USYSA National Championships in 2002 and 2003.

== Professional career ==
=== New England Revolution ===
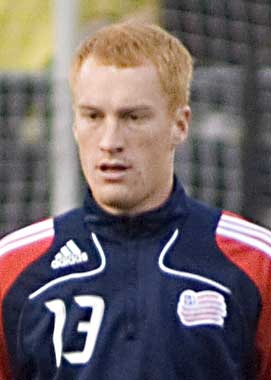
Larentowicz with New England Revolution

Larentowicz was selected in the fourth round, 45th overall in the 2005 MLS Supplemental Draft by New England Revolution. He spent his rookie campaign, the 2005 New England Revolution season, on the bench, playing only one minute with the first team all year; making his MLS and Revolution debut in a 1-0 win over D.C. United on May 14 as a 92nd minute substitute for Andy Dorman.

However, in the 2006 New England Revolution season Larentowicz came into more playing time through injuries, starting 19 games and appearing in a further seven, recording a goal and an assist. He made his first MLS start on June 11 in a 3-3 tie against Chicago Fire FC. Larentowicz scored his first-ever MLS goal on August 27, at a home game against the Columbus Crew.

In the 2007 New England Revolution season, he firmly established himself as a regular starter for the Revolution, playing all but two games as defensive midfielder alongside Shalrie Joseph, making 28 appearances (all starts), recording 3 goals and notching 4 assists.

Larentowicz was a key part of the Revolution's 2007 U.S. Open Cup run, scoring in the semi-final against the Carolina Railhawks, and starting the final, helping deliver the Revolution their first piece of silverware in club history.

In the MLS Cup 2007, Larentowicz nearly scored a late-second-half equalizer for the Revolution, forcing Pat Onstad to make a point-blank save on a diving header.

In the 2008 New England Revolution season, Larentowicz helped the Revolution win the 2008 North American SuperLiga, converting a penalty kick in the 2008 North American SuperLiga final. In regular season play he made 28 appearances (all starts), recording four goals and two assists. In the 2009 New England Revolution season Larentowicz again made 28 starts, adding a goal and notching two assists.

Larentowicz has been known by various nicknames. He acquired Ginja (or Ginger) Ninja after scoring an acrobatic goal against Chicago Fire on May 6, 2007. As a defensive midfielder who occasionally ventures into the offensive half of the pitch, he was called der Kaiser by Paul Mariner, a reference to Franz Beckenbauer. He's also known as "Big Red."

=== Colorado Rapids ===
On January 21, 2010, he was traded to Colorado Rapids along with Wells Thompson in exchange for Preston Burpo, Cory Gibbs, a 2011 MLS SuperDraft pick, and allocation money.

Larentowicz appeared in all 30 matches (29 starts) of the 2010 Colorado Rapids season, starting in 29, scoring four goals. He scored his first goal for Colorado on April 18 in a 3-1 victory over Toronto FC. He recorded his first career brace at FC Dallas on October 9. He was named to the 2010 MLS All-Star Team, the first all-star nomination of his career. In the 2010 MLS Cup Playoffs, Larentowicz played every minute of every match, including the final, which Colorado won 2-1, to claim their first-ever MLS Cup.

During the 2011 Colorado Rapids season, Larentawitcz posted a career-high seven goals, winning the team's golden boot. He started all 34 regular season matches. On August 23 he scored his first goal in continental play, scoring in a 1-1 draw with Real C.D. España in the 2011–12 CONCACAF Champions League.

On November 17, 2011, it was announced that he was training with Premier League club Bolton Wanderers following a recommendation by United States national team coach Jürgen Klinsmann.

=== Chicago Fire ===
On January 16, 2013, Larentowicz was traded with a second-round 2013 MLS SuperDraft pick to Chicago Fire in exchange for a first-round selection in the 2013 SuperDraft, allocation money, and a 2013 international roster slot. In the 2013 season, Larentowicz proved an effective addition to the Fire squad appearing in 32 games, scoring two goals, and contributing four assists. He was always entrusted with the captaincy in the absence of Logan Pause in the Fire's starting 11. He became the full-time captain of the Fire after Pause's retirement in 2014.

=== LA Galaxy ===
Larentowicz's option wasn't picked up by Chicago at the end of the 2015 MLS season. Larentowicz became a free agent and signed with LA Galaxy on January 6, 2016. He made his debut against Real Salt Lake on April 23, 2016, helping the Galaxy end the last undefeated streak of this season with a 5–2 victory. On July 4, 2016, Larentowicz scored his first goal for the Galaxy in a 2–0 win over Vancouver Whitecaps.

=== Atlanta United ===
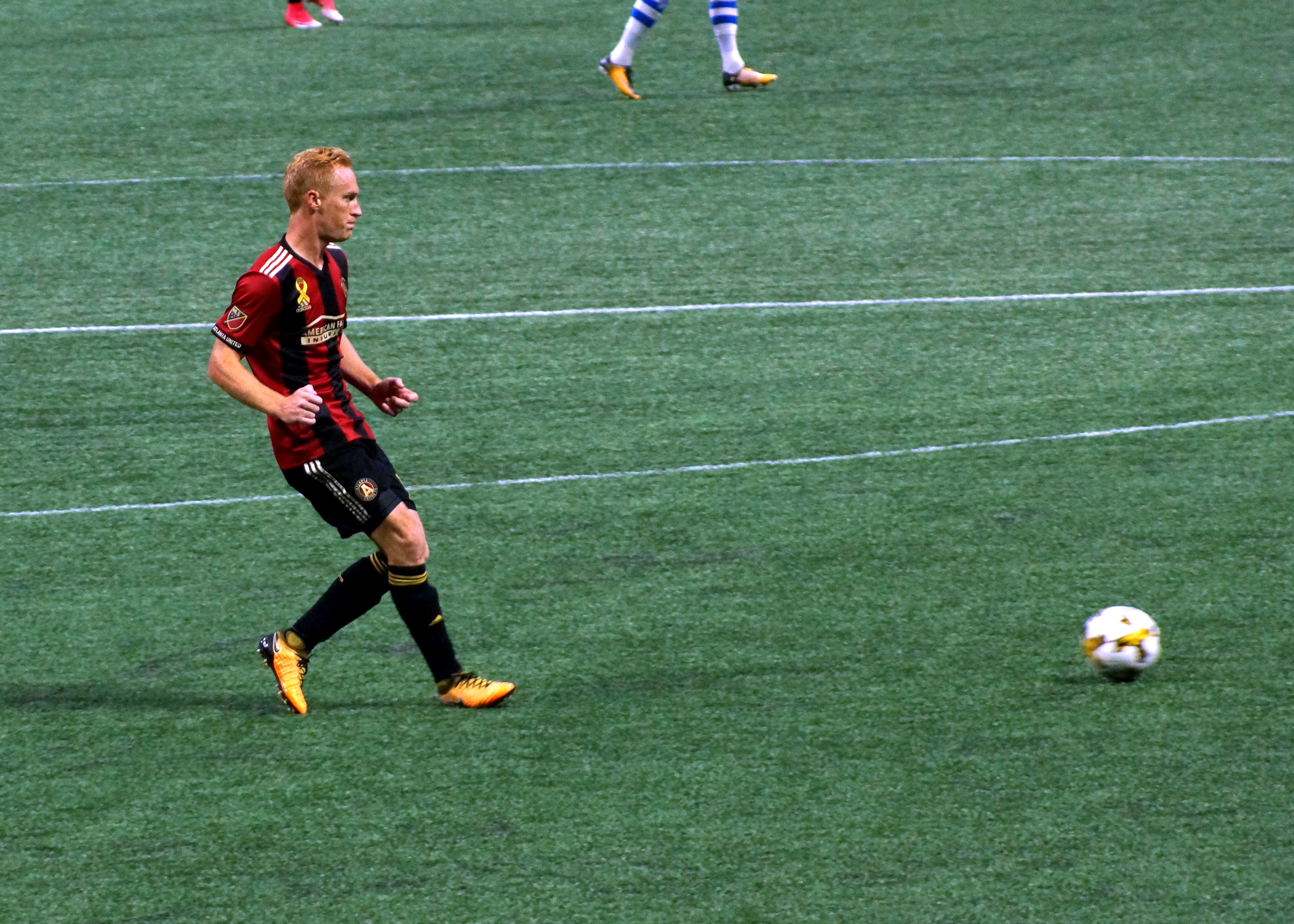
Larentowicz with Atlanta United

Larentowicz signed as a free agent with Atlanta United in December 2016, and began play with the team in their inaugural 2017 season. On September 24, 2017, he scored his first goal for the team in a 2–0 win over Montreal Impact. In December 2017, Larentowicz re-signed again with Atlanta United for the 2018 season. On November 24, 2020, Atlanta United announced the expiration of Larentowicz's contract and that he would not be returning to the roster for the 2021 season.

Larentowicz announced his retirement from professional soccer on April 5, 2021.

== International career ==
In 2010 Larentowicz was called up to the January U.S. national team camp for the first time, but was forced to withdraw due to a knee injury.

He received another call up for the 2011 January camp, and made his international debut in a friendly match against Chile on January 22, statrting and playing the full 90 minutes of the match. On August 25, 2011, Larentowicz was called up for U.S. national team friendlies against Costa Rica and Belgium, he would appear as a late-game substitute for José Francisco Torres against Belgium on September 6, but would not play against Costa Rica.

He was called in to January camp in 2012, and started friendlies against Venezuela on January 21, and appeared as a substitute against Panama on January 25.

== Career statistics ==
=== Club ===
Appearances and goals by club, season and competition
Club	Season	League			Playoffs		U.S. Open Cup		Continental		Total	
Club	Season	Division	Apps	Goals	Apps	Goals	Apps	Goals	Apps	Goals	Apps	Goals
New England Revolution	2005	MLS	1	0	0	0	0	0	—		1	0
New England Revolution	2006	MLS	26	1	4	0	2	0	2 (Note: Appearances in CONCACAF Champions League)	0	34	1
New England Revolution	2007	MLS	28	3	4	0	4	0	—		36	3
New England Revolution	2008	MLS	28	4	2	0	3	0	4 (Note: Appearances in North American Superliga)	0	37	4
New England Revolution	2009	MLS	28	1	2	0	1	1	2	0	33	2
New England Revolution	Total		111	9	12	0	10	1	8	0	141	10
Colorado Rapids	2010	MLS	30	4	4	0	2	0	—		36	4
Colorado Rapids	2011	MLS	34	7	3	0	0	0	4	1	41	8
Colorado Rapids	2012	MLS	32	3	—		1	0	—		33	3
Colorado Rapids	Total		96	14	7	0	3	0	4	1	110	15
Chicago Fire	2013	MLS	32	2	—		4	0	—		36	2
Chicago Fire	2014	MLS	33	6	—		4	1	—		37	7
Chicago Fire	2015	MLS	29	6	—		1	0	—		30	6
Chicago Fire	Total		94	14	0	0	9	1	0	0	103	15
LA Galaxy	2016	MLS	23	1	3	0	4	0	0	0	30	1
Atlanta United FC	2017	MLS	33	1	1	0	1	0	—		35	1
Atlanta United FC	2018	MLS	34	1	4	0	0	0	—		38	1
Atlanta United FC	2019	MLS	27	0	3	0	2	0	4	0	38	0
Atlanta United FC	2020	MLS	19	2	—		0	0	3	0	22	2
Atlanta United FC	Total		113	4	8	0	3	0	7	0	131	3
Career total			437	42	30	0	29	2	19	1	515	45

== Honors ==
New England Revolution

- U.S. Open Cup: 2007
- North American SuperLiga: 2008

Colorado Rapids

- MLS Cup: 2010

Atlanta United

- MLS Cup: 2018
- Campeones Cup: 2019
- U.S. Open Cup: 2019

Individual

- MLS 400 Games Club
