= Stephane Assengue =

Cameroonian footballer

Personal information
- Full name: Stephane Assengue Ombiogno
- Date of birth: May 23, 1990 (age 36)
- Place of birth: Douala, Cameroon
- Height: 5 ft 8 in (1.73 m)
- Position: Forward

Youth career
- Espoir foot Academie

Senior career*
Years	Team	Apps	(Gls)
2007–2009	Daga Young Stars	20	(13)
2009	New England Revolution	2	(0)
2014–2015	Kingston	3	(2)
2016	Mont-Royal Outremont	0	(0)
- * Club domestic league appearances and goals as of May 17, 2017

Stephane Assengue (born May 23, 1990) is a Cameroonian footballer.

== Career ==
Assengue started his career in his native Cameroon with regional team Daga Young Stars before being signed by Major League Soccer side New England Revolution on March 26, 2009.

He made his MLS debut on May 3, 2009, coming on as a second-half substitute for Kheli Dube in a game against Houston Dynamo. He was waived at the end of the 2009 MLS season, having featured in only two games for the Revolution. In 2014, he signed with Kingston FC of the Canadian Soccer League.
