= Sainey Nyassi =

Gambian footballer

Personal information
- Full name: Sainey Nyassi
- Date of birth: 31 January 1989 (age 37)
- Place of birth: Bwiam, Gambia
- Height: 5 ft 9 in (1.75 m)
- Position: Midfielder

Youth career
- 2001–2004: Gambia Ports Authority

Senior career*
| Years | Team | Apps | (Gls) |
| 2004–2007 | Gambia Ports Authority | 82 | (18) |
| 2007–2013 | New England Revolution | 104 | (8) |
| 2013 | D.C. United | 14 | (0) |
| 2014 | RoPS | 19 | (4) |
| 2015–2017 | FC Edmonton | 72 | (5) |

International career
| 2005 | Gambia U17 | 3 | (0) |
| 2007 | Gambia U20 | 4 | (0) |
| 2010–2015 | Gambia | 6 | (2) |
- * Club domestic league appearances and goals as of 4 July 2019

Sainey Nyassi (born 31 January 1989) is a Gambian professional footballer who plays as a midfielder.

== Club career ==
Sainey Nyassi began his career in the Gambia, playing in the GFA League First Division for Gambia Ports Authority.

He was scouted by New England Revolution head coach Steve Nicol while playing in the 2007 FIFA U-20 World Cup, and signed with the Revolution shortly thereafter along with his Gambian teammate, Kenny Mansally.

Nyassi officially signed for the Revolution on August 31, 2007, as a "youth international." He made his MLS debut on 9 September 2007 against D.C. United as a substitute, playing the final eight minutes on the right wing. The appearance would be his only contribution to the 2007 season.

Nyassi made his first start, and scored his first MLS goal, on 29 March 2008 in the Revs' 3-0 2008 opening-day victory over Houston Dynamo. In doing so, he became the youngest Revolution player to ever start a season-opener. His goal won "Sierra Mist Goal of the Week" for week 1. During the 2009 season, he won MLS Goal of the Week in week 3 for his strike against FC Dallas.

As an understudy of Steve Ralston, Nyassi became a core piece of the Revolution for the next four seasons, never playing in fewer than 20 matches for the club until 2012, when he was sidelined with a hamstring injury in early March, returning on June 27. He was released by New England on 16 May 2013.

On 27 May 2013, Nyassi signed with D.C. United.

On 9 June 2014, Nyassi signed for Finnish Club RoPS.

Nyassi signed with FC Edmonton in February 2015. He spent three seasons in Edmonton. After the 2017 season, with the future of FC Edmonton and the NASL in doubt, Nyassi was released by the club.

== International career ==
Nyassi has represented his nation at various youth levels. He played for the Gambian U-17 national team in the 2005 U-17 world championships, and for the U-20 national team in the 2007 U-20 FIFA Championships. He scored his first goal for the Senior national team on 4 September 2010 in the 2012 Africa Cup of Nations qualification match against Namibia.

=== International goals ===
Scores and results list Gambia's goal tally first.

| # | Date | Venue | Opponent | Score | Result | Competition |
|---|---|---|---|---|---|---|
| 1 | 9 January 2010 | Stade El Menzah, Tunis | Tunisia | 2–0 | 2–1 | Friendly |
| 2 | 4 September 2010 | Independence Stadium, Bakau | Namibia | 1–0 | 3–1 | 2012 Africa Cup of Nations qualification |

== Personal life ==
Sainey is the twin brother of fellow professional footballer Sanna Nyassi.

Nyassi received his U.S green card on 31 January 2012, which qualified him as a domestic player for MLS roster purposes.
