= Andy Dorman =

Wales international footballer

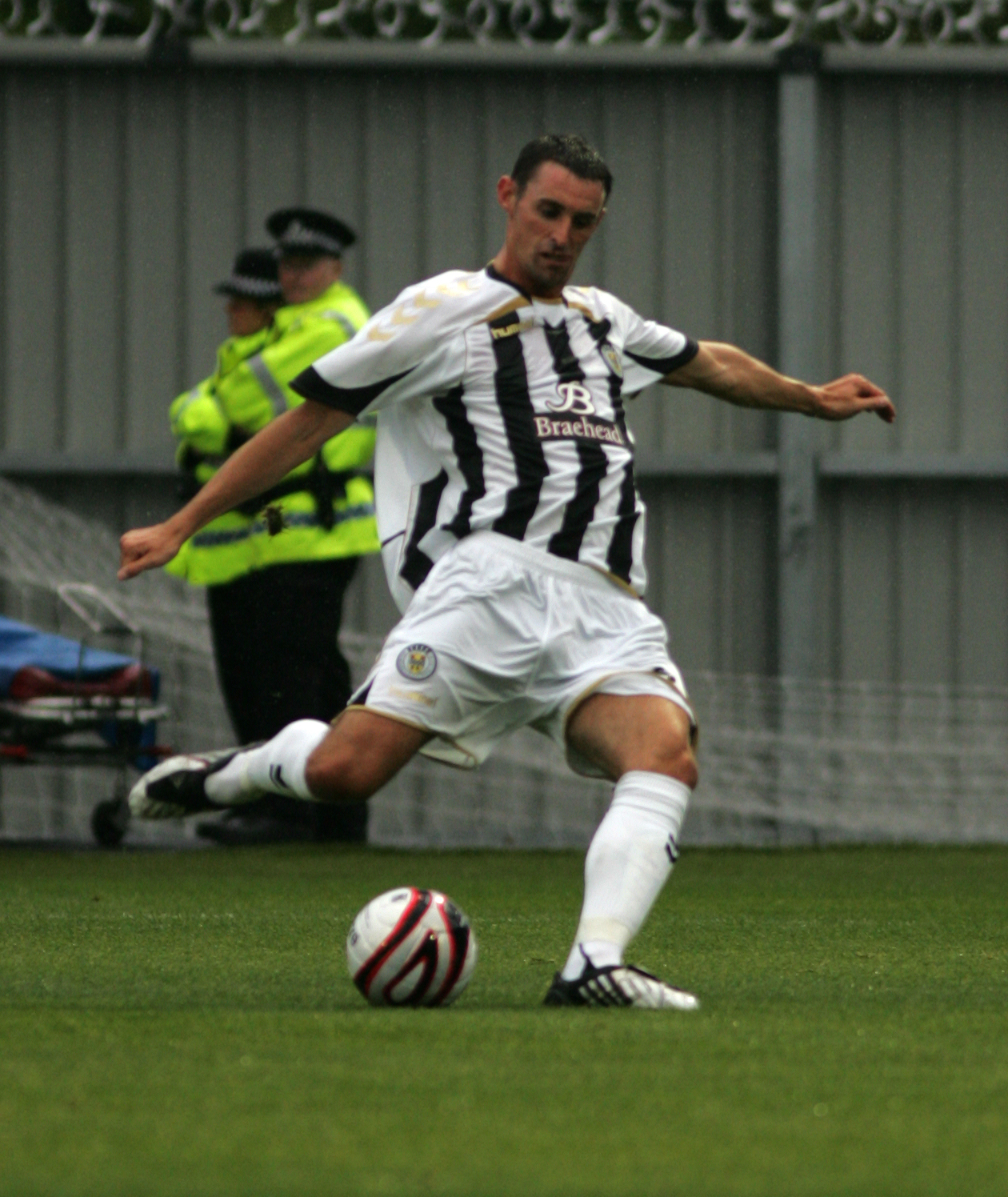
- Dorman playing for St. Mirren in 2009

Personal information
- Date of birth: 1 May 1982 (age 44)
- Place of birth: Chester, England
- Position: Midfielder

College career
Years	Team	Apps	(Gls)
2000–2003	Boston University Terriers		

Senior career*
Years	Team	Apps	(Gls)
2004–2007	New England Revolution	112	(17)
2008–2010	St Mirren	88	(19)
2010–2012	Crystal Palace	21	(1)
2011–2012	→ Bristol Rovers (loan)	25	(2)
2013–2015	New England Revolution	46	(1)
2016–2018	FC Boston	22	(2)
Total		314	(42)

International career
2010–2011	Wales	3	(0)
- * Club domestic league appearances and goals

Andrew Dorman (born 1 May 1982) is a former professional footballer. During his club career, he played as a midfielder for New England Revolution, Crystal Palace and St. Mirren. Born in England, represented the Wales national team.

Born in England of English parents, he grew up in Wales and represented the Wales schools team, eventually gaining full senior international recognition when FIFA amended its rules on eligibility. He has played professionally in the United States, Scotland, and England.

== College ==
Dorman moved to the United States to attend Boston University, where he was a standout for the school's college soccer team.

== Club career ==
=== New England ===
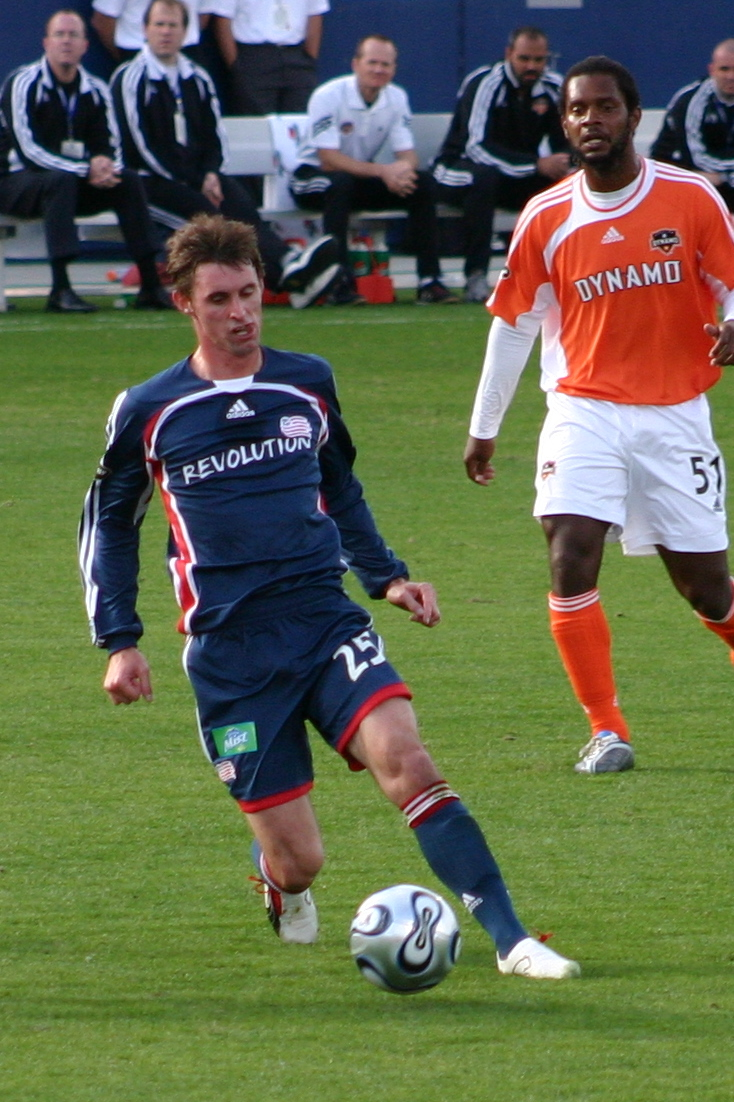
Dorman playing for the New England Revolution in MLS Cup 2006.

After graduating, Dorman was drafted 58th overall in the 2004 MLS SuperDraft by the New England Revolution on 16 January 2004. He succeeded in making the team's 2004 developmental roster, signing as a "Transitional International/ Developmental Player" on 13 April 2004. Dorman made his debut for New England, coming on for Daouda Kanté, in a 3–1 loss against San Jose Earthquakes on 17 April 2004. In his first season with the Revs, Dorman clocked only 365 minutes, but scored two goals and an assist in that time, evincing an attacking flair. Dorman scored his first Revolution goal on 11 August 2004 in a 3-0 win over FC Dallas. He also recorded his first professional assist in the match, setting up Taylor Twellman in the 86th minute. Dorman appeared in all three of the Revolution's 2004 MLS Cup Playoff matches, and provided a game-winning assist on 31 October in the Eastern Conference Semifinal against the Columbus Crew.

In 2005, Dorman made 30 appearances, and came on as a substitute in MLS Cup 2005 on 11 November.

The 2006 season was a break-out year for Dorman, as he played in all 32 games for the Revs (starting all 32), scoring six goals and recording a career-high ten assists. Soccer America named Dorman the third-best attacking midfielder in MLS for 2006. During a season when many Revolution players missed time due to injury, suspension, or international duty, Dorman was forced to play many roles and positions. His diligence and creativity on the attack gained the attention and respect of many around the league, and he was named the 2006 "Man of the Year" by the Midnight Riders, the Revolution's independent supporters group. In the 2006 MLS Cup Playoffs, Dorman started all four of the Revs' games, providing an assist on Taylor Twellman's goal against Chicago in the second game of the Eastern Conference Semifinal.

In 2007, Dorman made 30 appearances for the Revs, scoring a career-high seven goals and notching two assists. On 23 June, Dorman had his first-ever multi-goal game, recording a brace against Toronto FC. He made his 100th MLS career appearance on 2 August against the Kansas City Wizards. On 3 October, Dorman played the entirety of the 2007 U.S. Open Cup final, helping the Revolution win their first-ever championship.

Although Dorman wanted to re-sign with New England in MLS, contract negotiations fell through.

=== St Mirren ===
Dorman signed with Scottish Premier League outfit St Mirren. Upon joining St Mirren, teammate Jay Heaps said Dorman was "world class." One year on, Dorman revealed upon signing for St Mirren, he did not know the location of the club (Paisley). He made his debut during a home league match against Motherwell on 19 January 2008, and provided an early assist in a 3–1 victory. Dorman then scored a winning goal in a Scottish Cup replay against Dundee United and he also scored against them in a 1–1 draw one month later.

His performances for St Mirren during 2008–09 led to many teams watching Dorman with a view to bringing him into their side. Teams known to be interested included Sheffield United and Bolton Wanderers. Dorman's contract with St Mirren included a club option of an extra year, which was exercised in March 2009 after he was voted Scottish Premier League player of the month for February 2009 and another player of the month for April 2009. Dorman spoke out about his transfer speculation, stating that he doesn't pay attention to the rumours and insists he's happy at St Mirren, while manager Gus MacPherson said he would only let Dorman leave for £1 million. Dorman finished the season as St Mirren's joint top scorer (with Billy Mehmet) with 12 goals each.

However, the following season, Dorman couldn't re-produce his form of the previous campaign and was unable to rediscover his goalscoring form; but still, other clubs were tracking him; like Championship side Watford. Shortly after the transfer headlines, Dorman suffered a hamstring injury, ruling him out for six weeks after coming off in the first half in a 3–1 loss against Celtic. In the next meeting against Celtic on 24 March 2010, Dorman scored a brace in a 4–0 win. After the match, MacPherson praised the players, including Dorman, himself. In mid April, Dorman scored three goals in the three games, including against Falkirk, St Johnstone and Kilmarnock. Dorman finished the season as St Mirren's league top scorer, with Billy Mehmet with 12 goals each in all appearances. At the end of the season, Dorman announced his intention to leave St Mirren, ending a two-year association with the club, with Championship side Portsmouth keen to sign him.

=== Crystal Palace ===
After his contract at St Mirren expired, Dorman made the move to England to join Championship side Crystal Palace. On the opening day of the season, Dorman made his debut in a 3–2 win over Leicester City; two-months later, Dorman scored his first goal in a 4–3 loss against Preston. However, he made a slow start to life with the Eagles and soon dropped out of the Palace first-team after the sacking of George Burley, although Burley's successor Dougie Freedman said out of favour players Dorman and Owen Garvan did have a future.

On 31 August 2012, Dorman's contract was terminated by mutual consent, despite it being expected to end the next season.

=== Loan at Bristol Rovers ===
His second season in south London saw him limited to appearances for Palace's reserve team, and so Dorman made the move to League Two side Bristol Rovers on a loan deal in November 2011. Following his signing, he admitted that he thought that the club were still in League One. He made his debut for Rovers on 12 November in the FA Cup 3–1 win against Corby Town; Seven days later, Dorman made his league debut for the club in a 2–0 loss against Barnet. Dorman had initially signed until 2 January, which was extended by a further month. On 27 January 2012, he signed for the rest of the season, along with four other players. On 25 February 2012, Dorman scored his first goal in a 1–0 win over Rotherham United After scoring his first goal, Dorman spoke out about his frustration at wanting to get playing time after having his career revived at Bristol Rovers. Dorman also said he had experienced playing under three different managers during his loan spell, but saw the positive side of this. Towards the end of the season, Dorman scored his second goal in a 5–1 win over Accrington Stanley. After his loan spell at Bristol Rovers, Dorman did not rule out returning to the club after clarifying his future with Crystal Palace.

=== Return to New England ===
Dorman re-signed with New England Revolution on 15 November 2012, playing for his former teammate Jay Heaps. He made 12 appearances (3 starts) during the 2013 New England Revolution season, recording an assist in the Revolution's 3-2 victory over the Columbus Crew on 19 October, and helping the Revolution return to the playoffs for the first time since 2009. Dorman received two straight red cards during the 2013 campaign, on 10 August against Sporting Kansas City, and on 5 October against the Red Bulls,

He started both of the Revolution's playoff matches against Sporting Kansas City in the Eastern Conference Semifinals, scoring in the 55th minute of the first match to give the Revolution a 1-0 lead.

Dorman managed to make 16 appearances in the 2014 New England Revolution season despite being sidelined with an MCL injury on 15 July which kept him out of the team until 12 September. He recorded one assist in the Revolution's 3-1 loss to the Philadelphia Union on 28 June. He also made 3 appearances in the Revolution's 2014 playoff run, which ultimately culminated in a loss to the LA Galaxy in the 2014 MLS Cup Final.

In 2015, Dorman made 18 appearances for the Revolution. He scored the Revolution's only goal in a 4-1 loss to the New York Red Bulls on 11 July. The goal was Dorman's first for the Revolution in regular-season play since 14 July 2007. Dorman's contract expired at the end of the 2015 season, and he joined the coaching staff of the Boston Bolts.

== International career ==
Although he was born in England of English parents, Dorman grew up in Wales, and represented the Welsh schools team. He expressed interest in either playing for England, Wales or gaining American citizenship and playing for the United States, having lived there for over seven years. Dorman had moved to America to attend Boston University, where he was named a two-time All-New England player.

Although Dorman considers himself to be Welsh, he was not eligible to play for Wales as he was born in England and none of his parents or grandparents were born in Wales. In October 2009, however, FIFA ratified changes which allow players with 5 years compulsory education in a country before the age of 16 to represent that country, which made Dorman eligible to represent Wales. Dorman was included in the squad to play against Scotland on 14 November 2009 when, ironically, he was playing his club football for Scottish team St Mirren. Wales won 3–0, but he stayed on the bench for the whole game. Dorman made his debut for the Wales national football team on 23 May 2010 against Croatia at the Stadion Gradski.

== Personal life ==
Dorman has said his idol is Michael Owen. He attended Hawarden High School where Owen and the late Gary Speed also attended.

His brother is fellow player Richie Dorman.

Dorman holds a US green card which qualifies him as a domestic player for MLS roster purposes.

== Honours ==
New England Revolution

- U.S. Open Cup (1): 2007
- Supporter's Player of the Year: 2006

St Mirren

- Scottish League Cup runner-up: 2009–10
- Renfrewshire Cup (2): 2008–09, 2009–10
- Scottish Premier League Player of the Month: March 2009
