= Wells Thompson =

American soccer player

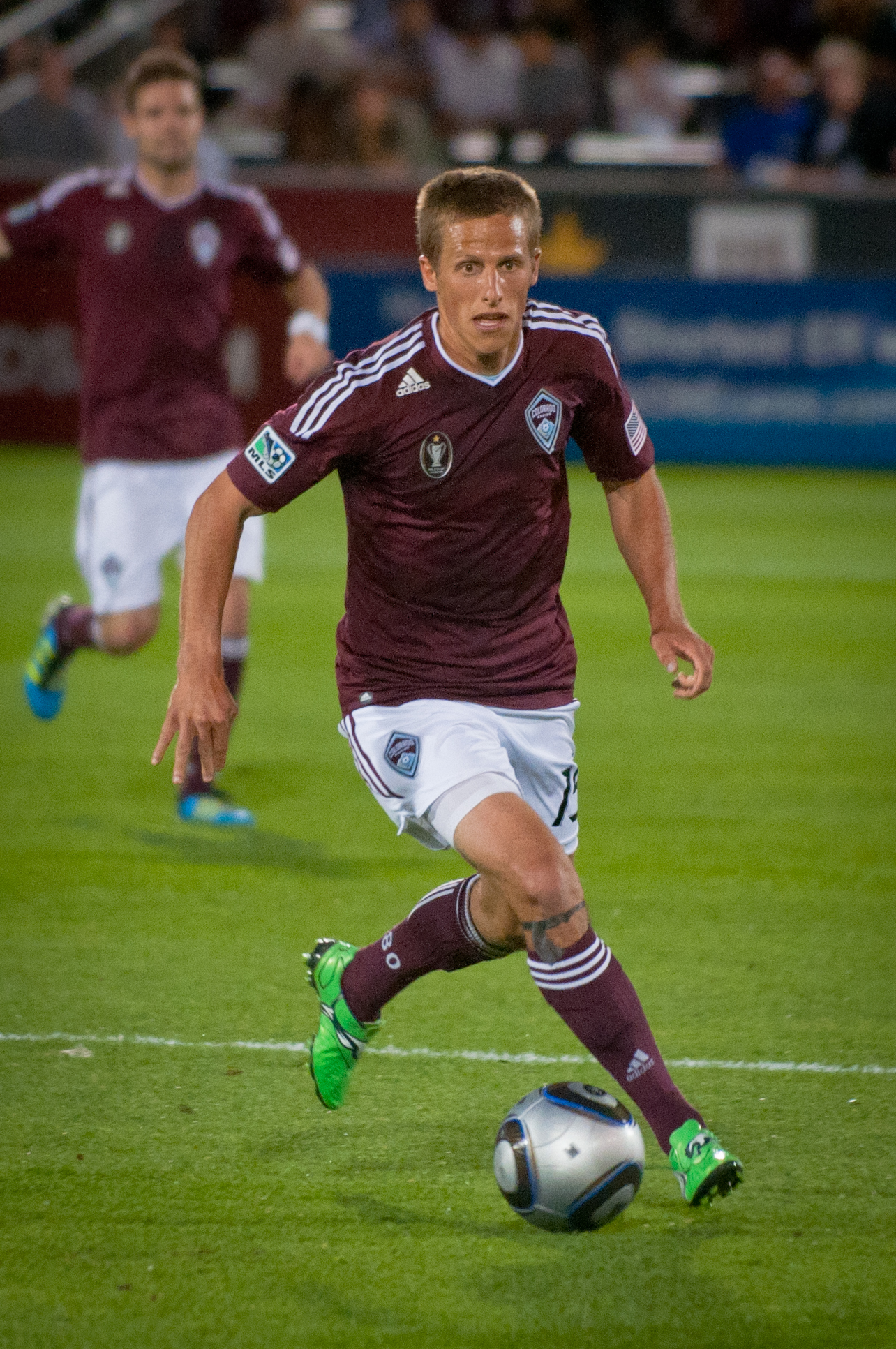
- Thompson in 2011 with the Colorado Rapids

Personal information
- Full name: Thomas Wells Thompson
- Date of birth: November 25, 1983 (age 42)
- Place of birth: Winston-Salem, North Carolina, United States
- Height: 5 ft 10 in (1.78 m)
- Position: Midfielder

College career
Years	Team	Apps	(Gls)
2003–2006	Wake Forest Demon Deacons	56	(9)

Senior career*
Years	Team	Apps	(Gls)
2005–2006	Carolina Dynamo	29	(2)
2007–2009	New England Revolution	71	(2)
2010–2012	Colorado Rapids	75	(5)
2012–2013	Chicago Fire	12	(0)
2014	Charlotte Eagles	25	(6)
2015	Carolina RailHawks	16	(0)
- * Club domestic league appearances and goals as of October 30, 2015

Thomas Wells Thompson (born November 25, 1983, in Winston-Salem, North Carolina) is a retired American soccer player who last played as a midfielder for Carolina RailHawks in the North American Soccer League (NASL).

== Career ==
=== High school and College ===
Thompson attended R.J. Reynolds High School, Forsyth Country Day School (aka, FCDS), and the Family Foundation School. He earned an All-North Carolina first team selection as a junior and senior as well as an all-conference and all-region selection. After graduating from FCDS, he attended Wake Forest University where he played college soccer for four years. During his college years Thompson also played with Carolina Dynamo in the USL Premier Development League.

=== Professional ===
==== New England Revolution ====
Thompson was drafted in the first round (fifth overall) in the 2007 MLS SuperDraft by New England Revolution on January 12, 2007. He officially signed with the club on February 2, 2007. Thompson made his Revolution debut in the opener of the 2007 New England Revolution season, a 1-0 loss to the Chicago Fire on April 7. He made his home debut the following week in the Revolution's home opener on April 14, in a 4-0 win over Toronto FC. He scored his first MLS goal on May 6 in a 3-1 home victory over the Chicago Fire. In his rookie campaign, Thompson made 27 regular season appearances, and started all four of the Revolution's playoff matches, providing a game-winning assist in the 2007 Eastern Conference final, setting up Taylor Twellman's famous bicycle kick. Thompson also started MLS Cup 2007, and helped the Revolution win their first-ever piece of silverware, the 2007 Lamar Hunt U.S. Open Cup, scoring the game-winning goal in the final.

In 2008, Thompson made 19 appearances for the club, recording one assist, and appearing in a substitute in both of the Revolution's playoff matches. He also helped the club win their first piece of international silverware, the 2008 North American SuperLiga.

In 2009, Thompson played in 25 matches, making 17 starts, scoring a goal and recording two assists. He also appeared in both of the Revolution's playoff matches. Thompson won MLS Goal of the Week honors in week 24 for his goal against San Jose Earthquakes on August 19.

==== Colorado Rapids ====
On January 22, 2010, the Revolution traded Thompson to the Colorado Rapids along with Jeff Larentowicz in exchange for a third-round pick in the 2011 MLS SuperDraft, Preston Burpo and Cory Gibbs. On April 14, 2010, Thompson scored his first two goals for Colorado in a 2–1 victory over Kansas City Wizards in a 2010 Lamar Hunt U.S. Open Cup qualification match.

Thompson made 27 regular season appearances for Colorado in 2010, including 13 starts, scoring 2 goals. His first goal in MLS regular season play came against his former club, the New England Revolution, on September 18. He started two matches in the 2010 MLS Cup Playoffs, and appeared as a 90th minute substitute in MLS Cup 2010, which Colorado won.

Thompson was named the Rapids' 2011 Humanitarian of the Year, and was one of only two players to appear in all six of the club's 2011 CONCACAF Champions League matches.

==== Chicago Fire ====
He was traded to the Chicago Fire after asking for a trade. Thompson made 4 appearances for the Fire in the 2012 campaign, and played in 8 games in 2013, earning his first start on March 24, 2013. Thompson's aggressive on-field play has earned him the nickname "El Diablo". At the end of 2013 season the club did not renew Thompson's contract.

==== Charlotte Eagles ====
Thompson signed with USL Pro club Charlotte Eagles on March 3, 2014.

==== Carolina RailHawks ====
After Charlotte Eagle's move down to the USL PDL, Thompson signed with Carolina RailHawks on February 3, 2015.

== Honors ==
=== New England Revolution ===
- Lamar Hunt U.S. Open Cup (1): 2007
- Major League Soccer Eastern Conference Championship (1): 2007
- North American SuperLiga (1): 2008

=== Colorado Rapids ===
- Major League Soccer Eastern Conference Championship (1): 2010
- Major League Soccer MLS Cup (1): 2010
