= Matt Tanzini =

American soccer player

Personal information
- Full name: Matthew Tanzini
- Date of birth: June 3, 1976 (age 50)
- Place of birth: Binghamton, NY, United States
- Height: 5 ft 8 in (1.73 m)
- Position: Midfielder

Senior career*
Years	Team	Apps	(Gls)
2000–2003	Harrisburg Heat (indoor)	72	(28)
2004–2007	Harrisburg City Islanders	46	(12)
- * Club domestic league appearances and goals

Matthew "Matt" Tanzini (born June 3, 1976, in Binghamton, New York) is an American soccer attacking midfielder.

Tanzini started his career with West Virginia University, spent three seasons with the Harrisburg Heat. During the 2000–2001 season, the Heat played in the indoor National Professional Soccer League. In 2001, the NSPL was restructured and became the Major Indoor Soccer League. Tanzini then spent two seasons with the Heat in MISL. In 2003, he signed for the Kansas City Comets, but left to join outdoor side Harrisburg City Islanders before playing a match. He then played four seasons with the Islanders before leaving at the end of the 2007 season.
