= Kheli Dube =

Zimbabwean footballer (born 1983)

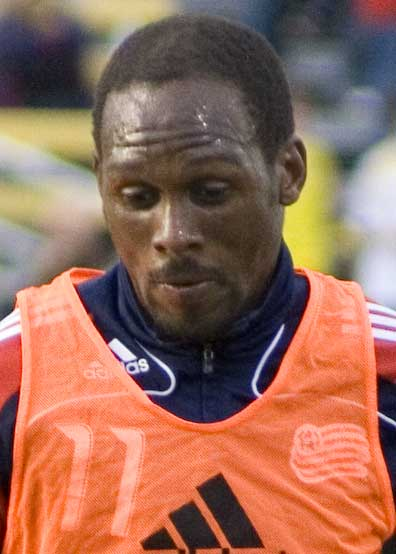

Personal information
- Full name: Mkhokheli Dube
- Date of birth: 18 June 1983 (age 43)
- Place of birth: Bulawayo, Zimbabwe
- Height: 6 ft 1 in (1.85 m)
- Position: Forward

Youth career
- 2000–2002: Zimbabwe Saints
- 2004–2005: Lindsey Wilson Blue Raiders
- 2006–2007: Coastal Carolina Chanticleers

Senior career*
Years	Team	Apps	(Gls)
2003	Highlanders		
2005	Michigan Bucks	16	(10)
2006	Delaware Dynasty	5	(4)
2006–2007	Michigan Bucks	25	(15)
2008–2011	New England Revolution	72	(14)
2012	Chicago Fire	0	(0)
2012	AmaZulu	5	(0)

International career^{‡}
- Zimbabwe U-20
- Zimbabwe U-23
- * Club domestic league appearances and goals as of 15 November 2012 ‡ National team caps and goals as of 3 April 2009

Mkhokheli "Kheli" Dube (born 18 June 1983 in Bulawayo) is a Zimbabwean footballer.

== Career ==
=== Early career and college ===
Dube played in the youth system of his hometown team, Dunlop and played professionally for two years in the Zimbabwe Premier Soccer League for Highlanders before coming to the United States.

He played college soccer for Lindsey Wilson College during his freshman and sophomore seasons, scoring 36 goals and tallying 13 assists in 50 games. After his sophomore season, he transferred to Coastal Carolina University for his junior and senior seasons, where he scored 16 goals and had 12 assists in 26 games. He missed the first five weeks of his senior season with an injury, but still scored 11 goals. He is a two-time All-Big South performer and was a member of the 2006 Big South All-Tournament Team. He was also the 2007 Big South Conference Player of the Year and a NSCAA All-South Atlantic performer.He was Big South Conference player of the week a record four times in his senior season.

During his college years Dube also played with both Michigan Bucks and Delaware Dynasty of the USL Premier Development League, helping the Bucks reach the PDL championship game both in 2006 (when they also won the title) and 2007.

=== Professional ===
==== New England Revolution ====
Dube was drafted 8th in the 2008 MLS Supplemental Draft by New England Revolution on 24 January 2008. He made his debut for the Revs on 29 March 2008 as an 81st-minute substitute for Kenny Mansally in their home opener, a 3-0 victory over Houston Dynamo.

While Dube was not initially expected to play a major role with the Revolution, a long-term injury to Taylor Twellman gave him an opportunity to start a number of games, with his first start coming on 17 May, a 2-0 win over the San Jose Earthquakes. Six minutes into that match, Dube scored his first MLS goal. He would go on to score several more goals in the following months, including the winning goal in the Revs' SuperLiga match against Santos Laguna.

Dube was runner-up to Los Angeles Galaxy defender Sean Franklin for 2008 MLS Rookie of the Year.

In the 2009 season, Dube scored his first career hat-trick on 23 August 2009 in a 3-1 victory over Real Salt Lake and was voted for his first player of the week award the same week (matchweek 23). His ten goals across all competitions in 2009 made him the team's top scorer for the season.

In the 2010 season, Dube recorded a career-high 5 assists, additionally adding 2 goals. He finished the season as the club's assist leader.

Dube made only 5 appearances in the 2011 season, and on 30 November New England declined his 2012 contract option.

==== Later career ====
Dube entered the 2011 MLS Re-Entry Draft. He was selected by Chicago Fire in stage two of the draft on 12 December 2011. Dube signed with Chicago on 25 January 2012. After spending a six-month term without making an appearance, he was waived on 26 June.

On 7 August 2012, Dube joined South African Premier Soccer League side AmaZulu on a three-year deal.

In 2013, in an effort to be closer to his family, Dube joined Chicken Inn F.C. in Zimbabwe, and won the Net One Charity Cup. 2 and half years later, he moved to join Bulawayo City in 2016 where he captained the ambitious side under Philani 'Beffy" Ncube. Halfway through the 2017 season he made a move to FC Platinum where he won the Championship in 3 successive seasons 2017, 2018 and 2019, also winning the Castle Challenge Cup twice in 2018 and 19. Recently returned to his boyhood club at Highlanders Fc for the 2020 season.

=== International ===
Dube has represented his country with the under 20 and under 23 national teams, but has yet to make his debut for the full Zimbabwe national football team.

== Personal ==
Dube received his U.S. green card in 2010.

== Honors ==
Highlanders FC

- PSL league: 2000, 2001, 2002

Lindsey Wilson

- NAIA National Championship: 2005

Michigan Bucks

- USL Premier Development League: 2006

New England Revolution

- North American SuperLiga: 2008

Chicken INN

- NetOne Charity Shield: 2013

FC Platinum

- Zimbabwean PSL Championship: 2017, 2018, 2019
- Castle Challenge Cup: 2017, 2018
