= Amaechi Igwe =

American soccer player

Personal information
- Full name: Amaechi Dominic Igwe
- Date of birth: May 20, 1988 (age 38)
- Place of birth: Belmont, California, United States
- Height: 6 ft 0 in (1.83 m)
- Position: Defender

Youth career
- 2004–2005: IMG Soccer Academy
- 2006: Santa Clara Broncos

Senior career*
Years	Team	Apps	(Gls)
2007–2009	New England Revolution	22	(0)
2010–2011	FC Ingolstadt 04	0	(0)
2011–2012	SV Babelsberg 03	18	(0)

International career^{‡}
2004–2006	United States U17	15	(5)
2006–2008	United States U20	20	(1)
- * Club domestic league appearances and goals as of 22:02, June 29, 2012 (UTC) ‡ National team caps and goals as of April 3, 2009

Amaechi Dominic Igwe (born May 20, 1988) is an American retired professional soccer player who played as a defender.

== Career ==
=== College ===
Born in Belmont, California, Igwe played college soccer at Santa Clara University before signing a generation Adidas contract with Major League Soccer.

=== Professional ===
Igwe was drafted in the first round, 12th overall in the 2007 MLS SuperDraft by New England Revolution. On May 21, 2010, he signed with German club FC Ingolstadt 04. Igwe suffered an injury during a preseason match and was sidelined for the entire 2010–11 season. Igwe and FC Ingolstadt came to an agreement and he left the club with a year left on his contract to spend the 2011–12 season with SV Babelsberg 03.

=== International ===
Igwe was a member of the U.S. Soccer residency program in Bradenton, Florida from 2004 to 2005. He represented the U17 Youth National Team in the World Championships in Peru. He also represented the U20 Men's National Team in Canada after being named to the US squad for the 2007 FIFA U-20 World Cup.
