= 2003 San Jose Earthquakes season =

San Jose Earthquakes
2003 season
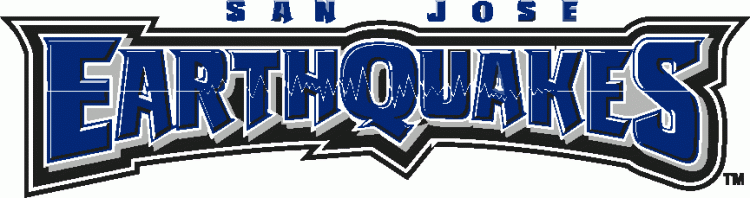
- Owner: AEG
- Coach: Frank Yallop
- Stadium: Spartan Stadium
- Major League Soccer: Conference: 1st Overall: 2nd
- MLS Cup: Champions
- U.S. Open Cup: Fourth round
- CONCACAF: First round
- California Clásico: 2nd
- Top goalscorer: Landon Donovan (12)
- Average home league attendance: 12,796
Home colors	Away colors

The 2003 San Jose Earthquakes season was the eighth season of the team's existence, and saw the franchise win its second MLS Cup. To date, this is the most recent MLS Cup final appearance or victory for the team, the longest such drought in the league (taking into account the franchise being inactive for two seasons in 2006-07).

== Squad ==
=== Current squad ===
As of December 26, 2012. Note: Flags indicate national team as defined under FIFA eligibility rules; some limited exceptions apply. Players may hold more than one non-FIFA nationality.

No.	Pos.	Nation	Player
1	GK	USA	Jon Conway
2	DF	USA	Eddie Robinson
4	MF	USA	Chris Roner
5	MF	USA	Ramiro Corrales
6	FW	DEN	Ronnie Ekelund
7	MF	USA	Ian Russell
8	DF	USA	Richard Mulrooney
9	MF	USA	Brian Mullan
10	FW	USA	Landon Donovan
11	MF	USA	Manny Lagos
12	DF	USA	Jeff Agoos
13	FW	USA	Jamil Walker

No.	Pos.	Nation	Player
14	MF	CAN	Dwayne De Rosario
15	MF	USA	Roger Levesque
16	DF	USA	Craig Waibel
17	DF	USA	Todd Dunivant
18	GK	CAN	Pat Onstad
19	DF	USA	Troy Dayak
22	FW	BRA	Rodrigo Faria
25	FW	USA	Brian Ching
26	FW	USA	Arturo Alvarez
29	MF	USA	Johanes Maliza
30	GK	USA	Josh Saunders

== Club ==
=== Management ===
Position	Staff
General Manager	(United States) Johnny Moore
Head Coach	(Canada) Frank Yallop
Assistant Coach	(United States) Dominic Kinnear
Goalkeeper Coach	(New Zealand) Tim Hanely
Head trainer	(United States) Bruce Morgan
Equipment manager	(El Salvador) Jose Vega

Last updated: April 18, 2009
Source: San Jose Earthquakes

=== Other information ===
Owner	(United States) Earthquakes Soccer, LLC
Ground (capacity and dimensions)	Spartan Stadium (26,525 / 71x110 yards)

Source: San Jose Earthquakes

== Competitions ==
=== Major League Soccer ===
==== Matches ====
April 12, 2003	Colorado Rapids	1–2	San Jose Earthquakes	Denver
	Roberts 46'	Report	Ching 1'; Dunivant 22'	Stadium: Invesco Field; Attendance: 20,816

April 19, 2003	San Jose Earthquakes	1–1 (OT)	Kansas City Wizards	San Jose, California
	Mullan 81'	Report	own goal 74'	Stadium: Spartan Stadium; Attendance: 17,032

April 26, 2003	San Jose Earthquakes	1–0	Los Angeles Galaxy	San Jose, California
	Donovan 54'	Report		Stadium: Spartan Stadium; Attendance: 9,187

May 3, 2003	New England Revolution	0–2	San Jose Earthquakes	Foxborough, Massachusetts
		Report	own goal 42'; Ching 56'	Stadium: Gillette Stadium; Attendance: 13,722

May 10, 2003	Chicago Fire	0–0 (OT)	San Jose Earthquakes	Chicago
		Report		Stadium: Soldier Field; Attendance: 7,825

May 17, 2003	San Jose Earthquakes	4–3	Columbus Crew	San Jose, California
	Mullan 30'; Ching 49'; Agoos 67'; Donovan 87'	Report	McBride 38'; Cunningham 61'; Paule 90'	Stadium: Spartan Stadium; Attendance: 7,180

May 31, 2003	San Jose Earthquakes	1–4	Chicago Fire	San Jose, California
	Roner 59'	Report	Beasley 28'; Ralph 47'; Razov 81'; Beasley 90'	Stadium: Spartan Stadium; Attendance: 7,401

June 7, 2003	Columbus Crew	1–0	San Jose Earthquakes	Columbus, Ohio
	McBride 85'	Report		Stadium: Columbus Crew Stadium; Attendance: 16,481

June 14, 2003	Dallas Burn	1–2	San Jose Earthquakes	Southlake, Texas
	Kreis 25'	Report	Mullan 49'; Alvarez 87'	Stadium: Dragon Stadium; Attendance: 7,601

June 18, 2003	Los Angeles Galaxy	1–1 (OT)	San Jose Earthquakes	Carson, California
	Victorine 21'	Report	Walker 63'	Stadium: Home Depot Center; Attendance: 13,867

June 21, 2003	San Jose Earthquakes	2–1	Columbus Crew	San Jose, California
	Mullan 43'; Walker 77'	Report	McBride 55'	Stadium: Spartan Stadium; Attendance: 8,058

June 28, 2003	San Jose Earthquakes	0–0 (OT)	Kansas City Wizards	San Jose, California
		Report		Stadium: Spartan Stadium; Attendance: 7,817

July 2, 2003	MetroStars	4–4 (OT)	San Jose Earthquakes	East Rutherford, New Jersey
	Guevara 7'; Magee 36'; Mathis 43'; Mathis 90'	Report	Ching 15'; Ching 34'; Lagos 78'; Donovan 90'	Stadium: Giants Stadium; Attendance: 14,875

July 5, 2003	San Jose Earthquakes	0–0 (OT)	Chicago Fire	San Jose, California
		Report		Stadium: Spartan Stadium; Attendance: 7,705

July 12, 2003	San Jose Earthquakes	0–2	Colorado Rapids	San Jose, California
		Report	Kotschau 34'; Chung 49'	Stadium: Spartan Stadium; Attendance: 8,107

July 19, 2003	D.C. United	1–2	San Jose Earthquakes	Washington, D.C.
	Curtis 13'	Report	Roner 38'; Lagos 54'	Stadium: RFK Stadium; Attendance: 21,892

July 26, 2003	San Jose Earthquakes	3–0	Dallas Burn	San Jose, California
	Mullan 25'; Lagos 37'; Agoos 90'	Report		Stadium: Spartan Stadium; Attendance: 9,034

August 8, 2003	Kansas City Wizards	0–1	San Jose Earthquakes	Kansas City, Missouri
		Report	Donovan 23'	Stadium: Arrowhead Stadium; Attendance: 13,819

August 13, 2003	Dallas Burn	0–3	San Jose Earthquakes	Southlake, Texas
		Report	Ching 11'; Donovan 23'; Donovan 44'	Stadium: Dragon Stadium; Attendance: 5,515

August 16, 2003	New England Revolution	1–1 (OT)	San Jose Earthquakes	Foxborough, Massachusetts
	Twellman 52'	Report	Ekelund 23'	Stadium: Gillette Stadium; Attendance: 14,877

August 24, 2003	San Jose Earthquakes	1–0	D.C. United	San Jose, California
	Corrales 80'	Report		Stadium: Spartan Stadium; Attendance: 13,107

August 30, 2003	San Jose Earthquakes	1–2	Colorado Rapids	San Jose, California
	Mullan 59'	Report	Chung 21'; Spencer 67'	Stadium: Spartan Stadium; Attendance: 10,116

September 7, 2003	San Jose Earthquakes	2–1	New England Revolution	San Jose, California
	De Rosario 42'; Donovan 52'	Report	Noonan 41'	Stadium: Spartan Stadium; Attendance: 13,510

September 13, 2003	D.C. United	2–1	San Jose Earthquakes	Washington, D.C.
	Stewart 9'; Olsen 81'	Report	Walker 80'	Stadium: RFK Stadium; Attendance: 15,502

September 20, 2003	Kansas City Wizards	1–4	San Jose Earthquakes	Kansas City, Missouri
	Arnaud 59'	Report	Donovan 26'; Robinson 54'; Donovan 70'; Donovan 90'	Stadium: Arrowhead Stadium; Attendance: 30,308

September 27, 2003	San Jose Earthquakes	5–2	Dallas Burn	San Jose, California
	De Rosario 1'; De Rosario 11'; Donovan 24'; Donovan 35'; De Rosario 48'	Report	Hendrickson 8'; Curtis 14'	Stadium: Spartan Stadium; Attendance: 12,219

October 5, 2003	San Jose Earthquakes	0–2	MetroStars	San Jose, California
		Report	Guevara 30'; Jolley 90'	Stadium: Spartan Stadium; Attendance: 10,225

October 10, 2003	Colorado Rapids	0–0 (OT)	San Jose Earthquakes	Denver
		Report		Stadium: Invesco Field; Attendance: 12,478

October 18, 2003	Los Angeles Galaxy	3–0	San Jose Earthquakes	Carson, California
	Moreno 6'; Moreno 35'; Elliott 61'	Report		Stadium: Home Depot Center; Attendance: 27,000

October 25, 2003	San Jose Earthquakes	1–1 (OT)	Los Angeles Galaxy	San Jose, California
	Walker 80'	Report	Moreno 56'	Stadium: Spartan Stadium; Attendance: 16,282

(OT) = Overtime

=== MLS Cup Playoffs ===
November 1, 2003 Conference Semifinal	Los Angeles Galaxy	2–0	San Jose Earthquakes	Carson, California
	Victorine 59'; Ruiz 62'	Report		Stadium: Home Depot Center; Attendance: 20,201

November 9, 2003 Conference Semifinal	San Jose Earthquakes	5–2 (OT) (5–4 agg.)	Los Angeles Galaxy	San Jose, California
	Agoos 21'; Donovan 35'; Walker 50'; Roner 90'; Faria 96'	Report	Ruiz 7'; Vagenas 13'	Stadium: Spartan Stadium; Attendance: 14,145

November 15, 2003 Conference Final	San Jose Earthquakes	3–2 (OT)	Kansas City Wizards	San Jose, California
	Lagos 61'; Mullan 83'; Donovan 117'	Report	Simutenkov 57'; Klein 72'	Stadium: Spartan Stadium; Attendance: 16,108

=== MLS Cup ===
November 23, 2003 MLS Cup	Chicago Fire	2–4	San Jose Earthquakes	Carson, California
	Beasley 49' own goal 54'	Report	Ekelund 5'; Donovan 38'; Mulrooney 50'; Donovan 71'	Stadium: Home Depot Center; Attendance: 27,000

=== U.S. Open Cup ===
August 5, 2003 Fourth round	Seattle Sounders	1–0	San Jose Earthquakes	Seattle, Washington
	Smith 41'	Report		Stadium: Husky Soccer Stadium; Attendance: 2,510

=== CONCACAF Champions Cup ===
March 16, 2003 First round	Municipal (Guatemala)	4–2	(United States) San Jose Earthquakes	Guatemala City, Guatemala
	Romero 28'; Romero 37'; Figueroa 39'; Ponciano 55'	Report	Lagos 64'; Lagos 71'	Stadium: Estadio Mateo Flores; Attendance: 12,000 (est.)

March 26, 2003 First round	San Jose Earthquakes (United States)	2–1 (4–5 agg.)	(Guatemala) Municipal	San Jose, California
	Donovan 19'; Ching 35'	Report	Plata 76'	Stadium: Spartan Stadium; Attendance: 4,594

==== Standings ====
Pos	Team	Pld	W	L	T	GF	GA	GD	Pts	Qualification
1	San Jose Earthquakes	30	14	7	9	45	35	+10	51	MLS Cup Playoffs
2	Kansas City Wizards	30	11	10	9	48	44	+4	42	MLS Cup Playoffs
3	Colorado Rapids	30	11	12	7	40	45	−5	40	MLS Cup Playoffs
4	Los Angeles Galaxy	30	9	12	9	35	35	0	36	MLS Cup Playoffs
5	Dallas Burn	30	6	19	5	35	64	−29	23	

Source: MLS
