= 2005 San Jose Earthquakes season =

San Jose Earthquakes
2005 season
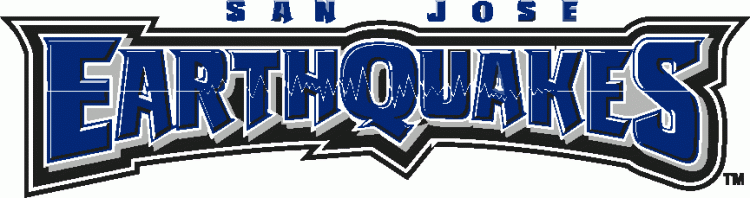
- Owner: AEG
- Coach: Dominic Kinnear
- Stadium: Spartan Stadium
- Major League Soccer: Conference: 1st Overall: 1st
- MLS Cup: Conference Semifinals
- U.S. Open Cup: Quarterfinals
- California Clásico: 1st
- Top goalscorer: Dwayne De Rosario (9)
- Average home league attendance: 15,431
Home colors	Away colors

The 2005 San Jose Earthquakes season was the tenth season of the team's existence, and last before suspending operations until the 2008 season. At the conclusion of the season, because of a dispute with the city of San Jose over the construction of a soccer specific stadium, the existing Earthquakes team was relocated to Houston, where they became known as the Houston Dynamo the next season. The relocated team was regarded as an "expansion team," with the Earthquakes being seen as having "suspended operations" after the season. The season marked the franchise's first Supporters' Shield.

== About ==
2004 was a disappointment after a strong finish to the 2003 season ending with a championship. Second year head coach Dominic Kinnear and assistant coach John Doyle hoped to return the Quakes back to the winning tradition in 2005. It was marked as the first year of the new generation for the Quakes after losing 9 key players in the off season from 2004-2005, and with the new roster expansion bringing in 18 players for the new season. The Earthquakes set a league record with an 18-4-10 record with 64 points on the year. They became the first MLS team to go undefeated at home during the regular season.

Change over from the 2004 team, key players lost in the off season, Ramiro Corrales and Landon Donovan left the squad in the off season to play abroad. Donovan would pull a swerve and return to MLS a short time later with rival Los Angeles Galaxy. A trade was set up to be in place with the Galaxy to obtain Carlos Ruiz but a deal was never reached. Ronnie Ekelund failed to resign, after both sides couldn't come to terms. Jamil Walker was picked up in the expansion draft by Chivas USA. Arturo Alvarez was traded to Dallas Burn for Brad Davis. Captain Jeff Agoos was traded to the Metrostars for Ricardo Clark and a draft pick. Chris Roner was lost due to injury and never returned, his rights were retained. Chris Brown was lost to Real Salt Lake in the expansion draft. Leighton o'brien player rights were traded to Real Salt Lake. Steve Cronin and Todd Dunivant were traded to the Galaxy for Aloisi and Claiff.

The first move Kinnear and Doyle made were bringing back veterans Wade Barrett and all time leader goal-scorer Ronald Cerritos were brought back into the team to add veteran leadership. They drafted key players Danny O'Rourke, Kevin Goldthwaite, future MLS Scoring Champion Chris Wondolowski, Robbie Fulton, Orlando Ramirez, Aaron Lanes, James Twellman and Brett Rodriguez. Wondolowski was the reserve league scoring champion during that season. Brad Davis, Ricardo Clark, Chris Aloisi, Kelly Gray, Mark Chung, Julian Nash, Alejandro Moreno, and Danny Califf were obtained through trades.

May 18, 2005 the Quakes would lose veteran and leader Troy Dayak to an injury that would force Dayak to announce his retirement at the end of the regular season. It made way for Danny Califf to step in and become one of the center back pairings in MLS history with Eddie Robinson. Veteran right back Craig Waibel was also lost to an injury in early June who was playing some of the best soccer of his career to a torn MCL and ACL. A trade was made with the Chicago Fire to bring in San Jose native Kelly Gray to challenge Chris Aloisi for the starting job. He eventually won and took it. Mark Chung was acquired when a rash of injures of happened when Ian Russell, Brad Davis, Brian Mullan spent time on the injury list in June and July.

Robinson, Califf both found January National Team call ups after a successful season, along with Brad Davis, Brian Mullan, Brian Ching, Wade Barrett, Kelly Gray and Ricardo Clark. Doyle lead the Reserve Team to a Championship its first year.

Chung announced his retirement from the Earthquake after coming to the mid-season via trade with the Colorado Rapids and contributing heavily to the ultimate success with the team. He opted out of moving with the team to Houston after the 2005 season.

Ian Russell, Mark Chung, Jon Conway, Troy Dayak didn't move with the team to Houston. Russell was traded to Los Angeles, Conway to New York, Chung and Dayak retired. Danny Califf opted to try his luck in Europe.

== Squad ==
=== Current squad ===
As of August 18, 2009. Note: Flags indicate national team as defined under FIFA eligibility rules; some limited exceptions apply. Players may hold more than one non-FIFA nationality.

No.	Pos.	Nation	Player
1	GK	USA	Jon Conway
2	DF	USA	Eddie Robinson
3	DF	USA	Kevin Goldthwaite
4	DF	USA	Danny Califf
5	MF	USA	Ryan Cochrane
6	MF	USA	Orlando Ramirez
7	MF	USA	Ian Russell
8	DF	USA	Brett Rodriguez
9	MF	USA	Brian Mullan
11	FW	USA	Brad Davis
12	MF	USA	Mark Chung
13	MF	USA	Ricardo Clark
14	MF	CAN	Dwayne De Rosario
15	FW	VEN	Alejandro Moreno
16	DF	USA	Craig Waibel

No.	Pos.	Nation	Player
17	DF	USA	Chris Aloisi
18	GK	CAN	Pat Onstad
19	DF	USA	Troy Dayak
20	FW	SLV	Ronald Cerritos
21	DF	USA	Tighe Dombrowski
23	MF	USA	Roger Levesque
24	DF	USA	Wade Barrett
25	FW	USA	Brian Ching
26	MF	USA	Kelly Gray
27	DF	USA	Danny O'Rourke
29	FW	USA	Chris Wondolowski
30	GK	USA	Robby Fulton
32	MF	USA	Aaron Lanes
33	FW	USA	Julian Nash
34	DF	USA	James Twellman

== Club ==
=== Management ===
Position	Staff
General Manager	(United States) Kate McAllister
Head Coach	(United States) Dominic Kinnear
Assistant Coach	(United States) John Doyle
Goalkeeper Coach	(New Zealand) Tim Hanely
Head trainer	(United States) Bruce Morgan
Equipment manager	(El Salvador) Jose Vega

Last updated: April 18, 2009
Source: San Jose Earthquakes

=== Other information ===
Owner	(United States) AEG
Ground (capacity and dimensions)	Spartan Stadium (26,525 / 71x110 yards)

Source: San Jose Earthquakes

== Competitions ==
=== Major League Soccer ===
==== Matches ====
April 2, 2005	San Jose Earthquakes	2–2	New England Revolution	San Jose, California
	Ching 13'; Cerritos 21'	Report	Noonan 52'; Twellman 73'	Stadium: Spartan Stadium; Attendance: 8,730

April 9, 2005	San Jose Earthquakes	3–3	Chivas USA	San Jose, California
	Davis 45'; Dayak 75'; Ching 79'	Report	Martins 3'; Cuadros 73'; Sequeira 90'	Stadium: Spartan Stadium; Attendance: 11,519

April 16, 2005	Chicago Fire	2–1	San Jose Earthquakes	Chicago
	own goal 58'; Thiago 91'	Report	Moreno 82'	Stadium: Soldier Field; Attendance: 12,907

April 23, 2005	San Jose Earthquakes	3–2	Kansas City Wizards	San Jose, California
	Cerritos 14'; Ching 40'; De Rosario 57'	Report	Sealy 5'; Klein 34'	Stadium: Spartan Stadium; Attendance: 8,028

April 30, 2005	Real Salt Lake	2–2	San Jose Earthquakes	Salt Lake City, Utah
	Kreis 21'; Kreis 34'	Report	Ching 11'; Moreno 82'	Stadium: Rice-Eccles Stadium; Attendance: 16,254

May 7, 2005	MetroStars	0–1	San Jose Earthquakes	East Rutherford, New Jersey
		Report	Cerritos 60'	Stadium: Giants Stadium; Attendance: 8,274

May 14, 2005	San Jose Earthquakes	0–0	FC Dallas	San Jose, California
		Report		Stadium: Spartan Stadium; Attendance: 11,067

May 21, 2005	Los Angeles Galaxy	2–1	San Jose Earthquakes	Carson, California
	Kirovski 39'; Vagenas 77'	Report	Cerritos 69'	Stadium: Home Depot Center; Attendance: 22,207

May 25, 2005	Colorado Rapids	0–1	San Jose Earthquakes	Denver
		Report	Moreno 76'	Stadium: Invesco Field; Attendance: 6,579

May 28, 2005	Kansas City Wizards	1–0	San Jose Earthquakes	Kansas City, Missouri
	Jewsbury 59'	Report		Stadium: Arrowhead Stadium; Attendance: 8,526

June 4, 2005	San Jose Earthquakes	0–0	D.C. United	San Jose, California
		Report		Stadium: Spartan Stadium; Attendance: 11,989

June 12, 2005	Chivas USA	1–1	San Jose Earthquakes	Carson, California
	Hendrickson 66'	Report	Moreno 45'	Stadium: Home Depot Center; Attendance: 8,654

June 18, 2005	San Jose Earthquakes	3–0	Real Salt Lake	San Jose, California
	Chung 2'; Gray 13'; Barrett 35'	Report		Stadium: Spartan Stadium; Attendance: 9,630

June 25, 2005	San Jose Earthquakes	3–0	Los Angeles Galaxy	San Jose, California
	Moreno 37' own goal 65' own goal 68'	Report		Stadium: Spartan Stadium; Attendance: 15,917

June 29, 2005	San Jose Earthquakes	1–0	Colorado Rapids	San Jose, California
	De Rosario 88'	Report		Stadium: Spartan Stadium; Attendance: 9,811

July 2, 2005	FC Dallas	2–2	San Jose Earthquakes	Dallas, Texas
	Alvarez 4'; Gbandi 57'	Report	Mullan 6'; Clark 59'	Stadium: Cotton Bowl; Attendance: 8,719

July 9, 2005	Columbus Crew	1–2	San Jose Earthquakes	Columbus, Ohio
	Marshall 18'	Report	Robinson 30'; Cerritos 63'	Stadium: Columbus Crew Stadium; Attendance: 12,539

July 15, 2005	D.C. United	3–0	San Jose Earthquakes	Washington, D.C.
	Gómez 25'; Moreno 50'; Gómez 70'	Report		Stadium: RFK Stadium; Attendance: 13,978

July 20, 2005	Colorado Rapids	1–2	San Jose Earthquakes	Denver
	Harris 81'	Report	Mullan 20'; Chung 73'	Stadium: Invesco Field; Attendance: 6,974

July 23, 2005	San Jose Earthquakes	2–1	MetroStars	San Jose, California
	Chung 33'; De Rosario 53'	Report	own goal 32'	Stadium: Spartan Stadium; Attendance: 10,302

August 6, 2005	San Jose Earthquakes	2–1	Columbus Crew	San Jose, California
	De Rosario 13'; Davis 54'	Report	Henderson 78'	Stadium: Spartan Stadium; Attendance: 9,465

August 13, 2005	San Jose Earthquakes	1–1	Colorado Rapids	San Jose, California
	Clark 48'	Report	Peguero 57'	Stadium: Spartan Stadium; Attendance: 9,103

August 20, 2005	Real Salt Lake	0–1	San Jose Earthquakes	Salt Lake City, Utah
		Report	Chung 41'	Stadium: Rice-Eccles Stadium; Attendance: 15,127

August 27, 2005	San Jose Earthquakes	2–1	Los Angeles Galaxy	San Jose, California
	Moreno 23'; Califf 75'	Report	Donovan 37'	Stadium: Spartan Stadium; Attendance: 24,112

September 3, 2005	FC Dallas	0–2	San Jose Earthquakes	Dallas, Texas
		Report	Cerritos 50'; Moreno 53'	Stadium: Cotton Bowl; Attendance: 8,023

September 10, 2005	San Jose Earthquakes	3–0	Chivas USA	San Jose, California
	Chung 47'; Clark 74'; Ching 87'	Report		Stadium: Spartan Stadium; Attendance: 22,311

September 17, 2005	Chivas USA	1–2	San Jose Earthquakes	Carson, California
	Ramírez 52'	Report	Califf 82'; Moreno 93'	Stadium: Home Depot Center; Attendance: 10,342

September 21, 2005	San Jose Earthquakes	2–0	Chicago Fire	San Jose, California
	De Rosario 14'; De Rosario 50'	Report		Stadium: Spartan Stadium; Attendance: 9,789

September 24, 2005	San Jose Earthquakes	1–1	FC Dallas	San Jose, California
	Ching 68'	Report	Núñez 58'	Stadium: Spartan Stadium; Attendance: 17,414

October 1, 2005	New England Revolution	0–2	San Jose Earthquakes	Foxborough, Massachusetts
		Report	Ching 60'; De Rosario 80'	Stadium: Gillette Stadium; Attendance: 14,316

October 8, 2005	San Jose Earthquakes	2–2	Real Salt Lake	San Jose, California
	De Rosario 38'; Nash 44'	Report	Novak 64'; Williams 73'	Stadium: Spartan Stadium; Attendance: 19,407

October 15, 2005	Los Angeles Galaxy	1–3	San Jose Earthquakes	Carson, California
	Donovan 68'	Report	Chung 42'; De Rosario 45'; Mullan 77'	Stadium: Home Depot Center; Attendance: 27,000

=== MLS Cup Playoffs ===
October 23, 2005 Conference Semifinal	Los Angeles Galaxy	3–1	San Jose Earthquakes	Carson, California
	Gómez 13'; Donovan 39'; Donovan 87'	Report	Clark 68'	Stadium: Home Depot Center; Attendance: 17,466

October 29, 2005 Conference Semifinal	San Jose Earthquakes	1–1 (2–4 agg.)	Los Angeles Galaxy	San Jose, California
	Ching 42'	Report	Grabavoy 1'	Stadium: Spartan Stadium; Attendance: 17,824

=== U.S. Open Cup ===
August 3, 2005 Fourth round	Portland Timbers (Oregon)	0–2	(California) San Jose Earthquakes	Portland, Oregon
		Report	Barrett 27'; Mullan 83'	Stadium: PGE Park; Attendance: 6,607

August 24, 2005 Quarterfinal	San Jose Earthquakes (California)	1–2	(California) LA Galaxy	San Jose, California
	Cerritos 76'	Report	Gómez 5'; Gómez 31'	Stadium: Spartan Stadium; Attendance: 5,134

==== Standings ====
Pos	Team	Pld	W	L	T	GF	GA	GD	Pts	Qualification
1	San Jose Earthquakes	32	18	4	10	53	31	+22	64	MLS Cup Playoffs
2	FC Dallas	32	13	10	9	52	44	+8	48	MLS Cup Playoffs
3	Colorado Rapids	32	13	13	6	40	37	+3	45	MLS Cup Playoffs
4	Los Angeles Galaxy	32	13	13	6	44	45	−1	45	MLS Cup Playoffs
5	Real Salt Lake	32	5	22	5	30	65	−35	20	
6	Chivas USA	32	4	22	6	31	67	−36	18	

Source: MLS

Pos	Team	Pld	W	L	T	GF	GA	GD	Pts	Qualification
1	San Jose Earthquakes (S)	32	18	4	10	53	31	+22	64	
2	New England Revolution	32	17	7	8	55	37	+18	59	CONCACAF Champions' Cup
3	D.C. United	32	16	10	6	58	37	+21	54	
4	Chicago Fire	32	15	13	4	49	50	−1	49	
5	Dallas Burn	32	13	10	9	52	44	+8	48	
6	MetroStars	32	12	9	11	53	49	+4	47	
7	Colorado Rapids	32	13	13	6	40	37	+3	45	
8	Los Angeles Galaxy (C)	32	13	13	6	44	45	−1	45	CONCACAF Champions' Cup
9	Kansas City Wizards	32	11	9	12	52	44	+8	45	
10	Columbus Crew	32	11	16	5	34	45	−11	38	
11	Real Salt Lake	32	5	22	5	30	65	−35	20	
12	Chivas USA	32	4	22	6	31	67	−36	18	

Source: MLS
Rules for classification: 1) points; 2) head-to-head record; 3) goal difference; 4) number of goals scored
(C) Champions; (S) Supporters' Shield
