= MLS Cup 2003 =

2003 edition of the MLS Cup

- Event: MLS Cup
Chicago Fire	San Jose Earthquakes
2	4
- Date: November 23, 2003
- Venue: Home Depot Center, Carson, California, US
- MLS Cup MVP: Landon Donovan (San Jose Earthquakes)
- Referee: Brian Hall
- Attendance: 27,000
- Weather: Sunny, 71 °F (22 °C)

MLS Cup 2003 was the eighth edition of the MLS Cup, the championship match of Major League Soccer (MLS), which took place on November 23, 2003. It was hosted at the Home Depot Center in Carson, California, and was contested by the Chicago Fire and the San Jose Earthquakes to decide the champion of the 2003 season. Both teams had previously won the MLS Cup and were looking for their second championship.

San Jose defeated Chicago 4–2, clinching their second championship in three years; Landon Donovan scored two goals and was named the match's most valuable player. The match included a sequence of three goals scored within a five-minute period early in the second half and had the earliest goal scored in MLS Cup history, the competition's first own goal, and the first penalty kick awarded in a final. It was also the highest-scoring final, with six goals in total.

== Venue ==
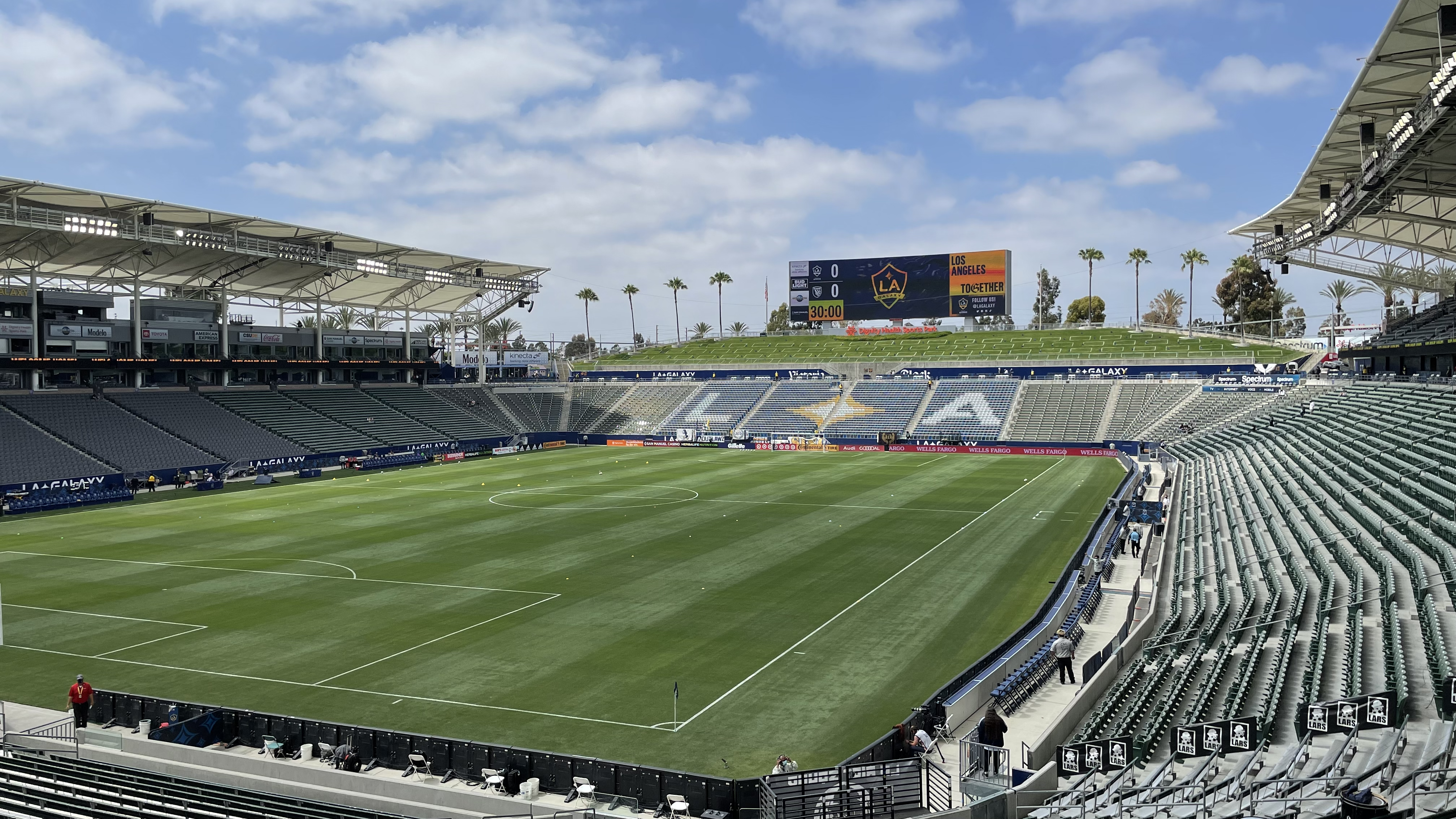
The Home Depot Center, host of MLS Cup 2003 and home of the Los Angeles Galaxy

The under construction Home Depot Center was announced as the venue of MLS Cup 2003 on February 27, 2002, a week after CMGI Field in Foxborough, Massachusetts, was awarded the 2002 final. The 27,000-seat stadium opened on June 7, 2003, as the centerpiece of a $140 million multi-sport complex in the Los Angeles suburb of Carson. The Home Depot Center is a soccer-specific stadium that was built to primarily serve as the home of the Los Angeles Galaxy. It also hosted several matches during the 2003 FIFA Women's World Cup in September and October, including the final match.

The 2003 edition was the second MLS Cup to be hosted in the Los Angeles area, following the 1998 cup at the Rose Bowl in Pasadena, California, attended by 51,530 spectators. The 2003 cup was attended by a sellout crowd of 27,000, including 500 San Jose Earthquakes supporters in the designated away section. The Home Depot Center was selected to host later MLS Cups in 2004, 2008, and 2011 before neutral venues for the final were abolished. The stadium, later renamed the StubHub Center, would go on to host the MLS Cup in 2012 and 2014.

== Road to the final ==
The MLS Cup is the post-season championship of Major League Soccer (MLS), a professional club soccer league based in the United States. The 2003 season was the eighth in the league's history and was contested by ten teams in two conferences. Each team played a total of 30 matches in the regular season from April to October, facing teams within their conference four times, outside of their conference two times, and playing an additional set of games against a non-conference team. The playoffs ran entirely within November and was contested by the top four teams in each conference, a change from the 2002 playoffs. It was organized into three rounds: a home-and-away series in the Conference Semifinals with a winner determined by aggregate score, followed by an overtime period and a penalty shootout if necessary; a single-match Conference Final; and the MLS Cup final.

MLS Cup 2003 was contested by the Chicago Fire, who also won the regular season's Supporters' Shield and the U.S. Open Cup, and the San Jose Earthquakes. Both teams had previously won the MLS Cup and finished at the top of their respective conferences in regular season play, separated by a single point. The two teams had not previously met in the playoffs. Chicago and San Jose played three matches in the regular season, which ended in two scoreless draws and a 4–1 victory in May for the Fire at San Jose's Spartan Stadium.

=== Chicago Fire ===
The Chicago Fire entered as one of the league's first two expansion teams in 1998, winning the MLS Cup and U.S. Open Cup in their inaugural season. The team returned to the MLS Cup in 2000, losing to the Kansas City Wizards, and won the 2000 U.S. Open Cup. The team finished the 2002 season as the third-placed seed in the Eastern Conference, its worst-ever performance, and were eliminated by the New England Revolution in the Conference Semifinals. The Fire had moved to Cardinal Stadium, a college venue in Naperville, Illinois, for the 2002 and 2003 seasons while Soldier Field was renovated.

Dave Sarachan was hired to replace Bob Bradley as head coach and drafted several rookie players, including forwards Nate Jaqua and Damani Ralph, and new acquisitions to bolster the team's existing lineup while offloading expensive veteran players. The Fire struggled with injuries to several starting players that led to several draws and losses early in the season, but scored key victories and won a Supporters' Shield title and the 2003 U.S. Open Cup. Sarachan was named MLS Coach of the Year prior to the MLS Cup final, where a win would clinch a treble for the first time in American soccer history.

Chicago entered the playoffs as top seed and faced D.C. United in the Conference Semifinals. The team won 4–0 on aggregate with back-to-back 2–0 wins and advanced to face New England in the Conference Finals. The match, played at Soldier Field in Chicago, was scoreless after regulation time and advanced to overtime, where captain Chris Armas scored the golden goal in the 101st minute. The Fire became the first team to reach an MLS Cup final without conceding a goal in the playoffs, earning three straight shutouts.

=== San Jose Earthquakes ===
The San Jose Earthquakes (originally the San Jose Clash) participated in the inaugural edition of the playoffs in 1996, but failed to qualify for four subsequent seasons. After finishing the 2000 season in last place, Frank Yallop was hired as the club's fifth head coach in 2001, taking the retiring Dominic Kinnear as his assistant. The team was bolstered by the acquisition of veteran defender Jeff Agoos, striker Dwayne De Rosario, and teenage forward Landon Donovan. The Earthquakes went on a 12-match unbeaten streak and won their first MLS Cup over the Los Angeles Galaxy, their in-state rivals. San Jose finished the 2002 season in second place, behind the Galaxy, but were eliminated by the Columbus Crew in the Conference Semifinals.

The Earthquakes acquired several rookie players in the 2003 SuperDraft, including midfielder Todd Dunivant, forward Jamil Walker, and goalkeeper Josh Saunders, capping a busy off-season that saw the departure of several veteran players. San Jose began the season with a six-match unbeaten streak and continued to stay atop the Western Conference standings despite injuries to several key players and absences due to national team call-ups. The team held on to finish second overall behind the Chicago Fire with 51 points, with Landon Donovan leading the team's scoring with 12 goals and Pat Onstad setting new goalkeeping records for the club.

San Jose were paired with rivals Los Angeles in the Conference Semifinals and lost the away leg 2–0, conceding goals to Sasha Victorine and Carlos Ruiz after a half-time skirmish. The Galaxy's extended their aggregate lead to 4–0 during the first 13 minutes of the second leg at Spartan Stadium on November 9, but the Earthquakes responded by scoring four unanswered goals to tie the match 4–4 on aggregate, including a last-minute header from defender Chris Roner. San Jose clinched their series victory with a golden goal scored by substitute forward Rodrigo Faria in the 96th minute, capping a comeback in what was called one of the greatest matches in MLS history. In the Conference Final against the Kansas City Wizards on November 15, San Jose conceded the first goal and rallied to equalize before trailing 2–1. Earthquakes midfielder Brian Mullan then equalized again and sent the match to overtime, where Landon Donovan scored a golden goal in the 117th minute.

=== Summary of results ===
Note: In all results below, the score of the finalist is given first (H: home; A: away).

Chicago Fire				Round	San Jose Earthquakes			
1st place in Eastern Conference: Pos. / Club / Pld. / W / L / D / Pts.; 1 / Chicago Fire (SS) / 30 / 15 / 7 / 8 / 53; 2 / New England Revolution / 30 / 12 / 9 / 9 / 45; 3 / MetroStars / 30 / 11 / 10 / 9 / 42; 4 / D.C. United / 30 / 10 / 11 / 9 / 39; 5 / Columbus Crew / 30 / 10 / 12 / 8 / 38; Source: MLS Qualified for playoffs Supporters' Shield winner				Regular season	1st place in Western Conference: Pos. / Club / Pld. / W / L / D / Pts.; 1 / San Jose Earthquakes / 30 / 14 / 7 / 9 / 51; 2 / Kansas City Wizards / 30 / 11 / 10 / 9 / 42; 3 / Colorado Rapids / 30 / 11 / 12 / 7 / 40; 4 / Los Angeles Galaxy / 30 / 9 / 12 / 9 / 36; 5 / Dallas Burn / 30 / 6 / 19 / 5 / 23; Source: MLS Qualified for playoffs			
Opponent	Agg.	1st leg	2nd leg	MLS Cup Playoffs	Opponent	Agg.	1st leg	2nd leg
D.C. United	4–0	2–0 (A)	2–0 (H)	Conference Semifinals	Los Angeles Galaxy	5–4	0–2 (A)	5–2 (a.e.t.) (H)
New England Revolution	1–0 (H)			Conference Final	Kansas City Wizards	3–2 (H)		

== Broadcasting and entertainment ==
The MLS Cup final was televised in the United States on ABC in English and Spanish using secondary audio programming. English play-by-play commentary was provided by JP Dellacamera with color analysis by Ty Keough, reprising their roles at MLS Cup 2002. Play-by-play commentator Ernesto Motta returned from the previous cup's Spanish-language broadcast, working alongside color analyst Robert Sierra. ABC/ESPN provided a total of 20 cameras, including aerial coverage from a Goodyear Blimp. The match was also broadcast live on radio within the U.S. on Sports Byline USA in English and Radio Unica in Spanish, and on the American Forces Radio Network internationally. The ABC broadcast earned a Nielsen rating of 0.6, the lowest figure recorded for an MLS Cup.

The match's half-time show featured singer Michelle Branch, who performed her hit single "Breathe".

== Match ==
=== Summary ===
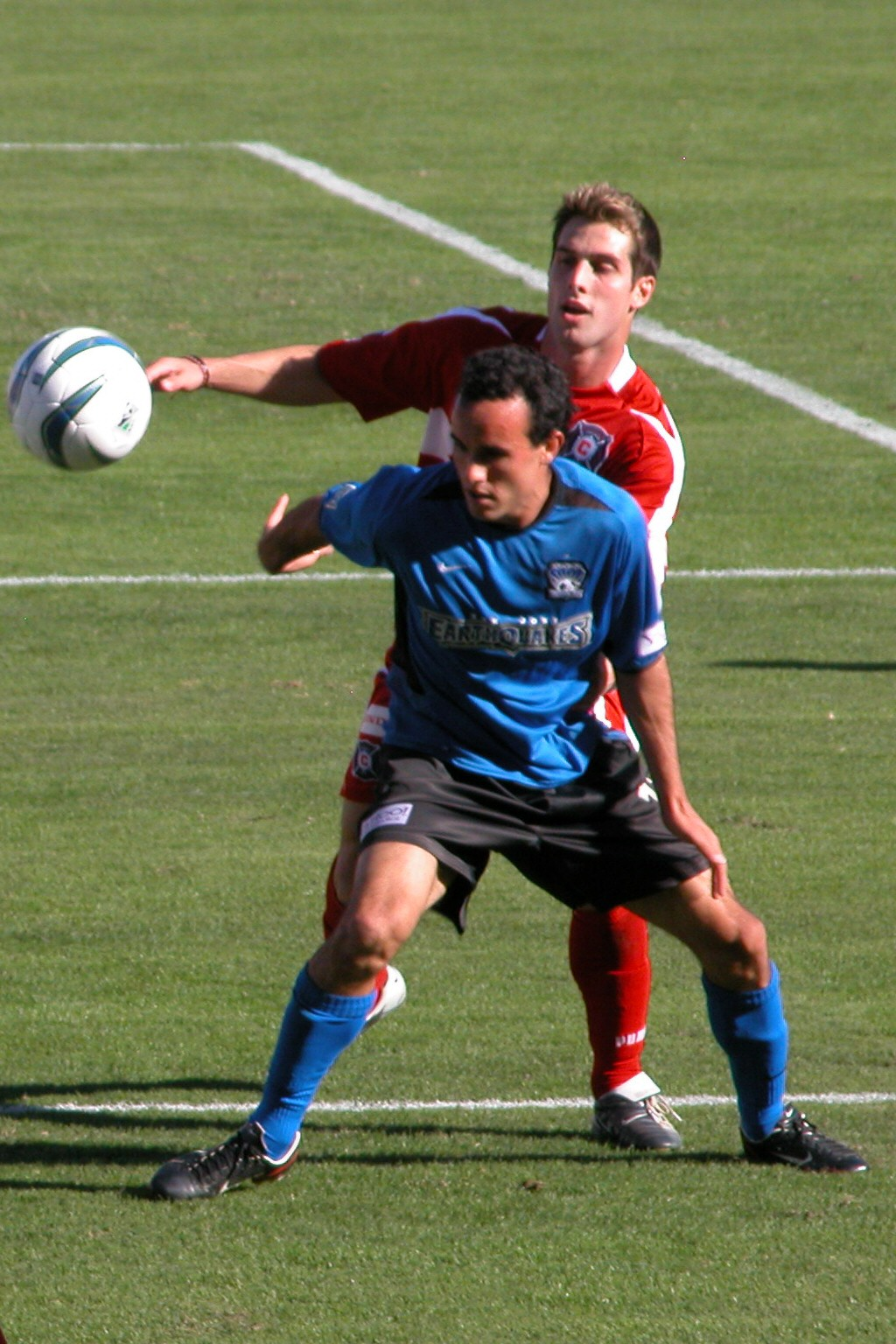
San Jose forward Landon Donovan scored two goals and was named match MVP at MLS Cup 2003

Referee of the Year Brian Hall was chosen to officiate the match and was previously the head referee at MLS Cup 1997. At kickoff, set for 12:30 p.m. Pacific Time, the weather in Carson was sunny with a temperature of 71 °F (22 °C). Both teams fielded their regular lineups arranged in a 4–4–2 formation.

The Earthquakes kicked off the match and made a series of attacks that won them a free kick outside of the penalty box. After a faked shot by Jeff Agoos, Danish midfielder Ronnie Ekelund drove the ball past the defensive wall and scored the first goal of the final, tying the record for fastest MLS Cup goal. Chicago had the majority of possession and chances in the first half, including two shots that were missed by striker Ante Razov and a poor touch by Damani Ralph, but eventually conceded a second goal to San Jose. An Earthquakes counter-attack in the 38th minute sprung Jamil Walker, who sent a through-pass to Landon Donovan, who sprinted pass several defenders and shot the ball past goalkeeper Zach Thornton.

The second half opened with a sequence of three goals by both teams within five minutes, beginning with a short pass by Andy Williams to DaMarcus Beasley that was shot into the near side of the goal, cutting San Jose's lead to 2–1. Shortly after kickoff, a long overhead pass by Brian Mullan found Earthquakes midfielder Richard Mulrooney, who scored and restored the Earthquakes' two-goal lead. The Fire continued to press for a second goal and earned a throw-in near San Jose's goal that led to a cross into the box by Evan Whitfield. The cross was deflected into the goal by Earthquakes defender Chris Roner, who had been substituted three minutes earlier, narrowing the team's lead to 3–2 in the 54th minute. Roner then conceded a penalty kick to the Earthquakes two minutes later after a tackle from behind on Damani Ralph in the penalty area. Ante Razov took the penalty kick, the first in MLS Cup history, but it was saved by goalkeeper Pat Onstad with a dive to his right side to catch the ball.

Razov attempted to score an equalizing goal in the 58th minute, taking a shot in front of Onstad that grazed the corner of the net. San Jose forward Jamil Walker suffered an injury and was replaced in the 60th minute by Dwayne DeRosario, who sized on a mis-cleared ball from Chicago ten minutes later and sent a cross into the box that was finished by Landon Donovan, giving the Earthquakes a 4–2 lead in the 71st minute. With the goal, Donovan became the first player to score two goals in an MLS Cup. A chance for Chicago to reduce San Jose's lead came from a cross by Ralph in the 82nd minute that rolled across the six-yard box, but the tap-in for Razov was missed and the ball continued out of bounds. Ralph also had a chance to score a consolation goal in the third minute of stoppage time, a cross by Nate Jaqua that he headed wide in front of the goal. Despite having fewer shots and corner kicks, the San Jose Earthquakes won the match 4–2 and earned their second championship in three years.

=== Details ===
November 23, 2003
12:30 PST

Chicago Fire	2–4	San Jose Earthquakes
Beasley 49'; Roner 54' (o.g.)	Report (Archived)	Ekelund 5'; Donovan 38', 71'; Mulrooney 50'

Home Depot Center, Carson, California
Attendance: 27,000
Referee: Brian Hall

Chicago Fire
San Jose Earthquakes

GK	18	(United States) Zach Thornton
DF	3	(United States) Evan Whitfield
DF	5	(United States) Jim Curtin	(substituted off) 81'
DF	4	(United States) Carlos Bocanegra
DF	20	(United States) Orlando Perez	(substituted off) 45'
MF	16	(Jamaica) Andy Williams	(substituted off) 70'
MF	15	(United States) Jesse Marsch
MF	14	(United States) Chris Armas (c)
MF	7	(United States) DaMarcus Beasley
FW	8	(Jamaica) Damani Ralph
FW	9	(United States) Ante Razov
Substitutes:
GK	1	(United States) Curtis Spiteri
DF	2	(United States) C. J. Brown
DF	6	(United States) Kelly Gray	(substituted on) 45'
DF	12	(United States) Logan Pause
MF	21	(United States) Justin Mapp	(substituted on) 70'
MF	22	(Costa Rica) Jonathan Bolaños
MF	24	(United States) Ryan Futagaki
FW	11	(United States) Nate Jaqua	(substituted on) 81'
FW	17	(Botswana) Dipsy Selolwane
Manager:
(United States) Dave Sarachan

GK	18	(Canada) Pat Onstad
DF	16	(United States) Craig Waibel	(yellow card) 15'	(substituted off) 51'
DF	19	(United States) Troy Dayak
DF	2	(United States) Eddie Robinson	(yellow card) 54'
DF	12	(United States) Jeff Agoos (c)
MF	9	(United States) Brian Mullan
MF	8	(United States) Richard Mulrooney
MF	6	(Denmark) Ronnie Ekelund
MF	11	(United States) Manny Lagos		(substituted off) 70'
FW	10	(United States) Landon Donovan
FW	13	(United States) Jamil Walker		(substituted off) 60'
Substitutes:
GK	1	(United States) Jon Conway
GK	30	(United States) Josh Saunders
DF	5	(United States) Ramiro Corrales
DF	17	(United States) Todd Dunivant
MF	7	(United States) Ian Russell		(substituted on) 70'
MF	4	(United States) Chris Roner		(substituted on) 51'
FW	14	(Canada) Dwayne De Rosario		(substituted on) 60'
FW	15	(United States) Roger Levesque
FW	22	(Brazil) Rodrigo Faria
Manager:
(Canada) Frank Yallop

MLS Cup Most Valuable Player:
(United States) Landon Donovan (San Jose Earthquakes)

Assistant referees:
(United States) Craig Lowry
(United States) Darren Engers
Fourth official:
(United States) Noel Kenny

Match rules

- 90 minutes of regulation time
- Two 15-minute periods of extra time with golden goals to decide a winner.
- Penalty shootout if scores still tied.

=== Statistics ===
Statistics
	Chicago Fire	San Jose Earthquakes
Goals scored	2	4
Total shots	22	11
Shots on target	10	7
Saves	4	8
Corner kicks	13	3
Fouls committed	17	14
Offsides	4	3
Yellow cards	0	2
Red cards	0	0

== Post-match ==
The San Jose Earthquakes became the second team in league history to win multiple MLS Cups, following D.C. United's three titles in the 1990s. The six-goal 2003 final was the highest-scoring in MLS Cup history, beating the five-goal inaugural edition, and featured its earliest goal, its first own goal, and its first awarded penalty kick. The own goal and penalty kick were both caused by Earthquakes defender Chris Roner, who would undergo ankle surgery at the end of the season that ultimately led to the end of his playing career. Landon Donovan became the first player to score multiple goals in an MLS Cup final and was named the match's most valuable player. San Jose captain Jeff Agoos won his fifth MLS Cup, having played in six previous finals for the Earthquakes and D.C. United.

San Jose qualified for the 2004 CONCACAF Champions' Cup as MLS Cup champions, while Chicago also qualified as Supporters' Shield champion. The Earthquakes were eliminated in the quarterfinals by eventual champions Alajuelense, while the Fire were defeated by Deportivo Saprissa in the semifinals. Both teams have yet to make an appearance at the MLS Cup final since 2003; two years after the cup, the Earthquakes were placed on hiatus and replaced by the Houston Dynamo, who would win back-to-back MLS Cups in their first two seasons before San Jose was reinstated in 2008. The first domestic treble in MLS history was ultimately won in 2017 by Toronto FC.
