= 2003 Major League Soccer season =

8th season of Major League Soccer

- Season: 2003
- Teams: 10
- MLS Cup: San Jose Earthquakes (2nd title)
- Supporters' Shield: Chicago Fire (1st shield)
- 2004 CONCACAF Champions' Cup: San Jose Earthquakes; Chicago Fire
- Matches: 150
- Goals: 433 (2.89 per match)
- Top goalscorer: Carlos Ruiz; Los Angeles Galaxy; Goals: 15; Taylor Twellman; N.E. Revolution; Goals: 15
- Biggest home win: CHI 4–0 COL; CLB 6–2 CHI
- Biggest away win: SJ 1–4 CHI; DAL 0–3 SJ
- Highest scoring: NY 4–4 SJ; CLB 6–2 CHI
- Longest winning run: Colorado Rapids; Games: 5 (07/04 – 08/09); MetroStars; Games: 5 (04/26 – 05/24)
- Longest unbeaten run: Chicago Fire; Games: 7 (07/19 – 08/24); Colorado Rapids; Games: 7 (08/16 – 10/01)
- Longest losing run: Colorado Rapids; Games: 4 (05/03 – 05/25); Dallas Burn; Games: 4 (07/19 -08/13)
- Highest attendance: Los Angeles Galaxy; Season: 329,752; Game Avg.: 21,983
- Lowest attendance: Dallas Burn; Season: 118,585; Game Avg.: 7,906
- Total attendance: 2,234,747
- Average attendance: 14,898

Locations of teams for the 2003 Major League Soccer season
Western Conference Eastern Conference

The 2003 Major League Soccer season was the eighth season of Major League Soccer. It was also the 91st season of FIFA-sanctioned soccer in the United States, and the 25th with a national first-division league.

The Los Angeles Galaxy moved into the league's second soccer-specific stadium when the Home Depot Center opened on June 1, 2003. The Chicago Fire continued to play at Cardinal Stadium in Naperville but returned to the newly renovated Soldier Field for their final regular season game.

The number of games was increased to 30 after a reduction to 28 for the 2002 season. Instead of a best-of-three series, the playoffs were tweaked so that the conference semifinals would be determined by a home-and-away aggregate score over two matches, with the higher-seeded team hosting the second leg. Additionally, the two conference finals became single-leg hosted by the higher seed.

The regular season began on April 5, and concluded on October 26. The 2003 MLS Cup Playoffs began on November 1, and concluded with MLS Cup 2003 on November 23. The San Jose Earthquakes won their second MLS Cup in three years with a victory over Chicago.

== Overview ==
=== Season format ===
The season began on April 5 and concluded with MLS Cup on November 23. The 10 teams were split evenly into two conferences. Each team played 30 games that were evenly divided between home and away. Each team played every other team in their conference, and two designated opponents from the opposite conference, four times, and the remaining teams in the opposite conference twice.

The top four teams from each conference qualified for the MLS Cup Playoffs. In the first round, aggregate goals over two matches determined the winners. The conference finals were played as a single match, and the winners advanced to MLS Cup. In all rounds, draws were broken with two 15-minute periods of extra time, followed by penalty kicks if necessary. The away goals rule was not used in any round.

The team with the most points in the regular season was awarded the MLS Supporters' Shield. Additionally, the winner of MLS Cup and the runner-up qualified for the CONCACAF Champions' Cup.

=== Stadiums and locations ===
Team	Stadium	Capacity
Chicago Fire	Cardinal Stadium; Soldier Field	15,000; 61,500
Colorado Rapids	Invesco Field at Mile High	76,125
Columbus Crew	Columbus Crew Stadium	22,555
D.C. United	RFK Stadium	46,000
Dallas Burn	Dragon Stadium	11,000
Kansas City Wizards	Arrowhead Stadium	81,425
Los Angeles Galaxy	Home Depot Center	27,000
MetroStars	Giants Stadium	80,200
New England Revolution	Gillette Stadium	68,756
San Jose Earthquakes	Spartan Stadium	30,456

=== Personnel and sponsorships ===
Team	Head coach	Captain	Shirt sponsor
Chicago Fire	(United States) Dave Sarachan		—
Colorado Rapids	(United States) Tim Hankinson		
Columbus Crew	(United States) Greg Andrulis		Pepsi
D.C. United	(England) Ray Hudson		—
Dallas Burn	(Northern Ireland) Colin Clarke		
Kansas City Wizards	(United States) Bob Gansler		—
Los Angeles Galaxy	(United States) Sigi Schmid		Budweiser
MetroStars	(United States) Bob Bradley	(United States) Eddie Pope	—
New England Revolution	(Scotland) Steve Nicol		—
San Jose Earthquakes	(Canada) Frank Yallop	(United States) Jeff Agoos	Yahoo! en Español

=== Coaching changes ===
Team	Outgoing coach	Manner of departure	Date of vacancy	Incoming coach	Date of appointment
Dallas Burn	(United States) Mike Jeffries	Fired	September 15, 2003	(Northern Ireland) Colin Clarke	September 15, 2003

== Standings ==
=== Eastern Conference ===
Pos	Team	Pld	W	L	T	GF	GA	GD	Pts	Qualification
1	Chicago Fire	30	15	7	8	53	43	+10	53	MLS Cup Playoffs
2	New England Revolution	30	12	9	9	55	47	+8	45	MLS Cup Playoffs
3	MetroStars	30	11	10	9	40	40	0	42	MLS Cup Playoffs
4	D.C. United	30	10	11	9	38	36	+2	39	MLS Cup Playoffs
5	Columbus Crew	30	10	12	8	44	44	0	38	

Source: MLS

=== Western Conference ===
Pos	Team	Pld	W	L	T	GF	GA	GD	Pts	Qualification
1	San Jose Earthquakes	30	14	7	9	45	35	+10	51	MLS Cup Playoffs
2	Kansas City Wizards	30	11	10	9	48	44	+4	42	MLS Cup Playoffs
3	Colorado Rapids	30	11	12	7	40	45	−5	40	MLS Cup Playoffs
4	Los Angeles Galaxy	30	9	12	9	35	35	0	36	MLS Cup Playoffs
5	Dallas Burn	30	6	19	5	35	64	−29	23	

Source: MLS

=== Overall standings ===
Pos	Team	Pld	W	L	T	GF	GA	GD	Pts	Qualification
1	Chicago Fire (S)	30	15	7	8	53	43	+10	53	CONCACAF Champions' Cup
2	San Jose Earthquakes (C)	30	14	7	9	45	35	+10	51	CONCACAF Champions' Cup
3	New England Revolution	30	12	9	9	55	47	+8	45	
4	Kansas City Wizards	30	11	10	9	48	44	+4	42	
5	MetroStars	30	11	10	9	40	40	0	42	
6	Colorado Rapids	30	11	12	7	40	45	−5	40	
7	D.C. United	30	10	11	9	38	36	+2	39	
8	Columbus Crew	30	10	12	8	44	44	0	38	
9	Los Angeles Galaxy	30	9	12	9	35	35	0	36	
10	Dallas Burn	30	6	19	5	35	64	−29	23	

Source: MLS
Rules for classification: 1) points; 2) head-to-head record; 3) goal difference; 4) number of goals scored
(C) Champions; (S) Supporters' Shield

== MLS Cup Playoffs ==
=== Bracket ===
Conference semifinals
E1	Chicago (wins 4–0 agg.)	2	2
E4	D.C. United	0	0
Eastern Conference
E2	New England (wins 3–1 agg.)	2	1
E3	MetroStars	0	1
W1	San Jose (wins 5–4 agg.)	0	5*
W4	Los Angeles	2	2
Western Conference
W3	Kansas City (wins 3–1 agg.)	1	2
W2	Colorado	1	0

Conference finals
E1	Chicago	1
E3	New England	0
W1	San Jose	3
W3	Kansas City	2

MLS Cup
E1	Chicago	2
W1	San Jose	4

=== Eastern Conference semifinals ===
November 1, 2003

Chicago Fire	2–0	D.C. United
Williams 4'; Razov 94'

RFK Stadium
Washington, D.C.
Attendance: 15,202
November 9, 2003

D.C. United	0–2	Chicago Fire
		Ralph 17'; Razov 55'

Soldier Field
Chicago, Illinois
Attendance: 15,312

Chicago Fire won 4–0 on aggregate.

November 1, 2003

New England Revolution	2–0	MetroStars
Fabbro 17'; Noonan 65'

Giants Stadium
East Rutherford, New Jersey
Attendance: 10,211
November 9, 2003

MetroStars	1–1	New England Revolution
Guevara 45' (pen.)		Noonan 21'

Gillette Stadium
Foxborough, Massachusetts
Attendance: 14,823

New England Revolution won 3–1 on aggregate.

=== Western Conference semifinals ===
November 1, 2003

San Jose Earthquakes	0–2	Los Angeles Galaxy
		Victorine 59'; Ruiz 62'

Home Depot Center
Carson, California
Attendance: 20,201
November 9, 2003

Los Angeles Galaxy	2–5 (a.e.t.)	San Jose Earthquakes
Ruiz 7'; Vagenas 13'		Agoos 21'; Donovan 35'; Walker 50'; Roner 90'; Faria 96'

Spartan Stadium
San Jose, California
Attendance: 14,145

San Jose Earthquakes won 5–4 on aggregate after golden goal extra time.

November 4, 2003

Kansas City Wizards	1–1	Colorado Rapids
Harris 3'		Borchers 53'

INVESCO Field at Mile High
Denver, Colorado
Attendance: 6,434
November 8, 2003

Colorado Rapids	0–2	Kansas City Wizards
		Simutenkov 45'; Klein 63'

Arrowhead Stadium
Kansas City, Missouri
Attendance: 10,712

Kansas City Wizards won 3–1 on aggregate.

=== Conference finals ===
Eastern Conference

November 14, 2003

New England Revolution	0–1 (a.e.t.)	Chicago Fire
		Armas 101'

Soldier Field
Chicago, Illinois
Attendance: 14,610

Western Conference

November 15, 2003

Kansas City Wizards	2–3 (a.e.t.)	San Jose Earthquakes
Simutenkov 57'; Klein 72'		Lagos 61'; Mullan 83'; Donovan 117'

Spartan Stadium
San Jose, California
Attendance: 16,108

=== MLS Cup ===
November 23, 2003

Chicago Fire	2–4	San Jose Earthquakes
Beasley 49'; Roner 54' (o.g.)		Ekelund 5'; Donovan 38', 71'; Mulrooney 50'

Home Depot Center
Carson, California
Attendance: 27,000

== Player statistics ==
=== Goals ===
Rank	Player	Club	Goals
1	(Guatemala) Carlos Ruiz	Los Angeles Galaxy	15
1	(United States) Taylor Twellman	New England Revolution	15
3	(United States) Ante Razov	Chicago Fire	14
3	(Scotland) John Spencer	Colorado Rapids	14
5	(United States) Landon Donovan	San Jose Earthquakes	12
5	(United States) Brian McBride	Columbus Crew	12
5	(United States) Preki	Kansas City Wizards	12
8	(United States) Mark Chung	Colorado Rapids	11
8	(Jamaica) Damani Ralph	Chicago Fire	11
10	(United States) Edson Buddle	Columbus Crew	10
10	(United States) Pat Noonan	New England Revolution	10

=== Assists ===
Rank	Player	Club	Assists
1	(United States) Preki	Kansas City Wizards	12
2	(Honduras) Amado Guevara	MetroStars	9
3	(United States) Mark Lisi	MetroStars	6
3	(United States) Ross Paule	Columbus Crew	6
3	(United States) Steve Ralston	New England Revolution	6
6	(United States) Cobi Jones	Los Angeles Galaxy	5
6	(United States) Manny Lagos	San Jose Earthquakes	5
6	(United States) Brian Mullan	San Jose Earthquakes	5
6	(United States) Richard Mulrooney	San Jose Earthquakes	5
6	(United States) Pat Noonan	New England Revolution	5
6	(United States) Eric Quill	Kansas City Wizards	5
6	(Jamaica) Andy Williams	Chicago Fire	5

=== Clean sheets ===
Rank	Player	Club	Clean sheets
1	(United States) Scott Garlick	Colorado Rapids	9
1	(Canada) Pat Onstad	San Jose Earthquakes	9
3	(United States) Zach Thornton	Chicago Fire	8
4	(United States) Nick Rimando	D.C. United	7
5	(United States) Adin Brown	New England Revolution	4
5	(United States) Jon Busch	Columbus Crew	4
5	(United States) Kevin Hartman	LA Galaxy	4
5	(United States) Tony Meola	Kansas City Wizards	4
5	(United States) Jonny Walker	MetroStars	4
10	(United States) D.J. Countess	Dallas Burn	3
10	(United States) Tim Howard	MetroStars	3

== Awards ==
=== Individual awards ===
Award	Player	Club
Most Valuable Player	(United States) Preki	Kansas City Wizards
Defender of the Year	(United States) Carlos Bocanegra	Chicago Fire
Goalkeeper of the Year	(Canada) Pat Onstad	San Jose Earthquakes
Coach of the Year	(United States) Dave Sarachan	Chicago Fire
Rookie of the Year	(Jamaica) Damani Ralph	Chicago Fire
Comeback Player of the Year	(United States) Chris Armas	Chicago Fire
Scoring Champion	(United States) Preki	Kansas City Wizards
Goal of the Year	(Jamaica) Damani Ralph	Chicago Fire
Fair Play Award	(United States) Brian McBride	Columbus Crew
Humanitarian of the Year	(United States) Ben Olsen	D.C. United

=== Best XI ===
Goalkeeper	Defenders	Midfielders	Forwards
(United States) Tim Howard, MetroStars	(United States) Wade Barrett, San Jose (United States) Carlos Bocanegra, Chicago (United States) Alexi Lalas, LA Galaxy	(United States) Mark Chung, Colorado (Denmark) Ronnie Ekelund, San Jose (Colombia) Óscar Pareja, Dallas (United States) Steve Ralston, New England	(United States) Jeff Cunningham, Columbus (Guatemala) Carlos Ruiz, LA Galaxy (United States) Taylor Twellman, New England

== Attendance ==
Club	Games	Season	Game Avg.
Los Angeles Galaxy	15	329,752	21,983
Colorado Rapids	15	251,578	16,772
Columbus Crew	15	243,756	16,250
MetroStars	15	237,326	15,822
Kansas City Wizards	15	233,594	15,573
D.C. United	15	233,476	15,565
New England Revolution	15	219,611	14,641
Chicago Fire	15	210,080	14,005
San Jose Earthquakes	15	156,989	10,466
Dallas Burn	15	118,585	7,906
Totals	150	2,234,747	14,898
