= Brian Ching =

American soccer player (born 1978)

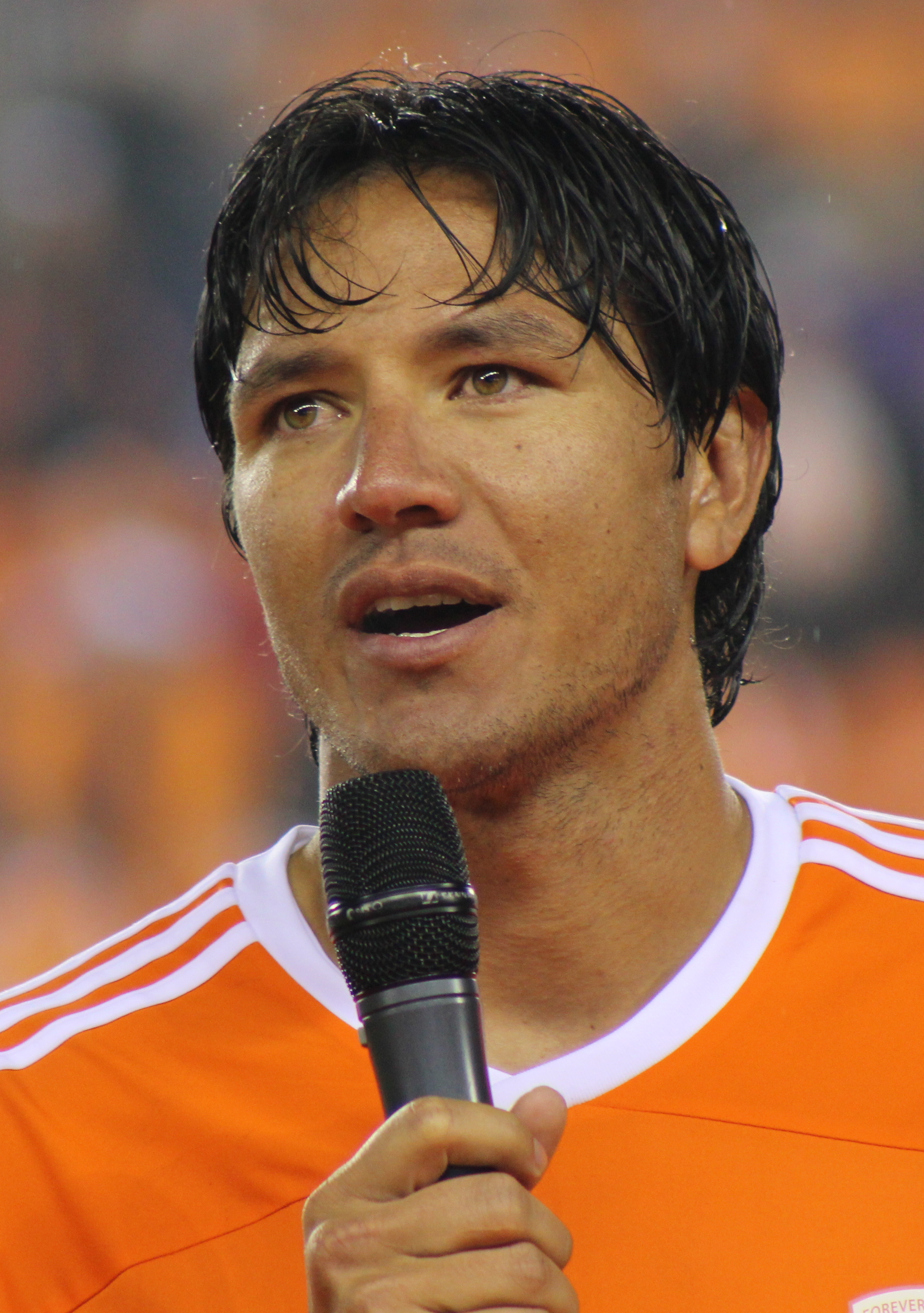
- Brian Ching speaks to the crowd at BBVA Compass Stadium in Houston in December 2013 after his testimonial match

Personal information
- Full name: Brian Ching
- Date of birth: May 24, 1978 (age 48)
- Place of birth: Hale'iwa, Hawaii, United States
- Height: 6 ft 1 in (1.85 m)
- Position: Forward

Youth career
- 1995–1996: Kamehameha Schools-Kapālama
- 1996: Honolulu Bulls

College career
Years	Team	Apps	(Gls)
1996–2000	Gonzaga Bulldogs		

Senior career*
Years	Team	Apps	(Gls)
1998–1999	Spokane Shadow	32	(21)
2001	LA Galaxy	8	(1)
2001	→ Seattle Sounders (loan)	6	(3)
2002	Seattle Sounders	25	(16)
2003–2005	San Jose Earthquakes	56	(25)
2006–2013	Houston Dynamo	169	(56)
Total		296	(122)

International career
2003–2010	United States	45	(11)

Managerial career
- 2013: Houston Dynamo (assistant)
- 2013–2019: Houston Dash (managing director)
Medal record
Representing United States
Men's soccer
Winner	2007 United States
Runner-up	2009 United States
- * Club domestic league appearances and goals

Brian Ching (born May 24, 1978) is an American former professional soccer player who played for twelve years in Major League Soccer and represented the U.S. national team for eight years.

Ching's professional career began when he was the 16th pick overall by the Los Angeles Galaxy in the 2001 MLS SuperDraft, making him the first Gonzaga player and the first player from his native Hawaii selected in the MLS draft. After winning the U.S. Open Cup with Los Angeles, Ching was released from the team and played with the second division Seattle Sounders. He returned to first division soccer when the San Jose Earthquakes acquired him in the 2003 MLS supplemental draft. He won an MLS Cup and Supporters' Shield with the Earthquakes, collected the MLS Comeback Player of the Year Award, the MLS Golden Boot, and was named to the MLS Best XI.

In 2006, Ching relocated to Houston when the Earthquakes became the Houston Dynamo. He led the team to back-to-back MLS Cup Championships in 2006 and 2007 and four MLS finals overall. A six-time MLS All-Star, Ching retired from professional soccer in 2013 as Houston Dynamo's all-time leading scorer.

Ching made his international debut May 26, 2003, becoming the first Hawaiian-born player to represent the United States. He became the first Hawaiian to be named to the U.S. roster for the 2006 FIFA World Cup, although he did not see any playing time. His only international silverware is the 2007 Gold Cup. Off the field, Ching is a pillar in the Houston community where he is partnered with Habitat for Humanity to build homes for underprivileged families in the Houston area through fundraising efforts under his program "The House that Ching Built".

== Early life ==
Ching lost his father, Francis, to cancer on December 25, 1992, when he was 14 years old. Stephanie Whalen, Ching's mother, raised him and his two brothers as a single parent. Ching did not play soccer until he was seven years old, agreeing to only if his mother would coach. Ching is one quarter Chinese and one quarter Native Hawaiian.

Ching attended Kamehameha Schools Kapālama High School in Honolulu and played in the soccer team in his junior and senior year. He was named as the Interscholastic League of Honolulu's MVP during his senior year with 14 goals and six assists. His junior year he was a second team All-ILH selection.

During his last year of high school Ching played with the Honolulu Bulls Soccer Club, a club team, and traveled to tournaments on the mainland where he was noticed by the Gonzaga coaching staff. He went on to play for the Gonzaga Bulldogs men's soccer program under head coach Einar Thorarinsson, whom Ching credits "for believing in him and providing him the skills to grow and mature to be able to compete at the next level."

During his collegiate career, Ching played for the Spokane Shadow of the Premier Development Soccer League (where Gonzaga coach Einar Thorarinsson was also the coach of the Shadow) and set a total of 21 goals during his stint in the 1998 and 1999 seasons. Ching was named the PDSL rookie of the year in 1998.

=== Collegiate career ===
Ching joined the Bulldogs for the 1996 season, and as a freshman played in 18 matches with five starts. He finished second on the team in scoring with 12 points on three goals and six assists. As a sophomore, he appeared in 16 matches with 14 starts and was second on the team behind West Coast Conference Player of the Year and teammate Jeff McAllister with 10 goals and 23 points, ranking fifth in the WCC in both categories. The 10 goals were second on the all-time Gonzaga single-season list and his 23 points were third on the all-time GU list. He earned All-WCC second-team honors.

His junior season was cut short by a knee injury suffered in the season opener, then re-injured in the next match, and received a medical redshirt year. Ching missed the entire 1998 season after surgery to repair injured meniscus in right knee.

The injury bug continued to plague Ching in the summer of 1999 when he was kicked in the cheek and eye while playing for the Spokane Shadow of the USL, the injury requiring surgery. Despite that injury, Ching was ready for the Bulldogs season opener and went on to start 17 of 18 matches. He scored 13 goals and had 8 assists for 34 points. The 13 goals were third on the all-time GU single-season list, the 34 points second. He scored his first goal of the season in a 2–2 tie against 11th-ranked Washington Huskies, got the insurance goal in a 3–1 victory over 7th-ranked Stanford and had a pair of goals against 4th-ranked University of San Diego in 4–2 home victory. He earned All-WCC first-team honors.

His final season of 2000, Ching missed three matches with an injury but still scored eight goals and recorded 22 points. He was named All-WCC first team and earned All-Far West Region first-team honors. Ching finished his Gonzaga career with 34 goals, which still ties him third on the all-time GU list, and his 23 assists are a Gonzaga career record. Ching's 91 career points are still tied for second on the Gonzaga charts. With Ching, the Bulldogs were back-to-back co-champions of the West Coast Conference in 1997 and 1998. Ching majored in accounting.

== Club career ==
=== Los Angeles Galaxy (2001) and Seattle Sounders (2001–2002) ===
My first year in the league, I'm on the team with Cobi Jones, Cienfuegos, Alexi Lalas, Robin Fraser, Kevin Hartman, Matt Reis, Sasha Victorine, and Brian Mullan. For those guys to all be on one team my first year in the league, now that I look back on it, that was pretty special. Significant guys that have done a lot for U.S. soccer, to be on that team was a gift for me.

— Brian Ching on his first year in MLS

Ching began his professional career when the Los Angeles Galaxy drafted him as the 16th overall pick of the 2001 MLS SuperDraft. Los Angeles chose midfielder Brian Mullan and forward Isaias Bardales Jr. in the first round, 9th and 11th respectively, before picking Ching with their fourth pick in the second round. Ching was the first ever Hawaiian selected in the MLS draft.

Ching joined a roster that included U.S. Soccer Hall of Fame players Cobi Jones, Alexi Lalas, and Paul Caligiuri, Mexico's top World Cup scorer Luis Hernández, Mauricio Cienfuegos, Ezra Hendrickson, Danny Califf, Kevin Hartman and was coached by Sigi Schmid. Ching wore the number 9 jersey with Los Angeles. Ching made his MLS debut against San Jose on April 7, 2001, as a member of the starting lineup. During the 2001 season, Ching appeared in eight games (starting one) and recorded one goal and one assist.

Ching started and played the full match in his U.S. Open Cup debut, a 5–0 victory over the Nashville Metros at Titan Stadium on June 27, 2001, in the second round. Ching went the full 90 again in Los Angeles' 3–1 victory over the Seattle Sounders Select where he provided the assist to Isaias Bardales' 81st-minute goal, the Galaxy's third of the match. Those would be Ching's only appearances in the 2001 tournament as the Los Angeles Galaxy went on to win their first U.S. Open Cup trophy in franchise history.

Ching made his MLS Cup playoffs debut in a 4–1 loss in Game 2 of the quarterfinals against the New York-New Jersey MetroStars on September 27, 2001, after coming on as an 88th minute substitution for Cobi Jones. Ching appeared for a second time in the playoffs in the Galaxy's 1–0 overtime win in Game 2 of the MLS semifinal series against the Chicago Fire on October 14, 2001, entering the game in the 91st minute for Sasha Victorine. The Galaxy advanced to the 2001 MLS Cup final and tied 1–1 with the San Jose Earthquakes in regulation before Dwayne De Rosario's golden goal in the 96th minute ended the match.

After signing Carlos Ruiz, the Galaxy waived Ching on February 13, 2002, to comply with the MLS roster limits. One month later, he signed with the Seattle Sounders of the A-League where scored four goals and provided one assist in seven games the previous year when he was on loan from Los Angeles. Ching finished the 2002 season second in the A-League in scoring with 16 goals and eight assists, and was selected as a member of the A-League All-League first team.

=== San Jose Earthquakes (2003–2005) ===
The first time the Earthquakes coaching staff got a good look at Brian Ching was facing him in the July 17, 2002, third round match of the U.S. Open Cup when San Jose defeated the Seattle Sounders 4–3 after sudden death extra time. Kinnear, assistant coach at the time, and head coach Frank Yallop were impressed with how Ching matched up with Earthquakes defender Eddie Robinson, considered one of the best defenders in MLS at the time. Ching began training with the Earthquakes the following January. On February 11, 2003, San Jose traded Devin Barclay to D.C. United in exchange for the first overall pick in the 2003 MLS supplemental draft and on February 28, 2013, they used that pick to draft Ching.

Ching made his official Earthquakes debut in Guatemala City on March 16, 2003, playing a full match in a 4–2 Champions' Cup loss to C.S.D. Municipal. He played his first Earthquakes home game in the second leg against Municipal where he scored the first goal in the 35th minute. Ching made his first Earthquakes start in the MLS regular season on April 12, 2003, at Colorado Rapids and scored 53 seconds into the game. He would miss five games due to a right hamstring strain before returning to the starting lineup to score two goals for his first multi-goal game in MLS on July 2, 2003, at the MetroStars. He played 90 minutes in his first encounter against his old club Seattle Sounders on August 5 but the 1–0 loss eliminated San Jose from the 2003 Open Cup.

Ching left the August 16, 2003, game at New England Revolution with a ruptured right Achilles tendon. He underwent surgery on August 19 and missed the rest of the 2003 season as the San Jose Earthquakes went on to win the 2003 MLS Cup. Ching scored a then-career-high six goals and two assists during 2003. He was named to the MLS Team of the Week for April 12 and May 3, 2003.

Ching returned from injury in the 2004 Champions' Cup as a sub in both legs against eventual champion L.D. Alajuelense. Ching made his first start of the season on May 1 vs. D.C. United. Ching finished with a career-high 12 goals in MLS, sharing the MLS Golden Boot with Eddie Johnson. He was named to the MLS Best XI and recognized as the MLS Comeback Player of the Year. He also finished as the Earthquakes scoring champion and Most Valuable Player for the 2004 season.

In 2005, Ching scored seven goals in 16 games and tallied a career-high five assists in MLS play. He registered a goal or an assist in five straight games before missing 15 matches with a hamstring injury. He ended the regular season having recorded a goal or assist in six straight games. The San Jose Earthquakes finished the 2005 season with the best regular season record, clinching the Supporters' Shield. After the most successful regular season in team history with an 18–4–10 record and 64 points, the Earthquakes were placed on hiatus on December 15, 2005, with the franchise moving to Houston.

=== Houston Dynamo (2006–2013) ===
Along with the rest of his Earthquakes teammates, Ching moved to Houston for the 2006 season. He scored four goals in Houston's first-ever game on April 2, 2006, against the Colorado Rapids, becoming the seventh player in MLS history to score four goals in a single game. Ching found out he had been selected to U.S. world cup team on May 2 and celebrated with a game-deciding goal the following MLS fixture, May 6, against rival club FC Dallas. Ching missed six MLS games while he was with the U.S. national team at the 2006 FIFA World Cup. His bicycle kick on September 30 vs. D.C. United, which would later be awarded the MLS Goal of the Year Award, was the deciding goal in a 1–0 win that secured Houston's first ever MLS playoff spot.

In the 2006 MLS Cup playoffs, Ching scored the series-winning goal with a header in stoppage time of the 2–0 win vs. Chivas USA in the second leg of the Western Conference semifinals. He was named MVP of MLS Cup 2006 after scoring the tying goal in the 114th minute, less than one minute after New England Revolution had taken a 1–0 lead, and scoring the winning penalty kick in the penalty kick shootout.

In 2007, Ching ended the season tied for the team lead with seven goals despite missing 10 games entirely due to injuries and national-team call-ups. He contributed in the 2007 MLS Cup playoffs with two playoff goals but sat out the 2007 MLS Cup final after straining his calf in the Western Conference final. He led Houston's comeback from a 2–0 aggregate deficit in the second leg of the Western Conference semifinal vs. FC Dallas on November 2, setting up Stuart Holden's goal in the 67th minute and then scoring himself from a Dwayne De Rosario through ball in the 72nd minute to tie the series. In extra time, of that game, he scored from close range in the 97th minute to give Houston the lead for good.

Ching was a staple in the Dynamo lineup during international competition. In the 2007 CONCACAF Champions' Cup he set up the series-winning goal against Puntarenas F.C. when his header hit the post and Kelly Gray scored on the rebound. Ching scored the opening goal in the semifinal first leg vs. C.F. Pachuca on March 15, heading in a Craig Waibel cross. In the semifinal second leg at Estadio Hidalgo on April 5, he set up the first Houston goal by keeping the ball in on the sideline, leading to Brian Mullan's goal and later scored in the 79th minute to give Houston a 4–3 aggregate lead before Pachuca rallied to win in extra time. Ching also participated in the 2007 Superliga, playing in all three group stage matches. He set up goal just 11 seconds into match vs. Monarcas Morelia on July 29, passing to Joseph Ngwenya for the fastest goal in Dynamo history. Ching scored the only goal in 1–0 win vs. D.C. United on August 1 and hit the post with the fourth penalty kick in the Dynamo's semifinal shootout loss vs. Pachuca on August 14.

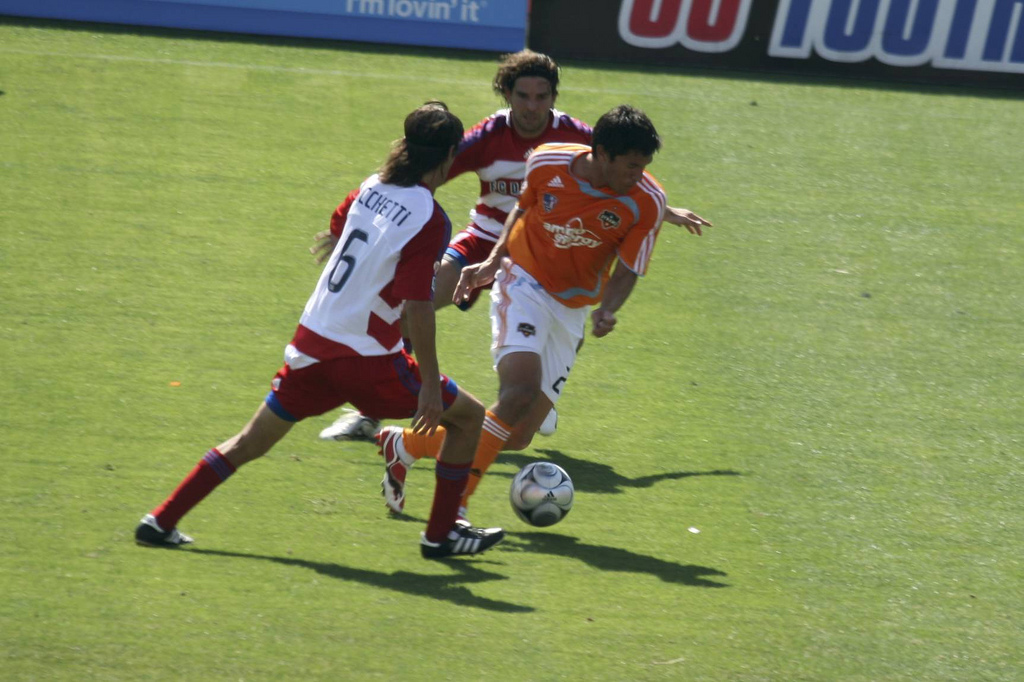
Ching dribbles by two FC Dallas defenders in a match at Robertson Stadium in April 2008

During the 2008 season, Ching established team and personal records with 13 goals in the regular season and five assists in 25 games. Ching ranked fifth in the league in goals. In the team's second visit to San Jose since relocating to Houston, Ching scored a game-tying goal in second half and celebrated by pointing to the Dynamo crest in front of San Jose fans. In the final CONCACAF Champions' Cup he set up two of Houston's three goals in the quarterfinal second leg vs. CSD Municipal. In the 2008 Superliga he appeared in three games, starting the semifinal vs. Pachuca and the championship game at New England Revolution. In the inaugural CONCACAF Champions League, Ching appeared as a substitute at San Francisco F.C. and started vs. C.D. Luis Ángel Firpo, scoring the game's only goal to help Dynamo reach the quarterfinals.

Ching's performance during the 2009 season earned him Dynamo's Golden Boot for the third straight year with eight goals and three assists. He became seventh Dynamo player to make 100th starts for the club in all competitions and assisted on Cam Weaver's game-tying goal in the 80th minute of a 2–1 loss at Columbus Crew on September 13. In the 2008–09 CONCACAF Champions League Ching played all 90 minutes of both legs of the quarterfinal series vs. C.F. Atlante. He appeared in five games of the 2009–10 CONCACAF Champions League, making three starts. In the 2009 MLS Cup playoffs, he netted the game-winning goal in 95th minute of a 1–0 overtime win vs. Seattle, swiveling to volley a shot into the left side netting for his 50th Dynamo goal in all competitions.

Ching ran into disciplinary trouble during the 2009 campaign. In July 2009, Ching was fined $500 by MLS for his comments regarding the officiating of the Dynamo's 2–1 loss to Seattle Sounders FC (a game Ching did not play in due to participation in the 2009 CONCACAF Gold Cup). On his Twitter page, Ching referred to the referee as "a joke" and "a cheat" for calling a Fredy Montero shot cleared off the line a goal. Ching scored the opening goal from a Brad Davis free kick in 3–2 win vs. Real Salt Lake on August 19 but was ejected in the 82nd minute for hard foul, the first red card in the 162 games of his MLS career. He was ejected again in next MLS game, a 0–0 tie vs. Los Angeles Galaxy on October 18, for raising his hand to the face of an opponent.

In 2010, Ching shrugged off injuries and national team disappointment to score seven goals and add three assists in 20 games, making 16 starts, to win the team's Golden Boot for the fourth straight year. His August 21 bicycle kick against Chicago was named ESPNSoccernet.com's MLS Goal of the Year and Dynamo Goal of the Year. He took over as the Dynamo team captain after the retirement of Wade Barrett. He was named as Don Garber's Commissioner's Pick for the 2010 MLS All-Star Game in Houston, a game where he came on as second-half substitute and scored with a header to cut the deficit to 2-1 vs. Manchester United F.C. The Dynamo missed the playoffs in 2010.

Ching was limited to 1,242 minutes in 20 appearances due to injury in 2011, the lowest minute total of his Houston career, but still tied for team lead with five goals. He started all four matches the Dynamo took part in the 2011 MLS Cup playoffs, scoring a goal and adding an assist, to help lead the Dynamo back to the MLS Cup final. He started and set up the game-winning goal with left-footed through ball in 2–1 first-leg win at Philadelphia Union and scored the game-winning goal with header from a Brad Davis free kick in a 1–0 win the second-leg, scoring the final MLS goal at Robertson Stadium. Ching started the Eastern Conference championship match at Sporting Kansas City and closed the night by hoisting the trophy as team captain after the 2–0 win. He made his second career start in an MLS Cup final at Los Angeles, who denied the Dynamo the title with a narrow 1–0 victory.

==== Montreal Impact, return to Houston and retirement (2011–2013) ====
Ching was left exposed by Houston in the 2011 MLS expansion draft and was selected by expansion side Montreal Impact less than a week after playing in the MLS Cup final. Ching was traded back to Houston on February 16, 2012, for a first-round draft pick in the 2013 MLS SuperDraft, after training with Montreal for about a month, coincidentally playing a preseason game against the Houston Dynamo.

Ching started opening day on for the Dynamo for the sixth time in seven years and nearly scored at Chivas USA when his first-touch volley off a long cross from Brad Davis hit inside of post and caromed away for near goal. Ching made his 200th MLS appearance (136th with Dynamo) in 3–1 loss to Vancouver Whitecaps FC on June 10. Ching made his 150th Dynamo start in all competitions against D.C. United on April 28, the 4th Dynamo to reach this milestone. Ching drew and converted a penalty in the 83rd minute on June 30 vs. Philadelphia, his second goal of the year and first at BBVA Compass Stadium. The goal against Philadelphia was his 20th career game-winning goal. He would go on to set a career-high with 30 games in 2012 regular season, tying his career-high of five assists.

Ching signed a deal in early 2013 to return to the Dynamo as a player-coach and later announced his retirement effective at the end of the 2013 season. Ching officially announced his intention to retire at the end of the 2013 Major League Soccer season on September 24, 2013, although he played his final professional minutes in a 4–1 loss to the New York Red Bulls on Sunday, September 8, 2013. He made two more appearances on the match day squad, his last being in a CONCACAF Champions League game on September 25, 2013, but was an unused substitution.

Ching did not feature in the Dynamo's 2013 MLS Cup playoffs run as he was not called up to the matchday squad for any of the playoff games. The Dynamo were eliminated by Sporting Kansas City in the Eastern Conference championship game on November 23, 2013, thus bringing an official end to Ching's 12-year MLS career.

== International career ==
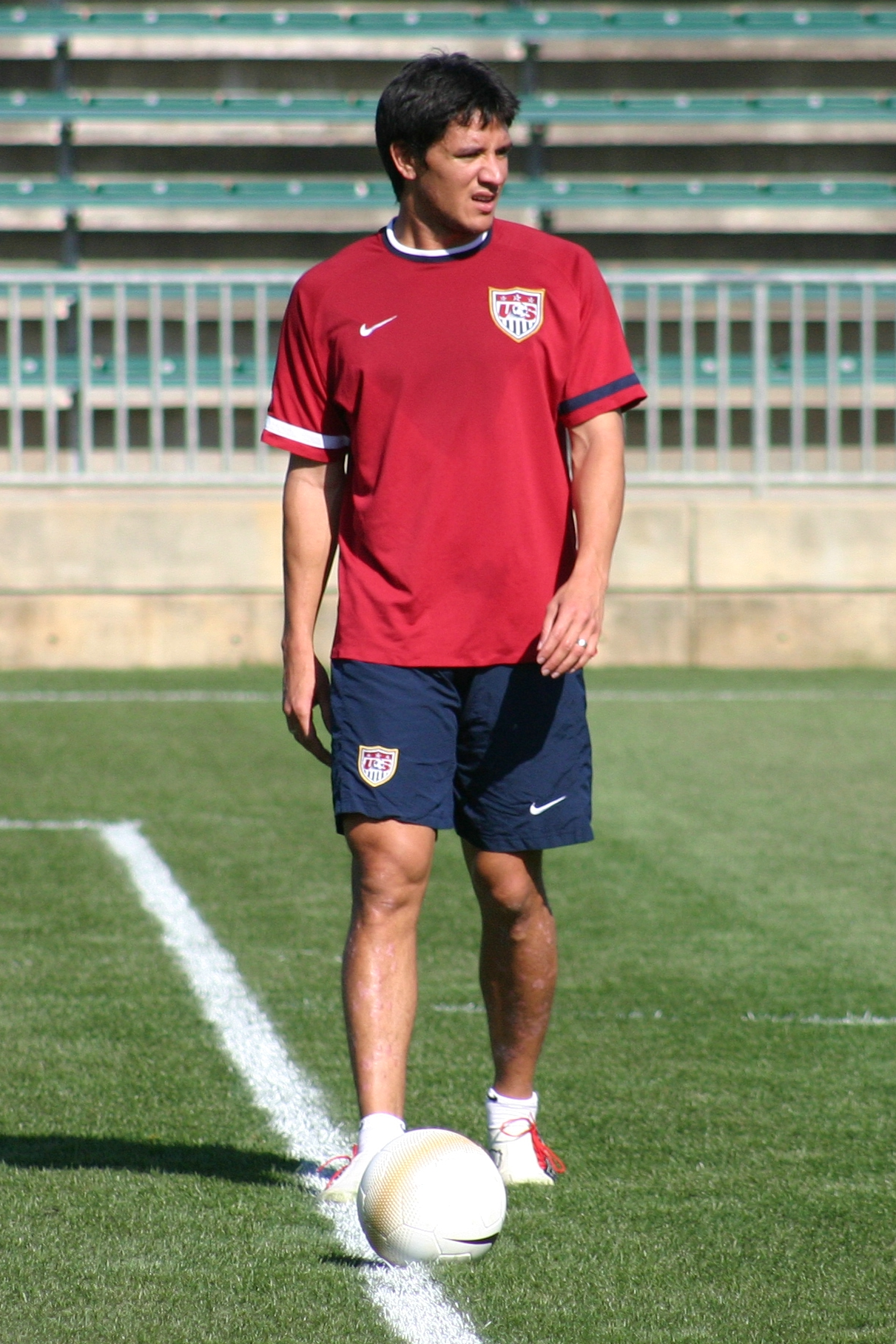
Ching training with the U.S. national team in 2006

Although having a Chinese background, and being contacted by the Chinese Football Association to play for the Chinese team, Ching still earned his first cap with the U.S. national team on May 26, 2003, as a substitute in a friendly match against Wales at Spartan Stadium (home stadium of Ching's club at the time, San Jose Earthquakes). He is the first Hawaiian and the second Chinese-American (after Mark Chung) to play for the United States. Ching scored his first international goal, an equalizer in the 88th minute, in a World Cup qualifier 1–1 tie against Jamaica in Kingston on August 18, 2004.

On May 2, 2006, Ching was named to the U.S. men's squad for the 2006 FIFA World Cup in Germany but did not make an appearance in the tournament.

He scored a goal in a 2–0 US CONCACAF Gold Cup victory over Trinidad and Tobago on June 9, 2007. He drew a penalty in the box of the second half of the Gold Cup Final against Mexico. Landon Donovan converted the penalty, tying the game at one. The USA won 2–1 after Benny Feilhaber's game winner.

Ching was called in to the USA side to face Barbados in the first round of CONCACAF World cup Qualifying for the 2010 World Cup. He then scored two goals in the US team's largest victory ever, 8–0.

On May 11, 2010, Ching was named to the preliminary U.S. men's squad for the 2010 FIFA World Cup in South Africa but did not make the final 23-man roster.

== Career statistics ==
=== Club ===
As of December 18, 2013

Club	Season	League (Note: Includes Major League Soccer and A-League)			Playoffs (Note: Includes MLS Cup Playoffs and A-League Playoffs)			Cup (Note: Includes U.S. Open Cup and Canadian Championship)			Continental (Note: Includes CONCACAF Champions' Cup, CONCACAF Champions League, and North American SuperLiga)			Total		
Club	Season	Apps	Goals	Assists	Apps	Goals	Assists	Apps	Goals	Assists	Apps	Goals	Assists	Apps	Goals	Assists
Los Angeles Galaxy	2001	8	1	1	2	0	0	2	0	1	—			12	1	2
Los Angeles Galaxy	Total	8	1	1	2	0	0	2	0	1	0	0	0	12	1	2
Seattle Sounders	2001 (loan)	6	3	1	—			—			—			6	3	1
Seattle Sounders	2002	25	16	8	2	0	0	2	1	0	—			29	17	8
Seattle Sounders	Total	31	19	9	2	0	0	2	1	0	0	0	0	35	20	9
San Jose Earthquakes	2003	15	6	2	0	0	0	1	0	0	2	1	0	18	7	2
San Jose Earthquakes	2004	25	12	4	2	0	0	3	1	1	2	0	0	32	13	5
San Jose Earthquakes	2005	16	7	5	2	1	0	0	0	0	—			18	8	5
San Jose Earthquakes	Total	56	25	11	4	1	0	4	1	1	4	1	0	68	28	12
Houston Dynamo	2006	21	11	2	4	3	0	1	0	0	—			26	14	2
Houston Dynamo	2007	20	7	2	3	2	1	0	0	0	6	3	2	26	12	5
Houston Dynamo	2008	25	13	5	2	0	0	0	0	0	9	1	2	33	14	7
Houston Dynamo	2009	19	8	3	3	1	0	0	0	0	7	1	1	29	10	4
Houston Dynamo	2010	20	7	3	—			0	0	0	3	0	0	20	7	3
Houston Dynamo	2011	20	5	1	4	1	1	0	0	0	—			24	6	2
Houston Dynamo	2012	30	5	5	4	0	0	0	0	0	3	1	0	37	6	5
Houston Dynamo	2013	14	0	1	0	0	0	2	0	0	3	0	0	19	0	1
Houston Dynamo	Total	169	56	22	20	7	2	3	0	0	32	6	5	224	69	29
Career total		264	101	43	28	8	2	11	2	2	36	7	5	339	118	52

Note that:

- Cells marked with an em dash (—) indicate the player did not participate in that competition because the club did not qualify, was eliminated, or the player was no longer with the club before the start of the competition.
- In competitions where the player has zero appearances, the club qualified and played in that competition and the player was registered and eligible to play. Player did not appear due to injury or was not selected by the coach.

== Notes ==
=== International ===
National team	Year	Apps	Goals
United States	2003	1	0
United States	2004	4	2
United States	2005	6	0
United States	2006	9	2
United States	2007	5	1
United States	2008	7	4
United States	2009	11	1
United States	2010	2	1
Total		45	11

==== International goals ====
Scores and results list United States' goal tally first

Result	Competition	Location	Opponent	Score	Result	Competition
01.	August 18, 2004	Independence Park, Kingston, Jamaica	Jamaica	1 – 1	1 – 1	Q 2006 World Cup
02.	October 9, 2004	Gillette Stadium, Foxborough, USA	El Salvador	1 – 0	2 – 0	Q 2006 World Cup
03.	February 19, 2006	Pizza Hut Park, Frisco, USA	Guatemala	2 – 0	4 – 0	Friendly
04.	May 26, 2006	Cleveland Browns Stadium, Cleveland, USA	Venezuela	1 – 0	2 – 0	Friendly
05.	June 9, 2007	Home Depot Center, Carson, USA	Trinidad and Tobago	2 – 0	2 – 0	2007 CONCACAF Gold Cup
06.	June 15, 2008	Home Depot Center, Carson, USA	Barbados	3 – 0	8 – 0	Q 2010 World Cup
07.	June 15, 2008	Home Depot Center, Carson, USA	Barbados	8 – 0	8 – 0	Q 2010 World Cup
08.	September 10, 2008	Toyota Park, Bridgeview, USA	Trinidad and Tobago	2 – 0	3 – 0	Q 2010 World Cup
09.	June 21, 2008	RFK Stadium, Washington, D.C., USA	Cuba	4 – 1	6 – 1	Q 2010 World Cup
10.	July 8, 2009	RFK Stadium, Washington, D.C., USA	Honduras	2 – 0	2 – 0	2009 CONCACAF Gold Cup
11.	February 24, 2010	Raymond James Stadium, Tampa, Florida, USA	El Salvador	1 – 1	2 – 1	Friendly

== Management career ==
The Houston Dynamo re-signed Ching in March 2013 to serve as a player/coach in his last year playing. Under his last contract with the MLS club, Ching served the title of assistant coach.

On December 23, 2013, the Houston Dash named Ching as the inaugural managing director the NWSL franchise. Ching manages the day-to-day duties on both the business and technical sides under the supervision of Dash and Dynamo team president Chris Canetti. The role shares similar responsibilities as the general manager tag, with the addition of branding Ching as "the face of the team" so that he can gin up sales and awareness by making himself publicly available as the face of the organization. While his focus will be primarily with the Dash, Ching will also advise Canetti and head coach Dominic Kinnear as needed on the technical side with the Dynamo.

=== Managerial statistics ===
As of December 28, 2012.

Note: Only regular season matches are shown for the MLS teams

Team	From	To	Record				
Team	From	To	P	W	L	D	Win %
Houston Dynamo (assistant)	March 2013	December 2013	34	14	11	9	41.18
Houston Dash (managing director)	December 2013	January 2019	0	0	0	0	—
Total			34	14	11	9	41.18

== Testimonial match ==
On September 24, 2013, the Houston Dynamo and Dynamo Charities announced a Brian Ching Testimonial Match to celebrate the career of the retiring forward, with proceeds from the match to benefit Ching's charitable initiative, The House That Ching Built. The match, which took place on December 13, 2013, featured historical Dynamo players as well as Ching's old teammates from other MLS clubs and the U.S. national team. Ching's Orange Team won 6–4 and Ching scored five goals to close the curtain on his career.

December 13, 2013
7:30 p.m. CST

Orange	6-4	White
Ching 10', 21', 23', 48' (pen.), 69'; Davis 41'	Report	Carr 8', 57'; Ralston 31'; Galavis 46'

BBVA Compass Stadium, Houston
Attendance: 6,528
Referee: Ismail Elfath (United States)

Orange	White

GK	18	(Canada) Pat Onstad		Substituted off
RB	16	(United States) Craig Waibel		Substituted off
CB	4	(United States) Ryan Cochrane		Substituted off
CB	7	(United States) Chris Wondolowski		Substituted off
LB	24	(United States) Wade Barrett		Substituted off
RM	9	(United States) Brian Mullan		Substituted off
CM	2	(United States) Eddie Robinson		Substituted off
CM	11	(United States) Brad Davis
LM	17	(United States) Mike Chabala		Substituted off
ST	14	(Canada) Dwayne De Rosario		Substituted off
ST	25	(United States) Brian Ching		(substituted off) 70'
Substitutes:
GK	24	(United States) Tyler Deric		Substituted on
MF	6	(United States) Kelly Gray		Substituted on
FW	8	(Scotland) Paul Dalglish		Substituted on
FW	33	(United States) Dominic Kinnear	(yellow card) 20'	Substituted on
FW	21	(United States) Nate Jaqua		Substituted on
Coaches/Inactive:
(United States) Stuart Holden
(United States) Corey Ashe
(United States) Ricardo Clark

GK	20	(United States) Landon Donovan
RB	12	(United States) Jimmy Conrad	(yellow card) 47'	Substituted off
CB	32	(United States) Bobby Boswell		Substituted off
CB	2	(United States) Hunter Freeman		Substituted off
LB	21	(United States) Anthony Arena		Substituted off
RM	22	(United States) Davy Arnaud		Substituted off
CM	27	(Honduras) Oscar Boniek García		Substituted off
CM	11	(United States) Colin Clark		Substituted off
LM	19	(United States) Juan Pablo Galavis		Substituted off
ST	14	(United States) Steve Ralston		Substituted off
ST	3	(United States) Calen Carr		Substituted off
Substitutes:
MF	7	(Scotland) John Spencer		Substituted on
MF	5	(United States) Danny O'Rourke		Substituted on
Coaches/Inactive:
(United States) Matt Reis
(United States) Charlie Davies

Man of the Match:
(United States) Brian Ching (Orange)

Match rules

- 70 minutes (35 minute halves)
- Unlimited substitutions.

== Honors ==
My legacy? I just want to be known as a hardworking guy who overachieved and is a winner. I think there's always been more talented people out there and whatnot. But I've accomplished a lot, more than I ever thought I would, because of my desire and my desire to compete.

— Brian Ching in an interview with the Houston Chronicle.

LA Galaxy

- U.S. Open Cup: 2001
- Western Conference Championship: 2001

Seattle Sounders

- A-League Commissioner's Cup: 2002

San Jose Earthquakes

- MLS Cup: 2003
- Supporters' Shield: 2005
- Western Conference Championship: 2003

Houston Dynamo

- MLS Cup: 2006, 2007
- Western Conference Championship: 2006, 2007
- Eastern Conference Championship: 2011, 2012

United States

- CONCACAF Gold Cup: 2007; runner-up: 2009

Individual

- MLS All-Star (6): 2004, 2006, 2007, 2008, 2009, 2010
- MLS Best XI (1): 2004
- MLS Comeback Player of the Year (1): 2004
- MLS Golden Boot (1): 2004
- MLS Goal of the Year (1): 2006
- A-League All-League First Team (1): 2002
- USL PDL Rookie of the Year (1): 1998
- MLS Cup MVP (1): 2006
- San Jose Earthquakes MVP (1): 2004
- Houston Dynamo MVP (1): 2008
- Houston Dynamo Golden Boot (3): 2008, 2009, 2010
- Houston Dynamo Humanitarian of the Year (2): 2010, 2013
- West Coast Conference Hall Of Honor: 2011

== Off the field ==
=== Social Causes ===
==== Ching's Champions ====
Each fall since 2012, Ching and Kroger honored members of the Houston community who were chosen as "Ching's Champions." The Ching's Champions initiative was started by Ching and Kroger as a way to pay tribute to those members of the Houston community who perform selfless acts for others. Each of the winners gets to take part in a shopping spree with Ching at a Houston-area Kroger.

Eight champions were selected in 2012 from the group of nominees and each winner received a Ching's Champions medal and a four-minute shopping spree at Kroger. The 2012 winners collected over $7,700 worth of groceries. In 2013, the five "champions" were able to secure over $9,000 of groceries and merchandise during the 250-second shopping spree.

==== The House that Ching Built ====
In 2009, Ching made a commitment to give back to his adopted community by raising money to build an affordable home through Houston Habitat for Humanity. With the support of Dynamo Charities and MLS W.O.R.K.S., Ching has raised $75,000 to sponsor the build through personal appearances, events, individual giving and corporate partnerships.

The funds raised exceeded Ching's initial goal and allowed Houston Habitat to upgrade the home with green features, including solar panels and a solar hot water heater through a grant from Green Mountain Energy. The Milby Park build was completed in 2010 and welcomed the Urbano family with a home dedication in May 2011.

Along with the announcement of the testimonial match to be played in honor of his retirement at the end of the 2013 season, Ching committed to fundraise $85,000 to build a "green" house for another local Houston family in need. Almost half of the donations for the 2013 project were provided by Dynamo owners Anschutz Entertainment Group, Brenner Sports & Entertainment and Golden Boy Sports & Entertainment.

=== Endorsements ===
On March 8, 2012, BBVA Compass announced Ching as their social-media ambassador to promote causes important to Ching, his team and the bank. Among other things like charity work and appearances, Ching uses Facebook and Twitter to encourage his followers to contribute to "Building a Better Houston", BBVA Compass' community-service initiative with the Dynamo.

PLEX is the performance center of Ching and other athletes like fellow Dynamo alumni Stuart Holden, NFL quarterback and Katy product Andy Dalton, and NFL defensive end Julius Peppers.

PUMA was the official match boots provider for Ching. As one of PUMA's sponsored Major League Soccer players, Ching kicked off Breast Cancer Awareness Month 2011 in limited-edition Project Pink v1.11 boots, showing support for his female counterparts during the Dynamo's home game on October 1 versus the Chicago Fire.

=== Television ===
Ching hosted his own sports segment on KHOU, "Kickin' It with Brian Ching", on which he offered up advice on everything soccer from becoming a professional soccer player to befriending the StairMaster."

== See also ==
- Franchise player
- All-time Houston Dynamo roster

Sporting positions
Preceded by Wade Barrett	Houston Dynamo captain 2010–2012	Succeeded by Brad Davis
