= MLS Comeback Player of the Year Award =

Soccer award

MLS Comeback Player of the Year is a Major League Soccer award established in 2000. The award is voted on by media, MLS players and club management. It is presented to a player who showed impressive improvement after overcoming a serious injury or medical condition or after a previous slump in their career.

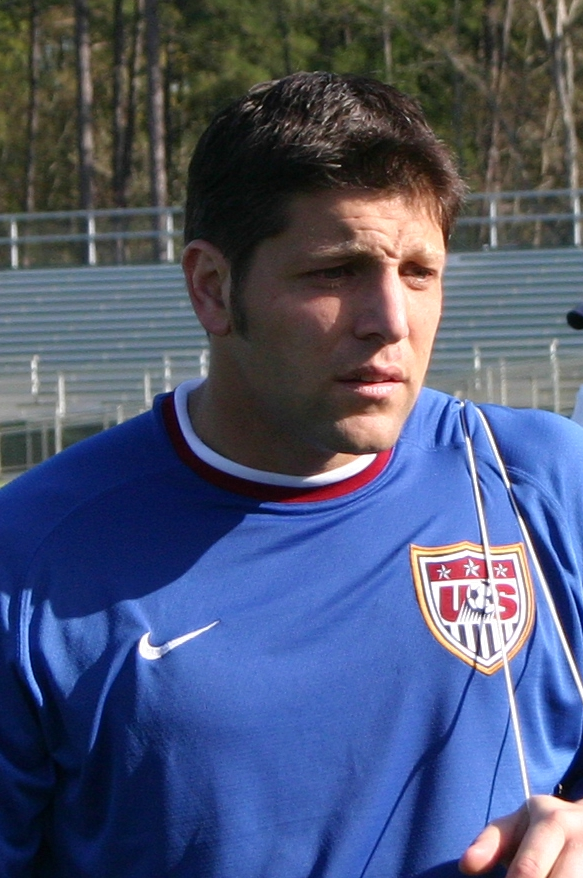
Kansas City Wizards' Tony Meola won the inaugural award in 2000

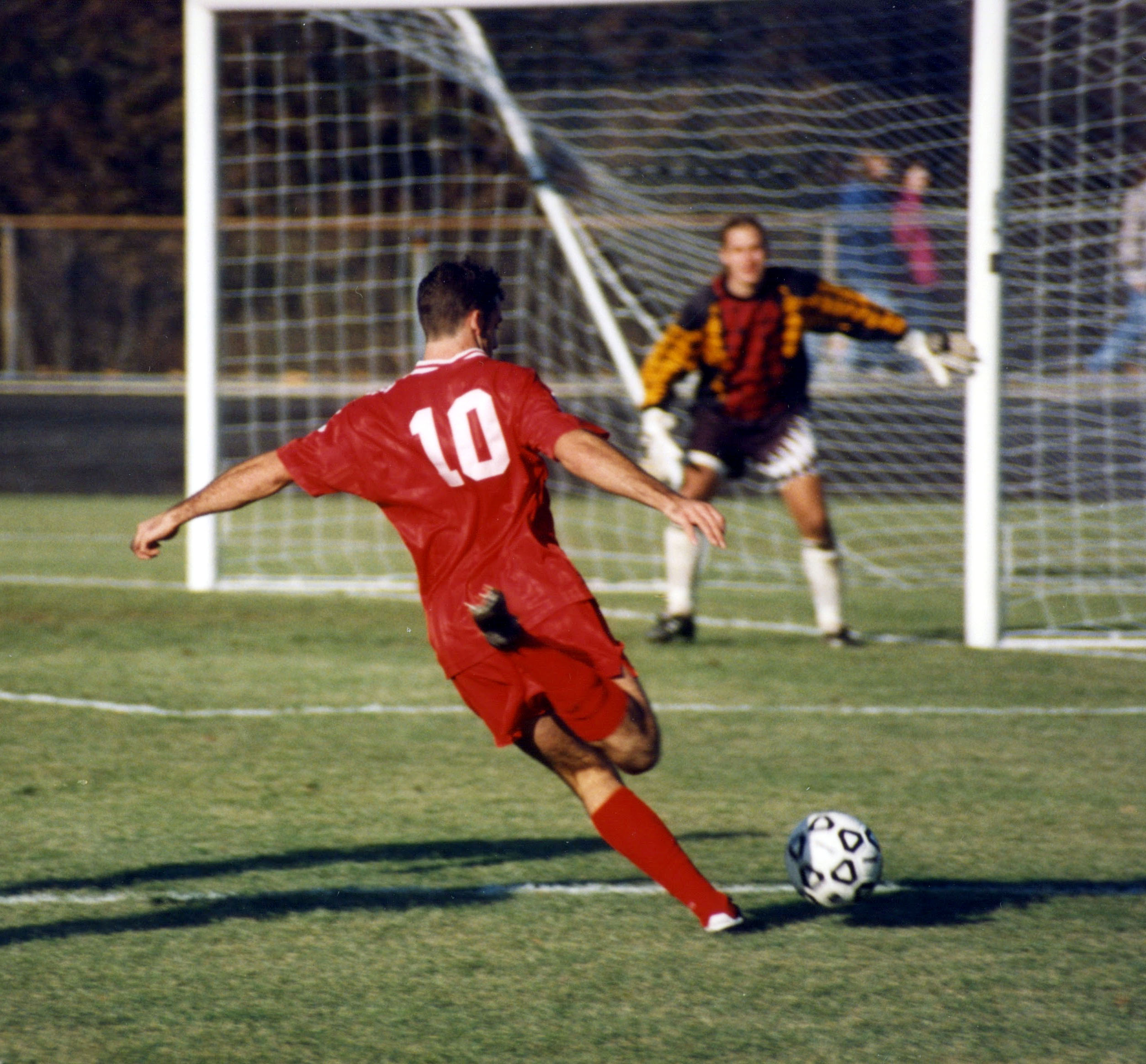
In 2005, Kansas City Wizards' Chris Klein (red) became the first player to win the award multiple times

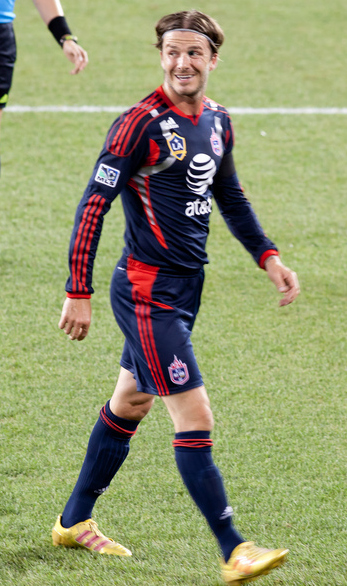
In 2011, LA Galaxy's David Beckham became the first non-American player to win the award

== Winners ==
Season	Player	Team
2000	(United States) Tony Meola	Kansas City Wizards
2001	(United States) Troy Dayak	San Jose Earthquakes
2002	(United States) Chris Klein	Kansas City Wizards
2003	(United States) Chris Armas	Chicago Fire
2004	(United States) Brian Ching	San Jose Earthquakes
2005	(United States) Chris Klein (2)	Kansas City Wizards
2006	(United States) Richard Mulrooney	FC Dallas
2007	(United States) Eddie Johnson	Kansas City Wizards
2008	(United States) Kenny Cooper	FC Dallas
2009	(United States) Zach Thornton	Chivas USA
2010	(United States) Bobby Convey	San Jose Earthquakes
2011	(England) David Beckham	Los Angeles Galaxy
2012	(United States) Eddie Johnson (2)	Seattle Sounders FC
2013	(United States) Kevin Alston	New England Revolution
2014	(Costa Rica) Rodney Wallace	Portland Timbers
2015	(United States) Tim Melia	Sporting Kansas City
2016	(United States) Chris Pontius	Philadelphia Union
2017	(United States) Clint Dempsey	Seattle Sounders FC
2018	(United States) Gyasi Zardes	Columbus Crew
2019	(United States) Jordan Morris	Seattle Sounders FC
2020	(England) Bradley Wright-Phillips	Los Angeles FC
2021	(Spain) Carles Gil	New England Revolution
2022	(Argentina) Gonzalo Higuaín	Inter Miami CF
2023	(Mexico) Alan Pulido	Sporting Kansas City
2024	(Scotland) Lewis Morgan	New York Red Bulls
2025	(United States) Nick Hagglund	FC Cincinnati
