= Damani Ralph =

Jamaican footballer (born 1980)

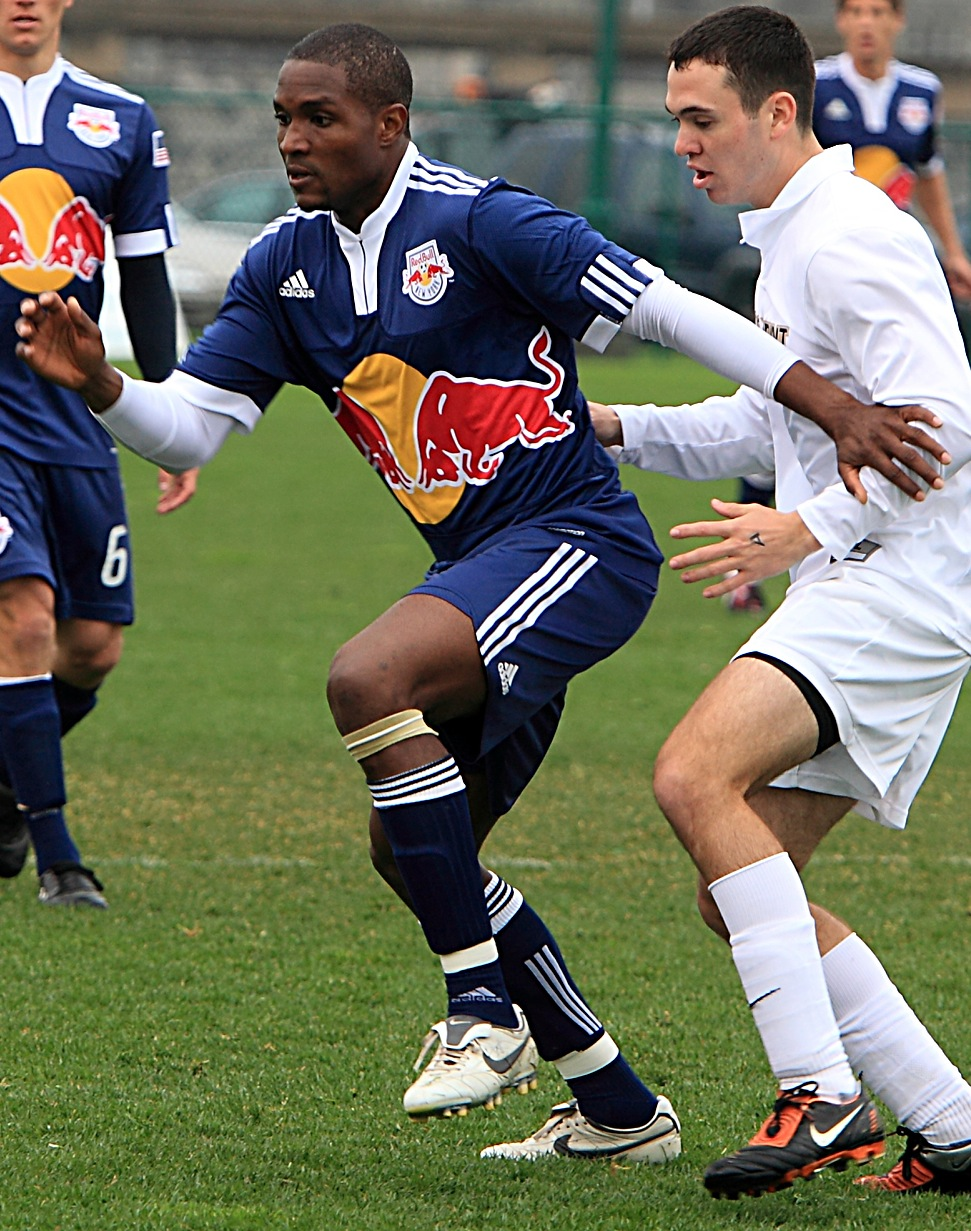
- Ralph as a trialist with New York Red Bulls.

Personal information
- Full name: Damani Ralph
- Date of birth: 6 November 1980 (age 45)
- Place of birth: Kingston, Jamaica
- Height: 1.84 m (6 ft 1/2 in)
- Position: Forward

Youth career
- 1998: Harbour View F.C.
- 1999–2000: Meridian Community College
- 2001–2002: University of Connecticut

Senior career*
Years	Team	Apps	(Gls)
2003–2004	Chicago Fire	51	(22)
2005–2007	Rubin Kazan	26	(2)
Total		77	(24)

International career
2002–2005	Jamaica	18	(1)
- * Club domestic league appearances and goals

Damani Ralph (born 6 November 1980) is a Jamaican retired footballer who played as a forward. His professional career spanned five years, two with Chicago Fire S.C. (2003–2004) and three with FC Rubin Kazan (2005–2007). He also earned 18 caps with the Jamaica national football team from 2002 to 2005. He has been a Licensed FIFA player agent with ICM Stellar Sports since 2011 and is currently its vice president of soccer in North America.

== Early life and amateur career ==
Ralph began playing football as a boy in Jamaica. This included time with Harbour View and St. George's College before moving to the United States. Ralph began his career in America playing college soccer at Meridian Community College in Meridian, Mississippi, where he scored 59 goals in 45 games and was named MVP of the NJCAA Tournament. After two years with Meridian, Ralph left for the University of Connecticut, where he continued his dominant play. During his two years at Connecticut he scored 28 goals and added 11 assists, and was a Hermann Trophy finalist his senior year.

In 2022, Ralph was inducted into the Mississippi Community College Sports Hall of Fame.

== Professional career ==
=== Chicago Fire ===
Ralph was drafted 18th overall by the Chicago Fire in the 2003 MLS SuperDraft. He quickly earned a spot in the starting lineup, and finished the season with 11 goals and 6 assists in 25 games. In scoring 11 goals, Ralph broke the MLS record for goals scored by a rookie, previously held by Rodrigo Faria, Josh Wolff, and Jeff Cunningham, and was named MLS Rookie of the Year for his accomplishments. In his second year with the Fire, he scored 11 goals again and added 3 assists to lead the team in scoring. Ralph scored the game-winning goal in the 2003 Lamar Hunt U.S. Open Cup final to win the Fire their third U.S. Open Cup.

=== Rubin Kazan ===
==== 2004 ====
Ralph's contributions to the Fire quickly caught the attention of European teams. In 2004, following his rookie season, there were strong rumors that Ralph would move to Malaga, but the deal collapsed at the final moment. In 2005, Ralph finally secured a transfer to Europe to FC Rubin Kazan for a reported €1.5 million. The contract would run for three years with a starting yearly salary of $650,000.

In his first season for Rubin, he scored only twice in 25 league games as the team gained a fourth-place finish.

==== Knee injury troubles (2005–2007) ====
In February 2006, before the new Russian season started, Ralph had surgery in Germany to repair damage to his left knee. He would have another surgery later that year. He played his final professional game as a substitute in a 2–1 loss to Zenit St. Petersburg on 20 May, 2007. He was sidelined for over 2.5 years after undergoing a third consecutive knee operation at the start of 2008.

=== Attempted return to MLS ===
After almost three years out of professional football due to injury, during which he finished his economics degree at the University of Connecticut, Ralph reappeared on a trial with Major League Soccer club New York Red Bulls during their 2010 pre-season. The trial ended without a contract offer from the club.

== International career ==
Ralph struggled to cement a starting place on the Jamaica national team, largely because of competition from a number of naturalized Jamaican forwards from England. He made his debut in an August 2002 friendly match against Grenada and earned 18 caps, scoring once. He played in 8 FIFA World Cup qualification matches.

His final international was an October 2005 friendly against Australia.

== Career statistics ==
=== Club ===
As of match played 20 May 2007

Appearances and goals by club, season and competition
Club	Season	League			National Cup		Continental		Other		Total	
Club	Season	Division	Apps	Goals	Apps	Goals	Apps	Goals	Apps	Goals	Apps	Goals
Chicago Fire	2003	Major League Soccer	25	11	3	2	-		4	1	32	14
Chicago Fire	2004	Major League Soccer	26	11	4	2			-		30	13
Chicago Fire	Total		51	22	7	4			4	1	62	27
Rubin Kazan	2005	Russian Premier League	25	2	0	0	-				25	2
Rubin Kazan	2006	Russian Premier League	0	0	0	0	0	0	-		0	0
Rubin Kazan	2007	Russian Premier League	1	0	0	0	0	0	-		1	0
Rubin Kazan	Total		26	2	0	0	0	0	-	-	26	2
Career total			77	24	7	4			4	1	88	29

== Honors ==
=== Club ===
Chicago Fire

- Supporters' Shield: 2003
- Lamar Hunt U.S. Open Cup: 2003

Rubin Kazan

- La Manga Cup (2): 2005, 2006

=== Individual ===
- MLS Rookie of the Year: 2003
- MLS Goal of the Year Award: 2003
