= Dave Sarachan =

American soccer player and coach

Personal information
- Date of birth: June 7, 1954 (age 72)
- Place of birth: Rochester, New York, U.S.
- Height: 5 ft 5 in (1.65 m)
- Position: Forward

College career
Years	Team	Apps	(Gls)
1973–1974	Monroe Tribunes		
1975–1976	Cornell Big Red		

Senior career*
Years	Team	Apps	(Gls)
1976–1977	Rochester Lancers	3	(0)
1977	Buffalo Blazers	10	(0)
1978–1979	Pittsburgh Spirit (indoor)	23	(23)
1980–1981	Buffalo Stallions (indoor)	46	(20)
1981	Baltimore Blast (indoor)	8	(0)
1982	Kansas City Comets (indoor)	12	(3)
Total		102	(46)

Managerial career
- 1976–1977: Rochester Yellowjackets (assistant)
- 1983: Cornell Big Red (assistant)
- 1984–1987: Virginia Cavaliers (assistant)
- 1988–1997: Cornell Big Red
- 1997–1999: D.C. United (assistant)
- 1999–2002: United States (assistant)
- 2002–2007: Chicago Fire
- 2008–2016: LA Galaxy (assistant)
- 2017: United States (assistant)
- 2017–2018: United States (interim)
- 2018–2020: North Carolina FC
- 2021–2022: Puerto Rico
- 2021–2022: Puerto Rico U20
- 2023–2024: Maccabi Tel Aviv (assistant)
- 2025–: San Jose Earthquakes (assistant)
- * Club domestic league appearances and goals as of 14:16, July 13, 2007 (UTC) ‡ National team caps and goals as of June 21, 2006

Dave Sarachan (born June 7, 1954) is an American former soccer player and coach. Sarachan spent two seasons as a player in the North American Soccer League and four in Major Indoor Soccer League before retiring in 1982. Since then, he has coached at the collegiate, professional, and national team levels. He served as head coach with Chicago Fire of Major League Soccer from 2002 to 2007 and as interim head coach of the United States men's national soccer team from 2017 to 2018.

== Playing career ==
=== High school and college ===
Sarachan grew up in Rochester, New York, graduating from Brighton High School in 1972. He then played two years of college soccer at Monroe Community College, where he was a junior college All-American in 1973 and 1974. After the 1974 season, he transferred to Cornell University, where he played two more years, and was named the team MVP as a senior.

=== NASL ===
Following his graduation, the Rochester Lancers of the North American Soccer League (NASL) drafted Sarachan. He played two seasons, 1976 and 1977, with the Lancers. For the remainder of the 1977 season, he played in Canada's National Soccer League with the Buffalo Blazers and made ten appearances.

=== MISL ===
After two seasons with the Lancers, Sarachan moved indoors, where he played for the Pittsburgh Spirit, Buffalo Stallions, Baltimore Blast, and Kansas City Comets.

== Coaching ==
=== Early coaching ===
While playing for the Lancers, Sarachan was an assistant coach at nearby University of Rochester. After his playing career ended, he was an assistant coach at Cornell for one season in 1983. Sarachan then joined Bruce Arena for the first time, becoming his assistant coach at the University of Virginia after Bob Bradley departed to become head coach at Princeton University.

=== Cornell ===
After five years at UVA, Sarachan was offered the head coaching job at his alma mater Cornell, which he accepted in 1988. He stayed at Cornell for ten years, compiling a record of 64 wins, 63 losses, and 16 ties, and leading the team to NCAA tournament appearances in 1995 and 1996.

=== D.C. United ===
On December 17, 1997, Arena hired Sarachan as his assistant with D.C. United following Bob Bradley's departure from the team to become the head coach of Chicago Fire. Although Arena would leave following the 1998 season to coach the United States national team, Sarachan stayed on, assisting new head coach Thomas Rongen.

=== United States ===
Following the MLS Cup-winning 1999 season, Sarachan left to become a full-time assistant to Arena with the national team. He remained with the national team through the 2002 World Cup.

=== Chicago Fire ===
Sarachan received his first professional head coaching opportunity soon after the United States' impressive World Cup run when, after the 2002 season, Bob Bradley left Chicago for his hometown MetroStars. Sarachan was chosen for the Fire position, being named the second coach in Fire history on November 4, 2002. He and the club had a tremendous first season together, leading the Fire to the MLS Supporters' Shield with a 15–7–8 record, as well as a U.S. Open Cup victory, and an appearance in the MLS Cup, where they lost to the San Jose Earthquakes. For his performance as a rookie, Sarachan was named the MLS Coach of the Year.

Sarachan's second year was significantly harder, however, as star defender Carlos Bocanegra left MLS for Fulham before the season began, and the club lost national teamer DaMarcus Beasley to PSV Eindhoven in midseason; numerous other injuries plagued the team, and the Fire ended the season tied for the league's worst record at 8–13–9. The Fire's appearance in MLS Cup 2003 led to an invite to the 2004 CONCACAF Champions Cup, during which Chicago registered a combined 2–2–0 record against San Juan Jabloteh of Trinidad and Tobago (quarterfinals) and Costa Rican powerhouse Deportivo Saprissa (semifinals). The club also advanced to the 2004 U.S. Open Cup Final but were unable to defend their crown, losing to the Kansas City Wizards.

The Fire finished at 15–13–4 in 2005. In Sarachan's fourth season, the Chicago Fire took home their fourth Lamar Hunt U.S. Open Cup championship. On June 20, 2007, Sarachan was fired as head coach by Fire GM John Guppy. Sarachan finished with a 55–50–31 league record with the Fire and 75–57–33 across all competitions.

=== Los Angeles Galaxy ===
Sarachan was hired by the Los Angeles Galaxy in 2008 to once again assist Bruce Arena. The two of them led the Galaxy in the second half of the 2008 season when there was really no chance of the team making the playoffs. In 2009, the club brought in 16 new players, and the Galaxy cut their goals against deficit almost in half and was in first place for much of the season. They led the Galaxy to MLS Cup 2009 where they lost to Real Salt Lake on penalty kicks. Sarachan would remain with the Galaxy through 2016, during which they won MLS Cups in 2011, 2012, and 2014.

=== Return to United States ===
In 2017, Sarachan returned to his previous position of being the U.S. Men's National Team assistant coach. He once again was assisting head coach Bruce Arena, who was in his second stint as head coach for the national team. The U.S. Men's National Team failed to qualify for the 2018 World Cup, and Arena subsequently resigned as the head coach. Sarachan was then named as the acting Men's National Team coach for their friendly match versus Portugal on November 14, 2017. Sarachan remained interim head coach of the USMNT until November 20, 2018. Because of the team's failure to qualify for the World Cup, Sarachan's stint as interim head coach did not involve any tournaments or qualification matches and only friendlies. On December 2, 2018, it was announced that Gregg Berhalter had been selected as the new coach of the USMNT.

=== North Carolina FC ===
On December 17, 2018, USL Championship side North Carolina FC announced Sarachan as their new head coach. Sarachan left the team on January 14, 2021, shortly after NCFC announced it would move to USL League One.

=== Puerto Rico ===
On February 24, 2021, it was announced that Dave Sarachan would become the head coach of the Puerto Rico national team for the upcoming 2022 FIFA World Cup qualification.

== Personal life ==
Sarachan is married to his wife Cherie and lives in Southern California with his two children, Ian and Alexa.

== Awards and honors ==
=== Club ===
Chicago Fire

- MLS Supporters' Shield: 2003
- Lamar Hunt U.S. Open Cup: 2003, 2006

On December 27, 2014, the Rochester Lancers of the Major Arena Soccer League inducted Sarachan into the Rochester Lancers Wall of Fame as one of Rochester's "soccer pioneers". Sarachan played for the original Rochester Lancers of the North American Soccer League.
