= Jamil Walker =

American soccer player (born 1981)

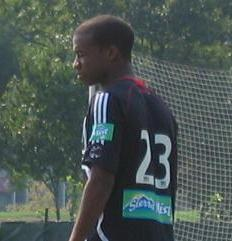

Personal information
- Date of birth: April 21, 1981 (age 45)
- Place of birth: Rochester, New York, United States
- Height: 5 ft 11 in (1.80 m)
- Positions: Forward; midfielder

Youth career
- 1999: Air Force Falcons
- 2000–2002: Santa Clara Broncos

Senior career*
Years	Team	Apps	(Gls)
2003–2004	San Jose Earthquakes	29	(4)
2005–2007	D.C. United	41	(3)
2008	Carolina RailHawks	6	(1)
2008	Portland Timbers	12	(0)
- * Club domestic league appearances and goals

Jamil Walker (born April 21, 1981, in Rochester, New York) is a retired American soccer forward and midfielder, who played professionally in Major League Soccer and the USL First Division.

== College ==
In 1999, Walker spent his freshman season at the United States Air Force Academy where he was a member of the men's soccer team. He played in ten of the Falcons' nineteen games, scoring three goals and adding one assist. He transferred to Santa Clara University after his freshman year and went on to play three seasons with the Broncos. During his senior season at Santa Clara, Walker scored fourteen goals and was named to the NSCAA/adidas All-Far West Team, the All-West Region Team and the All-West Coast Conference First Team.

== Professional ==
In February 2003, the San Jose Earthquakes selected Walker in the fourth round (thirty-ninth overall) of the 2003 MLS SuperDraft. Used as a substitute during the season, Walker gained three starts during the playoffs including the championship game. The Earthquakes went on to win the 2003 MLS Cup. In 2004, injuries limited him to ten games. On November 19, 2004, Chivas USA selected Walker with the fifteenth selection of the 2004 MLS Expansion Draft. Chivas then traded him to D.C. United in exchange for United's second round pick in the 2007 MLS Supplemental Draft. During the 2005 season, Walker played for both the D.C. United first and reserve teams. He led the reserve division in scoring with nine goals. In May 2007, he ruptured his achilles tendon during a reserve team game. D.C. United released him at the end of the season. Walker signed with the Carolina RailHawks of the USL First Division for the 2008 season. He played his first game with the RailHawks in a 1–1 tie with the Atlanta Silverbacks on April 19, 2008. On July 9, 2008, the RailHawks traded Walker to the Rochester Rhinos in exchange for Hamed Diallo. The Rhinos then immediately traded Walker and Chase Harrison to the Portland Timbers for Andrew Gregor.

== Honors ==
- 2003 MLS Cup
- Major League Soccer Supporters' Shield (1): 2006
- 2014 NSCAA Youth/Club Boys Coach of the Year
