= Rodrigo Faria =

Brazilian footballer

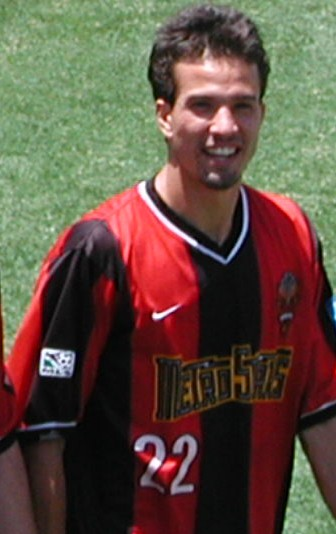

Personal information
- Full name: Rodrigo Faria
- Date of birth: February 24, 1977 (age 49)
- Place of birth: Rio de Janeiro, Brazil
- Height: 6 ft 1 in (1.85 m)
- Position: Forward

Youth career
- 1999: Concordia College (New York)

Senior career*
Years	Team	Apps	(Gls)
2001–2002	MetroStars	49	(20)
2003	Chicago Fire	5	(0)
2003	San Jose Earthquakes	4	(0)
- * Club domestic league appearances and goals

Rodrigo Faria (born 24 February 1977, in Rio de Janeiro) is a former Brazilian footballer who played as a striker.

== Early career ==
Faria began his youth career in Brazil with the Flamengo and Vasco da Gama systems. He later came to the United States to attend Concordia College in 1999, where he scored 24 goals in 19 games. During college, he also played for the Westchester Flames in the Premier Development League. He was scouted by the MetroStars and subsequently drafted 13th overall in the 2001 MLS SuperDraft.

== Professional career ==
In his first season with the MetroStars, Faria tied the then MLS rookie single-season record by scoring eight goals on the way to being named the MLS Rookie of the Year. In an expanded role in 2002, he upped his total to twelve goals and also tallied five assists to lead the club in scoring. The club acquired a new head coach Bob Bradley from the Chicago Fire the following season and Faria was shipped to Chicago as compensation.

Rodrigo split the 2003 MLS season between the Fire and the San Jose Earthquakes, without scoring a regular season goal. He scored the overtime game-winner for the Earthquakes in a dramatic comeback against the Los Angeles Galaxy in the MLS Cup semifinals. San Jose went on to win the Cup with Faria playing a minor role.

Shortly after the 2003 season, Faria returned to Brazil to tend to his family's business interests after the death of his father. Though he expressed interest in continuing his playing career, he retired from the game due to a lack of Brazilian clubs willing to pay the required fees to purchase his unfulfilled contract with MLS.

== Honors ==
=== Club ===
San Jose Earthquakes

- MLS Cup: 2003

=== Individual ===
- MLS Rookie of the Year: 2001
