= Chris Roner =

American soccer player

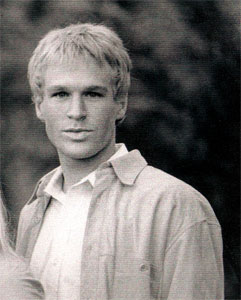

Personal information
- Date of birth: March 4, 1980 (age 46)
- Place of birth: San Francisco, California, U.S.
- Height: 6 ft 1 in (1.85 m)

Youth career
- 1998–2001: California Golden Bears

Senior career*
Years	Team	Apps	(Gls)
2002–2004	San Jose Earthquakes	27	(2)
- * Club domestic league appearances and goals

Chris Thor Roner (born March 4, 1980) is an American former soccer player. He played for the San Jose Earthquakes of Major League Soccer. His brother Erik Roner was a professional skier and base jumper who starred in the Nitro Circus series on MTV.

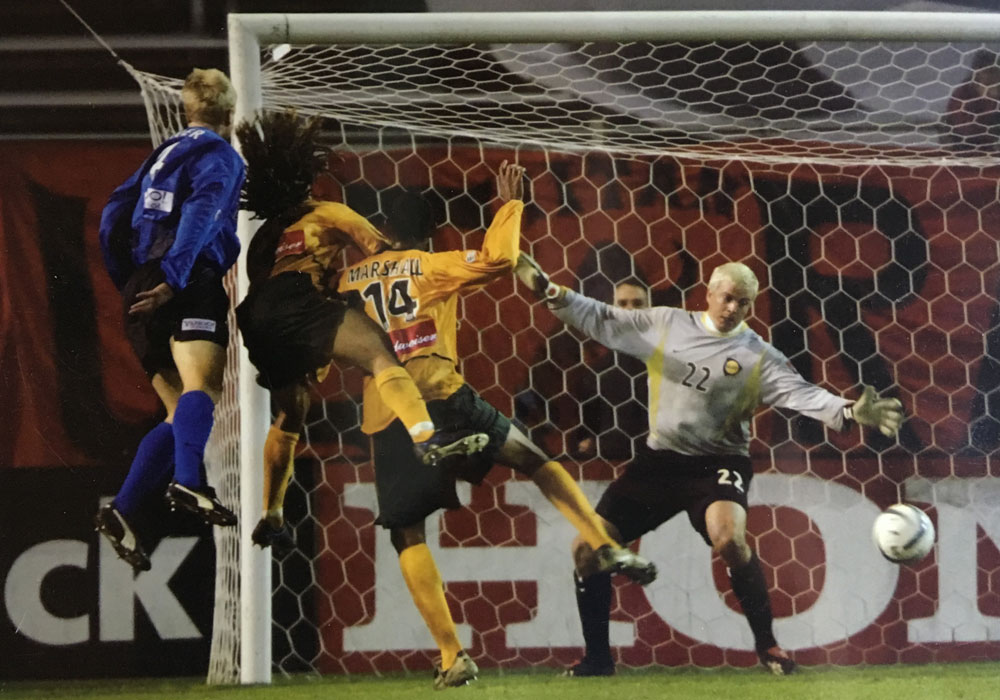
Roner scoring the tying goal in the Western Conference semifinals

Roner (pronounced "Ron-ear") played four years of college soccer at University of California, Berkeley where he was Team Captain, First Team Pac-10 and MVP his final three years. He was selected 33rd overall by the San Jose Earthquakes in the 2002 MLS SuperDraft. As a rookie, Roner saw limited playing time. The following year, in 2003, he was instrumental in helping the Quakes win the MLS Cup. In the Western Conference semifinals against the Los Angeles Galaxy, Roner scored the tying goal in the 90th minute, capping the "greatest comeback game" in MLS history.

At MLS Cup 2003, Roner was substituted early in the second half and scored the first own goal in MLS Cup history. Minutes later, he conceded the first penalty kick in MLS Cup history, but San Jose won the match 4–2 and clinched the championship.

After the 2003 championship, Roner underwent a routine arthroscopic surgery on his right ankle, but the cartilage damage was so severe that it ended his soccer career early. He attempted to revive his career in 2005, being called into the San Jose pre-season camp, but was unable to play through the pain. After retiring, Roner worked at an advertising firm in San Francisco.
