= Ronnie Ekelund =

Danish footballer (born 1972)

Personal information
- Full name: Ronnie Michael Ekelund
- Date of birth: 21 August 1972 (age 54)
- Place of birth: Glostrup, Denmark
- Height: 1.78 m (5 ft 10 in)
- Positions: Midfielder; striker

Senior career*
Years	Team	Apps	(Gls)
1988–1992	Brøndby	63	(13)
1992–1994	Barcelona B	66	(10)
1992–1994	Barcelona	1	(0)
1994–1995	→ Southampton (loan)	17	(5)
1995–1996	→ Manchester City (loan)	4	(0)
1996	→ Coventry City (loan)	0	(0)
1996	→ Lyngby (loan)	4	(0)
1996–1999	Odense Boldklub	44	(4)
1999–2000	Toulouse	?	(?)
2000–2001	Walsall	9	(1)
2001–2004	San Jose Earthquakes	91	(11)
2005–2006	California Cougars (indoor)	22	(11)
Total		258	(42)

International career
1987–1989	Denmark U17	23	(10)
1989–1991	Denmark U19	7	(0)
1990–1993	Denmark U21	21	(3)
- * Club domestic league appearances and goals

Ronnie Michael Ekelund (born 21 August 1972) is a Danish former professional footballer who played as both a midfielder and forward.

He notably played in La Liga for Barcelona and in the Premier League for Southampton and Manchester City. In his native land he played Brøndby IF where he won two Danish football championships and later had spells with Lyngby and Odense Boldklub. He would also play in Ligue 1 with Toulouse and in the English Football League with Walsall before finishing his career in the United States with Major League Soccer side San Jose Earthquakes. Ekelund played 21 matches and scored three goals for the Danish under-21 national team and represented Denmark at the 1992 Summer Olympics football tournament. He was named 1988 Danish under-17 Talent of the Year.

Following retirement, he briefly played indoor soccer for California Cougars before returning to San Jose Earthquakes for a period as their technical advisor.

== Playing career ==
=== Brondby ===
Ekelund started his professional career with Danish club Brøndby IF in 1988. He made his first team debut at the age of 15, becoming the youngest player ever to appear in the top-flight Danish 1st Division. Ekelund was a part of the 1990 and 1991 Danish championship winning Brøndby team. He played a total 63 games for Brøndby in all competitions.

=== Barcelona ===
His involvement in the 1992 Summer Olympics impressed defending Spanish La Liga champions FC Barcelona. He joined Danish-Spaniard Thomas Christiansen at FC Barcelona B, the second-string team of the club. Due to league restrictions on the number of foreigners in the playing line-up, Ekelund had a hard time displacing stars like Michael Laudrup, Hristo Stoichkov and Romário in the Barcelona attack. He played a single league match during the 1993–94 season, coming on the field as a substitute and playing 33 minutes, before leaving the club.

=== Southampton ===
Ekelund went to England, to FA Premier League club Southampton in 1994. In the 1994 pre-season, Southampton and Barcelona stayed at the same hotel during a training camp. Before leaving, Barcelona manager Johann Cruyff asked Southampton manager Alan Ball what he wanted as a parting gift. Ball replied "A left sided midfielder", and the next day Ekelund was ready to play for the "Saints". Ekelund was an instant hit at Southampton's The Dell stadium with his skills on the ball, forming a great understanding with English forward Matthew Le Tissier, who Ekelund later described as being on level with Ronald Koeman and Romário. Ekelund soon suffered a back injury, and which the Southampton medical team felt that this could only be cured by surgery. As Ekelund refused to "go under the knife", the disagreement put paid to any hopes of a permanent transfer deal.

Ekelund underwent brief loan deals with English clubs Manchester City and Coventry City, but injuries limited his playing time there. He was loaned out to Danish Superliga club Lyngby FC, playing four games for the club in May 1996.

=== Later career ===
Ekelund went back to Denmark on a permanent basis in 1996, when he moved to Odense BK. He played two Superliga seasons for Odense, before the club was relegated to the secondary Danish 1st Division. He played one season for Odense in the 1st Division before moving on in the summer 1999.

He moved to French club Toulouse FC in Ligue 2. Ekelund helped Toulouse win promotion for the top-flight Ligue 1 championship, but the manager was fired and Ekelund left the club. During a training session while on trial with English club Bolton Wanderers in the second-tier Football League First Division, Ekelund suffered an injury which forced him out of the game for three months. When he recovered, Ekelund signed with English team Walsall in the third-tier Football League Second Division in December 2000, to play under manager Ray Graydon who Ekelund knew as a coach from his time at Southampton. Ekelund played nine league games for Walsall, scoring once against Bournemouth. He was offered a new contract by Graydon, but decided to leave Europe in 2001.

In April 2001, Ekelund transferred to US club San Jose Earthquakes in Major League Soccer, who competed with Colorado Rapids for Ekelund's signature. Ekelund suffered a knee injury in his first season at Earthquakes, but recovered and soon became ever-present in the starting lineup. With great passing skill and leadership qualities, Ekelund helped the team win the 2001 MLS Cup in his first Earthquakes season. In the following season, Ekelund was named in the 2002 MLS Best XI selection. In 2003, he helped the Earthquakes win the MLS Cup once more, as he scored in the 4–2 win against Chicago Fire. In 2004, the Earthquakes management team changed, and Ekelund was deemed surplus to requirements. In four seasons with San Jose, Ekelund scored 11 goals (five of them penalty kicks) and made 16 assists in the regular season. He also scored a goal and made four assists in the playoffs.

He left the team after the 2004 MLS season, and made the move to indoor soccer in 2005 joining the California Cougars, coached by his good friend and former teammate Troy Dayak. During the 2005–06 season, Ekelund offered his experience to Southampton as a coaching staff member unsuccessfully. He joined the coaching staff of the Earthquakes in 2008 as Technical Advisor, helping with the day-to-day training of the team.

== International career ==
Ekelund made his name known when he debuted for the Danish under-17 national team in October 1987. He scored 10 goals in 23 games for the Denmark under-17s, and was named 1988 Danish under-17 Talent of the Year. He represented the under-17 national team at the 1989 European Under-17 Championship, and was called up for the Denmark under-21 national football team in June 1990.

He represented the Denmark under-21 team in the 1992 Summer Olympics hosted at Barcelona,

== Personal life ==
Ronnie Ekelund and his wife own and operate a small company called Bébé au Lait, with Ronnie holding the CEO position at the company. Bébé au Lait develops and markets fashionable nursing covers for breastfeeding mothers. According to Bébé au Lait's website, Ronnie's wife invented the Hooter Hiders nursing cover because she wanted to nurse her child discreetly, while attending Ronnie's football games. These nursing covers have been endorsed by Hollywood celebrities such as The View's Elisabeth Hasselbeck. and Mira Sorvino

== Honours ==
- 1988 Danish under-17 Talent of the Year
- Danish championship: 1990 and 1991
- MLS Cup: 2001 and 2003
- MLS Best XI: 2002
