= 2001 Los Angeles Galaxy season =

American soccer club season

LA Galaxy
2001 season
- Head coach: (Germany) Sigi Schmid
- Major League Soccer: 1st in Western Division
- U.S. Open Cup: Winners
- MLS Cup Playoffs: Runners-up
- FIFA Club World Championship: Cancelled
- Top goalscorer: Luis Hernández (8)
- Average home league attendance: 17,387
Home colors	Away colors

The 2001 Los Angeles Galaxy season was the club's sixth season of existence, and their sixth consecutive in Major League Soccer, the top division of the American soccer pyramid.

They finished first in the Western Division but lost to the San Jose Earthquakes in the final. The Galaxy won their first U.S. Open Cup title by defeating the New England Revolution in the final 2–1 after extra time. They were scheduled to compete in the FIFA Club World Championship but the tournament was ultimately cancelled.

== First-team squad ==
Squad at end of season

Note: Flags indicate national team as defined under FIFA eligibility rules; some limited exceptions apply. Players may hold more than one non-FIFA nationality.

No.	Pos.	Nation	Player
1	GK	USA	Matt Reis
3	DF	USA	Greg Vanney
6	DF	USA	Craig Waibel
7	FW	USA	Isaias Bardales Jr.
8	MF	USA	Peter Vagenas
9	FW	USA	Brian Ching
10	MF	SLV	Mauricio Cienfuegos
11	MF	USA	Sasha Victorine
12	MF	NZL	Simon Elliott
13	MF	USA	Cobi Jones

No.	Pos.	Nation	Player
15	FW	MEX	Luis Hernández
17	DF	VIN	Ezra Hendrickson
18	DF	USA	Adam Frye
19	MF	USA	Brian Mullan
20	MF	USA	Paul Caligiuri
22	GK	USA	Kevin Hartman
23	DF	USA	Danny Califf
25	MF	SLV	Marvin Quijano
30	DF	USA	Alexi Lalas

=== Left club during season ===
Note: Flags indicate national team as defined under FIFA eligibility rules; some limited exceptions apply. Players may hold more than one non-FIFA nationality.

No.	Pos.	Nation	Player
6	MF	USA	Danny Pena (to Tampa Bay Mutiny)

== Matches ==
=== MLS regular season ===
Pos	Team	Pld	W	L	T	GF	GA	GD	Pts	Qualification
1	Los Angeles Galaxy	26	14	7	5	52	36	+16	47	MLS Cup Playoffs
2	San Jose Earthquakes	26	13	7	6	47	29	+18	45	MLS Cup Playoffs
3	Kansas City Wizards	27	11	13	3	33	53	−20	36	MLS Cup Playoffs
4	Colorado Rapids	26	5	13	8	36	47	−11	23	

Source: MLS

April 6, 2001 1	Los Angeles Galaxy	2–3	San Jose Earthquakes	Pasadena, CA
10:00 pm PT	Vanney (yellow card) 35'; Victorine 80'; Frye 83'	Report	Dayak 9'; Cerritos 24'; De Rosario 27'	Stadium: Rose Bowl; Attendance: 17,386; Referee: Gerry Corrie

April 14, 2001 2	Kansas City Wizards	2–1	Los Angeles Galaxy	Kansas City, MO
5:34 pm PT	C. Brown 3'; McKeon (yellow card) 15'; Klein 53'	Report	Lalas (yellow card) 9'; Vanney 80'	Stadium: Arrowhead Stadium; Attendance: 13,042; Referee: Alex Prus

April 20, 2001 3	Los Angeles Galaxy	1–0	Colorado Rapids	Pasadena, CA
10:00 pm PT	Hendrickson 44'	Report	Paule (yellow card) 45'	Stadium: Rose Bowl; Attendance: 12,749; Referee: Reggie Rutty

April 28, 2001 4	Colorado Rapids	2–3	Los Angeles Galaxy	Denver, CO
3:00 pm PT	Agogo 44'; Herdsman (yellow card) 79'; Spencer 86'	Report	Jones 22', 45+2'; Califf (yellow card) 36'; Elliott (yellow card) 39'; Cienfuegos (yellow card) 44'; Vanney (yellow card) 56'; Victorine 69'	Stadium: Mile High Stadium; Attendance: 8,309; Referee: Richard Grady
Note: The goal scored by Cobi Jones at the 22nd minute is the 300th goal in the franchise's history.

May 4, 2001 5	Los Angeles Galaxy	2–1	Kansas City Wizards	Pasadena, CA
10:00 pm PT	Hendrickson (yellow card) 17'; Vanney 32' (pen.); Califf 90'	Report	McKeon 18' (pen.); Zavagnin (yellow card) 43'; Meola (yellow card) 90'; Prideaux (yellow card) 90'	Stadium: Rose Bowl; Attendance: 13,471; Referee: Kevin Terry

May 9, 2001 6	Tampa Bay Mutiny	4–4 (a.e.t.)	Los Angeles Galaxy	Tampa, FL
4:00 pm PT	Diallo 15', 16', 37', 78'; Quill (yellow card) 35'; Valderrama (yellow card) 90'	Report	Mullan 1', 90'; Victorine 3'; Vanney 62' (pen.); Califf (yellow card) 77'	Stadium: Raymond James Stadium; Attendance: 6,056; Referee: Alex Prus

May 12, 2001 7	NY/NJ MetroStars	2–0	Los Angeles Galaxy	East Rutherford, NJ
4:37 pm PT	Mathis (yellow card) 38' (goal) 77'; Villegas 53' (red card) 84'; Álvarez (yellow card) 65'; Perez (yellow card) 69'	Report	Caligiuri (yellow card) 36'; Pena (yellow card) 39'; Califf (yellow card) 69'	Stadium: Giants Stadium; Attendance: 21,561; Referee: Paul Tamberino

May 18, 2001 8	Los Angeles Galaxy	0–0 (a.e.t.)	Dallas Burn	Pasadena, CA
10:00 pm PT	Hernández (yellow card) 45'	Report	Suarez (yellow card) 35'; Broome (yellow card) 43'; Rodríguez (yellow card) 81'	Stadium: Rose Bowl; Attendance: 15,881; Referee: Roger Sill

May 25, 2001 9	Los Angeles Galaxy	2–0	New England Revolution	Pasadena, CA
10:00 pm PT	Hernández (yellow card) 53'; Frye (yellow card) 70'; Hendrickson 77'; Califf (yellow card) 83'; Jones 88'	Report	Franchino (yellow card) 53'	Stadium: Rose Bowl; Attendance: 12,249; Referee: Gerry Corrie

May 30, 2001 10	Chicago Fire	3–4	Los Angeles Galaxy	Chicago, IL
6:30 pm PT	Stoichkov 12' (pen.); Marsch 15'; C.J. Brown (yellow card) 56'; Gutiérrez (yellow card) 77'; Wynalda 75'	Report	Cienfuegos (yellow card) 10'; Hernández 19', 70' (yellow card) 74'; Vanney 22' (pen.); Vagenas 52'; Califf (yellow card) 71'	Stadium: Soldier Field; Attendance: 9,498; Referee: Kevin Terry

June 2, 2001 11	Columbus Crew	1–1 (a.e.t.)	Los Angeles Galaxy	Columbus, OH
1:00 pm PT	Lapper (yellow card) 45'; Pérez 49'	Report	Vanney (yellow card) 36'; Quijano 47'	Stadium: Columbus Crew Stadium; Attendance: 15,174; Referee: Richard Heron

June 8, 2001 12	San Jose Earthquakes	3–1	Los Angeles Galaxy	San Jose, CA
10:30 pm PT	Donovan 31', 90'; Russell 55'	Report	Pena (yellow card) 66'; Victorine 68'; Vanney (yellow card) 90'	Stadium: Spartan Stadium; Attendance: 13,361; Referee: Paul Tamberino

June 12, 2001 13	Los Angeles Galaxy	4–0	Kansas City Wizards	Pasadena, CA
10:00 pm PT	Quijano 17'; Jones 26'; Califf (yellow card) 63'; Ching 73'; Victorine 87'	Report	Garcia (yellow card) 52'; Gomez (red card) 56'	Stadium: Rose Bowl; Attendance: 4,827; Referee: Roger Sill

June 16, 2001 14	Miami Fusion	3–3 (a.e.t.)	Los Angeles Galaxy	Fort Lauderdale, FL
5:00 pm PT	Preki (yellow card) 16'; Serna 10', 80' (yellow card) 34'; Rooney 53'; McKinley (yellow card) 62'	Report	Lalas 28'; Bishop 35' (o.g.); Pena (yellow card) 37'; Cienfuegos 45'	Stadium: Lockhart Stadium; Attendance: 11,846; Referee: Alex Prus

June 23, 2001 15	Los Angeles Galaxy	2–0	NY/NJ MetroStars	Pasadena, CA
4:00 pm PT	Vagenas (yellow card) 16'; Pena (yellow card) 60'; Hernández 87', 88'	Report	Petke (yellow card) 49'	Stadium: Rose Bowl; Attendance: 13,844; Referee: Ricardo Valenzuela
Note: Los Angeles Galaxy reached the 100th win milestone, being the first MLS team in doing so.

June 30, 2001 16	Dallas Burn	0–0 (a.e.t.)	Los Angeles Galaxy	Dallas, TX
2:00 pm PT	Suarez (yellow card) 43'	Report	Elliott (yellow card) 15'; Califf (yellow card) 35'; Caligiuri (yellow card) 47'	Stadium: Cotton Bowl; Attendance: 16,104; Referee: Paul Tamberino

July 3, 2001 17	Los Angeles Galaxy	0–2	Columbus Crew	Pasadena, CA
10:00 pm PT	Hendrickson (yellow card) 20'; Vanney (yellow card) 48'; Hernández (yellow card) 84'	Report	Harkes (yellow card) 35'; West 67', 78'; Presthus (yellow card) 84'; Clark (yellow card) 87'	Stadium: Rose Bowl; Attendance: 52,634; Referee: Kevin Terry

July 7, 2001 18	D.C. United	0–3	Los Angeles Galaxy	Washington, D.C.
5:00 pm PT	Albright (yellow card) 53'; Ziadie (yellow card) 87'	Report	Caligiuri (yellow card) 37'; Hendrickson 46'; Jones (yellow card) 63' (goal) 84'; Hernández 83' (pen.)	Stadium: RFK Stadium; Attendance: 23,704; Referee: Noel Kenny

July 13, 2001 19	Los Angeles Galaxy	3–0	Miami Fusion	Pasadena, CA
10:00 pm PT	Hernández 8'; Frye 85'; Vanney (yellow card) 88' (goal) 90' (pen.)	Report	Bilyk (yellow card) 21'; Rimando (yellow card) 86'; Llamosa (yellow card) 88'; Alavanja (yellow card) 88'; Bishop (yellow card) 89'	Stadium: Rose Bowl; Attendance: 16,207; Referee: Alex Prus

July 17, 2001 20	New England Revolution	3–2	Los Angeles Galaxy	Foxborough, MA
4:30 pm PT	Harris 7'; Sunsing 32'; Williams 51'	Report	Hernández 28', 40' (yellow card) 42'; Califf (yellow card) 49'; Waibel (yellow card) 70'; Hendrickson (yellow card) 90'	Stadium: Foxboro Stadium; Attendance: 12,391; Referee: Gerry Corrie

August 10, 2001 21	Los Angeles Galaxy	1–0	D.C. United	Pasadena, CA
10:00 pm PT	Vanney (yellow card) 28'; Vagenas (yellow card) 48'; Hendrickson 72'	Report	Talley (yellow card) 33'; Namoff (yellow card) 63'	Stadium: Rose Bowl; Attendance: 13,805; Referee: Michael Kennedy

August 15, 2001 22	Kansas City Wizards	1–2 (a.e.t.)	Los Angeles Galaxy	Kansas City, MO
5:37 pm PT	Lowe 57'; Lassiter (yellow card) 76'; Garcia (yellow card) 82'	Report	Califf 12'; Cienfuegos (yellow card) 56'; Hendrickson (yellow card) 63' 96'; Hernández (yellow card) 80'	Stadium: Arrowhead Stadium; Attendance: 7,893; Referee: Peter Kokolski

August 17, 2001 23	Los Angeles Galaxy	5–1	Tampa Bay Mutiny	Pasadena, CA
11:00 pm PT	Vanney 18' (yellow card) 24'; Addo 21' (o.g.); Victorine 29', 81'; Quijano (yellow card) 44'; Jones 79'	Report	Ralston 4'; Keller (yellow card) 14'	Stadium: Rose Bowl; Attendance: 12,115; Referee: Kevin Stott

August 25, 2001 24	Los Angeles Galaxy	1–3	Chicago Fire	Pasadena, CA
4:00 pm PT	Hendrickson (yellow card) 68'; Vagenas 78'	Report	Razov 5'; Bocanegra (yellow card) 60'; Beasley 64', 90'; Brown (yellow card) 83'	Stadium: Rose Bowl; Attendance: 23,488; Referee: Terry Vaughn

August 31, 2001 25	Los Angeles Galaxy	3–2 (a.e.t.)	Colorado Rapids	Pasadena, CA
10:00 PT	Cienfuegos 11'; Elliott (yellow card) 64'; Califf 69'; Caligiuri (yellow card) 90'; Lalas 101'	Report	Bravo 28', 85'; Baba (yellow card) 29'; Shak (yellow card) 69'	Stadium: Rose Bowl; Attendance: 17,379; Referee: Noel Kenny

September 8, 2001 26	Colorado Rapids	0–2	Los Angeles Galaxy	Denver, CO
8:00 pm PT	Carrieri (yellow card) 38'; Martinez (yellow card) 53'; Shak (yellow card) 75'	Report	Elliott 20'; Califf (yellow card) 26'; Waibel (yellow card) 59'; Vagenas 90'	Stadium: Mile High Stadium; Attendance: 17,129; Referee: Erich Simmons

September 12, 2001 27	Los Angeles Galaxy	Cancelled	San Jose Earthquakes
Note: Matchweeks 27 and 28 were cancelled due to the September 11 attacks.

September 16, 2001 28	San Jose Earthquakes	Cancelled	Los Angeles Galaxy
Note: Matchweeks 27 and 28 were cancelled due to the September 11 attacks.

Source: MLS

=== MLS Cup Playoffs ===
Quarterfinals

September 22, 2001 1st Leg	Los Angeles Galaxy	1–1 (a.e.t.)	NY/NJ MetroStars	Pasadena, CA
	Caligiuri 63' (red card) 83'	Report	Hernández (yellow card) 7'; Faria 29'; Valencia (yellow card) 32'; Gilmar (red card) 65'; Jolley (yellow card) 90'; Perez (yellow card) 92'	Stadium: Rose Bowl; Attendance: 11,580; Referee: Terry Vaughn
Note: The series is tied 1–1 on points.

September 26, 2001 2nd Leg	NY/NJ MetroStars	4–1	Los Angeles Galaxy	East Rutherford, NJ
	Petke (yellow card) 50'; Faria 72', 80'; Chung 75'; Valencia 83'	Report	Victorine 4'; Vanney (red card) 48'	Stadium: Giants Stadium; Attendance: 12,817; Referee: Noel Kenny
Note: MetroStars lead the series 4–1 on points.

September 29, 2001 3rd Leg	Los Angeles Galaxy	3–2 (1–0) (a.e.t.)	NY/NJ MetroStars	Pasadena, CA
	Victorine 21', 33'; Cienfuegos (yellow card) 39'; Frye 56'; Califf (red card) 71' Cienfuegos 8'	Report	Villegas 49', 60'; Perez (yellow card) 55'	Stadium: Rose Bowl; Attendance: 6,154; Referee: Paul Tamberino
Note: The series ended in a tie 4–4 on points. Galaxy wins on Sudden Death Extra Time.

Semifinals

October 10, 2001 1st Leg	Chicago Fire	1–1 (a.e.t.)	Los Angeles Galaxy	Chicago, IL
	Wynalda 32'; Beasley (yellow card) 52'; Whitfield (red card) 60'	Report	Hernández 44' (yellow card) 45'; Frye (yellow card) 46'; Caligiuri (yellow card) 94'	Stadium: Soldier Field; Attendance: 10,388; Referee: Kevin Stott
Note: The series is tied 1–1 on points.

October 13, 2001 2nd Leg	Los Angeles Galaxy	1–0 (a.e.t.)	Chicago Fire	Fullerton, CA
	Jones (yellow card) 51'; Vagenas 94'	Report	Kovalenko (yellow card) 29'; Brown (yellow card) 36'; Marsch (yellow card) 83'	Stadium: Titan Stadium; Attendance: 10,100; Referee: Alex Prus
Note: Galaxy leads the series 4–1 on points.

October 17, 2001 3rd Leg	Chicago Fire	1–2 (a.e.t.)	Los Angeles Galaxy	Chicago, IL
	Beasley 30' (yellow card) 84'; Brown (yellow card) 46'; Stoichkov (yellow card) 84'; Bocanegra (yellow card) 97'	Report	Califf 44'; Hernández (yellow card) 46'; Vanney (yellow card) 65'; Cienfuegos 98'	Stadium: Soldier Field; Attendance: 13,444; Referee: Gerry Corrie
Note: Galaxy wins the series 7–1 on points.

MLS Cup

October 21, 2001 MLS Cup	San Jose Earthquakes	2–1 (a.e.t.)	Los Angeles Galaxy	Columbus, OH
	Conrad (yellow card) 28'; Donovan 43'; Ekelund (yellow card) 78'; Ibsen (yellow card) 83'; De Rosario 96'	Report	Hernández 21'; Caligiuri (yellow card) 48'; Califf (yellow card) 76'	Stadium: Columbus Crew Stadium; Attendance: 21,626; Referee: Kevin Stott

=== U.S. Open Cup ===
June 27, 2001 Second Round	Los Angeles Galaxy	5–0	Nashville Metros	Fullerton, CA
	Quijano 24'; Vagenas 38' (pen.); Victorine 56'; Elliott 86' (pen.), 90'	Report		Stadium: Titan Stadium; Attendance: 2,314; Referee: Brian Hall

July 11, 2001 Third Round	Los Angeles Galaxy	3–1	Seattle Sounders	Fullerton, CA
	Lalas (yellow card) 27' (goal) 63'; Frye (yellow card) 32'; Waibel 60'; Bardales Jr. 81'	Report	Kingsley (yellow card) 36'; Reeves 58'	Stadium: Titan Stadium; Attendance: 2,450; Referee: Kevin Stott

July 24, 2001 Quarterfinals	San Jose Earthquakes	1–1 (a.e.t.) (9–10 p)	Los Angeles Galaxy	San Francisco, CA
	Bower (yellow card) 10'; Robinson (yellow card) 17'; Corrales (yellow card) 42'; Agoos (yellow card) 78'; Agogo 81'; Russell (yellow card) 88'	Report	Waibel (yellow card) 21'; Elliott (yellow card) 41' (goal) 73'; Califf (yellow card) 60'	Stadium: Negoesco Stadium; Attendance: 1,881; Referee: Michael Kennedy
	Penalties
	Agoos (penalty scored); Lagos (penalty scored); Corrales (penalty scored); Cerritos (penalty scored); De Rosario (penalty scored); Agogo (penalty scored); Ibsen (penalty scored); Russell (penalty scored); Conrad (penalty scored); Barrett (penalty missed)		(penalty scored) Vanney; (penalty scored) Vagenas; (penalty scored) Elliott; (penalty scored) Cienfuegos; (penalty scored) Hendrickson; (penalty scored) Waibel; (penalty scored) Caligiuri; (penalty scored) Jones; (penalty scored) Bardales Jr. (penalty scored) Califf

August 22, 2001 Semifinals	Los Angeles Galaxy	1–0 (a.e.t.)	Chicago Fire	Fullerton, CA
	Califf (yellow card) 24'; Jones (yellow card) 25'; Quijano (yellow card) 29'; Vanney (yellow card) 73'; Elliott (yellow card) 92'; Lalas 94'	Report	Whitfield (yellow card) 22'; Marsch (yellow card) 44'; Razov (red card) 45'	Stadium: Titan Stadium; Attendance: 6,871; Referee: Ricardo Valenzuela

October 27, 2001 Final	Los Angeles Galaxy	2–1 (a.e.t.)	New England Revolution	Fullerton, CA
	Califf (yellow card) 17' 92'; Hendrickson 70'; Frye (yellow card) 89'	Report	Harris 30'; Heaps (red card) 88'	Stadium: Titan Stadium; Attendance: 4,195; Referee: Paul Tamberino

=== FIFA Club World Championship ===
As winners of the 2000 CONCACAF Champions' Cup, Los Angeles Galaxy was one of the 12 teams that were invited to the 2001 FIFA Club World Championship, which would be hosted in Spain from July 28 to August 12, 2001. However, the tournament was cancelled, primarily due to the collapse of ISL, which was marketing partner of FIFA at the time.

July 31, 2001 1	Hearts of Oak (Ghana)	Cancelled	(United States) Los Angeles Galaxy	Madrid, Spain
				Stadium: Santiago Bernabéu Stadium

August 3, 2001 2	Los Angeles Galaxy (United States)	Cancelled	(Spain) Real Madrid	Madrid, Spain
				Stadium: Santiago Bernabéu Stadium

August 6, 2001 3	Los Angeles Galaxy (United States)	Cancelled	(Japan) Júbilo Iwata	Madrid, Spain
				Stadium: Vicente Calderón Stadium
