= All-time LA Galaxy roster =

This list comprises all players who have participated in at least one league match for Los Angeles Galaxy since the team's first Major League Soccer season in 1996. Players who were on the roster but never played a first team game are not listed; players who appeared for the team in other competitions (US Open Cup, CONCACAF Champions League, etc.) but never actually made an MLS appearance are noted at the bottom of the page.

A "†" denotes players who only appeared in a single match.

== A ==
- (United States) Chris Albright
- (France) Romain Alessandrini
- (Mexico) Tony Alfaro
- (United States) Ely Allen
- (United States) Chris Aloisi
- (Mexico) Efraín Álvarez
- (Colombia) Juan Pablo Ángel
- (Mexico) Uriel Antuna
- (United States) Chris Armas
- (Mexico) Julián Araujo

== B ==
- (United States) Isaias Bardales, Jr.
- (United States) Chad Barrett
- (England) David Beckham
- (United States) Benjamin Benditson
- (United States) Alex Bengard
- (United States) Gregg Berhalter
- (Trinidad and Tobago) Chris Birchall
- (Ghana) Emmanuel Boateng
- (England) Jonathan Bond
- (United States) Jose Botello
- (United States) Tristan Bowen
- (New Zealand) Andrew Boyens
- (United States) Paul Broome
- (United States) Edson Buddle
- (United States) Marc Burch

== C ==
- (United States) Dan Calichman
- (United States) Danny Califf
- (United States) Paul Caligiuri
- (Mexico) Jorge Campos
- (United States) Joe Cannon
- (Uruguay) Paolo Cardozo
- (United States) Mike Caso †
- (Brazil) Alex Cazumba
- (Costa Rica) Pablo Chinchilla
- (United States) Brian Ching
- (Zimbabwe) Mubarike Chisoni
- (El Salvador) Mauricio Cienfuegos
- (United States) Colin Clark
- (United States) Greg Cochrane
- (England) Ashley Cole
- (United States) Joe Corona
- (France) Laurent Courtois
- (United States) Adam Cristman
- (United States) Steve Cronin
- (Italy) Carlo Cudicini

== D ==
- (Guam) A. J. DeLaGarza
- (Senegal) Clément Diop
- (Argentina) Eduardo Domínguez
- (United States) Landon Donovan
- (Mexico) Jonathan dos Santos
- (Mexico) Giovani dos Santos
- (United States) Todd Dunivant

== E ==
- (United States) Gabe Eastman †
- (New Zealand) Simon Elliott
- (United States) Michael Enfield
- (United States) Alecko Eskandarian

== F ==
- (United States) Robbie Findley
- (United States) Joe Franchino
- (United States) Sean Franklin
- (United States) Robin Fraser
- (Canada) Rob Friend
- (United States) Adam Frye

== G ==
- (United States) Rafael Garcia
- (United States) Josh Gardner
- (United States) Dan Gargan
- (United States) John Garvey
- (United States) Bryan Gaul
- (United States) Michael Gavin
- (Puerto Rico) Bill Gaudette
- (United States) Seth George
- (England) Steven Gerrard
- (Trinidad and Tobago) Cornell Glen
- (Turks and Caicos Islands) Gavin Glinton
- (United States) Herculez Gomez
- (Costa Rica) Giancarlo González
- (United States) Guillermo Gonzalez
- (United States) Omar Gonzalez
- (United States) Alan Gordon
- (United States) Ned Grabavoy
- (United States) Kelly Gray
- (United States) Leonard Griffin †
- (Jamaica) Winston Griffiths

== H ==
- (United States) Ty Harden
- (Canada) Kevin Harmse
- (United States) Kevin Hartman
- (United States) Frankie Hejduk
- (Saint Vincent and the Grenadines) Ezra Hendrickson
- (Mexico) Carlos Hermosillo
- (United States) Daniel Hernández
- (Mexico) Javier Hernández
- (Mexico) Luis Hernández
- (Austria) Andreas Herzog
- (United States) Chandler Hoffman
- (South Korea) Hong Myung-bo
- (Ecuador) Eduardo Hurtado
- (Bosnia and Herzegovina) Baggio Husidić

== I ==
- (Sweden) Zlatan Ibrahimović
- (United States) Zak Ibsen
- (United States) Ugo Ihemelu
- (Sweden) Stefan Ishizaki

== J ==
- (United States) Bradford Jamieson IV
- (United States) Nate Jaqua
- (United States) Guillermo Jara
- (Canada) Ante Jazić
- (United States) Héctor Jiménez
- (United States) Steve Jolley
- (United States) Cobi Jones
- (United States) Jermaine Jones
- (United States) John Jones
- (Netherlands) Nigel de Jong
- (United States) Bryan Jordan
- (Brazil) Juninho

== K ==
- (Serbia) Aleksandar Katai
- (Armenia) Harut Karapetyan
- (Republic of Ireland) Robbie Keane
- (New Zealand) Dan Keat
- (United States) Brian Kelly
- (United States) Dan Kennedy
- (United States) Quavas Kirk
- (United States) Jovan Kirovski
- (United States) Chris Klein
- (United States) Sacha Kljestan
- (Ukraine) Dema Kovalenko
- (United States) David Kramer

== L ==
- (United States) Peter Lak
- (United States) Alexi Lalas
- (United States) Jeff Larentowicz
- (Costa Rica) Ariel Lassiter
- (Paraguay) Jerry Laterza
- (Brazil) Leonardo
- (United States) Eddie Lewis
- (United States) Ricky Lewis
- (United States) Sebastian Lletget
- (Brazil) David Lopes
- (Argentina) Miguel López
- (United States) Lawrence Lozzano

== M ==
- (Guatemala) Martín Machón
- (Spain) Ignacio Maganto
- (United States) Mike Magee
- (Jamaica) Tyrone Marshall
- (Trinidad and Tobago) Yohance Marshall
- (Mexico) Antonio Martínez
- (United States) Kyle Martino
- (United States) Pablo Mastroeni
- (United States) Clint Mathis
- (United States) Jack McBean
- (Guam) Brandon McDonald
- (Mexico) Raúl Mendiola
- (United States) Tommy Meyer
- (Brazil) Stefani Miglioranzi
- (Venezuela) Alejandro Moreno
- (Nigeria) Manny Motajo
- (United States) Brian Mullan
- (United States) Mike Munoz
- (Costa Rica) Roy Myers

== N ==
- (Brazil) Paulo Nagamura
- (United States) Kyle Nakazawa
- (Brazil) Naldo
- (Zimbabwe) Joseph Ngwenya
- (Iran) Arash Noamouz
- (United States) Pat Noonan

== O ==
- (Mexico) Jesús Ochoa
- (United States) Curt Onalfo
- (Ghana) Kofi Opare

== P ==
- (England) Kyle Patterson
- (Honduras) Carlos Pavón
- (Argentina) Cristian Pavon
- (United States) Danny Pena
- (Panama) Jaime Penedo
- (Mexico) Jonathan Pérez
- (United States) Brian Perk
- (Honduras) Alex Pineda Chacón
- (Brazil) Álvaro Pires
- (Spain) Riqui Puig
- (Uruguay) Diego Polenta
- (Serbia) Ivan Polic
- (United States) Dan Popik

== Q ==
- (United States) Santino Quaranta
- (United States) David Quesada †
- (El Salvador) Marvin Quijano

== R ==
- (Guatemala) Guillermo Ramírez
- (United States) Ruben Ramos Jr
- (United States) Mike Randolph
- (United States) Ante Razov
- (United States) Matt Reis
- (Mexico) José Retiz
- (Germany) Marco Reus
- (Jamaica) Donovan Ricketts
- (United States) James Riley
- (United States) Troy Roberts
- (United States) Dasan Robinson †
- (United States) Robbie Rogers
- (United States) David Romney
- (United States) Brian Rowe
- (United States) Charlie Rugg
- (Guatemala) Carlos Ruiz
- (United States) Ian Russell

== S ==
- (United States) Jorge Salcedo
- (Brazil) Samuel
- (Ecuador) Wellington Sánchez
- (United States) Tony Sanneh
- (Brazil) Marcelo Saragosa
- (Brazil) Marcelo Sarvas
- (Puerto Rico) Josh Saunders
- (United States) Mark Semioli
- (Colombia) Diego Serna
- (United States) Israel Sesay
- (United States) Andrew Shue
- (United States) Oscar Sorto
- (United States) Michael Stephens
- (United States) Daniel Steres
- (United States) Nathan Sturgis
- (United States) Ryan Suarez

== T ==
- (United States) Bryan Taylor
- (Brazil) Thiago
- (United States) Ryan Thomas †
- (Trinidad and Tobago) Sheldon Thomas †
- (United States) Scot Thompson †
- (United States) Arturo Torres
- (United States) Josh Tudela
- (United States) David Twigg

== U ==
- (Costa Rica) Michael Umaña

== V ==
- (United States) Peter Vagenas
- (United States) Julian Valentin
- (Belgium) Jelle Van Damme
- (United States) Greg Vanney
- (United States) Jose Vasquez
- (Finland) Mika Väyrynen
- (United States) Kyle Veris
- (United States) Sasha Victorine
- (United States) Jose Villarreal
- (Haiti) Sébastien Vorbe

== W ==
- (United States) Craig Waibel
- (United States) Kenney Walker
- (Brazil) Wélton
- (United States) Josh Wicks
- (Sweden) Christian Wilhelmsson
- (United States) Brad Wilson
- (United States) John Wolyniec

== X ==
- (Portugal) Abel Xavier

== Z ==
- (United States) Gyasi Zardes

== Sources ==
- "MLS All-Time MLS Player Register". Mlsnet.com. Major League Soccer. Archived from the original on 14 February 2009.
- "MLS Number Assignments Archive".
