= MLS Cup 2001 =

2001 edition of the MLS Cup

- Event: MLS Cup
San Jose Earthquakes	Los Angeles Galaxy
2	1
- After golden goal extra time
- Date: October 21, 2001
- Venue: Columbus Crew Stadium, Columbus, Ohio, US
- MLS Cup MVP: Dwayne De Rosario (San Jose Earthquakes)
- Referee: Kevin Stott
- Attendance: 21,626
- Weather: Partly cloudy, 68 °F (20 °C)

MLS Cup 2001 was the sixth edition of the MLS Cup, the championship match of Major League Soccer (MLS), which took place on October 21, 2001, at Columbus Crew Stadium in Columbus, Ohio. It was contested by the San Jose Earthquakes and the Los Angeles Galaxy, a pair of in-state rivals from California, to decide the champion of the 2001 season. San Jose won their first title, defeating Los Angeles 2–1 in overtime with a golden goal scored by Dwayne De Rosario in the 96th minute.

San Jose were appearing in their first MLS Cup, while Los Angeles had lost two previous finals; the two teams finished at the top of the Western Division in regular season play, which was cut short by the September 11 attacks. The Earthquakes, under their first season with manager Frank Yallop, won their quarterfinals series against the Columbus Crew over two legs and defeated the league-leading Miami Fusion after extra time in the third leg of the semifinals. The Galaxy defeated the MetroStars in the quarterfinals and Chicago Fire in the semifinals with a golden goal scored in extra time of the third leg for both series.

It was the first MLS Cup to match two teams from both the same conference and state against each other, and the second MLS Cup to end with a golden goal. Frank Yallop became the first former MLS player to coach a team to an MLS Cup title. Crew Stadium became the first soccer-specific stadium to host the MLS Cup, which had an attendance of 21,626 spectators.

== Venue ==
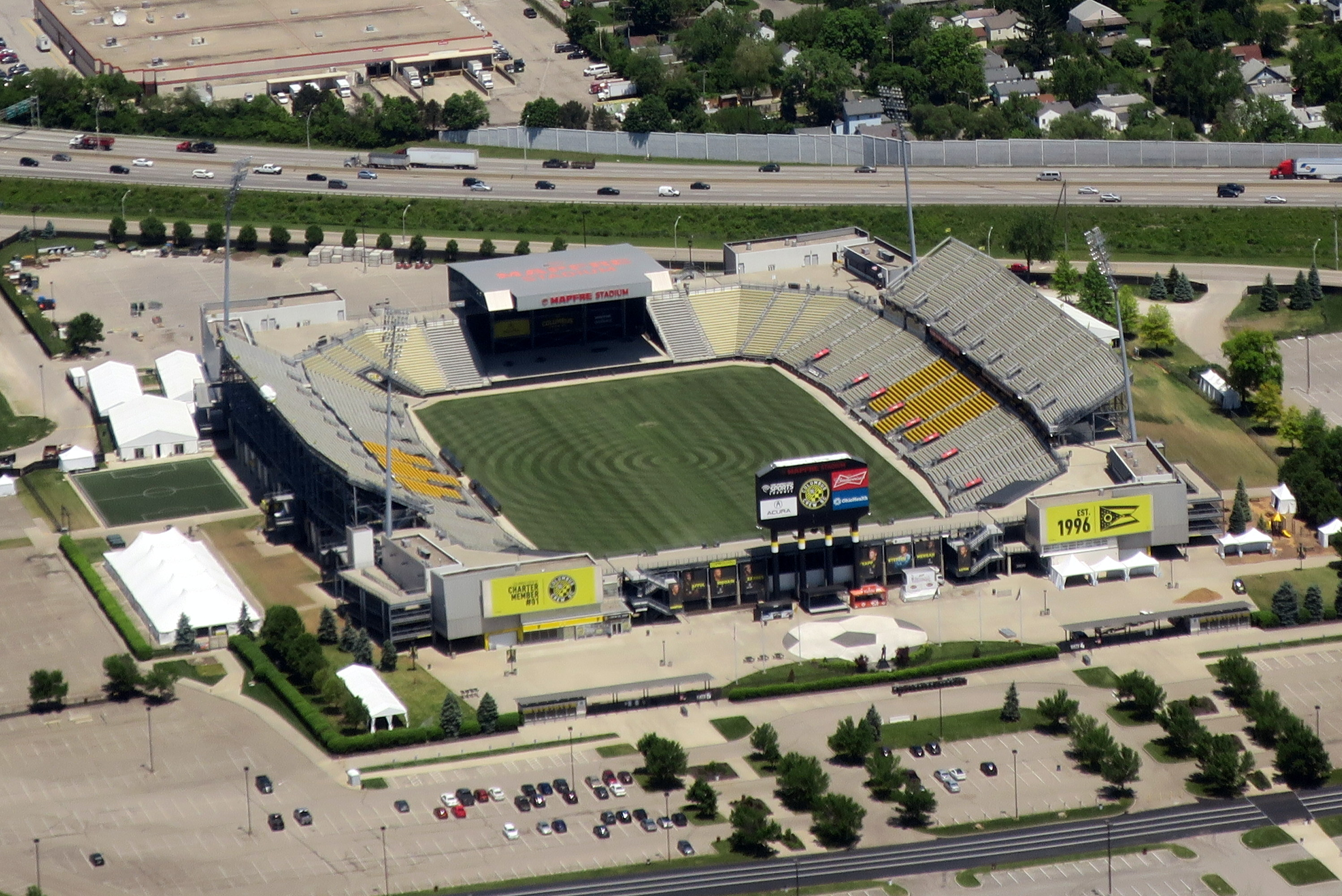
Columbus Crew Stadium, the league's first soccer-specific stadium, hosted MLS Cup 2001.

The match was played at Columbus Crew Stadium in Columbus, Ohio, and was the first MLS Cup to be hosted at a soccer-specific stadium. Lamar Hunt, owner of the Columbus Crew, built the $28.5 million stadium with soccer and concerts as its primary uses. It had a capacity of 22,500 seats (lower than most MLS venues of the time) and close-in seating next to the field. MLS awarded the hosting rights for the 2000 MLS All-Star Game and MLS Cup 2001 to Columbus during the stadium's groundbreaking ceremony on August 14, 1998. The stadium opened on May 15, 1999, and hosted several national team matches in the months before the MLS Cup. The design of Crew Stadium inspired similar soccer-specific stadiums, including the Home Depot Center for the Los Angeles Galaxy and Toyota Park for the Chicago Fire, which began construction in 2001.

== Road to the final ==
The MLS Cup is the post-season championship of Major League Soccer, a professional club soccer league based in the United States. The 2001 season was the sixth in the league's history and was contested by twelve teams organized into three divisions (later renamed conferences). Each team was to play a total of 28 matches in the regular season, which ran from April to September, facing teams within their division four times and outside of their division twice. The shortened schedule, with four fewer matches, and a smaller roster limited to 18 players under a $1.7 million salary cap reflected the league's financial troubles at the time. The MLS Cup Playoffs ran from mid-September to October and was contested by the winners of the three divisions and five wild card teams with the most points regardless of division, who were then seeded based on overall standings. The playoffs were organized into three rounds, the first two being a home-and-away series organized into a best-of-three format with the first team to earn five points advancing, and the single-match MLS Cup final.

MLS Cup 2001 was contested between the San Jose Earthquakes and the Los Angeles Galaxy, both from the Western Division. It was the first MLS Cup with finalists from the same division and the same state. San Jose had never appeared in an MLS Cup final, while Los Angeles lost the 1996 and 1999 finals to D.C. United. The finalists played each other twice during the regular season, both won by the Earthquakes, but two additional matches in the series to be played at the end of the regular season were canceled after the September 11 attacks, which shortened the league's season. Due to several teams having already played an extra match, playoff seeding was determined by points per game and matches began a week later. The Earthquakes and Galaxy also met each other in the quarterfinals of the U.S. Open Cup in July, which Los Angeles won 10–9 in a penalty shootout following a 1–1 draw after extra time.

=== San Jose Earthquakes ===
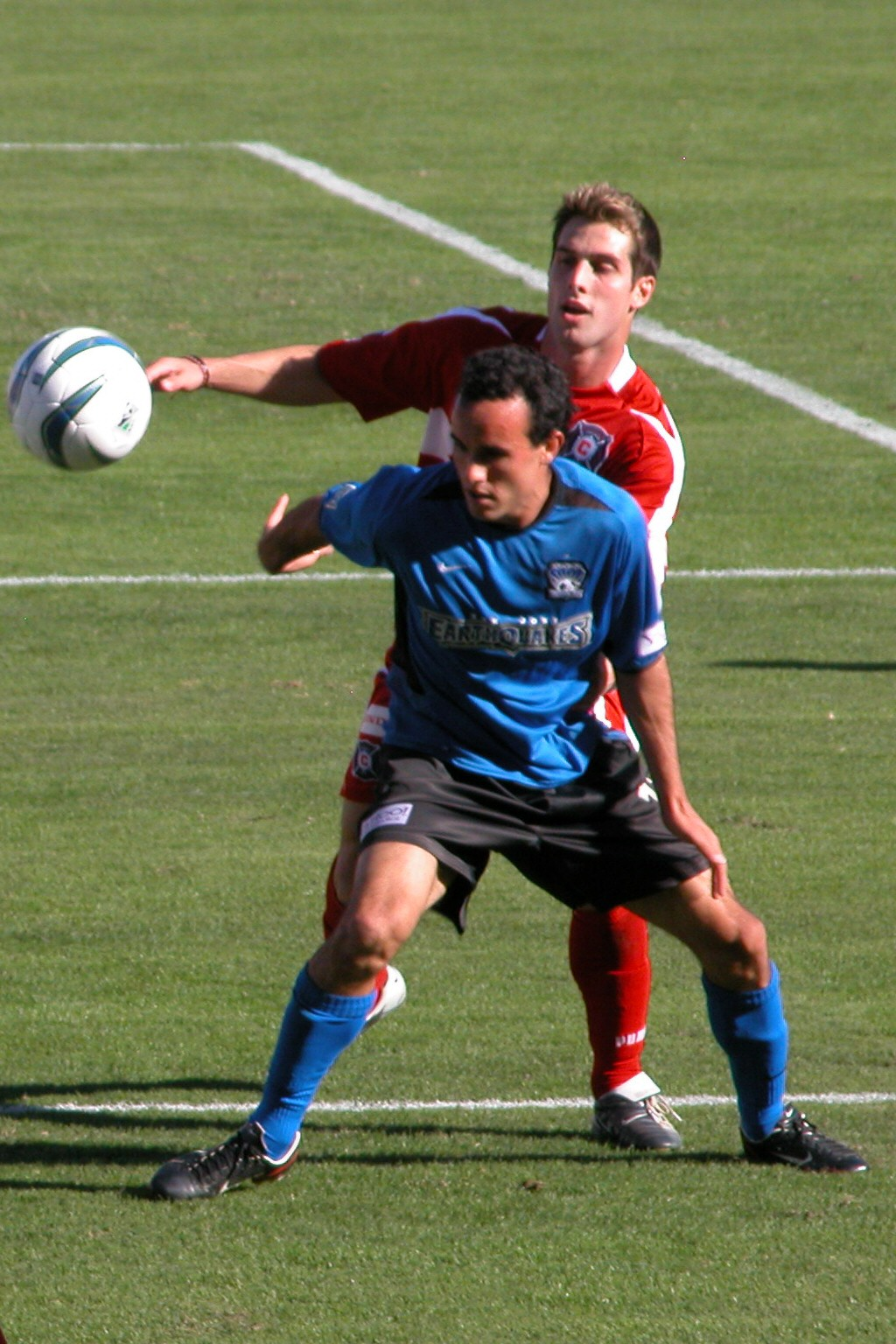
In his rookie season with San Jose, forward Landon Donovan scored two goals in the quarterfinals of the playoffs.

The San Jose Earthquakes, originally named the San Jose Clash until 2000, had historically been among the worst teams in the league and went through four coaching changes in its first six seasons. The Clash finished sixth overall in the inaugural season and qualified for the playoffs, where they were eliminated in the first round by the Galaxy. The team then missed the playoffs in the following five seasons, including four with losing records and finishing last in the league twice and second-to-last three times. The Earthquakes finished last in the league during the 2000 season with only seven wins and declined to renew the contract of head coach Lothar Osiander. Despite rumors that the team would fold, the San Jose Sharks of the National Hockey League took over business operations from the Kraft Sports Group in January 2001.

Former D.C. United assistant coach Frank Yallop was hired as San Jose's head coach days before the 2001 draft, where he began a series of player moves alongside assistant coach Dominic Kinnear. During the first week of Yallop's tenure, the Earthquakes acquired defender Jeff Agoos from D.C. United, Manny Lagos from the Tampa Bay Mutiny, and defender Zak Ibsen from the Los Angeles Galaxy. Yallop also used the league's allocation system to sign U.S. forward Landon Donovan from Bayer Leverkusen in March and Canadian forward Dwayne De Rosario from the Richmond Kickers of the second-division A-League. By the end of their preseason preparations in April, the team had also traded with the MetroStars for defender Ramiro Corrales and signed Danish midfielder Ronnie Ekelund.

The Earthquakes opened their regular season with a 3–2 win in the California Clásico over the Los Angeles Galaxy, but lost their next two matches to Dallas and Miami. The team then went on twelve-match unbeaten streak from late April to early July, winning seven matches and drawing in five, taking a lead in the Western Division standings ahead of Los Angeles. Yallop relied on a strong central core, consisting of Agoos and Troy Dayak in defense alongside Ekelund and Richard Mulrooney in the midfield to support the team's rotating attackers. Six players from the Earthquakes were named to the league's Western Division roster at the 2001 MLS All-Star Game, which was hosted at San Jose's Spartan Stadium.

In the last months of the season, the Earthquakes were defeated in several matches and lost their first-place spot to the Galaxy only to regain it on several occasions. San Jose clinched a playoff spot and second place in the Western Division with 45 points after losing to the Kansas City Wizards prior to the cancellation of the two remaining matches against the Galaxy. The Earthquakes finished the season with the best record and winning percentage in club history, while the defense lead the league with only 30 allowed goals. Frank Yallop was voted the MLS Coach of the Year, while Agoos earned Defender of the Year honors and Dayak was named the Comeback Player of the Year.

San Jose were seeded fifth in the playoffs and faced the fourth-seeded Columbus Crew, who had earned the same number of points but won a head-to-head tiebreaker. The Earthquakes won 3–1 during the first leg in Columbus, with Donovan scoring two goals and Manny Lagos scoring another after having his red card suspension rescinded by the league. San Jose defeated Columbus 3–0 in the second leg and advanced with six points to their first-ever MLS Cup semifinal. The Earthquakes fell 1–0 to the Supporters' Shield-winning Miami Fusion in the first leg of the semifinals, but responded with a 4–0 win at Spartan Stadium to tie the series at three points apiece and force a third match. The third match, played in Fort Lauderdale, remained scoreless into extra time, where Troy Dayak scored a golden goal in the 94th minute to clinch a series victory and San Jose's first appearance at an MLS Cup.

=== Los Angeles Galaxy ===
The Los Angeles Galaxy were one of the most successful teams during the early years of MLS, winning the Western Conference three times and appearing in five consecutive playoffs prior to 2001. The team advanced to the MLS Cup final in 1996 and 1999, losing both times to D.C. United. The Galaxy won the 1998 Supporters' Shield and the 2000 CONCACAF Champions' Cup, becoming the second MLS team to win a continental trophy. Sigi Schmid was named the team's head coach early in the 1999 season and took the team to the MLS Cup with an emphasis on defensive play. The team finished the 2000 season as the second-placed team in the Western Conference and were eliminated in the playoff semifinals by the division-leading Kansas City Wizards, who would go on to win the MLS Cup.

The Galaxy traded captain and veteran defender Robin Fraser to the Colorado Rapids before the 2001 season to meet the league's salary cap requirements. The team remained mostly unchanged from the 2000 season, with the addition of veteran defender Alexi Lalas and young forwards Brian Ching and Brian Mullan picked during the SuperDraft. Schmid planned to use a 3–5–2 formation to take advantage of the team's midfield depth, with the ability to switch to a 4–3–3 in certain situations.

Los Angeles lost its opening two matches to San Jose and Kansas City, but a change in several starting positions lead to three consecutive wins and a 4–4 draw with the Tampa Bay Mutiny. The Galaxy used its several wins to reach second in the Western Division standings, passing Kansas City but falling behind the unbeaten San Jose Earthquakes. The cancellation of the 2001 FIFA Club World Championship left a gap in the team's schedule in late July and early August, which was partially replaced with previously-rescheduled league matches. By early September, the Galaxy had begun challenging the Earthquakes for first place in the Western Division, winning seven of nine matches before a scheduled two-match series against San Jose to close out the regular season. After the matches were canceled, Los Angeles was declared the Western Division champion with 47 points and seeded third in the playoffs bracket.

The Galaxy played against the sixth-seeded New York/New Jersey MetroStars in the quarterfinals, coached by former Galaxy manager Octavio Zambrano. The first leg, at the Rose Bowl, ended in a 1–1 draw after a second-half goal by Paul Caligiuri, who was ejected in the second half alongside MetroStars midfielder Gilmar. The second leg, played at Giants Stadium in New Jersey, was one of the first sporting events in the New York City area following the September 11 attacks; the MetroStars defeated the Galaxy by a 4–1 scoreline, coming from behind after conceding an early goal to Los Angeles, and took a three-point lead in the quarterfinals series. Los Angeles hosted the third match of the series at the Rose Bowl and took a 2–0 lead in the first half on two goals by Sasha Victorine. After conceding a third goal in the second half, the MetroStars responded with two goals by Petter Villegas, losing 3–2 to the Galaxy in regular time to tie the series at four points apiece. The tie went into sudden death extra time, which ended after eight minutes when Mauricio Cienfuegos scored the winning golden goal for Los Angeles.

In a rematch of the U.S. Open Cup semifinal, Los Angeles faced the Chicago Fire, winners of the Central Division, in the MLS Cup semifinals. The first leg at Chicago's Soldier Field ended in a 1–1 draw between the two teams after an overtime goal by Cobi Jones was ruled invalid due to a tackle by Brian Mullan. The Galaxy won 1–0 overtime in the second leg on a golden goal from Peter Vagenas. The third and final leg, also hosted at Soldier Field, remained tied at 1–1 after regular time and finished with a golden goal scored by Cienfuegos in the 98th minute of extra time. With their 2–1 victory over Chicago, the Los Angeles Galaxy advanced to their third MLS Cup final in six seasons. The team would also have a chance to be the first American team to win a continental treble, having already won the CONCACAF Champions' Cup in January and being scheduled to play in the U.S. Open Cup final a week after the MLS Cup.

=== Summary of results ===
Note: In all results below, the score of the finalist is given first (H: home; A: away). Playoffs were in best-of-three format requiring five points to advance and sudden death extra time as a tiebreaker.

San Jose Earthquakes				Round	Los Angeles Galaxy			
2nd place in Western Division: Pos. / Club / Pld. / W / L / D / Pts.; 1 / Los Angeles Galaxy / 26 / 14 / 7 / 5 / 47; 2 / San Jose Earthquakes / 26 / 13 / 7 / 6 / 45; 3 / Kansas City Wizards / 27 / 11 / 13 / 3 / 36; 4 / Colorado Rapids / 26 / 5 / 13 / 4 / 23; Source: MLS Qualified for playoffs				Regular season	1st place in Western Division: Pos. / Club / Pld. / W / L / D / Pts.; 1 / Los Angeles Galaxy / 26 / 14 / 7 / 5 / 47; 2 / San Jose Earthquakes / 26 / 13 / 7 / 6 / 45; 3 / Kansas City Wizards / 27 / 11 / 13 / 3 / 36; 4 / Colorado Rapids / 26 / 5 / 13 / 4 / 23; Source: MLS Qualified for playoffs			
Opponent (Pts.)	1st leg	2nd leg	3rd leg	MLS Cup Playoffs	Opponent (Pts.)	1st leg	2nd leg	3rd leg
Columbus Crew (6–0)	3–1 (A)	3–0 (H)	—	Quarterfinals	MetroStars (4–4)	1–1 (H)	1–4 (A)	3–2 (SDET) (H)
Miami Fusion (6–3)	0–1 (A)	4–0 (H)	1–0 (a.e.t.) (A)	Semifinals	Chicago Fire (7–1)	1–1 (A)	1–0 (a.e.t.) (H)	2–1 (a.e.t.) (A)

== Broadcasting ==
The MLS Cup final was televised in the United States on ABC in English and Spanish. The network moved the start time of the match by one hour from 1:30 p.m. Eastern Time to 12:30 p.m. to accommodate scheduling changes caused by the September 11 attacks. The English commentary crew consisted of Jack Edwards for play-by-play, Ty Keough with color analysis, and other programming hosted by Rob Stone and Dave Dir. The Spanish broadcast was transmitted over secondary audio programming on ABC and was headlined by play-by-play commentator Hammer Londoño and color analyst Hernan Pereyra of Radio Unica. The match was also broadcast in 108 other countries by ESPN International. The ABC broadcast earned a 1.0 Nielsen rating, beating the previous two editions of the cup.

== Match ==
=== Summary ===
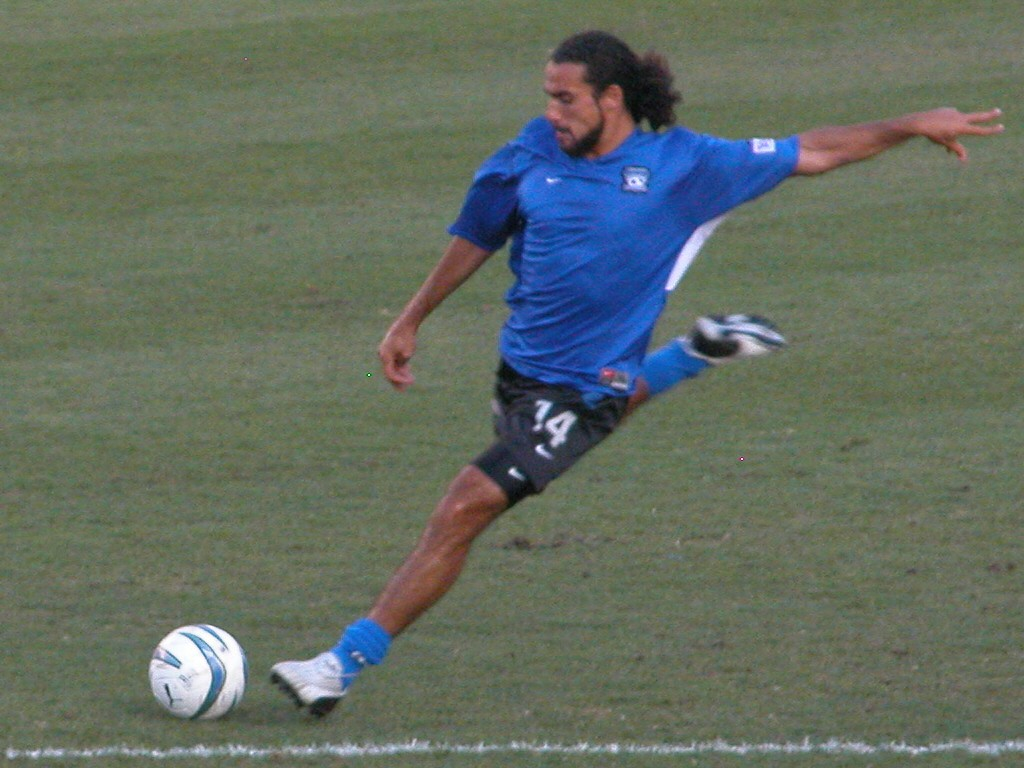
Dwayne De Rosario scored the golden goal to win the MLS Cup for San Jose and was named the match MVP.

The match was played only four days after the MLS Cup semifinals, in front of a predominantly neutral crowd of 21,626 at Columbus Crew Stadium with several thousand no-show ticketholders. A group of about 100 Chicago Fire supporters appeared at the match to taunt the Galaxy with chants and drums. The pregame ceremony included an appearance by six members of the New York City Fire Department and New York City Police Department and the national anthem sung by Toya. The match was the first MLS Cup to be refereed by Kevin Stott, who previously served as the fourth official at MLS Cup 2000.

The Earthquakes began the match with the majority of possession, which was used to build up to several attacking chances that were cleared away by Galaxy goalkeeper Kevin Hartman. Los Angeles, however, had a chance of its own in the 14th minute on a cross by Cobi Jones towards Sasha Victorine that was passed on to Mauricio Cienfuegos, whose shot was cleared away by San Jose. The Galaxy opened the scoring in 21st minute on a goal by Luis Hernández, who received a 40-yard (37 m) pass from defender Greg Vanney. Los Angeles then missed an opportunity to take a 2–0 lead in the 35th minute after a shot from Cobi Jones was saved by goalkeeper Joe Cannon. The Earthquakes found an equalizing goal shortly before half-time in the 43rd minute on a play started by Ian Russell's run down the right wing. He slipped a pass to Richard Mulrooney, whose cross over the box was volleyed by Landon Donovan into the top-right corner of the goal.

San Jose went on to outshoot Los Angeles 12–3 in the second half and created several chances to score, including a free kick taken by Jeff Agoos that hit the left goalpost. After receiving a yellow card for a challenge on Ian Russell, Galaxy defender Paul Caligiuri was substituted in the 53rd minute—marking the end of his MLS career. Three additional yellow cards were issued in the second half to Danny Califf, Ronnie Ekelund, and Zak Ibsen; Ibsen had only been substituted a minute before drawing the card. Dwayne De Rosario was substituted into the game in the 85th minute for Ronald Cerritos, shortly before the tied match forced a sudden-death overtime. De Rosario scored the winning golden goal in the sixth minute of overtime with a dribble around Califf and a shot from 17 yards (16 m) that Hartman managed to touch, but was unable to save. It was the second time in MLS Cup history that the title was decided by a golden goal, following the inaugural edition between D.C. United and the Galaxy.

=== Details ===
October 21, 2001
12:30 EDT

San Jose Earthquakes	2–1 (a.e.t./g.g.)	Los Angeles Galaxy
Donovan 43'; De Rosario 96'	Report	Hernández 21'

Columbus Crew Stadium, Columbus, Ohio
Attendance: 21,626
Referee: Kevin Stott

San Jose Earthquakes
Los Angeles Galaxy

GK	1	(United States) Joe Cannon
DF	12	(United States) Jeff Agoos (c)
DF	17	(United States) Jimmy Conrad	(yellow card) 28'
DF	19	(United States) Troy Dayak
DF	24	(United States) Wade Barrett
MF	5	(United States) Ramiro Corrales
MF	6	(Denmark) Ronnie Ekelund	(yellow card) 78'
MF	8	(United States) Richard Mulrooney
MF	15	(United States) Ian Russell		(substituted off) 82'
FW	10	(United States) Landon Donovan
FW	20	(El Salvador) Ronald Cerritos		(substituted off) 85'
Substitutes:
GK	0	(United States) Jon Conway
DF	22	(United States) Zak Ibsen	(yellow card) 83'	(substituted on) 82'
MF	11	(United States) Manny Lagos
MF	15	(United States) Ian Russell
FW	9	(United States) Scott Bower
FW	14	(Canada) Dwayne De Rosario		(substituted on) 85'
FW	15	(England) Junior Agogo
Manager:
(Canada) Frank Yallop

GK	22	(United States) Kevin Hartman
DF	3	(United States) Greg Vanney
DF	17	(Saint Vincent and the Grenadines) Ezra Hendrickson
DF	20	(United States) Paul Caligiuri	(yellow card) 48'	(substituted off) 53'
DF	23	(United States) Danny Califf	(yellow card) 76'
MF	8	(United States) Peter Vagenas
MF	10	(El Salvador) Mauricio Cienfuegos
MF	12	(New Zealand) Simon Elliott
MF	13	(United States) Cobi Jones (c)
FW	11	(United States) Sasha Victorine		(substituted off) 75'
FW	15	(Mexico) Luis Hernández
Substitutes:
GK	1	(United States) Matt Reis
DF	5	(United States) Craig Waibel
DF	18	(United States) Adam Frye		(substituted on) 53'
FW	7	(United States) Isaias Bardales Jr.
FW	9	(United States) Brian Ching
FW	16	(United States) Brian Mullan		(substituted on) 75'
FW	25	(El Salvador) Marvin Quijano
Manager:
(United States) Sigi Schmid

MLS Cup Most Valuable Player:
Dwayne De Rosario (San Jose Earthquakes)

Assistant referees:
(United States) Roger Itaya
(United States) Daniel Wilson
Fourth official:
(United States) Paul Tamberino

Match rules

- 90 minutes of regulation time
- Two 15-minute periods of extra time with a golden goal to decide a winner.
- Penalty shootout if scores still tied.
- Maximum of three substitutions for outfield players and an additional substitution for the goalkeeper.

== Post-match ==
The Earthquakes completed a "worst to first" finish, which was named the greatest turnaround in MLS history. Frank Yallop became the first former MLS player to win the MLS Cup as head coach, as well as the first non-American manager to win the championship. Dwayne De Rosario was named the MLS Cup MVP for his golden goal, despite entering the match in the 85th minute. The Galaxy lost their third final in six years, with the match against San Jose described as the "most difficult" by coach Sigi Schmid. The Galaxy went on to win the 2001 U.S. Open Cup a week later, defeating the New England Revolution 2–1 in overtime. Los Angeles met New England again at MLS Cup 2002, winning 1–0 in overtime for their first MLS Cup title. San Jose won their second MLS Cup in the 2003 final at the Galaxy's newly-constructed soccer-specific stadium, the Home Depot Center in Carson, California, after eliminating the hosts in the playoffs.

San Jose qualified for the 2002 CONCACAF Champions' Cup alongside the finalists from MLS Cup 2000, Chicago and Kansas City, due to the cancellation of the previous Champions' Cup and the transition to the new, expanded cup format. The Earthquakes advanced from the first round against C.D. Olimpia by winning 1–0 at the Miami Orange Bowl and 3–1 at a small stadium in Sacramento. San Jose then faced C.F. Pachuca in the quarterfinals and lost 3–0 in the away leg played in Mexico. The Earthquakes rallied to win 1–0 the following week in the home leg, but were eliminated from the cup with an aggregate score of 1–3.

The Earthquakes and its players were later relocated to Houston after the 2005 season, becoming the Houston Dynamo. The Dynamo won consecutive MLS Cup championships in their first two seasons after relocation, while the Earthquakes returned to the league as an expansion team in the 2008 season. The Galaxy went on to win five MLS Cup titles, including two against the Dynamo in the 2011 and 2012 finals.
