= Luis Hernández (footballer, born 1968) =

Mexican footballer

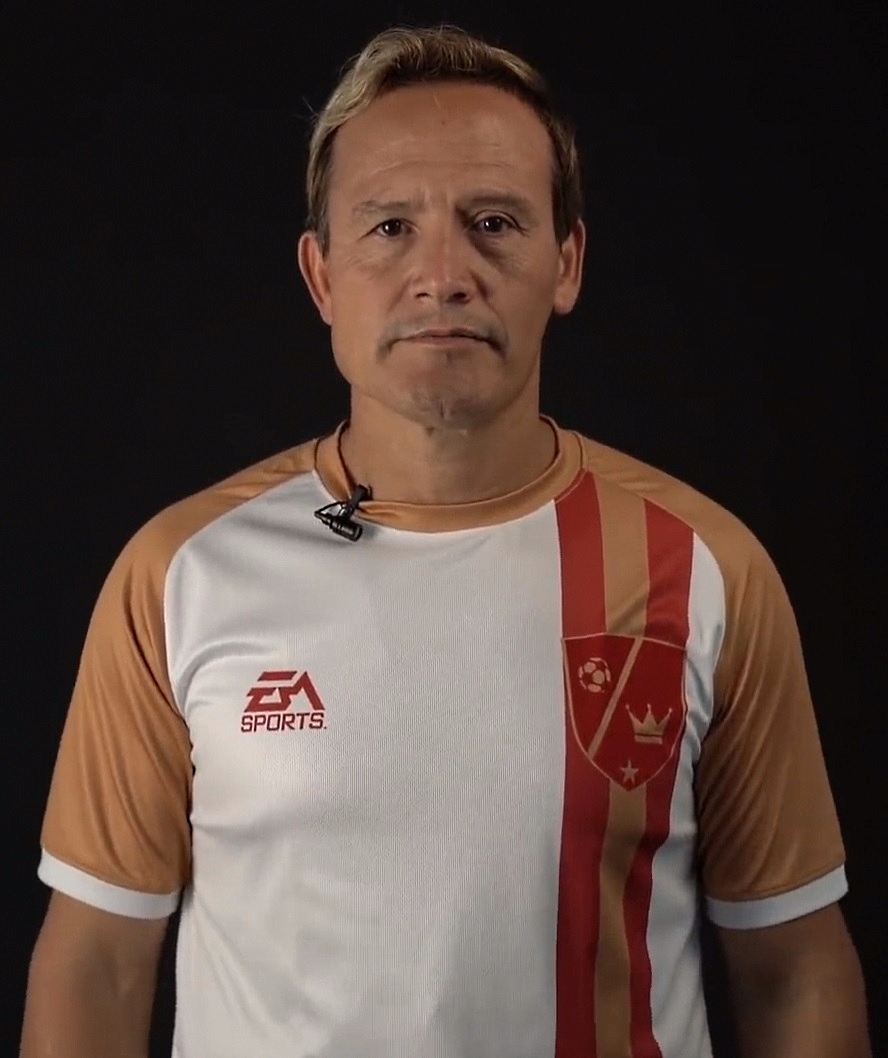
- Hernández in 2017

Personal information
- Full name: Luis Arturo Hernández Carreón
- Date of birth: 22 December 1968 (age 57)
- Place of birth: Poza Rica, Veracruz, Mexico
- Height: 1.75 m (5 ft 9 in)
- Position: Striker

Youth career
- –1990: Cruz Azul

Senior career*
Years	Team	Apps	(Gls)
1990–1991	Cruz Azul	18	(1)
1991–1992	Querétaro	28	(11)
1992–1994	Monterrey	62	(15)
1994–1998	Necaxa	125	(37)
1997	→ Boca Juniors (loan)	4	(2)
1998–2000	Tigres UANL	64	(39)
2000–2003	LA Galaxy	40	(15)
2001–2003	→ América (loan)	43	(9)
2003	Veracruz	18	(5)
2004	Chiapas	5	(1)
2004–2005	Lobos BUAP	9	(4)
Total		521	(139)

International career
1995–2002	Mexico	85	(35)
Medal record
Men's football
Representing Mexico
FIFA Confederations Cup
Winner	1999 Mexico
CONCACAF Gold Cup
Winner	1996 United States
Winner	1998 United States
Copa América
Third place	1997 Bolivia
Third place	1999 Paraguay
Pan American Games
Silver medal – second place	1995 Mar del Plata	Team
- * Club domestic league appearances and goals

Luis Arturo Hernández Carreón (born 22 December 1968), commonly known as El Matador (English: The Bullfighter), is a Mexican former professional footballer. He is widely regarded as one of Mexico's most talented strikers, as well as one of the best North American players of all time.

On the international stage, Hernández made 85 appearances and scored 35 goals. He represented Mexico at the FIFA World Cup in 1998 and 2002. Along with Javier Hernández and Julián Quiñones, he is Mexico's all-time leading FIFA World Cup goalscorer.

== Club career ==
Born on 22 December 1968, in Poza Rica, Veracruz, Hernández began his professional career as a center forward with Cruz Azul, making his first-team debut on 22 August 1990, at the age of 21. He stayed with the club until 1992, splitting his playing time with affiliate side Querétaro. That year, he joined Monterrey, and two seasons later moved to Necaxa. His arrival coincided with a remarkable era of success for the club, during which they captured two consecutive Primera División titles, the Copa México, the CONCACAF Cup Winners Cup, and the Campeón de Campeones.

His prolific scoring and dynamic play earned him a call from Boca Juniors in 1997, personally recommended by Diego Maradona and Julio César Toresani after his standout performance in the Copa América that year. In Argentina, his resemblance to Claudio Caniggia earned him the nickname El Pájaro (“The Bird”), but his time there was short-lived. With Boca's foreign player quota already filled, Hernández saw limited action, featuring only in three Supercopa Sudamericana matches before returning to Mexico a month later.

Back with Necaxa, he rediscovered his form, scoring 9 goals in just 12 matches, before moving to Tigres UANL. With Tigres, he netted 38 goals in 64 games and achieved the rare feat of scoring in the Clásico Regiomontano for both Monterrey clubs, Monterrey and Tigres.

In 2000, Hernández took his talents to the United States, signing with the Los Angeles Galaxy in Major League Soccer. Over two seasons, he scored 15 goals in 40 appearances across league and playoff matches. He returned to Mexico in 2002, playing for Club América, Veracruz, Chiapas, and Lobos BUAP before bringing his playing career to a close in 2005.

== International career ==
Hernández earned his first international cap for Mexico on 1 February 1995, in a match against Uruguay. Later that year, he netted his first international goal against Yugoslavia.

Hernández rose to prominence during the 1997 Copa América, where he struck six times to finish as the tournament's top scorer. His momentum carried into the 1998 FIFA World Cup, where he scored four goals—making him one of the competition's leading scorers and the first Mexican player to record more than two goals in a single World Cup.

On January 31, 2001, Hernández netted his 35th international goal, surpassing Carlos Hermosillo’s record to become Mexico’s all-time leading scorer

He also featured in the 2002 FIFA World Cup, appearing as a substitute in three matches but failing to find the net. His final appearance for the national team came on 17 June 2002, in a match against the United States.

He retired from the national team as its all-time leading goalscorer, a record he held until Jared Borgetti surpassed it three years later.

== Career statistics ==
=== Club ===
Appearances and goals by club, season and competition
Club	Season	League		
Club	Season	Division	Apps	Goals
Cruz Azul	1990–91	Mexican Primera División	18	1
Querétaro	1991–92	Mexican Primera División	28	11
Monterrey	1992–93	Mexican Primera División	26	6
Monterrey	1993–94	Mexican Primera División	32	8
Monterrey	Total		58	14
Necaxa	1994–95	Mexican Primera División	30	8
Necaxa	1995–96	Mexican Primera División	31	10
Necaxa	1996–97	Mexican Primera División	39	14
Necaxa	1997–98	Mexican Primera División	12	9
Necaxa	Total		112	41
Boca Juniors (loan)	1997–98	Argentine Primera División	4	2
Tigres UANL	1998–99	Mexican Primera División	33	19
Tigres UANL	1999–2000	Mexican Primera División	31	19
Tigres UANL	Total		64	38
LA Galaxy	2000	Major League Soccer	16	5
LA Galaxy	2001	Major League Soccer	14	8
LA Galaxy	Total		30	13
América (loan)	2001–02	Mexican Primera División	14	2
América (loan)	2002–03	Mexican Primera División	2	0
América (loan)	Total		16	2
Veracruz	2002–03	Mexican Primera División	18	5
Chiapas	2003–04	Mexican Primera División	5	1
Lobos BUAP	2004–05	Primera División A	9	4
Career total			362	132

=== International ===
Appearances and goals by national team and year
National team	Year	Apps	Goals
Mexico	1995	5	2
Mexico	1996	6	0
Mexico	1997	21	10
Mexico	1998	16	14
Mexico	1999	18	6
Mexico	2000	9	2
Mexico	2001	4	1
Mexico	2002	6	0
Total		85	35

Scores and results list Mexico's goal tally first, score column indicates score after each Hernández goal.

List of international goals scored by Luis Hernández
No.	Date	Venue	Opponent	Score	Result	Competition	Ref.
1	15 November 1995	Estadio Tecnológico, Monterrey, Mexico	Yugoslavia	1–2	1–4	Friendly	
2	6 December 1995	Estadio Héroe de Nacozari, Hermosillo, Mexico	Slovenia	1–0	1–2	Friendly	
3	17 January 1997	Rose Bowl, Pasadena, United States	Denmark	2–0	3–1	Friendly	
4	13 April 1997	Estadio Azteca, Mexico City, Mexico	Jamaica	6–0	6–0	1998 FIFA World Cup qualification	
5	20 April 1997	Foxboro Stadium, Foxborough, United States	United States	2–1	2–2	1998 FIFA World Cup qualification	
6	13 June 1997	Estadio Ramón Tahuichi Aguilera, Santa Cruz, Bolivia	Colombia	1–0	2–1	1997 Copa America	
7	13 June 1997	Estadio Ramón Tahuichi Aguilera, Santa Cruz, Bolivia	Colombia	2–0	2–1	1997 Copa America	
8	16 June 1997	Estadio Ramón Tahuichi Aguilera, Santa Cruz, Bolivia	Brazil	1–0	2–3	1997 Copa America	
9	16 June 1997	Estadio Ramón Tahuichi Aguilera, Santa Cruz, Bolivia	Brazil	2–0	2–3	1997 Copa America	
10	19 June 1997	Estadio Ramón Tahuichi Aguilera, Santa Cruz, Bolivia	Costa Rica	1–0	1–1	1997 Copa America	
11	28 June 1997	Estadio Jesús Bermúdez, Oruro, Bolivia	Peru	1–0	1–0	1997 Copa America	
12	12 December 1997	King Fahd International Stadium, Riyadh, Saudi Arabia	Australia	1–2	1–3	1997 FIFA Confederations Cup	
13	4 February 1998	Oakland Coliseum, Oakland, United States	Trinidad and Tobago	2–1	4–2	1998 CONCACAF Gold Cup	
14	4 February 1998	Oakland Coliseum, Oakland, United States	Trinidad and Tobago	4–2	4–2	1998 CONCACAF Gold Cup	
15	12 February 1998	Los Angeles Memorial Coliseum, Los Angeles, United States	Jamaica	1–0	1–0	1998 CONCACAF Gold Cup	
16	15 February 1998	Los Angeles Memorial Coliseum, Los Angeles, United States	United States	1–0	1–0	1998 CONCACAF Gold Cup	
17	15 April 1998	Los Angeles Memorial Coliseum, Los Angeles, United States	Peru	1–0	1–0	Friendly	
18	9 May 1998	Montecatini Terme, Italy	Estonia	2–0	6–0	Friendly	
19	9 May 1998	Montecatini Terme, Italy	Estonia	4–0	6–0	Friendly	
20	9 May 1998	Montecatini Terme, Italy	Estonia	6–0	6–0	Friendly	
21	13 June 1998	Stade de Gerland, Lyon, France	South Korea	2–1	3–1	1998 FIFA World Cup	
22	13 June 1998	Stade de Gerland, Lyon, France	South Korea	3–1	3–1	1998 FIFA World Cup	
23	25 June 1998	Stade Geoffroy-Guichard, Saint-Étienne, France	Netherlands	2–2	2–2	1998 FIFA World Cup	
24	29 June 1998	Stade de la Mosson, Montpellier, France	Germany	1–0	1–2	1998 FIFA World Cup	
25	17 November 1998	Los Angeles Memorial Coliseum, Los Angeles, United States	El Salvador	1–0	2–0	Friendly	
26	18 November 1998	Los Angeles Memorial Coliseum, Los Angeles, United States	Guatemala	1–0	2–2	Friendly	
27	19 February 1999	Hong Kong Stadium, Causeway Bay, Hong Kong	Egypt	3–0	3–0	Friendly	
28	9 June 1999	Soldier Field, Chicago, United States	Argentina	1–0	2–2	Friendly	
29	16 June 1999	Dongdaemun Stadium, Seoul, South Korea	Croatia	1–0	1–2	Friendly	
30	30 June 1999	Estadio Antonio Aranda, Ciudad del Este, Paraguay	Chile	1–0	1–0	1999 Copa America	
31	10 July 1999	Estadio Defensores del Chaco, Asunción, Paraguay	Peru	1–2	3–3	1999 Copa America	
32	10 July 1999	Estadio Defensores del Chaco, Asunción, Paraguay	Peru	2–2	3–3	1999 Copa America	
33	9 January 2000	Oakland Coliseum, Oakland, United States	Iran	1–0	2–1	Friendly	
34	13 February 2000	San Diego Stadium, San Diego, United States	Trinidad and Tobago	2–0	4–0	2000 CONCACAF Gold Cup	
35	31 January 2001	Los Angeles Memorial Coliseum, Los Angeles, United States	Colombia	2–0	2–3	Friendly	

== Honours ==
Monterrey

- Mexican Primera División runner-up: 1992–93
- CONCACAF Cup Winners Cup: 1993

Necaxa

- Mexican Primera División: 1994–95, 1995–96
- Copa México: 1994–95
- Campeón de Campeones: 1995
- CONCACAF Cup Winners Cup: 1994

Boca Juniors

- Argentine Primera División runner-up: Apertura 1997

LA Galaxy

- MLS Cup runner-up: 2001
- Western Conference Regular Season: 2001
- U.S. Open Cup: 2001
- CONCACAF Champions Cup: 2000

América

- Mexican Primera División: Verano 2002
- CONCACAF Giants Cup: 2001
- Selectivo Pre Pre Libertadores: 2001
- Copa Pre Libertadores: 2001

Mexico

- FIFA Confederation Cup: 1999
- Copa América runner-up: 2001; third place: 1997, 1999
- CONCACAF Gold Cup: 1996, 1998
- Pan American Games Silver Medal: 1995

Individual

- Copa América 2000th Goal Award: 1997
- Copa América Golden Boot: 1997
- FIFA World Player of the Year Nomination: 1997
- FIFA World XI: 1998
- FIFA World Cup Third Top Scorer: 1998
- South American Team of the Year: 1998
- CONCACAF Gold Cup Golden Boot: 1998
- IFFHS World's Best Top Goal Scorer third place: 1998
- South American Player of the Year Nomination: 1998
- RSSSF Player of the Year Nomination: 1998, 1999
- Copa América Third Top Scorer: 1999
- Lunar New Year Cup Third Top Scorer: 1999
- MLS All-Star: 2000, 2001
- LA Galaxy All-time Roster
- FIFA International Football Hall of Fame: 2012
- FIFA Legend
- Maratón de Monterrey: 2023
- FIFA Juego de Leyendas: 2024

Records

- Mexico's all-time leading FIFA World Cup goalscorer
