= Brian Mullan =

American soccer player (born 1978)

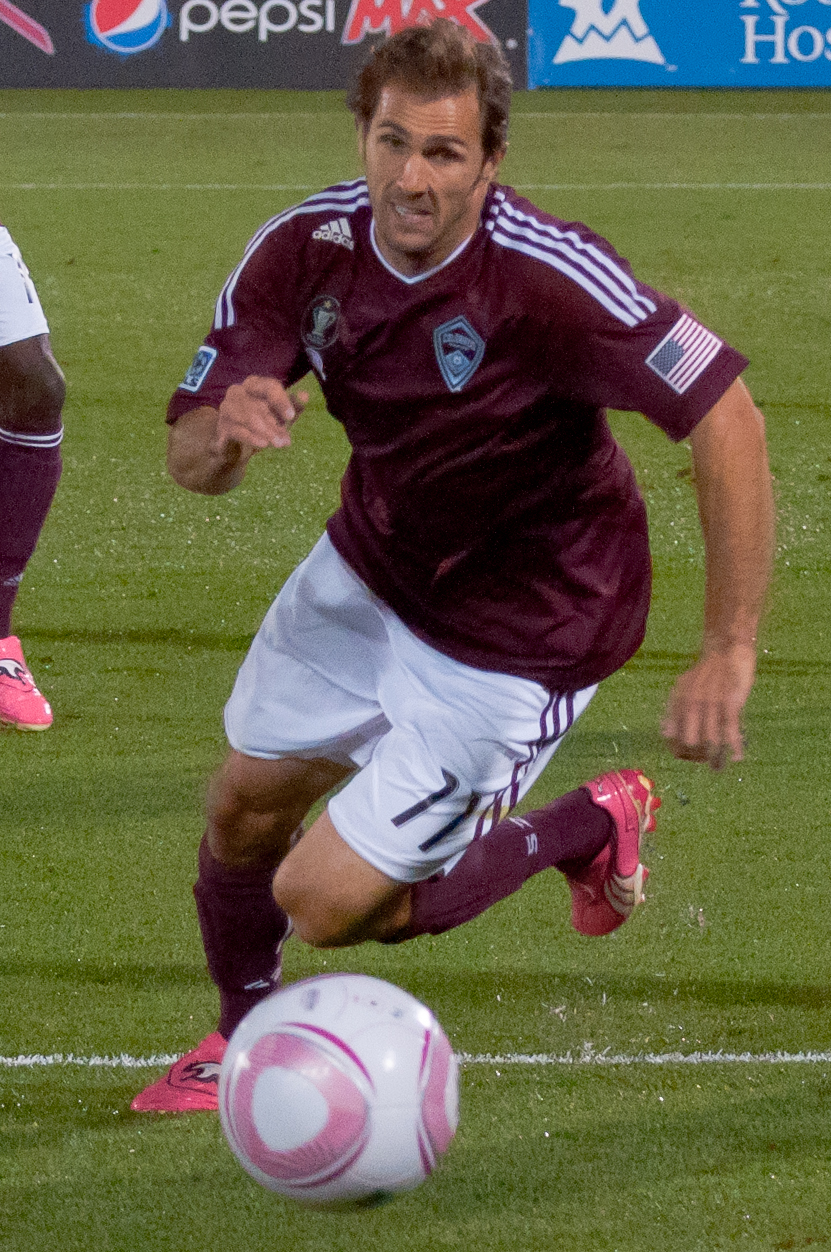
- Mullan with Colorado Rapids in 2011

Personal information
- Date of birth: April 23, 1978 (age 48)
- Place of birth: Mineola, New York, United States
- Height: 5 ft 8 in (1.73 m)
- Position: Midfielder

College career
Years	Team	Apps	(Gls)
1997–2000	Creighton Bluejays	88	(36)

Senior career*
Years	Team	Apps	(Gls)
1999	Wisconsin Rebels		
2001–2002	Los Angeles Galaxy	31	(5)
2003–2005	San Jose Earthquakes	83	(12)
2006–2010	Houston Dynamo	136	(9)
2010–2014	Colorado Rapids	73	(3)
Total		323	(29)

International career
2004–2007	United States	4	(0)
- * Club domestic league appearances and goals

Brian Mullan (born April 23, 1978) is an American former professional soccer player. He played for the Los Angeles Galaxy, San Jose Earthquakes, Houston Dynamo, and Colorado Rapids in Major League Soccer. He won five MLS Cups, two Supporters' Shields, and one U.S. Open Cup during his career. He is one of only four players to have won MLS Cup five or more times. He also won four caps for the United States between 2004 and 2007. Not a flashy player, Mullan was known for his work rate, hustle, and determination on the field.

== Youth and college career ==
Mullan was born in Mineola, New York, but his family moved to Littleton, Colorado, a suburb of Denver, when he was young. He played hockey growing up before deciding to focus on soccer full time. He attended Regis Jesuit High School in nearby Aurora, Colorado. Mullan led Regis Jesuit to a Colorado 4A Boys Soccer State Championship in 1995 and a 5A State Championship in 1996. In the 5A title game in 1996, Mullan scored a hat-trick and had one assist to help Regis Jesuit win 5–3. He also received numerous individual accolades for his high school career, including being named a 1996 NSCAA/Umbro High School Boys All-American and the 1996 NSCAA/Umbro Colorado Player of the Year.

He played his college soccer at Creighton University from 1997 to 2000, where he led the Bluejays to Missouri Valley Conference Men's Soccer Tournament titles in 1997, 1998, and 2000 with Mullan being named Tournament MVP in 2000. He also helped Creighton reach the NCAA Division I Men's Soccer Tournament final, their only appearance in the title game in school history. His individual honors during his time in college include NSCAA All-America Second Team in 2000, NCAA College Cup All-Tournament Team in 2000, First Team All-Conference in 1998, 1999, and 2000, Second Team All-Conference in 1997, and MVC All-Freshman team in 1997. He ranks 6th in all time goals, 4th in all-time assists, and 4th in all time appearances for the Bluejays. in 2008, Mullan was selected to the Creighton Athletics Hall of Fame.

While in college, he played for the Wisconsin Rebels in 1999 and the Colorado Comets, both in the Premier Development League.

== Club career ==
=== Los Angeles Galaxy ===
Upon graduating, Mullan was drafted 9th overall by the Los Angeles Galaxy in the 2001 MLS SuperDraft. He missed the start of the season due to surgery to repair a torn meniscus in his left knee. He made his professional debut on April 21, getting the start in a 1–0 win over the Colorado Rapids. In the Galaxy's next game, Mullan recorded his first career assist in a 3–2 win over the Rapids. On May 9, Mullan scored the first two goals of his pro career, with the second coming in the 92nd minute to give LA a 4–4 draw with the Tampa Bay Mutiny. He underwent ankle surgery to repair a torn ligament on July 24 that kept him out for the remainder of the regular season. The Galaxy finished top of the Western Conference in Mullan's absence, qualifying for the playoffs. Los Angeles advanced past the MetroStars in the first round in three games. Mullan returned from the injury in time to face the Chicago Fire in the semifinals. He appeared in all three games of the series and recorded an assist on Mauricio Cienfuegos's sudden death, series winning game in extra time. At MLS Cup 2001, Los Angeles fell to the San Jose Earthquakes 2–1, with Mullan appearing off the bench in the game. In the 2001 U.S. Open Cup final, Mullan came on as a substitute to help LA defeat the New England Revolution 2–1, the first Open Cup title in Galaxy history.

On May 4, 2002, Mullan scored his first goal of the 2002 season in a 2–1 win over the Kansas City Wizards. On August 17, Mullan recorded two assists in a 4–0 Galaxy win against the Rapids. He finished the regular season with 3 goals and 2 assists from 21 appearances, helping the Galaxy win the 2002 Supporters' Shield. Mullan made four appearances off the bench during LA's six playoff games, helping the Galaxy win MLS Cup 2002, the first MLS Cup victory in club history. He also made three appearances in the 2002 U.S. Open Cup as he helped the Galaxy reach the final, where they lost to the Columbus Crew.

Although Mullan had played as a striker throughout his career, Galaxy head coach Sigi Schmid felt Mullan was better suited to play as a right midfielder. Unfortunately for Mullan, MLS All-Star and U.S. national team star Cobi Jones played in that position for the Galaxy. Because the Galaxy were not willing to trade Jones, Schmid began looking to move Mullan to a different team.

=== San Jose Earthquakes ===
On January 17, 2003, Mullan was traded to the San Jose Earthquakes for a 2003 MLS SuperDraft second round pick. Mullan made his debut for the Earthquakes on March 16, getting the start in a 4–2 loss to C.S.D. Municipal in the CONCACAF Champions' Cup Round of 16. He would start the second leg as well, a 2–1 San Jose win, with Municipal advancing 5–4 on aggregate. On April 12, Mullan recorded an assist on Brian Ching's goal in the 1st minute to help the Earthquakes to a 2–1 win over the Colorado Rapids in San Jose's first game of the MLS season. In their next game, he scored his first goal for the Quakes to give San Jose a 1–1 draw with the Kansas City Wizards. Mullan enjoyed a productive first season playing as a wide midfielder, scoring 6 goals and adding 9 assists in the regular season, both career highs. He started all 30 regular season games as he helped the Earthquakes finish first in the Western Conference and second overall. In the first round of the playoffs, San Jose faced off with Mullan's former team, the Los Angeles Galaxy. After losing the first leg 2–0, San Jose returned home only to have the Galaxy take a 2–0 lead after 13 minutes, giving LA a four-goal lead on aggregate. The Earthquakes rallied to score five goals and win in what is considered by some to be the greatest comeback in MLS history. and advance to the conference final where San Jose matched up with Kansas City. Mullan scored once as the Quakes beat the Wizards 3–2 to advance to MLS Cup. Mullan had one assist in the final as San Jose beat the Chicago Fire 4–2 to win MLS Cup 2003.

The Earthquakes began the 2004 season on March 17, losing 3–0 to Alajuelense in the CONCACAF Champions' Cup. Mullan would score once in the return leg, but Alajuelense advanced 3–1 on aggregate. He scored his first league goal of the year on May 22 in a 4–2 win over the Galaxy. On August 7, Mullan had one goal and one assist as San Jose beat D.C. United 2–0, a performance that saw Mullan named MLS Player of the Week. Mullan enjoyed another productive regular season in 2004, playing 28 games (all starts) and recording 3 goals and 8 assists. The season was a disappointment for the Earthquakes, finishing 4th in the west and qualifying for the playoffs by just two points. San Jose faced off with the Kansas City Wizards in the playoffs. Mullan played every minute of the two legs as KC advanced 3–2 on aggregate. Mullan also made three appearances in the Open Cup, helping the Earthquakes reach the semifinal.

"If I had 11 Brian Mullans on the team, I'd win the MLS Cup every year."

— Dominic Kinnear, Mullan's head coach for two seasons in San Jose and five seasons in Houston.

The 2005 season got underway for San Jose and Mullan on April 2 with a 2–2 draw with the New England Revolution. On May 14, Mullan suffered an ankle injury in a 0–0 draw with FC Dallas. On June 29, Mullan returned to the lineup after missing seven games and had the game winning assist after setting up Dwayne De Rosario in the 88th minute, giving San Jose a 1–0 win over the Colorado Rapids. He scored his first goal of the season on July 2 in a 2–2 draw with Dallas. On October 15, Mullan scored once and had one assist to give the Quakes a 3–1 win over the Los Angeles Galaxy in the final match of the regular season. He had 3 goals and 6 assists from 25 regular season appearances as he helped the Earthquakes win their first Supporters' Shield in club history. In the playoffs, Mullan played in both legs of the first round against the Galaxy and had one assist, but Los Angeles would advance 4–2 on aggregate. He also made two appearances and scored one goal in the Open Cup during the season.

=== Houston Dynamo ===
Ahead of the 2006 season, the Earthquakes franchise and players moved to Houston, Texas and rebranded as the Houston Dynamo. On April 2, 2006, Mullan recorded two assists to help Houston beat the Colorado Rapids 5–2 in the inaugural game in Dynamo history. On June 17 he had a goal and an assist to give the Dynamo a 2–1 win over Real Salt Lake. Mullan finished the regular season with 31 appearances, 2 goals, 4 assists, helping the Dynamo finish 2nd in the Western Conference. In the first leg of the conference semifinals, Mullan had one assist in a 2–1 Dynamo loss. Houston would recover in the second leg to win 3–2 on aggregate. Mullan had a goal and an assist in the conference final, helping Houston to a 3–1 win over Colorado and advance to MLS Cup 2006. In the final, Houston and the New England Revolution battled to a 0–0 draw during the first 90 minutes. In the 113th minute, Taylor Twellman broke the deadlock to give the Revs the lead. About 10 seconds after the ensuing kickoff, Mullan received the ball on the right wing and whipped in a cross that Brian Ching headed into the goal to level the score at one. The Dynamo would go on to win the game on penalties. In the 2006 U.S. Open Cup, Mullan made two appearances and had one assist to help the Dynamo reach the semifinals, where they fell to the Los Angeles Galaxy 3–1.

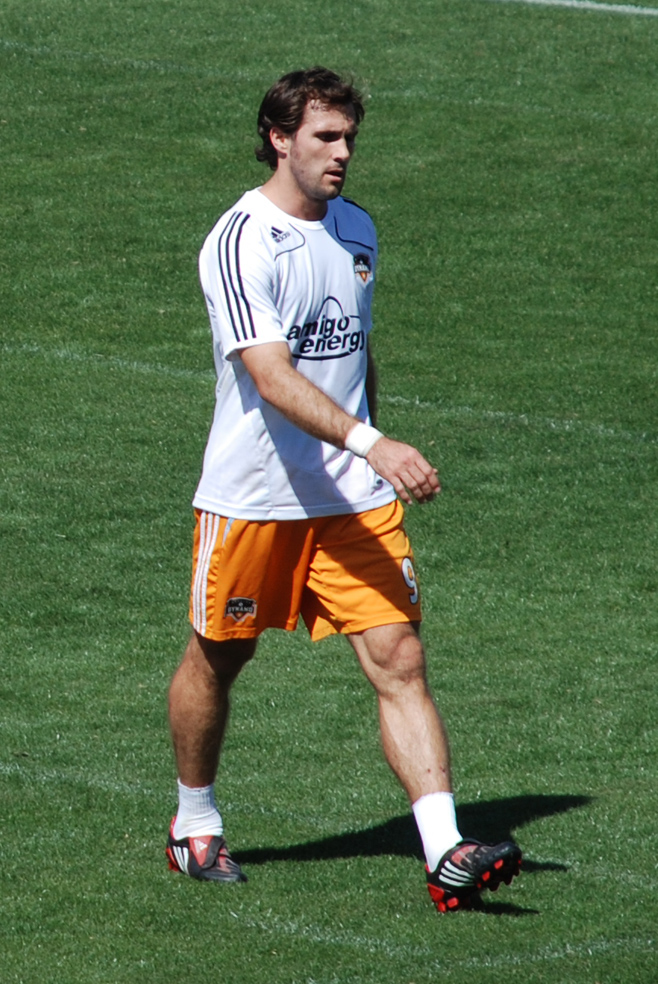
Mullan at a Dynamo training session in 2008.

The Dynamo opened the 2007 season on February 21 with a 1–0 loss to Puntarenas F.C. in the CONCACAF Champions' Cup. Mullan and the Dynamo would recover in the second leg, winning 2–0 to advance to the semifinals. Houston beat C.F. Pachuca 2–0 at home in leg one of the semifinals. Mullan got on the scoresheet in the second leg, but Houston lost 5–2 in extra time. The Dynamo opened MLS play on April 8 with a 0–0 draw against the Los Angeles Galaxy. On June 21, Mullan scored once to help the Dynamo to a 4–0 win over Chivas USA. Mullan suffered a facial fracture during a 0–0 draw with Toronto FC on July 15. He returned to the field on July 25 during a 1–0 win over Club América in the North American SuperLiga. Mullan made three appearances and scored once during the SuperLiga as the Dynamo reached the semifinals, where they lost to Pachuca on penalties. Mullan ended the regular season with 1 goal and 3 assists from 28 appearances, helping the Dynamo to a 2nd-place finish in the Western Conference. Mullan played every minute of Houston's playoff run as they returned to MLS Cup, where they beat New England again, this time by a score of 2–1. After the season, Mullan was voted Dynamo Team Co-MVP along with goalkeeper Pat Onstad in honor of their good performances throughout the year.

Ahead of the 2008 season, Mullan signed a new contract with the Dynamo. He also had an offseason surgery to repair the meniscus in his left knee. The Dynamo opened the 2008 season in the 2008 CONCACAF Champions' Cup, with Mullan appearing three times in the tournament as Houston reached the semifinal, where they lost 3–0 on aggregate to Deportivo Saprissa. On April 19 Mullan recorded his first assist of the season in a 2–2 draw with the Los Angeles Galaxy. In the opening game of the 2008 North American SuperLiga group, Mullan had a goal and an assist as Houston beat Atlante F.C. 4–0. Mullan played in each game of the tournament and had one goal and two assists as he helped the Dynamo reach the final, where they lost to New England on penalties. On July 23, Mullan scored his first league goal of the season in a 2–0 win over D.C. United. He had a goal and an assist on August 16 to help the Dynamo beat Real Salt Lake 4–3. He finished the regular season with 3 goals and 5 assists from 30 appearances, helping the Dynamo to a first-place finish and a second-place finish overall, six points off the Supporters' Shield. Houston faced off with the New York Red Bulls in the first round of the playoffs. Despite Mullan starting both legs, the Red Bulls won 4–1 on aggregate. In the group stage for the 2008–09 CONCACAF Champions League, Mullan made four appearances and had one assist, helping Houston finish 2nd in the group.

Mullan and the Dynamo opened the 2009 season on February 24 with a 1–1 draw against Atlante in the 2008–09 CONCACAF Champions League quarterfinals. Houston would lose the second leg 3–0. He picked up his first assist of the season on June 13 to help Houston to a 3–1 win over FC Dallas. In their next game, Mullan set up Brian Ching in the 89th minute to give Houston a 1–1 with Real Salt Lake. On July 21, Mullan suffered an ankle injury during a 2–1 loss to Seattle Sounders FC in the U.S. Open Cup semifinal. Mullan made three appearances and had one assist during the tournament. He returned to the field on August 15, coming off the bench in a scoreless draw with Real Salt Lake. Mullan made 25 appearances and had 4 assists during the regular season, helping Houston finish second in the Western Conference and third overall, one point behind Supporters' Shield winners Columbus Crew. Mullan started every game of the Dynamo's playoff run, helping them reach the conference finals, where they lost to the Galaxy 2–0 He made five appearances and had one assist during the group stage for the 2009–10 CONCACAF Champions League as Houston finished 3rd in their group, missing out on the knockout rounds. After the season, Mullan had a surgery to remove bone spurs and loose bodies in his right ankle.

Mullan scored his first goal of the 2010 season on May 1 in a 3–0 win over the Kansas City Wizards. On July 31, Mullan scored in the 90th minute to give a 2–2 draw with the New York Red Bulls. On September 5, in what ended up being his final game for the Dynamo, Mullan recorded an assist in a 2–1 loss to the San Jose Earthquakes. He had 3 goals and 3 assists in 22 league games in his last season in Houston. With the Dynamo struggling in the league, having the second fewest points in MLS at the time, combined with Mullan and his wife wanting to move back home to Colorado to be closer to family, Mullan approached Dynamo coach Dominic Kinnear about being traded to the Colorado Rapids. At the time of the trade, Mullan's 184 games played was the most in Dynamo history, although it now ranks 8th.

=== Colorado Rapids ===
On September 15, 2010, Mullan was traded along with a fourth-round pick in the 2013 MLS SuperDraft (later converted to a pick in the 2013 MLS Supplemental Draft) to the Colorado Rapids in exchange for Colin Clark and allocation money. He made his Rapids debut on September 18, getting the start in a 3–0 win over the New England Revolution. In the seven remaining regular season games after the trade, Mullan had two assists as he helped the Rapids pick up three wins and three draws, qualifying for the playoffs for the first time since 2006. Matched up with the Columbus Crew in the first round, Mullan had an assist in the first leg to help the Rapids earn a 1–0 win. The Rapids would lose the second leg 2–1, tying the aggregate score. With no away goals rule in place, the game went to penalty kicks, which Colorado won 5–4. The conference finals saw the Rapids come up against the San Jose Earthquakes, with Colorado winning 1–0 to advance to their first MLS Cup final since 1997. Mullan played all 120 minutes of the final, helping the Rapids beat FC Dallas 2–1 in extratime to win their first MLS Cup in franchise history. The victory made Mullan the second player in MLS history to win at least five MLS Cups, the first being his former Earthquake teammate Jeff Agoos. The list of players with five MLS Cup wins has since been joined by Todd Dunivant and Landon Donovan, both teammates of Mullan's from San Jose, with Donovan being the only player in MLS history with six wins.

On April 22, 2011, The Rapids were facing Seattle Sounders FC. In the third minute, Mullan had the ball taken off him by Sounders winger Steve Zakuani. Mullan, who felt he had been fouled by Sounders defender Tyson Wahl on the play, got up frustrated and chased Zakuani down. Mullan went in with a hard and reckless tackle, breaking the tibia and fibula in Zakuani's right leg. Mullan was shown a red card, while Zakuani was stretchered off and was rushed to the hospital. After the game Mullan was quoted as saying "I'm sorry for Steve. It was never my intention to injure him in the least. It was a tackle that I've done hundreds of times, and I'd probably do it again." Seattle coach Sigi Schmid, who had coached Mullan with the Los Angeles Galaxy, defended Mullan in the post game interview, saying the injury was never Mullan's intent. Mullan issued a formal apology on April 27, saying "It is with regret that my tackle resulted in the injury of Steve and I am deeply sorry to Steve and all those impacted by his injury." Mullan took time off of practice and sought counselling over the incident. On April 28, it was announced that Mullan would be given a nine-game suspension, on top of the automatic one-game suspension for the red card, as well as a fine. The 10-game suspension is the longest in league history for an on-field tackle, however some fans and media felt the suspension was too short. The Rapids originally wanted to appeal the suspension, but Mullan refused to appeal. He returned from the suspension on June 26, playing 67 minutes in a 4–1 loss to the Columbus Crew. On August 5, Mullan scored his first goal for the Rapids, helping them to a 2–0 win against Columbus. Mullan made 22 appearances and had 1 goal and assist during the regular season, helping Colorado qualify for the playoffs. In the first round of the playoffs, Mullan had an assist to give the Rapids a 1–0 win over Columbus. Mullan played every minute of the conference semifinals against Sporting Kansas City, but SKC won each leg 2–0. Mullan also made three appearances and scored one goal during the group stage of the 2011–12 CONCACAF Champions League. Mullan signed a multi-year contract extension with Colorado on December 5, 2011.

Mullan recorded his first assist of the 2012 season on April 1, helping Colorado get a 2–0 win against the Chicago Fire. On April 14, 2012, the Rapids lost 1–0 at the Seattle Sounders. It was Mullan's first game in Seattle since he had injured Steve Zakuani in 2011 and Sounders fans booed him every time he touched the ball. On May 6, Mullan had two assists as the Rapids beat FC Dallas 2–0. He scored his first goal of the season on June 20 in a 2–1 loss to the Earthquakes. On July 7, Mullan and the Rapids visited the Sounders, losing 2–1. During the game, Zakuani made his return from injury, coming on as a late substitute. After the match Mullan and Zakuani swapped jerseys and hugged each other. Zakuani said after the game "I forgave him a long time ago, but I think it is good for the public to see, for closure." On August 4, Mullan played in his 300th MLS regular season game as the Rapids beat Real Salt Lake 1–0. He underwent knee surgery on October 18, causing him to miss the final two games of the regular season. Mullan ended the season with 2 goals and 7 assists from 28 regular appearances. He had been dealing with pain in his knee throughout the season and with the Rapids already eliminated from the playoffs, Colorado and Mullan went ahead with the surgery. It was the first time Mullan had missed out on the playoffs during his MLS career.

"Brian is exactly the type of player that you want on your team, since he gives everything he has on the field and is a great professional off of it."

— Paul Bravo, Technical director for the Rapids from 2009 to 2016.

At the start of the 2013 season, Rapids coach Óscar Pareja converted Mullan to a left-back. He played there for the first four games of the season before being switched to a right-back. Mullan did not appear during the final three months of the season, partly due to injuries, but also because Pareja preferred different players in that position. Mullan made 16 appearances and had 2 assists during the regular season, helping the Rapids qualify for the playoffs. However he would not appear during their one playoff game. On December 10, the Rapids declined Mullan's contract option for the 2014 season.

On January 14, 2014, Mullan signed a new contract with the Rapids. He had his right knee scoped during the offseason. Mullan retired from professional soccer at the end of the 2014 MLS season.

== International career ==
Mullan received his first cap for the United States on July 11, 2004, coming on as a substitute in the 72nd minute during a 1–1 draw with Poland in a friendly. He made his first start for the U.S. on March 9, 2005, in a 3–0 win over Colombia in a friendly. In March 2007, he earned the 3rd and 4th caps of his career, coming on as a substitute in friendlies against Ecuador and Guatemala.

== Personal life ==
Mullan was born in Mineola, New York, to Bob and Jackie Mullan, but his family moved to Littleton, Colorado, a suburb of Denver, when he was young. Mullan and his two brothers grew up playing as hockey goalkeepers, but Mullan decided to focus on soccer. Mullan began dating his wife Kersten while in high school, although they attended different high schools. She originally attended the University of North Carolina-Asheville to play soccer, but she transferred to Creighton University to be closer to Mullan. They got married in 2001 and together they have two sons. Following his retirement from pro soccer, Mullan became a nurse.

== Career statistics ==
=== Club ===
Appearances and goals by club, season and competition
Club	Season	League			Playoffs		Open Cup		CONCACAF		Total	
Club	Season	Division	Apps	Goals	Apps	Goals	Apps	Goals	Apps	Goals	Apps	Goals
Los Angeles Galaxy	2001	MLS	10	2	4	0	1	0	—		15	2
Los Angeles Galaxy	2002	MLS	21	3	4	0	3	0	—		28	3
Los Angeles Galaxy	Total		31	5	8	0	4	0	0	0	43	5
San Jose Earthquakes	2003	MLS	30	6	4	1	1	0	2 (Note: Appearances in CONCACAF Champions Cup)	0	37	7
San Jose Earthquakes	2004	MLS	28	3	2	0	3	0	2	1	35	4
San Jose Earthquakes	2005	MLS	25	3	2	0	2	1	—		29	4
San Jose Earthquakes	Total		83	12	8	1	6	1	4	1	101	15
Houston Dynamo	2006	MLS	31	2	4	1	2	0	—		37	3
Houston Dynamo	2007	MLS	28	1	4	0	1	0	7 (Note: Four appearances and one goal in CONCACAF Champions' Cup, three appearances North American SuperLiga)	1	40	2
Houston Dynamo	2008	MLS	30	3	2	0	0	0	12 (Note: Three appearances in 2008 CONCACAF Champions' Cup, five appearances and one goal in 2008 North American SuperLiga, four appearances in 2008–09 CONCACAF Champions League)	1	44	4
Houston Dynamo	2009	MLS	25	0	3	0	3	0	7 (Note: Two appearances in 2008–09 CONCACAF Champions League, five appearances 2009–10 CONCACAF Champions League)	0	38	0
Houston Dynamo	2010	MLS	22	3	—		0	0	3 (Note: Appearances in North American SuperLiga)	0	25	3
Houston Dynamo	Total		136	9	13	1	6	0	29	2	184	12
Colorado Rapids	2010	MLS	7	0	4	0	0	0	—		11	0
Colorado Rapids	2011	MLS	22	1	3	0	0	0	3 (Note: Appearances in 2011–12 CONCACAF Champions League)	1	28	2
Colorado Rapids	2012	MLS	28	2	—		0	0	—		28	2
Colorado Rapids	2013	MLS	16	0	0	0	0	0	—		16	0
Colorado Rapids	2014	MLS	0	0	—		0	0	—		0	0
Colorado Rapids	Total		73	3	7	0	0	0	3	1	83	4
Career total			323	29	36	2	16	1	36	4	411	36

== Honors ==
Creighton Bluejays

- Missouri Valley Conference Men's Soccer Tournament: 1997, 1998, 2000

Los Angeles Galaxy

- Lamar Hunt U.S. Open Cup: 2001
- MLS Cup: 2002
- Supporters' Shield: 2002
- MLS Western Conference Championship: 2001, 2002

San Jose Earthquakes

- MLS Cup: 2003
- Supporters' Shield: 2005
- MLS Western Conference Championship: 2003

Houston Dynamo

- MLS Cup: 2006, 2007
- MLS Western Conference Championship: 2006, 2007

Colorado Rapids

- MLS Cup: 2010
- MLS Eastern Conference Championship: 2010

Individual

- Houston Dynamo Team MVP: 2007
