= Danny Califf =

American soccer player (born 1980)

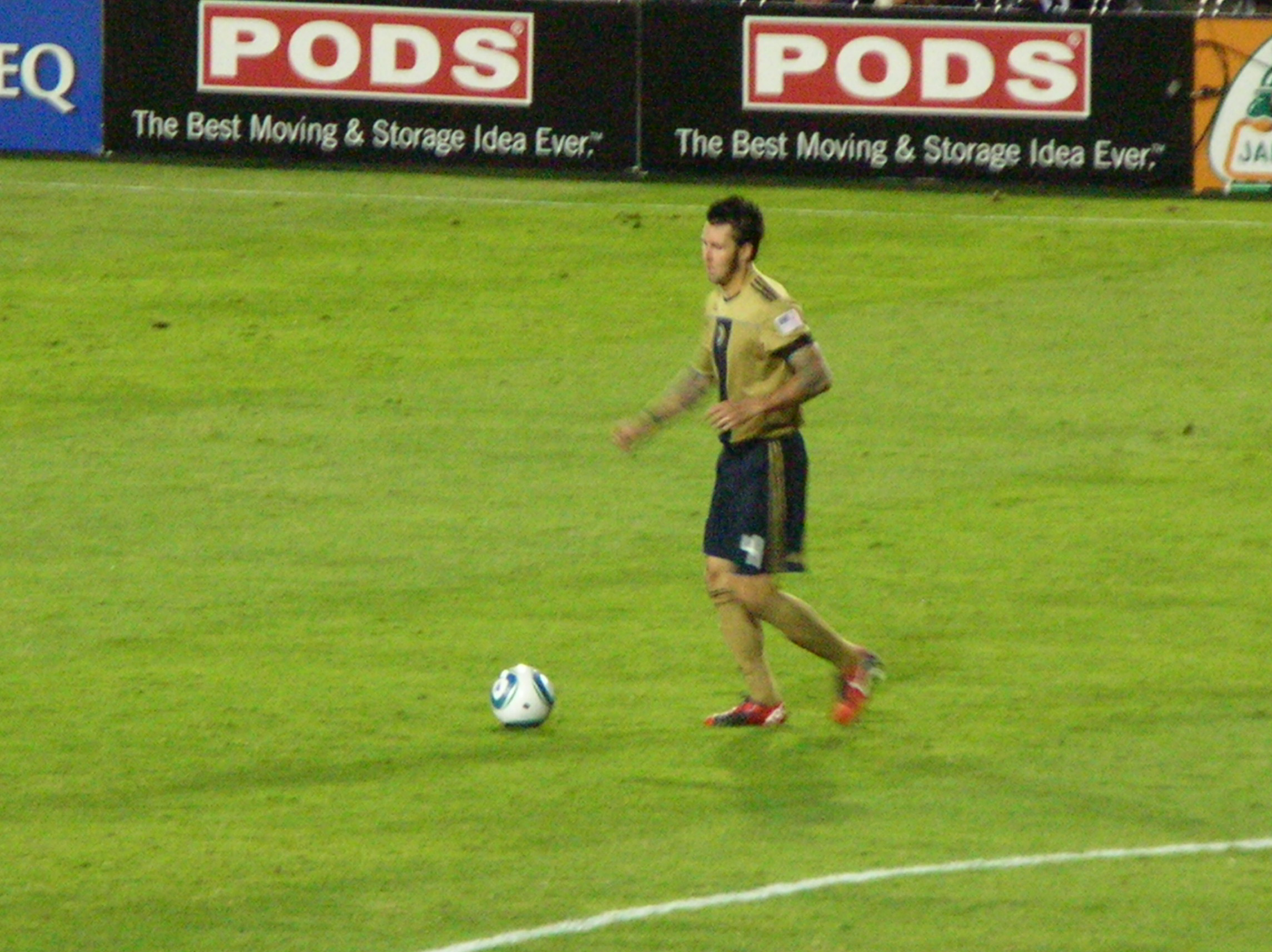
- Califf with Philadelphia Union in 2010

Personal information
- Full name: Daniel Benjamin Califf
- Date of birth: March 17, 1980 (age 46)
- Place of birth: Montclair, California, United States
- Height: 6 ft 1 in (1.85 m)
- Position: Defender

College career
Years	Team	Apps	(Gls)
1998–1999	Maryland Terrapins		

Senior career*
Years	Team	Apps	(Gls)
2000–2004	Los Angeles Galaxy	103	(5)
2000	→ MLS Pro-40 (loan)	2	(0)
2005	San Jose Earthquakes	20	(2)
2006–2008	AaB	69	(2)
2008–2009	Midtjylland	31	(1)
2010–2012	Philadelphia Union	65	(1)
2012	Chivas USA	19	(1)
2013	Toronto FC	4	(0)
Total		313	(12)

International career
1997	United States U17	3	(0)
1999	United States U20	4	(1)
2000	United States U23	6	(1)
2002–2010	United States	26	(1)
Medal record
Representing United States
FIFA Confederations Cup
Runner-up	2009 South Africa	Team
CONCACAF Gold Cup
Winner	CONCACAF Gold Cup	2002
Third place	CONCACAF Gold Cup	2003
Men's Soccer
- * Club domestic league appearances and goals

Daniel Benjamin Califf (born March 17, 1980) is an American retired professional soccer player who played as a defender.

== Youth and college career ==
Califf (pronounced kāl'ĭ-f) was born in Orange, California. He started his youth career in soccer for Canyon Hills Soccer Association, playing on the Canyon Classic team coached by his father. He played college soccer at the University of Maryland from 1998 to 2000. As a freshman, he started all 24 of the team's games, and was named to the Soccer America All-Freshman team for helping to lead the Terrapins to the Final Four. In his second year of college, he started 20 games, and was named an NSCAA third-team All-American.

== Club career ==
After his sophomore season, Califf signed a Project-40 contract with MLS and entered the 2000 MLS SuperDraft, where he was selected sixth overall by the Los Angeles Galaxy. Califf was immediately slotted into the Galaxy's starting line up, appearing in 18 games, 16 of them starts, as a rookie. Over the next three years, Califf would establish himself as one of the best central defenders in the league, starting 69 games for the Galaxy while helping the team to win a U.S. Open Cup in 2001 and a MLS Cup in 2002. Califf struggled with injuries in 2004, and was able to make only 10 starts, playing 855 minutes.

Califf was traded to the San Jose Earthquakes for an allocation prior to the 2005 season. He then regained his old form and even improved, being named to the MLS Best XI for the first time. Califf has scored seven league goals and four assists in six years in MLS.

He left the Quakes after just one season to sign with Aalborg in the Danish Superliga. In his first full season at Aalborg, Califf played 30 of 33 games, and helped the team win bronze medals in the 2006–07 Superliga season. Califf scored his first Aalborg goal on the last match day of the season, as bronze medal contenders Odense BK were defeated 3–1. After the season, during AaB's Intertoto Cup campaign, Califf was named club captain. In the 2007–08 Superliga season he helped Aalborg to a gold medal but after the season he could not agree with Aalborg on a new contract. He eventually signed with Danish Superliga rivals Midtjylland.

On December 3, 2009, the Philadelphia Union announced that they had acquired Califf's MLS rights from Houston Dynamo and that he would join the team for their inaugural 2010 season. Before the Union's first game against Seattle Sounders FC he was announced as the team's captain. Califf scored his first goal for the Union in the 2011 MLS season opener win against Houston Dynamo on March 19, 2011. He was named to the MLS Team of the week for this performance that match also. On June 8, Califf was named a nominee for the MLS All-Star Game. It was announced that he was fifth in defender voting for the All-Star Game.

On May 17, 2012, Califf was traded to Chivas USA for Michael Lahoud and allocation money. At the end of the 2012 season, Chivas USA declined Califf's contract option and he entered the 2012 MLS Re-Entry Draft. On December 14, 2012, Califf was selected by Toronto FC with the first pick of stage two of the draft and that day signed a contract with Toronto for the 2013 season.

=== Retirement ===
Califf announced his retirement from soccer on July 12, 2013.

In 2014, Califf became an assistant coach under Charlie Dodds, President of YSC Sports, home of the Philadelphia Union Academy. After one year of coaching at YSC Sports, he returned to Toronto FC as a scout through 2016.

Califf has settled back in his hometown of Orange, CA with his family. Currently, he is the Founder and President of his own personal training company, Professional Soccer Resource (PSR) and holds the title of Technical Director for the youth soccer club Boca O.C.

== International career ==
Califf has played for the United States national team at every level from the U-17's to the senior team. He has appeared in the 1997 FIFA U-17 World Championship, the 1999 World Youth Championship in Egypt, and the 2000 Sydney Olympics . Additionally, he has appeared in 26 games for the full national team, getting his first cap against South Korea on January 19, 2002.

Califf played in the 2003 & 2009 Confederations Cup, the 2002, 2003, & 2009 Gold Cups and the 2007 Copa America.

He served as captain twice for the team on July 5, 2007, when the United States lost 1–0 to Colombia during their final group game in Venezuela (2007 Copa America) and again in 2009 With a win against Sweden in Carson, CA.

== Career statistics ==
=== Club ===
As of July 12, 2013

Appearances and goals by club, season and competition
Club	Season	League			National cup (Note: Includes U.S. Open Cup, Danish Cup, Canadian Championship.)		League cup (Note: Includes MLS Cup Playoffs, Royal League, Viasat Cup.)		Continental		Total	
Club	Season	Division	Apps	Goals	Apps	Goals	Apps	Goals	Apps	Goals	Apps	Goals
Los Angeles Galaxy	2000	MLS	18	1	4	0	2	1	0	0	24	2
Los Angeles Galaxy	2001	MLS	24	3	5	0	6	1	–		35	4
Los Angeles Galaxy	2002	MLS	25	1	3	0	6	1	–		34	2
Los Angeles Galaxy	2003	MLS	23	0	3	0	2	0			28	0
Los Angeles Galaxy	2004	MLS	13	0	0	0	3	0	–		16	2
Los Angeles Galaxy	Total		103	5	15	0	19	3	0	0	137	8
San Jose Earthquakes	2005	MLS	20	2	2	0	1	0	–		23	2
Aalborg BK	2005–06	Danish Superliga	9	0			–		–			
Aalborg BK	2006–07	Danish Superliga	30	1			–		–			
Aalborg BK	2007–08	Danish Superliga	30	1			–		11	1	41	2
Aalborg BK	Total		69	2	5	0	10	0	11	1	95	3
FC Midtjylland	2008–09	Danish Superliga	26	1	0	0	–		3	0	29	1
FC Midtjylland	2009–10	Danish Superliga	5	0	0	0	–		0	0	5	0
FC Midtjylland	Total		31	1	0	0	0	0	3	0	34	1
Philadelphia Union	2010	MLS	28	0	1	0	0	0	0	0	29	0
Philadelphia Union	2011	MLS	33	1	1	0	2	0	0	0	36	1
Philadelphia Union	2012	MLS	4	0	0	0	0	0	0	0	4	0
Philadelphia Union	Total		65	1	2	0	2	0	0	0	69	1
Chivas USA	2012	MLS	19	1	3	0	0	0	–		22	1
Toronto FC	2013	MLS	4	0	2	0	–		–		6	0
Career otal			311	12	29	0	32	3	14	1	386	16

=== International ===
He scored his only international goal against Haiti on March 16, 2004.

#	Date	Venue	Opponent	Score	Result	Competition
1.	March 16, 2004	Miami, Florida	Haiti	0–1	1–1	Friendly match

== Honors ==
Los Angeles Galaxy

- CONCACAF Champions Cup: 2000
- Defender of the Year: 2000
- Lamar Hunt U.S. Open Cup: 2001
- Major League Soccer MLS Cup: 2002
- Major League Soccer Supporters' Shield: 2002
- Major League Soccer Western Conference Championship: 2002

San Jose Earthquakes

- Major League Soccer Supporters' Shield: 2005
- MLS BEST XI: 2005
- MLS ALL-STAR: 2005

Aalborg

- Danish Superliga: 2007–08

United States

- CONCACAF Gold Cup: 2002, 2003, 2005

Individual

- MLS Best XI: 2005
- MLS All-Star: 2005
