= 2000 CONCACAF Champions' Cup =

36th edition of premier club football tournament organized by CONCACAF

Tournament details
- Host country: United States
- City: Los Angeles
- Dates: January 16, 2001 – January 21, 2001
- Teams: 8 (from 5 associations)

Final positions
- Champions: (United States) Los Angeles Galaxy (1st title)
- Runners-up: (Honduras) Olimpia
- Third place: (Mexico) Pachuca
- Fourth place: (United States) D.C. United

Tournament statistics
- Matches played: 8
- Goals scored: 19 (2.38 per match)
- Top scorer(s): (Brazil) Denilson Costa (United States) Carey Talley (3 goals)

The 2000 CONCACAF Champions' Cup was the 36th edition of the annual international club football competition held in the CONCACAF region (North America, Central America and the Caribbean), the CONCACAF Champions' Cup. It determined that year's club champion of association football in the CONCACAF region.

The tournament was played in Los Angeles, California, and won by the Los Angeles Galaxy over Olimpia in the final match. This was also the last win by an MLS team in CONCACAF's premier club competition, until Seattle Sounders FC won the 2022 CONCACAF Champions League.

== Qualified teams ==
=== North American zone ===
- Major League Soccer:
  (United States) D.C. United - 1999 MLS Cup winner
  (United States) Los Angeles Galaxy - 1999 MLS Cup runner-up
- Primera División de México:
  (Mexico) Pachuca - 1999 Invierno winner
  (Mexico) Toluca - 2000 Verano winner

=== Central American zone ===
- 2000 UNCAF Interclub Cup:
  (Honduras) Olimpia - Central Zone final round first place
  (Costa Rica) Alajuelense - Central Zone final round second place
  (Honduras) Real España - Central Zone final round third place

=== Caribbean zone ===
- 2000 CFU Club Championship:
  (Trinidad and Tobago) Joe Public - Caribbean Zone winner

== Bracket ==
Quarterfinals
(United States) Los Angeles Galaxy (p)	0 (5)
(Honduras) Real España	0 (3)
(United States) D.C. United	2
(Costa Rica) Alajuelense	1
(Mexico) Toluca	0
(Honduras) Olimpia	1
(Mexico) Pachuca	1
(Trinidad and Tobago) Joe Public	0

Semifinals
(United States) Los Angeles Galaxy (p)	1 (4)
(United States) D.C. United	1 (2)
(Honduras) Olimpia	4
(Mexico) Pachuca	0

Finals
(United States) Los Angeles Galaxy	3
(Honduras) Olimpia	2
Third place
(United States) D.C. United	1
(Mexico) Pachuca	2

== Quarterfinals ==
16 January 2001

Toluca (Mexico)	0–1	(Honduras) Olimpia
		Lima 86'

Titan Stadium, Fullerton, United States

16 January 2001

Pachuca (Mexico)	1–0	(Trinidad and Tobago) Joe Public
Caballero 72' (pen.)

Titan Stadium, Fullerton, United States

17 January 2001

D.C. United (United States)	2–1	(Costa Rica) Alajuelense
Talley 15'; Olsen 90'		74' (pen.) Arnáez

Titan Stadium, Fullerton, United States

17 January 2001

LA Galaxy (United States)	0–0	(Honduras) Real España
Penalties
	5–3

Titan Stadium, Fullerton, United States

== Semifinals ==
19 January 2001

Olimpia (Honduras)	4–0	(Mexico) Pachuca
Costa 35' 57' 77'; Pineda 49'

Los Angeles Memorial Coliseum, Los Angeles, United States
Attendance: 7,475

19 January 2001

LA Galaxy (United States)	1–1	(United States) D.C. United
Vanney 29' (pen.)		48' (pen.) Etcheverry
Penalties
Vanney (penalty scored); Elliott (penalty scored); Vagenas (penalty scored); Cienfuegos (penalty scored)	4–2	(penalty scored) Talley; (penalty scored) Agoos

Los Angeles Memorial Coliseum, Los Angeles, United States
Attendance: 7,475

== Third place match ==
21 January 2001

D.C. United (United States)	1–2	(Mexico) Pachuca
Talley 33'		14' Pineda; 38' Arellano

Los Angeles Memorial Coliseum, Los Angeles, United States

== Final ==
21 January 2001

LA Galaxy (United States)	3–2	(Honduras) Olimpia
Hendrickson 36', 78'; Jones 39'	Report	34' (pen.) Tosello; 51' de Lima

Los Angeles Memorial Coliseum, Los Angeles, United States
Attendance: 8,147
Referee: Peter Pendergast

Team details

Los Angeles Galaxy	Olimpia

GK	22	(United States) Kevin Hartman
DF	3	(United States) Greg Vanney
DF	30	(United States) Alexi Lalas
DF	20	(United States) Paul Caligiuri
DF	7	(United States) Zak Ibsen
MF	17	(Saint Vincent and the Grenadines) Ezra Hendrickson
MF		(New Zealand) Simon Elliott
MF		(United States) Peter Vagenas
MF	10	(El Salvador) Mauricio Cienfuegos	(substituted off) 90'
FW	13	(United States) Cobi Jones
FW		(United States) Adam Frye	(substituted off) 60'
Substitutions:
MF	11	(United States) Sasha Victorine	(substituted on) 60'
MF	5	(United States) Brian Kelly	(substituted on) 90'
Manager:
(Germany) Sigi Schmid

GK	(Panama) Donaldo González
DF	(Honduras) Gerson Vázquez
DF	(Uruguay) Robert Lima
DF	(Honduras) Samuel Caballero
DF	(Honduras) Nerlin Membreño
MF	(Honduras) Alex Pineda	(substituted off) 82'
MF	(Argentina) Danilo Tosello
MF	(Honduras) José Luis Pineda	(substituted off) 88'
MF	(Honduras) Christian Santamaría
FW	(Brazil) (Honduras) Denilson Costa
FW	(Honduras) Carlos Paes
Substitutes:
DF	(Honduras) Arnold Cruz	(substituted on) 82'
MF	(Honduras) Reynaldo Tilguath	(substituted on) 88'
Manager:
(Honduras) Edwin Pavón

- LA Galaxy and Olimpia qualify for the 2001 FIFA Club World Championship.

== Champion ==
CONCACAF Champions' Cup
2000 Winners

Los Angeles Galaxy
First Title
