= Marvin Quijano =

Salvadoran footballer (born 1979)

Personal information
- Full name: Marvin Quijano
- Date of birth: October 10, 1979 (age 47)
- Place of birth: San Salvador, El Salvador
- Height: 5 ft 9 in (1.75 m)
- Positions: Midfielder; striker

Youth career
- 1998: Rio Hondo College

Senior career*
| Years | Team | Apps | (Gls) |
| 1999–2001 | Los Angeles Galaxy | 32 | (4) |
| 1999 | → MLS Pro-40 (loan) | 18 | (2) |
| 2000 | → MLS Pro-40 (loan) | 18 | (10) |
| 2002–2003 | Colorado Rapids | 6 | (0) |
- * Club domestic league appearances and goals

Marvin Quijano (born October 10, 1979, in San Salvador, El Salvador) is a former Salvadoran football (soccer) player who last played midfield for Colorado Rapids of Major League Soccer.

== Beginning ==
Marvin Quijano began his soccer career playing for Rio Hondo College in 1998. During this season, he impressed the coaching staff with his technical brilliance and talents. Quijano had an extremely successful season, scoring 24 goals in 30 games and winning every award possible (including American Selections 1998, Far West East Player of the Year 1998, and Rio Honda Player of the Year Award 1998). Quijano was part of the Project 40 program.

== L.A. Galaxy ==
Marvin Quijano decided to try out for the Los Angeles Galaxy roster after showing impressive skills and talent and was signed up in 1999. Quijano played alongside fellow Salvadoran Mauricio Cienfuegos between 1999 and 2001 with 32 games and 4 goals. Quijano achieved three medals and achievements with the 2000 CONCACAF Champions Cup, 2001 US Open Cup 2001, and 2001 MLS Supporters' Shield. The Galaxy released him at the end of the 2001 season.

== Colorado Rapids ==
Marvin Quijano impressed Colorado Rapids coach Tim Hankinson. They agreed to a deal for two years between 2002 and 2003; however, Marvin's experience was an unhappy one, playing six games in 2002 and playing no games in 2003. He was released.

== Recent activities ==
Marvin Quijano was appointed head coach for the Denver Soccer Club, a semi-professional club, in 2006. He was appointed as the youth coach of Colorado Rapids.
