= Sasha Victorine =

American soccer player (born 1978)

Personal information
- Full name: Sasha Caleb Victorine
- Date of birth: February 3, 1978 (age 48)
- Place of birth: Santa Ana, California, United States
- Height: 6 ft 2 in (1.88 m)
- Position: Midfielder

College career
Years	Team	Apps	(Gls)
1996–1999	UCLA Bruins		

Senior career*
Years	Team	Apps	(Gls)
2000–2004	Los Angeles Galaxy	121	(17)
2005–2008	Kansas City Wizards	106	(12)
2008–2009	Chivas USA	12	(2)
Total		239	(31)

International career
2000–2003	United States	4	(1)
- * Club domestic league appearances and goals

Sasha Caleb Victorine (born February 3, 1978) is an American former soccer player.

He spent his entire professional career in Major League Soccer in the United States, making over 100 appearances for both Los Angeles Galaxy and Kansas City Wizards, before finishing his career with Chivas USA. He also made four appearances and scored one goal for the United States national team, and represented his country at the 2000 Summer Olympics.

== Career ==
=== Youth and college ===
Victorine was born in Santa Ana, California. He played high school soccer at Rio Americano High School, and college soccer at UCLA, leading them to the NCAA title in 1997, and being named a first-team All-American in 1999. He was drafted by the Los Angeles Galaxy in the first round of the 2000 MLS SuperDraft.

=== Professional ===
Victorine spent five years with LA, winning the U.S. Open Cup in 2001 and the MLS Cup in 2002; his best season was 2001, when he scored seven goals and five assists. He was traded to Kansas City Wizards for a draft pick in 2005. Alternating between the attack and midfield, in six years in MLS, he scored 24 goals and 24 assists, adding four goals and two assists in the playoffs. Victorine was traded to Chivas USA on September 15, 2008, in return for allocation money. Throughout his career at UCLA, the Galaxy, and the US Olympic and national teams, Victorine was teammates with Peter Vagenas. The two Californians were born just four days apart.

He retired from professional soccer in March 2010. He later worked in the Kansas City Wizards front office and also served as a color commentator on KCWE television station. He has since left his roles with the club and now works in the private sector outside of sports.

=== International ===
Victorine played for the United States in the 1999 Pan American Games and the 2000 Summer Olympics. He earned his first cap for the senior national team on October 25, 2000, against Mexico, and earned four caps total, scoring one goal. An attacking player for most of his career, US coach Bruce Arena played Victorine at right back.

=== Sports diplomacy ===
In November 2010, Victorine traveled to Cyprus as a SportsUnited Sports Envoy for the U.S. Department of State. In this function, he worked with Anthony Sanneh to conduct soccer clinics and events for 350 youth from underserved areas. In so doing, Victorine helped contribute to SportsUnited's mission to promote greater international understanding and inclusion through sport.
