= Isaias Bardales Jr. =

American soccer player (born 1979)

Personal information
- Full name: Isaias Bardales Jr.
- Date of birth: August 18, 1979 (age 47)
- Place of birth: San Jose, California, United States
- Height: 5 ft 11 in (1.80 m)
- Position: Forward

Team information
- Current team: California Cougars

Youth career
- 1999–2000: San Jose State Spartans

Senior career*
| Years | Team | Apps | (Gls) |
| 2001–2003 | Los Angeles Galaxy | 12 | (0) |
| 2001 | → Seattle Sounders (loan) | 2 | (0) |
| 2003 | → Syracuse Salty Dogs (loan) | 10 | (0) |
| 2004 | San Diego Gauchos | 15 | (0) |
| 2005 | Puerto Rico Islanders | 8 | (0) |
| 2006 | San Diego Gauchos | 15 | (4) |
| 2007 | San Jose Frogs | 8 | (0) |
| 2009–2011 | California Cougars | 10 | (3) |
- * Club domestic league appearances and goals as of 6 April 2009

Isaias Bardales Jr. (born August 18, 1979) is an American former soccer player.

== Career ==
=== College ===
Bardales attended Leland High School in San Jose, California and played college soccer at San Jose State University.

=== Professional ===
Bardales signed a Project-40 contract with Major League Soccer and was drafted in the first round (11th overall) in the 2001 MLS SuperDraft by Los Angeles Galaxy. He played in 12 MLS games for Galaxy in his rookie season, starting one, and scored a goal in the US Open Cup. He was sent on loan to Seattle Sounders FC and later the Syracuse Salty Dogs in the A-League, and was waived at the end of the 2003 season.

He later played in the USL Premier Development League for the San Diego Gauchos and the San Jose Frogs.

== Post-Soccer Career ==
Bardales was a forward for the California Cougars of the Professional Arena Soccer League for a time. His coaching experience began with Aptos High School Boys Varsity Soccer in Santa Cruz, CA. He later took on an Assistant Coach position for Evergreen Valley College in San Jose, California in 2008.

In 2010, he began training youth competitive soccer teams across the Bay Area, CA earning him a prestigious Bay Area Double-Goal Coach Award from Positive Coaching Alliance. As of 2021, Bardales continues to train youth competitive soccer in the Inland Empire, CA.
