= Peter Vagenas =

American soccer player (born 1978)

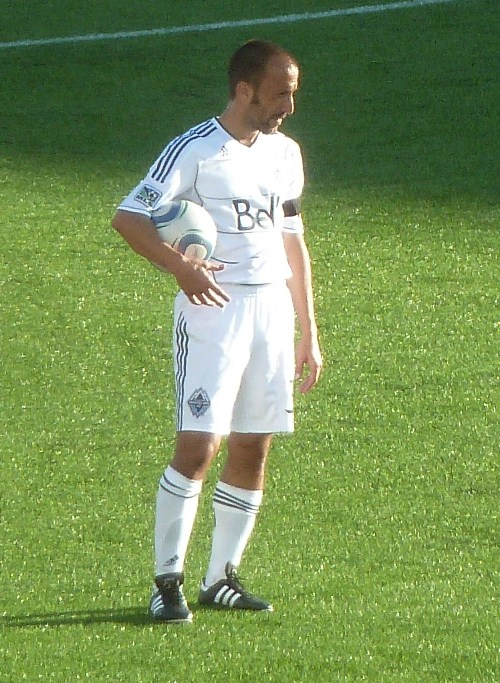

Personal information
- Full name: Panayiotis Alexiou Vagenas
- Date of birth: February 6, 1978 (age 48)
- Place of birth: Pasadena, California, United States
- Height: 5 ft 8 in (1.73 m)
- Position: Midfielder

College career
Years	Team	Apps	(Gls)
1996–1999	UCLA Bruins	82	(15)

Senior career*
Years	Team	Apps	(Gls)
2000–2008	LA Galaxy	183	(14)
2009–2010	Seattle Sounders FC	21	(0)
2011	Vancouver Whitecaps FC	16	(0)
2012	Chivas USA	13	(0)
Total		233	(14)

International career^{‡}
2000	United States U23	6	(3)
2000–2003	United States	3	(0)

Managerial career
- 2020: Shijiazhuang Ever Bright F.C. (assistant)
- * Club domestic league appearances and goals as of October 30, 2012 ‡ National team caps and goals as of April 4, 2010

Panayiotis Alexiou "Peter" Vagenas (born February 6, 1978) is an American former soccer player.

== High school and college ==
Vagenas graduated from Saint Francis High School in La Cañada Flintridge, class of 1996, where he played for coach Glen Appels and captained the team to a CIF Southern Section Championship his senior year, as well as being named CIF SS divisional player of the year. Vagenas played club soccer for Afshin Ghotbi. He played college soccer at UCLA from 1996 to 1999, leading them to the NCAA title in 1997, and finished his career there with 15 goals and 30 assists in 82 games. He was elected team MVP during his campaign at UCLA.

== Career ==
=== Professional ===
Vagenas was drafted by Los Angeles Galaxy in the second round of the 2000 MLS SuperDraft and subsequently spent nine years with the team, winning the U.S. Open Cup in 2001 and 2005, and the MLS Cup in 2002 and 2005, captaining the team to the 2005 double. Vagenas missed most of 2007 and 2008 due to injury, but during his time with Galaxy he scored 14 goals and 12 assists in 183 league appearances, plus added two goals and two assists in the playoffs. He was a fan favorite with Galaxy due to his energetic play and local roots (earning him the nickname "Pasadena Pete").

On November 26, 2008, Vagenas was selected by Seattle Sounders FC in the 2008 MLS Expansion Draft.

After two seasons with Seattle, Vagenas was traded to Colorado Rapids on November 22, 2010. After the trade Colorado declined Vagenas's contract option and he elected to participate in the 2010 MLS Re-Entry Draft.

Vagenas became a free agent in Major League Soccer when he was not selected in the Re-Entry draft; after a couple of months out of the game he signed for expansion side Vancouver Whitecaps FC in April 2011. At season's end, Vancouver declined his 2012 contract option and he entered the 2011 MLS Re-Entry Draft. Vagenas was not selected in the draft and became a free agent.

He was signed by Chivas USA on February 22, 2012. His contract expired after 2012 and he made himself eligible for the 2012 MLS Re-Entry Draft in December 2012. Vagenas became a free agent after he went undrafted in both rounds of the draft.

=== International ===
Vagenas played for the United States in the 2000 Summer Olympics, scoring three goals, all on penalty kicks. He earned his first cap for the senior national team on October 25, 2000, against Mexico, but injuries have curtailed his appearances at the international level. He has earned three caps to date. He was also the captain and leading scorer in the 1999 Pan American Games in Canada for the USA national team.

== Statistics ==
Season	Club	League	Apps.	Goals
2000	Los Angeles Galaxy	Major League Soccer	16	3
2001	Los Angeles Galaxy	Major League Soccer	26	3
2002	Los Angeles Galaxy	Major League Soccer	17	0
2003	Los Angeles Galaxy	Major League Soccer	20	0
2004	Los Angeles Galaxy	Major League Soccer	12	0
2005	Los Angeles Galaxy	Major League Soccer	29	5
2006	Los Angeles Galaxy	Major League Soccer	25	2
2007	Los Angeles Galaxy	Major League Soccer	24	0
2008	Los Angeles Galaxy	Major League Soccer	14	1
2009	Seattle Sounders FC	Major League Soccer	14	0
2010	Seattle Sounders FC	Major League Soccer	7	0
2011	Vancouver Whitecaps FC	Major League Soccer	16	0
2012	Chivas USA	Major League Soccer	1	0
Total	Last Updated: February 22, 2012		221	14

== Personal life ==
Peter was born to Alex and Tassia Vagenas. He and his three siblings, George, Theoni and Dino were raised in Pasadena, California. Vagenas now resides in Pasadena along with his wife Mindy.

== Honors ==
=== Los Angeles Galaxy ===
- CONCACAF Champions' Cup (1): 2000
- Lamar Hunt U.S. Open Cup (2): 2001, 2005
- Major League Soccer MLS Cup (2): 2002, 2005
- Major League Soccer Supporters' Shield (1): 2002
- Major League Soccer Western Conference Championship (2): 2002, 2005

=== Seattle Sounders FC ===
- Lamar Hunt U.S. Open Cup (1): 2009
