= Cobi Jones =

American soccer player (born 1970)

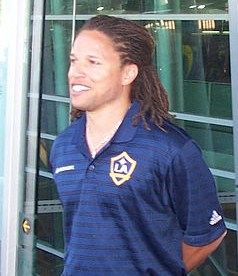
- Jones with LA Galaxy in 2007

Personal information
- Full name: Cobi N'Gai Jones
- Date of birth: June 16, 1970 (age 56)
- Place of birth: Detroit, Michigan, U.S.
- Height: 5 ft 7 in (1.70 m)
- Position: Midfielder

Youth career
- 1985–1988: Westlake Warriors

College career
Years	Team	Apps	(Gls)
1988–1991	UCLA Bruins		

Senior career*
Years	Team	Apps	(Gls)
1994–1995	Coventry City	21	(2)
1995–1996	Vasco da Gama	4	(1)
1996–2007	LA Galaxy	306	(70)
Total		334	(73)

International career
1992–2004	United States	164	(15)

Managerial career
- 2008: LA Galaxy (interim)
- 2008–2010: LA Galaxy (assistant)
Medal record
Men's soccer
Representing United States
FIFA Confederations Cup
Third place	1992 Saudi Arabia
Third place	1999 Mexico
CONCACAF Gold Cup
Winner	2002 United States
Runner-up	1993 United States–Mexico
Runner-up	1998 United States
Third place	1996 United States
Pan American Games
Gold medal – first place	1991 Havana	Team
- * Club domestic league appearances and goals

Cobi N'Gai Jones (born June 16, 1970) is an American former professional soccer player and commentator. He is an analyst for MLS Season Pass on Apple TV. He has also been seen on Time Warner Cable SportsNet, Fox Sports, BeIN Sports, the Pac-12 Network, and as the host of the Totally Football Show: American Edition. In addition, during the 1990s, he hosted the health show Mega-Dose on MTV.

As a player, Jones was a midfielder from 1994 until 2007, starting his career in England with Premier League club Coventry City, before playing for Brazilian side Vasco da Gama. He is one of a significant group of United States national team stars who returned from overseas to aid the then new Major League Soccer in 1996, beginning an 11-year spell with the LA Galaxy. Jones is the all-time leader in caps for the United States national team and a member of the National Soccer Hall of Fame.

Following retirement, Jones served as an assistant coach with the LA Galaxy for two seasons.

== Youth ==
Jones grew up in Southern California. He played soccer with AYSO starting at age 5 in Westlake Village, California. After graduating from Westlake High School, Jones emerged as a talented player in college, making the UCLA soccer team as a non-scholarship player, ultimately becoming one of its most successful soccer-playing graduates. While attending UCLA, Jones was a member of Lambda Chi Alpha, an international fraternity.

== Club career ==
After playing in the 1994 World Cup held in the United States, Jones signed with English team Coventry City of the Premier League, where he spent one season. Jones trained with a German club 1. FC Köln of the Bundesliga before joining Brazilian club Vasco da Gama after impressive performances with the United States national team in the 1995 Copa America. After only a few months in Brazil, Jones signed with the new Los Angeles Galaxy franchise for Major League Soccer's inaugural season.

Jones's best year with the Galaxy came in 1998, when he was second in MLS with 51 points (19 goals and 13 assists), was named to the MLS Best XI, and was also named U.S. Soccer Athlete of the Year. In 2005, he became the last player in MLS to remain with his original team since 1996. Jones announced on March 19, 2007, that he would retire following the season.

== International career ==
Jones is currently the all-time leader of the United States in appearances, with 164 caps as of the end of 2004 (scoring 15 goals). He played for the team in the 1994, 1998, and 2002 FIFA World Cups. He was named to the best XI at the 2000 CONCACAF Gold Cup and won with the national team at the 2002 CONCACAF Gold Cup. He also represented his country at the 1992 Summer Olympics in Barcelona. After playing in the 1995 Copa America, he also became a popular player in Latin America because the nickname used by an Argentine commentator to call him: "Escobillón" ("swab"), due to his bleached dreadlock hairstyle and the similar pronunciation of his name, Is Cobi Jones, and the word "escobillón".

== Coaching career ==
On November 9, 2007, Jones was announced as an assistant coach with the Galaxy under Ruud Gullit. After Gullit's resignation on August 11, 2008, Jones served as the interim head coach until the Galaxy hired Jones's former United States national team head coach Bruce Arena.

In January 2011, Jones left the Galaxy to serve as associate director of soccer with the New York Cosmos and was with the club through 2012.

== Personal life ==
On September 12, 2009, Jones married Kim Reese. Reese, a music consultant and former music executive at New Line Cinema, met Jones in 2003 and began dating him in 2004. The couple was married at the Four Seasons Resort Aviara in Carlsbad, California. They have two sons, Cayden and Cai.

On March 11, 2011, Jones was selected for induction into the National Soccer Hall of Fame in his first year of eligibility.

Jones is a part of the ownership group of Angel City FC of the National Women's Soccer League.

== Career statistics ==
=== Club ===
Appearances and goals by club, season and competition
Club	Season	League			National cup		League cup		Continental		Total	
Club	Season	Division	Apps	Goals	Apps	Goals	Apps	Goals	Apps	Goals	Apps	Goals
Coventry City	1994–95	Premier League	21	2	1	0	3	0	0	0	25	2
Vasco da Gama	1995	Série A	4	1	0	0	0	0	0	0	4	1
Los Angeles Galaxy	1996	Major League Soccer	28	7								
Los Angeles Galaxy	1997	Major League Soccer	26	7					4	1		
Los Angeles Galaxy	1998	Major League Soccer	24	19								
Los Angeles Galaxy	1999	Major League Soccer	28	8					1			
Los Angeles Galaxy	2000	Major League Soccer	25	7					3	1		
Los Angeles Galaxy	2001	Major League Soccer	22	6								
Los Angeles Galaxy	2002	Major League Soccer	19	3								
Los Angeles Galaxy	2003	Major League Soccer	28	2					4			
Los Angeles Galaxy	2004	Major League Soccer	23	0								
Los Angeles Galaxy	2005	Major League Soccer	31	3								
Los Angeles Galaxy	2006	Major League Soccer	27	4					2			
Los Angeles Galaxy	2007	Major League Soccer	25	4								
Los Angeles Galaxy	Total		306	70								
Career total			306	70					14	2		

=== International ===
Appearances and goals by national team and year
National team	Year	Apps	Goals
United States	1992	3	1
United States	1993	30	2
United States	1994	23	2
United States	1995	12	1
United States	1996	14	2
United States	1997	14	0
United States	1998	15	0
United States	1999	8	0
United States	2000	16	6
United States	2001	10	0
United States	2002	14	0
United States	2003	1	0
United States	2004	4	1
Total		164	15

Scores and results list the United States' goal tally first, score column indicates score after each Jones goal.

List of international goals scored by Cobi Jones
No.	Date	Venue	Opponent	Score	Result	Competition
1	October 19, 1992	Riyadh, Saudi Arabia	Ivory Coast	2–1	5–1	1992 King Fahd Cup
2	March 23, 1993	San Salvador, El Salvador	El Salvador	2–1	2–2	Friendly
3	October 13, 1993	Washington, D.C., United States	Mexico	1–1	1–1	Friendly
4	January 15, 1994	Tempe, Arizona, United States	Norway	2–1	2–1	Friendly
5	February 18, 1994	Miami, Florida, United States	Bolivia	1–1	1–1	Friendly
6	June 11, 1995	Foxborough, Massachusetts, United States	Nigeria	3–2	3–2	Friendly
7	May 26, 1996	New Britain, Connecticut, United States	Scotland	2–1	2–1	Friendly
8	December 1, 1996	San José, Costa Rica	Costa Rica	1–2	1–2	Friendly
9	January 29, 2000	Coquimbo, Chile	Chile	2–1	2–1	Friendly
10	February 12, 2000	Miami, Florida, United States	Haiti	3–0	3–0	2000 Gold Cup
11	February 16, 2000	Miami, Florida, United States	Peru	1–0	1–0	2000 Gold Cup
12	June 3, 2000	Washington, D.C., United States	South Africa	1–0	4–0	2000 Nike U.S. Cup
13	June 3, 2000	Washington, D.C., United States	South Africa	2–0	4–0	2000 Nike U.S. Cup
14	November 15, 2000	Waterford, Barbados	Barbados	4–0	4–0	2002 World Cup qualifying
15	September 8, 2004	Panama City, Panama	Panama	1–1	1–1	2006 World Cup qualifying

== Honours ==
UCLA Bruins

- NCAA Division I: 1990
- NCAA College Cup: 1990

Los Angeles Galaxy

- MLS Cup: 2002, 2005
- Supporters' Shield: 1998, 2002
- Western Conference Playoffs: 1996, 1999, 2001, 2002, 2005
- Western Conference Regular Season: 1996, 1998, 1999, 2001, 2002
- U.S. Open Cup: 2001, 2005
- CONCACAF Champions' Cup: 2000

United States

- CONCACAF Gold Cup: 2002

Individual

- MLS All-Star: 1996, 1997, 1998, 1999, 2000
- MLS Best XI: 1998
- U.S. Soccer Athlete of the Year: 1998
- LA Galaxy Player of the Year: 1998
- MLS 25 Greatest
- MLS 50/50 Club

== See also ==
- List of men's footballers with 100 or more international caps
