= Adam Frye =

American soccer player (born 1974)

Personal information
- Full name: Adam Frye
- Date of birth: February 15, 1974 (age 52)
- Place of birth: Alamogordo, New Mexico, U.S.
- Height: 5 ft 8 in (1.73 m)
- Positions: Defender; forward

Youth career
- 1992–1995: UCLA Bruins

Senior career*
Years	Team	Apps	(Gls)
1996–1998	Tampa Bay Mutiny	43	(0)
1996	→ Tampa Bay Cyclones (loan)		(2)
1999	San Jose Clash	3	(0)
1999	→ Team Sacramento (loan)	2	(0)
1999	→ MLS Pro 40 (loan)	1	(0)
2000	Orange County Zodiac	1	(0)
2000–2002	Los Angeles Galaxy	48	(2)
2000	→ MLS Pro-40 (loan)	1	(0)
2000	→ San Diego Flash (loan)	5	(2)
2009–	Southern California Seahorses	13	(0)
- * Club domestic league appearances and goals as of 22 July 2009

Adam Frye (born February 15, 1974) is an American soccer player who last played for Southern California Seahorses in the USL Premier Development League.

== Career ==
=== Youth and collegiate ===
Frye was a Parade magazine High School All-American soccer player the 1992 New Mexico High School Soccer Player of the Year. He played college soccer at the University of California, Los Angeles from 1992 to 1995. A forward in high school, UCLA coach Sigi Schmid moved Frye to the backline his first season at UCLA. In 1995, in his senior season, Frye was named his team's defensive MVP.

=== Professional ===
Frye was selected in the first round (fourth overall) of the 1996 MLS College Draft by Tampa Bay Mutiny. He spent three seasons in Tampa Bay before being released in 1998. On February 7, 1999, the San Jose Clash chose Frye in the first round (third overall) of the 1999 MLS Supplemental Draft. He played only three games with the Clash, who waived him at the end of the season. He began the 2000 preseason with the San Diego Flash of the USL A-League. However, on March 16, 2000, the Los Angeles Galaxy picked him in the Waiver Draft. He only played six games with the Galaxy that season as they loaned him to MLS Project 40 for one game, then back to the Flash. He also played one game with the Orange County Zodiac in 2000.

In 2001, he saw time in twenty-two games, many as a forward, as the Galaxy was hit with several injuries to its front line. Frye and his teammates also won the 2001 U.S. Open Cup. He played another twenty games in 2002, but was released at the end of the season and retired from playing professionally.

In 2005, he played in a Chivas USA reserve game.

In 2009 Frye came out of retirement to play a season with the Southern California Seahorses in the USL Premier Development League.

== Personal life ==
Frye met his wife, Gina, through a charity auction benefiting children suffering from cancer. Gina paid $350 to go on a date with him, not expecting the date to materialize, but considering the money well spent if it helped the children. She ultimately went on the date with Frye, eventually leading to their marriage.
