= MLS Cup Most Valuable Player =

Major League Soccer individual award

- Sport: Soccer
- League: Major League Soccer
- Awarded for: Most valuable player of the MLS Cup
- Sponsored by: Audi
- Country: United States; Canada

History
- First award: 1996
- First winner: Marco Etcheverry
- Most wins: Landon Donovan; Dwayne De Rosario (2 each)
- Most recent: Lionel Messi (1st title)

The MLS Cup Most Valuable Player, currently known as the Audi MLS Cup Most Valuable Player for sponsorship reason, is an annual Major League Soccer (MLS) award for the most valuable player of the MLS Cup, the annual championship game of MLS and the culmination of the MLS Cup playoffs. This title was introduced at the first season in 1996 and has been awarded continuously ever since. This award is determined by a combination of votes from experts and fans, ensuring both objectivity and broad appeal. Specifically, the result is based 70% on votes from media personnel, sports journalists, and the broadcasting team at the venue of the game, and the 30% comes from the fans via an online poll open throughout the game. The vote-counting process concludes immediately upon the final whistle to determine the winner.

Typically, the award goes to players who score the decisive goal or make a pivotal contribution to securing the title for their club. Historically, forwards and midfielders have dominated the honors; however, goalkeepers who deliver outstanding performances or make saves during shootouts have also frequently won the award, a notable example being LAFC’s John McCarthy in 2022.

Lionel Messi of Inter Miami CF is the current holder of the award, having recorded two assists in the 2025 final.

== List of winners ==
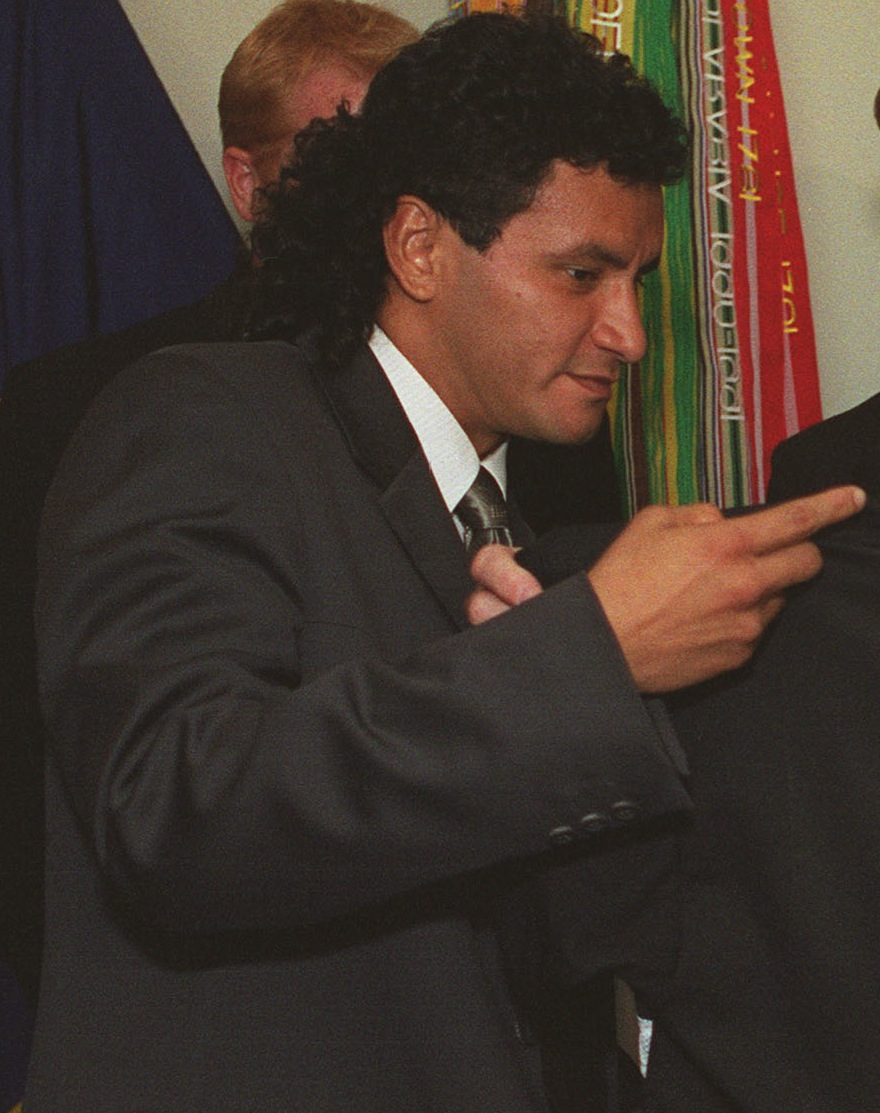
Marco Etcheverry, the first MLS Cup MVP winner

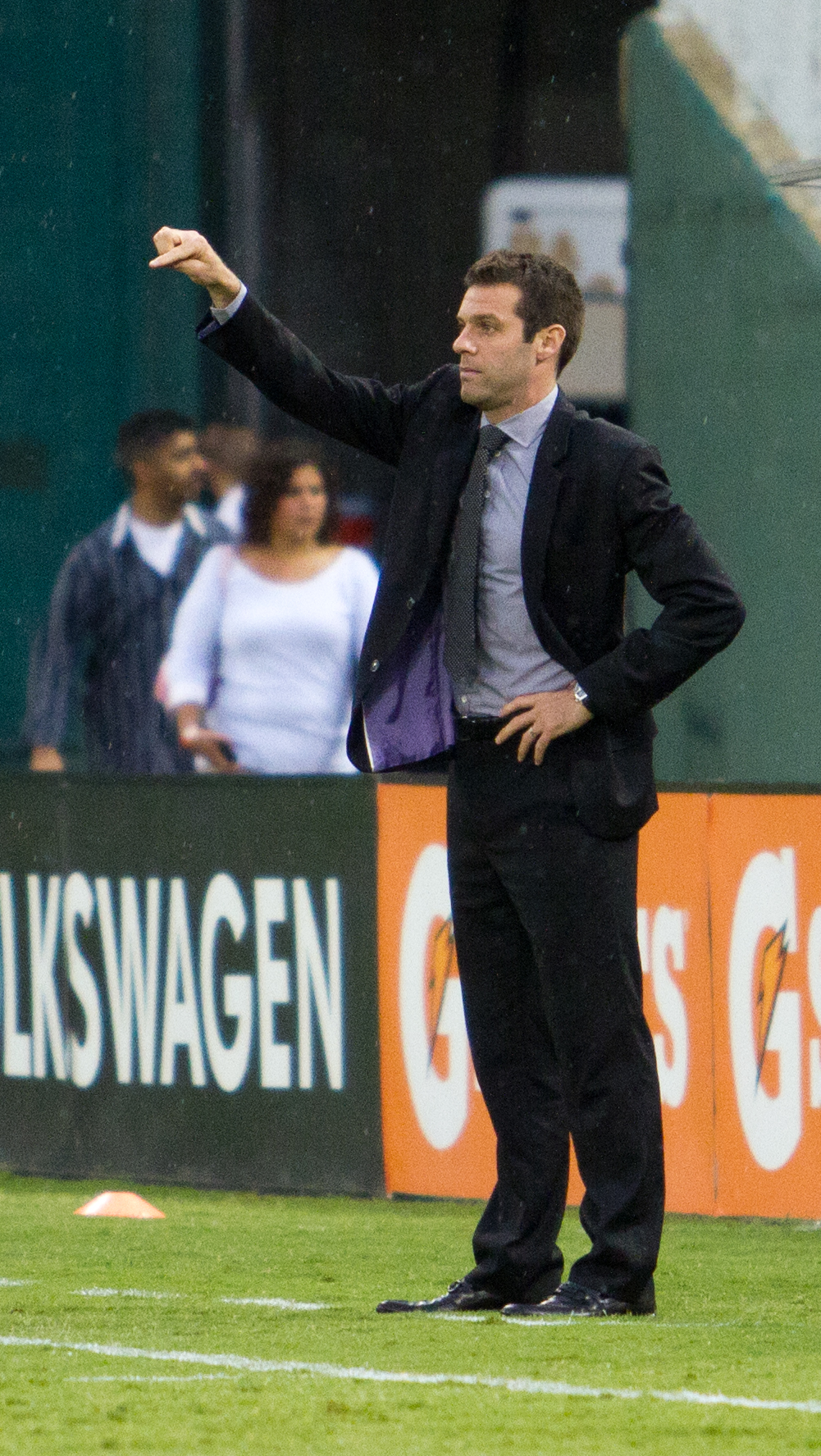
Ben Olsen, the first American player to win the award

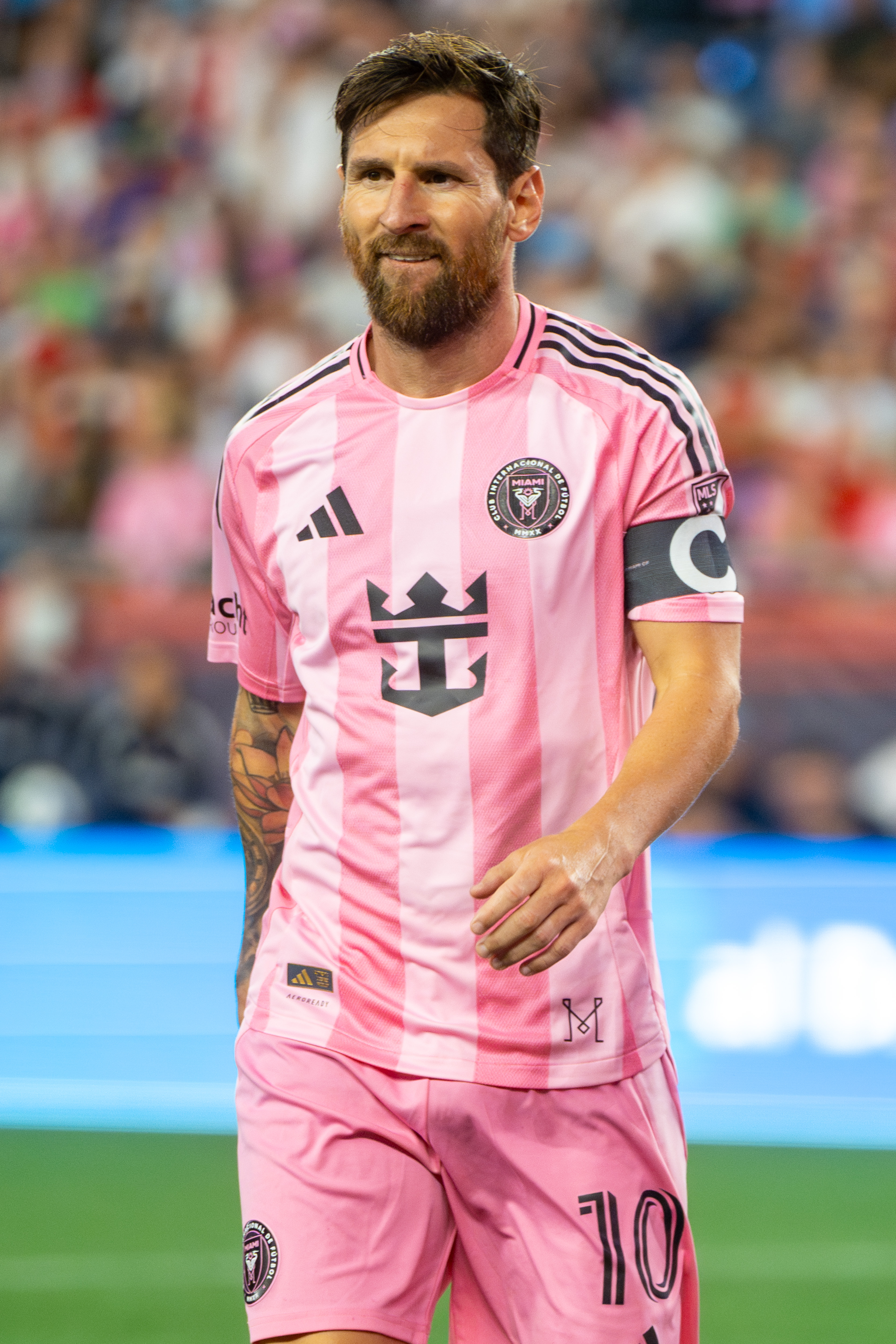
Lionel Messi, the most recent MLS Cup MVP winner

Key for the below tables
Symbol	Description
Season	Each year is linked to an article about that particular MLS season
Winner (#)	Denotes number of times the player has won the award
†	Player still active in MLS
*	Player elected to the National Soccer Hall of Fame
Star symbol (★)	Player also won the season MVP
Team (#)	Denotes number of times the team has won the award
Position (#)	Denotes number of times the position has won the award

MLS Cup Most Valuable Players
Season	Edition no.	Winner	Team	Position	Nationality	College	Ref.
1996	1	Marco Etcheverry*	D.C. United	Midfielder	Bolivia	—N/a	
1997	2	Jaime Moreno*	D.C. United (2)	Forward	Bolivia	—N/a	
1998	3	Piotr Nowak	Chicago Fire	Midfielder (2)	Poland	—N/a	
1999	4	Ben Olsen	D.C. United (3)	Midfielder (3)	United States	Virginia	
2000	5	★ Tony Meola*	Kansas City Wizards^{1}	Goalkeeper	United States	Virginia	
2001	6	Dwayne De Rosario	San Jose Earthquakes	Forward (2)	Canada	—N/a	
2002	7	★ Carlos Ruiz	Los Angeles Galaxy	Striker (3)^{2}	Guatemala	—N/a	
2003	8	Landon Donovan*	San Jose Earthquakes (2)	Forward (4)	United States	IMG	
2004	9	Alecko Eskandarian	D.C. United (4)	Forward (5)	United States	Virginia	
2005	10	Guillermo Ramírez	Los Angeles Galaxy (2)	Midfielder (4)	Guatemala	—N/a	
2006	11	Brian Ching	Houston Dynamo	Forward (6)	United States	Gonzaga	
2007	12	Dwayne De Rosario (2)	Houston Dynamo (2)	Midfielder (5)	Canada	—N/a	
2008	13	★ Guillermo Barros Schelotto	Columbus Crew	Midfielder (6)	Argentina	—N/a	
2009	14	Nick Rimando	Real Salt Lake	Goalkeeper (2)	United States	UCLA	
2010	15	Conor Casey	Colorado Rapids	Forward (7)	United States	Portland	
2011	16	Landon Donovan* (2)	Los Angeles Galaxy (2)	Forward (8)	United States	IMG	
2012	17	Omar Gonzalez	Los Angeles Galaxy (3)	Centre-back^{3}	United States	Maryland	
2013	18	Aurélien Collin	Sporting Kansas City (2)^{1}	Centre-back (2)^{3}	France	—N/a	
2014	19	★ Robbie Keane	Los Angeles Galaxy (4)	Centre-forward (9)^{4}	Ireland	—N/a	
2015	20	Diego Valeri	Portland Timbers	Central midfielder (7)^{5}	Argentina	—N/a	
2016	21	Stefan Frei ^{†}	Seattle Sounders FC	Goalkeeper (3)	Switzerland	California	
2017	22	Jozy Altidore	Toronto FC	Striker (10)^{2}	United States	—N/a	
2018	23	★ Josef Martínez ^{†}	Atlanta United FC	Centre-forward (11)^{4}	Venezuela	—N/a	
2019	24	Víctor Rodríguez	Seattle Sounders FC (2)	Midfielder (8)	Spain	—N/a	
2020	25	Lucas Zelarayán	Columbus Crew SC (2)	Midfielder (9)	Argentina	—N/a	
2021	26	Sean Johnson ^{†}	New York City FC	Goalkeeper (4)	United States	Florida (C)	
2022	27	John McCarthy ^{†}	Los Angeles FC	Goalkeeper (5)	United States	La Salle	
2023	28	Cucho Hernández	Columbus Crew (3)	Forward (12)	Colombia	—N/a	
2024	29	Gastón Brugman	Los Angeles Galaxy (5)	Central midfielder (10)^{5}	Uruguay	—N/a	
2025	30	★ Lionel Messi ^{†}	Inter Miami CF	Centre-forward (13)^{4}	Argentina	—N/a	

Notes
^{1} From 1997 to 2010, the team was known as the Kansas City Wizards before changing its name to Sporting Kansas City.
^{2} A striker is a type of forward.
^{3} A centre-back is a type of defender.
^{4} A centre-forward is a type of forward.
^{5} A central midfielder is a type of midfielder.

== Statistics ==
=== By team ===
MLS Cup MVPs by team
Rank	Team	Conference	Total	Year(s)
1	Los Angeles Galaxy	Western	6	2002, 2005, 2011, 2012, 2014, 2024
2	D.C. United	Eastern	4	1996, 1997, 1999, 2004
3	Columbus Crew	Eastern	3	2008, 2020, 2023
T-4	San Jose Earthquakes	Western	2	2001, 2003
T-4	Houston Dynamo FC	Western	2	2006, 2007
T-4	Sporting Kansas City	Western	2	2000, 2013
T-4	Seattle Sounders FC	Western	2	2016, 2019
T-8	Chicago Fire FC	Eastern	1	1998
T-8	Real Salt Lake	Western	1	2009
T-8	Colorado Rapids	Western	1	2010
T-8	Portland Timbers	Western	1	2015
T-8	Toronto FC	Eastern	1	2017
T-8	Atlanta United FC	Eastern	1	2018
T-8	New York City FC	Eastern	1	2021
T-8	Los Angeles FC	Western	1	2022
T-8	Inter Miami CF	Eastern	1	2025

=== By position ===
MLS Cup MVPs by position
Rank	Position	Total	Last won
1	Forward	13	2025
2	Midfielder	10	2024
3	Goalkeeper	5	2022
4	Defender	2	2013

=== By nationality ===
MLS Cup MVPs by nationality
Rank	Nationality	Total	Last won
1	United States	12	2022
2	Argentina	4	2025
T-3	Bolivia	2	1997
T-3	Canada	2	2007
T-3	Guatemala	2	2005
T-6	Colombia	1	2023
T-6	France	1	2013
T-6	Ireland	1	2014
T-6	Poland	1	1998
T-6	Switzerland	1	2016
T-6	Spain	1	2019
T-6	Uruguay	1	2024
T-6	Venezuela	1	2018

=== Multiple winners ===
Player	Position	Team(s)	Wins	Years
Landon Donovan*	Forward	San Jose Earthquakes; Los Angeles Galaxy	2	2000, 2011
Dwayne De Rosario	Forward	San Jose Earthquakes; Houston Dynamo	2	2001, 2007

== See also ==
- Landon Donovan MVP Award
- MLS Best XI
