= 2000 D.C. United season =

D.C. United
2000 season
- General manager: Dave Kasper
- Head coach: Thomas Rongen
- Stadium: RFK Stadium
- MLS: Division: 4th Overall: 11th
- MLS Cup Playoffs: Did not qualify
- U.S. Open Cup: Quarterfinals
- CONCACAF Champions Cup: Semifinals
- Top goalscorer: League: All: Jaime Moreno (12)
| Home colors | Away colors | Third colors |

The 2000 D.C. United season was the club's sixth year of existence, as well as their fifth season in Major League Soccer.

Upon winning the 1999 MLS Cup final, United were unable to not only defend their league title, but the club failed to qualify for the MLS Cup Playoffs. This was the first time in MLS history the defending MLS Cup champion failed to qualify for the MLS Cup Playoffs the subsequent season, a feat that would not be accomplished again until the Portland Timbers did so in 2016.

In continental play, United played in the 2000 CONCACAF Champions' Cup, which was held months before the actual season began, a possible reason for United's poor league play, along with salary cap restrictions. United finished fourth in the tournament, at first beating Central American runners-up Alajuelense 2–1 in the quarterfinals. In the semis, the Los Angeles Galaxy got revenge on United in a penalty kick shootout following a 1–1 regulation time draw. Consequently, United played Toluca for third place and lost 2–1.

== Review ==
=== June ===
D.C. United beat Charleston Battery 4–0 to open the USOC.

=== July ===
Returning to USOC play in the third round proper, United shut out the Rochester Raging Rhinos, 3–0.

=== August ===
Entering the USOC semis, the Black and Red played their first MLS opponent in the tournament, the Miami Fusion. United lost 3–2 in extra time.

== Match results ==
| Win | Tie | Loss |

=== MLS ===
| March 25, 2000 1 | D.C. United | 0–4 | LA Galaxy | Washington, D.C. |
| 15:00 UTC−5 | | Report | Mathis 11'; Jones 59', 89'; Victorine 90+2' | Stadium: RFK Stadium; Attendance: 24,147 |

| April 1, 2000 2 | MetroStars | 3–2 | D.C. United | East Rutherford, New Jersey |
| 21:06 UTC−5 | Comas 5'; Kelly 23'; Valencia 56' | Report | Moreno 63'; Agoos 84' | Stadium: Giants Stadium; Attendance: 27,322 |

| April 8, 2000 3 | D.C. United | 3–2 | Chicago Fire | Washington, D.C. |
| 19:30 UTC−5 | Maessner 14'; Moreno 90+2'; Olsen 90+3' | Report | Stoichkov 46'; Marsch 85' | Stadium: RFK Stadium; Attendance: 14,612 |

| April 15, 2000 4 | New England Revolution | 2–1 | D.C. United | Foxborough, Massachusetts |
| 19:30 UTC−5 | Baba 72', 90+7' | Report | Moreno 19' | Stadium: Foxboro Stadium; Attendance: 15,174 |

| April 22, 2000 5 | D.C. United | 2–3 | MetroStars | Washington, D.C. |
| 19:30 UTC−5 | Etcheverry 22', 25' | Report | Hayes 9' (o.g.); Villegas 41'; Petke 90+4' | Stadium: RFK Stadium; Attendance: 14,985 |

| April 29, 2000 6 | San Jose Earthquakes | 2–2 | D.C. United | San Jose, California |
| 01:00 UTC−5 | Cerritos 20'; Conteh 69' | Report | Etcheverry 33'; Moreno 44' | Stadium: Spartan Stadium; Attendance: 13,717 |

| May 3, 2000 7 | D.C. United | 1–2 | Columbus Crew | Washington, D.C. |
| 19:30 UTC−5 | Talley 59' | Report | Warzycha 52'; Llamosa 88' (o.g.) | Stadium: RFK Stadium; Attendance: 11,872 |

| May 6, 2000 8 | Colorado Rapids | 2–5 | D.C. United | Denver, Colorado |
| UTC−5 | Vermillion 56'; Agogo 67' | Report | Talley 36'; Moreno 59', 62', 78'; Llamosa 70' | Stadium: Mile High Stadium; Attendance: 7,125 |

| May 10, 2000 9 | Miami Fusion | 1–0 | D.C. United | Fort Lauderdale, Florida |
| 19:30 UTC−5 | Melo 90+8' | Report | | Stadium: Lockhart Stadium; Attendance: 5,058 |

| May 13, 2000 10 | D.C. United | 1–3 | New England Revolution | Washington, D.C. |
| 20:00 UTC−5 | Moreno 14' | Report | Harris 16'; Ramos 66'; Baba 83' | Stadium: RFK Stadium; Attendance: 18,493 |

| May 17, 2000 11 | Kansas City Wizards | 2–0 | D.C. United | Kansas City, Missouri |
| 20:36 UTC−5 | | | | Stadium: Arrowhead Stadium |

| May 20, 2000 12 | LA Galaxy | 2–1 | D.C. United | Pasadena, California |
| 00:00 UTC−5 | | | | Stadium: Rose Bowl |

| May 27, 2000 13 | D.C. United | 3–2 | Dallas Burn | Washington, D.C. |
| 19:30 UTC−5 | | | | Stadium: RFK Stadium |

| June 3, 2000 14 | Columbus Crew | 1–1 | D.C. United | Columbus, Ohio |
| 20:00 UTC−5 | | | | Stadium: Crew Stadium |

| June 10, 2000 15 | D.C. United | 0–0 | Kansas City Wizards | Washington, D.C. |
| 19:30 UTC−5 | | | | Stadium: RFK Stadium |

| June 17, 2000 16 | Chicago Fire | 3–2 | D.C. United | Washington, D.C. |
| 20:00 UTC−5 | | | | Stadium: RFK Stadium |

| June 21, 2000 17 | MetroStars | 2–2 | D.C. United | East Rutherford, New Jersey |
| 19:30 UTC−5 | | | | Stadium: Giants Stadium |

| June 24, 2000 18 | D.C. United | 2–0 | Dallas Burn | Washington, D.C. |
| 16:30 UTC−5 | | | | Stadium: RFK Stadium |

| June 28, 2000 19 | D.C. United | 1–2 | LA Galaxy | Washington, D.C. |
| 19:30 UTC−5 | | | | Stadium: RFK Stadium |

| July 1, 2000 20 | D.C. United | 1–1 | Colorado Rapids | Washington, D.C. |
| 15:00 UTC−5 | | | | Stadium: RFK Stadium |

| July 4, 2000 21 | Tampa Bay Mutiny | 3–0 | D.C. United | Tampa, Florida |
| 19:00 UTC−5 | | | | Stadium: Raymond James Stadium |

| July 8, 2000 22 | Dallas Burn | 3–0 | D.C. United | Dallas |
| 21:00 UTC−5 | | | | Stadium: Cotton Bowl |

| July 12, 2000 23 | D.C. United | 2–2 | Tampa Bay Mutiny | Washington, D.C. |
| 19:30 UTC−5 | | | | Stadium: RFK Stadium |

| July 15, 2000 24 | LA Galaxy | 1–2 | D.C. United | Pasadena, California |
| 01:30 UTC−5 | | | | Stadium: Rose Bowl |

| August 2, 2000 25 | D.C. United | 3–2 | MetroStars | Washington, D.C. |
| 19:30 UTC−5 | | | | Stadium: RFK Stadium |

| August 5, 2000 26 | Miami Fusion | 3–1 | D.C. United | Fort Lauderdale, Florida |
| 19:30 UTC−5 | | | | Stadium: Lockhart Stadium |

| August 12, 2000 27 | Dallas Burn | 1–0 | D.C. United | Dallas |
| 21:30 UTC−5 | | | | Stadium: Cotton Bowl |

| August 19, 2000 28 | D.C. United | 0–1 | San Jose Earthquakes | Washington, D.C. |
| 20:00 UTC−5 | | | | Stadium: RFK Stadium |

| August 26, 2000 29 | D.C. United | 2–1 | Miami Fusion | Washington, D.C. |
| UTC−5 | | | | Stadium: RFK Stadium |

| August 30, 2000 30 | New England Revolution | 1–0 | D.C. United | Foxborough, Massachusetts |
| UTC−5 | Morales (unassisted) 59 | | | Stadium: Foxboro Stadium; Attendance: 15,489; Referee: Marcel Yonan |

| September 3, 2000 31 | D.C. United | 2–0 | New England Revolution | Washington, D.C. |
| UTC−5 | Marino (Agoos) 56 Marino (Wood) 61 | | | Stadium: RFK Stadium; Attendance: 51,996; Referee: Kevin Stott |

| September 9, 2000 32 | D.C. United | 2–6 | Miami Fusion | Washington, D.C. |
| UTC−5 | Aunger (Cooks) 53; Own Goal (Mastroeni) 79 | | Serna (Bilyk) 7 Welton (Serna) 47; Serna (Machon) 55; Own Goal (Denton) 57; Beckerman (Welton) 58 Serna (Kamler) 63 | Stadium: RFK Stadium; Attendance: 18,893; Referee: Brian Hall |

=== CONCACAF Champion's Cup ===
| Round | Date | Opponent | Venue | Result | Attendance | Scorers | Ref. |
|---|---|---|---|---|---|---|---|
| QF | January 16, 2000 | (Costa Rica) Alajuelense | N | 2–1 | | | |
| SF | January 19, 2000 | (United States) Los Angeles Galaxy | N | 1–1 (2–4 pen.) | | | |

=== U.S. Open Cup ===
| Round | Date | Opponent | Venue | Result | Attendance | Scorers | Ref. |
|---|---|---|---|---|---|---|---|
| R2 | June 14, 2000 | (South Carolina) Charleston Battery | A | 4–0 | 3,672 | Moreno, Díaz Arce (3) | |
| R3 | July 26, 2000 | (New York (state)) Rochester Raging Rhinos | H | 3–0 | 3,186 | Albright (2), Moreno | |
| QF | August 9, 2000 | (Florida) Miami Fusion | H | 2–3 (a.e.t.) | 3,864 | Moreno (2) | |

== League standings ==
=== Division ===
| Pos | Team | Pld | W | L | T | GF | GA | GD | Pts | Qualification |
|---|---|---|---|---|---|---|---|---|---|---|
| 1 | MetroStars | 32 | 17 | 12 | 3 | 64 | 56 | +8 | 54 | MLS Cup Playoffs |
| 2 | New England Revolution | 32 | 13 | 13 | 6 | 47 | 49 | −2 | 45 | MLS Cup Playoffs |
| 3 | Miami Fusion | 32 | 12 | 15 | 5 | 54 | 56 | −2 | 41 | |
| 4 | D.C. United | 32 | 8 | 18 | 6 | 44 | 63 | −19 | 30 | |

Source: MLS

Rules for classification: 1st points; 2nd head-to-head record; 3rd goal difference; 4th number of goals scored.
(SS) = MLS Supporters' Shield; (E1) = Eastern Division champion
Only applicable when the season is not finished:
(Q) = Qualified for the MLS Cup Playoffs, but not yet to the particular round indicated; (E) = Eliminated from playoff-contention.

=== Overall ===
| Pos | Team | Pld | W | L | T | GF | GA | GD | Pts | Qualification |
|---|---|---|---|---|---|---|---|---|---|---|
| 1 | Kansas City Wizards (C, S) | 32 | 16 | 7 | 9 | 47 | 29 | +18 | 57 | CONCACAF Champions' Cup |
| 2 | Chicago Fire | 32 | 17 | 9 | 6 | 67 | 51 | +16 | 57 | CONCACAF Champions' Cup |
| 3 | MetroStars | 32 | 17 | 12 | 3 | 64 | 56 | +8 | 54 | |
| 4 | Tampa Bay Mutiny | 32 | 16 | 12 | 4 | 62 | 50 | +12 | 52 | |
| 5 | Los Angeles Galaxy | 32 | 14 | 10 | 8 | 47 | 37 | +10 | 50 | |
| 6 | Dallas Burn | 32 | 14 | 14 | 4 | 54 | 54 | 0 | 46 | |
| 7 | New England Revolution | 32 | 13 | 13 | 6 | 47 | 49 | −2 | 45 | |
| 8 | Colorado Rapids | 32 | 13 | 15 | 4 | 43 | 59 | −16 | 43 | |
| 9 | Miami Fusion | 32 | 12 | 15 | 5 | 54 | 56 | −2 | 41 | |
| 10 | Columbus Crew | 32 | 11 | 16 | 5 | 48 | 58 | −10 | 38 | |
| 11 | D.C. United | 32 | 8 | 18 | 6 | 44 | 63 | −19 | 30 | |
| 12 | San Jose Earthquakes | 32 | 7 | 17 | 8 | 35 | 50 | −15 | 29 | |

Source: MLS
Rules for classification: 1) points; 2) head-to-head record; 3) goal difference; 4) number of goals scored
(C) Champion; (S) Supporters' Shield

Rules for classification: 1st points; 2nd head-to-head record; 3rd goal difference; 4th number of goals scored.
(SS) = MLS Supporters' Shield; (E1) = Eastern Division champion, (C1) = Central Division champion, (W1) = Western Division champion
Only applicable when the season is not finished:
(Q) = Qualified for the MLS Cup Playoffs, but not yet to the particular round indicated; (E) = Eliminated from playoff-contention.
