= List of LA Galaxy seasons =

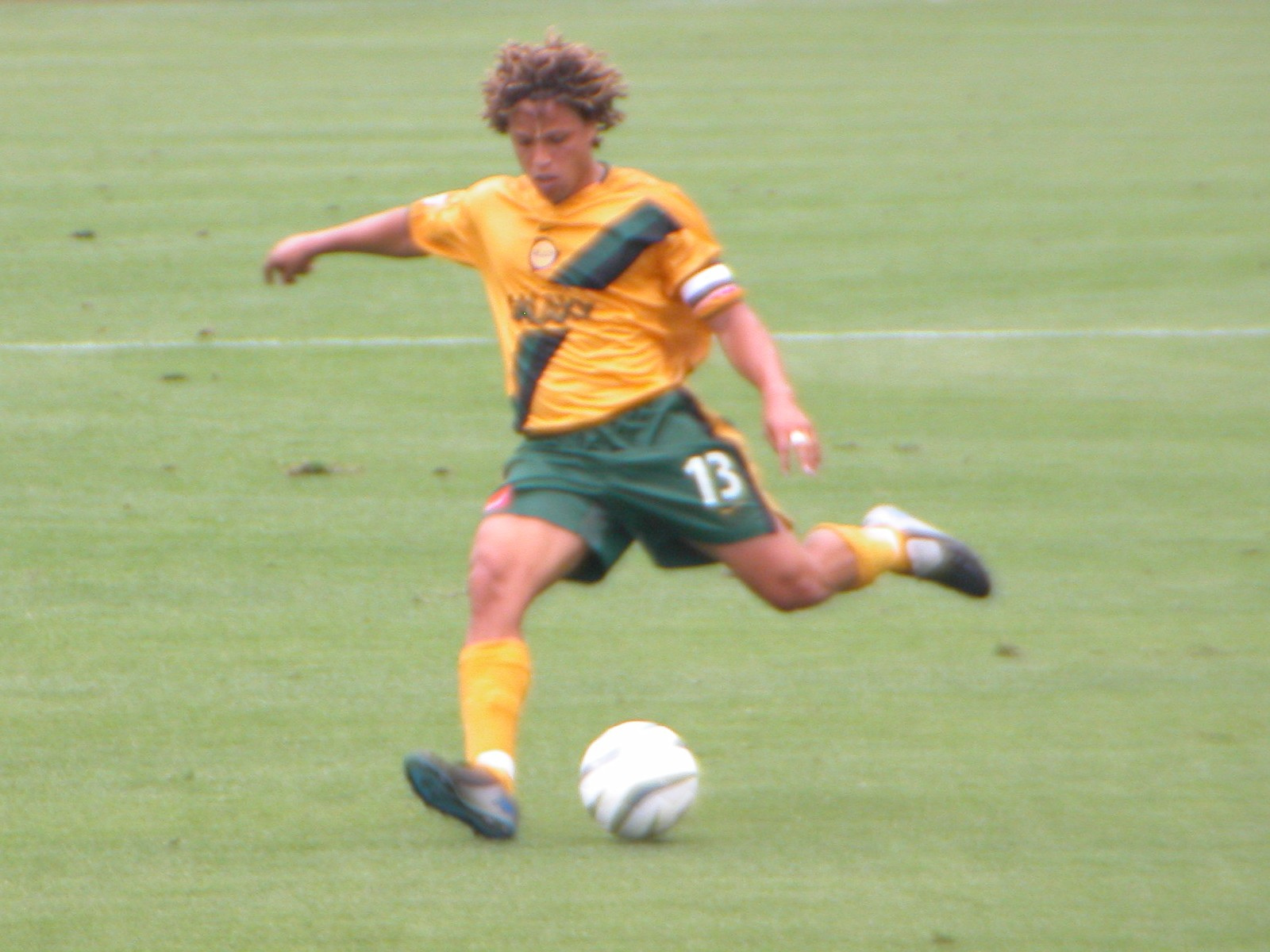
Cobi Jones, twice the leading goalscorer for the Galaxy, was a member of the squad that won the 2000 CONCACAF Champions' Cup, the franchise's first honor.

The Los Angeles Galaxy are an American soccer club based in the Greater Los Angeles suburb of Carson, California, which competes in Major League Soccer, the top tier soccer league in the United States and Canada. Among MLS clubs, the Galaxy are the second most decorated club. In terms of American soccer clubs of all-time, the Galaxy are the third most decorated club in American soccer history, amassing a total of 12 major trophies (be it a World, Continental, League Premiership, League Championship or National Championship). Since 2003 the team has played in The Home Depot Center, located on the campus California State University, Dominguez Hills in Carson, California. Prior to that, the club played in the Rose Bowl in Pasadena, California.

The following is a season results list for each year of the club's existence, inclusive of all competitive competitions that the Galaxy have partaken in. Friendly competitions have been excluded. The Galaxy have won a record five MLS Cups in nine final appearances, four Supporters' Shields and four second place finishes, two U.S. Open Cups in four final appearances, and one CONCACAF Champions' Cup in two title berths. The team has also finished first in the Western Conference seven times in its franchise history.

== Key ==
Key to competitions

- Major League Soccer (MLS) – The top-flight of soccer in the United States, established in 1996.
- U.S. Open Cup (USOC) – The premier knockout cup competition in U.S. soccer, first contested in 1914.
- CONCACAF Champions League (CCL) – The premier competition in North American soccer since 1962. It went by the name of Champions' Cup until 2008.

Key to colors and symbols

1st or W	Winners
2nd or RU	Runners-up
3rd	Third place
Last	Wooden Spoon
♦	MLS Golden Boot
	Highest average attendance
Italics	Ongoing competition

Key to league record

- Season = The year and article of the season
- Div = Division/level on pyramid
- League = League name
- Pld = Games played
- W = Games won
- L = Games lost
- D = Games drawn
- GF = Goals for
- GA = Goals against
- GD = Goal difference
- Pts = Points
- PPG = Points per game
- Conf. = Conference position
- Overall = League position

Key to cup record

- DNE = Did not enter
- DNQ = Did not qualify
- NH = Competition not held or canceled
- QR = Qualifying round
- PR = Preliminary round
- GS = Group stage
- R1 = First round
- R2 = Second round
- R3 = Third round
- R4 = Fourth round
- R5 = Fifth round
- Ro16 = Round of 16
- QF = Quarterfinals
- SF = Semifinals
- F = Final
- RU = Runners-up
- W = Winners

== Seasons ==
Season	League									Position		Playoffs	USOC	International			Average attendance	Top goalscorer(s)	
Season	Pld	W	L	D	GF	GA	GD	Pts	PPG	Conf.	Overall	Playoffs	USOC	CCL	LC	SL	Average attendance	Name(s)	Goals
1996	32	19	13	0	59	49	+10	49	1.53	1st	2nd	RU	DNE	DNE	NH	--	28,916	(Ecuador) Eduardo Hurtado	24
1997	32	16	16	0	55	44	+11	44	1.38	2nd	4th	QF	DNE	RU	NH	--	20,626	(Brazil) Wélton Araújo Melo	12
1998	32	24	8	0	85	44	+41	68	2.13	1st	1st	SF	DNE	DNQ	NH	--	21,784	(United States) Cobi Jones	19
1999	32	20	12	0	49	29	+20	54	1.69	1st	2nd	RU	QF	PR	NH	--	17,632	(Mexico) Carlos Hermosillo	11
2000	32	14	10	8	47	37	+10	50	1.56	2nd	5th	SF	SF	W	NH	--	20,400	(United States) Cobi Jones	9
2001	26	14	7	5	52	36	+16	47	1.81	1st	3rd	RU	W	NH	NH	--	17,387	(Mexico) Luis Hernández	10
2002	28	16	9	3	44	33	+11	51	1.82	1st	1st	W	RU	DNQ	NH	--	19,047	(Guatemala) Carlos Ruiz	32
2003	30	9	12	9	35	35	0	36	1.20	4th	9th	QF	SF	QF	NH	--	21,983	(Guatemala) Carlos Ruiz	17
2004	30	11	9	10	42	40	+2	43	1.43	2nd	3rd	SF	Ro16	DNQ	NH	--	23,809	(Guatemala) Carlos Ruiz	12
2005	32	13	13	6	44	45	–1	45	1.41	4th	9th	W	W	DNQ	NH	--	24,204	(United States) Landon Donovan	18
2006	32	11	15	6	37	37	0	39	1.22	5th	9th	DNQ	RU	QF	NH	--	20,814	(United States) Landon Donovan	16
2007	30	9	14	7	38	48	–10	34	1.13	5th	11th	DNQ	Ro16	DNQ	NH	RU	24,252	(United States) Landon Donovan	13
2008	30	8	13	9	55	62	–7	33	1.10	6th	13th	DNQ	QR1	DNQ	NH	--	26,009	(United States) Landon Donovan	20♦
2009	30	12	6	12	36	31	+5	48	1.60	1st	2nd	RU	QR1	DNQ	NH	--	20,827	(United States) Landon Donovan	15
2010	30	18	7	5	44	26	+18	59	1.97	1st	1st	SF	QF	PR	NH	--	21,437	(United States) Edson Buddle	19
2011	34	19	5	10	48	28	+20	67	1.97	1st	1st	W	QF	QF	NH	--	23,335	(United States) Landon Donovan	17
2012	34	16	12	6	59	47	+12	54	1.59	4th	8th	W	R3	SF	NH	--	23,136	(Republic of Ireland) Robbie Keane	23
2013	34	15	11	8	53	38	+15	53	1.56	3rd	5th	QF	R3	QF	NH	--	22,152	(Republic of Ireland) Robbie Keane	19
2014	34	17	7	10	69	37	+32	61	1.79	2nd	2nd	W	Ro16	DNQ	NH	--	21,258	(Republic of Ireland) Robbie Keane	23
2015	34	14	11	9	56	46	+10	51	1.50	5th	9th	R1	QF	QF	NH	--	23,392	(Republic of Ireland) Robbie Keane	25
2016	34	12	6	16	54	39	+15	52	1.53	3rd	6th	QF	SF	DNQ	NH	--	25,138	(Mexico) Giovani dos Santos	16
2017	34	8	18	8	45	67	–22	32	0.94	11th	22nd	DNQ	QF	DNQ	NH	--	22,246	(France) Romain Alessandrini	13
2018	34	13	12	9	66	64	+2	48	1.41	7th	13th	DNQ	Ro16	DNQ	NH	--	24,444	(Sweden) Zlatan Ibrahimović	22
2019	34	16	15	3	58	59	–1	51	1.50	5th	8th	QF	Ro16	DNQ	SF	--	23,205	(Sweden) Zlatan Ibrahimović	31
2020	22	6	12	4	27	46	–19	22	1.00	10th	20th	DNQ	NH	DNQ	NH	--	2,199	(Argentina) Cristian Pavón	10
2021	34	13	12	9	50	54	–4	48	1.41	8th	15th	DNQ	NH	DNQ	DNQ	--	14,849	(Mexico) Javier Hernández	17
2022	34	14	12	8	58	51	+7	50	1.47	4th	8th	QF	QF	DNQ	DNQ	--	23,336	(Mexico) Javier Hernández	18
2023	34	8	14	12	51	67	–16	36	1.06	13th	26th	DNQ	QF	DNQ	GS	--	24,106	(Spain) Riqui Puig	7
2024	34	19	8	7	63	43	+20	64	1.88	2nd	4th	W	DNE	DNQ	Ro32	--	23,690	(Serbia) Dejan Joveljić	19
2025	34	7	18	9	46	66	-20	30	0.88	14th	26th	DNQ	DNE	QF	SF	--	20,067	(Ghana) Joseph Paintsil	9
Total	854	382	293	179	1376	1171	+205	1303	1.53	–	–	–	–	–	–	–	–	(United States) Landon Donovan	141

1. Avg. attendance only includes statistics from regular season matches.
2. Top goalscorer(s) includes all goals scored in the regular season, MLS Cup Playoffs, U.S. Open Cup, MLS is Back Tournament, CONCACAF Champions League, FIFA Club World Cup, and other competitive continental matches.
