= 1999 D.C. United season =

D.C. United
1999 season
- General manager: Dave Kasper
- Head coach: Thomas Rongen
- Stadium: RFK Stadium
- MLS: 1st
- MLS Cup: Champions
- CONCACAF Champions Cup: Third place
- Top goalscorer: League: Roy Lassiter (18); All: Roy Lassiter (18)
Home colors	Away colors	Third colors

The 1999 D.C. United season was the clubs' fifth year of existence, as well as their fourth season in Major League Soccer.

Following shortcomings in MLS Cup '98, United took winning the league championship as their top priority entering 1999. With Bruce Arena's departure to coach the United States men's national team, Dutch coach Thomas Rongen took the helm as United head coach. Rongen's maiden campaign with United proved by incredibly successful, as United earned their third MLS Cup title, and their second MLS Supporters Shield.

The success of the league double culminating two previous MLS Cups, a Supporters Shield and the CONCACAF Champions' Cup was considered the apex of being tie-free until the mid to late 2000s. Their dominance in the league was cut short the year following strict salary cap restrictions enforced by MLS to ensure parity amongst clubs. Consequently, it resulted in certain core United players becoming too expensive for the club to retain, weakening the squad.

With the subsequent changes to the 1999 season, United would not qualify for the MLS Cup Playoffs again until 2003.

== Competitions ==
=== Major League Soccer ===
==== Standings ====
===== Eastern Conference =====
Pos	Team	Pld	W	SOW	L	GF	GA	GD	Pts	Qualification
1	D.C. United	32	17	6	9	65	43	+22	57	MLS Cup Playoffs
2	Columbus Crew	32	13	6	13	48	39	+9	45	MLS Cup Playoffs
3	Tampa Bay Mutiny	32	9	5	18	51	50	+1	32	MLS Cup Playoffs
4	Miami Fusion	32	8	5	19	42	59	−17	29	MLS Cup Playoffs
5	New England Revolution	32	7	5	20	38	53	−15	26	
6	MetroStars	32	4	3	25	32	64	−32	15	

Source: MLS

===== Overall Table =====
Pos	Team	Pld	W	SOW	L	GF	GA	GD	Pts	Qualification
1	D.C. United (C, S)	32	17	6	9	65	43	+22	57	CONCACAF Champions' Cup
2	Los Angeles Galaxy	32	17	3	12	49	29	+20	54	CONCACAF Champions' Cup
3	Dallas Burn	32	16	3	13	54	35	+19	51	
4	Chicago Fire	32	15	3	14	51	36	+15	48	
5	Colorado Rapids	32	14	6	12	38	39	−1	48	

Source: MLS
Rules for classification: 1) points; 2) head-to-head record; 3) goal difference; 4) number of goals scored
(C) Champions; (S) Supporters' Shield

==== Match results ====
March 20, 1999 1	Tampa Bay Mutiny	2–5	D.C. United	Tampa, Florida
UTC-5				Stadium: Raymond James Stadium

2	v
UTC-5

3	v
UTC-5

4	v
UTC-5

5	v
UTC-5

6	v
UTC-5

7	v
UTC-5

8	v
UTC-5

9	v
UTC-5

10	v
UTC-5

11	v
UTC-5

12	v
UTC-5

13	v
UTC-5

14	v
UTC-5

15	v
UTC-5

16	v
UTC-5

17	v
UTC-5

18	v
UTC-5

19	v
UTC-5

20	v
UTC-5

21	v
UTC-5

22	v
UTC-5

23	v
UTC-5

24	v
UTC-5

25	v
UTC-5

26	v
UTC-5

27	v
UTC-5

28	v
UTC-5

29	v
UTC-5

30	v
UTC-5

31	v
UTC-5

32	v
UTC-5

=== MLS Cup Playoffs ===
==== Conference semifinals ====
October 16, 1999 Game 1	D.C. United	2–0	Miami Fusion	Washington, D.C.
	Moreno 34', 88'	Report		Stadium: RFK Memorial Stadium; Attendance: 18,011

October 24, 1999 Game 2	Miami Fusion	0–0 (a.e.t.) (2–3 SO)	D.C. United	Fort Lauderdale, Florida
	Marshall (yellow card) 8'; Mastroeni (yellow card) 34'	Report	Presthus (yellow card) 72'	Stadium: Lockhart Stadium; Attendance: 8,446
	Shootout
	Mastroeni (penalty missed); Heaps (penalty missed); Rooney (penalty scored); S. Martínez (penalty scored); Vargas (penalty missed); Marshal (penalty missed)		(penalty scored) Etcheverry; (penalty missed) Wood; (penalty missed) Agoos; (penalty scored) Soñora; (penalty missed) Aunger; (penalty scored) Lassiter

D.C. United win in the series 2–0.

==== Conference finals ====
October 31, 1999 Game 1	D.C. United	2–1	Columbus Crew	Washington, D.C.
	Moreno 15'; Olsen 72'		Cunningham 82'	Stadium: RFK Memorial Stadium; Attendance: 14,529

November 7, 1999 Game 2	Columbus Crew	5–1	D.C. United	Columbus, Ohio
	Elcock 20'; Cunningham 41'; John 48', 61', 84'		Lassiter 7'	Stadium: Crew Stadium; Attendance: 12,778

October 31, 1999 Game 3	D.C. United	4–0	Columbus Crew	Washington, D.C.
	Moreno 17'; Lassiter 34', 52'; Etcheverry 86'			Stadium: RFK Memorial Stadium; Attendance: 21,451

D.C. United win in the series 2–1.

==== MLS Cup ====
November 21, 1999	LA Galaxy	0–2	D.C. United	Foxborough, Massachusetts
			Moreno 19'; Olsen 45+1'	Stadium: Foxboro Stadium; Attendance: 44,910

=== CONCACAF Champions Cup ===
==== Match results ====
September 29, 1999 Quarterfinals	D.C. United (United States)	1–0	(Honduras) Olimpia	Whitney, Nevada
	Moreno 68'			Stadium: Sam Boyd Stadium; Attendance: 7,127; Referee: Carlos Batres

October 1, 1999 Semifinals	D.C. United (United States)	1–3	(Mexico) Necaxa	Whitney, Nevada
	Talley 26'		Almaguer 40'; Delgado 57'; Oliva 68'	Stadium: Sam Boyd Stadium; Attendance: 8,163; Referee: Carlos Batres

== Statistics ==
=== Appearances and goals ===
Numbers after plus–sign (+) denote appearances as a substitute.

No.	Pos	Nat	Player	Total		MLS		U.S. Open Cup		MLS Cup		CONCACAF	
No.	Pos	Nat	Player	Apps	Goals	Apps	Goals	Apps	Goals	Apps	Goals	Apps	Goals
3	DF	(United States) USA	Carey Talley	31	5	16+13	4	0	0	0	0	2+0	1
5	DF	(Canada) CAN	Geoff Aunger	26	3	24+2	3	0	0	0	0	0	0
7	FW	(United States) USA	A. J. Wood	24	8	13+11	8	0	0	0	0	0	0
9	FW	(Bolivia) BOL	Jaime Moreno	27	11	25+0	10	0	0	0	0	2+0	1
10	MF	(Bolivia) BOL	Marco Etcheverry	22	4	22+0	4	0	0	0	0	0	0
12	DF	(United States) USA	Jeff Agoos	30	2	29+1	2	0	0	0	0	0	0
14	MF	(United States) USA	Ben Olsen	28	5	26+2	5	0	0	0	0	0	0
15	FW	(United States) USA	Roy Lassiter	30	18	29+1	18	0	0	0	0	0	0
16	MF	(United States) USA	Richie Williams	23	2	23+0	2	0	0	0	0	0	0
19	MF	(United States) USA	John Maessner	11	3	9+2	3	0	0	0	0	0	0

- Last updated: January 31, 2020
- Source: D.C. United 1999 Player Statistics
