= 2000 Los Angeles Galaxy season =

American soccer club season

Los Angeles Galaxy
2000 season
- Owner: Philip Anschutz (AEG)
- Head coach: Sigi Schmid
- Stadium: Rose Bowl; Titan Stadium (U.S. Open)
- Major League Soccer: Conference: 2nd Overall: 5th
- MLS Cup Playoffs: Semifinals
- U.S. Open Cup: Semifinals
- CONCACAF Champions' Cup: Champions
Home colors	Away colors

The 2000 Los Angeles Galaxy season was the club's fifth season of existence, and their fifth-consecutive season in Major League Soccer, the top division of the American soccer pyramid.

The club's season was highlighted by winning the 2000 CONCACAF Champions' Cup, becoming the second American club to ever win a CONCACAF club tournament. It was also the second major trophy that the Galaxy earned, the first being the Supporters' Shield in 1998.

== Competitions ==
=== Major League Soccer ===
==== Tables ====
===== Western Division =====
Pos	Team	Pld	W	L	T	GF	GA	GD	Pts	Qualification
1	Kansas City Wizards	32	16	7	9	47	29	+18	57	MLS Cup Playoffs
2	Los Angeles Galaxy	32	14	10	8	47	37	+10	50	MLS Cup Playoffs
3	Colorado Rapids	32	13	15	4	43	59	−16	43	MLS Cup Playoffs
4	San Jose Earthquakes	32	7	17	8	35	50	−15	29	

Source: MLS

===== Overall =====
Pos	Team	Pld	W	L	T	GF	GA	GD	Pts	Qualification
1	Kansas City Wizards (C, S)	32	16	7	9	47	29	+18	57	CONCACAF Champions' Cup
2	Chicago Fire	32	17	9	6	67	51	+16	57	CONCACAF Champions' Cup
3	MetroStars	32	17	12	3	64	56	+8	54	
4	Tampa Bay Mutiny	32	16	12	4	62	50	+12	52	
5	Los Angeles Galaxy	32	14	10	8	47	37	+10	50	
6	Dallas Burn	32	14	14	4	54	54	0	46	
7	New England Revolution	32	13	13	6	47	49	−2	45	
8	Colorado Rapids	32	13	15	4	43	59	−16	43	
9	Miami Fusion	32	12	15	5	54	56	−2	41	
10	Columbus Crew	32	11	16	5	48	58	−10	38	
11	D.C. United	32	8	18	6	44	63	−19	30	
12	San Jose Earthquakes	32	7	17	8	35	50	−15	29	

Source: MLS
Rules for classification: 1) points; 2) head-to-head record; 3) goal difference; 4) number of goals scored
(C) Champion; (S) Supporters' Shield

=== MLS Cup Playoffs ===
==== Quarterfinals ====
September 14, 2000 Game 1	Los Angeles Galaxy	1–0	Tampa Bay Mutiny	Tampa, Florida
	Vanney 61' (pen.)			Stadium: Raymond James Stadium; Attendance: 5,583

September 20, 2000 Game 2	Tampa Bay Mutiny	2–5	Los Angeles Galaxy	Pasadena, California
	Diallo 21', 67'		Hendrickson 14'; Kelly 19'; Hernández 48'; Cienfuegos 51'; Jones 85'	Stadium: Rose Bowl; Attendance: 13,581

Los Angeles Galaxy advance 6–0 on points.

==== Semifinals ====
September 29, 2000 Game 1	Los Angeles Galaxy	0–0	Kansas City Wizards	Kansas City, Missouri
				Stadium: Arrowhead Stadium; Attendance: 11,815

October 3, 2000 Game 2	Kansas City Wizards	1–1 (AET); 0–1 (ASDET)	Los Angeles Galaxy	Pasadena, California
	McKeon 29'		Jones 16'; Califf 93'	Stadium: Rose Bowl

October 6, 2000 Game 3	Los Angeles Galaxy	0–1	Kansas City Wizards	Kansas City, Missouri
			Molnar 22' (pen.)	Stadium: Arrowhead Stadium

0–1 series (SDET)
	Molnar 6'

Kansas City Wizards advance 1–0 in series overtime (SDET) after 4–4 tie on points.

=== U.S. Open Cup ===
June 14, 2000 Second round	Seattle Sounders	1–2	Los Angeles Galaxy	Fullerton, California
	Howes 48'	(Report)	Vanney 23'; Jones 90'	Stadium: Titan Stadium; Attendance: 3,063; Referee: Kevin Stott

July 25, 2000 Third round	Los Angeles Galaxy	2–0	San Diego Flash	San Diego, California
	Victorine 50'; Polic 67'	(Report)		Stadium: Douglas Stadium; Attendance: 6,118; Referee: Sergio Vega

August 9, 2000 Quarter final	San Jose Earthquakes	0–2	Los Angeles Galaxy	Fullerton, California
		(Report)	Cienfuegos 77'; George 81'	Stadium: Titan Stadium; Attendance: 4,345; Referee: Gus St. Silva

September 12, 2000 Semi final	Chicago Fire	2–1 (asdet)	Los Angeles Galaxy	Fullerton, California
	Razov 85'; Wolff 112'	(Report)	Jones 79'	Stadium: Titan Stadium; Attendance: 7,124; Referee: Sergio Vega

=== CONCACAF Champions' Cup ===
January 17, 2001 Quarterfinals	Los Angeles Galaxy (United States)	0–0 (a.e.t.) (5–3 p)	(Honduras) Real España	Los Angeles, California
UTC−8				Stadium: Los Angeles Memorial Coliseum

January 19, 2001 Semifinals	Los Angeles Galaxy (United States)	1–1 (a.e.t.) (4–2 p)	(United States) D.C. United	Los Angeles, California
UTC−8				Stadium: Los Angeles Memorial Coliseum

January 21, 2001 Final	Los Angeles Galaxy (United States)	3–2	(Honduras) Olimpia	Los Angeles, California
UTC−8	Hendrickson 36', 78'; Jones 39'		Tosello 34' (pen.) de Lima 51'	Stadium: Los Angeles Memorial Coliseum

== Statistics ==
=== Goalscorers ===
Rank	Nos	Pos	Player
1			Cobi Jones
			Greg Vanney
			Simon Elliott

== Transfers ==
Date	No.	Pos.	Player	From	Fee	Source
		MF	Peter Vagenas	UCLA Bruins		
			Sasha Victorine	UCLA Bruins		
			Adam Frye	Orange County Zodiac		
			Danny Califf	Maryland Terrapins		
			José Retiz	Santos Laguna		
