= Ben Olsen =

American soccer player, soccer coach, and sports executive (born 1977)

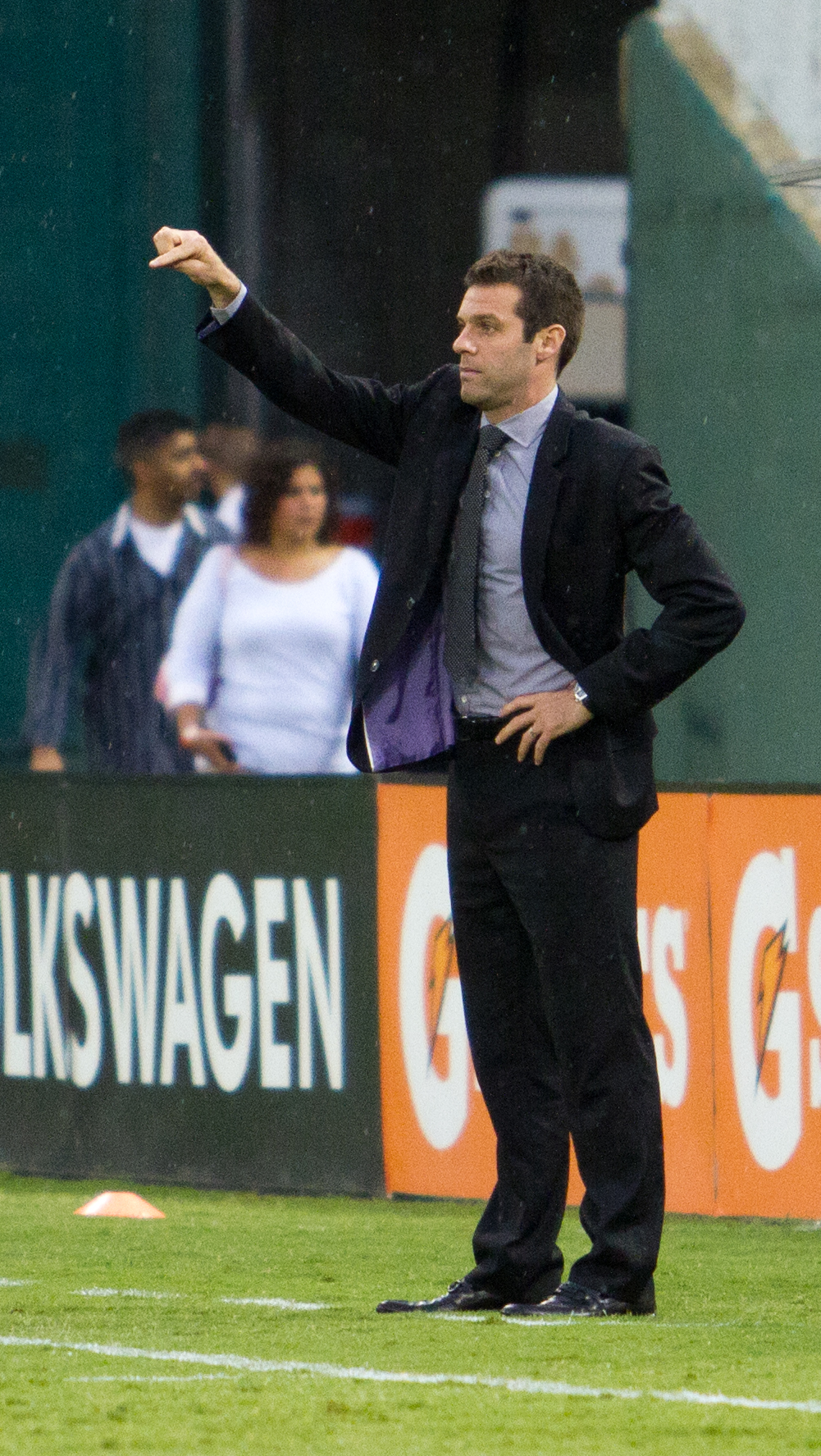
- Olsen in 2011

Personal information
- Full name: Benjamin Robert Olsen
- Date of birth: May 3, 1977 (age 49)
- Place of birth: Middletown, Pennsylvania, U.S.
- Height: 5 ft 8 in (1.73 m)
- Position: Midfielder

Team information
- Current team: Houston Dynamo (head coach)

College career
Years	Team	Apps	(Gls)
1995–1997	Virginia Cavaliers	69	(34)

Senior career*
Years	Team	Apps	(Gls)
1998–2009	D.C. United	221	(29)
2000–2001	→ Nottingham Forest (loan)	18	(2)
Total		239	(31)

International career
1998–2007	United States	37	(6)

Managerial career
- 2010–2020: D.C. United
- 2022–: Houston Dynamo
Medal record
Representing United States
Winner	CONCACAF Gold Cup	2005
Men's Soccer
- * Club domestic league appearances and goals

Benjamin Robert Olsen (born May 3, 1977) is an American soccer executive, coach and former player who is the head coach of Houston Dynamo in Major League Soccer (MLS). He is best known for his long-term association with D.C. United, first as a player then as a coach. Olsen was formerly the president of Washington Spirit in the National Women's Soccer League (NWSL).

Born in Middletown, Pennsylvania, Olsen grew up playing for FC Delco, an elite club program near Philadelphia. He then played for Virginia Cavaliers men's soccer and was named 1997 Soccer America Player of the Year.

Olsen spent the vast majority of his professional career in the United States with D.C. United in Major League Soccer, and also had a loan spell with English side Nottingham Forest. He joined United straight out of college, and over the course of 12 seasons, Olsen made 221 appearances, scoring 29 goals and making 49 assists. During that time he won two MLS Cup titles, two MLS Supporters' Shields and one U.S. Open Cup. His individual honors include two-time MLS All-Star, 1998 MLS Rookie of the Year, MLS Cup 1999 MVP and 2007 MLS Best XI.

Olsen also earned 37 caps with the United States men's national team, winning the 2005 CONCACAF Gold Cup and representing the United States at the 2006 FIFA World Cup.

Olsen announced his retirement from professional competition in 2009.

== Youth and college soccer ==
Olsen grew up in Middletown, Pennsylvania. He played his youth soccer for premier team FC Delco, where he was inducted into the club's Hall of Fame. Olsen attended Seven Sorrows of the Blessed Virgin Mary School and Middletown Area High School, where he was named Parade magazine's National High School Player of the Year in 1993.

Olsen was motivated to play college soccer at the University of Virginia because the team had just won four NCAA Division I Championships and was coached by Bruce Arena, who had previously coached Olsen when he was 14 to 15 years old. While at UVA the Cavaliers achieved two Final Fours and won two ACC Men's Soccer Tournament titles with Olsen being honored as the ACC Tournament MVP in 1997. In that same year the Cavaliers advanced to the NCAA final after Olsen scored two goals to lift the Cavaliers 3–1 over the St. Louis Billikens in the semifinal round. In his three-year career he tallied 34 goals, 41 assists and 109 total points. During his junior year he was named the 1997 Soccer America Player of the Year.

== Professional career ==
Olsen entered the league as a Project-40 player, and was allocated to D.C. United on December 27, 1997, shortly after finishing his junior season at UVA. In 1998 Olsen excelled as a right midfielder with United. During his inaugural season he earned a starting spot and scored 4 goals and made 8 assists. These accomplishments earned him the 1998 MLS Rookie of the Year Award and supported the team as it won the 1998 CONCACAF Champions Cup and 1998 InterAmerican Cup.

During Olsen's second season with United he scored five goals and made eleven assists over 26 games, which contributed to United earning the 1999 Supporters' Shield on the way to winning MLS Cup 1999. It was United's third MLS Cup victory in the first four years of the league. Olsen, the game's MVP, was especially happy to win the championship game after losing MLS Cup 1998 to the Chicago Fire.

This is real special to me to get this monkey off my back. It's nice to get the goal. I didn't think that I played that particularly well. Believe me. I'm not the MVP of this game.

— Ben Olsen, Sports Illustrated

Olsen's third season began well, but a collision with Chicago Fire goalkeeper Zach Thornton caused an ankle injury that kept Ben out of much of the second half of the season, limiting him to 13 starts and only 1 goal and 3 assists on the year. After he recovered from the ankle injury in late 2000, Olsen was loaned by United to Nottingham Forest of the English First Division, where he immediately impressed and soon became a fan favorite. As a transfer became increasingly likely, Olsen severely fractured his ankle during a December game. During his 18-month absence Olsen required four surgeries and continuous rehabilitation. He finally returned in July 2002 and was able to finish the season with 7 starts and 10 games played.

In 2003 Olsen completed a full season with United for the first time in four years. He started 26 games for the team, while scoring 4 goals and making 7 assists. Although his speed was limited due to his injuries and surgeries, Olsen was able to adapt to a new position as a center midfielder. It was here that Olsen spent his time in 2004 as well, starting 25 games for United, scoring 3 goals and 4 assists. He scored 2 goals and 4 assists in 2005.

D.C. United needed Olsen back at wide midfielder for the 2007 season, and he responded well. He served as Captain when Jaime Moreno was away on national team duty, scored his first career hat trick in a 4–2 win over New York Red Bulls on June 10, and enjoyed his best season in MLS. He ended the year with seven goals and seven assists and was named to the MLS Best XI team. Olsen had surgery on both of his ankles in Baltimore on November 5, 2007.

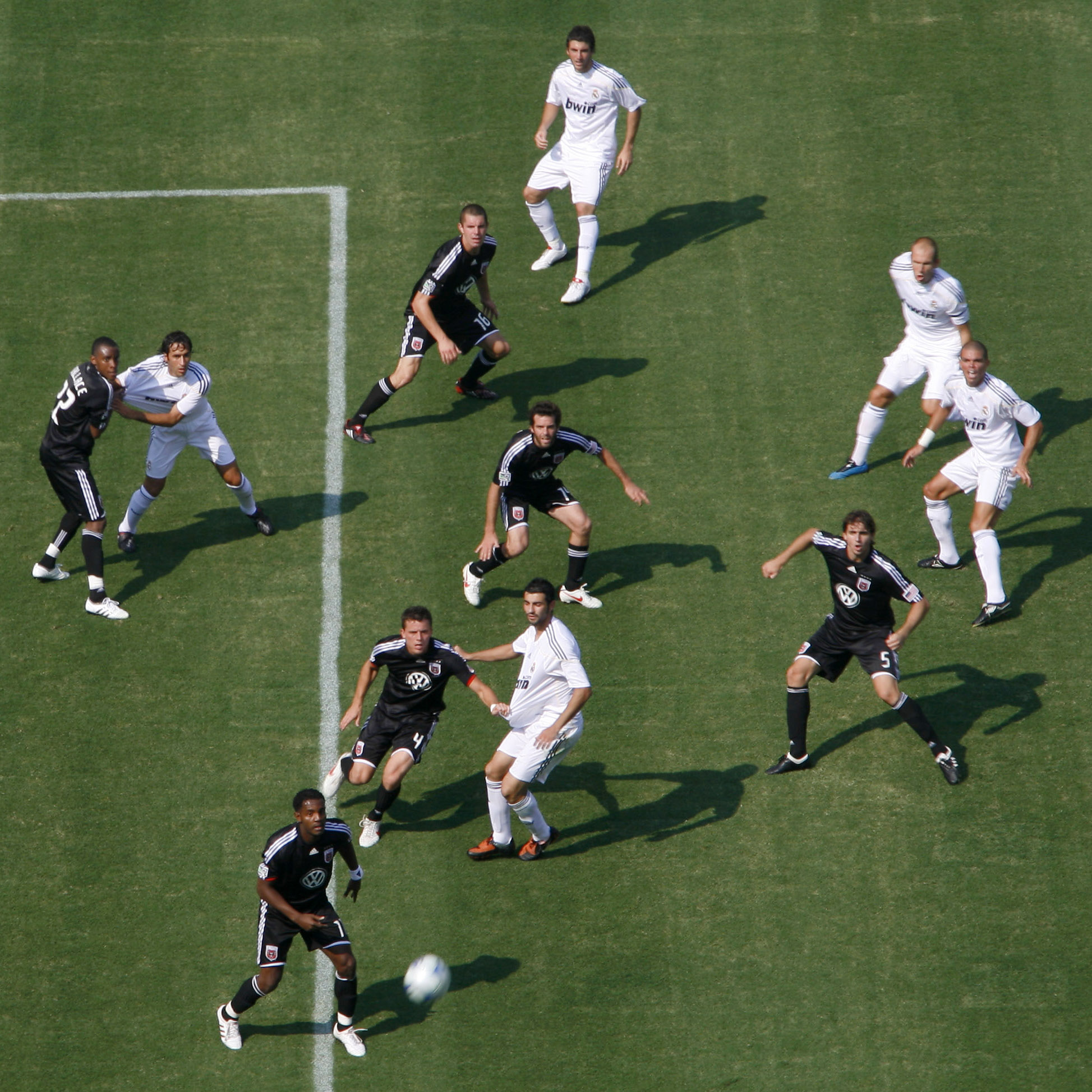
Olsen (center) defending a corner kick during an international friendly against Real Madrid in 2009 at FedExField

Ankle problems again sidelined Olsen for the beginning of the 2008 MLS season, and there was speculation that his career was in jeopardy. Despite said problems, Ben Olsen was able to make one MLS appearance against the Los Angeles Galaxy on June 28, 2008. The crowd greeted him with the loudest ovation of the day and a tifo that read "Ben Olsen" and "Heart Of A Lion". After playing just 15 minutes Olsen responded to the media by stating, "It wasn't great; I was like a wounded animal out there." On July 7, 2008, Olsen underwent another ankle surgery.

Olsen was able to continue his career during the 2009 season in a defensive midfield role, scoring the tying goal in stoppage time of a 1–1 tie with the New England Revolution. On May 2, 2009, Olsen injured himself during a game against FC Dallas, which led him to be substituted out during the second half. After skipping two matches he played against Chivas USA at the Home Depot Center on May 16, 2009. Six minutes into that match he aggravated his hamstring.

It was okay throughout the week. The difference between practice and the game, the speed of play and the demands, I thought I could handle it. Sometimes I want to play too badly.

— Ben Olsen, Soccer Insider

On July 17, 2012, United announced that Olsen would be inducted into the D.C. United Hall of Tradition before a match against the New England Revolution scheduled for September 15.

=== Retirement ===
United announced Olsen's retirement from professional competition on October 24, 2009. Only three days earlier Olsen stated in an online chat hosted by The Washington Post that he was committed to playing another year. At the time of his retirement Olsen ranked second in games played, minutes played, game-winning goals, third in assists and shots on goal for United.

His retirement prompted numerous expressions of appreciation. On the same day he announced his retirement the Washington Wizards saluted Olsen at the end of the third quarter. In his honor the Wizards announced $14 tickets to a game against the Philadelphia 76ers, which reflected Olsen's jersey number for United.

Ben Olsen has been called the heart and soul of D.C. United and, over the years, that is exactly what we've come to expect from him. Since he joined our team as the League's first Project-40 player until his last game in the 2009 season, Ben gave all that he had for his team and his teammates. You can't replace a player like Ben, you simply hope that other players can step up and shoulder the mantle that he carried for so long. He's simply one of the greatest players in D.C. United history.

— Kevin Payne, D.C. United President and CEO, DCUnited.com

== International career ==
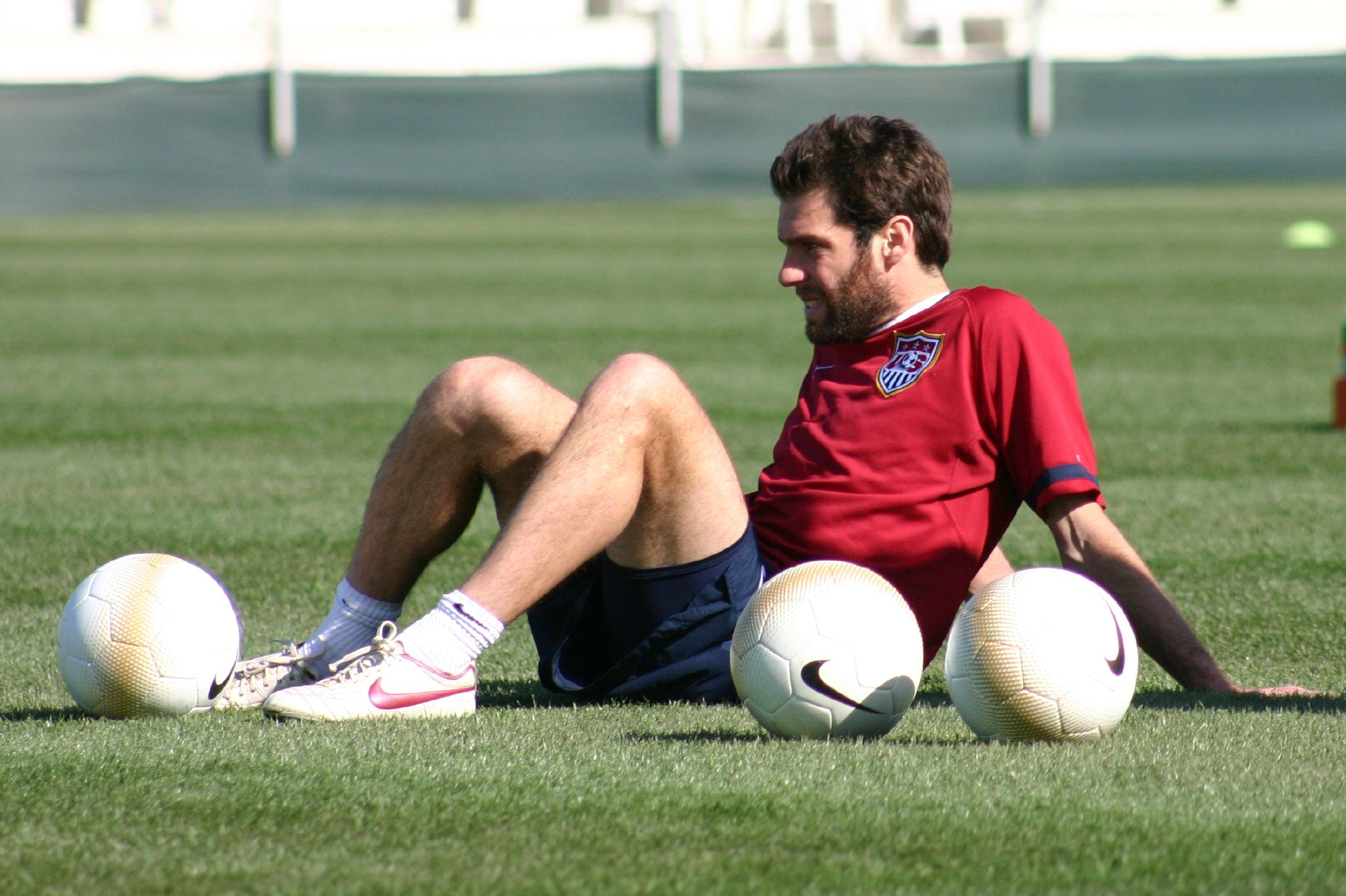
Olsen during practice at SAS Soccer Park before a match against Jamaica

Olsen at one time seemed like the right midfielder of the future for the U.S. national team, as he received his first cap soon after his Rookie of the Year season, on November 6, 1998, against Australia, and he was a significant player for the team in the 1999 season. He scored his first international goal during his first international start, which was against Chile on February 21, 1999. As the youngest player on the team. He received a cross from Brian McBride during the 58th minute. He then hit a side volley past goalie Marcelo Ramirez into the left corner of the goal. In 1999, he earned the U.S. Soccer Young Male Athlete of the Year award. However, the injuries that kept him out of club play also seriously damaged his aspirations for the national team.

Despite those injuries he was able to compete in the 2000 Summer Olympics for the United States, which placed fourth overall in the competition. Olsen's third career international goal earned the United States a tie with Tunisia during an international friendly in preparation for World Cup qualifying. He scored in injury time when John O'Brien passed him the ball after a corner kick.

After moving to a controlling midfield position, Olsen was one of the selections on Bruce Arena's 2006 FIFA World Cup roster, having scored goals in the U.S. team's early 2006 win over Guatemala and in an April tie with Jamaica. Olsen earned 35 caps in all, scoring 6 goals for the United States. Olsen made his lone World Cup appearance against Ghana in a 2–1 loss, replacing an injured Claudio Reyna.

== Coaching career ==
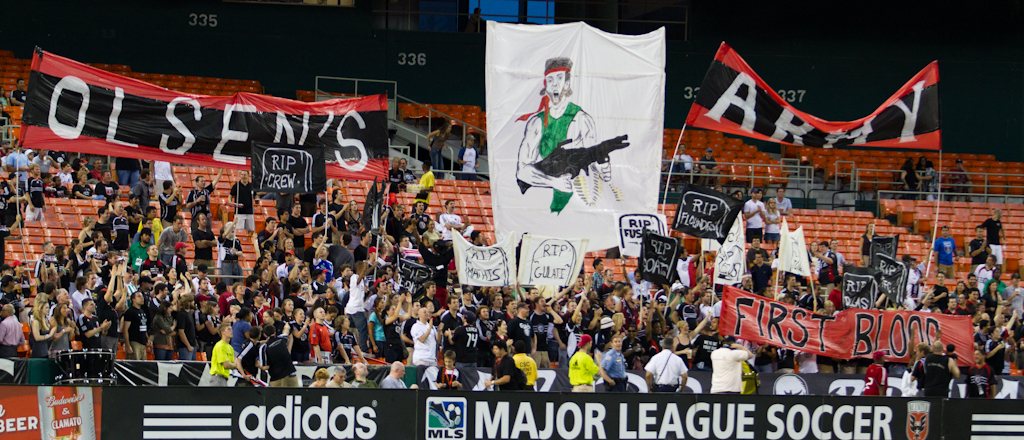
Supporters display a tifo supporting Olsen during a match against FC Dallas

On January 5, 2010, United announced that Olsen would continue to work for United as an assistant coach under head coach Curt Onalfo. On August 5, following a league-worst 3–12–3 start to the season, head coach Curt Onlafo was fired. Subsequently, Olsen was named interim head coach and completed the season with a 3–8–1 record. Although United officials interviewed at least seven candidates, including Hertha Berlin manager Lucien Favre, the club appointed Olsen to the head coaching position. United made a public announcement on November 29, 2010, and held a press conference in the same room Olsen had announced his retirement one year and one month earlier. Olsen signed a three-year guaranteed contract that made him United's seventh head coach in club history and youngest full-time head coach in the league's 15-year history. This occurred despite the fact that United President and CEO Kevin Payne had continuously ruled him out during the months leading up to the decision.

I don't think he's ready. ... It's been a great learning experience for Ben and I am sure he will learn a great deal over the next couple of years. I fully expect Ben will be our head coach someday.

— Kevin Payne, The Washington Post

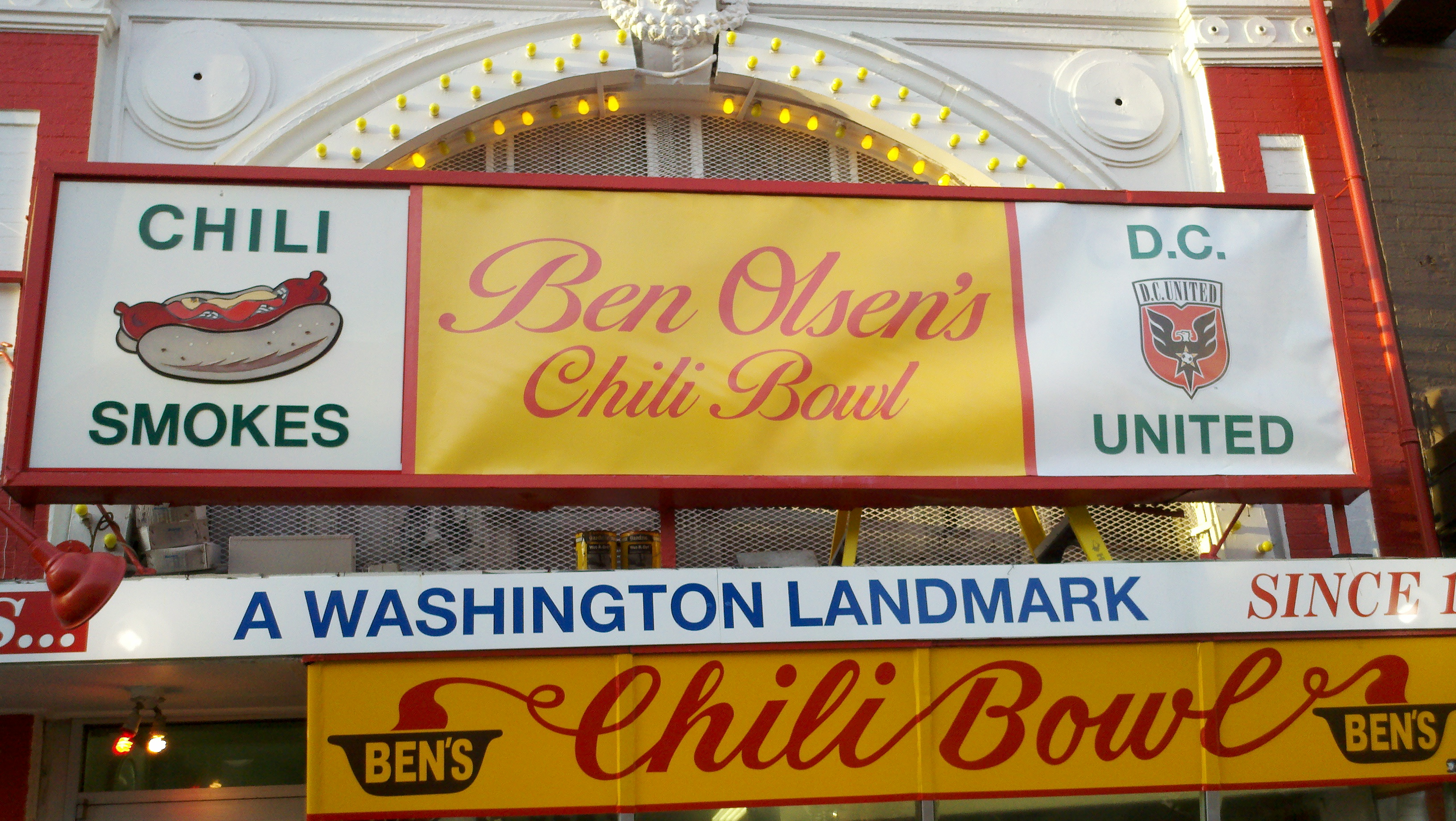
Ben's Chili Bowl sign converted for the promotional event

In a promotion for the upcoming 2011 season, United gave away free half-smokes in conjunction with Ben's Chili Bowl, which was renamed "Ben Olsen's Chili Bowl" for one hour on March 17, 2011 .

In a largely disappointing 2013 season where United was last in the Eastern Division, Olsen led the team to the 2013 Lamar Hunt U.S. Open Cup Final against Real Salt Lake. The team won on a first half stoppage time goal by Lewis Neal.

In 2014, Ben Olsen was named MLS Coach of the Year, helping D.C. United win the MLS Eastern Conference regular season title after finishing in last in 2013.

In 2019, Olsen became the youngest head coach in MLS to reach 100 wins as a manager, achieving the title at 41 years old.

On October 8, 2020, D.C. United announced that Ben Olsen departed from his role of head coach.

On November 8, 2022, Olsen was named head coach of Houston Dynamo.

== Personal life ==
Olsen is a licensed minister and presided over the nuptials of his then-teammate, Nick Rimando, in 2005. He is married to Megan Schoen, a teacher at Takoma Park Middle School. The two wed in Negril, Jamaica in December 2006. Their wedding was featured in Brides magazine. Megan gave birth to their daughter, Ruby, on September 30, 2008.

The couple later featured in a popular TV commercial for Dick's Sporting Goods, in which Olsen enjoys an impromptu soccer skills exhibition with fellow MLS players Brian Ching, Duilio Davino and Christian Gómez, before he and Megan chase their screen son, "Dawson", out of the store when he has the temerity to ask for a David Beckham jersey.

Olsen has rented out the apartment below his Northwest, Washington, D.C. town house to numerous teammates, including to D.C. United goalkeeper Zach Wells during the 2008 season.

He was featured on the North American cover of FIFA 2001.

== Career statistics ==
=== Club ===
Appearances and goals by club, season and competition
Club	Season	League			Continental		Other		Total	
Club	Season	Division	Apps	Goals	Apps	Goals	Apps	Goals	Apps	Goals
D.C. United	1998	Major League Soccer	31	4	—		6 (Note: Appearances in the MLS Cup playoffs)	0	37	4
D.C. United	1999	Major League Soccer	28	5	—		6	2	34	7
D.C. United	2000	Major League Soccer	13	1	—		—		13	1
D.C. United	2002	Major League Soccer	10	0	—		—		10	0
D.C. United	2003	Major League Soccer	26	4	—		—		26	4
D.C. United	2004	Major League Soccer	25	3	—		4	0	29	3
D.C. United	2005	Major League Soccer	23	2	2 (Note: Appearances in the Copa Sudamericana)	0	4	0	29	2
D.C. United	2006	Major League Soccer	20	2	—		3	0	23	2
D.C. United	2007	Major League Soccer	24	7	2	1	6 (Note: Appearances in the MLS Cup playoffs and North American SuperLiga)	0	32	8
D.C. United	2008	Major League Soccer	1	0	—		—		1	0
D.C. United	2009	Major League Soccer	20	1	2 (Note: Appearances in the CONCACAF Champions League)	0	—		22	1
D.C. United	Total		221	29	6	1	29	2	256	32
Nottingham Forest	2000–01	EFL Championship	18	2	—		—		18	2
Career total			239	31	6	1	29	2	274	3

=== International ===
Scores and results list the United States' goal tally first, score column indicates score after each Olsen goal.

List of international goals scored by Ben Olsen
No.	Date	Venue	Opponent	Score	Result	Competition
1	February 21, 1999	Fort Lauderdale, Florida, United States	Chile	2–1	2–1	Friendly
2	July 30, 1999	Guadalajara, Mexico	Germany	2–0	2–0	1999 FIFA Confederations Cup
3	March 12, 2000	Birmingham, Alabama, United States	Tunisia	1–1	1–1	Friendly
4	November 17, 2002	Washington, D.C., United States	El Salvador	1–0	2–0	Friendly
5	February 19, 2006	Frisco, Texas, United States	Guatemala	1–0	4–0	Friendly
6	April 11, 2006	Cary, North Carolina	Jamaica	1–1	1–1	Friendly

== Coaching statistics ==
As of match played 7 November 2026

Coaching record by club and tenure
Team	From	To	Record							
Team	From	To	G	W	D	L	GF	GA	GD	Win %
D.C. United	September 19, 2010	October 8, 2020	381	132	96	153	493	538	−45	34.65
Houston Dynamo	November 8, 2022	present	169	65	48	56	235	216	+19	38.46
Total			550	197	144	209	729	754	−25	35.82

== Honors ==
=== Player ===
D.C. United

- CONCACAF Champions' Cup: 1998
- Copa Interamericana: 1998
- MLS Cup: 1999, 2004
- MLS Supporters' Shield: 1999, 2006, 2007
- U.S. Open Cup: 2008
- MLS Eastern Conference: 1998, 1999, 2004

United States

- CONCACAF Gold Cup: 2005

Individual

- MLS Rookie of the Year: 1998
- MLS All-Star: 1998, 1999
- MLS Cup MVP: 1999
- MLS Humanitarian of the Year Award: 2003
- MLS Best XI: 2007

=== Coach ===
D.C. United

- U.S. Open Cup: 2013

Houston Dynamo

- U.S. Open Cup: 2023

Individual

- MLS Coach of the Year: 2014

== See also ==
- List of Major League Soccer coaches
- All-time D.C. United roster
