= List of Major League Soccer seasons =

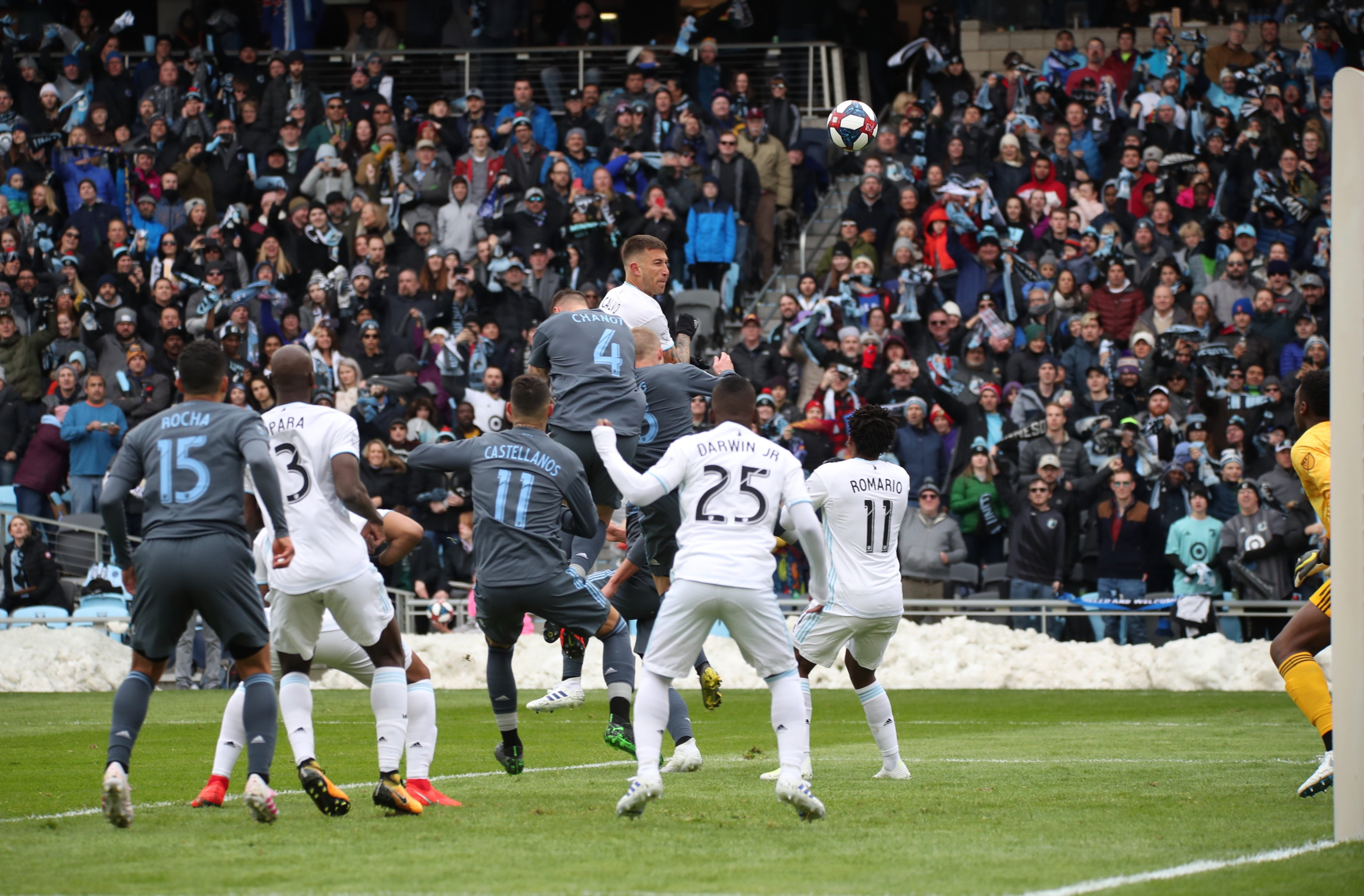
A match between Minnesota United FC and New York City FC during the 2019 regular season

Major League Soccer (MLS) is the top-flight professional men's soccer league in the United States and Canada. As of 2025, the league has 30 teams—27 in the United States and 3 in Canada—that are divided into the Eastern and Western conferences. The league schedule runs from spring to fall within a single calendar year unlike European leagues, which use a fall-to-spring schedule. Beginning in 2027, MLS will use a fall-to-spring schedule. The champion is determined by the MLS Cup and its playoffs, a postseason knockout tournament for the top teams in the regular season similar to those for other North American sports leagues. A separate trophy, the Supporters' Shield, is awarded by a fan-run organization to the team with the best record in the regular season. MLS has an average attendance of over 23,000 spectators at regular season matches and reached over 11 million total in 2024—among the highest for soccer leagues globally.

The United States was awarded the right to host the 1994 World Cup after it agreed to a FIFA mandate to create a new professional soccer league; the last league of its kind had been the North American Soccer League, which ceased operations in 1985. MLS was established in 1993 and debuted with 10 teams in the 1996 season, primarily played at large American football venues. The league added its first expansion teams in 1998 and the first soccer-specific stadium opened the following year in Columbus, Ohio. MLS had financial issues by the end of the decade as attendance and television ratings declined from their peak in the inaugural season; two teams were folded prior to the 2002 season and the league faced a potential bankruptcy. It began expanding again in 2005 and more teams built their own soccer-specific stadiums; the league reached 16 teams in 2010 and grew further to 20 teams in 2015 and 26 teams in 2020. As of 2025, 22 of the league's 30 teams play in soccer-specific stadiums that range in capacity from 18,000 to 30,000 seats, while others use larger shared venues.

MLS teams each play 34 matches during the regular season, which runs from February to October, primarily between opponents in the same conference. The league adopted an unbalanced schedule with heavier emphasis on intra-conference matches in 2012 due to the growing number of teams and the impact of travel for players. The top nine teams from each conference qualify for the MLS Cup playoffs, a five-round tournament which culminates in the MLS Cup final in early December. Teams also play in other annual competitions during the season that are organized by MLS or other entities. These include the U.S. Open Cup and Canadian Championship, the respective domestic cup championships of the United States and Canada; the Leagues Cup, which features MLS teams and Liga MX teams from Mexico; and the CONCACAF Champions Cup, the regional championship for clubs in North America, Central America, and the Caribbean.

The LA Galaxy are the most successful team in the league's history with six MLS Cup titles and four Supporters' Shields; D.C. United has four MLS Cup titles and four Supporters' Shields. The league's all-time points record was set in the 2024 season by Inter Miami CF, who had 74 points and a winning percentage of 0.765. MLS has several annual awards to recognize individual players and coaches for their accomplishments, including the Landon Donovan MVP Award for the best player in a season and the Golden Boot for the top goalscorer during the regular season. The current single-season scoring record was set by Carlos Vela, who scored 34 goals during the 2019 regular season for Los Angeles FC. MLS teams have a salary cap with exceptions for marquee players under the Designated Player Rule, which was introduced in 2007 and is used to sign international stars and young talents. Teams also have academies to develop young players and reserve squads in MLS Next Pro, the developmental league run by MLS.

== Seasons ==
Major League Soccer seasons
Season	Teams	MLS Cup playoffs		Regular season					Most valuable player	Golden Boot (Note: The Golden Boot column is sorted by number of goals scored, followed by the player's surname.)	Ref.
Season	Teams	Champion	Runners-up	Supporters' Shield	Record (Note: The record column is sorted by points per game due to the changes in the number of matches played per season.)	Pts.	MP	Avg. attendance	Most valuable player	Golden Boot	Ref.
1996	10	D.C. United	Los Angeles Galaxy	Tampa Bay Mutiny	20–12 (Note: From 1996 to 1999, the regular season and playoffs used a 35-yard shootout to decide the result of matches in lieu of draws. It was replaced by a ten-minute golden goal overtime from 2000 to 2003 that allowed for teams to draw before the standard international rules were fully adopted at the beginning of the 2004 season.)	58 (Note: From 1996 to 1999, teams were awarded three points for a win in regulation time and one point for a shootout win. It was replaced with one point for draws at the beginning of the 2000 season.)	32	17,406	Carlos Valderrama	Roy Lassiter (27)	
1997	10	D.C. United (2nd title)	Colorado Rapids	D.C. United	21–11	55	32	14,603	Preki	Jaime Moreno (16) (Note: From 1996 to 2004, the MLS Scoring Champion was determined through a combination of goals and assists; the top goalscorer is listed instead of the MLS Scoring Champion.)	
1998	12	Chicago Fire	D.C. United	Los Angeles Galaxy	24–8	68	32	14,312	Marco Etcheverry	Stern John (26)	
1999	12	D.C. United (3rd title)	Los Angeles Galaxy	D.C. United (2nd title)	23–9	57	32	14,282	Jason Kreis	Jason Kreis (18)	
2000	12	Kansas City Wizards	Chicago Fire	Kansas City Wizards	16–7–9	57	32	13,756	Tony Meola	Mamadou Diallo (26)	
2001	12	San Jose Earthquakes	Los Angeles Galaxy	Miami Fusion	16–5–5	53	26–27 (Note: The final weeks of the 2001 regular season were cancelled following the September 11 attacks; teams played only 26 or 27 matches out of their original 28-match schedule.)	14,961	Álex Pineda Chacón	Álex Pineda Chacón (19)	
2002	10	Los Angeles Galaxy	New England Revolution	Los Angeles Galaxy (2nd title)	16–9–3	51	28	15,821	Carlos Ruiz	Carlos Ruiz (24)	
2003	10	San Jose Earthquakes (2nd title)	Chicago Fire	Chicago Fire	15–7–8	53	30	14,898	Preki (2nd title)	Carlos Ruiz (15)	
2004	10	D.C. United (4th title)	Kansas City Wizards	Columbus Crew (Note: The Columbus Crew and Kansas City Wizards both finished with 49 points and a +8 goal difference; the tiebreaker used was goals scored, which Columbus won 40–38.)	12–5–13	49	30	15,559	Amado Guevara	Brian Ching (12)	
2005	12	Los Angeles Galaxy (2nd title)	New England Revolution	San Jose Earthquakes	18–4–10	64	32	15,108	Taylor Twellman	Taylor Twellman (17)	
2006	12	Houston Dynamo	New England Revolution	D.C. United (3rd title)	15–7–10	55	32	15,504	Christian Gómez	Jeff Cunningham (18)	
2007	13	Houston Dynamo (2nd title)	New England Revolution	D.C. United (4th title)	16–7–7	55	30	16,770	Luciano Emílio	Luciano Emílio (20)	
2008	14	Columbus Crew	New York Red Bulls	Columbus Crew (2nd title)	17–7–6	57	30	16,460	Guillermo Barros Schelotto	Landon Donovan (20)	
2009	15	Real Salt Lake	LA Galaxy	Columbus Crew (3rd title)	13–7–10	49	30	16,040	Landon Donovan	Jeff Cunningham (17)	
2010	16	Colorado Rapids	FC Dallas	LA Galaxy (3rd title)	18–7–5	59	30	16,675	David Ferreira	Chris Wondolowski (18)	
2011	18	LA Galaxy (3rd title)	Houston Dynamo	LA Galaxy (4th title)	19–5–10	67	34	17,872	Dwayne De Rosario	Dwayne De Rosario (16)	
2012	19	LA Galaxy (4th title)	Houston Dynamo	San Jose Earthquakes (2nd title)	19–6–9	66	34	18,807	Chris Wondolowski	Chris Wondolowski (27)	
2013	19	Sporting Kansas City (2nd title)	Real Salt Lake	New York Red Bulls	17–9–8	59	34	18,594	Mike Magee	Camilo Sanvezzo (22)	
2014	19	LA Galaxy (5th title)	New England Revolution	Seattle Sounders FC	20–10–4	64	34	19,147	Robbie Keane	Bradley Wright-Phillips (27)	
2015	20	Portland Timbers	Columbus Crew SC	New York Red Bulls (2nd title) (Note: The New York Red Bulls and FC Dallas both finished with 60 points and an identical 18–10–6 record; the Red Bulls won the Supporters' Shield using the goal difference tiebreaker.)	18–10–6	60	34	21,558	Sebastian Giovinco	Sebastian Giovinco (22)	
2016	20	Seattle Sounders FC	Toronto FC	FC Dallas	17–8–9	60	34	21,692	David Villa	Bradley Wright-Phillips (24)	
2017	22	Toronto FC	Seattle Sounders FC	Toronto FC	20–5–9	69	34	22,106	Diego Valeri	Nemanja Nikolić (24)	
2018	23	Atlanta United FC	Portland Timbers	New York Red Bulls (3rd title)	22–7–5	71	34	21,873	Josef Martínez	Josef Martínez (31)	
2019	24	Seattle Sounders FC (2nd title)	Toronto FC	Los Angeles FC	21–4–9	72	34	21,330	Carlos Vela	Carlos Vela (34)	
2020	26	Columbus Crew SC (2nd title)	Seattle Sounders FC	Philadelphia Union	14–4–5	47	18–23 (Note: On March 12, 2020, MLS play was suspended due to the COVID-19 pandemic and resumed in July with the MLS is Back Tournament at a neutral site within a bio-secure bubble. The regular season resumed in August with plans to play 23 matches; due to the cancellation of several matches for COVID-19 outbreaks, some teams played as few as 18 matches and the standings were determined by points per game.)	— (Note: The 2020 and 2021 seasons had reduced capacity at stadiums due to the COVID-19 pandemic. The league's three Canadian teams were relocated to temporary venues in the United States due to border restrictions; they returned to their home stadiums in August 2021.)	Alejandro Pozuelo	Diego Rossi (14)	
2021	27	New York City FC	Portland Timbers	New England Revolution	22–5–7	73	34	16,699	Carles Gil	Valentín Castellanos (19)	
2022	28	Los Angeles FC	Philadelphia Union	Los Angeles FC (2nd title) (Note: Los Angeles FC and the Philadelphia Union both finished with 67 points; the Supporters' Shield was awarded to Los Angeles FC based on the greater number of wins (21 to 19).)	21–9–4	67	34	21,033	Hany Mukhtar	Hany Mukhtar (23)	
2023	29	Columbus Crew (3rd title)	Los Angeles FC	FC Cincinnati	20–5–9	69	34	22,111	Luciano Acosta	Denis Bouanga (20)	
2024	29	LA Galaxy (6th title)	New York Red Bulls	Inter Miami CF	22–8–4	74	34	23,234	Lionel Messi	Christian Benteke (23)	
2025	30	Inter Miami CF	Vancouver Whitecaps FC	Philadelphia Union	20–8–6	66	34	21,988	Lionel Messi (2nd title)	Lionel Messi (29)	
2025	30	TBD	TBD	Nashville SC	23–3–8	77	34	22,063	TBA	Lionel Messi (26)	

== See also ==
- List of American and Canadian soccer champions
