= Ivan Polić =

Serbian footballer

Personal information
- Date of birth: 13 August 1973 (age 53)
- Place of birth: Kraljevo, SFR Yugoslavia
- Position: Midfielder

Senior career*
Years	Team	Apps	(Gls)
1998–2000	Radnički Niš	21	(2)
2000	LA Galaxy	12	(0)
2000	Charleston Battery	4	(1)
- * Club domestic league appearances and goals

Ivan Polić (born 13 August 1973 in Serbia) is a Serbian retired footballer.

== Career ==
At the age of 16, Polić emigrated to the United States, where he played club soccer.

In 1996, he returned to his hometown in Serbia to play for the local team in the third division. He then joined a second division side before signing for Radnički Niš in the top flight in 1997.

In 1999, Polić went back to the United States with his wife and earned a contract with LA Galaxy after training with them.
