= MLS Cup 1999 =

1999 edition of the MLS Cup

- Event: MLS Cup
Los Angeles Galaxy	D.C. United
0	2
- Date: November 21, 1999
- Venue: Foxboro Stadium, Foxborough, Massachusetts, U.S.
- MLS Cup MVP: Ben Olsen (D.C. United)
- Referee: Tim Weyland
- Attendance: 44,910
- Weather: Sunny, 63 °F (17 °C)

MLS Cup 1999 was the fourth edition of the MLS Cup, the championship match of Major League Soccer (MLS), the top-level soccer league of the United States. It took place on November 21, 1999, at Foxboro Stadium in Foxborough, Massachusetts, and was contested by D.C. United and the Los Angeles Galaxy in a rematch of the inaugural 1996 final that had been played at the same venue. Both teams finished atop their respective conferences during the regular season under new head coaches and advanced through the first two rounds of the playoffs.

United won 2–0, with first-half goals from Jaime Moreno and Ben Olsen, gaining their third MLS Cup victory in four years. Galaxy defender Robin Fraser left the match with a broken collarbone during the opening minutes and goalkeeper Kevin Hartman collided with John Maessner at the end of the half. Olsen was named the most valuable player of the match with his goal to close out the first half, which was scored off a misplayed backpass.

The final was played in front of 44,910 spectators. It was the first MLS match to be played with a standard game clock and without a tiebreaker shootout following a rule change approved by the league days earlier. The Galaxy blamed their performance on decisions by referee Tim Weyland and the quality of the pitch at Foxboro Stadium, which had a narrowed width and was damaged by an earlier National Football League game.

Both finalists qualified for the 2000 CONCACAF Champions' Cup, which was hosted in Southern California. The tournament's semifinals featured a rematch of the MLS Cup final and was decided in a penalty shootout that the Galaxy won. The Galaxy went on to win the tournament, becoming the second MLS team to do so.

== Venue ==
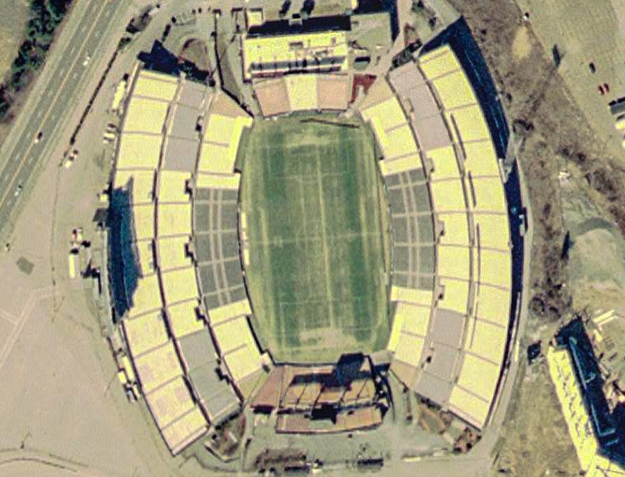
Aerial view of Foxboro Stadium, the host venue of MLS Cup 1999

The 1999 final was played at Foxboro Stadium in Foxborough, Massachusetts, where the inaugural final had been contested in 1996. MLS announced the stadium as the host venue on October 23, 1998, and the match was scheduled three weeks later than previous editions to avoid conflicting with baseball's World Series. The scheduled date of November 14 was later moved back to November 21. The match was originally planned to be hosted at Raymond James Stadium in Tampa, Florida, but issues with the Tampa Bay Mutiny's lease at the stadium led to MLS revoking their hosting rights. Foxboro was selected ahead of bids from Washington, D.C., and San Jose, California, as well as an unsubmitted speculative bid from Chicago.

The match was played six days after a home game for the New England Patriots of the National Football League, necessitating the retention of the stadium's bleacher sections. As a result, the field was narrowed from 72 yards (66 m) to 68 yards (62 m), and had visible dirt patches and yard lines. Approximately 30,000 tickets were sold before the finalists were confirmed.

== Road to the final ==
The MLS Cup is the post-season championship of Major League Soccer (MLS), a professional club soccer league based in the United States that began playing in 1996. Twelve teams contested the league's fourth season; teams were organized into two conferences, each playing 32 matches during the regular season from March to September. Teams faced opponents from the same conference four times during the regular season, and from outside their conference twice. Before the season began, MLS reduced the number of permitted international players from five to four as a cost-saving measure.

The top four teams from each conference qualified for the playoffs, which were organized into three rounds and played primarily in October. The first two rounds, named the Conference Semifinals and Conference Finals, were home-and-away series organized into a best-of-three format with a hosting advantage for the higher-seeded team. The winners of the Conference Finals advanced to the single-match MLS Cup final, which would be held at a predetermined neutral venue.

MLS Cup 1999 was contested by two-time champions D.C. United and the Los Angeles Galaxy, both of which had played in the inaugural 1996 final, which ended in a 3–2 overtime victory for United. The 1996 final had also been played at Foxboro Stadium, and the 1999 match was the fourth consecutive MLS Cup appearance for United. The 1999 final was the first to be contested by the regular season winners of both conferences. During the regular season, the Galaxy and United met twice, each winning on the road.

=== Los Angeles Galaxy ===
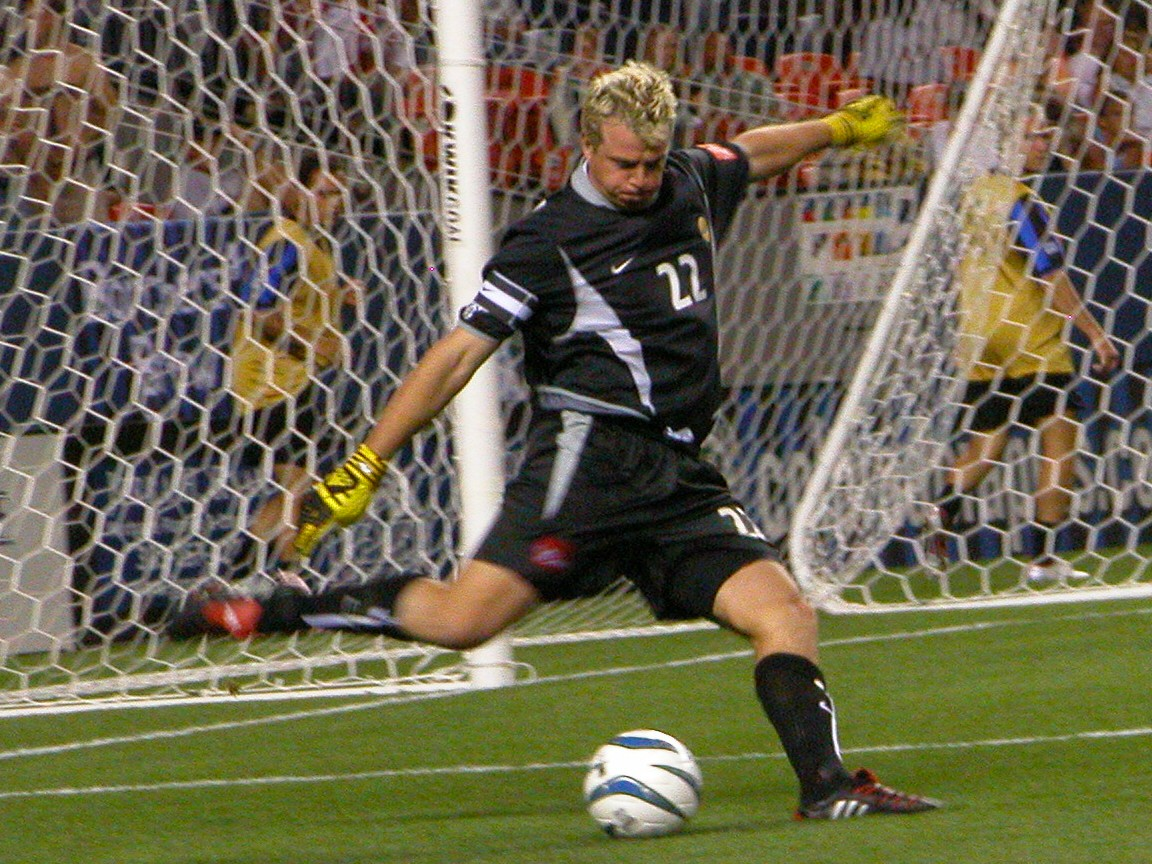
The Galaxy's Kevin Hartman was named Goalkeeper of the Year and set a league record for goals against average.

Since their MLS Cup 1996 appearance, the Los Angeles Galaxy had qualified for the playoffs twice but were eliminated in earlier rounds. During the 1998 regular season, the team finished atop the league standings with a 24–8 record, which included a run of nine consecutive wins and a record 85 goals. The Galaxy earned two shootout wins at the start of the 1999 season but then lost three consecutive matches where they scored only three goals in total. The club dismissed Zambrano on April 21 and replaced him with Sigi Schmid, who had managed UCLA Bruins for 19 years and the men's national under-20 team for two years. Under Schmid, the Galaxy won a playoff berth by early September and rose to first in the West alongside the Colorado Rapids. The team finished the season with a 20–12 record and 54 points, and became the first MLS team to allow an average of less than one goal per match during the regular season with 29 goals in 32 matches. Schmid was named Coach of the Year, Hartman earned Goalkeeper of the Year, and Robin Fraser won Defender of the Year for their regular season performances.

In the Western Conference Semifinals, the Galaxy faced the Rapids, who had finished fourth in the conference and failed to score in their last five consecutive matches. The Galaxy hosted the first leg and led with an eighth-minute strike from defender Ezra Hendrickson, but had midfielder Simon Elliott sent off with a red card ten minutes later. The team extended their lead from a penalty scored in the 52nd minute by Greg Vanney and a strike five minutes later by Mathis that Colorado goalkeeper Ian Feuer deflected into the net for a 3–0 victory. The Galaxy defeated the Rapids 2–0 at Mile High Stadium in Denver, scoring twice in the final 15 minutes through midfielders Danny Pena and Joe Franchino, to complete a two-match sweep in the series.

The Galaxy advanced to play the Western Conference Final against the Dallas Burn, who had finished second in the conference and eliminated defending champions Chicago. The Galaxy won the first leg, which was played at the Rose Bowl, 2–1 with a goal from Ezra Hendrickson that was scored with 40 seconds remaining in the match. The Galaxy twice took the lead during the second leg at the Cotton Bowl through a brace from Carlos Hermosillo but Dallas equalized to force a tie-breaking shootout. Dallas won 4–3 in the shootout, forcing a deciding third leg at the Rose Bowl. The Galaxy clinched their place in their second MLS Cup final with a 3–1 win, having taken advantage of the Burn's weakened defense in their starting lineup due to an injury and suspension. Greg Vanney scored from a penalty in the second minute, which was followed by goals from Hermosillo and Mauricio Cienfuegos to extend the lead; Jason Kreis scored a late consolation goal for Dallas.

=== D.C. United ===
D.C. United had played in the first three MLS Cup finals, winning in 1996 and 1997 against the Galaxy and Colorado Rapids, respectively. Following their loss in the 1998 final to the Chicago Fire, manager Bruce Arena left the team to join the U.S. men's national team and was replaced by New England head coach Thomas Rongen. During the early part of their season, United played without several injured starting players and reserves, forcing the starting lineup to change several times. The team also lost several players to national team call-ups during the Copa América, but was able to take first place in the Eastern Conference.

The team lost six starting players to national teams at the FIFA Confederations Cup in July. Rongen turned to a lineup of reserves, including an inexperienced four-man defense, minor-league players, and new acquisitions to secure a playoff berth in late August. The team also clinched first in the Eastern Conference in mid-September, having amassed a 15-point lead over the second-place Columbus Crew. During the regular season, United won 17 of their 20 matches against opponents in the Eastern Conference and finished atop the league with 57 points.

United played Miami Fusion, who had a 13–9 record in the regular season, in the Eastern Conference Semifinals. United won 2–0 in the first leg, which they hosted at RFK Stadium; forward Jaime Moreno scored in the 34th and 88th minutes. The second leg in Florida ended 0–0 after regulation time and was decided in a shootout that United won 3–2. Goalkeeper Tom Presthus, having stopped four goals in regulation time, made four saves during the six-round shootout.

In a repeat of the previous two Eastern Conference Finals, United played the Columbus Crew, who had defeated the Tampa Bay Mutiny. United took a lead in the series at RFK Stadium in the first leg, winning 2–1 with a strike from Moreno in the 15th minute and a volley from Ben Olsen in the 72nd minute. The second leg in Columbus ended in a 5–1 victory for the hosts, giving United their worst playoff defeat and forcing a third match in the series. Roy Lassiter scored early for United in the sixth minute but the Crew responded with first-half goals from Ansil Elcock and Jeff Cunningham, and a hat-trick from Stern John in the second half. United recovered in the third leg to win 4–0 and extended their unbeaten streak at home in the playoffs to 12 matches. Moreno scored in the 17th minute and was joined by a brace from Roy Lassiter on both sides of half-time, the latter coming from a bicycle kick in the penalty area. Marco Etcheverry, who had provided three assists on the earlier goals, scored a free kick from 23 yards (21 m) with four minutes remaining to clinch a MLS Cup final berth for United.

=== Summary of results ===
==== Regular season ====
1999 Western Conference table
Pos.	Club	Pld.	W	SW	L	Pts.
1	Los Angeles Galaxy	32	20	3	12	54
2	Dallas Burn	32	19	3	13	51
3	Chicago Fire	32	18	3	14	48
4	Colorado Rapids	32	20	6	12	48
5	San Jose Clash	32	19	10	13	37
Key: Qualified for playoffs · Supporters' Shield winner

1999 Eastern Conference table
Pos.	Club	Pld.	W	SW	L	Pts.
1	D.C. United (SS)	32	23	6	9	57
2	Columbus Crew	32	19	6	13	45
3	Tampa Bay Mutiny	32	14	5	18	32
4	Miami Fusion	32	13	5	19	29
5	New England Revolution	32	12	5	20	26
Key: Qualified for playoffs · Supporters' Shield winner

==== Playoffs ====
Note: In all results below, the score of the finalist is given first (H: home; A: away). Playoffs were in best-of-three format with penalty shootout (SO) if scores were tied.

Los Angeles Galaxy				Round	D.C. United			
Opponent	1st leg	2nd leg	3rd leg	MLS Cup Playoffs	Opponent	1st leg	2nd leg	3rd leg
Colorado Rapids (2–0)	3–0 (H)	2–0 (A)	—	Conference Semifinals	Miami Fusion (2–0)	2–0 (H)	0–0 (3–2 SO) (A)	—
Dallas Burn (2–1)	2–1 (H)	2–2 (3–4 SO) (A)	3–1 (H)	Conference Finals	Columbus Crew (2–1)	2–1 (H)	1–5 (A)	4–0 (H)

== Broadcasting and entertainment ==
The MLS Cup final was broadcast in the United States by ABC with English commentary, and Spanish commentary was available via secondary audio programming. The ABC broadcast was led by play-by-play announcer Phil Schoen and color commentator Ty Keough, who were joined by studio host Rob Stone. MLS players John Harkes and Alexi Lalas joined the pre-game and half-time broadcasts as co-hosts. ABC deployed 18 cameras for the match and added field microphones to capture crowd noise. The television broadcast on ABC drew a 1.0 national rating (approximately 1.16 million viewers), a 17 percent decline from 1998, partially due to competition from National Football League games. Pop singer Christina Aguilera sang the U.S. national anthem before the match and performed in the half-time show.

== Match ==
=== Match rules ===
The MLS Board of Governors, composed of team owners and their representatives, met in Boston before the MLS Cup to revise the league's match rules. Several of the league's experimental rules were eliminated in an effort to match international standards set by the International Football Association Board in the Laws of the Game and to appeal to hardcore fans. The countdown clock that was tracked via the stadium scoreboard was replaced with a normal match clock that was kept by the referee on the field; injury time was added at the end of each half, as displayed by the fourth official. Tiebreaker shootouts were replaced with two periods of sudden-death golden goal overtime that would be followed by a standard penalty shootout if the score remained tied. Although the shootout change was planned to take effect at the start of the 2000 season, after consulting with coaches Schmid and Rongen, league commissioner Don Garber announced the revised clock and tiebreaker would be used at MLS Cup 1999.

=== Summary ===
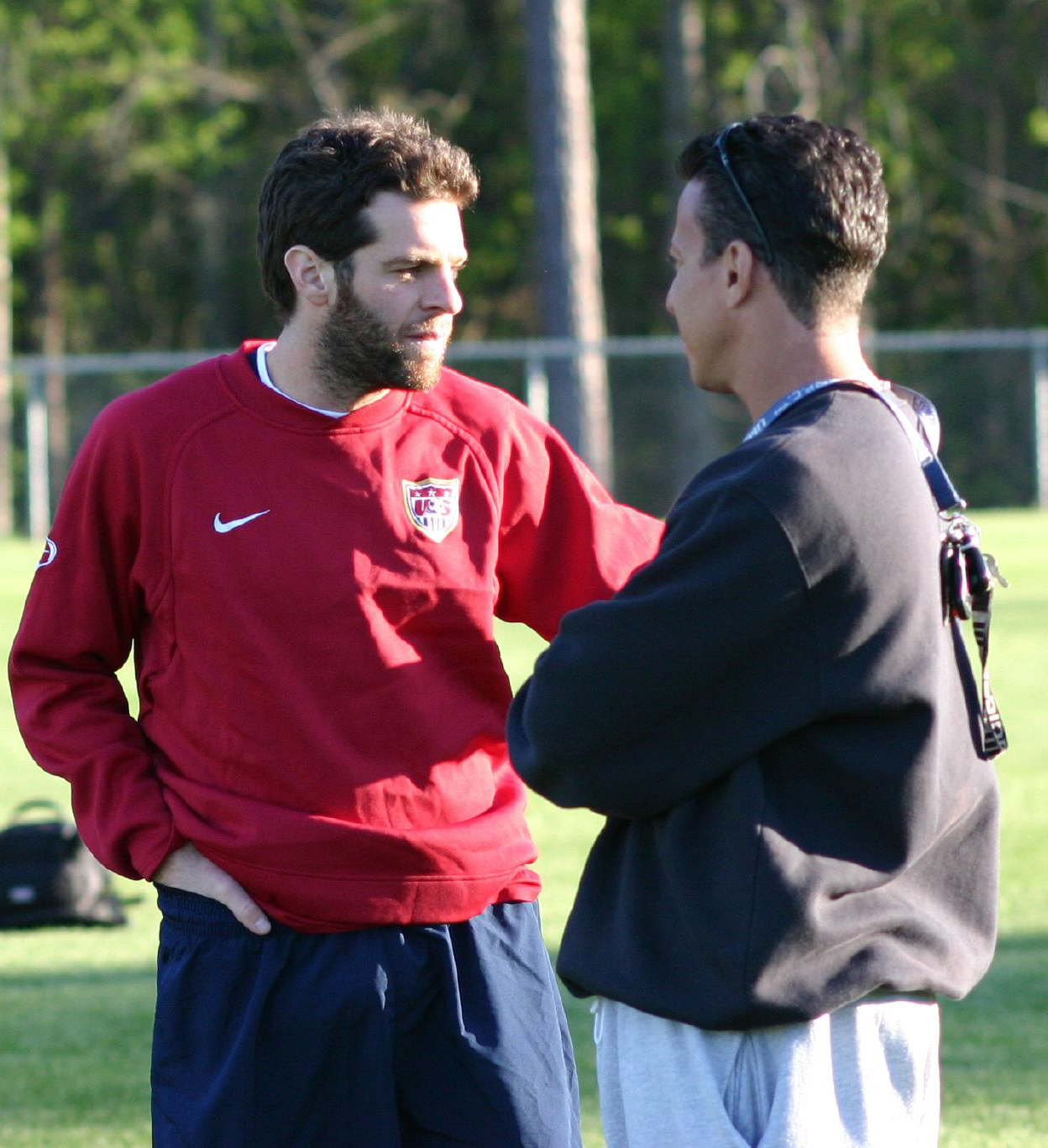
D.C. United midfielder Ben Olsen (left) was named MLS Cup MVP for his goal in the first half.

The MLS Cup final was played on November 21 in front of 44,910 spectators at Foxboro Stadium, surpassing the attendance of the previous MLS Cup at the stadium. Approximately 5,000 D.C. United fans, including the club's two largest supporters groups Barra Brava and Screaming Eagles, traveled to the match. The match began at 1:30 p.m. Eastern Time under sunny skies with a temperature of 63 °F (17 °C), unlike the cold and rainy conditions of the 1996 final. The field was described as "badly scarred" due to a National Football League game at the stadium earlier in the week, which also caused the pitch to be narrowed to 68 yards (62 m).

United took early control of the match and challenged the Galaxy defense on several plays. In the seventh minute, Galaxy defender Robin Fraser fell after being pushed from behind by Roy Lassiter on a play while challenging for the ball. Fraser left the match with a broken left collarbone and was replaced by Steve Jolley. Schmid adjusted Galaxy's defense into a three-man formation. Fraser later said he had been wearing a shoulder brace that restricted movement of his arm for most of the season, which prevented him from breaking the fall. Referee Tim Weyland did not award a foul for the play, for which Schmid and Galaxy players later criticized him.

United then attempted to take advantage of the weakened Galaxy defense as both teams pushed aggressively for an opening goal, trading several chances. United took the lead in the 19th minute on a long throw-in from Marco Etcheverry that was misplayed by Jolley and fell to Lassiter, whose shot was saved by Kevin Hartman. Caligiuri failed to clear the ball, and Jaime Moreno converted from point-blank range. The Galaxy responded with a promising scoring opportunity off a corner kick taken by Greg Vanney in the 32nd minute. Danny Pena's header hit the goalpost and John Maessner deflected it toward the goal but the ball was cleared away by Richie Williams. The Galaxy protested to Weyland that the ball had crossed the line and struck Williams' hand but no foul was given.

The Galaxy and United traded more scoring chances as the first half ended; play stopped in the 43rd minute after Maessner, who was clearing the ball, kneed Hartman in the head. Hartman returned to the match and stopped a 22-yard (20 m) volley from United defender Jeff Agoos at the beginning of stoppage time, which Weyland set at four minutes. The Galaxy immediately responded with a counterattack led by Jones, who was clipped in the penalty area by Maessner though Weyland did not award a penalty. In the third minute of stoppage time, Hartman misplayed a backpass from Jolley while under pressure from Lassiter and Moreno. Ben Olsen intercepted Hartman's pass to Caligiuri and scored from just outside the six-yard box to give United a 2–0 lead at half-time.

United looked to extend their lead in the second half but were unable to convert an early chance in the 47th minute as Lassiter headed a cross from Agoos wide of the goal. A breakaway chance in the 58th minute for Jones was thwarted by Carlos Llamosa, who tackled away a loose ball in the United penalty area. Galaxy attackers Mauricio Cienfuegos and Carlos Hermosillo were kept in check by United, particularly by defensive midfielder Richie Williams. Jones was left to attack on his own. Pena gave Galaxy two chances to score but Agoos blocked his first shot and the second went wide of the goal.

With 20 minutes left to play, the teams traded back-to-back chances that were not finished. In the 71st minute, Olsen received a chipped pass from Etcheverry and shot towards the goal but hit the side netting. A minute later, a volley by Clint Mathis in the penalty area was struck wide of the goal. Williams then attempted a 23-yard (21 m) volley in the 76th minute that struck the post after beating Hartman's outstretched arm. In the match's last major action, Caligiuri attempted a drive from inside the box but his shot went wide of the goal. With six minutes remaining, Olsen was named the MLS Cup Most Valuable Player (MVP). United goalkeeper Tom Presthus made one save during the match, on one of the Galaxy's two shots on goal.

=== Details ===
November 21, 1999
1:30 p.m.

Los Angeles Galaxy	0–2	D.C. United
	Report (Archived)	Moreno 19'; Olsen 45+3'

Foxboro Stadium, Foxborough, Massachusetts
Attendance: 44,910
Referee: Tim Weyland

Los Angeles Galaxy	D.C. United

GK	22	(United States) Kevin Hartman
RB	17	(Saint Vincent and the Grenadines) Ezra Hendrickson
CB	4	(United States) Robin Fraser (c)		(substituted off) 9'
CB	3	(United States) Greg Vanney
LB	2	(United States) Danny Pena		(substituted off) 73'
DM	20	(United States) Paul Caligiuri
RM	10	(El Salvador) Mauricio Cienfuegos
CM	21	(Costa Rica) Roy Myers	(yellow card) 90'
LM	14	(United States) Clint Mathis
SS	13	(United States) Cobi Jones	(yellow card) 24'
CF	27	(Mexico) Carlos Hermosillo
Substitutions:
DF	5	(United States) Steve Jolley	(substituted on) 9'	(substituted off) 80'
DF	7	(United States) Zak Ibsen	(substituted on) 80'
MF	12	(New Zealand) Simon Elliott	(substituted on) 73'
Manager:
(United States) Sigi Schmid

GK	22	(United States) Tom Presthus
RB	3	(United States) Carey Talley	(yellow card) 69'
CB	23	(United States) Eddie Pope
CB	18	(United States) Carlos Llamosa		(substituted off) 74'
LB	12	(United States) Jeff Agoos
DM	16	(United States) Richie Williams
RM	14	(United States) Ben Olsen	(yellow card) 53'
LM	20	(United States) John Maessner
AM	10	(Bolivia) Marco Etcheverry (c)
CF	9	(Bolivia) Jaime Moreno
CF	15	(United States) Roy Lassiter		(substituted off) 87'
Substitutions:
DF	4	(Argentina) Diego Soñora	(yellow card) 76'	(substituted on) 74'
MF	5	(Canada) Geoff Aunger	(substituted on) 87'
Manager:
(United States) Thomas Rongen

MLS Cup Most Valuable Player:
Ben Olsen (D.C. United)

Assistant referees:
Nathan Clement
Craig Lowry
Fourth official:
Brian Hall

Match rules

- 90 minutes of regulation time.
- Two 5-minute periods of extra time with golden goals to decide a winner.
- Penalty shootout from 35 yards if scores still tied.
- Maximum of three substitutions.

== Post-match ==
After winning three titles in four seasons, D.C. United were hailed as the first MLS dynasty despite the league's attempts to encourage parity among teams. Commissioner Don Garber stated he thought it was "terrific to have a dominant team" when asked whether United's performance would hurt the league but added he would "love some balance". United's players celebrated with cigars and champagne in the locker room following the near-collapse of the stage that had been set up for the trophy ceremony. Olsen became the first MLS Cup MVP to have been developed as part of the Project-40 program. On November 23, United were honored with a ten-block parade along Pennsylvania Avenue in Downtown Washington, D.C., which was attended by thousands of fans. United went on to miss the playoffs for three consecutive seasons but would win another MLS Cup in 2004 by defeating the Kansas City Wiz.

After the match, Hartman attributed his miscue on the second goal to the poor condition of the pitch, which United defender Jeff Agoos also criticized. Galaxy coach Sigi Schmid, along with Jones and Hermosillo, were fined for criticizing referee Tim Weyland's calls; Schmid was also suspended for the first match of the 2000 season. Schmid highlighted the lack of calls after Fraser's injury and two potential penalties in the first half, along with fouls throughout the match. The Galaxy reached the MLS Cup final in 2001, losing to the San Jose Earthquakes, and won their first title in 2002 against New England at Gillette Stadium, which had replaced Foxboro Stadium. As of 2022, the Los Angeles Galaxy holds the record for the most MLS Cup titles, winning their fifth in 2014 to overtake United's record.

As MLS Cup finalists, D.C. United and the Los Angeles Galaxy qualified as the U.S. representatives for the 2000 CONCACAF Champions' Cup, which was hosted in Southern California in January 2001. The two teams met in the semifinals, where the Galaxy defeated United in a penalty shootout following a 1–1 draw. The Galaxy won the tournament, becoming the second US club to win a CONCACAF competition and the last until Seattle Sounders FC in 2022. They earned a place in the 2001 FIFA Club World Championship, which was set to be played in Spain but was later cancelled amid a financing scandal.
