= John Maessner =

American soccer player (born 1969)

Personal information
- Date of birth: June 2, 1969 (age 57)
- Place of birth: Hackensack, New Jersey, United States
- Height: 5 ft 10 in (1.78 m)
- Positions: Forward; midfielder

College career
Years	Team	Apps	(Gls)
1987–1990	Virginia Cavaliers		

Senior career*
Years	Team	Apps	(Gls)
1991	Fort Lauderdale Strikers	11	(0)
1991–1992	Harrisburg Heat (indoor)	7	(?)
1992	Miami Freedom	8	(0)
1992–1993	ES La Ciotat		
1993–1994	FC Istres	1	(0)
1994–1995	Connecticut Wolves		
1995	Buffalo Blizzard (indoor)	10	(1)
1995–1996	FC Saarbrücken		
1996–1997	D.C. United	52	(3)
1998–1999	Miami Fusion	40	(0)
1999–2000	D.C. United	21	(4)
2000–2001	Tampa Bay Mutiny	48	(1)

Managerial career
- 2001: Virginia Cavaliers (assistant)
- * Club domestic league appearances and goals

John Maessner (born June 2, 1969) is an American former professional soccer player who spent six seasons in Major League Soccer, two in France, two in USISL, two in the National Professional Soccer League and one in Germany.

== Playing career ==
=== Youth ===
Maessner was born in Hackensack, New Jersey. He was a 1987 Parade Magazine High School All American soccer player. In 1987, he entered the University of Virginia where he played on the men's soccer team until 1990. In 1989, the Cavaliers won the NCAA championship. He lost much of his senior season with a broken foot, but came back in time for the post-season tournaments. Although he turned professional in 1991, he continued to work on his degree, graduating in 1992. In 1991, he was a member of the U.S. soccer at the 1991 World University Games.

=== Professional ===
On May 2, 1991, Maessner turned professional when he signed with the Fort Lauderdale Strikers of the American Professional Soccer League. He played eleven games as the Strikers went to the playoff semifinals. On September 22, 1991, the Harrisburg Heat selected Maessner in the National Professional Soccer League draft. He played only seven games for the Heat that season. In 1992, he moved south to the Miami Freedom before moving to France where he signed with fifth division ES La Ciotat. He then moved to FC Istres in the French Ligue 2. He returned to the United States in 1994 where he signed with the Connecticut Wolves in the USISL. In January 1995, he signed with the Buffalo Blizzard of the NPSL. In 1995, he returned to the Wolves for a second season before moving to Germany to play for 1. FC Saarbrücken during the 1995–96 2. Bundesliga season. On May 13, 1996, D.C. United acquired Messner from FC Saarbrücken. He played three seasons in D.C., winning the 1996 MLS Cup and 1997 MLS Cup. On November 9, 1997, the Miami Fusion selected Maessner in the 1997 MLS Expansion Draft. July 19, 1999, Miami sent Maessner back to D.C. United in exchange for Brian Kamler and future considerations. The future considerations turned out to be Roy Lassiter. On May 26, 2000, D.C. United traded Maessner, two first round picks in the 2001 MLS SuperDraft and a 2002 MLS SuperDraft second round pick to the Tampa Bay Mutiny in exchange for Raúl Díaz Arce. He spent the remainder of the 2000 season as well as the 2001 season in Tampa Bay. He retired at the end of the 2001 season.

== Coaching career ==
After retiring, Maessner returned to the University of Virginia as an assistant soccer coach. In January 2007, D.C. United named Maessner as the club's Director of Youth Development for D.C. United. Maessner is no longer with D.C. United as the technical director.

Maessner named interim head women's soccer coach at the University of Nebraska at Kearney on July 25, 2012.
