= List of Tampa Bay Mutiny seasons =

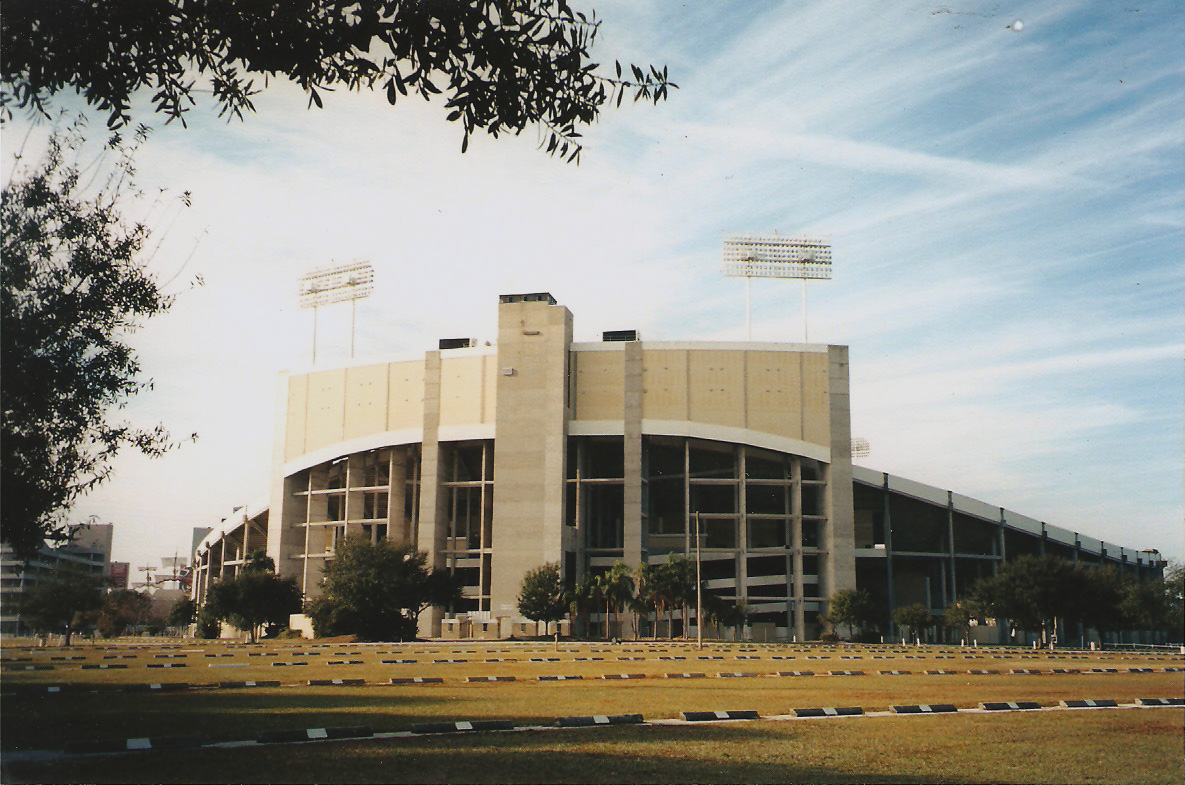
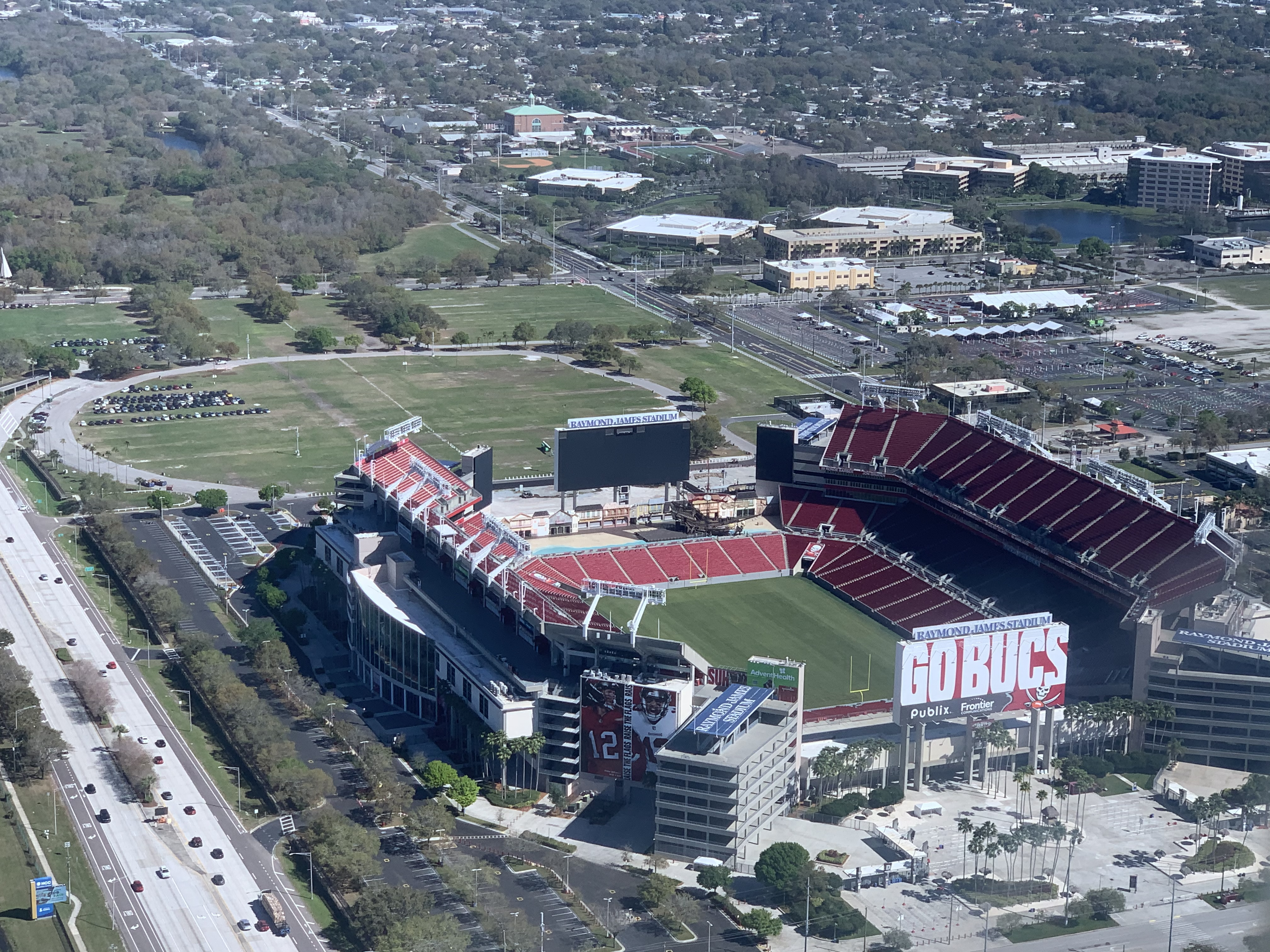
The Mutiny played in Houlihan's Stadium (left) until the end of the 1998 season, when it moved to the Raymond James Stadium (right).

The Tampa Bay Mutiny was an American soccer club that competed in Major League Soccer (MLS), the top tier soccer league in the United States and Canada. The team played for six seasons from the inaugural MLS season of 1996 through 2001, after which the franchise went defunct.

The MLS season typically runs from February to October, and the best-performing team in the regular season is awarded the Supporters' Shield. The top teams from each conference qualify for the MLS Cup Playoffs, a postseason tournament that culminates in the MLS Cup. The Mutiny won the Supporters' Shield in the inaugural season, although this was awarded retroactively as the trophy itself was not created until 1999. In addition to league play, the Mutiny competed in the annual U.S. Open Cup tournament organized by the United States Soccer Federation.

The club played a total of six seasons in MLS, with 83 wins, 98 losses, and six draws over 187 games. The club ceased operations immediately after the 2001 season along with the Miami Fusion in the league's first contraction. The Mutiny had failed to attract an investor-operator, and was run by the league at a loss. Nick Sackiewicz, a former general manager for the Mutiny, blamed the lack of fan support for the failure of both teams. The league dispersed the teams' players in the 2002 MLS SuperDraft on February 10, 2002.

== Key ==
Key to colors and symbols

1st or W	Winners
2nd or RU	Runners-up
3rd	Third place
Last †	Wooden Spoon
♦	MLS Golden Boot

Key to competitions

- Major League Soccer (MLS) – The top-flight of soccer in the United States, established in 1996.
- U.S. Open Cup (USOC) – The premier knockout cup competition in U.S. soccer, first contested in 1914.

== Seasons ==
Results of Tampa Bay Mutiny league and cup competitions by season
Season	League									Position		Playoffs	USOC	Average attendance	Top goalscorer(s) (Note: Top goalscorer includes all goals scored in regular season matches.)	
Season	Pld	W	L	D	GF	GA	GD	Pts	PPG	Conf.	Overall	Playoffs	USOC	Average attendance	Name	Goals
1996	32	20	12	– (Note: Before the 2000 Major League Soccer season, matches would be settled in a penalty kick shootout rather than end in a draw.)	66	51	+15	58	1.81	1st	1st	SF	QF	11,679	(United States) Roy Lassiter♦ (Note: Lassiter won the MLS Golden Boot (58 points).)	27
1997	32	17	15	–	55	60	–5	45	1.41	2nd	3rd	QF	QF	11,333	(United States) Roy Lassiter	10
1998	32	12	20	–	46	57	–11	34	1.06	5th	9th	DNQ	QF	10,312	(Bolivia) Mauricio Ramos	9
1999	32	14	18	–	51	50	+1	32	1.00	3rd	8th	QF	QF	13,106	(Liberia) Musa Shannon	12
2000	32	16	12	4 (Note: From 2000 to 2004, MLS discouraged draws by playing up to two 5-minute periods of golden goal overtime for tied games.)	62	50	+12	52	1.63	2nd	4th	QF	R3	9,452	(Senegal) Mamadou Diallo♦ (Note: Diallo won the MLS Golden Boot (56 points).)	26
2001 (Note: The final ten games of the 2001 MLS regular season were cancelled in the wake of the September 11 attacks, which included Tampa's game against the Columbus Crew.)	27	4	21	2	32	68	−36	14	0.52	4th †	12th †	DNQ	R2	10,479	(Senegal) Mamadou Diallo	9
Total	187	83	98	6	312	336	–24	235	1.26	W (1)	W (1)	SF (1)	QF (4)	–	(United States) Roy Lassiter	37
