= List of Major League Soccer hat-tricks =

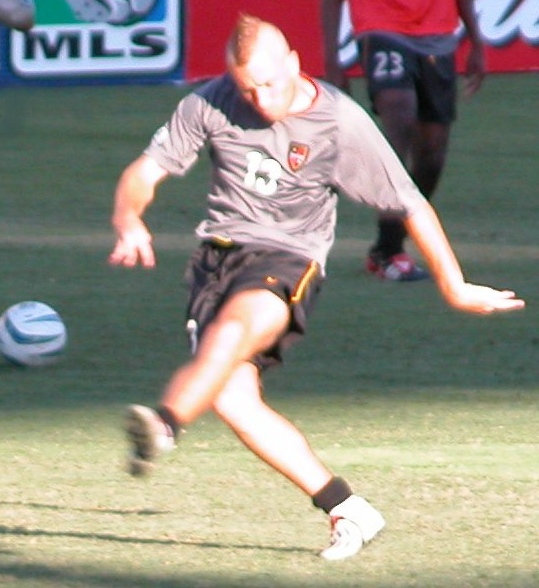
Clint Mathis scored an MLS record five goals in a game in 2000

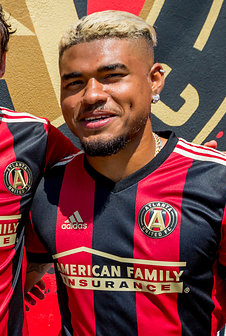
Josef Martínez has scored an MLS record seven hat-tricks

The first hat-trick, a player scoring three goals in a game, in Major League Soccer, was scored by Steve Rammel of D.C. United in their 5–2 win at the Columbus Crew on May 15, 1996.

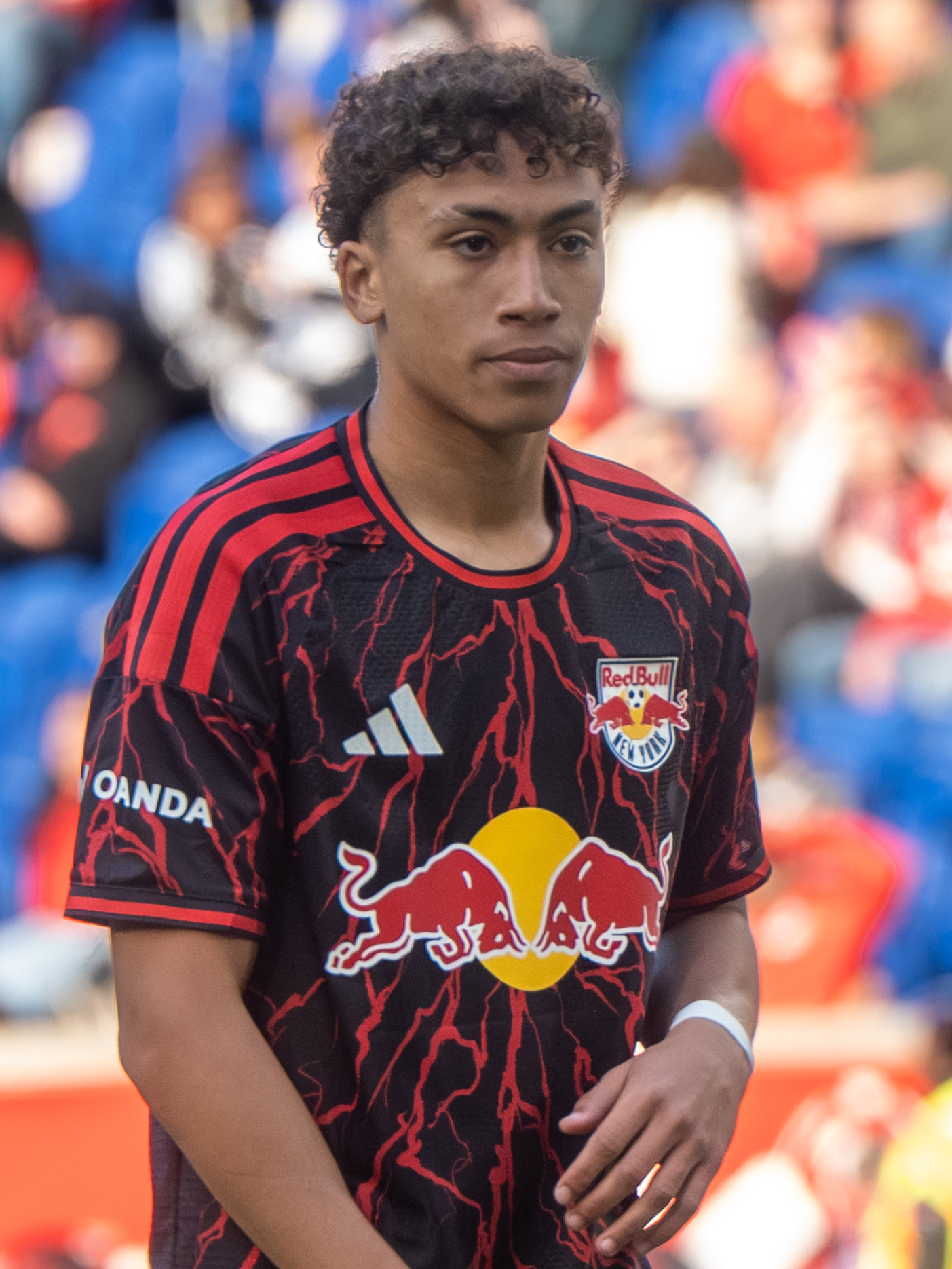
Julian Hall was the youngest player to score a hat-trick, aged 18 years and 50 days

The league's fastest hat-trick was scored in under five minutes by Harut Karapetyan of the LA Galaxy on June 4, 1998, in an 8–1 win at the Dallas Burn. The fastest hat-trick from the start of a game was scored by Hany Mukhtar of Nashville SC, who recorded three goals in the opening 16 minutes of a 5–1 victory against Chicago Fire FC on July 18, 2021 (the goals all came in a six-minute window). Clint Mathis scored the most goals in a game, when he scored five, on August 26, 2000, in a 6–4 MetroStars win over the Burn. The youngest player to score a hat-trick was Julian Hall, aged 18 years and 50 days old when he scored three for the New York Red Bulls in a 3–2 win against the Columbus Crew on May 13, 2026.

Roy Lassiter scored hat-tricks for the Tampa Bay Mutiny and D.C. United. Dante Washington scored hat-tricks for the Burn and the Crew. Mamadou Diallo scored three hat-tricks for the Mutiny and another for the MetroStars, twice scoring four goals in a game.

== Hat-tricks ==
Key
^{4}	Player scored four goals
^{5}	Player scored five goals
†	Player scored hat-trick as a substitute
*	The home team

=== 1990s ===
Note: The results column shows the scorer's team score first

Player	Nationality	For	Against	Result	Date	Ref.
Steve Rammel	United States	D.C. United	Columbus Crew*	5–2	May 15, 1996	
Giovanni Savarese	Venezuela	NY/NJ MetroStars*	Colorado Rapids	3–0	May 16, 1996	
Eduardo Hurtado	Ecuador	LA Galaxy	NY/NJ MetroStars*	4–0	June 9, 1996	
Eduardo Hurtado	Ecuador	LA Galaxy	Colorado Rapids*	3–1	June 26, 1996	
Raúl Díaz Arce^{4}	El Salvador	D.C. United	Dallas Burn*	6–1	July 7, 1996	
Cobi Jones	United States	LA Galaxy*	Tampa Bay Mutiny	3–4	July 27, 1996	
Roy Lassiter	United States	Tampa Bay Mutiny	Colorado Rapids*	3–1	August 3, 1996	
Brian Maisonneuve	United States	Columbus Crew*	Kansas City Wiz	5–1	September 7, 1996	
Raúl Díaz Arce^{4}	El Salvador	D.C. United	Colorado Rapids*	5–2	April 12, 1997	
Alberto Naveda	Argentina	New England Revolution*	NY/NJ MetroStars	3–1	May 30, 1997	
Dante Washington	United States	Dallas Burn*	San Jose Clash	3–1	July 18, 1997	
Eduardo Hurtado	Ecuador	LA Galaxy*	Tampa Bay Mutiny	6–1	September 7, 1997	
Jose Vasquez	United States	LA Galaxy	San Jose Clash*	3–2	September 21, 1997	
Stern John	Trinidad and Tobago	Columbus Crew*	Miami Fusion	5–1	April 18, 1998	
Cobi Jones	United States	LA Galaxy*	Colorado Rapids	7–4	May 6, 1998	
Musa Shannon	United States	Tampa Bay Mutiny	New England Revolution*	3–4	May 10, 1998	
Vitalis Takawira	Zimbabwe	Kansas City Wizards	New England Revolution*	3–1	May 16, 1998	
Martín Machón	Guatemala	LA Galaxy	Columbus Crew*	3–1	May 17, 1998	
Stern John	Trinidad and Tobago	Columbus Crew*	San Jose Clash	4–1	May 30, 1998	
Harut Karapetyan†	Armenia	LA Galaxy*	Dallas Burn	8–1	June 4, 1998	
Roy Lassiter	United States	D.C. United*	Chicago Fire	4–1	July 18, 1998	
Cobi Jones	United States	LA Galaxy*	Colorado Rapids	6–1	August 5, 1998	
Stern John	Trinidad and Tobago	Columbus Crew*	Kansas City Wizards	5–3	August 16, 1998	
Cobi Jones	United States	LA Galaxy	New England Revolution*	5–1	August 22, 1998	
Diego Serna	Colombia	Miami Fusion*	New England Revolution	3–2	August 30, 1998	
Preki	United States	Kansas City Wizards*	San Jose Clash	5–1	September 5, 1998	
Jason Kreis	United States	Dallas Burn*	New England Revolution	4–0	March 20, 1999	
Stern John	Trinidad and Tobago	Columbus Crew*	Miami Fusion	4–0	August 1, 1999	
Stern John	Trinidad and Tobago	Columbus Crew	MetroStars*	4–2	August 18, 1999	

=== 2000s ===
Player	Nationality	For	Against	Result	Date	Ref.
Ante Razov	United States	Chicago Fire	Miami Fusion*	3–0	May 6, 2000	
Jaime Moreno	Bolivia	D.C. United	Colorado Rapids*	5–2	May 6, 2000	
Diego Serna	Colombia	Miami Fusion	Tampa Bay Mutiny*	4–1	June 21, 2000	
Mamadou Diallo	Senegal	Tampa Bay Mutiny*	MetroStars	4–3	August 16, 2000	
Clint Mathis^{5}	United States	MetroStars	Dallas Burn*	6–4	August 26, 2000	
Mamadou Diallo	Senegal	Tampa Bay Mutiny	Columbus Crew*	4–3	August 30, 2000	
Diego Serna^{4}	Colombia	Miami Fusion*	MetroStars	4–1	September 2, 2000	
Diego Serna	Colombia	Miami Fusion	D.C. United*	6–2	September 9, 2000	
Alex Comas	Colombia	MetroStars	New England Revolution*	3–4	September 9, 2000	
Clint Mathis	United States	MetroStars*	Kansas City Wizards	4–1	May 2, 2001	
Abdul Thompson Conteh^{4}	Sierra Leone	D.C. United*	New England Revolution	5–0	May 9, 2001	
Mamadou Diallo^{4}	Senegal	Tampa Bay Mutiny*	LA Galaxy	4–4	May 9, 2001	
Diego Serna	Colombia	Miami Fusion	Dallas Burn	6–2	June 2, 2001	
Dante Washington	United States	Columbus Crew*	Tampa Bay Mutiny	6–1	June 16, 2001	
John Spencer	Scotland	Colorado Rapids*	D.C. United	3–1	July 4, 2001	
Alex Pineda Chacón	Honduras	Miami Fusion*	D.C. United	3–1	September 8, 2001	
Ante Razov	United States	Chicago Fire	New England Revolution*	3–1	May 19, 2002	
Bobby Rhine	United States	Dallas Burn*	Colorado Rapids	4–1	June 8, 2002	
Mamadou Diallo^{4}	Senegal	MetroStars*	LA Galaxy	5–0	June 15, 2002	
Chris Carrieri	United States	Colorado Rapids*	Chicago Fire	3–2	July 4, 2002	
Carlos Ruiz	Guatemala	LA Galaxy*	MetroStars	3–0	August 31, 2002	
Taylor Twellman	United States	New England Revolution*	D.C. United	3–0	September 7, 2002	
Chris Brown	United States	New England Revolution*	Chicago Fire	5–1	August 30, 2003	
Landon Donovan	United States	San Jose Earthquakes	Kansas City Wizards*	4–1	September 20, 2003	
Dwayne De Rosario	Canada	San Jose Earthquakes*	Dallas Burn	5–2	September 27, 2003	
Pat Noonan	United States	New England Revolution*	MetroStars	5–2	October 25, 2003	
Alejandro Moreno	Venezuela	LA Galaxy	D.C. United*	4–2	May 19, 2004	
Pat Noonan	United States	New England Revolution	Kansas City Wizards*	3–2	June 2, 2004	
Damani Ralph	Jamaica	Chicago Fire*	D.C. United	3–0	June 5, 2004	
Davy Arnaud	United States	Kansas City Wizards*	Dallas Burn	5–1	July 3, 2004	
Ross Paule	United States	Columbus Crew*	LA Galaxy	3–1	September 4, 2004	
Edson Buddle^{4}	United States	Columbus Crew*	MetroStars	4–2	September 18, 2004	
Amado Guevara	Honduras	MetroStars	Colorado Rapids*	3–1	April 30, 2005	
Nate Jaqua	United States	Chicago Fire*	Chivas USA	5–2	June 4, 2005	
Jeff Cunningham	United States	Colorado Rapids	Chivas USA*	3–1	June 18, 2005	
Taylor Twellman	United States	New England Revolution*	FC Dallas	3–2	July 16, 2005	
Amado Guevara	Honduras	MetroStars*	Chivas USA	3–3	August 21, 2005	
Taylor Twellman	United States	New England Revolution*	Columbus Crew	3–1	September 10, 2005	
Brian Ching^{4}	United States	Houston Dynamo*	Colorado Rapids	5–2	April 2, 2006	
Peguero Jean Philippe	Haiti	New York Red Bulls*	Chivas USA	5–4	May 20, 2006	
Edson Buddle†	United States	New York Red Bulls*	Real Salt Lake	6–0	August 26, 2006	
Amado Guevara	Honduras	New York Red Bulls*	Kansas City Wizards	3–2	October 14, 2006	
Eddie Johnson	United States	Kansas City Wizards	New England Revolution*	4–3	May 26, 2007	
Eddie Johnson	United States	Kansas City Wizards*	New York Red Bulls	3–2	June 2, 2007	
Ben Olsen	United States	D.C. United*	New York Red Bulls	4–2	June 9, 2007	
Brad Davis	United States	Houston Dynamo*	Chivas USA	4–0	June 21, 2007	
Nate Jaqua	United States	Houston Dynamo*	Real Salt Lake	4–3	September 8, 2007	
Landon Donovan	United States	LA Galaxy*	Chivas USA	5–2	April 26, 2008	
Edson Buddle	United States	LA Galaxy	FC Dallas*	5–1	May 18, 2008	
Edson Buddle	United States	LA Galaxy*	San Jose Earthquakes	3–0	June 14, 2008	
Luciano Emílio	Brazil	D.C. United*	New York Red Bulls	4–1	June 14, 2008	
Landon Donovan	United States	LA Galaxy*	D.C. United	5–2	September 20, 2008	
Conor Casey	United States	Colorado Rapids	New York Red Bulls*	5–4	September 27, 2008	
Chris Rolfe	United States	Chicago Fire*	New York Red Bulls	5–2	October 23, 2008	
Robbie Findley	United States	Real Salt Lake*	Columbus Crew SC	4–1	April 2, 2009	
Conor Casey	United States	Colorado Rapids	LA Galaxy*	3–2	April 4, 2009	
Jeff Cunningham^{4}	United States	FC Dallas*	Kansas City Wizards	6–0	August 1, 2009	
Conor Casey	United States	Colorado Rapids*	Chivas USA	4–0	August 8, 2009	
Kheli Dube	Zimbabwe	New England Revolution*	Real Salt Lake	3–1	August 23, 2009	

=== 2010s ===
Player	Nationality	For	Against	Result	Date	Ref.
Sébastien Le Toux	France	Philadelphia Union*	D.C. United	3–2	April 10, 2010	
Zack Schilawski	United States	New England Revolution*	Toronto FC	4–1	April 10, 2010	
Brian Ching	United States	Houston Dynamo*	Chicago Fire	4–3	August 21, 2010	
Blaise Nkufo	Switzerland	Seattle Sounders FC	Columbus Crew SC*	4–0	September 18, 2010	
Chris Wondolowski	United States	San Jose Earthquakes	Toronto FC*	3–2	September 25, 2010	
Chris Wondolowski†	United States	San Jose Earthquakes*	Chivas USA	3–0	October 20, 2010	
Birahim Diop	Senegal	Kansas City Wizards*	San Jose Earthquakes	4–1	October 23, 2010	
Will Bruin	United States	Houston Dynamo*	D.C. United	4–1	April 29, 2011	
Justin Braun	United States	Chivas USA	New York Red Bulls*	3–2	May 15, 2011	
Steven Lenhart	United States	San Jose Earthquakes	D.C. United*	4–2	June 11, 2011	
Sanna Nyassi	Gambia	Colorado Rapids*	New York Red Bulls	4–1	July 20, 2011	
Justin Braun	United States	Chivas USA*	Houston Dynamo	3–0	July 23, 2011	
Dwayne De Rosario	Canada	D.C. United*	Toronto FC	3–3	August 6, 2011	
Lamar Neagle	United States	Seattle Sounders FC*	Columbus Crew SC	6–2	August 27, 2011	
Charlie Davies	United States	D.C. United	Chivas USA*	3–0	September 10, 2011	
Dwayne De Rosario	Canada	D.C. United*	Real Salt Lake	4–1	September 24, 2011	
Marco Pappa	Guatemala	Chicago Fire	Real Salt Lake*	3–0	September 28, 2011	
David Estrada	Mexico	Seattle Sounders FC*	Toronto FC	3–1	March 17, 2012	
Thierry Henry	France	New York Red Bulls*	Montreal Impact	5–2	March 31, 2012	
Chris Pontius	United States	D.C. United*	New York Red Bulls	4–1	April 22, 2012	
Álvaro Saborío	Costa Rica	Real Salt Lake*	Portland Timbers	3–0	July 7, 2012	
Chris Wondolowski	United States	San Jose Earthquakes*	Real Salt Lake	5–0	July 14, 2012	
Fredy Montero	Colombia	Seattle Sounders FC	Chivas USA*	6–2	August 25, 2012	
Álvaro Saborío	Costa Rica	Real Salt Lake	Chivas USA*	4–0	September 29, 2012	
Chris Wondolowski	United States	San Jose Earthquakes	Colorado Rapids*	4–1	October 6, 2012	
Mike Magee	United States	LA Galaxy*	Chicago Fire	4–0	March 3, 2013	
Marco Di Vaio	Italy	Montreal Impact*	Philadelphia Union	5–3	May 25, 2013	
Robbie Keane	Republic of Ireland	LA Galaxy*	Seattle Sounders FC	4–0	May 26, 2013	
Álvaro Saborío	Costa Rica	Real Salt Lake	New York Red Bulls*	3–4	July 27, 2013	
Landon Donovan	United States	LA Galaxy	FC Dallas*	3–3	August 11, 2013	
Robbie Keane	Republic of Ireland	LA Galaxy*	Real Salt Lake	4–2	August 17, 2013	
Kekuta Manneh	Gambia	Vancouver Whitecaps FC	Seattle Sounders FC*	4–1	October 9, 2013	
Camilo	Brazil	Vancouver Whitecaps FC*	Colorado Rapids	3–0	October 27, 2013	
Clint Dempsey	United States	Seattle Sounders FC	Portland Timbers*	4–4	April 5, 2014	
Bradley Wright-Phillips	England	New York Red Bulls*	Houston Dynamo	4–0	April 23, 2014	
Harry Shipp	United States	Chicago Fire	New York Red Bulls*	5–4	May 10, 2014	
Bradley Wright-Phillips	England	New York Red Bulls*	Chicago Fire	4–5	May 10, 2014	
Javier Morales	Argentina	Real Salt Lake	Houston Dynamo*	5–2	May 11, 2014	
Luis Silva	United States	D.C. United	Montreal Impact*	4–2	June 11, 2014	
Tesho Akindele	Canada	FC Dallas	San Jose Earthquakes*	5–0	August 16, 2014	
Bradley Wright-Phillips	England	New York Red Bulls*	Seattle Sounders FC	4–1	September 20, 2014	
Robbie Keane	Republic of Ireland	LA Galaxy*	Toronto FC	4–0	July 4, 2015	
Sebastian Giovinco	Italy	Toronto FC	New York City FC*	4–4	July 12, 2015	
Robbie Keane	Republic of Ireland	LA Galaxy*	San Jose Earthquakes	5–2	July 17, 2015	
Cyle Larin	Canada	Orlando City SC	New York City FC*	3–5	July 26, 2015	
Sebastian Giovinco	Italy	Toronto FC*	Orlando City SC	4–1	August 5, 2015	
Didier Drogba	Ivory Coast	Montreal Impact*	Chicago Fire	4–3	September 5, 2015	
Cyle Larin	Canada	Orlando City SC	New York Red Bulls*	5–2	September 25, 2015	
Ola Kamara	Norway	Columbus Crew SC*	Real Salt Lake	4–3	May 28, 2016	
Bradley Wright-Phillips	England	New York Red Bulls*	Toronto FC	3–0	May 28, 2016	
Roland Alberg	Netherlands	Philadelphia Union*	Chicago Fire	4–3	June 22, 2016	
Didier Drogba	Ivory Coast	Montreal Impact*	Philadelphia Union	5–1	July 23, 2016	
Sebastian Giovinco	Italy	Toronto FC*	D.C. United	4–1	July 23, 2016	
Frank Lampard	England	New York City FC*	Colorado Rapids	5–1	July 30, 2016	
Sebastian Giovinco	Italy	Toronto FC*	New England Revolution	4–1	August 6, 2016	
Clint Dempsey	United States	Seattle Sounders FC	Orlando City SC*	3–1	August 7, 2016	
Patrick Mullins	United States	D.C. United*	Chicago Fire	6–2	August 27, 2016	
Mauro Manotas	Colombia	Houston Dynamo*	Portland Timbers	3–1	September 24, 2016	
Josef Martínez	Venezuela	Atlanta United FC	Minnesota United FC*	6–1	March 12, 2017	
Erick Torres	Mexico	Houston Dynamo*	New York Red Bulls	4–1	April 1, 2017	
C. J. Sapong	United States	Philadelphia Union*	New York Red Bulls	3–0	May 6, 2017	
Justin Meram	Iraq	Columbus Crew SC	Montreal Impact*	3–2	May 13, 2017	
Gerso Fernandes	Guinea-Bissau	Sporting Kansas City*	Seattle Sounders FC	3–0	May 17, 2017	
Miguel Almirón	Paraguay	Atlanta United FC*	Houston Dynamo	4–1	May 20, 2017	
Roland Lamah	Belgium	FC Dallas*	Real Salt Lake	6–2	June 3, 2017	
David Accam	Ghana	Chicago Fire*	Orlando City SC	4–0	June 24, 2017	
David Villa	Spain	New York City FC*	New York Red Bulls	3–2	August 6, 2017	
Kei Kamara	Sierra Leone	New England Revolution*	Orlando City SC	4–0	September 2, 2017	
Josef Martínez	Venezuela	Atlanta United FC*	New England Revolution	7–0	September 13, 2017	
Josef Martínez	Venezuela	Atlanta United FC*	Orlando City SC	3–3	September 16, 2017	
Patrick Mullins^{4}	United States	D.C. United*	San Jose Earthquakes	4–0	September 23, 2017	
Justin Morrow	United States	Toronto FC*	New York Red Bulls	4–2	September 30, 2017	
Nemanja Nikolić	Hungary	Chicago Fire*	Philadelphia Union	3–2	October 15, 2017	
Josef Martínez	Venezuela	Atlanta United FC*	Vancouver Whitecaps FC	4–1	March 17, 2018	
Dominique Badji	Senegal	Colorado Rapids*	Philadelphia Union	3–0	March 31, 2018	
Johnny Russell	Scotland	Sporting Kansas City*	Vancouver Whitecaps FC	6–0	April 20, 2018	
Ignacio Piatti	Argentina	Montreal Impact*	Los Angeles FC	3–5	April 21, 2018	
Cristian Techera	Uruguay	Vancouver Whitecaps FC*	New England Revolution	3–3	May 26, 2018	
Josef Martínez	Venezuela	Atlanta United FC*	Philadelphia Union	3–1	June 2, 2018	
Adama Diomande	Norway	Los Angeles FC*	Philadelphia Union	4–1	June 30, 2018	
Darwin Quintero	Colombia	Minnesota United FC*	Toronto FC	4–3	July 4, 2018	
Josef Martínez	Venezuela	Atlanta United FC*	D.C. United	3–1	July 21, 2018	
Michael Barrios	Colombia	FC Dallas	Sporting Kansas City*	3–2	July 28, 2018	
Zlatan Ibrahimović	Sweden	LA Galaxy*	Orlando City SC	4–3	July 29, 2018	
Luciano Acosta	Argentina	D.C. United*	Orlando City SC	3–2	August 12, 2018	
Damir Kreilach	Croatia	Real Salt Lake*	LA Galaxy	6–2	September 1, 2018	
Bradley Wright-Phillips	England	New York Red Bulls	D.C. United*	3–3	September 16, 2018	
Gyasi Zardes	United States	Columbus Crew SC*	Minnesota United FC	3–2	October 28, 2018	
Wayne Rooney	England	D.C. United*	Real Salt Lake	5–0	March 16, 2019	
Krisztián Németh	Hungary	Sporting Kansas City*	Montreal Impact	7–1	March 30, 2019	
Carlos Vela	Mexico	Los Angeles FC	San Jose Earthquakes*	5–0	March 30, 2019	
Diego Rossi	Uruguay	Los Angeles FC	D.C. United*	4–0	April 6, 2019	
Chris Wondolowski^{4}	United States	San Jose Earthquakes*	Chicago Fire	4–1	May 18, 2019	
Johnny Russell	Scotland	Sporting Kansas City*	Seattle Sounders FC	3–2	May 26, 2019	
Zlatan Ibrahimović	Sweden	LA Galaxy*	Los Angeles FC	3–2	July 19, 2019	
Kei Kamara	Sierra Leone	Colorado Rapids*	Montreal Impact	6–3	August 3, 2019	
Zlatan Ibrahimović	Sweden	LA Galaxy*	Sporting Kansas City	7–2	September 15, 2019	
Alexandru Mitriță	Romania	New York City FC*	Atlanta United FC	4–1	September 25, 2019	
Carlos Vela	Mexico	Los Angeles FC*	Colorado Rapids	3–1	October 6, 2019	

=== 2020s ===
Player	Nationality	For	Against	Result	Date	Ref.
Ayo Akinola	Canada	Toronto FC	Montreal Impact	4–3	July 16, 2020	
Diego Rossi^{4}	Uruguay	Los Angeles FC	LA Galaxy	6–2	July 18, 2020	
Santiago Mosquera	Colombia	FC Dallas*	Colorado Rapids	4–1	September 16, 2020	
Sergio Santos	Brazil	Philadelphia Union*	Toronto FC	5–0	October 24, 2020	
Taty Castellanos	Argentina	New York City FC*	New York Red Bulls	5–2	November 1, 2020	
Javier Hernández	Mexico	LA Galaxy*	New York Red Bulls	3–2	April 25, 2021	
Hany Mukhtar	Germany	Nashville SC*	Chicago Fire FC	5–1	July 17, 2021	
Ricardo Pepi	United States	FC Dallas*	LA Galaxy	4–0	July 24, 2021	
Ola Kamara	Norway	D.C. United*	Chicago Fire FC	3–0	September 15, 2021	
Javier Eduardo López	Mexico	San Jose Earthquakes*	Real Salt Lake	3–4	September 15, 2021	
Brian White	United States	Vancouver Whitecaps FC*	San Jose Earthquakes	3–0	October 2, 2021	
Cristian Arango	Colombia	Los Angeles FC	FC Dallas*	3−2	October 20, 2021	
Carlos Vela	Mexico	Los Angeles FC*	Colorado Rapids	3−0	February 26, 2022	
Lewis Morgan	Scotland	New York Red Bulls	Toronto FC*	4−1	March 5, 2022	
Jesús Ferreira	United States	FC Dallas*	Portland Timbers	4−1	March 19, 2022	
Leonardo Campana	Ecuador	Inter Miami CF*	New England Revolution	3−2	April 9, 2022	
Taty Castellanos^{4}	Argentina	New York City FC*	Real Salt Lake	6−0	April 17, 2022	
Cristian Espinoza	Argentina	San Jose Earthquakes*	Seattle Sounders FC	4−3	April 23, 2022	
Ronaldo Cisneros	Mexico	Atlanta United FC*	Chicago Fire FC	4–1	May 7, 2022	
Brenner	Brazil	FC Cincinnati*	New York City FC	4–4	June 29, 2022	
Taxiarchis Fountas	Greece	D.C. United	Orlando City SC*	5–3	July 4, 2022	
Julián Carranza	Argentina	Philadelphia Union*	D.C. United	7–0	July 8, 2022	
Gonzalo Higuaín	Argentina	Inter Miami CF*	FC Cincinnati	4–4	July 30, 2022	
Gyasi Zardes	United States	Colorado Rapids*	Minnesota United FC	4–3	August 6, 2022	
Julián Carranza	Argentina	Philadelphia Union	D.C. United*	6–0	August 20, 2022	
Dániel Gazdag	Hungary	Philadelphia Union*	Colorado Rapids	6–0	August 27, 2022	
Hany Mukhtar	Germany	Nashville SC*	Colorado Rapids	4–1	August 31, 2022	
Juanjo Purata	Mexico	Atlanta United FC*	Toronto FC	4–2	September 10, 2022	
Brenner	Brazil	FC Cincinnati*	San Jose Earthquakes	6–0	September 10, 2022	
Moussa Djitté†	Senegal	Austin FC*	Real Salt Lake	3–0	September 14, 2022	
Daniel Ríos^{4}	Mexico	Charlotte FC*	Philadelphia Union	4–0	October 1, 2022	
Brenner	Brazil	FC Cincinnati	D.C. United*	5–2	October 9, 2022	
Dániel Gazdag	Hungary	Philadelphia Union*	Toronto FC	4–0	October 9, 2022	
Jordan Morris^{4}	United States	Seattle Sounders FC	Sporting Kansas City*	4–1	March 25, 2023	
Denis Bouanga	Gabon	Los Angeles FC*	Austin FC	3–0	April 8, 2023	
Mikael Uhre	Denmark	Philadelphia Union*	Toronto FC	4–2	April 22, 2023	
Hany Mukhtar	Germany	Nashville SC*	Chicago Fire FC	3–0	May 6, 2023	
Hany Mukhtar	Germany	Nashville SC*	St. Louis City SC	3–1	June 17, 2023	
Cucho Hernández	Colombia	Columbus Crew	CF Montréal*	4–2	September 2, 2023	
Cucho Hernández	Colombia	Columbus Crew*	Chicago Fire FC	3–0	September 20, 2023	
Billy Sharp	England	LA Galaxy*	Minnesota United FC	4–3	September 20, 2023	
Christian Benteke	Belgium	D.C. United*	New York Red Bulls	3–5	September 23, 2023	
Denis Bouanga	Gabon	Los Angeles FC*	Minnesota United FC	5–1	October 4, 2023	
Teemu Pukki^{4}	Finland	Minnesota United FC*	LA Galaxy	5–2	October 7, 2023	
Christian Benteke	Belgium	D.C. United*	New England Revolution	3–1	February 24, 2024	
Giorgos Giakoumakis	Greece	Atlanta United FC*	New England Revolution	4–1	March 9, 2024	
Lewis Morgan	Scotland	New York Red Bulls*	Inter Miami CF	4–0	March 23, 2024	
Cristian Arango	Colombia	Real Salt Lake*	St. Louis City SC	3−1	March 30, 2024	
Luis Suárez	Uruguay	Inter Miami CF*	New York Red Bulls	6–2	May 4, 2024	
Sam Surridge	England	Nashville SC*	CF Montréal	4–1	May 4, 2024	
Christian Benteke	Belgium	D.C. United	Atlanta United FC*	3–2	May 11, 2024	
Federico Bernardeschi	Italy	Toronto FC*	CF Montréal	5–1	May 18, 2024	
Alonso Martínez†	Costa Rica	New York City FC*	San Jose Earthquakes	5–1	May 31, 2024	
Cristian Arango	Colombia	Real Salt Lake*	Austin FC	5−1	June 1, 2024	
Yuya Kubo†	Japan	FC Cincinnati	San Jose Earthquakes*	4–2	June 15, 2024	
Petar Musa	Croatia	FC Dallas*	Minnesota United FC	5–3	June 19, 2024	
Djordje Mihailovic	United States	Colorado Rapids	St. Louis City SC*	3–0	June 19, 2024	
Cucho Hernández	Colombia	Columbus Crew*	Sporting Kansas City	4–0	June 22, 2024	
Sebastián Ferreira	Paraguay	Houston Dynamo FC	D.C. United*	4–1	June 22, 2024	
Mateusz Bogusz	Poland	Los Angeles FC*	Colorado Rapids	3–0	June 29, 2024	
Brian White	United States	Vancouver Whitecaps FC*	St. Louis City SC	4–3	June 29, 2024	
Tai Baribo	Israel	Philadelphia Union*	New England Revolution	5–1	July 17, 2024	
Dániel Gazdag	Hungary	Philadelphia Union*	Nashville SC	3–0	July 20, 2024	
Albert Rusnák	Slovakia	Seattle Sounders FC	Columbus Crew*	4–0	September 7, 2024	
Alexandru Mățan	Romania	Columbus Crew*	New England Revolution	4–0	October 12, 2024	
Lionel Messi†	Argentina	Inter Miami CF*	New England Revolution	6–2	October 19, 2024	
Tai Baribo	Israel	Philadelphia Union*	FC Cincinnati	4–1	March 1, 2025	
Josef Martínez	Venezuela	San Jose Earthquakes*	D.C. United	6–1	April 6, 2025	
Brian White^{4}	United States	Vancouver Whitecaps FC*	Austin FC	5–1	April 12, 2025	
Sam Surridge^{4}	England	Nashville SC*	Chicago Fire FC	7–2	April 26, 2025	
Martín Ojeda	Argentina	Orlando City SC*	New England Revolution	3–3	May 10, 2025	
Tom Barlow	United States	Chicago Fire FC	D.C. United*	7–1	June 7, 2025	
João Klauss	Brazil	St. Louis City SC*	LA Galaxy	3–3	June 14, 2025	
Sam Surridge	England	Nashville SC	New England Revolution*	3–2	June 25, 2025	
Milan Iloski^{4}	United States	San Diego FC	Vancouver Whitecaps FC*	5–3	June 25, 2025	
Alonso Martínez	Costa Rica	New York City FC	FC Dallas*	4–3	July 25, 2025	
Danny Musovski	North Macedonia	Seattle Sounders FC*	Sporting Kansas City	5–2	August 24, 2025	
Idan Toklomati	Israel	Charlotte FC*	Inter Miami CF	3–0	September 13, 2025	
Diego Rossi	Uruguay	Columbus Crew	Atlanta United FC*	5–4	September 13, 2025	
Denis Bouanga	Gabon	Los Angeles FC	San Jose Earthquakes*	4–2	September 13, 2025	
Thomas Müller	Germany	Vancouver Whitecaps FC*	Philadelphia Union	7–0	September 13, 2025	
Son Heung-min	South Korea	Los Angeles FC	Real Salt Lake*	4–1	September 17, 2025	
Denis Bouanga	Gabon	Los Angeles FC*	Real Salt Lake	4–1	September 21, 2025	
Joseph Paintsil	Ghana	LA Galaxy*	Sporting Kansas City	4–1	September 27, 2025	
Lionel Messi	Argentina	Inter Miami CF	Nashville SC*	5–2	October 18, 2025	
Petar Musa	Croatia	FC Dallas*	San Diego FC	3–3	March 14, 2026	
Sam Surridge	England	Nashville SC*	Orlando City SC	5–0	March 21, 2026	
Denis Bouanga	Gabon	Los Angeles FC*	Orlando City SC	6–0	April 4, 2026	
Tai Baribo	Israel	D.C. United	New York Red Bulls*	4–4	April 22, 2026	
Martín Ojeda	Argentina	Orlando City SC	Inter Miami CF*	4–3	May 2, 2026	
Evander	Brazil	FC Cincinnati	Chicago Fire FC*	3–2	May 2, 2026	
Hannes Wolf	Austria	New York City FC*	Columbus Crew	3–0	May 10, 2026	
Julian Hall	United States	New York Red Bulls*	Columbus Crew	3–2	May 13, 2026	
Hany Mukhtar	Germany	Nashville SC*	Los Angeles FC	3–2	May 17, 2026	
Prince Owusu	Ghana	CF Montréal	D.C. United*	4–4	May 23, 2026	
Milan Iloski	United States	Philadelphia Union	Inter Miami CF*	4–6	May 24, 2026	
Luis Suárez	Uruguay	Inter Miami CF*	Philadelphia Union	6–4	May 24, 2026	
Alhassan Yusuf	Nigeria	New England Revolution	D.C. United*	3–0	August 19, 2026	
Lionel Messi^{4}	Argentina	Inter Miami CF*	CF Montréal	7–1	August 29, 2026	
Josh Sargent	United States	Toronto FC*	Chicago Fire FC	4–4	September 5, 2026	
Vincent Janssen	Netherlands	Portland Timbers*	Minnesota United FC	5–4	September 5, 2026	
Bruno Damiani	Uruguay	Philadelphia Union*	FC Cincinnati	5–0	September 9, 2026	
Milan Iloski	United States	Philadelphia Union*	Orlando City SC	4–2	September 26, 2026	
Carlo Holse	Denmark	St. Louis City SC*	LA Galaxy	6–2	October 11, 2026	
Liel Abada†	Israel	Charlotte FC*	CF Montréal	4–0	October 28, 2026	

== Multiple hat-tricks ==
The following table lists the number of hat-tricks scored by players who have scored two or more hat-tricks. This list does not include playoff hat-tricks. Players whose names are in bold are still currently active in Major League Soccer. Players whose names are in italics no longer play in the league, but are still active players. As of October 11, 2026.

Rank	Player	Hat-tricks
1	(Venezuela) **Josef Martínez**	7
2	(Gabon) **Denis Bouanga**	5
2	(Trinidad and Tobago) Stern John	5
2	(Germany) **Hany Mukhtar**	5
2	(Colombia) Diego Serna	5
2	(United States) Chris Wondolowski	5
2	(England) Bradley Wright-Phillips	5
8	(United States) Edson Buddle	4
8	(Senegal) Mamadou Diallo	4
8	(United States) Landon Donovan	4
8	(Italy) Sebastian Giovinco	4
8	(United States) Cobi Jones	4
8	(Republic of Ireland) Robbie Keane	4
8	(England) **Sam Surridge**	4
15	(Colombia) Cristian Arango	3
15	(Israel) **Tai Baribo**	3
15	(Belgium) Christian Benteke	3
15	(Brazil) Brenner	3
15	(United States) Conor Casey	3
15	(Canada) Dwayne De Rosario	3
15	(Hungary) **Dániel Gazdag**	3
15	(Honduras) Amado Guevara	3
15	(Colombia) Cucho Hernández	3
15	(Ecuador) Eduardo Hurtado	3
15	(Sweden) Zlatan Ibrahimović	3
15	(United States) **Milan Iloski**	3
15	(Argentina) **Lionel Messi**	3
15	(Uruguay) Diego Rossi	3
15	(Costa Rica) Álvaro Saborío	3
15	(United States) Taylor Twellman	3
15	(Mexico) Carlos Vela	3
15	(United States) **Brian White**	3
33	(United States) Justin Braun	2
33	(Argentina) Julián Carranza	2
33	(Argentina) Taty Castellanos	2
33	(United States) Brian Ching	2
33	(United States) Jeff Cunningham	2
33	(United States) Clint Dempsey	2
33	(El Salvador) Raúl Díaz Arce	2
33	(Ivory Coast) Didier Drogba	2
33	(United States) Nate Jaqua	2
33	(United States) Eddie Johnson	2
33	(Sierra Leone) Kei Kamara	2
33	(Norway) Ola Kamara	2
33	(Canada) Cyle Larin	2
33	(United States) Roy Lassiter	2
33	(Costa Rica) **Alonso Martínez**	2
33	(United States) Clint Mathis	2
33	(Scotland) **Lewis Morgan**	2
33	(United States) Patrick Mullins	2
33	(Croatia) **Petar Musa**	2
33	(United States) Pat Noonan	2
33	(Argentina) **Martín Ojeda**	2
33	(United States) Ante Razov	2
33	(Uruguay) **Luis Suárez**	2
33	(United States) Dante Washington	2
33	(United States) Gyasi Zardes	2

== Hat-tricks by nationality ==
The following table lists the number of hat-tricks scored by players from a single nation. This list does not include playoff hat-tricks. As of October 28, 2026.

Rank	Nation	Hat-tricks
1	United States	88
2	Colombia	17
3	Argentina	15
4	England	12
5	Mexico	10
6	Venezuela	9
7	Brazil	8
8	Canada	7
8	Senegal	7
8	Uruguay	7
11	Germany	6
11	Italy	6
13	Costa Rica	5
13	Gabon	5
13	Hungary	5
13	Israel	5
13	Scotland	5
13	Trinidad and Tobago	5
19	Belgium	4
19	Ecuador	4
19	Honduras	4
19	Republic of Ireland	4
23	Croatia	3
23	Ghana	3
23	Guatemala	3
23	Norway	3
23	Sierra Leone	3
23	Sweden	3
29	Denmark	2
29	El Salvador	2
29	France	2
29	Gambia	2
29	Greece	2
29	Ivory Coast	2
29	Netherlands	2
29	Paraguay	2
29	Romania	2
29	Zimbabwe	2
39	Armenia	1
39	Austria	1
39	Bolivia	1
39	Finland	1
39	Guinea-Bissau	1
39	Haiti	1
39	Iraq	1
39	Jamaica	1
39	Japan	1
39	Nigeria	1
39	North Macedonia	1
39	Poland	1
39	Slovakia	1
39	South Korea	1
39	Spain	1
39	Switzerland	1

== Hat-tricks by team ==
The following table lists the number of hat-tricks scored by the different MLS teams. This list does not include playoff hat-tricks. As of October 28, 2026.

Rank	Team	Hat-tricks total	Hat-tricks home	Hat-tricks away	Notes
1	LA Galaxy	28	20	8	
2	D.C. United	23	14	9	
3	New York Red Bulls	19	14	5	7 hat-tricks as MetroStars
4	Columbus Crew	17	12	5	
5	Philadelphia Union	15	13	2	
6	Los Angeles FC	14	8	6	
7	FC Dallas	12	10	2	3 hat-tricks as Dallas Burn
8	Colorado Rapids	11	7	4	
8	New England Revolution	11	9	2	
8	San Jose Earthquakes	11	7	4	
11	Atlanta United FC	10	9	1	
11	Chicago Fire FC	10	5	5	
11	Sporting Kansas City	10	8	2	6 hat-tricks as Kansas City Wizards
14	Nashville SC	9	8	1	
14	Seattle Sounders FC	9	3	6	
16	Houston Dynamo FC	8	7	1	
16	New York City FC	8	7	1	
16	Real Salt Lake	8	5	3	
16	Toronto FC	8	6	2	
20	Inter Miami CF	7	6	1	
20	Vancouver Whitecaps FC	7	6	1	
22	† Miami Fusion	6	3	3	
23	FC Cincinnati	5	2	3	
23	CF Montréal	5	2	3	4 hat-tricks as Montreal Impact
23	† Tampa Bay Mutiny	5	2	3	
26	Orlando City SC	4	3	1	
27	Charlotte FC	3	3	0	
28	† Chivas USA	2	1	1	
28	Minnesota United FC	2	2	0	
28	St. Louis City SC	2	2	0	
31	Austin FC	1	1	0	
31	Portland Timbers	1	1	0	
31	San Diego FC	1	0	1	

† Defunct team

== Hat-tricks in MLS Cup playoffs ==
Key
*	The home team

Player	Nationality	For	Against	Result	Date	Ref.
Raúl Díaz Arce	El Salvador	D.C. United*	Tampa Bay Mutiny	4–1	October 10, 1996	
Stern John	Trinidad and Tobago	Columbus Crew*	D.C. United	5–1	November 7, 1999	
Landon Donovan	United States	LA Galaxy*	Real Salt Lake	5–0	November 9, 2014	
Sebastian Giovinco	Italy	Toronto FC	New York City FC*	5–0	November 6, 2016	
Jordan Morris	United States	Seattle Sounders FC*	FC Dallas	4–3 (a.e.t.)	October 19, 2019	
Elias	Brazil	New York Red Bulls*	Charlotte FC	5–2	October 25, 2023	
Ryan Gauld	Scotland	Vancouver Whitecaps FC*	Portland Timbers	5–0	October 23, 2024	
Tadeo Allende	Argentina	Inter Miami CF*	New York City FC	5–1	November 29, 2025	
