= 2001 Tampa Bay Mutiny season =

Tampa Bay Mutiny
2001 season
- Coach: (Spain) Alfonso Mondelo, then (United States) Perry Van der Beck
- Stadium: Raymond James Stadium
- Major League Soccer: 12th
- U.S. Open Cup: Round of 32
- Top goalscorer: (Senegal) Mamadou Diallo (9)
- Highest home attendance: 20,730 (July 4 v. MetroStars)
- Lowest home attendance: 4,286 (August 29 v. Dallas)
- Average home league attendance: 10,479
| Home colors | Away colors | Third colors |

The 2001 Tampa Bay Mutiny season was the club's seventh year of existence, as well as their sixth season in Major League Soccer, and their sixth consecutive season in the top-flight of American soccer. It was also the Mutiny's last season, and the last season of pro soccer in Tampa Bay until 2010, when FC Tampa Bay joined the USSF Division 2 Professional League.

In addition to several international friendlies, the Mutiny and other MLS clubs participated in three matches of an 18-game Spring Training tournament in South Florida. Tampa Bay began the 2001 regular season by winning two of their first three games before entering the worst slump in franchise history. After a two-month winless streak, head coach Alfonso Mondelo was fired and former Tampa Bay Rowdies player Perry Van der Beck took over for the team's last 11 games. On September 9 the Mutiny played their last ever match, a 2–1 home loss to the Columbus Crew; The Mutiny still had several games scheduled, but the MLS regular season was cut short after the terrorist attacks of September 11, 2001, and the Mutiny did not qualify for the playoffs.

Despite renewing their lease with Raymond James Stadium for at least five more years, Don Garber and the MLS were unable to find new ownership for the Mutiny and the team was contracted in January 2002.

== Final standings ==
| Central Division | GP | W | L | D | GF | GA | GD | Pts |
|---|---|---|---|---|---|---|---|---|
| x – Chicago Fire | 27 | 16 | 6 | 5 | 50 | 30 | 20 | 53 |
| x – Columbus Crew | 26 | 13 | 7 | 6 | 49 | 36 | 13 | 45 |
| x – Dallas Burn | 26 | 10 | 11 | 5 | 48 | 47 | 1 | 35 |
| Tampa Bay Mutiny | 27 | 4 | 21 | 2 | 32 | 68 | −36 | 14 |

x – clinched playoff berth

== Preseason ==
| January 19, 2001 Int'l Friendly | Tampa Bay Mutiny (United States) | 2–2 | (Scotland) Celtic F.C. | Tampa, Florida |
| 7:30 P.M. (EST) | Ralston 15'; Lagos 31' | Report | Johnson 53'; Thompson 60' | Stadium: Pepin-Rood Stadium; Attendance: 2,917 |

| February 9, 2001 friendly | Tampa Bay Mutiny | 3–0 | United States U-18 | Bradenton, Florida |
| 11:00 A.M. (EST) | Curtis; Kartes; Trittschuh | Report | | Stadium: IMG Soccer Academy |

| February 10, 2001 friendly | Tampa Bay Mutiny | 2–2 | Miami Fusion | Fort Myers, Florida |
| 4:00 P.M. (EST) | Magee 36'; Ralston 55' | Report | Wélton 18'; Sahaydak 54' | Stadium: Gateway Community Park; Attendance: 1,000 (est.) |

| February 15, 2001 friendly | Chicago Fire | 5–0 | Tampa Bay Mutiny | Bradenton, Florida |
| 11:00 A.M. (EST) | Nowak 1' (pen.), 42'; Bocanegra 11'; Wolyniec 23'; George 38' | Report | | Stadium: IMG Soccer Academy |

| February 17, 2001 friendly | Chicago Fire | 1–0 | Tampa Bay Mutiny | Tampa, Florida |
| 1:30 P.M. (EST) | Lavrinenko 54' | Report | | Stadium: Shimburg Park |

| February 23, 2001 Int'l Friendly | Millonarios Fútbol Club (Colombia) | 2–2 | (United States) Tampa Bay Mutiny | Bogotá, Colombia |
| | Pérez 15'; Castro 65' | Report | Ralston 11'; Kartes 55' | Stadium: Estadio El Campín; Attendance: 12,000 |

| February 25, 2001 Int'l Friendly | Soacha FC (Colombia) | 3–0 | (United States) Tampa Bay Mutiny | Colombia |
| | Goal | Report |

| March 1, 2001 friendly | Tampa Spartans | 0–1 | Tampa Bay Mutiny | Tampa, Florida |
| 7:00 P.M. (EST) | | Report | Bojovic 71' | Stadium: Pepin-Rood Stadium |

| March 3, 2001 friendly | Tampa Bay Mutiny | 3–0 | United States U-17 | Brandon, Florida |
| 11:00 A.M. (EST) | Badeio 39'; McCarty 55'; Addo 80' | Report | | Stadium: JC Handly Sports Complex |

| March 8, 2001 friendly | South Florida Bulls | 1–3 | Tampa Bay Mutiny | Tampa, Florida |
| 7:00 P.M. (EST) | Paroulek 5' | Report | Ralston 33'; Schneider 55'; Curtis 68' | Stadium: USF Soccer Stadium |

| March 10, 2001 friendly | Cocoa Expos | 0–1 | Tampa Bay Mutiny | Cocoa, Florida |
| 7:00 P.M. (EST) | | Report | Demmin 23' | Stadium: Cocoa Municipal Stadium |

| March 16, 2001 MLS Spring Training | San Jose Earthquakes | 1–2 | Tampa Bay Mutiny | Fort Lauderdale, Florida |
| 6:00 P.M. (EST) | Lagos 25' | Report | Keller 47' (pen.); Diallo 78' (pen.) | Stadium: Lockhart Stadium; Attendance: 3,000 |

| March 17, 2001 scrimmage | San Jose Earthquakes | 3–3 | Tampa Bay Mutiny | Fort Lauderdale, Florida |
| | | Report | Schneider; Kartes; Curtis |

| March 20, 2001 MLS Spring Training | LA Galaxy | 2–2 | Tampa Bay Mutiny | Fort Lauderdale, Florida |
| 6:00 P.M. (EST) | Califf 39'; Thomas 83' | Report | Schneider 78'; Valderrama 90+3' (pen.) | Stadium: Lockhart Stadium |

| March 21, 2001 scrimmage | D.C. United | 1–1 | Tampa Bay Mutiny | Sunrise, Florida |
| | | Report | Bankov | Stadium: Sunrise Hilton Complexes |

| March 24, 2001 MLS Spring Training | Miami Fusion | 2–3 | Tampa Bay Mutiny | Fort Lauderdale, Florida |
| 8:00 P.M. (EST) | Serna 60', 66'; Cassar (red card) 90' | Report | Njoku 17'; Diallo 45' (pen.), (red card) 71'; Schneider 90+' (pen.) | Stadium: Lockhart Stadium; Attendance: 4,200 |

| March 27, 2001 friendly | Tampa Bay Mutiny | 4–0 | Cocoa Expos | Largo, Florida |
| 7:00 P.M. (EST) | Trittschuh, Schneider; Njoku | Report | | Stadium: Largo United Soccer Complex |

| March 30, 2001 friendly | Plant City All-Stars | 0–4 | Tampa Bay Mutiny | Plant City, Florida |
| 7:30 P.M. (EST) | | Report 1 Report 2 | Diallo 17', 45'; Kartes; Curtis | Stadium: Otis Andrews Field; Attendance: 1,000 (est.) |

| May 17, 2001 Int'l Friendly | Tampa Bay Mutiny (United States) | 0–2 | (England) Fulham F.C. | Tampa, Florida |
| 7:00 P.M. (EST) | | Report 1 Report 2 | Betsy 3', 42' | Stadium: Pepin-Rood Stadium; Attendance: 2,311 |

== Regular season ==
| Overall | | | | | | | | Home | | | | | | Away | | | | | |
| Pld | W | D | L | GF | GA | GD | Pts | W | D | L | GF | GA | GD | W | D | L | GF | GA | GD |
|---|---|---|---|---|---|---|---|---|---|---|---|---|---|---|---|---|---|---|---|
| 27 | 4 | 2 | 21 | 32 | 68 | −36 | 14 | 2 | 2 | 10 | 18 | 28 | −10 | 2 | 0 | 11 | 14 | 40 | −26 |

Last updated: July 22, 2014.
Source: Match reports

| April 7, 2001 | Dallas Burn | 2–4 | Tampa Bay Mutiny | Dallas, Texas |
| | Rodríguez 16', 26' | Report | Ralston 14'; Addo 21'; Curtis 51'; Diallo 55' | Stadium: Cotton Bowl; Attendance: 15,124 |

| April 14, 2001 | Tampa Bay Mutiny | 1–2 | Columbus Crew | Tampa, Florida |
| | Ralston 67' | Report | West 12'; Perez 62' | Stadium: Raymond James Stadium; Attendance: 16,823 |

| April 21, 2001 | MetroStars | 1–3 | Tampa Bay Mutiny | East Rutherford, New Jersey |
| | Comas 37' | Report | Ralston 74'; Keller 78'; Curtis 93' | Stadium: Giants Stadium; Attendance: 17,253 |

| April 28, 2001 | Tampa Bay Mutiny | 0–1 | Chicago Fire | Tampa, Florida |
| | | Report | Wolff 11' | Stadium: Raymond James Stadium; Attendance: 10,602 |

| May 5, 2001 | Chicago Fire | 2–0 | Tampa Bay Mutiny | Chicago, Illinois |
| | Kovalenko 51'; Wynalda 73' | Report | | Stadium: Soldier Field; Attendance: 13,123 |

| May 9, 2001 | Tampa Bay Mutiny | 4–4 | LA Galaxy | Tampa, Florida |
| | Diallo 15', 16', 37', 78' | Report | Mullan 1', 92'; Victorine 3'; Vanney 62' | Stadium: Raymond James Stadium; Attendance: 6,056 |

| May 12, 2001 | Colorado Rapids | 2–1 | Tampa Bay Mutiny | Denver, Colorado |
| | Spencer 69', 80' | Report | Diallo 74' | Stadium: Mile High Stadium; Attendance: 13,052 |

| May 19, 2001 | Miami Fusion | 3–1 | Tampa Bay Mutiny | Ft. Lauderdale, Florida |
| | Preki 34'; Mastroeni 38'; Serna 75' | Report | Valderrama 26' | Stadium: Lockhart Stadium; Attendance: 12,412 |

| May 26, 2001 | Tampa Bay Mutiny | 0–4 | Miami Fusion | Tampa, Florida |
| | | Report | Rooney 20'; Henderson 26'; Serna 67', 90' | Stadium: Raymond James Stadium; Attendance: 12,988 |

| June 2, 2001 | Tampa Bay Mutiny | 1–2 | Kansas City Wizards | Tampa, Florida |
| | Trittschuh 11' | Report | Gomez 20'; Lassiter 52' | Stadium: Raymond James Stadium; Attendance: 9,834 |

| June 6, 2001 | Tampa Bay Mutiny | 0–1 | Dallas Burn | Tampa, Florida |
| | | Report | Kreis 15' | Stadium: Raymond James Stadium; Attendance: 5,834 |

| June 9, 2001 | New England Revolution | 3–0 | Tampa Bay Mutiny | Foxborough, Massachusetts |
| | Harris 21', 32'; Torres 64' | Report | | Stadium: Foxboro Stadium; Attendance: 15,468 |

| June 16, 2001 | Columbus Crew | 6–1 | Tampa Bay Mutiny | Columbus, Ohio |
| | Washington 29', 73', 85'; Duhaney 39'; Cunningham 68', 76' | Report | Quill 55' | Stadium: Columbus Crew Stadium; Attendance: 19,128 |

| June 23, 2001 | Tampa Bay Mutiny | 3–2 | D.C. United | Tampa, Florida |
| | Ralston 8'; Diallo 23'; Barclay 42' | Report | Moreno 52'; Armstrong 91' | Stadium: Raymond James Stadium; Attendance: 9,232 |

| June 30, 2001 | Kansas City Wizards | 3–0 | Tampa Bay Mutiny | Kansas City, Missouri |
| | Gomez 11'; Brown 16'; McKeon 70' | Report | | Stadium: Arrowhead Stadium; Attendance: 10,529 |

| July 4, 2001 | Tampa Bay Mutiny | 1–2 | MetroStars | Tampa, Florida |
| | Diallo 27' | Report | Walsh 85'; Butler 93' | Stadium: Raymond James Stadium; Attendance: 20,730 |

| July 7, 2001 | Tampa Bay Mutiny | 2–3 | Chicago Fire | Tampa, Florida |
| | Keller 51'; Quill 93' | Report | Wynalda 46', 83'; Stoichkov 79' | Stadium: Raymond James Stadium; Attendance: 8,583 |

| July 14, 2001 | San Jose Earthquakes | 2–1 | Tampa Bay Mutiny | San Jose, California |
| | Lagos 4', 92' | Report | Diallo 71' | Stadium: Spartan Stadium; Attendance: 7,065 |

| July 18, 2001 | Dallas Burn | 3–0 | Tampa Bay Mutiny | Dallas, Texas |
| | Kreis 36'; Graziani 49'; Rodríguez 53' | Report | | Stadium: Cotton Bowl; Attendance: 7,119 |

| July 21, 2001 | Tampa Bay Mutiny | 1–2 | Colorado Rapids | Tampa, Florida |
| | Ralston 43' | Report | Bravo 11', 20' | Stadium: Raymond James Stadium; Attendance: 9,425 |

| August 4, 2001 | Tampa Bay Mutiny | 2–0 | San Jose Earthquakes | Tampa, Florida |
| | Keller 23'; Pena 35' | Report | | Stadium: Raymond James Stadium; Attendance: 11,064 |

| August 11, 2001 | Chicago Fire | 3–1 | Tampa Bay Mutiny | Chicago, Illinois |
| | Wynalda 46', 50'; Nowak 70' | Report | Maessner 17' | Stadium: Soldier Field; Attendance: 20,677 |

| August 18, 2001 | LA Galaxy | 5–1 | Tampa Bay Mutiny | Pasadena, California |
| | Vanney 18'; Addo 21' (o.g.); Victorine 29', 81'; Jones 79' | Report | Ralston 4' | Stadium: Rose Bowl; Attendance: 12,115 |

| August 26, 2001 | Tampa Bay Mutiny | 0–0 | New England Revolution | Tampa, Florida |
| | | Report | | Stadium: Raymond James Stadium; Attendance: 11,345 |

| August 29, 2001 | Tampa Bay Mutiny | 2–3 | Dallas Burn | Tampa, Florida |
| | Ralston 8'; Barclay 89' | Report | Pareja 25'; Graziani 67'; Rodríguez 97' | Stadium: Raymond James Stadium; Attendance: 4,286 |

| September 1, 2001 | D.C. United | 5–1 | Tampa Bay Mutiny | Washington, D.C. |
| | Conteh 27', 49'; Moreno 39'; Lisi 47'; Alegria 71' | Report | Jair 61' | Stadium: RFK Stadium; Attendance: 54,282 |

| September 9, 2001 | Tampa Bay Mutiny | 1–2 | Columbus Crew | Tampa, Florida |
| | Barclay 23' | Report | Maisonneuve 29'; Cunningham 40' | Stadium: Raymond James Stadium; Attendance: 9,932 |

== U.S. Open Cup ==
The Mutiny entered the 2001 U.S. Open Cup in the Second Round. In their first game, the Mutiny lost to the Connecticut Wolves of the second division A-League.

| June 26, 2001 Second Round | Connecticut Wolves | 3–2 | (Florida) Tampa Bay Mutiny | New Britain, Connecticut |
| | Oparaku 50'; Griffiths 58'; Knights 86' | Report | Barclay 55'; Diallo 89' | Stadium: Veterans Stadium; Attendance: 4,362; Referee: Erich Simmons |
