= Tracey Winzen =

American soccer player (born 1981)

Personal information
- Full name: Tracey Lynn Winzen
- Date of birth: April 15, 1981 (age 45)
- Place of birth: Orange, California, United States
- Height: 1.67 m (5 ft 6 in)
- Position: Midfielder

College career
Years	Team	Apps	(Gls)
1999–2002	UCLA Bruins		

Senior career*
Years	Team	Apps	(Gls)
2004	VfL Wolfsburg	19	(2)
- * Club domestic league appearances and goals

Tracey Lynn Winzen (born April 15, 1981) is an American football player who played as a midfielder for VfL Wolfsburg.

== Personal life ==
Winzen is married to male soccer player Clint Mathis.
