= 2000 Tampa Bay Mutiny season =

Tampa Bay Mutiny
2000 season
- Head coach: Tim Hankinson
- Stadium: Raymond James Stadium; Tampa, Florida
- MLS: Conference: 2nd Overall: 4th
- MLS Cup Playoffs: Quarterfinals
- U.S. Open Cup: Third round
- Top goalscorer: Mamadou Diallo (26)
- Average home league attendance: 9,452

The 2000 Tampa Bay Mutiny season was the fifth season for the Tampa Bay Mutiny both as a club and in Major League Soccer (MLS). The club reached the playoffs after finishing second in the Eastern conference. The club was eliminated in the quarterfinals of the 2000 MLS Cup playoffs. Additionally, they reached the third round of the U.S. Open Cup.
