= Gus Kartes =

American soccer player

Personal information
- Full name: Gus Kartes
- Date of birth: October 19, 1981 (age 45)
- Place of birth: Tarpon Springs, Florida, United States
- Height: 6 ft 0 in (1.83 m)
- Position: Striker

Youth career
- 1996–1997: Olympiacos

Senior career*
Years	Team	Apps	(Gls)
1997–2000	Olympiacos	3	(0)
2001	Colorado Rapids	0	(0)
2001	Tampa Bay Mutiny	18	(0)
2001–2003	Kalamata	2	(0)
2004–2006	Chicago Storm (indoor)	28	(17)

International career
1997	United States U17	1	(0)
- * Club domestic league appearances and goals

Gus Kartes (born October 19, 1981), also known by his Greek name Kostas Karterouliotis, is an American retired soccer player who played as a striker.

Kartes initially became notable in 1996 when, at the age of 15, he signed a five-year, $2 million contract with Greek club Olympiacos, becoming the youngest player to ever sign a first-division contract in Greece. Kartes did not fulfill Olympiakos's hopes, however, garnering little first team playing time, and eventually bought out his contract with a year remaining in order to return to America and play in Major League Soccer. Upon returning to the United States, the Colorado Rapids acquired Kartes in a lottery, but traded him to his hometown Tampa Bay Mutiny in exchange for draft picks. Kartes played the 2001 season for the Mutiny, but was largely unimpressive, registering no points in 516 minutes. After the Mutiny were contracted at the end of the 2001 season, Kartes went undrafted in the allocation and dispersal drafts.

Following this, Kartes returned to Greece to play for Kalamata of the Greek second division. He returned to the United States in 2004 to sign with the Chicago Storm of the Major Indoor Soccer League. The Storm was coached by fellow Greek-American Frank Klopas.
