= Clint Mathis =

American soccer player (born 1976)

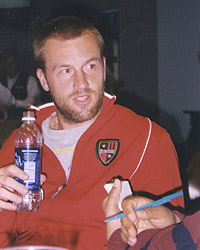
- Mathis with the MetroStars in 2003

Personal information
- Date of birth: November 25, 1976 (age 49)
- Place of birth: Conyers, Georgia, U.S.
- Height: 5 ft 10 in (1.78 m)
- Positions: Forward; midfielder

Youth career
- –1994: AFC Lightning

College career
| Years | Team | Apps | (Gls) |
| 1994–1997 | South Carolina Gamecocks | | |

Senior career*
| Years | Team | Apps | (Gls) |
| 1998–2000 | Los Angeles Galaxy | 65 | (15) |
| 2000–2003 | MetroStars | 67 | (33) |
| 2004–2005 | Hannover 96 | 17 | (5) |
| 2005 | Real Salt Lake | 27 | (3) |
| 2006 | Colorado Rapids | 25 | (2) |
| 2007 | New York Red Bulls | 26 | (6) |
| 2008 | Ergotelis | 8 | (1) |
| 2008–2009 | Real Salt Lake | 39 | (2) |
| 2010 | Los Angeles Galaxy | 9 | (0) |
| Total | | 283 | (67) |

International career
| 1998–2005 | United States | 46 | (12) |

Managerial career
- 2014–2015: Chicago Fire (assistant)
Medal record
Representing United States
Men's soccer
CONCACAF Gold Cup
| Winner | 2002 United States |
| Third place | 2003 Mexico–United States |
- * Club domestic league appearances and goals

Clint Mathis (born November 25, 1976) is an American former professional soccer player who played as a forward or midfielder. He appeared at the 2002 FIFA World Cup, scoring one goal. He also played in Major League Soccer for the MetroStars, where he scored five goals during a game in August 2000, a league record.

== Youth and college ==
Mathis was born in Conyers, Georgia and played club soccer at a young age for Rockdale Youth Soccer Association, and then for AFC Lightning, a Georgia powerhouse producing players such as former U.S. international Ricardo Clark, in Fayetteville. He played school soccer for Heritage High School and won a state championship there.

At the college level, Mathis played for the South Carolina Gamecocks, alongside future US national teammate Josh Wolff. Mathis ranks third all-time in total points (121), third in career coals (53) and is the single-season leader in points (53) and goals (25). Mathis was a consensus first-team All-American in 1995 and a third-team selection in 1997, while he was a three-time finalist for the prestigious Hermann Trophy. Mathis, one of two South Carolina athletes to ever be featured on the cover of Sports Illustrated, helped lead the Gamecocks to the NCAA Tournament in 1994, 1995, and 1997.

== Club career ==
Mathis was drafted sixth overall by Los Angeles Galaxy in the first round of the 1998 MLS College Draft. After two and a half years with Los Angeles, Mathis was awarded to the MetroStars in the dispersal draft after the Galaxy signed Mexican forward Luis Hernández.

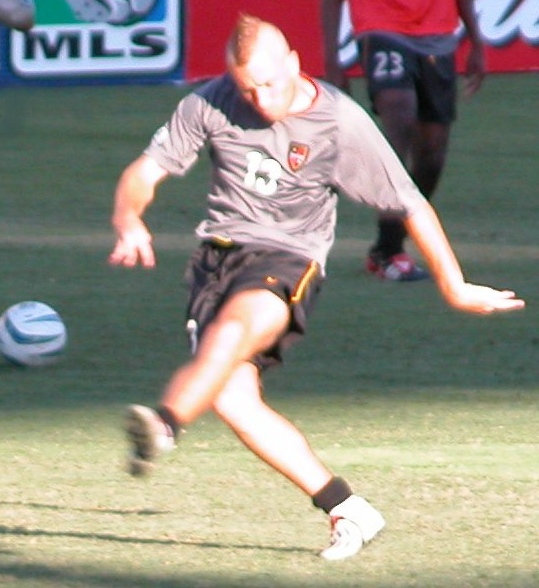
Mathis with the MetroStars

Mathis immediately took his game to a new level, flashing an "I ♥ NY" shirt after scoring goals and breaking the MLS record by scoring five goals in a game against Dallas Burn on August 26, 2000. He finished second in the league in scoring with 16 goals and 14 assists and was named to the MLS Best XI. 2001 saw Mathis score seven goals in his first six games, including the league's eventual Goal of the Year on a half-field run against Dallas. In June, he tore his ACL, which ended his season. He never recovered his pre-injury form and scored only 13 goals in his remaining two seasons with the MetroStars.

After the 2002 MLS season, elite German club Bayern Munich attempted to acquire Mathis but was blocked by MLS. On January 22, 2004, Mathis left the MetroStars to sign on a free transfer with Hannover 96 of the German Bundesliga. Mathis left the Metros after playing in 67 games (66 starts), scoring 33 goals and contributing 21 assists.

Mathis played well in his first season in Germany, scoring on his debut and went on to score four goals in his first five games. But soon after, his manager was fired and replaced by Ewald Lienen. In his second Bundesliga season, Lienen often kept Mathis on the bench. On September 25, 2004, upon entering Hannover's match against Schalke as a very late substitute, Mathis scored the game-winning goal almost immediately. In celebration, he ran to the sideline and tapped his watch at Lienen. Mathis escaped being fined for the outburst and later confirmed the gesture was meant the way it was widely interpreted - that Lienen should have played him earlier. He started the next game but afterwards never played with the first team again. In December, he was transferred back to MLS, joining expansion club Real Salt Lake.

Mathis said he returned to fulfill a promise made to RSL head coach John Ellinger. His initial season in Utah was a major disappointment, as Mathis only managed to score three goals the entire year. However, when he did score he did so in style: all three goals earned praise as MLS Goal of the Week. In December 2005, he was traded to Colorado in exchange for Jeff Cunningham.

On March 29, 2007, Mathis was traded from Colorado Rapids to New York Red Bulls for a 2008 MLS SuperDraft fourth-round draft pick and a conditional draft pick in 2009. In his first home game, he notched a goal and an assist to lead New York to a 3–0 rout of FC Dallas. As of November 2014, Mathis is New York's third all-time goal scorer with 45 in all competitions.

Mathis was traded to Los Angeles Galaxy on November 19, 2007, for a third round pick in the 2008 MLS SuperDraft. He made his debut for the Galaxy in a friendly at Telstra Stadium against Sydney FC in front of 80,000 fans. He scored the first goal in the Galaxy's match versus Wellington Phoenix.

In January 2008, during the European transfer window he left the Galaxy, signing with Ergotelis in Greece. Ergotelis sat at the bottom of the table in the Greek First Division. Down 2–1, Mathis came on to make his debut as a second-half substitute and in the 91 minute of stoppage time down a goal, the ball popped to Mathis outside the box and he struck a powerful left footed volley that the keeper could only deflect into the back of the net, earning a crucial point against fellow relegation battlers Apollon Kalamarias.

Real Salt Lake signed Mathis in August 2008 after acquiring his MLS rights from Los Angeles in exchange for a conditional draft pick, which became a third-round selection in the 2011 MLS SuperDraft.

After 11 years in Major League Soccer, Mathis won the MLS Cup with Real Salt Lake in 2009, defeating Los Angeles Galaxy in a 1–1 draw that was decided in overtime by penalties, with Mathis scoring the first penalty kick goal.

Mathis was traded back to Los Angeles on January 14, 2010, in exchange for a swap of first-round picks in the 2010 MLS SuperDraft.

On August 3, 2010, Mathis announced he would retire from professional soccer after the Galaxy's exhibition match against Real Madrid on Saturday August 7, 2010.

== International career ==
Mathis earned his first cap for the United States national team on November 6, 1998, against Australia.

His first goal came on November 15, 2000, in a 4–0 win over Barbados. He was a contributor for the United States national team in the early stages of qualifying for the 2002 FIFA World Cup, scoring the game-winning goal against Honduras and setting up Josh Wolff's game-winning goal against Costa Rica.

At the 2002 FIFA World Cup, Mathis shaved his hair into a mohawk and scored a goal in the United States' 1–1 draw with South Korea.

== Coaching career ==
On January 31, 2014, Mathis was announced as assistant coach of the MLS Chicago Fire and head coach Frank Yallop.

== Personal life ==
In 1999, Mathis played himself in an episode of The Jersey called "Be True to You" where Morgan Hudson (played by Courtnee Draper) uses a magical jersey by jumping into his body.

In 2002, Mathis became the first male soccer player in eight years to appear on the cover of Sports Illustrated in its World Cup preview issue. Mathis was also on the cover of ESPN MLS Extratime in 2002, and Backyard Soccer 2004. Mathis is married to former soccer player Tracey Winzen.

== Career statistics ==
Appearances and goals by national team and year
| National team | Year | Apps | Goals |
|---|---|---|---|
| United States | 1998 | 1 | 0 |
| United States | 1999 | 2 | 0 |
| United States | 2000 | 2 | 1 |
| United States | 2001 | 6 | 2 |
| United States | 2002 | 15 | 7 |
| United States | 2003 | 12 | 1 |
| United States | 2004 | 6 | 0 |
| United States | 2005 | 2 | 1 |
| Total | | 46 | 12 |

Scores and results list the United States' goal tally first, score column indicates score after each Mathis goal.

List of international goals scored by Clint Mathis
| No. | Date | Venue | Opponent | Score | Result | Competition |
|---|---|---|---|---|---|---|
| 1 | November 15, 2000 | Bridgetown, Barbados | Barbados | 1–0 | 4–0 | 2002 FIFA World Cup Qualifying |
| 2 | March 3, 2001 | Pasadena, California, United States | Brazil | 1–1 | 1–2 | Friendly |
| 3 | March 28, 2001 | San Pedro Sula, Honduras | Honduras | 2–0 | 2–1 | 2002 FIFA World Cup Qualifying |
| 4 | March 2, 2002 | Seattle, Washington, United States | Honduras | 1–0 | 4–0 | Friendly |
| 5 | March 2, 2002 | Seattle, Washington, United States | Honduras | 3–0 | 4–0 | Friendly |
| 6 | March 27, 2002 | Rostock, Germany | Germany | 1–0 | 2–4 | Friendly |
| 7 | March 27, 2002 | Rostock, Germany | Germany | 2–4 | 2–4 | Friendly |
| 8 | April 3, 2002 | Denver, Colorado, United States | Mexico | 1–0 | 1–0 | Friendly |
| 9 | May 16, 2002 | East Rutherford, New Jersey, United States | Jamaica | 2–0 | 5–0 | Friendly |
| 10 | June 10, 2002 | Daegu, South Korea | South Korea | 1–0 | 1–1 | 2002 FIFA World Cup |
| 11 | January 18, 2003 | Ft. Lauderdale, Florida, United States | Canada | 2–0 | 4–0 | Friendly |
| 12 | March 9, 2005 | Fullerton, California, United States | Colombia | 3–0 | 3–0 | Friendly |

== Honors ==
Real Salt Lake

- MLS Cup: 2009

United States

- CONCACAF Gold Cup: 2002

Individual

- MLS 50/50 Club
- MLS All-Star: 2000
- MLS Best XI: 2000
- MLS Goal of the Year Award: 2001
- Georgia Sports Hall of Fame Inductee
- University of South Carolina Athletic Hall of Fame Inductee
- South Carolina Gamecocks Jersey Retired
