= 1997 Tampa Bay Mutiny season =

Tampa Bay Mutiny
1997 season
- Head coach: John Kowalski
- Stadium: Tampa Stadium; Tampa, Florida
- MLS: Conference: 2nd Overall: 4th
- MLS Cup Playoffs: Quarterfinals
- U.S. Open Cup: Quarterfinals
- Top goalscorer: Roy Lassiter (10)
- Average home league attendance: 11,333

The 1997 Tampa Bay Mutiny season was the second season for the Tampa Bay Mutiny both as a club and in Major League Soccer (MLS). The club reached the playoffs after finishing second in the Eastern conference. They reached the quarterfinals of both the playoffs and the U.S. Open Cup.
