= Paul Schneider (soccer) =

American soccer player

Personal information
- Date of birth: June 24, 1976 (age 50)
- Place of birth: Long Island, New York, U.S.
- Height: 5 ft 10 in (1.78 m)
- Position: Forward

Youth career
- 1996: Long Island Rough Riders U-23

College career
Years	Team	Apps	(Gls)
1994–1995	Long Island University		
1996–1997	George Mason Patriots		

Senior career*
Years	Team	Apps	(Gls)
1998–1999	ASV Durlach		
1999	New York Hota		
1999–2000	Minnesota Thunder	42	(12)
2001	Tampa Bay Mutiny	1	(0)
2001	Minnesota Thunder	4	(0)
2001	Atlanta Silverbacks	11	(0)
- * Club domestic league appearances and goals

Paul Schneider (born June 24, 1976) is an American retired soccer player who played professionally in the USL A-League.

Schneider began his college career at Long Island University before transferring to George Mason University in 1996. That summer, he also played for the Long Island Rough Riders U-23 team. Schneider played for ASV Durlach during the 1998–1999 season. He then returned to the United States, briefly played for New York Hota of the Cosmopolitan Soccer League before signing with the Minnesota Thunder of the USISL A-League. In 2001, Schneider played the Major League Soccer pre-season with the Tampa Bay Mutiny. He saw time in only one regular season game before being released. Schneider returned to the Thunder. In June 2001, the Thunder traded Schneider to the Atlanta Silverbacks.
