= 1998 Tampa Bay Mutiny season =

Tampa Bay Mutiny
1998 season
- Head coach: John Kowalski
- Stadium: Tampa Stadium; Tampa, Florida
- MLS: Conference: 2nd Overall: 4th
- MLS Cup Playoffs: Quarterfinals
- U.S. Open Cup: Third round
- Top goalscorer: Mauricio Ramos (9)
- Average home league attendance: 10,312

The 1998 Tampa Bay Mutiny season was the third season for the Tampa Bay Mutiny both as a club and in Major League Soccer (MLS). The club failed to reach the playoffs after finishing fifth in the Eastern conference. Additionally, they reached the quarterfinals of the U.S. Open Cup.
