= 1999 Tampa Bay Mutiny season =

Tampa Bay Mutiny
1999 season
- Head coach: Tim Hankinson
- Stadium: Raymond James Stadium; Tampa, Florida
- MLS: Conference: 2nd Overall: 4th
- MLS Cup Playoffs: Quarterfinals
- U.S. Open Cup: Third round
- Top goalscorer: Musa Shannon (12)
- Average home league attendance: 13,106

The 1999 Tampa Bay Mutiny season was the fourth season for the Tampa Bay Mutiny both as a club and in Major League Soccer (MLS). The club reached the playoffs after finishing third in the Eastern conference. The club was eliminated in the quarterfinals of the 1999 MLS Cup playoffs. Additionally, they reached the quarterfinals of the U.S. Open Cup.
