= MLS Golden Boot =

American soccer award

The MLS Golden Boot (currently commercially termed "MLS Golden Boot presented by Audi") has been awarded since the 2005 season to Major League Soccer's regular–season leading scorer. The award replaced the MLS Scoring Champion Award that was awarded since the league's inception in 1996.

== 1996–2004 ==
Prior to 2005 MLS used a point system that awarded two points for a goal and one point for an assist to give the MLS Scoring Champion Award.

MLS Scoring Champion
Season	Player	Club	Goals (2 points)	Assists (1 point)	Points
1996	(United States) Roy Lassiter	Tampa Bay Mutiny	27	4	58
1997	(United States) Preki	Kansas City Wizards	12	17	41
1998	(Trinidad and Tobago) Stern John	Columbus Crew	26	5	57
1999	(United States) Jason Kreis	Dallas Burn	18	15	51
2000	(Senegal) Mamadou Diallo	Tampa Bay Mutiny	26	4	56
2001	(Honduras) Álex Pineda Chacón	Miami Fusion	19	9	47
2002	(United States) Taylor Twellman	New England Revolution	23	6	52
2003	(United States) Preki (2)	Kansas City Wizards	12	17	41
2004	(Honduras) Amado Guevara	MetroStars	10	10	30
2004	(United States) Pat Noonan	New England Revolution	11	8	30

== 2005–present ==
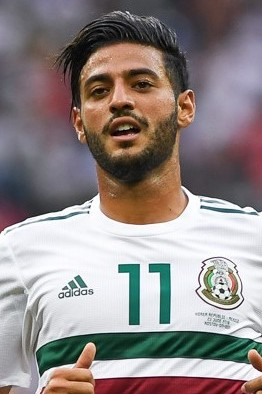
Carlos Vela scored a record 34 goals for Los Angeles FC during the 2019 season.

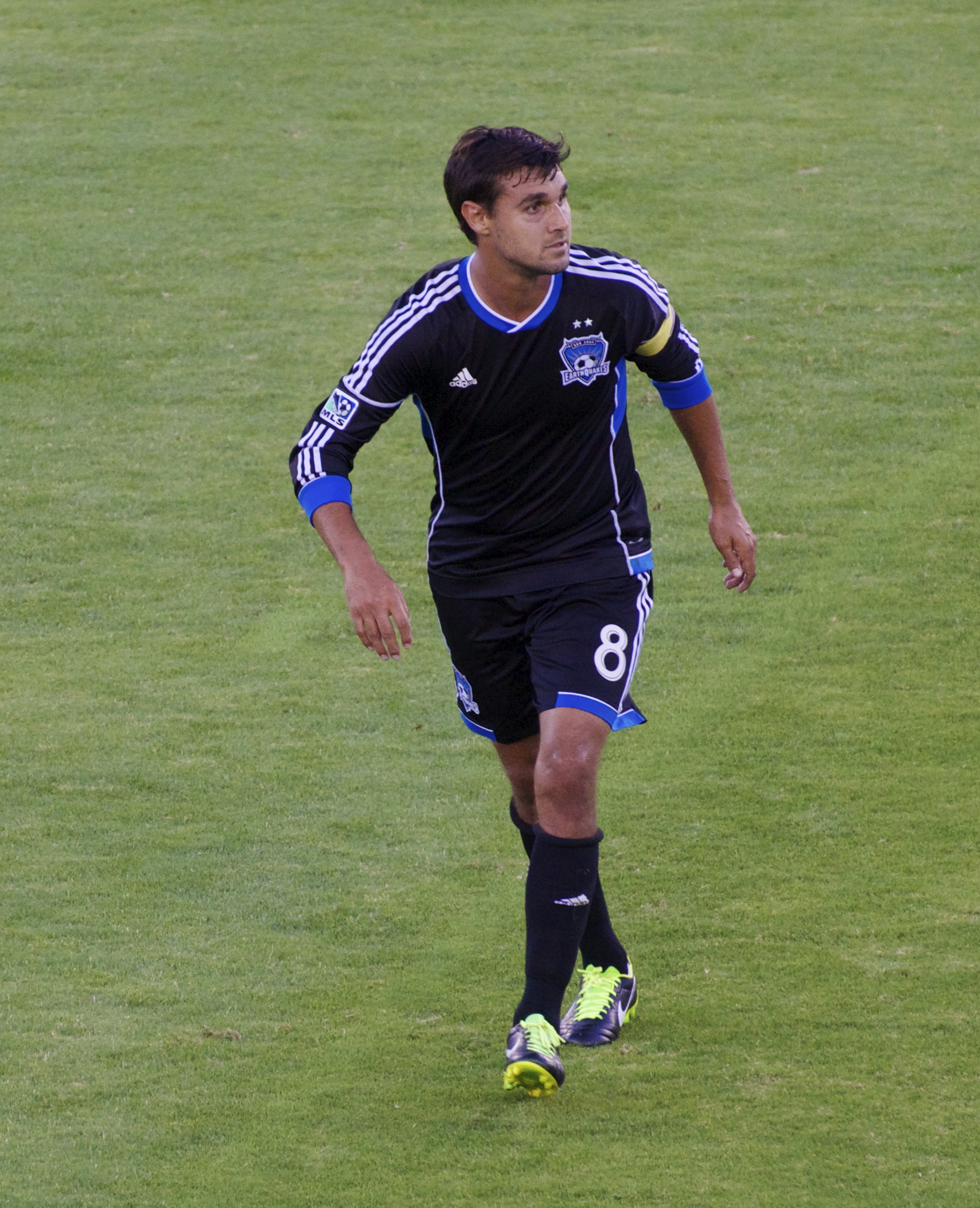
Chris Wondolowski is a two-time winner of the Golden Boot award and the all-time top scorer in MLS history.

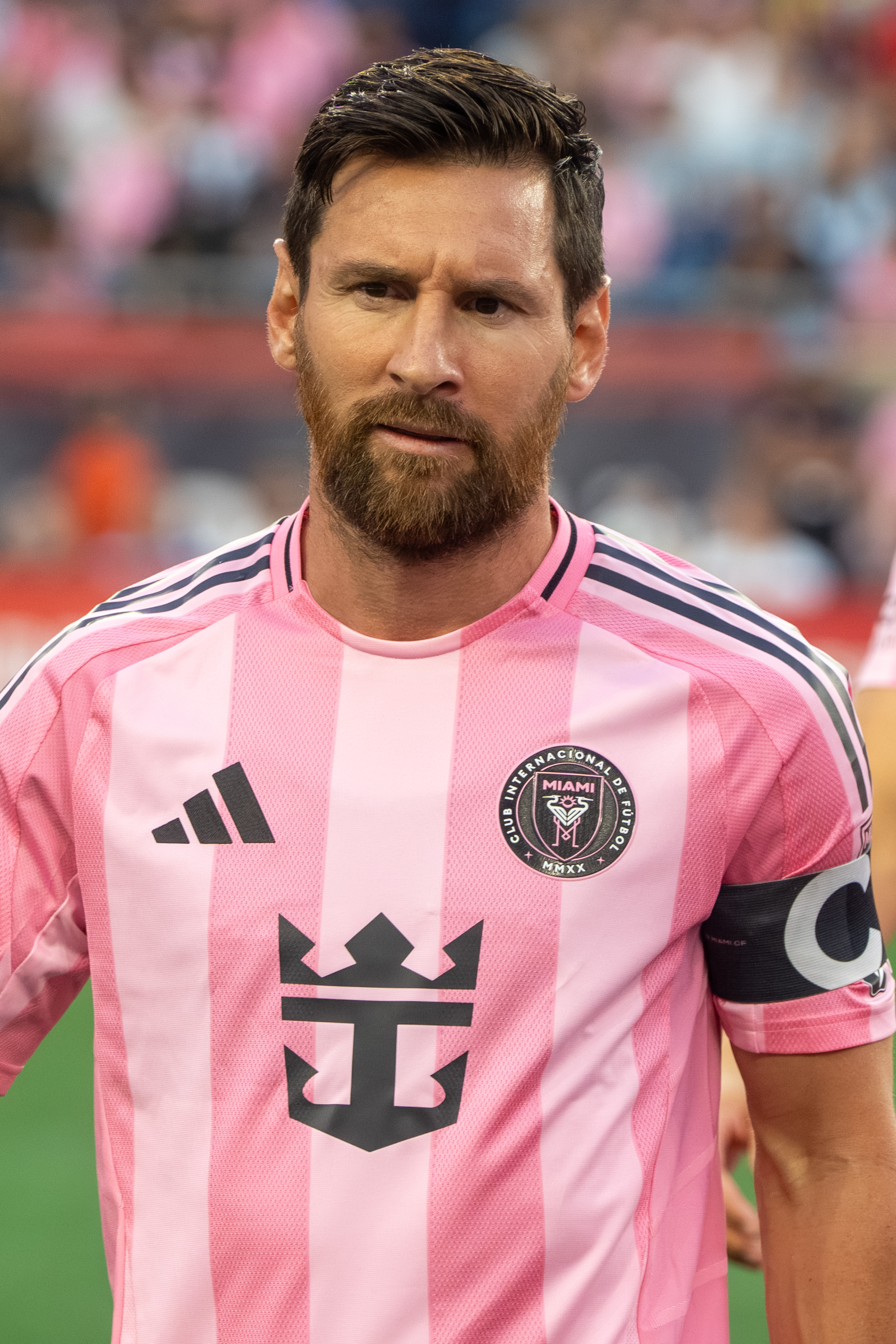
Lionel Messi with Inter Miami CF, became the first MLS Golden Boot winner in consecutive seasons.

Since 2005 Major League Soccer has awarded the MLS Golden Boot to the player who has scored the most goals outright, with ties being broken by assists.

MLS Golden Boot
Season	Player	Club	Goals	Games	Rate
2005	(United States) Taylor Twellman (2)	New England Revolution	17	25	0.68
2006	(United States) Jeff Cunningham	Real Salt Lake	16	31	0.52
2007	(Brazil) Luciano Emilio	D.C. United	20	29	0.69
2008	(United States) Landon Donovan	Los Angeles Galaxy	20	25	0.80
2009	(United States) Jeff Cunningham (2)	FC Dallas	17	28	0.61
2010	(United States) Chris Wondolowski	San Jose Earthquakes	18	28	0.64
2011	(Canada) Dwayne De Rosario	D.C. United	16	33	0.48
2012	(United States) Chris Wondolowski (2)	San Jose Earthquakes	27	32	0.84
2013	(Brazil) Camilo Sanvezzo	Vancouver Whitecaps FC	22	32	0.69
2014	(England) Bradley Wright-Phillips	New York Red Bulls	27	32	0.84
2015	(Italy) Sebastian Giovinco	Toronto FC	22	33	0.67
2016	(England) Bradley Wright-Phillips (2)	New York Red Bulls	24	34	0.71
2017	(Hungary) Nemanja Nikolić	Chicago Fire	24	33	0.73
2018	(Venezuela) Josef Martínez	Atlanta United FC	31	34	0.91
2019	(Mexico) Carlos Vela	Los Angeles FC	34	31	1.10
2020	(Uruguay) Diego Rossi	Los Angeles FC	14	19	0.74
2021	(Argentina) Taty Castellanos	New York City FC	19	32	0.59
2022	(Germany) Hany Mukhtar	Nashville SC	23	33	0.70
2023	(Gabon) Denis Bouanga	Los Angeles FC	20	31	0.65
2024	(Belgium) Christian Benteke	D.C. United	23	30	0.77
2025	(Argentina) Lionel Messi	Inter Miami CF	29	28	1.04
2026	(Argentina) Lionel Messi (2)	Inter Miami CF	26	31	0.84
