= Alex Comas =

Colombian footballer (born 1971)

Personal information
- Full name: Alex Javier Comas Yacomelo
- Date of birth: 14 November 1971 (age 54)
- Place of birth: Barranquilla, Colombia
- Height: 1.85 m (6 ft 1 in)
- Position: Forward

Senior career*
| Years | Team | Apps | (Gls) |
| 1991 | Independiente Medellín | | |
| 1992 | Atlético Junior | | |
| 1993 | Unión Magdalena | | |
| 1994 | Deportes Quindío | 45 | (24) |
| 1995 | América de Cali | | |
| 1995–1996 | San Lorenzo | 4 | (0) |
| 1997–1999 | Atlético Nacional | | |
| 1999 | Atlético Junior | 26 | (7) |
| 2000–2001 | MetroStars | 37 | (15) |
| 2002 | Atlético Junior | | |
| 2002–2003 | Carabobo | | |
| 2003 | Deportes Tolima | 21 | (3) |
| 2004–2005 | Deportes La Serena | | |
| 2006 | Real Cartagena | 7 | (0) |
| 2006 | Santiago Morning | 11 | (4) |
| 2007 | Unión Magdalena | | |
| 2007–2008 | Aragua | 3 | (0) |

International career
| 1998 | Colombia | 2 | (1) |
- * Club domestic league appearances and goals

Alex Javier Comas Yacomelo (born 14 November 1971) is a Colombian former professional association football player. Throughout his career he has played in five countries and has even featured for the Colombia national team.

== Biography ==
=== Playing career ===
In preparation of the 2000 Major League Soccer season, then-MetroStars manager, Octavio Zambrano, was looking for a strike partner for Adolfo Valencia. After viewing a videotape of Comas, Zambrano invited the Colombian to join the MetroStars for training camp where he impressed enough to earn a contract. Comas quickly formed a partnership with Valencia in the MetroStars attack and the two opened the season by each scoring a goal against rival club, D.C. United in front of 27,322 fans at Giants Stadium.

==== International career ====
Comas has made a few appearances for the Colombia national team. One of those appearances was against Paraguay in a friendly before the 1998 FIFA World Cup, though Comas was not named to the roster for the World Cup in France.

== Career statistics ==
| Club performance | | | League | | Cup | | League Cup | | Continental | | Total | |
| Season | Club | League | Apps | Goals | Apps | Goals | Apps | Goals | Apps | Goals | Apps | Goals |
| USA | | | League | | Open Cup | | League Cup | | North America | | Total | |
|---|---|---|---|---|---|---|---|---|---|---|---|---|
| 2000 | MetroStars | MLS | 25 | 13 | | | | | | | | |
| 2001 | MetroStars | MLS | 12 | 2 | | | | | | | | |
| Total | Country | | 37 | 15 | - | - | - | - | - | - | - | - |
| Career total | | | - | - | | | | | | | | |
