= 2000 Major League Soccer season =

5th season of Major League Soccer

Major League Soccer
- Season: 2000
- Teams: 12
- MLS Cup: Kansas City Wizards (1st title)
- Supporters' Shield: Kansas City Wizards (1st shield)
- CONCACAF Champions' Cup: Kansas City Wizards; Chicago Fire
- Matches: 192
- Goals: 612 (3.19 per match)
- Top goalscorer: Mamadou Diallo; Tampa Bay Mutiny; Goals: 26
- Longest winning run: MetroStars; Games: 5 (1 Jul – 2 Aug)
- Longest unbeaten run: Kansas City Wizards; Games: 12 (25 Mar – 4 Jun)
- Longest losing run: San Jose Earthquakes; Games: 6 (15 Jul – 19 Aug)
- Highest attendance: Los Angeles Galaxy; Season: 326,392; Game Avg.: 20,400
- Lowest attendance: Miami Fusion; Season: 119,352; Game Avg.: 7,460
- Total attendance: 2,641,085
- Average attendance: 13,756

Locations of teams for the 2000 Major League Soccer season
Western Division Central Division Eastern Division

The 2000 Major League Soccer season was the fifth season of Major League Soccer. It was also the 88th season of FIFA-sanctioned soccer in the United States, and the 22nd with a national first-division league.

The 2000 season marked the first time in league history (and the first season of American first division soccer since 1974), that ties were allowed to stand. Following a ten-minute sudden death extra time, rather than going to a penalty shoot-out, a point was awarded to both teams. Additionally, the league was divided into three separate divisions, the East, Central and West divisions.

The San Jose Clash rebranded as the Earthquakes, a throwback to the NASL team of the same name.

The regular season began on March 18, and concluded on September 9. The 2000 MLS Cup Playoffs began on September 14, and concluded with MLS Cup 2000 on October 15. The Kansas City Wizards won their first MLS Cup with a victory over the Chicago Fire.

== Overview ==
=== Season format ===
The season began on March 18 and concluded with MLS Cup on October 15. The 12 teams were split into three divisions. Each team played 32 games that were evenly divided between home and away. Each team played every other team in their division four times, for a total of 12 games. The remaining schedule consisted of three games against four select opponents in one of the other divisions, and two games against the remaining four teams.

The eight teams with the most points qualified for the MLS Cup Playoffs. The quarterfinals and semifinals were played as a best-of-three series, and the winners advanced to MLS Cup. In all rounds, draws were broken by penalty shootout if necessary. The away goals rule was not used in any round.

The team with the most points in the regular season was awarded the MLS Supporters' Shield. The winner of MLS Cup, and the runner-up, qualified for the CONCACAF Champions' Cup.

=== Stadiums and locations ===
Team	Stadium	Capacity
Chicago Fire	Soldier Field	66,944
Colorado Rapids	Mile High Stadium	76,273
Columbus Crew	Columbus Crew Stadium	22,555
D.C. United	RFK Stadium	46,000
Dallas Burn	Cotton Bowl	92,100
Kansas City Wizards	Arrowhead Stadium	81,425
Los Angeles Galaxy	Rose Bowl	92,542
Miami Fusion	Lockhart Stadium	20,450
New England Revolution	Foxboro Stadium	60,292
MetroStars	Giants Stadium	80,200
San Jose Earthquakes	Spartan Stadium	30,456
Tampa Bay Mutiny	Raymond James Stadium	69,218

=== Personnel and sponsorships ===
Team	Head coach	Captain	Shirt sponsor
Chicago Fire	(United States) Bob Bradley		—
Colorado Rapids	(United States) Glenn Myernick		
Columbus Crew	(United States) Tom Fitzgerald		Snickers
D.C. United	(Netherlands) Thomas Rongen		MasterCard
Dallas Burn	(United States) Dave Dir		
Kansas City Wizards	(United States) Bob Gansler		—
Los Angeles Galaxy	(United States) Sigi Schmid		—
MetroStars	(Ecuador) Octavio Zambrano	(United States) Tab Ramos	New York Life
Miami Fusion	(England) Ray Hudson		—
New England Revolution	(United States) Fernando Clavijo		—
San Jose Earthquakes	(Germany) Lothar Osiander	(United States) John Doyle	Yahoo! Sports
Tampa Bay Mutiny	(United States) Tim Hankinson		

=== Coaching changes ===
Team	Outgoing coach	Manner of departure	Date of vacancy	Incoming coach	Date of appointment
Miami Fusion	(Brazil) Ivo Wortmann	Fired	May 8, 2000	(England) Ray Hudson	May 8, 2000

== Standings ==
=== Eastern Division ===
Pos	Team	Pld	W	L	T	GF	GA	GD	Pts	Qualification
1	MetroStars	32	17	12	3	64	56	+8	54	MLS Cup Playoffs
2	New England Revolution	32	13	13	6	47	49	−2	45	MLS Cup Playoffs
3	Miami Fusion	32	12	15	5	54	56	−2	41	
4	D.C. United	32	8	18	6	44	63	−19	30	

Source: MLS

=== Central Division ===
Pos	Team	Pld	W	L	T	GF	GA	GD	Pts	Qualification
1	Chicago Fire	32	17	9	6	67	51	+16	57	MLS Cup Playoffs
2	Tampa Bay Mutiny	32	16	12	4	62	50	+12	52	MLS Cup Playoffs
3	Dallas Burn	32	14	14	4	54	54	0	46	MLS Cup Playoffs
4	Columbus Crew	32	11	16	5	48	58	−10	38	

Source: MLS

=== Western Division ===
Pos	Team	Pld	W	L	T	GF	GA	GD	Pts	Qualification
1	Kansas City Wizards	32	16	7	9	47	29	+18	57	MLS Cup Playoffs
2	Los Angeles Galaxy	32	14	10	8	47	37	+10	50	MLS Cup Playoffs
3	Colorado Rapids	32	13	15	4	43	59	−16	43	MLS Cup Playoffs
4	San Jose Earthquakes	32	7	17	8	35	50	−15	29	

Source: MLS

=== Overall standings ===
Pos	Team	Pld	W	L	T	GF	GA	GD	Pts	Qualification
1	Kansas City Wizards (C, S)	32	16	7	9	47	29	+18	57	CONCACAF Champions' Cup
2	Chicago Fire	32	17	9	6	67	51	+16	57	CONCACAF Champions' Cup
3	MetroStars	32	17	12	3	64	56	+8	54	
4	Tampa Bay Mutiny	32	16	12	4	62	50	+12	52	
5	Los Angeles Galaxy	32	14	10	8	47	37	+10	50	
6	Dallas Burn	32	14	14	4	54	54	0	46	
7	New England Revolution	32	13	13	6	47	49	−2	45	
8	Colorado Rapids	32	13	15	4	43	59	−16	43	
9	Miami Fusion	32	12	15	5	54	56	−2	41	
10	Columbus Crew	32	11	16	5	48	58	−10	38	
11	D.C. United	32	8	18	6	44	63	−19	30	
12	San Jose Earthquakes	32	7	17	8	35	50	−15	29	

Source: MLS
Rules for classification: 1) points; 2) head-to-head record; 3) goal difference; 4) number of goals scored
(C) Champion; (S) Supporters' Shield

== Fixtures and results ==
Home \ Away	CHI	COL	CLB	DAL	DC	KC	LA	MIA	NE	MTS	SJ	TB
Chicago Fire	—	1–2	3–1	4–3	3–2	3–2	2–1	1–0	0–1	3–1	4–1	5–1
Chicago Fire	—	2–1	3–1	4–0	—	—	—	2–1	—	—	—	0–0*
Colorado Rapids	2–1*	—	0–0*	1–0	2–5	0–5	1–0*	1–2	2–1	1–3	0–1	1–0
Colorado Rapids	1–1*	—	—	—	—	1–1*	1–0*	3–1	—	—	2–0	—
Columbus Crew	0–2	2–3	—	2–1	1–1*	2–0	2–2*	2–0	3–1	0–2	2–1*	1–2
Columbus Crew	2–3	—	—	1–1*	—	—	—	—	4–1	—	2–1	3–4
Dallas Burn	4–2	0–1	2–1	—	3–0	4–1	1–1*	1–1*	2–1	4–6	2–1	1–0
Dallas Burn	3–0	—	3–2	—	1–0	—	4–2	—	—	—	—	2–3
D.C. United	3–2	1–1*	1–2	3–2	—	0–0*	0–4	2–1*	1–3	2–3*	0–1	2–2*
D.C. United	—	—	—	2–0	—	—	1–2	2–6	2–0	3–2*	—	—
Kansas City Wizards	4–3	3–0	3–1	0–0*	2–0	—	2–0	1–2	0–1	2–0	2–0	1–0
Kansas City Wizards	—	3–1	—	—	—	—	1–5	—	—	0–1	2–0	1–0
Los Angeles Galaxy	1–1*	2–1	1–0	2–1	2–1	0–0*	—	2–0	2–2*	0–2	1–1*	2–1
Los Angeles Galaxy	—	1–0*	—	0–1	1–2	1–1*	—	—	—	—	2–1	—
Miami Fusion	0–3	2–0	2–4	0–3	1–0*	0–0*	3–5	—	1–1*	3–1	0–0*	2–3
Miami Fusion	4–2	4–1	—	—	3–1	—	—	—	2–1	4–1	—	—
New England Revolution	1–1*	3–4	1–1*	1–2	2–1*	0–1	2–1	1–1*	—	0–2	2–1	2–1
New England Revolution	—	—	2–1	—	1–0	—	—	2–0	—	4–3	3–0	—
MetroStars	4–1	5–3	0–1	2–1	3–2	1–2	0–1	4–2	4–2	—	0–0*	3–2*
MetroStars	—	—	—	—	2–2*	0–0*	—	2–1	2–1*	—	—	0–3
San Jose Earthquakes	1–1*	4–2	1–2	5–0	2–2*	0–0*	0–0*	3–1	2–2*	2–0	—	1–2
San Jose Earthquakes	—	1–2	3–0	—	—	0–3	0–3	—	1–2	—	—	—
Tampa Bay Mutiny	0–1	4–2	5–1	3–1	3–0	1–2	2–0	1–4	1–0	0–2	4–0	—
Tampa Bay Mutiny	3–3*	—	3–1	2–1	—	2–2*	—	—	—	4–3*	—	—

Source: FBREF.com
Legend: Blue = home team win; Yellow = draw; Red = away team win.

Note: * = Match required extra time

== MLS Cup playoffs ==
=== Bracket ===
Quarterfinals
1	Kansas City Wizards (7 Points)	1	0	3
8	Colorado Rapids (1 Points)	0	0	2
4	Tampa Bay Mutiny (0 Points)	0	2	x
5	Los Angeles Galaxy (6 Points)	1	5	x
2	Chicago Fire (6 Points)	2	1	6
7	New England Revolution (3 Points)	1	2	0
3	MetroStars (ASDET*) (6 Points)	2*	2	x
6	Dallas Burn (0 Points)	1	1	x

Semifinals
1	Kansas City Wizards (SDET**) (4 Points)	0	1	1**
5	Los Angeles Galaxy (ASDET*) (4 Points)	0	2*	0
2	Chicago Fire (6 Points)	3	0	3
3	MetroStars (3 Points)	0	2	2

MLS Cup
1	Kansas City Wizards	1
2	Chicago Fire	0

- Points system
  Win = 3 Pts.
  Loss = 0 Pts.
  Draw = 1 Pt.
- ASDET*=Added sudden death extra time (game tie breaker)
  SDET**=Sudden death extra time (series tie breaker)
  Teams will advance at 5 points.

=== Quarterfinals ===
September 16, 2000
Game 1

Colorado Rapids	0–1	Kansas City Wizards
		Molnar 18'

Arrowhead Stadium
Kansas City, Missouri
Attendance: 8,682
September 20, 2000
Game 2

Kansas City Wizards	0–0	Colorado Rapids

INVESCO Field at Mile High
Denver, Colorado
Attendance: 8,789
September 24, 2000
Game 3

Colorado Rapids	2–3	Kansas City Wizards
Bravo 70', 90+' (pen.)		Henderson 11'; Molnar 65'; Gomez 69'

Arrowhead Stadium
Kansas City, Missouri
Attendance: 4,156

Kansas City Wizards advance 7–1 on points.

September 15, 2000
Game 1

New England Revolution	1–2	Chicago Fire
Harris 50'		Wright 54' (o.g.); Kovalenko 73'

Soldier Field
Chicago, Illinois
Attendance: 10,476
September 19, 2000
Game 2

Chicago Fire	1–2	New England Revolution
Kovalenko 83'		Wynalda 18'; Wright 86'

Foxboro Stadium
Foxborough, Massachusetts
Attendance: 10,723
September 22, 2000
Game 3

New England Revolution	0–6	Chicago Fire
		Razov 5', 65'; Stoichkov 14', 17'; Nowak 45'+ George 75'

Soldier Field
Chicago, Illinois
Attendance: 5,972

Chicago Fire advance 6–3 on points.

September 15, 2000
Game 1

Dallas Burn	1–1 (AET) 0–1 (ASDET)	MetroStars
Rhine 57'		Mathis 34'; Valencia 100'

Giants Stadium
East Rutherford, New Jersey
Attendance: 14,868
September 20, 2000
Game 2

MetroStars	2–1	Dallas Burn
Mathis 53', 81'		Rodríguez 82' (pen.)

Cotton Bowl
Dallas, Texas
Attendance: 7,555

MetroStars advance 6–0 on points.

September 14, 2000
Game 1

Los Angeles Galaxy	1–0	Tampa Bay Mutiny
Vanney 61' (pen.)

Raymond James Stadium
Tampa, Florida
Attendance: 5,583
September 20, 2000
Game 2

Tampa Bay Mutiny	2–5	Los Angeles Galaxy
Diallo 21', 67'		Hendrickson 14'; Kelly 19'; Hernández 48'; Cienfuegos 51'; Jones 85'

Rose Bowl
Pasadena, California
Attendance: 13,581

Los Angeles Galaxy advance 6–0 on points.

=== Semifinals ===
September 26, 2000
Game 1

MetroStars	0–3	Chicago Fire
		Stoichkov 21'; Kovalenko 35'; Razov 84'

Soldier Field
Chicago, Illinois
Attendance: 7,141
September 30, 2000
Game 2

Chicago Fire	0–2	MetroStars
		Chung 40'; Valencia 84'

Giants Stadium
East Rutherford, New Jersey
Attendance: 15,476
October 6, 2000
Game 3

MetroStars	2–3	Chicago Fire
Valencia 32', 36'		Brown 4'; Stoichkov 31'; Razov 88'

Soldier Field
Chicago, Illinois
Attendance: 10,133

Chicago Fire advance 6-3 on points.

September 29, 2000
Game 1

Los Angeles Galaxy	0–0	Kansas City Wizards

Arrowhead Stadium
Kansas City, Missouri
Attendance: 11,815
October 3, 2000
Game 2

Kansas City Wizards	1–1 (AET) 0–1 (ASDET)	Los Angeles Galaxy
McKeon 29'		Jones 16'; Califf 93'

Rose Bowl
Pasadena, California
Attendance: 20,849
October 6, 2000
Game 3

Los Angeles Galaxy	0–1	Kansas City Wizards
		Molnar 22' (pen.)

Arrowhead Stadium
Kansas City, Missouri
Attendance: 8,320

0–1 series (SDET)
	Molnar 6'

Kansas City Wizards advance 1–0 in series overtime (SDET) after 4–4 tie on points.

=== MLS Cup ===
October 15, 2000

Kansas City Wizards	1–0	Chicago Fire
Molnar 11'

RFK Stadium
Washington, D.C.
Attendance: 39,159

== Player statistics ==
=== Goals ===
Rank	Player	Club	Goals
1	(Senegal) Mamadou Diallo	Tampa Bay Mutiny	26
2	(United States) Ante Razov	Chicago Fire	18
3	(United States) Clint Mathis	Los Angeles Galaxy; MetroStars	16
3	(Colombia) Diego Serna	Miami Fusion	16
3	(Colombia) Adolfo Valencia	MetroStars	16
6	(Ecuador) Ariel Graziani	Dallas Burn	15
6	(United States) Dante Washington	Columbus Crew	15
6	(Jamaica) Wolde Harris	New England Revolution	15
9	(Colombia) Alex Comas	MetroStars	13
10	(Denmark) Miklos Molnar	Kansas City Wizards	12
10	(Bolivia) Jaime Moreno	D.C. United	12

=== Hat-tricks ===
Player	Club	Against	Result	Date
(United States) Ante Razov	Chicago Fire	Miami Fusion	3–0	May 6
(Bolivia) Jaime Moreno	D.C. United	Colorado Rapids	5–2	May 6
(Colombia) Diego Serna	Miami Fusion	Tampa Bay Mutiny	4–1	June 21
(Senegal) Mamadou Diallo	Tampa Bay Mutiny	MetroStars	4–3	August 16
(United States) Clint Mathis^{5}	MetroStars	Dallas Burn	6–4	August 26
(Senegal) Mamadou Diallo	Tampa Bay Mutiny	Columbus Crew	4–3	August 30
(Colombia) Diego Serna^{4}	Miami Fusion	MetroStars	4–1	September 2
(Colombia) Diego Serna	Miami Fusion	D.C. United	6–2	September 9
(Colombia) Alex Comas	MetroStars	New England Revolution	3–4	September 9

=== Assists ===
Rank	Player	Club	Assists
1	(Colombia) Carlos Valderrama	Tampa Bay Mutiny	26
2	(United States) Clint Mathis	Los Angeles Galaxy, MetroStars	13
3	(United States) Eric Quill	Tampa Bay Mutiny	11
4	(Guatemala) Martín Machón	Miami Fusion	10
4	(United States) Steve Ralston	Tampa Bay Mutiny	10
6	(United States) Preki	Kansas City Wizards	9
6	(Colombia) Diego Serna	Miami Fusion	9
8	(United States) Mark Chung	MetroStars	8
8	(United States) Jason Kreis	Dallas Burn	8
8	(Colombia) Adolfo Valencia	MetroStars	8
8	(Poland) Robert Warzycha	Columbus Crew	8

=== Clean sheets ===
Rank	Player	Club	Clean sheets
1	(United States) Tony Meola	Kansas City Wizards	16
2	(United States) Joe Cannon	San Jose Earthquakes	7
2	(United States) Kevin Hartman	LA Galaxy	7
2	(United States) Matt Jordan	Dallas Burn	7
5	(United States) Scott Garlick	Tampa Bay Mutiny	6
6	(United States) Zach Thornton	Chicago Fire	5
7	(United States) Tim Howard	MetroStars	4
7	(United States) David Kramer	Colorado Rapids	4
9	(United States) Jeff Causey	New England Revolution	3
9	(United States) Mark Dougherty	Columbus Crew	3

== Awards ==
=== Individual awards ===
Award	Player	Club
Most Valuable Player	(United States) Tony Meola	Kansas City Wizards
Defender of the Year	(United States) Peter Vermes	Kansas City Wizards
Goalkeeper of the Year	(United States) Tony Meola	Kansas City Wizards
Coach of the Year	(United States) Bob Gansler	Kansas City Wizards
Rookie of the Year	(United States) Carlos Bocanegra	Chicago Fire
Comeback Player of the Year	(United States) Tony Meola	Kansas City Wizards
Scoring Champion	(Senegal) Mamadou Diallo	Tampa Bay Mutiny
Goal of the Year	(United States) Marcelo Balboa	Colorado Rapids
Fair Play Award	(United States) Steve Ralston	Tampa Bay Mutiny
Humanitarian of the Year	(Sierra Leone) Abdul Thompson Conteh	San Jose Earthquakes

=== Best XI ===
Goalkeeper	Defenders	Midfielders	Forwards
(United States) Tony Meola, Kansas City	(United States) Robin Fraser, LA Galaxy (United States) Greg Vanney, LA Galaxy (United States) Peter Vermes, Kansas City	(United States) Chris Armas, Chicago (Poland) Piotr Nowak, Chicago (United States) Steve Ralston, Tampa Bay (Bulgaria) Hristo Stoichkov, Chicago (Colombia) Carlos Valderrama, Tampa Bay	(Senegal) Mamadou Diallo, Tampa Bay (United States) Clint Mathis, MetroStars

=== Player of the Month ===
Week	Player	Club
April	(Denmark) Miklos Molnar	Kansas City Wizards
May	(United States) Tony Meola	Kansas City Wizards
June	(United States) Clint Mathis	MetroStars
July	(United States) Dante Washington	Columbus Crew
August	(United States) Clint Mathis	MetroStars
September	(Colombia) Diego Serna	Miami Fusion

== Attendance ==
Team	Games	Total	Average
Los Angeles Galaxy	16	326,392	20,400
D.C. United	16	297,279	18,580
MetroStars	16	281,938	17,621
New England Revolution	16	247,409	15,463
Columbus Crew	16	247,220	15,451
Chicago Fire	16	214,189	13,387
Dallas Burn	16	209,637	13,102
Colorado Rapids	16	201,280	12,580
San Jose Earthquakes	16	199,364	12,460
Tampa Bay Mutiny	16	151,232	9,452
Kansas City Wizards	16	145,793	9,112
Miami Fusion	16	119,352	7,460
Totals	192	2,641,085	13,756
