= Mamadou Diallo (footballer, born 1971) =

Senegalese footballer

Personal information
- Full name: Mamadou Diallo Sebane
- Date of birth: 28 August 1971 (age 55)
- Place of birth: Dakar, Senegal
- Height: 1.90 m (6 ft 3 in)
- Position: Forward

Senior career*
Years	Team	Apps	(Gls)
1988–1991	Sotra FC		
1991–1993	Port Autonome	45	(30)
1993–1995	Kawkab Marrakech	60	(31)
1995–1996	→ St. Gallen (loan)	22	(7)
1996–1997	Zeytinburnuspor	30	(14)
1997–1999	Lillestrøm	16	(9)
1999	→ MSV Duisburg (loan)	7	(0)
1999	→ Vålerenga (loan)	8	(5)
2000–2001	Tampa Bay Mutiny	50	(35)
2002	New England Revolution	7	(1)
2002	MetroStars	17	(11)
2002	Al-Ahli		
2003	IFK Göteborg	13	(3)
2004–2005	Pahang	11	(8)
2005–2006	Jomo Cosmos	23	(5)
2006–2007	Djoliba AC		

International career
1990-1999	Senegal	35	(16)
- * Club domestic league appearances and goals

Mamadou Diallo (born 28 August 1971) is a Senegalese former professional footballer who played as a forward. He played in twelve countries across four continents: United States, Senegal, Morocco, Switzerland, Saudi Arabia, Malaysia, South Africa, Mali, Germany, Turkey, Sweden and Norway. A prolific scorer almost everywhere he played, he became a regular for the Senegal national team.

== Club career ==
Diallo was born in Dakar, Senegal.

=== Major League Soccer ===
Major League Soccer signed Diallo in 2000 and allocated him to the Tampa Bay Mutiny. Diallo exploded on the MLS scene in his first season, combining well with midfield general Carlos Valderrama. Diallo scored 26 goals, the best in the league since Roy Lassiter had 27 in 1996; he was named to the MLS Best XI and was the league Scoring Champion.

However, Diallo is also remembered for the incident on 16 August 2000 in a game against the MetroStars, where he collided with and stepped on Metro goalie Mike Ammann, breaking his ribs and puncturing his lung. The referee saw the collision as unintentional contact, and he was neither fined nor carded for the incident. However, there were those (including Ammann himself) that considered the contact was intentional.

In 2001, with Valderrama traded in mid-season, Diallo had a down year, slipping to nine goals. The Mutiny was contracted after the season and Diallo was selected by the New England Revolution in the 2002 MLS Allocation Draft. He only spent seven games in New England, and was sent over to the MetroStars in a six-player deal on 24 May. He had a four-goal game against the Los Angeles Galaxy in only his second match with the team, but his scoring tapered off and the Metros missed the playoffs.

=== Later career ===
Diallo moved to Saudi Arabian club Al-Ahli on 7 October 2002, but was dropped in November after failing to impress. His globetrotting ways took him to the former UEFA Cup winners, the Swedish club IFK Göteborg, then Malaysian club Pahang, then Jomo Cosmos of South Africa and finally with Djoliba AC until he retired.

== International career ==
Diallo won 35 caps for Senegal, scoring 16 goals, in a career which saw him represent his country at the African Cup of Nations in 1994. He played for Senegal at the 2007 Beach Soccer World Cup, scoring one goal and receiving one red card.

== Personal life ==
Diallo's son, Boubacar Diallo, currently plays for FC Tulsa.

== Career statistics ==
=== International ===
Appearances and goals by national team and year
National team	Year	Apps	Goals
Senegal	1990	1	0
Senegal	1992	5	5
Senegal	1993	5	3
Senegal	1994	6	1
Senegal	1995	7	5
Senegal	1996	4	1
Senegal	1997	3	0
Senegal	1999	4	1
Total		35	16

== Honors ==
Individual

- MLS Best XI: 2000
- MLS All-Star: 2000
