= Bouna =

Bouna may refer to:

- Bouna, Ivory Coast, a town in north-east Ivory Coast.
  - Bouna Department
- Bouna (Di), a village in Di Department, Sourou Province, Burkina Faso.
- Bouna (Yé), a village in Yé département, Nayala Province, Burkina Faso.
- Bouna Coundoul, Senegalese footballer
- Bouna was a former name of the Algerian town now called Annaba.
