= 2012 Major League Soccer season =

17th season of Major League Soccer

Major League Soccer
- Season: 2012
- Teams: 19
- MLS Cup: LA Galaxy (4th title)
- Supporters' Shield: San Jose Earthquakes (2nd shield)
- Champions League (U.S.): San Jose Earthquakes; LA Galaxy; Houston Dynamo; Sporting Kansas City (via U.S. Open Cup)
- Champions League (Canada): Toronto FC (via Canadian Championship)
- Matches: 323
- Goals: 854 (2.64 per match)
- Top goalscorer: Chris Wondolowski (27 goals)
- Biggest home win: SJ 5–0 RSL (July 14); DAL 5–0 POR (July 21)
- Biggest away win: CHV 0–4 LA (August 12); CHV 2–6 SEA (August 25); CHV 0-4 RSL (September 29)
- Highest scoring: 8 goals: SJ 5–3 DC (May 2); POR 3–5 LA (July 14); CHV 2–6 SEA (August 25)
- Longest winning run: 7 matches: Sporting KC (March 10 – April 18)
- Longest unbeaten run: 11 matches: Sporting KC (August 4 – October 24)
- Longest winless run: 14 matches: Toronto FC (July 28 – October 28)
- Longest losing run: 9 matches: Toronto FC (March 17 – May 19)
- Highest attendance: 66,452; POR @ SEA (October 7)
- Lowest attendance: 6,149; COL @ NE (May 2)
- Average attendance: 18,807

Locations of teams for the 2012 Major League Soccer season
Western Conference Eastern Conference

The 2012 Major League Soccer season was the 17th season of Major League Soccer. It was also the 100th season of FIFA-sanctioned soccer in the United States, and the 34th with a national first-division league.

The Montreal Impact became the 19th MLS club, replacing a team of the same name that previously played in the NASL.

The regular season began on March 10 and concluded on October 28. The MLS Cup Playoffs began on October 31 and ended on December 1, when the LA Galaxy claimed their fourth league title by defeating the Houston Dynamo, 3–1, in MLS Cup. It was the first rematch in the Cup final since Houston defeated the New England Revolution in the 2006 and 2007 editions.

== Overview ==
=== Season format ===
The season began on March 10 and concluded with MLS Cup on December 1. The 19 teams were split into two conferences, with 10 teams in the Eastern Conference and 9 teams in the Western Conference. Each team played 34 games that were evenly divided between home and away. Western Conference teams played each conference rival three times, and played each Eastern Conference team once. Eastern Conference teams played seven of their conference rivals three times, the remaining two conference rivals twice, and each Western Conference team once.

The top three teams in each conference earned a bye to the conference semifinals, while the next two teams with the most points in each conference earned wild card berths. The wild card round included two single-elimination matches where the winners advanced to the conference semifinals. In all rounds, draws were broken with two 15-minute periods of extra time, followed by penalty kicks if necessary. The away goals rule was not used in any round.

The team with the most points in the regular season was awarded the MLS Supporters' Shield and qualified for the CONCACAF Champions League. Additionally, the winner of MLS Cup, and the runner-up, also qualified for the CONCACAF Champions League. An additional berth in the Champions League was also awarded to the winner of the U.S. Open Cup. If a team qualified for multiple berths into the Champions League, then additional berths were awarded to the highest overall finishing MLS team(s) not already qualified. Also, Toronto FC, Vancouver Whitecaps FC, and Montreal Impact, as Canadian-based teams, could not qualify for the CONCACAF Champions League through MLS, and had to instead qualify through the Canadian Championship.

=== Stadiums and locations ===
Team	Stadium	Capacity
Chicago Fire	Toyota Park	20,000
Chivas USA	Home Depot Center	27,000
Colorado Rapids	Dick's Sporting Goods Park	18,061
Columbus Crew	Columbus Crew Stadium	22,555
D.C. United	RFK Stadium	45,596
FC Dallas	FC Dallas Stadium	21,193
Houston Dynamo	Robertson Stadium	32,000
LA Galaxy	Home Depot Center	27,000
Montreal Impact	Saputo Stadium	20,801
New England Revolution	Gillette Stadium	68,756
New York Red Bulls	Red Bull Arena	25,000
Philadelphia Union	PPL Park	18,500
Portland Timbers	Jeld-Wen Field	18,627
Real Salt Lake	Rio Tinto Stadium	20,213
San Jose Earthquakes	Buck Shaw Stadium	10,525
Seattle Sounders FC	CenturyLink Field	68,740
Sporting Kansas City	Livestrong Sporting Park	18,467
Toronto FC	BMO Field	21,566
Vancouver Whitecaps FC	BC Place	22,120

=== Personnel and sponsorships ===
Note: Flags indicate national team as has been defined under FIFA eligibility rules. Players and Managers may hold more than one non-FIFA nationality.

Team	Head coach	Captain	Shirt sponsor
Chicago Fire	(United States) Frank Klopas	(United States) Logan Pause	Quaker
Chivas USA	(United States) Robin Fraser	(Venezuela) Alejandro Moreno	Corona
Colorado Rapids	(Colombia) Óscar Pareja	(United States) Pablo Mastroeni	—
Columbus Crew	(Poland) Robert Warzycha	(United States) Chad Marshall	Barbasol
D.C. United	(United States) Ben Olsen	(Canada) Dwayne De Rosario	Volkswagen
FC Dallas	(United States) Schellas Hyndman	(United States) Ugo Ihemelu	AdvoCare
Houston Dynamo	(United States) Dominic Kinnear	(United States) Brian Ching	Greenstar Recycling
LA Galaxy	(United States) Bruce Arena	(United States) Landon Donovan	Herbalife
Montreal Impact	(United States) Jesse Marsch	(United States) Davy Arnaud	Bank of Montreal
New England Revolution	(United States) Jay Heaps	(United States) Matt Reis	UnitedHealthcare
New York Red Bulls	(Sweden) Hans Backe	(France) Thierry Henry	Red Bull
Philadelphia Union	(United States) John Hackworth	(Colombia) Carlos Valdés	Bimbo
Portland Timbers	(New Zealand) Gavin Wilkinson	(United States) Jack Jewsbury	Alaska Airlines
Real Salt Lake	(United States) Jason Kreis	(United States) Kyle Beckerman	XanGo
San Jose Earthquakes	(Canada) Frank Yallop	(United States) Ramiro Corrales	—
Seattle Sounders FC	(United States) Sigi Schmid	(Argentina) Mauro Rosales	Xbox
Sporting Kansas City	(United States) Peter Vermes	(Denmark) Jimmy Nielsen	—
Toronto FC	(England) Paul Mariner	(Germany) Torsten Frings	Bank of Montreal
Vancouver Whitecaps FC	(Scotland) Martin Rennie	(United States) Jay DeMerit	Bell Canada

=== Player transfers ===
Major League Soccer employs no fewer than 12 methods to acquire players. These include: signing players on transfers/free transfers as is done in most of the world; via trades; drafting players through mechanisms such as the MLS SuperDraft, MLS Supplemental Draft, or MLS Re-Entry Draft; rarely used methods which cover extreme hardship and injury replacement; signing players as Designated Players or Homegrown Players; placing a discovery claim on players; waivers; and methods peculiar to MLS such as through allocation or a weighted lottery.

==== Allocation ranking ====
The allocation ranking is the mechanism used to determine which MLS club has first priority to acquire a U.S. National Team player who signs with MLS after playing abroad, or a former MLS player who returns to the League after having gone to a club abroad for a transfer fee. The allocation rankings may also be used in the event two or more clubs file a request for the same player on the same day. The allocations will be ranked in reverse order of finish for the 2011 season, taking playoff performance into account.

Once the club uses its allocation ranking to acquire a player, it drops to the bottom of the list. A ranking can be traded, provided that part of the compensation received in return is another club's ranking. At all times, each club is assigned one ranking. The rankings reset at the end of each MLS League season.

Original ranking	Club	Date allocation used	Player signed	Player nation	Previous club	Club nation	Ref
1	Montreal Impact †	February 17, 2012	Eddie Johnson	United States	Fulham	England	
2	Philadelphia Union‡	June 26, 2012	Bakary Soumaré	Mali	US Boulogne	France	
3	New England Revolution	August 27, 2012	Juan Toja	Colombia	Aris	Greece	
4	Seattle Sounders FC∞	September 14, 2012	Marcus Hahnemann	United States	Everton	England	
5	Chivas USA						
6	San Jose Earthquakes						
7	D.C. United						
8	Portland Timbers						
9	Chicago Fire						
10	Columbus Crew						
11	Colorado Rapids	March 28, 2012	Kamani Hill	United States	Vitória	Portugal	
12	FC Dallas						
13	New York Red Bulls	August 8, 2012	Luis Robles	United States	Karlsruher SC	Germany	

† Montreal immediately traded Johnson to Seattle in exchange for Mike Fucito and Lamar Neagle.

‡Vancouver originally had the No. 2 ranking, but traded it to Philadelphia on June 26.

∞Toronto originally had the No. 4 ranking, but traded it to Seattle on September 14.

The remaining order after FC Dallas is: Vancouver Whitecaps FC (from Philadelphia), Toronto FC (from Seattle), Sporting Kansas City, Real Salt Lake, Houston Dynamo and Los Angeles Galaxy. In the unlikely event that all clubs use an allocation, the order begins anew with Montreal Impact, Colorado Rapids, Philadelphia Union, New York Red Bulls New England Revolution and Seattle Sounders FC.

==== Weighted lottery ====
Some players are assigned to MLS teams via a weighted lottery process. A team can only acquire one player per year through a weighted lottery. The players made available through lotteries include: (i) Generation adidas players signed after the MLS SuperDraft; and (ii) Draft eligible players to whom an MLS contract was offered but who failed to sign with the League prior to the SuperDraft.

The team with the worst record over its last 30 regular season games (dating back to previous season if necessary and taking playoff performance into account) will have the greatest probability of winning the lottery. Teams are not required to participate in a lottery. Players are assigned via the lottery system in order to prevent a player from potentially influencing his destination club with a strategic holdout.

The results of 2012 weighted lotteries thus far:

Lottery date	Player	Player nation	Position	Winning club	Other clubs participating	Ref
December 15, 2011	Lee Nguyen	USA	MF	Vancouver Whitecaps FC	Toronto FC, FC Dallas, Houston Dynamo, Real Salt Lake, Los Angeles Galaxy	
September 13, 2012	Marcus Tracy	USA	FW	San Jose Earthquakes	New England Revolution, FC Dallas, Philadelphia Union, Real Salt Lake, Chicago Fire, New York Red Bulls, Seattle Sounders FC	

=== Ownership changes ===
Club	New owner	Previous owner	Date
DC United	Erick Thohir and Jason Levien	D.C. United Holdings	July 10, 2012

== Standings ==
=== Eastern Conference ===
Pos	Team	Pld	W	L	T	GF	GA	GD	Pts	Qualification
1	Sporting Kansas City	34	18	7	9	42	27	+15	63	Qualification for the conference semifinals
2	D.C. United	34	17	10	7	53	43	+10	58	Qualification for the conference semifinals
3	New York Red Bulls	34	16	9	9	57	46	+11	57	Qualification for the conference semifinals
4	Chicago Fire	34	17	11	6	46	41	+5	57	Qualification for the knockout round
5	Houston Dynamo	34	14	9	11	48	41	+7	53	Qualification for the knockout round
6	Columbus Crew	34	15	12	7	44	44	0	52	
7	Montreal Impact	34	12	16	6	45	51	−6	42	
8	Philadelphia Union	34	10	18	6	37	45	−8	36	
9	New England Revolution	34	9	17	8	39	44	−5	35	
10	Toronto FC	34	5	21	8	36	62	−26	23	

Source: MLS

=== Western Conference ===
Pos	Team	Pld	W	L	T	GF	GA	GD	Pts	Qualification
1	San Jose Earthquakes	34	19	6	9	72	43	+29	66	Qualification for the conference semifinals
2	Real Salt Lake	34	17	11	6	46	35	+11	57	Qualification for the conference semifinals
3	Seattle Sounders FC	34	15	8	11	51	33	+18	56	Qualification for the conference semifinals
4	LA Galaxy	34	16	12	6	59	47	+12	54	Qualification for the knockout round
5	Vancouver Whitecaps FC	34	11	13	10	35	41	−6	43	Qualification for the knockout round
6	FC Dallas	34	9	13	12	42	47	−5	39	
7	Colorado Rapids	34	11	19	4	44	50	−6	37	
8	Portland Timbers	34	8	16	10	34	56	−22	34	
9	Chivas USA	34	7	18	9	24	58	−34	30	

Source: MLS

=== Overall standings ===
Pos	Team	Pld	W	L	T	GF	GA	GD	Pts	
1	San Jose Earthquakes (S)	34	19	6	9	72	43	+29	66	Qualification for the CONCACAF Champions League
2	Sporting Kansas City (U)	34	18	7	9	42	27	+15	63	Qualification for the CONCACAF Champions League
3	D.C. United	34	17	10	7	53	43	+10	58	
4	New York Red Bulls	34	16	9	9	57	46	+11	57	
5	Real Salt Lake	34	17	11	6	46	35	+11	57	
6	Chicago Fire	34	17	11	6	46	41	+5	57	
7	Seattle Sounders FC	34	15	8	11	51	33	+18	56	
8	LA Galaxy (C)	34	16	12	6	59	47	+12	54	Qualification for the CONCACAF Champions League
9	Houston Dynamo	34	14	9	11	48	41	+7	53	Qualification for the CONCACAF Champions League
10	Columbus Crew	34	15	12	7	44	44	0	52	
11	Vancouver Whitecaps FC	34	11	13	10	35	41	−6	43	
12	Montreal Impact	34	12	16	6	45	51	−6	42	Qualification for the CONCACAF Champions League
13	FC Dallas	34	9	13	12	42	47	−5	39	
14	Colorado Rapids	34	11	19	4	44	50	−6	37	
15	Philadelphia Union	34	10	18	6	37	45	−8	36	
16	New England Revolution	34	9	17	8	39	44	−5	35	
17	Portland Timbers	34	8	16	10	34	56	−22	34	
18	Chivas USA	34	7	18	9	24	58	−34	30	
19	Toronto FC (V)	34	5	21	8	36	62	−26	23	

Source: MLS
Rules for classification: 1) points; 2) head-to-head record; 3) goal difference; 4) number of goals scored
(C) MLS Cup champions; (S) Supporters' Shield winners; (U) U.S. Open Cup winners; (V) Canadian Championship winners

== MLS Cup playoffs ==
=== Bracket ===
Knockout round
E4	Chicago Fire	1
E5	Houston Dynamo	2
W4	Los Angeles Galaxy	2
W5	Vancouver Whitecaps FC	1

Conference semifinals
E1	Sporting Kansas City	0	1	1
E5	Houston Dynamo	2	0	2
Eastern Conference
E2	D.C. United	1	1	2
E3	New York Red Bulls	1	0	1
W1	San Jose Earthquakes	1	1	2
W4	Los Angeles Galaxy	0	3	3
Western Conference
W2	Real Salt Lake	0	0	0
W3	Seattle Sounders FC	0	1	1

Conference finals
E5	Houston Dynamo	3	1	4
E2	D.C. United	1	1	2
W4	Los Angeles Galaxy	3	1	4
W3	Seattle Sounders FC	0	2	2

MLS Cup
E5	Houston Dynamo	1
W4	Los Angeles Galaxy	3

== Player statistics ==
=== Goals ===
Rank	Player	Club	Goals
1	(United States) Chris Wondolowski	San Jose Earthquakes	27
2	(United States) Kenny Cooper	New York Red Bulls	18
3	(Costa Rica) Álvaro Saborío	Real Salt Lake	17
4	(Republic of Ireland) Robbie Keane	LA Galaxy	16
5	(France) Thierry Henry	New York Red Bulls	15
6	(United States) Eddie Johnson	Seattle Sounders FC	14
7	(United States) Alan Gordon	San Jose Earthquakes	13
7	(Colombia) Fredy Montero	Seattle Sounders FC	13
9	(United States) Will Bruin	Houston Dynamo	12
9	(United States) Chris Pontius	D.C. United	12

=== Assists ===
Rank	Player	Club	Assists
1	(United States) Graham Zusi	Sporting Kansas City	15
2	(United States) Landon Donovan	LA Galaxy	14
3	(Honduras) Marvin Chávez	San Jose Earthquakes	13
3	(Argentina) Mauro Rosales	Seattle Sounders FC	13
5	(United States) Brad Davis	Houston Dynamo	12
5	(Canada) Dwayne De Rosario	D.C. United	12
5	(France) Thierry Henry	New York Red Bulls	12
8	(Brazil) Felipe Martins	Montreal Impact	10
9	(England) David Beckham	LA Galaxy	9
9	(Colombia) David Ferreira	FC Dallas	9
9	(Republic of Ireland) Robbie Keane	LA Galaxy	9
9	(Argentina) Javier Morales	Real Salt Lake	9

=== Clean sheets ===
Rank	Player	Club	Clean sheets
1	(Denmark) Jimmy Nielsen	Sporting Kansas City	15
2	(United States) Tally Hall	Houston Dynamo	12
2	(United States) Nick Rimando	Real Salt Lake	12
4	(Puerto Rico) Josh Saunders	LA Galaxy	9
5	(United States) Joe Cannon	Vancouver Whitecaps FC	8
5	(United States) Andy Gruenebaum	Columbus Crew	8
5	(Austria) Michael Gspurning	Seattle Sounders FC	8
5	(United States) Bill Hamid	D.C. United	8
5	(United States) Zac MacMath	Philadelphia Union	8
10	(United States) Jon Busch	San Jose Earthquakes	7
10	(United States) Dan Kennedy	Chivas USA	7
10	(United States) Matt Pickens	Colorado Rapids	7

== Awards ==
=== Individual awards ===
Award	Player	Club
Most Valuable Player	(United States) Chris Wondolowski	San Jose Earthquakes
Defender of the Year	(United States) Matt Besler	Sporting Kansas City
Goalkeeper of the Year	(Denmark) Jimmy Nielsen	Sporting Kansas City
Coach of the Year	(Canada) Frank Yallop	San Jose Earthquakes
Rookie of the Year	(United States) Austin Berry	Chicago Fire
Newcomer of the Year	(Argentina) Federico Higuaín	Columbus Crew
Comeback Player of the Year	(United States) Eddie Johnson	Seattle Sounders FC
Golden Boot	(United States) Chris Wondolowski	San Jose Earthquakes
Goal of the Year	(United States) Patrick Ianni	Seattle Sounders FC
Save of the Year	(United States) Nick Rimando	Real Salt Lake
Fair Play Award	(United States) Logan Pause	Chicago Fire
Humanitarian of the Year	(United States) Chris Seitz	FC Dallas

=== Best XI ===
Goalkeeper	Defenders	Midfielders	Forwards
(Denmark) Jimmy Nielsen, Sporting KC	(Honduras) Víctor Bernárdez, San Jose (United States) Matt Besler, Sporting KC (France) Aurélien Collin, Sporting KC	(Cuba) Osvaldo Alonso, Seattle (United States) Landon Donovan, LA Galaxy (United States) Chris Pontius, D.C. United (United States) Graham Zusi, Sporting KC	(France) Thierry Henry, Red Bulls (Republic of Ireland) Robbie Keane, LA Galaxy (United States) Chris Wondolowski, San Jose

=== Player of the Month ===
Month	Player	Club	Stats
March	(France) Thierry Henry	New York Red Bulls	5G, 3A
April	(United States) Chris Wondolowski	San Jose Earthquakes	3G
May	(Canada) Dwayne De Rosario	D.C. United	4G, 3A
June	(United States) Chris Wondolowski	San Jose Earthquakes	3G
July	(Republic of Ireland) Robbie Keane	LA Galaxy	5G, 4A
August	(Canada) Patrice Bernier	Montreal Impact	3G, 3A
September	(United States) Chris Wondolowski	San Jose Earthquakes	4G, 2A
October	(United States) Chris Wondolowski	San Jose Earthquakes	5G

=== Weekly awards ===
Week	Player of the Week			AT&T Goal of the Week			MLS Save of the Week		
Week	Player	Nat	Club	Player	Nat	Club	Player	Nat	Club
Week 1	Kalif Alhassan	GHA	Portland Timbers	Kris Boyd	SCO	Portland Timbers	Nick Rimando	USA	Real Salt Lake
Week 2	David Estrada	USA	Seattle Sounders FC	Ryan Johnson	JAM	Toronto FC	Joe Cannon	USA	Vancouver Whitecaps FC
Week 3	Thierry Henry	FRA	New York Red Bulls	Thierry Henry	FRA	New York Red Bulls	Joe Cannon	USA	Vancouver Whitecaps FC
Week 4	Thierry Henry	FRA	New York Red Bulls	Darlington Nagbe	LBR	Portland Timbers	Paolo Tornaghi	ITA	Chicago Fire
Week 5	Thierry Henry	FRA	New York Red Bulls	Álvaro Saborío	CRC	Real Salt Lake	Donovan Ricketts	JAM	Montreal Impact
Week 6	Dan Kennedy	USA	Chivas USA	David Beckham	ENG	Los Angeles Galaxy	Nick Rimando	USA	Real Salt Lake
Week 7	Chris Pontius	USA	D.C. United	Kyle Beckerman	USA	Real Salt Lake	Jimmy Nielsen	DEN	Sporting Kansas City
Week 8	Steven Lenhart	USA	San Jose Earthquakes	Marco Pappa	GUA	Chicago Fire	Nick Rimando	USA	Real Salt Lake
Week 9	Chris Wondolowski	USA	San Jose Earthquakes	Fredy Montero	COL	Seattle Sounders FC	Nick Rimando	USA	Real Salt Lake
Week 10	Lee Nguyen	USA	New England Revolution	David Beckham	ENG	Los Angeles Galaxy	Sean Johnson	USA	Chicago Fire
Week 11	Dwayne De Rosario	CAN	D.C. United	Fredy Montero	COL	Seattle Sounders FC	Andy Gruenebaum	USA	Columbus Crew
Week 12	Emilio Rentería	VEN	Columbus Crew	C. J. Sapong	USA	Sporting Kansas City	Troy Perkins	USA	Portland Timbers
Week 13–15	Patrice Bernier	CAN	Montreal Impact	Júlio César	BRA	Sporting Kansas City	Jimmy Nielsen	DEN	Sporting Kansas City
Week 16	Landon Donovan	USA	Los Angeles Galaxy	Patrick Ianni	USA	Seattle Sounders FC	Jason Hernandez	USA	San Jose Earthquakes
Week 17	Danny Koevermans	NED	Toronto FC	Chris Wondolowski	USA	San Jose Earthquakes	Josh Saunders	PUR	Los Angeles Galaxy
Week 18	Álvaro Saborío	CRC	Real Salt Lake	Jack McInerney	USA	Philadelphia Union	Jimmy Nielsen	DEN	Sporting Kansas City
Week 19	Chris Wondolowski	USA	San Jose Earthquakes	David Beckham	ENG	Los Angeles Galaxy	Jimmy Nielsen	DEN	Sporting Kansas City
Week 20	Calen Carr	USA	Houston Dynamo	Jose Villarreal	USA	Los Angeles Galaxy	Matt Reis	USA	New England Revolution
Week 21	Jairo Arrieta	CRC	Columbus Crew	Saër Sène	FRA	New England Revolution	Sean Johnson	USA	Chicago Fire
Week 22	Eddie Johnson	USA	Seattle Sounders FC	Felipe Martins	BRA	Montreal Impact	Kevin Hartman	USA	FC Dallas
Week 23	Landon Donovan	USA	Los Angeles Galaxy	Sanna Nyassi	GAM	Montreal Impact	Troy Perkins	USA	Montreal Impact
Week 24	David Ferreira	COL	FC Dallas	Lamar Neagle	USA	Montreal Impact	Donovan Ricketts	JAM	Portland Timbers
Week 25	Federico Higuaín	ARG	Columbus Crew	Marco Di Vaio	ITA	Montreal Impact	Steven Smith	SCO	Portland Timbers
Week 26	Federico Higuaín	ARG	Columbus Crew	David Beckham	ENG	Los Angeles Galaxy	Matt Pickens	USA	Colorado Rapids
Week 27	Eddie Johnson	USA	Seattle Sounders FC	Eddie Johnson	USA	Seattle Sounders FC	Nick Rimando	USA	Real Salt Lake
Week 28	Sean Johnson	USA	Chicago Fire	Fredy Montero	COL	Seattle Sounders FC	Marcelo Sarvas	BRA	Los Angeles Galaxy
Week 29	Thierry Henry	FRA	New York Red Bulls	Javier Morales	ARG	Real Salt Lake	Nick Rimando	USA	Real Salt Lake
Week 30	Chris Wondolowski	USA	San Jose Earthquakes	Álvaro Saborío	CRC	Real Salt Lake	Nick Rimando	USA	Real Salt Lake
Week 31	Thierry Henry	FRA	New York Red Bulls	Robbie Keane	IRE	Los Angeles Galaxy	Jimmy Nielsen	DEN	Sporting Kansas City
Week 32	Chris Wondolowski	USA	San Jose Earthquakes	Jack Jewsbury	USA	Portland Timbers	Jimmy Nielsen	DEN	Sporting Kansas City
Week 33	Brad Evans	USA	Seattle Sounders FC	Jacob Peterson	USA	Sporting Kansas City			
Week 34	Kenny Cooper	USA	New York Red Bulls						

=== Scoring ===
- First goal of the season: Sébastien Le Toux for Vancouver Whitecaps FC against Montreal Impact, 3 minutes 1 second (March 10, 2012)
- Hat-tricks of the season:
  - David Estrada for Seattle Sounders FC against Toronto FC (March 17, 2012)
  - Thierry Henry for New York Red Bulls against Montreal Impact (March 31, 2012)
  - Chris Pontius for D.C. United against New York Red Bulls (April 22, 2012)
  - Álvaro Saborío for Real Salt Lake against Portland Timbers (July 7, 2012)
  - Chris Wondolowski for San Jose Earthquakes against Real Salt Lake (July 14, 2012)
  - Fredy Montero for Seattle Sounders FC against Chivas USA (August 25, 2012)
  - Álvaro Saborío for Real Salt Lake against Chivas USA (September 29, 2012)
  - Chris Wondolowski for San Jose Earthquakes against Colorado Rapids (October 6, 2012)
- Fastest hat-trick of the season:
  - Álvaro Saborío for Real Salt Lake against Portland Timbers, 16 minutes and 8 seconds (July 7, 2012)

=== Discipline ===
- First yellow card of the season: Milovan Mirošević for Columbus Crew against Colorado Rapids, 40 minutes (March 10, 2012)
- First red card of the season: Stephen McCarthy for New England Revolution against Sporting Kansas City, 14 minutes (March 17, 2012)

== Related competitions ==
=== International competitions and friendlies ===
==== CONCACAF Champions League ====
Prior to the start of the MLS regular season, Toronto FC defeated Los Angeles Galaxy while Mexican side Santos Laguna defeated Seattle Sounders FC in two of the 2011–12 CONCACAF Champions League quarterfinal series. Toronto FC then lost 3–7 on aggregate in the semifinal with Santos Laguna.

In the 2012–13 CCL, Los Angeles Galaxy, Seattle Sounders, Houston Dynamo and Real Salt Lake earned group stage spots (the preliminary round has been eliminated). The Canadian representative, determined by the 2012 Canadian Championship, was Toronto FC.

At the end of the groups stages, the Los Angeles Galaxy, Seattle Sounders, and Houston Dynamo qualified for the quarterfinals, which will be played in March 2013.

==== MLS All-Star Game ====
The 2012 MLS All-Star Game was played on July 25 at PPL Park in Chester, Pennsylvania, home stadium of the Philadelphia Union. As has been the format every year since 2005, the MLS All-Stars played an international club; the 2012 opponent was England's Chelsea FC, 2012 champions of both the FA Cup and UEFA Champions League and visiting side in the 2006 MLS All-Star Game (when they lost to the All-Stars, 1–0, at Toyota Park in Bridgeview, Illinois). The MLS All-Stars won the game 3–2.

=== Domestic competitions ===
==== Lamar Hunt U.S. Open Cup ====
For the 2012 Lamar Hunt U.S. Open Cup tournament, U.S. Soccer has increased the size of the main tournament from 40 to 64 clubs, assembling the competition so that all U.S.-based Major League Soccer clubs gain entry. On August 8, 2012, Sporting Kansas City defeated the Seattle Sounders on penalties to win the franchise's second open cup title.

==== Canadian Championship ====
The three Canadian-based MLS clubs, Toronto FC, Montreal Impact and Vancouver Whitecaps FC, along with NASL club FC Edmonton, competed for the Voyageurs Cup, Canada's national championship trophy. The tournament is organized in a knockout format with two-legged ties in both the semifinals and final, with the away goals rule in place. Toronto defeated Vancouver in the finals, their fourth consecutive national championship, and qualified for the 2012–13 CONCACAF Champions League.

=== League Competitions ===
==== MLS Cup ====
The MLS Cup playoffs took place after the conclusion of the regular season. For 2012, the playoff structure underwent several changes:

- The playoffs will no longer feature wild cards and the possibility of "crossovers" (i.e. teams from opposite conferences playing in the early rounds). Instead, the top five clubs in each conference's standings will qualify for the playoffs and will play in the following manner:
  - The 4th place team will host the 5th place team in a single "play-in" match, with the winner advancing to the conference semifinals.
  - The Conference Semifinals will again be a two-game aggregate goal setup as before (with extra time and penalty kicks employed if the aggregate is level after 180 minutes). The 1st place team will play the winner of the 4th/5th game, while the 2nd and 3rd place teams play each other. The lower-seeded team will host the first leg of each semifinal.
  - The semifinal winners will play each other in the Conference Finals, which will be altered to a two-game aggregate series patterned after the semifinal round (before this year, this round was a single-game format).
- The Conference Final winners will advance to the MLS Cup Championship Game, which for the first time will be played at the home stadium of the finalist with the better regular season point total; before this season, the game was played at a predetermined site.

== Coaches ==
=== Eastern Conference ===
- Chicago Fire: Frank Klopas
- Columbus Crew: Robert Warzycha
- D.C. United: Ben Olsen
- Houston Dynamo: Dominic Kinnear
- Montreal Impact: Jesse Marsch
- New England Revolution: Jay Heaps
- New York Red Bulls: Hans Backe
- Philadelphia Union: Peter Nowak and John Hackworth
- Sporting Kansas City: Peter Vermes
- Toronto FC: Paul Mariner

=== Western Conference ===
- Chivas USA: Robin Fraser
- Colorado Rapids: Óscar Pareja
- FC Dallas: Schellas Hyndman
- Los Angeles Galaxy: Bruce Arena
- Portland Timbers: John Spencer and Gavin Wilkinson
- Real Salt Lake: Jason Kreis
- San Jose Earthquakes: Frank Yallop
- Seattle Sounders FC: Sigi Schmid
- Vancouver Whitecaps FC: Martin Rennie
