= MLS Goalkeeper of the Year Award =

Sporting award

MLS Goalkeeper of the Year Award, known as the Allstate MLS Goalkeeper of the Year Award for sponsorship purposes, is an annual Major League Soccer award established in 1996. It is voted on by media, MLS players and club management based on regular-season performance. Andre Blake has won the award three times, more than any other goalkeeper.

== Winners ==
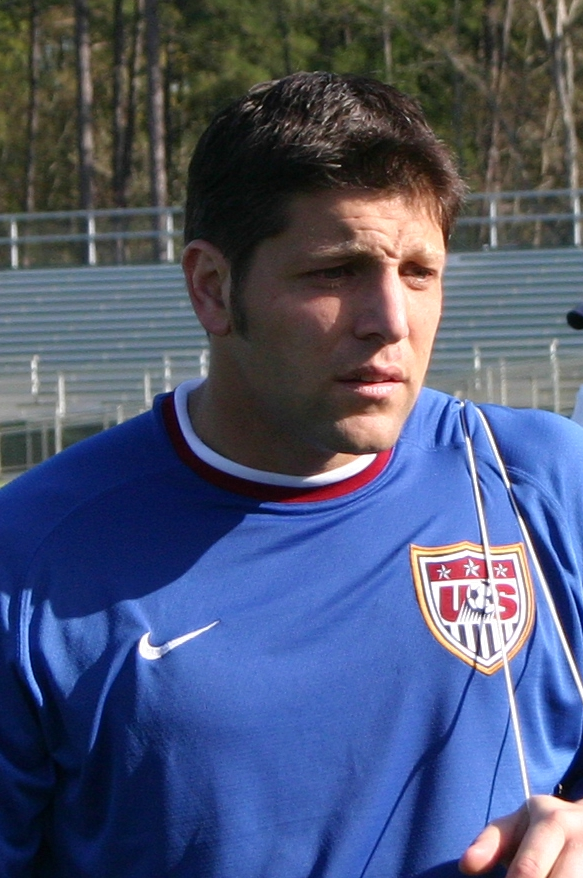
Tony Meola is the only player in MLS history to win both MVP and Goalkeeper of the year.

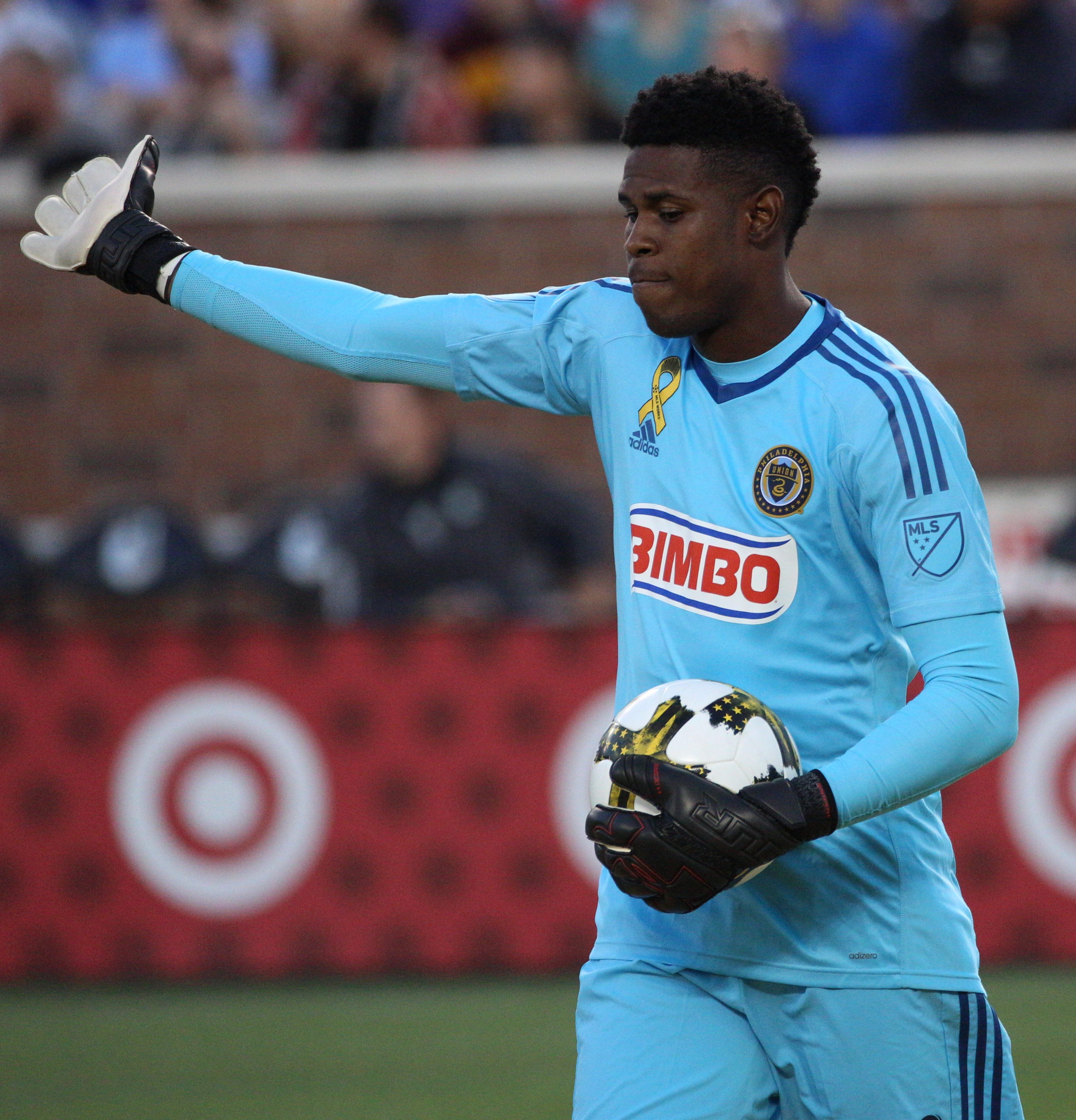
With three wins, Andre Blake has won the award more than any other goalkeeper.

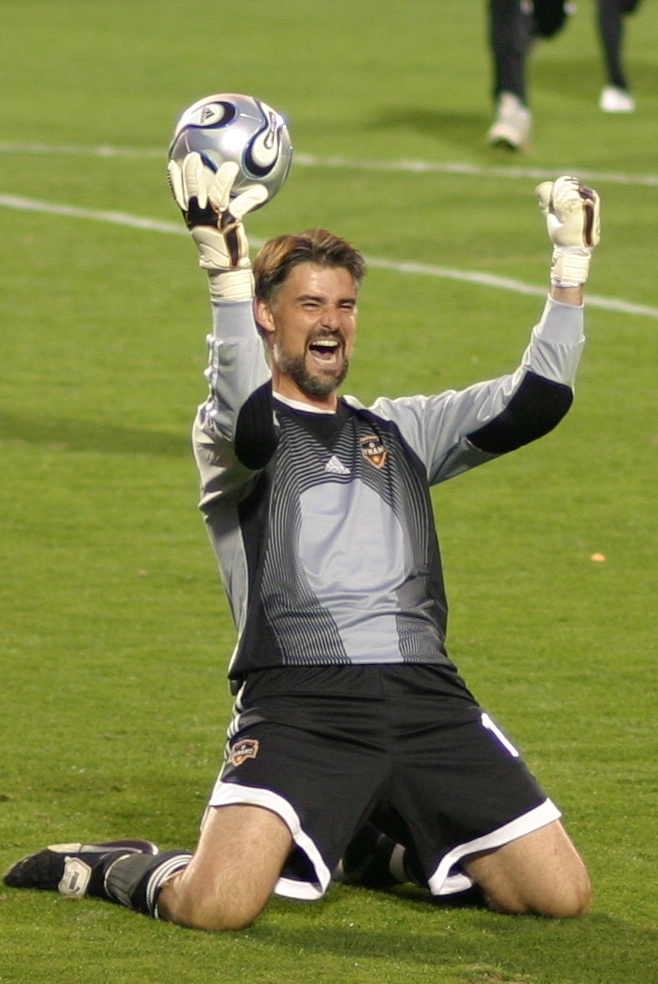
Pat Onstad became the first Canadian goalkeeper to win the award.

Season	Winner	Club	Second	Third	Fourth	Fifth
1996	(United States) Mark Dodd	Dallas Burn	Jorge Campos	Dave Salzwedel	Mark Dougherty	
1997	(United States) Brad Friedel	Columbus Crew	Walter Zenga	Tony Meola	Mike Ammann	
1998	(United States) Zach Thornton	Chicago Fire	Kevin Hartman	David Kramer	Ian Feuer	
1999	(United States) Kevin Hartman	Los Angeles Galaxy	Zach Thornton	Matt Jordan	Tom Presthus	
2000	(United States) Tony Meola	Kansas City Wizards	Joe Cannon	Kevin Hartman	Zach Thornton	
2001	(United States) Tim Howard	MetroStars	Joe Cannon	Zach Thornton	Tom Presthus	
2002	(United States) Joe Cannon	San Jose Earthquakes	Nick Rimando	Tim Howard	Kevin Hartman	
2003	(Canada) Pat Onstad	San Jose Earthquakes	Zach Thornton	Kevin Hartman	Adin Brown	
2004	(United States) Joe Cannon (2)	Colorado Rapids	Jon Busch	Bo Oshoniyi	Pat Onstad	
2005	(Canada) Pat Onstad (2)	San Jose Earthquakes	Joe Cannon	Matt Reis	Bo Oshoniyi	
2006	(United States) Troy Perkins	D.C. United	Matt Reis	Pat Onstad	Preston Burpo	Dario Sala
2007	(United States) Brad Guzan	Chivas USA	Pat Onstad	Matt Reis	Joe Cannon	Troy Perkins
2008	(United States) Jon Busch	Chicago Fire	Matt Reis	Jon Conway	Greg Sutton	William Hesmer
2009	(United States) Zach Thornton (2)	Chivas USA	Pat Onstad	Kasey Keller	Matt Reis	Jon Busch
2010	(Jamaica) Donovan Ricketts	Los Angeles Galaxy	Kevin Hartman	Jimmy Nielsen	Joe Cannon	Zach Thornton
2011	(United States) Kasey Keller	Seattle Sounders FC	Faryd Mondragón	Kevin Hartman	Nick Rimando	Josh Saunders
2012	(Denmark) Jimmy Nielsen	Sporting Kansas City	Josh Saunders	Dan Kennedy	Michael Gspurning	Nick Rimando
2013	(Jamaica) Donovan Ricketts (2)	Portland Timbers	Nick Rimando	Jimmy Nielsen	Luis Robles	Tally Hall
2014	(United States) Bill Hamid	D.C. United	Nick Rimando	Steve Clark	Jaime Penedo	Joe Bendik
2015	(United States) Luis Robles	New York Red Bulls	David Ousted	Bill Hamid	Chris Konopka	Evan Bush
2016	(Jamaica) Andre Blake	Philadelphia Union	Luis Robles	Tim Howard	Bill Hamid	David Bingham
2017	(United States) Tim Melia	Sporting Kansas City	Andre Blake	Stefan Frei	Alex Bono	Sean Johnson
2018	(United States) Zack Steffen	Columbus Crew	Stefan Frei	Luis Robles	Tim Melia	Brad Guzan
2019	(Italy) Vito Mannone	Minnesota United FC	Tim Melia	Sean Johnson	Brad Guzan	Matt Turner
2020	(Jamaica) Andre Blake (2)	Philadelphia Union	Matt Turner	Eloy Room	Pedro Gallese	Stefan Frei
2021	(United States) Matt Turner	New England Revolution	Andre Blake	Joe Willis	William Yarbrough	Maxime Crépeau
2022	(Jamaica) Andre Blake (3)	Philadelphia Union	Djordje Petrović	Drake Callender	Roman Celentano	Brad Stuver
2023	(Switzerland) Roman Bürki	St. Louis City SC	Roman Celentano	Pedro Gallese		
2024	(Croatia) Kristijan Kahlina	Charlotte FC	Hugo Lloris	Patrick Schulte		
2025	(Canada) Dayne St. Clair	Minnesota United FC	Matt Freese	Yohei Takaoka		

== Voting finishes (by player) ==
Player	Wins	Top two	Top three
Andre Blake	3	5	5
Jon Busch	1	2	2
Jorge Campos	0	1	1
Joe Cannon	2	5	5
Steve Clark	0	0	1
Jon Conway	0	0	1
Mark Dodd	1	1	1
Stefan Frei	0	1	2
Brad Friedel	1	1	1
Brad Guzan	1	1	1
Bill Hamid	1	1	1
Kevin Hartman	1	3	6
Tim Howard	1	1	3
Sean Johnson	0	0	1
Matt Jordan	0	0	1
Kasey Keller	1	1	2
Dan Kennedy	0	0	1
Chris Konopka	0	0	1
David Kramer	0	0	1
Vito Mannone	1	1	1
Tim Melia	1	2	2
Tony Meola	1	1	2
Faryd Mondragón	0	1	1
Jimmy Nielsen	1	1	2
Pat Onstad	2	4	5
Bo Oshoniyi	0	0	1
David Ousted	0	1	1
Troy Perkins	1	1	1
Matt Reis	0	2	4
Donovan Ricketts	2	2	2
Nick Rimando	0	3	3
Luis Robles	1	2	3
Eloy Room	0	0	1
Dave Salzwedel	0	0	1
Josh Saunders	0	1	1
Zack Steffen	1	1	1
Zach Thornton	2	4	5
Matt Turner	1	2	2
Joe Willis	0	0	1
Walter Zenga	0	1	1
Drake Callender	0	0	1
Djordje Petrović	0	1	0
Roman Bürki	1	0	0
Kristijan Kahlina	1	0	0
Hugo Lloris	0	1	0
Patrick Schulte	0	0	1
Dayne St. Clair	1	0	0

== Wins by team ==
Club	Wins
Kansas City Wizards/Sporting KC	3
Philadelphia Union	3
San Jose Earthquakes	3
Chicago Fire	2
Chivas USA	2
Columbus Crew	2
D.C. United	2
LA Galaxy	2
Minnesota United FC	2
NY/NJ MetroStars/New York Red Bulls	2
Colorado Rapids	1
Dallas Burn/FC Dallas	1
New England Revolution	1
Portland Timbers	1
Seattle Sounders FC	1
St. Louis City SC	1
Charlotte FC	1

== Wins by nationality ==
Nationality	Wins
United States	18
Jamaica	5
Canada	3
Denmark	1
Italy	1
Switzerland	1
Croatia	1
