= Kassoum Department =

Coordinates: 13°05′N 3°18′W

Kassoum
- Department
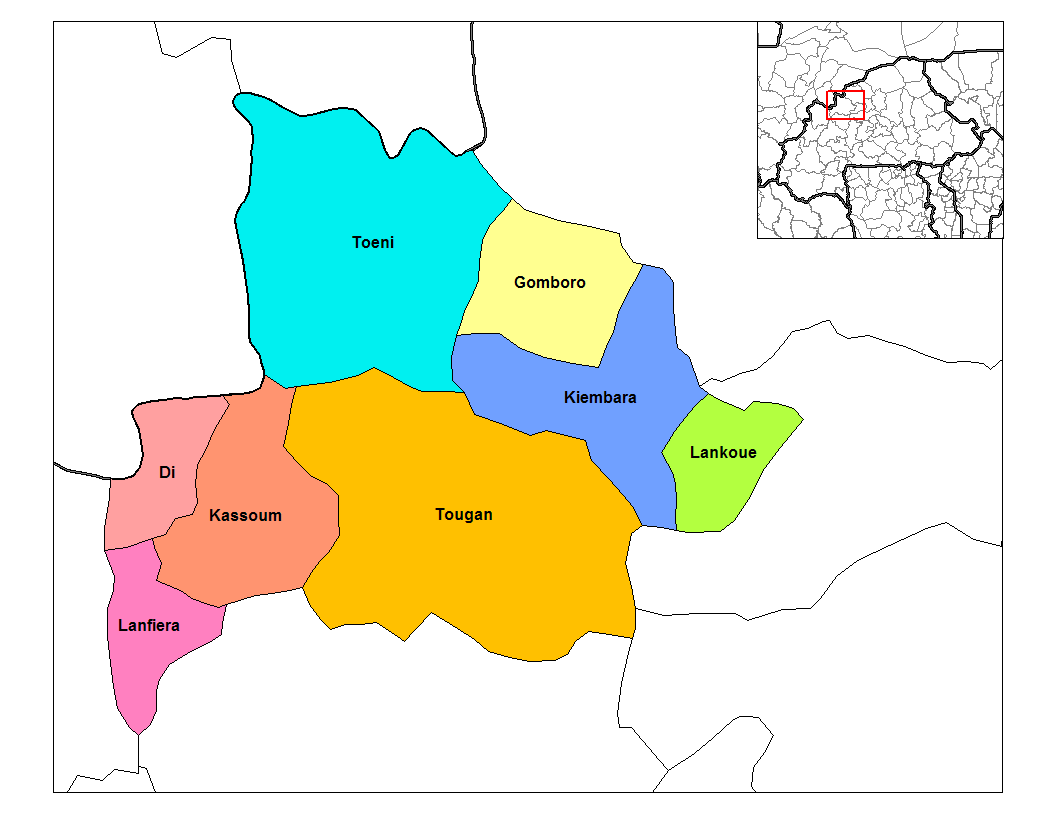
- Kassoum Department location in the province
- Country: Burkina Faso
- Province: Sourou Province

Area
  - Total: 264.9 sq mi (686.1 km^{2})

Population (2019 census)
  - Total: 25,694
  - Density: 96.99/sq mi (37.45/km^{2})
- Time zone: UTC+0 (GMT 0)

Kassoum is a department or commune of Sourou Province in north-western Burkina Faso. Its capital lies at the town of Kassoum.
