= Tougan Department =

Coordinates: 13.0667°N 3.0667°W

Tougan
- Department
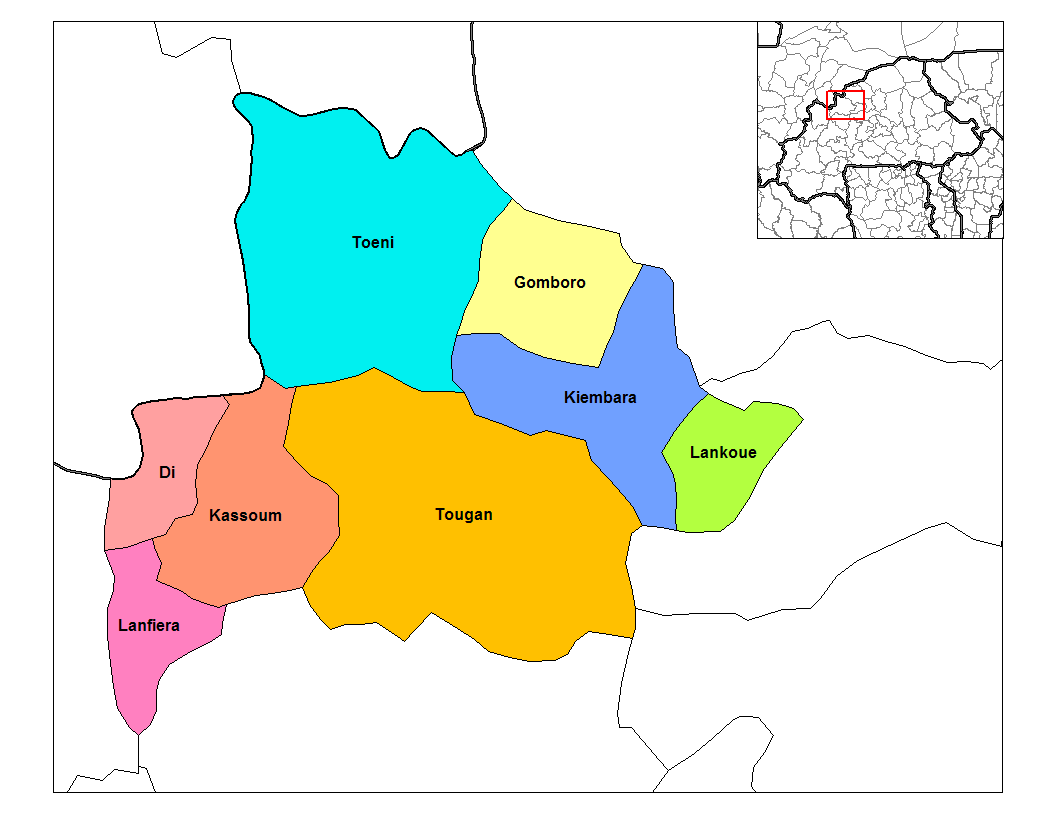
- Tougan Department location in the province
- Country: Burkina Faso
- Province: Sourou Province

Area
  - Department: 680 sq mi (1,760 km^{2})

Population (2019 census)
  - Department: 89,154
  - Density: 131/sq mi (50.7/km^{2})
  - Urban: 26,348
- Time zone: UTC+0 (GMT 0)

Tougan is a department or commune of Sourou Province in north-western Burkina Faso. Its capital is the town of Tougan.
