= Denon (disambiguation) =

Denon is a Japanese electronics company.

Denon may also refer to:

- Denon Records, Japanese audiophile record label
- Denon, fictional planet in the Star Wars franchise.
- Kassoum Denon, Malian politician
- Vivant Denon (Dominique Vivant, Baron Denon), French curator, artist and archaeologist, first Director of the Louvre Museum
- A track by Camera Obscura (band)
