= Lankoue Department =

Coordinates: 13°15′N 2°35′W

Lankoue
- Department
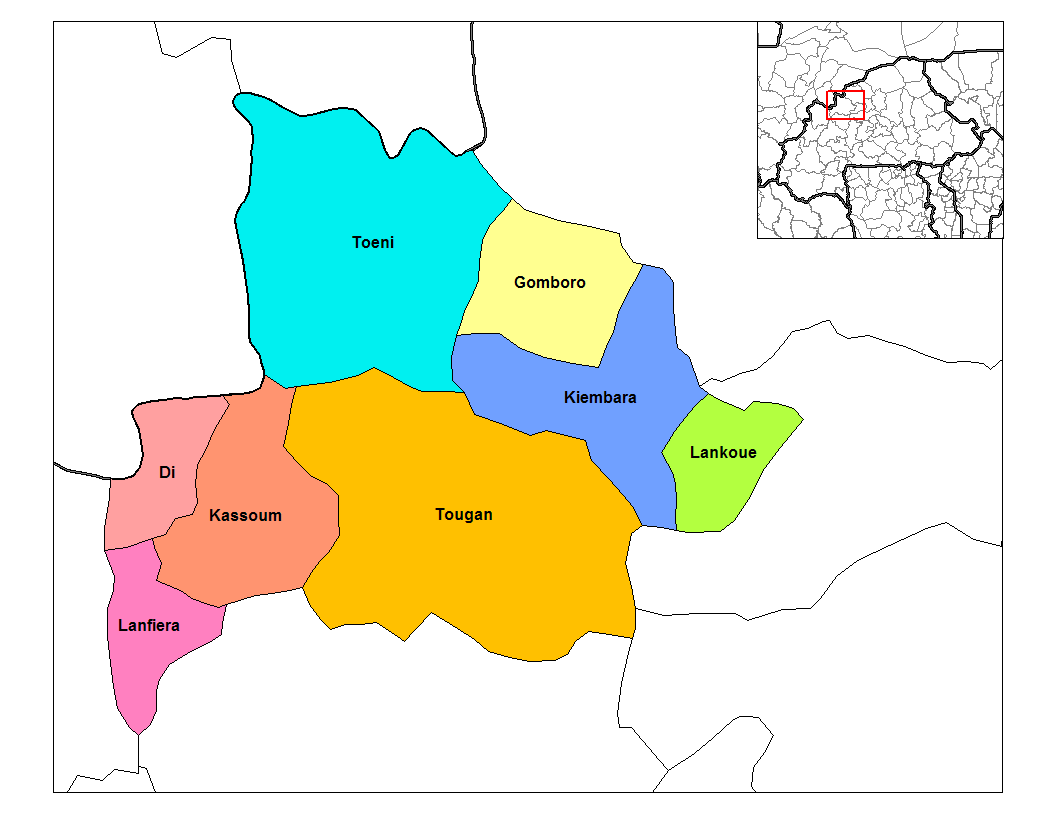
- Lankoue Department location in the province
- Country: Burkina Faso
- Province: Sourou Province
- Time zone: UTC+0 (GMT 0)

Lankoue is a department or commune of Sourou Province in north-western Burkina Faso. Its capital lies at the town of Lankoue.
