= Mamadou Philippe Karambiri =

Burkinabè evangelical Christian pastor

- Born: Mamadou Karambiri; March 7, 1947 (age 79); Tougan, Burkina Faso
- Education: Toulouse 1 University Capitole
- Occupations: Gospel preacher, pastor, leader of International Evangelism Center - African Interior Mission
- Spouse: Hortense Palm
- Children: Sarah, Samuel, Anne Daniella and David

Mamadou Philippe Karambiri is a Burkinabé evangelical charismatic Pastor, born March 7, 1947, in Tougan. He is the president of the International Evangelism Center - African Interior Mission which he founded in 1987. He was knighted by the National Order of Burkina Faso in 2005 and in 2007 he received a honoris causa doctorate in Divinity from the Logos Christian University of Florida in the United States.

== Biography ==
Karambiri was born on March 7, 1947, in Tougan in a Muslim family. During a meeting with young French evangelical missionaries and after witnessing the appearance of Jesus Christ, while preparing his State doctorate in financial economics in Toulouse in February 1975, he experienced a new birth. In an interview granted in December 2015, he gives details of this spiritual turning point. He underlines that the important thing is not first to change religion, but to discover who Jesus Christ is, and to enter into relation with him. After his conversion and during his stay in France as a student, he attended the "Assembly of God of Toulouse" church. Back in Burkina Faso, he was Director of Promotion at the National Office of Foreign Trade, then Commercial Director of Faso Fani and finally Director General of SO.VOL.COM.

=== Ministry ===
In 1985, he started a prayer group with his family which reached 500 people in 1987. That same year, he founded the International Evangelism Center - African Interior Mission in Ouagadougou. In January 1990, he resigned from his secular duties to become Pastor full time.

== Personal life ==
He marries Marie Sophie Tou, a state nurse on duty in pediatrics at the Yalgado Ouédraogo Hospital. They have four children, two girls and two boys. His wife died on March 10, 2008. Since then, he remarried on May 29, 2010, with Hortense Palm, who occupies a pastoral ministry in the church.

== Awards ==
In 2005, he was made a knight of the national order of Burkina Faso. In 2007, he received a honoris causa doctorate in Divinity from the Logos Christian University of Florida in the United States.
