= 2010 Major League Soccer season =

15th season of Major League Soccer

Major League Soccer
- Season: 2010
- Teams: 16
- MLS Cup: Colorado Rapids (1st title)
- Supporters' Shield: Los Angeles Galaxy (3rd shield)
- Champions League: Los Angeles Galaxy; Colorado Rapids; FC Dallas; Seattle Sounders FC
- SuperLiga: Real Salt Lake; New York Red Bulls; Columbus Crew; S.J. Earthquakes
- Matches: 240
- Goals: 591 (2.46 per match)
- Top goalscorer: Chris Wondolowski (18 goals)
- Biggest home win: NE 0–5 RSL (July 2)
- Biggest away win: CHV 4–0 NE (May 5); LA 4–0 SEA (May 8); SEA 4–0 CLB (Sept 18)
- Highest scoring: 7 goals: HOU 4–3 CHI (August 21); KCW 4–3 HOU (September 22)
- Longest winning run: 5 wins: Real Salt Lake (May 1 – May 29); Seattle Sounders FC (Sep 18 – Oct 15)
- Longest unbeaten run: 18 matches: FC Dallas (May 27 – Oct 16)
- Longest winless run: 10 matches: Houston Dynamo (May 22 – Aug 21)
- Longest losing run: 6 losses: C.D. Chivas USA (May 8 – June 26)
- Highest attendance: CHI @ SEA: 36,386
- Lowest attendance: CHV @ NE: 5,990
- Total attendance: 4,002,053
- Average attendance: 16,675

Locations of teams for the 2010 Major League Soccer season
Western Conference Eastern Conference

The 2010 Major League Soccer season was the 15th season of Major League Soccer. It was also the 98th season of FIFA-sanctioned soccer in the United States, and the 32nd with a national first-division league.

Negotiations between the league and the players' union resulted in a new collective bargaining agreement being agreed to on March 20, 2010. The new Designated Player Rule permitted teams to sign two such players, up from one under the previous rule, and pay a luxury tax of $250,000 for the right to sign a third.

The Philadelphia Union joined the league as its 16th team. The club's first two home games were played at Lincoln Financial Field while the construction of their permanent home, PPL Park in Chester, was being completed. The New York Red Bulls opened their new stadium, Red Bull Arena, on March 27 against the Chicago Fire.

The regular season began on March 25, and concluded on October 24. The LA Galaxy won the Supporters' Shield by one point over Real Salt Lake. The 2010 MLS Cup Playoffs began on October 28, and concluded with MLS Cup 2010 on November 21. The Colorado Rapids won their first MLS Cup by defeating the FC Dallas, 2-1, at BMO Field in Toronto. It was the first MLS Cup to be played outside the United States.

== Overview ==
=== Season format ===
The season began on March 25 and concluded with MLS Cup on November 21. The 16 teams were split evenly into two conferences. For the first time in league history, the season had a balanced schedule where each team played every other team in the league once at home and once away for a total of 30 games.

The top two teams from each conference automatically qualified for the MLS Cup Playoffs. In addition, the four highest remaining point totals, regardless of conference, also qualified. In the first round, aggregate goals over two matches determined the winners. The conference finals were played as a single match, and the winners advanced to MLS Cup. In all rounds, draws were broken with two 15-minute periods of extra time, followed by penalty kicks if necessary. The away goals rule was not used in any round.

The team with the most points in the regular season was awarded the MLS Supporters' Shield and qualified for the CONCACAF Champions League. Additionally, the winner of MLS Cup, and the runner-up, also qualified for the CONCACAF Champions League. An additional berth in the Champions League was also awarded to the winner of the U.S. Open Cup. If a team qualified for multiple berths into the Champions League, then additional berths were awarded to the highest overall finishing MLS team(s) not already qualified. Also, Toronto FC, as a Canadian-based team, could not qualify for the CONCACAF Champions League through MLS, and had to instead qualify through the Canadian Championship.

Automatic qualification for the U.S. Open Cup was awarded to the top six overall finishers. The rest of the U.S.-based MLS teams had to qualify for the remaining two berths via a series of play-in games.

=== Stadiums and locations ===
Team	Stadium	Capacity
Chicago Fire	Toyota Park	20,000
Chivas USA	Home Depot Center	27,000
Colorado Rapids	Dick's Sporting Goods Park	18,061
Columbus Crew	Columbus Crew Stadium	22,555
D.C. United	RFK Stadium	46,000
FC Dallas	Pizza Hut Park	21,193
Houston Dynamo	Robertson Stadium	32,000
Kansas City Wizards	CommunityAmerica Ballpark	10,385
LA Galaxy	Home Depot Center	27,000
New England Revolution	Gillette Stadium	68,756
New York Red Bulls	Red Bull Arena	25,000
Philadelphia Union	Lincoln Financial Field; PPL Park	67,594; 18,500
Real Salt Lake	Rio Tinto Stadium	20,213
San Jose Earthquakes	Buck Shaw Stadium	10,525
Seattle Sounders FC	Qwest Field	68,740
Toronto FC	BMO Field	21,566

=== Personnel and sponsorships ===
Note: Flags indicate national team as has been defined under FIFA eligibility rules. Players and Managers may hold more than one non-FIFA nationality.

Team	Manager	Captain	Shirt sponsor
Chicago Fire	(Mexico) Carlos de los Cobos	(United States) Brian McBride	Best Buy
Chivas USA	(United States) Martin Vasquez	(United States) Jonathan Bornstein	Tiendas Extra
Colorado Rapids	(England) Gary Smith	(United States) Pablo Mastroeni	—
Columbus Crew	(Poland) Robert Warzycha	(United States) Frankie Hejduk	Glidden
D.C. United	(United States) Ben Olsen	(Bolivia) Jaime Moreno	Volkswagen
FC Dallas	(United States) Schellas Hyndman	(United States) Daniel Hernández	—
Houston Dynamo	(United States) Dominic Kinnear	(United States) Brian Ching	Amigo Energy
Kansas City Wizards	(United States) Peter Vermes	(United States) Davy Arnaud	—
LA Galaxy	(United States) Bruce Arena	(United States) Landon Donovan	Herbalife
New England Revolution	(Scotland) Steve Nicol	(Grenada) Shalrie Joseph	—
New York Red Bulls	(Sweden) Hans Backe	(Colombia) Juan Pablo Ángel	Red Bull
Philadelphia Union	(Poland) Piotr Nowak	(United States) Danny Califf	—
Real Salt Lake	(United States) Jason Kreis	(United States) Kyle Beckerman	XanGo
San Jose Earthquakes	(Canada) Frank Yallop	(United States) Ramiro Corrales	Amway Global
Seattle Sounders FC	(United States) Sigi Schmid	(United States) Kasey Keller	Xbox LIVE
Toronto FC	(Canada) Nick Dasovic	(Canada) Dwayne De Rosario	Bank of Montreal

=== Managerial changes ===
Team	Outgoing coach	Manner of departure	Date of vacancy	Table	Incoming coach	Date of appointment	Table
Philadelphia Union	Expansion Team				(Poland) Piotr Nowak	May 29, 2009	Pre-season
New York Red Bulls	(United States) Richie Williams	End of interim period	August 21, 2009	7th East ('09)	(Sweden) Hans Backe	January 7, 2010	Pre-season
Toronto FC	(England) Chris Cummins	Contract expiration	October 27, 2009	5th East ('09)	(United States) Preki	November 18, 2009	Pre-season
D.C. United	(United States) Tom Soehn	Resigned	November 3, 2009	4th East ('09)	(United States) Curt Onalfo	December 28, 2009	Pre-season
Chivas USA	(United States) Preki	Mutual consent	November 12, 2009	4th West ('09)	(United States) Martín Vásquez	December 2, 2009	Pre-season
Chicago Fire	(Costa Rica) Denis Hamlett	Fired	November 24, 2009	2nd East ('09)	(Mexico) Carlos de los Cobos	January 11, 2010	Pre-season
D.C. United	(United States) Curt Onalfo	Fired	August 4, 2010	8th East	(United States) Ben Olsen	August 4, 2010	8th East
Toronto FC	(United States) Preki	Fired	September 14, 2010	3rd East	(Canada) Nick Dasovic	September 14, 2010	3rd East

== Results table ==
Home \ Away	CHI	CHV	COL	CLB	DCU	FCD	HOU	KCW	LAG	NER	NY	PHI	RSL	SJE	SEA	TOR
Chicago Fire		1–1	2–2	2–0	0–0	1–1	2–0	0–2	1–1	2–1	0–0	2–1	0–1	1–2	0–1	0–0
Chivas USA	1–4		0–1	3–1	1–0	1–2	0–2	1–2	1–2	2–0	2–0	1–1	1–2	3–2	0–0	3–0
Colorado Rapids	2–2	3–0		1–0	0–1	1–1	3–0	1–1	0–1	3–0	1–1	4–1	2–2	1–0	1–0	3–1
Columbus Crew	2–1	1–0	3–1		2–0	0–0	3–0	0–1	0–2	3–2	2–0	3–1	1–0	0–0	0–4	2–0
D.C. United	0–2	3–2	0–1	0–1		1–3	1–3	2–1	1–2	0–2	0–2	2–0	0–0	0–2	0–1	2–3
FC Dallas	3–0	1–0	2–2	2–2	1–0		1–1	1–0	0–1	2–2	2–2	3–1	2–0	2–0	2–2	1–0
Houston Dynamo	4–3	3–0	2–2	0–0	2–0	0–1		0–2	3–0	1–2	2–2	2–3	2–1	1–2	2–1	1–2
Kansas City Wizards	2–2	0–1	1–0	0–1	4–0	1–3	4–3		0–0	4–1	0–3	2–0	1–1	4–1	1–2	1–0
LA Galaxy	2–3	2–0	1–3	3–1	2–1	2–1	4–1	0–2		1–0	0–2	3–1	2–1	2–2	3–1	0–0
New England Revolution	0–1	0–4	1–2	2–2	1–0	1–1	1–0	1–0	2–0		3–2	1–2	1–2	0–0	3–1	4–1
New York Red Bulls	1–0	1–0	3–1	1–3	0–0	2–1	2–1	1–0	0–1	2–0		2–1	0–0	2–0	0–1	1–0
Philadelphia Union	1–0	3–0	1–1	1–2	3–2	1–1	1–1	1–1	0–1	1–1	2–1		1–1	1–2	3–1	2–1
Real Salt Lake	1–0	1–1	1–1	2–0	3–0	2–0	3–1	4–1	1–0	5–0	0–0	3–0		0–0	3–1	2–1
San Jose Earthquakes	0–3	3–0	1–0	2–2	1–1	0–0	0–1	1–0	1–0	2–0	4–0	1–0	0–3		0–1	1–3
Seattle Sounders FC	2–1	2–1	1–1	1–1	2–3	1–1	2–0	1–0	0–4	3–0	0–1	2–0	0–0	0–1		3–2
Toronto FC	4–1	2–1	1–0	2–2	0–1	1–1	1–1	0–0	0–0	1–0	1–4	2–1	0–0	2–3	2–0	

Updated to match(es) played on March 15, 2011. Source: official website
Legend: Blue = home team win; Yellow = draw; Red = away team win.

== Standings ==
=== Eastern Conference ===
Pos	Team	Pld	W	L	T	GF	GA	GD	Pts	Qualification
1	New York Red Bulls	30	15	9	6	38	29	+9	51	Qualification for the conference semifinals
2	Columbus Crew	30	14	8	8	40	34	+6	50	Qualification for the conference semifinals
3	Kansas City Wizards	30	11	13	6	36	35	+1	39	
4	Chicago Fire	30	9	12	9	37	38	−1	36	
5	Toronto FC	30	9	13	8	33	41	−8	35	
6	New England Revolution	30	9	16	5	32	50	−18	32	
7	Philadelphia Union	30	8	15	7	35	49	−14	31	
8	D.C. United	30	6	20	4	21	47	−26	22	

Source: MLS

=== Western Conference ===
Pos	Team	Pld	W	L	T	GF	GA	GD	Pts	Qualification
1	LA Galaxy	30	18	7	5	44	26	+18	59	Qualification for the conference semifinals
2	Real Salt Lake	30	15	4	11	45	20	+25	56	Qualification for the conference semifinals
3	FC Dallas	30	12	4	14	42	28	+14	50	Qualification for the conference semifinals
4	Seattle Sounders FC	30	14	10	6	39	35	+4	48	Qualification for the conference semifinals
5	Colorado Rapids	30	12	8	10	44	32	+12	46	Qualification for the conference semifinals
6	San Jose Earthquakes	30	13	10	7	34	33	+1	46	Qualification for the conference semifinals
7	Houston Dynamo	30	9	15	6	40	49	−9	33	
8	Chivas USA	30	8	18	4	31	45	−14	28	

Source: MLS

=== Overall standings ===
Pos	Team	Pld	W	L	T	GF	GA	GD	Pts	
1	LA Galaxy (S)	30	18	7	5	44	26	+18	59	Qualification for the CONCACAF Champions League
2	Real Salt Lake	30	15	4	11	45	20	+25	56	
3	New York Red Bulls	30	15	9	6	38	29	+9	51	
4	FC Dallas	30	12	4	14	42	28	+14	50	Qualification for the CONCACAF Champions League
5	Columbus Crew	30	14	8	8	40	34	+6	50	
6	Seattle Sounders FC (U)	30	14	10	6	39	35	+4	48	Qualification for the CONCACAF Champions League
7	Colorado Rapids (C)	30	12	8	10	44	32	+12	46	Qualification for the CONCACAF Champions League
8	San Jose Earthquakes	30	13	10	7	34	33	+1	46	
9	Kansas City Wizards	30	11	13	6	36	35	+1	39	
10	Chicago Fire	30	9	12	9	37	38	−1	36	
11	Toronto FC (V)	30	9	13	8	33	41	−8	35	Qualification for the CONCACAF Champions League
12	Houston Dynamo	30	9	15	6	40	49	−9	33	
13	New England Revolution	30	9	16	5	32	50	−18	32	
14	Philadelphia Union	30	8	15	7	35	49	−14	31	
15	Chivas USA	30	8	18	4	31	45	−14	28	
16	D.C. United	30	6	20	4	21	47	−26	22	

Source: MLS
Rules for classification: 1) points; 2) head-to-head record; 3) goal difference; 4) number of goals scored
(C) MLS Cup champions; (S) Supporters' Shield winners; (U) U.S. Open Cup winners; (V) Canadian Championship winners

== MLS Cup playoffs ==
=== Bracket ===
Conference semifinals
E1	New York Red Bulls	1	1
E4	San Jose Earthquakes	0	3
Eastern Conference
E2	Columbus Crew	0	2 (4)
E3	Colorado Rapids (p)	1	1 (5)
W1	Los Angeles Galaxy	1	2
W4	Seattle Sounders FC	0	1
Western Conference
W2	Real Salt Lake	1	1
W3	FC Dallas	2	1

Conference finals
E4	San Jose Earthquakes	0
E3	Colorado Rapids	1
W1	Los Angeles Galaxy	0
W3	FC Dallas	3

MLS Cup
E3	Colorado Rapids	2
W3	FC Dallas	1

== Player statistics ==
=== Goals ===
Rank	Scorer	Club	Goals
1	(United States) Chris Wondolowski	San Jose Earthquakes	18
2	(United States) Edson Buddle	LA Galaxy	17
3	(Canada) Dwayne De Rosario	Toronto FC	15
4	(Jamaica) Omar Cummings	Colorado Rapids	14
4	(France) Sébastien Le Toux	Philadelphia Union	14
6	(Colombia) Juan Pablo Ángel	New York Red Bulls	13
6	(United States) Conor Casey	Colorado Rapids	13
8	(Costa Rica) Álvaro Saborío	Real Salt Lake	12
9	(United States) Jeff Cunningham	FC Dallas	11
10	(Sierra Leone) Kei Kamara	Kansas City Wizards	10
10	(Colombia) Fredy Montero	Seattle Sounders FC	10
10	(Democratic Republic of the Congo) Steve Zakuani	Seattle Sounders FC	10

=== Assists ===
Rank	Player	Club	Assists
1	(United States) Landon Donovan	LA Galaxy	16
2	(Colombia) David Ferreira	FC Dallas	13
3	(United States) Brad Davis	Houston Dynamo	12
4	(France) Sébastien Le Toux	Philadelphia Union	11
5	(United States) Bobby Convey	San Jose Earthquakes	10
5	(Colombia) Fredy Montero	Seattle Sounders FC	10
5	(Ghana) Patrick Nyarko	Chicago Fire	10
8	(Argentina) Guillermo Barros Schelotto	Columbus Crew	9
8	(Argentina) Javier Morales	Real Salt Lake	9
10	(Scotland) Jamie Smith	Colorado Rapids	8
10	(Jamaica) Ryan Johnson	San Jose Earthquakes	8
10	(United States) Michael Stephens	LA Galaxy	8

=== Clean sheets ===
Rank	Player	Club	Clean sheets
1	(United States) Nick Rimando	Real Salt Lake	14
2	(Senegal) Bouna Coundoul	New York Red Bulls	11
2	(United States) Will Hesmer	Columbus Crew	11
2	(United States) Kasey Keller	Seattle Sounders FC	11
2	(Jamaica) Donovan Ricketts	LA Galaxy	11
6	(Denmark) Jimmy Nielsen	Kansas City Wizards	10
7	(United States) Kevin Hartman	FC Dallas	9
8	(Switzerland) Stefan Frei	Kansas City Wizards	8
9	(United States) Jon Busch	San Jose Earthquakes	7
9	(United States) Matt Pickens	Colorado Rapids	7

== Awards ==
=== Individual awards ===
Award	Player	Club
Most Valuable Player	(Colombia) David Ferreira	FC Dallas
Defender of the Year	(Colombia) Jámison Olave	Real Salt Lake
Goalkeeper of the Year	(Jamaica) Donovan Ricketts	LA Galaxy
Coach of the Year	(United States) Schellas Hyndman	FC Dallas
Rookie of the Year	(Honduras) Andy Najar	D.C. United
Newcomer of the Year	(Costa Rica) Álvaro Saborío	Real Salt Lake
Comeback Player of the Year	(United States) Bobby Convey	San Jose Earthquakes
Golden Boot	(United States) Chris Wondolowski	San Jose Earthquakes
Goal of the Year	(Guatemala) Marco Pappa	Chicago Fire
Save of the Year	(United States) Kasey Keller	Seattle Sounders FC
Fair Play Award	(France) Sébastien Le Toux	Philadelphia Union
Humanitarian of the Year	(United States) Seth Stammler	New York Red Bulls

=== Best XI ===
Goalkeeper	Defenders	Midfielders	Forwards
(Jamaica) Donovan Ricketts, LA Galaxy	(United States) Nat Borchers, Salt Lake (United States) Omar Gonzalez, LA Galaxy (Colombia) Jámison Olave, Salt Lake	(Canada) Dwayne De Rosario, Toronto (United States) Landon Donovan, LA Galaxy (Colombia) David Ferreira, Dallas (France) Sébastien Le Toux, Philadelphia (Argentina) Javier Morales, Salt Lake	(United States) Edson Buddle, LA Galaxy (United States) Chris Wondolowski, San Jose

=== Monthly awards ===
Month	MLS Player of the Month			MLS W.O.R.K.S. Humanitarian of the Month		
Month	Player	Club	Link	Player	Club	Link
April	(United States) Edson Buddle	Los Angeles Galaxy	7G 4–0–1	(The Gambia) Sanna Nyassi	Seattle Sounders FC	April Humanitarian
May	(Costa Rica) Álvaro Saborío	Real Salt Lake	4G 3A 5–0–0	(United States) Chris Tierney	New England Revolution	May Humanitarian
June	(United States) Nick Rimando	Real Salt Lake	0G Allowed 1–0–2	(United States) Craig Waibel	Houston Dynamo	June Humanitarian
July	(Colombia) Fredy Montero	Seattle Sounders FC	2G 3A 3–1–1	(United States) Jed Zayner	Columbus Crew	July Humanitarian
August	(United States) Kevin Hartman	FC Dallas	2G Allowed 2–0–2	(United States) Michael Lahoud	Chivas USA	August Humanitarian
September	(Jamaica) Omar Cummings	Colorado Rapids	6G 1A 3–1–1	(Sierra Leone) Kei Kamara	Kansas City Wizards	September Humanitarian
October	(United States) Chris Wondolowski	San Jose Earthquakes	6G 2–2–1	(United States) James Riley	Seattle Sounders FC	October Humanitarian

=== Weekly awards ===
Week	Player of the Week		AT&T Goal of the Week		NAPA Save of the Week	
Week	Player	Club	Player	Club	Player	Club
Week 1	(Argentina) Javier Morales	Real Salt Lake	(Argentina) Javier Morales	Real Salt Lake	(United States) Nick Rimando	Real Salt Lake
Week 2	(The Gambia) Kenny Mansally	New England Revolution	(The Gambia) Kenny Mansally	New England Revolution	(United States) Preston Burpo	New England Revolution
Week 3	(France) Sébastien Le Toux	Philadelphia Union	(Guatemala) Marco Pappa	Chicago Fire	(United States) Jason Hernandez	San Jose Earthquakes
Week 4	(United States) Edson Buddle	Los Angeles Galaxy	(Jamaica) Lovel Palmer	Houston Dynamo	(United States) Kasey Keller	Seattle Sounders FC
Week 5	(Canada) Dwayne De Rosario	Toronto FC	(Colombia) Fredy Montero	Seattle Sounders FC	(United States) Andrew Dykstra	Chicago Fire
Week 6	(United States) Edson Buddle	Los Angeles Galaxy	(United States) Chris Wondolowski	San Jose Earthquakes	(United States) Joe Cannon	San Jose Earthquakes
Week 7	(United States) Landon Donovan	Los Angeles Galaxy	(United States) Logan Pause	Chicago Fire	(United States) Kevin Hartman	FC Dallas
Week 8	(Costa Rica) Alvaro Saborio	Real Salt Lake	(Democratic Republic of the Congo) Danny Mwanga	Philadelphia Union	(Argentina) Gino Padula	Columbus Crew
Week 9	(Venezuela) Emilio Rentería	Columbus Crew	(Ghana) Dominic Oduro	Houston Dynamo	(Denmark) Jimmy Nielsen	Kansas City Wizards
Week 10	(Canada) Dwayne De Rosario	Toronto FC	(United States) Shea Salinas	Philadelphia Union	(Jamaica) Donovan Ricketts	Los Angeles Galaxy
Week 11	(United States) Brek Shea	FC Dallas	(Costa Rica) Leo González	Seattle Sounders FC	(United States) Chris Seitz	Philadelphia Union
Week 12	(United States) Chris Pontius	D.C. United	(Sierra Leone) Kei Kamara	Kansas City Wizards	(United States) Nick Rimando	Real Salt Lake
Week 13	(Colombia) Juan Pablo Ángel	New York Red Bulls	(Colombia) Juan Pablo Ángel	New York Red Bulls	(Denmark) Jimmy Nielsen	Kansas City Wizards
Week 14	(Costa Rica) Álvaro Saborío	Real Salt Lake	(Brazil) Juninho	Los Angeles Galaxy	(Denmark) Jimmy Nielsen	Kansas City Wizards
Week 15	(United States) Justin Braun	Chivas USA	(Colombia) David Ferreira	FC Dallas	(Switzerland) Stefan Frei	Toronto FC
Week 16	(France) Sébastien Le Toux	Philadelphia Union	(United States) Roger Levesque	Seattle Sounders FC	(Denmark) Jimmy Nielsen	Kansas City Wizards
Week 17	(Democratic Republic of the Congo) Steve Zakuani	Seattle Sounders FC	(United States) Ned Grabavoy	Real Salt Lake	(United States) Kasey Keller	Seattle Sounders FC
Week 18	(Colombia) Juan Pablo Ángel	New York Red Bulls	(France) Sébastien Le Toux	Philadelphia Union	(United States) Sean Johnson	Chicago Fire
Week 19	(United States) Jeff Cunningham	FC Dallas	(Colombia) Fredy Montero	Seattle Sounders FC	(United States) Sean Johnson	Chicago Fire
Week 20	(Argentina) Javier Morales	Real Salt Lake	(Argentina) Javier Morales	Real Salt Lake	(United States) Nick Rimando	Real Salt Lake
Week 21	(United States) Brian Ching	Houston Dynamo	(Mexico) Rafael Márquez	New York Red Bulls	(United States) Sean Johnson	Chicago Fire
Week 22	(Colombia) Fredy Montero	Seattle Sounders FC	(Jamaica) Dane Richards	New York Red Bulls	(Denmark) Jimmy Nielsen	Kansas City Wizards
Week 23	(Jamaica) Omar Cummings	Colorado Rapids	(Brazil) Geovanni	San Jose Earthquakes	(United States) Kasey Keller	Seattle Sounders FC
Week 24	(United States) Alan Gordon	Chivas USA	(Jamaica) Omar Cummings	Colorado Rapids	(United States) Kasey Keller	Seattle Sounders FC
Week 25	(Switzerland) Blaise Nkufo	Seattle Sounders FC	(Switzerland) Blaise Nkufo	Seattle Sounders FC	(United States) Kasey Keller	Seattle Sounders FC
Week 26	(United States) Chris Wondolowski	San Jose Earthquakes	(United States) Nat Borchers	Real Salt Lake	(United States) Kasey Keller	Seattle Sounders FC
Week 27	(Senegal) Bouna Coundoul	New York Red Bulls	(Democratic Republic of the Congo) Steve Zakuani	Seattle Sounders FC	(Senegal) Bouna Coundoul	New York Red Bulls
Week 28	(United States) Chris Wondolowski	San Jose Earthquakes	(Uruguay) Álvaro Fernández	Seattle Sounders FC	(United States) Brad Knighton	Philadelphia Union
Week 29	(Democratic Republic of the Congo) Steve Zakuani	Seattle Sounders FC	(Democratic Republic of the Congo) Steve Zakuani	Seattle Sounders FC	(Brazil) Fred	Philadelphia Union
Week 30	(United States) Chris Wondolowski	San Jose Earthquakes	(United States) James Riley	Seattle Sounders FC	(United States) Eddie Gaven	Columbus Crew

== Related competitions ==
=== International competitions ===
==== CONCACAF Champions League ====
The Columbus Crew continued their 2009–10 CONCACAF Champions League campaign that began during the previous season. They were defeated by Mexican club Toluca in the quarterfinals, 5–4 on aggregate.

Seattle Sounders FC became the first team to qualify for the 2010–11 CONCACAF Champions League by winning the 2009 Lamar Hunt U.S. Open Cup. The Columbus Crew qualified next by winning the 2009 MLS Supporters' Shield. The Los Angeles Galaxy and Real Salt Lake also qualified by being the two 2009 MLS Cup finalists, while Toronto FC took the Canadian berth by virtue of their Canadian Championship win. Los Angeles, Seattle, and Toronto entered the competition in the preliminary round, while RSL and Columbus were seeded directly into the group stage.

Seattle and Toronto won their preliminary round ties, beating Isidro Metapán of El Salvador and Motagua of Honduras, respectively. Los Angeles crashed out of the preliminary round after losing their home match 4–1 to the Puerto Rico Islanders of the USSF D-2 Pro League and failing to make up the deficit in the away leg.

The group stage was held August 17 – Oct 21. Real Salt Lake won Group A with 13 points over Cruz Azul, Toronto, and Arabe Unido of Panama. Toronto finished in 3rd place with 8 points. Columbus finished 2nd in Group B behind Club Santos Laguna but ahead of C.S.D. Municipal of Guatemala and Joe Public F.C. of Trinidad. Seattle finished 4th in Group C with 3 points behind C.F. Monterrey, C.D. Saprissa of Costa Rica, and C.D. Marathón of Honduras.

On November 1, the draw for the Championship round was held. Real Salt Lake will face Columbus in the quarterfinal in February/March 2011, immediately prior to the 2011 MLS Regular Season.

==== SuperLiga ====
As was the case for the 2009 SuperLiga, the top four overall finishers in MLS in 2009 that hadn't already qualified for the Champions League qualified for SuperLiga. This year's competition was contested by the Houston Dynamo, the Chicago Fire, Chivas USA, and the New England Revolution from MLS. The four Mexican teams were Pachuca, Morelia, Puebla, and UNAM.

New England, Houston, Morelia and Puebla advanced from their groups, with the Revolution beating Puebla on penalties in one semifinal, and Morelia defeating Houston in the other. Morelia defeated New England 2–1 in the final at Gillette Stadium on September 1.

=== Domestic competitions ===
==== Lamar Hunt U.S. Open Cup ====
The top six overall teams from the 2009 MLS season (Columbus, Los Angeles, Houston, Seattle, Chicago, and Chivas USA) received automatic berths into the third round of the 2010 U.S. Open Cup, while the eight remaining U.S.-based MLS teams and the expansion Philadelphia Union competed in a single-elimination qualification tournament to determine the MLS's final two official entrants into the competition. Teams were seeded one through nine, with the seventh-place MLS team from 2009 earning the first seed (and would play the winner of the eight v. nine play-in game), while each following team would receive its respective seed. The New York Red Bulls and D.C. United earned the final two MLS spots in the third round.

For the first time since 2006, the semifinals were contested exclusively by MLS teams, with Seattle beating Chivas USA and Columbus defeating D.C. United. The final was played October 5 at Qwest Field in Seattle with the defending cup holders, the Sounders, defeating the Crew 2–1. The Sounders became the first MLS team ever to successfully defend the U.S. Open Cup, and the first team from any league to do so since New York Pancyprian-Freedoms in 1983.

==== Canadian championship ====
Toronto FC, as a Canadian-based MLS team, is not eligible to compete in the Lamar Hunt U.S. Open Cup, and instead contested the Canadian Championship with the two Canadian-based teams in the Division-2 Pro League, Vancouver Whitecaps and Montreal Impact. Toronto FC won the tournament, claiming the Voyageurs Cup and Canada's entry into the preliminary round of the 2010–11 CONCACAF Champions League.
