= Bouna Coundoul =

Senegalese footballer (born 1982)

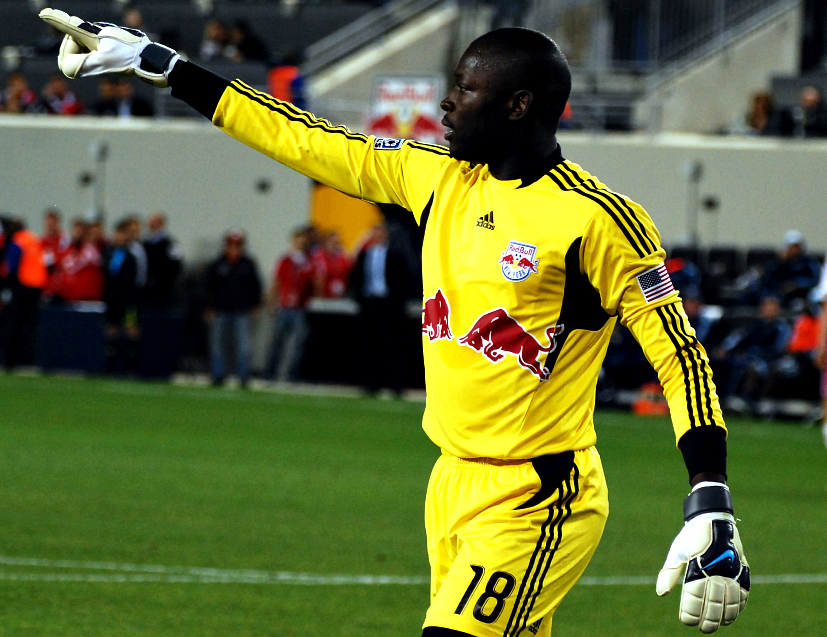
- Coundoul in 2011

Personal information
- Date of birth: March 4, 1982 (age 44)
- Place of birth: Dakar, Senegal
- Height: 6 ft 2 in (1.88 m)
- Position: Goalkeeper

College career
Years	Team	Apps	(Gls)
2002–2004	Albany Great Danes		

Senior career*
Years	Team	Apps	(Gls)
2005–2008	Colorado Rapids	52	(0)
2009–2011	New York Red Bulls	49	(0)
2012	VPS	19	(0)
2012–2013	Enosis Neon Paralimni	5	(0)
2013–2015	Ethnikos Achna	46	(0)
2015–2016	Platinum Stars	7	(0)
Total		178	(0)

International career
2007–2016	Senegal	29	(0)

Managerial career
- 2021–2022: New Amsterdam FC
- * Club domestic league appearances and goals

Bouna Coundoul (born March 4, 1982) is a Senegalese former professional footballer who coached New Amsterdam FC in the National Independent Soccer Association. Coundoul played as a goalkeeper. Between 2007 and 2016 he played for the Senegal national team.

== Youth and college ==
Born in Dakar, Senegal, Coundoul moved to New York City with his family as a child. He was a standout goalkeeper at Martin Luther King Jr. High School in Manhattan, where he received the All-New York City Goalkeeper of the Year award. Coundoul attended and played for the University at Albany, SUNY.

== Club career ==
=== Colorado Rapids ===
In 2005, Coundoul signed with Colorado Rapids, and made his MLS debut on May 13, 2006, as a substitute for injured starter Joe Cannon in the 10th minute. He then earned his first professional start and shutout the next game, in a 1–0 victory over Los Angeles Galaxy on May 20.

In the first game of the 2007 MLS season, at which he arrived wearing traditional Senegalese garb, he contributed to the 2–1 victory over D.C. United with a diving stop in the last minute. In an interview that year, he created his trademark phrase, "Bouna Time!" which grew and spread as a chant in the supporters' sections as well as being promoted by the team.

In January 2009, Coundoul failed to agree terms on a new contract with the Rapids and was released. Coundoul appeared in 52 league matches during his career with Colorado, posting 16 shutouts and a 1.16 goals against average.

=== New York Red Bulls ===
On June 29, 2009, New York Red Bulls of Major League Soccer signed Coundoul after acquiring his rights from Colorado in exchange for allocation money. He made his debut for the Red Bulls on July 25, in an away match against his former club Colorado. By the end of the season, Coundoul established himself as New York's first choice keeper and ended the 2009 campaign appearing in 9 league matches posting 2 shutouts and a 1.25 goals against average.

On March 20, 2010, Coundoul started for Red Bulls in a 3–1 victory against Santos FC, which was the first match played at the new Red Bull Arena. On October 2, 2010, Coundoul made a career-high 12 saves in the Red Bulls’ 1–0 victory over the Kansas City Wizards, which clinched a playoff berth for New York and propelled it to first place in the Eastern Conference. The shutout was Coundoul's 10th of the season, setting a new franchise season record and resulted in Coundoul being named MLS Player of the Week for Week 27. On October 21, 2010, Coundoul recorded his 11th clean sheet of the season in helping Red Bull to a 2–0 victory over New England Revolution which helped the club clinch the regular season Eastern Conference title. Coundoul ended the 2010 campaign appearing in 27 matches, and registering a career-best 1.04 goals against average. He became second choice following the arrival of Frank Rost.

On November 30, 2011, the Red Bulls declined the 2012 option on Coundoul's contract, making him eligible for the 2011 MLS Re-Entry Draft. Coundoul was not selected in the draft and became a free agent.

=== Europe ===
Coundoul joined Championship club Doncaster Rovers on a trial in February 2012, but did not sign a contract there. After a one-week trial with Vaasan Palloseura in the Finnish Veikkausliiga, on March 16, 2012, he signed a short-term deal until July 2012.

Coundoul signed for Enosis Neon Paralimni of Cyprus on August 18, 2012, and July 2013, he signed a two-year contract with Ethnikos Achna of Cyprus.

=== South Africa ===
In February 2015 Coundoul signed with South African side Platinum Stars F.C. He signed a three-year extension with the club in June 2015 but retired in summer 2016.

== International career ==
For his performances during the 2007 MLS season, Coundoul was awarded a call-up to the Senegal national football team. On November 23, 2007, he was named to the Senegalese roster for the African Cup of Nations. He was capped in their final game against South Africa after regular goalkeeper Tony Sylva broke curfew and was suspended from the team. The game ended in a 1–1 draw, with Coundoul making several strong saves. After years of being a fringe player for the national team, Coundoul was named to Senegal's squad for the 2012 African Cup of Nations. Coundoul was first-choice goalkeeper for the first two matches of the group stage against Zambia and Equatorial Guinea which both ended in upset defeats for Senegal. For the third and final match of the group stage, Amara Traoré chose Khadim N'Diaye to start in goal over Coundoul. With that defeat, Senegal was knocked out of the tournament.

== Career statistics ==
Appearances and goals by club, season and competition
Club	Season	League		
Club	Season	Division	Apps	Goals
Colorado Rapids	2006	MLS	5	0
Colorado Rapids	2007	MLS	30	0
Colorado Rapids	2008	MLS	17	0
Colorado Rapids	Total		52	0
New York Red Bulls	2009	MLS	8	0
New York Red Bulls	2010	MLS	29	0
New York Red Bulls	2011	MLS	12	0
New York Red Bulls	Total		49	0
VPS	2012	Veikkausliiga	19	0
Enosis Neon Paralimni	2012–13	Cypriot First Division	5	0
Ethnikos Achna	2013–14	Cypriot First Division	32	0
Ethnikos Achna	2014–15	Cypriot First Division	14	0
Ethnikos Achna	Total		46	0
Platinum Stars	2015–16	South African Premier Division	7	0
Career total			178	0
