= International Evangelism Center - African Interior Mission =

Christian denomination and megachurch

- Centre international d’évangélisation - Mission intérieure africaine
- Classification: Evangelicalism
- Theology: Charismatic
- Region: World
- Headquarters: Ouagadougou, Burkina Faso
- Founder: Mamadou Karambiri
- Origin: 1987 (38 years ago)
- Official website: cie-mia.org

International Evangelism Center - African Interior Mission (French: Centre international d’évangélisation - Mission intérieure africaine) (CIE-MIA) is an international Evangelical charismatic Christian association of churches and a megachurch. The headquarters is located in Ouagadougou, Burkina Faso. Its leader is Mamadou Karambiri.

== History ==
In 1985, Mamadou Karambiri, general manager in a company, started a prayer group with his family which reached 500 people in 1987. The church was founded in 1987 in Ouagadougou.

In the 1990s, nearly 60 churches were planted in Ouagadougou and in different cities of the country. Churches have also been established in other cities abroad.

On November 2, 1998, the Bible training center, Le Chandelier, located near the CIE premises in Ouagadougou opened its doors. In 2010, the church founded Impact TV. The CIE had 6000 members in 2010.

In 2020, a 12,000-seat temple, the Church of the Nations/Bethel Israel Tabernacle, was inaugurated in Ouagadougou and the association had 600 churches worldwide.

== Beliefs ==
The association has a charismatic confession of faith.
