= David Kramer (soccer) =

American soccer player and coach

Personal information
- Date of birth: August 1, 1972 (age 54)
- Place of birth: Cupertino, California, U.S.
- Height: 6 ft 3 in (1.91 m)
- Position: Goalkeeper

Youth career
- 1991–1994: Fresno State

Senior career*
Years	Team	Apps	(Gls)
1995	Monterey Bay Jaguars		
1996–1997	Los Angeles Galaxy	27	(0)
1997	Colorado Foxes	6	(0)
1997–1999	San Jose Clash	44	(0)
2000–2002	Colorado Rapids	46	(0)

Managerial career
- 2008–2012: Colorado Rapids (goalkeeper coach)
- * Club domestic league appearances and goals

David Kramer (born August 1, 1972) is an American retired soccer goalkeeper who played professionally in the USISL and Major League Soccer. He is currently Director of Soccer and Business Development for Real Colorado Edge Soccer Club. He was the 1994 ISAA Goalkeeper of the Year.

== Youth ==
Kramer grew up in Mountain View, California and attended Fresno State where he played on the men's soccer team. In 1994, Kramer earned first team All American recognition and was honored as the ISAA Goalkeeper of the Year.

== Professional ==
After graduating from college, Kramer signed with the Monterey Bay Jaguars of USISL. In 1995, his rookie season, he was named the All Western Division goalkeeper of the year. That season, the Jaguars went to the USISL semi-finals before falling 4–3 in overtime to the Minnesota Thunder.

In February 1996, the Los Angeles Galaxy of Major League Soccer (MLS) drafted Kramer in the second round (14th overall) of the first MLS draft. He was the Galaxy's starting goalkeeper as the team ran to MLS Cup 1996 where they fell to D.C. United. Kramer's second year with the team did not go as well as his first. On June 2, 1997, the Galaxy waived Kramer after only nine games with the team sitting at 3–6. He finished the season with the Colorado Foxes.

The San Jose Clash then signed Kramer and he played 12 games of the 1997 season with them. He remained the team's starting goalie for most of the 1998 season (with backup goalie Andy Kirk starting a few games that year), but suffered a shoulder injury only eight games into the 1999 season. Backup goalie Joe Cannon took the job and kept it even after Kramer's shoulder healed. The Clash then traded Kramer to the Colorado Rapids at the end of the season. Kramer remained with the Rapids through the end of 2002, but was replaced, once again, by Joe Cannon when Cannon moved to the Rapids.

== Coach ==
In 2005 Kramer served as the goalkeeper coach at the Real Colorado youth club. In June 2008, Kramer was named goalkeeper coach of his former team, the Colorado Rapids. Kramer served as the goalkeeper coach until August 2012 when he left to join Real Colorado Edge Soccer Club, where he is currently Director of Soccer and Business Development.
