= Kevin Hartman =

American soccer player (born 1974)

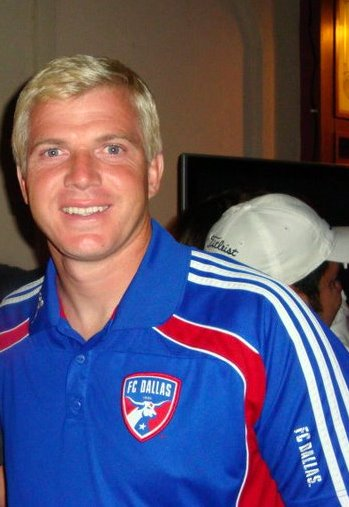
- Hartman with FC Dallas in 2011

Personal information
- Full name: Kevin Eugene Hartman
- Date of birth: May 25, 1974 (age 52)
- Place of birth: Athens, Ohio, United States
- Height: 6 ft 1 in (1.85 m)
- Position: Goalkeeper

Team information
- Current team: LA Galaxy (goalkeeper coach)

College career
Years	Team	Apps	(Gls)
1992–1993	Cal State Dominguez Hills		
1994–1996	UCLA Bruins		

Senior career*
Years	Team	Apps	(Gls)
1997–2006	Los Angeles Galaxy	243	(0)
2007–2009	Kansas City Wizards	90	(0)
2010–2012	FC Dallas	83	(0)
2013	New York Red Bulls	0	(0)
Total		416	(0)

International career
1999–2006	United States	5	(0)

Managerial career
- 2020–2021: LA Galaxy (academy director)
- 2021–: LA Galaxy (goalkeeping)
- * Club domestic league appearances and goals

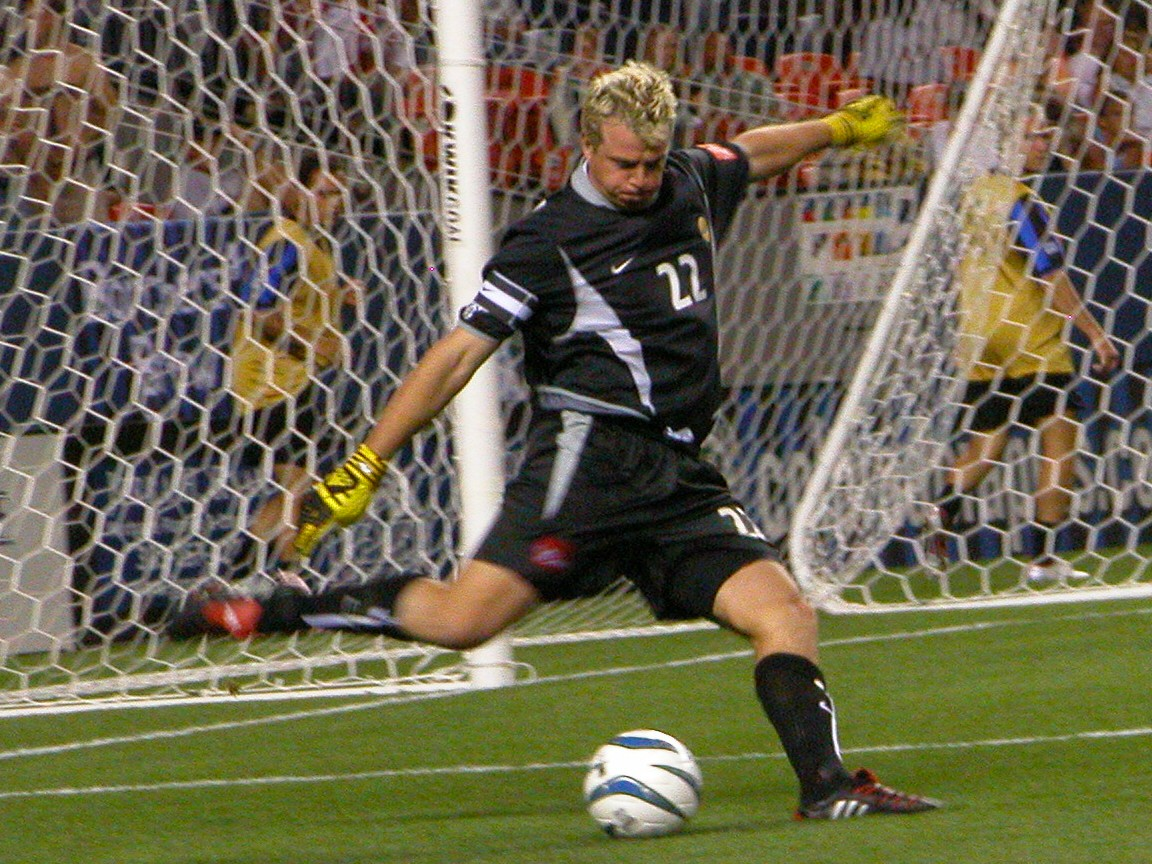

Kevin Eugene Hartman (born May 25, 1974) is an American former soccer player who played 17 seasons in Major League Soccer, being on the field for a record 37,260 minutes. Nicknamed El Gato (Spanish for "the cat") because of his agility, reflexes, physical qualities, and shot-stopping ability, Hartman has more saves than any other goalkeeper in MLS history, and was the MLS Goalkeeper of the Year in 1999. Considered to be one of the greatest and most successful goalkeepers in MLS history, he was also known for his longevity.

== Career ==
=== Youth and college ===
Hartman attended Radford High School in Radford, Virginia, where he made the school's varsity team and served as backup goalkeeper in 1989. As a sophomore, he started for a young Radford High Team that went 1–12, where Hartman once gave up six goals in a half. That Radford High team won the Region IV Title in 1992 over Blacksburg High School and lost in the state semi-finals. RHS would have likely contended for the state title in 1992; however, between his sophomore and junior year at Radford High School, Hartman moved with his family to the Palos Verdes in California, where he enrolled in Palos Verdes High School, playing on the junior varsity squad for the 1990–1991 season. Before his senior year, Palos Verdes High School merged with Rolling Hills High School and Miraleste High School to form Palos Verdes Peninsula High School. As a senior, Hartman played on the Peninsula High School varsity squad, though he only started a few of the games early in the season. Hartman also played on a club team known as the San Pedro FC Santos, headed by Pat Nave of San Pedro, California.

Known as having a strong work ethic, Hartman often woke up early in the morning to practice in the nearby city of Long Beach. After graduating from high school in the Spring of 1992, Hartman went on to play college soccer at California State University, Dominguez Hills and UCLA. He began his college career at Dominguez Hills, playing there in 1992 and 1993, before transferring to UCLA, where he played in 1995 and 1996, redshirting in 1994.

=== Professional ===
==== LA Galaxy ====
Hartman was drafted 29th overall in the third round of the 1997 MLS College Draft by Los Angeles Galaxy. He played very little his rookie year, as he was stuck behind renowned Mexican keeper Jorge Campos. After the season, Hartman, or "El Gato" (dubbed by La Opinión reporter Ramiro Gonzalez), was selected third overall by Chicago Fire in the expansion draft; the Galaxy quickly reacquired him, however, trading Campos and Chris Armas to the Fire in exchange for Hartman and Danny Pena. With Campos in Chicago, Hartman seized the starting job, starting 28 games for the team kept it until his departure from the team, except for a brief period in 2001 when Matt Reis briefly took his job. He was named MLS Goalkeeper of the Year in 1999 following an especially good season. Hartman helped the Galaxy win the CONCACAF Champions' Cup in 2000, the U.S. Open Cup in 2001 and 2005, and the MLS Cup in 2002 and 2005.

==== Other MLS teams ====
After ten years with the Galaxy, Hartman was traded to Kansas City Wizards following the 2006 season.

On March 28, 2009, Hartman broke the all-time MLS saves record of 1,136 stops previously held by Tony Meola during a Wizards game against Colorado Rapids.

Kevin left Kansas City when he failed to agree to a new contract extension with the club. Hartman's rights were traded to FC Dallas in return for a conditional second round 2012 MLS SuperDraft pick.

On September 16, 2010, in a match against New York Red Bulls, Kevin was injured by Red Bulls striker Thierry Henry, who wanted to kick the ball to celebrate a goal. Henry kicked the ball and the follow through kicked Hartman's foot, causing him an injury.

Hartman was named to the MLS Team of Week 8 and 9 in the 2011 MLS season for his consecutive clean sheets against D.C. United, Philadelphia Union, and Toronto FC.

On June 4, 2011, Hartman became the first goalkeeper in MLS history to record 100 shutouts.

On July 4, 2012, Hartman played his 400th match in MLS.

Following the 2012 MLS season, Hartman's contract was not renewed by FC Dallas. Hartman entered the 2012 MLS Re-Entry Draft, and became a free agent after going undrafted in both rounds of the draft.

On March 21, 2013, Hartman joined the New York Red Bulls as a free agent saying "to play and also have the opportunity to get into a little bit more of the coaching side of things." Hartman announced his retirement from professional soccer on November 21, 2013.

=== International ===
Despite his success in MLS, Hartman saw little time with the United States national team, making only six international appearances. He received his first cap September 8, 1999 in a match against Jamaica, while his last international appearance came on February 10, 2006, in a friendly against Japan.

== MLS records ==
- 2nd Most victories of any goalkeeper in MLS history with 180.
- Eleventh in MLS in career Goals Against Average (GAA) with a 1.20 (as of 2012-09-11), and career leader in saves (1,453).
- First MLS goalkeeper to have consecutive 20-win seasons.
- First MLS goalkeeper to have consecutive seasons with a GAA less than 1.0.
- Owns the Galaxy record for saves in a game with 12 (set August 20, 2003, vs. Chicago).
- Most saves in MLS history.

== Honors ==
=== Club ===
Los Angeles Galaxy

- CONCACAF Champions' Cup (1): 2000
- U.S. Open Cup (2): 2001, 2005
- MLS Cup (2): 2002, 2005
- Major League Soccer Supporters' Shield (2): 1998, 2002
- Major League Soccer Western Conference Championship (3): 1999, 2002, 2005

FC Dallas

- Major League Soccer Western Conference Championship (1): 2010

New York Red Bulls

- Major League Soccer Supporters' Shield (1): 2013

=== Individual ===
- MLS Goalkeeper of the Year: 1999
- MLS Best XI: 1999
- MLS 400 Games Club
