= Di Department =

Di
- Department
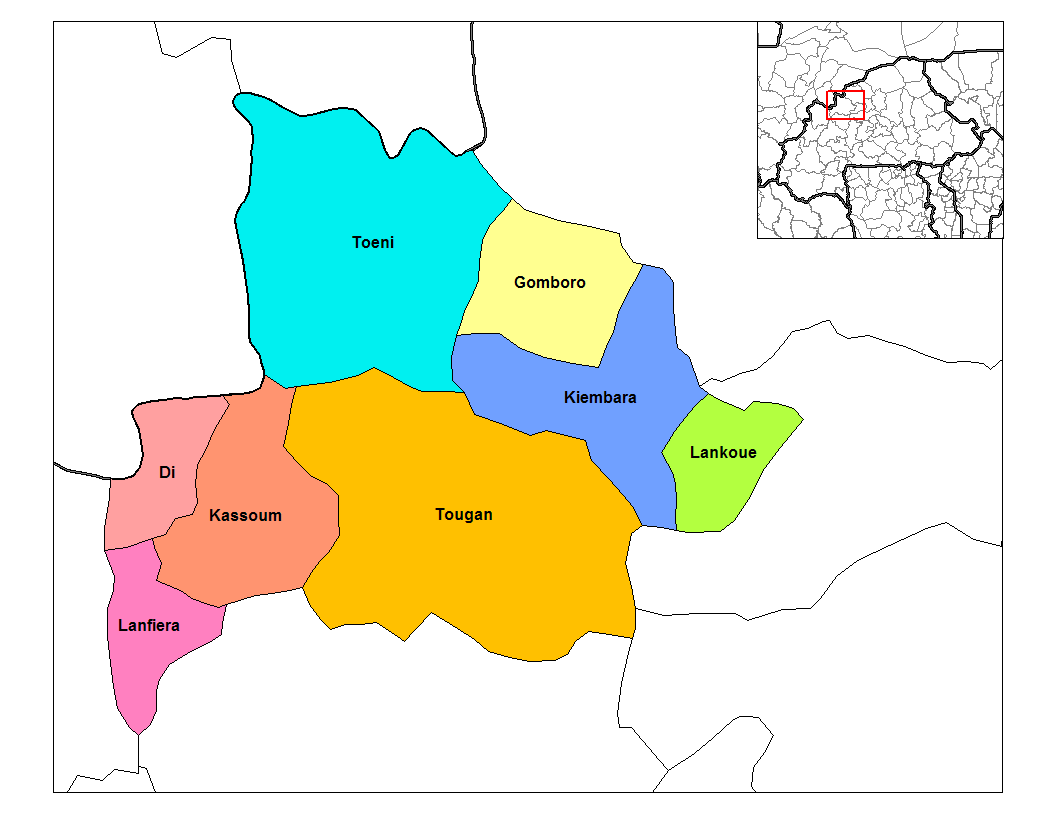
- Di Department location in the province
- Coordinates: 13°10′N 3°25′W
- Country: Burkina Faso
- Province: Sourou Province

Area
  - Total: 306.9 km^{2} (118.5 sq mi)

Population (2019 census)
  - Total: 38,087
  - Density: 124.1/km^{2} (321.4/sq mi)
- Time zone: UTC+0 (GMT 0)

Di is a department or commune of Sourou Province in north-western Burkina Faso. Its capital lies at the town of Di.

== Towns and villages ==
- Di (5 795 inhabitants)
- Benkadi (959 inhabitants)
- Bossé (1 227 inhabitants)
- Bouna (839 inhabitants)
- Débé (3 230 inhabitants)
- Donon (567 inhabitants)
- Koromé (172 inhabitants)
- Lo (224 inhabitants)
- Niassan (3 830 inhabitants)
- Niassari (194 inhabitants)
- Oué (2 141 inhabitants)
- Poro (1 214 inhabitants)
- Poura (879 inhabitants)
- Toma-Ilé (589 inhabitants)
- Toma-koura (298 inhabitants)
- Tourou (279 inhabitants)
- Touroukoro (286 inhabitants)
