= Kassoum =

Kassoum is a given name. Notable people with the name include:

- Kassoum Denon, Malian politician
- Kassoum Ouédraogo (born 1966), Burkinabé footballer
