= Joe Cannon (soccer) =

American soccer player

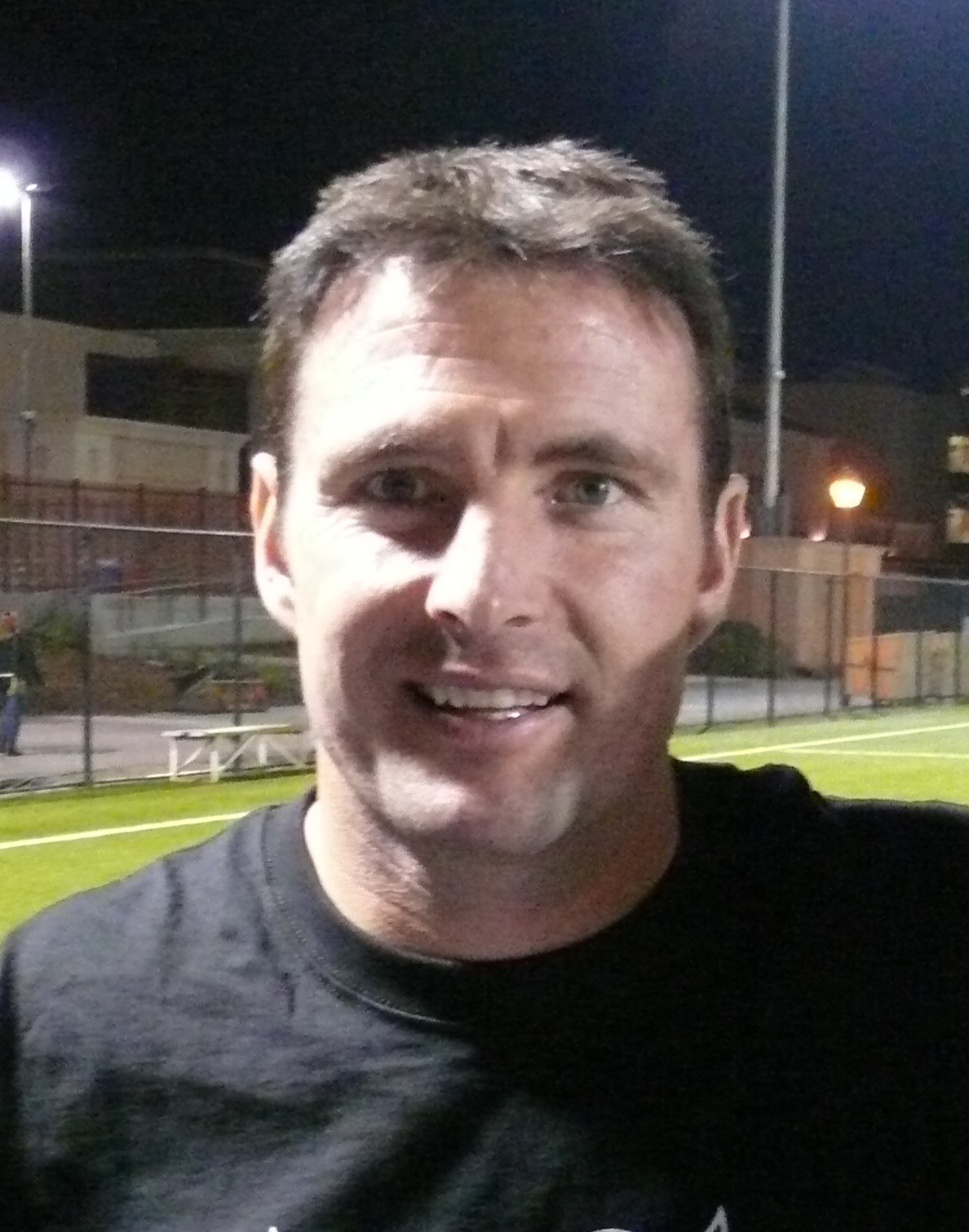
- Cannon in October 2008

Personal information
- Full name: Joseph Cannon
- Date of birth: January 1, 1975 (age 51)
- Place of birth: Sun Valley, Idaho, U.S.
- Height: 6 ft 2 in (1.88 m)
- Position: Goalkeeper

Youth career
- Saint Francis High School

College career
Years	Team	Apps	(Gls)
1993	UC Santa Barbara Gauchos	11	(0)
1995–1997	Santa Clara Broncos		

Senior career*
Years	Team	Apps	(Gls)
1998	San Diego Flash	28	(0)
1999–2002	San Jose Earthquakes	101	(0)
2003	RC Lens	0	(0)
2003–2006	Colorado Rapids	86	(0)
2007	LA Galaxy	29	(0)
2008–2010	San Jose Earthquakes	70	(0)
2011–2013	Vancouver Whitecaps FC	56	(0)
Total		370	(0)

International career
2003–2005	United States	2	(0)

Managerial career
- 2017: Burlingame Dragons FC
- * Club domestic league appearances and goals

Joseph Cannon (born January 1, 1975) is an American former professional soccer player. He spent the majority of his 16 professional seasons playing in Major League Soccer. His 86 MLS career shutouts rank him fourth in league history. He won the MLS Goalkeeper of the Year Award twice (2002, 2004), and finished runner-up for the award three times (2000, 2001, 2005).

He also earned two caps in friendlies with the United States men's national soccer team.

== Early life and education ==
Cannon was born January 1, 1975, in Sun Valley, Idaho, to Barbara and Joe Cannon. As a child, he was raised in both Sun Valley, Idaho and Los Altos Hills, California. He attended Hemingway Elementary School in Ketchum, Idaho, before moving permanently to California at age 12. In California, he played high school soccer for Saint Francis High School.

Cannon attended college at the University of California, Santa Barbara for his first year and was a student-athlete on the UC Santa Barbara Gauchos men's soccer team. He played 11 games for the Gauchos in 1993 and recorded 3 shutouts. He later transferred to Santa Clara University where he played for the Broncos from 1995 to 1997. He graduated with a degree in political science.

== Playing career ==
=== San Diego Flash and San Jose Earthquakes ===
Cannon was not drafted by a Major League Soccer team and instead signed with the San Diego Flash of the A-League in 1998. He appeared in 28 games, posting 11 shutouts, en route to being named the Flash's Most Valuable Player.

After a season with the Flash, he was signed by Major League Soccer team San Jose Earthquakes. After starting goalkeeper David Kramer tore the labrum in his shoulder, Cannon was promoted to the first team for the Quakes. He remained as the starter until 2002, leading San Jose to victory in MLS Cup 2001 and winning his first MLS Goalkeeper of the Year Award in 2002.

=== French foray and return to MLS ===
Cannon's Major League Soccer contract expired following the 2002 season and he attempted to play for a European team. After an unsuccessful trial with Feyenoord, he signed a six-month contract with RC Lens of France's Ligue 1. He was behind Charles Itandje in the Lens side and was not able to break into the first team.

Meanwhile, in MLS, the Earthquakes traded the rights to Cannon to the Colorado Rapids for three draft picks—a first-round 2004 pick, and third and fourth-round 2005 picks—and Cannon returned to play in America.

I don't care whether they bring in Joe Cannon or Jeff Bazooka or Jim Tommygun ... I don't need anyone to push me.

— Scott Garlick,

I don't care if it's Scott Garlick, Scott Salt or Scott Pepper. I'm very confident in my abilities. I can compete for the job anywhere, and may the best man win.

— Joe Cannon,

Cannon was initially behind incumbent goalkeeper Scott Garlick, but Rapids coach Tim Hankinson controversially promoted Cannon into the starting role for the 2003 playoffs. Although Colorado did not advance, Garlick was traded to the Dallas Burn and Cannon kept his starting position. The following season in 2004, Cannon won his second MLS Goalkeeper of the Year Award in addition to being named to the MLS Best XI and as a finalist for the MLS Most Valuable Player Award.

In December 2006, Cannon was traded to the Los Angeles Galaxy for Herculez Gomez and Ugo Ihemelu. He made his Galaxy debut on April 8, 2007, in a 0–0 tie with the Houston Dynamo. He spent one season with the club.

=== Later career ===
Cannon returned to the Earthquakes via trade with the Galaxy for allocation money in January 2008. He spent three seasons with the club.

Cannon was selected by Vancouver Whitecaps FC in the 2010 MLS Expansion Draft. He re-signed with Vancouver for the 2012 Major League Soccer season. Cannon retired following the 2013 Major League Soccer season.

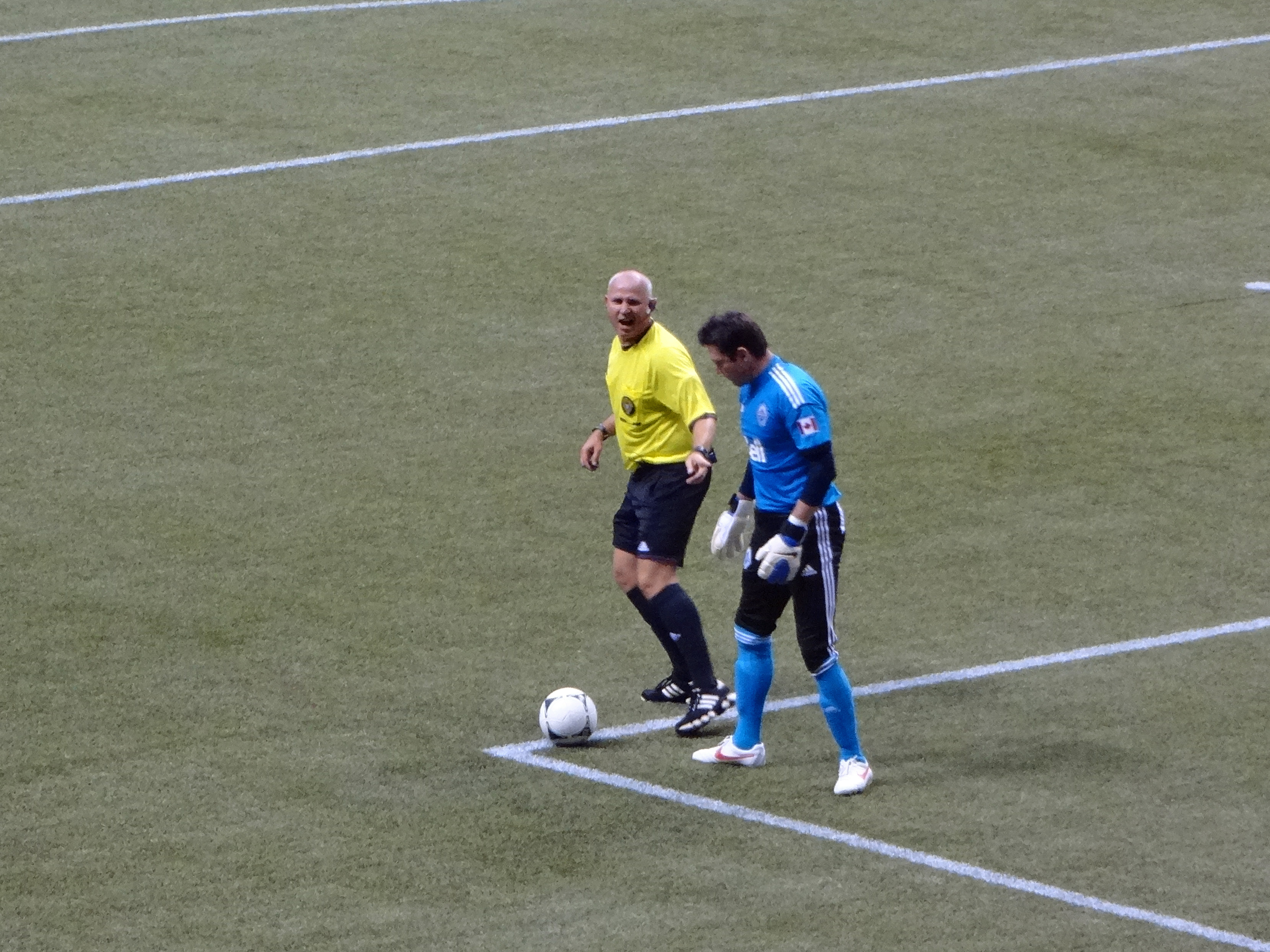
Cannon with Vancouver Whitecaps FC

=== International career ===
Cannon earned two caps with the United States men's national soccer team. His first cap came against New Zealand in 2003 where he played the first half of a 2–1 win. In 2004 he was called into several U.S. camps without gaining any game time. In 2005 he won his second cap, playing the first half of a friendly against Honduras.

Cannon's grandfather and father are Canadian, which made him eligible for the Canada men's national soccer team.

== Post-playing career ==
In March 2014, Cannon was announced as a color commentator for San Jose Earthquakes radio broadcasts on KLIV.

== Personal life ==
Cannon has a twin brother, Jon, who was a minor-league baseball pitcher. He has two other brothers, Cody and Colt. His father, Joe Cannon Sr., was a country-western singer.

== Career statistics ==
Club	Season	League			Cup		Other		Total	
Club	Season	League	Apps	Goals	Apps	Goals	Apps	Goals	Apps	Goals
Colorado Rapids	2003	MLS	2	0	0	0	0	0	2	0
Colorado Rapids	2004	MLS	32	0	0	0	0	0	32	0
Colorado Rapids	2005	MLS	30	0	0	0	0	0	30	0
Colorado Rapids	2006	MLS	30	0	0	0	0	0	30	0
Colorado Rapids	Total		94	0	0	0	0	0	94	0
LA Galaxy	2007	MLS	34	0	0	0	0	0	34	0
LA Galaxy	Total		34	0	0	0	0	0	34	0
San Jose Earthquakes	2008	MLS	30	0	0	0	0	0	30	0
San Jose Earthquakes	2009	MLS	28	0	0	0	0	0	28	0
San Jose Earthquakes	2010	MLS	12	0	0	0	0	0	12	0
San Jose Earthquakes	Total		70	0	0	0	0	0	70	0
Vancouver Whitecaps	2011	MLS	20	0	0	0	0	0	20	0
Vancouver Whitecaps	2012	MLS	26	0	0	0	0	0	26	0
Vancouver Whitecaps	2013	MLS	10	0	0	0	0	0	10	0
Vancouver Whitecaps	Total		56	0	0	0	0	0	56	0
Career total			254	0	0	0	0	0	254	0

== Awards and honors ==
=== Club ===
San Jose Earthquakes

- MLS Cup: 2001

=== Individual ===
- MLS Goalkeeper of the Year: 2002, 2004
- MLS Best XI: 2004
