= Kassoum Denon =

Malian politician

Kassoum Denon is a Malian politician. He serves as the Malian Minister of Agriculture.
