= Tougan =

- Location within Burkina Faso, West Africa
- Coordinates: 13°04′N 3°04′W
- Country: Burkina Faso

Population (2019 census)
  - Total: 26,347
- Time zone: UTC+0 (GMT)
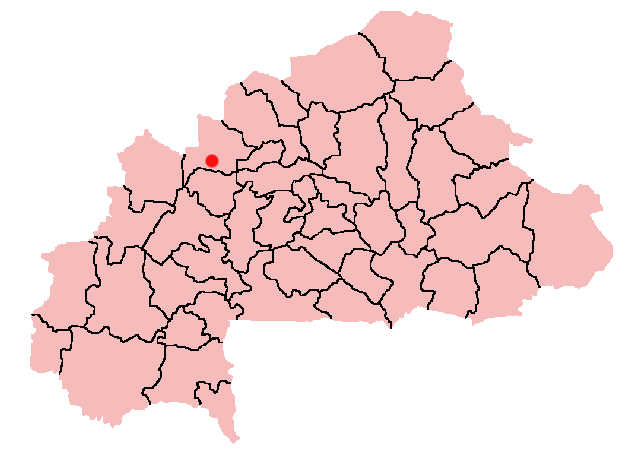
- Location of Tougan in Burkina Faso

Tougan is a town located in the province of Sourou in Burkina Faso. It is the capital of Sourou Province.
