= Jon Busch =

American soccer player (born 1976)

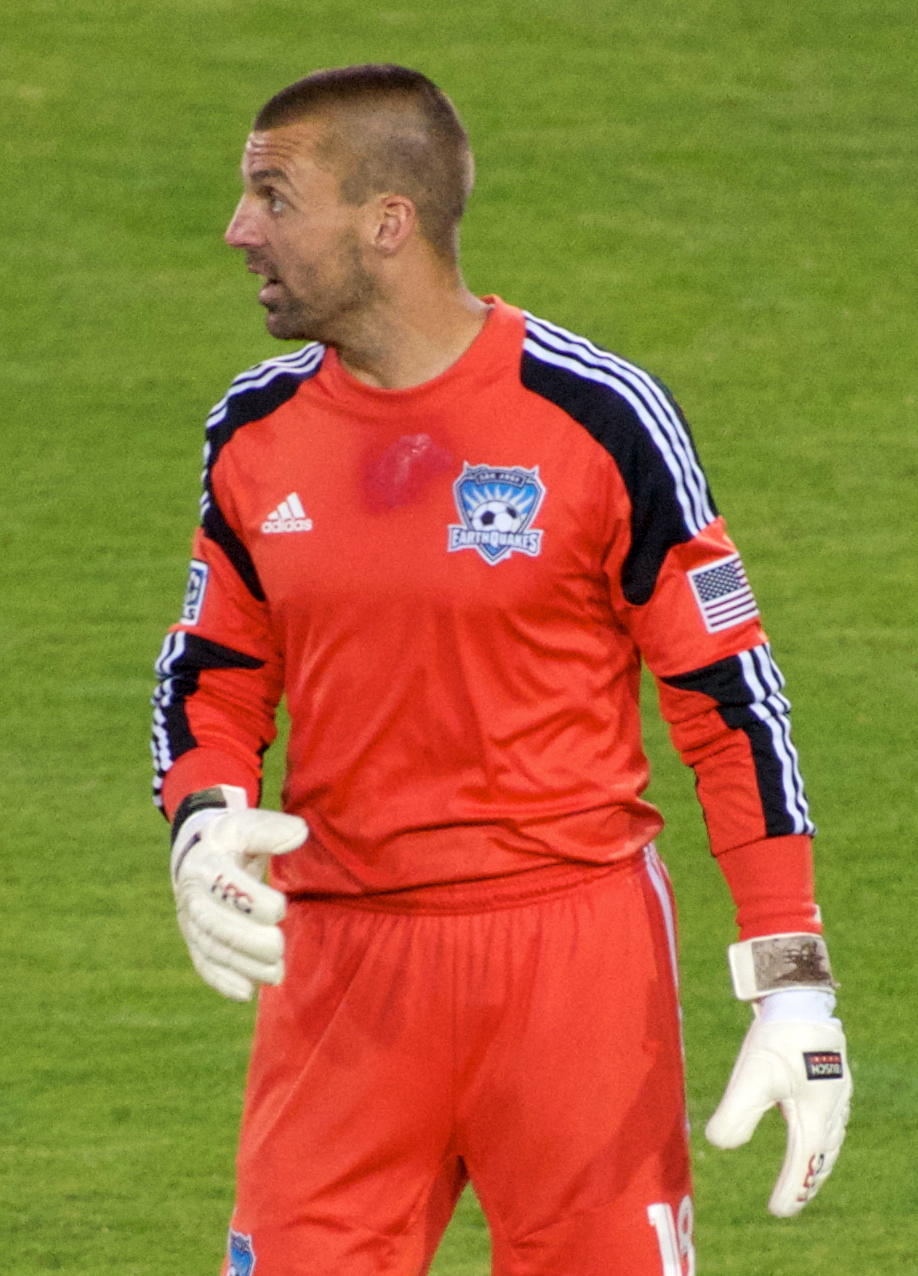
- Busch with the San Jose Earthquakes in 2013

Personal information
- Full name: Jon Busch
- Date of birth: August 18, 1976 (age 50)
- Place of birth: New York City, United States
- Height: 5 ft 10 in (1.78 m)
- Position: Goalkeeper

College career
Years	Team	Apps	(Gls)
1994–1996	Charlotte 49ers		

Senior career*
Years	Team	Apps	(Gls)
1997	Worcester Wildfire	14	(0)
1997	Carolina Dynamo	2	(0)
1998–2000	Hampton Roads Mariners	64	(0)
2001	Hershey Wildcats	25	(0)
2002–2006	Columbus Crew	84	(0)
2007–2009	Chicago Fire	63	(0)
2010–2014	San Jose Earthquakes	150	(0)
2015	Chicago Fire	12	(0)
2016–2017	Indy Eleven	59	(0)
Total		473	(0)

International career
1993	United States U17	4	(0)
2005	United States	1	(0)

Managerial career
- 2022: Hibernian (goalkeeping)
- 2023–: Pittsburgh Riverhounds (goalkeeping)
- * Club domestic league appearances and goals

Jon Busch (born August 18, 1976) is an American professional soccer coach and former player, who played as a goalkeeper. Busch is currently the goalkeeping coach for USL Championship club Pittsburgh Riverhounds SC.

He is best remembered for his captivating saves, despite his shorter stature for an elite goalkeeper, and spent most of his 21-year professional playing years in Major League Soccer, appearing for the Columbus Crew, Chicago Fire and San Jose Earthquakes. Busch also represented the United States at both youth and senior level.

Arguably his best season was in 2008 when he was named MLS Goalkeeper of the Year. As of the end of the 2015 season, Busch ranks fourth in MLS history in number of shutouts.

== Youth and college ==
Busch played at Guilderland High School in Guilderland, New York, near Albany, where he was named a high school All-American. He was ranked within the top 25 best players in the nation as a senior.

In college, Busch was a NSCAA First Team All-American in 1996, when he help lead UNC Charlotte to their first ever appearance in the College Cup and a school-record 19 wins. He recorded a career-high 12 shutouts that season, including two in the NCAA Tournament and a career-low 0.89 goals against average (GAA) en route to being named Conference USA Defensive Player of the Year. Overall, he was a First Team All-Conference selection three times and was named to Soccer America's First Team Freshman All-America team in 1994. In total, Busch spent 3 seasons with UNC Charlotte.

== Club career ==
=== A-League Years (1997–2001) ===
Busch was undrafted out of college by Major League Soccer. Instead, he spent a number of years in the United Soccer Leagues. He was drafted in 1997 by Nashville Metros with the 2nd overall pick in the A-League draft, but opted to split his first year with Worcester Wildfire and Carolina Dynamo. Busch then moved on to Hampton Roads Mariners, where he spent 3 seasons. He was named the team MVP in his second season. His breakout season came in 2001 with the Hershey Wildcats. He won 14 games and posted 13 shutouts while leading the team to the A-League National Championship match. Busch was named the A-League Goalkeeper of the Year and was selected the Division II circuit's first-team All-League keeper.

=== Columbus Crew (2002–2006) ===
Major League Soccer took note of his USL play and it resulted in Busch being drafted by Columbus Crew with the 23rd overall pick of the 2002 MLS SuperDraft. Busch did not become a starter for the Crew immediately, sharing the duties in his first MLS season with incumbent Tom Presthus. He became a starter by 2003, but did not do very well as Columbus floundered in the standings. In contrast, both the Crew and Busch had terrific 2004 regular seasons, as the team, led by Busch's goaltending, embarked on a league-record 18-game undefeated streak. Busch was a finalist for the 2004 MLS Goalkeeper of the Year Award for his performance, and his impact on the team's season was cited as the third-highest impact of any MLS player on any MLS team in the history of the league by MLSnet writer Jeff Bradley. In 2005, he was sidelined by a knee injury for most of the season, leading the Crew to acquire Jonny Walker. The Crew's goalkeeping injury woes intensified in 2006, as Busch was one of several injured keepers on the team roster, managing only eight games. He was waived prior to the 2007 season.

=== Chicago Fire (2007–2009) ===
Busch found himself the only player picked in the 2007 MLS Waiver Draft, selected by Toronto FC. On March 21 of the same year, he was waived by Toronto as the team found itself over the limit for senior international roster spots. He was subsequently traded to Chicago Fire in exchange for a fourth-round pick in the 2009 MLS Supplemental Draft. Busch was to serve primarily as a backup keeper in 2007 and only made it into three matches all season.

However, with the departure of starter Matt Pickens to Queens Park Rangers of England's second-tier Football League Championship, Busch ultimately inherited the starter's role with the Fire to start the 2008 season. He was named Fire MVP for the 2008 season after being the only Fire player to start and play 90 minutes in every MLS match during the regular season (2700 minutes). Busch posted the best saves percentage in the league (78.2) after making 122 saves on 156 shots faced. Busch tied for most shutouts in the league (10), while also tying a Fire single season shutout record shared with Matt Pickens for his 10 shutouts in 2007. For his efforts, Busch was named the MLS Goalkeeper of the Year. In March 2010, Busch was waived by the Chicago Fire.

=== San Jose Earthquakes (2010–2014) ===
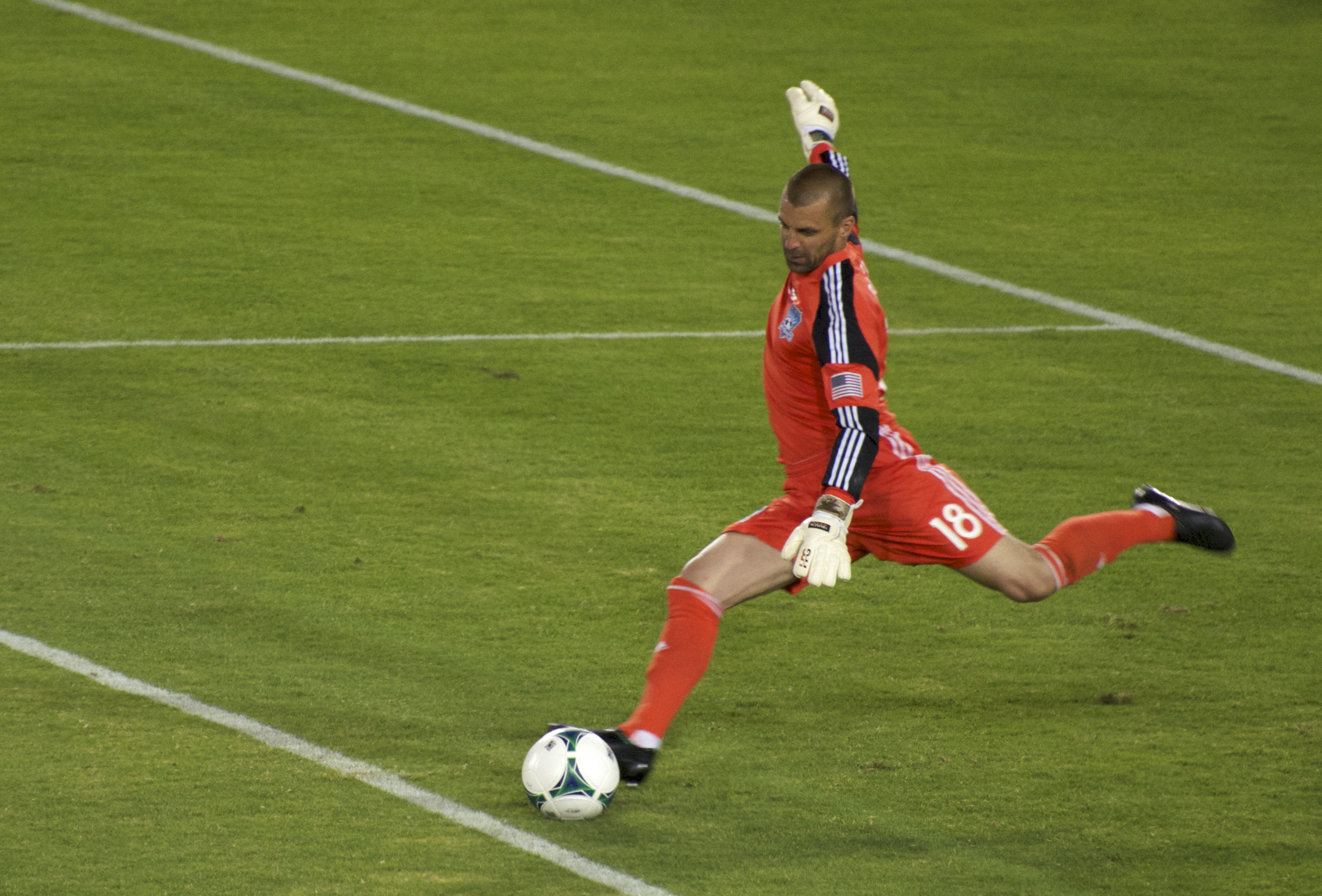
Goal kick versus LA Galaxy in 2013

Shortly after being waived, Busch was signed by San Jose Earthquakes. In 2014, Busch recorded a league best and franchise record 138 saves in a season, besting Joe Cannon's mark set in 2000.

=== Chicago Fire (2015) ===
Busch returned to Chicago for his second stint with the club in January 2015. At the end of the season his contract option was declined.

=== Indy Eleven (2016–2017) ===
In January 2016, Busch signed as a free agent with the NASL club Indy Eleven. He will also serve as the club's Director of Goalkeeping, with duties to include first team coaching and scouting, serving as a guest coach with the Indy Eleven NPSL squad and assisting with the Indy Eleven Summer Soccer Clinic series.

=== Retirement ===
In May 2018, Busch and the Columbus Crew agreed on a one-day contract so he could officially retire as a player of the Crew, the club which he called home in his retirement letter.

== International career ==
Busch earned his first and only cap for the United States on March 9, 2005. He shut out Colombia in a friendly, but despite the performance was not called back into the squad.

He has also represented the U.S. at the U-17 and U-20 levels, as well as having played in the 1993 FIFA U-17 World Championship in Japan.

== Coaching ==
Busch obtained his "B" coaching license in January 2003. While playing for the Columbus Crew, he also trained goalkeepers in Columbus' youth soccer league, the Ohio Football Club. He became the academy goalkeeping coach at Indy Eleven in 2017, while also working with United States youth squads. Busch was appointed to a coaching position at Scottish club Hibernian in February 2022.

In January 2023, Busch was appointed goalkeeping coach for the Pittsburgh Riverhounds of the USL Championship.

== Personal ==
Busch is the son of Madeline and Robert Busch. Robert Busch is a Lutheran pastor. Jon Busch married Nicole Blair on December 11, 2004.

== Honors ==
=== Club ===
Columbus Crew

- U.S. Open Cup: 2002
- MLS Supporters' Shield: 2004

San Jose Earthquakes

- MLS Supporters' Shield: 2012
- Club record saves in a season: 138 (2014)

=== United States ===
- CONCACAF Gold Cup: runner-up 2009

=== Individual ===
- MLS Goalkeeper of the Year: 2008
- MLS Best XI: 2008
