= Sourou Province =

Coordinates: 13°04′N 3°04′W

Sourou
- Province
- Location in Burkina Faso

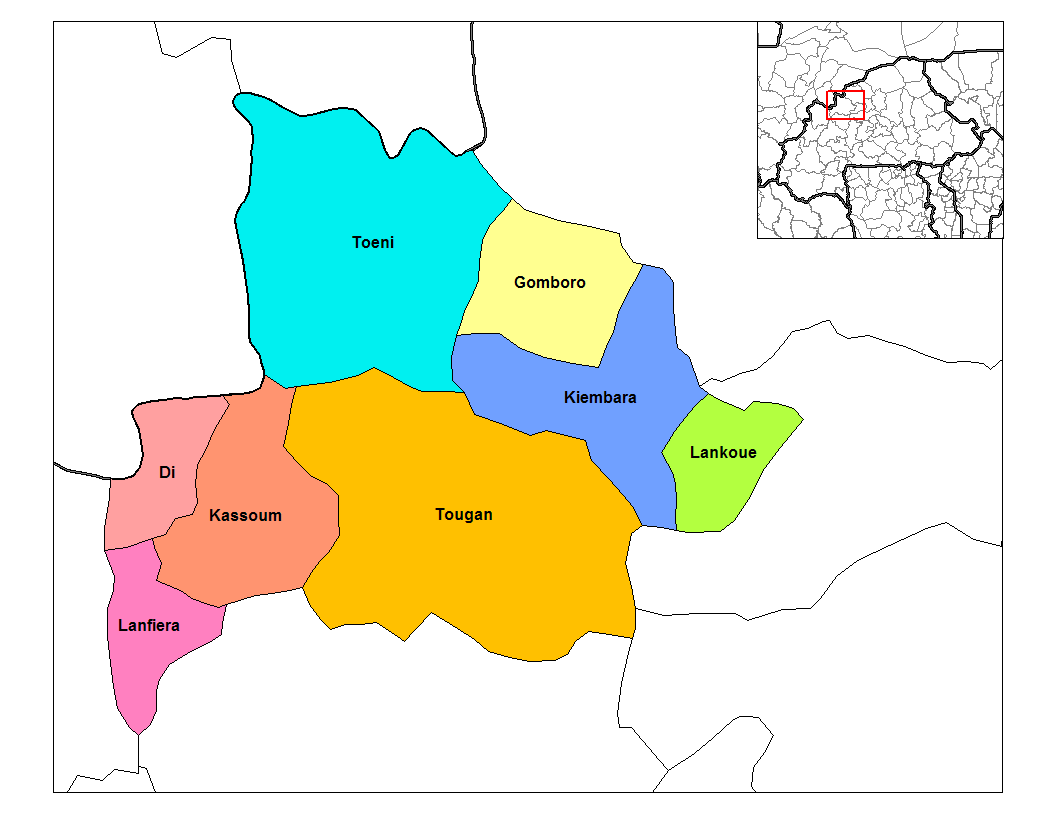
- Provincial map of its departments
- Country: Burkina Faso
- Region: Boucle du Mouhoun
- Capital: Tougan

Area
  - Province: 5,768 km^{2} (2,227 sq mi)

Population (2019 census)
  - Province: 284,947
  - Density: 49.40/km^{2} (127.9/sq mi)
  - Urban: 26,347
- Time zone: UTC+0 (GMT 0)

Sourou is one of the 45 provinces of Burkina Faso, located in its Boucle du Mouhoun.

Its capital is Tougan.

== Education ==
In 2011 the province had 162 primary schools and 17 secondary schools.

== Healthcare ==
In 2011 the province had 27 health and social promotion centers (Centres de santé et de promotion sociale), 5 doctors and 89 nurses.

== Departments ==
Sourou is divided into 8 departments:

- Di
- Gomboro
- Kassoum
- Kiembara
- Lanfiera
- Lankoue
- Toeni
- Tougan

== See also ==
- Regions of Burkina Faso
- Provinces of Burkina Faso
- Departments of Burkina Faso
