= 2011 Philadelphia Union season =

Philadelphia Union
2011 season
- Owner: Keystone Sports & Entertainment
- Manager: Peter Nowak
- Stadium: PPL Park (18,500)
- Major League Soccer: Eastern Conference: 3rd Overall table: 8th
- MLS Cup: Eastern Conference Semifinals
- U.S. Open Cup: Did not qualify
- Top goalscorer: Sébastien Le Toux (11)
- Highest home attendance: 19,178 v Toronto FC; October 15, 2011
- Lowest home attendance: 15,149 v Seattle Sounders FC; April 16, 2011
- Average home league attendance: 18,259; 10 sellouts
Home colors	Away colors	Third colors

The 2011 Philadelphia Union season was the second season of the team's existence, competing in Major League Soccer, the top flight of American soccer. The team was managed by former MLS player Peter Nowak, in his second season with the club.

== Background ==
At the end of the 2010 season, Philadelphia was 7th in the Eastern Conference, which unfortunately was not enough to get them into the MLS Playoffs. During the off-season, the team lost Fred, Seitz, Salinas, and Moreno through re-entry and expansion drafts. The Union did acquire 2 new players before the 2011 SuperDraft in January: one through trade (Brian Carroll from Columbus Crew) and their first homegrown player (Zach Pfeffer). In the MLS SuperDraft, Philadelphia had selected three new players for the team: Zac MacMath (GK from University of Maryland and 5th pick overall), Michael Farfan (M from University of North Carolina, 23rd overall) and Levi Houapeu (F from University of Maryland, Baltimore County, 41st overall). During the Supplemental Draft, the Union picked up another 3 players: Ryan Richter (MF/F), Josh Walburn (D) and Matt Marcin (MF).

Shortly after the SuperDraft, the team released MF Toni Ståhl, who had only played a handful of minutes with the team in 2010, and was sent off in the first game of the season with 2 yellow cards. Toward the end of January, Philadelphia released their other goalie from the 2010 season, Brad Knighton.

On January 20, Philadelphia introduced two new players: Colombians Faryd Mondragón (GK) and Carlos Valdés (D). Mondragón had recently come from playing with F.C. Cologne in the German Bundesliga, and has at least 50 caps with the Colombia nationaltTeam. Valdés comes from Club Independiente Santa Fe in the Colombian First Division, where he served as captain before coming to Philadelphia.

On January 11, the Union became the 13th team in MLS to gain a shirt sponsor. Bimbo Bakeries USA will sponsor the team in exchange for US$12 million (three million for four years). Bimbo Bakeries has sponsored other teams in Mexico and Costa Rica, but this is their first time in MLS.

== Review ==
=== Preseason ===
Philadelphia Union will play their first pre-season game against the U-17 US Men National Team on February 6. They will then play two friendlies against university teams, University of South Florida and University of Central Florida, on February 10 and 13 respectively. Their last pre-season game in Orlando will be against Orlando City, a new team in the USL Professional Division, on February 19.

The club announced the signing of former MLS Most Valuable Player Carlos Ruiz on February 22.

=== League Start ===
Philadelphia Union's first game was away against Houston Dynamo on March 19. Their first home game at PPL Park was against the Vancouver Whitecaps on March 26.

== 2011 roster ==
As of September 23, 2011.

Note: Flags indicate national team as defined under FIFA eligibility rules; some limited exceptions apply. Players may hold more than one non-FIFA nationality.

No.	Pos.	Nation	Player
1	GK	COL	Faryd Mondragón (captain)
2	DF	ENG	Joe Tait
3	DF	COL	Juan Diego González
4	DF	USA	Danny Califf (vice-captain)
5	DF	COL	Carlos Valdés
6	MF	BRA	Stefani Miglioranzi
7	MF	USA	Brian Carroll
8	MF	COL	Roger Torres (on loan from América de Cali)
9	FW	FRA	Sébastien Le Toux
10	FW	COD	Danny Mwanga
11	MF	USA	Freddy Adu (DP)
12	FW	CIV	Levi Houapeu
13	MF	USA	Kyle Nakazawa
14	MF	USA	Amobi Okugo

No.	Pos.	Nation	Player
15	MF	USA	Gabriel Farfan
16	FW	SRB	Veljko Paunović
17	MF	TRI	Keon Daniel
18	GK	USA	Zac MacMath
19	FW	USA	Jack McInerney
21	MF	USA	Michael Farfan
22	MF	USA	Justin Mapp
23	MF	USA	Ryan Richter
24	GK	TRI	Thorne Holder
25	DF	USA	Sheanon Williams
26	MF	USA	Morgan Langley
27	MF	USA	Zach Pfeffer
31	GK	USA	Chase Harrison

== Match results ==
Win Loss Tie

=== Preseason friendlies ===
February 6, 2011 1	Philadelphia Union	1–1	U-17 U.S. Men's National Team	Orlando, Florida
	Le Toux 9'		Muyl 80'	Stadium: UCF Track and Soccer Complex

February 10, 2011 2	University of South Florida	0–2	Philadelphia Union	Deltona, Florida
3:30 ET			Le Toux 19'; Mwanga 33'	Stadium: Dewey O. Boster Sports Complex

February 13, 2011 3	University of Central Florida	0–1	Philadelphia Union	Orlando, Florida
			Pfeffer 53'	Stadium: UCF Track and Soccer Complex

February 19, 2011 4	Orlando City S.C.	1–0	Philadelphia Union	Orlando, Florida
7:00 ET	Neal 19'		Valdés (red card) 18'	Stadium: Citrus Bowl

February 28, 2011 5	Ergotelis F.C.	1–1	Philadelphia Union	Heraklion, Greece
	Karelis 88' (pen.)		Ruiz 27'	Stadium: Pankritio Stadium

March 2, 2011 6	Chersonissos F.C.	0–5	Philadelphia Union	Heraklion, Greece
			Agorsor 48', 82'; McInerney 55', 75'; Mwanga 84'	Stadium: Pankritio Stadium

=== MLS regular season ===
The Union are 11-8-15 overall, 7-1-9 at home, 4-7-6 on the road.

March 19, 2011 1	Houston Dynamo	0–1	Philadelphia Union	Houston, Texas
7:30 PM CT	Davis (yellow card) 22'	Report	Califf 5'; Ruiz (yellow card) 20'; Valdés (yellow card) 44'	Stadium: Robertson Stadium; Attendance: 19,385; Referee: Abbey Okulaja

March 26, 2011 2	Philadelphia Union	1–0	Vancouver Whitecaps FC	Chester, Pennsylvania
4:00 PM ET	Nakazawa (yellow card) 26'; Califf (yellow card) 31'; Mwanga (yellow card) 35'; Ruiz 77'	Report	Khalfan (yellow card) 45+'; Rochat (yellow card) 48'; Hassli (yellow card) 25' (yellow-red card) 57'	Stadium: PPL Park; Attendance: 18,591 (SO); Referee: Yader Reyes

April 2, 2011 3	Los Angeles Galaxy	1–0	Philadelphia Union	Carson, California
7:30 PM PT	Leonardo 33'; López (yellow card) 51'; Birchall (red card) 53'; Ricketts (yellow card) 60'; Beckham (yellow card) 89'; Donovan (yellow card) 90+'	Report	Ruiz (yellow card) 53'; Williams (yellow card) 63'; Harvey (yellow card) 78'; Califf (yellow card) 88'; McInerney (red card) 90+'	Stadium: The Home Depot Center; Attendance: 24,998; Referee: Paul Ward

April 9, 2011 4	Philadelphia Union	1–0	New York Red Bulls	Chester, Pennsylvania
7:00 PM ET	Torres 68'; Mwanga (yellow card) 77'	Report	Márquez (yellow card) 14'; Richards (yellow card) 29'; Miller (yellow card) 82'	Stadium: PPL Park; Attendance: 19,027 (SO); Referee: Alex Prus

April 16, 2011 5	Philadelphia Union	1–1	Seattle Sounders FC	Chester, Pennsylvania
4:00 PM ET	Ruiz 32'; Miglioranzi (yellow card) 55'; Okugo (yellow card) 65'; Valdés (yellow card) 88'	Report	Alonso (yellow card) 30'; Fernández 90+'	Stadium: PPL Park; Attendance: 15,149; Referee: Terry Vaughn

April 30, 2011 6	Philadelphia Union	1–0	San Jose Earthquakes	Chester, Pennsylvania
4:00 PM ET	Okugo (yellow card) 28'; Mondragón (yellow card) 31'; Harvey (red card) 41'; Le Toux 76' (pen.)	Report	McDonald (yellow card) 31'; Convey (yellow card) 60'	Stadium: PPL Park; Attendance: 18,279; Referee: Mark Geiger

May 6, 2011 7	Portland Timbers	1–0	Philadelphia Union	Portland, Oregon
7:30 PM PT	Perlaza (yellow card) 18'; Futty 72'; Brunner (yellow card) 87'; Wallace (yellow card) 90+'	Report	Mapp (yellow card) 25'; Williams (yellow card) 87'	Stadium: Jeld-Wen Field; Attendance: 18,627; Referee: Silviu Petrescu

May 11, 2011 8	Philadelphia Union	1–1	Los Angeles Galaxy	Chester, Pennsylvania
7:30 PM ET	Carroll (yellow card) 58'; Torres (yellow card) 76'; Mwanga 84'; Williams (yellow card) 90+'	Report	Donovan 24'; Gonzalez (yellow card) 78'; DeLaGarza (yellow card) 87'	Stadium: PPL Park; Attendance: 19,178 (SO); Referee: Andrew Chapin

May 14, 2011 9	FC Dallas	2–0	Philadelphia Union	Frisco, Texas
7:30 PM CT	Shea 18'; Castillo 43'	Report	Mwanga (yellow card) 10'; Carroll (yellow card) 34'	Stadium: Pizza Hut Park; Attendance: 12,109; Referee: Jasen Anno

May 21, 2011 10	Philadelphia Union	2–1	Chicago Fire	Chester, Pennsylvania
8:00 PM ET	Califf (yellow card) 41'; Harvey (yellow card) 54'; M. Farfan 64'; Ruiz 74'	Recap	Ristic (yellow card) 30'; Oduro (yellow card) 59'; Oduro 68'; Paladini (yellow card) 72'; Puerari (yellow card) 90+'	Stadium: PPL Park; Attendance: 18,372; Referee: Hilario Grajeda

May 28, 2011 11	Toronto FC	2–6	Philadelphia Union	Toronto, Ontario, Canada
12:30 PM ET	dos Santos 51', 59'	Recap	G. Farfan 3'; Mapp 11', 61'; Harvey (yellow card) 38'; Nakazawa 45'; Mwanga 71', 89'	Stadium: BMO Field; Attendance: 20,122; Referee: Niko Bratsis

June 4, 2011 12	Colorado Rapids	1–1	Philadelphia Union	Commerce City, Colorado
7:00 PM MT	Wallace (yellow card) 26'; Casey 63'	Recap	Mwanga 66'	Stadium: Dick's Sporting Goods Park; Attendance: 12,779; Referee: Jason Anno

June 11, 2011 13	Philadelphia Union	1–1	Real Salt Lake	Chester, Pennsylvania
4:00 PM ET	Daniel 24'	Recap	Russell (yellow card) 43'; Espíndola 53'; Alexandre (yellow card) 54'	Stadium: PPL Park; Attendance: 18,728 (SO); Referee: Jorge Gonzalez

June 18, 2011 14	Vancouver Whitecaps FC	1–0	Philadelphia Union	Vancouver, British Columbia, Canada
7:00 PM PT	Rochat 12'; Dunfield (yellow card) 22'	Recap	Valdés (yellow card) 36'; Carroll (yellow card) 51'	Stadium: Empire Field; Attendance: 20,168; Referee: Alex Prus

June 22, 2011 15	Philadelphia Union	0–0	Sporting Kansas City	Chester, Pennsylvania
7:30 PM ET	Paunović (yellow card) 31'	Recap	César (yellow card) 29'; Nielsen (yellow card) 90+'	Stadium: PPL Park; Attendance: 18,127; Referee: Terry Vaughn

June 25, 2011 16	Philadelphia Union	3–2	Chivas USA	Chester, Pennsylvania
7:30 PM ET	Paunović 48'; Valdés (yellow card) 64'; Ruiz 64'; Mwanga 82'	Report	Umaña 28'; Braun 77'	Stadium: PPL Park; Attendance: 18,139; Referee: Jair Marrufo

July 2, 2011 17	D.C. United	2–2	Philadelphia Union	Washington, D.C.
7:00 PM ET	Wolff 44'; Najar 58'	Report	Harvey (yellow card) 16'; Kitchen 49' (o.g.); Ruiz 84'	Stadium: RFK Stadium; Attendance: 13,365; Referee: Abbey Okulaja

July 9, 2011 18	San Jose Earthquakes	0–0	Philadelphia Union	Santa Clara, California
7:30 PM PT	Johnson (yellow card) 64'; Corrales (yellow card) 66'; Hernandez (yellow card) 89'	Report		Stadium: Buck Shaw Stadium; Attendance: 9,794; Referee: Elias Bazakos

July 16, 2011 19	New England Revolution	0–3	Philadelphia Union	Foxborough, Massachusetts
7:00 PM ET	Feilhaber (yellow card) 49' (yellow-red card) 66'	Report	Ruiz 12'; Valdés 24'; Daniel (yellow card) 70'; Williams 90+'	Stadium: Gillette Stadium; Attendance: 13,414; Referee: Chris Penso

July 29, 2011 20	Philadelphia Union	1–2	Colorado Rapids	Chester, Pennsylvania
7:30 PM ET	Williams (red card) 64'; Torres 90+'	Report	Mastroeni 35'; Nyassi 45'; Folan (yellow card) 65'; Mullan (yellow card) 67'	Stadium: PPL Park; Attendance: 18,770 (SO); Referee: Jorge Gonzalez

August 3, 2011 21	Chicago Fire	1–1	Philadelphia Union	Bridgeview, Illinois
8:00 PM CT	Paunović 34'; Carroll (yellow card) 35'	Report	Pardo 54'; Pause (yellow card) 85'	Stadium: Toyota Park; Attendance: 10,557; Referee: Michael Kennedy

August 6, 2011 22	Philadelphia Union	1–1	Houston Dynamo	Chester, Pennsylvania
7:30 PM ET	McInerney 15'; Valdés (yellow card) 83'	Report	Boswell (yellow card) 78'; Cameron 84'	Stadium: PPL Park; Attendance: 18,524 (SO); Referee: Terry Vaughn

August 13, 2011 23	Philadelphia Union	2–2	FC Dallas	Chester, Pennsylvania
8:00 PM ET	Valdés (yellow card) 27'; Le Toux 33' (pen.), 84' (pen.); McInerney (yellow card) 68'	Report	Santos 16'; Shea 45+'; Santos (yellow card) 56'; John (yellow card) 24' (red card) 80'	Stadium: PPL Park; Attendance: 18,811 (SO); Referee: Geoff Gamble

August 20, 2011 24	Columbus Crew	2–1	Philadelphia Union	Columbus, Ohio
8:00 PM ET	Rentería 37'; Hesmer (yellow card) 42'; Mendoza 51'; James (yellow card) 58'; Heinemann (yellow card) 84'	Report	Paunović 42'; M. Farfan (yellow card) 90+'; Valdés (yellow card) 90+'	Stadium: Columbus Crew Stadium; Attendance: 13,869; Referee: Mark Kadlecik

September 3, 2011 25	Real Salt Lake	2–1	Philadelphia Union	Sandy, Utah
7:00 PM MT	Beckerman 18'; Schuler 26'; Russell (yellow card) 35'	Report	Le Toux 30'; Califf (yellow card) 67'	Stadium: Rio Tinto Stadium; Attendance: 18,720; Referee: Hilario Grajeda

September 7, 2011 26	Philadelphia Union	4–4	New England Revolution	Chester, Pennsylvania
8:00 PM ET	Torres 28'; Adu 54'; Adu (yellow card) 76'; Le Toux 80' (pen.), 90+1'	Report	Soares 9'; Lekić 21'; Zerka 25'; Feilhaber 33'; Joseph (yellow card) 36'; Caraglio (yellow card) 71'; Feilhaber (yellow card) 90+'	Stadium: PPL Park; Attendance: 16,148; Referee: Jorge Gonzalez

September 10, 2011 27	Philadelphia Union	0–0	Portland Timbers	Chester, Pennsylvania
7:30 PM ET	Valdés (yellow card) 45+'	Report	Alhassan (yellow card) 76'; Jewsbury (yellow card) 80'	Stadium: PPL Park; Attendance: 18,504 (SO); Referee: Chris Penso

September 17, 2011 28	Philadelphia Union	1–0	Columbus Crew	Chester, Pennsylvania
7:30 PM ET	Le Toux 32'	Report	Rusmir (yellow card) 12'	Stadium: PPL Park; Attendance: 18,906 (SO); Referee: Alex Prus

September 23, 2011 29	Sporting Kansas City	1–1	Philadelphia Union	Kansas City, Kansas
7:30 PM CT	Bravo 56'	Report	Valdés (yellow card) 60'; Le Toux 63'	Stadium: Livestrong Sporting Park; Attendance: 18,778; Referee: Baldomero Toledo

September 29, 2011 30	Philadelphia Union	3–2	D.C. United	Chester, Pennsylvania
7:30 PM ET	Le Toux 4', 16'; M. Farfan 57'	Report	De Rosario 21'; Najar 30'; Kitchen (yellow card) 39'; McDonald (yellow card) 70'	Stadium: PPL Park; Attendance: 17,963; Referee: Ricardo Salazar

October 2, 2011 31	Chivas USA	1–1	Philadelphia Union	Carson, California
5:00 PM PT	Júnior Lopes (yellow card) 21'; Ángel 90'	Report	G. Farfan (yellow card) 28'; Mapp 59'; MacMath (yellow card) 77'	Stadium: The Home Depot Center; Attendance: 16,134; Referee: Michael Kennedy

October 8, 2011 32	Seattle Sounders FC	0–2	Philadelphia Union	Seattle
7:00 PM PT	Neagle (yellow card) 63'	Report	Adu 60'; Carroll 70'	Stadium: CenturyLink Field; Attendance: 36,304; Referee: Baldomero Toledo

October 15, 2011 33	Philadelphia Union	1–1	Toronto FC	Chester, Pennsylvania
4:00 PM ET	Le Toux 42'	Report	Iro (yellow card) 43'; Johnson 57'	Stadium: PPL Park; Attendance: 19,178 (SO); Referee: Silviu Petrescu

October 20, 2011 34	New York Red Bulls	1–0	Philadelphia Union	Harrison, New Jersey
8:00 PM ET	Richards 8'; Tainio (yellow card) 29'; Rodgers (yellow card) 66'	Report	Carroll (yellow card) 55'	Stadium: Red Bull Arena; Attendance: 25,044; Referee: Mark Geiger

=== MLS Cup Playoffs ===
October 30, 2011 Conference Semis	Philadelphia Union	1–2	Houston Dynamo	Chester, Pennsylvania
5:00 PM ET	G. Farfan (yellow card) 4'; Le Toux 7'; Miglioranzi (yellow card) 17'; Williams (yellow card) 40'; Carroll (yellow card) 65'	Report	Hainault 5'; Cruz (yellow card) 27'; Carr 30'; Moffat (yellow card) 40'	Stadium: PPL Park; Attendance: 18,539 (SO); Referee: Jair Marrufo

November 3, 2011 Conference Semis	Houston Dynamo	1–0	Philadelphia Union	Houston, Texas
8:30 PM CT	Valdés (yellow card) 30'; G. Farfan (yellow card) 51'	Report	Ching 45+'; Carr (yellow card) 67'	Stadium: Robertson Stadium; Attendance: 24,749; Referee: Ricardo Salazar

=== U.S. Open Cup ===
April 6, 2011 Qualification Play-In	D.C. United	2–2 (4–2 p)	Philadelphia Union	Boyds, Maryland
19:30 EDT	Fred (yellow card) 25'; Wolff 45'; Jakovic (yellow card) 70'; Woolard 111'	Report	Ruiz 18'; Ruiz (yellow card) 73'; Valdés (yellow card) 39' (yellow-red card) 86'; Carroll 118'; Nowak (manager) (red card) 118'	Stadium: Maryland SoccerPlex; Attendance: 2,347; Referee: Andrew Chapin
	Penalties
	Pontius (penalty scored); Barklage (penalty scored); Najar (penalty scored); Boskovic (penalty scored)		(penalty scored) Le Toux; (penalty missed) McInerney; (penalty missed) Torres; (penalty scored) Nakawaza

=== Friendlies ===
May 31, 2011 1	Reading United A.C.	1–1	Philadelphia Union	Reading, Pennsylvania
7:30 ET	Harmon 90+'	Report	G. Farfan 45'	Stadium: Don Thomas Stadium

July 20, 2011 2	Philadelphia Union	1–0	Everton	Chester, Pennsylvania
7:30 ET	Hernández 87'; Torres (yellow card) 90+'	Report	Heitinga (yellow card) 84' (yellow-red card) 90+'	Stadium: PPL Park; Attendance: 18,582 (SO); Referee: Jorge Gonzalez

July 23, 2011 3	Philadelphia Union	1–2	Real Madrid	Philadelphia
9:00 ET	M. Farfan 80'; González (yellow card) 90+'	Report	Callejón 2'; Özil 11'	Stadium: Lincoln Financial Field; Attendance: 57,305; Referee: Alex Prus

August 24, 2011 4	Harrisburg City Islanders	3–5	Philadelphia Union	Harrisburg, Pennsylvania
7:00 ET	Becerra 6'; Welker 19'; Angulo 85'	Report	Mapp 48'; Richter 49'; Pfeffer 60'; Torres 76'; Tait 78'	Stadium: Skyline Sports Complex

=== MLS Reserve League ===
The Union Reserves are 2-7-1 overall, 2-3-0 at home, 0-4-1 on the road.

April 10, 2011 Reserve 1	Philadelphia Union Reserves	2–1	New York Red Bulls Reserves	Wallingford, Pennsylvania
10:00 AM EDT	McInerney 50'; McInerney (yellow card) 72'; Agorsor 81'	Report	Kassel (yellow card) 27'; Rooney (yellow card) 39'; Rooney 52'	Stadium: Chester Park

May 16, 2011 Reserve 2	Philadelphia Union Reserves	0–1	D.C. United Reserves	Wallingford, Pennsylvania
4:00 PM EDT	Paunović (yellow card) 22'; Nakazawa (yellow card) 45'	Report	Barklage 43'; Fred (yellow card) 52'; Korb (yellow card) 61'; Brettschneider (yellow card) 88'	Stadium: Chester Park

May 28, 2011 Reserve 3	Toronto FC Reserves	0–0	Philadelphia Union Reserves	Toronto, Ontario, Canada
5:00 PM EDT	Henry (yellow card) 44'	Report		Stadium: Cherry Beach

July 3, 2011 Reserve 4	D.C. United Reserves	4–1	Philadelphia Union Reserves	Washington, D.C.
10:00 AM EDT	King 22'; Morsink 23'; King (yellow card) 41'; Ngwenya 69' (pen.); Ngwenya (yellow card) 76'; Morsink (yellow card) 78'; Ngwenya (yellow card) 88'	Report	Ackley (yellow card) 28'; Madison 45'; M. Farfan (yellow card) 76'	Stadium: D.C. United Training Complex; Attendance: 128

July 18, 2011 Reserve 5	New England Revolution Reserves	3–1	Philadelphia Union Reserves	Foxborough, Massachusetts
10:00 AM EDT	Koger 27'; Sousa 60'; Fagundez 85'	Report	Torres 48' (pen.); Okugo (yellow card) 82'	Stadium: Gillette Stadium; Attendance: Jan Halaska

August 15, 2011 Reserve 6	New York Red Bulls Reserves	2–1	Philadelphia Union Reserves	Montclair, New Jersey
3:00 PM EDT	Arteaga 48', 55'	Report	Torres 18'	Stadium: MSU Soccer Park

August 21, 2011 Reserve 7	Columbus Crew Reserves	1–0	Philadelphia Union Reserves	Columbus, Ohio
10:00 AM EDT	Catalano (yellow card) 31'; Anor 70'; Horton (yellow card) 81'	Report	Richter (yellow card) 34'	Stadium: Columbus Crew Stadium; Referee: Sorin Stoica

September 8, 2011 Reserve 8	Philadelphia Union Reserves	2–0	New England Revolution Reserves	Chester, Pennsylvania
10:00 AM EDT	McInerney 25'; Mwanga 45'	Report		Stadium: Leslie Quick Stadium

September 18, 2011 Reserve 9	Philadelphia Union Reserves	1–2	Columbus Crew Reserves	Wallingford, Pennsylvania
10:00 AM EDT	McInerney 14'; Tait (yellow card) 18'; Nakazawa (yellow card) 60'	Report	Ekpo 16'; Ekpo (yellow card) 63'; Gardner 75'	Stadium: Chester Park

October 16, 2011 Reserve 10	Philadelphia Union Reserves	1–3	Toronto FC Reserves	Wallingford, Pennsylvania
10:00 AM EDT	Pfeffer 60'; Okugo (yellow card) 87'	Report	Martina 16'; Richter 37' (o.g.); Cordon (yellow card) 62'; 81' (o.g.)	Stadium: Chester Park

== League table ==
Conference

Pos	Team	Pld	W	L	T	GF	GA	GD	Pts	Qualification
1	Sporting Kansas City	34	13	9	12	50	40	+10	51	MLS Cup Conference Semifinals
2	Houston Dynamo	34	12	9	13	45	41	+4	49	MLS Cup Conference Semifinals
3	Philadelphia Union	34	11	8	15	44	36	+8	48	MLS Cup Conference Semifinals
4	Columbus Crew	34	13	13	8	43	44	−1	47	MLS Cup Play-In Round
5	New York Red Bulls	34	10	8	16	50	44	+6	46	MLS Cup Play-In Round
6	Chicago Fire	34	9	9	16	46	45	+1	43	
7	D.C. United	34	9	13	12	49	52	−3	39	
8	Toronto FC	34	6	13	15	36	59	−23	33	
9	New England Revolution	34	5	16	13	38	58	−20	28	

Source: MLS

Overall

Pos	Team	Pld	W	L	T	GF	GA	GD	Pts	Qualification
1	LA Galaxy (S, C)	34	19	5	10	48	28	+20	67	CONCACAF Champions League
2	Seattle Sounders FC	34	18	7	9	56	37	+19	63	CONCACAF Champions League
3	Real Salt Lake	34	15	11	8	44	36	+8	53	CONCACAF Champions League
4	FC Dallas	34	15	12	7	42	39	+3	52	
5	Sporting Kansas City	34	13	9	12	50	40	+10	51	
6	Houston Dynamo	34	12	9	13	45	41	+4	49	CONCACAF Champions League
7	Colorado Rapids	34	12	9	13	44	41	+3	49	
8	Philadelphia Union	34	11	8	15	44	36	+8	48	
9	Columbus Crew	34	13	13	8	43	44	−1	47	
10	New York Red Bulls	34	10	8	16	50	44	+6	46	
11	Chicago Fire	34	9	9	16	46	45	+1	43	
12	Portland Timbers	34	11	14	9	40	48	−8	42	
13	D.C. United	34	9	13	12	49	52	−3	39	
14	San Jose Earthquakes	34	8	12	14	40	45	−5	38	
15	Chivas USA	34	8	14	12	41	43	−2	36	
16	Toronto FC	34	6	13	15	36	59	−23	33	CONCACAF Champions League
17	New England Revolution	34	5	16	13	38	58	−20	28	
18	Vancouver Whitecaps FC	34	6	18	10	35	55	−20	28	

Source: MLS
Rules for classification: 1) points; 2) head-to-head record; 3) goal difference; 4) number of goals scored
(C) Champions; (S) Supporters' Shield

=== Results summary ===
Overall								Home						Away					
Pld	Pts	W	L	T	GF	GA	GD	W	L	T	GF	GA	GD	W	L	T	GF	GA	GD
34	48	11	8	15	44	36	+8	7	1	9	24	18	+6	4	7	6	20	18	+2

Last updated: October 20, 2011
Pld = Matches played; Pts = Points; W = Matches won; T = Matches tied; L = Matches lost; GF = Goals for; GA = Goals against; GD = Goal difference

Round	1	2	3	4	5	6	7	8	9	10	11	12	13	14	15	16	17	18	19	20	21	22	23	24	25	26	27	28	29	30	31	32	33	34
Stadium	A	H	A	H	H	H	A	H	A	H	A	A	H	A	H	H	A	A	A	A	H	A	H	H	A	H	H	H	A	H	A	A	H	A
Result	W	W	L	W	T	W	L	T	L	W	W	T	T	L	T	W	T	T	W	L	T	T	T	L	L	T	T	W	T	W	T	W	T	L
Position	5	3	3	3	2	2	3	4	6	3	2	2	3	5	5	4	4	6	4	5	5	6	5	6	8	8	8	8	8	6	7	4	5	8

Updated to match(es) played on October 20, 2011. Source: MLS Results and League table
A = Away; H = Home; W = Win; L = Loss; T = Tie

== Squad information ==
=== Squad breakdown ===
Ages are as of March 19, 2011 (the date of their season opener).

No.	Name	Nationality	Position	Date of birth (age)	Signed From
Goalkeepers
1	Faryd Mondragón	(Colombia)	GK	June 21, 1971 (age 54)	(Germany) Cologne
18	Zac MacMath	(United States)	GK	August 7, 1991 (age 34)	(United States) University of Maryland
24	Thorne Holder	(Trinidad and Tobago)	GK	April 4, 1986 (age 39)	(United States) F.C. New York
31	Chase Harrison	(United States)	GK	April 2, 1984 (age 41)	(United States) Harrisburg City Islanders
Defenders
2	Joe Tait	(England)	CB	February 4, 1990 (age 36)	(United States) Dayton Dutch Lions
3	Juan Diego González	(Colombia)	CB	September 22, 1980 (age 45)	(Colombia) Deportivo Pereira
4	Danny Califf	(United States)	CB	March 17, 1980 (age 45)	(Denmark) Midtjylland
5	Carlos Valdés	(Colombia)	CB	May 22, 1985 (age 40)	(Colombia) Santa Fe
25	Sheanon Williams	(United States)	RB	March 17, 1990 (age 35)	(United States) Harrisburg City Islanders
Midfielders
6	Stefani Miglioranzi	(Brazil)	CM/DM	September 20, 1977 (age 48)	(United States) Los Angeles Galaxy
7	Brian Carroll	(United States)	CM/DM	July 20, 1981 (age 44)	(United States) Columbus Crew
8	Roger Torres	(Colombia)	AM	July 13, 1991 (age 34)	(Colombia) América de Cali
11	Freddy Adu	(United States)	AM	June 2, 1989 (age 36)	(Portugal) Benfica
13	Kyle Nakazawa	(United States)	CM	March 16, 1988 (age 37)	(United States) UCLA
14	Amobi Okugo	(United States)	CM/DM	March 13, 1991 (age 34)	(United States) UCLA
15	Gabriel Farfan	(United States)	CM/DM	June 23, 1988 (age 37)	(Mexico) Club América
17	Keon Daniel	(Trinidad and Tobago)	LW/RW	January 16, 1987 (age 39)	Puerto Rico Islanders
21	Michael Farfan	(United States)	LW/RW	June 23, 1988 (age 37)	(United States) University of North Carolina
22	Justin Mapp	(United States)	LW/RW	October 18, 1984 (age 41)	(United States) Chicago Fire
23	Ryan Richter	(United States)	CM/LB	April 12, 1989 (age 36)	(United States) La Salle University
26	Morgan Langley	(United States)	LW/RW	July 9, 1989 (age 36)	(United States) Harrisburg City Islanders
27	Zach Pfeffer	(United States)	AM	January 6, 1995 (age 31)	(United States) FC Delco
Forwards
9	Sébastien Le Toux	(France)	ST/AM	January 10, 1984 (age 42)	(United States) Seattle Sounders FC
10	Danny Mwanga	(Democratic Republic of the Congo)	ST	July 17, 1991 (age 34)	(United States) Oregon State University
12	Levi Houapeu	(Ivory Coast)	ST	June 22, 1989 (age 36)	(United States) UMBC
16	Veljko Paunović	(Serbia)	ST/AM	August 21, 1977 (age 48)	Unattached
19	Jack McInerney	(United States)	ST	August 5, 1992 (age 33)	(United States) Cobb Soccer Club

Last updated: September 23, 2011.
Source: Philadelphia Union

=== Statistics ===
Statistics are from all MLS league matches.

Nat	No	Player	Pos	Apps	Starts	G	A	Booked	Sent off (straight red)	Acquired	Salary
(United States)	2	Jordan Harvey*	DF	16	16	0	1	4	1	Expansion Draft	$63,125
(England)	2	Joe Tait	DF	0	0	0	0	0	0	Signed	$42,000
(Colombia)	3	Juan Diego González	DF	0	0	0	0	0	0	Signed	$193,462
(United States)	4	Danny Califf	DF	33	33	1	0	4	0	Signed	$250,000
(Colombia)	5	Carlos Valdés	DF	32	32	1	1	8	0	Signed	$180,000
(Brazil)	6	Stefani Miglioranzi	MF	17	11	0	0	1	0	Expansion Draft	$153,125
(United States)	7	Brian Carroll	MF	30	30	1	0	5	0	Trade	$160,000
(Colombia)	8	Roger Torres	MF	25	9	3	2	1	0	On Loan	$108,725
(France)	9	Sébastien Le Toux	FW	34	34	11	9	0	0	Expansion Draft	$179,000
(Democratic Republic of the Congo)	10	Danny Mwanga	FW	28	13	5	4	4	0	SuperDraft	$226,250 (GA)
(United States)	11	Freddy Adu	MF	11	6	2	0	0	0	Signed	$594,884 (DP)
(Ivory Coast)	12	Levi Houapeu	FW	0	0	0	0	0	0	SuperDraft	$32,604
(United States)	12	Chris Agorsor*	FW	0	0	0	0	0	0	Weighted lottery	$42,000
(United States)	13	Kyle Nakazawa	MF	22	14	1	3	1	0	SuperDraft	$44,000
(United States)	14	Amobi Okugo	MF	15	10	0	0	2	0	SuperDraft	$168,000 (GA)
(United States)	15	Gabriel Farfan	MF	22	18	1	2	1	0	Signed	$42,000
(Serbia)	16	Veljko Paunović	FW	17	16	3	3	1	0	Signed	$90,000
(Trinidad and Tobago)	17	Keon Daniel	MF	18	9	1	2	1	0	Signed	$46,410
(United States)	19	Jack McInerney	FW	18	5	1	0	1	1	SuperDraft	$135,417 (GA)
(Guatemala)	20	Carlos Ruiz*	FW	14	13	6	0	2	0	Signed	$306,671
(United States)	21	Michael Farfan	MF	21	13	2	3	1	0	SuperDraft	$79,500
(United States)	22	Justin Mapp	MF	29	24	3	4	1	0	Trade	$183,333
(United States)	23	Ryan Richter	MF	0	0	0	0	0	0	Supplemental Draft	$32,604
(United States)	25	Sheanon Williams	DF	32	32	1	3	4	1	Signed	$42,000
(United States)	26	Morgan Langley	MF	1	1	0	0	0	0	Signed	N/A
(United States)	27	Zach Pfeffer	MF	3	2	0	0	0	0	Signed	$65,000 (HG)
						44	35	46	3		

* = Not currently part of team.

|} Updated to match played October 20, 2011
Source: Philadelphia Union

=== Goalkeepers ===
Nat	No	Player	Apps	Starts	Record	GA	GAA	SO	Acquired	Salary
(Colombia)	1	Faryd Mondragón	27	27	8-8-11	28	1.04	7	Signed	$396,667
(United States)	18	Zac MacMath	8	7	3-0-4	8	1.00	3	SuperDraft	$125,000 (GA)
(Trinidad and Tobago)	24	Thorne Holder	0	0	0-0-0	0	0	0	Signed	$42,000
(United States)	31	Chase Harrison	0	0	0-0-0	0	0	0	Signed	N/A
			35	34	11-8-15	36	1.03	10		

* = Not currently part of team.

|} Updated to match played October 20, 2011
Source: Philadelphia Union

== MLS Cup Playoffs Squad information ==
=== Statistics ===
Statistics are from all MLS Cup Playoffs matches.

Nat	No	Player	Pos	Apps	Starts	G	A	Booked	Sent off (straight red)	Acquired	Salary
(England)	2	Joe Tait	DF	0	0	0	0	0	0	Signed	$42,000
(Colombia)	3	Juan Diego González	DF	0	0	0	0	0	0	Signed	$193,462
(United States)	4	Danny Califf	DF	2	2	0	0	0	0	Signed	$250,000
(Colombia)	5	Carlos Valdés	DF	2	2	0	0	1	0	Signed	$180,000
(Brazil)	6	Stefani Miglioranzi	MF	1	1	0	0	1	0	Expansion Draft	$153,125
(United States)	7	Brian Carroll	MF	2	2	0	0	1	0	Trade	$160,000
(Colombia)	8	Roger Torres	MF	2	0	0	0	0	0	Signed	$108,725
(France)	9	Sébastien Le Toux	FW	2	2	1	0	0	0	Expansion Draft	$179,000
(Democratic Republic of the Congo)	10	Danny Mwanga	FW	1	1	0	0	0	0	SuperDraft	$226,250
(United States)	11	Freddy Adu	MF	2	0	0	0	0	0	Signed	$594,884
(United States)	13	Kyle Nakazawa	MF	0	0	0	0	0	0	SuperDraft	$44,000
(United States)	14	Amobi Okugo	MF	0	0	0	0	0	0	SuperDraft	$168,000
(United States)	15	Gabriel Farfan	MF	2	2	0	0	2	0	Signed	$42,000
(Serbia)	16	Veljko Paunović	FW	1	1	0	0	0	0	Signed	$90,000
(Trinidad and Tobago)	17	Keon Daniel	MF	0	0	0	0	0	0	Signed	$46,410
(United States)	19	Jack McInerney	FW	2	1	0	0	0	0	SuperDraft	$135,417
(United States)	21	Michael Farfan	MF	2	2	0	1	0	0	SuperDraft	$79,500
(United States)	22	Justin Mapp	MF	2	1	0	0	0	0	Trade	$183,333
(United States)	23	Ryan Richter	MF	0	0	0	0	0	0	Supplemental Draft	$32,604
(United States)	25	Sheanon Williams	DF	2	2	0	0	1	0	Signed	$42,000
(United States)	26	Morgan Langley	MF	0	0	0	0	0	0	Signed	N/A
(United States)	27	Zach Pfeffer	MF	0	0	0	0	0	0	Signed	$65,000
						1	1	5	0		

Last updated: November 3, 2011.
Source: Philadelphia Union

=== Goalkeepers ===
Nat	No	Player	Apps	Starts	Record	GA	GAA	SO	Acquired	Salary
(Colombia)	1	Faryd Mondragón	2	2	0-2-0	3	2.00	0	Signed	$396,667
(United States)	18	Zac MacMath	0	0	0-0-0	0	0	0	SuperDraft	$125,000
(Trinidad and Tobago)	24	Thorne Holder	0	0	0-0-0	0	0	0	Signed	$42,000
			2	2	0-2-0	3	1.50	0		

Last updated: November 3, 2011.
Source: Philadelphia Union

== Honors and awards ==
=== MLS Player of the Month ===
Month	Player	Stats
September	(France) Sébastien Le Toux	7G

=== MLS Player of the Week ===
Week	Player	Stats
11	(United States) Justin Mapp	2G (11', 61')

=== MLS Goal of the Week ===
Week	Player	Report
10	(Guatemala) Carlos Ruiz	
18	(Guatemala) Carlos Ruiz	
20	(Colombia) Roger Torres	

=== MLS Team of the Week ===
Week	Player	Report
1	(United States) Danny Califf	
2	(United States) Brian Carroll	
7	(United States) Sheanon Williams (Colombia) Carlos Valdés (Trinidad and Tobago) Keon Daniel	
10	(United States) Justin Mapp	
11	(United States) Justin Mapp	
16	(United States) Sheanon Williams	
18	(France) Sébastien Le Toux (United States) Justin Mapp (Colombia) Carlos Valdés	
28	(United States) Michael Farfan	
29	(France) Sébastien Le Toux (United States) Michael Farfan	

=== MLS All-Stars 2011 ===
Position	Player	Notes
GK	(Colombia) Faryd Mondragón	Hans Backe's Pick

== Player movement ==
=== Transfers ===
==== In ====
Date	Player	Number	Position	Previous club	Fee/notes	Ref
November 22, 2010	(United States) Brian Carroll	7	MF	(United States) Columbus Crew	Acquired for allocation money and a 2nd round SuperDraft pick	
December 22, 2010	(United States) Zach Pfeffer	27	MF	(United States) FC Delco	Signed As Homegrown Player	
January 20, 2011	(Colombia) Faryd Mondragón	1	GK	(Germany) Köln	Undisclosed	
January 20, 2011	(Colombia) Carlos Valdés	5	DF	(Colombia) Santa Fe	Undisclosed	
February 14, 2011	(United States) Chris Agorsor	12	FW	(United States) University of Virginia	Weighted lottery	
February 22, 2011	(Guatemala) Carlos Ruiz	20	FW	(Greece) Aris	Free	
March 1, 2011	(Trinidad and Tobago) Thorne Holder	24	GK	(United States) Adelphi University	Free	
March 1, 2011	(United States) Ryan Richter	23	MF	(United States) La Salle University	Supplemental Draft, 1st round	
March 18, 2011	(Ivory Coast) Levi Houapeu	11	FW	(United States) University of Maryland, Baltimore County	2011 MLS SuperDraft, 3rd round	
March 18, 2011	(Trinidad and Tobago) Keon Daniel	17	MF	Puerto Rico Islanders	Free	
March 18, 2011	(United States) Gabriel Farfan	15	MF	(Mexico) Club América	Free	
June 13, 2011	(Serbia) Veljko Paunović	16	FW	Unattached	Free	
August 12, 2011	(United States) Freddy Adu	11	MF	(Portugal) Benfica	Free, acquired via allocation process	
August 22, 2011	(Trinidad and Tobago) Thorne Holder	24	GK	(United States) F.C. New York	Free	
September 13, 2011	(England) Joe Tait	2	DF	(United States) Dayton Dutch Lions	Free	
September 14, 2011	(United States) Morgan Langley	26	MF	(United States) Harrisburg City Islanders	Free	
September 23, 2011	(United States) Chase Harrison	31	GK	(United States) Harrisburg City Islanders	Free	

==== Out ====
Date	Player	Number	Position	Destination club	Fee/notes	Ref
November 24, 2010	(United States) Shea Salinas	11	MF	(Canada) Vancouver Whitecaps FC	Expansion Draft	
November 24, 2010	(Venezuela) Alejandro Moreno	15	FW	(Canada) Vancouver Whitecaps FC	Expansion Draft	
December 15, 2010	(United States) Chris Seitz	1	GK	(United States) Seattle Sounders FC	Re-Entry Draft	
December 15, 2010	(Brazil) Fred	7	FW	(United States) New England Revolution	Re-Entry Draft	
January 14, 2011	(Finland) Toni Ståhl	12	MF	(United States) Fort Lauderdale Strikers	Contract option declined, free transfer	
January 25, 2011	(United States) Brad Knighton	18	GK	(United States) Carolina RailHawks	Waived, free transfer	
February 8, 2011	(Puerto Rico) Cristian Arrieta	26	DF	(United States) Fort Lauderdale Strikers	Waived, free transfer	
February 14, 2011	(Argentina) Eduardo Coudet	21	MF	(United States) Fort Lauderdale Strikers	Waived, free transfer	
February 18, 2011	(United States) Andrew Jacobson	8	MF	(United States) FC Dallas	Traded for a 2013 SuperDraft 2nd round pick	
March 1, 2011	(United States) Nick Zimmerman	23	MF	(United States) Carolina RailHawks	Waived, free transfer	
March 1, 2011	(United States) J. T. Noone	17	MF	(United States) Harrisburg City Islanders	Waived, free transfer	
March 2, 2011	(United States) Michael Orozco Fiscal	16	DF	(Mexico) San Luis	Loan expired; purchase option declined	
June 2, 2011	(United States) Chris Agorsor	12	FW	(United States) Real Salt Lake	Waived, free transfer	
July 7, 2011	(United States) Jordan Harvey	2	DF	(Canada) Vancouver Whitecaps FC	Traded for allocation money	
July 26, 2011	(Trinidad and Tobago) Thorne Holder	24	GK	(United States) F.C. New York	Waived, free transfer	
August 5, 2011	(Guatemala) Carlos Ruiz	20	FW	(Mexico) Veracruz	Transfer	

=== Loans ===
==== In ====
Date	Player	Number	Position	Loaned from	Fee/notes	Ref
March 8, 2010	(Colombia) Roger Torres	8	MF	(Colombia) América de Cali	Terms undisclosed	

== Miscellany ==
=== Allocation ranking ===
Philadelphia is in the #17 position in the MLS Allocation Ranking. The allocation ranking is the mechanism used to determine which MLS club has first priority to acquire a U.S. national team player who signs with MLS after playing abroad, or a former MLS player who returns to the league after having gone to a club abroad for a transfer fee. Philadelphia started 2011 ranked #5 on the allocation list and used its ranking to acquire Freddy Adu. A ranking can be traded, provided that part of the compensation received in return is another club's ranking.

=== International roster spots ===
Philadelphia has 8 international roster spots. Each club in Major League Soccer is allocated 8 international roster spots, which can be traded. Philadelphia has not dealt or acquired any spots in trades. There is no limit on the number of international slots on each club's roster. The remaining roster slots must belong to domestic players. For clubs based in the United States, a domestic player is either a U.S. citizen, a permanent resident (green card holder) or the holder of other special status (e.g., refugee or asylum status).

=== Future draft pick trades ===
Future picks acquired: 2012 SuperDraft Round 2 pick acquired from Sporting Kansas City; 2013 SuperDraft Round 2 pick acquired from FC Dallas.
Future picks traded: None.
