= Brendan Burke (soccer) =

American soccer coach

Personal information
- Full name: Brendan Burke
- Date of birth: November 12, 1982 (age 43)
- Place of birth: Hopedale, Massachusetts, United States
- Height: 6 ft 3 in (1.91 m)
- Position: Defender

Team information
- Current team: Hartford Athletic (head coach)

College career
Years	Team	Apps	(Gls)
2001–2005	Boston College Eagles		

Senior career*
Years	Team	Apps	(Gls)
2003	Worcester Kings	10	(3)
2004–2005	Cape Cod Crusaders	11	(0)
2006	Sligo Rovers	0	(0)
2007	Reading United	13	(1)

Managerial career
- 2008–2013: Reading United
- 2011–2012: Philadelphia Union Reserves
- 2011–2013: Philadelphia Union (assistant)
- 2014–2015: Northeastern Huskies (associate)
- 2015–2019: Bethlehem Steel
- 2021–2022: Colorado Springs Switchbacks
- 2023: Houston Dynamo (assistant)
- 2024–: Hartford Athletic
- * Club domestic league appearances and goals

Brendan Burke (born November 12, 1982, in Hopedale, Massachusetts) is an American soccer coach and former player who is currently the head coach for USL Championship club Hartford Athletic. During his playing career, he mainly played as a center back for several teams in the Premier Development League before beginning his head coaching career at age 25 for Reading United where he was very successful.

== Player ==
Born in Hopedale, Massachusetts 1982, Burke later graduated from Saint John's High School in Shrewsbury in 2001. In his senior year, he scored 16 goals and 17 assists and was named the 2000 Central Massachusetts Player of the Year. He then attended Boston College where he played sparingly until his senior year in 2005, when he played 12 games. During his college years, he first played for Worcester Kings for whom he scored his first goal in a 4–1 loss against Brooklyn Knights on June 25, 2003. in the Premier Development League. He would later play for the Cape Cod Crusaders also in the Premier Development League.

After his graduation, he had a brief stint with Sligo Rovers in League of Ireland Premier Division before returning to play in the Premier Development League with Reading United in 2007. It would be his last season as a player before he embarked on his coaching career.

== Coach ==
=== Reading United and Philadelphia Union Reserves ===
In 2008, Burke began his coaching career at age 25 for Reading United in the Premier Development League as part of his six-year reign with the team. He led the team to a 1st-place finish in the Mid Atlantic Division with an 11–3–2 regular season record. In the playoffs, his team reached the League Semi-Final before losing to Laredo Heat.

In 2009, he led the team to another Mid Atlantic Division first place regular season finish with its 13–1–2 record, which was also the best regular season record in the entire league. In the playoffs, his team lost its opening round game against Cary Clarets in the Division Final.

In 2010, Burke once again led his team to a Mid Atlantic first place regular season with a 10–2–4 record. In the playoffs, the team ended up placing 4th overall in the league after losing to Baton Rouge Capitals in a penalty kick tiebreaker.

In 2011, Burke kept his Reading United coaching position while joining the team's Major League Soccer affiliate, Philadelphia Union. He would be the head coach of the Philadelphia Union Reserves as well as serving as an assistant coach of the first team. His appointment made him the youngest assistant coach in Major League Soccer when he joined the Union. In his debut as the Philadelphia Union Reserves coach in 2011, the team finished 2–7–1 in last place in the Eastern Division. For his season with Reading United, the team finished 12–2–2 and came in 2nd place in the Mid-Atlantic Division while losing to Jersey Express in the Division Qualification game for the playoffs.

In 2012 which was the last season of the MLS Reserve League, his Philadelphia Union Reserves finished 4–4–2 for 3rd place in the Eastern Division. He would also lead Reading United to an 11–3–2 regular season record that was good for 2nd place in the Mid Atlantic Division. In the playoffs, the team was ousted by Carolina Dynamo in the Eastern Conference Semi-Final.

In his final season with Reading United in 2013, Burke led the team to a 3rd-place finish in the Mid Atlantic Division with an 8–5–1 record. In the playoffs, the team was again ousted in the Eastern Conference Semi-Final - this time by Ottawa Fury.

=== Northeastern Huskies ===
In early 2014, Burke left his positions with Philadelphia Union and Reading United to pursue coaching opportunities closer to his native Massachusetts. On April 14, 2014, he would take the position of Associate head coach of the men's soccer team at Northeastern University. He would remain in that position until October 29.

=== Bethlehem Steel FC ===
2015 when he became the first head coach of Bethlehem Steel FC, the reserve team owned and operated by the Philadelphia Union that competed in the United Soccer League. The Steel finished the first season missing out on the playoffs but gave ample playing time to young players from the academy.

Ahead of the 2018 season, Burke's contract option was picked up and signed a multi-year extension to continue coaching Steel FC. The 2018 season was the most successful to date with Burke's club winning its first postseason match, earning its highest seeding and setting single season records for wins (14) and goals (58).

Prior to the start of the 2020 season, the club re-branded as Philadelphia Union II and announced that Burke had transitioned to Head of Recruitment Operations for Union II and the first team, being succeeded by Sven Gartung as head coach.

=== Colorado Springs Switchbacks FC ===
In December 2020, it was announced that Burke was appointed head coach of Colorado Springs Switchbacks FC in the USL Championship. In 2021, his first season with the club, he brought the Switchbacks to the playoffs for the first time since 2016 and a 5th-place finish overall in the Western Conference. Burke was named a 2021 USL Championship Coach of the Year Finalist for his efforts. Burke left Colorado Springs in January 2023.

=== Houston Dynamo FC ===
Burke joined the coaching staff of Major League Soccer club Houston Dynamo on January 13, 2023.

=== Hartford Athletic ===
Burke was appointed Head Coach and General Manager of Hartford Athletic on December 12, 2023. In the 2025 season, Burke led Hartford to a 1-0 victory over Sacramento Republic FC to win the 2025 USL Cup. This was the first major trophy in club history and his first title as a manager. In the 2026 season, Burke surpassed 100 wins in the USL Championship. On June 17, 2026, the club announced that Burke had signed a three-year contract extension.

== Coaching record ==
As of June 25, 2026

Team	From	To	Record				
Team	From	To	G	W	L	T	Win %
Reading United; Philadelphia Union Reserves	2008	2013	108	71	18	19	65.74
Northeastern Huskies	2013	2014	20	8	11	1	40.00
Bethlehem Steel FC	2015	2020	133	41	59	33	30.83
Colorado Springs Switchbacks FC	2021	2022	56	26	11	19	46.43
Hartford Athletic	2024	Present	75	31	29	15	41.33
Total			392	177	128	87	45.15

Note: Includes all competitive USL and playoff matches. Playoff matches decided by penalties officially recorded as draws.

== Honors ==
=== Manager ===
Hartford Athletic

- USL Cup: 2025
