= Chase Harrison =

American soccer player

Personal information
- Full name: Karry Chase Harrison
- Date of birth: April 2, 1984 (age 42)
- Place of birth: Huntington, West Virginia
- Height: 6 ft 3 in (1.91 m)
- Position: Goalkeeper

College career
Years	Team	Apps	(Gls)
2002–2005	Virginia Tech Hokies	79	(0)

Senior career*
Years	Team	Apps	(Gls)
2004	West Virginia Chaos		
2006	Real Salt Lake	0	(0)
2006	→ Virginia Beach Mariners (loan)	2	(0)
2007–2008	Rochester Rhinos	18	(0)
2008	Portland Timbers	6	(0)
2009	Harrisburg City Islanders	16	(0)
2010	Crystal Palace Baltimore	2	(0)
2010	→ Richmond Kickers (loan)	2	(0)
2010	D.C. United	0	(0)
2010	Columbus Crew	0	(0)
2011	Harrisburg City Islanders	23	(0)
2011–2012	Philadelphia Union	1	(0)
- * Club domestic league appearances and goals as of February 21, 2012

Chase Harrison (born April 2, 1984) is an American former professional soccer player who played as a goalkeeper.

== Career ==
=== College and amateur ===
Harrison attended Huntington High School and played college soccer at Virginia Tech from 2002 to 2005. In four seasons he appeared in 79 matches, registering 289 saves, 24 shutouts, and a GAA of 1.12. During his college years he also played with the West Virginia Chaos in the USL Premier Development League.

=== Professional ===
Harrison was drafted in the third round (26th overall) of the 2006 MLS Supplemental Draft by Real Salt Lake. He was loaned to the Virginia Beach Mariners in March 2006, and played two games for the team, before being waived by RSL at the end of the 2006 season without playing a senior game.

He signed for Rochester Raging Rhinos in May 2007. On July 9, 2008, the Rhinos sent Harrison and Jamil Walker, recently acquired from the Carolina RailHawks, to the Portland Timbers in exchange for Andrew Gregor.

Harrison signed for Harrisburg City Islanders in March 2009. On February 18, 2010 Crystal Palace Baltimore announced the signing of Harrison to a contract for the 2010 season.

On September 9, 2010, Harrison was added to the D.C. United roster following the release of Andrew Quinn, who underwent knee surgery. On October 26, the Columbus Crew signed Harrison to a short-term contract to backup Andy Gruenebaum in the postseason after starting goalkeeper William Hesmer suffered a right shoulder fracture.

Harrison signed with Harrisburg City Islanders, now playing in the USL Pro league, on March 16, 2011.

Harrison was signed by Philadelphia Union on September 23, 2011, to replace injured goalkeeper Thorne Holder as a backup. At season's end, the club declined his 2012 contract option and he entered the 2011 MLS Re-Entry Draft. Harrison was not selected in the draft and became a free agent; however, Philadelphia re-signed him just before the start of the 2012 season.

Harrison remained with Philadelphia through the 2012 season. After the conclusion of the 2012 season, Philadelphia declined the 2013 option on Harrison's contract and he entered the 2012 MLS Re-Entry Draft. He became a free agent after going undrafted in both rounds of the draft.
