= 2012 MLS All-Star Game =

Soccer game played in Chester, Pennsylvania

AT&T MLS All-Star Game 2012
- Event: 2012 Major League Soccer season
MLS All-Stars	Chelsea
(United States) (Canada)	(England)
3	2
- Date: July 25, 2012
- Venue: PPL Park, Chester, Pennsylvania
- Most Valuable Player: Chris Pontius (MLS All-Stars)
- Referee: Baldomero Toledo
- Attendance: 19,236

The 2012 Major League Soccer All-Star Game, held on July 25, 2012, was the 17th annual Major League Soccer All-Star Game, a soccer match involving all-stars from Major League Soccer. The game was played at PPL Park, now known as Subaru Park, in Chester, Pennsylvania, the first time an all-star event was played in the Philadelphia area since the 2002 NBA All-Star Game.

The game featured the MLS All-Stars against Premier League team Chelsea, who were the FA Cup and European Champions League holders. Chelsea made their 2nd appearance in the MLS All-Star Game; the Blues were visiting side in the 2006 MLS All-Star Game at Toyota Park in Bridgeview, Illinois, losing to the MLS XI 1–0.

Piotr Nowak, the coach of the Philadelphia Union (the All-Star Game's host), was originally announced to coach the MLS All-Stars. After Nowak was dismissed from the Union on June 13, MLS chose D.C. United coach and Pennsylvania native Ben Olsen to coach the All-Stars.

A tracking system was worn by each player to monitor heart rate, intensity of play, speed, distance covered and other personal characteristics in real-time.

== Rosters ==
=== MLS All-Stars ===
Note: Flags indicate national team as defined under FIFA eligibility rules; some limited exceptions apply. Players may hold more than one non-FIFA nationality.

No.	Pos.	Nation	Player
1	GK	DEN	Jimmy Nielsen (Sporting Kansas City)
2	DF	COL	Carlos Valdés (Philadelphia Union) ♦
5	MF	USA	Kyle Beckerman (Real Salt Lake)
6	DF	USA	Jay DeMerit (Vancouver Whitecaps FC)
7	MF	CAN	Dwayne De Rosario (D.C. United) (Captain)
8	FW	USA	Chris Wondolowski (San Jose Earthquakes)
9	FW	USA	Eddie Johnson (Seattle Sounders FC)
10	MF	USA	Landon Donovan (LA Galaxy)
11	MF	USA	Graham Zusi (Sporting Kansas City)
12	DF	USA	Ramiro Corrales (San Jose Earthquakes) ♦
13	FW	USA	Chris Pontius (D.C. United)
14	FW	FRA	Thierry Henry (New York Red Bulls)
15	DF	USA	Justin Morrow (San Jose Earthquakes) **
16	MF	CUB	Osvaldo Alonso (Seattle Sounders FC)
21	MF	USA	Michael Farfan (Philadelphia Union) %
22	GK	USA	Dan Kennedy (Chivas USA)

No.	Pos.	Nation	Player
23	MF	ENG	David Beckham (LA Galaxy)
33	DF	IRI	Steven Beitashour (San Jose Earthquakes)
78	DF	FRA	Aurélien Collin (Sporting Kansas City)
00	GK	USA	Nick Rimando (Real Salt Lake) ♥
00	GK	USA	Jon Busch (San Jose Earthquakes) ♥
00	DF	COL	Jamison Olave (Real Salt Lake) ♥
00	DF	USA	Geoff Cameron (Houston Dynamo) ♥
00	MF	USA	Brad Davis (Houston Dynamo) ♥
00	MF	GUA	Marco Pappa (Chicago Fire) ♥
00	MF	USA	Brek Shea (FC Dallas) ♥
00	MF	HON	Roger Espinoza (Sporting Kansas City) ♥
00	MF	HON	Marvin Chavez (San Jose Earthquakes) ♥
00	FW	USA	Kenny Cooper (New York Red Bulls) ♥
00	FW	ARG	Fabian Espindola (Real Salt Lake) ♥
00	FW	SLE	Kei Kamara (Sporting Kansas City) ♥
00	FW	COL	Fredy Montero (Seattle Sounders FC) ♥

♦ - Players selected by MLS Commissioner Don Garber
* - Injured and unavailable for matchday
** - Added as a replacement for Heath Pearce
% - Promoted from the Inactive Roster to the Active Roster to fulfill Chelsea's request that the number of substitutes be increased from seven to ten.
♥ - "Inactive Roster" players voted for by other players in MLS

=== Chelsea ===
Note: Flags indicate national team as defined under FIFA eligibility rules; some limited exceptions apply. Players may hold more than one non-FIFA nationality.

No.	Pos.	Nation	Player
1	GK	CZE	Petr Čech (third captain)
2	DF	SRB	Branislav Ivanović
3	DF	ENG	Ashley Cole
4	DF	BRA	David Luiz
5	MF	GHA	Michael Essien
7	MF	BRA	Ramires
8	MF	ENG	Frank Lampard (vice-captain)
9	FW	ESP	Fernando Torres
12	MF	NGR	Mikel John Obi
14	MF	BEL	Kevin De Bruyne
15	MF	FRA	Florent Malouda
16	MF	POR	Raul Meireles
17	MF	BEL	Eden Hazard
18	FW	BEL	Romelu Lukaku

No.	Pos.	Nation	Player
19	DF	POR	Paulo Ferreira
20	MF	ENG	Josh McEachran
21	MF	GER	Marko Marin
22	GK	ENG	Ross Turnbull
24	DF	ENG	Gary Cahill
26	DF	ENG	John Terry (club captain)
27	DF	ENG	Sam Hutchinson
30	MF	ISR	Yossi Benayoun
31	MF	FRA	Gaël Kakuta
35	FW	BRA	Lucas Piazon
40	GK	POR	Henrique Hilário
45	DF	ENG	Nathaniel Chalobah
46	GK	ENG	Jamal Blackman

== Match ==
=== Details ===
2012 MLS All-Star Game
July 25, 2012
8:30 p.m. EDT

MLS All-Stars (United States) (Canada)	3–2	(England) Chelsea
Wondolowski 21'; Pontius 73'; Johnson 90+1'	Report	Terry 32'; Lampard 58'

PPL Park, Chester, Pennsylvania
Attendance: 19,236
Referee: Baldomero Toledo

MLS All-Stars	Chelsea

GK	1	(Denmark) Jimmy Nielsen	(substituted off) 45'
RB	33	(Iran) Steven Beitashour
CB	6	(United States) Jay DeMerit
CB	78	(France) Aurélien Collin	(substituted off) 36'
LB	15	(United States) Justin Morrow	(substituted off) 56'
DM	16	(Cuba) Osvaldo Alonso	(substituted off) 56'
AM	7	(Canada) Dwayne De Rosario (c)
RM	23	(England) David Beckham	(substituted off) 74'
LM	10	(United States) Landon Donovan	(substituted off) 45'
CF	14	(France) Thierry Henry	(substituted off) 57'
CF	8	(United States) Chris Wondolowski	(substituted off) 60' (goal) 21'
Substitutes:
DF	2	(Colombia) Carlos Valdés	(substituted on) 36'
GK	22	(United States) Dan Kennedy	(substituted on) 45'
MF	13	(United States) Chris Pontius	(substituted on) 45' (goal) 73'
MF	5	(United States) Kyle Beckerman	(substituted on) 56'
MF	11	(United States) Graham Zusi	(substituted on) 57'
DF	12	(United States) Ramiro Corrales	(substituted on) 57'
FW	9	(United States) Eddie Johnson	(substituted on) 60' (goal) 90+1'
MF	21	(United States) Michael Farfan	(substituted on) 74'
Manager:
(United States) Ben Olsen

GK	40	(Portugal) Henrique Hilário	(substituted off) 45'
RB	2	(Serbia) Branislav Ivanović
CB	26	(England) John Terry (c)	(substituted off) 45' (goal) 32'
CB	24	(England) Gary Cahill	(substituted off) 76'
LB	3	(England) Ashley Cole	(substituted off) 45'
DM	5	(Ghana) Michael Essien	(substituted off) 61'
CM	7	(Brazil) Ramires	(substituted off) 61'
CM	8	(England) Frank Lampard	(substituted off) 61' (goal) 58'
MF	30	(Israel) Yossi Benayoun	(substituted off) 45'
MF	21	(Germany) Marko Marin	(substituted off) 61'
CF	18	(Belgium) Romelu Lukaku	(substituted off) 75'
Substitutes:
GK	22	(England) Ross Turnbull	(substituted on) 45'
MF	19	(Portugal) Paulo Ferreira	(substituted on) 45'
MF	15	(France) Florent Malouda	(substituted on) 45'
DF	4	(Brazil) David Luiz	(substituted on) 45'
MF	17	(Belgium) Eden Hazard	(substituted on) 61'
MF	12	(Nigeria) Mikel John Obi	(substituted on) 61'
MF	16	(Portugal) Raul Meireles	(substituted on) 61'
FW	35	(Brazil) Lucas Piazon	(substituted on) 61'
MF	14	(Belgium) Kevin De Bruyne	(substituted on) 75'
DF	45	(England) Nathaniel Chalobah	(substituted on) 76'
Manager:
(Italy) Roberto Di Matteo

Volkswagen MLS All-Star MVP:
(United States) Chris Pontius (MLS All-Stars)
Assistant referees:
(Ian Anderson)
(Greg Barkey)
Fourth official:
(Jorge González)

Match rules

- 90 minutes.
- No extra time
- Penalty shoot-out if scores still level.
- Maximum of ten substitutions.
