= Gabriel Farfán =

American soccer player

Personal information
- Full name: Gabriel Farfán Stopani
- Date of birth: June 23, 1988 (age 38)
- Place of birth: San Diego, California, United States
- Height: 5 ft 9 in (1.75 m)
- Positions: Midfielder; left-back

Youth career
- 2003–2005: IMG Soccer Academy
- 2006–2007: Cal State Fullerton Titans
- 2008–2010: América

Senior career*
Years	Team	Apps	(Gls)
2006	Orange County Blue Star	1	(0)
2007–2008	Ventura County Fusion	20	(3)
2009	Los Angeles Legends	9	(1)
2011–2013	Philadelphia Union	51	(1)
2013–2014	Chivas USA	14	(0)
2014	→ Chiapas (loan)	3	(0)
2014–2016	Chiapas	11	(1)
2016	→ New York Cosmos (loan)	4	(1)
2016–2018	Miami FC	23	(1)

International career^{‡}
2003–2005	United States U17	9	(0)
- * Club domestic league appearances and goals as of 11:43, 30 October 2017 (UTC) ‡ National team caps and goals as of October 25, 2012

Gabriel Farfán Stopani (born June 23, 1988, in San Diego, California) is an American former professional soccer player who played for clubs such as Philadelphia Union, Chivas USA, Chiapas F.C. and New York Cosmos.

== Career ==
=== Youth and college ===
Played youth club soccer in Southern California where he captured numerous team titles, including the 2002 national championship. He also played in the Youth World Championships in Japan in 2000 in the Mexico national team. In 2004, he joined IMG Soccer Academy and remained there until enrolling at California State University, Fullerton in the Spring of 2006. After two years with the CSUF Titans in which he played with his twin brother Michael Farfan, he joined the youth system of Mexico's Club América. He remained at Club América for two years before returning to the United States.

During his college years Farfan also played extensively in the USL Premier Development League, for Orange County Blue Star, Ventura County Fusion and the Los Angeles Legends.

=== Professional ===
After trialling with the club during the 2011 MLS pre-season, Farfan signed with Philadelphia Union in March, 2011 He made his professional debut in Philadelphia's opening game of the 2011 MLS season, a 1–0 win over Houston Dynamo. Farfan scored his first professional goal on May 28, 2011, in a comprehensive 6–2 victory over Toronto FC.

Farfan was traded to Chivas USA in 2013 in exchange for a 2014 MLS SuperDraft first-round pick. Farfan was loaned to Chiapas in early 2014 and later was sold to the Mexican club.

On July 1, 2016, Farfán signed with Miami FC.

On April 21, 2018, Farfán made posts on social media announcing his retirement from professional soccer.

=== International ===
Farfan was a member of the United States U-17 and played in the 2005 Youth World Cup.

== Career statistics ==
=== Club ===
Club performance			League		Cup		League Cup		Continental		Total	
Season	Club	League	Apps	Goals	Apps	Goals	Apps	Goals	Apps	Goals	Apps	Goals
USA			League		Open Cup		League Cup		North America		Total	
2011	Philadelphia Union	Major League Soccer	22	1	0	0	2	0	0	0	24	1
2012	Philadelphia Union	Major League Soccer	23	0	4	0	0	0	0	0	27	0
2013	Philadelphia Union	Major League Soccer	6	0	0	0	0	0	0	0	6	0
2013	Chivas USA	Major League Soccer	14	0	2	0	0	0	0	0	16	0
Mexico			League		Copa MX		League Cup		North America		Total	
2013–14	Chiapas (loan)	Liga MX	3	0	2	0	-	-	-	-	5	0
2014–15	Chiapas	Liga MX	4	0	9	0	-	-	-	-	13	0
Total	USA		65	1	6	0	2	0	0	0	73	1
Total	Mexico		7	0	11	0	0	0	0	0	18	0
Career total			72	1	17	0	2	0	0	0	91	1

Updated April 28, 2015

== Personal ==
Gabriel's twin brother, Michael Farfan, is another former professional soccer player who retired in February 2017. The two were teammates from 2011 to 2013 with the Philadelphia Union.
