= Kyle Nakazawa =

American soccer player (born 1988)

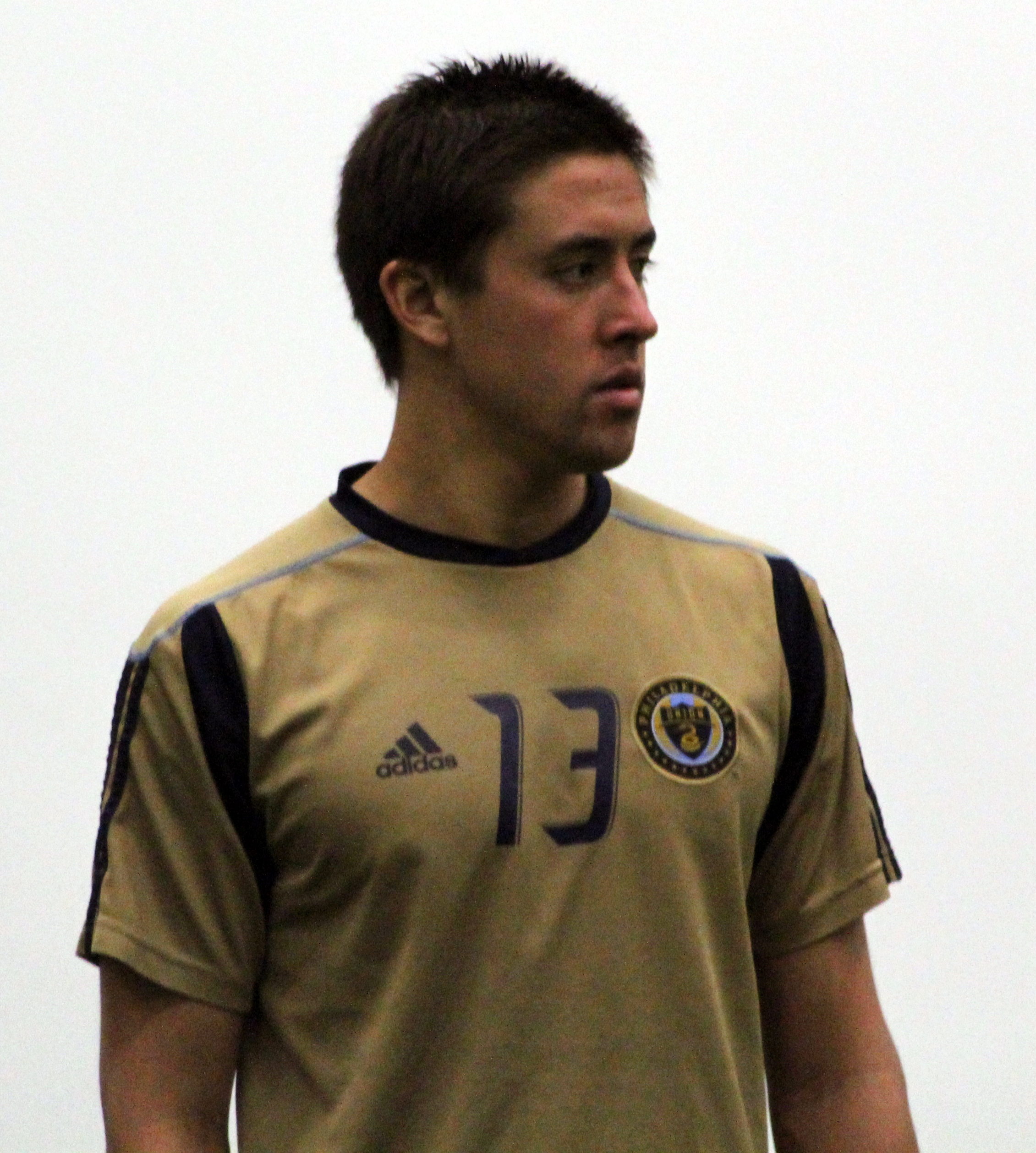
- Nakazawa during 2011 preseason training with the Union

Personal information
- Date of birth: March 16, 1988 (age 38)
- Place of birth: Torrance, California, United States
- Height: 5 ft 11 in (1.80 m)
- Position: Midfielder

Youth career
- 2003–2006: Irvine Strikes
- 2006–2009: UCLA Bruins

Senior career*
Years	Team	Apps	(Gls)
2007	San Fernando Valley Quakes	2	(0)
2009	Los Angeles Legends	7	(1)
2010–2011	Philadelphia Union	36	(1)
2012	Los Angeles Galaxy	5	(0)
Total		50	(2)

International career
2005	United States U17	4	(2)
- * Club domestic league appearances and goals

Kyle 'Marbles' Nakazawa (born March 16, 1988) is an American retired professional soccer player who played as a midfielder.

== Club career ==
=== College and amateur ===
Born in Torrance, California, Nakazawa grew up in Rancho Palos Verdes, California, and attended Palos Verdes Peninsula High School from 2002 to 2003, before moving to the Edison Academic Center from 2003 to 2005 where he was a part of the U.S. U-17 residency program. Nakazawa played college soccer at UCLA from 2006 to 2009; he was named to the 2006 Soccer America and Top Drawer Soccer All-Freshman first teams and College Soccer News' All-Freshman second team, was a 2007 Second-team All-Pac-10 selection and UCLA Bruins MVP, and was a 2009 First-team NSCAA All-American, an All-Far West selection, a First-team All-Pac-10 selection, and a Pac-10 All-Academic honoree. He played club soccer for the Irvine Strikers.

During his college years he also appeared for both the San Fernando Valley Quakes and the Los Angeles Legends in the USL Premier Development League.

=== Professional ===
Nakazawa was drafted in the third round (33rd overall) of the 2010 MLS SuperDraft by Philadelphia Union. Known for providing a steady presence in the midfield and excellent service balls, he made his professional debut on May 1, 2010, in a match at Los Angeles Galaxy. Nakazawa made his first professional start on May 8, 2010, at Real Salt Lake, and he scored his first professional goal on May 28, 2011, in the Union's 6–2 victory over Toronto FC.

On February 1, 2012, Nakazawa was traded to Los Angeles Galaxy with a 2013 MLS SuperDraft second round pick for a 2012 international roster slot.

On January 21, 2013, Los Angeles Galaxy head coach Bruce Arena announced that Nakazawa had retired from playing professional soccer.

== International career ==
Nakazawa was present at the 2005 FIFA U-17 World Cup at Peru, scoring 2 goals.

== Personal life ==
Nakazawa has also dabbled in acting, and he was featured in JoJo’s music video for her 2006 hit song, Too Little Too Late alongside several of his UCLA Bruins teammates.

Kyle is now a U.S. Forest Service firefighter for the Arroyo Grande Hotshots in Arroyo Grande, California.

== Career statistics ==
=== Club ===
Appearances and goals by club, season and competition
Club	Season	League			Open Cup		League Cup		North America		Total	
Club	Season	Division	Apps	Goals	Apps	Goals	Apps	Goals	Apps	Goals	Apps	Goals
Philadelphia Union	2010	Major League Soccer	14	0	0	0	0	0	0	0	14	0
Philadelphia Union	2011	Major League Soccer	22	1	1	0	0	0	0	0	23	1
Philadelphia Union	Total		36	1	1	0	0	0	0	0	37	1
Los Angeles Galaxy	2012	Major League Soccer	2	0	0	0	0	0	0	0	0	0
Career total			38	1	1	0	0	0	0	0	39	1

== See also ==
- History of the Japanese in Los Angeles
