= Carlos Valdés (footballer) =

Colombian footballer (born 1985)

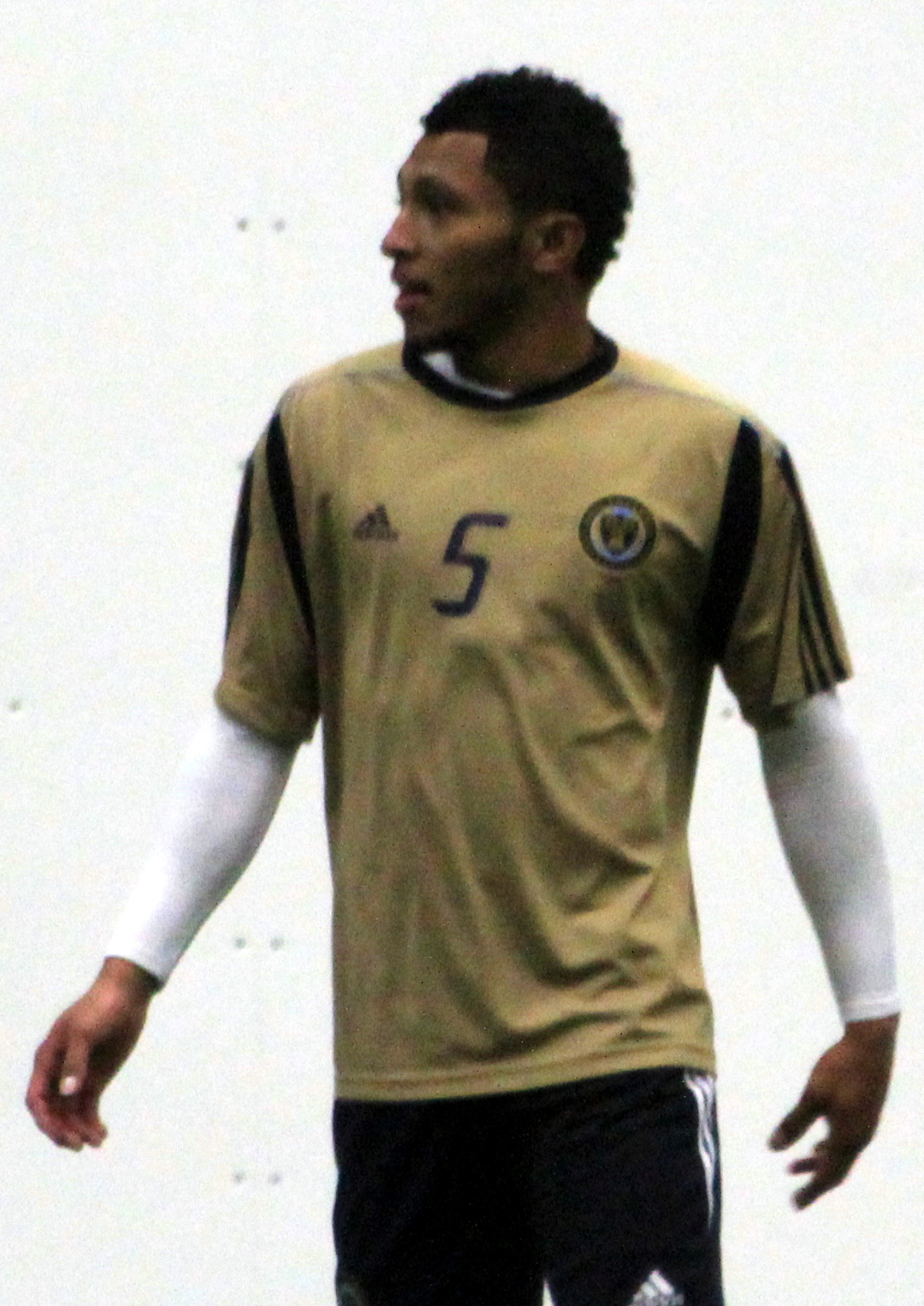
- Valdés participating in preseason training

Personal information
- Full name: Carlos Enrique Valdés Parra
- Date of birth: 22 May 1985 (age 41)
- Place of birth: Cali, Colombia
- Height: 1.85 m (6 ft 1 in)
- Position: Defender

Senior career*
| Years | Team | Apps | (Gls) |
| 2005 | Real Cartagena | 33 | (0) |
| 2006–2009 | América de Cali | 97 | (4) |
| 2009–2010 | Santa Fe | 56 | (1) |
| 2011–2015 | Philadelphia Union | 75 | (3) |
| 2013 | → Santa Fe (loan) | 32 | (4) |
| 2014 | → San Lorenzo (loan) | 7 | (0) |
| 2015 | → Nacional (loan) | 8 | (0) |
| 2015–2016 | Santa Fe | 2 | (0) |

International career
| 2005–2006 | Colombia U20 | 6 | (0) |
| 2008–2015 | Colombia | 17 | (2) |
- * Club domestic league appearances and goals

Carlos Enrique Valdés Parra (born 22 May 1985) is a Colombian former professional footballer who played as a defender.

== Club career ==
=== Colombia ===
Valdés began his career in 2005 with Real Cartagena and appeared in 33 league matches. After impressing with Cartagena, Valdés joined storied Colombian club América de Cali the following campaign and was a stalwart in defense for the club for four years, where he appeared in 97 matches and scored 4 goals. In 2009, he joined Independiente Santa Fe and continued to be one of the top defenders in Colombia.

=== United States ===
On 20 January 2011, Valdés officially joined Major League Soccer side Philadelphia Union on a one-year loan deal. He made his debut for the Union on 19 March 2011, in the team's season opener for the 2011 MLS season, a 1–0 victory over Houston Dynamo. In Week 7 of the season, Valdés was named to the MLS Team of the Week for his performance against the San Jose Earthquakes. On 5 August 2011, the Union announced that it had secured the full rights to Valdes from his former club, Independiente Santa Fe of the Colombian First Division.

==== Loans ====
Seeking to increase his national team prospects, Valdés returned to Santa Fe on loan in 2013 and later joined San Lorenzo de Almagro of the Primera Division Argentina on another loan He briefly returned to Philadelphia following the 2014 World Cup before being loaned to Club Nacional de Football of Uruguay in 2015. He and Philadelphia terminated his deal in 2015.

==== Atlético Socopó ====
In 2017, after a year-long injury, Valdés is signed by Venezuelan club Atlético Socopó, who is going to play in the first division for the first time.

== International career ==
Valdés played with the Colombia U-20 squad at the 2005 South American Youth Championship, which Colombia hosted and won. He then competed at the 2005 FIFA World Youth Championship in the Netherlands, helping Colombia to the Round of 16 before losing to the eventual champions, Argentina. In 2008, he made his debut for the Colombian senior national team.

The 13 May 2014 was included by coach Jose Pekerman in the preliminary list of 30 players for the World Cup of 2014.13 14 Finally, he was selected in the final 23-man roster on 2 June.

== Career statistics ==
=== Club ===
Appearances and goals by club, season and competition
| Club | Season | League | | | National cup (Note: Includes Lamar Hunt U.S. Open Cup.) | | League cup | | Continental | | Total | |
| Club | Season | Division | Apps | Goals | Apps | Goals | Apps | Goals | Apps | Goals | Apps | Goals |
|---|---|---|---|---|---|---|---|---|---|---|---|---|
| Real Cartagena | 2005 | Categoría Primera A | 33 | 0 | 0 | 0 | 0 | 0 | 0 | 0 | 33 | 0 |
| América de Cali | 2006 | Categoría Primera A | 12 | 0 | 0 | 0 | 0 | 0 | 0 | 0 | 12 | 0 |
| América de Cali | 2007 | Categoría Primera A | 31 | 1 | 0 | 0 | 0 | 0 | 0 | 0 | 31 | 1 |
| América de Cali | 2008 | Categoría Primera A | 42 | 1 | 0 | 0 | 0 | 0 | 6 | 0 | 48 | 1 |
| América de Cali | 2009 | Categoría Primera A | 12 | 2 | 0 | 0 | 0 | 0 | 4 | 0 | 16 | 2 |
| América de Cali | Total | | 97 | 4 | 0 | 0 | 0 | 0 | 10 | 0 | 107 | 4 |
| Santa Fe | 2009 | Categoría Primera A | 22 | 1 | 0 | 0 | 0 | 0 | 0 | 0 | 22 | 1 |
| Santa Fe | 2010 | Categoría Primera A | 32 | 0 | 0 | 0 | 0 | 0 | 5 | 0 | 37 | 0 |
| Santa Fe | Total | | 54 | 1 | 0 | 0 | 0 | 0 | 5 | 0 | 59 | 1 |
| Philadelphia Union | 2011 | Major League Soccer | 32 | 1 | 1 | 0 | 2 | 0 | 0 | 0 | 35 | 1 |
| Philadelphia Union | 2012 | Major League Soccer | 33 | 2 | 2 | 0 | 0 | 0 | 0 | 0 | 35 | 2 |
| Philadelphia Union | Total | | 65 | 3 | 3 | 0 | 2 | 0 | 0 | 0 | 70 | 3 |
| Santa Fe (loan) | 2013 | Categoría Primera A | 32 | 4 | 1 | 1 | 0 | 0 | 10 | 0 | 43 | 5 |
| San Lorenzo (loan) | 2014 | Primera División | 7 | 0 | 0 | 0 | 0 | 0 | 7 | 0 | 14 | 0 |
| Career total | | | 288 | 11 | 4 | 1 | 2 | 0 | 32 | 0 | 326 | 12 |

=== International ===
Appearances and goals by national team and year
| National team | Year | Apps | Goals |
|---|---|---|---|
| Colombia | 2008 | 1 | 0 |
| Colombia | 2009 | 0 | 0 |
| Colombia | 2010 | 3 | 1 |
| Colombia | 2011 | 0 | 0 |
| Colombia | 2012 | 2 | 0 |
| Colombia | 2013 | 6 | 1 |
| Colombia | 2014 | 4 | 0 |
| Colombia | 2015 | 1 | 0 |
| Total | | 17 | 2 |

Scores and results list Colombia's goal tally first.

| # | Date | Venue | Opponent | Score | Final | Competition |
|---|---|---|---|---|---|---|
| 1. | 30 May 2010 | Stadium mk, Milton Keynes, England | Nigeria | 1–0 | 1–1 | Friendly |
| 2. | 22 March 2013 | Estadio Metropolitano Roberto Meléndez, Barranquilla, Colombia | Bolivia | 2–0 | 5–0 | 2014 FIFA World Cup qualification |

== Honours ==
América de Cali

- Categoría Primera A: 2008-II

Independiente Santa Fe

- Copa Colombia: 2009
- Superliga Colombiana: 2013

San Lorenzo

- Copa Libertadores: 2014

Individual

- Major League Soccer All-Star Team: 2012
