= Zac MacMath =

American soccer player

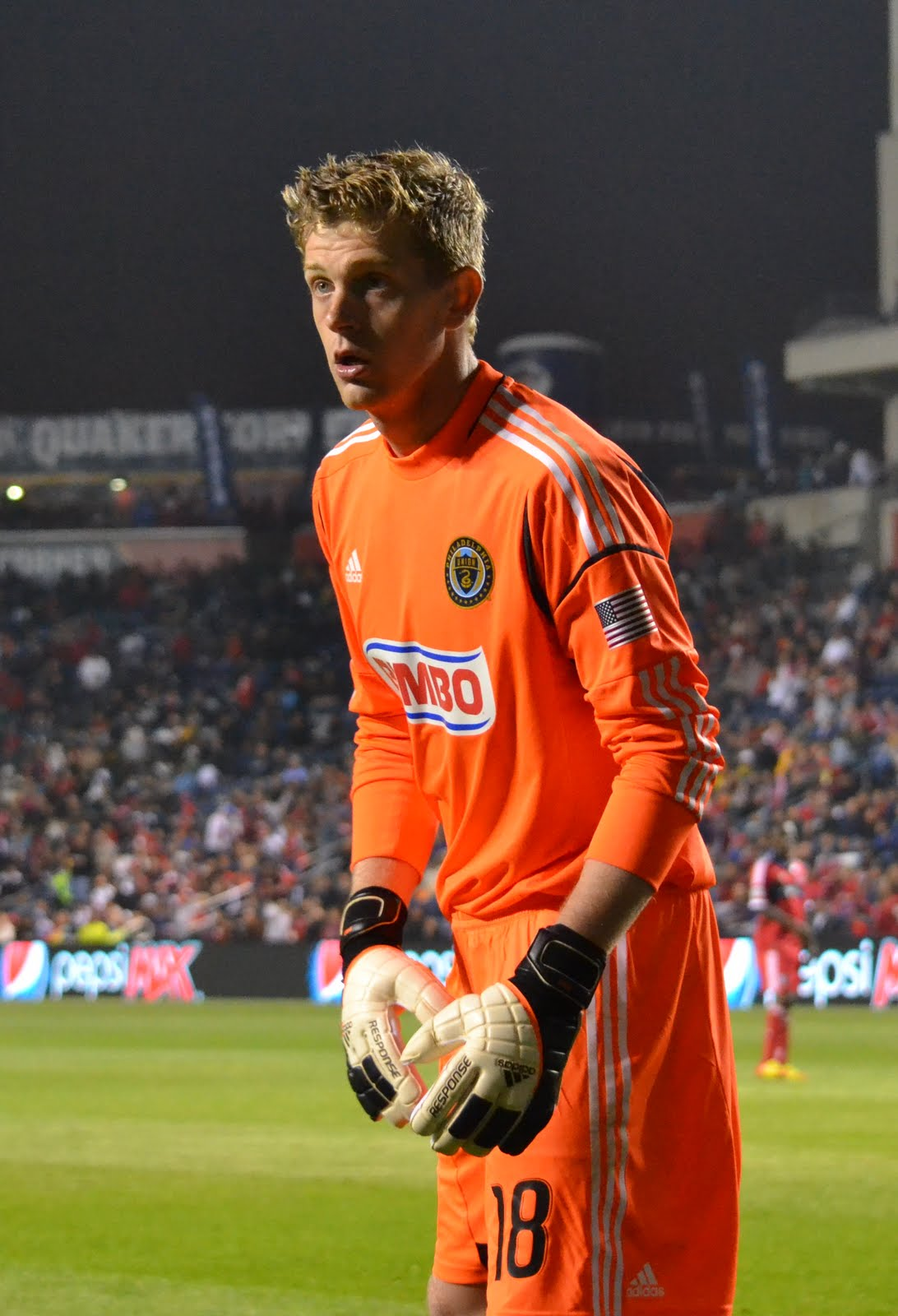
- MacMath with Philadelphia Union in 2012

Personal information
- Full name: Zachary Michael MacMath
- Date of birth: August 7, 1991 (age 35)
- Place of birth: St. Petersburg, Florida, United States
- Height: 6 ft 2 in (1.88 m)
- Position: Goalkeeper

Youth career
- 2006–2008: IMG Soccer Academy

College career
| Years | Team | Apps | (Gls) |
| 2008–2010 | Maryland Terrapins | 65 | (0) |

Senior career*
| Years | Team | Apps | (Gls) |
| 2011–2015 | Philadelphia Union | 103 | (0) |
| 2015 | → Colorado Rapids (loan) | 3 | (0) |
| 2016–2018 | Colorado Rapids | 28 | (0) |
| 2019 | Vancouver Whitecaps FC | 8 | (0) |
| 2020–2025 | Real Salt Lake | 98 | (0) |
| 2021 | Real Monarchs | 2 | (0) |

International career^{‡}
| 2006–2007 | United States U17 | 22 | (0) |
| 2010–2011 | United States U20 | 7 | (0) |
- * Club domestic league appearances and goals as of November 28, 2024 ‡ National team caps and goals as of August 5, 2011

Zachary Michael MacMath (born August 7, 1991) is an American former professional soccer player who played as a goalkeeper for Major League Soccer club Real Salt Lake. He was drafted No. 5 overall in the 2011 MLS SuperDraft by the Philadelphia Union.

== Early and personal life ==
MacMath was born in St. Petersburg, Florida, the son of Marcia and Gary MacMath. MacMath is Jewish. His mother is Jewish, his father is Catholic, and MacMath himself practices Judaism. He had a Bar Mitzvah at Temple Beth El, a Reform synagogue in his hometown.

He attended the St. Petersburg High School in his hometown as a freshman, and then attended the IMG Soccer Academy in Bradenton, Florida. He was a two-time Parade magazine High School All-American soccer goalkeeper.

== Club career ==
=== College and amateur ===
MacMath attended the University of Maryland, where he was first choice goalkeeper for three seasons, winning a national title and numerous individual awards along the way. It was during this time that he had a training stint with Premier League club Everton. At the end of the 2008 season and the 2010 season, MacMath was named to the Jewish Sports Review's All-America team.

=== Professional ===
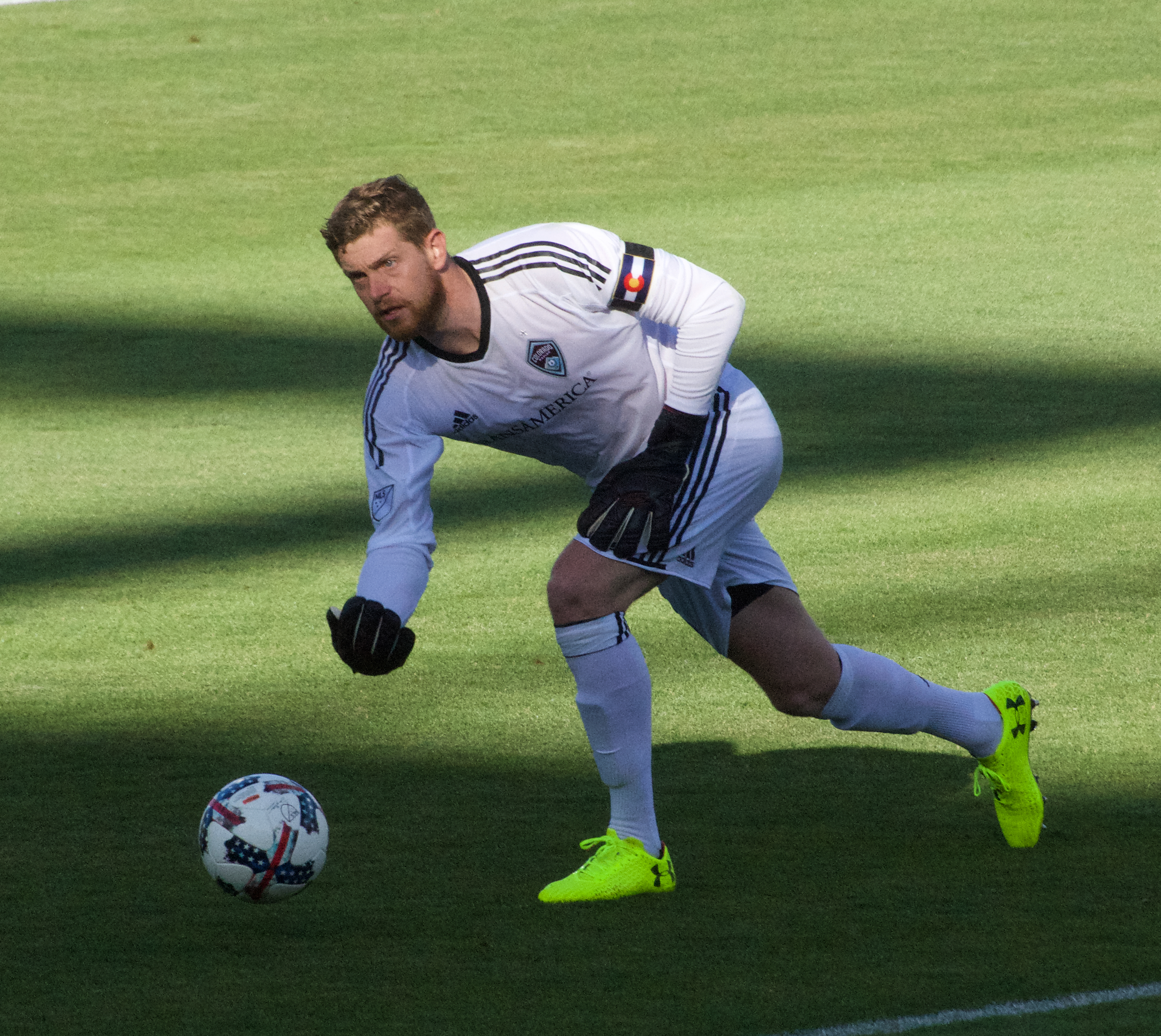
MacMath playing for Colorado Rapids in 2017

MacMath was drafted No. 5 overall in the 2011 MLS SuperDraft by the Philadelphia Union. MacMath started his first string of games in September 2011 due to the injury of starting keeper Faryd Mondragon. After failing to make the 2012 MLS Cup Playoffs, MacMath joined Premier League side Everton for a training stint during the MLS off-season.

In January 2015, MacMath was loaned to Colorado Rapids for the 2015 season.

MacMath's option was declined by Philadelphia at the end of the 2015 MLS season. He was later traded to Colorado in exchange for a second-round pick in the 2017 MLS SuperDraft.

On December 9, 2018, MacMath was traded to Vancouver Whitecaps FC in exchange for Nicolás Mezquida and $100,000 in Targeted Allocation Money (TAM).

On December 17, 2019, Real Salt Lake acquired MacMath from Vancouver in exchange for $50,000 in TAM in 2020.

He announced his retirement on November 7, 2025.

== International career ==
MacMath played in the 2009 Maccabiah Games in Israel, where the American Maccabiah team did not earn a medal.

MacMath led the U.S. U-20 men's national team to the Milk Cup title, posting a strong performance that helped defeat host Northern Ireland, 3–0, at the Showgrounds in Ballymena, on July 30, 2010. MacMath finished the tournament unbeaten after recording a 1–0 victory over China on July 26. MacMath also participated in both training camps in Florida last December and January.

MacMath along with Union teammate Amobi Okugo were called up to the U-20 squad for the CONCACAF U-20 Championship in March–April. The Philadelphia Union is the only Major League Soccer team with two players represented. MacMath also trained with the U-23 Olympic squad in preparation for the 2012 London Olympics in two camps prior to qualifying.

== Career statistics ==
As of October 19, 2024

Appearances and goals by club, season and competition
| Club | Season | League | | | Playoffs | | Cup | | Continental | | Other | | Total | |
| Club | Season | Division | Apps | Goals | Apps | Goals | Apps | Goals | Apps | Goals | Apps | Goals | Apps | Goals |
|---|---|---|---|---|---|---|---|---|---|---|---|---|---|---|
| Philadelphia Union | 2011 | MLS | 8 | 0 | 0 | 0 | 0 | 0 | — | | — | | 8 | 0 |
| Philadelphia Union | 2012 | MLS | 32 | 0 | — | | 3 | 0 | — | | — | | 35 | 0 |
| Philadelphia Union | 2013 | MLS | 34 | 0 | — | | 2 | 0 | — | | — | | 36 | 0 |
| Philadelphia Union | 2014 | MLS | 29 | 0 | — | | 1 | 0 | — | | — | | 30 | 0 |
| Philadelphia Union | Total | | 103 | 0 | 0 | 0 | 6 | 0 | — | | — | | 109 | 0 |
| Colorado Rapids (loan) | 2015 | MLS | 3 | 0 | — | | 2 | 0 | — | | — | | 5 | 0 |
| Colorado Rapids | 2016 | MLS | 17 | 0 | 2 | 0 | 2 | 0 | — | | — | | 21 | 0 |
| Colorado Rapids | 2017 | MLS | 9 | 0 | — | | 2 | 0 | — | | — | | 11 | 0 |
| Colorado Rapids | 2018 | MLS | 2 | 0 | — | | 1 | 0 | 2 | 0 | — | | 5 | 0 |
| Colorado Rapids | Total | | 28 | 0 | 2 | 0 | 5 | 0 | 2 | 0 | — | | 37 | 0 |
| Vancouver Whitecaps FC | 2019 | MLS | 8 | 0 | — | | 0 | 0 | — | | — | | 8 | 0 |
| Real Salt Lake | 2020 | MLS | 3 | 0 | — | | — | | — | | 4 (Note: Appearances in the MLS is Back Tournament) | 0 | 7 | 0 |
| Real Salt Lake | 2021 | MLS | 7 | 0 | — | | — | | — | | 0 | 0 | 7 | 0 |
| Real Salt Lake | 2022 | MLS | 34 | 0 | 1 | 0 | 0 | 0 | — | | 0 | 0 | 35 | 0 |
| Real Salt Lake | 2023 | MLS | 28 | 0 | 3 | 0 | 1 | 0 | — | | 3 (Note: Appearances in the Leagues Cup) | 0 | 35 | 0 |
| Real Salt Lake | 2024 | MLS | 23 | 0 | 2 | 0 | 0 | 0 | — | | 0 | 0 | 25 | 0 |
| Real Salt Lake | Total | | 95 | 0 | 6 | 0 | 1 | 0 | — | | 7 | 0 | 109 | 0 |
| Real Monarchs | 2021 | USLC | 2 | 0 | — | | — | | — | | | | 2 | 0 |
| Career total | | | 239 | 0 | 8 | 0 | 14 | 0 | 2 | 0 | 7 | 0 | 270 | 0 |

== See also ==
- List of Jewish footballers
- List of Jews in sports
