= Michael Farfan =

American soccer player (born 1988)

Michael Farfán
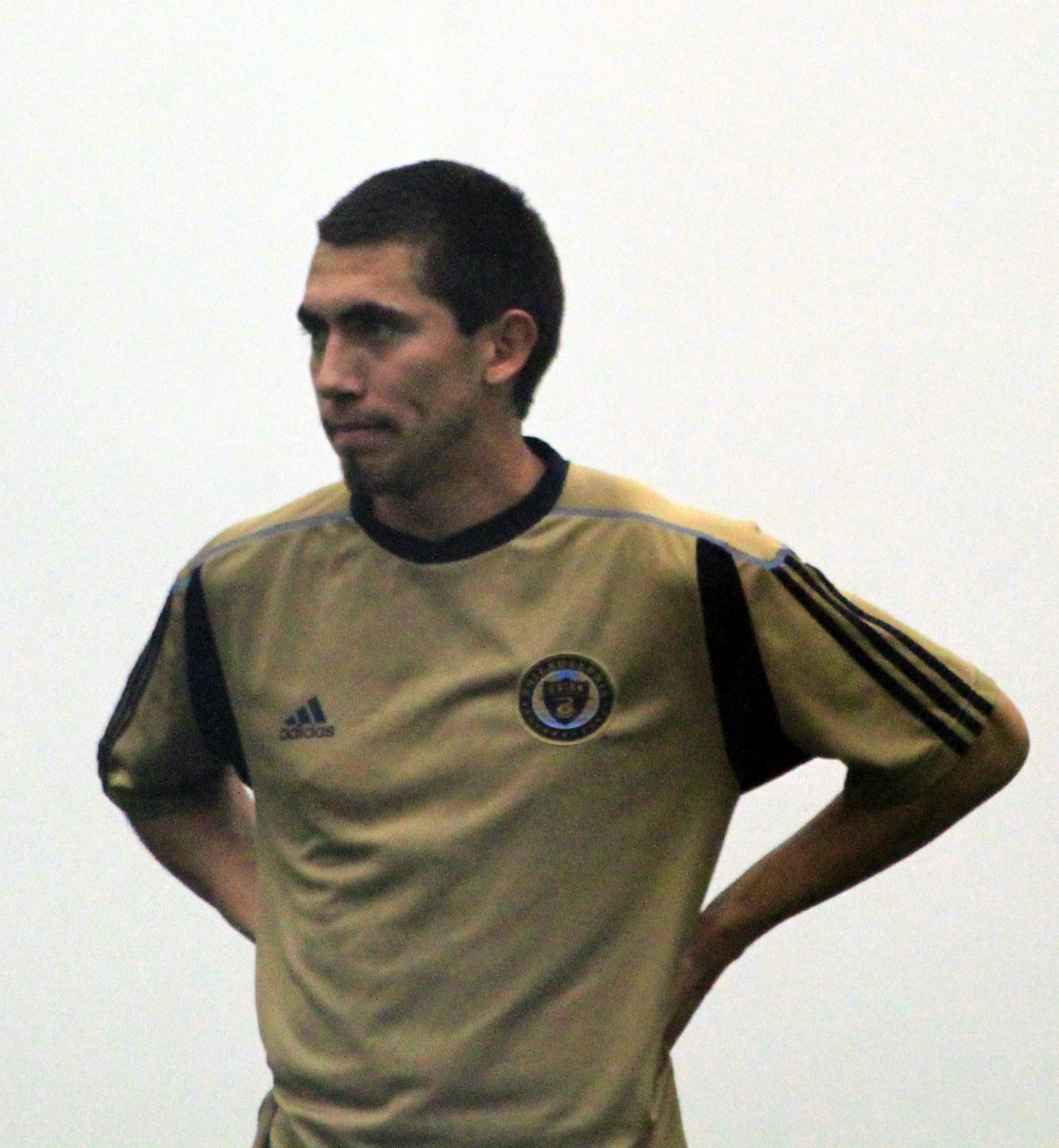
- Farfan at 2011 preseason training with the Union

Personal information
- Full name: Michael Farfán Stopani
- Date of birth: June 23, 1988 (age 38)
- Place of birth: San Diego, California, United States
- Height: 5 ft 9 in (1.75 m)
- Position: Midfielder

Youth career
- 2003–2005: IMG Soccer Academy

College career
Years	Team	Apps	(Gls)
2006–2007	Cal State Fullerton Titans	35	(8)
2009–2010	North Carolina Tar Heels	41	(10)

Senior career*
Years	Team	Apps	(Gls)
2006	Orange County Blue Star	1	(1)
2007–2008	Ventura County Fusion	21	(3)
2009	Los Angeles Legends	8	(3)
2010	Ogden Outlaws	4	(0)
2011–2013	Philadelphia Union	82	(4)
2014	Cruz Azul	1	(1)
2015	D.C. United	17	(0)
2016	Seattle Sounders FC	1	(0)
2016	→ Seattle Sounders FC 2 (loan)	7	(0)
Total		142	(12)

International career^{‡}
2003–2005	United States U17	13	(0)
- * Club domestic league appearances and goals as of December 24, 2016 ‡ National team caps and goals as of January 17, 2011

Michael Farfán Stopani (born June 23, 1988) is an American former professional soccer player.

== Career ==
=== Youth and college ===
Played youth club soccer in Southern California where he captured numerous team titles, including the 2002 national championship. He also played in the Youth World Championships in Japan in 2000 representing a Mexican youth national team.

Farfan played for Castle Park High School in Chula Vista, California where he won All-CIF honors as an underclassman. He later played for Edison Academic Center in Bradenton, Florida while training for the United States U-17 team. As a member of the U-17 team, Farfan played in the 2005 Youth World Cup. After a two-year residency on the United States U-17 team, he enrolled at Fullerton State in the Spring of 2006.

Farfan enrolled in the University of North Carolina in January 2009. He scored five goals with the Tar Heels, with three coming in the first four games, and had four assists. While at North Carolina, he was named NSCAA First Team All-America and All-ACC First Team.

During his college years Farfan also played extensively in the USL Premier Development League, for Orange County Blue Star, Ventura County Fusion, the Los Angeles Legends, and the Ogden Outlaws.

=== Professional ===
On January 13, 2011, Farfan was drafted in the second round (23rd overall) in the 2011 MLS SuperDraft by the Philadelphia Union. He made his professional debut on April 6, 2011, in a Lamar Hunt U.S. Open Cup game against D.C. United and scored his first professional goal – a 25-yard drive from outside the box – on May 21, 2011, in a 2–1 win over Chicago Fire. He was part of the MLS Team of Week 10 for this performance.

After three seasons in Philadelphia, Farfan was sold to Cruz Azul of Liga MX ahead of the 2014 Clasura. He scored in his debut with Cruz Azul against Pachuca. Farfan was released by Cruz Azul just 6-months into his 3-year deal.

Farfan was signed by D.C. United on February 10, 2015.

Farfan signed with Seattle Sounders FC on January 20, 2016.

On February 24, 2017, Farfan announced his retirement via Facebook.

== Personal life ==
Michael's brother, Gabriel Farfán, was also a professional soccer player for before retiring in 2018.

== Career statistics ==
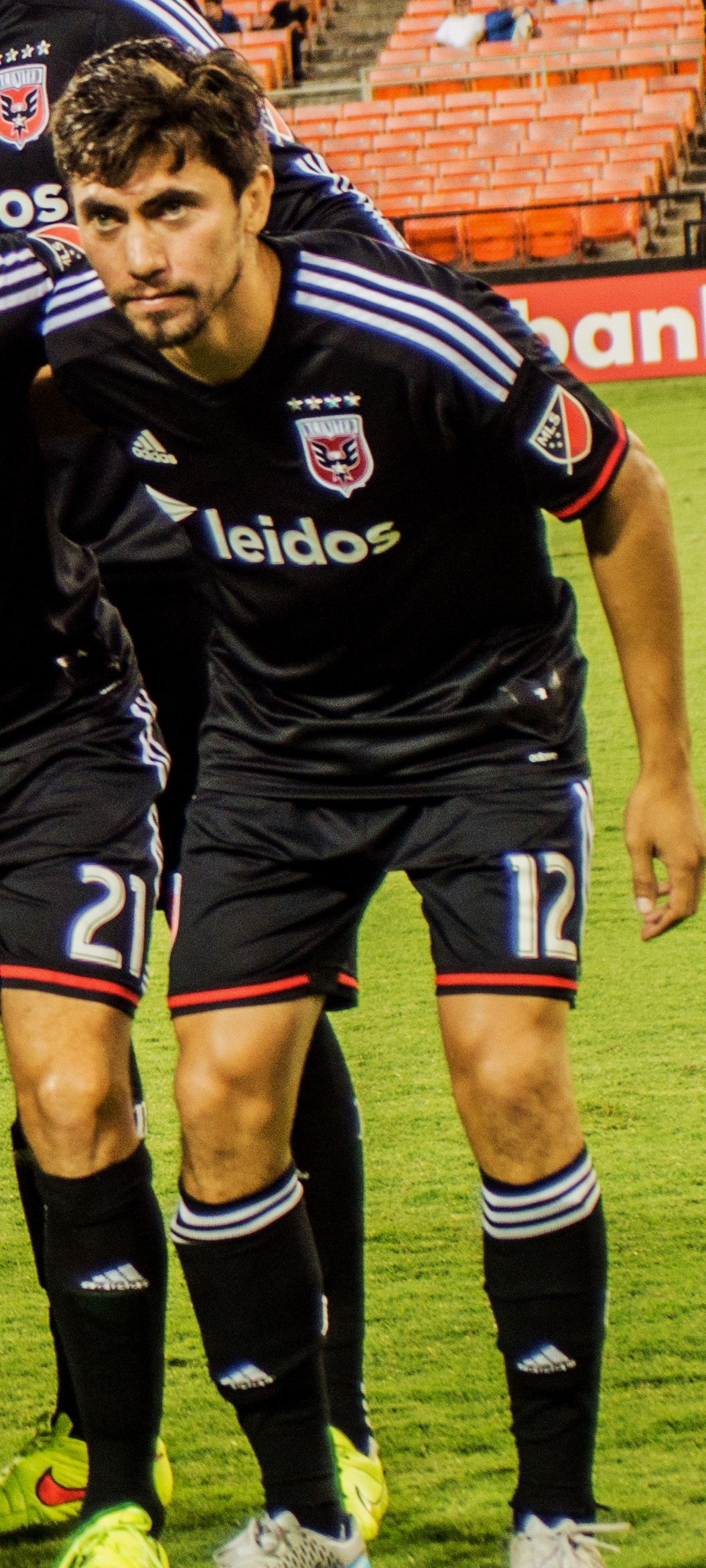
Farfan with D.C. United

=== Club ===
Appearances and goals by club, season and competition
Club	Season	League			National cup (Note: Includes Open Cup.)		League cup		North America		Total	
Club	Season	Division	Apps	Goals	Apps	Goals	Apps	Goals	Apps	Goals	Apps	Goals
Philadelphia Union	2011	Major League Soccer	21	2	1	0	2	0	0	0	24	2
Philadelphia Union	2012	Major League Soccer	32	1	4	0	0	0	0	0	36	1
Philadelphia Union	2013	Major League Soccer	29	1	2	0	0	0	0	0	31	1
Philadelphia Union	Total		82	4	7	0	2	0	0	0	91	4
Cruz Azul	2014	Liga MX	1	1	0	0	0	0	0	0	1	1
D.C. United	2015	Major League Soccer	1	0	0	0	0	0	2	0	3	0
Career total			84	5	7	0	2	0	2	0	95	5

== Honors ==
Cruz Azul

- CONCACAF Champions League: 2013–14

Individual

- Major League Soccer All-Star Team: 2012
