= Danny Mwanga =

Congolese-American soccer player (born 1991)

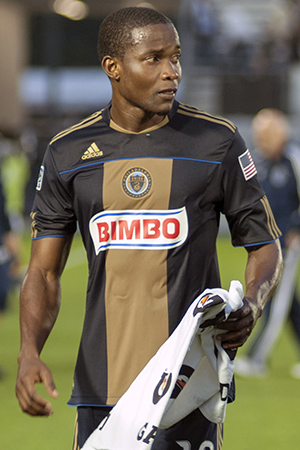
- Mwanga with the Philadelphia Union in 2011

Personal information
- Full name: Jean-Marie Daniel Mwanga
- Date of birth: 17 July 1991 (age 35)
- Place of birth: Kinshasa, Zaire
- Height: 6 ft 2 in (1.88 m)
- Position: Forward

Youth career
- 2006–2010: Westside Metros

College career
Years	Team	Apps	(Gls)
2008–2009	Oregon State Beavers	29	(18)

Senior career*
Years	Team	Apps	(Gls)
2010–2012	Philadelphia Union	61	(12)
2012	Portland Timbers	18	(3)
2013–2014	Colorado Rapids	19	(0)
2014	→ New York Cosmos (loan)	8	(1)
2015	Orlando City SC	4	(0)
2016	Tampa Bay Rowdies	5	(0)
2016	→ Ottawa Fury (loan)	7	(1)
- * Club domestic league appearances and goals

Jean-Marie Daniel "Danny" Mwanga (born 17 July 1991) is a Congolese former professional footballer who played as a forward.

== Career ==
=== Youth ===
Mwanga's father, who was an adviser to former Congolese dictator Mobutu Sese Seko, was killed during the nation's civil war in 1997, and his mother had to leave him and his sisters behind with their grandmother. Mwanga eventually moved to the United States in 2006, reuniting with his mother and settling in Portland, Oregon. He attended Jefferson High School, and played club soccer for Westside Metros Soccer Club before playing college soccer at Oregon State University (OSU). At OSU he started 11 matches as a freshman, scoring four goals, and was named the 2008 Pacific-10 Conference Freshman of the Year. The next year he was the player of the year in the conference after scoring 14 goals in 18 games, and was also selected as a second team All-American.

=== Professional ===
Mwanga was drafted the 1st overall pick of the 2010 MLS SuperDraft by the expansion Philadelphia Union. He made his professional debut in the opening game of the 2010 MLS season, a 2–0 away loss against Seattle Sounders FC. On May 15, he had his first MLS goal at Lincoln Financial Field against FC Dallas in stoppage time to earn the club a 1–1 draw. He also scored a second consecutive stoppage-time goal two weeks later against Houston Dynamo for the Union to win 3–2 away. He scored seven goals in 24 games and was named Soccer America's Rookie of the year, as well a finalist for the MLS Rookie of the Year Award.

He had a two-goal performance at Toronto FC in Philadelphia's 6–2 away win on May 28, 2011. On June 8, Mwanga was named a nominee for the MLS All-Star Game. He scored the game-winning goal for the Union to win 3–2 against Chivas USA on June 25. This goal was nominated for MLS Goal of the Week and placed second. His second season ended with 5 goals from 28 games, as the team lost in the 2011 MLS Cup Playoffs Eastern Conference semi-final to Houston.

In June 2012, Mwanga was traded to the Portland Timbers in exchange for forward Jorge Perlaza. Mwanga was traded to Colorado in exchange for a first-round pick in the 2015 MLS SuperDraft shortly before the 2013 season. Mwanga was loaned to NASL club New York Cosmos on in August 2014. Mwanga made his debut for the Cosmos on August 30 and provided an assist on striker Mads Stokkelien's goal in the team's 2–2 draw at Indy Eleven. Mwanga scored his first goal for the Cosmos the next week in a 2–0 home win over the Fort Lauderdale Strikers. Mwanga finished the 2014 season with one goal and one assist in eight appearances (all starts) for the Cosmos.

Colorado declined the option on Mwanga's contract following the 2014 season. He was made available in the 2014 MLS Expansion Draft and was selected by Orlando City SC with the expansion club's eighth pick.

Mwanga signed with the Tampa Bay Rowdies of the North American Soccer League in December 2015. In August 2016, Mwanga was loaned for the remainder of the season to fellow NASL club Ottawa Fury.

=== International ===
Mwanga became a US citizen on June 24, 2013. He has expressed an interest in representing the United States at the international level (instead of his native DR-Congo), telling Goal.com, "It would be an honor to represent the United States. Playing for the U.S. in a World Cup would be a wonderful opportunity".

== Career statistics ==
Appearances and goals by club, season and competition
Club	Season	League (Note: Includes MLS, NASL.)		Open Cup		MLS Cup		CONCACAF		Total	
Club	Season	Apps	Goals	Apps	Goals	Apps	Goals	Apps	Goals	Apps	Goals
Philadelphia Union	2010	24	7	1	0	–		–		25	7
Philadelphia Union	2011	28	5	1	0	2	0	–		31	5
Philadelphia Union	2012	9	0	0	0	–		–		9	0
Philadelphia Union	Total	61	12	2	0	2	0	0	0	65	12
Portland Timbers	2012	18	3	0	0	–		–		18	3
Colorado Rapids	2013	13	0	1	0	–		–		14	0
Colorado Rapids	2014	5	0	0	0	–		–		5	0
Colorado Rapids	Total	18	0	1	0	0	0	0	0	19	0
New York Cosmos (loan)	2014	8	1	–		–		–		8	1
Career total	105	16	3	0	2	0	0	0	110	16	
