= Juan Diego González =

Colombian footballer (1980–2020)

Personal information
- Full name: Juan Diego González Alzate
- Date of birth: 22 September 1980
- Place of birth: Medellín, Colombia
- Date of death: circa 27 February 2020 (aged 39)
- Place of death: Copacabana, Colombia
- Height: 6 ft 0 in (1.83 m)
- Position: Defender

Youth career
- 1995–1996: Envigado FC U19

Senior career*
Years	Team	Apps	(Gls)
1997–1998	Envigado		
1999–2000	Independiente Medellín		
2000–2001	Almagro		
2001	San Lorenzo		
2002	Envigado		
2003–2004	Santa Fe		
2005	Independiente Medellín		
2005	Once Caldas		
2006	Santos Laguna	9	(0)
2006–2007	Once Caldas	4	(0)
2007–2010	La Equidad	56	(0)
2010	Deportivo Pereira		
2010–2011	Philadelphia Union	7	(0)
- * Club domestic league appearances and goals as of November 23, 2011

Juan Diego González Alzate (22 September 1980 – circa 27 February 2020) was a Colombian footballer.

== Career ==
González began his career in the youth ranks of Envigado. After an impressive start to his career in Colombia, González moved to Argentina joining Almagro in 2000. In 2001, he joined top club San Lorenzo and helped the Argentine side capture the Copa Mercosur that same year. After a brief stay with San Lorenzo he returned to Colombia and his original club Envigado.

The following seasons he would play for various Colombian clubs before joining Mexican club Santos Laguna for a brief spell in 2006. The following season, he returned to Colombia and joined Once Caldas. In 2007, he joined La Equidad and was a prominent member of the squad appearing in 56 league matches and helping his club capture the Colombian Cup in 2008. On 5 August 2010, he signed with the Philadelphia Union. He was waived by Philadelphia on 23 November 2011.

He has played for more than ten clubs throughout his senior career, including clubs in Colombia, Argentina, Mexico and the United States.

== Death ==
González was found dead in the Medellín River on 27 February 2020. His dismembered body was identified on 5 March. His body was found along with a second victim, a 19-year-old man identified as Deiber Galeano.

== Honors ==
=== Club ===
San Lorenzo

- International Mercosur Cup: 2001

La Equidad

- Colombian Cup: 2008
