= MLS Reserve League =

Former soccer league

- Founded: 2005
- Folded: 2014
- Country: United States; Canada
- Last champions: Chicago Fire Reserves

The MLS Reserve League was a soccer league for the reserve teams of Major League Soccer with teams in both the United States and Canada.

It was inaugurated on April 9, 2005, with the first official reserve game being a 2–0 victory by Chivas USA over the host San Jose Earthquakes. The reserve division disbanded after the 2008 season but returned in 2011 with 18 clubs split into East, Central, and West divisions. Each club played ten games consisting of home-and-away matches versus each of its five divisional opponents.

In 2013, the schedule of the MLS Reserve League was integrated with the schedule of the USL Pro, with teams from each league playing each other.

== Format ==
=== 2005–2008 ===
- Each MLS franchise fielded a reserve division team and played a 12-game schedule (six home, six away). All teams played a minimum of seven opposing reserve division teams at least once throughout the year. The reserve division standings consisted of a single table with the team that finished in first place at the end of the regular season earning the title of reserve division champions and a $20,000 team bonus.
- A total of 20 eligible players for the home team and 20 players for the visiting team could be placed on a club's game roster for any Reserve Division game with each team permitted to make up to six substitutions.
- Suspensions attributable to yellow and red cards issued in Reserve Division games would only be imposed for future Reserve Division matches and not for games during the MLS regular season. Similarly, suspensions attributable to yellow and red cards issued during MLS regular season games would not apply to Reserve Division matches.
- Any player who received four yellow cards during the Reserve Division season would be suspended from the next Reserve Division game in which he could appear.
- No player could play more than 120 minutes in a Reserve Team match and any preceding match(es) that occur within a 60-hour period. Injury time is not considered a part of a player's maximum number of minutes played (e.g., if a player enters a game at halftime and the referee adds 2 minutes of stoppage time to the end of the second half, the player will be considered to have played 45 minutes since the 2 minutes of stoppage time is essentially added to make up for 'lost' time).
- A Reserve Division call-up or "Guest Player" with an MLS team could be eligible to appear in an MLS Reserve Division Game provided that he is properly registered with U.S. Soccer.

=== 2011–2012 ===
- Teams face all but two conference opponents once at home and once away. The two matches with a USL Pro side count towards the 14 match season, therefore removing two games with MLS reserve sides.
- Teams may at their discretion schedule additional exhibition games for their reserve squads against non-MLS opponents.
- At the conclusion of the Reserve League season, the team with the most points out of all three conferences will be determined the Reserve League Champion.
- All players appearing on an MLS club's roster may represent their team in MLS Reserve League play; however, no player may play more than 120 minutes in a reserve team match and any preceding matches that occur within a sixty-hour period. Further, no player may play more than a combined total of 90 minutes in a Reserve Team Match and any preceding matches that occurred within 36 hours prior to such reserve team match.
- Clubs may also use up to five academy players per reserve game.
- A Reserve League call-up or "Trialist Player" with a club may appear in reserve league games provided that he is properly registered with US Soccer. A representative from the MLS Club must also certify that the trialist is a bona fide professional soccer player. Trialists may participate in a maximum of two games per club per season.
- Clubs may play up to a maximum of five non-MLS Roster players per Reserve League Game. Within the five non-MLS roster player limit, only three players may be trialist players.

=== 2013–2014 ===
In early 2013, MLS and USL reached an agreement to integrate the schedules of the Reserve League and USL Pro. Matches between teams of each league would be scheduled resulting in more games for all clubs. MLS Reserve teams recorded 6 wins, 9 draws, and 11 losses against USL Pro teams in 2013.

2014 was the final Reserve League season. Starting in 2015, MLS clubs must either affiliate with a USL Pro club or create their own team in the USL Pro. The LA Galaxy reserve team joined USL Pro as the LA Galaxy II in 2014 and finished third. MLS Reserve teams recorded 9 wins, 5 draws, and 14 losses against USL Pro teams in 2014.

== Past winners ==
Season	Winners	Runners-up
2005	D.C. United Reserves	MetroStars Reserves
2006	Colorado Rapids Reserves	Kansas City Reserves
2007	Colorado Rapids Reserves	Chivas USA Reserves
2008	Houston Dynamo Reserves	Kansas City Reserves
2009–2010	Reserve League on hiatus	
2011	Columbus Crew Reserves	Seattle Sounders Reserves
2012	Columbus Crew Reserves	Montreal Impact Reserves
2013	No Championship game, Houston (East) & LA Galaxy (West) won their divisions.	
2014	Chicago Fire Reserves	Seattle Sounders Reserves

=== Winners table ===
Team	Titles
Colorado Rapids	2
Columbus Crew	2
D.C. United	1
Houston Dynamo	1
Chicago Fire Reserves	1

== Final standings by year ==
=== 2005 ===
Pos	Club	Pld	W	L	T	GF	GA	GD	Pts
1	D.C. United Reserves (C)	12	8	4	0	26	21	+5	24
2	MetroStars Reserves	12	5	3	4	16	12	+4	19
2	New England Revolution Reserves	12	5	3	4	20	18	+2	19
2	FC Dallas Reserves	12	6	5	1	24	24	0	19
5	Colorado Rapids Reserves	12	5	4	3	29	22	+7	18
5	Chicago Fire Reserves	12	5	4	3	24	20	+4	18
5	San Jose Earthquakes Reserves	12	5	4	3	23	20	+3	18
5	Kansas City Wizards Reserves	12	5	4	3	19	17	+2	18
9	Los Angeles Galaxy Reserves	12	4	5	3	20	28	−8	15
10	Real Salt Lake Reserves	12	4	6	2	29	34	−5	14
11	Columbus Crew Reserves	12	4	7	1	19	25	−6	13
12	Chivas USA Reserves	12	2	9	1	15	23	−8	7

=== 2006 ===
Pos	Club	Pld	W	L	T	GF	GA	GD	Pts
1	Colorado Rapids Reserves (C)	12	9	3	0	24	14	+10	27
2	Kansas City Wizards Reserves	12	7	3	2	25	16	+9	23
3	Houston Dynamo Reserves	12	7	5	0	24	17	+7	21
3	Real Salt Lake Reserves	12	6	3	3	23	20	+3	21
5	D.C. United Reserves	12	6	5	1	22	11	+11	19
6	FC Dallas Reserves	12	4	3	5	20	13	+7	17
7	New York Red Bulls Reserves	12	5	6	1	15	25	−10	16
8	Chivas USA Reserves	12	4	5	3	18	23	−5	15
9	Los Angeles Galaxy Reserves	12	4	6	2	20	19	+1	14
9	Chicago Fire Reserves	11	4	5	2	16	18	−2	14
11	Columbus Crew Reserves	12	3	8	1	14	23	−9	10
12	New England Revolution Reserves	11	0	7	4	9	31	−22	4

=== 2007 ===
Pos	Club	Pld	W	L	T	GF	GA	GD	Pts
1	Colorado Rapids Reserves (C)	10	7	0	3	22	8	+14	24
2	Chivas USA Reserves	11	6	3	2	25	23	+2	20
2	New England Revolution Reserves	12	6	4	2	20	14	+6	20
4	Kansas City Wizards Reserves	12	6	5	1	22	19	+3	19
5	D.C. United Reserves	12	4	3	5	16	12	+4	17
6	FC Dallas Reserves	12	4	4	4	17	18	−1	16
7	Columbus Crew Reserves	11	4	4	3	17	14	+3	15
7	New York Red Bulls Reserves	9	5	4	0	14	15	−1	15
7	Real Salt Lake Reserves	11	5	6	0	19	17	+2	15
10	Toronto FC Reserves	12	3	5	4	14	19	−5	13
11	Houston Dynamo Reserves	12	3	6	3	16	21	−5	12
12	Chicago Fire Reserves	11	2	6	3	12	19	−7	9
13	Los Angeles Galaxy Reserves	11	2	7	2	14	29	−15	8

=== 2008 ===
Pos	Club	Pld	W	L	T	GF	GA	GD	Pts
1	Houston Dynamo Reserves (C)	12	9	1	2	33	15	+18	29
2	Kansas City Wizards Reserves	11	8	1	2	31	13	+18	26
3	Real Salt Lake Reserves	12	7	3	2	31	24	+7	23
4	Chicago Fire Reserves	12	5	5	2	25	22	+3	17
5	D.C. United Reserves	10	5	4	1	19	21	−2	16
5	Toronto FC Reserves	10	5	4	1	12	19	−7	16
7	Chivas USA Reserves	12	4	5	3	19	21	−2	15
7	San Jose Earthquakes Reserves	12	4	5	3	18	22	−4	15
7	FC Dallas Reserves	12	4	5	3	19	24	−5	15
10	Columbus Crew Reserves	11	4	5	2	13	13	0	14
11	Colorado Rapids Reserves	12	4	6	2	16	21	−5	14
12	New York Red Bulls Reserves	12	3	7	2	16	23	−7	11
13	New England Revolution Reserves	10	2	6	2	11	16	−5	8
14	Los Angeles Galaxy Reserves	12	1	8	3	15	23	−8	6

=== 2011 ===
==== Eastern ====
Pos	Club	Pld	W	L	T	GF	GA	GD	Pts
1	Columbus Crew Reserves (C)	10	9	1	0	29	10	+19	27
2	D.C. United Reserves	10	5	1	4	21	14	+7	19
3	New England Revolution Reserves	10	4	5	1	14	22	−8	13
4	New York Red Bulls Reserves	9	2	5	2	10	20	−10	9
5	Toronto FC Reserves	9	2	5	2	15	15	0	8
6	Philadelphia Union Reserves	10	2	7	1	9	17	−8	7

==== Central/Mountain ====
Pos	Club	Pld	W	L	T	GF	GA	GD	Pts
1	Chicago Fire Reserves (C)	10	7	2	1	19	10	+9	22
2	Houston Dynamo Reserves	10	6	4	0	11	5	+6	18
2	FC Dallas Reserves	10	6	4	0	18	21	−3	18
4	Sporting K.C. Reserves	10	3	5	2	11	14	−3	11
5	Colorado Rapids Reserves	10	3	6	1	12	11	+1	10
6	Real Salt Lake Reserves	10	3	7	0	10	10	0	9

==== Western ====
Pos	Club	Pld	W	L	T	GF	GA	GD	Pts
1	Seattle Sounders Reserves (C)	10	8	1	1	21	11	+10	25
2	Portland Timbers Reserves	10	6	2	2	24	16	+8	20
3	Chivas USA Reserves	10	3	3	4	18	21	−3	13
4	San Jose Earthquakes Reserves	9	3	5	1	11	12	−1	10
5	Vancouver Whitecaps Reserves	10	2	6	2	10	14	−5	8
6	Los Angeles Galaxy Reserves	9	1	6	2	11	20	−9	5

=== 2012 ===
==== Eastern ====
Pos	Club	Pld	W	L	T	GF	GA	GD	Pts
1	Columbus Crew Reserves (C)	10	7	2	1	21	9	+12	22
2	Montreal Impact Reserves	10	7	2	1	19	10	+9	22
3	Philadelphia Union Reserves	10	4	4	2	20	20	0	14
4	New York Red Bulls Reserves	10	3	5	2	14	16	−2	11
5	D.C. United Reserves	9	3	5	1	9	19	-10	10
6	New England Revolution Reserves	10	2	5	3	9	15	−6	9
7	Toronto FC Reserves	9	2	5	2	13	16	−3	8

==== Central/Mountain ====
Pos	Club	Pld	W	L	T	GF	GA	GD	Pts
1	Houston Dynamo Reserves (C)	10	6	2	2	19	11	+8	20
2	FC Dallas Reserves	10	6	3	1	17	11	+6	18
3	Colorado Rapids Reserves	10	5	4	1	12	10	+2	16
4	Chicago Fire Reserves	10	4	6	0	12	15	−3	12
5	Real Salt Lake Reserves	10	3	5	2	10	17	−7	11
6	Sporting K.C. Reserves	10	2	6	2	8	16	−8	8

==== Western ====
Pos	Club	Pld	W	L	T	GF	GA	GD	Pts
1	Los Angeles Galaxy Reserves (C)	10	6	3	1	22	11	+11	19
2	San Jose Earthquakes Reserves	10	5	3	2	15	12	+3	17
3	Seattle Sounders Reserves	10	4	5	1	18	19	-1	13
3	Portland Timbers Reserves	10	4	5	1	17	18	-1	13
5	Chivas USA Reserves	10	3	4	3	21	21	0	12
6	Vancouver Whitecaps Reserves	10	3	5	2	11	22	−11	11

=== 2013 ===
==== East ====
Pos	Club	GP	W	L	T	GF	GA	GD	Pts	PPG
1	Houston Dynamo Reserves (C)	9	5	4	0	12	16	-4	15	1.67
2	Columbus Crew Reserves	14	6	6	2	28	26	+2	20	1.43
3	New York Red Bulls Reserves	12	5	5	2	24	19	+5	17	1.42
4	Montreal Impact Reserves	11	4	4	3	16	13	+3	15	1.36
5	Toronto FC Reserves	8	3	4	1	15	12	+3	10	1.25
6	FC Dallas Reserves	13	5	7	1	21	26	-5	16	1.23
7	Chicago Fire Reserves	13	5	7	1	24	30	-6	16	1.23

==== West ====
Pos	Club	Pld	W	L	T	GF	GA	GD	Pts	PPG
1	LA Galaxy Reserves (C)	10	5	1	4	16	9	+7	19	1.90
2	Vancouver Whitecaps Reserves	10	4	2	4	21	15	+6	16	1.60
3	Real Salt Lake Reserves	14	6	4	4	14	13	+1	22	1.57
4	Chivas USA Reserves	12	5	6	1	23	24	-1	16	1.33
5	San Jose Earthquakes Reserves	10	4	5	1	18	12	+6	13	1.30
6	Colorado Rapids Reserves	14	5	7	2	16	20	-4	17	1.21
7	Seattle Sounders FC Reserves	12	4	6	2	17	21	-4	14	1.17
8	Portland Timbers Reserves	14	4	7	3	16	23	-7	15	1.07

==== USL Pro ====
Beginning in 2013, MLS teams could elect to affiliate with a USL Pro team rather than fielding an MLS Reserve League team.

MLS club	USL Pro affiliate
D.C. United	Richmond Kickers
New England Revolution	Rochester Rhinos
Philadelphia Union	Harrisburg City Islanders
Sporting Kansas City	Orlando City

=== 2014 ===
Pos	Club	GP	W	L	T	GF	GA	GD	Pts	PPG
1	Chicago Fire Reserves (C)	9	6	1	2	16	9	+7	20	2.22
2	Seattle Sounders Reserves	7	3	1	3	11	6	+5	12	1.71
3	FC Dallas Reserves	8	4	4	0	11	11	0	12	1.50
4	Montreal Impact Reserves	8	3	4	1	8	8	0	10	1.25
5	Colorado Rapids Reserves	6	1	2	3	9	11	-2	6	1.00
6	Real Salt Lake Reserves	7	1	2	4	8	10	-2	7	1.00
7	New York Red Bulls Reserves	8	2	5	1	9	15	-6	7	0.88
8	Chivas USA Reserves	7	1	5	1	9	12	-3	4	0.57

==== USL Pro ====
In 2014, the number of MLS teams electing to affiliate with USL Pro teams (rather than fielding an MLS Reserve League team) increased and the LA Galaxy moved their reserve team to compete directly in the USL Pro league.

MLS club	USL Pro affiliate
Columbus Crew	Dayton Dutch Lions
D.C. United	Richmond Kickers
Houston Dynamo	Pittsburgh Riverhounds
LA Galaxy	LA Galaxy II
New England Revolution	Rochester Rhinos
Philadelphia Union	Harrisburg City Islanders
Portland Timbers	Sacramento Republic
San Jose Earthquakes	Sacramento Republic
Sporting Kansas City	Oklahoma City Energy; Orlando City SC
Toronto FC	Wilmington Hammerheads
Vancouver Whitecaps FC	Charleston Battery
