= Chris Pontius (soccer) =

American soccer player (born 1987)

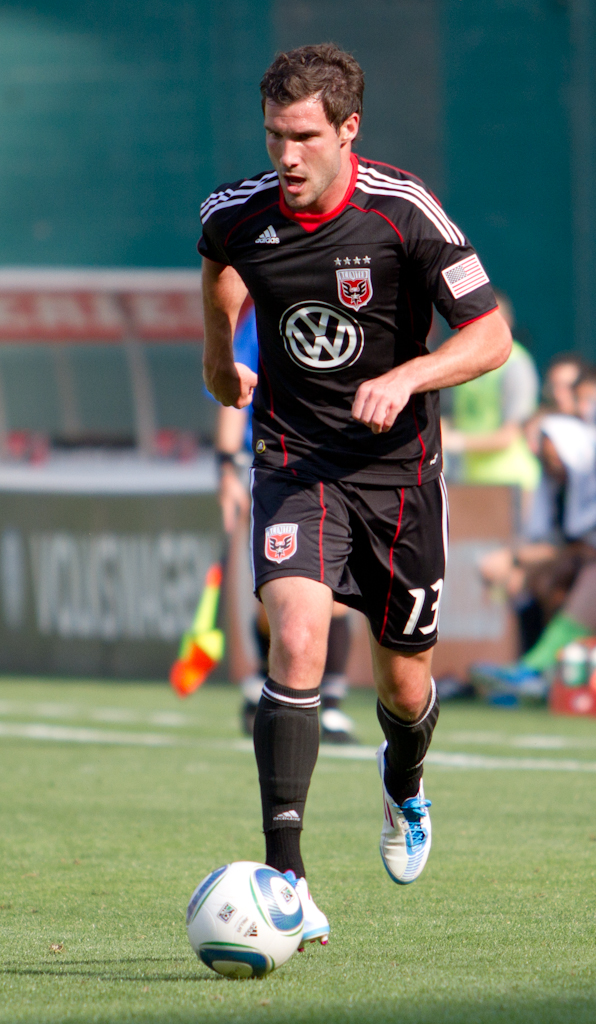
- Pontius with D.C. United in 2011

Personal information
- Full name: Christopher Richard Pontius
- Date of birth: May 12, 1987 (age 39)
- Place of birth: Yorba Linda, California, U.S.
- Height: 6 ft 0 in (1.83 m)
- Position: Attacking midfielder

Youth career
- Irvine Strikers
- 2001–2005: Servite High School

College career
Years	Team	Apps	(Gls)
2005–2008	UC Santa Barbara Gauchos	86	(29)

Senior career*
Years	Team	Apps	(Gls)
2008	Ventura County Fusion	0	(0)
2009–2015	D.C. United	152	(31)
2016–2017	Philadelphia Union	63	(14)
2018–2019	LA Galaxy	44	(7)
Total		259	(52)

International career^{‡}
2017	United States	5	(0)
- * Club domestic league appearances and goals as of October 29, 2019 ‡ National team caps and goals as of October 29, 2019

Christopher Richard Pontius (born May 12, 1987) is an American former professional soccer player.

== Early life and education ==
Pontius attended and played central midfield for Servite High School. He played club soccer with the Irvine Strikers.

He played college soccer at the University of California, Santa Barbara, where he was named Big West Conference Offensive Player of the Year in 2007, and Hermann Trophy candidate in 2008. In 2006, Pontius and the UC Santa Barbara Gauchos won the NCAA Division I Men's Soccer Championship.

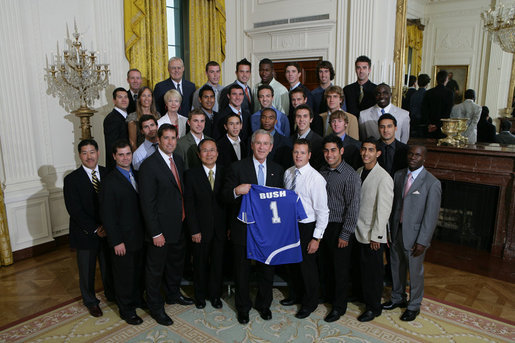
Pontius and the 2006 UCSB Gauchos soccer team honored at the White House

== Playing career ==
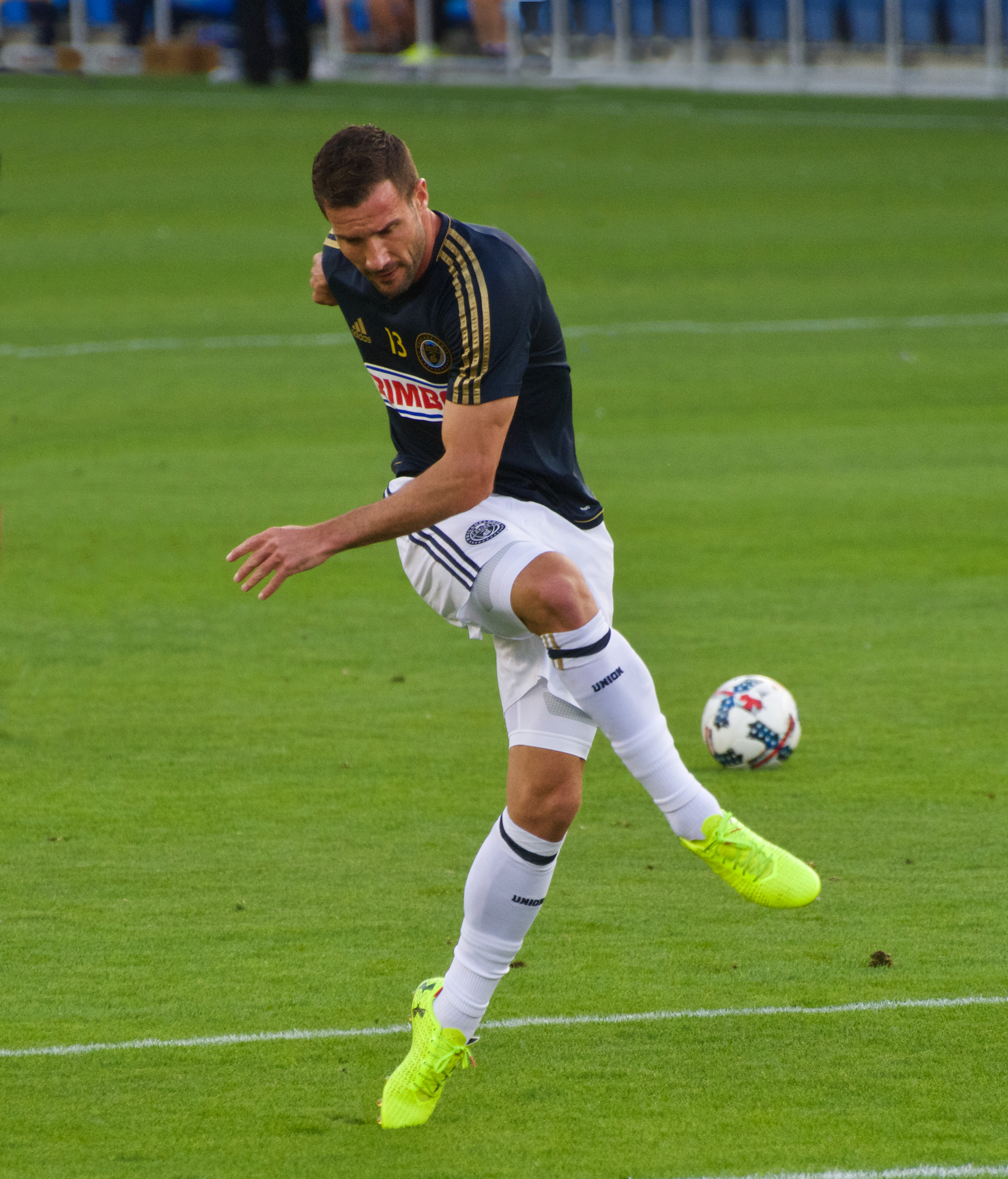
Warming up before a Philadelphia Union game

Despite being originally named to Ventura County Fusion's roster in 2008 along with several other Gauchos, he did not appear in any matches for the club.

=== D.C. United ===
Pontius was drafted in the first round (7th overall) of the 2009 MLS SuperDraft by D.C. United. He made his professional debut, and scored his first professional goal, on March 22, 2009, in D.C. United's first game of the 2009 MLS season against Los Angeles Galaxy. On May 23, 2010, Pontius scored D.C.'s 2nd goal in the 3–2 victory against Italian giants A.C. Milan. On July 25, 2012, he scored the MLS All-Star's 2nd goal against Chelsea F.C. to equalize their eventual 3–2 win. Also in 2012, Pontius emerged as D.C. United's leading goal scorer with 10 goals through the first 27 league matches. On September 14, 2012, D.C. United announced Pontius' signing to a long-term contract extension with the club (terms of the extension are as yet undisclosed).

Pontius has had a career riddled with injuries. In September 2010, he had a hamstring injury that required surgery and ended his season. Again in 2011, his season ended early with a fractured tibia. In 2012, his first injury-free season since his debut, he scored a career-high 12 goals. Injuries again plagued Pontius in 2013 and he only played in 22 of the 34 matches that year. D.C. United announced in April 2014, that Pontius would again undergo hamstring surgery and would likely miss most of the 2014 season. Pontius eventually returned to the lineup as a substitute on September 10, 2014, with a mere 8 games left in the regular season. He played 182 games, scored 37 goals, and recorded 23 assists for DC.

=== Philadelphia Union ===
On December 7, 2015, Pontius was traded to Philadelphia Union for allocation money. Pontius saw a resurgence to form and became a major contributor to the Union's 2016 season as he led the team in scoring with 12 goals from 34 appearances on the left wing. This return to form earned him the 2016 MLS Comeback Player of the Year.

=== LA Galaxy ===
Pontius signed as a free agent with LA Galaxy in January 2018. Pontius's contract with LA Galaxy concluded at the end of their 2018 season. He re-signed with the club on December 19. Pontius announced his retirement from professional soccer on October 29, 2019.

=== International ===
On December 22, 2009, Pontius received his first call-up to train with the senior U.S. national team. Training in Carson, California began for Pontius and the other players called up on January 4, 2010, leading up to a friendly match against Chile. On August 29, 2011, Pontius was called up by the U.S. National Team for friendlies against Costa Rica and Belgium. Pontius debuted for the national team on January 29, 2017, as a substitute in a friendly against Serbia.

== Career statistics ==
As of January 2, 2017

All-time club performance
Club	Season	MLS		MLS Cup		U.S. Open Cup		CONCACAF		Total
Club	Season	App	Goals	App	Goals	App	Goals	App	Goals	App	Goals
D.C. United	2009	28	4	-	-	3	0	5	2	36	6
D.C. United	2010	17	2	-	-	4	0	-	-	21	2
D.C. United	2011	25	7	-	-	2	0	-	-	27	7
D.C. United	2012	31	12	3	0	0	0	-	-	34	12
D.C. United	2013	22	2	-	-	5	1	-	-	27	3
D.C. United	2014	8	1	2	0	0	0	-	-	10	1
D.C. United	2015	23	3	1	1	0	0	6	0	30	4
Philadelphia Union	2016	34	12	1	0	2	2	-	-	36	14
Club Total		186	43	7	1	16	3	11	2	221	49
Career Total		186	43	7	1	16	3	11	2	221	49

== Awards and honors ==
UC Santa Barbara

- NCAA Division I Men's Soccer Tournament: 2006

D.C. United

- U.S. Open Cup: 2013

United States

- CONCACAF Gold Cup: 2017

Individual

- Big West Conference Offensive Player of the Year: 2007
- Comeback Player of the Year: 2016
- MLS All-Star: 2012
- MLS All-Star MVP: 2012
- MLS Best XI: 2012
