= Philadelphia Union Reserves =

Soccer team

- Nickname: The Union Reserves
- Founded: 2011
- Dissolved: 2013
- Stadium: Chester Park; Wallingford, Pennsylvania
- Owner: Keystone Sports & Entertainment
- League: MLS Reserve Division
- Website: http://www.philadelphiaunion.com/
Home colors	Away colors	Third colors

Philadelphia Union Reserves were the reserve team for the Philadelphia Union of Major League Soccer and competed in the East Division of the MLS Reserve League.

The team played its home games at Chester Park in Wallingford, Pennsylvania, the home of the Union practice facility. The team's colors are navy blue and gold. First team assistant coach and head coach of Reading United A.C. Brendan Burke was the head coach of the reserve side.

Due to the Union's affiliation with the Harrisburg City Islanders, the Union will not field a Reserve team in 2013.

== History ==
The new MLS Reserve Division was resurrected for the 2011 season, after not having played since 2008. Each team played 10 games against divisional opponents, with clubs being allowed schedule additional games against non-MLS opponents, the League began March 20, 2011 and concluded October 16, 2011. Philadelphia Union Reserves played 10 regional Reserve League games as part of the East division in 2011. The Re-launching of the MLS Reserve Division was made possible by the growth of first team rosters from 24 in 2010 to 30 players in 2011. Reading United A.C. Head Coach and former Boston College standout Brendan Burke guided the first ever Union Reserve squad. The most successful coach in Reading's 15-year history, Burke compiled a 38-9-6 record and led the squad to their first ever PDL regular season title since taking over the reins in 2008. In 2010, he was named a PDL Coach of the Year finalist.

For 2013 and beyond, the Union have chosen to affiliate with the Harrisburg City Islanders. Under this arrangement, in lieu of fielding a Reserve team, the Union will loan a minimum of four players to the City Islanders. Because of this, the Union will no longer field a Reserve team.

== Stadium ==
- Chester Park; Wallingford, Pennsylvania (2011–present)

== Head coaches ==
- (Republic of Ireland) Brendan Burke (2011–2012)

== Year-by-year ==
Year	League Standings						Head coach		Top Scorer		
Reserve Season	GP	Pts	W	L	T	Position	Nat.	Name	Nat.	Name	Goals
2011	10	7	2	7	1	6th	(Republic of Ireland)	Brendan Burke	(United States)	Jack McInerney	3
2012	10	14	4	4	2	3rd	(Republic of Ireland)	Brendan Burke	(United States)	Chandler Hoffman	5

== See also ==
- Sports in Philadelphia
- Philadelphia Union
