= Thorne Holder =

Trinidadian footballer (born 1986)

Personal information
- Full name: Hasely Thorne Holder
- Date of birth: April 4, 1986 (age 40)
- Place of birth: Port of Spain, Trinidad and Tobago
- Height: 6 ft 4 in (1.93 m)
- Position: Goalkeeper

Youth career
- 2003: Queen's Royal College Intercol
- 2004–2006: San Juan Jabloteh U-20

College career
Years	Team	Apps	(Gls)
2007	Maryland Terrapins	11	(0)
2008–2010	Adelphi Panthers	47	(0)

Senior career*
Years	Team	Apps	(Gls)
2008–2009	Long Island Rough Riders	19	(1)
2011	Philadelphia Union	0	(0)
2011	F.C. New York	5	(0)
2011	Philadelphia Union	0	(0)

International career
2003	Trinidad and Tobago U-17		
2004–2006	Trinidad and Tobago U-20		
- * Club domestic league appearances and goals as of November 23, 2011

Hasely Thorne Holder (born April 4, 1986 in Port of Spain) is a Trinidadian footballer.

== Career ==
=== College and amateur ===
Holder began his career in Trinidad and Tobago with Queen's Royal College Intercol. While with QRC he helped them win the North Zone Intercol title in 2003. In 2004, he joined San Juan Jabloteh and played with their Under-20 side and was recognized as the league's top keeper.

In 2007, he left the Island to play college soccer for the University of Maryland. Holder remained at Maryland for one season before transferring to Adelphi University in 2008. While with Adelphi Holder appeared in 47 matches and recorded 19 shutouts. Holder also played for USL Premier Development League club Long Island Rough Riders during both their 2008 and 2009 seasons.

=== Professional ===
During the 2011 Major League Soccer preseason Holder went on trial with Philadelphia Union. He made a favorable impression and on March 1, 2011 was signed by the club. During the season he was released, signed by F.C. New York of the third division USL Pro league, and then re-signed by Philadelphia. On November 23, 2011, Holder was waived by Philadelphia.
