= 2013 Philadelphia Union season =

Philadelphia Union
2013 season
- Owner: Keystone Sports & Entertainment
- Manager: John Hackworth
- Stadium: PPL Park (Capacity: 18,500)
- Major League Soccer: Eastern Conference: 7th Overall table: 14th
- U.S. Open Cup: 4th Round
- Top goalscorer: Jack McInerney (10)
- Highest home attendance: 19,013 v New York Red Bulls; June 23, 2013
- Lowest home attendance: 15,172 v Chivas USA; July 12, 2013
- Average home league attendance: 17,867 (96.58% capacity); 6 sellouts (Through October 27, 2013)
Home colors	Away colors	Third colors

The 2013 Philadelphia Union season was the fourth season of the team's existence, competing in Major League Soccer, the top flight of American soccer. The team was managed by John Hackworth, in his second season with the club and first full season after taking over from Peter Nowak midway through the 2012 season.

== Background ==
This was the 4th season in MLS for the Philadelphia and the first full year under manager John Hackworth.

== 2013 roster ==
As of October 1, 2013.

Note: Flags indicate national team as defined under FIFA eligibility rules; some limited exceptions apply. Players may hold more than one non-FIFA nationality.

No.	Pos.	Nation	Player
3	DF	USA	Chris Albright
6	FW	USA	Conor Casey
7	MF	USA	Brian Carroll (Captain)
8	DF	USA	Matt Kassel
9	FW	USA	Jack McInerney (GA)
10	MF	COL	Roger Torres
11	FW	FRA	Sébastien Le Toux
12	FW	USA	Aaron Wheeler
13	MF	USA	Michael Lahoud
14	MF	USA	Amobi Okugo (GA)
16	DF	USA	Don Anding
17	FW	CIV	Yann Ekra
18	GK	USA	Zac MacMath (GA)

No.	Pos.	Nation	Player
19	FW	BRA	Kléberson (DP, on loan from Bahia)
21	MF	USA	Michael Farfan
22	MF	BRA	Leo Fernandes
25	DF	USA	Sheanon Williams
26	MF	TRI	Keon Daniel
28	DF	USA	Ray Gaddis
29	MF	USA	Antoine Hoppenot
31	DF	USA	Jeff Parke (Vice-captain)
33	DF	BRA	Fabinho
39	GK	MKD	Oka Nikolov
40	MF	BRA	Gilberto Júnior
44	MF	USA	Danny Cruz

=== Out on loan ===
Note: Flags indicate national team as defined under FIFA eligibility rules; some limited exceptions apply. Players may hold more than one non-FIFA nationality.

No.	Pos.	Nation	Player
2	DF	COL	Carlos Valdés (on loan at Independiente Santa Fe)
5	MF	USA	Greg Jordan (on loan at Harrisburg City Islanders)
20	MF	USA	Jimmy McLaughlin (HGP on loan at Harrisburg City Islanders)
23	FW	MEX	Cristhian Hernández (HGP on loan at Harrisburg City Islanders)
27	MF	USA	Zach Pfeffer (HGP on loan at 1899 Hoffenheim)

== Match results ==
Win Loss Tie

=== Preseason friendlies ===
February 15, 2013 1	Philadelphia Union	0–0	Montreal Impact	Jacksonville, Florida
7:30 PM ET	Soumaré (yellow card) 42'; Le Toux (yellow card) 66'	Report	Bush (yellow card) 15'	Stadium: EverBank Field

February 20, 2013 2	Philadelphia Union	1–1	D.C. United	Deltona, Florida
6:00 PM ET	Hoffman 39'; Lahoud (yellow card) 58'; Anding (yellow card) 61'; Albright (yellow card) 75'	Report	Porter 15' (pen.)	Stadium: Dewey O. Boster Sports Complex; Attendance: 1,700

==== 2013 Walt Disney World Pro Soccer Classic ====
February 9, 2013 1	Orlando City SC	1–1	Philadelphia Union	Lake Buena Vista, Florida
6:00 PM ET	Chin 53'	Report	Fernandes 71'	Stadium: ESPN Wide World of Sports Complex

February 13, 2013 2	Philadelphia Union	0–4	Columbus Crew	Lake Buena Vista, Florida
1:00 PM ET		Recap	Finley 28'; Finlay 40', 52'; Schoenfeld 53'	Stadium: ESPN Wide World of Sports Complex

February 16, 2013 3	Philadelphia Union	3–0	Toronto FC	Lake Buena Vista, Florida
3:00 PM ET	Hoppenot 8'; Torres 40'; Kassel 51'	Report		Stadium: ESPN Wide World of Sports Complex

February 23, 2013 4	Philadelphia Union	0–2	D.C. United	Lake Buena Vista, Florida
1:00 PM ET	MacMath (yellow card) 36'; Farfan (yellow card) 74'; Le Toux (yellow card) 75'	Report	De Rosario 39' (pen.); Saragosa (yellow card) 58'; De Rosario (red card) 59'; Pajoy 67'	Stadium: ESPN Wide World of Sports Complex

=== MLS regular season ===
The Union ended the season 12-12-10 overall, 7-5-5 at home, 5-7-5 on the road.

March 2, 2013 1	Philadelphia Union	1–3	Sporting Kansas City	Chester, Pennsylvania
4:00 PM ET	Le Toux 17'; Gaddis (yellow card) 89'	Report; TV: 6abc	Collin (yellow card) 25'; Zusi 41'; Convey (yellow card) 56'; Uri 66'; Bieler 83'	Stadium: PPL Park; Attendance: 18,160; Referee: Mark Geiger

March 10, 2013 2	Colorado Rapids	1–2	Philadelphia Union	Commerce City, Colorado
1:00 PM MT	Harbottle (yellow card) 37'; Thomas (yellow card) 67'; Smith 68'	Report; TV: TCN	Okugo 34'; McInerney 79'; Cruz (yellow card) 90+'	Stadium: Dick's Sporting Goods Park; Attendance: 15,122; Referee: Ismail Elfath

March 16, 2013 3	Philadelphia Union	1–0	New England Revolution	Chester, Pennsylvania
5:00 PM ET	Okugo (yellow card) 42'; McInerney 76'; Parke (yellow card) 90+'	Report; TV: TCN	Soares (yellow card) 27'; Shuttleworth (yellow card) 84'	Stadium: PPL Park; Attendance: 15,689; Referee: Jose Carlos Rivero

March 30, 2013 4	New York Red Bulls	2–1	Philadelphia Union	Harrison, New Jersey
3:30 PM ET	McCarty 55'; Henry 81'	Report; TV: NBCSN	Casey 63'; Casey (yellow card) 90+'	Stadium: Red Bull Arena; Attendance: 15,824; Referee: Silviu Petrescu

April 6, 2013 5	Columbus Crew	1–1	Philadelphia Union	Columbus, Ohio
5:00 PM ET	Oduro 72'; Wahl (yellow card) 77'; Higuaín (yellow card) 86'; Sánchez (yellow card) 90+'; Gláuber (yellow card) 90+'	Report; TV: Live Well Network	McInerney 34'; Daniel (yellow card) 70'; Williams (yellow card) 84'	Stadium: Columbus Crew Stadium; Attendance: 10,293; Referee: Matthew Foerster

April 13, 2013 6	Philadelphia Union	1–1	Toronto FC	Chester, Pennsylvania
4:00 PM ET	Cruz (yellow card) 36'; Daniel (yellow card) 83'; Casey (yellow card) 90+'; McInerney 90+'	Report; TV: 6abc	Morgan (yellow card) 21' (yellow-red card) 88'; Agbossoumonde (yellow card) 68'; Earnshaw 71'; O'Dea (yellow card) 74'; Ephraim (yellow card) 74'; Bendik (yellow card) 80'	Stadium: PPL Park; Attendance: 17,182; Referee: Sorin Stoica

April 21, 2013 7	D.C. United	2–3	Philadelphia Union	Washington, D.C.
5:00 PM ET	Kitchen 17'; Pajoy 47'; Jaković (yellow card) 66'	Report; TV: ESPN2	McInerney 7', 26'; Casey 11'; Casey (yellow card) 90+'	Stadium: RFK Stadium; Attendance: 12,349; Referee: Hilario Grajeda

April 27, 2013 8	New England Revolution	2–0	Philadelphia Union	Foxborough, Massachusetts
7:30 PM ET	Fagúndez 61'; Nguyen 71'	Report; TV: TCN	Kléberson (yellow card) 82'	Stadium: Gillette Stadium; Attendance: 18,383; Referee: Baldomero Toledo

May 4, 2013 9	Philadelphia Union	2–2	Seattle Sounders FC	Chester, Pennsylvania
4:00 PM ET	M. Farfan (yellow card) 43'; Cruz 50', 51'; G. Farfan (yellow card) 81'; Williams (red card) 85'	Report; TV: 6abc	Johnson 10'; Rosales 64'; Neagle (red card) 84'; Yedlin (red card) 90+'; Johnson (yellow card) 90+'	Stadium: PPL Park; Attendance: 18,344; Referee: Jorge Gonzalez

May 11, 2013 10	Chicago Fire	0–1	Philadelphia Union	Bridgeview, Illinois
12:30 PM CT	Duka (yellow card) 62'	Report; TV: NBCSN	McInerney 75'	Stadium: Toyota Park; Attendance: 12,205; Referee: Armando Villarreal

May 15, 2013 11	Philadelphia Union	1–4	Los Angeles Galaxy	Chester, Pennsylvania
7:00 PM ET	Okugo 23'; Soumaré (yellow card) 53'; Gaddis (yellow card) 68'; Okugo (yellow card) 90+'	Report; TV: CSN	MacMath 3' (o.g.); Keane 71'; Jiménez 80'; Franklin (yellow card) 85'; Donovan 87'	Stadium: PPL Park; Attendance: 17,031; Referee: Ismail Elfath

May 18, 2013 12	Philadelphia Union	1–0	Chicago Fire	Chester, Pennsylvania
7:30 PM ET	McInerney 3'; Carroll (yellow card) 56'; Williams (yellow card) 73'; Casey (yellow card) 90+'	Report; TV: TCN	Thompson (yellow card) 14' (yellow-red card) 63'; Anibaba (yellow card) 57'	Stadium: PPL Park; Attendance: 18,575 (SO); Referee: David Gantar

May 25, 2013 13	Montreal Impact	5–3	Philadelphia Union	Montreal, Quebec, Canada
7:00 PM ET	Di Vaio 2', 28', 32'; Di Vaio (yellow card) 29'; Felipe (yellow card) 70'; Wenger 74'; Smith (yellow card) 90+'; Smith 90+'	Report; TV: TCN	McInerney 5'; M. Farfan (yellow card) 44'; Hoppenot 69'; Le Toux 85'	Stadium: Saputo Stadium; Attendance: 17,104; Referee: Juan Guzman

June 1, 2013 14	Toronto FC	1–1	Philadelphia Union	Toronto, Ontario, Canada
6:00 PM ET	Henry (yellow card) 27' (yellow-red card) 41'; Osorio 66'; Laba (yellow card) 77'	Report; TV: TCN	Carroll (yellow card) 25'; MacMath (yellow card) 27'; Parke (yellow card) 84'; McInerney 90+'	Stadium: BMO Field; Attendance: 19,221; Referee: Geoff Gamble

June 5, 2013 15	Philadelphia Union	3–0	Columbus Crew	Chester, Pennsylvania
7:30 PM ET	Carroll 25'; Williams 29'; Casey 31'; Gaddis (yellow card) 59'	Report; TV: CSN	Tchani (yellow card) 75'	Stadium: PPL Park; Attendance: 16,113; Referee: Silviu Petrescu

June 23, 2013 16	Philadelphia Union	3–0	New York Red Bulls	Chester, Pennsylvania
5:00 PM ET	Casey 7', 64'; M. Farfan (yellow card) 42'; Hoppenot 88'	Report; TV: ESPN	Sam (red card) 28'	Stadium: PPL Park; Attendance: 19,013 (SO); Referee: Baldomero Toledo

June 29, 2013 17	Philadelphia Union	2–2	FC Dallas	Chester, Pennsylvania
5:30 PM ET	Okugo 20'; Carroll (yellow card) 55'; Casey (yellow card) 76'; Hoppenot (yellow card) 78'; Wheeler 87'; Albright (yellow card) 90+'	Report; TV: NBCSN	Castillo (yellow card) 2'; Zimmerman 23'; Jackson (yellow card) 37'; Watson (yellow card) 46' (yellow-red card) 68'; Pérez (yellow card) 90+'; Pérez 90+'	Stadium: PPL Park; Attendance: 18,212; Referee: Allen Chapman

July 3, 2013 18	Real Salt Lake	2–2	Philadelphia Union	Salt Lake City, Utah
8:00 PM MT	Palmer (red card) 59'; Gil 75'; Wingert (yellow card) 90+'; Morales 90+' (pen.)	Report; TV: TCN	Le Toux 13'; Carroll (yellow card) 33'; Casey 76'; Wheeler (yellow card) 90+'	Stadium: Rio Tinto Stadium; Attendance: 20,446; Referee: Ismail Elfath

July 6, 2013 19	Houston Dynamo	1–0	Philadelphia Union	Houston, Texas
8:00 PM CT	Boniek (yellow card) 45'; Clark 59'	Report; TV: CSN	Parke (yellow card) 44'	Stadium: BBVA Compass Stadium; Attendance: 21,300; Referee: Matthew Foerster

July 12, 2013 20	Philadelphia Union	3–1	Chivas USA	Chester, Pennsylvania
7:30 PM ET	Okugo (yellow card) 56'; Carroll 58'; M. Farfan 82'; Casey 89'	Report; TV: TCN	Correa 14'; Soto (yellow card) 21' (yellow-red card) 79'; Vílchez (yellow card) 35'; Delgado (yellow card) 42'	Stadium: PPL Park; Attendance: 15,172; Referee: Jorge Gonzalez

July 20, 2013 21	Philadelphia Union	0–0	Portland Timbers	Chester, Pennsylvania
7:30 PM ET	Casey (yellow card) 43'; Fernandes (yellow card) 76'	Report; TV: CSN		Stadium: PPL Park; Attendance: 18,740 (SO); Referee: Ricardo Salazar

July 27, 2013 22	Vancouver Whitecaps FC	0–1	Philadelphia Union	Vancouver, British Columbia, Canada
4:00 PM PT	Davidson (red card) 8'; Leverón (yellow card) 59'; Koffie (yellow card) 73'	Report; TV: TCN	Daniel (yellow card) 9'; McInerney (yellow card) 25'; Cruz (yellow card) 65'; Hoppenot 85'	Stadium: BC Place; Attendance: 21,000; Referee: Baldomero Toledo

August 3, 2013 23	Philadelphia Union	1–2	Chicago Fire	Chester, Pennsylvania
8:00 PM ET	Williams 60'; Hoppenot (yellow card) 88'	Report; TV: CSN	Nyarko 9'; Anibaba (yellow card) 16'; Alex (yellow card) 40'; Magee 75'	Stadium: PPL Park; Attendance: 18,295; Referee: David Gantar

August 10, 2013 24	Philadelphia Union	2–0	D.C. United	Chester, Pennsylvania
8:00 PM ET	Casey 35', 75'; Okugo (yellow card) 56'; Williams (yellow card) 61'; Cruz (yellow card) 62'	Report; TV: NBCSN	Riley (yellow card) 81'	Stadium: PPL Park; Attendance: 18,652 (SO); Referee: Hilario Grajeda

August 17, 2013 25	New York Red Bulls	0–0	Philadelphia Union	Harrison, New Jersey
8:00 PM ET	Espindola (yellow card) 29'	Report; TV: NBCSN		Stadium: Red Bull Arena; Attendance: 25,355; Referee: Jair Marrufo

August 25, 2013 26	New England Revolution	5–1	Philadelphia Union	Foxborough, Massachusetts
7:30 PM ET	Rowe 26', 65'; Agudelo 58', 73'; Fagundez 71'	Report; TV: CSN	Lahoud (yellow card) 37'; Cruz 50'; Okugo (yellow card) 75' (yellow-red card) 90+'; Williams (yellow card) 78'; Casey (yellow card) 81'	Stadium: Gillette Stadium; Attendance: 12,531; Referee: Allen Chapman

August 31, 2013 27	Philadelphia Union	0–0	Montreal Impact	Chester, Pennsylvania
7:30 PM ET		Report; TV: TCN		Stadium: PPL Park; Attendance: 18,339; Referee: Edvin Jurisevic

September 8, 2013 28	San Jose Earthquakes	1–0	Philadelphia Union	San Jose, California
8:00 PM PT	Salinas 15'; Baca (yellow card) 45' (yellow-red card) 57'; Gordon (yellow card) 63'; Lenhart (yellow card) 90+'	TV: ESPN2	Cruz (yellow card) 15'; McInerney (yellow card) 20'; Daniel (yellow card) 36'	Stadium: Buck Shaw Stadium; Attendance: 10,034; Referee: Fotis Bazakos

September 14, 2013 29	Philadelphia Union	0 - 1	Houston Dynamo	Chester, Pennsylvania
7:30 PM ET	Okugo (yellow card) 85'	Report TV: CSN	Clark 53'	Stadium: PPL Park; Attendance: 18,771 (SO); Referee: Mark Kadlecik

September 27, 2013 30	Sporting Kansas City	0 - 1	Philadelphia Union	Kansas City, Kansas
7:00 PM CT	Uri (yellow card) 34'; Feilhaber (yellow card) 74'; Opara (yellow card) 89'	Report TV: NBCSN	Casey 36'; Carroll (yellow card) 70'; Williams (yellow card) 82'	Stadium: Sporting Park; Attendance: 19,243 (SO); Referee: Ricardo Salazar

October 5, 2013 31	Philadelphia Union	1 - 0	Toronto FC	Chester, Pennsylvania
7:30 PM ET	McInerney (yellow card) 41'; Fabinho (red card) 71'; Williams (yellow card) 73'; Kleberson 90+'	Report TV: CSN	Morgan (yellow card) 47'; Rey (yellow card) 71'; Hall (yellow card) 86'; Joe Bendik (yellow card) 86' (yellow-red card) 90+'	Stadium: PPL Park; Attendance: 18,996 (SO); Referee: Armando Villarreal

October 12, 2013 32	D.C. United	1 - 1	Philadelphia Union	Washington, D.C.
7:00 PM ET	DeLeon 36'	Report TV: TCN	M. Farfan (yellow card) 79'; McInerney 90'; McInerney (yellow card) 90'	Stadium: RFK Stadium; Attendance: 11,213; Referee: Edvin Jurisevic

October 19, 2013 33	Montreal Impact	2 - 1	Philadelphia Union	Montreal, Quebec, Canada
2:00 PM ET	Di Vaio (yellow card) 56'; Di Vaio 64'; Ferrari (yellow card) 78'; Ouimette 84'; Camara (yellow card) 89'; Pisanu (yellow card) 90+'	Report TV: TCN	Fabinho 29'; Carroll (yellow card) 39'; Casey (yellow card) 40'; Okugo (yellow card) 89'	Stadium: Saputo Stadium; Attendance: 18,993; Referee: Silviu Petrescu

October 26, 2013 34	Philadelphia Union	1 - 2	Sporting Kansas City	Chester, Pennsylvania
3:00 PM ET	Casey (yellow card) 41'; M. Farfan (yellow card) 50'; McInerney 88'	TV: NBCSN	Collin (yellow card) 41'; Zusi 47'; Olum 90+'	Stadium: PPL Park; Attendance: 18,462; Referee: Baldomero Toledo

=== U.S. Open Cup ===
The Union, along with the other 15 US-based MLS teams, will enter the U.S. Open Cup in the Third Round.

May 28, 2013 3	Philadelphia Union	2–1	Ocean City Nor'easters	Chester, Pennsylvania
7:30 PM ET	McInerney 50'; Carroll 90+'	Report	Kollie 90+'	Stadium: PPL Park; Attendance: 6,798

June 12, 2013 4	D.C. United	3–1	Philadelphia Union	Boyds, Maryland
7:00 PM EDT	De Rosario 24', 75', 85'	Report	Okugo (yellow card) 46'; Fernandes (yellow card) 56'; McInerney 76'	Stadium: Maryland SoccerPlex; Attendance: 3,000; Referee: Kevin Terry, Jr.

=== Friendlies ===
March 23, 2013 1	Philadelphia Union	1–0	Pumas UNAM	Chester, Pennsylvania
5:00 PM ET	Fernandes (yellow card) 66'; Carroll (yellow card) 67'; M. Farfan 68'; Williams (yellow card) 77'	Report	Palacios (yellow card) 39'; Espinosa (yellow card) 78'; Nieto (yellow card) 83'	Stadium: PPL Park; Referee: Daniel Fitzgerald

June 7, 2013 2	Reading United	0–2	Philadelphia Union	Reading, Pennsylvania
7:00 PM ET		Report	Kassel (yellow card) 26'; Wheeler 30'; Hoppenot 35'; Hernández (yellow card) 59'	Stadium: Don Thomas Stadium

June 18, 2013 3	Harrisburg City Islanders	2–4	Philadelphia Union	Harrisburg, Pennsylvania
7:00 PM ET	Basso 13' (pen.); Touray 60'	Report	Carroll 4'; Le Toux 19'; Hoppenot 69'; Torres 90'	Stadium: Skyline Sports Complex

July 30, 2013 4	Philadelphia Union	0–2	Stoke City F.C.	Chester, Pennsylvania
7:30 PM ET	Kassel (yellow card) 27'	Report	Kightly 4'; Shea 19'	Stadium: PPL Park; Attendance: 8,000

=== MLS Reserve League ===
The Union have chosen to affiliate with the USL-Pro's Harrisburg City Islanders and as such, will not field a reserve team this season.

== League table ==
Conference

Pos	Team	Pld	W	L	T	GF	GA	GD	Pts	Qualification
1	New York Red Bulls	34	17	9	8	58	41	+17	59	MLS Cup Conference Semifinals
2	Sporting Kansas City	34	17	10	7	47	30	+17	58	MLS Cup Conference Semifinals
3	New England Revolution	34	14	11	9	49	38	+11	51	MLS Cup Conference Semifinals
4	Houston Dynamo	34	14	11	9	41	41	0	51	MLS Cup Knockout Round
5	Montreal Impact	34	14	13	7	50	49	+1	49	MLS Cup Knockout Round
6	Chicago Fire	34	14	13	7	47	52	−5	49	
7	Philadelphia Union	34	12	12	10	42	44	−2	46	
8	Columbus Crew	34	12	17	5	42	46	−4	41	
9	Toronto FC	34	6	17	11	30	47	−17	29	
10	D.C. United	34	3	24	7	22	59	−37	16	

Source: MLS

Overall

Pos	Team	Pld	W	L	T	GF	GA	GD	Pts	Qualification
1	New York Red Bulls (S)	34	17	9	8	58	41	+17	59	CONCACAF Champions League
2	Sporting Kansas City (C)	34	17	10	7	47	30	+17	58	CONCACAF Champions League
3	Portland Timbers	34	14	5	15	54	33	+21	57	CONCACAF Champions League
4	Real Salt Lake	34	16	10	8	57	41	+16	56	
5	LA Galaxy	34	15	11	8	53	38	+15	53	
6	Seattle Sounders FC	34	15	12	7	42	42	0	52	
7	New England Revolution	34	14	11	9	49	38	+11	51	
8	Colorado Rapids	34	14	11	9	45	38	+7	51	
9	Houston Dynamo	34	14	11	9	41	41	0	51	
10	San Jose Earthquakes	34	14	11	9	35	42	−7	51	
11	Montreal Impact	34	14	13	7	50	49	+1	49	CONCACAF Champions League
12	Chicago Fire	34	14	13	7	47	52	−5	49	
13	Vancouver Whitecaps FC	34	13	12	9	53	45	+8	48	
14	Philadelphia Union	34	12	12	10	42	44	−2	46	
15	FC Dallas	34	11	12	11	48	52	−4	44	
16	Columbus Crew	34	12	17	5	42	46	−4	41	
17	Toronto FC	34	6	17	11	30	47	−17	29	
18	Chivas USA	34	6	20	8	30	67	−37	26	
19	D.C. United	34	3	24	7	22	59	−37	16	CONCACAF Champions League

Source: MLS
Rules for classification: 1) points; 2) head-to-head record; 3) goal difference; 4) number of goals scored
(C) MLS Cup Champion; (S) Supporters' Shield

=== Results summary ===
Overall								Home						Away					
Pld	Pts	W	L	T	GF	GA	GD	W	L	T	GF	GA	GD	W	L	T	GF	GA	GD
34	46	12	12	10	42	44	−2	7	5	5	23	18	+5	5	7	5	19	26	−7

Last updated: October 27, 2013
Pld = Matches played; Pts = Points; W = Matches won; T = Matches tied; L = Matches lost; GF = Goals for; GA = Goals against; GD = Goal difference

Round	1	2	3	4	5	6	7	8	9	10	11	12	13	14	15	16	17	18	19	20	21	22	23	24	25	26	27	28	29	30	31	32	33	34
Stadium	H	A	H	A	A	H	A	A	H	A	H	H	A	A	H	H	H	A	A	H	H	A	H	H	A	A	H	A	H	A	H	A	A	H
Result	L	W	W	L	T	T	W	L	T	W	L	W	L	T	W	W	T	T	L	W	T	W	L	W	T	L	T	L	L	W	W	T	L	L

Updated to match(es) played on October 27, 2013. Source: MLS Results and League table
A = Away; H = Home; W = Win; L = Loss; T = Tie

== Coaching staff ==
Position	Staff	Nation
Manager	John Hackworth	United States
Technical Director/Assistant Coach/Goalkeeper Coach	Rob Vartughian	United States
Assistant Coach/Reserve Team Head Coach	Brendan Burke	(Republic of Ireland) Ireland
Assistant Coach	Jim Curtin	United States
Director of International Player Development	Ricardo Ansaldi	Argentina
Head Athletic Trainer	Paul Rushing	United States
Assistant Athletic Trainer	Steve Hudyma	United States
Strength and Conditioning Coach	Kevin Miller	United States
Team Coordinator	Josh Gros	United States
Academy Director	Tommy Wilson	Scotland
Equipment Director	Tim Cook	United States

== Squad information ==
=== Squad breakdown ===
Ages are as of March 1, 2013.

No.	Name	Nationality	Position	Date of birth (age)	Signed From
Goalkeepers
18	Zac MacMath	(United States)	GK	August 7, 1991 (age 35)	(United States) University of Maryland
39	Oka Nikolov	(North Macedonia)	GK	May 25, 1974 (age 52)	(Germany) Eintracht Frankfurt
Defenders
3	Chris Albright	(United States)	RB	January 14, 1979 (age 47)	(United States) New York Red Bulls
8	Matt Kassel	(United States)	DF/MF	October 30, 1989 (age 36)	(United States) Pittsburgh Riverhounds
14	Amobi Okugo	(United States)	DM/CB	March 13, 1991 (age 35)	(United States) UCLA
16	Don Anding	(United States)	LB	May 31, 1991 (age 35)	(United States) Northeastern University
25	Sheanon Williams	(United States)	RB	March 17, 1990 (age 36)	(United States) Harrisburg City Islanders
28	Ray Gaddis	(United States)	RB	January 13, 1990 (age 36)	(United States) West Virginia University
31	Jeff Parke	(United States)	CB	March 23, 1982 (age 44)	(United States) Seattle Sounders FC
33	Fabinho	(Brazil)	LB	March 16, 1985 (age 41)	(Australia) Sydney FC
Midfielders
7	Brian Carroll	(United States)	DM	July 20, 1981 (age 45)	(United States) Columbus Crew
10	Roger Torres	(Colombia)	AM	July 13, 1991 (age 35)	(Colombia) América de Cali
13	Michael Lahoud	(United States)	MF	September 15, 1986 (age 39)	(United States) Chivas USA
19	Kléberson	(Brazil)	MF	June 19, 1979 (age 47)	(Brazil) Bahia
21	Michael Farfan	(United States)	LW/RW/AM	June 23, 1988 (age 38)	(United States) University of North Carolina at Chapel Hill
22	Leo Fernandes	(United States)	MF	December 23, 1991 (age 34)	(United States) Stony Brook University
26	Keon Daniel	(Trinidad and Tobago)	LW/RW	January 16, 1987 (age 39)	Puerto Rico Islanders
40	Gilberto	(Brazil)	MF	October 20, 1988 (age 37)	(Brazil) Atlético Sorocaba
44	Danny Cruz	(United States)	MF	January 3, 1990 (age 36)	(United States) D.C. United
Forwards
6	Conor Casey	(United States)	ST	July 25, 1981 (age 45)	(United States) Colorado Rapids
9	Jack McInerney	(United States)	ST	August 5, 1992 (age 34)	(United States) Cobb Futbol Club
11	Sebastien Le Toux	(France)	ST	January 10, 1984 (age 42)	(United States) New York Red Bulls
12	Aaron Wheeler	(United States)	ST	May 11, 1988 (age 38)	(Finland) KooTeePee
17	Yann Ekra	(Ivory Coast)	ST	December 10, 1990 (age 35)	(United States) Harrisburg City Islanders
29	Antoine Hoppenot	(United States)	ST	November 23, 1990 (age 35)	(United States) Princeton University

Last updated: October 1, 2013.
Source: Philadelphia Union

=== Statistics ===
Statistics are from all MLS league matches.

Nat.	No.	Player	Pos.	Apps	Starts	G	A	Booked	Sent off (straight red)	Acquired	Salary	Cap Number
(United States)	3	Chris Albright	DF	2	0	0	0	1	0	Signed	$75,000	$75,000
(Mali)	4	*Bakary Soumaré	DF	3	3	0	0	1	0	Signed	$310,000	$123,529
(United States)	5	*Greg Jordan	MF	0	0	0	0	0	0	SuperDraft	$46,500	$0
(United States)	6	Conor Casey	FW	31	25	10	5	9	0	Re-Entry Draft	$175,000	$175,000
(United States)	7	Brian Carroll	MF	33	33	2	1	6	0	Trade	$176,400	$176,400
(United States)	8	Matt Kassel	DF	5	0	0	0	0	0	Signed	$46,500	$0
(United States)	9	Jack McInerney	FW	31	25	12	0	4	0	SuperDraft	$125,500	$189,667
(Colombia)	10	Roger Torres	MF	5	0	0	0	0	0	Signed	$121,968	$125,093
(France)	11	Sebastien Le Toux	FW	32	25	3	12	0	0	Trade	$200,000	$212,813
(United States)	12	Aaron Wheeler	FW	10	1	1	1	1	0	Signed	$46,500	$0
(United States)	13	Michael Lahoud	MF	9	3	0	0	1	0	Trade	$90,000	$93,333
(United States)	14	Amobi Okugo	MF	32	32	3	3	7	1	SuperDraft	$101,250	$184,250
(United States)	15	*Gabriel Farfan	MF/DF	6	3	0	0	1	0	Signed	$50,820	$14,948
(United States)	16	Don Anding	DF	1	0	0	0	0	0	SuperDraft	$35,125	$0
(Ivory Coast)	17	Yann Ekra	FW	0	0	0	0	0	0	Signed	$46,500	$46,500
(Brazil)	19	Kléberson	MF	11	7	1	2	1	0	Loan	$495,000	$368,750 (DP)
(United States)	20	*Jimmy McLaughlin	MF	0	0	0	0	0	0	Signed	$60,000	$0 (HG)
(United States)	21	Michael Farfan	MF	29	22	1	1	6	0	SuperDraft	$98,670	$136,170
(United States)	22	Leo Fernandes	MF	7	3	0	0	1	0	Supplemental Draft	$35,125	$0
(Mexico)	23	*Cristhian Hernández	FW	0	0	0	0	0	0	Signed	$62,500	$0 (HG)
(United States)	25	Sheanon Williams	DF	32	32	2	8	6	1	Signed	$105,000	$110,500
(Trinidad and Tobago)	26	Keon Daniel	MF	24	21	0	1	4	0	Signed	$80,004	$82,892
(United States)	28	Ray Gaddis	DF	31	31	0	0	3	0	SuperDraft	$46,500	$46,500
(United States)	29	Antoine Hoppenot	MF	30	2	3	2	2	0	Supplemental Draft	$48,400	$48,400
(United States)	31	Jeff Parke	DF	31	31	0	1	3	0	Trade	$205,000	$216,500
(Brazil)	33	Fabinho	DF	14	10	1	2	0	1	Signed	$78,000	$82,500
(Brazil)	40	Gilberto	MF	0	0	0	0	0	0	Signed	$60,000	$80,000
(United States)	44	Danny Cruz	MF	32	32	3	2	5	0	Trade	$120,000	$126,500
(United States)		*Freddy Adu	MF	0	0	0	0	0	0	Signed	N/A	$368,750 (DP)
						42	41	63	3			

* = Not currently part of team.

Last updated: October 27, 2013.
Source: Philadelphia Union

=== Goalkeepers ===
Nat.	No.	Player	Apps	Starts	Record	GA	GAA	SO	Booked	Sent off (straight red)	Acquired	Salary	Cap Number
(United States)	1	*Chris Konopka	0	0	0–0–0	0	0.00	0	0	0	Signed	$46,500	$0
(United States)	18	Zac MacMath	34	34	12–12–10	44	1.29	12	1	0	SuperDraft	$110,000	$155,000
(North Macedonia)	39	Oka Nikolov	0	0	0-0-0	0	0	0	0	0	Signed	$46,500	$46,500
			34	34	12–12–10	44	1.29	12	1	0			

* = Not currently part of team.

Last updated: October 27, 2013.
Source: Philadelphia Union

== Honors and awards ==
=== MLS Player of the Month ===
Week	Player	Stats
April	(United States) Jack McInerney	4G
May	(United States) Jack McInerney	3G

=== MLS Player of the Week ===
Week	Player	Stats
8	(United States) Jack McInerney	2G (7', 26')

=== MLS Team of the Week ===
Week	Player	Report
2	(United States) Amobi Okugo	
3	(United States) Jack McInerney	
6	(United States) Amobi Okugo	
7	(United States) Jack McInerney	
8	(United States) Jack McInerney	
10	(United States) Danny Cruz	
11	(United States) Zac MacMath	
15	(United States) Brian Carroll (United States) Sheanon Williams	
17	(United States) Conor Casey	
24	(United States) Conor Casey (United States) Sheanon Williams	

=== MLS All-Stars 2013 ===
Position	Player	Notes
FW	(United States) Jack McInerney	Peter Vermes' Pick

== Player movement ==
=== Transfers ===
==== In ====
Date	Player	Number	Position	Previous club	Fee/notes	Ref
December 6, 2012	(France) Sébastien Le Toux	11	FW	(United States) New York Red Bulls	Sign-and-trade deal for Josué Martínez and allocation money	
December 7, 2012	(United States) Jeff Parke	31	DF	(United States) Seattle Sounders FC	Traded for allocation money and a Supplemental Draft pick	
December 14, 2012	(United States) Conor Casey	6	FW	(United States) Colorado Rapids	2012 MLS Re-Entry Draft	
January 17, 2013	(United States) Don Anding	16	FW	(United States) Northeastern University	2013 MLS SuperDraft, 2nd Round	
January 17, 2013	(Ghana) Stephen Okai		MF	(United States) University of Mobile	2013 MLS SuperDraft, 2nd Round	
January 19, 2013	(Trinidad and Tobago) Damani Richards	22	DF	(Trinidad and Tobago) W Connection	Free	
January 19, 2013	(United States) Aaron Wheeler	12	FW	(Finland) KooTeePee	Free	
January 22, 2013	(United States) Eric Schoenle			(United States) West Virginia University	2013 MLS Supplemental Draft, 1st Round	
January 22, 2013	(Trinidad and Tobago) Uriah Bentick			(United States) Liberty University	2013 MLS Supplemental Draft, 1st Round	
January 22, 2013	(United States) Mark Linville			(United States) Princeton University	2013 MLS Supplemental Draft, 2nd Round	
January 22, 2013	(United States) Jake Keegan			(United States) Binghamton University	2013 MLS Supplemental Draft, 3rd Round	
January 22, 2013	(United States) Leo Fernandes	22	MF	(United States) Stony Brook University	2013 MLS Supplemental Draft, 4th Round	
January 24, 2013	(United States) Alex Mendoza	24	MF	(Mexico) UNAM Pumas	Free	
March 5, 2013	(United States) Matt Kassel	8	DF / MF	(United States) Pittsburgh Riverhounds	Free	
June 19, 2013	(North Macedonia) Oka Nikolov	39	GK	(Germany) Eintracht Frankfurt	Free	
June 28, 2013	(Brazil) Fabinho	33	DF	(Australia) Sydney FC	Free	
August 2, 2013	(Brazil) Gilberto	40	MF	(Brazil) Atlético Sorocaba	Free	
September 13, 2013	(Ivory Coast) Yann Ekra	17	FW	(United States) Harrisburg City Islanders	Free	

==== Out ====
Date	Player	Number	Position	Destination club	Fee/notes	Ref
November 19, 2012	(Panama) Gabriel Gómez	6	MF	(Colombia) Atlético Junior	Waived	
November 19, 2012	(Costa Rica) Porfirio López	24	DF	(Costa Rica) L.D. Alajuelense	Waived	
November 19, 2012	(United States) Krystian Witkowski	30	MF		Waived	
December 3, 2012	(United States) Chase Harrison	32	GK		Contract option declined	
December 6, 2012	(Costa Rica) Josué Martínez	17	FW	(United States) New York Red Bulls	Traded along with allocation money for Sébastien Le Toux	
February 4, 2013	(United States) Mark Linnville		DF		Not offered a contract	
February 4, 2013	(Trinidad and Tobago) Uriah Bentick		DF	(United States) Wilmington Hammerheads	Not offered a contract	
February 20, 2013	(Trinidad and Tobago) Damani Richards	22	DF	(United States) Harrisburg City Islanders	Waived	
February 20, 2013	(United States) Alex Mendoza	24	MF		Waived	
February 20, 2013	(Ghana) Stephen Okai		MF	(United States) Charlotte Eagles	Not offered a contract	
February 21, 2013	(United States) Eric Schoenle				Not offered a contract	
March 1, 2013	(United States) Chandler Hoffman	17	FW	(United States) Los Angeles Galaxy	Traded for Conditional 2014 MLS SuperDraft pick	
March 25, 2013	(United States) Freddy Adu		MF	(Brazil) Bahia	Free transfer	
May 15, 2013	(United States) Gabriel Farfan	15	MF / DF	(United States) Chivas USA	Traded for a 1st round 2014 MLS SuperDraft pick and allocation money	
May 23, 2013	(Mali) Bakary Soumaré	4	DF	(United States) Chicago Fire	Traded for a 2nd round 2014 MLS SuperDraft pick and allocation money	
September 13, 2013	(United States) Chris Konopka	1	GK	(Canada) Toronto FC	Traded for a 3rd round 2014 MLS SuperDraft pick	

=== Loans ===
==== In ====
Start Date	End Date	Player	Number	Position	Loaned from	Fee/notes	Ref
March 25, 2013	November 25, 2013	(Brazil) Kléberson	19	MF	(Brazil) Bahia		

==== Out ====
Start Date	End Date	Player	Position	Loaned to	Fee/notes	Ref
January 7, 2013	December 31, 2013	(United States) Zach Pfeffer	MF	(Germany) TSG 1899 Hoffenheim	Year long loan	
January 15, 2013	December 31, 2013	(Colombia) Carlos Valdes	DF	(Colombia) Independiente Santa Fe	Year long loan	

==== Harrisburg Loanees ====
As part of the Union's agreement with the Harrisburg City Islanders, the following players have, at one point or another during the season, been loaned to Harrisburg. The City Islanders must have a minimum of four Union loanees on their roster at any one time.

Player	Position	Fee/notes	Ref
(United States) Greg Jordan	MF		
(United States) Jimmy McLaughlin	MF		
(Mexico) Cristhian Hernandez	FW		
(United States) Don Anding	DF		
(United States) Aaron Wheeler	FW		
(United States) Leo Fernandes	MF		

== Miscellany ==
=== Allocation ranking ===
The Union are currently 5th in the MLS Allocation Ranking.

=== International roster slots ===
The Union have eight MLS International Roster Slots for use in the 2013 season. Each club in Major League Soccer is allocated eight international roster spots per season.

Philadelphia Union International slots
Slot	Player	Nationality
1	Roger Torres	Colombia
2	Keon Daniel	(Trinidad and Tobago) Trinidad & Tobago
3	Kléberson	Brazil
4	Oka Nikolov	(North Macedonia) Macedonia
5	Fabinho	Brazil
6	Gilberto	Brazil
7	Yann Ekra	Ivory Coast
8	VACANT	

Notes:

- Sébastien Le Toux was born in France, but is not considered an international player as he is a permanent resident of the US.
- Antoine Hoppenot and Michael Lahoud were born in France and Sierra Leone, respectively, but both are American citizens.

=== Future draft pick trades ===
Future picks acquired

- On March 1, 2013, the Union traded Chandler Hoffman to Los Angeles Galaxy for a conditional 2014 MLS SuperDraft pick.
- On May 14, 2013, the Union traded Gabriel Farfan to C.D. Chivas USA for a first round 2014 MLS SuperDraft pick and allocation money.
- On May 23, 2013, the Union traded Bakary Soumaré to Chicago Fire for a second round 2014 MLS SuperDraft pick and allocation money.
- On September 13, 2013, the Union traded Chris Konopka to Toronto FC for a third round 2014 MLS SuperDraft pick.
