= 2012 Philadelphia Union season =

Philadelphia Union
2012 season
- Owner: Keystone Sports & Entertainment
- Manager: John Hackworth interim, from June 13, 2012 permanent, from August 30, 2012; Peter Nowak until June 13, 2012
- Stadium: PPL Park (Capacity: 18,500)
- Major League Soccer: Eastern Conference: 8th Overall table: 15th
- MLS Cup: Did not qualify
- U.S. Open Cup: Semifinals
- Top goalscorer: Jack McInerney (8)
- Highest home attendance: 19,074 v Colorado Rapids; March 18, 2012
- Lowest home attendance: 16,024 v D.C. United; September 20, 2012
- Average home league attendance: 18,049; 7 sellouts (Through October 27, 2012)
Home colors	Away colors	Third colors

The 2012 Philadelphia Union season was the third season of the team's existence, competing in Major League Soccer, the top flight of American soccer. The team was initially managed by former MLS player Peter Nowak, in his third season with the club. In June, Nowak resigned and assistant coach John Hackworth was promoted to manager on an interim basis. Hackworth was officially made permanent head coach in August, making him the second head coach in the club's history.

== 2012 roster ==
As of August 28, 2012.

Note: Flags indicate national team as defined under FIFA eligibility rules; some limited exceptions apply. Players may hold more than one non-FIFA nationality.

No.	Pos.	Nation	Player
1	GK	USA	Chris Konopka
2	DF	COL	Carlos Valdés (Captain)
3	DF	USA	Chris Albright
4	DF	MLI	Bakary Soumaré
5	MF	USA	Greg Jordan
6	MF	PAN	Gabriel Gómez
7	MF	USA	Brian Carroll (Vice-Captain)
8	MF	COL	Roger Torres (on loan from América de Cali)
9	FW	USA	Jack McInerney (GA)
11	MF	USA	Freddy Adu (DP)
12	FW	USA	Chandler Hoffman (GA)
13	MF	USA	Michael Lahoud
14	MF	USA	Amobi Okugo (GA)
15	MF	USA	Gabriel Farfan
17	FW	CRC	Josué Martínez

No.	Pos.	Nation	Player
18	GK	USA	Zac MacMath (GA)
19	FW	USA	Jack McInerney
20	MF	USA	Jimmy McLaughlin (HGP)
21	MF	USA	Michael Farfan
22	MF	USA	Justin Mapp
24	DF	CRC	Porfirio López
25	DF	USA	Sheanon Williams
26	MF	TRI	Keon Daniel
27	MF	USA	Zach Pfeffer (HGP)
28	DF	USA	Ray Gaddis
29	MF	USA	Antoine Hoppenot
30	MF	USA	Krystian Witkowski
31	FW	MEX	Cristhian Hernández (HGP)
32	GK	USA	Chase Harrison
44	MF	USA	Danny Cruz

== Match results ==
Win Loss Tie

=== Preseason friendlies ===
February 11, 2012 1	Florida Gulf Coast University	1–1	Philadelphia Union	Deltona, Florida
2:00 PM ET	Goal		Valdés	Stadium: Dewey O. Boster Sports Complex

February 15, 2012 2	University of Central Florida	0–5	Philadelphia Union	Deltona, Florida
1:00 PM ET			Martínez; Mwanga; McInerney; Hoppenot; Hoppenot	Stadium: Dewey O. Boster Sports Complex

February 18, 2012 3	Orlando City S.C.	1–1	Philadelphia Union	Orlando, Florida
7:30 PM ET	Pulis (yellow card) 2'; Campbell (yellow card) 22'; Gallardo (yellow card) 25'; Boden (yellow card) 62'; Bernard (yellow card) 88'; Griffin 90+'	Report	Califf 27'; G. Farfan (yellow card) 75'	Stadium: Citrus Bowl; Attendance: 5,968

February 26, 2012 4	Pérez Zeledón	1–0	Philadelphia Union	San Rafael de Alajuela, Costa Rica
10:00 AM	Bostal			Stadium: Complejo Deportivo Fedefútbol

February 28, 2012 5	Costa Rica U-20	0–3	Philadelphia Union	San Rafael de Alajuela, Costa Rica
10:00 AM			Hoffman; Hoppenot; Torres	Stadium: Complejo Deportivo Fedefútbol

March 1, 2012 6	Belén Siglo XXI	2–0	Philadelphia Union	Belén de Heredia, Costa Rica
10:00 AM	Arnáez (pen); Cordero			Stadium: Estadio Polideportivo de Belén

=== MLS regular season ===
The Union finished 10-18-6 overall, 7-8-2 at home, 3-10-4 on the road.

March 12, 2012 1	Portland Timbers	3–1	Philadelphia Union	Portland, Oregon
6:30 PM PT	Jean-Baptiste 54'; Boyd 66'; Alhassan 76'	Report; TV: ESPN2	Gómez 51'	Stadium: Jeld-Wen Field; Attendance: 20,438; Referee: Baldomero Toledo

March 18, 2012 2	Philadelphia Union	1–2	Colorado Rapids	Chester, Pennsylvania
4:00 PM ET	Gómez (yellow card) 31'; M. Farfan (yellow card) 52'; Pajoy 67'; Torres (yellow card) 90+'	Report; TV: NBCSN	Larentowicz (yellow card) 44' (yellow-red card) 58'; Castrillón 58'; Cascio 62'; Castrillón (yellow card) 74'	Stadium: PPL Park; Attendance: 19,074 (SO); Referee: Mark Geiger

March 24, 2012 3	Chicago Fire	1–0	Philadelphia Union	Bridgeview, Illinois
7:30 PM CT; TV: TCN	Oduro 28'; Grazzini (yellow card) 75'; Gibbs (yellow card) 81'	Report; TV: TCN	G. Farfan (yellow card) 59'	Stadium: Toyota Park; Attendance: 18,075; Referee: Ricardo Salazar

March 31, 2012 4	Philadelphia Union	0–0	Vancouver Whitecaps FC	Chester, Pennsylvania
4:00 PM ET	Gómez (yellow card) 43'; Carroll (yellow card) 56'; M. Farfan (yellow card) 77'	Report; TV: 6abc	Harris (yellow card) 65'	Stadium: PPL Park; Attendance: 17,189; Referee: Elias Bazakos

April 14, 2012 5	Philadelphia Union	1–0	Columbus Crew	Chester, Pennsylvania
3:30 PM ET	Gómez (yellow card) 25'; Gómez 38' (pen.); Carroll (yellow card) 48'; G. Farfan (yellow card) 71'; Martínez (yellow card) 85'; MacMath (yellow card) 90+'	Report; TV: NBCSN	Gehrig (yellow card) 70'; Gaven (yellow card) 78'	Stadium: PPL Park; Attendance: 18,526 (SO); Referee: Michael Kennedy

April 21, 2012 6	Chivas USA	0–1	Philadelphia Union	Carson, California
7:30 PM PT	Moreno (yellow card) 46'; Kennedy (yellow card) 87'	Report; TV: TCN	Adu 40'; Valdés (yellow card) 60'; Pajoy (yellow card) 70'; Williams (yellow card) 73'; Daniel (red card) 75'; G. Farfan (red card) 85'; Nowak (red card) 85'	Stadium: The Home Depot Center; Attendance: 14,127; Referee: Juan Guzman

April 28, 2012 7	Philadelphia Union	1–2	San Jose Earthquakes	Chester, Pennsylvania
7:00 PM ET	Gómez 83'	Report; TV: CSN	Lenhart 76', 90'	Stadium: PPL Park; Attendance: 18,581 (SO); Referee: Baldomero Toledo

May 5, 2012 8	Seattle Sounders FC	1–0	Philadelphia Union	Seattle, Washington
1:30 PM PT	Rose (yellow card) 18'; Rosales 63'	Report; TV:NBCSN	Gómez (yellow card) 78'	Stadium: CenturyLink Field; Attendance: 38,399; Referee: Ricardo Salazar

May 13, 2012 9	Philadelphia Union	2–3	New York Red Bulls	Chester, Pennsylvania
12:30 PM ET	Pajoy (yellow card) 19'; Pajoy 31'; Adu (yellow card) 5' (yellow-red card) 43'; Pajoy 46'	Report; TV: ESPN2	Lindpere 17'; Ballouchy (yellow card) 22'; Lindpere (yellow card) 54'; Holgersson 68'; Cooper 78'; Meara (yellow card) 90+'	Stadium: PPL Park; Attendance: 18,193; Referee: Jorge Gonzalez

May 19, 2012 10	FC Dallas	1–1	Philadelphia Union	Frisco, Texas
7:30 PM CT	Pérez 7'; Jacobson (yellow card) 72'; Pérez (yellow card) 88'	Report; TV: TCN	Lahoud (yellow card) 37'; Gómez 56'; Valdés (yellow card) 62'; M. Farfan (yellow card) 77'; Harrison (yellow card) 79'	Stadium: FC Dallas Stadium; Attendance: 13,272; Referee: Mark Kadlecik

May 26, 2012 11	Toronto FC	1–0	Philadelphia Union	Toronto, Ontario, Canada
4:30 PM ET	Morgan (yellow card) 30' de Guzman (yellow card) 43'; Koevermans 88'	Report; TV: TCN	Gaddis (yellow card) 11'; Pajoy (yellow card) 29'	Stadium: BMO Field; Attendance: 18,227; Referee: Juan Guzman

June 16, 2012 12	Philadelphia Union	0–1	D.C. United	Chester, Pennsylvania
7:00 PM ET	McInerney (yellow card) 26'; Valdés (yellow card) 77'	Report; TV:CSN/Galavisión	Jakovic (yellow card) 58'; Pontius 78'; Najar (yellow card) 81'; Hamid (yellow card) 90+'	Stadium: PPL Park; Attendance: 18,876 (SO); Referee: Ricardo Salazar

June 23, 2012 13	Philadelphia Union	4–0	Sporting Kansas City	Chester, Pennsylvania
7:00 PM ET	McInerney 1'; Carroll (yellow card) 17'; Gaddis (yellow card) 25'; McInerney 42'; Lahoud (yellow card) 63'; Pajoy 81' (pen.); Hoppenot 87'	Report; TV: TCN	Júlio César (yellow card) 22'	Stadium: PPL Park; Attendance: 18,207; Referee: Terry Vaughn

June 30, 2012 14	Houston Dynamo	2–1	Philadelphia Union	Houston, Texas
7:30 PM CT	Davis 19'; Ching 83' (pen.)	Recap; TV: TCN	Daniel 46'	Stadium: BBVA Compass Stadium; Attendance: 19,806; Referee: Fotis Bazakos

July 4, 2012 15	Los Angeles Galaxy	1–2	Philadelphia Union	Carson, California
7:30 PM PT	Barrett 73'; DeLaGarza (yellow card) 90+'	Report; TV: CSN	Valdés (yellow card) 14'; McInerney 45+'; Okugo (yellow card) 70'; MacMath (yellow card) 78'; M. Farfan 90+'	Stadium: The Home Depot Center; Attendance: 27,000; Referee: Armando Villareal

July 8, 2012 16	Philadelphia Union	3–0	Toronto FC	Chester, Pennsylvania
4:00 PM ET; TV:6abc	Gómez 34'; Adu 36'; Hoppenot 78'	Report; TV: 6ABC	Johnson (yellow card) 56'; Frings (yellow card) 77'	Stadium: PPL Park; Attendance: 18,393; Referee: Paul Ward

July 14, 2012 17	Philadelphia Union	2–1	Montreal Impact	Chester, Pennsylvania
7:00 PM ET	McInerney (yellow card) 61'; Pajoy 82'; Valdés 90+'	Report; TV: CSN	Daniel 89' (o.g.)	Stadium: PPL Park; Attendance: 18,544 (SO); Referee: Juan Guzman

July 21, 2012 18	New York Red Bulls	2–0	Philadelphia Union	Harrison, New Jersey
2:30 PM ET	Cooper 43', 58'; Cooper (yellow card) 62'	Report; TV: ESPN	Pajoy (yellow card) 49'; G. Farfan (yellow card) 54'; Hoppenot (yellow card) 90+'	Stadium: Red Bull Arena; Attendance: 21,842; Referee: Hilario Grajeda

July 29, 2012 19	Philadelphia Union	2–1	New England Revolution	Chester, Pennsylvania
7:00 PM ET	Adu 59' (pen.); M. Farfan (yellow card) 67'; McInerney 90'	Report; TV: NBCSN	Sène 12'; Soares (yellow card) 25'; McCarthy (yellow card) 39'	Stadium: PPL Park; Attendance: 18,598 (SO); Referee: Edvin Jurisevic

August 4, 2012 20	Montreal Impact	2–0	Philadelphia Union	Montreal, Quebec, Canada
7:30 PM ET	Wenger 44'; Ferrari (yellow card) 65'; Rivas (red card) 69'; Martins 78'	Report; TV: TCN	McInerney (red card) 69'; Gómez (yellow card) 89'	Stadium: Saputo Stadium; Attendance: 18,535; Referee: Ismail Elfath

August 12, 2012 21	Philadelphia Union	1–3	Chicago Fire	Chester, Pennsylvania
7:00 PM ET	Anibaba 34' (o.g.)	TV: CSN	Rolfe 43'; Friedrich 45+'; Rolfe 56'	Stadium: PPL Park; Attendance: 18,412; Referee: Fotis Bazakos

August 19, 2012 22	D.C. United	1–1	Philadelphia Union	Washington, D.C.
5:00 PM ET	Okugo 71' (o.g.); Boskovic (red card) 89'; Dudar (red card) 90+'; Hamid (yellow card) 90+'	Report; TV: NBCSN	Carroll 8'; Williams (yellow card) 37' (yellow-red card) 90+'; Lahoud (yellow card) 44'; McInerney (yellow card) 70'; Torres (yellow card) 89'; G. Farfan (yellow card) 89'	Stadium: RFK Stadium; Attendance: 12,312; Referee: Mark Geiger

August 24, 2012 23	Philadelphia Union	0–0	Real Salt Lake	Chester, Pennsylvania
7:30 PM ET	M. Farfan (yellow card) 59'	Report; TV: NBCSN	Wingert (yellow card) 58'	Stadium: PPL Park; Attendance: 18,441; Referee: Jair Marrufo

August 29, 2012 24	Philadelphia Union	1–2	Columbus Crew	Chester, Pennsylvania
8:00 PM ET	Valdés 29'; Hoppenot (yellow card) 69'	Report; TV: TCN	Birchall (yellow card) 28'; Williams 41'; Williams (red card) 68'; Gaven 90+'	Stadium: PPL Park; Attendance: 16,568; Referee: Yader Reyes

September 1, 2012 25	New England Revolution	0–0	Philadelphia Union	Foxborough, Massachusetts
7:30 PM ET	Nguyen (yellow card) 58'	Report; TV: CSN	Adu (yellow card) 62'	Stadium: Gillette Stadium; Attendance: 11,841; Referee: Drew Fischer

September 15, 2012 26	Toronto FC	1–1	Philadelphia Union	Toronto, Ontario, Canada
1:00 PM ET	Hassli (yellow card) 23'; Hassli 58'; Hall (yellow card) 84'	Report; TV: CSN	M. Farfan (yellow card) 39'; Williams 85'; Carroll (yellow card) 90+'	Stadium: BMO Field; Attendance: 15,669; Referee: Silviu Petrescu

September 20, 2012 27	Philadelphia Union	0–1	D.C. United	Chester, Pennsylvania
8:00 PM ET		Report; TV: ESPN2	Pajoy 67'	Stadium: PPL Park; Attendance: 16,024; Referee: Baldomero Toledo

September 23, 2012 28	Philadelphia Union	3–1	Houston Dynamo	Chester, Pennsylvania
4:00 PM ET	Williams (yellow card) 20'; Adu 28', 50' (pen.); Martínez 70'; M. Farfan (yellow card) 82'	Report; TV:6abc	Davis (yellow card) 42'; Boniek 44'; Hall (yellow card) 71'; Carr (yellow card) 75'	Stadium: PPL Park; Attendance: 17,666; Referee: Edvin Jurisevic

September 29, 2012 29	Columbus Crew	3–2	Philadelphia Union	Columbus, Ohio
7:30 PM ET	Arrieta 44', 50'; O'Rourke (yellow card) 61'; Gruenebaum (yellow card) 64'; Mirošević 87'	Report; TV: TCN	Okugo (yellow card) 48'; Cruz 65' (pen.); McInerney 86'	Stadium: Columbus Crew Stadium; Attendance: 14,673; Referee: Matthew Foerster

October 3, 2012 30	Chicago Fire	1–3	Philadelphia Union	Bridgeview, Illinois
7:30 PM CT	Berry (yellow card) 45'; Oduro 69'; Franco (red card) 79'	Report; TV: TCN	McInerney 7'; Lahoud (yellow card) 18'; Gómez 67'; Williams (yellow card) 78'; Hoppenot 87'	Stadium: Toyota Park; Attendance: 16,375; Referee: Abiodun Okulaja

October 6, 2012 31	Philadelphia Union	1–0	New England Revolution	Chester, Pennsylvania
7:00 PM ET	McInerney 73'; G. Farfan (yellow card) 87'	Report; TV: CSN	Simms (yellow card) 66'; Guy (yellow card) 86'; Feilhaber (yellow card) 86' (yellow-red card) 88'	Stadium: PPL Park; Attendance: 17,017; Referee: Jorge Gonzalez

October 20, 2012 32	Houston Dynamo	3–1	Philadelphia Union	Houston, Texas
6:30 PM CT	Kandji 5'; Boniek 71'; Davis 75'	Report; TV: NBCSN	McInerney 19'; McInerney (yellow card) 67'	Stadium: BBVA Compass Stadium; Attendance: 22,039; Referee: Mark Geiger

October 24, 2012 33	Sporting Kansas City	2–1	Philadelphia Union	Kansas City, Kansas
7:30 PM CT	Peterson 40'; Sinovic (yellow card) 50'; Joseph (yellow card) 58'; Sapong 82'	Report; TV: TCN	Okugo (yellow card) 3'; McInerney 53'	Stadium: Livestrong Sporting Park; Attendance: 19,428; Referee: Ismail Elfath

October 27, 2012 34	Philadelphia Union	0–3	New York Red Bulls	Chester, Pennsylvania
1:30 PM ET		Report; TV: NBC	Cooper 13' (pen.), 66'; Henry 35'; Márquez (yellow card) 61'; Henry (yellow card) 90+'	Stadium: PPL Park; Attendance: 18,533 (SO); Referee: Chris Penso

=== U.S. Open Cup ===
May 29, 2012 Third round	Philadelphia Union	3–0	Rochester Rhinos	Chester, Pennsylvania
7:30 PM ET	Martínez 5'; Adu 29', 73' (pen.)	Report	Earls (yellow card) 40'; Traynor (yellow card) 52'	Stadium: PPL Park; Attendance: 4,175; Referee: Robert Sibiga

June 5, 2012 Fourth round	D.C. United	1–2 (a.e.t.)	Philadelphia Union	Boyds, Maryland
7:30 PM ET	Dudar (yellow card) 27'; Wolff 45+'; McDonald (yellow card) 13' (red card) 112'	Report	Carroll 45+'; Martinez (yellow card) 64'; M. Farfan (yellow card) 82'; Hoppenot 93'; Valdés (yellow card) 55' (red card) 112'	Stadium: Maryland SoccerPlex; Attendance: 3,276

June 26, 2012 Quarterfinals	Philadelphia Union	5–2	Harrisburg City Islanders	Chester, Pennsylvania
7:30 PM ET	Adu 5' (pen.); McInerney 9'; Pajoy 29', 69' (pen.); Gomez 81'; McInerney (yellow card) 90+'	Report	Ombiji 51'; Langley 54'; Marshall (yellow card) 60'; Langley (yellow card) 74'; Pelletier (yellow card) 78'	Stadium: PPL Park; Attendance: 4,313

July 11, 2012 Semifinals	Philadelphia Union	0–2	Sporting Kansas City	Chester, Pennsylvania
7:30 PM ET	G. Farfan (yellow card) 30'; M. Farfan (yellow card) 52'; Lahoud (yellow card) 56'; Williams (yellow card) 62'	Report	Nagamura (yellow card) 53'; Peterson 65'; Collin (yellow card) 77'; Zusi 90+'	Stadium: PPL Park; Attendance: 8,486; Referee: Jorge Gonzalez

=== Friendlies ===
May 9, 2012 1	Philadelphia Union	2–1	Schalke 04	Chester, Pennsylvania
7:30 PM ET	Pajoy 21'; Hoffman 88'	Report	Escudero 41'	Stadium: PPL Park; Attendance: 5,000

June 9, 2012 2	Reading United A.C.	2–3	Philadelphia Union	Reading, Pennsylvania
7:00 PM ET	Finley 33' (pen.); Wyatt 79'	Report	Hoffman 8'; McInerney 57'; Newnam 74' (o.g.)	Stadium: Shirk Stadium

June 12, 2012 3	Harrisburg City Islanders	3–2	Philadelphia Union	Hershey, Pennsylvania
7:00 PM ET	Pettis 17', 76'; Ekra 55'	Report	Perlaza 45'; Herdling 81'	Stadium: Hersheypark Stadium; Attendance: 820

July 18, 2012 4	Philadelphia Union	0–1	Aston Villa	Chester, Pennsylvania
7:30 PM ET	Okugo (yellow card) 14'; Jordan (yellow card) 90+'	Recap	Delfouneso 43'; Collins (yellow card) 62'	Stadium: PPL Park; Attendance: 17,195

=== MLS Reserve League ===
The Union Reserves are 4-4-2 overall, 3-1-1 at home, 1-3-1 on the road.

April 9, 2012 Reserve 1	Philadelphia Union Reserves	4–2	New England Revolution Reserves	Wallingford, Pennsylvania
10:00 AM EDT	Harrison (yellow card) 17'; Martínez 22', 65'; Okugo (yellow card) 56'; Hoppenot 62'; Hernández 87'	Report	Mansally 19' (pen.), 90+'	Stadium: Chester Park

April 14, 2012 Reserve 2	Philadelphia Union Reserves	0–4	Columbus Crew Reserves	Chester, Pennsylvania
6:00 PM EDT	Hoppenot (yellow card) 43'; Jordan (red card) 45'; Hernández (yellow card) 46'; Pfeffer (yellow card) 84'	Report	Rentería 12', 20', 38'; Grossman 41'; Rentería (red card) 45'; Tchani (yellow card) 51' (yellow-red card) 78'; Meram (red card) 85'	Stadium: PPL Park

May 14, 2012 Reserve 3	Philadelphia Union Reserves	2–2	New York Red Bulls Reserves	Wallingford, Pennsylvania
10:00 AM EDT	Hoppenot 11'; McInerney 46'; Storm (yellow card) 63'	Report	Maduro (yellow card) 33'; Chirgadze (yellow card) 51'; Hines 68'; Ibidgha (yellow card) 81'; Hertzog 88'	Stadium: Chester Park

May 26, 2012 Reserve 4	Toronto FC Reserves	3–2	Philadelphia Union Reserves	Toronto, Ontario, Canada
6:30 PM EDT	Burgos, Jr. 34', 52'; Cordon 65'	Report	McInerney 14', 56'	Stadium: BMO Field

July 21, 2012 Reserve 5	New York Red Bulls Reserves	0–2	Philadelphia Union Reserves	Newark, New Jersey
5:00 PM EDT	Ballouchy (yellow card) 43'; Maduro (yellow card) 85'	Report	Hoppenot 7'; Perlaza 78'	Stadium: Lubetkin Field

August 5, 2012 Reserve 6	Montreal Impact Reserves	5–1	Philadelphia Union Reserves	Montreal, Quebec, Canada
11:00 AM EDT	Nyassi 12', 16', 29'; Brovsky (yellow card) 22'; Jackson-Hamel 71', 78'	Report	Perlaza 15'; López (red card) 63'	Stadium: Saputo Stadium

September 30, 2012 Reserve 7	Columbus Crew Reserves	3–3	Philadelphia Union Reserves	Columbus, Ohio
11:00 AM EDT	Rentería 23'; Vargas 53'; Meram 69'; Grossman (yellow card) 76'	Report	Mkosana 1'; Pfeffer 63'; Hernández (yellow card) 71'; Hoffman 73'	Stadium: Columbus Crew Stadium; Referee: Corey Richardson

October 9, 2012 Reserve 8	Philadelphia Union Reserves	6–0	D.C. United Reserves	Chester, Pennsylvania
2:30 PM	Hoffman 15', 56', 84' (pen.), 90'; McLaughlin 61'; McLaughlin (yellow card) 76'; Martínez 80'	Report	Chabala (yellow card) 76'	Stadium: PPL Park

October 12, 2012 Reserve 9	D.C. United Reserves	1–0	Philadelphia Union Reserves	Washington, D.C.
12:00 PM	King 8'	Report	Pfeffer (yellow card) 86'	Stadium: D.C. United Training Complex

October 17, 2012 Reserve 10	Philadelphia Union Reserves	0–0	Toronto FC Reserves	Wallingford, Pennsylvania
10:00 AM		Cancelled; Union win by forfeit		Stadium: Chester Park

== League table ==
Conference

Pos	Team	Pld	W	L	T	GF	GA	GD	Pts	Qualification
1	Sporting Kansas City	34	18	7	9	42	27	+15	63	MLS Cup Conference Semifinals
2	D.C. United	34	17	10	7	53	43	+10	58	MLS Cup Conference Semifinals
3	New York Red Bulls	34	16	9	9	57	46	+11	57	MLS Cup Conference Semifinals
4	Chicago Fire	34	17	11	6	46	41	+5	57	MLS Cup Knockout Round
5	Houston Dynamo	34	14	9	11	48	41	+7	53	MLS Cup Knockout Round
6	Columbus Crew	34	15	12	7	44	44	0	52	
7	Montreal Impact	34	12	16	6	45	51	−6	42	
8	Philadelphia Union	34	10	18	6	37	45	−8	36	
9	New England Revolution	34	9	17	8	39	44	−5	35	
10	Toronto FC	34	5	21	8	36	62	−26	23	

Source: MLS

Overall

Pos	Team	Pld	W	L	T	GF	GA	GD	Pts	Qualification
1	San Jose Earthquakes (S)	34	19	6	9	72	43	+29	66	CONCACAF Champions League
2	Sporting Kansas City	34	18	7	9	42	27	+15	63	CONCACAF Champions League
3	D.C. United	34	17	10	7	53	43	+10	58	
4	New York Red Bulls	34	16	9	9	57	46	+11	57	
5	Real Salt Lake	34	17	11	6	46	35	+11	57	
6	Chicago Fire	34	17	11	6	46	41	+5	57	
7	Seattle Sounders FC	34	15	8	11	51	33	+18	56	
8	LA Galaxy (C)	34	16	12	6	59	47	+12	54	CONCACAF Champions League
9	Houston Dynamo	34	14	9	11	48	41	+7	53	CONCACAF Champions League
10	Columbus Crew	34	15	12	7	44	44	0	52	
11	Vancouver Whitecaps FC	34	11	13	10	35	41	−6	43	
12	Montreal Impact	34	12	16	6	45	51	−6	42	CONCACAF Champions League
13	FC Dallas	34	9	13	12	42	47	−5	39	
14	Colorado Rapids	34	11	19	4	44	50	−6	37	
15	Philadelphia Union	34	10	18	6	37	45	−8	36	
16	New England Revolution	34	9	17	8	39	44	−5	35	
17	Portland Timbers	34	8	16	10	34	56	−22	34	
18	Chivas USA	34	7	18	9	24	58	−34	30	
19	Toronto FC	34	5	21	8	36	62	−26	23	

Source: MLS
Rules for classification: 1) points; 2) head-to-head record; 3) goal difference; 4) number of goals scored
(C) MLS Cup Champion; (S) Supporters' Shield

=== Results summary ===
Overall								Home						Away					
Pld	Pts	W	L	T	GF	GA	GD	W	L	T	GF	GA	GD	W	L	T	GF	GA	GD
34	36	10	18	6	37	45	−8	7	8	2	22	20	+2	3	10	4	15	25	−10

Last updated: October 27, 2012
Pld = Matches played; Pts = Points; W = Matches won; T = Matches tied; L = Matches lost; GF = Goals for; GA = Goals against; GD = Goal difference

Round	1	2	3	4	5	6	7	8	9	10	11	12	13	14	15	16	17	18	19	20	21	22	23	24	25	26	27	28	29	30	31	32	33	34
Stadium	A	H	A	H	H	A	H	A	H	A	A	H	H	A	A	H	H	A	H	A	H	A	H	H	A	A	H	H	A	A	H	A	A	H
Result	L	L	L	T	W	W	L	L	L	T	L	L	W	L	W	W	W	L	W	L	L	T	T	L	T	T	L	W	L	W	W	L	L	L
Position	16	16	18	18	17	15	15	18	18	18	18	18	18	18	18	17	15	17	14	17	17	16	16	16	17	18	18	14	16	14	14	14	14	14

Updated to match(es) played on October 27, 2012. Source: MLS Results and League table
A = Away; H = Home; W = Win; L = Loss; T = Tie

== Coaching staff ==
Position	Staff	Nation
Manager	John Hackworth	United States
Assistant coach/Goalkeeper Coach	Rob Vartughian	United States
Assistant coach/Reserve Team Head Coach	Brendan Burke	(Republic of Ireland) Ireland
Head Athletic Trainer	Paul Rushing	United States
Assistant Athletic Trainer	Steve Hudyma	United States
Strength and conditioning Coach	Kevin Miller	United States
Team Coordinator	Josh Gros	United States
Equipment Director	Tim Cook	United States

== Squad information ==
=== Squad breakdown ===
Ages are as of April 16, 2012 (the date of their season opener).

No.	Name	Nationality	Position	Date of birth (age)	Signed From
Goalkeepers
1	Chris Konopka	(United States)	GK	April 14, 1985 (age 41)	(United States) MLS Goalkeeper Pool
18	Zac MacMath	(United States)	GK	August 7, 1991 (age 35)	(United States) University of Maryland
32	Chase Harrison	(United States)	GK	April 2, 1984 (age 42)	(United States) Harrisburg City Islanders
Defenders
2	Carlos Valdés	(Colombia)	CB	May 22, 1985 (age 41)	(Colombia) Santa Fe
3	Chris Albright	(United States)	RB	January 14, 1979 (age 47)	(United States) New York Red Bulls
4	Bakary Soumaré	(Mali)	CB	November 9, 1985 (age 40)	(France) US Boulogne
24	Porfirio López	(Costa Rica)	LB	September 10, 1985 (age 41)	(China) Dalian Shide
25	Sheanon Williams	(United States)	RB/RW	March 17, 1990 (age 36)	(United States) Harrisburg City Islanders
28	Ray Gaddis	(United States)	RB	January 13, 1990 (aged 22)	(United States) West Virginia University
Midfielders
5	Greg Jordan	(United States)	CM/DM	April 5, 1990 (age 36)	(United States) Creighton University
6	Gabriel Gómez	(Panama)	CM	May 29, 1984 (age 42)	(Mexico) Indios
7	Brian Carroll	(United States)	DM	July 20, 1981 (age 45)	(United States) Columbus Crew
8	Roger Torres	(Colombia)	AM	July 13, 1991 (age 35)	(Colombia) América de Cali
11	Freddy Adu	(United States)	AM/RW	June 2, 1989 (age 37)	(Portugal) Benfica
13	Michael Lahoud	(United States)	MF	September 15, 1986 (age 39)	(United States) Chivas USA
14	Amobi Okugo	(United States)	DM/CB	March 13, 1991 (age 35)	(United States) UCLA
15	Gabriel Farfan	(United States)	LW/LB	June 23, 1988 (age 38)	(Mexico) Club América
20	Jimmy McLaughlin	(United States)	LW/RW	April 30, 1993 (age 33)	(United States) Colgate University
21	Michael Farfan	(United States)	LW/RW/AM	June 23, 1988 (age 38)	(United States) University of North Carolina at Chapel Hill
26	Keon Daniel	(Trinidad and Tobago)	LW/RW	January 16, 1987 (aged 25)	Puerto Rico Islanders
27	Zach Pfeffer	(United States)	AM	January 6, 1995 (aged 17)	(United States) FC Delco
29	Antoine Hoppenot	(United States)	MF/ST	November 23, 1990 (age 35)	(United States) Princeton University
30	Krystian Witkowski	(United States)	MF	August 17, 1990 (age 36)	(United States) Marist College
44	Danny Cruz	(United States)	MF	January 3, 1990 (age 36)	(United States) D.C. United
Forwards
9	Jack McInerney	(United States)	ST	August 5, 1992 (age 34)	(United States) Cobb Futbol Club
12	Chandler Hoffman	(United States)	ST	August 17, 1990 (age 36)	(United States) UCLA
17	Josué Martínez	(Costa Rica)	ST/RW	March 25, 1990 (age 36)	(Costa Rica) Saprissa
31	Cristhian Hernández	(Mexico)	ST/LW	October 30, 1993 (age 32)	(United States) Players Development Academy

Last updated: August 28, 2012.
Source: Philadelphia Union

=== Statistics ===
Statistics are from all MLS league matches.

Nat.	No.	Player	Pos.	Apps	Starts	G	A	Booked	Sent off (straight red)	Acquired	Salary	Cap Number
(Colombia)	2	Carlos Valdés	DF	34	34	2	0	4	0	Signed	$268,000	$268,000
(United States)	3	Chris Albright	DF	9	4	0	0	0	0	Signed	$55,000	$55,000
(Mali)	4	Bakary Soumaré	DF	1	1	0	0	0	0	Signed	$280,000	$280,000
(United States)	4	Danny Califf*	DF	4	4	0	0	0	0	Signed	$275,000	$275,000
(United States)	5	Greg Jordan	MF	0	0	0	0	0	0	SuperDraft	$44,000	$0 (off-budget)
(Panama)	6	Gabriel Gómez	MF	24	18	6	0	5	0	Signed	$294,702.50	$294,702.50
(United States)	7	Brian Carroll	MF	34	33	1	1	4	0	Trade	$168,000	$168,000
(Colombia)	8	Roger Torres	MF	11	1	0	2	2	0	Signed	$119,285	$119,285
(United States)	9	Jack McInerney	FW	26	19	8	3	4	1	SuperDraft	$140,166.67	$0 (GA)
(Democratic Republic of the Congo)	10	Danny Mwanga*	FW	9	5	0	1	0	0	SuperDraft	$356,250	$350,000
(United States)	11	Freddy Adu	MF	24	20	5	1	2	1	Signed	$519,000	$200,000 (DP)
(United States)	12	Chandler Hoffman	FW	7	2	0	0	0	0	SuperDraft	$91,000	$0 (GA)
(United States)	13	Michael Lahoud	MF	23	20	0	0	4	0	Trade	$84,571	$84,571
(United States)	14	Amobi Okugo	MF/DF	28	25	0	1	4	0	SuperDraft	$173,000	$0 (GA)
(United States)	15	Gabriel Farfan	MF/DF	23	22	0	1	5	1	Signed	$46,200	$46,200
(Colombia)	16	Jorge Perlaza*	FW	2	1	0	0	0	0	Trade	$115,000	$115,000
(Costa Rica)	17	Josué Martínez	FW	18	6	1	0	1	0	Signed	$71,062.50	$71,062.50
(United States)	20	Jimmy McLaughlin	MF	1	0	0	0	0	0	Signed	$57,000	$0 (HG)
(United States)	21	Michael Farfan	MF	33	32	1	5	7	0	SuperDraft	$94,700	$94,700
(Colombia)	23	Lionard Pajoy*	FW	20	16	5	2	4	0	Signed	$195,000	$195,000
(Costa Rica)	24	Porfirio López	DF	5	4	0	0	0	0	Signed	$125,087.50	$125,087.50
(United States)	25	Sheanon Williams	DF	28	28	1	2	4	1	Signed	$90,500	$90,500
(Trinidad and Tobago)	26	Keon Daniel	MF	23	18	1	1	1	1	Signed	$59,410	$59,410
(United States)	27	Zach Pfeffer	MF	2	0	0	0	0	0	Signed	$70,000	$0 (HG)
(United States)	28	Ray Gaddis	DF	19	18	0	1	2	0	SuperDraft	$33,750	$0 (off budget)
(United States)	29	Antoine Hoppenot	MF	26	3	4	1	2	0	Supplemental Draft	$44,000	$0 (off budget)
(United States)	30	Krystian Witkowski	MF	0	0	0	0	0	0	Supplemental Draft	$44,000.04	$44,000.04
(Mexico)	31	Cristhian Hernández	FW	2	0	0	0	0	0	Signed	$54,375	$0 (HG)
(Germany)	38	Kai Herdling*	MF	4	3	0	0	0	0	Loan	$94,002	$94,002
(United States)	44	Danny Cruz	MF	13	13	1	1	0	0	Trade	$106,500	$106,500
						36	23	55	5			

* = Not currently part of team.

Last updated: October 27, 2012.
Source: Philadelphia Union

=== Goalkeepers ===
Nat.	No.	Player	Apps	Starts	Record	GA	GAA	SO	Booked	Sent off (straight red)	Acquired	Salary	Cap Number
(United States)	1	Chris Konopka	1	1	0–1–0	1	1.00	0	0	0	Signed	$44,000	$44,000
(United States)	18	Zac MacMath	32	32	10–17–5	43	1.34	8	2	0	SuperDraft	$135,000	$0 (GA)
(United States)	32	Chase Harrison	1	1	0–0–1	1	1.00	0	1	0	Signed	$44,000	$44,000
(United States)	88	Brian Rowe*	0	0	0–0–0	0	N/A	0	0	0	Emergency Loan (MLS GK Pool)	$33,750	$0
			34	34	10-18–6	45	1.32	8	3	0			

* = Not currently part of team.

Last updated: October 27, 2012.
Source: Philadelphia Union

== Honors and awards ==
=== MLS Goal of the Week ===
Week	Player	Report
18	(United States) Jack McInerney	

=== MLS Team of the Week ===
Week	Player	Report
7	(United States) Michael Farfan (Colombia) Carlos Valdés	
10	(Colombia) Lionard Pajoy	
15	(United States) Amobi Okugo	
16	(Colombia) Carlos Valdés; Head coach: (United States) John Hackworth	
18	(United States) Freddy Adu (United States) Michael Farfan (United States) Jack McInerney; Head coach: (United States) John Hackworth	
19	(United States) Amobi Okugo	
21	(Colombia) Carlos Valdés	
24	(Colombia) Carlos Valdés	
26	(United States) Brian Carroll	
29	(United States) Freddy Adu (United States) Amobi Okugo	

=== MLS All-Stars 2012 ===
Position	Player	Notes
DF	(Colombia) Carlos Valdés	Don Garber's Pick
MF	(United States) Michael Farfan	Ben Olsen's Pick

== Player movement ==
=== Transfers ===
==== In ====
Date	Player	Number	Position	Previous club	Fee/notes	Ref
November 23, 2011	(Tanzania) Nizar Khalfan	22	MF	(Canada) Vancouver Whitecaps FC	Acquired in 2011 MLS Waiver Draft	
December 7, 2011	(Costa Rica) Josué Martínez	17	FW	(Costa Rica) Saprissa	Free	
December 12, 2011	(United States) Jimmy McLaughlin	20	MF	(United States) Colgate University	Signed As Home Grown Player	
December 21, 2011	(Panama) Gabriel Gómez	6	MF	(Mexico) Indios	Free	
December 22, 2011	(Costa Rica) Porfirio López	24	DF	(China) Dalian Shide	Free	
January 12, 2012	(United States) Chandler Hoffman	12	FW	(United States) UCLA	2012 MLS SuperDraft, 1st Round	
January 12, 2012	(United States) Greg Jordan	5	MF	(United States) Creighton University	2012 MLS SuperDraft, 2nd round	
January 12, 2012	(United States) Ray Gaddis	28	DF	(United States) West Virginia University	2012 MLS SuperDraft, 2nd round	
January 17, 2012	(United States) Tom Brandt		DF	(United States) University of Pennsylvania	2012 MLS Supplemental Draft, 1st Round	
January 17, 2012	(United States) Krystian Witkowski	30	FW	(United States) Marist College	2012 MLS Supplemental Draft, 2nd round	
January 17, 2012	(United States) Antoine Hoppenot	29	FW	(United States) Princeton University	2012 MLS Supplemental Draft, 3rd round	
January 17, 2012	(United States) Brandon Zimmerman		MF	(United States) Santa Clara University	2012 MLS Supplemental Draft, 4th round	
January 31, 2012	(Colombia) Roger Torres	8	MF	(Colombia) America de Cali	Loan made permanent	
February 8, 2012	(Colombia) Lionard Pajoy	23	FW	(Colombia) Itagüí Ditaires	Free	
February 13, 2012	(United States) Chris Albright	3	DF	(United States) New York Red Bulls	Free	
February 21, 2012	(United States) Chase Harrison	32	GK	(United States) Philadelphia Union	Free	
March 2, 2012	(United States) Chris Konopka	1	GK	(United States) MLS Goalkeeper Pool	Free	
March 5, 2012	(Mexico) Cristhian Hernández	31	FW	(United States) Players Development Academy	Signed as Home Grown Player	
May 17, 2012	(United States) Michael Lahoud	13	MF	(United States) C.D. Chivas USA	Traded along with allocation money for Danny Califf	
June 6, 2012	(Colombia) Jorge Perlaza	16	FW	(United States) Portland Timbers	Traded for Danny Mwanga	
June 26, 2012	(Mali) Bakary Soumaré	4	DF	(France) US Boulogne	Free, acquired via the MLS allocation process	
August 16, 2012	(United States) Danny Cruz	44	MF	(United States) D.C. United	Traded for Lionard Pajoy and an international roster slot	

==== Out ====
Date	Player	Number	Position	Destination club	Fee/notes	Ref
November 23, 2011	(United States) Justin Mapp	22	MF	(Canada) Montreal Impact	Expansion Draft	
November 23, 2011	(Colombia) Juan Diego González	3	DF		Waived	
November 23, 2011	(Trinidad and Tobago) Thorne Holder	24	GK		Waived	
November 30, 2011	(Brazil) Stefani Miglioranzi	6	MF	None	Contract option declined / Retired	
November 30, 2011	(United States) Chase Harrison	31	GK	Philadelphia Union	Contract option declined	
January 19, 2012	(Ivory Coast) Levi Houapeu	12	FW		Contract option declined	
January 19, 2012	(United States) Ryan Richter	23	MF	(United States) Charleston Battery	Contract option declined	
January 19, 2012	(United States) Morgan Langley	26	MF	(United States) Harrisburg City Islanders	Contract option declined	
January 19, 2012	(England) Joe Tait	2	DF	(England) Darlington 1883	Contract option declined	
January 19, 2012	(Serbia) Veljko Paunović	16	FW	None	Retired	
January 30, 2012	(Colombia) Faryd Mondragón	1	GK	(Colombia) Deportivo Cali	Released; free transfer	
January 31, 2012	(France) Sebastien Le Toux	9	FW	(Canada) Vancouver Whitecaps FC	Traded for allocation money	
February 1, 2012	(United States) Kyle Nakazawa	13	MF	(United States) Los Angeles Galaxy	Traded with a 2nd round 2013 MLS SuperDraft pick for a 2012 international roster slot	
February 6, 2012	(United States) Tom Brandt		DF	(United States) Harrisburg City Islanders	Not offered a contract	
February 6, 2012	(United States) Brandon Zimmerman		MF		Not offered a contract	
February 22, 2012	(Tanzania) Nizar Khalfan	22	MF	(Tanzania) Young Africans SC	Waived	
May 17, 2012	(United States) Danny Califf	4	DF	(United States) Chivas USA	Traded for Michael Lahoud and allocation money.	
June 6, 2012	(Democratic Republic of the Congo) Danny Mwanga	10	FW	(United States) Portland Timbers	Traded for Jorge Perlaza	
August 16, 2012	(Colombia) Lionard Pajoy	23	FW	(United States) D.C. United	Traded with an international roster slot for Danny Cruz	
August 28, 2012	(Colombia) Jorge Perlaza	16	FW	(Colombia) Millonarios	Released; free transfer	

=== Loans ===
==== In ====
Start Date	End Date	Player	Number	Position	Loaned from	Fee/notes	Ref
April 16, 2012	June 19, 2012	(Germany) Kai Herdling	38	MF	(Germany) TSG 1899 Hoffenheim II	Loan until June 30, with option to extend until December 31. Terminated early.	
May 26, 2012	May 27, 2012	(United States) Brian Rowe	88	GK	(United States) MLS Goalkeeper Pool	Emergency loan	

==== Out ====
Start Date	End Date	Player	Position	Loaned to	Fee/notes	Ref
April 19, 2012	April 22, 2012	(United States) Chandler Hoffman	FW	(United States) Harrisburg City Islanders	Made appearances in 2 games	
April 19, 2012	April 22, 2012	(France) Antoine Hoppenot	FW	(United States) Harrisburg City Islanders	Made appearances in 2 games	
June 22, 2012	August 26, 2012	(United States) Greg Jordan	MF	(United States) Harrisburg City Islanders	Loan extended to end of USL PRO season on July 19.	
June 22, 2012	August 26, 2012	(United States) Jimmy McLaughlin	MF	(United States) Harrisburg City Islanders	Loan extended to end of USL PRO season on July 19.	

== Miscellany ==
=== Allocation ranking ===
Philadelphia came into the 2012 season thirteenth in the MLS Allocation Ranking. The allocation ranking is the mechanism used to determine which MLS club has first priority to acquire a U.S. National Team player who signs with MLS after playing abroad, or a former MLS player who returns to the league after having gone to a club abroad for a transfer fee. A ranking can be traded, provided that part of the compensation received in return is another club's ranking.

On June 25, the Union traded their position in the allocation ranking plus allocation money and their first-round pick in the 2013 MLS SuperDraft to Vancouver Whitecaps FC for the top position in the allocation rankings and a second-round pick in the 2013 Draft. The Union then used the Allocation ranking to sign Bakary Soumaré.

=== International roster slots ===
The Union have nine MLS International Roster Slots for use in the 2012 season. Each club in Major League Soccer is allocated eight international roster spots per season, but the Union acquired a ninth from Los Angeles in exchange for Kyle Nakazawa. This ninth slot would eventually be traded to D.C. United along with Lionard Pajoy for Danny Cruz and reverts to the Galaxy at the end of 2012.

Philadelphia Union International slots
Slot	Player	Nationality
1	Roger Torres	Colombia
2	Carlos Valdés	Colombia
3	Keon Daniel	(Trinidad and Tobago) Trinidad & Tobago
4	Josué Martínez	Costa Rica
5	Gabriel Gómez	Panama
6	Porfirio López	Costa Rica
7	Cristhian Hernández	Mexico
8	VACANT	

NOTES:

- Bakary Soumaré was born in Mali but is not considered an international player as he is a permanent resident of the US.
- Freddy Adu, Antoine Hoppenot, and Michael Lahoud were born in Ghana, France and Sierra Leone, respectively, but are all American citizens.

=== Future draft pick trades ===
Future picks acquired: *2013 MLS SuperDraft second-round pick (natural selection) from FC Dallas for Andrew Jacobson.
Future picks traded: *2013 MLS SuperDraft second-round pick (natural selection) and Kyle Nakazawa to Los Angeles Galaxy for an international roster slot.
Future picks swapped: *2013 MLS SuperDraft first-round pick, allocation money, and the twelfth position in the MLS Allocation Order to Vancouver Whitecaps FC for a 2013 SuperDraft second-round pick and the first position in the Allocation Order.
