= Zach Pfeffer =

American soccer player

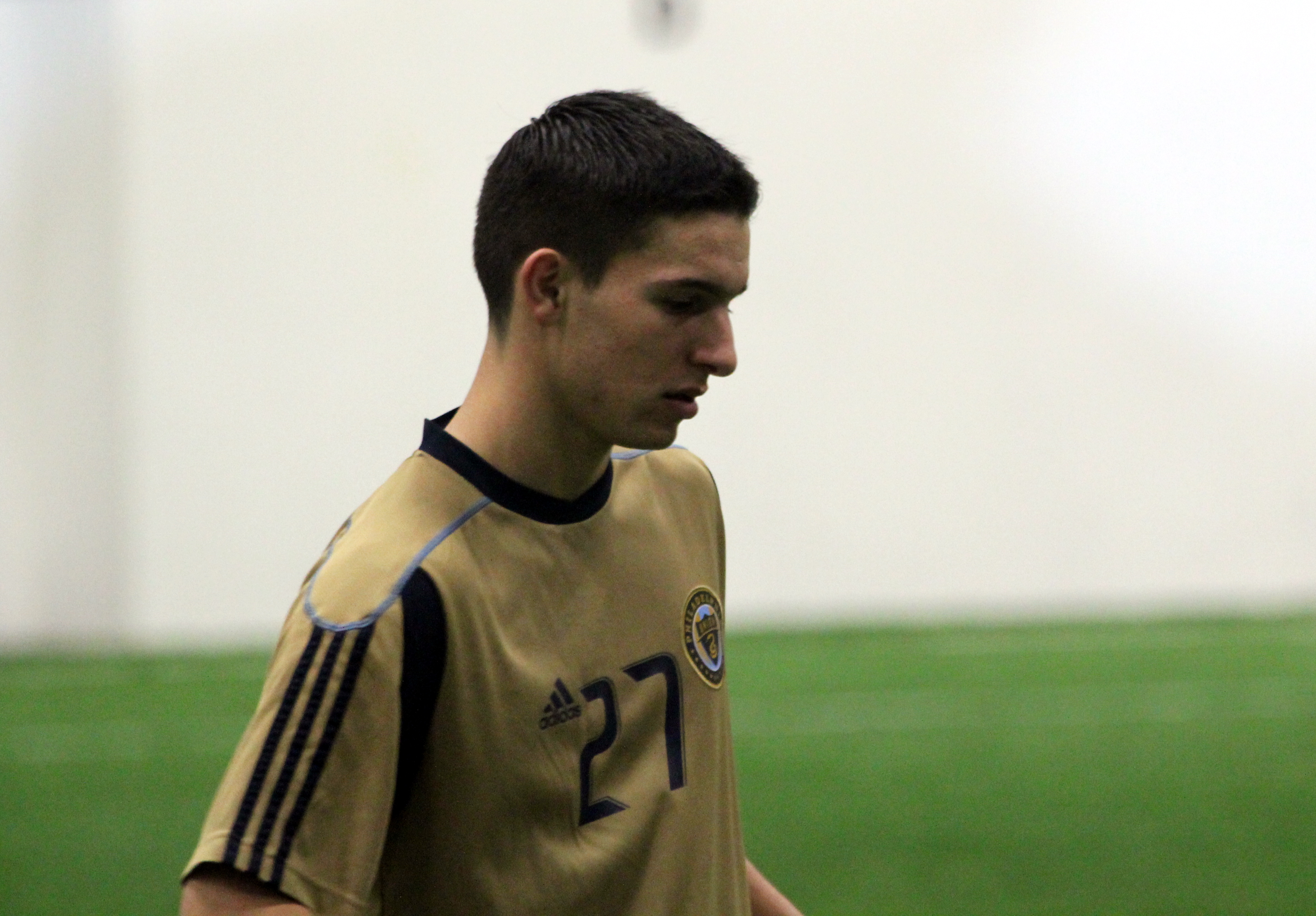
- Pfeffer at 2011 preseason training with the Union

Personal information
- Full name: Zachary Pfeffer
- Date of birth: January 6, 1995 (age 31)
- Place of birth: Dresher, Pennsylvania, U.S.
- Height: 5 ft 7 in (1.70 m)
- Position: Midfielder

Youth career
- 2005–2008: Montgomery United
- 2008–2009: YMS Celtic
- 2009–2010: FC DELCO
- 2010: IMG Soccer Academy

Senior career*
Years	Team	Apps	(Gls)
2011–2015	Philadelphia Union	30	(3)
2013	→ 1899 Hoffenheim (loan)	0	(0)
2014–2015	→ Harrisburg City Islanders (loan)	4	(1)
2016	Colorado Rapids	0	(0)
2016	→ Charlotte Independence (loan)	16	(0)
2016	→ Colorado Springs Switchbacks (loan)	2	(0)
Total		52	(3)

International career^{‡}
2010–2011	United States U17	5	(0)
2012–2013	United States U18	9	(2)
2014–2015	United States U20	12	(5)
2015	United States U23	1	(0)
- * Club domestic league appearances and goals as of September 22, 2016 ‡ National team caps and goals as of June 7, 2015

Zachary "Zach" Pfeffer (born January 6, 1995) is an American former professional soccer player. In 2010 at the age of 15 he became the fourth-youngest player ever to sign a Major League Soccer contract. He retired from soccer in 2016 at 21 years of age.

== Early life ==
Pfeffer is Jewish and was born in Dresher, Pennsylvania. He attended Upper Dublin High School, finishing on time as he played soccer for Union. He played for YMS Celtics, FC Delco Academy along with the Montgomery Maniacs as a young man in Pennsylvania before spending a semester at the U-17 national team residency at IMG in 2010.

After retiring from soccer in 2016 at 21 years of age, as of January 2017, he was a junior at the Fox School of Business and Management department of Temple University; he became an investment banker thereafter.

== Career ==
=== Philadelphia Union ===
Pfeffer then spent several months training with the Philadelphia Union first team and made an appearance for them in a friendly against C.D. Guadalajara on September 1, 2010. Pfeffer was a member of Philadelphia's U-17 squad that competed in the MLS U-17 SUM Cup in Houston, Texas.

On December 22, 2010, the Union signed Pfeffer at the age of 15 as their first-ever homegrown player. He was the fourth-youngest player ever to sign an MLS contract, behind Freddy Adu, Fuad Ibrahim, and Diego Fagundez.

He scored his first goal for the Union in a preseason friendly against UCF on February 14, 2011, off a brilliant, long-range effort. He made his regular season Philadelphia Union debut on September 17 against Columbus Crew, at 16 years of age. In 2015 in 21 games (11 starts) he had two goals and an assist. Pfeffer was one of the longest-tenured Union players when he left the team.

=== TSG 1899 Hoffenheim (loan) ===
Pfeffer was loaned to TSG 1899 Hoffenheim for the whole of 2013, beginning on January 7, 2013. In the 2012–2013 campaign, Pfeffer scored 2 goals in 9 matches playing for the Hoffenheim U-19 side.

=== Colorado Rapids ===
Pfeffer was traded to the Colorado Rapids in January 2016 in exchange for the overall second pick in the 2016 MLS SuperDraft, which was used to draft defender Josh Yaro. In 2014 and 2015 he played in the Major League Soccer Homegrown Game.

He decided to leave soccer, to go to college and then pursue a career in finance. Pfeffer explained: "I sat down and took a look where I wanted to be long-term, and I knew that in a year, five years, 10 years, the financial industry is where I wanted to be. Everything came together nicely with my contract expiring and where I was at academically and where I was professionally.... I looked at where my heart was and where my passions were. Obviously I love the game and I always will, but there was an overriding passion to pursue this next part of my life." Jim Curtin, who had been his manager at Union, said: "I want to say he should still be playing because he’s that talented... It’s too young to have a career come to an end."

=== International ===
Pfeffer represented the United States at the U-14 and U-15 levels and trained at the IMG Academy in Bradenton, Florida, as part of U.S. Soccer's U-17 residency program. On April 18, 2011, he was called up to the U-17 National Team to play in the Mondial Minimes Montaigu Tournament in Montaigu, France, from April 18–26.

Pfeffer was called into the first U-18 National Team camp of 2012 by then-Manager Richie Williams. He was also called up to numerous U-18 National Team camps in 2012. He scored a goal in their November friendly against Canada.

== Career statistics ==
=== Club ===
Club performance			League		Cup		League Cup		Continental		Total	
Season	Club	League	Apps	Goals	Apps	Goals	Apps	Goals	Apps	Goals	Apps	Goals
USA			League		Open Cup		League Cup		North America		Total	
2011	Philadelphia Union	Major League Soccer	3	0	0	0	0	0	–		3	0
2012	Philadelphia Union	Major League Soccer	1	0	0	0	–		–		1	0
2013	Philadelphia Union	Major League Soccer	0	0	0	0	–		–		0	0
2014	Philadelphia Union	Major League Soccer	5	1	0	0	–		–		5	1
2015	Philadelphia Union	Major League Soccer	21	2	2	0	–		–		23	2
Total	USA		30	3	2	0	0	0	0	0	28	3
Career total			30	3	2	0	0	0	0	0	32	3

Updated January 15, 2016

== Career after soccer ==
Pfeffer had taken Penn State online courses during his soccer career, and completed over three semesters of college before he stopped playing soccer. He as of 2020 was an investment banking analyst for Goldman Sachs.

== See also ==
- List of select Jewish football (association; soccer) players
