= Ray Gaddis =

American soccer player

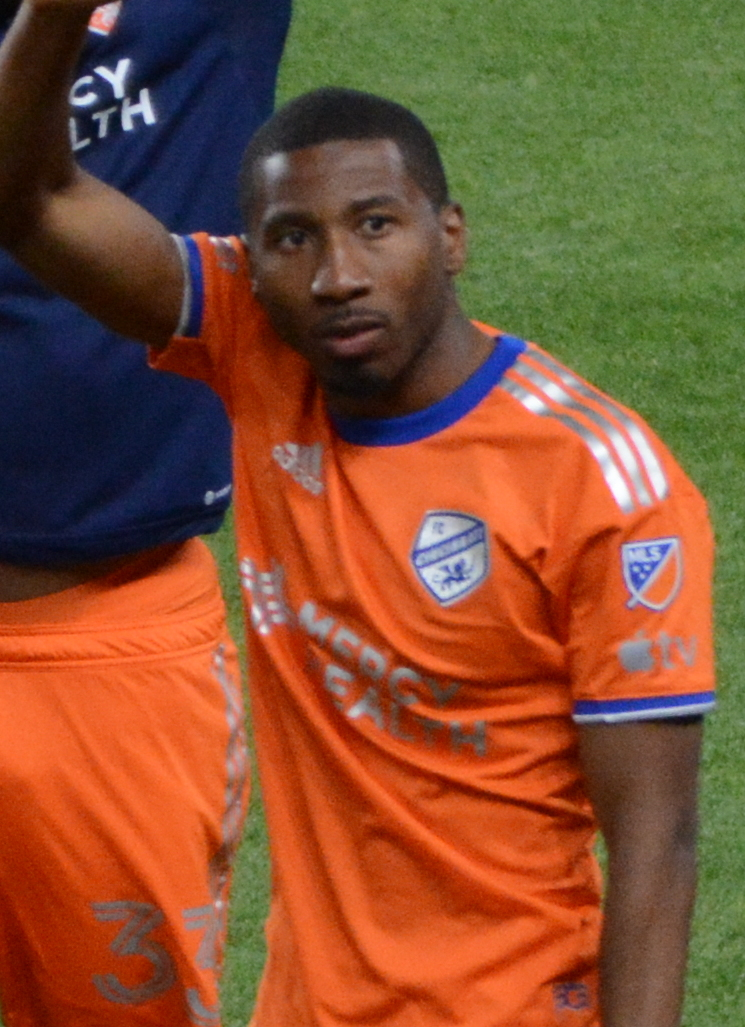
- Gaddis with FC Cincinnati in 2023

Personal information
- Full name: Raymon Gaddis
- Date of birth: January 13, 1990 (age 36)
- Place of birth: Indianapolis, Indiana, United States
- Height: 5 ft 9 in (1.75 m)
- Position: Defender

Youth career
- North Central Panthers

College career
Years	Team	Apps	(Gls)
2008–2011	West Virginia Mountaineers	72	(0)

Senior career*
Years	Team	Apps	(Gls)
2010–2011	Reading United	9	(1)
2012–2020	Philadelphia Union	221	(0)
2022–2023	FC Cincinnati	51	(0)
Total		281	(1)
- * Club domestic league appearances and goals

Raymon "Ray" Gaddis (born January 13, 1990) is an American former professional soccer player who played as a defender.

== College career ==
Gaddis grew up in Indianapolis, Indiana, attended North Central High School, and played college soccer at West Virginia from 2009 to 2011. Gaddis received second team all-Big East honors in his junior and senior seasons respectively. Gaddis was also one of two players to play every minute during the 2010 campaign. Gaddis ended his college career with 6 assists in 73 career games. Gaddis also played for Philadelphia Union PDL affiliate Reading United in 2010 and 2011. During his tenure at Reading, he scored a goal and registered 8 assists.

== Club career ==
Gaddis was drafted in the second round (35th overall) of the 2012 MLS SuperDraft by Philadelphia Union. Gaddis made his MLS Debut on April 14 against the Columbus Crew SC when Danny Califf was a late scratch. On June 23, he recorded his first MLS assist in the Union's 4–0 win over Sporting Kansas City. Gaddis's rookie season finished with 18 appearances, including 17 starts, earning him recognition in the Soccer By Ives 2012 MLS All-Rookie Best XI. His rookie season was further recognized by earning the 2012 NAACP Image Award for Male Athlete of the Year.

During the 2014 season, the Union signed Gaddis to a contract extension through the 2016 season on September 10. Through the 2014 season, Gaddis became a mainstay of the Union's defense, often deployed as a left-back (as opposed to his natural right-sided position). He would finish the season with 34 starts and contributed to the Union's first U.S. Open Cup final. Gaddis was also recognized in 2014 with the team specific FIFA 15 MLS covers where it was reveal Gaddis was chosen as the cover man to represent the Union.

In August 2018, Gaddis became the Union's all-time leader in minutes played after a home win against New England Revolution. Gaddis re-signed with the Union in January 2019, keeping in Philadelphia for an eighth season.

On March 4, 2021, Gaddis announced his retirement from professional soccer, after appearing in 227 matches for Philadelphia. On January 5, 2022, he came out of retirement to sign for FC Cincinnati on a contract that runs through 2023 with an option for the 2024 season. The move reunited him with both Cincinnati head coach and former Union assistant Pat Noonan and general manager Chris Albright, his former Union teammate and later the club's technical director.

== Personal life ==
Gaddis is a Christian. Gaddis is active in giving back to the community. On January 7, 2013, Gaddis represented the Philadelphia Union in Newtown, Connecticut for the "Soccer for Newtown" event. In March 2013, Gaddis and fellow Union members participated in the annual White House Easter Egg Roll.

In 2020, Gaddis took up an instrumental role in the creation of Black Players for Change, an organization of MLS players and coaches intended to help spur political action with peaceful protests and to amplify Black voices and Black communities.

== Career statistics ==
=== Club ===
As of September 4, 2021

Club	Season	League			Playoffs		National cup		Other		Total	
Club	Season	League	Apps	Goals	Apps	Goals	Apps	Goals	Apps	Goals	Apps	Goals
Philadelphia Union	2012	Major League Soccer	18	0	0	0	2	0	—		20	0
Philadelphia Union	2013	Major League Soccer	31	0	0	0	2	0	—		33	0
Philadelphia Union	2014	Major League Soccer	34	0	0	0	5	0	—		39	0
Philadelphia Union	2015	Major League Soccer	28	0	0	0	5	0	—		33	0
Philadelphia Union	2016	Major League Soccer	7	0	0	0	2	0	—		9	0
Philadelphia Union	2017	Major League Soccer	26	0	0	0	1	0	—		27	0
Philadelphia Union	2018	Major League Soccer	28	0	1	0	4	0	—		33	0
Philadelphia Union	2019	Major League Soccer	34	0	2	0	1	0	—		37	0
Philadelphia Union	2020	Major League Soccer	15	0	1	0	0	0	3 (Note: Appearances in the MLS is Back Tournament)	0	19	0
Philadelphia Union	Total		221	0	4	0	22	0	3	0	250	0
FC Cincinnati	2022	Major League Soccer	23	0	1	0	0	0	—		24	0
FC Cincinnati	2023	Major League Soccer	28	0	3	0	4	0	1 (Note: Appearance in the Leagues Cup)	0	36	0
FC Cincinnati	Total		51	0	4	0	4	0	1	0	60	0
Career total			272	0	8	0	26	0	4	0	310	0

== Honors ==
Philadelphia Union

- Supporters' Shield: 2020
- U.S. Open Cup runner-up: 2014, 2015, 2018

FC Cincinnati

- Supporters' Shield: 2023

Individual

- Jerry Yeagley Award: 2020
