= Róger Torres =

Colombian footballer (born 1991)

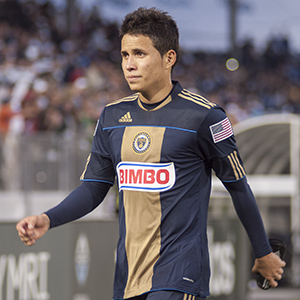
- Torres playing for Philadelphia Union

Personal information
- Full name: Róger Mauricio Torres Hoya
- Date of birth: July 13, 1991 (age 35)
- Place of birth: Barrancabermeja, Colombia
- Height: 5 ft 5 in (1.65 m)
- Position: Attacking midfielder

Team information
- Current team: Deportivo Moquegua

Youth career
- Envigado

Senior career*
Years	Team	Apps	(Gls)
2008–2009	Alianza Petrolera	1	(1)
2009–2012	América de Cali	15	(0)
2010–2011	→ Philadelphia Union (loan)	48	(3)
2012–2013	Philadelphia Union	15	(0)
2014–2015	Atlético Nacional	0	(0)
2015	→ La Equidad (loan)	23	(1)
2016–2018	Alianza Petrolera	84	(7)
2019	Junior	11	(2)
2019	Santa Fe	8	(0)
2020	Atlético Bucaramanga	16	(1)
2021	Alianza Petrolera	16	(1)
2021	Ilves	12	(0)
2022–2024	Alianza Atlético	63	(10)
2024	Once Caldas	8	(0)
2025–2026	Deportivo Binacional	17	(3)
2026–	Deportivo Moquegua	0	(0)
- * Club domestic league appearances and goals as of 17 March 2026

Róger Mauricio Torres Hoya, known as Róger Torres (born 13 July 1991) is a Colombian professional footballer who plays as an attacking midfielder for Peruvian Primera División club Deportivo Moquegua.

== Career ==
Torres played for Envigado's youth team before moving to Alianza Petrolera of the Colombian second division. He debuted in February 2008, scoring one goal during that season. On July 16, 2009, he signed with América de Cali of the first division. He started all 15 games that he took part in, debuting against Santa Fe.

Torres then joined Major League Soccer expansion team Philadelphia Union for their preseason leading up to their inaugural season in MLS, and was acquired on loan from América after impressing during his time there.

On April 10, 2010, Torres recorded the first ever assist for the expansion side Philadelphia Union. He did so with a cross put away by Sébastien Le Toux in the fourth minute of play. He scored his first goal for Union almost exactly a year later, on April 9, 2011, just a minute after coming on as a substitute in a game against the New York Red Bulls. Torres won the AT&T Goal of the Week in week 20 of the 2011 season with his stoppage time goal against the Colorado Rapids in 2011.

On January 31, 2012, Torres completed a permanent transfer from América de Cali to Philadelphia Union.

Torres left Philadelphia following the 2013 season.

In January 2019, Torres joined Atlético Junior.

== Career statistics ==
As of 7 January 2025

Appearances and goals by club, season and competition
Club	Season	League			Cup		League cup		Continental		Total	
Club	Season	Division	Apps	Goals	Apps	Goals	Apps	Goals	Apps	Goals	Apps	Goals
Alianza Petrolera	2008	Categoría Primera B	1	1	–		–		–		1	1
Alianza Petrolera	2009	Categoría Primera B	0	0	–		–		–		0	0
Alianza Petrolera	Total		1	1	0	0	0	0	0	0	1	1
América de Cali	2009	Categoría Primera A	11	0	–		–		–		11	0
Philadelphia Union	2010	MLS	21	0	1	0	–		–		22	0
Philadelphia Union	2011	MLS	27	3	1	0	2	0	–		30	3
Philadelphia Union	2012	MLS	10	0	0	0	–		–		10	0
Philadelphia Union	2013	MLS	5	0	0	0	–		–		5	0
Philadelphia Union	Total		63	3	1	0	2	0	0	0	66	3
Atlético Nacional	2014	Categoría Primera A	0	0	0	0	–		–		0	0
La Equidad (loan)	2015	Categoría Primera A	23	1	6	1	–		–		29	2
Alianza Petrolera	2016	Categoría Primera A	17	2	5	0	–		–		22	2
Alianza Petrolera	2017	Categoría Primera A	36	2	6	3	–		–		42	5
Alianza Petrolera	2018	Categoría Primera A	31	3	1	0	–		–		32	3
Alianza Petrolera	Total		84	7	12	3	0	0	0	0	96	10
Junior	2019	Categoría Primera A	11	2	0	0	–		1 (Note: Appearance(s) in Copa Libertadores)	0	12	2
Santa Fe	2019	Categoría Primera A	8	0	1	0	–		–		9	0
Atlético Bucaramanga	2020	Categoría Primera A	16	1	2	1	–		–		18	2
Alianza Petrolera	2021	Categoría Primera A	16	2	–		–		–		16	2
Ilves	2021	Veikkausliiga	12	0	0	0	–		–		12	0
Alianza Atlético	2022	Peruvian Primera División	31	8	–		–		–		31	8
Alianza Atlético	2023	Peruvian Primera División	32	2	–		–		–		32	2
Alianza Atlético	Total		63	10	0	0	0	0	0	0	63	10
Once Caldas	2024	Categoría Primera A	12	0	4	0	–		–		16	0
Career total			319	29	27	5	2	0	1	0	349	34
