= Cristhian Hernández =

Mexican footballer (born 1993)

Personal information
- Full name: Cristhian Hernández
- Date of birth: October 30, 1993 (age 33)
- Place of birth: Guadalajara, Mexico
- Height: 1.80 m (5 ft 11 in)
- Positions: Forward; attacking midfielder

Youth career
- 2008–2009: LA Galaxy
- 2010–2011: Players Development Academy

Senior career*
Years	Team	Apps	(Gls)
2011	Central Jersey Spartans	1	(0)
2012–2014	Philadelphia Union	2	(0)
2013	→ Harrisburg City Islanders (loan)	20	(4)
2014	→ Harrisburg City Islanders (loan)	15	(1)
2015	New York Cosmos B		
2016	UdeG II		
2017	Elm City Express	10	(3)
2018–2019	Cuervos de Ensenada		
2019	Las Vegas Lights	14	(1)
2019	Philadelphia Fury		
2019	Los Angeles Force		
- * Club domestic league appearances and goals as of 3 July 2019

Cristhian Hernández (born October 30, 1993) is a Mexican former professional footballer who played primarily as a forward.

== Career ==
=== High school, youth and amateur ===
Hernández attended Saint Benedict's Preparatory School in New Jersey. In 2011, he led Saint Benedict's Prep to a 24–0 record, a number one ranking and the school's seventh national championship in 2011. He was named to the NJ Star-Ledger’s All-Prep First Team, ESPN High School All-New Jersey State and a top 10 soccer recruit in the nation.

Hernández also spent some time in the U.S. Soccer Development Academy. In 2008–09, he made 24 appearances for the LA Galaxy U15/U16 squad and scored five goals. In 2010, Hernández joined the Players Development Academy (PDA), a Youth Development Affiliate of the Philadelphia Union, and scored 16 goals in 26 appearances for the club on his way to winning USDA U-18 Academy Player of The Year.

Hernández also made one appearance for USL Premier Development League club Central Jersey Spartans in 2011.

=== Professional ===
On March 5, 2012, Hernández signed with the Philadelphia Union as the club's third homegrown player. He made his debut for the club about a couple weeks later, coming on as a sub in a 2-1 home loss to the Colorado Rapids. After failing to make the 2012 MLS Cup Playoffs, Hernández joined La Liga side Real Sociedad for a training stint during the MLS off-season.

On 15 April 2014, Hernández signed for New York Cosmos B.

== Career statistics ==
=== Club ===
Club performance			League		Cup		League Cup		Continental		Total	
Season	Club	League	Apps	Goals	Apps	Goals	Apps	Goals	Apps	Goals	Apps	Goals
USA			League		Open Cup		League Cup		North America		Total	
2012	Philadelphia Union	Major League Soccer	2	0	0	0	0	0	0	0	2	0
2013	Harrisburg City Islanders (loan)	USL Pro	9	3	1	0	0	0	0	0	10	3
Total	USA		11	3	1	0	0	0	0	0	12	3
Career total			11	3	1	0	0	0	0	0	12	3

Updated June 23, 2013
