= Keon Daniel =

Trinidadian footballer

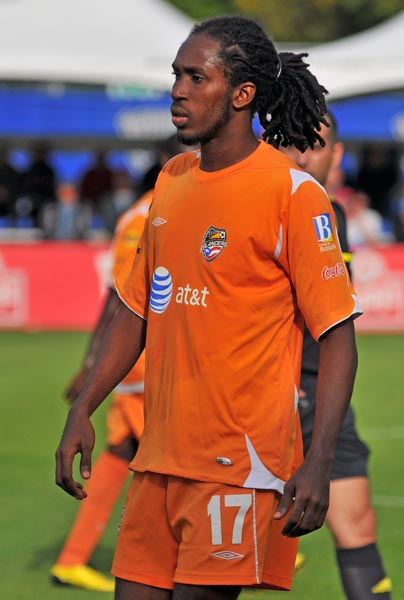
- Daniel with Puerto Rico Islanders in 2010

Personal information
- Full name: Keon Kelly Daniel
- Date of birth: 16 January 1987 (age 39)
- Place of birth: Lambeau, Tobago, Trinidad and Tobago
- Height: 1.86 m (6 ft 1 in)
- Position: Midfielder

Senior career*
Years	Team	Apps	(Gls)
2006–2008	United Petrotrin		
2008–2010	Caledonia AIA		
2010	Puerto Rico Islanders	16	(2)
2011–2014	Philadelphia Union	64	(2)
2014–2017	Miedź Legnica	56	(2)
2014–2015	→ Flota Świnoujście (loan)	7	(0)
2018–2020	GKS Tychy	63	(1)

International career
2007–2013	Trinidad and Tobago	59	(14)
- * Club domestic league appearances and goals

Keon Kelly Daniel (born 16 January 1987 in Lambeau) is a Trinidadian professional footballer who played as a midfielder.

== Career ==
=== Club ===
Daniel attended Signal Hill Secondary School in his native Tobago, and later attended the St Clair Coaching School. After a two-week trial with Manchester United in 2005 Daniel turned professional when he signed with United Petrotrin of the TT Pro League in 2006.

After another trial in England in August 2008, this time with West Ham United, Daniel joined league rivals Caledonia AIA in 2009.

In May 2010 Daniel transferred to the Puerto Rico Islanders of the USSF D2 Pro League. He made his debut for the Islanders on 26 June 2010 as a substitute in a 3–0 loss to the Rochester Rhinos.

Prior to the 2011 Major League Soccer season, Daniel trialed with the Philadelphia Union. Following the successful trial, Daniel signed with the Union on 18 March 2011. In Week 7 of the season, Daniel was named to the MLS Team of the Week for his performance against the San Jose Earthquakes. His first goal for Philadelphia was scored on 11 June 2011 in an MLS game against Real Salt Lake.

After temporarily leaving Philadelphia to play for the Trinidad and Tobago national football team in September 2011, Daniel was forced to remain in Trinidad and Tobago due to an expired visa until February 2012. This incident spawned the "Free Keon" meme used amongst Philadelphia Union fans at live matches and online social networking groups.

=== Miedź Legnica ===
It was announced that Keon Daniel would join Miedź Legnica in the I liga (Poland) from Philadelphia Union in 2014.

=== International ===
Daniel made his debut for the Trinidad and Tobago national football team in 2007. He scored his first senior international goal against Guyana in January 2008 and his second against El Salvador in March 2008, both from free kicks. He was also part of the Trinidad & Tobago squads which competed in the Caribbean Cup in 2008, 2010, and 2012. He was also part of the squads for the multiple CONCACAF Gold Cups, as well as 2010 FIFA World Cup qualification, and 2014 FIFA World Cup qualification. In total, Daniel has made 57 international appearances and scored 14 goals.

=== International goals ===
Scores and results list Trinidad and Tobago's goal tally first.

#	Date	Venue	Opponent	Score	Result	Competition
1	29 January 2008	Ato Boldon Stadium, Couva, Trinidad and Tobago	Guyana	1–1	2–1	Friendly
2	19 March 2008	Marvin Lee Stadium, Macoya, Trinidad and Tobago	El Salvador	1–0	1–0	Friendly
3	8 July 2008	Marvin Lee Stadium, Macoya, Trinidad and Tobago	Guyana	2–0	2–0	Friendly
4	20 August 2008	Estadio Pedro Marrero, Havana, Cuba	Cuba	1–0	3–1	2010 FIFA World Cup qualification
5	20 August 2008	Estadio Pedro Marrero, Havana, Cuba	Cuba	2–0	3–1	2010 FIFA World Cup qualification
6	6 September 2008	Hasely Crawford Stadium, Port of Spain, Trinidad and Tobago	Guatemala	1–0	1–1	2010 FIFA World Cup qualification
7	7 November 2008	Marvin Lee Stadium, Macoya, Trinidad and Tobago	Saint Kitts and Nevis	1–0	3–1	2008 Caribbean Championship qualification
8	19 November 2008	Hasely Crawford Stadium, Port of Spain, Trinidad and Tobago	Cuba	3–0	3–0	2010 FIFA World Cup qualification
9	6 September 2011	Barbados National Stadium, Saint Michael, Barbados	Barbados	1–0	2–0	2014 FIFA World Cup qualification
10	10 October 2012	Warner Park Sporting Complex, Basseterre, Saint Kitts and Nevis	French Guiana	3–1	4–1	2012 Caribbean Championship qualification
11	14 October 2012	Warner Park Sporting Complex, Basseterre, Saint Kitts and Nevis	Anguilla	2–0	10–0	2012 Caribbean Championship qualification
12	14 October 2012	Warner Park Sporting Complex, Basseterre, Saint Kitts and Nevis	Anguilla	5–0	10–0	2012 Caribbean Championship qualification
13	14 October 2012	Warner Park Sporting Complex, Basseterre, Saint Kitts and Nevis	Anguilla	7–0	10–0	2012 Caribbean Championship qualification
14	8 July 2013	Red Bull Arena, Harrison, USA	El Salvador	1–0	2–2	2013 CONCACAF Gold Cup
Last updated 8 July 2013

== Career statistics ==
=== Club ===
Club performance			League		Cup		League Cup		Continental		Total	
Season	Club	League	Apps	Goals	Apps	Goals	Apps	Goals	Apps	Goals	Apps	Goals
Puerto Rico			League		Torneo de Copa de Puerto Rico		League Cup		North America		Total	
2010	Puerto Rico Islanders	USSF Division 2	16	2	0	0	2	0	3	0	21	2
USA			League		Open Cup		League Cup		North America		Total	
2011	Philadelphia Union	Major League Soccer	18	1	1	0	0	0	0	0	19	1
2012	Philadelphia Union	Major League Soccer	22	1	1	0	0	0	0	0	23	1
2013	Philadelphia Union	Major League Soccer	17	0	2	0	0	0	0	0	19	0
Total	Puerto Rico		16	2	0	0	2	0	3	0	21	2
Total	USA		57	2	4	0	0	0	0	0	61	2
Career total			73	4	4	0	2	0	3	0	82	4

Updated 3 August 2013

=== International ===
National team	Year	Apps	Goals
Trinidad and Tobago
Trinidad and Tobago	2008	28	8
Trinidad and Tobago	2009	9	0
Trinidad and Tobago	2010	9	0
Trinidad and Tobago	2011	5	1
Trinidad and Tobago	2012	4	4
Trinidad and Tobago	2013	4	1
Total		59	14

== Personal ==
Daniel's nickname is "Schillaci", after the famous Italian striker Salvatore Schillaci.

== Honours ==
Puerto Rico Islanders

- USSF Division 2 Pro League: 2010
