= Gilberto (footballer, born 1988) =

Brazilian footballer

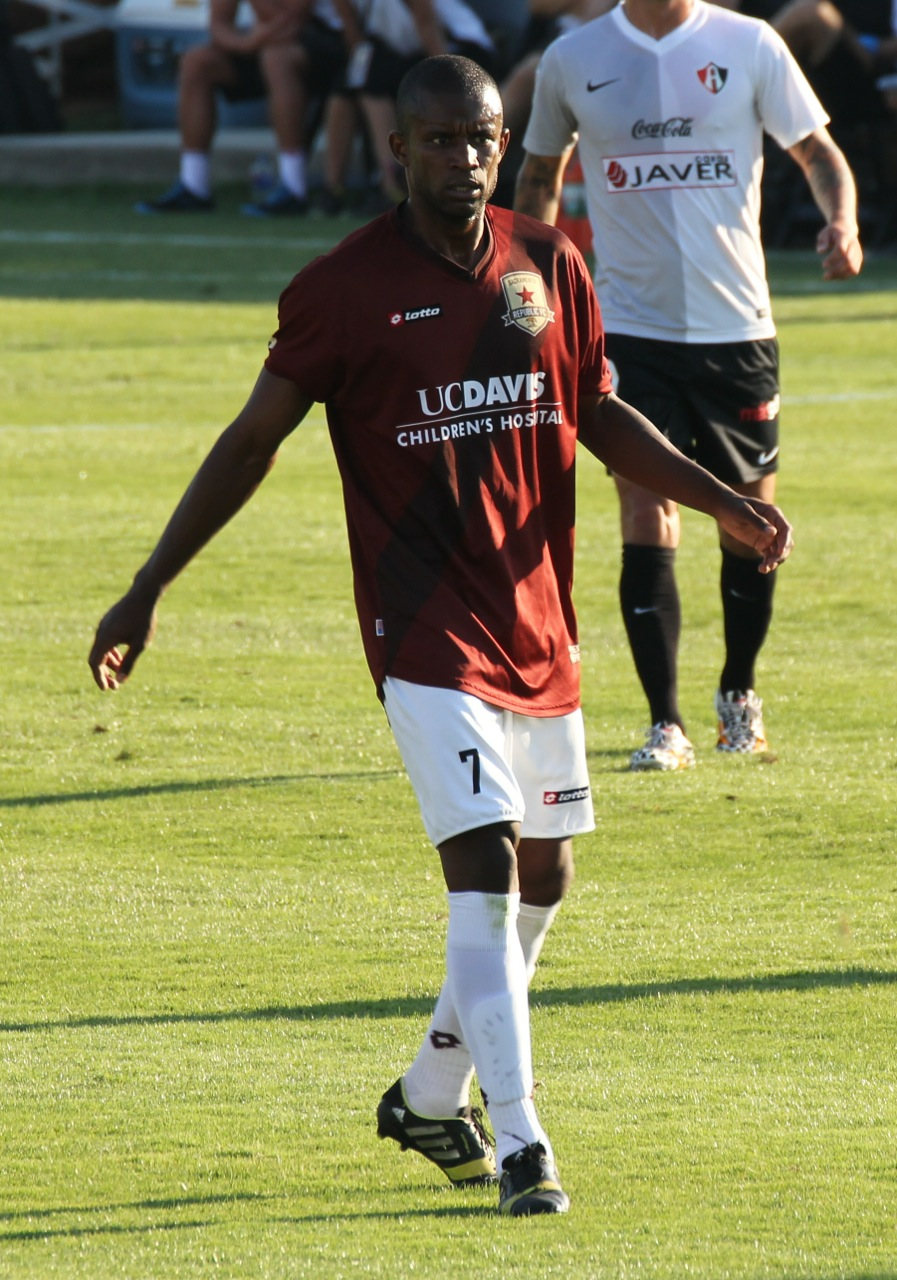

Personal information
- Full name: Gilberto dos Santos Souza Júnior
- Date of birth: 20 October 1988 (age 38)
- Place of birth: Serrinha, Bahia, Brazil
- Height: 1.85 m (6 ft 1 in)
- Position: Defensive midfielder

Team information
- Current team: Atlético de Alagoinhas

Youth career
- 2005–2006: Vitória
- 2007: Bragantino
- 2008: Corinthians B

Senior career*
Years	Team	Apps	(Gls)
2009	Mogi Mirim	6	(0)
2010	Hermann Aichinger	10	(0)
2010	Oeste	2	(0)
2011–2013	Marcílio Dias	18	(0)
2011	→ Atlético Mineiro (loan)	6	(0)
2012	→ América (MG) (loan)	5	(0)
2012	→ CRB (loan)	10	(0)
2013	→ Atlético Sorocaba (loan)	16	(1)
2013	Philadelphia Union	0	(0)
2014–2015	Sacramento Republic	24	(0)
2015	→ Marília (loan)	7	(0)
2016–2017	Casa Pia	31	(3)
2018	Anapolina	7	(0)
2018–2020	Goiás	81	(2)
2021	Confiança	10	(0)
2022	Santa Cruz	19	(0)
2023	Joinville	8	(0)
2023–	Atlético de Alagoinhas	11	(0)
- * Club domestic league appearances and goals as of 23 July 2023

Gilberto dos Santos Souza Júnior (born 20 October 1988) known as Gilberto, is a Brazilian footballer who plays as a defensive midfielder for Atlético de Alagoinhas.

== Club career ==
=== Youth career ===
Gilberto began as a youth team player for Vitória in 2005 before moving to Bragantino in 2007 and to Corinthians B in 2008.

=== Mogi Mirim ===
For the 2009 Campeonato Paulista, Gilberto was acquired by Mogi Mirim and made his debut on 24 January 2009, in a 3–0 loss to Palmeiras. He played 6 games, starting 3 of them.

=== Hermann Aichinger ===
For the 2010 Campeonato Catarinense, Gilberto was acquired and made his debut on 3 February 2010, as he started in a 2–0 win over Brusque. He played 10 games while starting 8 of them.

=== Oeste ===
Later in 2010, Gilberto joined Oeste in Série D. He made his debut on 24 July 2010, as a substitute in a 1–0 win over Esporte Clube São José. He played 2 games that season, starting the other one.

=== Marcílio Dias ===
In 2011, Gilberto joined Marcílio Dias for the Campeonato Catarinense. He started in his debut on 16 January 2011, in his team's 1–0 win over Imbituba Futebol Clube. He was a stand-out in the tournament and played 18 games, starting 17 of them.

At this time, Gilberto's economic rights were held by agent, Eduardo Uram (70%), Marcílio Dias (15%) as well as the player himself (15%). Then, Tombense Futebol Clube acquired Gilberto's economic rights and began a series of loan deals while never having him actually play for the club.

=== Atlético Mineiro ===
After a successful stint in the Campeonato Catarinense, Atlético Mineiro acquired Gilberto on loan on 4 May 2011, for its upcoming 2011 season in Série A. In May 2011, Gilberto made his debut as a substitute for Atlético Mineiro in its 3–0 win over Clube Atlético Paranaense. On 19 June 2011, he made his debut as a starter for Atlético Mineiro in its 2–0 win over Atlético Clube Goianiense. He finished the season playing 6 games, starting 2 of them. On 8 December 2011, Atlético Mineiro decided not to renew the contract of Gilberto.

=== América (MG) ===
On 23 December 2011, Gilberto went on loan to América (MG). In the 2012 Campeonato Paulista, he played 4 games in the Campeonato Mineiro, starting one of them.

In the Campeonato Brasliero, he played one game (as a substitute in a 3–0 victory over Criciuma Esporte Clube) in Serie B before joining fellow Serie B team Clube de Regatas Brasil on loan.

=== CRB ===
On 24 August 2012, Gilberto moved on loan to CRB in Serie B in the Campeonato Brasileiro. He made his CRB debut as a substitute in a 1–0 loss against his former team, América (MG). He played 10 games, starting 8 of them.

=== Atlético Sorocaba ===
Gilberto joined Atlético Sorocaba on loan for the 2013 Campeonato Paulista. He played and started in 16 of the team's 19 games. On 2 March 2013, he scored his first career goal on an 86th minute game-winning penalty kick against his former team, Bragantino.

On 23 July 2013, Gilberto's contract termination with Tombense was filed with the Brazilian Football Confederation.

=== Philadelphia Union ===
On 2 August 2013, Gilberto was signed by Philadelphia Union in Major League Soccer.

=== Sacramento Republic FC ===
On 12 March 2014, USL Pro side Sacramento Republic FC announced that they had signed Gilberto for the 2014 season.
