= Chris Konopka =

American professional soccer player (born 1985)

- Konopka lifts the 2016 Scottish League Cup at Hampden Park as a member of Ross County

Personal information
- Full name: Christopher Konopka
- Date of birth: April 14, 1985 (age 41)
- Place of birth: Toms River, New Jersey, U.S.
- Height: 6 ft 5 in (1.96 m)
- Position: Goalkeeper

Youth career
- 1994–2003: Jersey Shore Boca

College career
Years	Team	Apps	(Gls)
2003–2006	Providence Friars	49	(0)

Senior career*
Years	Team	Apps	(Gls)
2004	Jersey Falcons	8	(0)
2007	Kansas City Wizards	0	(0)
2008	Bohemian FC	0	(0)
2009	Sporting Fingal	3	(0)
2010	Waterford United	12	(0)
2011	MLS Pool	–	(–)
2011	→ Columbus Crew (loan)	0	(0)
2011	→ New York Red Bulls (loan)	1	(0)
2012–2013	Philadelphia Union	1	(0)
2013–2015	Toronto FC	21	(0)
2015	→ Toronto FC II	1	(0)
2016	Ross County	0	(0)
2016	Portland Timbers	0	(0)
2017	FC Edmonton	9	(0)
2018	Cardiff City	0	(0)
2018	Minnesota United	0	(0)
2019	Tampa Bay Rowdies	0	(0)
Total		56	(0)

Managerial career
- 2012–2013: Penn Quakers (assistant)
- 2020–2022: UCF Knights (assistant)
- 2020–: Orlando City (Academy Goalkeeper Director)
- 2022–: United States U15 (assistant)
- * Club domestic league appearances and goals as of February 27, 2019

Christopher Konopka (born April 14, 1985) is an American former professional soccer player who played as a goalkeeper.

Konopka is the first American-born soccer player to ever win the Irish Double and also the first to win back-to-back FAI Cup medals.

== Early life ==
Konopka came through the youth system of the Jersey Shore Boca soccer club in South Jersey.

== College career ==
He played NCAA Division I collegiate soccer in the Big East Conference at Providence College from 2003 to 2006. Konopka earned himself trials in England after his senior season with Charlton Athletic, Cardiff City, and Walsall FC. However, he was unable to sign in the United Kingdom as his attempted acquisition of a Polish passport through ancestry had not yet been completed.

== Club career ==
=== Early career ===
In the summer of 2003 he played for Jersey Falcons in the Premier Development League team. In the summer of 2004 he made 8 appearances for the Jersey Falcons in the same league.

Konopka was drafted in the third round, 29th overall, by the Kansas City Wizards in 2007 MLS Supplemental Draft. He became the first player in the history of Providence College to be drafted by an MLS team. Konopka was released by the Wizards at the end of the 2007 season without making an appearance.

=== Ireland ===
In March 2008 Konopka signed a one-year contract with Bohemian FC following a successful trial. He made his debut on July 1, 2008, against Derry City in the League Cup. As a member of Bohs, Konopka won the League of Ireland championship and the FAI Cup in 2008. He also impressed with the Bohemians' A-Side in the inaugural A Championship, leading Bohemians to the Grand Final.

On July 28, 2009, Konopka signed a short-term contract with then League of Ireland First Division side Sporting Fingal. He made his debut on October 2, 2009, in a 2–2 draw against Monaghan United. Konopka went on to make 3 more appearances for Fingal including a 4–2 win over Bray Wanderers in the 2009 FAI Cup semi-final on October 25. Konopka helped the club win the 2009 FAI Cup and promotion to the League of Ireland Premier Division for 2010.

Konopka signed with Waterford United on December 18, 2009, for the 2010 season. He made his debut on March 5, 2010, in a 3–0 victory over Wexford Youths. Konopka received "man of the match" honors from extratime.ie for his performance in a 1–0 victory over Shelbourne on May 7, 2010. It was Waterford's first win over Shelbourne at Tolka Park in 11 years.

=== Major League Soccer ===
Konopka was signed by the Columbus Crew of Major League Soccer from the MLS Goalkeeper Pool on July 26, 2011. Despite featuring in an international friendly that evening against Newcastle United and being re-called for 4 future matches he would not make a professional appearance for the club.

Konopka was signed by New York Red Bulls from the MLS Goalkeeper Pool on August 13, 2011. He made his league debut that evening in a 2–2 draw against the Chicago Fire. His emergency loan ended after the match and he returned to the MLS Goalkeeper Pool for the end of the 2011 MLS Season.

On March 2, 2012, Konopka signed with the Philadelphia Union. He made his debut on May 26, 2012, in a 1–0 loss against Toronto FC. Three days later he featured in Philadelphia's first US Open Cup victory against the Rochester Rhinos.

On September 13, 2013, the Philadelphia Union traded Konopka to Toronto FC . Konopka made his debut on May 2, 2015, in a 1–0 victory against his former club the Philadelphia Union. He was named to the MLS Team of the Week on May 18, 2015, for his seven save effort in a 1–1 draw against the New England Revolution. Konopka finished 2015 with a break-out season for TFC setting the all-time single season Toronto goalkeeper league win record with 11 and his 59.5 win percentage is the best ever in Toronto goalkeeping history. Konopka played for Toronto FC in Major League Soccer from 2013 to 2015 bringing the team to their first ever playoff appearance in club history in 2015. During 2015 he set TFC records for most regular single-season game wins (11) and highest regular single-season win percentage (59.5%) by any Toronto FC goalkeeper in the club's tenure. At the end of the 2015 MLS Season, Konopka finished 5th in voting for the MLS Goalkeeper of the Year Award and was nominated for MLS Comeback Player of the Year.

=== Scotland ===
On March 8, 2016, Konopka joined Ross County in the Scottish Premiership until the end of the 2015–16 season. On March 13, 2016, Konopka was a substitute for Ross County who won the 2015–16 Scottish League Cup 2–1 against Hibernian.

=== Return to North America ===
Konopka returned to Major League Soccer and signed for the Timbers on July 28, 2016.

On February 15, 2017, Konopka signed with North American Soccer League side FC Edmonton.

=== Wales ===
On March 8, 2018, Konopka signed a short-term deal with EFL Championship side Cardiff City until the end of the 2017–18 season as cover for Neil Etheridge and Brian Murphy.

=== Third stint in North America ===
Konopka joined Minnesota United on a short-term deal as emergency goalkeeper cover. He appeared as an unused substitute in Minnesota's match against Columbus Crew on October 28, 2018.

Konopka was signed by the USL Championship's Tampa Bay Rowdies on February 27, 2019.

== International career ==
In December 2007, Konopka was named to the United States U-23 National Team player pool by head coach Piotr Nowak.

== Post-playing career ==
In June 2023, Konopka played in the inaugural The Soccer Tournament for Conrad & Beasley United, where they advanced to the quarter-finals.

== Personal life ==
Konopka grew up in Toms River, New Jersey and played both basketball and soccer at Toms River High School East. He holds both American and Polish citizenship. He is married to Maria Papadakis.

== Career statistics ==
As of matches played March 8, 2018

Appearances and goals by club, season and competition
Club	Season	League			Cup (Note: Includes FAI Cup, Lamar Hunt U.S. Open Cup and Canadian Championship matches.)		League Cup (Note: Includes League of Ireland Cup and MLS Playoffs matches.)		Continental		Total	
Club	Season	Division	Apps	Goals	Apps	Goals	Apps	Goals	Apps	Goals	Apps	Goals
Kansas City Wizards	2007	MLS	0	0	0	0	0	0	0	0	0	0
Bohemians	2008	League of Ireland Premier Division	0	0	0	0	1	0	0	0	1	0
Sporting Fingal	2009	League of Ireland First Division	3	0	1	0	0	0	0	0	4	0
Waterford United	2010	League of Ireland First Division	12	0	1	0	2	0	0	0	15	0
Columbus Crew	2011	MLS	0	0	0	0	0	0	0	0	0	0
New York Red Bulls	2011	MLS	1	0	0	0	0	0	0	0	1	0
Philadelphia Union	2012	MLS	1	0	1	0	0	0	0	0	2	0
Philadelphia Union	2013	MLS	0	0	0	0	0	0	0	0	0	0
Philadelphia Union	Total		1	0	1	0	0	0	0	0	2	0
Toronto	2013	MLS	0	0	0	0	0	0	0	0	0	0
Toronto	2014	MLS	0	0	0	0	0	0	0	0	0	0
Toronto	2015	MLS	21	0	2	0	1	0	0	0	24	0
Toronto FC II (loan)	2015	USL	1	0	0	0	0	0	0	0	1	0
Toronto	Total		22	0	2	0	1	0	0	0	25	0
Ross County	2015–2016	Scottish Premiership	0	0	0	0	0	0	0	0	0	0
Portland Timbers	2016	MLS	0	0	0	0	0	0	0	0	0	0
FC Edmonton	2017	NASL	9	0	0	0	0	0	0	0	9	0
Cardiff City F.C.	2017–2018	EFL Championship	0	0	0	0	0	0	0	0	0	0
Career total			48	0	5	0	4	0	0	0	57	0

== Honors ==
=== Player honors ===
Bohemians

- League of Ireland Champions: 2008
- FAI Cup Winners: 2008

Sporting Fingal

- FAI Cup Winners: 2009
- League of Ireland Promotion Champions: 2009

Waterford United

- Munster Senior Cup Winners: 2010

Ross County

- Scottish League Cup: 2015–16

Cardiff City FC

- English Premier League Promotion Winners: 2018

== Coaching honors ==
Orlando City

- U17 National Championship: 2021
- Generation Adidas Cup U18 Championship: 2025

United States U15

- Concacaf U15 Champions: 2023
- UEFA U15 Development Tournament Champions (Portugal): 2023
- Vlatko Marković International Tournament Champions (Croatia): 2024

UCF Knights

- AAC League Champions: 2022
- AAC Tournament Champions: 2022

Penn Quakers

- Ivy League Champions: 2013
