= Lionard Pajoy =

Colombian striker (born 1981)

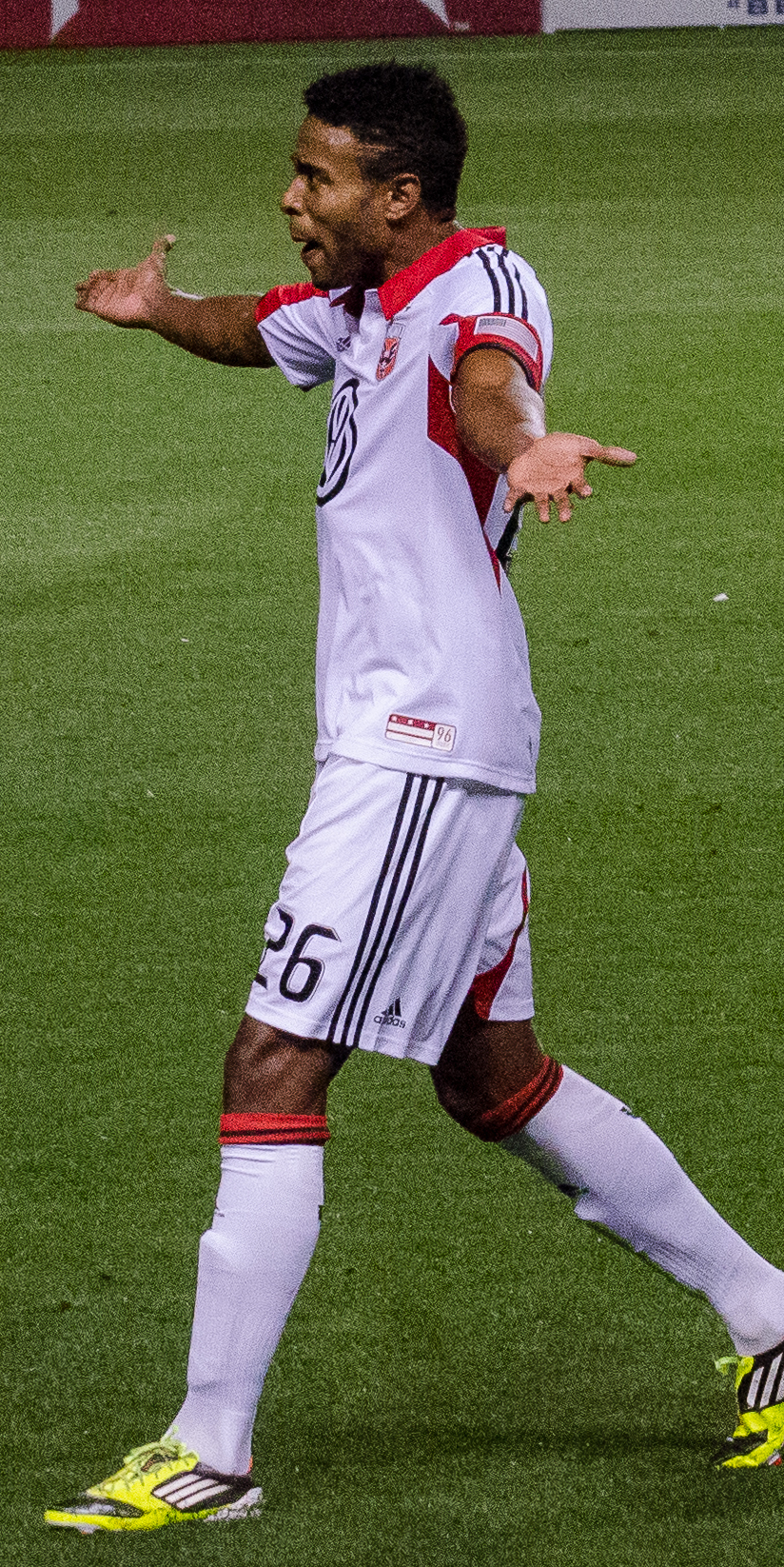
- Pajoy in 2012

Personal information
- Full name: Lionard Fernando Pajoy Ortiz
- Date of birth: June 7, 1981 (age 45)
- Place of birth: Villa del Rosario, Colombia
- Height: 1.85 m (6 ft 1 in)
- Position: Striker

Team information
- Current team: Alianza Universidad
- Number: 11

Senior career*
Years	Team	Apps	(Gls)
2004	Cortuluá	26	(2)
2005	Atlético Huila	27	(2)
2006	Boyacá Chicó	35	(12)
2007–2009	Cúcuta Deportivo	74	(17)
2010	Deportivo Cali	7	(0)
2010	Millonarios	15	(1)
2011	Itagüí Ditaires	32	(13)
2012	Philadelphia Union	20	(5)
2012–2013	D.C. United	33	(5)
2014	La Equidad	20	(1)
2015	Unión Comercio	31	(18)
2016–2017	Alianza Lima	76	(23)
2019–	Alianza Universidad	64	(22)
- * Club domestic league appearances and goals as of 1 January 2024

Lionard Fernando Pajoy Ortiz (born June 7, 1981) is a Colombian professional footballer who plays as a striker for Alianza Universidad.

== Career ==
=== Early career in Colombia ===
Pajoy began his career with Cortulua debuting with the first team during the 2004 season. In 2005, he joined Atlético Huila and remained at the club for one year. The following season, he joined Boyacá Chicó and had his finest season scoring 12 goals in 35 matches.

As a result of his play with Boyacá Chicó, Pajoy was signed by the 2006 Colombian 1st division Champion Cúcuta Deportivo and helped Cúcuta to the semi-finals of the Copa Libertadores 2007. He scored his club's 2nd goal in the away match against Nacional de Montevideo which ended in a 2–2 draw and sealed Cúcuta's semifinal spot. After three years with Cúcuta he joined Deportivo Cali during January 2010. However, he was released from the club at the end of may due to poor play. He joined Millonarios for the remainder of the 2010 season but only scored 1 goal in 15 matches.

In early 2011 he was sent on loan to newly promoted Itagüí Ditaires. While with Itagüí he recovered the form that made him a respected scorer in Colombia. On October 1, 2011, Pajoy scored Itagüí's three goals in a 3–1 victory over Real Cartagena. In his one year at the club Pajoy helped lead the club to a 9th place overall finish and a second-place finish in Torneo Finalización, in which he was one of the top scorers with 10 goals in 17 matches.

=== Major League Soccer ===
Pajoy signed with Philadelphia Union of Major League Soccer on February 8, 2012. On August 16, 2012, Pajoy was traded with an international roster spot to D.C. United in exchange for Danny Cruz. He scored his first goal for United in a 4–2 win against Chicago one week later. On September 20, Pajoy's half-volley proved the difference in a 1–0 win at his old club.

=== Return to Colombia ===
At the end of the 2013 season, Pajoy left DC after they declined the option on his contract. He would return to Colombian football for the 2014 season, signing with top flight side La Equidad on a one-year contract. Unable to find consistent playing time with the Bogotá-based club, he finished the season with just one goal from 20 league appearances.

=== Peru ===
Following the expiry of his contract with La Equidad, Pajoy moved to Peru to sign for Unión Comercio. Rediscovering his goalscoring form, Pajoy would finish the first phase of the 2015 season – the Torneo del Inca – with 7 goals from just 8 games, including 4 on his debut in a 4–2 win over Sport Loreto. However, he was unable to prevent the Nueva Cajamarca club from getting knocked out at the group stage. Continuing this form into the 2015 Apertura campaign, the Colombian scored another 8 goals to propel him to the top of the league goalscoring charts. Pajoy would remain among the league's top goalscorers for the rest of the 2015 Torneo Descentralizado, with 10 goals in 15 Clausura appearances. A hat-trick (in a 5–2 win) against bottom club Sport Loreto in the final round of fixtures would confirm his position as the league's top goalscorer with 25 goals in 39 games (scoring at a rate of once every 137 minutes), though his team would fail to qualify for the Playoff Phase.

Following his form in the 2015 season, Pajoy opted not to re-sign with Unión Comercio and instead signed a one-year deal with Alianza Lima, historically one of the most successful and popular clubs in Peru, with the ambition of helping them secure their first Peruvian championship since 2006. Just as he had with his previous club, Pajoy scored on his Alianza debut, netting a 21st-minute winner in a 2–1 win over Alianza Atlético. He remained in the headlines in the next round, being sent off in the club's 2–1 win over Deportivo Municipal. Having been suspended for round 3, he returned to action the next week against Sporting Cristal where he scored both his side's goals in a 4–2 loss.

== Career statistics ==
As of December 31, 2017

Appearances and goals by club, season and competition
Club	Season	League			National cup (Note: Includes Open Cup.)		Continental		Other		Total	
Club	Season	Division	Apps	Goals	Apps	Goals	Apps	Goals	Apps	Goals	Apps	Goals
Cortuluá	2004	Categoría Primera A	26	2	0	0	0	0	–		26	2
Atlético Huila	2005	Categoría Primera A	27	2	0	0	0	0	–		27	2
Boyacá Chicó	2006	Categoría Primera A	35	12	0	0	0	0	–		35	12
Cúcuta Deportivo	2007	Categoría Primera A	31	13	0	0	1	0	–		32	13
Cúcuta Deportivo	2008	Categoría Primera A	15	1	0	0	0	0	–		15	1
Cúcuta Deportivo	2009	Categoría Primera A	28	3	0	0	0	0	–		28	3
Cúcuta Deportivo	Total		74	17	0	0	1	0	0	0	75	17
Deportivo Cali	2010	Categoría Primera A	7	0	0	0	0	0	–		7	0
Millonarios	2010	Categoría Primera A	15	1	0	0	0	0	–		15	1
Itagüí Ditaires	2011	Categoría Primera A	32	13	1	0	0	0	–		33	13
Philadelphia Union	2012	Major League Soccer	20	5	4	2	0	0	–		24	7
D.C. United	2012	Major League Soccer	12	3	0	0	0	0	4 (Note: Appearances in MLS Cup Playoffs)	0	16	3
D.C. United	2013	Major League Soccer	20	2	3	1	0	0	–		23	3
D.C. United	Total		32	5	3	1	0	0	4	0	39	6
La Equidad	2014	Categoría Primera A	20	1			–		–		20	1
Unión Comercio	2015	Peruvian Primera División	31	18	8	7	2	0	–		41	25
Alianza Lima	2016	Peruvian Primera División	41	17	0	0	0	0	–		41	17
Alianza Lima	2017	Peruvian Primera División	35	6	0	0	1	0	–		36	6
Alianza Lima	Total		76	23	0	0	1	0	0	0	77	23
Career total			395	99	14	9	4	0	4	0	417	108

== Honors ==
Alianza Lima

- Peruvian Primera División: 2017

D.C. United

- Lamar Hunt U.S. Open Cup: 2013

Cúcuta

- Copa Libertadores semi-finalist: 2007
