= 2010 Philadelphia Union season =

Philadelphia Union
2010 season
- Owner: Keystone Sports & Entertainment, LLC
- Head coach: Peter Nowak
- Stadium: Lincoln Financial Field (Capacity: 69,796); PPL Park (Capacity:18,500)
- MLS: Eastern Conference: 7th Overall table: 14th
- MLS Cup Playoffs: Did not qualify
- U.S. Open Cup: Did not qualify
- Top goalscorer: Sebastien Le Toux (14)
- Highest home attendance: 34,870 (at Lincoln Financial Field vs. DCU); 18,779 (at PPL Park vs. LAG)
- Average home league attendance: 19,254
- Biggest win: PHI 3–0 CHV (Sep 25)
- Biggest defeat: COL 4–1 PHI (Sep 29)
Home colors	Away colors

The 2010 Philadelphia Union season was the first season of the team's existence, competing in Major League Soccer, the top flight of American soccer. The Union were the sixteenth franchise to join the league in 2010 and were managed under former MLS player Peter Nowak.

== Review ==
=== Preseason ===
Philadelphia Union defeated the University of North Carolina Tar Heels, 0–5, in their first ever pre-season match on February 13, 2010, in Greensboro, North Carolina.

On February 28, during a preseason tour of Mexico, The Union played to a 2–2 draw against the Chivas de Guadalajara reserves. Two days later, The Union defeated Mexican second-division side Universidad de Guadalajara 0–1.

On March 14, the Union played their first friendly against an MLS opponent, losing 2–0 to FC Dallas in a match played in Tampa, Florida. Five days later, in their final pre-season friendly, The Union played the Tampa Bay Rowdies (a fellow first-year expansion club, albeit in the second-division NASL) and lost 1–0.

=== March ===
Philadelphia began their first Major League Soccer regular season on the road with a nationally televised match against Seattle Sounders FC on March 25, 2010. Union central defender Danny Califf received the first booking in Union history, by receiving a Yellow Card 33 seconds into the match.

Rookie Toni Ståhl (playing out of position at the other center back) was the first Union player to be sent off, after being booked in the 22nd and 37th minutes.

Two first-half goals from Brad Evans and Fredy Montero were too much for the ten-man Union, as they went down to defeat 2–0 in their first match, in front of a crowd of over 36,000 rabid Seattle fans—and about 100 hearty Sons of Ben who made the trip.

After the game, the Union released Costa Rican defender David Myrie, and sent Ståhl out on loan to their USL-2 affiliate, Harrisburg.

=== April ===
Philadelphia's first home match was on April 10, against D.C. United. The Union scored a 3–2 victory with a hat-trick by Sebastian Le Toux in front of a crowd of just under 35,000 at their temporary home, Lincoln Financial Field. The Union was bolstered by the signing of defender Cristian Arrieta from the Puerto Rico Islanders earlier in the week.

On April 15, the Union began a four-game league road trip with a visit to Toronto FC. This was TFC's home opener and the first match played on BMO Field's new natural grass surface. The Union dropped the match 2–1 thanks to a first-half red card from captain Danny Califf and a late penalty. The Union showed heart being a man down for the majority of the match after pulling back a goal through Jordan Harvey.

The Union then played rival New York Red Bulls twice in four days at Red Bull Arena. First, on the 24th in a league match, the Union dropped a second straight 2–1 decision. After pulling into a tie thanks to Sebastien Le Toux, the Union again were made to suffer loss from a defensive blunder which led to a game-winning penalty. Later in the week, the Union again faced the New York Red Bulls, but this time in a U.S. Open Cup qualifier. The winner of that cup tie would host New England Revolution in the next round of qualifying, May 12. The Union was again on the losing side of a 2–1 scoreline with Sebastian Le Toux scoring a late goal to make things interesting after the Union had trailed 2–0 at the half. The Union were given their first major injury scare when leading scorer Sebastian Le Toux was carried off the field with what appeared to be a major knee injury. The Union were eliminated from the U.S. Open Cup.

=== May ===
The Union continued their long road trip on May 1 against the league-leading and undefeated Los Angeles Galaxy. The Union were outclassed, giving up a goal in the first minute and ultimately trailed the match 3–0 at the half. Midfielder Stefani Miglioranzi was red-carded in the 44th minute. The Union played the entire second-half a man-down and held the Galaxy scoreless. The Union notched a goal through Jack McInerney, his first professional goal, making the final score 3–1.

The Union concluded their first major roadtrip on May 8 against defending MLS Cup Champion Real Salt Lake. The Union would lose the game 3–0, a scoreline which did not accurately reflect the competitiveness of a game played mostly in the midfield.

On May 15, the Union returned home to Philadelphia to play FC Dallas before a crowd of just over 25,000 at Lincoln Financial Field. The Union went behind early, but showed great attacking flair and were kept scoreless only thanks to the heroics of FC Dallas goalkeeper Kevin Hartman. Late in stoppage time in the second half, the Union's number-one draft pick Danny Mwanga struck a beautiful volley into the lower left corner of the net to give the Union an important tie. Sebastian Le Toux returned to play for the first time since late April after recovering from a knee injury.

== 2010 roster ==

The Starting XI in the season finale against the Columbus Crew on October 24, 2010.

As of August 31, 2010.

Note: Flags indicate national team as defined under FIFA eligibility rules; some limited exceptions apply. Players may hold more than one non-FIFA nationality.

No.	Pos.	Nation	Player
1	GK	USA	Chris Seitz
2	DF	USA	Jordan Harvey
3	DF	COL	Juan Diego González
4	DF	USA	Danny Califf (captain)
6	MF	BRA	Stefani Miglioranzi
7	MF	BRA	Fred
8	MF	USA	Andrew Jacobson
9	FW	FRA	Sébastien Le Toux
10	FW	COD	Danny Mwanga
11	MF	USA	Shea Salinas
12	DF	FIN	Toni Ståhl
13	MF	USA	Kyle Nakazawa

No.	Pos.	Nation	Player
14	MF	USA	Amobi Okugo
15	FW	VEN	Alejandro Moreno (vice-captain)
16	DF	USA	Michael Orozco Fiscal (on loan from San Luis)
17	MF	USA	J.T. Noone
18	GK	USA	Brad Knighton
19	FW	USA	Jack McInerney
20	MF	COL	Roger Torres (on loan from América de Cali)
21	MF	ARG	Eduardo Coudet
22	MF	USA	Justin Mapp
23	MF	USA	Nick Zimmerman
25	DF	USA	Sheanon Williams
26	DF	PUR	Cristian Arrieta

== Competitions ==
Win Loss Tie

=== Preseason ===
February 12, 2010	North Carolina Tar Heels	0–5	Philadelphia Union	Greensboro, North Carolina
			Le Toux 20', 29' (pen.), 44'; Salinas 54'; McInerney 89'	Stadium: Macpherson Stadium

February 28, 2010	Guadalajara	2–2	Philadelphia Union	Guadalajara, Mexico
	Arellano 16'; Fabián 70'		McInerney 49'; Zimmerman 53'

March 2, 2010	Universidad de Guadalajara	0–1	Philadelphia Union	Guadalajara, Mexico
			Fred 65'

March 14, 2010	Philadelphia Union	0–2	FC Dallas	Tampa, Florida
	Moreno (red card); Califf (red card); Orozco Fiscal (red card)		McCarty 10'; Luna 76'	Stadium: Pepin Stadium

March 19, 2010	FC Tampa Bay	1–0	Philadelphia Union	Tampa, Florida
7:30ET	Wheeler 5'			Stadium: Pepin Stadium

=== Friendlies ===
June 23, 2010	Reading United A.C.	0–2	Philadelphia Union	Reading, Pennsylvania
7:30 ET		Report	Schoenle (o.g.) 34'; Zimmerman 59'	Stadium: Don Thomas Stadium

July 14, 2010	Philadelphia Union	1–0	Celtic	Chester, Pennsylvania
8:10 ET	Le Toux 23'; Harvey (yellow card) 40'; Ståhl (yellow card) 65' (yellow-red card) 89'; Miglioranzi (yellow card) 90'	Report		Stadium: PPL Park; Attendance: 18,659 (SO)

July 21, 2010	Philadelphia Union	0–1	Manchester United	Philadelphia, Pennsylvania
7:30 ET		Report	Obertan 76'	Stadium: Lincoln Financial Field; Attendance: 44,213

July 27, 2010	Harrisburg City Islanders	1–1	Philadelphia Union	Harrisburg, Pennsylvania
7:00 ET	Harvey (o.g.) 31'	Report	Mwanga 30'	Stadium: Skyline Sports Complex

September 1, 2010	Philadelphia Union	1–0	C.D. Guadalajara	Chester, Pennsylvania
8:00 ET	McInerney 46'	Report		Stadium: PPL Park; Attendance: 18,510 (SO)

=== MLS regular season ===
==== League tables ====
===== Eastern Conference =====
Pos	Team	Pld	W	L	T	GF	GA	GD	Pts
4	Chicago Fire	30	9	12	9	37	38	−1	36
5	Toronto FC	30	9	13	8	33	41	−8	35
6	New England Revolution	30	9	16	5	32	50	−18	32
7	Philadelphia Union	30	8	15	7	35	49	−14	31
8	D.C. United	30	6	20	4	21	47	−26	22

Source: MLS

===== Overall =====
Pos	Team	Pld	W	L	T	GF	GA	GD	Pts	
1	LA Galaxy (S)	30	18	7	5	44	26	+18	59	Qualification for the CONCACAF Champions League
2	Real Salt Lake	30	15	4	11	45	20	+25	56	
3	New York Red Bulls	30	15	9	6	38	29	+9	51	
4	FC Dallas	30	12	4	14	42	28	+14	50	Qualification for the CONCACAF Champions League
5	Columbus Crew	30	14	8	8	40	34	+6	50	
6	Seattle Sounders FC (U)	30	14	10	6	39	35	+4	48	Qualification for the CONCACAF Champions League
7	Colorado Rapids (C)	30	12	8	10	44	32	+12	46	Qualification for the CONCACAF Champions League
8	San Jose Earthquakes	30	13	10	7	34	33	+1	46	
9	Kansas City Wizards	30	11	13	6	36	35	+1	39	
10	Chicago Fire	30	9	12	9	37	38	−1	36	
11	Toronto FC (V)	30	9	13	8	33	41	−8	35	Qualification for the CONCACAF Champions League
12	Houston Dynamo	30	9	15	6	40	49	−9	33	
13	New England Revolution	30	9	16	5	32	50	−18	32	
14	Philadelphia Union	30	8	15	7	35	49	−14	31	
15	Chivas USA	30	8	18	4	31	45	−14	28	
16	D.C. United	30	6	20	4	21	47	−26	22	

Source: MLS
Rules for classification: 1) points; 2) head-to-head record; 3) goal difference; 4) number of goals scored
(C) MLS Cup champions; (S) Supporters' Shield winners; (U) U.S. Open Cup winners; (V) Canadian Championship winners

==== Results ====
Overall								Home						Away					
Pld	Pts	W	L	T	GF	GA	GD	W	L	T	GF	GA	GD	W	L	T	GF	GA	GD
30	31	8	15	7	35	49	−14	6	3	6	22	16	+6	2	12	1	13	33	−20

Last updated: October 24, 2010
Pld = Matches played; Pts = Points; W = Matches won; T = Matches tied; L = Matches lost; GF = Goals for; GA = Goals against; GD = Goal difference

Round	1	2	3	4	5	6	7	8	9	10	11	12	13	14	15	16	17	18	19	20	21	22	23	24	25	26	27	28	29	30
Stadium	A	H	A	A	A	A	H	A	A	A	H	A	H	H	H	H	A	H	H	A	A	H	H	A	H	A	H	H	H	A
Result	L	W	L	L	L	L	T	W	L	L	W	T	L	W	T	L	L	T	T	L	W	T	W	L	W	L	W	L	W	L
Position	13	10	12	13	15	15	15	15	15	15	15	14	14	12	12	14	15	15	15	15	15	15	13	13	12	12	13	13	13	14

Updated to match(es) played on October 24, 2010. Source: MLS Results and League table
A = Away; H = Home; W = Win; L = Loss; T = Tie

March 25, 2010	Seattle Sounders FC	2–0	Philadelphia Union	Seattle, Washington
6:55 PDT	Evans 12'; Montero 43'	Report	Califf (yellow card) 0'; Ståhl (yellow card) 22' (yellow-red card) 39'; Myrie (yellow card) 63'; Moreno (yellow card) 86'	Stadium: Qwest Field; Attendance: 36,300; Referee: Ricardo Salazar

April 10, 2010	Philadelphia Union	3–2	D.C. United	Philadelphia, Pennsylvania
6:00 ET	Le Toux 4', 40', 80'; Arrieta (yellow card) 55'	Report	Wallace (yellow card) 35'; Barklage (yellow card) 42'; Quaranta 63'; Moreno 70'; Quaranta (yellow card) 73'; Jakovic (red card) 79'; Cristman (yellow card) 89'	Stadium: Lincoln Financial Field; Attendance: 34,870; Referee: Terry Vaughn

April 15, 2010	Toronto FC	2–1	Philadelphia Union	Toronto, Ontario, Canada
7:00 ET	Hscanovics (yellow card) 16'; Usanov (yellow card) 25'; De Rosario 35', 81' (pen.)	Report	Califf (red card) 34'; Harvey 45+'	Stadium: BMO Field; Attendance: 21,978; Referee: Baldomero Toledo

April 24, 2010	New York Red Bulls	2–1	Philadelphia Union	Harrison, New Jersey
4:00 ET	Ibrahim 50'; Ángel 67' (pen.); Petke (yellow card) 70'	Report	Le Toux 59'	Stadium: Red Bull Arena; Attendance: 15,619; Referee: Kevin Stott

May 1, 2010	Los Angeles Galaxy	3–1	Philadelphia Union	Carson, California
7:30 PT	DeLaGarza 1'; Buddle 27', 44'; Gonzalez (yellow card) 77'	Report	Miglioranzi (red card) 45+'; Nakazawa (yellow card) 73'; McInerney 84'	Stadium: The Home Depot Center; Attendance: 15,453; Referee: Yader Reyes

May 8, 2010	Real Salt Lake	3–0	Philadelphia Union	Sandy, Utah
2:00 MT	Williams (yellow card) 17'; Beckerman 27'; Beckerman (yellow card) 41'; Olave 51'; Saborio 70'; Borchers (yellow card) 81'	Report	Arrieta (yellow card) 50'	Stadium: Rio Tinto Stadium; Attendance: 14,224; Referee: Hilario Grajeda

May 15, 2010	Philadelphia Union	1–1	FC Dallas	Philadelphia, Pennsylvania
4:00 ET	Torres (yellow card) 61'; Mwanga 90+'	Report	Shea 13'; Pearce (yellow card) 82'	Stadium: Lincoln Financial Field; Attendance: 25,038; Referee: Ricardo Salazar

May 29, 2010	Houston Dynamo	2–3	Philadelphia Union	Houston, Texas
7:30 CT	Ching 51'; Robinson 58'; Mullen (yellow card) 79'	Report	Harvey (yellow card) 21'; Salinas 39'; Nakazawa (yellow card) 41'; Arrieta (yellow card) 50'; Miglioranzi (yellow card) 57'; Le Toux 68'; Mwanga 90+'	Stadium: Robertson Stadium; Attendance: 13,555; Referee: Steven Depiero

June 5, 2010	Chicago Fire S.C.	2–1	Philadelphia Union	Bridgeview, Illinois
7:30 CT	Husidic 14'; Brown (yellow card) 45'; McBride (yellow card) 70'; Pappa 74'	Report	Miglioranzi (yellow card) 22'; Mwanga 90+'	Stadium: Toyota Park; Attendance: 14,658; Referee: Abiodun Okulaja

June 10, 2010	Kansas City Wizards	2–0	Philadelphia Union	Kansas City, Kansas
8:00 CT	Kamara 9'; Jewsbury (yellow card) 28'; Zusi 35'; Wolff (yellow card) 52'; Harrington (yellow card) 78'	Report	Orozco Fiscal (yellow card) 26' (yellow-red card) 42'; Arrieta (yellow card) 74'	Stadium: CommunityAmerica Ballpark; Attendance: 10,176; Referee: Alex Prus

June 27, 2010	Philadelphia Union	3–1	Seattle Sounders FC	Chester, Pennsylvania
5:00 ET	Le Toux 54' (pen.); Fred 79'; Mwanga 84'	Report	Ianni (yellow card) 20'; Noonan 44'	Stadium: PPL Park; Attendance: 18,755 (SO); Referee: Baldomero Toledo

July 3, 2010	Chivas USA	1–1	Philadelphia Union	Carson, California
7:30 PT	Trujillo (yellow card) 27'; Braun (yellow card) 31'; Gavin 42'; Jazic (yellow card) 82'	Report	Mwanga 21'; Torres (yellow card) 38'; Orozco Fiscal (yellow card) 57'	Stadium: The Home Depot Center; Attendance: 14,479; Referee: Edvin Jurisevic

July 10, 2010	Philadelphia Union	1–2	San Jose Earthquakes	Chester, Pennsylvania
6:00 ET	Fred 14' (yellow card) 51'	Report	Glen 45'; Wondolowski (yellow card) 69'; Alvarez 90'; Corrales (yellow card) 93+'	Stadium: PPL Park; Attendance: 17,158; Referee: Abiodun Okulaja

July 17, 2010	Philadelphia Union	2–1	Toronto FC	Chester, Pennsylvania
3:30 ET	Califf (yellow card) 38'; Arrieta (yellow card) 48'; Orozco Fiscal 61'; Le Toux 90+' (pen.)	Report	Gargan (yellow card) 28'; Barrett 81'	Stadium: PPL Park; Attendance: 17,251; Referee: Ramon Hernandez

July 31, 2010	Philadelphia Union	1–1	New England Revolution	Chester, Pennsylvania
3:30 ET	Le Toux 25'; Fred (yellow card) 60'	Report	Joseph (yellow card) 45'; Perovic 70'; Perovic (yellow card) 85'	Stadium: PPL Park; Attendance: 18,147; Referee: Jasen Anno

August 5, 2010	Philadelphia Union	1–2	Columbus Crew	Chester, Pennsylvania
8:00 ET	Fred (yellow card) 42'; Le Toux 45+' (pen.)	Report	Carroll (yellow card) 37'; Lenhart 43', 50'	Stadium: PPL Park; Attendance: 18,001; Referee: Ricardo Salazar

August 8, 2010	FC Dallas	3–1	Philadelphia Union	Frisco, Texas
5:00 CT	Ferreira 24' (pen.); Cunningham 75', 81'	Report	Moreno 9'; Knighton (red card) 22'; Orozco Fiscal (yellow card) 55'; Jacobson (yellow card) 66'	Stadium: Pizza Hut Park; Attendance: 8,732; Referee: Jair Marrufo

August 11, 2010	Philadelphia Union	1–1	Real Salt Lake	Chester, Pennsylvania
7:30 ET	Fred (yellow card) 2'; Mwanga 8'; Torres (yellow card) 90+'	Report	Espindola 17'; González (yellow card) 37'; Alexandre (yellow card) 50'; McKenzie (yellow card) 60'; Borchers (yellow card) 79'	Stadium: PPL Park; Attendance: 16,128; Referee: David Gantar

August 14, 2010	Philadelphia Union	1–1	Colorado Rapids	Chester, Pennsylvania
4:00 ET	Mwanga 73'	Report	Larentowicz (yellow card) 20'; Larentowicz 59'; Cummings (yellow card) 66'; Pickens (yellow card) 71'; Jamie Smith (yellow card) 85'	Stadium: PPL Park; Attendance: 17,749; Referee: Terry Vaughn

August 22, 2010	D.C. United	2–0	Philadelphia Union	Washington, D.C.
2:00 ET	Allsopp 22', 63'; Zayner (yellow card) 70'; James (yellow card) 90+'	Report		Stadium: RFK Stadium; Attendance: 12,165; Referee: Alex Prus

August 28, 2010	New England Revolution	1–2	Philadelphia Union	Foxborough, Massachusetts
7:30 ET	Osei (yellow card) 19'; Stolica 31'; Gibbs (red card) 40'	Report	Miglioranzi (yellow card) 29'; McInerney 82'; McInerney (yellow card) 83'; Harvey (yellow card) 84'; Mapp 90+2'	Stadium: Gillette Stadium; Attendance: 13,578; Referee: Hilario Grajeda

September 4, 2010	Philadelphia Union	1–1	Kansas City Wizards	Chester, Pennsylvania
3:30 ET	Le Toux 33'; Orozco Fiscal (yellow card) 71'	Report	Espinoza (yellow card) 64'; Arnaud 69'	Stadium: PPL Park; Attendance: 17,182; Referee: Ramon Hernandez

September 11, 2010	Philadelphia Union	1–0	Chicago Fire	Chester, Pennsylvania
6:00 ET	Le Toux 36'; Jacobson (yellow card) 60'	Report	Ljungberg (yellow card) 36'; Conde (yellow card) 45+'	Stadium: PPL Park; Attendance: 18,563 (SO); Referee: Edvin Jurisevic

September 15, 2010	San Jose Earthquakes	1–0	Philadelphia Union	Santa Clara, California
7:00 PT	Wondolowski 69'; Convey (yellow card) 90'; Alvarez (yellow card) 90+'	Report	Jacobson (yellow card) 20'	Stadium: Buck Shaw Stadium; Attendance: 8,109; Referee: Silviu Petrescu

September 25, 2010	Philadelphia Union	3–0	Chivas USA	Chester, Pennsylvania
4:00 ET	Moreno 25'; Mapp (yellow card) 44'; Fred 45+'; Fred (yellow card) 45+'; Le Toux 69'	Report	Trujillo (yellow card) 45+'; Umaña (yellow card) 67'; Nagamura (yellow card) 85'	Stadium: PPL Park; Attendance: 16,481; Referee: Mark Geiger

September 29, 2010	Colorado Rapids	4–1	Philadelphia Union	Commerce City, Colorado
7:30 MT	Cummings 8', 15'; Thompson 68'; Amarikwa 86'	Report	Califf (yellow card) 10'; McInerney 90'	Stadium: Dick's Sporting Goods Park; Attendance: 10,165; Referee: Baldomero Toledo

October 2, 2010	Philadelphia Union	1–1	Houston Dynamo	Chester, Pennsylvania
4:00 ET	Harvey (yellow card) 38'; Le Toux 40'	Report	Hainault 12'; Davis (yellow card) 58'	Stadium: PPL Park; Attendance: 16,115; Referee: Kevin Stott

October 7, 2010	Philadelphia Union	0–1	Los Angeles Galaxy	Chester, Pennsylvania
8:00 ET		Report	Buddle 27'; Stephens (yellow card) 77'; Kirovski (yellow card) 89'	Stadium: PPL Park; Attendance: 18,779 (SO); Referee: Jorge Gonzalez

October 16, 2010	Philadelphia Union	2–1	New York Red Bulls	Chester, Pennsylvania
6:00 ET	Fred 8'; Orozco Fiscal 28'; Fred (yellow card) 67'	Report	Borman (yellow card) 18'; Borman 48'; Ángel (yellow card) 55'	Stadium: PPL Park; Attendance: 18,578 (SO); Referee: Paul Ward

October 24, 2010	Columbus Crew	3–1	Philadelphia Union	Columbus, Ohio
4:00 ET	Schelotto 15' (pen.); Renteria 42'; Renteria (yellow card) 63'; Mendoza 79'	Report	Orozco Fiscal (yellow card) 63'; Torres (yellow card) 76'; Le Toux 87'	Stadium: Columbus Crew Stadium; Attendance: 19,006; Referee: Jair Marrufo

=== U.S. Open Cup ===
April 27, 2010	New York Red Bulls	2–1	Philadelphia Union	Harrison, New Jersey
8:00 ET	Chinn 16', 41'; Borman (yellow card) 66'; Boyens (yellow card) 81'	Report	Jacobson (yellow card) 31'; Le Toux 68'; Miglioranzi (yellow card) 76'	Stadium: Red Bull Arena; Attendance: 3,015; Referee: Andrew Chapin

== Statistics ==
Statistics are from all MLS matches. Ages are as of March 25, 2010 (the date of their season opener).

Nat	No	Player	Age	Pos	Apps	Starts	G	A	Yellow card	Red card	Acquired	Salary
(United States)	2	Jordan Harvey	January 28, 1984 (aged 26)	DF	30	29	1	1	3	0	Expansion Draft	$56,250
(Colombia)	3	Juan Diego González	September 22, 1980 (aged 29)	DF	7	7	0	0	0	0	Signed	N/A
(United States)	4	Danny Califf	March 17, 1980 (aged 30)	DF	28	28	0	1	3	1	Signed	$250,000
(Jamaica)	5	Shavar Thomas*	January 29, 1981 (aged 29)	DF	1	0	0	0	1	0	Expansion Draft	$159,375
(Brazil)	6	Stefani Miglioranzi	September 20, 1977 (aged 32)	MF	26	25	0	0	4	1	Expansion Draft	$148,125
(Brazil)	7	Fred	August 18, 1979 (aged 30)	MF	25	24	4	1	6	0	Trade	$282,000
(United States)	8	Andrew Jacobson	September 24, 1985 (aged 24)	MF	25	13	0	0	3	0	Expansion Draft	$40,000
(France)	9	Sébastien Le Toux	January 10, 1984 (aged 26)	FW	28	28	14	11	0	0	Expansion Draft	$122,000
(Democratic Republic of the Congo)	10	Danny Mwanga	July 17, 1991 (aged 18)	FW	24	17	7	4	0	0	SuperDraft	$206,250 (GA)
(United States)	11	Shea Salinas	June 24, 1986 (aged 23)	MF	17	7	1	0	0	0	Expansion Draft	$40,000
(Finland)	12	Toni Ståhl	May 11, 1985 (aged 24)	MF	1	1	0	0	1	1	SuperDraft	$110,300
(United States)	13	Kyle Nakazawa	March 16, 1988 (aged 22)	FW	14	8	0	0	2	0	SuperDraft	$40,000
(United States)	14	Amobi Okugo	March 13, 1991 (aged 19)	FW	11	4	0	0	0	0	SuperDraft	$158,000 (GA)
(Venezuela)	15	Alejandro Moreno	July 8, 1979 (aged 30)	FW	26	25	2	7	1	0	Expansion Draft	$158,125
(United States)	16	Michael Orozco Fiscal	February 7, 1986 (aged 24)	DF	29	29	2	0	5	1	On Loan	$200,000
(United States)	17	J. T. Noone	July 17, 1988 (aged 21)	MF	0	0	0	0	0	0	Signed	N/A
(United States)	19	Jack McInerney	August 5, 1992 (aged 17)	FW	17	1	3	0	1	0	SuperDraft	$116,416 (GA)
(Colombia)	20	Roger Torres	July 13, 1991 (aged 18)	MF	21	10	0	6	4	0	On Loan	$99,125
(Argentina)	21	Eduardo Coudet	September 12, 1974 (aged 35)	MF	9	9	0	0	0	0	Signed	N/A
(Costa Rica)	21	David Myrie*	June 1, 1988 (aged 21)	DF	1	1	0	0	1	0	Expansion Draft	N/A
(United States)	22	Justin Mapp	October 18, 1984 (aged 25)	MF	15	10	1	4	1	0	Trade	$280,000
(United States)	23	Nick Zimmerman	May 3, 1987 (aged 22)	MF	8	0	0	0	0	0	Expansion Draft	$40,000
(United States)	25	Sheanon Williams	March 17, 1990 (aged 20)	DF	8	8	0	0	0	0	Signed	N/A
(Puerto Rico)	26	Cristian Arrieta	September 8, 1979 (aged 30)	DF	16	15	0	0	5	0	Signed	$64,500
							35	35	41	5		

* = Not currently part of team.

=== Goalkeepers ===
Nat	No	Player	Age	Apps	Starts	Record	GA	GAA	SO	Acquired	Salary
(United States)	1	Chris Seitz	March 12, 1987 (aged 23)	23	22	5-12-6	41	1.80	0	Trade	$135,500
(United States)	18	Brad Knighton	February 6, 1985 (aged 25)	8	8	3-3-1	8	1.00	2	Expansion Draft	$40,000
(United States)	24	Brian Perk*	July 21, 1989 (aged 20)	0	0	0-0-0	0	0	0	SuperDraft	$86,350
(United States)	?	Danny Cepero*	April 22, 1985 (aged 24)	0	0	0-0-0	0	0	0	Emergency Loan	?
				31	30	8-15-7	49	1.63	2		

* = Not currently part of team.

== Honors and awards ==
=== MLS Team of the Week ===
Week	Player	Opponent	Position	Ref
3	(France) Sebastian Le Toux	D.C. United	FW	
16	(France) Sebastian Le Toux	Toronto FC	FW	

Italics indicates MLS Player of the Week

=== MLS Goal of the Week ===
Week	Player	Opponent	Ref
8	(Democratic Republic of the Congo) Danny Mwanga	FC Dallas	
10	(United States) Shea Salinas	Houston Dynamo	
18	(France) Sebastian Le Toux	New England Revolution	

=== MLS Save of the Week ===
Week	Player	Opponent	Ref
11	(United States) Chris Seitz	FC Dallas	
28	(United States) Brad Knighton	Los Angeles Galaxy	
29	(Brazil) Fred	New York Red Bulls	

== Transfers ==
=== In ===
Note: Flags indicate national team as defined under FIFA eligibility rules; some limited exceptions apply. Players may hold more than one non-FIFA nationality.

No.	Pos.	Nation	Player
26	DF	PUR	Cristian Arrieta (Free agent from Puerto Rico Islanders)
21	MF	ARG	Eduardo Coudet (Free agent from Club Atlético Colón)
22	MF	USA	Justin Mapp (Traded from Chicago Fire)
17	MF	USA	J. T. Noone (Free agent from Harrisburg City Islanders)
3	DF	COL	Juan Diego González (Free agent from Deportivo Pereira)
25	DF	USA	Sheanon Williams (Free agent from Harrisburg City Islanders)
?	GK	USA	Danny Cepero (Emergency loan from Harrisburg City Islanders)

=== Out ===
Note: Flags indicate national team as defined under FIFA eligibility rules; some limited exceptions apply. Players may hold more than one non-FIFA nationality.

No.	Pos.	Nation	Player
21	DF	CRC	David Myrie (Released on waivers)
5	DF	JAM	Shavar Thomas (Traded to Kansas City Wizards)
24	GK	USA	Brian Perk (Released on waivers)
