= 2022 Philadelphia Union season =

Philadelphia Union
2022 season
- Owner: Keystone Sports & Entertainment
- Head coach: Jim Curtin
- Stadium: Subaru Park (Capacity: 18,500)
- MLS: 2nd
- MLS Cup Playoffs: Runners-up
- U.S. Open Cup: Round of 32
- Top goalscorer: League: Dániel Gazdag (22); All: Dániel Gazdag (24)
- Highest home attendance: 19,228 (10/9 vs. TOR)
- Lowest home attendance: 14,533 (3/12 vs. SJ)
- Average home league attendance: 18,126
- Biggest win: PHI 7–0 DC (7/8)
- Biggest defeat: CHA 4–0 PHI (8/6)
Home colors	Away colors

The 2022 Philadelphia Union season was the club's thirteenth season in Major League Soccer, the top flight of American soccer. The team is managed by Jim Curtin, his ninth season with the club. The club's regular season began on February 26, 2022, and concluded on October 9. Outside of MLS, the Union also competed in the 2022 U.S. Open Cup, entering in the Round of 32.

The club finished second in the Supporters' Shield standings and first in the Eastern Conference. The Union appeared in their first MLS Cup, where they lost to Shield winners Los Angeles FC in a penalty shootout.

== Background ==
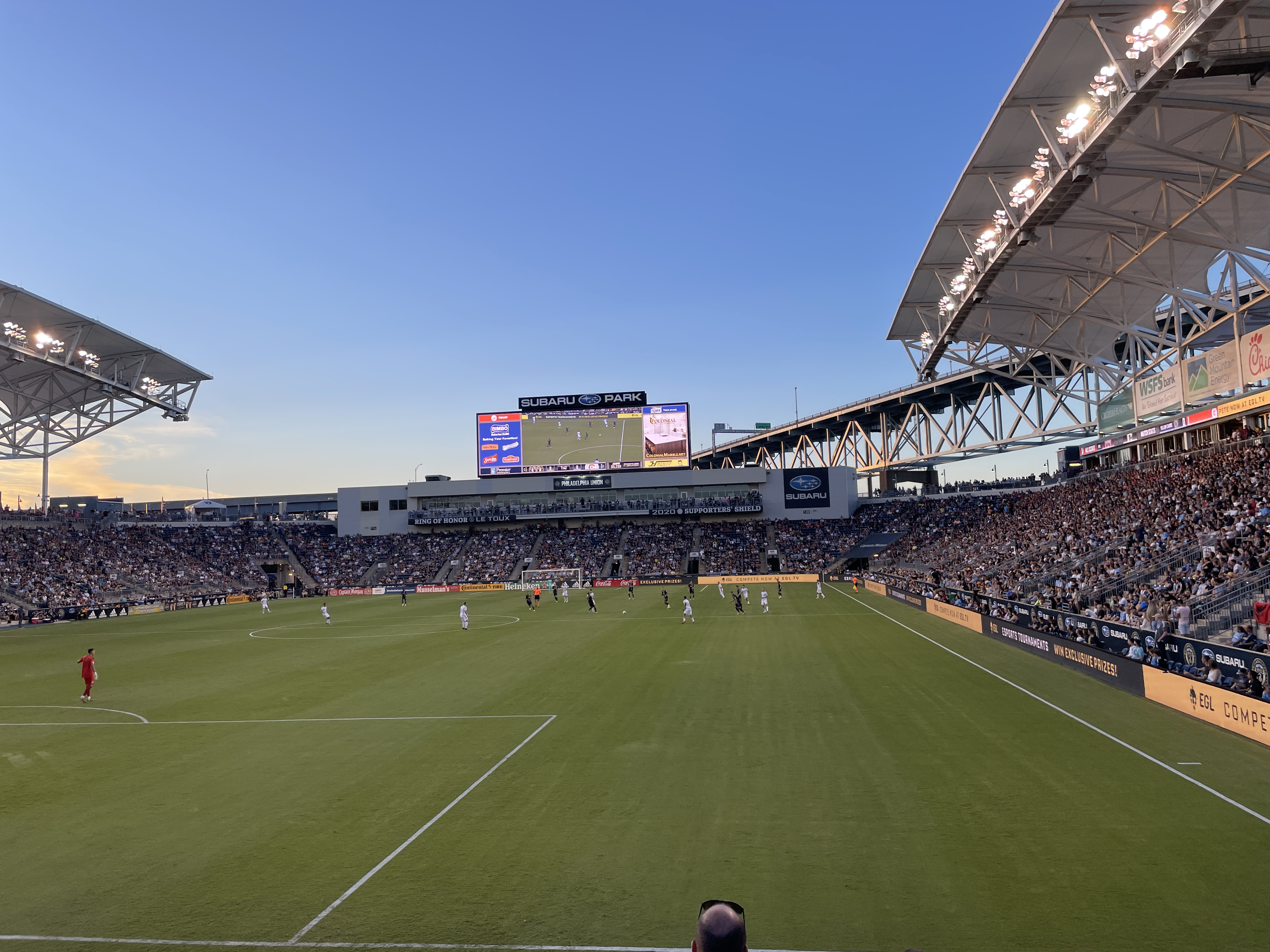
View of a regular season match at Subaru Park against Chicago Fire FC on August 13

Ahead of the 2022 season, the Union saw major front office departures; technical director, Chris Albright was hired as the new general manager of FC Cincinnati, and later assistant coach, Pat Noonan was announced as their new head coach. In January, former player and academy coach, Ryan Richter was promoted to assistant coach of the first team under Jim Curtin.

By mid-January, the Union had announced new contract agreements for starting centerbacks Jakob Glesnes and Jack Elliott, keeping both with the club through the 2024 season.

Ernst Tanner identified that part of the Union's offseason priorities were improving the forward/striker position. The first move for a new forward saw Julián Carranza, a young DP from Inter Miami CF, to be signed on loan for the 2022 season. In January, the Union traded their leading scorer (and 2021 CONCACAF Champions League Golden Boot winner), Kacper Przybyłko to the Chicago Fire FC for $1.15 million in allocation money. The outbound Przybyłko made way for the Union's marquee offseason signing in Danish Superliga Golden Boot winner, Mikael Uhre, to a three-year contract as a designated player. Signing Uhre broke the Union's transfer fee record reportedly at $2.8 million. In February, the Union traded designated player midfielder, Jamiro Monteiro, to the San Jose Earthquakes for up to $450,000 and an international roster spot for the 2022 season.

The Union traded away or passed on all picks for the 2022 MLS SuperDraft, being the fourth consecutive season doing so. Continuing to sign young players through the Union's academy, left-back, Anton Sorenson, was officially signed to the first team as a homegrown player in January. Previously Sorenson had been granted an emergency hardship call-up for the 2021 Eastern Conference final in December.

== 2022 roster ==
As of February 9, 2023

Note: Flags indicate national team as defined under FIFA eligibility rules; some limited exceptions apply. Players may hold more than one non-FIFA nationality.

No.	Pos.	Nation	Player
1	GK	USA	Matt Freese (HGP)
2	DF	USA	Matthew Real (HGP)
3	DF	ENG	Jack Elliott
5	DF	NOR	Jakob Glesnes
6	MF	HUN	Daniel Gazdag
7	FW	DEN	Mikael Uhre (DP)
8	MF	VEN	José Martínez
9	FW	ARG	Julián Carranza (DP)
11	MF	USA	Alejandro Bedoya (Captain)
12	GK	USA	Joe Bendik
13	MF	USA	Cole Turner (HGP)
14	MF	USA	Jeremy Rafanello (HGP)
15	DF	CMR	Olivier Mbaizo
16	MF	USA	Jack McGlynn (HGP)

No.	Pos.	Nation	Player
17	DF	GHA	Abasa Aremeyaw
18	GK	JAM	Andre Blake (GA)
19	FW	JAM	Cory Burke
20	MF	VEN	Jesús Bueno
21	MF	KEN	Richard Odada
24	DF	USA	Anton Sorenson (HGP)
25	FW	USA	Chris Donovan
26	DF	USA	Nathan Harriel (HGP)
27	DF	GER	Kai Wagner
30	MF	USA	Paxten Aaronson (HGP)
31	MF	USA	Leon Flach
33	MF	USA	Quinn Sullivan (HGP)
34	MF	USA	Brandan Craig (HGP)

== Transfers ==
=== In ===
Date	No.	Pos.	Player	Transferred from	Fee/notes	Source
January 24, 2022	24	DF	(United States) Anton Sorenson	(United States) Philadelphia Union II	Homegrown signing	
January 27, 2022	7	FW	(Denmark) Mikael Uhre	(Denmark) Brøndby	$2,800,000; signed as DP	
June 17, 2022	25	FW	(United States) Chris Donovan	(United States) Philadelphia Union II	Waivers	
July 13, 2022	9	FW	(Argentina) Julián Carranza	(United States) Inter Miami CF	$500,000 in GAM	
August 2, 2022	21	MF	(Kenya) Richard Odada	(Serbia) Red Star Belgrade	Free Agent	
August 4, 2022	17	DF	(Ghana) Abasa Aremeyaw	(Slovakia) MŠK Žilina	$220,000	
August 23, 2022	14	MF	(United States) Jeremy Rafanello	(United States) New York Red Bulls II	Homegrown signing	

=== Out ===
Date	No.	Pos.	Player	Transferred to	Fee/notes	Source
December 8, 2021	7	FW	(Brazil) Matheus Davó	(Brazil) Corinthians	Declined Contract Option	
December 8, 2021	21	MF	(United States) Anthony Fontana	(Italy) Ascoli	Declined bona fide offer	
December 8, 2021	25	MF	(Brazil) Ilsinho	Retired	Out of contract	
December 8, 2021	29	DF	(Jamaica) Alvas Powell	(United States) FC Cincinnati	Out of contract	
December 8, 2021	78	DF	(France) Aurélien Collin	Retired	Out of contract, later retired	
January 22, 2022	23	FW	(Poland) Kacper Przybyłko	(United States) Chicago Fire FC	$1,150,000 GAM	
February 14, 2022	10	MF	(Cape Verde) Jamiro Monteiro	(United States) San Jose Earthquakes	Up to $450,000 GAM, International roster spot	
July 7, 2022	14	MF	(United States) Jack de Vries	(Italy) Venezia	Transfer	
July 7, 2022	24	MF	(Slovakia) Matej Oravec	(Slovakia) Železiarne Podbrezová	Mutual Termination	
July 8, 2022	17	FW	(Brazil) Sérgio Santos	(United States) FC Cincinnati	Up to $625,000 GAM	
July 20, 2022	4	DF	(Scotland) Stuart Findlay	(England) Oxford United FC	Undisclosed	

=== Loan In ===
Date	No.	Pos.	Player	Loaned from	Fee/notes	Source
December 23, 2021	9	FW	(Argentina) Julián Carranza	(United States) Inter Miami CF	Loan with option to purchase; signed as Young DP	

=== Loan Out ===
Date	No.	Pos.	Player	Transferred to	Fee/notes	Source
April 21, 2021	24	MF	(Slovakia) Matej Oravec	(Slovakia) FK Železiarne Podbrezová	Loaned out through summer 2022	
August 31, 2021	14	MF	(United States) Jack de Vries	(Italy) Venezia F.C.	Loaned out through summer 2022	

== Competitions ==
=== Preseason ===
The Union's preseason fixtures were announced in January to be held during their preseason training in Clearwater, Florida.

February 3 Preseason 1	FC Cincinnati	1–1	Philadelphia Union	Clearwater, Florida
11:00 am	Kubo 36'	Report	Carranza 2'	Stadium: Joe DiMaggio Field

February 8 Preseason 2	CF Montreal	1–2	Philadelphia Union	Ft. Myers, Florida
6:17 pm	99'	Live blog Report	Real (yellow card) 61'; Burke 75'; Sullivan (yellow card) 86'; Darboe (yellow card) 103'; Aaronson 118'	Stadium: FGCU Soccer Complex
Note: Additional 30-minute period played following two 45-minute halves.

February 18 Preseason 3	Nashville SC	1–1	Philadelphia Union	Clearwater, Florida
12:00 pm	120+4'	Report	Wagner (yellow card) 51'; Glesnes 82' (Wagner)	Stadium: Joe DiMaggio Field
Note: Additional 30-minute period played following two 45-minute halves.

=== Major League Soccer ===
==== Standings ====
===== Eastern Conference =====
Pos	Team	Pld	W	L	T	GF	GA	GD	Pts	Qualification
1	Philadelphia Union	34	19	5	10	72	26	+46	67	Qualification for the conference semifinals and the CONCACAF Champions League
2	CF Montréal (Note: Canadian clubs could not qualify for the 2023 CONCACAF Champions League through the MLS regular season or playoffs.)	34	20	9	5	63	50	+13	65	Qualification for the first round
3	New York City FC	34	16	11	7	57	41	+16	55	Qualification for the first round
4	New York Red Bulls	34	15	11	8	50	41	+9	53	Qualification for the first round
5	FC Cincinnati	34	12	9	13	64	56	+8	49	Qualification for the first round

Source: MLS
Rules for classification: 1) points; 2) total wins; 3) total goal differential; 4) total goals scored; 5) fewer disciplinary points; 6) away goal differential; 7) away goals scored; 8) home goals differential; 9) home goals scored; 10) coin toss (2 clubs tied) or drawing of lots (≥3 clubs tied)

===== Overall table =====
Pos	Team	Pld	W	L	T	GF	GA	GD	Pts	
1	Los Angeles FC (C, S)	34	21	9	4	66	38	+28	67	Qualification for the CONCACAF Champions League (Note: As MLS Cup 2022 champions and 2022 MLS Supporters' Shield champions (USA1))
2	Philadelphia Union	34	19	5	10	72	26	+46	67	Qualification for the CONCACAF Champions League (Note: As 2022 Eastern Conference regular season champions (USA2))
3	CF Montréal (Note: Canadian clubs could not qualify for the 2023 CONCACAF Champions League through the MLS regular season or playoffs.)	34	20	9	5	63	50	+13	65	
4	Austin FC	34	16	10	8	65	49	+16	56	Qualification for the CONCACAF Champions League (Note: As highest-ranked U.S. based Division I club (based on 2022 MLS regular season record) not already qualified (USA3))
5	New York City FC	34	16	11	7	57	41	+16	55	

Source: MLS
Rules for classification: 1) points; 2) total wins; 3) total goal differential; 4) total goals scored; 5) fewer disciplinary points; 6) away goal differential; 7) away goals scored; 8) home goals differential; 9) home goals scored; 10) coin toss (2 clubs tied) or drawing of lots (≥3 clubs tied)
(C) Champions; (S) Supporters' Shield winners

==== Results summary ====
Overall								Home						Away					
Pld	Pts	W	L	T	GF	GA	GD	W	L	T	GF	GA	GD	W	L	T	GF	GA	GD
34	67	19	5	10	72	26	+46	12	0	5	49	9	+40	7	5	5	23	17	+6

Source: MLS (p. 22)
Pld = Matches played; Pts = Points; W = Matches won; T = Matches tied; L = Matches lost; GF = Goals for; GA = Goals against; GD = Goal difference

==== Results by round ====
Round	1	2	3	4	5	6	7	8	9	10	11	12	13	14	15	16	17	18	19	20	21	22	23	24	25	26	27	28	29	30	31	32	33	34
Stadium	H	A	H	A	H	H	A	H	A	A	H	H	A	A	H	H	A	A	H	A	H	A	H	A	H	A	A	H	H	A	H	A	A	H
Result	D	W	W	W	W	W	L	D	D	D	D	D	W	D	D	W	L	D	W	W	W	W	W	L	W	L	W	W	W	W	W	D	L	W

Source: MLS
A = Away; H = Home; W = Win; D = Draw; L = Loss

==== Results ====
February 26 1	Philadelphia Union	1–1	Minnesota United FC	Chester, Pennsylvania
1:00 PM EDT	Burke 35'; Glesnes (yellow card) 41'; Martinez (yellow card) 51'	Report	Lod 23', (yellow card) 79'; Boxall (yellow card) 74'; Reynoso (yellow card) 85'	Stadium: Subaru Park; Attendance: 17,487; Referee: Rubiel Vazquez

March 5 2	CF Montréal	1–2	Philadelphia Union	Montreal, Quebec
4:00 PM EDT	Koné (yellow card) 20'; Wanyama (yellow card) 23'; Lappalainen 32'; Zouhir (yellow card) 67'	Report	Bedoya 53'; Gazdag 56'; Carranza (yellow card) 64' (yellow-red card) 71'	Stadium: Stade Olympique; Referee: Drew Fischer

March 12 3	Philadelphia Union	2–0	San Jose Earthquakes	Chester, Pennsylvania
7:30 PM EDT	Burke 23'; Santos (yellow card) 27'; Gazdag (yellow card) 43', (goal) 58' (pen.); Harriel (yellow card) 62'	Report	Espinoza (yellow card) 11'; Remedi (yellow card) 26'; Bouda (yellow card) 90+2'	Stadium: Subaru Park; Attendance: 14,533; Referee: Victor Rivas

March 19 4	New York City FC	0–2	Philadelphia Union	New York, New York
1:00 PM EDT	Jasson (yellow card) 11'; Rodríguez (yellow card) 50'; Castellanos (yellow card) 72'; Magno (yellow card) 85'	Report	Bedoya 12'; Carranza (yellow card) 14'; Gazdag 33', (yellow card) 67'; Wagner (yellow card) 72'; Burke (yellow card) 73'	Stadium: Yankee Stadium; Referee: Ted Unkel

April 2 5	Philadelphia Union	2–0	Charlotte FC	Chester, Pennsylvania
7:30 PM EDT	Carranza 4'; Martinez (yellow card) 19'; Gazdag 46'; Aaronson (yellow card) 90+2'	Report		Stadium: Subaru Park; Attendance: 18,136; Referee: Timothy Ford

April 9 6	Philadelphia Union	1–0	Columbus Crew	Chester, Pennsylvania
6:00 PM EDT	Room 2' (o.g.); Sullivan (yellow card) 79'	Report	Moreira (yellow card) 66'	Stadium: Subaru Park; Attendance: 18,321; Referee: Armando Villarreal

April 16 7	Toronto FC	2–1	Philadelphia Union	Toronto, Ontario
7:30 PM EDT	Nelson (yellow card) 19'; Pozuelo (yellow card) 30', (goal) 51'; Jiménez 39'; Bradley (yellow card) 45+1'; Chung (yellow card) 75'	Report	Carranza 34', (yellow card) 53'	Stadium: BMO Field; Attendance: 20,809; Referee: Alex Chilowicz

April 23 8	Philadelphia Union	1–1	CF Montréal	Chester, Pennsylvania
7:30 PM EDT	Carranza 21' (pen.); Bedoya (yellow card) 55'; Martinez (yellow card) 82'; Wagner (yellow card) 90+1'	Report	Kamara 59'; Waterman (yellow card) 61'; Miller (yellow card) 90'; Bassong (yellow card) 90+3'	Stadium: Subaru Park; Attendance: 18,476; Referee: Lukasz Szpala

May 1 9	Nashville SC	1–1	Philadelphia Union	Nashville, Tennessee
4:00 PM EDT	Lovitz (yellow card) 33'; Muyl (yellow card) 37'; Davis (yellow card) 49'; Leal (yellow card) 76', (goal) 85' (pen.)	Report	Wagner (yellow card) 60'; Martínez (yellow card) 62'; Uhre 66'; Blake (yellow card) 84'	Stadium: Geodis Park; Attendance: 30,109; Referee: Chris Penso

May 7 10	Los Angeles FC	2–2	Philadelphia Union	Los Angeles, California
11:00 PM EDT	Opoku 56'; Palacios (yellow card) 76'; Escobar 82'	Report	Gazdag 9'; Carranza 67'; Santos (yellow card) 83'; Elliot (yellow card) 90+4'	Stadium: Banc of California Stadium; Attendance: 22,022; Referee: Jair Marrufo

May 14 11	Philadelphia Union	1–1	New York Red Bulls	Chester, Pennsylvania
7:30 PM EDT	Gazdag 47'	Report	D. Nealis (yellow card) 25' (yellow-red card) 55'; Luquinhas 66'	Stadium: Subaru Park; Attendance: 18,579; Referee: Rubiel Vazquez

May 18 12	Philadelphia Union	0–0	Inter Miami CF	Chester, Pennsylvania
7:30 PM EDT	Flach (yellow card) 19'	Report	Duke (yellow card) 60'	Stadium: Subaru Park; Attendance: 15,747; Referee: Fotis Bazakos

May 22 13	Portland Timbers	0–2	Philadelphia Union	Portland, Oregon
10:00 PM EDT	D. Chará (yellow card) 43'	Report	Gazdag 5'; Harriel (yellow card) 18'; Santos 48'; Carranza (yellow card) 81'; Burke (yellow card) 85'	Stadium: Providence Park; Attendance: 22,288; Referee: Allen Chapman

May 28 14	New England Revolution	1–1	Philadelphia Union	Foxborough, Massachusetts
7:30 PM EDT	Bou (yellow card) 52', (goal) 75' (pen.)	Report	Burke (yellow card) 63'; Uhre 77'; McGlynn (yellow card) 80'; Martínez (yellow card) 90+2'	Stadium: Gillette Stadium; Attendance: 20,398; Referee: Jon Freemon

June 18 15	Philadelphia Union	1–1	FC Cincinnati	Chester, Pennsylvania
7:30PM EDT	Bedoya 17'; Burke (yellow card) 64'	Report	Vazquez 39'; Medunjanin (yellow card) 55'; Nwobodo (yellow card) 57'; Hagglund (yellow card) 62'; Nelson (yellow card) 68'	Stadium: Subaru Park; Attendance: 18,717; Referee: Timothy Ford

June 26 16	Philadelphia Union	2–1	New York City FC	Chester, Pennsylvania
6:00PM EDT	Uhre 9'; Carranza (yellow card) 81'; Burke 90+6'	Report	Rodríguez (yellow card) 13'; Callens (yellow card) 79'; Castellanos (yellow card) 80', (goal) 89' (pen.); Moralez (yellow card) 87'	Stadium: Subaru Park; Attendance: 18,589; Referee: Armando Villarreal

June 29 17	Chicago Fire FC	1–0	Philadelphia Union	Chicago, Illinois
7:00 PM EDT	Terán (yellow card) 51'; Navarro 68'	Report	Martínez (yellow card) 29' (yellow-red card) 72'; Bedoya (yellow card) 35'; Wagner (yellow card) 77'; Gazdag (yellow card) 83'	Stadium: Soldier Field; Attendance: 10,384; Referee: Michael Radchuk

July 3 18	Columbus Crew	0–0	Philadelphia Union	Columbus, Ohio
7:30 EDT	Mensah (yellow card) 1'; Zelarayán (yellow card) 36'; Hurtado (yellow card) 39'; Santos (yellow card) 43'; Moreira (yellow card) 59'	Report	Elliot (yellow card) 39'; Bedoya (yellow card) 61'	Stadium: Lower.com Field; Attendance: 20,469; Referee: Nima Saghafi

July 8 19	Philadelphia Union	7–0	D.C. United	Chester, Pennsylvania
7:30 PM EDT	Bedoya 9', 37'; Carranza 22', 25', 72'; Uhre 45+2', 59'	Report	Birnbaum (yellow card) 36'; Odoi-Atsem (yellow card) 69'	Stadium: Subaru Park; Attendance: 19,007; Referee: Ted Unkel

July 13 20	Inter Miami CF	1–2	Philadelphia Union	Fort Lauderdale, Florida
8:00 PM EDT	Duke (yellow card) 45+3'; Higuaín 82'; Lowe (yellow card) 88'; Sailor (yellow card) 90+6'	Report	Gazdag 26' (pen.); Burke 66'; Bedoya (yellow card) 79'	Stadium: DRV PNK Stadium; Attendance: 10,027; Referee: Marcos de Oliveira

July 16 21	Philadelphia Union	2–1	New England Revolution	Chester, Pennsylvania
7:30 PM EDT	Uhre 75'; Gazdag 79' (pen.); Bedoya (yellow card) 90+4'	Report	Bou 61'	Stadium: Subaru Park; Attendance: 18,257; Referee: Rubiel Vazquez

July 23 22	Orlando City SC	0–1	Philadelphia Union	Orlando, Florida
7:30 pm	Kara (yellow card) 31'; Moutinho (yellow card) 37'; Araújo (yellow card) 63'	Report	Martínez (yellow card) 8'; Gazdag 39'; Carranza (yellow card) 44'	Stadium: Exploria Stadium; Attendance: 16,031; Referee: Alex Chilowicz

July 30 23	Philadelphia Union	6–0	Houston Dynamo FC	Chester, Pennsylvania
7:30 PM EDT	Gazdag 23'; McGlynn 42'; Uhre 45+1', 48'; Carranza 55'; Flach (yellow card) 85'; Sullivan 89'	Report	Vera (yellow card) 63'; Cerén (yellow card) 83'; Dorsey (yellow card) 90'	Stadium: Subaru Park; Attendance: 19,089; Referee: Kevin Stott

August 6 24	FC Cincinnati	3–1	Philadelphia Union	Cincinnati, Ohio
7:30PM EDT	Cameron (yellow card) 34'; Vazquez 50'; Acosta (yellow card) 54'; Brenner 55'; Hagglund (yellow card) 66'; Barreal 71'	Report	Aaronson 77'	Stadium: TQL Stadium; Attendance: 23,443; Referee: Drew Fischer

August 13 25	Philadelphia Union	4–1	Chicago Fire FC	Chester, Pennsylvania
7:30 PM EDT	Gazdag 16'; Bedoya (yellow card) 28'; Elliot 37'; Carranza 53', (yellow card) 86'; Burke 82', (yellow card) 85'; Mbaizo (yellow card) 90+1'	Report	Pineda (yellow card) 2'; Mueller 49'; Xherdan Shaqiri (yellow card) 70'; F. Navarro (yellow card) 82'	Stadium: Subaru Park; Attendance: 18,682; Referee: Ismail Elfath

August 17 26	FC Dallas	1–0	Philadelphia Union	Frisco, Texas
9:00 PM EDT	Ferreira 34', (yellow card) 75'; Martínez (yellow card) 62'	Report	Gazdag (yellow card) 73'; Mbaizo (yellow card) 75'	Stadium: Toyota Stadium; Attendance: 12,479; Referee: Nima Saghafi

August 20 27	D.C. United	0–6	Philadelphia Union	Washington, D.C.
4:30 p.m. EDT		Report	Uhre 37'; Gazdag 45+2' (pen.); Carranza 47', 70', 74'; Burke 79'	Stadium: Audi Field; Attendance: 17,941; Referee: Ted Unkel

August 27 28	Philadelphia Union	6–0	Colorado Rapids	Chester, Pennsylvania
7:30 PM EDT	Gazdag 9', 20' (pen.), 83'; Carranza 30' (pen.); Burke 87'; Real 90+1'	Report	Vallecilla (yellow card) 7' (yellow-red card) 35'; Priso-Mbongue (yellow card) 11'; Warner (yellow card) 27'	Stadium: Subaru Park; Attendance: 18,005; Referee: Allen Chapman

August 31 29	Philadelphia Union	4–1	Atlanta United FC	Chester, Pennsylvania
7:00 PM EDT	Carranza 18'; Bedoya (yellow card) 37'; Uhre 45+3', (yellow card) 51'; Gazdag 67'; Martínez (yellow card) 83'; McGlynn (yellow card) 90+3'; Harriel 90+5'	Report	Gutman 24'; Purata (yellow card) 47'; Dwyer (yellow card) 83'	Stadium: Subaru Park; Attendance: 18,214; Referee: Lukasz Szpala

September 3 30	New York Red Bulls	0–2	Philadelphia Union	Harrison, New Jersey
7:00PM EDT	Yearwood (yellow card) 90+3' (yellow-red card) 90+4'	Report	Glesnes (yellow card) 8'; Burke (yellow card) 32'; Elliott (yellow card) 36'; Uhre 48'; Gazdag 74', (yellow card) 83'	Stadium: Red Bull Arena; Attendance: 16,247; Referee: Timothy Ford

September 10 31	Philadelphia Union	5–1	Orlando City SC	Chester, Pennsylvania
7:30 PM EDT	João Moutinho 39' (o.g.); Uhre 43'; Gazdag 55' (pen.); Bedoya 63'; Flach (yellow card) 85'; Elliot 87'	Report	Rodrigo Schlegel (yellow card) 65'; Andrés Perea 75'	Stadium: Subaru Park; Attendance: 19,079; Referee: Armando Villarreal

September 17 32	Atlanta United FC	0–0	Philadelphia Union	Atlanta, Georgia
3:30 PM EDT	Sejdić (yellow card) 49'; Purata (yellow card) 62'	Report	Carranza (yellow card) 11'; Martinez (yellow card) 73'; Gazdag (yellow card) 90+7'	Stadium: Mercedes-Benz Stadium; Attendance: 42,521; Referee: Guido Gonzales Jr.

October 1 33	Charlotte FC	4–0	Philadelphia Union	Charlotte, North Carolina
5:30 PM EDT	Ríos 24', 54', 72' (pen.), 90+1'; Bronico (yellow card) 56'	Report	Wagner (yellow card) 39' (yellow-red card) 71'; Gazdag (yellow card) 79'	Stadium: Bank of America Stadium; Attendance: 43,860; Referee: Jon Freemon

October 9 34	Philadelphia Union	4–0	Toronto FC	Chester, Pennsylvania
2:00 PM EDT	Gazdag 4', 60' (pen.), 63'; Uhre 42'	Report	Bradley (yellow card) 29'; Mavinga (yellow card) 65'; Bernardeschi (yellow card) 81'	Stadium: Subaru Park; Attendance: 19,228; Referee: Lukasz Szpala

==== MLS Cup Playoffs ====
October 20 Conference Semi-finals	Philadelphia Union	1–0	FC Cincinnati	Chester, Pennsylvania
8:00 PM EDT	Flach 59', (yellow card) 63'; Mbaizo (yellow card) 68'; Gazdag (yellow card) 81'	Report	Hagglund (yellow card) 25'; Miazga (yellow card) 58'	Stadium: Subaru Park; Attendance: 19,289

October 30 Conference Finals	Philadelphia Union	3–1	New York City FC	Chester, Pennsylvania
8:00 PM EDT	Martinez (yellow card) 39'; Carranza 65'; Gazdag 67'; Burke 76'; Glesnes (yellow card) 90+3'	Report	Moralez 57'	Stadium: Subaru Park; Attendance: 19,770; Referee: Allen Chapman

===== MLS Cup =====
November 5 MLS Cup	Los Angeles FC	3–3 (a.e.t.) (3–0 p)	Philadelphia Union	Los Angeles, California
4:00 PM EDT	Acosta 28'; Murillo 83'; Bale 120+8'	Report	Gazdag 59'; Elliott 85', 120+4'	Stadium: Banc of California Stadium; Attendance: 22,384; Referee: Ismail Elfath
	Penalties
	Tello (penalty missed); Bouanga (penalty scored); Hollingshead (penalty scored); Sánchez (penalty scored)		(penalty missed) Gazdag; (penalty missed) Martínez; (penalty missed) Wagner

=== U.S. Open Cup ===
May 10 Round of 32	Orlando City (Florida)	2–1	(Pennsylvania) Philadelphia Union	Orlando, Florida
7:00 pm	Kara 54'; Perea 57'; Méndez (yellow card) 90+3'	Report	Real (yellow card) 13'; Martínez (yellow card) 68'; Findlay 77'; McGlynn (yellow card) 83'; Wagner (yellow card) 88'	Stadium: Exploria Stadium; Attendance: 7,601; Referee: Elvis Osmanovic

== Statistics ==
=== Appearances and goals ===
Last updated February 9, 2023

No.	Pos	Nat	Player	Total		MLS		USOC		MLS Cup Playoffs	
No.	Pos	Nat	Player	Apps	Goals	Apps	Goals	Apps	Goals	Apps	Goals
Goalkeepers
1	GK	(United States) USA	Matt Freese	1	0	0	0	1	0	0	0
12	GK	(United States) USA	Joe Bendik	0	0	0	0	0	0	0	0
18	GK	(Jamaica) JAM	Andre Blake	37	0	34	0	0	0	3	0
Defenders
2	DF	(United States) USA	Matthew Real	10	1	2+6	1	1	0	0+1	0
3	DF	(England) ENG	Jack Elliott	36	4	32	2	1	0	3	2
4	DF	(Scotland) SCO	Stuart Findlay (Note: Transferred out during the season)	5	1	4	0	1	1	0	0
5	DF	(Norway) NOR	Jakob Glesnes	38	0	34	0	0+1	0	3	0
15	DF	(Cameroon) CMR	Olivier Mbaizo	23	0	14+5	0	1	0	3	0
17	DF	(Ghana) GHA	Abasa Aremeyaw	0	0	0	0	0	0	0	0
24	DF	(United States) USA	Anton Sorenson	0	0	0	0	0	0	0	0
26	DF	(United States) USA	Nathan Harriel	25	1	20+5	1	0	0	0	0
27	DF	(Germany) GER	Kai Wagner	37	0	33	0	0+1	0	3	0
Midfielders
6	MF	(Hungary) HUN	Daniel Gazdag	38	24	34	22	1	0	3	2
8	MF	(Venezuela) VEN	José Martínez	34	0	29+1	0	0+1	0	3	0
11	MF	(United States) USA	Alejandro Bedoya	31	6	27+3	6	0	0	1	0
13	MF	(United States) USA	Cole Turner	0	0	0	0	0	0	0	0
14	MF	(United States) USA	Jack de Vries (Note: Loaned out during the season)	0	0	0	0	0	0	0	0
16	MF	(United States) USA	Jack McGlynn	27	1	9+14	1	1	0	2+1	0
21	MF	(Kenya) KEN	Richard Odada	0	0	0	0	0	0	0	0
24	MF	(Slovakia) SVK	Matej Oravec	0	0	0	0	0	0	0	0
30	MF	(United States) USA	Paxten Aaronson	23	1	2+19	1	1	0	0+1	0
31	MF	(United States) USA	Leon Flach	38	1	33+1	0	1	0	3	1
33	MF	(United States) USA	Quinn Sullivan	18	1	1+16	1	1	0	0	0
34	MF	(United States) USA	Brandan Craig	1	0	0+1	0	0	0	0	0
Forwards
7	FW	(Denmark) DEN	Mikael Uhre	30	13	21+6	13	0	0	3	0
9	FW	(Argentina) ARG	Julián Carranza	35	15	28+3	14	0+1	0	3	1
17	FW	(Brazil) BRA	Sergio Santos	12	1	8+3	1	0+1	0	0	0
19	FW	(Jamaica) JAM	Cory Burke	37	8	8+25	7	1	0	0+3	1
19	FW	(United States) USA	Chris Donovan	7	0	1+5	0	0	0	0+1	0

Source: Player Stats and Match reports in Competitions
