= Sébastien Le Toux =

French footballer (born 1984)

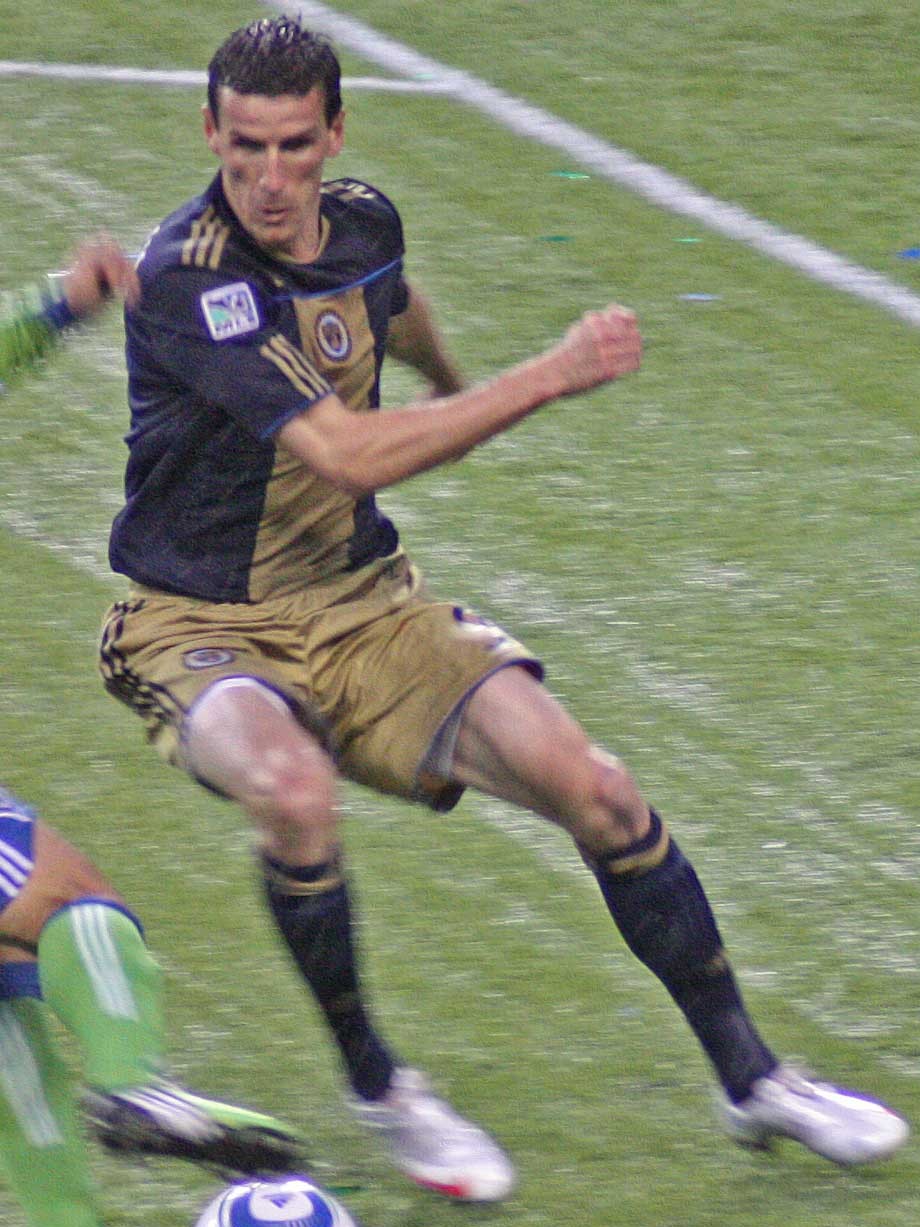
- Le Toux playing against Seattle

Personal information
- Date of birth: 10 January 1984 (age 42)
- Place of birth: Mont-Saint-Aignan, France
- Height: 6 ft 0 in (1.83 m)
- Positions: Forward; winger

Youth career
- 2001–2004: Rennes

Senior career*
Years	Team	Apps	(Gls)
2004–2006	Lorient	15	(1)
2007–2008	Seattle Sounders	47	(24)
2009	Seattle Sounders FC	32	(2)
2010–2011	Philadelphia Union	62	(25)
2012	Vancouver Whitecaps FC	19	(4)
2012	New York Red Bulls	14	(1)
2013–2016	Philadelphia Union	113	(25)
2016	Colorado Rapids	11	(1)
2017	D.C. United	16	(2)
Total		325	(84)
- * Club domestic league appearances and goals as of 17:45, 17 August 2017 (UTC)

Sébastien Le Toux (French pronunciation: [sebastjɛ̃ lə tu]; born 10 January 1984) is a French retired professional footballer who spent the majority of his career in Major League Soccer, including six seasons at the Philadelphia Union.

A versatile attacker, who in 2010 became Philadelphia's first All-Star representative, was widely regarded as one of the hardest workers in the league, winning the MLS Individual Fair Play Award in both 2010 and 2011. Le Toux racked up over 263 career MLS appearances with 59 goals and 57 assists in nine years.

== Playing career ==
=== Club ===
Le Toux was part of the youth setup at Rennes, and briefly played for Lorient in Ligue 2, prior to moving to the United States.

==== Seattle Sounders FC ====
Le Toux unsuccessfully tried out for MLS side FC Dallas, before eventually signing with the Seattle Sounders of the USL First Division in early 2007. Le Toux netted 10 goals for the Sounders in 2007, tying him with Charles Gbeke of the Montreal Impact as the division's top goal-scorer; he went on to score 24 goals in 54 league appearances for the team. On 28 September 2007, Le Toux became Seattle's fourth USL First Division Most Valuable Player.

On 8 May 2008, Le Toux was the first player signed by the Seattle Sounders FC following their expansion into Major League Soccer.

He scored the first goal in a 1–1 draw against the Los Angeles Galaxy, but saw more success in the Lamar Hunt U.S. Open Cup on the run to the 2009 Open Cup Final and had an assist on the winning goal to Roger Levesque in the 2–1 victory at RFK Stadium against D.C. United.

==== Philadelphia Union ====
Le Toux was not among Seattle's protected 11 players for the 2009 MLS Expansion Draft and was selected by Philadelphia Union. He scored a hat trick in the Philadelphia Union's first official home match in Major League Soccer as the Union defeated D.C. United 3–2. He scored his 10th goal of the season in the 33rd minute for the Union, taking a pass from rookie Danny Mwanga and sending a clean shot past Wizards goalkeeper Jimmy Nielsen. Le Toux scored on a penalty deep into stoppage time to give the Philadelphia Union a 2–1 win over Toronto FC. He scored once again against his former club Seattle Sounders, trailing 1–0 entering the second half, Le Toux got the equalizer on a penalty kick in the 54th minute. He finished the 2010 MLS season with 14 league goals. On 8 June, Le Toux was named a nominee for the Major League Soccer All-Star Game.

On 18 January 2012, he wrote "on a jet plane to England" the day after Bolton Wanderers manager Owen Coyle confirmed that the striker was having a trial with the Premier League side. The trial, however, did not lead to a contract offer.

==== Vancouver Whitecaps FC ====
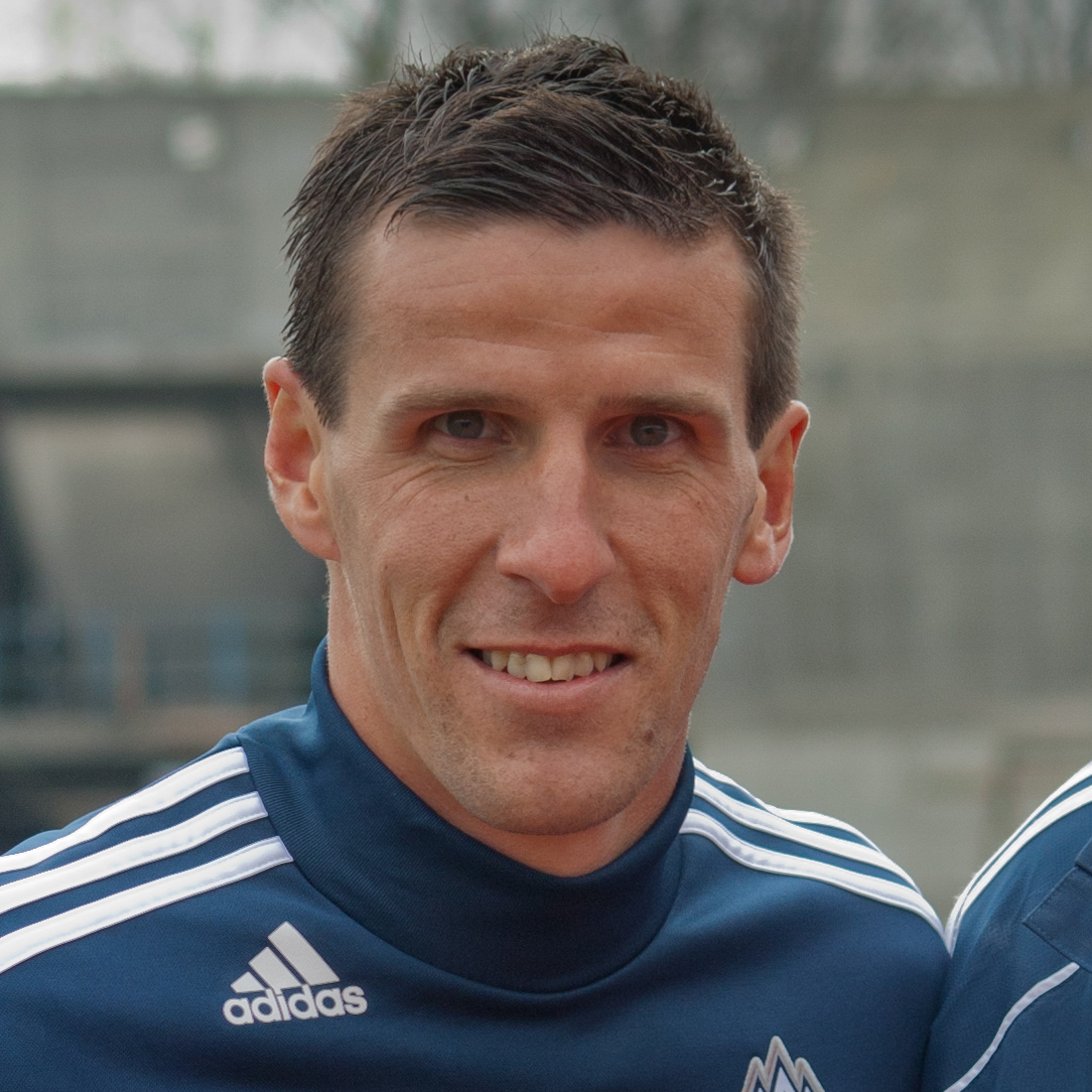
Le Toux at Burnaby Sports Complex West

On 31 January 2012, Philadelphia traded Le Toux to Vancouver Whitecaps FC for allocation money. Le Toux scored four minutes into his MLS debut for the Whitecaps on 10 March, a 2–0 home victory over new side Montreal Impact.

==== New York Red Bulls ====
Le Toux was traded to New York Red Bulls on 13 July 2012 in exchange for Dane Richards and allocation money. He scored 24 minutes into his first game with the Red Bulls vs. Seattle Sounders on 15 July 2012 in a match that ended in a 2–2 draw. In his second game, the 1–0 home win against Chicago Fire, Le Toux got the assist for a goal from Thierry Henry with a cross-field ball to the striker.

==== Return to Philadelphia ====
On 6 December 2012 Le Toux was traded back to Philadelphia Union in a sign-and-trade from New York Red Bulls. Philadelphia sent allocation money along with Josué Martínez to New York. He scored in the 17th minute of his debut back with the Philadelphia Union and the 2013 Major League Soccer season opener, doing so two consecutive seasons.

==== Colorado Rapids ====
On 3 August 2016, Le Toux was traded to the Colorado Rapids in exchange for General Allocation Money.

==== D.C. United ====
On 24 January 2017, Le Toux was signed to D.C. United as a free agent. He scored his first goal for DC against the New England Revolution on 22 April 2017. In the next game, he would score his second and last goal for DC against Atlanta United FC on 30 April 2017. Le Toux and United mutually agreed to terminate his contract on 17 August 2017.

=== Retirement ===
In May 2018, Le Toux announced his retirement from professional soccer. Making a name for himself as a top player for the Philadelphia Union, Le Toux signed a ceremonial one-day contract to retire as a Philadelphia player. His retirement ceremony was held on 23 June 2018 during a home match against Vancouver Whitecaps FC, where he was the first inductee into the Union's Ring of Honor.

== Post-playing career ==
After his retirement from professional soccer, Le Toux founded Le Toux Soccer Development in 2018, a private soccer coaching service he owns and operates.

During the 2019 season, Le Toux made his broadcast debut providing pregame, halftime, and postgame commentary during Philadelphia Union matches.

Currently, Le Toux is the Head Coach for the Shipley School Girls' Varsity Soccer team.

== Personal ==
Le Toux was born and raised in Rennes, France. He has two brothers and one sister.

He married Brittany Wollner on October 6, 2023

On 5 August 2010, it was announced that Le Toux has received a United States green card, making him a permanent resident of the country and qualifying him as a domestic player for MLS roster purposes.

== Career statistics ==
Club performance			League		Cup		League Cup		Total	
Club	Season	League	Apps	Goals	Apps	Goals	Apps	Goals	Apps	Goals
FC Lorient	2004–05	Ligue 2	12	0	0	0	1	0	13	0
FC Lorient	2005–06	Ligue 2	3	1	3	0	0	0	6	1
FC Lorient	Total		15	1	3	0	1	0	19	1
Seattle Sounders	2007	USL First Division	24	10	5	5	5	0	34	15
Seattle Sounders	2008	USL First Division	23	14	5	5	2	0	30	19
Seattle Sounders	Total		47	24	10	10	7	0	64	34
Seattle Sounders FC	2009	Major League Soccer	28	1	4	1	2	0	34	2
Philadelphia Union	2010	Major League Soccer	28	14	0	0	0	0	28	14
Philadelphia Union	2011	Major League Soccer	34	11	0	0	2	1	36	12
Philadelphia Union	Total		62	25	0	0	2	1	64	26
Vancouver Whitecaps FC	2012	Major League Soccer	19	4	2	2	0	0	21	6
New York Red Bulls	2012	Major League Soccer	14	1	1	0	0	0	15	1
Philadelphia Union	2013	Major League Soccer	32	3	2	0	0	0	34	3
Philadelphia Union	2014	Major League Soccer	29	12	5	3	0	0	34	15
Philadelphia Union	2015	Major League Soccer	31	8	5	2	0	0	36	10
Philadelphia Union	2016	Major League Soccer	21	2	3	0	0	0	24	2
Philadelphia Union	Total		113	25	15	5	0	0	128	30
Colorado Rapids	2016	Major League Soccer	14	1	0	0	0	0	14	1
D.C. United	2017	Major League Soccer	8	2	0	0	0	0	0	0
Career total			327	83	38	18	13	1	365	101

Source: Soccerway Stats

== Honors ==
=== Club ===
Stade Rennes Youth

- Coupe Gambardella: 2002–03

Seattle Sounders (USL)

- USL First Division Championship: 2007
- USL First Division Commissioner's Cup: 2007

Seattle Sounders FC

- Lamar Hunt U.S. Open Cup: 2009

=== Individual ===
- MLS 50/50 Club
- USL First Division Top Scorer: 2007
- Major League Soccer All Star Team: 2010
- MLS Fair Play Award: 2010, 2011
- MLS Best XI: 2010
- Philadelphia Union: Ring of Honor 2018
