= Jordan Harvey =

American soccer player

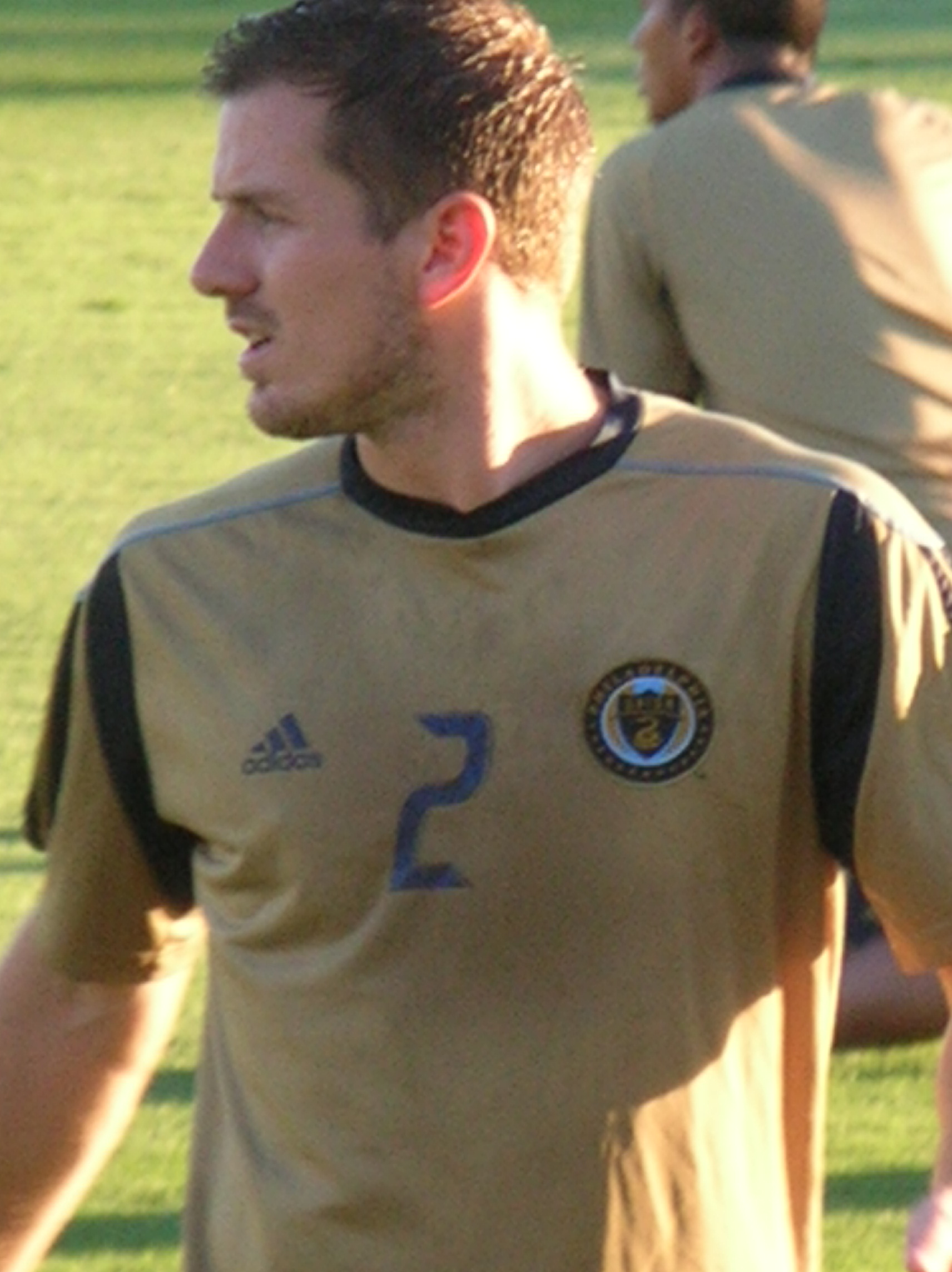
- Harvey in 2010

Personal information
- Full name: Jordan Harvey
- Date of birth: January 28, 1984 (age 42)
- Place of birth: Mission Viejo, California, United States
- Height: 5 ft 11 in (1.80 m)
- Position: Left-back

Youth career
- 1998–2002: Strikers FC

College career
Years	Team	Apps	(Gls)
2002–2005	UCLA Bruins	69	(7)

Senior career*
Years	Team	Apps	(Gls)
2005	Orange County Blue Star	15	(3)
2006–2009	Colorado Rapids	45	(0)
2006	→ Seattle Sounders (loan)	12	(1)
2010–2011	Philadelphia Union	46	(1)
2011–2017	Vancouver Whitecaps FC	179	(10)
2018–2021	Los Angeles FC	74	(1)
Total		371	(16)

International career^{‡}
2001	United States U17	2	(0)
2003	United States U20	1	(0)
- * Club domestic league appearances and goals as of November 27, 2021 ‡ National team caps and goals as of January 1, 2016

Jordan Harvey (born January 28, 1984) is an American former professional soccer player, currently serving as Assistant Technical at Major League Soccer club Los Angeles FC, with whom he finished his career as a player.

== Career ==
=== Youth and college ===
Harvey started playing club soccer with Strikers FC. Upon high school graduation he played college soccer at the University of California, Los Angeles for four years from 2002 to 2005 where he appeared in 69 games scoring 7 goals and notching 9 assists. During his college years he also played with Orange County Blue Star in the USL Premier Development League.

=== Professional career ===
Harvey was drafted in the first round, 9th overall, in the 2006 MLS Supplemental Draft by the Colorado Rapids, and remained with the club for a number of years. He was his team's the leader in minutes having played – 2,613 – in the 2009 MLS season

He was selected by Philadelphia Union in the 2009 MLS Expansion Draft on November 25, 2009. Harvey scored his first goal for the Union off a header on April 15, 2010, in a 2–1 loss to Toronto FC.

On July 7, 2011, Harvey was traded to the Vancouver Whitecaps FC in exchange for allocation money. Harvey established himself as one of the starting left backs during the 2012 season when Alain Rochat moved to defensive midfield towards the end of the season.

=== Personal Life ===
Harvey married American Idol star and contestant Kimberly Caldwell on New Year's Eve 2014 in Palm Springs, California.

=== International ===
Harvey played 2 matches for the United States U-17 national team in the 2001 FIFA U-17 World Cup and one match for the United States U-20 national team in the 2003 FIFA U-20 World Cup.

== Career statistics ==
As of October 29, 2019

Appearances and goals by club, season and competition
Club	Season	MLS		Playoffs		Cup (Note: Appearances in the U.S. Open Cup and Canadian Championship.)		Champions League		Total	
Club	Season	Apps	Goals	Apps	Goals	Apps	Goals	Apps	Goals	Apps	Goals
Colorado Rapids	2008	15	0	—		0	0	—		15	0
Colorado Rapids	2009	30	0	—		0	0	—		30	0
Colorado Rapids	Total	45	0	—		0	0	—		45	0
Philadelphia Union	2010	30	1	—		0	0	—		30	1
Philadelphia Union	2011	16	0	—		1	0	—		17	0
Philadelphia Union	Total	46	1	—		1	0	—		47	1
Vancouver Whitecaps FC	2011	14	0	—		0	0	—		14	0
Vancouver Whitecaps FC	2012	26	1	1	0	3	0	—		30	1
Vancouver Whitecaps FC	2013	24	4	—		4	0	—		28	4
Vancouver Whitecaps FC	2014	33	2	1	0	0	0	—		34	2
Vancouver Whitecaps FC	2015	26	0	2	0	4	0	—		32	0
Vancouver Whitecaps FC	2016	28	2	—		2	0	—		30	2
Vancouver Whitecaps FC	2017	28	1	1	0	0	0	4	0	33	1
Vancouver Whitecaps FC	Total	179	10	5	0	13	0	4	0	201	10
Los Angeles FC	2018	29	0	1	0	3	0	—		33	0
Los Angeles FC	2019	30	1	2	0	3	0	—		35	1
Los Angeles FC	Total	59	1	3	0	6	0	—		68	1
Career total		329	12	8	0	20	0	4	0	361	12

== Honors ==
Vancouver Whitecaps FC

- Canadian Championship: 2015

Los Angeles FC

- Supporters' Shield: 2019

Individual

- Vancouver Whitecaps FC Player of the Year: 2016

== Personal Life ==
Harvey married American Idol star and contestant Kimberly Caldwell on New Year's Eve 2014 in Palm Springs, California.
