= Brad Knighton =

American soccer player

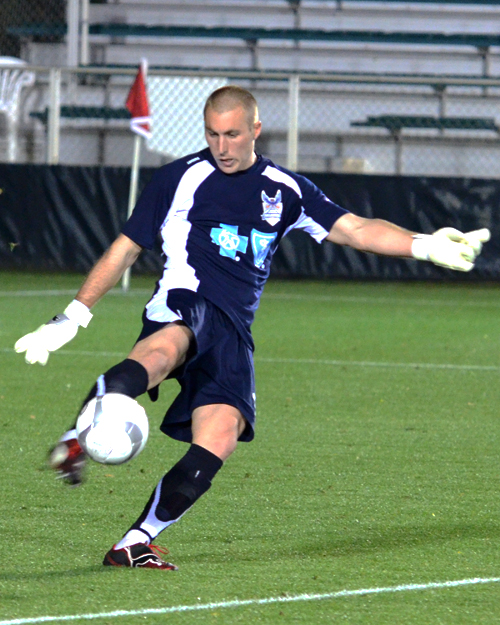
- Knighton with Carolina RailHawks in 2011

Personal information
- Full name: Bradley Burton Knighton
- Date of birth: February 6, 1985 (age 41)
- Place of birth: Hickory, North Carolina, United States
- Height: 6 ft 2 in (1.88 m)
- Position: Goalkeeper

College career
Years	Team	Apps	(Gls)
2003–2006	UNCW Seahawks		

Senior career*
Years	Team	Apps	(Gls)
2006	Indiana Invaders	11	(0)
2007–2009	New England Revolution	6	(0)
2008	→ Portland Timbers (loan)	8	(0)
2010	Philadelphia Union	8	(0)
2011	Carolina RailHawks	28	(0)
2012–2013	Vancouver Whitecaps FC	21	(0)
2014–2022	New England Revolution	50	(0)
2015	→ Richmond Kickers (loan)	1	(0)
2021	New England Revolution II	2	(0)
- * Club domestic league appearances and goals as of October 13, 2022

Bradley Burton Knighton (born February 6, 1985) is an American former professional soccer player. He is currently the Goalkeeper coach for Revolution II.

== Youth ==
Knighton Was born in Hickory, North Carolina, on February 6, 1985 but was raised in Richmond, Virginia. Knighton played his entire youth career with Richmond Strikers Soccer Club. During this period he earned an invite to the US Youth Soccer’s Olympic Development Program. As a senior at Mills E. Godwin High School, Knighton led the team to an undefeated record of 22-0 and a state championship.

== College and amateur soccer ==
Knighton played four years of college soccer at UNC-Wilmington. During his time with Wilmington he would be named a two-time All-State selection and two-time All-CAA pick, including First-Team during his senior year in 2006. He was named to the NSCAA/Adidas All-Region team following an outstanding final season with the Seahawks. He played a record 6,891 minutes for the program’s goalkeepers. He ranks second all-time in goals against average 1.08, games play (75) and games started in goal 73.

Prior to his junior year in college, Knighton spent three weeks training with then English Premier League side Middlesbrough FC. During his senior year he went to Spain to train with Burjassot CF.

He would also play for the Indiana Invaders in the USL Premier Development League.

== Professional career ==
Undrafted by Major League Soccer, he attended a New England Revolution tryout in early 2007 and was good enough to be invited on trial for the preseason. He impressed during the trial in Bermuda, winning a spot as the Revolution's third-choice keeper and a developmental contract with the club. The signing made him the first soccer player from UNC-Wilmington to be on a MLS roster.

After spending his first year and a half with the Revs behind Matt Reis and Doug Warren, he was loaned to the Portland Timbers on July 2, 2008, for the remainder of the 2008 Major League Soccer season. The move was aimed at getting Knighton some valuable playing time as he had seen no first team action while with New England. He has now moved on to coaching the academy .

Knighton was selected by Philadelphia Union in the 2009 MLS Expansion Draft on November 25, 2009. His first action with the team was a start in a friendly against Manchester United in which he allowed no goals before being replaced at halftime. He made his league debut for Philadelphia on August 8, 2010, against FC Dallas away, but was sent off for denying of an obvious goalscoring opportunity in 22nd minute. In his next start, he shut out the Chicago Fire at PPL Park on September 11, 2010, earning his first professional clean sheet, and also Philadelphia's first in franchise history. He was given a second consecutive start of the season vs. San Jose but was not able to hold down the starting position over the rest of the season, finishing with just 8 appearances.

On January 25, 2011, Knighton was waived by Philadelphia. In April 2011 he signed with Carolina RailHawks FC of the North American Soccer League. That year he played every minute for the club and finished runner-up for the league’s Golden Glove award after recording eight clean sheets and a goals-against average of 0.94 in 28 starts. He helped lead the team to a regular season title and being named NASL Best XI, however they lost in the playoff semifinals to NSC Minnesota Stars in a penalty shootout.

Knighton signed with Vancouver Whitecaps FC of MLS in January 2012. After Joe Cannon, the starting goaltender for most of the season, had a blunder against the Portland Timbers in August 2012, Knighton established himself as the starting goalkeeper.

Knighton was traded back to New England in December 2013 in exchange for a conditional pick in the 2015 MLS SuperDraft.

Knighton would spend the last 7 years of his career with the revolution mainly in a backup role. In 2016 Knighton was pivotal in the team’s run to the Lamar Hunt U.S. Open Cup Final, starting four matches in the tournament. In 2021 he would appear in 6 games going 5-1 with 3 clean sheets as the revolution went on to win the Supporters shield. He would play his final season in 2022 before ultimately retiring. He would finish his time in the MLS with 82 starts and 85 appearances overall. A 33-29-20 record with 19 cleans sheets.

== Managerial career ==
After retirement Knighton would stay a member of the Revolution now in a Managerial role. On January 4th 2023 he would be named manager of revolution U19 academy team. In just his first year he would lead the team to a MLS NEXT Cup championship. He would stay as head coach for one more year the following season.

On January 25th 2025 he was named the goalkeeping coach of the Revolution 2.

== Career statistics ==
=== Club ===
As of match played May 5, 2024

Appearances and goals by club, season and competition
Club	Season	League			National Cup		Other		Total	
Club	Season	Division	Apps	Goals	Apps	Goals	Apps	Goals	Apps	Goals
Indiana Invaders	2006	USL PDL	11	0	—		—		11	0
New England Revolution	2007	MLS	0	0	—		0	0	0	0
New England Revolution	2008	MLS	0	0	—		0	0	0	0
New England Revolution	2009	MLS	6	0	—		0	0	6	0
Portland Timbers (loan)	2008	USL-1	8	0	—		—		8	0
Philadelphia Union	2010	MLS	8	0	—		—		8	0
Carolina RailHawks	2011	NASL	28	0	—		—		28	0
Vancouver Whitecaps FC	2012	MLS	10	0	2	0	1 (Note: Appearance(s) in MLS Cup Playoffs)	0	13	0
Vancouver Whitecaps FC	2013	MLS	11	0	4	0	—		15	0
Vancouver Whitecaps FC	Total		21	0	6	0	1	0	28	0
New England Revolution	2014	MLS	2	0	3	0	0	0	5	0
New England Revolution	2015	MLS	3	0	1	0	0	0	4	0
New England Revolution	2016	MLS	13	0	4	0	—		17	0
New England Revolution	2017	MLS	6	0	3	0	—		9	0
New England Revolution	2018	MLS	7	0	1	0	—		8	0
New England Revolution	2019	MLS	8	0	0	0	0	0	8	0
New England Revolution	2020	MLS	1	0	—		0	0	1	0
New England Revolution	2021		6	0	0	0			6	0
New England Revolution	2022		4	0	0	0	0	0	4	0
New England Revolution	Total		56	0	12	0	0	0	58	0
Richmond Kickers (loan)	2015	USL	1	0	—		—		1	0
New England Revolution II	2021	MLS Next Pro	2	0					2	0
Career total			136	0	18	0	1	0	142	0

== Honors ==
New England Revolution

- Supporters' Shield: 2021

Carolina Riverhawks

- NASL Supporters Cup: 2011

individual

- New England Revolution Humanitarian of the Year: 2022
- UNC Wilmington hall of fame (2018)
- NASL Best XI: 2011
- NSCAA/Adidas All-Region: 2006
- 2x All-CAA pick
- 2x All-State selection

Managerial

- U19 MLS next cup champion: 2023

== Personal life ==
During his playing days, Knighton was a steady presence in the New England community. Knighton showed his support of countless charitable initiatives, working with Special Olympics Massachusetts and the Revolution Unified Team. Knighton was also consistently involved in the club’s efforts to support childhood cancer patients as a regular volunteer with Binkeez for Comfort and a mainstay on the club’s visits to local hospitals.

Knighton is married and has three children. In 2023 Knighton’s daughter Olivia tragically died in a boating accident. In 2024 Knighton and his wife started the Olivia foundation in honor of their late daughter. The organization's goal is make a difference in all the ways the couple think Olivia would have wanted. So far they have hosted holiday toy drives in her name. They are also aiming to establish a scholarship program at Attleboro High School. Knighton’s alma mater UNC Wilmington have also started holding an annual Olivia night game.
