= David Myrie =

Costa Rican footballer (born 1988)

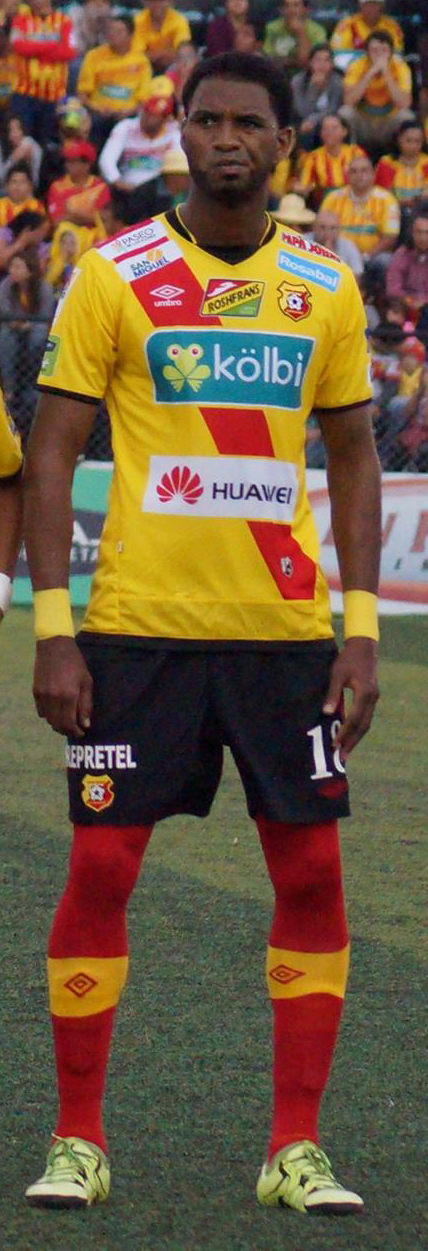
- Myrie playing for Herediano in 2017

Personal information
- Full name: David Andrew Myrie Medrano
- Date of birth: 1 June 1988 (age 38)
- Place of birth: Puerto Viejo, Costa Rica
- Height: 1.85 m (6 ft 1 in)
- Position: Defender

Youth career
- 2001–2005: Limón

Senior career*
Years	Team	Apps	(Gls)
2005–2007	Cádiz		
2006–2007	→ Barbate (loan)	5	(1)
2007–2008	Puntarenas	11	(0)
2008–2009	Alajuelense	14	(0)
2009	Chicago Fire	0	(0)
2010	Philadelphia Union	1	(0)
2010–2011	Limón	21	(2)
2011	Fredrikstad	2	(1)
2012	Limón	12	(0)
2012–2013	Uruguay	29	(4)
2013–2016	Herediano	103	(5)
2016	San Carlos	8	(0)
2017	Deportivo Saprissa	21	(1)
2017–2018	Pérez Zeledón	33	(0)
2019	Limón		

International career
	Costa Rica U17	4	(0)
2007	Costa Rica U20	3	(0)
2010–2019	Costa Rica	24	(0)
- * Club domestic league appearances and goals

David Andrew Myrie Medrano (born 1 June 1988) is a Costa Rican former professional footballer who played as a defender.

== Club career ==
Myrie started his professional career with Cádiz of the Spanish Segunda División. He later moved back to Costa Rica, play with both Puntarenas, and Alajuelense. Myrie made 12 appearances for Puntarenas during the 2007–08 season and 16 appearances for Alajuelense during the 2008–09 season.

=== Major League Soccer ===
Myrie signed for the Chicago Fire on 15 September 2009, but did not make any league appearances for the club. Myrie was subsequently selected by Philadelphia Union in the 2009 MLS Expansion Draft on 25 November 2009, before he had made his senior debut for Chicago. On 30 March 2010 Myrie was released by the Philadelphia Union, despite starting in the club's inaugural game.

On 2 August 2011 Myrie was announced as the new player of Fredrikstad Fotballklubb (FFK) Myrie was signed as a replacement for Cristian Gamboa, who was sold to FC København one day before Myrie came to Fredrikstad.

On 27 May 2013 Myrie was signed by Herediano of the Primera División de Costa Rica.

== International career ==
Myrie was part of the Costa Rican 2005 FIFA U-17 World Championship squad as well as the 2007 FIFA U-20 World Cup squad.

He made his senior debut for Costa Rica in a November 2010 friendly match against Jamaica and has, as of May 2014, earned a total of 12 caps, scoring no goals. He was a last minute inclusion in the 2014 FIFA World Cup squad after injury to Heiner Mora and played one game in Brazil. He also played at the 2011 Copa Centroamericana.

== Personal life ==
David is the younger brother of fellow Costa Rican international defender Roy Myrie.
