= Andrew Jacobson =

American soccer player (born 1985)

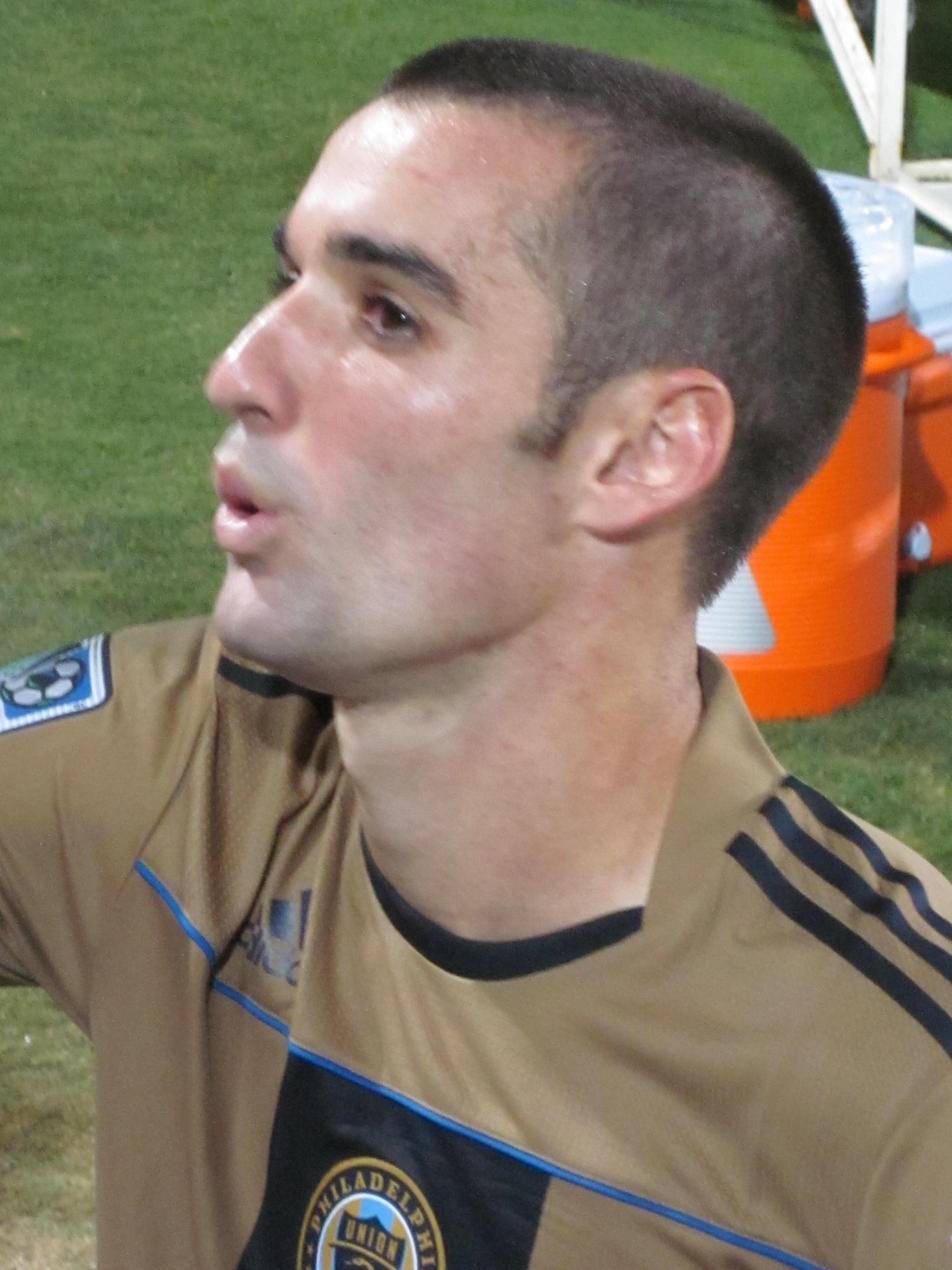

Personal information
- Full name: Andrew Jacobson
- Date of birth: September 25, 1985 (age 41)
- Place of birth: Fort Myers, Florida, U.S.
- Height: 6 ft 2 in (1.88 m)
- Position: Midfielder

College career
Years	Team	Apps	(Gls)
2003–2007	California Golden Bears	83	(11)

Senior career*
Years	Team	Apps	(Gls)
2008–2009	Lorient	0	(0)
2009	D.C. United	17	(0)
2010	Philadelphia Union	25	(0)
2011–2014	FC Dallas	98	(5)
2014–2016	New York City FC	33	(1)
2014	→ Stabæk (loan)	14	(1)
2016–2017	Vancouver Whitecaps FC	47	(4)
Total		234	(11)
- * Club domestic league appearances and goals as of 12:33, October 23, 2017 (UTC)

Andrew Jacobson (born September 24, 1985) is an American retired professional soccer player who played as a midfielder.

== Early life ==
Jacobson was born in Fort Myers, Florida. He attended Gunn High School, where he was named 2003 Central Coast Section Player of the Year, and played college soccer at UC Berkeley from 2003 to 2006, where he was named to the all Pac-10 team three times.

== Professional career ==
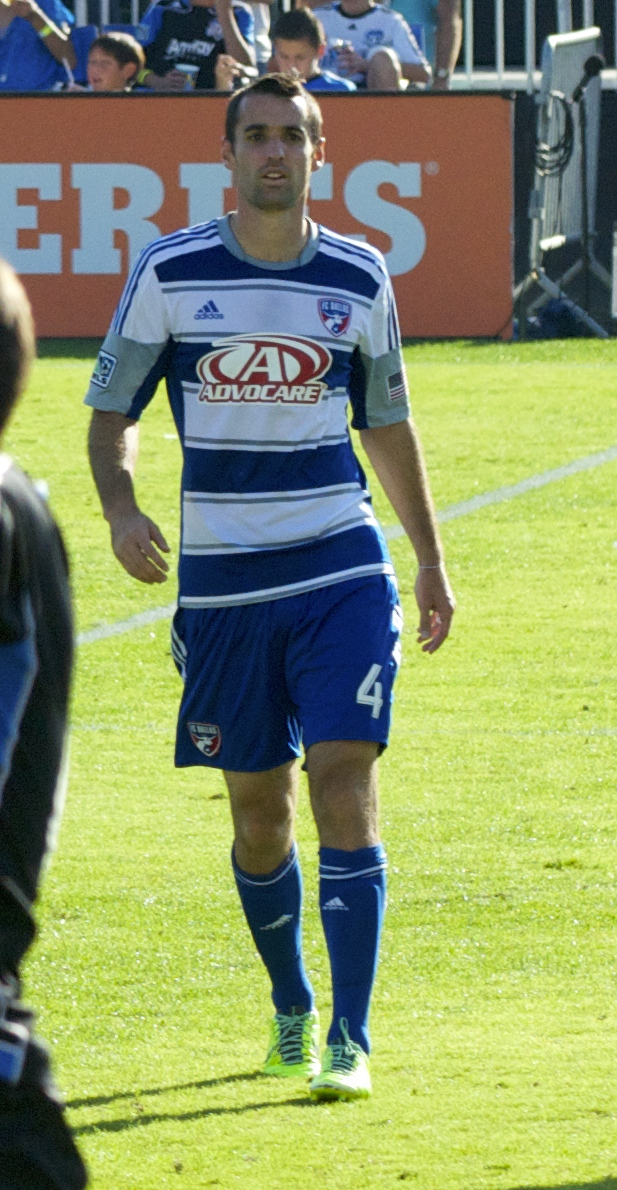
Playing for FC Dallas in 2013

Jacobson was the 24th overall pick in the 2008 MLS SuperDraft and the first pick by D.C. United. However, instead of playing in MLS, Jacobson signed a contract with Lorient of France’s Ligue 1. However, injuries limited his playing time, and he never played a first team game for Les Merlus.

Despite trialling with several clubs in Europe, Jacobson returned to MLS in 2009 and was allocated to the team which originally drafted him, D.C. United. He made his United debut as a substitute in DC's first game of the 2009 MLS season against Los Angeles Galaxy.

Jacobson was selected by Philadelphia Union in the 2009 MLS Expansion Draft on November 25, 2009.

Jacobson was traded to FC Dallas on February 18, 2011, in exchange for a second-round pick in the 2013 MLS SuperDraft. He scored his first professional goal on May 28, 2011, while playing for Dallas against Houston Dynamo.

After three and a half years served at the Texas club, Jacobson was traded to New York City FC for a third-round pick in the 2016 MLS SuperDraft, becoming only their fifth ever player. As the new expansion club was not due to begin competitive games until 2015, he was immediately loaned out to Stabæk IF of the Tippeligaen in Norway to preserve his match fitness. He returned to NYC for the 2015 season and appeared in 33 matches.

On March 11, 2016, NYC traded Jacobson to Vancouver Whitecaps FC in exchange for targeted allocation money. Jacobson announced his retirement on January 17, 2018.

=== International ===
Jacobson was named to the United States national futsal team and was a substitute in four matches at the 2008 FIFA Futsal World Cup in Brazil.

Sporting positions
Preceded by David Ferreira	FC Dallas captain 2014–2014	Succeeded by Matt Hedges
