= Stefani Miglioranzi =

Brazilian-American footballer (born 1977)

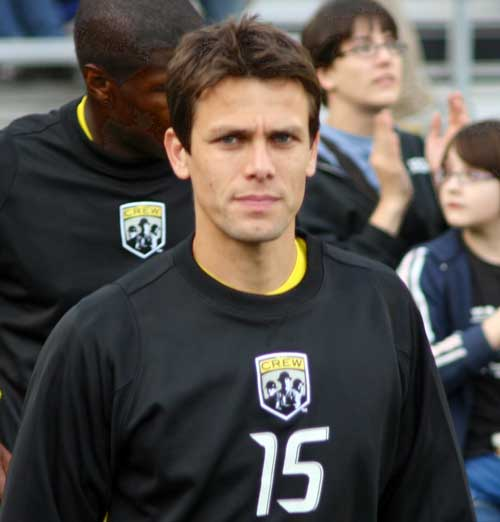
- Miglioranzi with the Columbus Crew in 2008

Personal information
- Full name: Stefani Miglioranzi
- Date of birth: September 20, 1977 (age 49)
- Place of birth: Poços de Caldas, Brazil
- Height: 6 ft 1 in (1.85 m)
- Position: Midfielder

College career
Years	Team	Apps	(Gls)
1995–1998	St. John's Red Storm		

Senior career*
Years	Team	Apps	(Gls)
1999–2002	Portsmouth	35	(2)
2002–2006	Swindon Town	124	(8)
2006	Los Angeles Galaxy	3	(0)
2007–2008	Columbus Crew	37	(3)
2009	Los Angeles Galaxy	23	(0)
2010–2011	Philadelphia Union	43	(0)
Total		265	(13)
- * Club domestic league appearances and goals as of November 7, 2011

Stefani Miglioranzi (born September 20, 1977) is an American former professional soccer player who played as a midfielder. After a successful playing career that spanned 18 years, Stefani Miglioranzi retired from playing professionally and became a Registered Intermediary and licensed FIFA match agent for First Wave Sports International, a full service agency for professional soccer players / footballers.

== Early life and college ==
Born in Brazil, Miglioranzi moved with his family to the United States when he was 12. He played for FC Westchester as youth player from 12–19 years old. He attended St. John's University in New York City on an athletic scholarship, where he won the 1996 NCAA Championship and also was a member of the 1998 All-American team.

Miglioranzi was drafted by the Chicago Fire in the third round of the 1999 MLS College Draft with the final pick of the draft, but turned down the offer, having already been offered a contract to play in England.

== Club career ==
=== Portsmouth ===
He went to England in 1998 to take part in trials with Everton and Portsmouth, where manager Alan Ball offered a 3-year contract. Bolton Wanderers were also heavily interested at the time.

=== Swindon Town ===
Miglioranzi signed for Swindon in July 2002, after a successful trial spell prompted Andy King to offer him a deal. Due to worries over a serious knee injury he picked up whilst at Portsmouth, his original contract was on a month-to-month basis. He made his debut for the club on the opening day of the 2002/03 season, in a 3–1 win over Barnsley.

Despite the fears for his fitness, Miglioranzi missed just five league games in his first season at the club, and he scored four goals in total - all of which were from the edge of the Penalty area. During this period, there were fears he would be poached, as he remained on a monthly contract - these fears were allayed in May 2003, when, after a good season, he agreed a year's deal, with a second year triggered if a certain number of appearances were reached.

A number of nagging injuries during 2003/04 meant that the extension was not automatically triggered. Miglioranzi had another good season, including a game in the League Cup match at Leeds United (where he missed one of the penalties in the shootout), and only struggled for form when he was rushed back to the first team after groin and ankle injuries kept him out of the side during January and March. Injury also meant that he missed the final game of the season, and the first leg of the play-off semi-final against Brighton and Hove Albion - nevertheless, he was offered a new two-year contract in May 2004, which he signed.

Miglioranzi started the first four games of the 2004/05 season, but went off injured in the first half at Bristol City, and he missed two league games. Worse was to follow at the end of September however, when he ruptured an abductor muscle in a home match with Bradford City - an injury that kept him out of the first team for nearly four months - his rehabilitation not helped by a lack of reserve team fixtures during his comeback. Eventually, he played seventy minutes of a Wiltshire Premier Shield semi-final tie against Supermarine in mid-December, giving a performance that he himself described as "appalling". It was another month before he appeared in the first team, coming on as a late substitute in a home game with Blackpool in mid-January, before being recalled to the starting line-up the following week. In truth, it was probably a bit too soon - Miglioranzi looked to lack any sort of match fitness, and he spent most of February back on the substitutes bench. He returned to the starting eleven in mid-March at table-topping Luton Town, and missed just two more matches toward the end of the season with a cyst on the back of his knee, before returning in an unfamiliar central defensive role for the final game of the campaign.

Having declared that the past season had been disappointing for him, both on the pitch and in terms of injuries, Miglioranzi saw a consultant and returned to pre-season training early in a bid to put his injury woes behind him. No sooner as he declared that he was feeling the best he had for a long time during the build-up, a sprained ankle picked up in a friendly at Aylesbury United forced him to miss the opening four matches of the season - and his campaign started as a second-half substitute in a 4–2 victory over Yeovil Town at the end of August. Just a month later though, Miglioranzi's injury curse struck again, as he hobbled off part way through a home game with Bradford - the medial ligament strain he sustained keeping him out of action for over a month.

He returned to league action with a great performance in a local derby with Bristol City that the Town won 2-1 - but a dead leg he picked up in that game kept him out of the following match - he returned to action the following week and remained in the side for the rest of the year, helping the Town to an undefeated December. Miglioranzi though failed to produce the form of his first two seasons at the club, and in every match in which he featured for the rest of the season, he was either substitute, or substituted - Gareth Whalley taking over his position in mid-March. A first-half substitute appearance versus MK Dons in mid-April proved to be Miglioranzi's last in a Town shirt - a knee injury that lead to surgery preventing him from featuring in any of the Town's last four matches - and come the season's end, it was a mutual decision that he would seek a fresh challenge elsewhere.

Several English clubs were rumoured to be interested in Miglioranzi after the announcement that he would leave Swindon - clubs included the Town's bitter rival Oxford United. However, Miglioranzi rejected the chance to talk to the Non-League outfit.

=== Return to MLS ===
In 2006, Miglioranzi signed with the Los Angeles Galaxy in Major League Soccer, but was traded to Columbus Crew in 2007 after making just three appearances for Galaxy. Miglioranzi spent two years in Ohio, winning the MLS Cup, the MLS Supporters' Shield and the Trillium Cup in 2008, before being traded back to Galaxy on January 9, 2009, in exchange for a conditional fourth-round selection in the 2010 MLS SuperDraft.

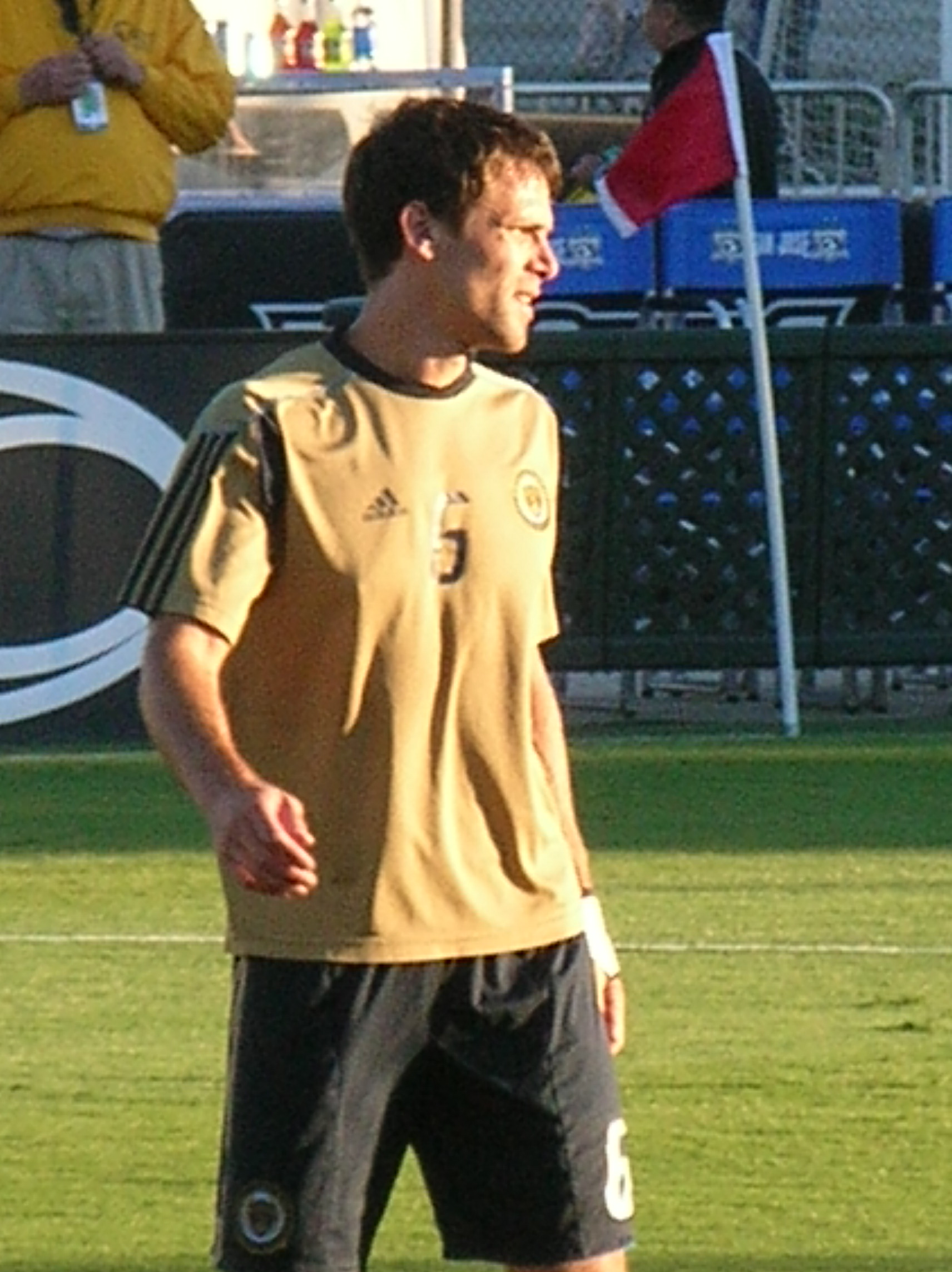
Miglioranzi playing for Philadelphia Union in 2010.

Miglioranzi was selected by Philadelphia Union in the 2009 MLS Expansion Draft on November 25, 2009. He stayed with Philadelphia for two seasons. After the 2011 season the club declined his 2012 contract option and he entered the 2011 MLS Re-Entry Draft. Miglioranzi was not selected in the draft and became a free agent.

=== Retirement ===
After retiring, Miglioranzi became a USSF registered players' agent and holds a FIFA Match Agent License. He currently is the president of First Wave Sports International.

== Honors ==
Columbus Crew

- Major League Soccer: 2008
- MLS Cup: 2008
- Supporters' Shield: 2008

Los Angeles Galaxy

- Major League Soccer: 2009

St. John's University

- NCAA Championship: 1996

== Career statistics ==
Updated October 30, 2011

	Season	Football League Championship		FA Cup		League Cup		Europe		Total
	Season	App	Goals	App	Goals	App	Goals	App	Goals	App	Goals
Portsmouth	1998-99	7	0	0	0	0	0	-	-	7	0
Portsmouth	1999-00	13	2	1	0	3	0	-	-	17	2
Portsmouth	2000-01	12	0	0	0	2	0	-	-	14	0
Portsmouth	2001-02	3	0	0	0	1	0	-	-	4	0
Portsmouth	Club Total	35	2	1	0	6	0	0	0	42	2
	Season	Football League One		FA Cup		League Cup		Europe		Total
	Season	App	Goals	App	Goals	App	Goals	App	Goals	App	Goals
Swindon Town	2002-03	41	3	1	0	1	0	-	-	43	3
Swindon Town	2003-04	36	4	1	0	2	0	-	-	39	4
Swindon Town	2004-05	21	0	0	0	1	0	-	-	22	0
Swindon Town	2005-06	26	1	1	0	0	0	-	-	27	1
Swindon Town	Club Total	124	8	3	0	4	0	0	0	131	8
	Season	MLS		U.S. Open Cup		MLS Cup Playoffs		North America		Total
	Season	App	Goals	App	Goals	App	Goals	App	Goals	App	Goals
Los Angeles Galaxy	2006	3	0	?	?	-	-	?	?	3	0
Los Angeles Galaxy	Club Total	3	0	0	0	0	0	0	0	3	0
Columbus Crew	2007	23	3	-	-	-	-	-	-	23	3
Columbus Crew	2008	14	0	-	-	-	-	-	-	14	0
Columbus Crew	Club Total	37	3	0	0	0	0	0	0	37	3
Los Angeles Galaxy	2009	23	0	-	-	-	-	-	-	23	0
Los Angeles Galaxy	Club Total	23	0	0	0	0	0	0	0	23	0
Philadelphia Union	2010	26	0	0	0	0	0	0	0	26	0
Philadelphia Union	2011	17	0	0	0	1	0	0	0	18	0
Philadelphia Union	Club Total	43	0	0	0	1	0	0	0	44	0
Career Total		265	13	4	0	11	0	0	0	280	13
