= Nick Zimmerman =

American soccer player (born 1987)

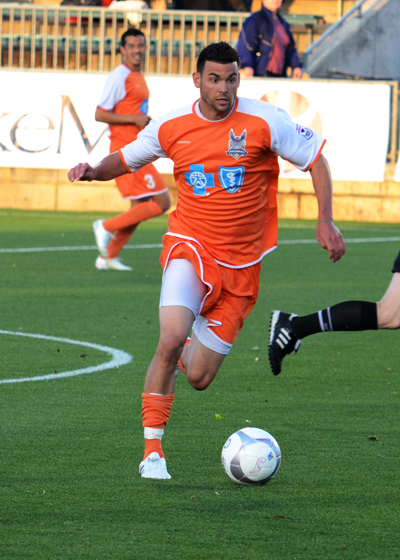

Personal information
- Full name: Nicholas Zimmerman
- Date of birth: May 3, 1987 (age 39)
- Place of birth: Tampa, Florida, United States
- Height: 6 ft 0 in (1.83 m)
- Positions: Winger; forward

College career
| Years | Team | Apps | (Gls) |
| 2005–2008 | James Madison Dukes | | |

Senior career*
| Years | Team | Apps | (Gls) |
| 2009 | New York Red Bulls | 11 | (0) |
| 2009 | → Crystal Palace Baltimore (loan) | 2 | (0) |
| 2010 | Philadelphia Union | 8 | (0) |
| 2010 | → Harrisburg City Islanders (loan) | 2 | (2) |
| 2011–2014 | Carolina RailHawks | 60 | (21) |
| 2015 | Wilmington Hammerheads | 14 | (3) |

Managerial career
- 2015–2018: Columbus State (assistant)
- 2019–2024: Mississippi State (assistant)
- 2025: Mississippi State
- 2026–: Florida
- * Club domestic league appearances and goals

Nick Zimmerman (born May 3, 1987) is an American former soccer player and currently the head coach of the Florida Gators women's soccer team.

== Career ==
=== College and amateur ===
Zimmerman played college soccer for James Madison University from 2005 to 2008. In his four years with James Madison, he appeared in 75 matches scoring 13 goals. He was primarily used as a central midfielder. In 2007, he also played club soccer for a top Florida youth club, HC United. He also played for Brandon Flames and Temple Terrace Spirit.

=== Professional ===
Zimmerman was drafted in the third round (44th overall) of the 2009 MLS SuperDraft by New York Red Bulls. His play in pre-season earned him a contract with the Major League Soccer club. He made his debut for the team on 20 March 2009 in a friendly against Portland Timbers which ended in a scoreless draw.

Zimmerman was briefly sent on loan to Crystal Palace Baltimore in the USL Second Division in May 2009. He made his professional debut for Palace on May 15, 2009, in a 1–0 win against Western Mass Pioneers, and made his MLS debut for New York on June 4, 2009, as a second-half substitute in a 2–0 defeat to D.C. United.

Zimmerman was selected by Philadelphia Union in the 2009 MLS Expansion Draft on November 25, 2009. He also spent time on loan with Harrisburg City Islanders in the USL Second Division. He was waived by Philadelphia on March 1, 2011.

He signed with Carolina RailHawks FC of the North American Soccer League in April 2011. In December 2011, Carolina re-signed Zimmerman for the 2012 season. Zimmerman scored 15 goals for the Railhawks in 2012 and was named to the 2012 NASL Best XI.

After an injury-ravaged 2014, Zimmerman left Carolina and signed with United Soccer League club Wilmington Hammerheads on March 12, 2015.

=== International ===
In 2001 Zimmerman played for the United States Under-15 national team.

== Coaching career ==
Nick Zimmerman began his coaching career in 2015 as an assistant coach for the women's soccer program at Columbus State University, an NCAA Division II institution in Columbus, Georgia, where he served under head coach Jay Entlich until 2018.

In January 2019, Zimmerman was hired as an assistant coach at Mississippi State University. He was promoted to associate head coach on January 20, 2022. During his tenure at Mississippi State from 2019 to 2024 (as assistant and associate head coach), the program made four consecutive NCAA Tournament appearances (2021–2024) and six Southeastern Conference (SEC) Tournament appearances.

Zimmerman was named head coach of the Mississippi State women's soccer program on December 3, 2024, following the departure of previous head coach James Armstrong to Auburn University. In his only season as head coach (2025), Mississippi State compiled a 12–7–1 overall record and a 5–4–1 SEC record.

On December 5, 2025, Zimmerman was appointed head coach of the Florida Gators women's soccer program at the University of Florida, becoming the fourth head coach in program history.

== Career statistics ==
Updated 17 August 2011

All-time career performance
| Club | Season | MLS | | U.S. Open Cup | | MLS Cup | | CONCACAF | | Total |
| Club | Season | App | Goals | App | Goals | App | Goals | App | Goals | App | Goals |
|---|---|---|---|---|---|---|---|---|---|---|---|
| New York Red Bulls | 2009 | 11 | 0 | 1 | 0 | - | - | | | 12 | 0 |
| Philadelphia Union | 2010 | 8 | 0 | 1 | 0 | - | - | | | 9 | 0 |
| MLS Total | | 19 | 0 | 2 | 0 | – | - | | | 21 | 0 |
| Club | Season | NASL | | U.S. Open Cup | | MLS Cup | | CONCACAF | | Total |
| Club | Season | App | Goals | App | Goals | App | Goals | App | Goals | App | Goals |
| Carolina RailHawks | 2011 | 19 | 6 | - | - | - | - | | | 19 | 6 |
| NASL Total | | 19 | 6 | 0 | 0 | – | - | | | 40 | 6 |

== Collegiate coaching record ==
Record table
| Season | Team | Overall | Conference | Standing | Postseason |
|---|---|---|---|---|---|
Mississippi State Bulldogs (SEC) (2025–2025)
| 2025 | Mississippi State | 12–7–1 | 5–4–1 | T-7th | NCAA first round |
| Mississippi State: | | 12–7–1 (.625) | 5–4–1 (.550) | | |
Florida Gators (SEC) (2026–Present)
| 2026 | Florida | 6–6–5 | 2–4–4 | T–11th | |
| Florida: | | 6–6–5 (.500) | 2–4–4 (.400) | | |
| Total: | | 18–13–6 (.568) | | | |
National champion Postseason invitational champion Conference regular season champion Conference regular season and conference tournament champion Division regular season champion Division regular season and conference tournament champion Conference tournament champion

== Other ==
Zimmerman holds a United States Soccer Federation "B" License and has served as an instructor for U.S. Soccer Federation coaching courses.
