= 2009 MLS expansion draft =

Player draft for MLS teams

2009 MLS Expansion Draft

General information
- Date: November 25, 2009

Overview
- Expansion team: Philadelphia Union
- Expansion season: 2010

The 2009 MLS Expansion Draft took place on November 25, 2009, and was a special draft for the Major League Soccer expansion team Philadelphia Union.

== Format ==
- Only 1 player may be selected from each team. Five of the league's 15 current teams will not have a player selected.
- Teams will be allowed to protect 11 players from their 28-man rosters. Generation Adidas players are automatically protected, though players who are graduated from the program to the senior roster at the end of the 2009 season are not.
- Teams with 4 or more international players must protect 3 of them. If a team has 3 or fewer international players, then it must protect all but one.
- Any developmental players selected must be moved up to the senior roster for the 2010 season.

== Expansion Draft results ==
| # | Player | Position | Country | Previous club |
|---|---|---|---|---|
| 1 | Jordan Harvey | D | United States | Colorado Rapids |
| 2 | Andrew Jacobson | M | United States | D.C. United |
| 3 | Brad Knighton | GK | United States | New England Revolution |
| 4 | Sébastien Le Toux | F | France | Seattle Sounders FC |
| 5 | Stefani Miglioranzi | M | Brazil | Los Angeles Galaxy |
| 6 | Alejandro Moreno | F | Venezuela | Columbus Crew |
| 7 | David Myrie | D | Costa Rica | Chicago Fire |
| 8 | Shea Salinas | M | United States | San Jose Earthquakes |
| 9 | Shavar Thomas | D | Jamaica | Chivas USA |
| 10 | Nick Zimmerman | M | United States | New York Red Bulls |

== Team-by-team breakdown ==
=== Chicago Fire ===
| Exposed | Protected | Exempt |
|---|---|---|
| Mike Banner | C. J. Brown | Baggio Husidić |
| Cuauhtémoc Blanco | Jon Busch | |
| Calen Carr | Wilman Conde | |
| Stefan Dimitrov | Justin Mapp | |
| Andrew Dykstra | Brian McBride | |
| Peter Lowry | Patrick Nyarko | |
| David Myrie | Marco Pappa | |
| Chris Rolfe | Logan Pause | |
| Gonzalo Segares | Dasan Robinson | |
| Austin Washington | John Thorrington | |
| Daniel Woolard | Tim Ward | |

=== Chivas USA ===
| Exposed | Protected | Exempt |
|---|---|---|
| Chukwudi Chijindu | Jonathan Bornstein | César Zamora |
| Jon Conway | Justin Braun | |
| Jim Curtin | Yamith Cuesta | |
| Kevin Harmse | Jorge Flores | |
| Ante Jazić | Maykel Galindo | |
| Dan Kennedy | Sacha Kljestan | |
| Eduardo Lillingston | Michael Lahoud | |
| Jesse Marsch | Paulo Nagamura | |
| Gerson Mayen | Jesús Padilla | |
| Lance Parker | Maicon Santos | |
| Ante Razov | Zach Thornton | |
| Marcelo Saragosa | | |
| Bojan Stepanović | | |
| Claudio Suárez | | |
| Carey Talley | | |
| Shavar Thomas | | |
| Mariano Trujillo | | |
| Sasha Victorine | | |

=== Colorado Rapids ===
| Exposed | Protected | Exempt |
|---|---|---|
| Mehdi Ballouchy | Julien Baudet | Ciaran O'Brien |
| Preston Burpo | Conor Casey | Rob Valentino |
| Steward Ceus | Colin Clark | |
| Greg Dalby | Omar Cummings | |
| Facundo Diz | Cory Gibbs | |
| Ty Harden | Kosuke Kimura | |
| Jordan Harvey | Nick LaBrocca | |
| Michael Holody | Pablo Mastroeni | |
| Pat Noonan | Drew Moor | |
| Scott Palguta | Matt Pickens | |
| Jacob Peterson | Jamie Smith | |
| Ross Schunk | | |

=== Columbus Crew ===
| Exposed | Protected | Exempt |
|---|---|---|
| Kevin Burns | Guillermo Barros Schelotto | Jed Zayner |
| Cory Elenio | Eric Brunner | |
| Jason Garey | Brian Carroll | |
| Alex Grendi | Emmanuel Ekpo | |
| Andy Gruenebaum | Eddie Gaven | |
| Frankie Hejduk | William Hesmer | |
| Andy Iro | Steven Lenhart | |
| Alejandro Moreno | Chad Marshall | |
| Gino Padula | Adam Moffat | |
| Duncan Oughton | Danny O'Rourke | |
| Emilio Rentería | Robbie Rogers | |
| Kenny Schoeni | | |

=== DC United ===
| Exposed | Protected | Exempt |
|---|---|---|
| Ely Allen | Marc Burch | Bill Hamid |
| Brandon Barklage | Fred | |
| John DiRaimondo | Dejan Jakovic | |
| Luciano Emilio | Julius James | |
| Christian Gómez | Jaime Moreno | |
| David Habarugira | Bryan Namoff | |
| Andrew Jacobson | Chris Pontius | |
| Greg Janicki | Santino Quaranta | |
| Avery John | Clyde Simms | |
| Thabiso Khumalo | Danny Szetela | |
| Miloš Kočić | Rodney Wallace | |
| Devon McTavish | | |
| Ange N'Silu | | |
| Ty Shipalane | | |
| Lawson Vaughn | | |
| Josh Wicks | | |

=== FC Dallas ===
| Exposed | Protected | Exempt |
|---|---|---|
| Ray Burse | Jair Benítez | Eric Avila |
| Pablo Ricchetti | Marvin Chávez | Bruno Guarda |
| André Rocha | Jeff Cunningham | Josh Lambo |
| Steve Purdy | Kyle Davies | Bryan Leyva |
| Darío Sala | David Ferreira | Perica Marošević |
| Daniel Torres | Atiba Harris | Brek Shea |
| Dave van den Bergh | Daniel Hernández | |
| Blake Wagner | Ugo Ihemelu | |
| Anthony Wallace | George John | |
| | Dax McCarty | |
| | Heath Pearce | |

=== Houston Dynamo ===
| Exposed | Protected | Exempt |
|---|---|---|
| Wade Barrett | Corey Ashe | Daniel Cruz |
| Mike Chabala | Bobby Boswell | Tyler Deric |
| Ricardo Clark | Geoff Cameron | |
| Ryan Cochrane | Brian Ching | |
| John Michael Hayden | Brad Davis | |
| Luis Ángel Landín | Tally Hall | |
| Richard Mulrooney | Andrew Hainault | |
| Pat Onstad | Stuart Holden | |
| Eddie Robinson | Brian Mullan | |
| Abe Thompson | Dominic Oduro | |
| Erik Ustruck | Cam Weaver | |
| Craig Waibel | | |

=== Kansas City Wizards ===
| Exposed | Protected | Exempt |
|---|---|---|
| Matt Besler | Davy Arnaud | Roger Espinoza |
| Adam Cristman | Jimmy Conrad | Chance Myers |
| Herculez Gomez | Michael Harrington | |
| Kevin Hartman | Zoltán Hercegfalvi | |
| Santiago Hirsig | Jack Jewsbury | |
| Aaron Hohlbein | Kei Kamara | |
| Michael Kraus | Jonathan Leathers | |
| Eric Kronberg | Claudio López | |
| Matt Marquess | Kevin Souter | |
| Rauwshan McKenzie | Josh Wolff | |
| Kurt Morsink | Graham Zusi | |
| Boris Pardo | | |
| Lance Watson | | |

=== Los Angeles Galaxy ===
| Exposed | Protected | Exempt |
|---|---|---|
| Todd Dunivant | David Beckham | Tristan Bowen |
| Alecko Eskandarian | Gregg Berhalter | Israel Sesay |
| Alan Gordon | Chris Birchall | |
| Leonard Griffin | Edson Buddle | |
| Bryan Jordan | A. J. DeLaGarza | |
| Jovan Kirovski | Landon Donovan | |
| Chris Klein | Sean Franklin | |
| Eddie Lewis | Omar Gonzalez | |
| Yohance Marshall | Dema Kovalenko | |
| Stefani Miglioranzi | Mike Magee | |
| Kyle Patterson | Donovan Ricketts | |
| Tony Sanneh | | |
| Josh Saunders | | |
| Julian Valentin | | |

=== New England Revolution ===
| Exposed | Protected | Exempt |
|---|---|---|
| Chris Albright | Kevin Alston | Nico Colaluca |
| Stephane Assengue | Darrius Barnes | |
| Gabriel Badilla | Kheli Dube | |
| Mauricio Castro | Shalrie Joseph | |
| Jay Heaps | Jeff Larentowicz | |
| Amaechi Igwe | Kenny Mansally | |
| Edgaras Jankauskas | Sainey Nyassi | |
| Brad Knighton | Emmanuel Osei | |
| Pat Phelan | Steve Ralston | |
| Bobby Shuttleworth | Matt Reis | |
| Wells Thompson | Taylor Twellman | |
| Chris Tierney | | |
| Michael Videira | | |

=== New York Red Bulls ===
| Exposed | Protected | Exempt |
|---|---|---|
| Andrew Boyens | Juan Pablo Ángel | Giorgi Chirgadze |
| Danny Cepero | Danleigh Borman | |
| Walter Garcia | Bouna Coundoul | |
| Leo Krupnik | Kevin Goldthwaite | |
| Matthew Mbuta | Jeremy Hall | |
| Mike Petke | Carlos Johnson | |
| Jorge Rojas | Macoumba Kandji | |
| Luke Sassano | Carlos Mendes | |
| Siniša Ubiparipović | Ernst Öbster | |
| John Wolyniec | Dane Richards | |
| Nick Zimmerman | Seth Stammler | |

=== Real Salt Lake ===
| Exposed | Protected | Exempt |
|---|---|---|
| Jean Alexandre | Kyle Beckerman | Alex Nimo |
| Pablo Campos | Tony Beltran | |
| Raphael Cox | Nat Borchers | |
| Rachid El Khalifi | Fabián Espíndola | |
| Nelson González | Robbie Findley | |
| Ned Grabavoy | Will Johnson | |
| David Horst | Javier Morales | |
| Clint Mathis | Jámison Olave | |
| Yura Movsisyan | Nick Rimando | |
| Tino Nuñez | Chris Seitz | |
| Kyle Reynish | Chris Wingert | |
| Robbie Russell | | |
| Andy Williams | | |

=== San Jose Earthquakes ===
| Exposed | Protected | Exempt |
|---|---|---|
| Quincy Amarikwa | Arturo Alvarez | |
| Bobby Convey | Bobby Burling | |
| Simon Elliott | Joe Cannon | |
| Mike Graczyk | Ramiro Corrales | |
| Darren Huckerby | Cornell Glen | |
| Aaron Pitchkolan | Jason Hernandez | |
| António Ribeiro | Ryan Johnson | |
| Jamil Roberts | Chris Leitch | |
| Shea Salinas | André Luiz | |
| Andrew Weber | Brandon McDonald | |
| Chris Wondolowski | Ramón Sánchez | |
| Mike Zaher | | |

=== Seattle Sounders FC ===
| Exposed | Protected | Exempt |
|---|---|---|
| Terry Boss | Osvaldo Alonso | |
| Evan Brown | Brad Evans | |
| Chris Eylander | Leonardo González | |
| Michael Fucito | Jhon Kennedy Hurtado | |
| Taylor Graham | Patrick Ianni | |
| Stephen King | Nate Jaqua | |
| Sébastien Le Toux | Kasey Keller | |
| Roger Levesque | Freddie Ljungberg | |
| Lamar Neagle | Tyrone Marshall | |
| Sanna Nyassi | Fredy Montero | |
| James Riley | Steve Zakuani | |
| Zach Scott | | |
| Nathan Sturgis | | |
| Peter Vagenas | | |
| Tyson Wahl | | |

=== Toronto FC ===
| Exposed | Protected | Exempt |
|---|---|---|
| Brian Edwards | Nana Attakora | Stefan Frei |
| Gabe Gala | Chad Barrett | Fuad Ibrahim |
| Nick Garcia | Jim Brennan | |
| Ali Gerba | Sam Cronin | |
| Amado Guevara | Julian de Guzman | |
| Lesly Fellinga | Dwayne De Rosario | |
| Carl Robinson | Emmanuel Gómez | |
| Pablo Vitti | Amadou Sanyang | |
| | Adrian Serioux | |
| | O'Brian White | |
| | Marvell Wynne | |
