= Abasa Aremeyaw =

Ghanaian footballer

Personal information
- Full name: Abasa Aremeyaw
- Date of birth: 15 August 2003 (age 23)
- Place of birth: Ghana
- Height: 1.94 m (6 ft 4 in)
- Position: Centre-back

Youth career
- Žilina Africa
- 2018: Žilina

Senior career*
Years	Team	Apps	(Gls)
2021–2022	Žilina B	7	(0)
2021–2022	Žilina	4	(0)
2022	Philadelphia Union	0	(0)
2024	MŠK Žilina Africa		
2024–2025	Al-Tuhami		
2025–2026	Gulf United		
- * Club domestic league appearances and goals as of 20:00, 23 September 2022 (UTC)

Abasa Aremeyaw (born 15 August 2003) is a Ghanaian professional footballer who currently plays as a Centre-back. His primary position is centre-back, and with his height, he has an impact in set pieces in addition to possessing speed and agility.

== Club career ==
=== Early years ===
Aremeyaw began his youth career with Žilina Africa, a Ghana-based affiliate club of Žilina of the Slovak Fortuna Liga.

=== Žilina ===
Aremeyaw joined Žilina in September 2021, initially playing for the club's under-18 and under-19 youth teams. Shortly thereafter, he was promoted to Žilina B, which was playing in the Slovak second division, the 2. liga. Aremeyaw made his debut for Žilina B on 18 September 2021 in a 1–0 victory over Humenné. He played 7 games that season for Žilina's reserve side.

On 30 November 2021, Aremeyaw made his Fortuna Liga debut for Žilina as a substitute in a 2–2 draw against Senica.

Aremeyaw also made six appearances for Žilina's under-19 team that competed in the UEFA Youth League in the 2021–22 edition of the tournament. He played every minute of each match, playing a role in helping the team reach the round of 16, falling to eventual finalists Red Bull Salzburg in a penalty shoot-out.

=== Philadelphia Union ===
On 4 August 2022, Amereyaw signed for the Philadelphia Union of Major League Soccer on a contract until 31 December 2024, with a club option for an additional two years. He took up an international slot in the team's roster. He and Philadelphia mutually agreed to terminate his contract with the club on 8 February 2023.

=== Al-Tuhami ===
On 25 October 2024, Aremeyaw joined Saudi Third Division club Al-Tuhami.
