= 2025 Philadelphia Union season =

Philadelphia Union 2025 soccer season

Philadelphia Union
2025 season
- Sporting director: Ernst Tanner
- Head coach: Bradley Carnell
- Stadium: Subaru Park (Capacity: 18,500)
- MLS: Conference: 1st Overall: 1st
- MLS Cup playoffs: Conference semifinals
- U.S. Open Cup: Semifinals
- Top goalscorer: League: Tai Baribo (16); All: Tai Baribo (17)
- Average home league attendance: 18,331
Home colors	Away colors

The 2025 Philadelphia Union season was the club's sixteenth season in Major League Soccer, the top flight of American soccer. The Union was one of 16 MLS teams to play in the 2025 U.S. Open Cup instead of the 2025 Leagues Cup due to their finish in the 2024 season. During the offseason, former St. Louis City SC and New York Red Bulls manager Bradley Carnell was hired as head coach to replace Jim Curtin.

The team opened their preseason camp in Clearwater, Florida, in January 2025 and moved to the Marbella Football Center in Spain for friendlies against European teams. The Marbella camp roster included 29 players, including several from reserve team Philadelphia Union II who had yet to sign a first-team contract. The Union's regular season began on February 22, 2025, with their opening match against Orlando City SC.

The Union won their second Supporters' Shield by having the best regular season record in MLS. They secured it on October 4 with their 1–0 home win against New York City FC.

== Roster ==
As of September 9, 2025

Note: Flags indicate national team as defined under FIFA eligibility rules; some limited exceptions apply. Players may hold more than one non-FIFA nationality.

No.	Pos.	Nation	Player
2	DF	ARG	Ian Glavinovich (on loan Newell's Old Boys)
4	MF	SRB	Jovan Lukić
5	DF	NOR	Jakob Glesnes
6	MF	USA	Cavan Sullivan (HG)
7	FW	DEN	Mikael Uhre (DP)
8	MF	VEN	Jesús Bueno
9	FW	ISR	Tai Baribo
11	MF	USA	Alejandro Bedoya
14	MF	USA	Jeremy Rafanello (HG)
15	DF	CMR	Olivier Mbaizo
16	MF	USA	Ben Bender
18	GK	JAM	Andre Blake
19	MF	USA	Indiana Vassilev
20	FW	URU	Bruno Damiani
21	MF	HAI	Danley Jean Jacques

No.	Pos.	Nation	Player
24	MF	USA	Nick Pariano (HG)
25	FW	USA	Chris Donovan
26	DF	USA	Nathan Harriel (HG)
27	DF	GER	Kai Wagner
29	DF	RSA	Olwethu Makhanya
31	GK	USA	George Marks
32	FW	USA	Milan Iloski
33	MF	USA	Quinn Sullivan (HG)
35	FW	USA	Markus Anderson
39	DF	USA	Frankie Westfield (HG)
44	DF	USA	Neil Pierre (HG)
55	FW	MEX	Sal Olivas (HG)
76	GK	USA	Andrew Rick (HG)
77	FW	USA	Eddy Davis III (HG)

=== Players out on loan ===
Note: Flags indicate national team as defined under FIFA eligibility rules; some limited exceptions apply. Players may hold more than one non-FIFA nationality.

No.	Pos.	Nation	Player
1	GK	GER	Oliver Semmle (at North Carolina FC until the end of the season)
12	DF	USA	Isaiah LeFlore (at Detroit City FC until the end of the season)
17	MF	USA	CJ Olney (HG, at Lexington SC until the end of the season)
22	MF	USA	David Vazquez (HG, at San Diego FC until the end of the season)

== Transfers ==
=== In ===
Date	No.	Pos.	Player	Transferred from	Fee/notes	Source
February 4, 2025	44	DF	(United States) Neil Pierre	(United States) Philadelphia Union II	Homegrown signing	
February 5, 2025	4	MF	(Serbia) Jovan Lukić	(Serbia) Spartak Subotica	Undisclosed	
February 6, 2025	39	DF	(United States) Frankie Westfield	(United States) Philadelphia Union II	Homegrown player	
February 11, 2025	77	FW	(United States) Eddy Davis III	(United States) Philadelphia Union II	Homegrown player	
February 18, 2025	20	FW	(Uruguay) Bruno Damiani	(Uruguay) Nacional	Undisclosed	
February 20, 2025	55	FW	(Mexico) Sal Olivas	(United States) Philadelphia Union II	Homegrown player	
February 21, 2025	19	MF	(United States) Indiana Vassilev	(United States) St. Louis City SC	$400,000 2025 GAM $600,000 2026 GAM $250,000 conditional GAM	
May 9, 2025	16	MF	(United States) Ben Bender	(United States) Charlotte FC	Free	
August 5, 2025	32	FW	(United States) Milan Iloski	(Denmark) FC Nordsjælland	Undisclosed $100,000 2025 GAM + $150,000 conditional GAM to CF Montreal for waiver priority	
August 26, 2025	31	GK	(United States) George Marks			

=== Out ===
Date	No.	Pos.	Player	Transferred to	Fee/notes	Source
November 26, 2024		DF	(United States) Brandan Craig	(Canada) CF Montréal	Declined Contract Option	
November 26, 2024	2	DF	(United States) Matthew Real	(United States) Colorado Springs Switchbacks	Declined Contract Option	
November 26, 2024	3	DF	(England) Jack Elliott	(United States) Chicago Fire	Declined Contract Option	
November 26, 2024	9	FW	(United States) Samuel Adeniran	(Austria) LASK	Out of contract	
November 26, 2024	19	FW	(Argentina) Joaquín Torres		Declined Contract Option	
November 26, 2024	30	DF	(Bolivia) Jamir Berdecio	(Bolivia) Oriente Petrolero	End of Loan	
November 26, 2024	31	MF	(United States) Leon Flach	(Poland) Jagiellonia Białystok	Out of contract	
January 3, 2025		FW	(Tunisia) Anisse Saidi	(United States) San Diego FC	Homegrown player rights $50,000 2025 GAM $50,000 2026 GAM $250,000 conditional GAM	
February 3, 2025	16	MF	(United States) Jack McGlynn	(United States) Houston Dynamo	$2,100,000 additional $1,300,000 (conditional)	
February 21, 2025		GK	(United States) Francesco Montali	(United States) San Jose Earthquakes	Player rights $50,000 2026 GAM	
April 11, 2025	10	MF	(Hungary) Dániel Gazdag	(United States) Columbus Crew	$4,000,000 additional $500,000 (conditional)	
May 8, 2025		FW	(Mexico) Diego Rocio	(United States) Real Salt Lake	Homegrown Priority $50,000 2025 GAM $50,000 2026 GAM $250,000 conditional GAM	
June 28, 2025	23	FW	(Haiti) Nelson Pierre	(Canada) Whitecaps FC 2	$50,000	

=== Loan In ===
Date	No.	Pos.	Player	Loaned from	Fee/notes	Source
December 20, 2024	2	DF	(Argentina) Ian Glavinovich	(Argentina) Newell's Old Boys	Loan with option to purchase	

=== Loan Out ===
Date	No.	Pos.	Player	Transferred to	Fee/notes	Source
February 27, 2025	23	FW	(Haiti) Nelson Pierre	(Canada) Whitecaps FC 2	Loaned out until end of season	
July 11, 2025	17	MF	(United States) CJ Olney	(United States) Lexington SC	Loaned out until the end of the season	
July 28, 2025	22	MF	(United States) David Vazquez	(United States) San Diego FC	Loaned out until the end of the season $50,000 2025 GAM $50,000 2026 GAM	
August 18, 2025	1	GK	(Germany) Oliver Semmle	(United States) North Carolina FC	Loaned out until the end of the season	
August 29, 2025	12	DF	(United States) Isaiah LeFlore	(United States) Detroit City FC	Loaned out until the end of the season	

== Competitions ==
=== Friendlies ===
June 7 Friendly	Philadelphia Union	2-1	Atlas	Chester, Pennsylvania
7:30 p.m. EDT	Anderson 46'; Davis III 66'	Report	González 62'	Stadium: Subaru Park

August 2 Friendly	Philadelphia Union	2-2	Eintracht Frankfurt	Chester, Pennsylvania
5:30 p.m. EDT	Damiani 41'; Donovan 73'	Report	Burkardt 3'; Wahi 62'	Stadium: Subaru Park

=== Major League Soccer ===
==== Standings ====
===== Eastern Conference =====
MLS Eastern Conference table (2025)
Pos	Team	Pld	W	L	T	GF	GA	GD	Pts	Qualification
1	Philadelphia Union	34	20	8	6	57	35	+22	66	Qualification for round one and the CONCACAF Champions Cup round one
2	FC Cincinnati	34	20	9	5	52	40	+12	65	Qualification for round one
3	Inter Miami CF	34	19	7	8	81	55	+26	65	Qualification for round one
4	Charlotte FC	34	19	13	2	55	46	+9	59	Qualification for round one
5	New York City FC	34	17	12	5	50	44	+6	56	Qualification for round one

Source: MLS
Rules for classification: 1) points; 2) total wins; 3) total goal differential; 4) total goals scored; 5) fewer disciplinary points; 6) away goal differential; 7) away goals scored; 8) home goals differential; 9) home goals scored; 10) coin toss (2 clubs tied) or drawing of lots (≥3 clubs tied)

===== Overall =====
Overall MLS standings table (2025)
Pos	Team	Pld	W	L	T	GF	GA	GD	Pts	Qualification
1	Philadelphia Union (S)	34	20	8	6	57	35	+22	66	Qualification for the CONCACAF Champions Cup round one (Note: As 2025 MLS Supporters' Shield champions)
2	FC Cincinnati	34	20	9	5	52	40	+12	65	Qualification for the CONCACAF Champions Cup round one (Note: As highest-ranked club in 2025 MLS Supporters' Shield not already qualified)
3	Inter Miami CF (C)	34	19	7	8	81	55	+26	65	Qualification for the CONCACAF Champions Cup round of 16 (Note: As 2025 MLS Cup champions)
4	San Diego FC	34	19	9	6	64	41	+23	63	Qualification for the CONCACAF Champions Cup round one (Note: As Western Conference regular season winners)
5	Vancouver Whitecaps FC (V)	34	18	7	9	66	38	+28	63	Qualification for the CONCACAF Champions Cup round one (Note: As second highest-ranked club in 2025 MLS Supporters' Shield not already qualified)

Source: MLS
Rules for classification: 1) points; 2) total wins; 3) total goal differential; 4) total goals scored; 5) fewer disciplinary points; 6) away goal differential; 7) away goals scored; 8) home goals differential; 9) home goals scored; 10) coin toss (2 clubs tied) or drawing of lots (≥3 clubs tied)
(C) MLS Cup champions; (S) Supporters' Shield winners; (V) Canadian Championship winners

==== Match results ====
February 22 1	Orlando City SC	2–4	Philadelphia Union	Orlando, Florida
7:30 p.m. EST	Pašalić 8', 79'; Araújo (yellow card) 31'	Report	Baribo 24', 64'; Uhre (yellow card) 33', (goal) 51'; Gazdag 48'; Lukić (yellow card) 58'	Stadium: Inter&Co Stadium; Attendance: 22,689; Referee: Rubiel Vazquez

March 1 2	Philadelphia Union	4–1	FC Cincinnati	Chester, Pennsylvania
7:30 p.m. EST	Baribo 6', 30', 52'; Damiani 90+3'	Report	Evander 58'; Nwobodo (yellow card) 75'	Stadium: Subaru Park; Attendance: 18,737; Referee: Allen Chapman

March 8 3	New England Revolution	0–2	Philadelphia Union	Foxborough, Massachusetts
7:30 p.m. EST	Langoni (yellow card) 52'; Ceballos (yellow card) 90+11'	Report	Gazdag (yellow card) 44'; Baribo 76', (yellow card) 78'; Makhanya (yellow card) 90+2'; Lukić 90+7'	Stadium: Gillette Stadium; Attendance: 15,596; Referee: Fotis Bazakos

March 16 4	Philadelphia Union	1–3	Nashville SC	Chester, Pennsylvania
2:00 p.m. EDT	Lukić 33'; Wagner (yellow card) 88'; Damiani (yellow card) 90+3'; Makhanya (red card) 90+12'	Report	Surridge 15'; Qasem 44'; Yazbek (yellow card) 45+2'; Mukhtar 82' (pen.)	Stadium: Subaru Park; Attendance: 18,535; Referee: Pierre-Luc Lauziere

March 22 5	Philadelphia Union	1–0	St. Louis City SC	Chester, Pennsylvania
7:30 p.m. EDT	Glavinovich 8', (yellow card) 27'; Mbaizo (yellow card) 58'; Rick (yellow card) 81'	Report	Hiebert (yellow card) 20'; Durkin (yellow card) 26'; Löwen (yellow card) 55' (yellow-red card) 66'; Morales (yellow card) 85'	Stadium: Subaru Park; Attendance: 18,639; Referee: Ricardo Fierro

March 29 6	Inter Miami CF	2–1	Philadelphia Union	Fort Lauderdale, Florida
7:30 p.m. EDT	Cremaschi (yellow card) 21'; Taylor 23'; Messi 57'; Bright (yellow card) 76'; Falcón (yellow card) 79'; Busquets (yellow card) 90+2'; Alba (yellow card) 90+4'; Suárez (yellow card) 90+5'	Report	Baribo (yellow card) 45'; Gazdag 80'; Glesnes (yellow card) 88'	Stadium: Chase Stadium; Attendance: 20,617; Referee: Rosendo Mendoza

April 5 7	Philadelphia Union	0–0	Orlando City SC	Chester, Pennsylvania
7:30 p.m. EDT	Damiani (yellow card) 65'; Harriel (yellow card) 74'; Q. Sullivan (yellow card) 76'; Vassilev (yellow card) 90+3'	Report	Jansson (yellow card) 35'; Muriel (yellow card) 52'; Gerbet (yellow card) 58'; Thorhallsson (yellow card) 75'; Gallese (yellow card) 90+4'	Stadium: Subaru Park; Attendance: 18,127; Referee: Ismir Pekmic

April 12 8	New York City FC	1–0	Philadelphia Union	New York, New York
7:30 p.m. EDT	Martínez 55'	Report	Makhanya (yellow card) 33'; Westfield (yellow card) 90+3'	Stadium: Citi Field; Attendance: 19,897; Referee: Guido Gonzales Jr.

April 19 9	Philadelphia Union	3–0	Atlanta United FC	Chester, Pennsylvania
7:30 p.m. EDT	Glesnes (yellow card) 19'; Q. Sullivan 27'; Lukić (yellow card) 45+3' (yellow-red card) 56'; Jean Jacques 50'; Baribo 84'	Report	Latte Lath (yellow card) 68'	Stadium: Subaru Park; Attendance: 18,327; Referee: Allen Chapman

April 26 10	Philadelphia Union	3–0	D.C. United	Chester, Pennsylvania
4:30 p.m. EDT	Glesnes (yellow card) 7', (goal) 15'; Westfield (yellow card) 34'; Jean Jacques 52', (yellow card) 90+6'; Damiani 77'	Report	Rowles (yellow card) 4'; Karamoko (yellow card) 72'; Barraza (yellow card) 77'	Stadium: Subaru Park; Attendance: 18,626; Referee: Rubiel Vazquez

May 3 11	CF Montréal	1–2	Philadelphia Union	Montreal, Quebec
7:30 p.m. EDT	Herbers (yellow card) 28'; Pearce (yellow card) 36'; Vrioni 45+3'; Campbell (yellow card) 56'; Sealy (yellow card) 83'	Report	Vassilev 2'; Lukić (yellow card) 58'; Harriel (yellow card) 76'; Q. Sullivan (yellow card) 82'; Uhre 84'	Stadium: Saputo Stadium; Attendance: 17,011; Referee: Marcos de Oliveira

May 10 12	Philadelphia Union	2–2	Columbus Crew	Chester, Pennsylvania
7:30 p.m. EDT	Baribo 45'; Westfield 64'	Report	Cheberko (yellow card) 55'; Arfsten 61'; Amundsen (yellow card) 84'; Zawadzki 90+3'	Stadium: Subaru Park; Attendance: 18,667; Referee: Malik Badawi

May 14 13	Philadelphia Union	3–2	LA Galaxy	Chester, Pennsylvania
7:30 p.m. EDT	Harriel (yellow card) 6'; Glesnes 48'; Baribo 50', 90+6'	Report	Cuevas 31'; Fagúndez 37'; Ramírez (yellow card) 90+6'; Nelson (yellow card) 90+9'	Stadium: Subaru Park; Attendance: 15,539; Referee: Fotis Bazakos

May 17 14	Atlanta United FC	0–1	Philadelphia Union	Atlanta, Georgia
7:30 p.m. EDT	Abram (yellow card) 57'; Mosquera (yellow card) 90+3'	Report	Bedoya (yellow card) 21'; Damiani (yellow card) 49'; Baribo 59' (pen.); Wagner (yellow card) 89'	Stadium: Mercedes-Benz Stadium; Attendance: 40,974; Referee: Chris Penso

May 24 15	Philadelphia Union	3–3	Inter Miami CF	Chester, Pennsylvania
7:30 p.m. EDT	Q. Sullivan 7'; Vassilev (yellow card) 41'; Baribo 44', 73'; Bueno (yellow card) 75'; Glesnes (yellow card) 86'; Jean Jacques (yellow card) 90+7'	Report	Fray (yellow card) 42'; Allende 60'; Alba (yellow card) 76'; Messi 87'; Redondo (yellow card) 90+2'; Segovia 90+5'	Stadium: Subaru Park; Attendance: 19,357; Referee: Drew Fischer

May 28 16	Toronto FC	1–2	Philadelphia Union	Toronto, Ontario
7:30 p.m. EDT	Brynhildsen 75'	Report	Harriel 86'; Baribo (yellow card) 89'; Wagner 90+2'; Bedoya (yellow card) 90+7'	Stadium: BMO Field; Attendance: 14,490; Referee: Guido Gonzales Jr.

May 31 17	FC Dallas	0–0	Philadelphia Union	Frisco, Texas
8:30 p.m. EDT	Abubakar (yellow card) 31' (yellow-red card) 39'; Kaick (yellow card) 75'; Ibeagha (yellow card) 90+1'	Report	Bender (yellow card) 90+3'	Stadium: Toyota Stadium; Attendance: 11,004; Referee: Sergii Boiko

June 14 18	Philadelphia Union	2–1	Charlotte FC	Chester, Pennsylvania
7:30 p.m. EDT	Makhanya (yellow card) 33'; Bender (yellow card) 45'; Bueno 45+2'; Westfield (yellow card) 74'; Damiani (yellow card) 81'; Anderson 90+8'	Report	Vargas (yellow card) 29'; Zaha (yellow card) 33', (goal) 78'	Stadium: Subaru Park; Attendance: 18,839; Referee: Ricardo Montero

June 25 19	Chicago Fire FC	0–1	Philadelphia Union	Chicago, Illinois
8:30 p.m. EDT	Gonzalez (yellow card) 81'	Report	Damiani 9' (pen.); Lukić (yellow card) 35'; Glesnes (yellow card) 50'; Bueno (yellow card) 72'; Makyanhya (yellow card) 90'; Bedoya (yellow card) 90+2'	Stadium: Soldier Field; Attendance: 17,231; Referee: Greg Dopka

June 29 20	Columbus Crew	1–0	Philadelphia Union	Columbus, Ohio
6:00 p.m. EDT	Farsi 45+2'; Gazdag (yellow card) 50'; Habroune (yellow card) 90+1'	Report	Bedoya (yellow card) 1'; Bueno (yellow card) 32'; Lukić (yellow card) 35'; Wagner (yellow card) 65'; Olivas (yellow card) 79'; Jean Jacques (yellow card) 88'	Stadium: Lower.com Field; Attendance: 20,559; Referee: Filip Dujic

July 5 21	Nashville SC	1–0	Philadelphia Union	Nashville, Tennessee
8:30 p.m. EDT	Pérez (red card) 63'; Tagseth (yellow card) 89'; Mukhtar 90+11' (pen.)	Report	C. Sullivan (yellow card) 46'; Wagner (yellow card) 71'; Glesnes (yellow card) 73'; Bender (yellow card) 79'	Stadium: Geodis Park; Attendance: 28,896; Referee: Rubiel Vazquez

July 12 22	Philadelphia Union	2–0	New York Red Bulls	Chester, Pennsylvania
7:30 p.m. EDT	Vassilev 9'; Damiani 24'; Harriel (yellow card) 62'; Lukić (yellow card) 62'	Report	Valencia (yellow card) 83'; Gjengarr (yellow card) 90+4'	Stadium: Subaru Park; Attendance: 18,745; Referee: Marcos de Oliveira

July 16 23	Philadelphia Union	2–1	CF Montréal	Chester, Pennsylvania
7:30 p.m. EDT	Glesnes (yellow card) 21'; Baribo 37'; Q. Sullivan (yellow card) 42'; Makyanhya 50'	Report	Loturi (yellow card) 41'; Owusu 45+2'; Craig (yellow card) 72'	Stadium: Subaru Park; Attendance: 16,001; Referee: Guido Gonzales Jr.

July 19 24	Houston Dynamo FC	1–1	Philadelphia Union	Houston, Texas
8:30 p.m. EDT	Escobar (yellow card) 38'; McGlynn 45+10' (pen.); Dorsey (yellow card) 46'; Lingr (yellow card) 49'	Report	Bedoya 15'; Mbaizo (yellow card) 17'; Harriel (yellow card) 26'; Uhre (yellow card) 34'; Westfield (yellow card) 74' (red card) 90+9'	Stadium: Shell Energy Stadium; Attendance: 17,390; Referee: Rosendo Mendoza

July 26 25	Philadelphia Union	3–1	Colorado Rapids	Chester, Pennsylvania
7:30 p.m. EDT	Baribo 64', (yellow card) 85'; Uhre 89', 90+5'	Report	Navarro 37'; Mihailovic (yellow card) 60'; Cannon (yellow card) 69'; Steffen (yellow card) 79'	Stadium: Subaru Park; Attendance: 18,057; Referee: Malik Badawi

August 9 26	Philadelphia Union	1–1	Toronto FC	Chester, Pennsylvania
7:30 p.m. EDT	Vassilev 4'; Glesnes (yellow card) 29'; Wagner (yellow card) 63'; Makyanhya (yellow card) 79'	Report	Petretta (yellow card) 55'; Kerr (yellow card) 79', (goal) 90+1'; Thompson (yellow card) 90+10'	Stadium: Subaru Park; Attendance: 18,619; Referee: Tori Penso

August 16 27	New York Red Bulls	1–0	Philadelphia Union	Harrison, New Jersey
7:30 p.m. EDT	Nealis 74' (yellow card) 77'; Bogacz (yellow card) 90+6'	Report		Stadium: Sports Illustrated Stadium; Attendance: 21,425; Referee: Ismir Pekmic

August 23 28	Philadelphia Union	4–0	Chicago Fire FC	Chester, Pennsylvania
7:30 p.m. EDT	Baribo 34', (yellow card) 59'; Lukić (yellow card) 37'; Wagner 64'; Makhanya (yellow card) 66'; Jean Jacques 73'; Iloski 80'	Report	Barroso (yellow card) 38'; Oregel (yellow card) 57'	Stadium: Subaru Park; Attendance: 18,712; Referee: Rubiel Vazquez

August 30 29	FC Cincinnati	0–1	Philadelphia Union	Cincinnati, Ohio
7:30 p.m. EDT	Marczuk (yellow card) 21'; Denkey (yellow card) 90+1'	Report	Makhanya (yellow card) 21' (yellow-red card) 60'; Glesnes (yellow card) 45+4'; Damiani 49'; Harriel (yellow card) 51'; Westfield (yellow card) 85'	Stadium: TQL Stadium; Attendance: 24,462; Referee: Sergii Boiko

September 13 30	Vancouver Whitecaps FC	7–0	Philadelphia Union	Vancouver, British Columbia
9:30 p.m. EDT	Müller (yellow card) 8' (goal) 29' (pen.), 45+1' (pen.), 88'; Blackmon (yellow card) 16'; Laborda 18'; Sabbi 24', 61'; Johnson (yellow card) 74'; Elloumi 80'	Report	Iloski (yellow card) 68'; Baribo (yellow card) 75'; Lukić (yellow card) 87'	Stadium: BC Place; Attendance: 26,031; Referee: Allen Chapman

September 20 31	Philadelphia Union	1–0	New England Revolution	Chester, Pennsylvania
2:30 p.m. EDT	Damiani 70'; Baribo (yellow card) 77'	Report	Oyirwoth (yellow card) 22'; Miller (red card) 75'; Yusuf (yellow card) 62'; Chancalay (yellow card) 90+5'	Stadium: Subaru Park; Attendance: 18,920; Referee: Lorenzo Hernandez

September 27 32	D.C. United	0–6	Philadelphia Union	Washington, D.C.
7:30 p.m. EDT	Servania (yellow card) 33'; J. Stroud (yellow card) 38'	Report	Damiani 17'; Antley 34' (o.g.); Vassilev 36', 51'; Iloski 49'; Makhanya (yellow card) 57'; Uhre 62'	Stadium: Audi Field; Referee: Jair Marrufo

October 4 33	Philadelphia Union	1–0	New York City FC	Chester, Pennsylvania
7:30 p.m. EDT	Jean Jacques (yellow card) 19'; Glesnes (yellow card) 36'; Uhre 40'; Damiani (yellow card) 55'	Report	O'Toole (yellow card) 34'	Stadium: Subaru Park; Attendance: 19,176; Referee: Jon Freemon

October 18 34	Charlotte FC	2–0	Philadelphia Union	Charlotte, North Carolina
6:00 p.m. EDT	Zaha 24', (red card) 90'; Vargas 30'; Marshall-Rutty (yellow card) 89'	Report	Jean Jacques (yellow card) 32'; Uhre (yellow card) 44'; Harriel (yellow card) 71'; Damiani (yellow card) 73'	Stadium: Bank of America Stadium; Attendance: 31,191; Referee: Tori Penso

=== MLS Cup Playoffs ===
==== Round One ====
October 26 Round One	Philadelphia Union	2–2 (4–2 p)	Chicago Fire FC	Chester, Pennsylvania
5:30 p.m. EDT	Vassilev 70'; Lukić (yellow card) 74'; Iloski 75'; Glesnes (yellow card) 90+1'; Wagner (yellow card) 90+5'	Report	Waterman (yellow card) 67'; Bamba 84'; Elliott (yellow card) 89', (goal) 90+3'; Oregel (red card) 90+4'; Gutiérrez (yellow card) 90+5'	Stadium: Subaru Park; Attendance: 19,019; Referee: Sergei Boiko
	Penalties
	Uhre (penalty missed); Westfield (penalty scored); Iloski (penalty scored); Baribo (penalty scored); Bueno (penalty scored)		(penalty missed) Elliott; (penalty scored) Gutiérrez; (penalty scored) Cuypers; (penalty missed) Waterman

November 1 Round One	Chicago Fire FC	0–3	Philadelphia Union	Bridgeview, Illinois
5:30 p.m. EDT	Bamba (yellow card) 19'; D'Avilla (yellow card) 63'; Haile-Selassie (yellow card) 69'	Report	Baribo 8', 16'; Danley (yellow card) 31'; Damiani 35'; Iloski (yellow card) 40'	Stadium: SeatGeek Stadium; Attendance: 17,431; Referee: Jon Freemon
Note: Philadelphia Union won the series 2–0.

==== Conference Semifinals ====
November 23 CSFE1	Philadelphia Union	0–1	New York City FC	Chester, Pennsylvania
7:30 p.m. EST	Baribo (yellow card) 33'	Report	Moralez 27', (yellow card) 35'; Wolf (yellow card) 32'; Freese (yellow card) 77'; Raul Gustavo (yellow card) 85'	Stadium: Subaru Park; Attendance: 19,210; Referee: Guido Gonzales Jr.

=== U.S. Open Cup ===
May 7 Round of 32	Philadelphia Union (Pennsylvania)	1–1 (a.e.t.) (5–4 p)	(Indiana) Indy Eleven	Chester, Pennsylvania
7:30 p.m. EDT	Bedoya 6'; Vazquez (yellow card) 55'; Makhanya (yellow card) 88'	Report	Amoh 48'; Murphy (yellow card) 69'; Ofeimu (yellow card) 90+1'; Stanley (yellow card) 90+2'	Stadium: Subaru Park; Attendance: 8,633; Referee: Matthew Corrigan
	Penalties
	Vassilev (penalty scored); Baribo (penalty scored); Westfield (penalty scored); Rafanello (penalty scored); Lukić (penalty scored)		(penalty scored) Williams; (penalty scored) Blake; (penalty missed) Quinn; (penalty scored) Lindley; (penalty scored) Stanley

May 21 Round of 16	Philadelphia Union (Pennsylvania)	4–1	(Pennsylvania) Pittsburgh Riverhounds SC	Chester, Pennsylvania
7:30 p.m. EDT	Damiani 14' (pen.); Glesnes (yellow card) 22'; Vassilev 45+1'; Jean Jacques 54', (yellow card) 65'; Lukić 86'	Report	Biasi (yellow card) 12'; Garcia 63'	Stadium: Subaru Park; Attendance: 6,604; Referee: Natalie Simon

August 13 Quarterfinals	Philadelphia Union (Pennsylvania)	3–2	(New Jersey) New York Red Bulls	Chester, Pennsylvania
7:00 p.m. EDT	Baribo 13'; Iloski 74'; Lukić (yellow card) 75'; Makhanya 89'; C. Sullivan (yellow card) 90+6'	Report	Carmona 8', (yellow card) 59'; Duncan (yellow card) 23'; Edwards (yellow card) 25'; Choupo-Moting 71'; D. Nealis (yellow card) 88'	Stadium: Subaru Park; Referee: Joshua Encarnación
Note: Match postponed from July 9 due to severe weather.

September 16 Semifinals	Nashville SC (Tennessee)	3–1	(Pennsylvania) Philadelphia Union	Nashville, Tennessee
8:00 p.m. EDT	Surridge 36', 50', 85'; Lovitz (yellow card) 75'; Mukhtar (yellow card) 78'	Report	Damiani (yellow card) 5'; Westfield (yellow card) 21'; Makhanya (yellow card) 37'; Iloski (yellow card) 62'; Wagner (yellow card) 66'; Q. Sullivan 70'	Stadium: Geodis Park; Referee: Victor Rivas
