= Indiana Vassilev =

American soccer player (born 2001)

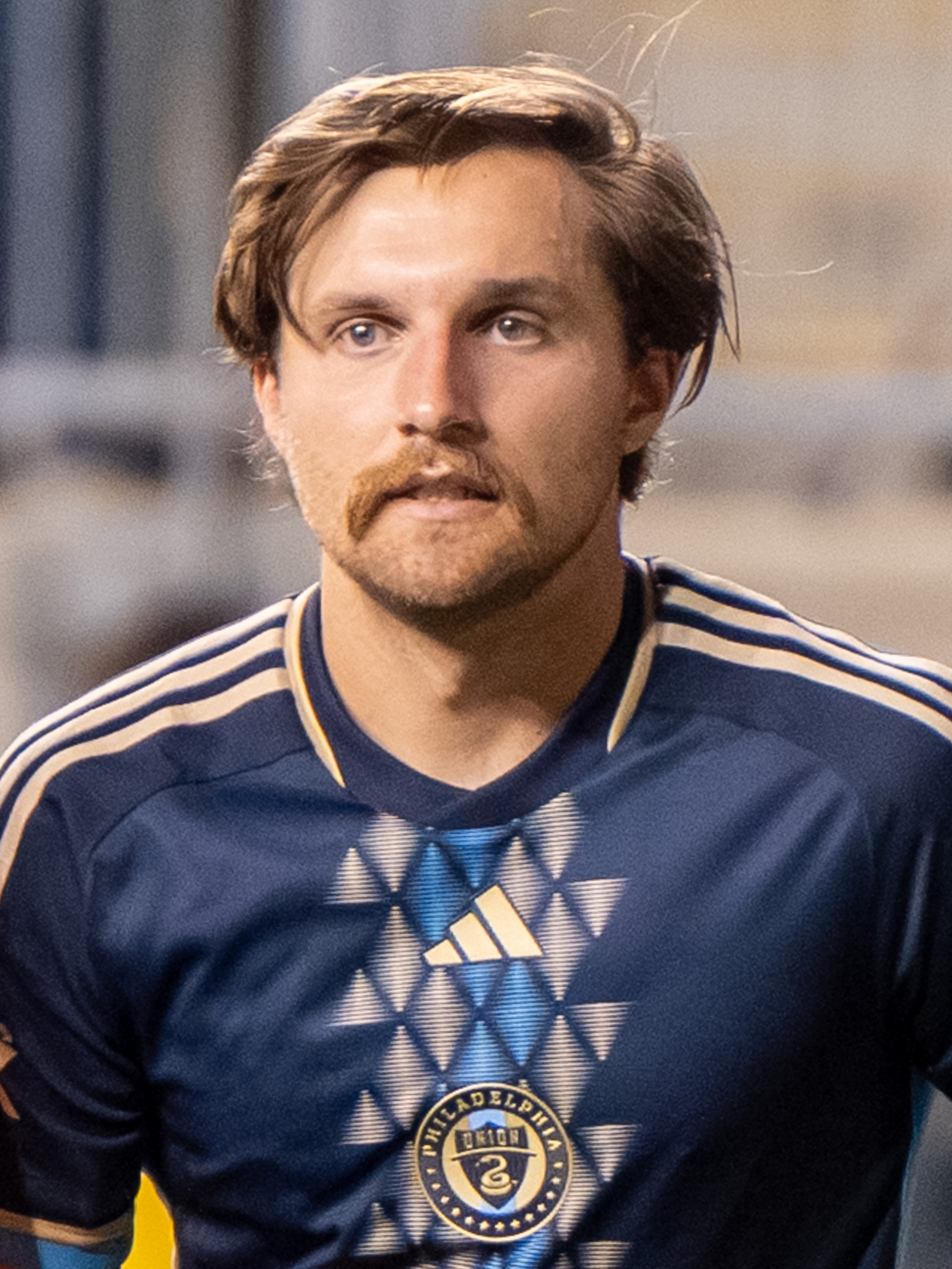
- Vassilev with the Philadelphia Union in 2025

Personal information
- Full name: Indiana Denchev Vassilev
- Date of birth: February 16, 2001 (age 25)
- Place of birth: Savannah, Georgia, United States
- Height: 5 ft 8 in (1.73 m)
- Position: Midfielder

Team information
- Current team: Philadelphia Union
- Number: 19

Youth career
- 2005–2012: Savannah United
- 2013–2015: Tormenta FC
- 2015–2018: IMG Academy
- 2018–2020: Aston Villa

Senior career*
Years	Team	Apps	(Gls)
2020–2023	Aston Villa	4	(0)
2020–2021	→ Burton Albion (loan)	12	(0)
2021	→ Cheltenham Town (loan)	12	(0)
2021	→ Inter Miami (loan)	21	(3)
2022	→ Inter Miami (loan)	24	(2)
2023–2024	St. Louis City	63	(5)
2025–	Philadelphia Union	27	(3)

International career^{‡}
2016	United States U16	8	(0)
2016–2017	United States U17	17	(3)
2018	United States U18	6	(2)
2019	United States U20	2	(0)
2023	United States U23	1	(0)
2025–	United States	2	(0)
- * Club domestic league appearances and goals as of 06:14, 18 September 2025 (UTC) ‡ National team caps and goals as of January 22, 2025

Indiana Denchev Vassilev (Bulgarian: Индиана Денчев Василев; born February 16, 2001) is an American professional soccer player who plays as a midfielder for the Philadelphia Union of Major League Soccer and the United States national team.

Vassilev is a product of Aston Villa who signed him from the IMG Academy in Florida. He has represented the United States internationally at a number of youth levels and made his senior debut in January 2025.

== Youth career ==
Vassilev started his career with Savannah United in Savannah, Georgia from 2005 to 2012. He later joined South Georgia Tormenta FC Academy (then called Tormenta United) from 2013 – 2015 before switching to IMG Academy in Florida. His coach at the IMG Academy, Kevin Hartman, described him as having great leadership qualities and all the attributes he thought were required for him to play at the top level.

== Club career ==
=== Aston Villa ===
He was first scouted by Aston Villa in November 2016 and then again while representing the United States at the 2017 U17 World Cup. He was finally offered a professional contract in 2018.

Vassilev started playing for Aston Villa's U23 team in the Premier League 2, scoring 4 goals in his first 6 games of the 2019–20 season. He was rewarded with a place in Aston Villa's first team on January 4, 2020, coming off the bench to replace Marvelous Nakamba in an FA Cup tie against Fulham. On January 18, 2020, Vassilev made his Premier League debut, coming on as a substitute in the 67th minute in a 1–1 draw away to Brighton & Hove Albion.

==== Burton Albion ====
On September 17, 2020, Vassilev signed for Burton Albion of EFL League One on a season-long loan. He made his Burton debut on September 19, in a 2–1 home victory over Accrington Stanley.

=== Cheltenham Town ===
Aston Villa recalled Vassilev from Burton Albion on January 28, 2021. The next day, January 29, he joined League Two side Cheltenham Town on loan until the end of the season. He made his Cheltenham debut on January 30, as a late substitute in a 0–0 away draw against Forest Green. He went on to make 12 appearances for Cheltenham, as they won the League Two title on May 8, 2021 – Vassilev's first trophy.

==== Inter Miami ====
On July 7, 2021, Vassilev joined MLS side Inter Miami on loan for the remainder of their 2021 season. Vassilev made his MLS debut as a substitute in a 5–0 defeat to New England Revolution on July 21, 2021. On August 8, 2021, Vassilev scored his first goal in the MLS – an injury time winner against Nashville. He started 7 of 21 games played, scoring 3 goals. Vassilev returned to Aston Villa training in November 2021, after the Inter Miami season had finished.

On May 5, 2022, Vassilev returned to Inter Miami for a second season on loan. He started 13 of 24 games played, scoring 2 goals and providing 2 assists. He made the Team of the Week on Week 16. Vassilev was out of contract following Miami's 2022 season.

=== St. Louis City ===
On November 12, 2022, Vassilev's MLS rights were acquired by St. Louis City SC as part of the 2022 MLS Expansion Draft. Inter Miami received $50,000 as part of the deal. A permanent transfer for Vassilev to St. Louis City was confirmed by Aston Villa on January 17, 2023, for an undisclosed fee.

On February 26, 2023, Vassilev made his debut for St. Louis in their first ever competitive game, a 3–2 MLS victory over Austin. He started 23 of his 29 games played during the 2023 season, scoring 2 goals and providing 5 assists. Vassilev made the MLS Team of the Matchday on Matchday 14.

In the 2024 season, Vassilev started 25 of 34 games played, scoring 3 goals and providing 4 assists.

=== Philadelphia Union ===
On February 21, 2025, Vassilev was traded to Philadelphia Union in exchange for $1 million in General Allocation Money, with an additional $250,000 depending on meeting certain performance targets. He rejoined his former St. Louis City SC manager, Bradley Carnell, at the Union.

== International career ==
Due to his parents' nationality, Vassilev was eligible to represent both the United States and Bulgaria at international level. He represented the United States at the 2017 FIFA Under-17 World Cup in which he played 4 of 5 games as the team reached the quarterfinals. He also made appearances for the United States men's national U16, U18 and U20 soccer teams.

At the beginning of 2020, Georgi Dermendzhiev, the Bulgaria national team head coach, stated that Vassilev had politely declined a call up for the Bulgaria under-21 team to continue representing the United States. In May 2023, the new Bulgaria national coach, Mladen Krstajić, reached out to Vassilev regarding a potential call-up, but was informed that the player would want to focus on his adaptation to his new club and would discuss a call-up for the next matches.

On October 8, 2023, Vassilev was called up to the United States under-23 national team ahead of friendlies against Mexico and Japan, playing in the 4–1 win over Japan.

On January 18, 2025, Vassilev made his senior national team debut in a 3–1 win over Venezuela. On January 22, 2025, he made his first senior team start in a 3–0 win over Costa Rica.

== Personal life ==
Vassilev is of Bulgarian descent. His parents settled in the United States in the early 1990s. His father, grandfather, and great-grandfather all played soccer in their native Bulgaria. His father, Dencho Vassilev, played for FC Sliven in Bulgaria and then was a NAIA All-American in 1993 at the University of Mobile and later played for the Savannah Rug Ratz in the EISL from 1997 to 1998. He is named after Indiana Jones based on his father's interest in the movie character.

His former partner, Ellie Bentley, who moved to the United States from the United Kingdom when Vassilev joined St. Louis City, was involved in a near fatal hit-and-run in St. Louis on February 25, 2024.

== Career statistics ==
=== Club ===
As of February 14, 2026

Appearances and goals by club, season, and competition
Club	Season	League			National cup (Note: Includes FA Cup and U.S. Open Cup)		League cup (Note: Includes EFL Cup and MLS Cup Playoffs)		Continental		Other		Total	
Club	Season	Division	Apps	Goals	Apps	Goals	Apps	Goals	Apps	Goals	Apps	Goals	Apps	Goals
Aston Villa	2019–20	Premier League	4	0	1	0	1	0	—		1 (Note: Appearance(s) in EFL Trophy)	0	7	0
Aston Villa	2020–21	Premier League	0	0	0	0	—		—		1	1	1	1
Aston Villa	2021–22	Premier League	0	0	0	0	0	0	—		0	0	0	0
Aston Villa	2022–23	Premier League	0	0	0	0	0	0	—		0	0	0	0
Aston Villa	Total		4	0	1	0	1	0	—		2	1	8	1
Burton Albion (loan)	2020–21	League One	12	0	—		—		—		—		12	0
Cheltenham Town (loan)	2020–21	League Two	12	0	—		—		—		—		12	0
Inter Miami (loan)	2021	MLS	21	3	—		—		—		—		21	3
Inter Miami (loan)	2022	MLS	24	2	2	0	1	0	—		—		27	2
Inter Miami (loan)	Total		45	5	2	0	1	0	—		—		48	5
St. Louis City	2023	MLS	34	2	2	0	2	0	—		2 (Note: Appearance(s) in Leagues Cup)	0	40	2
St. Louis City	2024	MLS	29	3	—		—		2 (Note: Appearances in CONCACAF Champions Cup)	0	4	1	35	4
St. Louis City	Total		63	5	2	0	2	0	2	0	6	1	75	6
Philadelphia Union	2025	MLS	34	6	—		0	0	—		4	1	38	7
Career total			170	16	5	0	4	0	2	0	12	3	193	19

=== International ===
As of match played January 22, 2025

Appearances and goals by national team and year
National team	Year	Apps	Goals
United States	2025	2	0
Total		2	0

== Honors ==
Cheltenham Town

- EFL League Two: 2020–21

St. Louis City SC

- Western Conference (regular season): 2023

Philadelphia Union

- Supporters' Shield: 2025
