= Jakob Glesnes =

Norwegian footballer (born 1994)

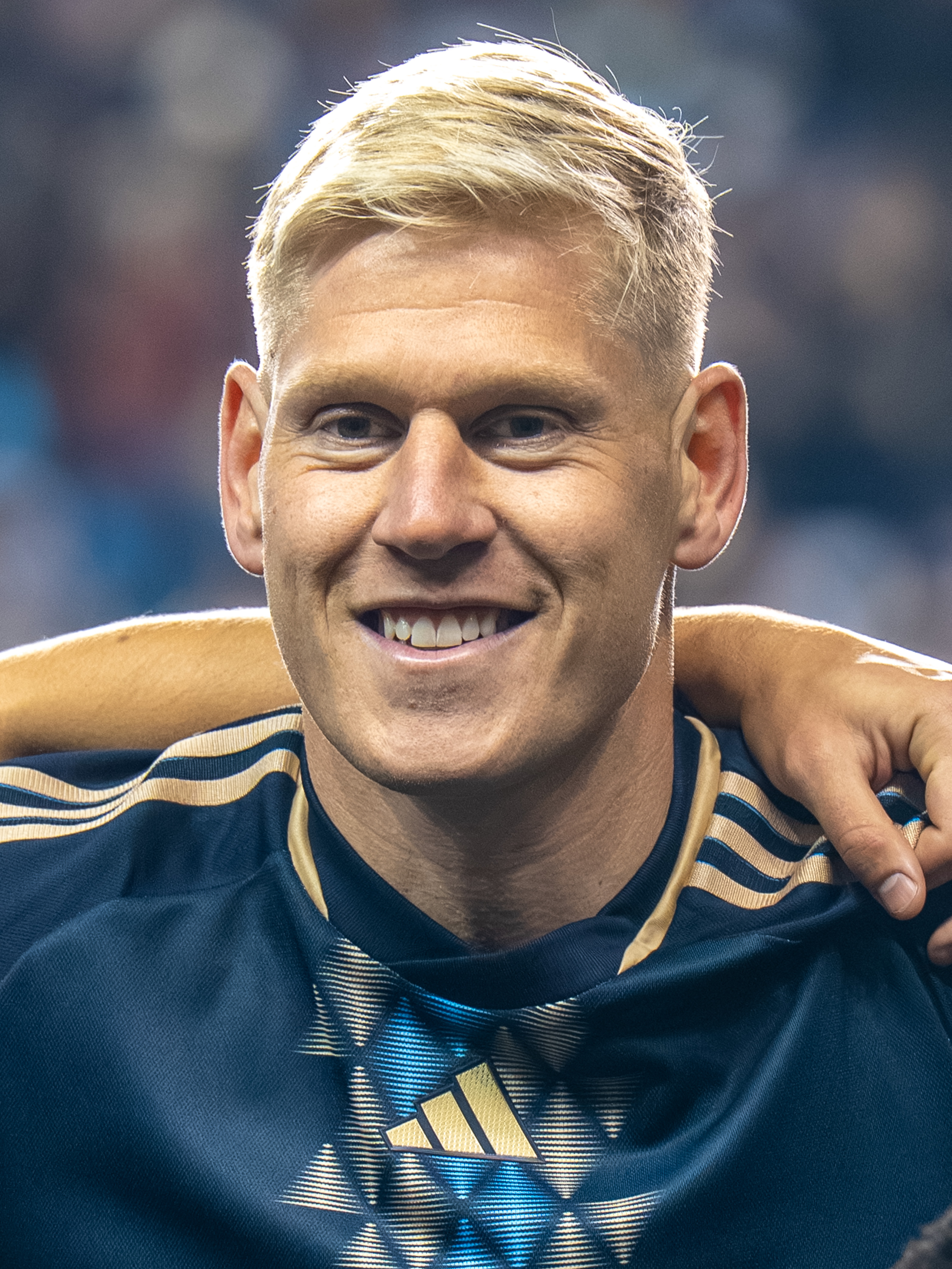
- Glesnes with Philadelphia Union in 2025

Personal information
- Date of birth: 25 March 1994 (age 32)
- Place of birth: Sotra, Norway
- Height: 1.88 m (6 ft 2 in)
- Position: Defender

Team information
- Current team: LA Galaxy
- Number: 5

Youth career
- Skogsvåg

Senior career*
Years	Team	Apps	(Gls)
2010	Hald		
2010–2015	Fyllingsdalen	83	(7)
2015–2016	Åsane	14	(0)
2016	Sarpsborg 08	14	(0)
2016–2019	Strømsgodset	98	(3)
2020–2025	Philadelphia Union	181	(9)
2026–	LA Galaxy	0	(0)

International career
2011	Norway U17	4	(0)
2016	Norway U21	3	(0)
- * Club domestic league appearances and goals as of 17:48, 16 December 2025 (UTC)

Jakob Glesnes (born 25 March 1994) is a Norwegian professional footballer who plays as a defender for the LA Galaxy of Major League Soccer.

== Club career ==
=== Early career ===
He hails from Steinsland in Sund Municipality (now part of Øygarden Municipality) and started his career in local Skogsvåg IL. In 2010, he started playing regular senior football as he transferred to Hald FK. After half a season he went on to Løv-Ham, which was soon merged to form FK Fyllingsdalen. He stayed with Fyllingsdalen until the summer of 2015, when he stepped up one tier to First Division club Åsane.

=== Sarpsborg 08 ===
Glesnes had been on trial with multiple clubs domestic and abroad, including Liverpool FC, FC København, Brann, Sogndal, Hønefoss, Lillestrøm and Nest-Sotra. In 2016, he finally joined a first-tier club, Sarpsborg 08, and made his first-tier debut in March 2016 against Haugesund.

=== Strømsgodset ===
In March 2017, Glesnes was named captain for Strømsgodset. He scored his first goal for the club on 29 May 2017.

=== Philadelphia Union ===
On 31 January 2020, Glesnes moved to the Philadelphia Union of Major League Soccer. Glesnes made headlines with his first goal for the Union, scoring a free kick from over 35 yards from goal against Los Angeles FC.

On 20 June 2021, Glesnes scored a late equalizer from well outside the 18-yard box to secure a 2–2 draw vs. Atlanta United. In the first round of the 2021 MLS Cup Playoffs on 20 November, he scored a long-distance screamer in the 123rd minute versus the New York Red Bulls to seal a 1–0 victory and send the Union to the Eastern Conference semifinals. On 8 December 2021, Glesnes signed a new, multi-year contract extension with the Union through the 2024 season.

On 19 October 2022, Glesnes won the MLS Defender of the Year Award, the first Philadelphia Union defender and first Norwegian to win the award.

=== LA Galaxy ===
On 15 December 2025, LA Galaxy acquired Glesnes for $1.1 million of general allocation money and homegrown priority for a youth player.

== International career ==
In November 2016, Glesnes played for the Norway national under-21 team for 2017 UEFA European Under-21 Championship qualification.

In October 2019, he was selected for the Norway national team for the first time.

== Career statistics ==
As of match played 23 November 2025

Appearances and goals by club, season and competition
Club	Season	League			National cup (Note: Includes Norwegian Cup, U.S. Open Cup)		Continental		Other		Total	
Club	Season	Division	Apps	Goals	Apps	Goals	Apps	Goals	Apps	Goals	Apps	Goals
Løv-Ham	2011	Adeccoligaen	16	1	1	0	—		—		17	1
Fyllingsdalen	2012	2. divisjon	11	0	0	0	—		—		11	0
Fyllingsdalen	2013	2. divisjon	21	2	2	1	—		—		23	3
Fyllingsdalen	2014	2. divisjon	24	3	3	1	—		—		27	4
Fyllingsdalen	2015	2. divisjon	11	1	3	0	—		—		14	1
Fyllingsdalen	Total		67	6	8	2	—		—		75	8
Åsane	2015	Norwegian First Division	14	0	0	0	—		—		14	0
Sarpsborg 08	2016	Tippeligaen	14	0	2	0	—		—		16	0
Strømsgodset	2016	Tippeligaen	11	0	2	0	—		—		13	0
Strømsgodset	2017	Eliteserien	28	2	3	0	—		—		31	2
Strømsgodset	2018	Eliteserien	30	1	6	0	—		—		36	1
Strømsgodset	2019	Eliteserien	29	0	3	0	—		—		32	0
Strømsgodset	Total		98	3	14	0	—		—		112	3
Philadelphia Union	2020	Major League Soccer	19	1	—		—		1 (Note: Appearances in MLS Cup playoffs)	0	20	1
Philadelphia Union	2021	Major League Soccer	34	3	1	1	6 (Note: Appearances in CONCACAF Champions Cup)	0	2 (Note: Appearances in MLS Cup playoffs)	1	43	5
Philadelphia Union	2022	Major League Soccer	34	0	1	0	—		3 (Note: Appearances in MLS Cup playoffs)	0	38	0
Philadelphia Union	2023	Major League Soccer	31	2	0	0	5	0	7 (Note: Appearances in MLS Cup playoffs)	0	43	2
Philadelphia Union	2024	Major League Soccer	32	2	0	0	4	0	—		36	2
Philadelphia Union	2025	Major League Soccer	31	1	4	0	0	0	3 (Note: Includes seven appearances in Leagues Cup and three appearances in MLS Cup playoffs)	0	38	1
Philadelphia Union	Total		181	9	6	1	15	0	16	1	218	11
LA Galaxy	2026	Major League Soccer	0	0	—		0	0	0	0	0	0
Career total			390	19	31	4	15	0	16	1	452	23

== Honours ==
Philadelphia Union

- Supporters' Shield: 2020, 2025
- MLS Cup runner-up: 2022

Individual

- MLS All-Star: 2022, 2023, 2025
- MLS Defender of the Year: 2022
- MLS Best XI: 2022, 2025
