= Olwethu Makhanya =

South African soccer player (born 2004)

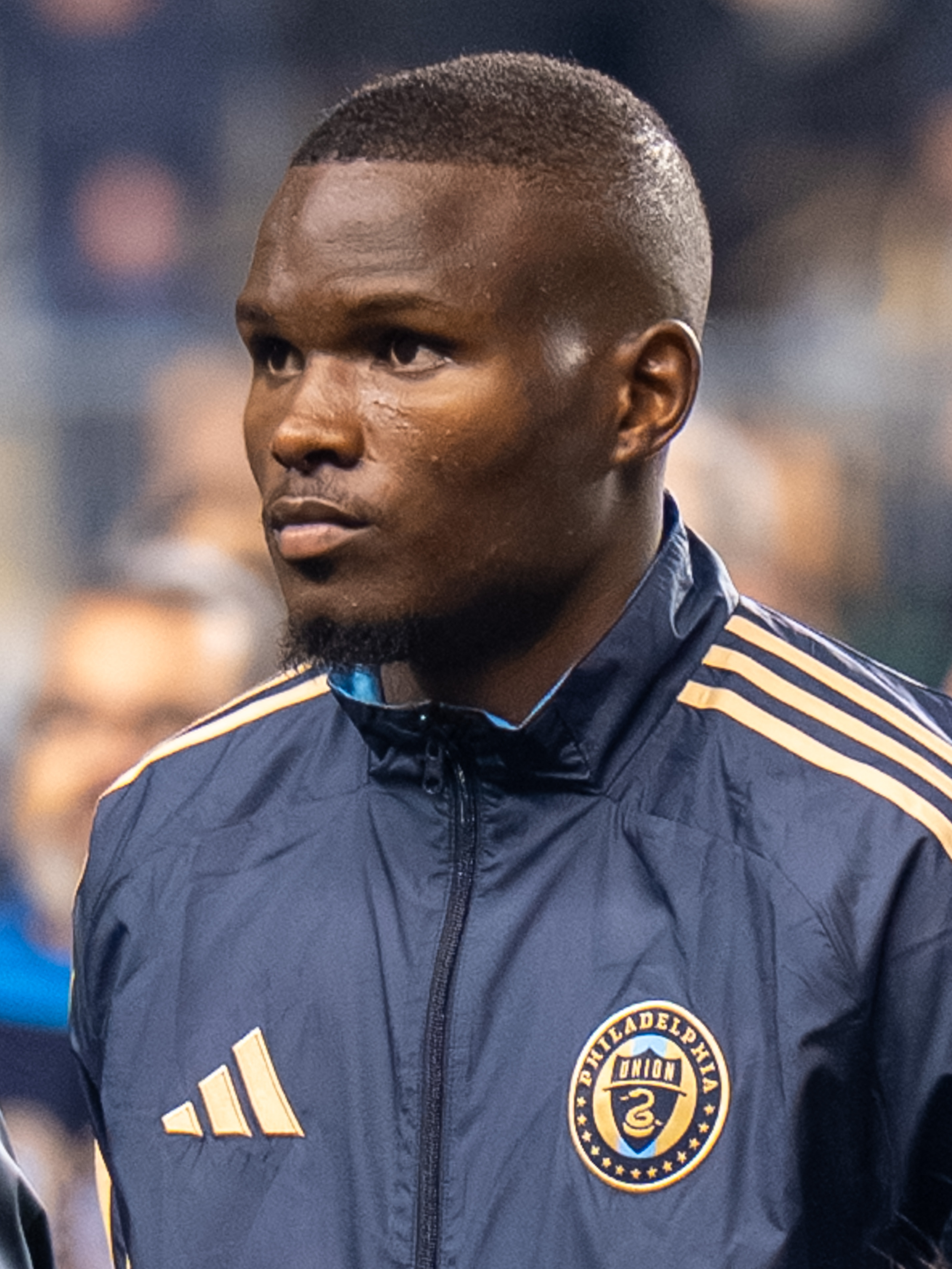
- Makhanya with the Philadelphia Union in 2025

Personal information
- Full name: Olwethu Mpilwenhle Makhanya
- Date of birth: 30 April 2004 (age 22)
- Place of birth: Durban, South Africa
- Height: 1.88 m (6 ft 2 in)
- Position: Defender

Team information
- Current team: Rangers
- Number: 24

Senior career*
Years	Team	Apps	(Gls)
2022–2023	Stellenbosch	20	(1)
2023–2026	Philadelphia Union	42	(1)
2023–2024	Philadelphia Union II	26	(1)
2026–	Rangers	5	(1)

International career
2026–	South Africa	4	(0)
- * Club domestic league appearances and goals

Olwethu Mpilwenhle Makhanya (born 30 April 2004) is a South African professional soccer player who plays as a defender for Scottish Premiership club Rangers and the South Africa national team.

== Club career ==
Makhanya started his career with South African side Stellenbosch, where he was regarded to have performed well for the club.

He was nominated for South Africa Young Footballer of the Year.

He won the 2022-23 Nedbank Cup Most Promising Player award.

In 2023, he signed for American side Philadelphia Union, becoming the club's first under-22 initiative signing.

On 30 July 2026, Makhanya signed for Scottish Premiership club Rangers on a four-year deal with the option for an additional year. Makhanya was named the SPFL Player of the Month for September 2026.

== International career ==
On 28 May 2026, he was selected by manager Hugo Broos to represent his nation at the 2026 FIFA World Cup.

== Style of play ==
Makhanya is known for his bravery. He can operate as a central defender in a back four or a back three.

== Personal life ==
Makhanya has regarded England international John Stones as one of his soccer idols. Olwethu was born in Durban South Africa.

== Career statistics ==
As of match played 20 August 2026

Appearances and goals by club, season and competition
Club	Season	League			National cup (Note: Includes Nedbank Cup, U.S. Open Cup)		League cup (Note: Includes Scottish League Cup)		Continental		Other		Total	
Club	Season	Division	Apps	Goals	Apps	Goals	Apps	Goals	Apps	Goals	Apps	Goals	Apps	Goals
Stellenbosch	2022–23	South African Premiership	20	1	3	0	—		—		—		23	1
Philadelphia Union	2025	Major League Soccer	29	1	4	1	—		—		3 (Note: Appearances in MLS Cup playoffs)	0	36	2
Philadelphia Union	2026	Major League Soccer	13	0	—		—		4 (Note: Appearances in CONCACAF Champions Cup)	1	—		17	1
Philadelphia Union	Total		42	1	4	1	—		4	1	3	0	53	3
Rangers	2026–27	Scottish Premiership	1	0	0	0	1	0	2 (Note: One appearance in UEFA Europa League, one appearance in UEFA Conference League)	0	—		4	0
Career total			63	2	7	1	1	0	6	1	3	0	80	4

== Honours ==
Philadelphia Union

- Supporters' Shield: 2025

Individual

- SPFL Player of the Month: September 2026
