= Tai Baribo =

Israeli footballer (born 1998)

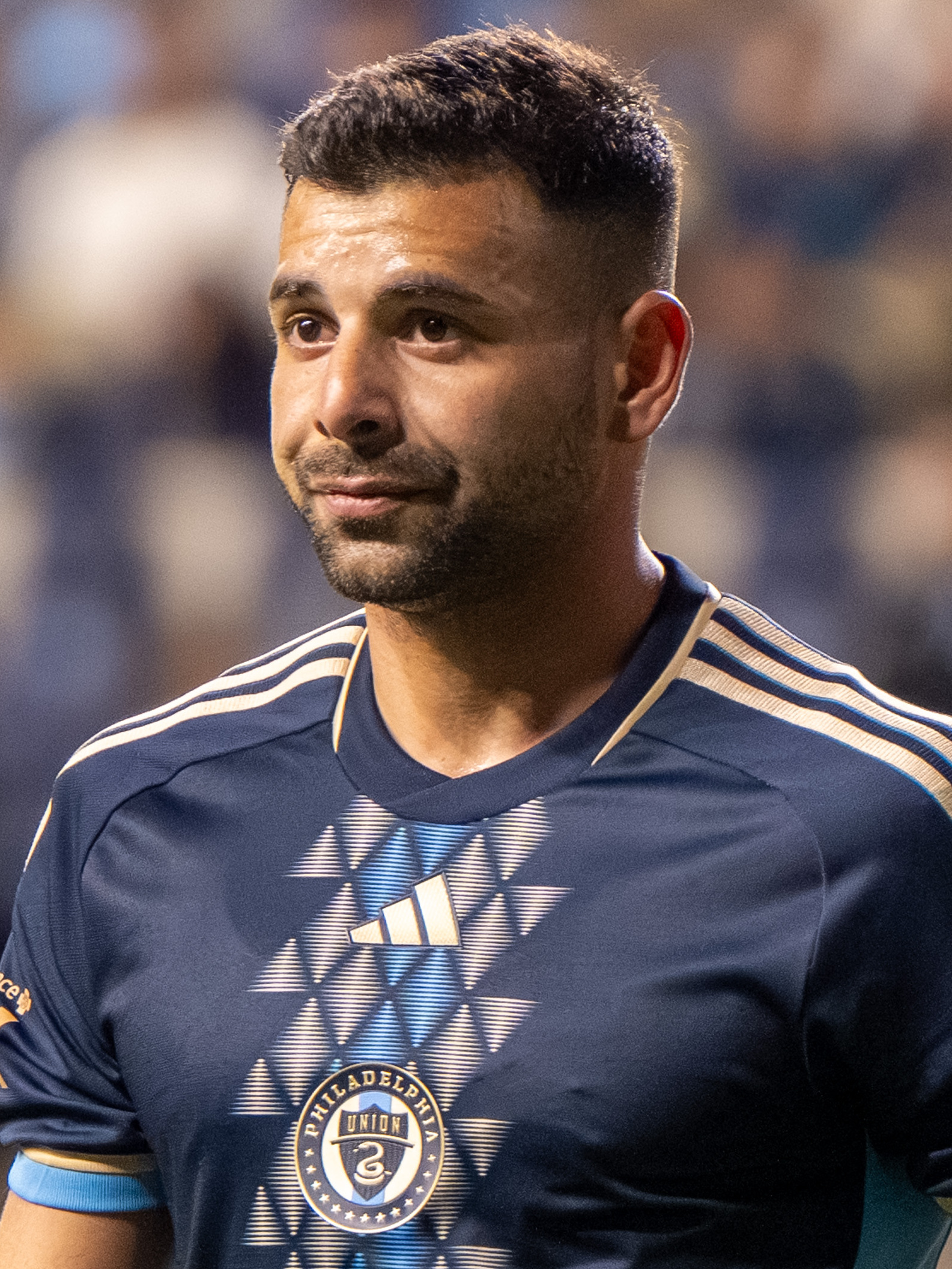
- Baribo with the Philadelphia Union in 2025

Personal information
- Date of birth: 15 January 1998 (age 28)
- Place of birth: Eilat, Israel
- Height: 1.81 m (5 ft 11 in)
- Position: Forward

Team information
- Current team: D.C. United
- Number: 9

Youth career
- 2008–2015: Hapoel Rishon LeZion
- 2015–2017: Maccabi Petah Tikva

Senior career*
Years	Team	Apps	(Gls)
2017–2021	Maccabi Petah Tikva	96	(23)
2021–2023	Wolfsberger AC	61	(27)
2023–2025	Philadelphia Union	54	(25)
2026–	D.C. United	22	(15)

International career^{‡}
2017	Israel U19	3	(1)
2018–2020	Israel U21	13	(2)
2022–	Israel	25	(4)
- * Club domestic league appearances and goals as of 00:09, 15 October 2026 (UTC) ‡ National team caps and goals as of 20:14, 1 October 2026 (UTC)

Tai Baribo (Hebrew: תאי בריבו; born 15 January 1998) is an Israeli professional footballer who plays as a forward for Major League Soccer club D.C. United and the Israel national team.

== Early life ==
Baribo was born and raised in Eilat, Israel, to an Israeli family of Sephardi Jewish descent. He explained that as an adult he has found out that the meaning of his unusual first name is a Hebrew acronym for the phrase "The Torah of the Land of Israel". His mother Maya died of cancer when he was 11 years of age, and since then Baribo has decided that his career is dedicated to the memory of her. His father Itzik owns a Water Sports Center in Eilat, Israel, where Baribo was first noticed for his talent as an 11-year-old. He is the youngest of three children.

He was enlisted in the Israel Defense Forces (IDF) as a soldier in 2016, until his honorable discharge in 2019.

He also holds a Portuguese passport on account of his Sephardi Jewish ancestry, which eases the move to certain European football leagues.

== Club career ==
=== Maccabi Petah Tikva ===
Baribo started playing football for Israeli side Hapoel Rishon LeZion. Due to the long distance, he had to get to team training on flights. When he reached the age of 15, he signed with Maccabi Petah Tikva.

On 1 March 2017, Baribo made his senior debut in a 2–1 loss against Maccabi Tel Aviv in the 2016–17 Israel State Cup.

=== Wolfsberger AC ===
Baribo signed a two-year contract with Austrian Football Bundesliga club Wolfsberger AC on 9 July 2021. He made his debut for the club on 25 July, the opening day of the 2021–22 season, coming off the bench as a late substitute for Thorsten Röcher in a 1–1 draw against Austria Klagenfurt. He scored his first goals the following month, securing a 2–2 draw against WSG Tirol by netting a brace.

=== Philadelphia Union ===
In August 2023, Philadelphia Union acquired Baribo from Wolfsberger AC for an undisclosed amount. He signed a 2.5-year contract with the club. On 18 July 2024, Baribo scored his first hat trick against New England Revolution in a 5–1 win.

Baribo scored seven goals in six games during the 2024 Leagues Cup, and as a result was awarded the golden boot for the tournament.

=== D.C. United ===
In December 2025, D.C. United acquired Baribo from Philadelphia Union for $4 million plus up to $600,000 in performance incentives. On 21 February 2026, Baribo made his United debut, scoring in a 1–0 victory against his former club.

== International career ==
Baribo made his senior debut for the Israel national team opening in a friendly 0–2 away loss to Germany on 26 March 2022.

On 24 September 2022, Baribo scored the first goal for Israel against Albania in the 2022–23 UEFA Nations League in a 2–1 home victory for Israel.

== Career statistics ==
=== Club ===
As of match played 17 September 2026

Appearances and goals by club, season and competition
Club	Season	League			National cup (Note: Includes Israel State Cup, Austrian Cup, U.S. Open Cup)		League cup (Note: Includes Toto Cup)		Continental		Other		Total	
Club	Season	Division	Apps	Goals	Apps	Goals	Apps	Goals	Apps	Goals	Apps	Goals	Apps	Goals
Maccabi Petah Tikva	2016–17	Israeli Premier League	4	0	1	0	0	0	—		—		5	0
Maccabi Petah Tikva	2017–18	Israeli Premier League	8	1	0	0	4	0	—		—		12	1
Maccabi Petah Tikva	2018–19	Israeli Premier League	31	7	3	0	4	0	—		—		38	7
Maccabi Petah Tikva	2019–20	Liga Leumit	25	9	4	1	4	1	—		—		33	11
Maccabi Petah Tikva	2020–21	Israeli Premier League	28	6	1	0	3	0	—		—		32	6
Maccabi Petah Tikva	Total		96	23	9	1	15	1	0	0	0	0	120	25
Wolfsberger AC	2021–22	Austrian Bundesliga	29	11	3	2	—		—		—		32	13
Wolfsberger AC	2022–23	Austrian Bundesliga	32	16	0	0	—		4 (Note: Appearances in UEFA Europa Conference League)	2	—		36	18
Wolfsberger AC	Total		61	27	3	2	0	0	4	2	0	0	68	31
Philadelphia Union	2023	MLS	5	0	—		—		—		1 (Note: Appearance(s) in Leagues Cup)	0	6	0
Philadelphia Union	2024	MLS	20	9	—		—		—		6	7	26	16
Philadelphia Union	2025	MLS	29	16	3	1	—		—		—		32	17
Philadelphia Union	Total		54	25	3	1	0	0	0	0	7	7	64	33
D.C. United	2026	MLS	19	14	0	0	0	0	—		—		19	14
Career total			230	89	15	4	15	1	4	2	7	7	271	103

=== International ===
As of match played 1 October 2026

Appearances and goals by national team and year
National team	Year	Apps	Goals
Israel	2022	7	3
Israel	2023	7	0
Israel	2024	4	0
Israel	2025	5	1
Israel	2026	2	0
Total		25	4

== Honours ==
Philadelphia Union

- Supporters' Shield: 2025

Individual

- Leagues Cup top scorer: 2024
- MLS All-Star Game MVP: 2025

== See also ==
- List of Jewish footballers
- List of Jews in sports
- List of Israelis
