= Ian Glavinovich =

Argentine footballer (born 2001)

Personal information
- Date of birth: 27 October 2001 (age 25)
- Position: Defender

Team information
- Current team: Newell's Old Boys

Youth career
- –2017: Peñarol de Elortondo
- 2017–2022: Newell's Old Boys

Senior career*
Years	Team	Apps	(Gls)
2022–	Newell's Old Boys	27	(0)
2025	→ Philadelphia Union (loan)	4	(1)

International career
- Argentina U23
- * Club domestic league appearances and goals as of 00:15 (UTC) 29 December 2025

Ian Glavinovich (born 27 October 2001) is an Argentine professional footballer who plays as a central defender for Argentina Primera Division club Newell's Old Boys. He is an Argentina U23 international.

== Career ==
He joined the youth system at Newell's Old Boys as a teenager in 2017. He played prior to that for Peñarol de Elortondo. He made his senior Argentina Primera Division debut for Newell's in August 2022 against Godoy Cruz de Mendoza. In the October of that year he signed his first professional contract with the club. He played 18 matches for Newell's Old Boys in 2024 and was under contract until the end of 2025, but was heavily linked with a transfer to Brazilian side Vasco de Gama in September 2024. However, that move fell through upon the end of the Brazilian transfer window.

He joined Major League Soccer club Philadelphia Union on a year-long loan in December 2024, with the option to make the transfer permanent. He scored on his first league start for the club in March 2025, against St. Louis City SC.

== Personal life ==
He is from Elortondo in Santa Fe Province. He has dual Argentine and Croatian citizenship.

== Honours ==
Philadelphia Union

- Supporters' Shield: 2025
