= 2025 Major League Soccer season =

30th season of Major League Soccer

Major League Soccer
- Season: 2025
- Dates: February 22 – October 18 (regular season); October 22 – December 6 (playoffs)
- Teams: 30
- MLS Cup: Inter Miami CF (1st title)
- Supporters' Shield: Philadelphia Union (2nd shield)
- Champions Cup (United States): FC Cincinnati; Inter Miami CF; LA Galaxy; Los Angeles FC; Nashville SC; Philadelphia Union; Seattle Sounders FC
- Champions Cup (Canada): Vancouver Whitecaps FC
- Matches: 510
- Goals: 1,530 (3 per match)
- Best player: Lionel Messi
- Top goalscorer: Lionel Messi (29 goals)
- Best goalkeeper: Yohei Takaoka (13 clean sheets)
- Biggest home win: Red Bulls 7–0 LA Galaxy (May 10); Vancouver 7–0 Philadelphia (September 13)
- Biggest away win: DC 1–7 Chicago (June 7)
- Highest scoring: 9 goals: Nashville 7–2 Chicago (April 26); Atlanta 4–5 Columbus (September 13)
- Longest winning run: 9 matches: Charlotte (July 12 – September 13)
- Longest unbeaten run: 12 matches: Orlando (March 15 – May 24); Nashville (April 26 – July 5)
- Longest winless run: 16 matches: LA Galaxy (February 23 – May 28)
- Longest losing run: 5 matches: LA Galaxy (April 19 – May 14); D.C. (July 12 – August 9); Kansas City (September 7 – October 4)
- Highest attendance: 65,520; ATL 3–2 MTL (February 22)
- Lowest attendance: 10,645; DC 1–1 NE (May 28)
- Total attendance: 11,094,594
- Average attendance: 21,754

The 2025 Major League Soccer season was the 30th season of Major League Soccer (MLS), the top professional soccer league in the United States and Canada, and the 47th season overall of a national first-division league in the United States.

MLS expanded to 30 clubs this season with the addition of San Diego FC, an expansion team awarded in 2023. The league's 30 teams were divided into the Eastern and Western conferences, which each had 15 teams. The regular season ran from February 22 to October 18 and comprised 34 matches for each team, with a schedule that was primarily intra-conference with six inter-conference matches per team. There was a break for the 2025 FIFA Club World Cup and 2025 CONCACAF Gold Cup in late June but no break for the 2025 Leagues Cup in August. The playoffs began on October 22 and concluded with MLS Cup 2025 on December 6. The San Jose Earthquakes hosted D.C. United on April 6, 2025, in a nod to the inaugural MLS match played by the same two teams, as part of recognition of the league's 30th anniversary.

All MLS games were broadcast on MLS Season Pass for the third year as part of a ten-year partnership between MLS and Apple Inc. for the broadcast and streaming rights to all MLS and Leagues Cup games, as well as select MLS Next and MLS Next Pro games.

The 2025 FIFA Club World Cup, hosted by the United States, took place during the middle of the season and included MLS participants Seattle Sounders FC, Inter Miami CF, and Los Angeles FC. The 2025 edition of the Leagues Cup took place between July 29 and August 31.

The LA Galaxy were the reigning MLS Cup champions and Inter Miami CF were the Supporters' Shield holders, having set the all-time points record during the 2024 season. The Philadelphia Union won the Supporters' Shield for a second time, while Inter Miami CF won a first MLS Cup title after defeating Vancouver Whitecaps FC 3–1 at Chase Stadium in Fort Lauderdale, Florida.

== Teams ==
=== Stadiums and locations ===
Locations of teams for the 2025 Major League Soccer season
Western Conference Eastern Conference

Team	Stadium	Capacity
Atlanta United FC	Mercedes-Benz Stadium	42,500
Austin FC	Q2 Stadium	20,738
CF Montréal	Saputo Stadium	19,619
Charlotte FC	Bank of America Stadium	38,000
Chicago Fire FC	Soldier Field	24,955
Colorado Rapids	Dick's Sporting Goods Park	18,061
Columbus Crew	Lower.com Field	20,011
D.C. United	Audi Field	20,000
FC Cincinnati	TQL Stadium	26,000
FC Dallas	Toyota Stadium	20,500
Houston Dynamo FC	Shell Energy Stadium	22,039
Inter Miami CF	Chase Stadium	21,550
LA Galaxy	Dignity Health Sports Park	27,000
Los Angeles FC	BMO Stadium	22,000
Minnesota United FC	Allianz Field	19,400
Nashville SC	Geodis Park	30,000
New England Revolution	Gillette Stadium	20,000
New York City FC	Yankee Stadium Citi Field	28,743; 41,992
New York Red Bulls	Sports Illustrated Stadium	25,000
Orlando City SC	Inter&Co Stadium	25,500
Philadelphia Union	Subaru Park	18,500
Portland Timbers	Providence Park	25,218
Real Salt Lake	America First Field	20,213
San Diego FC	Snapdragon Stadium	35,000
San Jose Earthquakes	PayPal Park	18,000
Seattle Sounders FC	Lumen Field	37,722
Sporting Kansas City	Children's Mercy Park	18,467
St. Louis City SC	Energizer Park	22,423
Toronto FC	BMO Field	28,351
Vancouver Whitecaps FC	BC Place	22,120

1. Non-soccer specific stadium and artificially reduced capacity. Capacity could be increased to full capacity if demand required.
2. Temporary stadium.

=== Personnel and sponsorships ===
Note: All teams used Adidas as universal kit manufacturer. As part of Apple's broadcast contract, all MLS kits included Apple TV+ as a sleeve sponsor.

Team	Head coach	Captain	Shirt sponsor	Sleeve sponsor
Atlanta United FC	(Norway) Ronny Deila	(United States) Brad Guzan	American Family Insurance	Emory Healthcare
Austin FC	(Spain) Nico Estévez	(Spain) Ilie Sánchez	Yeti	Siete Foods
Charlotte FC	(England) Dean Smith	(England) Ashley Westwood	Ally	Rugs.com
Chicago Fire FC	(United States) Gregg Berhalter	(United States) Kellyn Acosta	Carvana	Magellan Corporation
FC Cincinnati	(United States) Pat Noonan	(United States) Miles Robinson	Mercy Health	Kroger
Colorado Rapids	(United States) Chris Armas	(United States) Keegan Rosenberry	UCHealth	Kiewit
Columbus Crew	(France) Wilfried Nancy	(United States) Darlington Nagbe	Nationwide	DHL Supply Chain
FC Dallas	(United States) Eric Quill	(Indonesia) Maarten Paes	Children's Health (Home) UT Southwestern (Away)	—
D.C. United	(Switzerland) René Weiler	(Belgium) Christian Benteke	Guidehouse	Fruitist
Houston Dynamo FC	(United States) Ben Olsen	(Brazil) Artur	MD Anderson	—
Inter Miami CF	(Argentina) Javier Mascherano	(Argentina) Lionel Messi	Royal Caribbean	Fracht Group
LA Galaxy	(United States) Greg Vanney	(Japan) Maya Yoshida	Herbalife	RBC
Los Angeles FC	(United States) Steve Cherundolo	(United States) Aaron Long	BMO Bank (Note: Rockstar sponsored training and special event jerseys)	Ford
Minnesota United FC	(Wales) Eric Ramsay	(New Zealand) Michael Boxall	Target (Note: Blue Cross and Blue Shield of Minnesota sponsored training and special event jerseys)	NutriSource
CF Montréal	(Italy) Marco Donadel (interim)	(Canada) Samuel Piette	Bank of Montreal	Telus
Nashville SC	(United States) B.J. Callaghan	(United States) Walker Zimmerman	Renasant Bank (Note: Vanderbilt Health sponsored training and special event jerseys)	Hyundai
New England Revolution	(Uruguay) Pablo Moreira (interim)	(Spain) Carles Gil	Gillette	—
New York City FC	(Netherlands) Pascal Jansen	(Brazil) Thiago Martins	Etihad Airways (Note: Montefiore Einstein sponsored training and special event jerseys)	Judi Health
New York Red Bulls	(Germany) Sandro Schwarz	(Sweden) Emil Forsberg	Red Bull	OANDA
Orlando City SC	(Colombia) Óscar Pareja	(Sweden) Robin Jansson	Orlando Health	Exploria
Philadelphia Union	(South Africa) Bradley Carnell	(United States) Alejandro Bedoya	Bimbo Bakeries USA	Independence Blue Cross
Portland Timbers	(England) Phil Neville	(Colombia) Diego Chará	Tillamook (Note: Dutch Bros. Coffee sponsored training and special event jerseys)	—
Real Salt Lake	(United States) Pablo Mastroeni	(Brazil) Rafael Cabral	Select Health	Intermountain Health
San Diego FC	(United States) Mikey Varas	(Denmark) Jeppe Tverskov	DirecTV	Adriana's Insurance
San Jose Earthquakes	(United States) Bruce Arena	(Argentina) Cristian Espinoza	El Camino Health	Habbas Law
Seattle Sounders FC	(United States) Brian Schmetzer	(Switzerland) Stefan Frei	Providence (Note: Providence Swedish sponsored training and special event jerseys)	Emerald Queen Casino
Sporting Kansas City	(United States) Kerry Zavagnin (interim)	(Germany) Erik Thommy	Compass Minerals	—
St. Louis City SC	(United States) David Critchley (interim)	(Switzerland) Roman Bürki	Purina	BJC HealthCare
Toronto FC	(United States) Robin Fraser	(Canada) Jonathan Osorio	Bank of Montreal	LG
Vancouver Whitecaps FC	(Denmark) Jesper Sørensen	(Scotland) Ryan Gauld	Telus	BLG

=== Coaching changes ===
Team	Outgoing coach	Manner of departure	Date of vacancy	Position in table	Incoming coach	Date of appointment
Austin FC	(United States) Davy Arnaud (interim)	End of interim period	October 25, 2024	Pre-season	(Spain) Nico Estévez	October 25, 2024
Philadelphia Union	(United States) Jim Curtin	Mutual consent	November 7, 2024	Pre-season	(South Africa) Bradley Carnell	January 2, 2025
San Jose Earthquakes	(United States) Ian Russell (interim)	End of interim period	November 7, 2024	Pre-season	(United States) Bruce Arena	November 7, 2024
FC Dallas	(France) Peter Luccin (interim)	End of interim period	November 20, 2024	Pre-season	(United States) Eric Quill	November 20, 2024
Inter Miami CF	(Argentina) Gerardo Martino	Resigned	November 22, 2024	Pre-season	(Argentina) Javier Mascherano	November 26, 2024
Vancouver Whitecaps FC	(Italy) Vanni Sartini	Mutual consent	November 25, 2024	Pre-season	(Denmark) Jesper Sørensen	January 14, 2025
Atlanta United FC	(United States) Rob Valentino (interim)	End of interim period	November 26, 2024	Pre-season	(Norway) Ronny Deila	December 20, 2024
New York City FC	(England) Nick Cushing	Fired	November 26, 2024	Pre-season	(Netherlands) Pascal Jansen	January 6, 2025
St. Louis City SC	(United States) John Hackworth (interim)	End of interim period	November 26, 2024	Pre-season	(Sweden) Olof Mellberg	November 26, 2024
Toronto FC	(England) John Herdman	Resigned	November 29, 2024	Pre-season	(United States) Robin Fraser	January 10, 2025
CF Montréal	(France) Laurent Courtois	Fired	March 24, 2025	15th in East, 30th overall	(Italy) Marco Donadel (interim)	March 24, 2025
Sporting Kansas City	(United States) Peter Vermes	Mutual consent	March 31, 2025	15th in West, 30th overall	(United States) Kerry Zavagnin (interim)	March 31, 2025
St. Louis City SC	(Sweden) Olof Mellberg	Fired	May 27, 2025	14th in West, 28th overall	(England) David Critchley (interim)	May 27, 2025
D.C. United	(United States) Troy Lesesne	Fired	July 10, 2025	12th in East, 25th overall	(United States) Kevin Flanagan (interim)	July 10, 2025
D.C. United	(United States) Kevin Flanagan (interim)	End of interim period	July 16, 2025	14th in East, 27th overall	(Switzerland) René Weiler	July 16, 2025
New England Revolution	(United States) Caleb Porter	Fired	September 15, 2025	11th in East, 23rd overall	(Uruguay) Pablo Moreira (interim)	September 15, 2025

== Regular season ==
=== Format ===
The MLS regular season began on February 22 and ended on October 18 with "Decision Day". Each team played 34 matches – 17 at home and 17 away – primarily against opponents from the same conference. The schedule included two matches against opponents in the same conference, comprising a total of 28 matches, and six matches against opponents from the other conference. The regular season included breaks for the FIFA Club World Cup and CONCACAF Gold Cup from June 15 to 24. MLS did not include a break in regular season play for the month-long Leagues Cup, which began in late July. The MLS Cup playoffs began on October 22 and comprised nine teams from each conference over five rounds in a variety of formats, beginning with a single match for the lowest-seeded wild card teams. The next round was a best-of-three round, which was then followed by single-elimination matches hosted by the team with the better regular season record. MLS Cup 2025 was played on December 6.

=== Conference standings ===
MLS Eastern Conference table (2025)
Pos	Team	Pld	W	L	T	GF	GA	GD	Pts	Qualification
1	Philadelphia Union	34	20	8	6	57	35	+22	66	Qualification for round one and the CONCACAF Champions Cup round one
2	FC Cincinnati	34	20	9	5	52	40	+12	65	Qualification for round one
3	Inter Miami CF (C)	34	19	7	8	81	55	+26	65	Qualification for round one
4	Charlotte FC	34	19	13	2	55	46	+9	59	Qualification for round one
5	New York City FC	34	17	12	5	50	44	+6	56	Qualification for round one
6	Nashville SC	34	16	12	6	58	45	+13	54	Qualification for round one
7	Columbus Crew	34	14	8	12	55	51	+4	54	Qualification for round one
8	Chicago Fire FC	34	15	11	8	68	60	+8	53	Qualification for the wild card round
9	Orlando City SC	34	14	9	11	63	51	+12	53	Qualification for the wild card round
10	New York Red Bulls	34	12	15	7	48	47	+1	43	
11	New England Revolution	34	9	16	9	44	51	−7	36	
12	Toronto FC	34	6	14	14	37	44	−7	32	
13	CF Montréal	34	6	18	10	34	60	−26	28	
14	Atlanta United FC	34	5	16	13	38	63	−25	28	
15	D.C. United	34	5	18	11	30	66	−36	26	

Source: MLS
Rules for classification: 1) points; 2) total wins; 3) total goal differential; 4) total goals scored; 5) fewer disciplinary points; 6) away goal differential; 7) away goals scored; 8) home goals differential; 9) home goals scored; 10) coin toss (2 clubs tied) or drawing of lots (≥3 clubs tied)
(C) MLS Cup champions

MLS Western Conference table (2025)
Pos	Team	Pld	W	L	T	GF	GA	GD	Pts	Qualification
1	San Diego FC	34	19	9	6	64	41	+23	63	Qualification for round one and the CONCACAF Champions Cup round one
2	Vancouver Whitecaps FC	34	18	7	9	66	38	+28	63	Qualification for round one
3	Los Angeles FC	34	17	8	9	65	40	+25	60	Qualification for round one
4	Minnesota United FC	34	16	8	10	56	39	+17	58	Qualification for round one
5	Seattle Sounders FC	34	15	9	10	58	48	+10	55	Qualification for round one
6	Austin FC	34	13	13	8	37	45	−8	47	Qualification for round one
7	FC Dallas	34	11	12	11	52	55	−3	44	Qualification for round one
8	Portland Timbers	34	11	12	11	41	48	−7	44	Qualification for the wild card round
9	Real Salt Lake	34	12	17	5	38	49	−11	41	Qualification for the wild card round
10	San Jose Earthquakes	34	11	15	8	60	63	−3	41	
11	Colorado Rapids	34	11	15	8	44	56	−12	41	
12	Houston Dynamo FC	34	9	15	10	43	56	−13	37	
13	St. Louis City SC	34	8	18	8	44	58	−14	32	
14	LA Galaxy	34	7	18	9	46	66	−20	30	
15	Sporting Kansas City	34	7	20	7	46	70	−24	28	

Source: MLS
Rules for classification: 1) points; 2) total wins; 3) total goal differential; 4) total goals scored; 5) fewer disciplinary points; 6) away goal differential; 7) away goals scored; 8) home goals differential; 9) home goals scored; 10) coin toss (2 clubs tied) or drawing of lots (≥3 clubs tied)

=== Overall table ===
The leading team in this table won the Supporters' Shield.

Overall MLS standings table (2025)
Pos	Team	Pld	W	L	T	GF	GA	GD	Pts	Qualification
1	Philadelphia Union (S)	34	20	8	6	57	35	+22	66	Qualification for the CONCACAF Champions Cup round one (Note: As 2025 MLS Supporters' Shield champions)
2	FC Cincinnati	34	20	9	5	52	40	+12	65	Qualification for the CONCACAF Champions Cup round one (Note: As highest-ranked club in 2025 MLS Supporters' Shield not already qualified)
3	Inter Miami CF (C)	34	19	7	8	81	55	+26	65	Qualification for the CONCACAF Champions Cup round of 16 (Note: As 2025 MLS Cup champions)
4	San Diego FC	34	19	9	6	64	41	+23	63	Qualification for the CONCACAF Champions Cup round one (Note: As Western Conference regular season winners)
5	Vancouver Whitecaps FC (V)	34	18	7	9	66	38	+28	63	Qualification for the CONCACAF Champions Cup round one (Note: As second highest-ranked club in 2025 MLS Supporters' Shield not already qualified)
6	Los Angeles FC	34	17	8	9	65	40	+25	60	Qualification for the CONCACAF Champions Cup round one (Note: As third highest-ranked club in 2025 MLS Supporters' Shield not already qualified)
7	Charlotte FC	34	19	13	2	55	46	+9	59	
8	Minnesota United FC	34	16	8	10	56	39	+17	58	
9	New York City FC	34	17	12	5	50	44	+6	56	
10	Seattle Sounders FC (L)	34	15	9	10	58	48	+10	55	Qualification for the CONCACAF Champions Cup round of 16 (Note: As winners of Leagues Cup)
11	Nashville SC (U)	34	16	12	6	58	45	+13	54	Qualification for the CONCACAF Champions Cup round one (Note: As winners of U.S. Open Cup)
12	Columbus Crew	34	14	8	12	55	51	+4	54	
13	Chicago Fire FC	34	15	11	8	68	60	+8	53	
14	Orlando City SC	34	14	9	11	63	51	+12	53	
15	Austin FC	34	13	13	8	37	45	−8	47	
16	FC Dallas	34	11	12	11	52	55	−3	44	
17	Portland Timbers	34	11	12	11	41	48	−7	44	
18	New York Red Bulls	34	12	15	7	48	47	+1	43	
19	Real Salt Lake	34	12	17	5	38	49	−11	41	
20	San Jose Earthquakes	34	11	15	8	60	63	−3	41	
21	Colorado Rapids	34	11	15	8	44	56	−12	41	
22	Houston Dynamo FC	34	9	15	10	43	56	−13	37	
23	New England Revolution	34	9	16	9	44	51	−7	36	
24	St. Louis City SC	34	8	18	8	44	58	−14	32	
25	Toronto FC	34	6	14	14	37	44	−7	32	
26	LA Galaxy	34	7	18	9	46	66	−20	30	Qualification for the CONCACAF Champions Cup round one (Note: As third place of Leagues Cup)
27	Sporting Kansas City	34	7	20	7	46	70	−24	28	
28	CF Montréal	34	6	18	10	34	60	−26	28	
29	Atlanta United FC	34	5	16	13	38	63	−25	28	
30	D.C. United	34	5	18	11	30	66	−36	26	

Source: MLS
Rules for classification: 1) points; 2) total wins; 3) total goal differential; 4) total goals scored; 5) fewer disciplinary points; 6) away goal differential; 7) away goals scored; 8) home goals differential; 9) home goals scored; 10) coin toss (2 clubs tied) or drawing of lots (≥3 clubs tied)
(C) MLS Cup champions; (L) Leagues Cup winners; (S) Supporters' Shield winners; (U) U.S. Open Cup winners; (V) Canadian Championship winners

=== Results table ===
Home \ Away	ATL	AUS	CHI	CIN	CLB	CLT	COL	DAL	DCU	HOU	LAX	LFC	MIA	MIN	MTL	NEW	NSH	NYC	NYR	ORL	PHI	POR	RSL	SEA	SDC	SJO	SKC	STL	TOR	VAN
Atlanta United FC			2–2	4–2	4–5	2–3		1–1	1–1				1–2		3–2	0–1	1–1	4–3	0–0	3–2	0–1			2–2	1–1				0–0	
Austin FC	1–1						0–1	1–1		2–2	1–0	1–0		0–3		0–0			2–1			0–0	1–1	2–1	2–1	3–1	1–0	1–3		0–0
Chicago Fire FC	2–1			2–3	2–0	3–2			2–2			2–2	0–0		1–1	3–2	0–2	1–3	1–0	0–0	0–1				1–2			3–2		
FC Cincinnati	2–2	2–1	2–1		2–4	0–1		3–3	1–2				3–0		3–0	1–0	2–1	0–1	1–0	1–1	0–1						2–1		2–0	
Columbus Crew	3–1		4–2	1–1		4–2			2–1	0–0			0–1		2–1	1–2	2–2	0–0	3–1	1–3	1–0					2–1			1–1	2–1
Charlotte FC	2–0		1–4	2–0	3–2				2–1				3–0		1–4	0–1	2–1	2–0	1–0	2–2	2–0		1–0		3–0	4–1			2–0	
Colorado Rapids	3–1	0–2				2–0		3–3		2–1	2–0	2–2		1–1						0–1		0–3	1–0	1–1	3–2	0–2	1–2	1–0		3–0
FC Dallas		2–0	1–3				3–1			0–2	2–1	1–1		1–2				3–4			0–0	2–0	1–1	0–1	2–3	2–4	2–1	3–0		0–1
D.C. United	0–0	2–4	1–7	0–1	1–2	0–1	2–1						1–1		0–0	1–1	0–1	0–0	0–2	1–1	0–6						2–1		2–2	
Houston Dynamo FC		2–0					2–2	1–2			1–1	1–0	1–4	2–0	1–3						1–1	1–0	1–2	1–3	2–4	1–2	1–3	1–0		0–3
LA Galaxy		1–2		2–3			3–0	2–1	2–1	1–1		2–2		2–1						1–2		2–4	2–0	0–4	0–2	0–1	4–1	0–3		3–0
Los Angeles FC	1–0	0–1					3–0	2–0		2–0	3–3			1–0				1–0				0–1	4–1	4–0	1–2	2–1	3–1	2–2	2–0	0–1
Inter Miami CF	4–0		3–5	0–0	5–1	1–0		3–4	3–2		3–1				4–2	4–1	2–1	2–2	4–1	0–3	2–1			3–1					1–1	
Minnesota United FC		1–1	0–3				1–2	0–0		3–1	2–2	0–1	4–1		1–0							1–1	2–0	1–0	2–4	4–1	3–0	3–0		1–3
CF Montréal	1–1	3–2	0–2	1–3	1–1	0–1			1–1			2–2	1–4			0–3	1–1	1–0	0–2	0–0	1–2							0–2	1–6	
New England Revolution	2–0		2–2	0–1	0–1	1–2	3–3		2–0			0–2	1–2		1–3		2–3	2–0	2–1	2–1	0–2					0–0			1–1	
Nashville SC	0–1		7–2	1–2	3–0	2–1			0–0	3–1			2–5		3–0	0–0		2–2	2–1	5–1	1–0	2–0	2–1						1–0	
New York City FC	4–0		3–1	1–0	3–2	2–0			1–2	0–3			0–4	1–2	0–1	2–1	2–1		2–0	2–1	1–0			1–2					3–1	
New York Red Bulls	2–0		2–1	0–1	0–0	4–2			1–2		7–0		1–5	2–2	1–0	5–3	2–0	2–3		2–2	1–0		2–1						2–1	
Orlando City SC	3–0		1–3	1–2	1–1	3–1			4–1				4–1		1–1	3–3	3–2	1–2	0–0		2–4	1–0					3–1		4–2	1–2
Philadelphia Union	3–0		4–0	4–1	2–2	2–1	3–1		3–0		3–2		3–3		2–1	1–0	1–3	1–0	2–0	0–0								1–0	1–1	
Portland Timbers		1–0		2–3			2–1	2–2		3–1	1–1	3–3		1–1		2–1			2–1				0–1	1–1	0–4	1–1	1–0	2–1		1–4
Real Salt Lake		3–1		0–1			1–0	0–1	2–0	1–0	2–0	1–4		1–3								0–0		2–0	1–3	2–1	2–1	3–2	0–1	2–3
Seattle Sounders FC		2–0			1–1	2–2	3–3	1–0		0–0	2–2	5–2		2–3			3–0					1–0	1–0		1–0	3–2	5–2	4–1		2–2
San Diego FC		2–0			1–1		2–0	5–0		3–4	2–1	3–2		1–3			1–0					0–0	1–3	3–0		0–1	0–0	0–0	0–1	1–1
San Jose Earthquakes		2–1					1–2	2–2	6–1	3–3	1–1	2–4	3–3	0–1					1–1			4–1	4–0	1–1	1–2		3–5	1–3		2–1
Sporting Kansas City		1–2				2–1	4–2	2–4		0–0	1–0	0–2		3–3		3–3		1–1				2–4	1–1	2–3	0–2	1–2		2–0		0–2
St. Louis City SC		0–1			1–2		0–0	1–1		2–3	3–3	0–3		1–2			3–1			2–4		2–1	2–2	1–0	1–2	2–1	2–2			0–0
Toronto FC	1–1		1–2	0–1	1–1	0–2			2–0				1–1	0–0	1–1	0–2	1–2	0–1	1–1	4–2	1–2	3–0								0–0
Vancouver Whitecaps FC		5–1	1–3				2–0	1–2		1–1	2–1	2–2		0–0	2–0						7–0	1–1	2–1	3–0	3–5	4–1	3–0	3–2		

Source: MLS
Legend: Blue = home team win; Yellow = draw; Red = away team win.

=== MLS All-Star Game ===
2025 MLS All-Star Game
July 23, 2025
8:00 p.m. CDT

MLS All-Stars (United States) (Canada)	3–1	(Mexico) Liga MX All-Stars
Surridge 28'; Baribo 51'; White 80'	Report	Mora 64'

Q2 Stadium, Austin, Texas
Attendance: 20,738
Referee: Rosendo Mendoza (United States)

== MLS Cup playoffs ==
=== Bracket ===
The higher seeded teams hosted single-elimination matches, with the MLS Cup host determined by overall points in the Supporters' Shield table. During the best-of-three round, the team with higher seed hosted the first match (and the third match, if required).

Wild card single match
E8	Chicago Fire FC	3
E9	Orlando City SC	1
W8	Portland Timbers	3
W9	Real Salt Lake	1

Round one best-of-three series
E1	Philadelphia Union	2 (4)	3	–
E8	Chicago Fire FC	2 (2)	0	–
E4	Charlotte FC	0	0 (7)	1
E5	New York City FC	1	0 (6)	3
E3	Inter Miami CF	3	1	4
E6	Nashville SC	1	2	0
E2	FC Cincinnati	1	0	2
E7	Columbus Crew	0	4	1
W1	San Diego FC	2	2 (2)	4
W8	Portland Timbers	1	2 (3)	0
W4	Minnesota United FC	0 (3)	2	3 (7)
W5	Seattle Sounders FC	0 (2)	4	3 (6)
W3	Los Angeles FC	2	4	–
W6	Austin FC	1	1	–
W2	Vancouver Whitecaps FC	3	1 (4)	–
W7	FC Dallas	0	1 (2)	–

Conference semifinals single match
E1	Philadelphia Union	0
E5	New York City FC	1
Eastern Conference
E3	Inter Miami CF	4
E2	FC Cincinnati	0
W1	San Diego FC	1
W4	Minnesota United FC	0
Western Conference
W3	Los Angeles FC	2 (3)
W2	Vancouver Whitecaps FC (p)	2 (4)

Conference finals single match
E5	New York City FC	1
E3	Inter Miami CF	5
W1	San Diego FC	1
W2	Vancouver Whitecaps FC	3

MLS Cup single match
E3	Inter Miami CF	3
W2	Vancouver Whitecaps FC	1

=== MLS Cup ===
December 6, 2025
2:30 p.m. EST

Inter Miami CF	3–1	Vancouver Whitecaps FC
Ocampo 8' (o.g.); De Paul 71'; Allende 90+6'	Report	Ahmed 60'

Chase Stadium, Fort Lauderdale, Florida
Attendance: 21,556
Referee: Drew Fischer

== Attendance ==
=== Average home attendances ===
Rank	Team	GP	Cumulative	High	Low	Mean
1	Atlanta United FC	17	747,859	65,520	38,882	43,992
2	Seattle Sounders FC	17	526,882	32,913	30,041	30,993
3	Charlotte FC	17	521,282	51,002	26,606	30,664
4	San Diego FC	17	477,091	34,506	22,361	28,064
5	Nashville SC	17	449,367	30,109	22,549	26,433
6	FC Cincinnati	17	419,354	25,513	22,747	24,668
7	New England Revolution	17	416,107	43,293	15,596	24,477
8	Chicago Fire FC	17	398,644	62,358	16,278	23,450
9	Columbus Crew	17	387,511	60,614	19,671	22,795
10	St. Louis City SC	17	381,191	22,423	22,423	22,423
11	Portland Timbers	17	380,891	25,218	20,012	22,405
12	Los Angeles FC	17	372,834	22,937	17,031	21,931
13	New York City FC	17	371,502	40,845	17,070	21,853
14	Vancouver Whitecaps FC	17	370,707	26,741	17,012	21,806
15	Toronto FC	17	362,998	28,855	14,018	21,353
16	Austin FC	17	352,546	20,738	20,738	20,738
17	Orlando City SC	17	349,746	25,046	17,007	20,573
18	Inter Miami CF	17	346,289	21,184	16,888	20,370
19	LA Galaxy	17	341,146	25,224	15,345	20,067
20	Real Salt Lake	17	336,183	20,338	18,853	19,775
21	New York Red Bulls	17	335,077	25,219	11,135	19,710
22	San Jose Earthquakes	17	333,432	50,978	14,147	19,614
23	Minnesota United FC	17	327,203	19,784	17,124	19,247
24	Philadelphia Union	17	311,623	19,357	15,539	18,331
25	Houston Dynamo FC	17	300,781	20,810	14,266	17,693
26	Sporting Kansas City	17	282,261	18,116	14,867	16,604
27	D.C. United	17	278,617	19,365	10,645	16,389
28	CF Montréal	17	274,752	19,619	15,012	16,162
29	Colorado Rapids	17	270,129	18,258	14,497	15,890
30	FC Dallas (Note: Construction at Toyota Stadium temporarily lowered attendance seating to about 11,000.)	17	187,216	11,004	11,004	11,013
Total		510	11,181,221	65,520	10,645	21,983

=== Highest attendances ===
Regular season

Rank	Home team	Score	Away team	Attendance	Date	Matchday	Stadium	Ref.
1	Atlanta United FC	3–2	CF Montréal	65,520	February 22, 2025	1	Mercedes-Benz Stadium	
2	Chicago Fire FC	0–0	Inter Miami CF	62,358	April 13, 2025	8	Soldier Field	
3	Columbus Crew	0–1	Inter Miami CF	60,614	April 19, 2025	9	Huntington Bank Field	
4	Charlotte FC	2–0	Atlanta United FC	51,002	March 1, 2025	2	Bank of America Stadium	
5	Atlanta United FC	1–2	Inter Miami CF	42,843	March 16, 2025	4	Mercedes-Benz Stadium	
6	Atlanta United FC	0–0	New York Red Bulls	42,562	March 8, 2025	3	Mercedes-Benz Stadium	
7	Atlanta United FC	4–3	New York City FC	42,518	March 29, 2025	6	Mercedes-Benz Stadium	
8	Atlanta United FC	1–1	FC Dallas	41,984	April 5, 2025	7	Mercedes-Benz Stadium	
9	Atlanta United FC	1–1	Nashville SC	41,893	May 3, 2025	11	Mercedes-Benz Stadium	
10	Atlanta United FC	0–1	New England Revolution	41,879	April 12, 2025	8	Mercedes-Benz Stadium	

2025 MLS Cup playoffs

Rank	Home team	Score	Away team	Attendance	Date	Stadium	Ref.
1	Vancouver Whitecaps FC	2–2 (4–3 pen.)	Los Angeles FC	53,957	November 22, 2025	BC Place	
2	Charlotte FC	1–3	New York City FC	34,473	November 7, 2025	Bank of America Stadium	
3	Charlotte FC	0–1	New York City FC	33,709	October 28, 2025	Bank of America Stadium	
4	San Diego FC	1–3	Vancouver Whitecaps FC	32,502	November 29, 2025	Snapdragon Stadium	
5	San Diego FC	1–0	Minnesota United FC	32,502	November 24, 2025	Snapdragon Stadium	
6	San Diego FC	4–0	Portland Timbers	32,502	November 9, 2025	Snapdragon Stadium	
7	San Diego FC	2–1	Portland Timbers	32,502	October 26, 2025	Snapdragon Stadium	
8	Vancouver Whitecaps FC	3–0	FC Dallas	32,066	October 26, 2025	BC Place	
9	Nashville SC	2–1	Inter Miami CF	30,109	November 1, 2025	Geodis Park	
10	Seattle Sounders FC	4–2	Minnesota United FC	30,085	November 3, 2025	Lumen Field	

== Player statistics ==
=== Goals ===
Rank	Player	Club	Goals
1	(Argentina) Lionel Messi	Inter Miami CF	29
2	(Gabon) Denis Bouanga	Los Angeles FC	24
2	(England) Sam Surridge	Nashville SC	24
4	(Denmark) Anders Dreyer	San Diego FC	19
5	(Brazil) Evander	FC Cincinnati	18
5	(Serbia) Dejan Joveljić	Sporting Kansas City	18
5	(Croatia) Petar Musa	FC Dallas	18
8	(Cameroon) Eric Maxim Choupo-Moting	New York Red Bulls	17
8	(Belgium) Hugo Cuypers	Chicago Fire FC	17
8	(Costa Rica) Alonso Martínez	New York City FC	17

=== Hat-tricks ===
Player	For	Against	Score	Date
(Israel) Tai Baribo	Philadelphia Union	FC Cincinnati	4–1 (H)	March 1, 2025
(Venezuela) Josef Martínez	San Jose Earthquakes	D.C. United	6–1 (H)	April 6, 2025
(United States) Brian White^{4}	Vancouver Whitecaps FC	Austin FC	5–1 (H)	April 12, 2025
(England) Sam Surridge^{4}	Nashville SC	Chicago Fire FC	7–2 (H)	April 26, 2025
(Argentina) Martín Ojeda	Orlando City SC	New England Revolution	3–3 (H)	May 10, 2025
(United States) Tom Barlow	Chicago Fire FC	D.C. United	1−7 (A)	June 7, 2025
(Brazil) João Klauss	St. Louis City SC	LA Galaxy	3−3 (H)	June 14, 2025
(England) Sam Surridge	Nashville SC	New England Revolution	2–3 (A)	June 25, 2025
(United States) Milan Iloski^{4}	San Diego FC	Vancouver Whitecaps FC	3–5 (A)	June 25, 2025
(Costa Rica) Alonso Martínez	New York City FC	FC Dallas	3−4 (A)	July 25, 2025
(United States) Danny Musovski	Seattle Sounders FC	Sporting Kansas City	5–2 (H)	August 24, 2025
(Israel) Idan Toklomati	Charlotte FC	Inter Miami CF	3–0 (H)	September 13, 2025
(Uruguay) Diego Rossi	Columbus Crew	Atlanta United FC	4–5 (A)	September 13, 2025
(Gabon) Denis Bouanga	Los Angeles FC	San Jose Earthquakes	2–4 (A)	September 13, 2025
(Germany) Thomas Müller	Vancouver Whitecaps FC	Philadelphia Union	7–0 (H)	September 13, 2025
(South Korea) Son Heung-min	Los Angeles FC	Real Salt Lake	1–4 (A)	September 17, 2025
(Gabon) Denis Bouanga	Los Angeles FC	Real Salt Lake	4–1 (H)	September 21, 2025
(Ghana) Joseph Paintsil	LA Galaxy	Sporting Kansas City	4–1 (H)	September 27, 2025
(Argentina) Lionel Messi	Inter Miami CF	Nashville SC	2–5 (A)	October 18, 2025

Notes

(H) – Home team
(A) – Away team
^{4} Scored 4 goals

=== Assists ===
Rank	Player	Club	Assists
1	(Denmark) Anders Dreyer	San Diego FC	19
1	(Argentina) Lionel Messi	Inter Miami CF	19
3	(Spain) Jordi Alba	Inter Miami CF	15
3	(Brazil) Evander	FC Cincinnati	15
3	(Argentina) Martín Ojeda	Orlando City SC	15
3	(Denmark) Philip Zinckernagel	Chicago Fire FC	15
7	(Spain) Carles Gil	New England Revolution	14
8	(Spain) Pep Biel	Charlotte FC	12
8	(Argentina) Cristian Espinoza	San Jose Earthquakes	12
8	(Germany) Hany Mukhtar	Nashville SC	12
8	(Denmark) Jeppe Tverskov	San Diego FC	12

=== Clean sheets ===
Rank	Player	Club	Clean sheets
1	(Japan) Yohei Takaoka	Vancouver Whitecaps FC	13
2	(Croatia) Kristijan Kahlina	Charlotte FC	12
2	(France) Hugo Lloris	Los Angeles FC	12
4	(United States) Roman Celentano	FC Cincinnati	10
4	(Paraguay) Carlos Coronel	New York Red Bulls	10
4	(Cape Verde) CJ dos Santos	San Diego FC	10
4	(Canada) Dayne St. Clair	Minnesota United FC	10
8	(Jamaica) Andre Blake	Philadelphia Union	9
8	(United States) Brad Stuver	Austin FC	9
8	(United States) Joe Willis	Nashville SC	9

== Awards ==
=== Team/Player of the Matchday ===
- **Bold** denotes the Player of the Matchday.

Team of the Matchday
Matchday	Goalkeeper	Defenders	Midfielders	Forwards	Bench	Coach
1	(United States) Steffen (COL)	(Colombia) Ceballos (NE) (United States) Robinson (CIN) (Brazil) Rodrigues (SJ)	(Uruguay) Rossi (CLB) (United States) Gutiérrez (CHI) (Cameroon) Enow (DC) (Canada) Nelson (VAN)	(Denmark) **Dreyer** (SD) (Ivory Coast) Latte Lath (ATL) (Argentina) Messi (MIA)	(Brazil) Daniel (SJ) (Brazil) Marlon (LAFC) (Argentina) Espinoza (SJ) (Ecuador) Vite (VAN) (Croatia) Pašalić (ORL) (Israel) Baribo (PHI) (United States) Morris (SEA) (Croatia) Musa (DAL) (Togo) Denkey (CIN)	(United States) Mikey Varas (SD)
2	(United States) Brady (CHI)	(United States) Hollingshead (LAFC) (New Zealand) Boxall (MIN) (Algeria) Farsi (CLB)	(Ivory Coast) Zaha (CLT) (Sweden) Forsberg (RBNY) (Uruguay) Araújo (ORL) (Venezuela) Segovia (MIA)	(United States) White (VAN) (Israel) **Baribo** (PHI) (Uruguay) Suárez (MIA)	(Canada) Pantemis (POR) (United States) Freeman (ORL) (Denmark) Tverskov (SD) (United States) Q. Sullivan (PHI) (Portugal) Da Costa (POR) (Italy) Yeboah (MIN) (Brazil) Navarro (COL) (Croatia) Musa (DAL) (Belgium) Cuypers (CHI)	(South Africa) Bradley Carnell (PHI)
3	(Switzerland) **Bürki** (STL)	(Uruguay) Laborda (VAN) (New Zealand) Boxall (MIN) (Honduras) Najar (NSH)	(Slovakia) Rusnák (SEA) (Italy) Bright (MIA) (Serbia) Lukić (PHI) (Germany) Teuchert (STL)	(Japan) Kubo (CIN) (Belgium) Cuypers (CHI) (Denmark) Dreyer (SD)	(Paraguay) Coronel (RBNY) (Greece) Allen (MIA) (Germany) Wagner (PHI) (Norway) Tagseth (NSH) (United States) Shore (NYC) (United States) Kossa-Rienzi (SEA) (United States) Rothrock (SEA) (Argentina) Allende (MIA) (Brazil) Navarro (COL)	(United States) Brian Schmetzer (SEA)
4	(United States) Steffen (COL)	(United States) Gutman (CHI) (United States) Blackmon (VAN) (Republic of Ireland) Gallagher (ATX)	(United States) Luna (RSL) (Colombia) Atuesta (ORL) (Germany) Löwen (STL) (Finland) Valakari (SD)	(Canada) **Oluwaseyi** (MIN) (England) Surridge (NSH) (Argentina) Messi (MIA)	(Canada) Sirois (MTL) (United States) Kessler (STL) (United States) Zimmerman (NSH) (United States) Eneli (RSL) (United States) Berhalter (VAN) (Costa Rica) A. Martínez (NYC) (Serbia) Joveljić (SKC) (Cameroon) Choupo-Moting (RBNY) (United States) Agyemang (CLT)	(Denmark) Jesper Sørensen (VAN)
5	(United States) Freese (NYC)	(United States) Zimmerman (NSH) (United States) Long (LAFC) (United States) Freeman (ORL)	(Brazil) Evander (CIN) (Sweden) Forsberg (RBNY) (United States) Wolff (ATX) (Spain) **Biel** (CLT)	(Argentina) Ojeda (ORL) (Italy) Yeboah (MIN) (Denmark) Zinckernagel (CHI)	(France) Lloris (LAFC) (Argentina) Glavinovich (PHI) (Colombia) Garcés (LA) (England) Westwood (CLT) (Argentina) Acosta (DAL) (Mexico) Pérez (NSH) (Brazil) Antony (POR) (Georgia (country)) Lobjanidze (ATL) (Colombia) Muriel (ORL)	(United States) Gregg Berhalter (CHI)
6	(United States) Celentano (CIN)	(Colombia) Díaz (MIN) (Sweden) McVey (SD) (United States) Campbell (MTL)	(United States) **Mihailovic** (COL) (Spain) Gil (NE) (Brazil) Evander (CIN) (Brazil) Antony (POR)	(Uruguay) Rossi (CLB) (Canada) Oluwaseyi (MIN) (Ivory Coast) Latte Lath (ATL)	(Brazil) Daniel (SJ) (United States) Hines-Ike (ATX) (Argentina) Acosta (DAL) (Slovakia) Rusnák (SEA) (Argentina) Messi (MIA) (Albania) Uzuni (ATX) (Finland) Valakari (SD) (Paraguay) Almirón (ATL) (Chile) Mora (POR)	(United States) Mikey Varas (SD)
7	(Paraguay) Coronel (RBNY)	(Denmark) Engel (CIN) (United States) Blackmon (VAN) (United States) Dorsey (HOU)	(Italy) Bernardeschi (TOR) (United States) Luna (RSL) (United States) Trapp (MIN) (Mexico) Lozano (SD)	(Venezuela) **J. Martínez** (SJ) (Serbia) Joveljić (SKC) (Canada) Russell-Rowe (CLB)	(United States) Stuver (ATX) (Panama) Valencia (RBNY) (Denmark) Tverskov (SD) (Argentina) Pereyra (MIN) (United States) McGlynn (HOU) (Spain) García (SKC) (Argentina) Espinoza (SJ) (Israel) Toklomati (CLT) (Croatia) Musa (DAL)	(United States) Kerry Zavagnin (SKC)
8	(Slovenia) Ivačič (NE)	(United States) Lovitz (NSH) (Cape Verde) Moreira (CLB) (Spain) Palencia (LAFC)	(United States) Valenzuela (CIN) (Argentina) Ayala (POR) (Spain) Gil (NE) (Uruguay) Fagúndez (LA)	(United States) **White** (VAN) (Venezuela) Kelsy (POR) (Brazil) Navarro (COL)	(Argentina) Ustari (MIA) (France) Malanda (CLT) (United States) Robinson (CIN) (Norway) Tagseth (NSH) (Mexico) Vargas (SEA) (United States) Mihailovic (COL) (United States) Sabbi (VAN) (Costa Rica) A. Martínez (NYC) (Uruguay) Rossi (CLB)	(Denmark) Jesper Sørensen (VAN)
9	(United States) Johnson (TOR)	(Belgium) Ndenbe (SKC) (United States) Privett (CLT) (Argentina) Weigandt (MIA)	(United States) Cremaschi (MIA) (United States) Q. Sullivan (PHI) (Brazil) Evander (CIN) (Brazil) Peglow (DC)	(Hungary) **Sallói** (SKC) (Chile) Mora (POR) (Cameroon) Ganago (NE)	(Peru) Gallese (ORL) (Colombia) Yeimar (SEA) (Colombia) Ocampo (VAN) (United States) Wolff (ATX) (United States) Mihailovic (COL) (Czech Republic) Lingr (HOU) (United States) Ferreira (SEA) (Gabon) Bouanga (LAFC) (Colombia) Arango (SJ)	(England) Dean Smith (CLT)
10	(Slovenia) Ivačič (NE)	(United States) Arfsten (CLB) (Norway) Glesnes (PHI) (Honduras) Najar (NSH)	(Brazil) Antony (POR) (United States) Luna (RSL) (Ecuador) Vite (VAN) (Germany) Mukhtar (NSH)	(England) **Surridge** (NSH) (Togo) Denkey (CIN) (Gabon) Bouanga (LAFC)	(Jamaica) Blake (PHI) (Sweden) Eile (RBNY) (United States) Freeman (ORL) (Spain) Gil (NE) (United States) Mihailovic (COL) (Brazil) Pedrinho (DAL) (Czech Republic) Lingr (HOU) (Croatia) Pašalić (ORL) (Costa Rica) A. Martínez (NYC)	(United States) B. J. Callaghan (NSH)
11	(Peru) Gallese (ORL)	(Cameroon) Nouhou (SEA) (United States) Blackmon (VAN) (Argentina) Weigandt (MIA)	(Spain) Gil (NE) (Argentina) Pereyra (MIN) (France) Chambost (CLB) (United States) Vassilev (PHI)	(Mexico) **Lozano** (SD) (Denmark) Dreyer (SD) (Argentina) Espinoza (SJ)	(United States) Freese (NYC) (Germany) Voloder (SKC) (United States) Lovitz (NSH) (Algeria) Farsi (CLB) (Mexico) Vargas (SEA) (England) Kent (SEA) (El Salvador) Ordaz (LAFC) (Colombia) Arango (SJ) (Belgium) Benteke (DC)	(France) Wilfried Nancy (CLB)
12	(United States) Johnson (TOR)	(Honduras) Najar (NSH) (United States) Zawadzki (CLB) (United States) Jones (SJ)	(Argentina) Ojeda (ORL) (Sweden) **Forsberg** (RBNY) (Brazil) Evander (CIN) (Slovakia) Rusnák (SEA)	(Cameroon) Choupo-Moting (RBNY) (Germany) Owusu (MTL) (United States) White (VAN)	(United States) Freese (NYC) (Panama) Valencia (RBNY) (Mali) Kouamé (CHI) (Finland) Lod (MIN) (United States) Luna (RSL) (Colombia) Moreno (POR) (Spain) Gil (NE) (Italy) Insigne (TOR) (Denmark) Dreyer (SD)	(Wales) Eric Ramsay (MIN)
13	(United States) Barraza (DC)	(Brazil) Andrade (HOU) (United States) Harriel (PHI) (Slovenia) Brekalo (ORL)	(Germany) Mukhtar (NSH) (United States) Leroux (SJ) (Argentina) Ojeda (ORL) (Argentina) Allende (MIA)	(Turkey) Ünder (LAFC) (Israel) **Baribo** (PHI) (Denmark) Dreyer (SD)	(United States) Dos Santos (SD) (Sweden) McVey (SD) (Canada) Petrasso (MTL) (Spain) Alba (MIA) (Brazil) Pompeu (STL) (Germany) Reus (LA) (United States) Vázquez (ATX) (Serbia) Joveljić (SKC) (Togo) Denkey (CIN)	(Colombia) Óscar Pareja (ORL)
14	(Peru) Gallese (ORL)	(United States) Gutman (CHI) (Germany) Voloder (SKC) (United States) Dorsey (HOU)	(United States) Gutiérrez (CHI) (Argentina) Pereyra (MIN) (United States) Mihailovic (COL) (Germany) **Reus** (LA)	(Italy) Bernardeschi (TOR) (Costa Rica) A. Martínez (NYC) (Canada) Corbeanu (TOR)	(United States) Celentano (CIN) (Brazil) Thiago Martins (NYC) (France) Gerbet (ORL) (United States) McGlynn (HOU) (Slovakia) Rusnák (SEA) (Uruguay) Rossi (CLB) (Gabon) Bouanga (LAFC) (Norway) Brynhildsen (TOR) (Canada) Oluwaseyi (MIN)	(Colombia) Óscar Pareja (ORL)
15	(Paraguay) Coronel (RBNY)	(Slovenia) Kolmanič (ATX) (Republic of Ireland) Williams (ATL) (United States) Dorsey (HOU)	(Mexico) Lozano (SD) (Spain) Biel (CLT) (United States) Delgado (LAFC) (Argentina) Messi (MIA)	(United States) **Agyemang** (CLT) (United States) White (VAN) (England) Surridge (NSH)	(United States) Guzan (ATL) (New Zealand) Boxall (MIN) (Colombia) Atuesta (ORL) (Slovakia) Rusnák (SEA) (United States) Luna (RSL) (Ivory Coast) Zaha (CLT) (Austria) Wolf (NYC) (United States) Judd (SJ) (Israel) Baribo (PHI)	(Norway) Ronny Deila (ATL)
16	(Switzerland) Frei (SEA)	(Colombia) Fory (POR) (United States) Harriel (PHI) (Germany) Wagner (PHI)	(Argentina) **Messi** (MIA) (Russia) Miranchuk (ATL) (Germany) Mukhtar (NSH) (Brazil) Antony (POR)	(United States) Segal (HOU) (Uruguay) Suárez (MIA) (Cameroon) Choupo-Moting (RBNY)	(United States) Edwards Jr. (SJ) (United States) Ibeagha (DAL) (United States) Awodesu (HOU) (Poland) Slisz (ATL) (Portugal) Da Costa (POR) (Brazil) Pirani (DC) (United States) Ferreira (SEA) (England) Surridge (NSH) (Chile) Rubio (ATX)	(United States) Ben Olsen (HOU)
17	(United States) Pulskamp (SKC)	(United States) Miller (NE) (Germany) Hack (RBNY) (Israel) Feingold (NE)	(Austria) Wolf (NYC) (Brazil) Pirani (DC) (Germany) Löwen (STL) (Argentina) **Messi** (MIA)	(Belgium) Cuypers (CHI) (Serbia) Joveljić (SKC) (Canada) Oluwaseyi (MIN)	(United States) Bingham (CLT) (United States) Antley (DC) (Uruguay) Sanabria (LA) (United States) De la Torre (SD) (United States) Parks (NYC) (Finland) Lod (MIN) (Denmark) Zinckernagel (CHI) (United States) Harper (RBNY) (England) Surridge (NSH)	(Argentina) Javier Mascherano (MIA)
18				(United States) **Barlow** (CHI)		
19	(United States) Willis (NSH)	(Brazil) Biro (ATX) (United States) Neal (MTL) (Colombia) Mosquera (POR)	(Austria) Wolf (NYC) (Argentina) Acosta (DAL) (Germany) Reus (LA) (Denmark) Dreyer (SD)	(Brazil) **Klauss** (STL) (Germany) Owusu (MTL) (United States) Iloski (SD)	(United States) Celentano (CIN) (Argentina) Schlegel (ORL) (Denmark) Tverskov (SD) (Argentina) Moralez (NYC) (Brazil) Gabriel Pec (LA) (Uruguay) Rossi (CLB) (England) Surridge (NSH) (United States) Anderson (PHI) (Togo) Denkey (CIN)	(South Africa) Bradley Carnell (PHI)
20	(United States) Pulskamp (SKC)	(Denmark) Engel (CIN) (New Zealand) Boxall (MIN) (Argentina) Herrera (CLB)	(South Africa) Hlongwane (MIN) (Brazil) Evander (CIN) (Colombia) Atuesta (ORL) (Denmark) Dreyer (SD)	(Argentina) Enrique (ORL) (England) Surridge (NSH) (United States) **Iloski** (SD)	(United States) Johnson (TOR) (United States) Markanich (MIN) (Spain) García (SKC) (United States) Mihailovic (COL) (Argentina) Espinoza (SJ) (Croatia) Pašalić (ORL) (Canada) Russell-Rowe (CLB) (Uruguay) Damiani (PHI) (Colombia) Arango (SJ)	(United States) Mikey Varas (SD)
21	(Brazil) Daniel (SJ)	(Brazil) Andrade (HOU) (United States) Duncan (RBNY) (Algeria) Farsi (CLB)	(Denmark) Dreyer (SD) (Spain) Gil (NE) (Brazil) **Evander** (CIN) (Denmark) Zinckernagel (CHI)	(Cameroon) Choupo-Moting (RBNY) (United States) Ferreira (SEA) (Brazil) Navarro (COL)	(United States) Pulskamp (SKC) (United States) Miazga (CIN) (Spain) Coello (TOR) (Canada) Loturi (CF) (Spain) Biel (CLT) (Germany) Thommy (SKC) (Germany) Reus (LA) (United States) Sabbi (VAN) (United States) Yapi (COL)	(United States) Pat Noonan (CIN)
22	(United States) Pulskamp (SKC)	(Panama) Harvey (MIN) (United States) Bartlow (HOU) (Slovenia) Ilenič (NYC)	(Brazil) Evander (CIN) (Germany) Thommy (SKC) (Spain) Biel (CLT) (Austria) Wolf (NYC)	(Ghana) Paintsil (LA) (Argentina) Ponce (HOU) (Argentina) **Messi** (MIA)	(Argentina) Ustari (MIA) (United States) Smith (POR) (United States) Markanich (MIN) (Portugal) Gonçalves (RSL) (Portugal) Da Costa (POR) (Finland) Valakari (SD) (Argentina) Allende (MIA) (Germany) Mukhtar (NSH) (Argentina) Enrique (ORL)	(United States) Ben Olsen (HOU)
23	No team created					
24	(United States) Stuver (ATX)	(United States) Bombino (SD) (Denmark) Maxsø (COL) (United States) Arfsten (CLB)	(Germany) Reus (LA) (United States) Mihailovic (COL) (Germany) Hartel (STL) (Denmark) Dreyer (SD)	(Gabon) Bouanga (LAFC) (Canada) Oluwaseyi (MIN) (Argentina) **Messi** (MIA)	(Slovenia) Ivačič (NE) (South Africa) Makhanya (PHI) (United States) Vassilev (PHI) (Slovakia) Rusnák (SEA) (Uruguay) Rossi (CLB) (Mexico) Lozano (SD) (Italy) Yeboah (MIN) (Nigeria) Agada (RSL) (Israel) Toklomati (CLT)	(France) Wilfried Nancy (CLB)
25	(United States) Freese (NYC)	(Honduras) Najar (NSH) (South Africa) Makhanya (PHI) (Colombia) Segura (LAFC)	(Spain) Biel (CLT) (Brazil) **Evander** (CIN) (Slovakia) Rusnák (SEA) (Sweden) Forsberg (RBNY)	(Albania) Uzuni (ATX) (Cameroon) Choupo-Moting (RBNY) (Croatia) Musa (DAL)	(United States) Willis (NSH) (Ghana) Donkor (RBNY) (United States) Berhalter (VAN) (Portugal) Gonçalves (RSL) (Denmark) Zinckernagel (CHI) (Canada) Corbeanu (TOR) (Ecuador) Campana (NE) (England) Surridge (NSH) (Venezuela) J. Martínez (SJ)	(United States) Pat Noonan (CIN)
26	(United States) Celentano (CIN)	(Spain) Alba (MIA) (England) Elliott (CHI) (Japan) Yoshida (LA)	(Gabon) Bouanga (LAFC) (Argentina) Ojeda (ORL) (Spain) Biel (CLT) (Venezuela) Segovia (MIA)	(United States) Musovski (SEA) (Croatia) Musa (DAL) (Argentina) **Messi** (MIA)	(United States) Brady (CHI) (United States) Pilcher (SD) (Argentina) Orellano (CIN) (Hungary) Gazdag (CLB) (United States) Fernandez (POR) (Argentina) De la Vega (SEA) (Ivory Coast) Zaha (CLT) (Brazil) Gabriel Pec (LA) (England) Surridge (NSH)	(Argentina) Javier Mascherano (MIA)
27	(Peru) Gallese (ORL)	(England) Elliot (CHI) (Ghana) Duah (SD) (Uruguay) Laborda (VAN)	(Argentina) Ojeda (ORL) (United States) Wolff (ATX) (Cameroon) Ngando (VAN) (Denmark) Uhre (PHI)	(Costa Rica) **A. Martínez** (NYC) (Argentina) Enrique (ORL) (Italy) Yeboah (MIN)	(Mexico) Sisniega (SD) (United States) Cremaschi (MIA) (Paraguay) Paredes (POR) (Paraguay) Ojeda (RSL) (Argentina) Moralez (NYC) (Russia) Miranchuk (ATL) (Ghana) Bukari (ATX) (Colombia) Angulo (ORL) (United States) Farrington (DAL)	(Colombia) Óscar Pareja (ORL)
28	(Croatia) Kahlina (CLT)	(United States) Hollingshead (LAFC) (Ghana) Abubakar (DAL) (United States) Orozco (STL)	(Denmark) Zinckernagel (CHI) (Spain) Gil (NE) (United States) McGlynn (HOU) (Denmark) Dreyer (SD)	(Colombia) **Muriel** (ORL) (United States) Musovski (SEA) (Cameroon) Choupo-Moting (RBNY)	(United States) Dos Santos (SD) (Brazil) Biro (ATX) (El Salvador) A. Roldán (SEA) (Russia) Miranchuk (ATL) (Argentina) Ojeda (ORL) (Ivory Coast) Zaha (CLT) (Canada) Kerr (TOR) (United States) Judd (SJ) (United States) Yapi (COL)	(Colombia) Óscar Pareja (ORL)
29	(Croatia) Kahlina (CLT)	(Spain) Alba (MIA) (United States) Ream (CLT) (United States) Nealis (RBNY)	(Argentina) Messi (MIA) (Czech Republic) Bucha (CIN) (Brazil) Evander (CIN) (Denmark) Zinckernagel (CHI)	(Denmark) Ingvartsen (SD) (Brazil) **Navarro** (COL) (South Korea) Son (LAFC)	(Paraguay) Coronel (RBNY) (Canada) Petrasso (MTL) (Brazil) Artur (HOU) (United States) Delgado (LAFC) (United States) Wolff (ATX) (United States) Gutiérrez (CHI) (Argentina) Ojeda (ORL) (Uruguay) Suárez (MIA) (Venezuela) Kelsy (POR)	(United States) Mikey Varas (SD)
30	(United States) Collodi (DAL)	(Germany) Wagner (PHI) (United States) Munie (SJ) (Mali) Fofana (NE)	(Japan) Yamane (LA) (Finland) Lod (MIN) (Australia) O'Neill (NYC) (Germany) Mukhtar (NSH)	(United States) **Musovski** (SEA) (England) Surridge (NSH) (South Korea) Son (LAFC)	(Croatia) Kahlina (CLT) (United States) Bauer (NSH) (United States) Wynder (LA) (United States) Leyva (SEA) (Argentina) Rodríguez (MIA) (United States) Iloski (PHI) (Germany) Müller (VAN) (Germany) Owusu (MTL) (Costa Rica) A. Martínez (NYC)	(Netherlands) Pascal Jansen (NYC)
31	(Canada) Hibbert (ATL)	(United States) Nealis (RBNY) (Venezuela) Hernández (ATL) (Germany) Wagner (PHI)	(United States) Wolff (ATX) (Canada) Osorio (TOR) (Denmark) Tverskov (SD) (Czech Republic) Lingr (HOU)	(Denmark) **Dreyer** (SD) (Serbia) Joveljić (SKC) (Brazil) Pirani (DC)	(United States) Schulte (CLB) (United States) Haak (NYC) (Finland) Lod (MIN) (Colombia) Alzate (ATL) (England) Westwood (CLT) (Argentina) Ponce (HOU) (Uruguay) Damiani (PHI) (Ghana) Bukari (ATX) (Hungary) Sallói (SKC)	(South Africa) Bradley Carnell (PHI)
32	(United States) **Jackson** (DAL)					
33	(Canada) St. Clair (MIN)	(United States) Kamungo (DAL) (Japan) Yamane (LA) (United States) Freeman (ORL)	(United States) Sabbi (VAN) (Brazil) Evander (CIN) (Greece) Triantis (MIN) (Uruguay) Rossi (CLB)	(Gabon) Bouanga (LAFC) (Israel) Toklomati (CLT) (Germany) **Müller** (VAN)	(Croatia) Kahlina (CLT) (Uruguay) Laborda (VAN) (Norway) Wallem (STL) (United States) Berhalter (VAN) (Canada) Ahmed (VAN) (Hungary) Gazdag (CLB) (United States) Gozo (RSL) (Senegal) Thiaré (ATL) (United States) Musovski (SEA)	(Denmark) Jesper Sørensen (VAN)
34				(South Korea) **Son** (LAFC)		
35	(United States) Stuver (ATX)	(Canada) Laryea (TOR) (Canada) Waterman (CHI) (Colombia) Ocampo (VAN)	(United States) McSorley (STL) (Brazil) Evander (CIN) (Argentina) Ojeda (ORL) (Gabon) **Bouanga** (LAFC)	(Argentina) Messi (MIA) (Costa Rica) A. Martínez (NYC) (South Korea) Son (LAFC)	(United States) Freese (NYC) (United States) Parker (RBNY) (United States) Cappis (DAL) (United States) McGlynn (HOU) (Paraguay) Almirón (ATL) (Germany) Hartel (STL) (Albania) Uzuni (ATX) (Belgium) Benteke (DC) (Brazil) Brenner (CIN)	(Netherlands) Pascal Jansen (NYC)
36	No team created					
37	(United States) Johnson (TOR)	(United States) Gutman (CHI) (Brazil) Thiago Martins (NYC) (United States) Freeman (ORL)	(United States) Vassilev (PHI) (Greece) Triantis (MIN) (Paraguay) Ojeda (RSL) (Trinidad and Tobago) Sealy (MTL)	(Israel) Turgeman (NE) (South Korea) Son (LAFC) (Ghana) **Paintsil** (LA)	(Peru) Gallese (ORL) (Ukraine) Smolyakov (LAFC) (Honduras) Najar (NSH) (Slovakia) Rusnák (SEA) (United States) Luna (RSL) (United States) Iloski (PHI) (Denmark) Uhre (PHI) (Croatia) Musa (DAL) (Venezuela) J. Martínez (SJ)	(Netherlands) Pascal Jansen (NYC)
38	(Brazil) Cabral (RSL)	(Spain) Alba (MIA) (England) Elliott (CHI) (United States) Markanich (MIN)	(Argentina) Messi (MIA) (United States) **Berhalter** (VAN) (Germany) Hartel (STL) (Germany) Müller (VAN)	(Denmark) Dreyer (SD) (Denmark) Uhre (PHI) (Argentina) Allende (MIA)	(United States) Brady (CHI) (Argentina) Herrera (CLB) (Ecuador) Delgado (DAL) (Argentina) Pereyra (MIN) (Denmark) Zinckernagel (CHI) (Argentina) De la Vega (SEA) (Gabon) Bouanga (LAFC) (Norway) Pellegrino (SD) (Togo) Denkey (CIN)	(South Africa) Bradley Carnell (PHI)
39	(Croatia) Kahlina (CLT)	(Netherlands) Urhoghide (DAL) (United States) Ragen (SEA) (Colombia) Herrera (CLB)	(Colombia) Vargas (CLT) (Brazil) Evander (CIN) (United States) Mihailovic (TOR) (Norway) Pellegrino (SD)	(Denmark) Dreyer (SD) (Nigeria) Olatunji (RSL) (Argentina) **Messi** (MIA)	(United States) Collodi (DAL) (Brazil) Kaick (DAL) (Canada) Osorio (TOR) (Hungary) Gazdag (CLB) (United States) Tsakiris (SJ) (Paraguay) Almirón (ATL) (Republic of Ireland) Moran (LAFC) (Denmark) Zinckernagel (CHI) (Ghana) Paintsil (LA)	(United States) Eric Quill (DAL)

=== Goal of the Matchday ===
Goal of the Matchday
Matchday	Player	Club	Ref.
1	(Colombia) Edwin Mosquera	Atlanta United FC	
2	(Argentina) Tadeo Allende	Inter Miami CF	
3	(Argentina) Tadeo Allende	Inter Miami CF	
4	(Costa Rica) Alonso Martínez	New York City FC	
5	(Croatia) Marco Pašalić	Orlando City SC	
6	(Spain) Carles Gil	New England Revolution	
7	(Israel) Idan Toklomati	Charlotte FC	
8	(Uruguay) Diego Fagúndez	LA Galaxy	
9	(United States) Quinn Sullivan	Philadelphia Union	
10	(Togo) Kévin Denkey	FC Cincinnati	
11	(Argentina) Lionel Messi	Inter Miami CF	
12	(Colombia) Santiago Moreno	Portland Timbers	
13	(Brazil) Célio Pompeu	St. Louis City SC	
14	(United States) Jack McGlynn	Houston Dynamo FC	
15	(Argentina) Lionel Messi	Inter Miami CF	
16	(Argentina) Lionel Messi	Inter Miami CF	
17	(Serbia) Dejan Joveljić	Sporting Kansas City	
18	(Brazil) Antony	Portland Timbers	
19	(Brazil) João Klauss	St. Louis City SC	
20	(South Africa) Bongokuhle Hlongwane	Minnesota United FC	
21	(United States) Beau Leroux	San Jose Earthquakes	
22	(Argentina) Lionel Messi	Inter Miami CF	
23	No goal awarded		
24	(Argentina) Lionel Messi	Inter Miami CF	
25	(Sweden) Emil Forsberg	New York Red Bulls	
26	(Spain) Jordi Alba	Inter Miami CF	
27	(Russia) Aleksei Miranchuk	Atlanta United FC	
28	(Mexico) Hirving Lozano	San Diego FC	
29	(Argentina) Lionel Messi	Inter Miami CF	
30	(South Korea) Son Heung-min	Los Angeles FC	
31	(Germany) Eduard Löwen	St. Louis City SC	
32	No goal awarded		
33	(Greece) Nectarios Triantis	Minnesota United FC	
34	No goal awarded		
35	(Argentina) Lionel Messi	Inter Miami CF	
36 & 37	(Canada) Kamal Miller	Portland Timbers	
38	(Togo) Kévin Denkey	FC Cincinnati	

=== Player of the Month ===
Month	Player	Club	Stats	Ref.
February/March	(Israel) Tai Baribo	Philadelphia Union	5 matches played, 6 goals, 0 assists	
April	(United States) Brian White	Vancouver Whitecaps FC	3 matches played, 5 goals, 0 assists	
May	(Argentina) Lionel Messi	Inter Miami CF	7 matches played, 7 goals, 4 assists	
June	(Denmark) Anders Dreyer	San Diego FC	3 matches played, 3 goals, 6 assists	
July	(Argentina) Lionel Messi	Inter Miami CF	5 matches played, 8 goals, 3 assists	
August	(Denmark) Anders Dreyer	San Diego FC	4 matches played, 3 goals, 2 assists	
September	(Gabon) Denis Bouanga	Los Angeles FC	4 matches played, 8 goals, 1 assist	
October	(Argentina) Lionel Messi	Inter Miami CF	3 matches played, 5 goals, 5 assists	

=== End-of-season awards ===
Award	Winner (club)	Ref.
Most Valuable Player	Lionel Messi (Inter Miami CF)	
Defender of the Year	Tristan Blackmon (Vancouver Whitecaps FC)	
Goalkeeper of the Year	Dayne St. Clair (Minnesota United FC)	
Coach of the Year	Bradley Carnell (Philadelphia Union)	
Young Player of the Year	Alex Freeman (Orlando City SC)	
Newcomer of the Year	Anders Dreyer (San Diego FC)	
Comeback Player of the Year	Nick Hagglund (FC Cincinnati)	
Golden Boot	Lionel Messi (Inter Miami CF)	
Audi Goals Drive Progress Impact Award	Diego Luna (Real Salt Lake)	
Referee of the Year	Drew Fischer	
Assistant Referee of the Year	Cory Richardson	
Goal of the Year	Son Heung-min (Los Angeles FC)	
Save of the Year	Roman Celentano (FC Cincinnati)	

=== MLS Best XI ===
Goalkeeper	Defenders	Midfielders	Forwards	Ref.
(Canada) Dayne St. Clair, Minnesota	(United States) Tristan Blackmon, Vancouver (United States) Alex Freeman, Orlando (Norway) Jakob Glesnes, Philadelphia (Germany) Kai Wagner, Philadelphia	(United States) Sebastian Berhalter, Vancouver (Brazil) Evander, Cincinnati (United States) Cristian Roldan, Seattle	(Gabon) Denis Bouanga, LAFC (Denmark) Anders Dreyer, San Diego (Argentina) Lionel Messi, Miami	

== Broadcasting ==
Apple TV, through MLS Season Pass, held the rights to stream every MLS match around the world via a 10-year deal that started in 2023. This was the first season MLS Season Pass aired Sunday Night Soccer, a primetime Sunday game each week that was available to all Apple TV+ subscribers.

=== United States ===
This was the third-year of a four-year deal with Fox Sports for the exclusive rights to MLS games on linear television in the United States. Fox Sports aired 34 matches during the 2025 season, with 19 on Fox Sports 1 and 15 on Fox in English. All 34 matches aired in Spanish on Fox Deportes.

This was the first year DirecTV and Xfinity held the right to distribute MLS Season Pass to residential customers via their cable services.

For the first time, several teams announced agreements with local over-the-air stations, to rebroadcast matches at least 48 hours after their conclusion. FC Dallas announced an agreement with KDFI-TV, Charlotte FC with WAXN-TV, FC Cincinnati with WXIX-TV and Rock Entertainment Sports Network, LAFC with KCOP-TV, St. Louis City SC with KMOV-TV (the Matrix Midwest network) and the Seattle Sounders with KCPQ-TV. These were the first such agreements since 2022.

=== Canada ===
This was the third-year of a four-year deal with TSN and RDS for the exclusive rights to MLS games on linear television in Canada. TSN and RDS aired 41 matches during the 2025 season.

=== International ===
Internationally, since Apple TV acquired the rights to Major League Soccer in 2023, MLS Season Pass exclusively aired the MLS outside the United States and Canada. However, in 2025, Major League Soccer announced agreements with SBS in Australia, Dubai TV in the Middle East, TV3 in Spain, Sportdigital in Germany, and SkyK in South Korea to air Sunday Night Soccer matches.

== See also ==
- 2025 U.S. Open Cup
- 2025 Leagues Cup
- 2025 Canadian Championship
- 2025 CONCACAF Champions Cup
- 2025 FIFA Club World Cup
