= Jamir Berdecio =

Bolivian footballer (born 2002)

Personal information
- Full name: José Jamir Berdecio Mendoza
- Date of birth: 12 August 2002 (age 24)
- Place of birth: Santa Cruz, Bolivia
- Height: 1.74 m (5 ft 9 in)
- Position: Right back

Team information
- Current team: Oriente Petrolero

Senior career*
Years	Team	Apps	(Gls)
2021–	Oriente Petrolero	33	(0)
2024	→ Philadelphia Union II (loan)	31	(0)

International career^{‡}
2024–	Bolivia	1	(0)
- * Club domestic league appearances and goals as of 08:32, 14 February 2025 (UTC) ‡ National team caps and goals as of 12:06, 8 September 2024 (UTC)

José Jamir Berdecio Mendoza (born 12 August 2002) is a Bolivian footballer who plays as a right back for Oriente Petrolero.

== Club career ==
Born in Santa Cruz de la Sierra, Berdecio began his career at Oriente Petrolero, making his senior debut in 2021. In January 2024, he moved on loan to the Philadelphia Union of Major League Soccer, on a one-year loan with the option of a permanent transfer. He already had a United States green card due to relatives in the country.

Berdecio was assigned to the reserve team, Philadelphia Union II, in MLS Next Pro. He made his debut on 17 March as the season began with a 2–1 home win over Toronto FC II.

== International career ==
Berdecio was one of 35 players chosen by Bolivia under-23 for the 2024 CONMEBOL Pre-Olympic Tournament in Venezuela. He missed out on the final 23-man squad as he was not given permission to travel by his new club, the Philadelphia Union.

Bolivia manager Antônio Carlos Zago named Berdecio as one of nine new players in a 26-man squad for a friendly against Mexico in the United States, prior to the 2024 Copa América. He debuted in the 1–0 loss to the Mexicans on 31 May at Soldier Field in Chicago, playing the last 12 minutes as a substitute, but was not called up for the tournament.
