= Bradley Carnell =

South African soccer player and coach (born 1977)

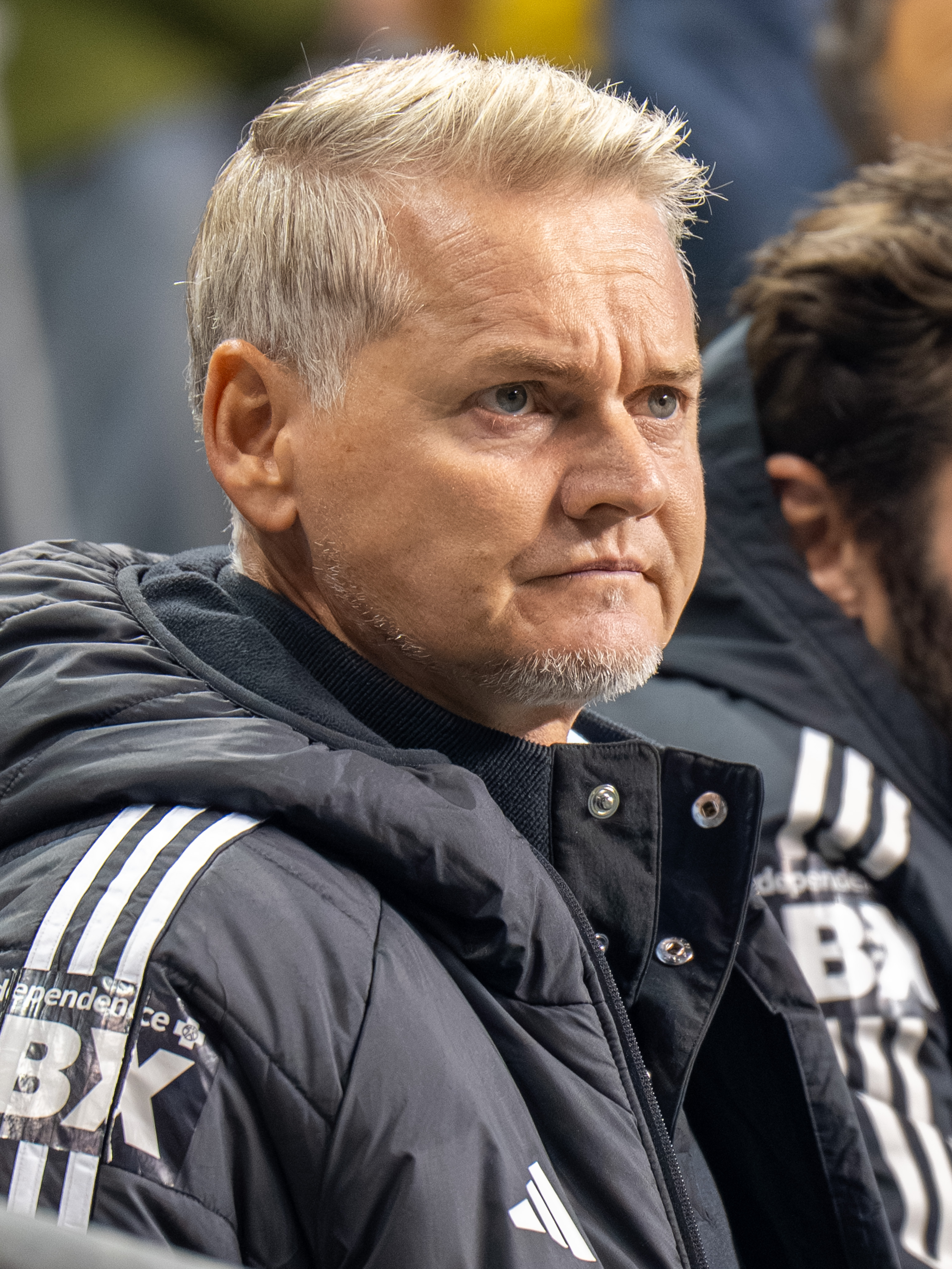
- Carnell coaching the Philadelphia Union in 2025

Personal information
- Full name: Bradley Neil Carnell
- Date of birth: 21 January 1977 (age 49)
- Place of birth: Johannesburg, South Africa
- Height: 1.74 m (5 ft 9 in)
- Position: Defender

Youth career
- Southern Suburbs
- Robertsham Callies

Senior career*
Years	Team	Apps	(Gls)
1993–1997	Wits University	59	(7)
1997–1998	Kaizer Chiefs	13	(0)
1998–2003	VfB Stuttgart	82	(3)
2003–2005	Borussia Mönchengladbach	24	(1)
2005–2009	Karlsruher SC	93	(8)
2009–2010	Hansa Rostock	19	(0)
2010	Hansa Rostock II	1	(0)
2010–2011	Supersport United	12	(0)
Total		303	(19)

International career^{‡}
1993–1994	South Africa U-20	6	(0)
1997–2010	South Africa	42	(0)

Managerial career
- 2017–2021: New York Red Bulls (assistant)
- 2020: New York Red Bulls (interim)
- 2022–2024: St. Louis City
- 2024: Canada (assistant)
- 2025–2026: Philadelphia Union
- * Club domestic league appearances and goals as of 23 May 2011 ‡ National team caps and goals as of 7 April 2010

Bradley Neil Carnell (born 21 January 1977) is a South African soccer coach and former player who played as a defender. He was most recently the head coach of Major League Soccer club Philadelphia Union.

== Early career ==
Born in Johannesburg, Carnell attended Parktown Boys' High School in Johannesburg. The old Parktown boy played for Southern Suburbs and Robertsham Callies juniors as a goalkeeper and he was later converted to a defender. He was regularly selected to play at district levels being coached by former Southampton, Hereford United and Cheltenham Town winger and former Wits University manager Terry Paine.

== Playing career ==
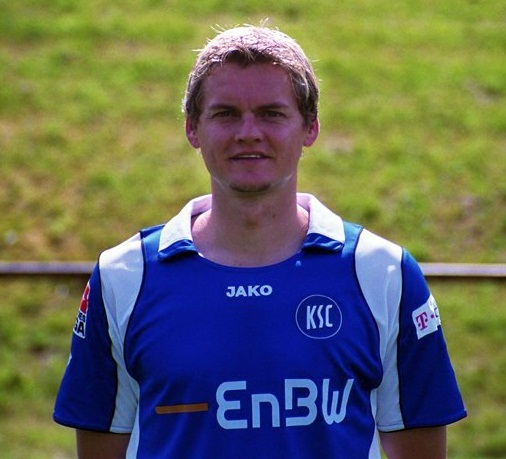
Carnell with Karlsruher SC in 2007.

Carnell made his professional debut at the age of 16 in 1993 playing for Wits University. While still a student, he scored twice in Wit's 2–0 win over Kaizer Chiefs in the final of the 1995 BP Top 8.

He played for Kaizer Chiefs (1997–98), VfB Stuttgart (1998–2003) and Borussia Mönchengladbach (2003–05). His greatest success came at Stuttgart where he helped win the league silver in 2003. He was selected for the 2002 FIFA World Cup.

According to media reports, he was involved in an on-field altercation with a fellow player (goalkeeper Markus Miller) during a German league match in Frankfurt during September 2007.

In July 2009 he moved to F.C. Hansa Rostock. On 13 July 2010, he signed for SuperSport United F.C.

He announced his retirement from soccer on 27 August 2011.

== Coaching ==
On 28 March 2017, Carnell was announced as the new assistant coach of the New York Red Bulls of Major League Soccer. On 5 September 2020, a day after the firing of Chris Armas, he was named interim head coach for the remainder of the 2020 regular season.

On 5 January 2022, Carnell was announced as the first head coach of St. Louis City SC of Major League Soccer. In the franchise's first season in MLS, Carnell led the team to a conference-best 56 points, as St. Louis City SC became the first expansion team to win their conference in their inaugural season, as well as setting an expansion-team record with 17 wins; after the season, Carnell was a finalist for the Sigi Schmid Coach of the Year Award. On July 1, 2024, Carnell was fired by St. Louis City SC amid a disappointing second season.

Carnell was named an assistant coach for Canada men's national soccer team for its September 2024 International Series in the United States, which featured friendlies against Mexico and the United States.

On 2 January 2025, Carnell was named head coach of the Philadelphia Union. Carnell lead the team to a Supporters' Shield crest and was named the Sigi Schmid MLS Coach of the Year.

On 27 May 2026, Carnell was relieved of his duties after the Union's league-worst 1-4-10 start.

== Managerial statistics ==
As of match played 24 May 2026

Managerial record by team and tenure
Team	From	To	Record				
Team	From	To	G	W	D	L	Win %
New York Red Bulls (interim)	5 September 2020	19 November 2020	14	6	3	5	42.86
St Louis City SC	5 January 2022	1 July 2024	62	22	15	25	35.48
Philadelphia Union	2 January 2025	27 May 2026	60	28	11	21	46.67
Total			134	53	31	50	39.55

== Honours ==
=== Player ===
VfB Stuttgart

- UEFA Intertoto Cup: 2000, 2002

=== Manager ===
Philadelphia Union

- Supporters' Shield: 2025

Individual

- MLS Coach of the Year: 2025
