= All-time Philadelphia Union roster =

These lists comprises all players who have participated in at least one competitive match (MLS regular season, MLS Cup Playoffs, U.S. Open Cup, MLS is Back Tournament, CONCACAF Champions Cup, Leagues Cup) for the Philadelphia Union since the team's first Major League Soccer season in 2010. Players who were on the roster but never played a first team game are not listed.

== Regular season players ==
Major League Soccer clubs are allowed a roster of 30 players at any one time during the MLS season.

All statistics are for the MLS regular season games only, and are correct through October 28, 2026.

=== Outfield players ===
| Name | Position | Country | Years | Games | Minutes | Goals | Assists |
|---|---|---|---|---|---|---|---|
| Brenden Aaronson | MF | USA | 2019–2020 | 51 | 3,635 | 7 | 9 |
| Paxten Aaronson | MF | USA | 2021–2022 | 37 | 1,006 | 4 | 0 |
| David Accam | MF | Ghana | 2018–2019 | 31 | 1,550 | 5 | 2 |
| Samuel Adeniran | FW | USA | 2024 | 7 | 130 | 0 | 1 |
| Freddy Adu | MF | USA | 2011–2013 | 35 | 2,077 | 7 | 2 |
| Roland Alberg | MF | Netherlands | 2016–2017 | 52 | 2,024 | 16 | 4 |
| Chris Albright | DF | USA | 2012–2013 | 10 | 250 | 0 | 0 |
| Ezekiel Alladoh | FW | Ghana | 2026– | 26 | 816 | 1 | 1 |
| Markus Anderson | FW | USA | 2024– | 6 | 190 | 1 | 0 |
| Don Anding | DF | USA | 2013 | 1 | 30 | 0 | 0 |
| Agustin Anello | FW | USA | 2026– | 17 | 471 | 1 | 1 |
| Fernando Aristeguieta | FW | Venezuela | 2015 | 21 | 1,251 | 5 | 1 |
| Cristian Arrieta | DF | Puerto Rico | 2010 | 16 | 1,343 | 0 | 0 |
| Eric Ayuk | MF | Cameroon | 2015–2018 | 29 | 1,410 | 2 | 2 |
| Tai Baribo | FW | Israel | 2023–2025 | 55 | 3,413 | 25 | 5 |
| Tranquillo Barnetta | MF | Switzerland | 2015–2016 | 40 | 3,076 | 6 | 7 |
| Alejandro Bedoya | MF | USA | 2016– | 287 | 20,353 | 25 | 45 |
| Ben Bender | MF | USA | 2025– | 19 | 885 | 1 | 2 |
| Austin Berry | DF | USA | 2014–2015 | 6 | 497 | 0 | 1 |
| Corben Bone | MF | USA | 2014 | 2 | 12 | 0 | 0 |
| Brian Brown | FW | Jamaica | 2014 | 8 | 230 | 2 | 1 |
| Jesús Bueno | MF | Venezuela | 2021– | 88 | 3,445 | 5 | 3 |
| Cory Burke | FW | Jamaica | 2018–2022 | 93 | 4,150 | 25 | 8 |
| Danny Califf | DF | USA | 2010–2012 | 65 | 5,894 | 1 | 1 |
| Julián Carranza | FW | Argentina | 2022–2024 | 74 | 5,790 | 34 | 15 |
| Brian Carroll | MF | USA | 2011–2017 | 166 | 13,864 | 5 | 3 |
| Conor Casey | FW | USA | 2013–2015 | 70 | 3,975 | 21 | 7 |
| Aurélien Collin | DF | France | 2019–2021 | 6 | 530 | 0 | 0 |
| Anderson Conceição | DF | Brazil | 2016 | 1 | 90 | 0 | 0 |
| Eduardo Coudet | MF | Argentina | 2010 | 9 | 631 | 0 | 0 |
| Brandan Craig | DF | USA | 2022–2024 | 1 | 3 | 0 | 0 |
| Warren Creavalle | DF | Guyana | 2015–2020 | 86 | 3,945 | 0 | 5 |
| Danny Cruz | MF | USA | 2012–2015 | 70 | 4,441 | 7 | 5 |
| Bruno Damiani | FW | Uruguay | 2025– | 64 | 4,463 | 19 | 5 |
| Keon Daniel | MF | Trinidad | 2011–2014 | 64 | 4,126 | 2 | 4 |
| Charlie Davies | FW | USA | 2016–2017 | 11 | 105 | 0 | 1 |
| Eddy Davis III | FW | USA | 2025– | 1 | 2 | 0 | 0 |
| Jack de Vries | FW | Belgium | 2020–2022 | 4 | 13 | 0 | 0 |
| Borek Dockal | MF | Czech Republic | 2018 | 31 | 2,397 | 5 | 18 |
| Chris Donovan | FW | USA | 2022–2025 | 62 | 1,396 | 2 | 3 |
| Maurice Edu | MF | USA | 2014–2017 | 53 | 4,769 | 4 | 3 |
| Jack Elliott | DF | England | 2017–2024 | 223 | 19,107 | 10 | 9 |
| Marcus Epps | MF | USA | 2017–2018 | 32 | 1,318 | 3 | 3 |
| Marco Fabian | MF | Mexico | 2019 | 23 | 1,249 | 7 | 1 |
| Fabinho | DF | Brazil | 2013–2019 | 121 | 9,945 | 2 | 15 |
| Gabriel Farfan | MF | USA | 2011–2013 | 51 | 3,882 | 1 | 3 |
| Michael Farfan | MF | USA | 2011–2013 | 82 | 6,253 | 4 | 9 |
| Leo Fernandes | MF | USA | 2013–2016 | 32 | 1,234 | 2 | 2 |
| Stuart Findlay | DF | Scotland | 2021–2022 | 11 | 734 | 0 | 0 |
| Leon Flach | MF | USA | 2021–2024 | 116 | 9,029 | 2 | 10 |
| Anthony Fontana | MF | USA | 2018–2021 | 42 | 1,077 | 8 | 2 |
| Fred | MF | Brazil | 2010, 2014–2015 | 42 | 2,339 | 5 | 1 |
| Ray Gaddis | DF | USA | 2012–2020 | 221 | 18,702 | 0 | 10 |
| Dániel Gazdag | MF | Hungary | 2021–2025 | 125 | 10,008 | 59 | 32 |
| Ian Glavinovich | DF | Argentina | 2025 | 4 | 257 | 1 | 0 |
| Jakob Glesnes | DF | Norway | 2020–2025 | 181 | 15,939 | 9 | 10 |
| Gabriel Gómez | MF | Panama | 2012 | 24 | 1,578 | 6 | 0 |
| Juan Diego González | DF | Colombia | 2010–2011 | 7 | 630 | 0 | 0 |
| Jordan Griffin | DF | USA | 2026– | 1 | 1 | 0 | 0 |
| Nathan Harriel | DF | USA | 2021– | 141 | 10,939 | 7 | 10 |
| Jordan Harvey | DF | USA | 2010–2011 | 46 | 3,861 | 1 | 2 |
| Fabian Herbers | FW | Germany | 2016–2018 | 53 | 2,113 | 4 | 9 |
| Kai Herdling | MF | Germany | 2012 | 4 | 212 | 0 | 0 |
| Cristhian Hernández | FW | Mexico | 2012–2014 | 2 | 26 | 0 | 0 |
| Chandler Hoffman | FW | USA | 2012 | 7 | 204 | 0 | 0 |
| Antoine Hoppenot | FW | USA | 2012–2015 | 69 | 1,757 | 7 | 3 |
| Milan Iloski | FW | USA | 2025– | 40 | 3,143 | 21 | 12 |
| Ilsinho | MF | Brazil | 2016–2021 | 130 | 5,904 | 22 | 20 |
| Andrew Jacobson | MF | USA | 2010 | 25 | 1,294 | 0 | 0 |
| Danley Jean Jacques | MF | Haiti | 2024– | 68 | 5,290 | 7 | 8 |
| Malik Jakupovic | FW | USA | 2026– | 12 | 156 | 1 | 0 |
| Derrick Jones | MF | USA | 2017–2019 | 26 | 1,144 | 0 | 0 |
| Matt Kassel | MF | USA | 2013 | 5 | 90 | 0 | 0 |
| Kléberson | MF | Brazil | 2013 | 11 | 532 | 1 | 2 |
| Stas Korzeniowski | FW | USA | 2026– | 6 | 136 | 0 | 1 |
| Michael Lahoud | MF | Sierra Leone | 2012–2016 | 58 | 3,681 | 0 | 1 |
| Morgan Langley | MF | USA | 2011 | 1 | 10 | 0 | 0 |
| Raymond Lee | DF | USA | 2015 | 1 | 12 | 0 | 0 |
| Sébastien Le Toux | FW | France | 2010–2011, 2013–2016 | 175 | 13,437 | 50 | 50 |
| Porfirio López | DF | Costa Rica | 2012 | 5 | 327 | 0 | 0 |
| Damion Lowe | DF | Jamaica | 2023–2024 | 28 | 2,191 | 2 | 0 |
| Jovan Lukić | MF | Serbia | 2025– | 62 | 4,913 | 2 | 8 |
| Cristian Maidana | MF | Argentina | 2014–2015 | 54 | 4,010 | 3 | 26 |
| Olwethu Makhanya | DF | South Africa | 2023–2026 | 42 | 3,314 | 1 | 0 |
| Justin Mapp | MF | USA | 2010–2011 | 44 | 2,716 | 4 | 8 |
| Richie Marquez | DF | USA | 2015–2018 | 69 | 6,036 | 3 | 0 |
| Geiner Martinez | DF | Colombia | 2026– | 7 | 458 | 0 | 0 |
| Josué Martínez | FW | Costa Rica | 2012 | 18 | 594 | 1 | 0 |
| José Martinez | MF | Venezuela | 2020–2024 | 108 | 8,477 | 3 | 12 |
| Olivier Mbaizo | DF | Cameroon | 2018–2026 | 122 | 8,621 | 0 | 13 |
| Jack McGlynn | MF | USA | 2021–2024 | 99 | 5,569 | 7 | 13 |
| Jack McInerney | FW | USA | 2010–2014 | 95 | 5,059 | 25 | 4 |
| Mark McKenzie | DF | USA | 2018–2020 | 48 | 4,146 | 2 | 3 |
| Jimmy McLaughlin | MF | USA | 2012–2015 | 3 | 19 | 0 | 0 |
| Haris Medunjanin | MF | BIH | 2017–2019 | 98 | 8,647 | 5 | 29 |
| Stefani Miglioranzi | MF | Brazil | 2010–2011 | 43 | 3,077 | 0 | 0 |
| Jamiro Monteiro | MF | Cape Verde | 2019–2021 | 75 | 6,288 | 9 | 21 |
| Alejandro Moreno | FW | Venezuela | 2010 | 26 | 1,974 | 2 | 7 |
| Danny Mwanga | FW | DR Congo | 2010–2012 | 61 | 3,454 | 12 | 9 |
| David Myrie | DF | Costa Rica | 2010 | 1 | 78 | 0 | 0 |
| Adam Najem | MF | Afghanistan | 2017–2018 | 5 | 153 | 0 | 0 |
| Kyle Nakazawa | MF | USA | 2010–2011 | 36 | 2,006 | 1 | 2 |
| Philippe Ndinga | DF | Republic of the Congo | 2025– | 6 | 220 | 0 | 0 |
| Michee Ngalina | FW | DR Congo | 2018–2020 | 1 | 9 | 0 | 0 |
| Vincent Nogueira | MF | France | 2014–2016 | 64 | 5,175 | 9 | 3 |
| Amobi Okugo | MF | USA | 2010–2014 | 117 | 9,155 | 5 | 6 |
| Sal Olivas | FW | Mexico | 2025– | 4 | 52 | 0 | 0 |
| CJ Olney | MF | USA | 2024– | 1 | 18 | 0 | 0 |
| Oguchi Onyewu | DF | USA | 2017 | 22 | 1,929 | 1 | 0 |
| Michael Orozco | DF | USA | 2010 | 29 | 2,562 | 2 | 0 |
| Lionard Pajoy | FW | Colombia | 2012 | 20 | 1,489 | 5 | 2 |
| Jeff Parke | DF | USA | 2013 | 31 | 2,744 | 0 | 1 |
| Veljko Paunović | FW | Serbia | 2011 | 17 | 1,236 | 3 | 3 |
| Andrés Perea | MF | USA | 2023 | 8 | 146 | 1 | 0 |
| Jorge Perlaza | FW | Colombia | 2012 | 2 | 72 | 0 | 0 |
| Zach Pfeffer | MF | USA | 2011–2015 | 30 | 1,226 | 3 | 1 |
| Fafà Picault | MF | USA | 2017–2019 | 89 | 5,950 | 21 | 12 |
| Neil Pierre | DF | USA | 2025– | 17 | 1,400 | 5 | 1 |
| Chris Pontius | MF | USA | 2016–2017 | 63 | 4,824 | 14 | 12 |
| Alvas Powell | DF | Jamaica | 2021 | 5 | 313 | 0 | 0 |
| Kacper Przybylko | FW | Poland | 2018–2021 | 83 | 6,870 | 35 | 14 |
| Jeremy Rafanello | MF | USA | 2022– | 32 | 809 | 0 | 1 |
| Matthew Real | DF | USA | 2018–2024 | 50 | 1,736 | 2 | 4 |
| Walter Restrepo | MF | Colombia | 2016 | 4 | 81 | 0 | 1 |
| Pedro Ribeiro | FW | Brazil | 2014 | 9 | 350 | 2 | 0 |
| Keegan Rosenberry | DF | USA | 2016–2018 | 80 | 6,884 | 3 | 6 |
| Carlos Ruiz | FW | Guatemala | 2011 | 14 | 1,144 | 6 | 0 |
| Shea Salinas | MF | USA | 2010 | 17 | 795 | 1 | 0 |
| Sergio Santos | FW | Brazil | 2019–2022 | 75 | 3,816 | 19 | 7 |
| C.J. Sapong | FW | USA | 2015–2018 | 123 | 9,547 | 36 | 14 |
| Giovanny Sequera | DF | Venezuela | 2026– | 1 | 82 | 0 | 0 |
| Japhet Sery Larsen | DF | Denmark | 2026– | 15 | 952 | 1 | 0 |
| Jay Simpson | FW | England | 2017–2018 | 30 | 630 | 3 | 0 |
| Bakary Soumaré | DF | Mali | 2012–2013 | 4 | 351 | 0 | 0 |
| Toni Ståhl | DF | Finland | 2010 | 1 | 41 | 0 | 0 |
| Cavan Sullivan | MF | USA | 2024– | 41 | 1,933 | 7 | 14 |
| Quinn Sullivan | MF | USA | 2021– | 139 | 6,551 | 13 | 29 |
| Finn Sundstrum | DF | USA | 2026– | 2 | 52 | 0 | 0 |
| Shavar Thomas | DF | Jamaica | 2010 | 1 | 35 | 0 | 0 |
| Joaquín Torres | MF | Argentina | 2023–2024 | 13 | 345 | 1 | 1 |
| Roger Torres | MF | Colombia | 2010–2013 | 61 | 2,138 | 3 | 10 |
| Ken Tribbett | DF | USA | 2016–2017 | 23 | 1,729 | 2 | 1 |
| Auston Trusty | DF | USA | 2018–2019 | 56 | 5,026 | 2 | 1 |
| Cole Turner | MF | USA | 2020–2022 | 2 | 9 | 0 | 0 |
| Mikael Uhre | FW | Denmark | 2022–2025 | 119 | 7,133 | 38 | 23 |
| Carlos Valdés | DF | Colombia | 2011–2015 | 73 | 6,510 | 3 | 1 |
| Indiana Vassilev | MF | USA | 2025– | 62 | 4,002 | 9 | 10 |
| David Vazquez | DF | USA | 2025 | 1 | 19 | 0 | 0 |
| Steven Vitória | DF | Canada | 2015 | 18 | 1,575 | 1 | 0 |
| Kai Wagner | DF | Germany | 2019–2025, 2026– | 221 | 19,315 | 8 | 69 |
| Andrew Wenger | FW | USA | 2014–2015 | 54 | 3,558 | 7 | 6 |
| Frankie Westfield | DF | USA | 2025– | 52 | 3,988 | 1 | 16 |
| Aaron Wheeler | FW | USA | 2013–2014 | 25 | 888 | 1 | 1 |
| Ethan White | DF | USA | 2014–2015 | 28 | 2,266 | 0 | 0 |
| Giliano Wijnaldum | DF | Netherlands | 2017 | 13 | 1,138 | 0 | 1 |
| Sheanon Williams | DF | USA | 2010–2015 | 141 | 12,261 | 7 | 19 |
| Andrew Wooten | FW | USA | 2019–2020 | 23 | 798 | 0 | 5 |
| Joshua Yaro | DF | Ghana | 2016–2018 | 23 | 1,696 | 0 | 0 |
| Nick Zimmerman | MF | USA | 2010 | 8 | 159 | 0 | 0 |

=== Goalkeepers ===
| Name | Country | Years | Games | Minutes | Conceded | Shutouts |
|---|---|---|---|---|---|---|
| Joe Bendik | USA | 2020–2023 | 13 | 989 | 18 | 1 |
| Andre Blake | Jamaica | 2014– | 296 | 26,422 | 357 | 91 |
| Carlos Miguel Coronel | Brazil | 2019 | 4 | 319 | 2 | 1 |
| Matt Freese | USA | 2019–2022 | 13 | 1,034 | 15 | 1 |
| Chase Harrison | USA | 2012 | 1 | 90 | 1 | 0 |
| Matt Jones | England | 2016 | 1 | 90 | 2 | 0 |
| Brad Knighton | USA | 2010 | 8 | 652 | 8 | 2 |
| Chris Konopka | USA | 2012–2013 | 1 | 90 | 1 | 0 |
| Zac MacMath | USA | 2011–2015 | 103 | 9,225 | 138 | 28 |
| John McCarthy | USA | 2015–2018 | 21 | 1,890 | 34 | 4 |
| Raïs M'Bolhi | Algeria | 2014–2015 | 9 | 810 | 13 | 2 |
| Faryd Mondragón | Colombia | 2011 | 27 | 2,385 | 28 | 7 |
| Andrew Rick | USA | 2024– | 22 | 1,952 | 36 | 7 |
| Chris Seitz | USA | 2010 | 23 | 2,047 | 41 | 0 |
| Oliver Semmle | Germany | 2024–2025 | 17 | 1,412 | 29 | 4 |
| Brian Sylvestre | Haiti | 2015 | 12 | 1,080 | 18 | 5 |

== MLS Cup Playoffs players ==
All statistics are for the MLS Cup Playoff games only, and are correct through November 23, 2025.

=== Outfield players ===
| Name | Position | Country | Years | Games | Minutes | Goals | Assists |
|---|---|---|---|---|---|---|---|
| Brenden Aaronson | MF | USA | 2019–2020 | 3 | 186 | 0 | 0 |
| Paxten Aaronson | MF | USA | 2021–2022 | 3 | 98 | 0 | 0 |
| Freddy Adu | MF | USA | 2011–13 | 2 | 37 | 0 | 0 |
| Roland Alberg | MF | Netherlands | 2016–2017 | 1 | 20 | 0 | 0 |
| Tai Baribo | FW | Israel | 2023–2025 | 3 | 235 | 2 | 1 |
| Tranquillo Barnetta | MF | Switzerland | 2015–2016 | 1 | 90 | 0 | 0 |
| Alejandro Bedoya | MF | USA | 2016– | 12 | 1,014 | 2 | 0 |
| Jesús Bueno | MF | Venezuela | 2021– | 5 | 72 | 0 | 0 |
| Cory Burke | FW | Jamaica | 2018–2022 | 7 | 265 | 2 | 0 |
| Danny Califf | DF | USA | 2010–12 | 2 | 180 | 0 | 0 |
| Julián Carranza | FW | Argentina | 2022–2024 | 5 | 452 | 1 | 1 |
| Brian Carroll | MF | USA | 2011–2017 | 2 | 180 | 0 | 0 |
| Aurélien Collin | DF | France | 2019–2021 | 1 | 90 | 0 | 0 |
| Warren Creavalle | DF | Guyana | 2015–2020 | 3 | 143 | 0 | 0 |
| Bruno Damiani | FW | Uruguay | 2025– | 3 | 265 | 1 | 0 |
| Charlie Davies | FW | USA | 2016–2017 | 1 | 6 | 0 | 0 |
| Borek Dockal | MF | Czech Republic | 2018 | 1 | 90 | 0 | 0 |
| Chris Donovan | FW | USA | 2022–2025 | 5 | 43 | 1 | 0 |
| Jack Elliott | DF | England | 2017–2024 | 11 | 1,048 | 3 | 0 |
| Marco Fabian | MF | Mexico | 2019 | 2 | 41 | 1 | 0 |
| Fabinho | DF | Brazil | 2013–2019 | 1 | 90 | 0 | 0 |
| Gabriel Farfan | MF | USA | 2011–13 | 2 | 156 | 0 | 0 |
| Michael Farfan | MF | USA | 2011–13 | 2 | 180 | 0 | 1 |
| Stuart Findlay | DF | Scotland | 2021–2022 | 1 | 90 | 0 | 0 |
| Leon Flach | MF | USA | 2021–2024 | 8 | 553 | 1 | 0 |
| Anthony Fontana | MF | USA | 2018–2021 | 2 | 15 | 0 | 0 |
| Ray Gaddis | DF | USA | 2012–2020 | 4 | 376 | 0 | 0 |
| Daniel Gazdag | MF | Hungary | 2021–2025 | 9 | 900 | 4 | 0 |
| Jakob Glesnes | DF | Norway | 2020–2025 | 9 | 900 | 1 | 1 |
| Nathan Harriel | DF | USA | 2021– | 8 | 614 | 1 | 0 |
| Fabian Herbers | FW | Germany | 2016–2018 | 1 | 59 | 0 | 0 |
| Milan Iloski | FW | USA | 2025– | 3 | 248 | 1 | 2 |
| Ilsinho | MF | Brazil | 2016–2021 | 5 | 217 | 0 | 2 |
| Danley Jean Jacques | MF | Haiti | 2024– | 3 | 263 | 0 | 0 |
| Derrick Jones | MF | USA | 2017–2019 | 1 | 8 | 0 | 0 |
| Sébastien Le Toux | FW | France | 2010–11, 2013–16 | 2 | 180 | 1 | 0 |
| Damion Lowe | DF | Jamaica | 2023–2024 | 3 | 270 | 0 | 0 |
| Jovan Lukić | MF | Serbia | 2025– | 3 | 232 | 0 | 1 |
| Olwethu Makhanya | DF | South Africa | 2023–2026 | 3 | 270 | 0 | 0 |
| Justin Mapp | MF | USA | 2010–11 | 2 | 92 | 0 | 0 |
| Richie Marquez | DF | USA | 2015–2018 | 1 | 90 | 0 | 1 |
| José Martinez | MF | Venezuela | 2020–2024 | 10 | 912 | 0 | 1 |
| Olivier Mbaizo | DF | Cameroon | 2018–2026 | 6 | 570 | 0 | 0 |
| Jack McGlynn | MF | USA | 2021–2024 | 9 | 587 | 0 | 2 |
| Jack McInerney | FW | USA | 2010–14 | 2 | 118 | 0 | 0 |
| Mark McKenzie | DF | USA | 2018–2020 | 4 | 390 | 0 | 0 |
| Haris Medunjanin | MF | BIH | 2017–2019 | 3 | 300 | 0 | 1 |
| Stefani Miglioranzi | MF | Brazil | 2010–11 | 1 | 62 | 0 | 0 |
| Jamiro Monteiro | MF | Cape Verde | 2019–2021 | 5 | 495 | 0 | 0 |
| Danny Mwanga | FW | DR Congo | 2010–12 | 2 | 156 | 0 | 0 |
| Veljko Paunović | FW | Serbia | 2011 | 1 | 66 | 0 | 0 |
| Fafà Picault | MF | USA | 2017–2019 | 3 | 228 | 1 | 1 |
| Chris Pontius | MF | USA | 2016–2017 | 1 | 90 | 0 | 0 |
| Alvas Powell | DF | Jamaica | 2021 | 2 | 229 | 0 | 0 |
| Kacper Przybylko | FW | Poland | 2018–2021 | 4 | 371 | 0 | 0 |
| Matthew Real | DF | USA | 2018–2024 | 1 | 4 | 0 | 0 |
| Keegan Rosenberry | DF | USA | 2016–2018 | 2 | 155 | 0 | 0 |
| Sergio Santos | FW | Brazil | 2019–2022 | 5 | 353 | 0 | 1 |
| C.J. Sapong | FW | USA | 2015–2018 | 2 | 89 | 0 | 0 |
| Cavan Sullivan | MF | USA | 2024– | 2 | 15 | 0 | 0 |
| Quinn Sullivan | MF | USA | 2021– | 3 | 111 | 0 | 0 |
| Joaquín Torres | MF | Argentina | 2023–2024 | 1 | 23 | 0 | 0 |
| Roger Torres | MF | Colombia | 2010–13 | 2 | 46 | 0 | 0 |
| Ken Tribbett | DF | USA | 2016–2017 | 1 | 90 | 0 | 0 |
| Auston Trusty | DF | USA | 2018–2019 | 1 | 90 | 0 | 0 |
| Mikael Uhre | FW | Denmark | 2022–2025 | 8 | 490 | 1 | 2 |
| Carlos Valdés | DF | Colombia | 2011–15 | 2 | 180 | 0 | 0 |
| Indiana Vassilev | MF | USA | 2025– | 3 | 173 | 1 | 0 |
| Kai Wagner | DF | Germany | 2019–2025, 2026– | 12 | 1,192 | 0 | 3 |
| Frankie Westfield | DF | USA | 2025– | 3 | 146 | 0 | 0 |
| Sheanon Williams | DF | USA | 2010–15 | 2 | 180 | 0 | 0 |
| Andrew Wooten | FW | USA | 2019–2020 | 2 | 70 | 0 | 0 |

=== Goalkeepers ===
| Name | Country | Years | Games | Minutes | Conceded | Shutouts |
|---|---|---|---|---|---|---|
| Andre Blake | Jamaica | 2014– | 16 | 1,530 | 23 | 4 |
| Matt Freese | USA | 2019–2022 | 1 | 90 | 2 | 0 |
| Faryd Mondragon | Colombia | 2011 | 2 | 180 | 3 | 0 |
| Andrew Rick | USA | 2024– | 1 | 30 | 0 | 0 |

== MLS Is Back Tournament Playoffs players ==
All statistics are for the MLS Is Back Tournament Playoff games only, and are correct through August 5, 2020.

=== Outfield players ===
| Name | Position | Country | Years | Games | Minutes | Goals | Assists |
|---|---|---|---|---|---|---|---|
| Brenden Aaronson | MF | USA | 2019–2020 | 3 | 259 | 0 | 1 |
| Alejandro Bedoya | MF | USA | 2016– | 3 | 270 | 0 | 1 |
| Warren Creavalle | DF | Guyana | 2015–2020 | 1 | 7 | 0 | 0 |
| Jack Elliott | DF | England | 2017–2024 | 3 | 270 | 0 | 0 |
| Anthony Fontana | MF | USA | 2018–2021 | 1 | 4 | 0 | 0 |
| Ray Gaddis | DF | USA | 2012–2020 | 3 | 270 | 0 | 0 |
| Ilsinho | MF | Brazil | 2016–2021 | 3 | 94 | 0 | 0 |
| José Martinez | MF | Venezuela | 2020–2024 | 3 | 252 | 0 | 0 |
| Mark McKenzie | DF | USA | 2018–2020 | 3 | 270 | 0 | 0 |
| Jamiro Monteiro | MF | Cape Verde | 2019–2021 | 3 | 266 | 1 | 1 |
| Kacper Przybylko | FW | Poland | 2018–2021 | 3 | 248 | 0 | 0 |
| Matthew Real | DF | USA | 2018–2024 | 1 | 4 | 0 | 0 |
| Sergio Santos | FW | Brazil | 2019–2022 | 3 | 176 | 3 | 1 |
| Kai Wagner | DF | Germany | 2019–2025, 2026– | 3 | 270 | 0 | 0 |
| Andrew Wooten | FW | USA | 2019–2020 | 3 | 40 | 1 | 0 |

=== Goalkeepers ===
| Name | Country | Years | Games | Minutes | Conceded | Shutouts |
|---|---|---|---|---|---|---|
| Andre Blake | Jamaica | 2014– | 3 | 270 | 2 | 1 |

== CONCACAF Champions League / Cup players ==
All statistics are for the CONCACAF Champions League / Cup games only, and are correct through March 18, 2026.

=== Outfield players ===
| Name | Position | Country | Years | Games | Minutes | Goals | Assists |
|---|---|---|---|---|---|---|---|
| Paxten Aaronson | MF | USA | 2021–2022 | 1 | 14 | 0 | 0 |
| Ezekiel Alladoh | FW | Ghana | 2026– | 3 | 200 | 1 | 3 |
| Markus Anderson | FW | USA | 2024– | 4 | 83 | 0 | 0 |
| Agustin Anello | FW | USA | 2026– | 1 | 63 | 0 | 0 |
| Alejandro Bedoya | MF | USA | 2016– | 18 | 1,346 | 0 | 1 |
| Ben Bender | MF | USA | 2025– | 1 | 45 | 1 | 0 |
| Jesús Bueno | MF | Venezuela | 2021– | 10 | 512 | 1 | 1 |
| Cory Burke | FW | Jamaica | 2018–2022 | 4 | 180 | 0 | 1 |
| Julián Carranza | FW | Argentina | 2022–2024 | 9 | 672 | 6 | 0 |
| Aurélien Collin | DF | France | 2019–2021 | 1 | 1 | 0 | 0 |
| Bruno Damiani | FW | Uruguay | 2025– | 3 | 115 | 2 | 0 |
| Chris Donovan | FW | USA | 2022–2025 | 4 | 136 | 0 | 0 |
| Jack Elliott | DF | England | 2017–2024 | 12 | 1,010 | 0 | 0 |
| Stuart Findlay | DF | Scotland | 2021–2022 | 1 | 23 | 0 | 0 |
| Leon Flach | MF | USA | 2021–2024 | 10 | 615 | 0 | 1 |
| Anthony Fontana | MF | USA | 2018–2021 | 4 | 259 | 2 | 0 |
| Daniel Gazdag | MF | Hungary | 2021–2025 | 12 | 887 | 3 | 2 |
| Jakob Glesnes | DF | Norway | 2020–2025 | 15 | 1,379 | 0 | 0 |
| Nathan Harriel | DF | USA | 2021– | 12 | 844 | 0 | 0 |
| Milan Iloski | FW | USA | 2025– | 3 | 245 | 1 | 1 |
| Ilsinho | MF | Brazil | 2016–2021 | 1 | 6 | 0 | 0 |
| Danley Jean Jacques | MF | Haiti | 2024– | 3 | 144 | 0 | 0 |
| Malik Jakupovic | FW | USA | 2026– | 2 | 49 | 0 | 0 |
| Stas Korzeniowski | FW | USA | 2026– | 3 | 194 | 2 | 0 |
| Damion Lowe | DF | Jamaica | 2023–2024 | 6 | 481 | 1 | 0 |
| Jovan Lukić | MF | Serbia | 2025– | 3 | 225 | 1 | 0 |
| Olwethu Makhanya | DF | South Africa | 2023–2026 | 4 | 298 | 1 | 0 |
| Geiner Martínez | DF | Colombia | 2026– | 3 | 198 | 1 | 0 |
| José Martinez | MF | Venezuela | 2020–2024 | 14 | 1,034 | 0 | 0 |
| Olivier Mbaizo | DF | Cameroon | 2018–2026 | 14 | 1,078 | 0 | 1 |
| Jack McGlynn | MF | USA | 2021–2024 | 12 | 812 | 0 | 2 |
| Jamiro Monteiro | MF | Cape Verde | 2019–2021 | 5 | 436 | 2 | 2 |
| Philippe Ndinga | DF | Republic of the Congo | 2025– | 2 | 90 | 0 | 0 |
| Sal Olivas | FW | Mexico | 2025– | 1 | 45 | 0 | 1 |
| Andrés Perea | MF | USA | 2023 | 2 | 112 | 2 | 0 |
| Alvas Powell | DF | Jamaica | 2021 | 1 | 56 | 0 | 0 |
| Kacper Przybylko | FW | Poland | 2018–2021 | 6 | 515 | 5 | 1 |
| Jeremy Rafanello | MF | USA | 2022– | 3 | 181 | 0 | 0 |
| Matthew Real | DF | USA | 2018–2024 | 4 | 72 | 0 | 0 |
| Sergio Santos | FW | Brazil | 2019–2022 | 4 | 220 | 0 | 3 |
| Giovanny Sequera | DF | Venezuela | 2026– | 1 | 90 | 0 | 0 |
| Japhet Sery Larsen | DF | Denmark | 2026– | 3 | 115 | 0 | 0 |
| Cavan Sullivan | MF | USA | 2024– | 4 | 223 | 2 | 3 |
| Quinn Sullivan | MF | USA | 2021– | 13 | 470 | 1 | 2 |
| Finn Sundstrum | DF | USA | 2026– | 1 | 17 | 0 | 0 |
| Joaquín Torres | MF | Argentina | 2023–2024 | 4 | 190 | 0 | 0 |
| Mikael Uhre | FW | Denmark | 2022–2025 | 9 | 554 | 1 | 1 |
| Indiana Vassilev | MF | USA | 2025– | 3 | 107 | 0 | 0 |
| Kai Wagner | DF | Germany | 2019–2025, 2026– | 15 | 1,335 | 0 | 2 |
| Frankie Westfield | DF | USA | 2025– | 3 | 172 | 0 | 2 |

=== Goalkeepers ===
| Name | Country | Years | Games | Minutes | Conceded | Shutouts |
|---|---|---|---|---|---|---|
| Joe Bendik | USA | 2020–2023 | 1 | 90 | 0 | 1 |
| Andre Blake | Jamaica | 2014– | 14 | 1,260 | 19 | 6 |
| Oliver Semmle | Germany | 2024–2025 | 1 | 120 | 3 | 0 |
| Andrew Rick | USA | 2024– | 4 | 360 | 2 | 2 |

== Leagues Cup players ==
All statistics are for the Leagues Cup games only, and are correct through August 13, 2026.

=== Outfield players ===
| Name | Position | Country | Years | Games | Minutes | Goals | Assists |
|---|---|---|---|---|---|---|---|
| Samuel Adeniran | FW | USA | 2024 | 7 | 210 | 0 | 0 |
| Ezekiel Alladoh | FW | Ghana | 2026– | 3 | 216 | 0 | 0 |
| Agustin Anello | FW | USA | 2026– | 2 | 87 | 0 | 0 |
| Tai Baribo | FW | Israel | 2022–2025 | 7 | 495 | 7 | 0 |
| Alejandro Bedoya | MF | USA | 2016– | 10 | 467 | 2 | 0 |
| Ben Bender | MF | USA | 2025– | 1 | 90 | 0 | 0 |
| Jesús Bueno | MF | Venezuela | 2021– | 15 | 826 | 2 | 3 |
| Julián Carranza | FW | Argentina | 2022–2024 | 5 | 425 | 2 | 0 |
| Bruno Damiani | FW | Uruguay | 2025– | 2 | 97 | 1 | 0 |
| Chris Donovan | FW | USA | 2022–2025 | 5 | 155 | 1 | 0 |
| Jack Elliott | DF | England | 2017–2024 | 14 | 1,260 | 0 | 1 |
| Leon Flach | MF | USA | 2021–2024 | 9 | 436 | 0 | 0 |
| Daniel Gazdag | MF | Hungary | 2021–2025 | 13 | 1,077 | 6 | 2 |
| Jakob Glesnes | DF | Norway | 2020–2025 | 14 | 1,135 | 0 | 0 |
| Nathan Harriel | DF | USA | 2021– | 11 | 772 | 3 | 1 |
| Milan Iloski | FW | USA | 2025– | 2 | 120 | 0 | 0 |
| Danley Jean Jacques | MF | Haiti | 2024– | 4 | 202 | 0 | 0 |
| Malik Jakupovic | FW | USA | 2026– | 2 | 48 | 0 | 0 |
| Stas Korzeniowski | FW | USA | 2026– | 1 | 59 | 0 | 0 |
| Kellan LeBlanc | MF | USA | 2026– | 1 | 14 | 0 | 0 |
| Damion Lowe | DF | Jamaica | 2023–2024 | 8 | 508 | 0 | 0 |
| Jovan Lukić | MF | Serbia | 2025– | 2 | 101 | 0 | 0 |
| Geiner Martínez | DF | Colombia | 2026– | 1 | 66 | 0 | 0 |
| José Martinez | MF | Venezuela | 2020–2024 | 12 | 955 | 0 | 0 |
| Olivier Mbaizo | DF | Cameroon | 2018–2026 | 10 | 649 | 0 | 0 |
| Jack McGlynn | MF | USA | 2021–2024 | 12 | 686 | 1 | 3 |
| Neil Pierre | DF | USA | 2025– | 2 | 101 | 0 | 0 |
| Jeremy Rafanello | MF | USA | 2022– | 3 | 92 | 0 | 0 |
| Matthew Real | DF | USA | 2018–2024 | 2 | 36 | 0 | 0 |
| Japhet Sery Larsen | DF | Denmark | 2026– | 3 | 259 | 0 | 0 |
| Cavan Sullivan | MF | USA | 2024– | 2 | 150 | 1 | 1 |
| Quinn Sullivan | MF | USA | 2021– | 15 | 872 | 1 | 1 |
| Finn Sundstrum | DF | USA | 2026– | 1 | 24 | 0 | 0 |
| Joaquín Torres | MF | Argentina | 2023–2024 | 4 | 32 | 0 | 1 |
| Mikael Uhre | FW | Denmark | 2022–2025 | 14 | 798 | 3 | 0 |
| Indiana Vassilev | MF | USA | 2025– | 2 | 114 | 0 | 1 |
| Rafael Uzcátegui | DF | Venezuela | 2026– | 1 | 90 | 0 | 0 |
| Kai Wagner | DF | Germany | 2019–2025, 2026– | 16 | 1,410 | 0 | 3 |
| Frankie Westfield | DF | USA | 2025– | 2 | 120 | 0 | 0 |

=== Goalkeepers ===
| Name | Country | Years | Games | Minutes | Conceded | Shutouts |
|---|---|---|---|---|---|---|
| Andre Blake | Jamaica | 2014– | 14 | 1,260 | 17 | 4 |
| Andrew Rick | USA | 2024– | 3 | 270 | 4 | 0 |

== U.S. Open Cup players ==
All statistics are for the U.S. Open Cup games only, and are correct through September 16, 2025.

=== Outfield players ===
| Name | Position | Country | Years | Games | Minutes | Goals | Assists |
|---|---|---|---|---|---|---|---|
| Paxten Aaronson | MF | USA | 2021–2022 | 1 | 90 | 0 | 0 |
| David Accam | MF | Ghana | 2018–2019 | 5 | 218 | 1 | 0 |
| Freddy Adu | MF | USA | 2011–2013 | 4 | 351 | 3 | 2 |
| Roland Alberg | MF | Netherlands | 2016–2017 | 5 | 442 | 3 | 0 |
| Don Anding | DF | USA | 2013 | 1 | 18 | 0 | 0 |
| Fernando Aristeguieta | FW | Venezuela | 2015 | 1 | 30 | 0 | 0 |
| Eric Ayuk | MF | Cameroon | 2015–2018 | 4 | 256 | 2 | 0 |
| Tai Baribo | FW | Israel | 2023–2025 | 3 | 245 | 1 | 1 |
| Tranquillo Barnetta | MF | Switzerland | 2015–2016 | 4 | 357 | 0 | 0 |
| Alejandro Bedoya | MF | USA | 2016– | 7 | 601 | 2 | 4 |
| Ben Bender | MF | USA | 2025– | 1 | 25 | 0 | 0 |
| Brian Brown | FW | Jamaica | 2014 | 1 | 57 | 0 | 0 |
| Jesús Bueno | MF | Venezuela | 2021– | 4 | 247 | 0 | 0 |
| Cory Burke | FW | Jamaica | 2018–2022 | 6 | 408 | 3 | 1 |
| Julián Carranza | FW | Argentina | 2022–2024 | 2 | 73 | 0 | 1 |
| Brian Carroll | MF | USA | 2011–2017 | 14 | 1,180 | 2 | 0 |
| Conor Casey | FW | USA | 2013–2015 | 7 | 439 | 1 | 0 |
| Aurélien Collin | DF | France | 2019–2021 | 1 | 120 | 0 | 0 |
| Warren Creavalle | DF | Guyana | 2015–2020 | 5 | 313 | 0 | 0 |
| Danny Cruz | MF | USA | 2012–2015 | 6 | 295 | 0 | 0 |
| Bruno Damiani | FW | Uruguay | 2025– | 4 | 255 | 1 | 1 |
| Keon Daniel | MF | Trinidad | 2011–2014 | 3 | 230 | 0 | 0 |
| Borek Dockal | MF | Czech Republic | 2018 | 4 | 334 | 0 | 1 |
| Chris Donovan | FW | USA | 2022–2025 | 1 | 102 | 1 | 0 |
| Maurice Edu | MF | USA | 2014–2017 | 10 | 1,110 | 2 | 0 |
| Jack Elliott | DF | England | 2017–2024 | 7 | 645 | 1 | 1 |
| Marcus Epps | MF | USA | 2017–2018 | 5 | 249 | 2 | 0 |
| Fabinho | DF | Brazil | 2013–2019 | 12 | 1,193 | 1 | 0 |
| Gabriel Farfan | MF | USA | 2011–2013 | 4 | 370 | 0 | 1 |
| Michael Farfan | MF | USA | 2011–2013 | 6 | 463 | 0 | 0 |
| Leo Fernandes | MF | USA | 2013–2016 | 7 | 336 | 0 | 0 |
| Stuart Findlay | DF | Scotland | 2021–2022 | 1 | 90 | 1 | 0 |
| Leon Flach | MF | USA | 2021–2024 | 2 | 94 | 0 | 0 |
| Anthony Fontana | MF | USA | 2018–2021 | 2 | 94 | 1 | 0 |
| Fred | MF | Brazil | 2010, 2014–2015 | 4 | 91 | 0 | 0 |
| Ray Gaddis | DF | USA | 2012–2020 | 21 | 1,980 | 0 | 0 |
| Daniel Gazdag | MF | Hungary | 2021–2025 | 2 | 117 | 0 | 0 |
| Jakob Glesnes | DF | Norway | 2020–2025 | 5 | 361 | 0 | 0 |
| Gabriel Gómez | MF | Panama | 2012 | 2 | 43 | 1 | 0 |
| Nathan Harriel | DF | USA | 2021– | 4 | 225 | 0 | 0 |
| Fabian Herbers | FW | Germany | 2016–2018 | 3 | 141 | 1 | 2 |
| Kai Herdling | MF | Germany | 2012 | 2 | 35 | 0 | 0 |
| Chandler Hoffman | FW | USA | 2012 | 2 | 50 | 0 | 0 |
| Antoine Hoppenot | FW | USA | 2012–2015 | 6 | 170 | 1 | 0 |
| Milan Iloski | FW | USA | 2025– | 2 | 107 | 1 | 0 |
| Ilsinho | MF | Brazil | 2016–2021 | 5 | 433 | 0 | 2 |
| Danley Jean Jacques | MF | Haiti | 2024– | 3 | 247 | 1 | 0 |
| Derrick Jones | MF | USA | 2017–2019 | 5 | 264 | 1 | 1 |
| Michael Lahoud | MF | Sierra Leone | 2012–2016 | 9 | 759 | 0 | 0 |
| Sébastien Le Toux | FW | France | 2010–2011, 2013–2016 | 14 | 1,117 | 5 | 7 |
| Porfirio López | DF | Costa Rica | 2012 | 1 | 90 | 0 | 0 |
| Damion Lowe | DF | Jamaica | 2023–2024 | 1 | 120 | 0 | 0 |
| Jovan Lukić | MF | Serbia | 2025– | 4 | 253 | 1 | 0 |
| Cristian Maidana | MF | Argentina | 2014–2015 | 10 | 911 | 0 | 3 |
| Olwethu Makhanya | DF | South Africa | 2023–2026 | 4 | 390 | 1 | 0 |
| Richie Marquez | DF | USA | 2015–2018 | 7 | 720 | 0 | 0 |
| Josué Martínez | FW | Costa Rica | 2012 | 2 | 160 | 1 | 1 |
| José Martinez | MF | Venezuela | 2020–2024 | 1 | 29 | 0 | 1 |
| Olivier Mbaizo | DF | Cameroon | 2018–2026 | 4 | 359 | 0 | 1 |
| Jack McGlynn | MF | USA | 2021–2024 | 2 | 177 | 0 | 0 |
| Jack McInerney | FW | USA | 2010–2014 | 4 | 351 | 3 | 0 |
| Mark McKenzie | DF | USA | 2018–2020 | 4 | 390 | 0 | 0 |
| Jimmy McLaughlin | MF | USA | 2012–2015 | 3 | 59 | 0 | 0 |
| Haris Medunjanin | MF | BIH | 2017–2019 | 8 | 779 | 1 | 3 |
| Jamiro Monteiro | MF | Cape Verde | 2019–2021 | 1 | 120 | 0 | 1 |
| Adam Najem | MF | Afghanistan | 2017–2018 | 1 | 38 | 0 | 0 |
| Michee Ngalina | FW | DR Congo | 2018–2020 | 1 | 28 | 0 | 0 |
| Vincent Nogueira | MF | France | 2014–2016 | 8 | 844 | 0 | 2 |
| Amobi Okugo | MF | USA | 2010–2014 | 9 | 900 | 1 | 0 |
| Sal Olivas | FW | Mexico | 2025– | 1 | 4 | 0 | 0 |
| Lionard Pajoy | FW | Colombia | 2012 | 4 | 357 | 2 | 0 |
| Jeff Parke | DF | USA | 2013 | 2 | 180 | 0 | 0 |
| Andrés Perea | MF | USA | 2023 | 1 | 75 | 0 | 0 |
| Zach Pfeffer | MF | USA | 2011–2015 | 2 | 130 | 0 | 0 |
| Fafà Picault | MF | USA | 2017–2019 | 7 | 598 | 0 | 1 |
| Chris Pontius | MF | USA | 2016–2017 | 4 | 197 | 2 | 0 |
| Jeremy Rafanello | MF | USA | 2022– | 3 | 142 | 0 | 0 |
| Matthew Real | DF | USA | 2018–2024 | 4 | 316 | 0 | 0 |
| Walter Restrepo | MF | Colombia | 2016 | 2 | 101 | 1 | 0 |
| Pedro Ribeiro | FW | Brazil | 2014 | 1 | 42 | 0 | 0 |
| Keegan Rosenberry | DF | USA | 2016–2018 | 8 | 750 | 0 | 0 |
| Sergio Santos | FW | Brazil | 2019–2022 | 2 | 137 | 0 | 0 |
| C.J. Sapong | FW | USA | 2015–2018 | 10 | 790 | 2 | 0 |
| Jay Simpson | FW | England | 2017–2018 | 4 | 218 | 1 | 2 |
| Cavan Sullivan | MF | USA | 2024– | 3 | 211 | 0 | 0 |
| Quinn Sullivan | MF | USA | 2021– | 4 | 296 | 1 | 1 |
| Joaquín Torres | MF | Argentina | 2023–2024 | 1 | 120 | 0 | 1 |
| Ken Tribbett | DF | USA | 2016–2017 | 2 | 210 | 0 | 0 |
| Auston Trusty | DF | USA | 2018–2019 | 5 | 367 | 0 | 0 |
| Mikael Uhre | FW | Denmark | 2022–2025 | 5 | 257 | 0 | 0 |
| Carlos Valdés | DF | Colombia | 2011–2015 | 3 | 330 | 0 | 0 |
| Indiana Vassilev | MF | USA | 2025– | 4 | 236 | 1 | 1 |
| David Vazquez | DF | USA | 2025 | 1 | 57 | 0 | 0 |
| Kai Wagner | DF | Germany | 2019–2025, 2026– | 5 | 290 | 2 | 1 |
| Andrew Wenger | FW | USA | 2014–2015 | 8 | 527 | 2 | 1 |
| Frankie Westfield | DF | USA | 2025– | 3 | 239 | 0 | 0 |
| Aaron Wheeler | FW | USA | 2013–2014 | 1 | 29 | 0 | 0 |
| Ethan White | DF | USA | 2014–2015 | 3 | 360 | 0 | 0 |
| Giliano Wijnaldum | DF | Netherlands | 2017 | 1 | 82 | 0 | 0 |
| Sheanon Williams | DF | USA | 2010–2015 | 11 | 1,065 | 0 | 1 |
| Joshua Yaro | DF | Ghana | 2016–2018 | 3 | 300 | 0 | 0 |
| Zach Zandi | MF | USA | 2019 | 1 | 20 | 0 | 0 |

=== Goalkeepers ===
| Name | Country | Years | Games | Minutes | Conceded | Shutouts |
|---|---|---|---|---|---|---|
| Andre Blake | Jamaica | 2014– | 11 | 1,140 | 14 | 2 |
| Matt Freese | USA | 2019–2022 | 2 | 210 | 4 | 0 |
| Chris Konopka | USA | 2012–2013 | 1 | 90 | 0 | 1 |
| Zac MacMath | USA | 2011–2015 | 8 | 810 | 13 | 1 |
| John McCarthy | USA | 2015–2018 | 8 | 780 | 6 | 3 |
| Andrew Rick | USA | 2024– | 3 | 300 | 5 | 0 |

== Sources ==
https://www.philadelphiaunion.com/stats
