= 2026 Philadelphia Union season =

Philadelphia Union 2026 soccer season

Philadelphia Union
2026 season
- Sporting director: Jon Scheer
- Head coach: Bradley Carnell (until May 27); Ryan Richter (interim, from May 27)
- Stadium: Subaru Park (Capacity: 18,500)
- MLS: Conference: 6th Overall: 11th
- MLS Cup playoffs: Round one
- CONCACAF Champions Cup: Round of 16
- Leagues Cup: League phase
Home colors	Away colors	Third colors

The 2026 Philadelphia Union season is the club's seventeenth season in Major League Soccer, the top flight of American soccer. The team was managed by Bradley Carnell, his second season with the club, until May 27, 2026. He was replaced by Ryan Richter on an interim basis.

The Union began their preseason in Marbella, Spain on January 17. They had a second training camp in Clearwater, Florida. The club's season began on February 18, 2026, opening with a win against Defence Force in the 2026 CONCACAF Champions Cup. The club earned its berth by winning the 2025 Supporters' Shield. The club also played in the 2026 Leagues Cup.

== Current roster ==
As of August 28, 2026

Note: Flags indicate national team as defined under FIFA eligibility rules; some limited exceptions apply. Players may hold more than one non-FIFA nationality.

No.	Pos.	Nation	Player
2	DF	COL	Geiner Martínez
4	MF	SRB	Jovan Lukić
5	DF	DEN	Japhet Sery Larsen
6	MF	USA	Cavan Sullivan (HG)
8	MF	VEN	Jesús Bueno
9	FW	URU	Bruno Damiani
10	FW	USA	Milan Iloski
11	MF	USA	Alejandro Bedoya
14	MF	USA	Jeremy Rafanello (HG)
16	MF	USA	Ben Bender
18	GK	JAM	Andre Blake
19	MF	USA	Indiana Vassilev
20	DF	CGO	Philippe Ndinga

No.	Pos.	Nation	Player
21	MF	HAI	Danley Jean Jacques
23	FW	GHA	Ezekiel Alladoh
26	DF	USA	Nathan Harriel (HG)
27	DF	GER	Kai Wagner
28	FW	USA	Agustin Anello
31	GK	USA	George Marks
33	MF	USA	Quinn Sullivan (HG)
39	DF	USA	Frankie Westfield (HG)
44	DF	USA	Neil Pierre (HG)
51	FW	USA	Malik Jakupović (HG)
55	FW	MEX	Sal Olivas (HG)
66	DF	USA	Finn Sundstrum
76	GK	USA	Andrew Rick (HG)

=== Players out on loan ===
Note: Flags indicate national team as defined under FIFA eligibility rules; some limited exceptions apply. Players may hold more than one non-FIFA nationality.

No.	Pos.	Nation	Player
17	MF	USA	CJ Olney (HG; on loan to Brooklyn FC)
35	FW	USA	Markus Anderson (on loan to Lyngby)
37	FW	USA	Stas Korzeniowski (on loan to Rhode Island FC)
77	FW	USA	Eddy Davis III (HG; on loan to Loudoun United)

== Transfers ==
=== In ===
Date	No.	Pos.	Player	Transferred from	Fee/notes	Source
December 3, 2025	23	FW	(Ghana) Ezekiel Alladoh	(Sweden) IF Brommapojkarna	$4,500,000; U-22	
December 30, 2025	66	DF	(United States) Finn Sundstrom	(United States) North Carolina FC (via D.C. United)	2028 1st Round SuperDraft pick	
January 13, 2026	5	DF	(Denmark) Japhet Sery Larsen	(Norway) SK Brann		
February 3, 2026	2	DF	(Colombia) Geiner Martínez	(Uruguay) CA Juventud	~$950,000	
February 10, 2026	28	FW	(United States) Agustin Anello	(Uruguay) Boston River	$2,500,000	
February 27, 2026	20	DF	(Republic of the Congo) Philippe Ndinga	(Sweden) Degerfors IF	$1,000,000; U-22	
July 17, 2026	27	DF	(Germany) Kai Wagner	(England) Birmingham City	$4,000,000	

=== Out ===
Date	No.	Pos.	Player	Transferred to	Fee/notes	Source
November 26, 2025	25	FW	(United States) Chris Donovan	(United States) Louisville City FC	Declined Contract Option	
November 26, 2025	12	DF	(United States) Isaiah LeFlore	(United States) Nashville SC	Declined Contract Option	
November 26, 2025	24	MF	(United States) Nick Pariano		Declined Contract Option	
November 26, 2025	1	GK	(Germany) Oliver Semmle	(United States) Lexington SC	Declined Contract Option	
December 15, 2025	5	DF	(Norway) Jakob Glesnes	(United States) LA Galaxy	$500,000 2026 GAM $600,000 2027 GAM $1,100,000 conditional GAM	
December 17, 2025	9	FW	(Israel) Tai Baribo	(United States) D.C. United	$4,000,000 additional $600,000 (conditional)	
January 2, 2026	27	DF	(Germany) Kai Wagner	(England) Birmingham City	$2,700,000	
July 30, 2026	29	DF	(South Africa) Olwethu Makhanya	(Scotland) Rangers F.C.	$4,500,000	

== Non-competitive ==
=== Pre-season ===
The pre-season schedule was released with matches in Marbella, Spain and Clearwater, Florida on January 16, 2026.

January 20	Sigma Olomouc	1–1	Philadelphia Union	Marbella, Spain
9:00 a.m. EST	Kostadinov 73'	Report	Korzeniowski 9'	Stadium: Marbella Football Center

January 23	FC Nordsjælland	2–1	Philadelphia Union	Marbella, Spain
8:00 a.m. EST	Lind 22'; Junior 44'	Report	Makhanya 129'	Stadium: Marbella Football Center

January 29	FK Budućnost	0–4	Philadelphia Union	Marbella, Spain
8:00 a.m. EST		Report	Makhanya 33'; Damiani 54'; Iloski 62'; Bender 93'	Stadium: Marbella Football Center

February 7	Tampa Bay Rowdies	0–2	Philadelphia Union	St. Petersburg, Florida
6:00 p.m. EST		Report	Bedoya 70'; Jean Jacques 78'	Stadium: Al Lang Stadium

February 10	CF Montréal	4–2	Philadelphia Union	Clearwater, Florida
6:00 p.m. EST	Ríos 45' (pen.); Carmona 49'; Escobar 66'; Morales (red card) 67'; Owusu 85'	Report	Iloski 28', 38'	Stadium: Joe DiMaggio Sports Complex

== Competitive ==
=== Major League Soccer ===
==== Standings ====
===== Eastern Conference =====
MLS Eastern Conference table (2026)
Pos	Team	Pld	W	L	T	GF	GA	GD	Pts	Qualification
4	Chicago Fire FC	34	16	11	7	64	54	+10	55	Qualification for round one
5	Charlotte FC	34	15	10	9	66	51	+15	54	Qualification for round one
6	Philadelphia Union	34	14	12	8	66	52	+14	50	Qualification for round one
7	Columbus Crew	34	14	15	5	59	52	+7	47	Qualification for round one
8	Orlando City SC	34	13	14	7	63	78	−15	46	Qualification for the wild card round

Source: MLS
Rules for classification: 1) points; 2) total wins; 3) total goal differential; 4) total goals scored; 5) fewer disciplinary points; 6) away goal differential; 7) away goals scored; 8) home goals differential; 9) home goals scored; 10) coin toss (2 clubs tied) or drawing of lots (≥3 clubs tied)

===== Overall =====
Overall MLS standings table
Pos	Team	Pld	W	L	T	GF	GA	GD	Pts
9	San Jose Earthquakes	34	14	10	10	57	51	+6	52
10	Houston Dynamo FC	34	14	11	9	43	43	0	51
11	Philadelphia Union	34	14	12	8	66	52	+14	50
12	Columbus Crew	34	14	15	5	59	52	+7	47
13	Los Angeles FC	34	12	11	11	52	40	+12	47

Source: MLS
Rules for classification: 1) points; 2) total wins; 3) total goal differential; 4) total goals scored; 5) fewer disciplinary points; 6) away goal differential; 7) away goals scored; 8) home goals differential; 9) home goals scored; 10) coin toss (2 clubs tied) or drawing of lots (≥3 clubs tied)

==== Match results ====
February 21 1	D.C. United	1–0	Philadelphia Union	Washington, D.C.
7:30 p.m. EST	Baribo 23'; Hopkins (yellow card) 89'; Peglow (yellow card) 90+4'	Report	Makhanya (yellow card) 41'; Bueno (yellow card) 45'; Alladoh (red card) 59'; Sery Larsen (yellow card) 80'; Jean Jacques (yellow card) 88'	Stadium: Audi Field; Attendance: 18,003; Referee: Guido Gonzales Jr.

March 1 2	Philadelphia Union	1–2	New York City FC	Chester, Pennsylvania
4:30 p.m. EST	Makhanya (yellow card) 23' (yellow-red card) 90+2'; Vassilev 89' (pen.); Sery Larsen (yellow card) 90+5'	Report	Gray (yellow card) 20', (goal) 90+9'; Wolf 36'; O'Neill (yellow card) 39'	Stadium: Subaru Park; Attendance: 18,513; Referee: Chris Penso

March 7 3	Philadelphia Union	0–1	San Jose Earthquakes	Chester, Pennsylvania
7:30 p.m. EST	Lukić (yellow card) 20'; Harriel (yellow card) 65'; Alladoh (yellow card) 88'	Report	Kikanović (yellow card) 15'; Bouda 59'; Judd (yellow card) 75'	Stadium: Subaru Park; Attendance: 17,410; Referee: Armando Villarreal

March 14 4	Atlanta United FC	3–1	Philadelphia Union	Atlanta, Georgia
3:00 p.m. EDT	Latte Lath 28'; Báez (yellow card) 41'; Gregersen (yellow card) 45+2'; Jacob 47', (yellow card) 85'; Galarza (yellow card) 49'; Miranchuk 68'	Report	Anello 87'	Stadium: Mercedes-Benz Stadium; Attendance: 35,308; Referee: Marcos de Oliveira

March 21 5	Philadelphia Union	1–2	Chicago Fire FC	Chester, Pennsylvania
4:30 p.m. EDT	Ndinga (yellow card) 37'; Iloski 45+7'	Report	Lod (yellow card) 8'; D'Avilla (yellow card) 23'; Cuypers 45+3'; Bamba 58'; Radojević (yellow card) 87'	Stadium: Subaru Park; Attendance: 18,753; Referee: Nabil Bensalah

April 4 6	Charlotte FC	2–1	Philadelphia Union	Charlotte, North Carolina
7:30 p.m. EDT	Diani (yellow card) 19'; Westwood 30'; Zaha (yellow card) 42', (goal) 80'; Agyemang (yellow card) 83'; Kahlina (yellow card) 87'	Report	Westfield (yellow card) 12'; Damiani (yellow card) 45+2'; Harriel (yellow card) 76'; Jean Jacques 78'; C. Sullivan (yellow card) 90+1'	Stadium: Bank of America Stadium; Attendance: 25,865; Referee: Drew Fischer

April 11 7	CF Montréal	1–2	Philadelphia Union	Montreal, Quebec
2:30 p.m. EDT	Gillier (yellow card) 22'; Jaime 23'; Owusu (yellow card) 37'; Loturi (yellow card) 43'	Report	Sery Larsen (yellow card) 45+6', (goal) 55'; Makhanya (yellow card) 59'; Bueno 70'; Damiani (yellow card) 85'; Lukić (yellow card) 90+6'	Stadium: Saputo Stadium; Attendance: 14,028; Referee: Alexis Da Silva

April 18 8	Philadelphia Union	0–0	D.C. United	Chester, Pennsylvania
7:30 p.m. EDT		Report	Baribo (yellow card) 35'; Peglow (yellow card) 37'; Markovic (yellow card) 60'	Stadium: Subaru Park; Attendance: 18,529; Referee: Lorenzo Hernandez

April 22 9	Toronto FC	3–3	Philadelphia Union	Toronto, Ontario
7:30 p.m. EDT	Osorio (yellow card) 7'; Sallói (yellow card) 16'; Coello (yellow card) 46'; Laryea (yellow card) 49'; Sargent 56'; Franklin 64'; Gavran 90+6'	Report	Iloski 45+4'; Jean Jacques 52', (yellow card) 65'; Sery Larsen (yellow card) 61'; Makhanya (yellow card) 78'; Harriel 89'; Bedoya (yellow card) 90+3'	Stadium: BMO Field; Attendance: 15,461; Referee: Fotis Bazakos

April 25 10	Columbus Crew	2–0	Philadelphia Union	Columbus, Ohio
7:30 p.m. EDT	Arfsten 4'; Bangoura (yellow card) 45'; Harriel 45+3' (o.g.)	Report	Jean Jacques (yellow card) 39'; Sery Larsen (red card) 90+5'	Stadium: ScottsMiracle-Gro Field; Attendance: 19,903; Referee: Filip Dujic

May 2 11	Philadelphia Union	0–0	Nashville SC	Chester, Pennsylvania
7:30 p.m. EDT	Martínez (yellow card) 64'	Report	Lovitz (yellow card) 90+1'	Stadium: Subaru Park; Attendance: 17,430; Referee: Elijio Arreguin

May 9 12	New England Revolution	2–1	Philadelphia Union	Foxborough, Massachusetts
7:30 p.m. EDT	Langoni 61'; Gil 87'	Report	Lukić (yellow card) 34'; Sands 37' (o.g.); Vassilev (yellow card) 45+2'; Anello (yellow card) 85'	Stadium: Gillette Stadium; Attendance: 18,561; Referee: Tori Penso

May 13 13	Orlando City SC	4–3	Philadelphia Union	Orlando, Florida
7:30 p.m. EDT	M. Ojeda 19' (pen.), 90'; Dorsey 27'; Tiago (yellow card) 51'; McGuire 72'	Report	Rick (yellow card) 17'; Iloski 54'; Jean Jacques (yellow card) 59'; Rafanello (yellow card) 60'; C. Sullivan 75'; Bender 79'	Stadium: Inter&Co Stadium; Attendance: 15,656; Referee: Serhiy Boyko

May 16 14	Philadelphia Union	1–1	Columbus Crew	Chester, Pennsylvania
7:30 p.m. EDT	Bender (yellow card) 9'; Iloski (yellow card) 26', (goal) 70'; Makhanya (yellow card) 45+1'	Report	Picard 10'; Camacho (yellow card) 30'	Stadium: Subaru Park; Attendance: 17,505; Referee: Armando Villarreal

May 24 15	Inter Miami CF	6–4	Philadelphia Union	Miami, Florida
7:00 p.m. EDT	St. Clair (yellow card) 9'; Berterame 13', 42'; Suárez 29', 44', 81'; Fray (yellow card) 38'; Segovia (yellow card) 45+11'; Reguilón (yellow card) 49'; Luján (yellow card) 90+3'; De Paul 90+3'; Allen (yellow card) 90+7'	Report	Iloski 4', 10' (pen.), 45+8' (pen.); Martínez (yellow card) 16'; Damiani 20'; Lukić (yellow card) 24'; Jean Jacques (yellow card) 75'	Stadium: Nu Stadium; Attendance: 26,649; Referee: Rosendo Mendoza

July 22 16	Philadelphia Union	3–1	New York Red Bulls	Chester, Pennsylvania
7:30 p.m. EDT	Iloski 10'; Vassilev 57'; Pierre 66'	Report	Cowell 38'; Donkor (yellow card) 77'; Valencia (yellow card) 85'; Berggren (yellow card) 88'	Stadium: Subaru Park; Attendance: 18,533; Referee: Fotis Bazakos

July 25 17	Philadelphia Union	1–0	Seattle Sounders FC	Chester, Pennsylvania
7:30 p.m. EDT	Iloski 31'	Report	Dotson (yellow card) 12'	Stadium: Subaru Park; Attendance: 18,520; Referee: Timothy Ford

August 1 18	Philadelphia Union	3–2	Atlanta United FC	Chester, Pennsylvania
7:30 p.m. EDT	Iloski (yellow card) 28', (goal) 73'; Harriel (yellow card) 53'; Damiani (yellow card) 68'; Pierre 90+6'; Alladoh 90+7'	Report	Mihaj (red card) 26'; Almirón 30'; Hoyos (yellow card) 59'; Muyumba 66'; Báez (yellow card) 90+2'	Stadium: Subaru Park; Attendance: 18,557; Referee: Allen Chapman

August 16 19	New York City FC	2–3	Philadelphia Union	New York, New York
6:30 p.m. EDT	Traoré 4' (pen.); Luighi (yellow card) 43', (goal) 45+2' (pen.); Gray (yellow card) 79'; Jones (yellow card) 90'	Report	Harriel (yellow card) 16'; Lukić (yellow card) 44'; Jean Jacques 48'; Iloski (yellow card) 50'; Damiani 69', 75'; Wagner (yellow card) 86'	Stadium: Yankee Stadium; Attendance: 20,034; Referee: Sergii Demianchuk

August 19 20	Philadelphia Union	2–2	Inter Miami CF	Chester, Pennsylvania
7:30 p.m. EDT	Vassilev 11'; Wagner (yellow card) 43'; Pierre 58'; Iloski (yellow card) 87'; Alladoh (yellow card) 90+5'; C. Sullivan (red card) 90+12'; Q. Sullivan (yellow card) 90+13'	Report	Pintér 21'; Messi 26'; Reguilón (yellow card) 50'; Fray (yellow card) 55'; Bright (red card) 90+12'	Stadium: Subaru Park; Attendance: 19,778; Referee: Filip Dujic

August 22 21	Austin FC	1–1	Philadelphia Union	Austin, Texas
9:00 p.m. EDT	Hines-Ike 21'; Torres (yellow card) 90+6'	Report	C. Sullivan 18'; Bueno (yellow card) 38'; Pierre (yellow card) 42'	Stadium: Q2 Stadium; Attendance: 20,738; Referee: Rodrigo Albuquerque

August 29 22	New York Red Bulls	1–3	Philadelphia Union	Harrison, New Jersey
7:30 p.m. EDT	Choupo-Moting 74'; Donkor (yellow card) 79'	Report	Iloski 20'; C. Sullivan 50'; Pierre 64'; Anello (yellow card) 90+1'; Q. Sullivan (yellow card) 90+2'	Stadium: Sports Illustrated Stadium; Attendance: 20,008; Referee: Drew Fischer

September 5 23	Philadelphia Union	2–0	CF Montréal	Chester, Pennsylvania
7:30 p.m. EDT	Lukić (yellow card) 6'; Damiani (yellow card) 24'; Jacques 57'; Wagner (yellow card) 68'; C. Sullivan 75'; Bueno (yellow card) 90'	Report	Synchuk (yellow card) 14'; Piette (yellow card) 29'; Bugaj (yellow card) 56'; Owusu (penalty missed) 68'; Loturi (yellow card) 73'	Stadium: Subaru Park; Attendance: 18,774; Referee: Chris Penso

September 9 24	Philadelphia Union	5–0	FC Cincinnati	Chester, Pennsylvania
7:30 p.m. EDT	Q. Sullivan 43' (pen.); Damiani 45+1', 49', 61'; Iloski 89' (pen.)	Report	Nwobodo (red card) 16'; Evander (yellow card) 40'; Anunga (yellow card) 87'	Stadium: Subaru Park; Attendance: 17,784; Referee: Joe Dickerson

September 13 25	San Diego FC	0–5	Philadelphia Union	San Diego, California
9:00 p.m. EDT	Alvarado Jr. (yellow card) 45+2'; Verhoeven (yellow card) 90+1'	Report	Damiani (yellow card) 27', (goal) 67'; C. Sullivan 45+5', 61'; Pierre (yellow card) 45+7'; Godoy 87' (o.g.); Jakupovic 90+4'	Stadium: Snapdragon Stadium; Attendance: 21,171; Referee: Ismail Elfath

September 19 26	Sporting Kansas City	3–4	Philadelphia Union	Kansas City, Kansas
8:30 p.m. EDT	Luiz 5', 10'; Meyer 16'; Agyabeng (yellow card) 45'; Johnsen (yellow card) 53'; Bassong (yellow card) 90+7'	Report	Bueno (yellow card) 45+7'; Damiani 64'; C. Sullivan 66', (yellow card) 70'; Iloski 68'; Bassong 73' (o.g.); Wagner (yellow card) 79'; Jacques (yellow card) 90+6'	Stadium: Sporting Park; Attendance: 14,534; Referee: Katja Koroleva

September 26 27	Philadelphia Union	4–2	Orlando City SC	Chester, Pennsylvania
7:30 p.m. EDT	Iloski 11' (pen.), 19', 51'; Vassilev 47'; Q. Sullivan (yellow card) 63'; Sery Larsen (yellow card) 77'	Report	Atuesta (yellow card) 11'; Iago (yellow card) 37'; Gerbet (yellow card) 43'; Angulo 78', (yellow card) 84'; M. Ojeda 90'	Stadium: Subaru Park; Attendance: 18,504; Referee: Sergii Demianchuk

October 10 28	Philadelphia Union	2–1	Real Salt Lake	Chester, Pennsylvania
7:30 p.m. EDT	Jacques (yellow card) 3'; Westfield (yellow card) 23'; Damiani 31', (yellow card) 90'; Bueno (yellow card) 80'; Iloski 83'	Report	Yedlin (yellow card) 13'; Marczuk (yellow card) 62'; Lobjanidze 90+7'	Stadium: Subaru Park; Attendance: 18,886; Referee: Elijio Arreguin

October 14 29	Chicago Fire FC	1–3	Philadelphia Union	Chicago, Illinois
8:30 p.m. EDT	Mbokazi (yellow card) 34'; Elliott (yellow card) 41' (yellow-red card) 45+1'; Haile-Selassie 44'; Zinckernagel (yellow card) 88'	Report	Iloski 49'; Damiani 55', 67'; Vassilev (yellow card) 85'; Pierre (yellow card) 90+3'	Stadium: Soldier Field; Attendance: 21,265; Referee: Ricardo Fierro

October 17 30	Philadelphia Union	2–2	Charlotte FC	Chester, Pennsylvania
2:30 p.m. EDT	Iloski 24' (pen.); Damiani 73'	Report	Saint-Maximin (yellow card) 19'; Agyemang (yellow card) 44'; Schnegg (yellow card) 45+1'; Aloko 48'; Toklomati 62'	Stadium: Subaru Park; Attendance: 18,551; Referee: Jon Freemon

October 24 31	Philadelphia Union	1–2	New England Revolution	Chester, Pennsylvania
7:30 p.m. EDT	Damiani (yellow card) 61'; Lukić (yellow card) 63'; Pierre 90+12'	Report	Turgeman 45+3'; Yueill (yellow card) 65'; Gil 90+1' (pen.)	Stadium: Subaru Park; Attendance: 18,524; Referee: Malik Badawi

October 28 32	Nashville SC	0–0	Philadelphia Union	Nashville, Tennessee
8:30 p.m. EDT	Tagseth (yellow card) 22'	Report	Lukić (yellow card) 40'; Jacques (yellow card) 90+2'	Stadium: Geodis Park; Attendance: 24,115; Referee: Pierre-Luc Lauzière

October 31 33	FC Cincinnati	1–0	Philadelphia Union	Cincinnati, Ohio
2:00 p.m. EDT	Jabbari 70'	Report		Stadium: TQL Stadium; Attendance: 24,013; Referee: Allen Chapman

November 7 34	Philadelphia Union	4–1	Toronto FC	Chester, Pennsylvania
4:00 p.m. EST	C. Sullivan 28', 56'; Q. Sullivan 41' (pen.); Lukić (yellow card) 45'; Damiani 72' (pen.); Bender (yellow card) 87'	Report	Sargent 45+7'; Osorio (yellow card) 67'; Aristizábal (yellow card) 90+3'	Stadium: Subaru Park; Attendance: 19,145; Referee: Timothy Ford

=== MLS Cup playoffs ===
November 21 Round one match 1	New England Revolution	2–0	Philadelphia Union	Foxborough, Massachusetts
2:00 PM EST	Harriel 11' (o.g.); Sands (yellow card) 45'; Miller 73'	Report	Harriel (yellow card) 17'; Wagner (yellow card) 77'	Stadium: Gillette Stadium; Attendance: 18,084; Referee: Lorenzo Hernandez

November 28 Round one match 2	Philadelphia Union	v	New England Revolution	Chester, Pennsylvania
4:30 PM EST				Stadium: Subaru Park

December 2 Round one match 3	New England Revolution	v	Philadelphia Union	Foxborough, Massachusetts
EST				Stadium: Gillette Stadium

=== CONCACAF Champions Cup ===
==== Round one ====
February 18 First leg	Defence Force (Trinidad and Tobago)	0–5	(United States) Philadelphia Union	Port of Spain, Trinidad & Tobago
6:00 pm EST	Bailey (yellow card) 28'; Jones (yellow card) 70' (yellow-red card) 90+2'; Sadoo (yellow card) 84'; Noel (yellow card) 89'	Report	Iloski 29'; Alladoh 32'; Harriel (yellow card) 54'; Makhanya 64'; Damiani 69', 81' (pen.)	Stadium: Hasely Crawford Stadium; Attendance: 1,428; Referee: Reon Radix (Grenada)

February 26 Second leg	Philadelphia Union (United States)	7–0 (12–0 agg.)	(Trinidad and Tobago) Defence Force	Chester, Pennsylvania
7:00 pm EST	Martínez 7'; Lukić 10' (pen.); Korzeniowski 12', 48', (yellow card) 23'; Bender 53'; C. Sullivan 76', 88'; Olivas (yellow card) 77'	Report	St. Hillaire (yellow card) 25'	Stadium: Subaru Park; Attendance: 11,467; Referee: Julio Luna (Guatemala)
Note: Philadelphia Union won 12–0 on aggregate.

==== Round of 16 ====
March 10 First leg	Philadelphia Union (United States)	0–1	(Mexico) América	Chester, Pennsylvania
7:00 pm EDT	Martínez (yellow card) 18'; Makhanya (yellow card) 44'; Anello (yellow card) 47'	Report	Veiga 20'; Dourado (yellow card) 87'	Stadium: Subaru Park; Attendance: 18,534; Referee: Keylor Herrera (Costa Rica)

March 18 Second leg	América (Mexico)	1–1 (2–1 agg.)	(United States) Philadelphia Union	Mexico City, Mexico
9:00 pm EDT	Dourado 6'; Cáceres (yellow card) 29'	Report	Bueno 49' (pen.); Ndinga (yellow card) 83'	Stadium: Estadio Ciudad de los Deportes; Attendance: 15,841; Referee: Saíd Martínez (Honduras)
Note: América won 2–1 on aggregate.

=== Leagues Cup ===
==== League phase ====
Pos	Team	Pld	W	PW	PL	L	GF	GA	GD	Pts
14	Inter Miami CF	3	1	0	0	2	7	7	0	3
15	New York City FC	3	1	0	0	2	4	4	0	3
16	Seattle Sounders FC	3	1	0	0	2	4	5	−1	3
17	Philadelphia Union	3	1	0	0	2	3	4	−1	3
18	Vancouver Whitecaps FC	3	0	0	1	2	2	5	−3	1

Source: Leagues Cup

August 6 1	Cruz Azul (Mexico)	1–0	(United States) Philadelphia Union	Chester, Pennsylvania
8:00 p.m. EDT	Paradela 3', (yellow card) 10'; Lira (yellow card) 53'	Report	Bueno (yellow card) 23'	Stadium: Subaru Park; Attendance: 14,958; Referee: Juan Gabriel Calderón

August 9 2	Philadelphia Union (United States)	3–1	(Mexico) Necaxa	Chester, Pennsylvania
7:30 p.m. EDT	Harriel 3'; Pierre (yellow card) 11'; Damiani 12'; C. Sullivan 53'; Vassilev (yellow card) 59'; Sery Larsen (yellow card) 64'	Report	Pedraza (yellow card) 35'; Espindola 79'; Faravelli (yellow card) 87'	Stadium: Subaru Park; Attendance: 6,504; Referee: Jefferson Escobar (Honduras)

August 13 3	Philadelphia Union (United States)	0–2	(Mexico) Santos Laguna	Chester, Pennsylvania
7:00 p.m. EDT	Sundstrom (yellow card) 84'; Sery Larsen (yellow card) 90'	Report	Mariscal (yellow card) 25'; Picón (yellow card) 26'; Sordo 48'; Bullaude 51'; Pardo (yellow card) 86'	Stadium: Subaru Park; Attendance: 5,820; Referee: Oshane Nation
