= List of Philadelphia Union records and statistics =

Philadelphia Union is an American professional soccer team based in Chester, Pennsylvania, that competes in Major League Soccer (MLS).

This is a list of franchise records for Philadelphia, which dates from their inaugural season in 2010 to present.

== Honors ==
- Supporters' Shield
  - Winners: 2020, 2025
- U.S. Open Cup
  - Runners-up (3): 2014, 2015, 2018

== Player records ==
=== Appearances ===
As of October 22, 2022 (All competitive matches):

Place	Name	Period	MLS	Playoffs	Open Cup	Total
1	(United States) Ray Gaddis	2012–2020	221	4	21	246
2	(Jamaica) **Andre Blake**	2014–present	204	6	8	218
3	(United States) **Alejandro Bedoya**	2016–present	185	5	5	195
4	(France) Sébastien Le Toux	2010–2011; 2013–2016	175	2	16	193
5	(United States) Brian Carroll	2011–2017	166	2	15	183
6	(England) **Jack Elliot**	2016–present	162	4	6	172
7	(United States) Sheanon Williams	2010–2015	141	2	12	155
8	(Brazil) Ilsinho	2016–2021	130	5	5	140
9	(United States) C. J. Sapong	2015–2019	123	2	10	135
10	**(Brazil)** Fabinho	2013–2019	122	1	12	135

Bold signifies current Union player

=== Goalscorers ===
As of October 22, 2022 (All competitive matches):

Place	Name	Period	MLS	Playoffs	Open Cup	CCL	Total
1	(France) Sébastien Le Toux	2010–2011; 2013–2016	50	1	6	0	57
2	(Poland) Kacper Przybylko	2019–2021	35	0	0	5	40
3	(United States) C. J. Sapong	2015–2018	36	0	2	0	38
4	(United States) Jack McInerney	2010–2014	25	0	3	0	28
4	(Jamaica) **Cory Burke**	2018–present	25	0	3	0	28
6	(Hungary) **Dániel Gazdag**	2021–present	26	1	0	0	27
7	(United States) **Alejandro Bedoya**	2016–present	22	2	1	0	25
8	(United States) Conor Casey	2013–2015	21	0	1	0	22
8	(Brazil) Ilsinho	2016–2021	22	0	0	0	22
10	(United States) Fafà Picault	2017–2019	21	0	0	0	21

Bold signifies current Union player

=== Shutouts ===
As of October 22, 2022 (All competitive matches):

Place	Name	Period	MLS	Playoffs	Open Cup	CCL	Total
1	(Jamaica) **Andre Blake**	2014–present	65	2	2	3	72
2	(United States) Zac MacMath	2011–2015	28	0	1	0	29
3	(Colombia) Faryd Mondragón	2011	7	0	0	0	7
3	(United States) John McCarthy	2015–2018	4	0	3	0	7
5	(United States) Brian Sylvestre	2015	5	0	0	0	5
6	(United States) Brad Knighton	2010	2	0	0	0	2
7	(United States) Chris Konopka	2020–2013	0	0	1	0	1
7	(Algeria) Raïs M'Bolhi	2014–2015	1	0	0	0	1

Bold signifies current Union player

== Coaching records ==
As of October 31, 2018

Coach	From	To	Record				
Coach	From	To	G	W	D	L	Win %
(Poland) Piotr Nowak	May 28, 2009	June 13, 2012	79	23	24	32	29.11
(United States) John Hackworth	June 13, 2012	June 10, 2014	77	26	32	19	33.77
(United States) Jim Curtin	June 10, 2014	Present	164	62	33	69	37.80
Total			320	111	89	120	34.69

== Transfer records ==
=== Highest transfer fees paid ===
Rank	Pos.	Player	From	Fee	Date
1.	Forward	(Ghana) Ezekiel Alladoh	(Sweden) Brommapojkarna	$4.5 million	December 2025
2.	Left-back	(Germany) Kai Wagner	(England) Birmingham City	$4 million	July 2026
3.	Forward	(Denmark) Mikael Uhre	(Denmark) Brøndby	$2.8 million	January 2022
4.	Winger	(United States) Agustín Anello	(Uruguay) Boston River	$2.5 million	January 2020
5.	Midfielder	(Cape Verde) Jamiro Monteiro	(France) Metz	$2 million	January 2020
6.	Attacking Midfielder	(Hungary) Dániel Gazdag	(Hungary) Honvéd	$1.8 million	January 2022
7.	Centre-back	(Denmark) Japhet Sery Larsen	(Norway) Brann	$1.75 million	January 2026
8.	Forward	(Ghana) David Accam	(United States) Chicago Fire	$1.2 million	January 2018
9.	Midfielder	(Slovenia) Matej Oravec	(Slovenia) Dunajska Streda	$1.1 million	January 2020
10.	Midfielder	(United States) Alejandro Bedoya	(France) Nantes	$1 million	August 2016

=== Highest transfer fees received ===
Rank	Pos.	Player	From	Fee	Date
1.	Midfielder	(United States) Brenden Aaronson	(Austria) Red Bull Salzburg	$6 million	October 2020
1.	Defender	(United States) Mark McKenzie	(Belgium) Genk	$6 million	January 2021
2.	Centre-back	(South Africa) Olwethu Makhanya	(Scotland) Rangers	$4.5 million	July 2026
3.	Midfielder	(United States) Paxten Aaronson	(Germany) Eintracht Frankfurt	$4 million	November 2022
3.	Forward	(Israel) Tai Baribo	(United States) DC United	$4 million	December 2025
3.	Attacking Midfielder	(Hungary) Dániel Gazdag	(United States) Columbus Crew	$4 million	April 2025

== Designated Players ==
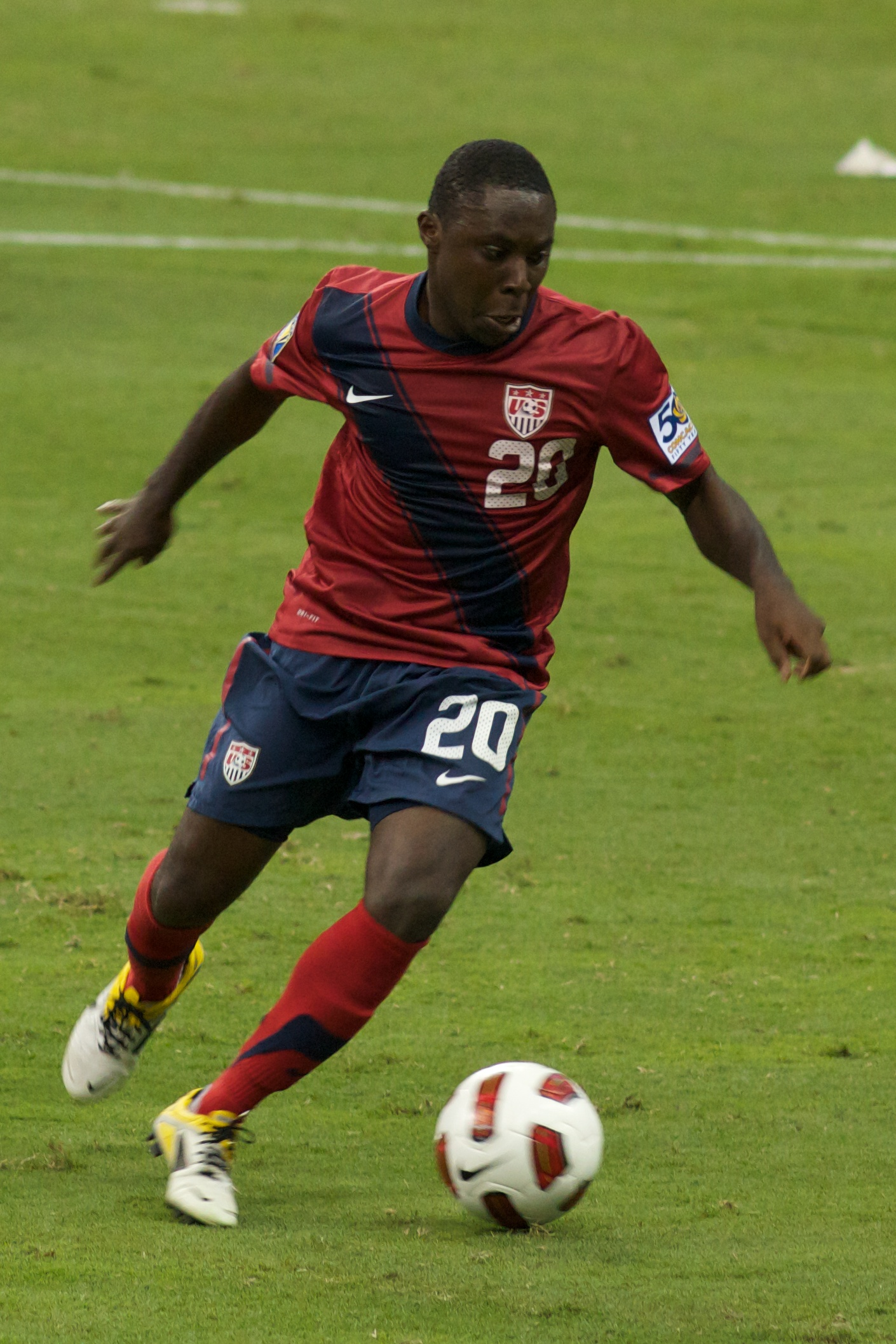
Adu became the club's first DP in 2011.

- (Argentina) Cristian Maidana
- (Brazil) Kléberson
- (Czech Republic) Bořek Dočkal
- (Mexico) Marco Fabián
- (United States) Freddy Adu
- (United States) **Alejandro Bedoya**
- (United States) Maurice Edu
- (Venezuela) Fernando Aristeguieta
- (Cape Verde) Jamiro Monteiro
- (Argentina) Julián Carranza
- (Denmark) Mikael Uhre
- (Uruguay) **Bruno Damiani**
- (Germany) **Kai Wagner**

Bold signifies current Union player

== Homegrown Players ==
- (Mexico) Cristhian Hernández
- (United States) Anthony Fontana
- (United States) Derrick Jones
- (United States) Mark McKenzie
- (United States) Jimmy McLaughlin
- (United States) Zach Pfeffer
- (United States) Matthew Real
- (United States) Auston Trusty
- (United States) Brenden Aaronson
- (Belgium) Jack de Vries
- (United States) Matt Freese
- (United States) Cole Turner
- (United States) **Nathan Harriel**
- (United States) Jack McGlynn
- (United States) Paxten Aaronson
- (United States) Brandan Craig
- (United States) **Quinn Sullivan**
- (Haiti) Anton Sorenson
- (United States) **Jeremy Rafanello**
- (United States) **Cavan Sullivan**
- (United States) **Frankie Westfield**
- (United States) **Andrew Rick**
- (United States) **Neil Pierre**

Bold signifies current Union player
