= Milan Iloski =

American soccer player (born 1999)

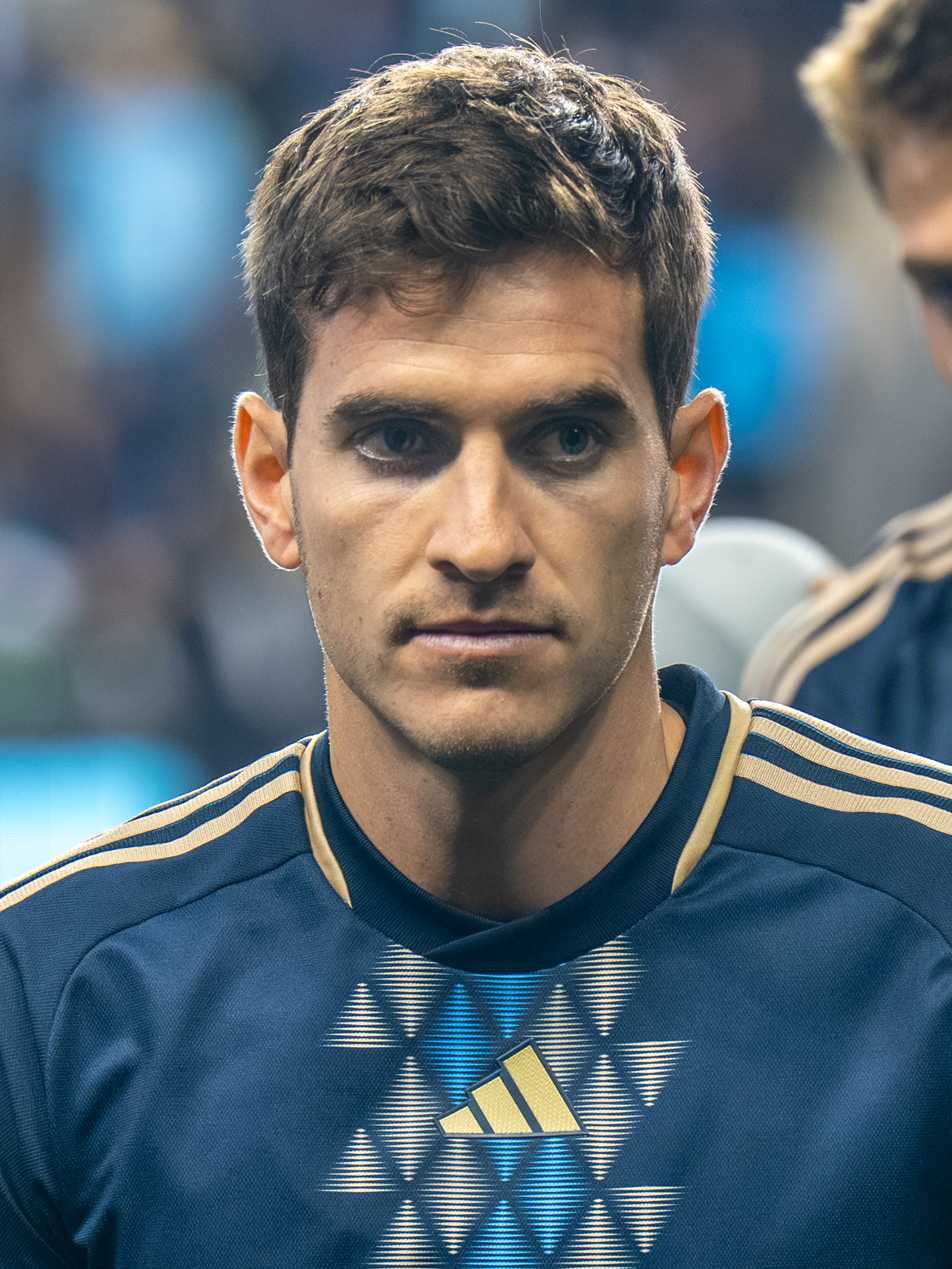
- Iloski with the Philadelphia Union in 2025

Personal information
- Date of birth: July 29, 1999 (age 27)
- Place of birth: Escondido, California, U.S.
- Height: 5 ft 11 in (1.80 m)
- Position: Forward

Team information
- Current team: Philadelphia Union
- Number: 10

Youth career
- 2016–2017: Real Salt Lake AZ

College career
Years	Team	Apps	(Gls)
2017–2019	UCLA Bruins	46	(23)

Senior career*
Years	Team	Apps	(Gls)
2018	Golden State Force	1	(0)
2019	Ogden City SC	4	(1)
2020–2021	Real Salt Lake	2	(0)
2020–2021	Real Monarchs (res.)	19	(5)
2022–2023	Orange County SC	66	(39)
2024–2025	Nordsjælland	17	(2)
2025	→ San Diego FC (loan)	14	(10)
2025–	Philadelphia Union	39	(19)
- * Club domestic league appearances and goals as of September 30, 2026

Milan Iloski (born July 29, 1999) is an American professional soccer player who plays as a forward for the Philadelphia Union of Major League Soccer.

== Career ==
=== College and amateur ===
Iloski played three years of college soccer at the University of California, Los Angeles, between 2016 and 2019, scoring 23 goals and tallying 6 assists in 46 appearances.

Iloski also played with USL League Two sides FC Golden State Force and Ogden City SC.

=== Real Salt Lake ===
On January 15, 2020, Iloski signed as a Homegrown Player for Real Salt Lake of Major League Soccer. Iloski made his professional debut on March 7, 2020, appearing for Real Monarchs in the USL Championship in a 1–0 loss to San Antonio FC. Following the 2021 season, Iloski's contract option was declined by Salt Lake.

=== Orange County SC ===
On February 22, 2022, Iloski signed with USL Championship club Orange County SC. Iloski made his debut for OCSC on March 13, 2022, scoring the team's only goal in a 2–1 loss to Colorado Springs Switchbacks FC. On May 17, 2022, Iloski was named USL Championship Player of the Week for Week 10 of the 2022 season in recognition of his hat-trick in OCFC's 5–1 win against FC Tulsa. His hat-trick against Tulsa was the first in OCSC club history to be completed in a single half. On July 26, 2022, Iloski was named USL Championship Player of the Week for the second time during the 2022 season, this time for notching 2 goals and 2 assists during a 5–2 victory over LA Galaxy II in Week 20.

=== FC Nordsjælland ===
On September 12, 2023 it was confirmed, that Iloski would join Danish Superliga side FC Nordsjælland upon the opening of the winter transfer window on January 1, 2024. Iloski scored his first goal for the club in the friendly against Los Angeles FC in the 3–1 win.

==== Loan to San Diego FC ====
On April 2, 2025, Iloski signed for his hometown club San Diego FC. On June 25, 2025, Iloski scored the first ever hat trick in San Diego FC history against Vancouver Whitecaps FC. On July 15, 2025, Iloski and San Diego mutually agreed to terminate his loan early to allow him to return to Nordsjælland.

=== Philadelphia Union ===
On August 5, 2025, Iloski signed a permanent deal with Philadelphia Union until 2027 after they acquired him after trading up the MLS Waiver Order from CF Montréal. In exchange, Montréal received the 21st spot in the waiver order, a guaranteed $100,000 in 2025 General Allocation Money and up to an additional $150,000 in conditional General Allocation Money.

== Personal life ==
Milan is the brother of fellow professional soccer players, Brian Iloski and Eric Iloski. He and his brothers are of Macedonian descent.

== Career statistics ==
As of match played September 27, 2026

Appearances and goals by club, season and competition
Club	Season	League			National cup (Note: Includes U.S. Open Cup, Danish Cup)		Continental		Other		Total	
Club	Season	Division	Apps	Goals	Apps	Goals	Apps	Goals	Apps	Goals	Apps	Goals
Real Salt Lake	2020	MLS	1	0	0	0	—		—		1	0
Real Salt Lake	2021	MLS	1	0	0	0	—		—		1	0
Real Salt Lake	Total		2	0	0	0	—		—		2	0
Real Monarchs (loan)	2020	USL	1	0	—		—		—		1	0
Real Monarchs (loan)	2021	USL	18	5	—		—		—		18	5
Real Monarchs (loan)	Total		19	5	—		—		—		19	5
Orange County SC	2022	USL	31	22	2	1	—		—		33	23
Orange County SC	2023	USL	35	17	2	3	—		—		37	20
Orange County SC	Total		66	39	4	4	—		—		70	43
Nordsjælland	2024–25	Danish Superliga	16	2	2	0	—		—		18	2
Nordsjælland	2025–26	Danish Superliga	1	0	0	0	—		—		1	0
Nordsjælland	Total		17	2	2	0	—		—		19	2
San Diego FC (loan)	2025	MLS	14	10	—		—		—		14	10
Philadelphia Union	2025	MLS	12	3	2	1	—		—		14	4
Philadelphia Union	2026	MLS	27	16	—		3 (Note: Appearances in CONCACAF Champions Cup)	1	2 (Note: Appearances in Leagues Cup)	0	32	17
Philadelphia Union	Total		39	19	2	1	3	1	2	0	46	21
Career total			157	75	8	5	3	1	2	0	170	81

== Honors ==
Philadelphia Union

- Supporters' Shield: 2025

Individual

- USL Championship Golden Boot: 2022
