= Kevin Picón =

Mexican footballer (born 2004)

Personal information
- Full name: Kevin Oswaldo Picón Álvarez
- Date of birth: 24 February 2004 (age 22)
- Place of birth: León, Guanajuato, Mexico
- Height: 1.74 m (5 ft 9 in)
- Position: Full-back

Team information
- Current team: Santos Laguna
- Number: 22

Youth career
- 2019–2023: Santos Laguna

Senior career*
Years	Team	Apps	(Gls)
2023–2025	Sporting Atlético	1	(1)
2026–	Santos Laguna	15	(0)

International career^{‡}
2022	Mexico U20	2	(0)
- * Club domestic league appearances and goals as of 1 November 2026 ‡ National team caps and goals as of 3 June 2026

Kevin Oswaldo Picón Álvarez (born 24 February 2004) is a Mexican professional footballer who plays as a full-back for Liga MX club Santos Laguna.

== Club career ==
Picón began his career at the academy of Santos Laguna before moving to Sporting Atlético where he stayed for two years before moving back to Santos Laguna on 7 January 2026. One week later, Picón made his Liga MX in a 1–3 loss to Toluca in which he played the first half and got a yellow card.

== Career statistics ==
As of 1 November 2026

Club	Season	League			Cup		Continental		Other		Total	
Club	Season	Division	Apps	Goals	Apps	Goals	Apps	Goals	Apps	Goals	Apps	Goals
Santos Laguna	2022–23	Liga MX	—		2 (Note: Appearances in Copa Sky por México)	0	—		—		2	0
Sporting Atlético	2023–24	Tercera Federación – Group 2	1	1	—		—		—		1	1
Santos Laguna	2025–26	Liga MX	12	0	—		—		—		12	0
Santos Laguna	2026–27	Liga MX	3	0	—		—		2 (Note: Appearances in Leagues Cup)	0	5	0
Santos Laguna	Total		15	0	—		—		2	0	17	0
Career total			16	1	0	0	0	0	2	0	18	1
