= Kai Wagner =

German footballer (born 1997)

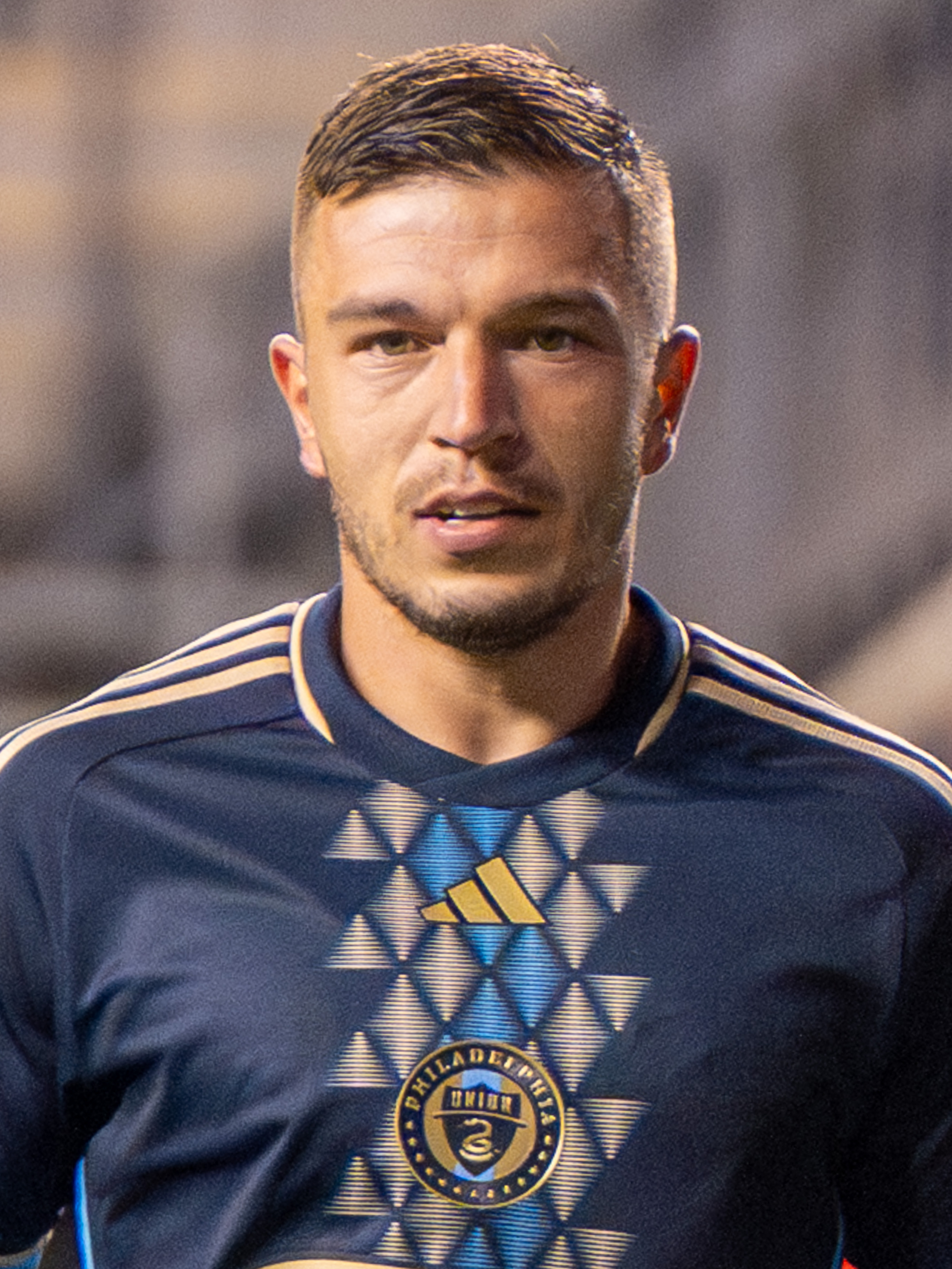
- Wagner with the Philadelphia Union in 2025

Personal information
- Full name: Kai Harley Wagner
- Date of birth: 15 February 1997 (age 29)
- Place of birth: Geislingen an der Steige, Baden-Württemberg, Germany
- Height: 1.82 m (6 ft 0 in)
- Position: Left-back

Team information
- Current team: Philadelphia Union
- Number: 27

Youth career
- 2001–2009: SV Lonsee
- 2009–2014: SSV Ulm
- 2015: FC Augsburg

Senior career*
Years	Team	Apps	(Gls)
2015–2016	SSV Ulm	32	(1)
2016–2017	Schalke 04 II	33	(0)
2017–2019	Würzburger Kickers	40	(0)
2019–2026	Philadelphia Union	204	(8)
2026	Birmingham City	16	(0)
2026–	Philadelphia Union	3	(0)
- * Club domestic league appearances and goals as of 5 August 2026

Kai Harley Wagner (born 15 February 1997) is a German professional footballer who plays as a left-back for the Philadelphia Union of Major League Soccer.

== Career ==
=== SSV Ulm ===
Ahead of the 2015–16 season, Wagner signed his first professional contract at 18 years old with SSV Ulm competing in the Oberliga Baden-Württemberg, the fifth tier of German football. Wagner made 32 appearances and scored one goal, helping earn SSV Ulm the championship title and promotion to the fourth tier Regionalliga.

=== Schalke 04 ===
In summer of 2016, Wagner secured a transfer to Schalke 04 II competing in the Regionalliga West, the fourth tier of German football.

=== Würzburger Kickers ===
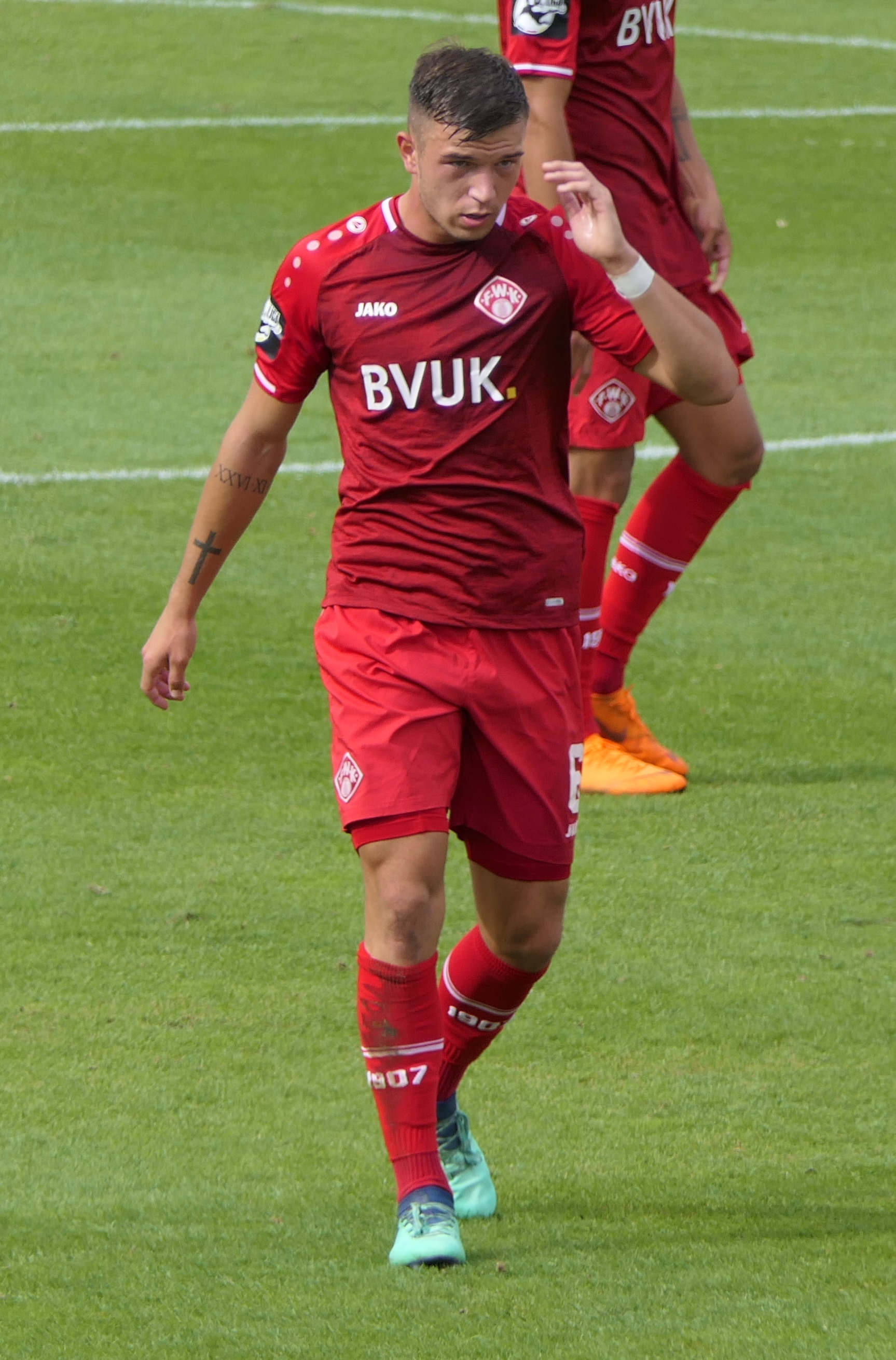
Wagner playing for Würzburger Kickers

In June 2017, Wagner secured a transfer to Würzburger Kickers competing in the 3. Liga, the third tier of German football after being relegated at the conclusion of the 2016–17 season.

=== Philadelphia Union ===
In February 2019, Wagner signed with Major League Soccer club Philadelphia Union for an undisclosed transfer fee. Wagner would emerge as one of the best left backs in MLS, contributing 30 appearances and eight assists in his first season with the Union.

The 2020 season improved on the 2019 season, despite the disruptions of the COVID-19 pandemic, Kai contributed to the Union's advancing to the semi-finals of the MLS is Back Tournament including his first goal for the Union in a 2–1 win over Inter Miami. The Union finished the season with the best league record earning the team's first trophy, the 2020 Supporters' Shield. Wagner contributed 14 starts, one goal, and two assists in the Union's championship season.

In January 2021, Wagner signed a new contract with the Union through the 2022 season, with an option for 2023. In August 2021, Wagner was selected to the 2021 MLS All-Star Game versus the Liga MX All-Star team.

On 7 November 2023, Wagner was suspended for three games by Major League Soccer for violating the league's anti-discrimination policy. The violation happened on 28 October 2023, during a match against the New England Revolution when Wagner called an opposing forward, Bobby Wood, a slur considered racist towards Asian people.

On 11 January 2024, the Union re-signed Wagner to a new three-year contract that would keep him with the club through the 2026 season. This contract included a club option for the 2027 season as well. This signing came after months of speculation that Wagner would not return to the Union, and instead head overseas to play in Europe.

=== Birmingham City ===
On 2 January 2026, Wagner signed a two-and-a-half-year contract with EFL Championship club Birmingham City for an undisclosed transfer fee. Eight days later, Wagner scored his first goal for the club in a 3–2 victory over EFL League Two side Cambridge United in the third round of the FA Cup.

=== Return to Philadelphia Union ===
On 17 July 2026, Wagner was reacquired by the Philadelphia Union and is under contract through the 2028-29 season with an option for the 2029-30 season. He now occupies a Designated Player spot.

== Career statistics ==
=== Club ===
As of 2 May 2026

Appearances and goals by club, season and competition
Club	Season	League			National Cup (Note: Includes DFB-Pokal, U.S. Open Cup, FA Cup)		Continental		Other		Total	
Club	Season	Division	Apps	Goals	Apps	Goals	Apps	Goals	Apps	Goals	Apps	Goals
SSV Ulm	2015–16	Oberliga Baden-Württemberg	32	1	0	0	—		—		32	1
Schalke 04 II	2016–17	Regionalliga West	33	0	—		—		—		33	0
Würzburger Kickers	2017–18	3. Liga	27	0	0	0	—		—		27	0
Würzburger Kickers	2018–19	3. Liga	13	0	0	0	—		—		13	0
Würzburger Kickers	Total		40	0	0	0	—		—		40	0
Philadelphia Union	2019	Major League Soccer	30	0	1	0	—		2 (Note: Appearances in MLS Cup Playoffs)	0	33	0
Philadelphia Union	2020	Major League Soccer	14 (Note: Includes three MLS is Back group stage matches that counted towards the regular season)	1	—		—		4 (Note: Three appearances in MLS is Back Tournament knockout stage, one appearance in MLS Cup Playoffs)	0	18	1
Philadelphia Union	2021	Major League Soccer	33	3	—		6 (Note: Appearances in CONCACAF Champions League)	0	2	0	41	3
Philadelphia Union	2022	Major League Soccer	33	0	1	0	—		3	0	37	0
Philadelphia Union	2023	Major League Soccer	28	1	1	2	5	0	8 (Note: Seven appearances in Leagues Cup, one appearance in MLS Cup Playoffs)	0	42	3
Philadelphia Union	2024	Major League Soccer	34	1	—		4	0	7 (Note: Appearances in Leagues Cup)	0	45	1
Philadelphia Union	2025	Major League Soccer	32	2	3	0	4	0	3	0	42	2
Philadelphia Union	Total		204	8	6	2	19	0	29	0	258	10
Birmingham City	2025–26	EFL Championship	16	0	2	1	—		—		18	1
Career total			325	9	8	3	19	0	29	0	381	12

== Honours ==
SSV Ulm

- Oberliga Baden-Württemberg: 2015–16

Philadelphia Union

- Supporters' Shield: 2020, 2025
- MLS Cup runner-up: 2022

Individual

- MLS All-Star: 2021, 2022, 2025
- MLS Best XI: 2022, 2025
