= Philippe Ndinga =

Congolese footballer (born 2005)

Personal information
- Full name: Philippe Ndinga Ossibadjouo
- Date of birth: 3 June 2005 (age 21)
- Place of birth: Libreville, Gabon
- Height: 1.84 m (6 ft 0 in)
- Position: Left back

Team information
- Current team: Philadelphia Union
- Number: 20

Youth career
- 2016–2018: FC Mantes
- 2018–2022: ?
- 2022–2023: Pau FC
- 2023–2024: USL Dunkerque

Senior career*
Years	Team	Apps	(Gls)
2022–2023	Pau FC B	3	(0)
2023–2024	USL Dunkerque	0	(0)
2024–2025	Valenciennes FC B	19	(0)
2024–2025	Valenciennes FC	1	(0)
2025	Degerfors IF	10	(1)
2026–	Philadelphia Union	0	(0)

International career^{‡}
2025–	Congo U20	3	(0)
- * Club domestic league appearances and goals as of 15 February 2026 ‡ National team caps and goals as of 15 February 2026

Philippe Ndinga (born 3 June 2005) is a professional footballer who plays as a left back for the Philadelphia Union of Major League Soccer. Born in Gabon, he represents the Republic of Congo at youth level.

== Early life ==
Ndinga was born in Libreville, Gabon. When he was 11 years old, he moved to France to join his mother and further his football career.

== Youth Career ==
For the 2016–17 season, Ndinga joined FC Mantes. Between 2019 and 2022, he played for several other youth clubs.

== Club Career ==
=== Pau FC ===
During the 2022–23 season, at the age of 17, he signed with Pau FC to play for their reserve team in Group A of the Championnat National 3 (French 5th tier), for which he played 3 games. He also played 5 games for Pau FC’s U19 team. During that season, he reached the semi-finals of the Coupe Gambardella with Pau FC's U19 team.

=== USL Dunkerque ===
Scouted by USL Dunkerque, he joined the club for the 2023–24 season at the age of 18, and it took some time to adapt to his new team. He played 8 games for the U19s; however, he was an unused reserve in his lone first team game. At the end of the season, he joined Valenciennes FC as a free agent.

=== Valenciennes FC ===
For the 2024–25 season, he trained with the Valenciennes FC first team; however, he played 19 games with the reserve team in Group E of the Championnat National 3. He received his first call-up to the first team on February 15, 2025, but remained on the bench. On 9 May 2025, Ndinga made his first appearance with the first team as a late game substitute in a 4–3 defeat against league leaders, Nancy. At the end of the season, he left the team as a free agent.

=== Degerfors IF ===
On 24 July 2025, Ndinga began a 2-week trial with Degerfors IF in the Allsvenskan (Sweden’s 1st tier), Sean Sabetkar, the team’s then Assistant Sporting Director, cited “Philippe is a physical, intense center back who, with his French football education, possesses technical qualities that we find interesting.”

On 9 August 2025 in advance of the Autumn portion of the 2025 season, Ndinga signed with Degerfors IF with his contract term going through the 2029 season. In the press release announcing Ndinga’s signing, Sabetkar then cited “Philippe is a versatile, two-footed player who can handle several different roles on the pitch and has an impressive physique, which we find interesting. We like what we have seen during the weeks he has been there and we have gotten to know him as a person. He has really taken to training and has settled in well with the group.”

Ndinga started his first game, as a right back, on 24 August 2025, a 1–1 draw with AIK Fotboll. He started the remaining 9 games of the season, all as a left back, and scored his lone goal on 21 September 2025 in a 3–1 win against IK Sirius.

=== Philadelphia Union ===
On 27 February 2026, Ndinga transferred to Philadelphia Union in the Degerfors IF largest ever transfer, reported to be $2.2 million. He joins the Union as a U22 Initiative player and his contract runs through the 2028–2029 season with an option for the 2029–2030 season.

== International Career ==
Ndinga’s international career options included both Gabon and Congo with both federations were pursuing him. He chose Congo for youth team purposes and was named to its U20 team that competed in the 2025 Maurice Revello Tournament in France. Ndinga played 3 of Congo's 4 games (against Japan, Mexico and Panama), all as a center back, in its 7th Place finish. He has not committed to either of the countries yet for senior national team purposes.
