= Jovan Lukić (footballer, born 2002) =

Serbian footballer (born 2002)

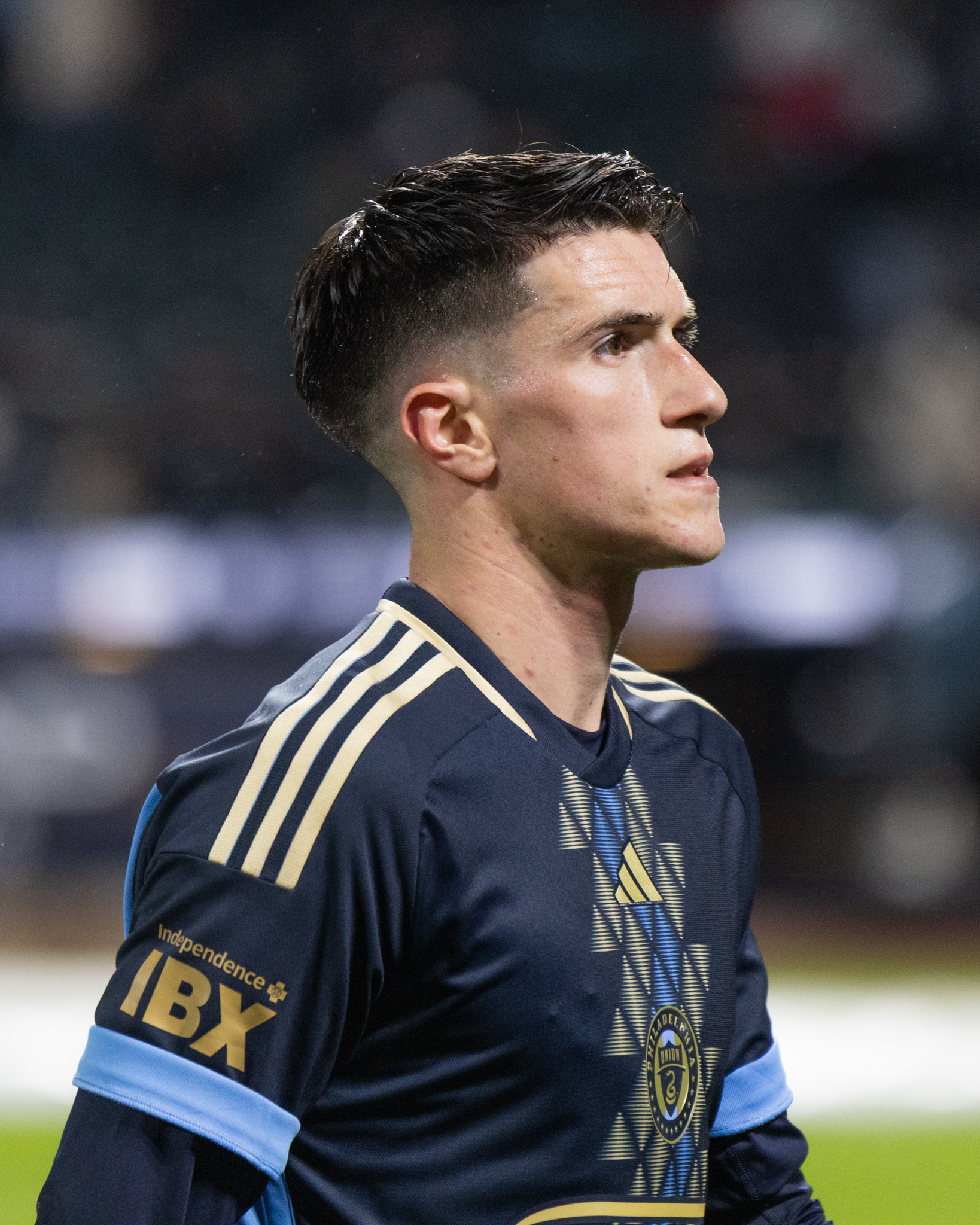

Personal information
- Date of birth: 20 January 2002 (age 24)
- Place of birth: Valjevo, FR Yugoslavia
- Height: 1.80 m (5 ft 11 in)
- Position: Midfielder

Team information
- Current team: Philadelphia Union
- Number: 4

Youth career
- –2017: Partizan
- 2017–2020: Čukarički

Senior career*
Years	Team	Apps	(Gls)
2020–2023	Čukarički	64	(2)
2023	LASK	0	(0)
2023	→ Torreense (loan)	15	(0)
2023–2024	Spartak Subotica	37	(2)
2025–	Philadelphia Union	9	(2)

International career^{‡}
2019	Serbia U17	4	(0)
2021	Serbia U18	3	(0)
2021	Serbia U20	1	(0)
2020–	Serbia U21	7	(0)
- * Club domestic league appearances and goals as of 6 January 2025 ‡ National team caps and goals as of 23:09, 12 October 2023 (UTC)

Jovan Lukić (Serbian Cyrillic: Јован Лукић; born 20 January 2002) is a Serbian professional footballer who plays as a midfielder for the Philadelphia Union of Major League Soccer.

== Career ==
On 12 January 2023, Lukić signed for LASK on a long-term contract, joining S.C.U. Torreense on loan until the end of the season.

On 16 September 2023, Lukić returned to Serbia, signing a four-year contract with Serbian SuperLiga side Spartak Subotica.

On February 5, 2025, Lukić completed a transfer to MLS club Philadelphia Union on a contract through 2026, with club options for 2027 and 2028.

== Honours ==
Philadelphia Union

- Supporters' Shield: 2025
