= Bruno Damiani =

Uruguayan footballer (born 2002)

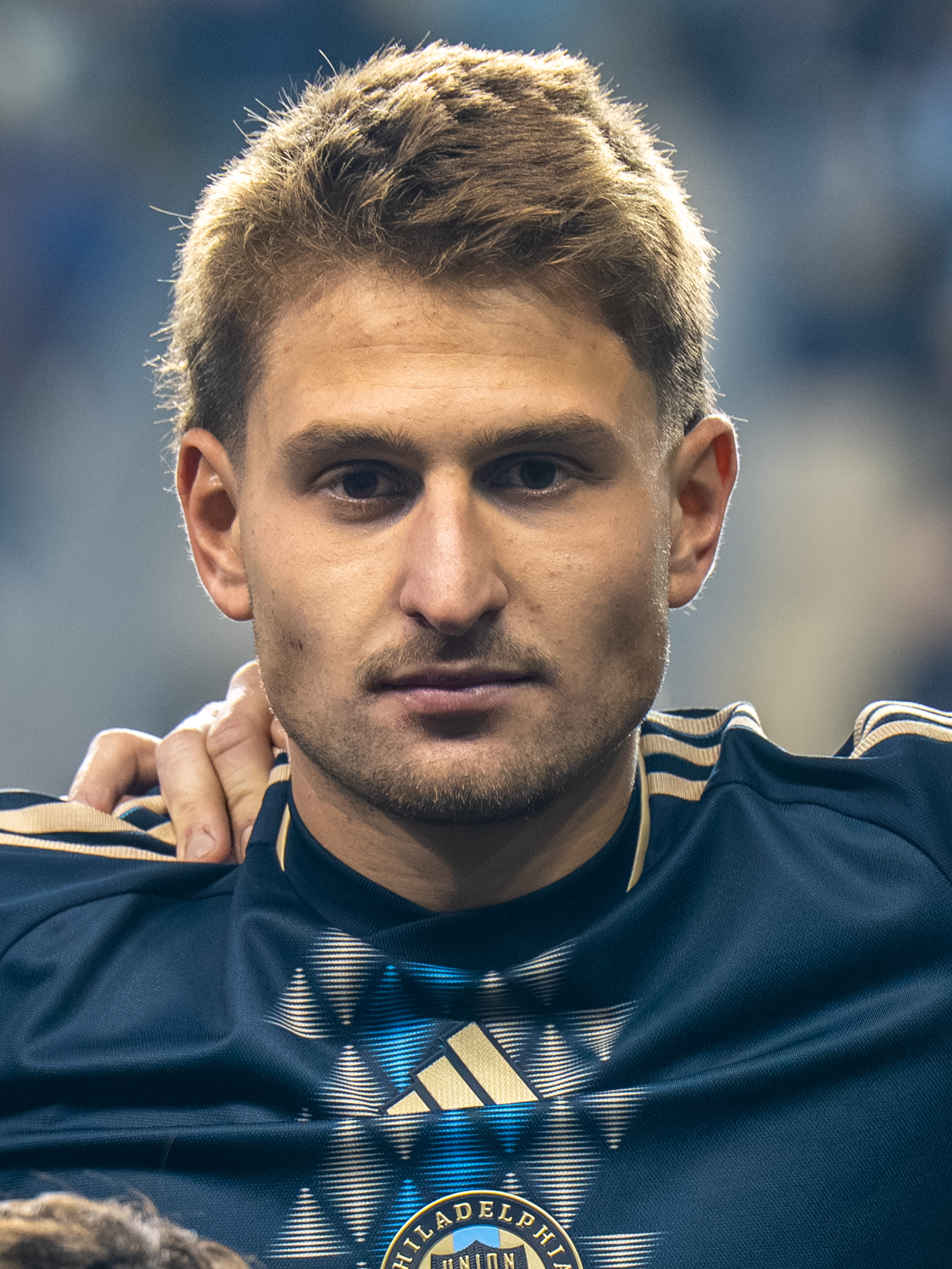
- Damiani with the Philadelphia Union in 2025

Personal information
- Full name: Bruno Damiani Píriz
- Date of birth: 18 April 2002 (age 24)
- Place of birth: Montevideo, Uruguay
- Height: 1.89 m (6 ft 2 in)
- Position: Striker

Team information
- Current team: Philadelphia Union
- Number: 9

Youth career
- Nacional

Senior career*
| Years | Team | Apps | (Gls) |
| 2023–2025 | Nacional | 15 | (1) |
| 2024 | → Boston River (loan) | 34 | (13) |
| 2025– | Philadelphia Union | 60 | (15) |

International career^{‡}
| 2024 | Uruguay local | 2 | (2) |
| 2026– | Uruguay | 1 | (1) |
- * Club domestic league appearances and goals as of 10:24, 27 September 2026 (UTC) ‡ National team caps and goals as of 01:40, 18 November 2026 (UTC)

Bruno Damiani Píriz (born 18 April 2002) is a Uruguayan professional footballer who plays as a forward for Major League Soccer club Philadelphia Union and the Uruguay national team.

== Early life ==
Damiani was born in Montevideo. After unsuccessful trials as a youngster at Nacional, River Plate Montevideo and Liverpool Montevideo, he then played in the Universitario League while attending Champagnat Universitario and Trouville Universitario.

== Youth career ==
After the unsuccessful trial as a 7-year-old to join Nacional youth teams, he then had a successful trial as a 17-year-old, as he joined Nacional U19 team in 2019.

== Club career ==
=== Nacional ===
He made his debut for Nacional B, Nacional's reserve team, in the third division in 2021. In 2022 he was Nacional B's leading scorer in the third division, with 20 goals in 2,156 minutes (1 goal every 108 minutes), the second-highest total in the division.

After several years with Nacional's youth and reserve teams, Damiani made his debut for the first team on 11 January 2023, in a friendly played at the Gran Parque Central against Vélez Sarsfield. His first official match was on 1 April of the same year, a defeat to Peñarol in which he played nine minutes. In his first season as a professional he played 20 official matches, most of them as a substitute, scoring 2 goals.

On 8 June 2023, in a Copa Libertadores match against Internacional, Damiani came on in the 87th minute and scored in the 89th minute of a 1–1 draw. With his first-team playing time uncertain, he spent most of the 2023 Clausura with Nacional B in the third division, scoring 12 goals in 1,177 minutes (1 goal every 98 minutes) to finish tied as the team's leading scorer and tied for second in the division.

=== Boston River (loan) ===
Damiani joined Boston River on a year-long loan. In the 2024 Apertura, he played 14 league games and scored 3 goals. In the 2024 Clausura, he scored 9 goals in 14 games, which made him the second-highest scorer in the Uruguayan Primera División. Having scored 8 goals in the first 9 games of the Apertura, Damiani won back-to-back awards for the division's player of the month in August/September 2024 and October 2024.

Damiani said of the loan to Boston River, “I have no doubt that my time in Boston was the best decision I could have made. I was welcomed by a serious club, with a team made up of players with whom I got along very well, and the results are there for all to see. But aside from that, it helped me learn a lot of things and have a more leading role in a team".

=== Return to Nacional ===
After the 2024 Clausura, Damiani returned to Nacional in advance of the 2025 Apertura. He started in the 2025 Uruguayan Super Cup. He was also a starter in the first round of the 2025 Apertura.

In January 2025, he extended his contract with the team until December 2027. The extension was executed while teams such as Newell's Old Boys, Gimnasia, América de Cali, Austin FC, New England Revolution, CSKA Moscow, Lokomotiv Moscow and Philadelphia Union expressed interest.

=== Philadelphia Union ===
On 12 February 2025, Damiani's transfer to Philadelphia Union was confirmed by Uruguayan reports. The transfer fee was $3.4 million with Nacional, who retained 20% of future capital gains. Nacional received $2.0 million with Boston River, Damiani's agent and Damiani received the remainder; however, Damiani donated his portion ($200,000) to the Nacional youth teams, saying "It was part of a negotiation that I was willing to give up. Since they didn't ask me for more, my father and I suggested that it was a nice way to thank the club because I owe my career to Nacional, which opened the doors to me when I was 18, and that was the gesture that occurred to us."

On 18 February 2025, Damiani's transfer to Philadelphia Union was officially announced with his designation as a Young Designated Player. His $3.4 million transfer, with $0.6 million potential add-on incentives, set a transfer record for the Union.

== International career ==
In May 2024, Damiani was named in the first ever Uruguay local national team squad, a national team consisting of only domestic league players. He made his Uruguay local team debut on 31 May 2024 in a goalless draw against Costa Rica. He scored both of the team's goals in a 2–1 win in a friendly over Grêmio on 4 December 2024.

In November 2026, Damiani received his first call-up to the Uruguay national team. He made his senior debut for Uruguay on 17 November 2026, scoring in his team's 5–0 win over the Dominican Republic.

== Style of play ==
Damiani mainly operates as a striker and has been described as a "typical '9', who always seeks to play as a team". The football data site Comparisonator named him one of the under-23 players to follow in the 2024 Uruguayan Primera División season, noting that he ranked first in touches within the box, successful short passes and offensive aerial duels won.

== Personal life ==
Damiani is a supporter of Uruguayan side Nacional. He studied administration and management, continuing to do so even after he started his club career.

== Career statistics ==
=== Club ===
As of match played 27 September 2026

Appearances and goals by club, season and competition
| Club | Season | League | | | National cup (Note: Includes Copa Uruguay, U.S. Open Cup) | | Continental | | Other | | Total | |
| Club | Season | Division | Apps | Goals | Apps | Goals | Apps | Goals | Apps | Goals | Apps | Goals |
|---|---|---|---|---|---|---|---|---|---|---|---|---|
| Nacional | 2023 | Liga AUF Uruguaya | 14 | 1 | — | | 6 (Note: Appearances in Copa Libertadores) | 1 | — | | 20 | 2 |
| Nacional | 2025 | Liga AUF Uruguaya | 1 | 0 | 0 | 0 | 0 | 0 | 1 (Note: Appearance in Supercopa Uruguaya) | 0 | 2 | 0 |
| Nacional | Total | | 15 | 1 | 0 | 0 | 6 | 1 | 1 | 0 | 22 | 2 |
| Boston River (loan) | 2024 | Liga AUF Uruguaya | 34 | 13 | 4 | 0 | — | | — | | 38 | 13 |
| Philadelphia Union | 2025 | Major League Soccer | 33 | 7 | 4 | 1 | — | | 3 (Note: Appearance in MLS Cup playoffs) | 1 | 40 | 9 |
| Philadelphia Union | 2026 | Major League Soccer | 27 | 8 | — | | 3 (Note: Appearances in CONCACAF Champions Cup) | 2 | 2 (Note: Appearances in Leagues Cup) | 1 | 32 | 11 |
| Philadelphia Union | Total | | 60 | 15 | 4 | 1 | 3 | 2 | 5 | 2 | 72 | 20 |
| Career total | | | 109 | 29 | 8 | 1 | 9 | 3 | 6 | 2 | 132 | 35 |

=== International ===
As of match played 17 November 2026

Appearances and goals by national team and year
| National team | Year | Apps | Goals |
|---|---|---|---|
| Uruguay | 2026 | 1 | 1 |
| Total | | 1 | 1 |

Scores and results list Uruguay's goal tally first, score column indicates score after each Damiani goal.

List of international goals scored by Bruno Damiani
| No. | Date | Venue | Opponent | Score | Result | Competition |
|---|---|---|---|---|---|---|
| 1 | 17 November 2026 | Estadio Domingo Burgueño, Maldonado, Uruguay | Dominican Republic | 5–0 | 5–0 | Friendly |

== Honours ==
Nacional

- Supercopa Uruguaya: 2025

Philadelphia Union

- Supporters' Shield: 2025

Individual

- Uruguayan Primera División Player of the Month: August/September 2024, October 2024
