= Frankie Westfield =

American soccer player (born 2005)

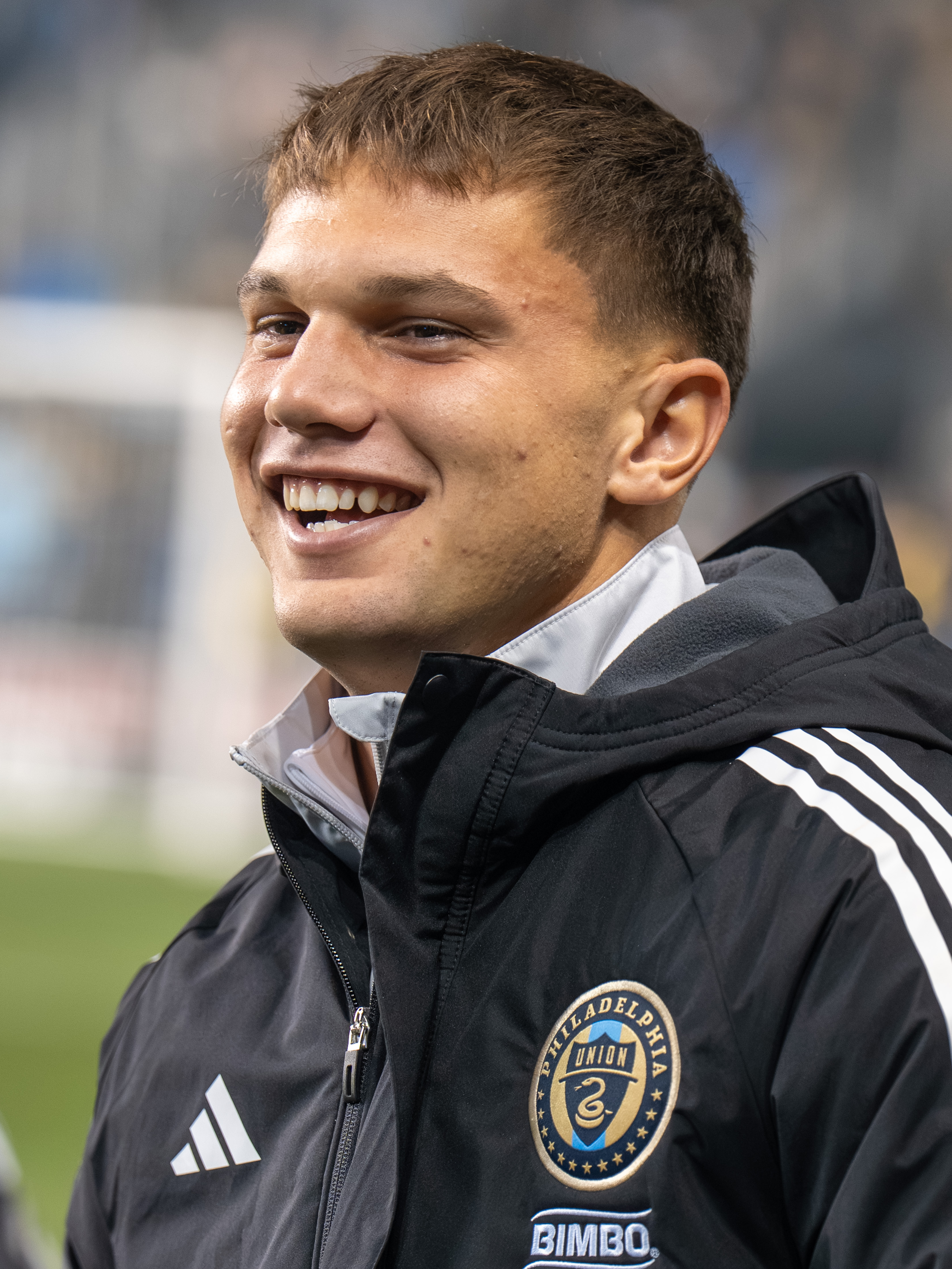
- Westfield with the Philadelphia Union in 2025

Personal information
- Full name: Francis Westfield
- Date of birth: December 9, 2005 (age 20)
- Place of birth: Philadelphia, Pennsylvania United States
- Height: 1.75 m (5 ft 9 in)
- Position: Right-back

Team information
- Current team: Philadelphia Union
- Number: 39

Youth career
- Philadelphia SC
- 2021–2024: Philadelphia Union

Senior career*
Years	Team	Apps	(Gls)
2022–2025	Philadelphia Union II	70	(8)
2024–	Philadelphia Union	50	(1)

International career^{‡}
2024–2025	United States U20	10	(1)
2026–	United States	2	(0)
- * Club domestic league appearances and goals as of October 21, 2026 ‡ National team caps and goals as of September 29, 2026

Francis "Frankie" Westfield (born December 9, 2005) is an American professional soccer player who plays as a right-back for Major League Soccer club Philadelphia Union and the United States national team.

== Club career ==
A youth product of Philadelphia Soccer Club, Westfield joined Philadelphia Union's youth academy in 2021, and debuted with the Philadelphia Union II team in the MLS Next Pro in 2022. In December 2023 he committed to playing college soccer with Penn State Nittany Lions men's soccer, but in July 2024 instead signed a professional contract with Philadelphia Union II. On February 6, 2025, he joined the senior Philadelphia Union squad as a Homegrown Player until 2028, with an option for 2029. He debuted with the senior Philadelphia Union team in a 4–2 Major League Soccer win over Orlando City SC on February 23, 2025.

== International career ==
Westfield was first called up to the United States U20s for a set of friendlies in the fall of 2024. He made the U20 squad for the 2025 FIFA U-20 World Cup.

== Career statistics ==
=== International ===
As of match played September 29, 2026

Appearances and goals by national team and year
National team	Year	Apps	Goals
United States	2026	2	0
Total		2	0

== Honors ==
Philadelphia Union

- Supporters' Shield: 2025
