= Neil Pierre =

American soccer player (born 2007)

Personal information
- Date of birth: October 19, 2007 (age 19)
- Place of birth: Harrisburg, Pennsylvania, U.S.
- Height: 6 ft 7 in (2.01 m)
- Position: Center-back

Team information
- Current team: Philadelphia Union
- Number: 44

Youth career
- Philadelphia Union

Senior career*
Years	Team	Apps	(Gls)
2023–2025	Philadelphia Union II	56	(6)
2025–	Philadelphia Union	12	(4)
2026	→ Lyngby (loan)	10	(4)

International career^{‡}
2022	United States U15	2	(0)
2022	United States U16	6	(0)
2024–2025	United States U18	3	(0)
2024–	United States U19	8	(0)
2026–	United States	4	(0)
- * Club domestic league appearances and goals as of 17 September 2026 ‡ National team caps and goals as of November 17, 2026

Neil Pierre (born October 19, 2007) is an American professional soccer player who plays as a center-back for the Philadelphia Union of Major League Soccer and the United States national team. A physically imposing and athletic, ball-playing defender, he has been praised for combining exceptional size with speed, defensive strength, passing ability and has been described as perhaps the best center-back prospect in Union history.

== Early life ==
Pierre was born in Harrisburg, Pennsylvania, to Haitian parents, and raised in Lebanon, Pennsylvania, before moving to Blue Bell, Pennsylvania, as his brother had joined the Philadelphia Union Academy. He later joined the Philadelphia Union Academy himself. In June 2023, he was named to the MLS Next All-Star Game.

== Club career ==
In July 2023, Pierre signed a professional contract with Philadelphia Union II in MLS Next Pro. He made his debut on July 23, 2023, in a 6–2 victory over Columbus Crew 2. On August 19, 2023, he scored his first goal in a loss against Huntsville City FC. In February 2025, Pierre signed a homegrown player contract with the Philadelphia Union first team, through the 2028 season, with an option for 2029, as an off-roster player for the 2025 season. He signed a short-term loan with the first team in February 2025. He signed additional short-term loans throughout the season. He made his MLS debut on September 13, 2025 against the Vancouver Whitecaps FC. For the 2025 season, he was named the MLS Next Pro Defender of the Year.

In January 2026, Pierre joined Danish 1st Division club Lyngby on a 6-months loan deal.

== International career ==
Pierre first represented the United States U15 at international level. In 2023, Pierre was called up to the United States U16 team for the International Dream Cup, where he served as captain in a match against the Netherlands. In March 2024, he was called up to the United States U19 team, ahead of a pair of friendlies. In September 2024, he was called up to the United States U18, ahead of a friendly tournament in Japan, where he appeared in all three matches.

== Personal life ==
He is the brother of fellow soccer player Nelson Pierre.

== Career statistics ==
=== International ===
As of match played November 17, 2026

Appearances and goals by national team and year
National team	Year	Apps	Goals
United States	2026	4	0
Total		4	0

== Honors ==
Philadelphia Union

- Supporters' Shield: 2025

Lyngby

- Danish 1st Division: 2025–26
