= Ezekiel Alladoh =

Ghanaian footballer (born 2005)

Personal information
- Full name: Ezekiel Kwame Alladoh
- Date of birth: 13 September 2005 (age 21)
- Height: 1.91 m (6 ft 3 in)
- Position: Forward

Team information
- Current team: Philadelphia Union
- Number: 23

Youth career
- –2024: Atlantic Sports Academy

Senior career*
| Years | Team | Apps | (Gls) |
| 2024–2025 | Accra Lions | 14 | (3) |
| 2025 | IF Brommapojkarna | 28 | (7) |
| 2026– | Philadelphia Union | 16 | (1) |
- * Club domestic league appearances and goals as of 2 August 2026

Ezekiel Alladoh (born 13 September 2005) is a Ghanaian footballer who plays as a forward for the Philadelphia Union of Major League Soccer.

== Club career ==
=== Accra Lions ===
He joined Ghana Premier League outfit Accra Lions from the Atlantic Sports Academy on 31 August 2024. He was seen as a replacement for Albania-bound Mohammed Yahaya. Among others, Alladoh scored against Accra Hearts of Oak.

=== IF Brommapojkarna ===
In January 2025 Alladoh moved to Europe as he signed for Swedish Allsvenskan club IF Brommapojkarna. Alladoh would be accommodated in Spånga, where several BP players reside in adjacent flats as well as a club representative residing on the same floor.

His first goal came in the 2024–25 Svenska Cupen against Örgryte. His first Allsvenskan goal came in a 3–0 victory over Sirius. According to Fotbolldirekt, he was already being scouted by Premier League clubs.

In May 2025, Alladoh scored the 1–0 goal against reigning champions Malmö FF, as BP defeated Malmö for the first time ever. His goal celebration entailed a phone call imitation, something Alladoh said he took from LeBron James. By that time, Alladoh had averaged 0.5 goals per match for BP.

=== Philadelphia Union ===
On December 3, 2025, Alladoh was signed by Philadelphia Union of Major League Soccer for a club record fee, with Alladoh signing a guaranteed contract beginning in 2026 through 2028 with club options for 2029 and 2030. The transfer fee was reported to be around $4.5 million.

== International career ==
In May 2024, Alladoh was named to Ghana's provisional roster for the Western Africa Zone B U20 Cup of Nations.
