= Andrew Rick =

American soccer player (born 2005)

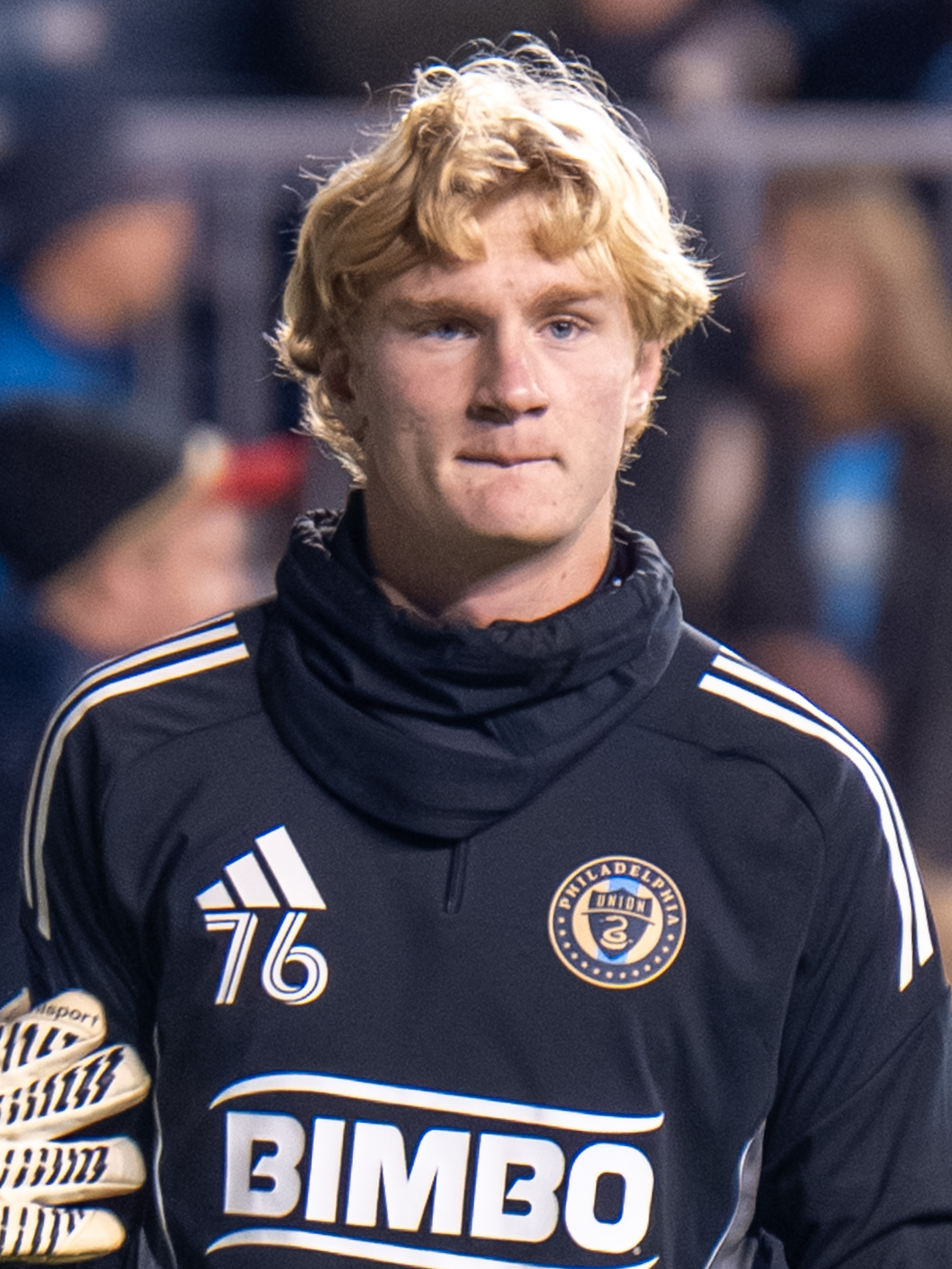
- Rick with the Philadelphia Union in 2025

Personal information
- Full name: Andrew Vincent Rick
- Date of birth: January 30, 2006 (age 20)
- Place of birth: Bethesda, Maryland, United States
- Height: 1.88 m (6 ft 2 in)
- Position: Goalkeeper

Team information
- Current team: Philadelphia Union
- Number: 76

Youth career
- FC Europa
- 2016–2022: Philadelphia Union

Senior career*
Years	Team	Apps	(Gls)
2022–2025	Philadelphia Union II	44	(0)
2024–	Philadelphia Union	21	(0)

International career^{‡}
2024	United States U19	1	(0)
2025–	United States U20	1	(0)
- * Club domestic league appearances and goals as of 23 November 2025 ‡ National team caps and goals as of November 15, 2025

Andrew Vincent Rick (born January 30, 2006) is an American professional soccer player who plays as a goalkeeper for the Philadelphia Union of Major League Soccer.

== Club career ==
A youth product of Philadelphia Union since 2016, Rick debuted with Philadelphia Union II in the MLS Next Pro in 2022. On June 24, 2023 he signed his first professional contract with Philadelphia Union II. On March 23, 2024 he signed a short-term agreement with the senior Philadelphia Union side. He debuted with the senior Philadelphia Union team in a 3–0 Major League Soccer loss to Charlotte FC on June 23, 2004. On May 4, 2024 Rick signed a contract with Philadelphia Union as a Homegrown Player until 2028, with an option to extend for 2029.

== International career ==
In May 2024, Rick was called up to the United States U19s for a training camp. In August 2025, he was called up to a domestic identity camp for the United States 20s.

== Career statistics ==
As of match played 23 November 2025

Appearances and goals by club, season and competition
Club	Season	League			Cup		Continental		Other		Total	
Club	Season	Division	Apps	Goals	Apps	Goals	Apps	Goals	Apps	Goals	Apps	Goals
Philadelphia Union II	2022	MLS Next Pro	1	0	—		—		0	0	1	0
Philadelphia Union II	2023	MLS Next Pro	18	0	—		—		1	0	19	0
Philadelphia Union II	2024	MLS Next Pro	17	0	—		—		4	0	21	0
Philadelphia Union II	2025	MLS Next Pro	8	0	—		—		1	0	9	0
Philadelphia Union II	Total		44	0	—		—		6	0	50	0
Philadelphia Union	2024	Major League Soccer	7	0	—		0	0	0	0	7	0
Philadelphia Union	2025	Major League Soccer	14	0	3	0	—		1	0	18	0
Philadelphia Union	Total		21	0	3	0	0	0	1	0	25	0
Career total			65	0	3	0	0	0	7	0	75	0

== Honors ==
Philadelphia Union

- Supporters' Shield: 2025
