= 2015 U.S. Open Cup final =

2015 final of the Lamar Hunt U.S. Open Cup

- Event: 2015 U.S. Open Cup
Philadelphia Union	Sporting Kansas City
MLS	MLS
1	1
- Sporting Kansas City won 7–6 on penalties
- Date: September 30, 2015
- Venue: PPL Park, Chester, Pennsylvania, U.S.
- Man of the Match: Tim Melia
- Referee: Ted Unkel
- Attendance: 14,463
- Weather: Rainy, 67 °F (19 °C)

The 2015 Lamar Hunt U.S. Open Cup final was played on September 30, 2015, at PPL Park, now known as Talen Energy Stadium, in Chester, Pennsylvania. The match determined the winner of the 2015 U.S. Open Cup, a tournament open to amateur and professional soccer teams affiliated with the United States Soccer Federation. It was the 102nd edition of the oldest competition in United States soccer. This edition of the final was contested between Sporting Kansas City (SKC) and the Philadelphia Union. The winning club would qualify for the 2016–17 CONCACAF Champions League.

Philadelphia and Kansas City both compete in the top tier of American soccer, Major League Soccer (MLS), and bypassed the initial stages of the tournament with entries into the fourth round of play. At the time of the final, SKC was in contention for the Supporters' Shield while the Union was in the hunt for a berth in the 2015 MLS Cup Playoffs. Philadelphia secured its berth in the final by defeating the Rochester Rhinos, D.C. United, the New York Red Bulls, and Chicago Fire. Kansas City's road to the final involved victories over Saint Louis FC, FC Dallas, Houston Dynamo, and Real Salt Lake.

The match was broadcast in English on ESPN2 and in Spanish on Univision Deportes Network, making it the first time since 1999 the cup final was aired on one of the ESPN networks. Sporting Kansas City won the game 7–6 on penalties after the game ended 1–1 in regulation and in overtime.

== Road to the final ==
=== Philadelphia Union ===
Teams from Philadelphia and the surrounding region have had a successful history in the Open Cup: Bethlehem Steel F.C. won five trophies between 1915 and 1926, the Uhrik Truckers won in 1936, and the Philadelphia Ukrainians won four times during the 1960s. The Union's alternative jersey, worn throughout the competition, featured a large letter "B" in the lower left corner to honor Bethlehem. Previously, the Union made a run to the final of the 2014 edition of the cup, which was the club's first cup final of any competition, but lost in extra time to Seattle Sounders FC.

=== Sporting Kansas City ===
Sporting Kansas City have previously appeared in two US Open Cup finals, winning both the 2004 and 2012 editions, and to date, are the only Kansan club to have ever won the honor. Sporting went into the Final hoping to win their third trophy in four years. To reach the final, SKC hosted all four of their cup fixtures heading to the final, which included wins over Saint Louis FC, FC Dallas, Houston Dynamo and Real Salt Lake.

== Match details ==
September 30, 2015
19:00 EDT

Philadelphia Union	1–1 (a.e.t.)	Sporting Kansas City
Le Toux 23'	Report	Németh 65'
Penalties
Le Toux (penalty scored); Nogueira (penalty scored); Edu (penalty missed); Barnetta (penalty scored); Casey (penalty scored); Lahoud (penalty scored); Gaddis (penalty scored); Wenger (penalty missed)	6–7	(penalty scored) Feilhaber; (penalty scored) Dwyer; (penalty missed) Németh; (penalty scored) Besler; (penalty scored) Nagamura; (penalty scored) Zusi; (penalty scored) Ellis; (penalty scored) Quintillà

PPL Park, Chester, Pennsylvania
Attendance: 14,463
Referee: Ted Unkel

Philadelphia Union	Sporting Kansas City

GK	1	(Jamaica) Andre Blake		(substituted off) 120+1'
DF	33	(Brazil) Fabinho
DF	16	(United States) Richie Marquez
DF	8	(United States) Maurice Edu (c)
DF	28	(United States) Ray Gaddis
MF	13	(United States) Michael Lahoud	(yellow card) 21'
MF	5	(France) Vincent Nogueira
MF	85	(Switzerland) Tranquillo Barnetta	(yellow card) 58'
MF	10	(Argentina) Cristian Maidana		(substituted off) 77'
MF	9	(France) Sébastien Le Toux
FW	17	(United States) C. J. Sapong	(yellow card) 90+1'	(substituted off) 116'
Substitutes:
GK	55	(United States) John McCarthy		(substituted on) 120+1'
DF	23	(Portugal) Steven Vitória
DF	2	(United States) Warren Creavalle
MF	7	(United States) Brian Carroll
MF	14	(Cameroon) Eric Ayuk
FW	11	(United States) Andrew Wenger		(substituted on) 116'
FW	6	(United States) Conor Casey		(substituted on) 77'
Manager:
Jim Curtin

GK	29	(United States) Tim Melia
DF	5	(United States) Matt Besler (c)	(yellow card) 86'
DF	4	(United States) Kevin Ellis	(yellow card) 29'
DF	15	(United States) Seth Sinovic	(yellow card) 34'	(substituted off) 78'
DF	7	(United States) Chance Myers	(yellow card) 106'	(substituted off) 112'
MF	93	(Haiti) Soni Mustivar		(substituted off) 66'
MF	10	(United States) Benny Feilhaber
MF	6	(Brazil) Paulo Nagamura	(yellow card) 94'
MF	9	(Hungary) Krisztián Németh
FW	8	(United States) Graham Zusi	(yellow card) 104'
FW	14	(England) Dom Dwyer
Substitutes:
GK	21	(United States) Jon Kempin
DF	17	(United States) Saad Abdul-Salaam		(substituted on) 78'
DF	2	(United States) Erik Palmer-Brown
MF	12	(United States) Mikey Lopez
MF	96	(Spain) Jordi Quintillà	(yellow card) 71'	(substituted on) 66'
MF	11	(Venezuela) Bernardo Añor
FW	37	(United States) Jacob Peterson		(substituted on) 112'
Manager:
Peter Vermes

Assistant referees:
Ian Anderson
James Conlee
Fourth official:
Chris Penso

Match rules

- 90 minutes.
- 30 minutes of extra time if necessary.
- Penalty shoot-out if scores still level.
- Seven named substitutes, of which up to three may be used.
- Maximum five foreign players (all citizens and legal permanent residents are considered domestic, regardless of FIFA country affiliation)
