= 2014 U.S. Open Cup final =

2014 national soccer competition final in Pennsylvania, United States

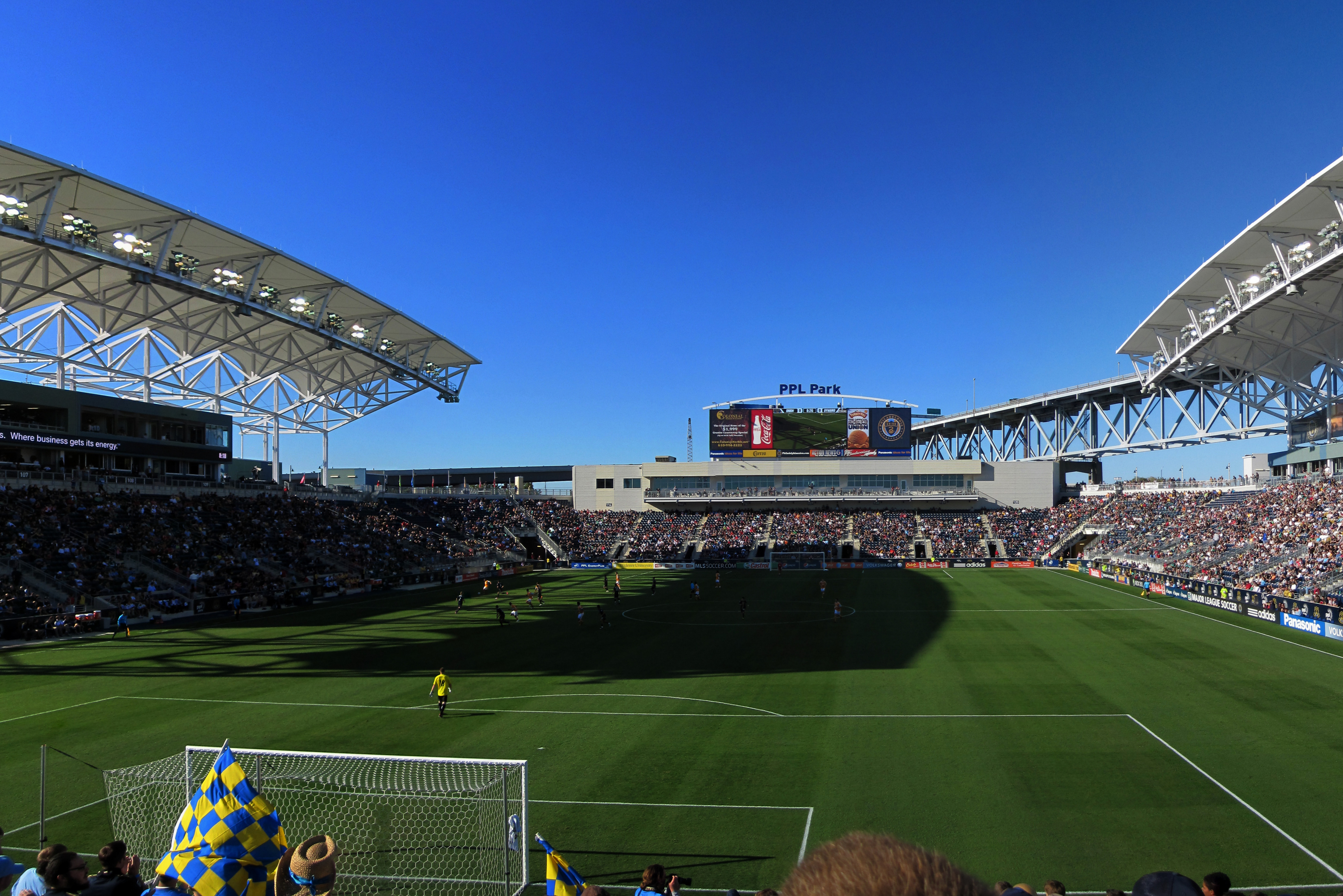
- The match was hosted at PPL Park in Chester, Pennsylvania
- Event: 2014 U.S. Open Cup
Philadelphia Union	Seattle Sounders FC
MLS	MLS
1	3
- Date: September 16, 2014
- Venue: PPL Park, Chester, Pennsylvania, U.S.
- Man of the Match: Clint Dempsey
- Referee: Armando Villarreal (Texas)
- Attendance: 15,256
- Weather: 73 °F (23 °C), cloudy

The 2014 Lamar Hunt U.S. Open Cup final was a soccer match played on September 16, 2014, at PPL Park in Chester, Pennsylvania. The match determined the winner of the 2014 U.S. Open Cup, a tournament open to amateur and professional teams affiliated with the United States Soccer Federation. This was the 101st edition of the oldest competition in United States soccer. Seattle Sounders FC won the match, defeating the Philadelphia Union. The crowd of 15,256 saw the teams go into extra time level at 1–1 before the Sounders scored twice more to end the match 3–1.

Philadelphia and Seattle both play in the top tier of American soccer, Major League Soccer (MLS), and bypassed the initial stages of the tournament with entries into the fourth round of play. The Sounders were in the midst of a Supporters' Shield-winning regular season, while the Union's start was so poor that their coach was replaced a week prior to their first game in the competition. Philadelphia secured its berth in the final by defeating the Harrisburg City Islanders, the New York Cosmos, the New England Revolution, and FC Dallas. Seattle's road to the final included victories over PSA Elite, the San Jose Earthquakes, the Portland Timbers, and the Chicago Fire.

The coaches both chose strong squads in their attempts to win the trophy, though Sounders forward Kenny Cooper, later selected as Player of the Tournament, did not appear in the final. The Union's Maurice Edu gave his team the lead with a goal in the first half, but the Sounders equalized with a second half strike by Chad Barrett, and the match went into extra time. Although Philadelphia controlled periods of the match with chances throughout, Clint Dempsey took the lead for Seattle in the first extra time period, and Obafemi Martins sealed a Seattle victory with a late goal. Seattle earned a $250,000 cash prize, as well as a berth into the 2015–16 CONCACAF Champions League. Philadelphia received a $60,000 cash prize as the competition's runner-up.

== Road to the final ==
The U.S. Open Cup is an annual American soccer competition open to all United States Soccer Federation affiliated teams, from amateur adult club teams to the professional clubs of Major League Soccer (MLS). The 2014 competition was the 101st edition of the oldest soccer tournament in the United States. For the third consecutive season, all American-based MLS teams earned automatic qualification into the third round proper. Previously, only eight teams from MLS could qualify for the tournament: six automatically based on the previous year's league results, and two more via a play-in tournament.

=== Philadelphia Union ===
Teams from Philadelphia and the surrounding region have had a successful history in the Open Cup: Bethlehem Steel F.C. won five trophies between 1915 and 1926, the Uhrik Truckers won in 1936, and the Philadelphia Ukrainians won four times during the 1960s. The Union's alternative jersey, worn throughout the competition, featured a large letter "B" in the lower left corner to honor Bethlehem.

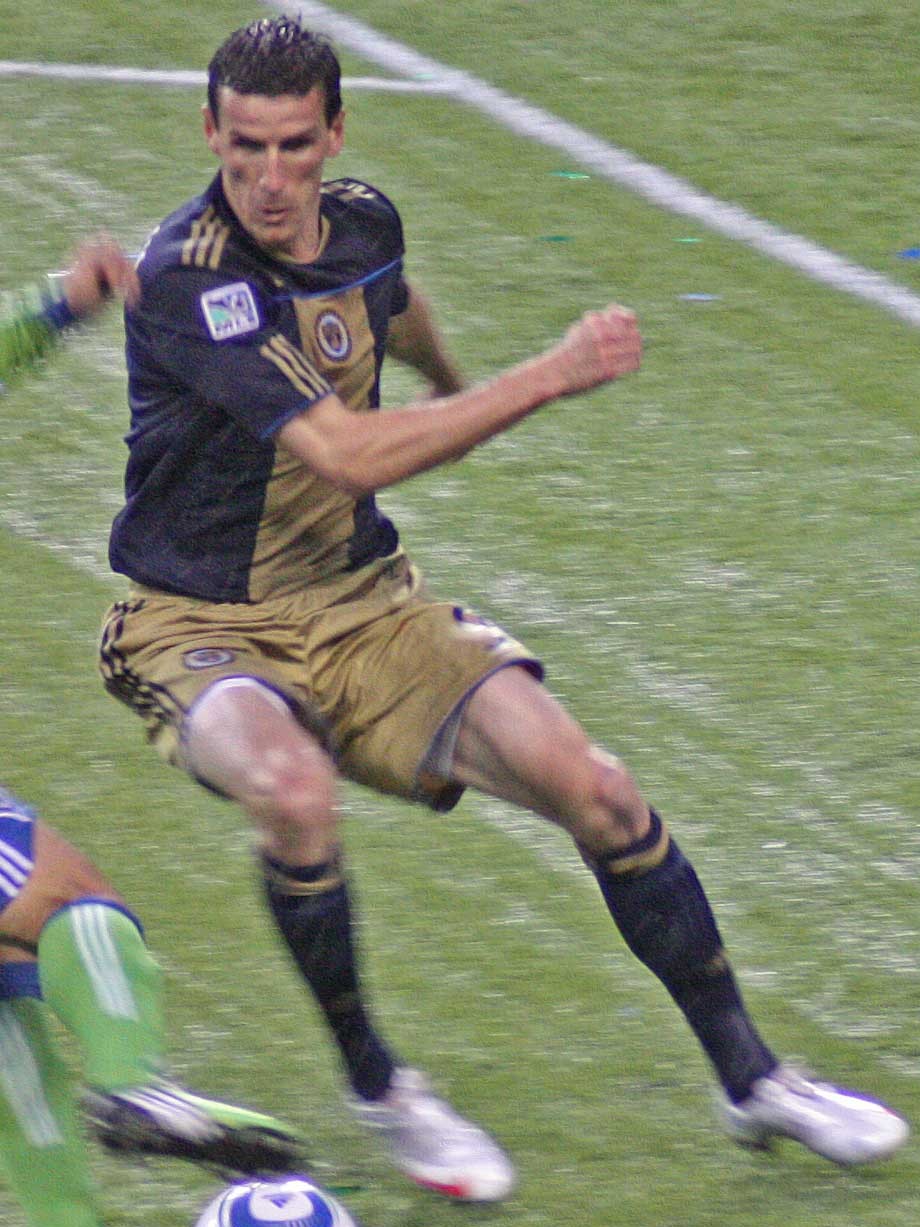
Le Toux versus the Sounders in a previous season

The Union began the MLS regular season with only 3 wins in 16 games. Their head coach John Hackworth was fired, and Jim Curtin was named as his interim replacement, a week before the first Open Cup match against their lower-league affiliate Harrisburg City Islanders on June 17. A successful run in the Open Cup had the potential to salvage the season, and Curtin said that the team was taking the home game "very seriously". Harrisburg plays in the USL Professional Division—the third division of American soccer—but Philadelphia still played several of its regular starters, and did not permit Harrisburg to use two previously loaned Union players. Philadelphia was almost eliminated, but Maurice Edu scored an equalizing goal in the 89th minute, and Andrew Wenger scored two more goals in extra time to advance the Union with a score of 3–1.

On June 24, Philadelphia played at home versus the New York Cosmos of the second-tier North American Soccer League in what was only Curtin's second game as head coach. Overtime was again needed as the teams ended regulation tied at one apiece before Sébastien Le Toux scored the game-winner in the 115th minute. Shortly after the goal, a melee erupted between the teams that resulted in two Cosmos players and one Union player being sent off for pushing and shoving. Two of New York's assistant coaches were also ejected for their parts in the disorder.

The team were at home against the New England Revolution of MLS for the fifth round, on July 8. They easily won with goals from Conor Casey and Le Toux. The latter's strike made him the modern-era Open Cup goals leader with a total of 14 scored in his career. Le Toux had a strong history with Seattle and the tournament before moving to the Union in 2009; he previously played for the second-division incarnation of the Sounders and won the 2009 Open Cup with the MLS side. He would later be named the runner-up to the year's Most Valuable Player of the Tournament. A dust storm accompanied by thunder and lightning halted the game for an hour after the 61st minute, but the Revolution could not recover from the two-goal deficit.

On August 12, Philadelphia traveled to MLS side FC Dallas for the semifinal. Amobi Okugo scored a goal in the first half before Dallas equalized. The match went to kicks as regulation and extra time resulted in a stalemate. Goalkeeper Zac MacMath made diving saves of two Dallas attempts in the shoot-out to clinch the Union's place in the final—the closest the team had been to winning a trophy in its five-year history.

=== Seattle Sounders FC ===
The Seattle Sounders won the Open Cup in 2009, 2010, and 2011. They also reached the final in 2012 but were eliminated by a lower-level side early in 2013. In 2014, they drew amateur club PSA Elite, a developmental lower-division team that had already been victorious in its first three rounds of the tournament. Seattle hosts most Open Cup home games at Tukwila's Starfire Sports stadium. The ground holds about 4,000, which is much smaller than their normal home stadium, CenturyLink Field. Coach Sigi Schmid was quoted as saying "I think our guys thrive on the closeness of the crowd. It helps spur them on to good performances." Seattle was leading MLS entering the round on June 18, and easily won 5–0. Kenny Cooper scored twice in the victory.

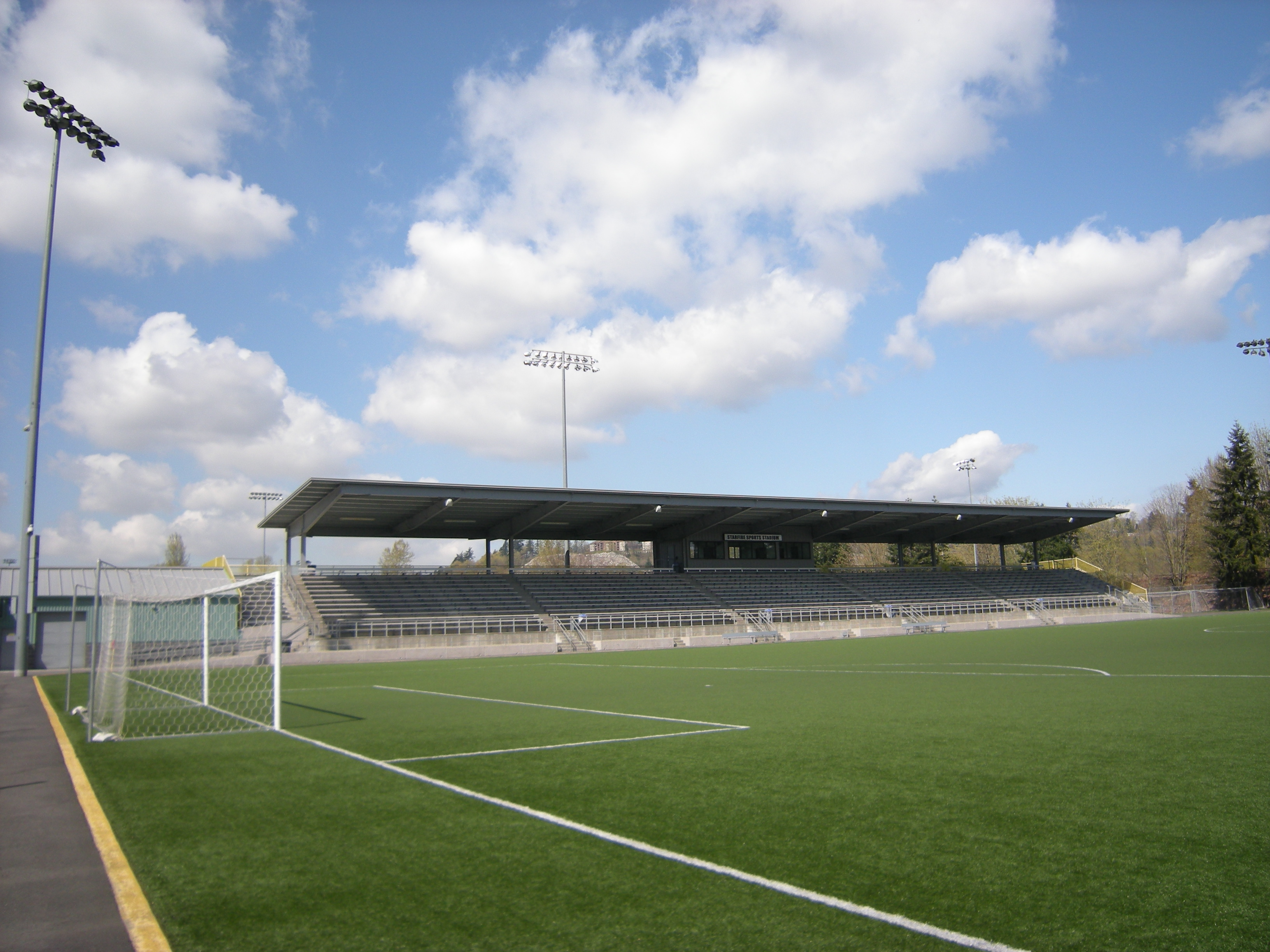
Starfire Sports in Tukwila

The Sounders hosted the San Jose Earthquakes at Starfire on June 24 and both teams scored in the first half. The Earthquakes second-string goalie, David Bingham, kept his team in the match by stopping three shots from Chad Barrett late in the second half. Neither team scored in extra time and the game went to a shoot-out. After the shoot-out ended 4–1, goalkeeper Marcus Hahnemann celebrated by drinking a beer in front of the beer garden and the home fans.

On July 9, Seattle went against its rival, the Portland Timbers, at Starfire for the quarterfinal. The Sounders went on top with an Osvaldo Alonso goal, but former Sounder Steve Zakuani assisted Darlington Nagbe to score a last-second equalizer for the Timbers in the 93rd minute. Extra time saw the ejection of Portland's Diego Chara while Cooper and Marco Pappa both found the back of the net to give the home team a 3–1 victory.

The team's semifinal match was at home against Chicago Fire on August 13. The Fire were without 2013's MLS Most Valuable Player, Mike Magee, due to suspension. Cooper and Andy Rose each scored twice while Obafemi Martins and Pappa both had a goal apiece. Seattle finished the game with three goals in the final four and a half minutes in the convincing 6–0 victory. The first goal of the match was Cooper's last of the competition as he did not play in the subsequent final. He ended the tournament with a total of 13 career Open Cup goals, one shy of Le Toux's modern-era total of 14. Cooper netted six in 2014 alone, and he would go on to be named 2014's Player of the Tournament.

== Pre-match ==
=== Venue selection ===
The United States Soccer Federation determined the host of the final with a coin flip on August 4, 2014. The winner of the toss was whoever was victorious in the FC Dallas/Philadelphia Union semifinal, meaning that the game would take place at PPL Park in Chester, Pennsylvania. It was the eleventh time the greater-Philadelphia region hosted the final and the first since 1994. The Union marketed the game by publicly displaying the trophy at local restaurants, landmarks, and events.

=== Analysis ===
The Open Cup is not held in as high regard as the MLS Cup, but it is still an important achievement. For Philadelphia, it represented their first-ever chance at a trophy, whereas Seattle had been to the finals five times in the club's six-year history. With a victory, the Sounders would tie the Fire with four overall wins by an MLS team.

The all-time record between the clubs stood at 3–2 in favor of Seattle. The Sounders had beaten the Union earlier in the year during league play, but Philadelphia had improved since then. By the time of the final, the Union had a 10-game unbeaten streak at home. Seattle had recently lost three of five MLS matches but was still one of the best teams in the league. Seattle was the favorite, with one pundit comparing Philadelphia to perennial underdog Rocky Balboa of the film series Rocky.

Player selection during the previous stages of the Open Cup was a challenge due to key personnel receiving call-ups for the World Cup. The Sounders had depth that could withstand losing players, and did not rest starters in the lead-up to the final game. The Union rested several starters during the previous weekend's league match. Philadelphia's Casey, Le Toux, and Cristian Maidana were significant attacking threats, while Seattle had the striking pair of Martins and Clint Dempsey. Defensively, Edu was Philadelphia's strongest player. Seattle also had a strong defense with young national team prospect DeAndre Yedlin, and eventual MLS Defender of the Year Chad Marshall.

== Match ==
Kickoff was scheduled for 7:30 pm local time. Armando Villarreal was the referee and his assistants were Peter Manikowski and Corey Parker. The fourth official was Jose Carlos Rivero. There were no suspensions or injuries of note. The weather was cloudy with a temperature of 73 °F (23 °C).

=== First half ===
Sounders coach Schmid made adjustments to his usual starting lineup. Pappa did not start due to a recent return from international duty with Guatemala, while star striker Martins was on the bench as well. Although he won the Golden Boot for most goals scored, Cooper was primarily a bench player throughout the year and did not start the match. Although lacking those playmakers, the Sounders came out attacking, and their first big chance came in the 10th minute when Rose slung a low cross near the face of the goal to Dempsey, whose resulting shot was off-frame.

The Union increased its pace with Andrew Wenger playing wide on the left where he repeatedly got past Yedlin to get to the byline or cut back to shoot. Maidana and Le Toux strengthened Philadelphia's position by combining on the other side of the field to penetrate Seattle's defense. Wenger connected with Le Toux who took a shot, but Seattle goalkeeper Stefan Frei was quick enough to make the stop. In the 38th minute, Maidana was fouled by Leonardo González wide right of the penalty area. Maidana's resulting free kick curled towards the back post where Brad Evans lost his footing and Edu glanced the ball with his forehead to put it in the back of the net. The home team kept control of the first half and continued creating scoring opportunities.

=== Second half ===
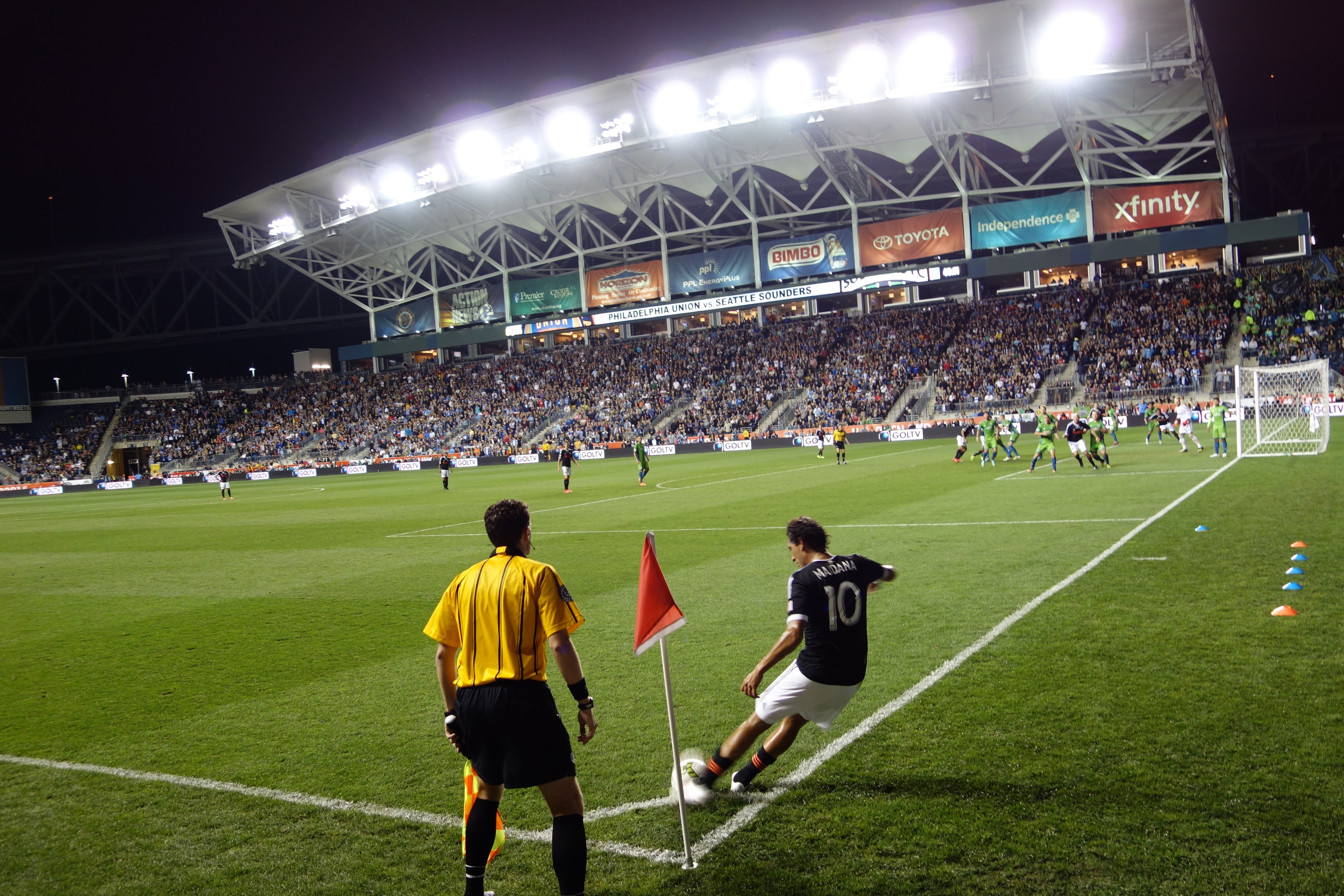
Maidana taking a corner kick for Philadelphia

Neither team made substitutions at halftime. The Sounders came out on the attack and were awarded a corner kick just three minutes into the period. Carlos Valdes attempted to clear the ball but Marshall headed it towards goal for MacMath to clear. Barrett scored from close range and the match was level at 1–1.

Seattle maintained momentum with Yedlin beginning to overcome Wenger while Martins replaced Barrett in the 60th minute. Philadelphia's midfield then again began to assert dominance and Maidana had a breakaway in the 72nd minute. Yedlin sprinted to make up ground to stop the attack in what MLS would call the "defensive play of the game". Dempsey had a chance to score off a cross from Pappa in the 76th minute but could not get a foot on the ball. Martins then had another chance that went wide before control shifted yet again to Philadelphia.

Seattle replaced Lamar Neagle with Pappa in the 74th minute in an attempt to create an advantage. Philadelphia answered with two more chances that almost won the match. Casey received a yellow card at the 57th minute and was later replaced by Pedro Ribeiro. In the 88th minute, Raymon Gaddis won the ball and took a shot that was deflected. Ribeiro took a shot but it lacked power. In stoppage time, Vincent Nogueira had another close shot that struck the post and ricocheted dangerously close to the goal before being cleared.

=== Extra time ===
Martins opened extra time with a shot on goal while the Sounders played increasingly higher on the field. Seattle took the lead in the 101st minute when Dempsey and Martins connected on a play that resulted in Dempsey making a low shot. Martins, Dempsey, and Pappa effectively countered Philadelphia's attacks in the second half of extra time and Pappa hit the crossbar on an attempted shot. Valdes had an excellent opportunity to tie the match in the 111th minute when he made a header towards the Sounders goal, but the shot was weak and easily saved. Although Philadelphia was pressing the attack, Martins scored in the 114th minute to put the Sounders up 3–1.

=== Details ===
September 16
19:30 ET

Philadelphia Union	1–3 (a.e.t.)	Seattle Sounders FC
Edu 38'	Report	Barrett 47'; Dempsey 101'; Martins 114'

PPL Park, Chester, Pennsylvania
Referee: Armando Villarreal (Texas)

Philadelphia Union
Seattle Sounders

GK	18	(United States) Zac MacMath
RB	15	(United States) Sheanon Williams
CB	4	(United States) Ethan White
CB	2	(Colombia) Carlos Valdés
LB	28	(United States) Raymon Gaddis
CM	21	(United States) Maurice Edu
CM	5	(France) Vincent Nogueira
RW	11	(France) Sebastien Le Toux		(substituted off) 91'
AM	10	(Argentina) Cristian Maidana
LW	9	(United States) Andrew Wenger		(substituted off) 82'
ST	6	(United States) Conor Casey	(yellow card) 57'	(substituted off) 78'
Substitutes:
GK	92	(Algeria) Rais Mbolhi
MF	7	(United States) Brian Carroll
MF	8	(Brazil) Fred
MF	13	(Sierra Leone) Michael Lahoud		(substituted on) 91'
MF	44	(United States) Danny Cruz		(substituted on) 81'
MF	30	(Brazil) Pedro Ribeiro		(substituted on) 78'
MF	14	(United States) Amobi Okugo
Manager:
(United States) Jim Curtin

GK	24	(Switzerland) Stefan Frei
RB	17	(United States) DeAndre Yedlin
CB	5	(United States) Chad Marshall
CB	20	(United States) Zach Scott
LB	12	(Costa Rica) Leonardo González
RM	3	(United States) Brad Evans		(substituted off) 94'
CM	13	(Cuba) Osvaldo Alonso	(yellow card) 29'
CM	5	(England) Andy Rose
LM	27	(United States) Lamar Neagle		(substituted off) 74'
CF	19	(United States) Chad Barrett		(substituted off) 60'
CF	2	(United States) Clint Dempsey
Substitutes:
GK	1	(United States) Marcus Hahnemann
DF	4	(United States) Jalil Anibaba
MF	8	(Mexico) Gonzalo Pineda		(substituted on) 94'
MF	10	(Guatemala) Marco Pappa		(substituted on) 74'
MF	42	(Uganda) Micheal Azira
FW	9	(Nigeria) Obafemi Martins		(substituted on) 60'
FW	30	(United States) Kenny Cooper
Manager:
(United States) Sigi Schmid

Assistant referees:
Peter Manikowski (Massachusetts)
Corey Parker (Maryland)
Fourth official:
Jose Carlos Rivero (New York)

Match rules

- 90 minutes.
- 30 minutes of extra time if necessary.
- Penalty shoot-out if scores still level.
- Seven named substitutes.
- Maximum of three substitutions.

=== Statistics ===
Overall
	Philadelphia Union	Seattle Sounders
Goals scored	1	3
Total shots	19	19
Shots on target	5	7
Saves	3	4
Corner kicks	12	7
Fouls committed	12	7
Offsides	2	2
Yellow cards	1	1
Red cards	0	0

== Post-match ==
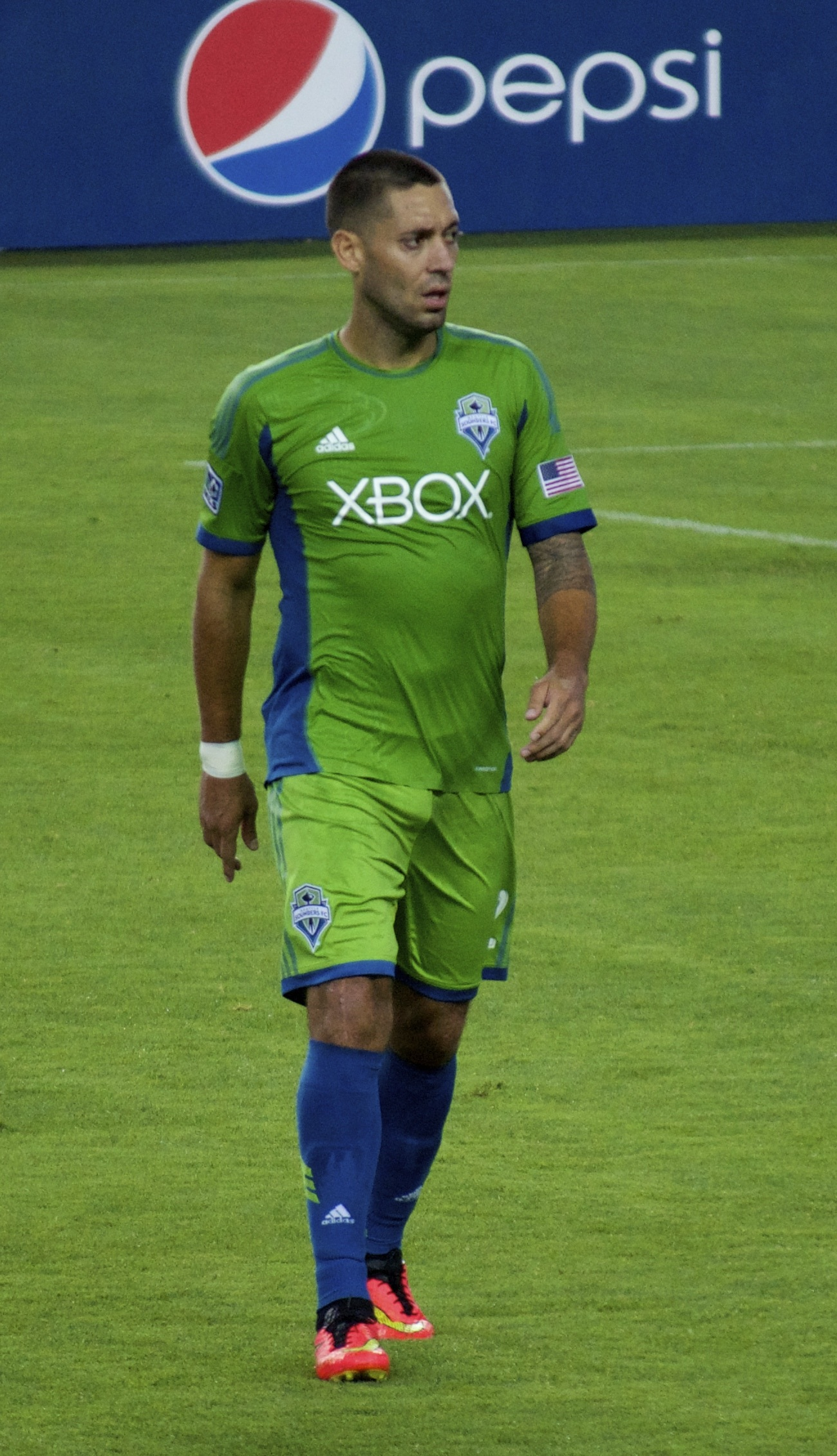
Dempsey, the Player of the Round, with the Sounders in 2014

Both teams had chances during the match with Philadelphia making an especially intense push in the final 15 minutes. While both defenses struggled throughout, Frei and MacMath combined for a total of seven saves (four and three, respectively). Schmid told the press after the final: "From a fans' standpoint, it was probably a very, very entertaining game." A writer for Sports Illustrated quipped that "Schmid's decision not to start Obafemi Martins and Pappa was confusing — and then looked like a stroke of genius", as both were integral to the Sounders offense in the later stages of the game. Schmid told reporters during a post-match interview that Martins did not start due to a muscle strain. The coach also praised the ability of Martins and Dempsey to complete key passes with each other. The Sounders received a $250,000 cash prize for winning the tournament. It was Dempsey's first club trophy of his long career, and he beat Martins in voting to be named the Player of the Round. Yedlin and Frei also received votes. Seattle went on to win the MLS Supporters' Shield for having the best record in the league before being eliminated from the playoffs. The Open Cup win granted the team a spot in the 2015–16 CONCACAF Champions League.

As runner-up, Philadelphia was awarded $60,000. Curtin told the media after the game: "I've never been proud of anything in my life that ended in a loss before ... This is the first time." Curtin's leadership on the road to the final helped convince the players, fans, media, and front office of his ability to manage the club. Although the team missed the league playoffs, his performance was enough for the team to remove the "interim" tag from his title as head coach.

GOL TV had broadcasting rights for the tournament between 2012 and 2014. The channel is not shown on many television packages, but Comcast picked up the feed in the Philadelphia area. Attendance at PPL Park was 15,256, the lowest for an Open Cup final in six years. A live stream was made available over the Internet for a fee, but the quality was so poor that refunds were promised after only 20 minutes. After the game, a writer for The Seattle Times panned the broadcast arrangements and low attendance at PPL Park, saying, "It's a shame so few were able to see it."
