= 2015 Philadelphia Union season =

Philadelphia Union
2015 season
- Owner: Keystone Sports & Entertainment
- Head coach: Jim Curtin
- Stadium: PPL Park (Capacity: 18,500)
- MLS: Conference: 9th Overall: 18th
- MLS Cup Playoffs: Did not qualify
- U.S. Open Cup: Runners-up
- Top goalscorer: League: C. J. Sapong (9); All: C. J. Sapong (9)
- Highest home attendance: 18,883 (Aug 1 vs. New York Red Bulls)
- Lowest home attendance: League: 15,374 (June 3 vs. Columbus); All: 5,782 (August 12 vs. Chicago)
- Average home league attendance: League: 17,471; All: 15,714
Home colors	Away colors

The 2015 Philadelphia Union season was the club's sixth season of existence, competing in Major League Soccer, the top flight of American soccer. The team was managed by Jim Curtin, his second season with the club and first full season after taking over from John Hackworth midway through the 2014 season. For the second consecutive season, the Union finished runners-up in the 2015 U.S. Open Cup, this time to Sporting Kansas City. The 2015 season also marked the departure of CEO Nick Sakiewicz, who had been with the club since its inaugural season. Sakiewicz was replaced with former U.S. men's national team player, Earnie Stewart, who was named Sporting Director in October 2015.

== Background ==
=== 2014 MLS regular season ===
The 2014 Philadelphia Union MLS Regular Season saw the team go 10–12–12 finishing 6th in the Eastern Conference and 12th overall. The Union had a slow first half of the season, winning only 3 of their 16 games. Because of this, head coach John Hackworth was fired and Jim Curtin was named the club's interim head coach. Following the summer break, the Union saw better results, and were in a position to reach the 2014 MLS Cup Playoffs. However, a loss to the Columbus Crew SC on October 11, 2014, put them out of the playoff race. After the season was over, the title "interim" was taken removed from Jim Curtin's title and is now the permanent head coach.

=== 2014 U.S. Open Cup ===
The 2014 U.S. Open Cup was the most successful Open Cup in the club's history. The Union entered the competition in the fourth round along with the other 18 MLS clubs. In that round, the Union defeated the Harrisburg City Islanders, a team in the third tier of the American soccer pyramid, 3-1 after extra time. In the next round, the Union defeated the NASL team the New York Cosmos 2-1 after extra time. The Union then defeated the New England Revolution 2-0 in the quarterfinals and FC Dallas 4-3 on penalty kicks after a 1–1 tie in the semifinals. In the final, the Union lost to Seattle Sounders FC 3-1 after extra time.

== 2015 roster ==
As of August 29, 2015.

Note: Flags indicate national team as defined under FIFA eligibility rules; some limited exceptions apply. Players may hold more than one non-FIFA nationality.

No.	Pos.	Nation	Player
1	GK	JAM	Andre Blake (GA)
2	MF	GUY	Warren Creavalle
5	MF	FRA	Vincent Nogueira
6	FW	USA	Conor Casey
7	MF	USA	Brian Carroll (Captain)
8	MF	USA	Maurice Edu (DP)
9	FW	FRA	Sébastien Le Toux
10	MF	ARG	Cristian Maidana (DP)
11	FW	USA	Andrew Wenger (GA)
13	MF	USA	Michael Lahoud
14	MF	CMR	Eric Ayuk Mbu
15	DF	USA	Ethan White
16	DF	USA	Richie Marquez

No.	Pos.	Nation	Player
17	FW	USA	C. J. Sapong
18	FW	VEN	Fernando Aristeguieta (DP; on loan from Nantes)
20	MF	USA	Jimmy McLaughlin (HGP)
21	MF	USA	Eric Bird
23	DF	CAN	Steven Vitória (on loan from Benfica)
27	MF	USA	Zach Pfeffer (HGP)
28	DF	USA	Ray Gaddis
29	MF	USA	Antoine Hoppenot
33	DF	BRA	Fabinho
49	GK	USA	Brian Sylvestre (on loan from Carolina RailHawks)
55	GK	USA	John McCarthy
77	MF	BRA	Fred
85	MF	SUI	Tranquillo Barnetta

=== Out on loan ===
Note: Flags indicate national team as defined under FIFA eligibility rules; some limited exceptions apply. Players may hold more than one non-FIFA nationality.

No.	Pos.	Nation	Player
4	DF	USA	Austin Berry (on loan to FC Anyang)
18	GK	USA	Zac MacMath (GA, on loan to Colorado Rapids)
19	FW	BIH	Dzenan Catic (on loan to Carolina RailHawks)
22	MF	BRA	Leo Fernandes (on loan to New York Cosmos)
44	MF	USA	Danny Cruz (on loan to Bodø/Glimt)

== Squad breakdown ==
=== Current squad ===
No.	Name	Nationality	Position	Date of birth (age)	Signed from
Goalkeepers
1	Andre Blake	(Jamaica)	GK	November 20, 1990 (age 35)	(United States) UConn
49	Brian Sylvestre	(United States)	GK	December 19, 1992 (age 33)	(United States) Carolina RailHawks
55	John McCarthy	(United States)	GK	July 4, 1992 (age 33)	(United States) Rochester Rhinos
Defenders
2	Warren Creavalle	(United States)	FB/DM	August 14, 1990 (age 35)	(Canada) Toronto
8	Maurice Edu	(United States)	CB/DM	April 18, 1986 (age 39)	(England) Stoke City
15	Ethan White	(United States)	CB	January 1, 1991 (age 35)	(United States) D.C. United
16	Richie Marquez	(United States)	CB	May 26, 1992 (age 33)	(United States) Redlands
23	Steven Vitória	(Portugal)	CB	January 11, 1987 (age 39)	(Portugal) Benfica
28	Ray Gaddis	(United States)	RB	January 13, 1990 (age 36)	(United States) West Virginia University
33	Fabinho	(Brazil)	LB	March 16, 1985 (age 40)	(Australia) Sydney FC
Midfielders
5	Vincent Nogueira	(France)	MF	January 16, 1988 (age 38)	(France) Sochaux
7	Brian Carroll	(United States)	DM	July 20, 1981 (age 44)	(United States) Columbus Crew SC
10	Cristian Maidana	(Argentina)	AM/LW	January 24, 1987 (age 39)	(Argentina) Argentinos Juniors
13	Michael Lahoud	(Sierra Leone)	MF/DM	September 15, 1986 (age 39)	(United States) Chivas USA
14	Eric Ayuk Mbu	(Cameroon)	MF/RW/LW	February 17, 1997 (age 29)	(Cameroon) Rainbow FC Bamenda
20	Jimmy McLaughlin	(United States)	LW/RW	April 30, 1993 (age 32)	(United States) Colgate University
21	Eric Bird	(United States)	MF	April 8, 1993 (age 32)	(United States) University of Virginia
27	Zach Pfeffer	(United States)	MF	January 6, 1995 (age 31)	(United States) IMG Soccer Academy
77	Fred	(Brazil)	MF	August 18, 1979 (age 46)	(Australia) Melbourne Heart
85	Tranquillo Barnetta	(Switzerland)	MF	May 22, 1985 (age 40)	(Germany) Schalke 04
Forwards
6	Conor Casey	(United States)	ST	July 25, 1981 (age 44)	(United States) Colorado Rapids
9	Sebastien Le Toux	(France)	ST	January 10, 1984 (age 42)	(United States) New York Red Bulls
11	Andrew Wenger	(United States)	LW/ST	December 25, 1990 (age 35)	(Canada) Montreal Impact
17	C.J. Sapong	(United States)	ST/RW	December 27, 1988 (age 37)	(United States) Sporting Kansas City
18	Fernando Aristeguieta	(Venezuela)	ST	April 9, 1992 (age 33)	(France) Nantes
29	Antoine Hoppenot	(United States)	ST	November 23, 1990 (age 35)	(United States) Princeton University

Last updated: August 29, 2015.
Source: Philadelphia Union

== Competitions ==
=== Preseason ===
February 4, 2015 Intersquad Scrimmage	Red Team	1–3	Gray Team	Clearwater, Florida
	Sapong 7'	Report	Catic 5'; Pfeffer 12'; Wenger	Stadium: Joe DiMaggio Complex
Note: 30-minute match

February 4, 2015 Intersquad Scrimmage	Red Team	1–0	Gray Team	Clearwater, Florida
	Cruz	Report		Stadium: Joe DiMaggio Complex
Note: 30-minute match

February 7, 2015 Preseason	Jacksonville Armada FC	3–1	Philadelphia Union	Jacksonville, Florida
5:30 p.m. EDT	Ortiz 8'; Keita 11'; Scaglia (yellow card) 43'; Trejo 45' (pen.)	Report	Wenger 23'; Konate (yellow card) 52'; Fabinho (yellow card) 89'	Stadium: EverBank Field; Attendance: 13,934

February 10, 2015 Preseason	Tampa Bay Rowdies	1–0	Philadelphia Union	Clearwater, Florida
6:00 p.m. EDT	Herzog 67' (pen.)	Report	Hoppenot (yellow card) 53'; Pfeffer (yellow card) 78'	Stadium: Joe DiMaggio Complex; Attendance: 2,000

February 18, 2015 Suncoast Pro Classic	Philadelphia Union	3–0	Costa Rica U-23	Bradenton, Florida
2:30 p.m. EDT	Le Toux 10' (pen.), 51'; Maidana 22'	Report		Stadium: IMG Academy

February 21, 2015 Suncoast Pro Classic	Philadelphia Union	6–0	London United	Bradenton, Florida
7:30 p.m. EDT	Marquez 9'; Cruz (yellow card) 20'; Fred 28'; Aristequieta 69', 85'; Wenger 71'; Maidana 79'	Report	Totesaut (yellow card) 49', (red card) 51'	Stadium: IMG Academy
Note: London United are composed of players who are currently out of contract and are searching for professional clubs. They replace Congolese side TP Mazembe in the tournament.

February 25, 2015 Suncoast Pro Classic	Philadelphia Union	1–1 (5–3 p)	Columbus Crew SC	Bradenton, Florida
5:00 p.m. EDT	Aristeguieta 27'; Williams (yellow card) 39'	Report	Steindórsson (yellow card) 39'; Meram 68'	Stadium: IMG Academy
	Penalties
	Fabinho (penalty scored); Fred (penalty scored); Carroll (penalty scored); Casey (penalty scored); Lahoud (penalty scored)		Wahl (penalty scored); Schoenfeld (penalty scored); Meram (penalty missed); Speas (penalty scored)

March 1, 2015 Suncoast Pro Classic Championship Match	Philadelphia Union	3–1	New York Red Bulls	Bradenton, Florida
7:30 p.m. EDT	Wenger 2' 44'; Gaddis (yellow card) 22'; Aristeguieta 32'; Williams (yellow card) 38'	Report	Sam (yellow card) 22'; Wright-Phillips 80'	Stadium: IMG Academy

=== MLS season ===
March 7, 2015 Regular Season	Philadelphia Union	0–0	Colorado Rapids	Chester, Pennsylvania
4:00 p.m. EDT	Vitória (yellow card) 25'; Aristeguieta (yellow card) 90+7'	Report	Burling (yellow card) 24', (red card) 68'; Sjöberg (yellow card) 45'; Serna (yellow card) 73'; Pittinari (yellow card) 90+7'	Stadium: PPL Park; Attendance: 18,002; Referee: Silviu Petrescu

March 14, 2015 Regular Season	Real Salt Lake	3–3	Philadelphia Union	Sandy, Utah
9:30 p.m. EDT	Garcia (yellow card) 4'; Morales 29'; Beckerman (yellow card) 50'; Olave 55'; Mulholland (yellow card) 74'; Saborio 86' (pen.)	Report	Vitória (yellow card) 23'; Aristeguieta 34', 38'; Edu (yellow card) 52'; Olave 58' (o.g.); White (yellow card) 62'; Aristeguieta (yellow card) 86'	Stadium: Rio Tinto Stadium; Attendance: 20,281; Referee: Allen Chapman

March 21, 2015 Regular Season	Philadelphia Union	0–2	FC Dallas	Chester, Pennsylvania
4:00 p.m. EDT	Nogueira (yellow card) 23'; Fabinho (yellow card) 32'; Pfeffer (red card) 42'; Le Toux (yellow card) 86'	Report	Michel (yellow card) 26'; Ulloa (yellow card) 31'; Akindele 49'; Hollingshead 59'; Hollingshead (yellow card) 90+1'	Stadium: PPL Park; Attendance: 16,031; Referee: Jose Carlos Rivero
Note: Game originally scheduled for March 20 at 7pm Eastern, but was moved due to snowy weather in the Philadelphia area.

March 29, 2015 Regular Season	Chicago Fire	1–0	Philadelphia Union	Bridgeview, Illinois
5:00 p.m. EDT	Adaílton 37'; Johnson (yellow card) 80'	Report	Fred (red card) 72'; Edu (yellow card) 90'	Stadium: Toyota Park; Attendance: 12,815; Referee: David Gantar

April 5, 2015 Regular Season	Sporting Kansas City	3–2	Philadelphia Union	Kansas City, Kansas
7:00 p.m. EDT	Dwyer 16' de Jong (yellow card) 18'; Anibaba 90+1'; Németh 90+4'	Report	Peterson 3' (o.g.); Aristeguieta 19'; Edu (yellow card) 62'; Carroll (yellow card) 68'	Stadium: Sporting Park; Attendance: 19,545; Referee: Ismail Elfath

April 11, 2015 Regular Season	Philadelphia Union	2–1	New York City FC	Chester, Pennsylvania
4:00 p.m. EDT	Pfeffer 27'; Lahoud (yellow card) 81'; Nogueira 90+2'	Report	Villa 55'; Watson-Siriboe (yellow card) 85'	Stadium: PPL Park; Attendance: 18,603; Referee: Jair Marrufo

April 16, 2015 Regular Season	New York City FC	1–1	Philadelphia Union	New York City, New York
7:00 p.m. EDT	Grabavoy (yellow card) 25'; Calle (yellow card) 32'; Ballouchy 57', (yellow card) 58'; Watson-Siriboe (yellow card) 73'; Jacobson (yellow card) 87'	Report	Nogueira (yellow card) 22'; Williams (yellow card) 41'; Sapong (yellow card) 67', (goal) 86'	Stadium: Yankee Stadium; Attendance: 20,461; Referee: Baldomero Toledo

April 19, 2015 Regular Season	Philadelphia Union	1–2	New England Revolution	Chester, Pennsylvania
5:00 p.m. EDT	Gaddis (yellow card) 41'; Maidana 42'; Casey (yellow card) 84'; Williams (yellow card) 90'	Report	Nguyen (yellow card) 37'; Davies 64'; Bunbury 76', (yellow card) 90+1'	Stadium: PPL Park; Attendance: 18,106; Referee: Mark Geiger

April 25, 2015 Regular Season	Columbus Crew SC	4–1	Philadelphia Union	Columbus, Ohio
7:30 p.m. EDT	Kamara 21'; Finlay 32', 73'; Meram 44'	Report	Edu (yellow card) 24'; Lahoud (yellow card) 46'; Ayuk 64'	Stadium: Mapfre Stadium; Attendance: 15,553; Referee: Chris Penso

May 2, 2015 Regular Season	Philadelphia Union	0–1	Toronto FC	Chester, Pennsylvania
4:00 p.m. EDT	Gaddis (yellow card) 56'	Report	Giovinco 34'; Hagglund (yellow card) 43'	Stadium: PPL Park; Attendance: 17,859; Referee: Armand Villarreal

May 9, 2015 Regular Season	Vancouver Whitecaps FC	3–0	Philadelphia Union	Vancouver, British Columbia
7:00 p.m. EDT	Morales 32'; Rivero 44'; Techera (yellow card) 80'; Mattocks 81'	Report	Marquez (red card) 78'	Stadium: BC Place; Attendance: 20,183

May 17, 2015 Regular Season	Philadelphia Union	1–0	D.C. United	Chester, Pennsylvania
7:00 p.m. EDT	Williams (yellow card) 31'; White (yellow card) 79'; Pfeffer 90+3'	Report	Kemp (yellow card) 65'	Stadium: PPL Park; Attendance: 16,853; Referee: Alan Kelly

May 24, 2015 Regular Season	New York Red Bulls	0–2	Philadelphia Union	Harrison, New Jersey
5:00 p.m. EDT	Felipe (yellow card) 78'; Ouimette (yellow card) 84'	Report	Nogueira 57', (yellow card) 80'; Sapong 62', (yellow card) 73'; Maidana (yellow card) 78'	Stadium: Red Bull Arena; Attendance: 20,190; Referee: Baldom Toledo

May 30, 2015 Regular Season	D.C. United	2–1	Philadelphia Union	Washington, D.C.
7:00 p.m. EDT	Doyle (yellow card) 44'; Pontius 45+1', (yellow card) 64'; Boswell (yellow card) 59'; Rolfe 85' (pen.)	Report	Le Toux 5'; Nogueira (yellow card) 63'	Stadium: RFK Stadium; Attendance: 16,284; Referee: Ted Unkel

June 3, 2015 Regular Season	Philadelphia Union	3–0	Columbus Crew SC	Chester, Pennsylvania
7:00 p.m. EDT	Sapong 41'; Nogueira 52'; Le Toux 58'; Ayuk (yellow card) 86'	Report	Jiménez (yellow card) 85'	Stadium: PPL Park; Attendance: 15,374; Referee: Jorge Gonzalez

June 6, 2015 Regular Season	Philadelphia Union	1–2	New York City FC	Chester, Pennsylvania
7:00 p.m. EDT	Sapong 46'; Edu (yellow card) 89'	Report	Hernandez (yellow card) 4'; McNamara 53'; Mullins 87'	Stadium: PPL Park; Attendance: 18,517; Referee: Drew Fischer

June 20, 2015 Regular Season	LA Galaxy	5–1	Philadelphia Union	Carson, California
10:30 p.m. EDT	DeLaGarza (yellow card) 6'; Husidic 23'; Juninho 35'; Zardes 56'; Ishizaki 59'; Lletget 65'	Report	Sapong 58'; Fred (yellow card) 88'	Stadium: StubHub Center; Attendance: 23,875; Referee: Kevin Stott

June 24, 2015 Regular Season	Philadelphia Union	1–0	Seattle Sounders FC	Chester, Pennsylvania
7:00 p.m. EDT	Sapong 69'	Report	Remick (yellow card) 30'; Scott (yellow card) 49'	Stadium: PPL Park; Attendance: 18,072; Referee: Edvin Jurisevic

June 27, 2015 Regular Season	Philadelphia Union	2–2	Montreal Impact	Chester, Pennsylvania
7:00 p.m. EDT	Ayuk 8', (yellow card) 62' (red card) 77'; Edu (yellow card) 41', (goal) 75'	Report	Romero (yellow card) 16'; Bernier (yellow card) 22' (red card) 67'; Piatti 28'; McInerney 70'; Toia (yellow card) 72'	Stadium: PPL Park; Attendance: 17,531; Referee: Sorin Stoica

July 11, 2015 Regular Season	Philadelphia Union	3–0	Portland Timbers	Chester, Pennsylvania
7:00 p.m. EDT	Edu (yellow card) 35'; Le Toux (yellow card) 64'; Wenger 69'; Nogueira 71', 82'	Report	Valeri (yellow card) 86'	Stadium: PPL Park; Attendance: 18,722; Referee: Jose Carlos Rivero

July 18, 2015 Regular Season	Toronto FC	2–1	Philadelphia Union	Toronto, Ontario
4:00 p.m. EDT	Delgado 29'; Giovinco 32'	Report	Casey 90+1'	Stadium: BMO Field; Attendance: 25,032; Referee: Jorge Gonzalez

July 26, 2015 Regular Season	D.C. United	3–2	Philadelphia Union	Washington, D.C.
5:00 p.m. EDT	Saborío 37'; DeLeon 66'; Espindola 79'	Report	Sapong 1'; Le Toux 4'; Ayuk (yellow card) 68'	Stadium: RFK Stadium; Referee: Drew Fischer

August 1, 2015 Regular Season	Philadelphia Union	1–3	New York Red Bulls	Chester, Pennsylvania
7:00 p.m. EDT	Le Toux (yellow card) 62', (goal) 73'; Aristeguieta (yellow card) 89'	Report	Perrinelle (yellow card) 51'; Wallace (yellow card) 56'; Kljestan 66' (pen.); Wright-Phillips 74'; Abang 90+4'	Stadium: PPL Park; Attendance: 18,883; Referee: Armand Villarreal

August 8, 2015 Regular Season	Orlando City SC	0–0	Philadelphia Union	Orlando, Florida
7:30 p.m. EDT	Boden (yellow card) 66'	Report		Stadium: Orlando Citrus Bowl Stadium; Attendance: 28,495; Referee: Allen Chapman

August 16, 2015 Regular Season	Philadelphia Union	3–3	Chicago Fire	Chester, Pennsylvania
7:00 p.m. EDT	Aristeguieta 21'; Fabinho 31'; Creavalle (yellow card) 34'; Barnetta (yellow card) 55'; Le Toux 90', (yellow card) 90+1'	Report	Igboananike 9', 90+2'; Nyarko 54', (yellow card) 70'	Stadium: PPL Park; Attendance: 17,608; Referee: Mark Geiger

August 22, 2015 Regular Season	Montreal Impact	0–1	Philadelphia Union	Montreal, Quebec
8:00 p.m. EDT	Donadel (yellow card) 25'; Oduro (yellow card) 90+2'	Report	Fabinho (yellow card) 73'; Le Toux 78'	Stadium: Saputo Stadium; Attendance: 20,801; Referee: Edvin Jurisevic

August 29, 2015 Regular Season	Philadelphia Union	0–1	New England Revolution	Chester, Pennsylvania
7:00 p.m. EDT	Barnetta (yellow card) 38'; Nogueira (yellow card) 49'; Carroll (yellow card) 87'; Maidana (red card) 90+4'	Report	Fagundez 51'; Jones (yellow card) 58'	Stadium: PPL Park; Attendance: 17,117; Referee: Chris Penso

September 5, 2015 Regular Season	San Jose Earthquakes	1–2	Philadelphia Union	San Jose, California
10:30 p.m. EDT	Goodson (yellow card) 52'; Wondolowski 64' (pen.)	Report	Fabinho (yellow card) 63'; Casey 74', 86', (yellow card) 79'	Stadium: Avaya Stadium; Attendance: 18,000; Referee: Ismail Elfath

September 12, 2015 Regular Season	Philadelphia Union	1–2	Columbus Crew SC	Chester, Pennsylvania
7:00 p.m. EDT	Sapong 66'; Vitória (yellow card) 86'	Report	Kamara 21', 26'; Clark (yellow card) 90'	Stadium: PPL Park; Attendance: 17,283; Referee: Jose Carlos Rivero

September 20, 2015 Regular Season	Philadelphia Union	2–0	Houston Dynamo	Chester, Pennsylvania
7:00 p.m. EDT	Barnetta 3'; Sapong 63'	Report	Barnes (yellow card) 14'; Miranda (yellow card) 60'; Garrido (yellow card) 90+1'	Stadium: PPL Park; Attendance: 14,784; Referee: Juan Guzman

September 26, 2015 Regular Season	New England Revolution	1–1	Philadelphia Union	Foxborough, Massachusetts
7:30 p.m. EDT	Nguyen 36' (pen.)	Report	Aristeguieta 65'	Stadium: Gillette Stadium; Attendance: 25,885; Referee: Alan Kelly

October 3, 2015 Regular Season	Toronto FC	3–1	Philadelphia Union	Toronto, Ontario
5:00 p.m. EDT	Giovinco 28'; Altidore 63'; Marquez 90+1' (o.g.)	Report	Vitória (yellow card) 25', (goal) 66'	Stadium: BMO Field; Attendance: 18,332; Referee: Ricard Salazar

October 18, 2015 Regular Season	New York Red Bulls	4–1	Philadelphia Union	Harrison, New Jersey
3:00 p.m. EDT	Grella 1', 17'; Wright-Phillips 4'; Lawrence 44'	Report	Vitória (yellow card) 41'; Le Toux 55'	Stadium: Red Bull Arena; Attendance: 21,080; Referee: Ismail Elfath

October 25, 2015 Regular Season	Philadelphia Union	1–0	Orlando City SC	Chester, Pennsylvania
5:00 p.m. EDT	Richie Marquez (yellow card) 15'; Le Toux 41' (pen.); Gaddis (yellow card) 59'; Nogueira (yellow card) 88'	Report	Shea (yellow card) 20'; Cerén (yellow card) 38'; Boden (yellow card) 42'; Winter (yellow card) 50'; Ramos (yellow card) 69'; Higuita (yellow card) 72' (red card) 86'	Stadium: PPL Park; Attendance: 17,309; Referee: Chris Penso

==== Standings ====
===== Eastern Conference standings =====
Pos	Team	Pld	W	L	T	GF	GA	GD	Pts	Qualification
6	Toronto FC	34	15	15	4	58	58	0	49	MLS Cup Knockout Round
7	Orlando City SC	34	12	14	8	46	56	−10	44	
8	New York City FC	34	10	17	7	49	58	−9	37	
9	Philadelphia Union	34	10	17	7	42	55	−13	37	
10	Chicago Fire	34	8	20	6	43	58	−15	30	

Source: MLS

===== Overall standings =====
Pos	Team	Pld	W	L	T	GF	GA	GD	Pts
16	Real Salt Lake	34	11	15	8	38	48	−10	41
17	New York City FC	34	10	17	7	49	58	−9	37
18	Philadelphia Union	34	10	17	7	42	55	−13	37
19	Colorado Rapids	34	9	15	10	33	43	−10	37
20	Chicago Fire	34	8	20	6	43	58	−15	30

Source: MLS
Rules for classification: 1) points; 2) total wins; 3) total goal differential; 4) total goals scored

=== U.S. Open Cup ===
Philadelphia entered the 2015 U.S. Open Cup with the rest of Major League Soccer in the fourth round.

June 16 4R	Philadelphia Union	0–0 (a.e.t.) (3–1 p)	Rochester Rhinos	Chester, Pennsylvania
7:30 p.m. EDT	Pfeffer (yellow card) 104'	Report	Totsch (yellow card) 80'; McMahon (yellow card) 90'; Walls (yellow card) 98'; Volesky (yellow card) 103'	Stadium: PPL Park; Attendance: 8,000
	Penalties
	Edu (penalty scored); Nogueira (penalty scored); Sapong (penalty missed); Maidana (penalty scored)		Mendoza (penalty scored); Apostolopoulos (penalty missed); Walls (penalty missed); Volesky (penalty missed)

June 30 5R	Philadelphia Union	2–1	D.C. United	Chester, Pennsylvania
7:30 p.m. EDT	Sapong (red card) 24'; Maidana (yellow card) 28'; Mbu 55'; Fabinho 79'	Report	Jeffrey (yellow card) 23'; Arrieta 27'; Birnbaum (yellow card) 30'; Mishu (yellow card) 37'; Doyle (yellow card) 84'	Stadium: PPL Park; Attendance: 7,000

July 21 Quarterfinals	New York Red Bulls	1–1 (a.e.t.) (4–3 p)	Philadelphia Union	Harrison, New Jersey
4:30 p.m. EDT	Sam 90+4'; Miazga (yellow card) 118'	Report	Casey (red card) 40'; Fabinho (yellow card) 52'; Ayuk 56'; Nogueira (yellow card) 68'; Fred (yellow card) 90+1'	Stadium: Red Bull Arena; Attendance: 9,272; Referee: Chris Penso
	Penalties
	Wright-Phillips (penalty missed); McCarty (penalty scored); Grella (penalty scored); Sam (penalty missed); Kljestan (penalty scored)		Williams (penalty scored); Nogueira (penalty scored); Edu (penalty scored); Fred (penalty missed); Aristeguieta (penalty scored)

August 12 Semifinals	Philadelphia Union	1–0	Chicago Fire	Chester, Pennsylvania
7:30 p.m. EDT	Fabinho (yellow card) 30'; Le Toux 74'	Report	Magee (yellow card) 83'; Cociș (yellow card) 85'	Stadium: PPL Park; Attendance: 5,782; Referee: Juan Guzman

September 30 Final	Philadelphia Union	1–1 (a.e.t.) (6–7 p)	Sporting Kansas City	Chester, Pennsylvania
7:00 p.m. EDT	Le Toux 23'	Report	Németh 65'	Stadium: PPL Park; Attendance: 14,463; Referee: Ted Unkel
	Penalties
	Le Toux (penalty scored); Nogueira (penalty scored); Edu (penalty missed); Barnetta (penalty scored); Casey (penalty scored); Lahoud (penalty scored); Gaddis (penalty scored); Wenger (penalty missed)		(penalty scored) Feilhaber; (penalty scored) Dwyer; (penalty missed) Németh; (penalty scored) Besler; (penalty scored) Nagamura; (penalty scored) Zusi; (penalty scored) Ellis; (penalty scored) Quintillà

=== Friendlies ===
June 9 Friendly	Reading United A.C.	0–1	Philadelphia Union	Reading, Pennsylvania
19:00 ET		Report	Wenger 49'	Stadium: Don Thomas Stadium

July 14 International Friendly	Philadelphia Union	1–4	A.F.C. Bournemouth	Chester, Pennsylvania
19:00 ET	Marquez 35'	Report	King 20'; Wilson 26'; Pugh 62'; Rantie 85' (pen.)	Stadium: PPL Park

August 31 Friendly	Harrisburg City Islanders	1–3	Philadelphia Union	Lancaster, Pennsylvania
	Pereira (yellow card) 33'; Jankouskas 44'; Donatelli (yellow card) 75'	Report	White 48'; Maidana 66'; Casey 75'	Stadium: Clipper Magazine Stadium; Attendance: 6,546; Referee: Ryan Dos Reis

=== Statistics ===
Statistics are from all MLS league matches.

Nat.	No.	Player	Pos.	Apps	Starts	G	A	Booked	Sent off (straight red)	Acquired
(United States)	2	Warren Creavalle	DF	2	1	0	0	0	0	SuperDraft
(United States)	3	Raymond Lee	DF	1	0	0	0	0	0	SuperDraft
(France)	5	Vincent Nogueira	MF	20	17	5	0	5	0	Signed
(United States)	6	Conor Casey	FW	11	2	1	0	1	0	Re-Entry Draft
(United States)	7	Brian Carroll	MF	19	18	0	0	2	0	Trade
(United States)	8	Maurice Edu	MF	21	21	1	1	8	0	Signed
(France)	9	Sebastien Le Toux	MF	24	21	6	4	3	0	Trade
(Argentina)	10	Cristian Maidana	MF	24	21	1	14	1	1	Signed
(United States)	11	Andrew Wenger	MF	22	19	1	2	0	0	Trade
(Sierra Leone)	13	Michael Lahoud	MF	12	9	0	0	2	0	Trade
(Cameroon)	14	Eric Ayuk Mbu	MF	22	9	2	2	3	1	Signed
(United States)	15	Ethan White	DF	13	11	0	0	2	0	Trade
(United States)	16	Richie Marquez	DF	15	14	0	0	0	1	SuperDraft
(United States)	17	CJ Sapong	FW	21	14	7	4	2	0	Trade
(Venezuela)	18	Fernando Aristeguieta	FW	16	12	4	1	2	0	Loan
(Bosnia and Herzegovina)	19	Dzenan Catic	FW	0	0	0	0	0	0	SuperDraft
(United States)	20	Jimmy McLaughlin	MF	1	0	0	0	0	0	Signed
(Portugal)	23	Steven Vitória	DF	13	13	0	0	2	0	Loan
(United States)	25	Sheanon Williams	DF	17	15	0	2	3	0	Signed
(United States)	27	Zach Pfeffer	MF	20	10	2	1	0	1	Signed
(United States)	28	Ray Gaddis	DF	23	22	0	0	2	0	SuperDraft
(United States)	29	Antoine Hoppenot	MF	1	0	0	0	0	0	Supplemental Draft
(Brazil)	33	Fabinho	DF	20	17	1	2	1	0	Signed
(Brazil)	77	Fred	MF	6	0	0	0	0	1	Signed
(Switzerland)	85	Tranquillo Barnetta	MF	5	4	0	0	1	0	Signed
						31	33	40	5	

=== Goalkeepers ===
Nat.	No.	Player	Apps	Starts	Record	GA	GAA	SO	Booked	Sent off (straight red)	Acquired
(Jamaica)	1	Andre Blake	2	2	1–1–0	1	0.50	1	0	0	SuperDraft
(United States)	49	Brian Sylvestre	12	12	5-6–1	19	1.58	5	0	0	Signed
(United States)	55	John McCarthy	8	8	1–4–3	15	1.88	1	0	0	Signed
(Algeria)	92	Rais M'Bolhi	5	5	0-3-2	9	1.80	1	0	0	Signed
					7-14-6	44	1.63	8	0	0	

== Honors and awards ==
Week	Player	Opponent	Position	Ref
3	(France) Sebastian Le Toux	D.C. United	FW	
22	(United States) C. J. Sapong (Brazil) Ilsinho (United States) John McCarthy		FW; MF; GK	
24	(Argentina) Cristian Maidana		MF	
29	(Switzerland) Tranquillo Barnetta		MF	

=== End of Season Awards ===
2015 MLS Team Fair Play Award

== Transfers ==
=== In ===
Date	Player	Number	Position	Previous club	Fee/notes
December 8, 2014	(United States) CJ Sapong	17	ST/RW	(United States) Sporting Kansas City	Traded for allocation money and a 2015 SuperDraft pick
January 16, 2015	(Bosnia and Herzegovina) Dzenan Catic	19	ST	(United States) Davenport University	2015 MLS SuperDraft
January 16, 2015	(United States) Eric Bird	21	MF	(United States) University of Virginia	2015 MLS SuperDraft
January 16, 2015	(United States) Raymond Lee	3	LB	(United States) Saint Louis University	2015 MLS SuperDraft
March 3, 2015	(Cameroon) Eric Ayuk Mbu	14	MF	(Cameroon) Rainbow FC	Free
July 29, 2015	(Switzerland) Tranquillo Barnetta	85	MF	(Germany) Schalke 04	Free
August 7, 2015	(United States) Warren Creavalle	3	DM	(Canada) Toronto	Acquired for a 2016 SuperDraft pick

=== Out ===
Date	Player	Number	Position	New club	Fee/notes
December 8, 2014	(United States) Amobi Okugo	14	MF/CB	(United States) Orlando City SC	Traded for allocation money and a 2016 SuperDraft pick
December 8, 2014	(United States) Corben Bone	19	MF	(United States) Wilmington Hammerheads	Waived
December 8, 2014	(Jamaica) Brian Brown	17	ST	(United States) Indy Eleven	Waived
December 8, 2014	(Mexico) Cristhian Hernández	23	MF/FW		Waived
December 10, 2014	(Brazil) Pedro Ribeiro	30	MF/FW	(United States) Orlando City SC	2014 MLS Expansion Draft
February 14, 2015	(United States) Aaron Wheeler	12	ST/CB	(United States) Wilmington Hammerheads	Released
July 23, 2015	(United States) Sheanon Williams	25	RB	(United States) Houston Dynamo	Traded with an international slot for allocation money
July 27, 2015	(Colombia) Carlos Valdes	3	CB	(Colombia) Santa Fe	Mutual Termination
August 24, 2015	(Algeria) Rais Mbolhi	92	GK	(Turkey) Antalyaspor	Mutual Termination
August 29, 2015	(United States) Raymond Lee	3	LB		Waived

=== Loan in ===
Date	Player	Number	Position	Loaned from
February 9, 2015	(Portugal) Steven Vitória	23	CB	(Portugal) Benfica
February 20, 2015	(Venezuela) Fernando Aristeguieta	18	FW	(France) Nantes
May 7, 2015	(United States) Brian Sylvestre	49	GK	(United States) Carolina RailHawks

=== Loan out ===
Date	Player	Number	Position	Loaned to
January 6, 2015	(United States) Zac MacMath	18	GK	(United States) Colorado Rapids
January 15, 2015	(Brazil) Leo Fernandes	22	MF	(United States) New York Cosmos
February 6, 2015	(Colombia) Carlos Valdes	3	CB	(Uruguay) Nacional
March 2, 2015	(United States) Austin Berry	4	CB	(South Korea) FC Anyang
March 18, 2015	(United States) Danny Cruz	44	MF	(Norway) Bodø/Glimt
May 15, 2015	(Bosnia and Herzegovina) Dzenan Catic	19	FW	(United States) Carolina RailHawks
