= Jim Curtin =

American soccer player and coach (born 1979)

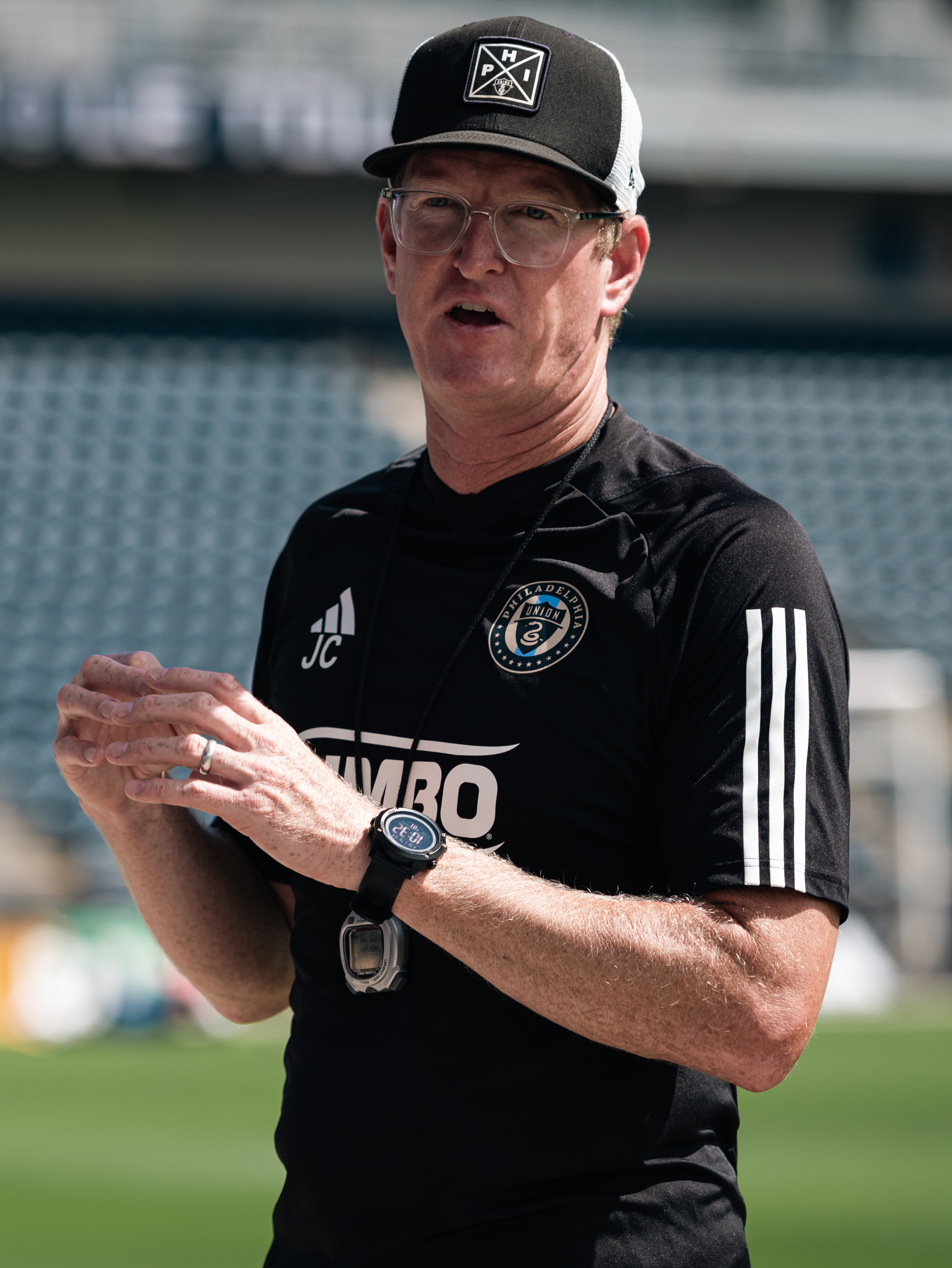
- Curtin in 2023

Personal information
- Date of birth: June 23, 1979 (age 47)
- Place of birth: Oreland, Pennsylvania, U.S.
- Height: 6 ft 4 in (1.93 m)
- Position: Defender

College career
Years	Team	Apps	(Gls)
1997–2000	Villanova Wildcats		

Senior career*
Years	Team	Apps	(Gls)
2001–2008	Chicago Fire	151	(4)
2001	→ Milwaukee Rampage (loan)	3	(0)
2008–2009	Chivas USA	21	(1)
Total		175	(5)

Managerial career
- 2013–2014: Philadelphia Union (assistant)
- 2014–2024: Philadelphia Union
- 2027–: Austin FC
- * Club domestic league appearances and goals

Jim Curtin (born June 23, 1979) is an American professional soccer coach and former player. He will become coach of Major League Soccer club Austin FC at the beginning of the 2027 season. Curtin spent most of his playing career with the Chicago Fire.

== Early life and education ==
Curtin grew up in Oreland, Pennsylvania and played high school soccer at Bishop McDevitt. He excelled in college soccer at Villanova University, where he was named the Big East Rookie of the Year his freshman year and was named a first-team All-Big East selection in both his junior and senior seasons.

== Playing career ==
=== Chicago Fire ===
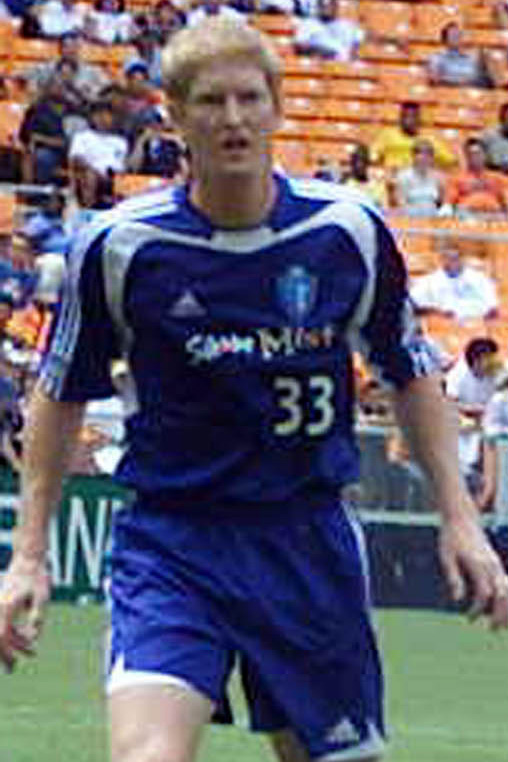
Curtin playing in the 2004 MLS All-Star Game, representing Chicago Fire

Following graduation, Curtin became the first Wildcat to be drafted by the MLS when he was selected by the Chicago Fire. Perceptions that Curtin was not athletic enough to play professionally, and the relative obscurity of Villanova, led to Curtin not being drafted until the third round of the 2001 MLS SuperDraft.

Curtin made his professional debut against D.C. United at Soldier Field during the second week of the 2001 MLS season. Curtin was named to the starting line-up after starting tandem Diego Gutierrez and Andrew Lewis received straight red cards in the opening match against Columbus Crew. In the same season, the Fire sent Curtin on loan to the Milwaukee Rampage in three early-season games and for the USL A-League playoffs. His rookie year saw 12 starts and registering 1,194 minutes.

From his second season onward, Curtin would anchor a starting spot in the Fire's centerback tandem, started 22 games and played 2,121 minutes. Curtin started every game for the Fire in 2003, playing alongside Carlos Bocanegra and helped the team's defense compensate for Bocanegra's loss in 2004. He would go on to play in more than 200 games for the Fire, which included U.S. Open Cup championships in 2003 and 2006. He was also named 2004 MLS All-Star and the March of Dimes/Comcast Athlete of the Year in 2005.

In 2014, while serving as head coach of the Philadelphia Union, Curtin was ceremonially retired as a Chicago Fire player.

=== Chivas USA ===
On February 7, 2008, one day after his daughter Ryan was born he was traded to Chivas USA for a conditional pick in the 2010 MLS SuperDraft. After two seasons in southern California, Curtin was waived by Chivas USA on January 26, 2010.

== Coaching career ==
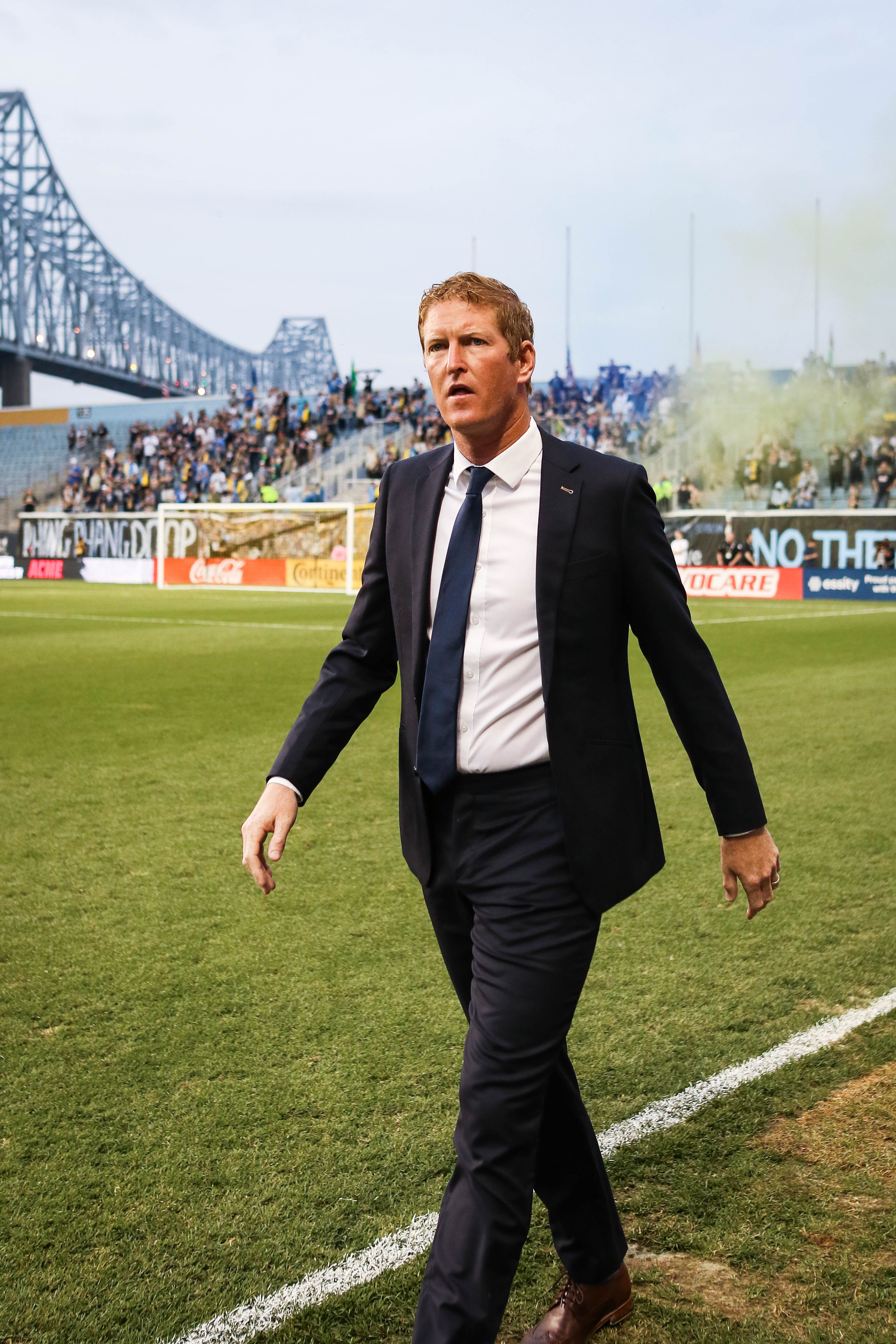
Curtin in 2013

=== Philadelphia Union ===
After departing Chivas, Curtin returned to the Philadelphia region and began working with the newly formed Philadelphia Union as a coach in the academy system in June 2010. In November 2012, Curtin was named assistant coach for his hometown Philadelphia Union, under John Hackworth and alongside Brendan Burke and Rob Vartughian.

During the 2014 season, Hackworth was fired after a run of poor results with Curtin being named interim coach during the team's search for a permanent replacement. The Union saw a turnaround of form under Curtin, losing only 5 of the remaining 16 matches in the season and advanced to the U.S. Open Cup final, ultimately finishing runners-up to Seattle Sounders FC in extra time. This success was rewarded on November 7, 2014, the Philadelphia Union announced that Curtin would take the reins as the head coach; removing the "interim" title he had held previously.

The 2015 season still saw the Union struggle during the regular season but made a second consecutive appearance in the U.S. Open Cup final, losing this one to penalty kicks at home to Sporting Kansas City.

Near the end of the 2015 season, the Union fired Nick Sakiewicz as CEO and appoint Earnie Stewart as "Sporting Director" to work with Curtin and address the team's struggles. Initial improvements saw the Union returning to the post-season in 2016 for the first time since the 2011 season. During this season, with a win over rivals New York City FC on April 23, 2016, Curtin set a record five consecutive home wins as well as becoming the highest wins coach in Union history.

The Union were unable to build on their 2016 success, finishing with the same record but still missing the playoffs in 2017. Curtin was announced to retain his head coach position for the 2018 season.

Ahead of the 2019 season, Union Sporting Director, Ernst Tanner, announced that Curtin would be retained for the upcoming season on a one-year extension. By July of that season, the Union reach first place in the Eastern Conference and hitting the club's best start to a season. This success led to the club announcing Curtin signed a two-year contract extension, to remain head coach through the 2021 season.

The 2020 season was the most successful to date for the Union and Curtin's coaching career. Despite disruptions from the COVID-19 pandemic, the Union reached the semi-final of the MLS is Back Tournament and went on to won their first trophy finishing top of the league standings and earning the 2020 Supporters' Shield. The team's performance over the season earned Curtin his first Sigi Schmid Coach of the Year Award. Winning the Supporter's Shield earned the Union their debut in the CONCACAF Champions League, where the Union earned their first international win against Deportivo Saprissa; a victory that marked Curtin's 100th win as head coach of the club.

On November 7, 2024, after a season in which the Union failed to qualify for the postseason for the first time since 2017, it was announced that the club had parted ways with Curtin.

=== Austin FC ===
On June 8, 2026, it was announced that Curtin would become coach of Texas-based Austin FC following the conclusion of the 2026 MLS season.

== Coaching statistics ==
As of match played October 19, 2024

Coaching record by team and tenure
Team	Nat	From	To	Record							
Team	Nat	From	To	G	W	D	L	GF	GA	GD	Win %
Philadelphia Union	(United States)	June 10, 2014	November 7, 2024	420	176	111	133	682	550	+132	41.90
Total				420	176	111	133	682	550	+132	41.90

== Honors ==
=== Player ===
Chicago Fire

- Supporters' Shield: 2003
- U.S. Open Cup: 2003, 2006

=== Coach ===
Philadelphia Union

- Supporters' Shield: 2020
- MLS Cup runner-up: 2022
- U.S. Open Cup runner-up: 2014, 2015, 2018

=== Individual ===
- Big East Rookie of the Year: 1997
- All-Big East Selection: 1999, 2000
- Philadelphia Soccer Seven Player of the Year: 2000
- MLS All-Star: 2004
- Chicago Fire Defender of the Year: 2004
- Villanova University Hall of Fame: Class of 2017
- MLS Coach of the Year: 2020, 2022
