= John McCarthy (soccer) =

American soccer player (born 1992)

- McCarthy with the New York Red Bulls in 2026

Personal information
- Full name: John Joseph McCarthy III
- Date of birth: July 4, 1992 (age 34)
- Place of birth: Philadelphia, Pennsylvania, United States
- Height: 6 ft 1 in (1.85 m)
- Position: Goalkeeper

Team information
- Current team: New York Red Bulls
- Number: 77

College career
Years	Team	Apps	(Gls)
2010–2013	La Salle Explorers	74	(0)

Senior career*
Years	Team	Apps	(Gls)
2011–2012	Ocean City Nor'easters	22	(0)
2013	Reading United	7	(0)
2014	Rochester Rhinos	18	(0)
2015–2018	Philadelphia Union	21	(0)
2016–2018	→ Bethlehem Steel (loan)	26	(0)
2019	Tampa Bay Rowdies	29	(0)
2020–2021	Inter Miami	21	(0)
2022–2023	Los Angeles FC	26	(0)
2024–2025	LA Galaxy	43	(0)
2025–	New York Red Bulls	1	(0)
- * Club domestic league appearances and goals as of October 24, 2025

John Joseph McCarthy III (born July 4, 1992) is an American professional soccer player who plays as a goalkeeper for Major League Soccer club New York Red Bulls. As a youth McCarthy was the Goalkeeper for his High School team Northeast Catholic Falcons and in 2008 helped lead them to a Catholic League and City Championship. He was inducted into the "North Catholic Soccer Hall of Fame" in 2026.

== Career ==
=== College and amateur ===
McCarthy played four years of college soccer at La Salle University between 2010 and 2013, Where he holds numerous career records, including most games played (74), saves (468), and shutouts (28). He was awarded Atlantic 10 All-Conference Second Team in 2011 and 2012, as well as Atlantic 10 All-Conference First Team in 2013.

While at college, McCarthy also appeared for USL PDL clubs Ocean City Nor'easters in 2011 and 2012, and Reading United AC in 2013.

=== Professional ===
==== Rochester Rhinos ====
McCarthy signed his first professional deal with USL Pro club Rochester Rhinos on February 27, 2014. After the 2014 season, McCarthy was named the Rhinos' Rookie of the Year as he led the league with 0.72 goals against average.

McCarthy was named USL PRO Goalkeeper of the Year and USL PRO Rookie of the Year for his notable 2014 season performances.

==== Philadelphia Union ====
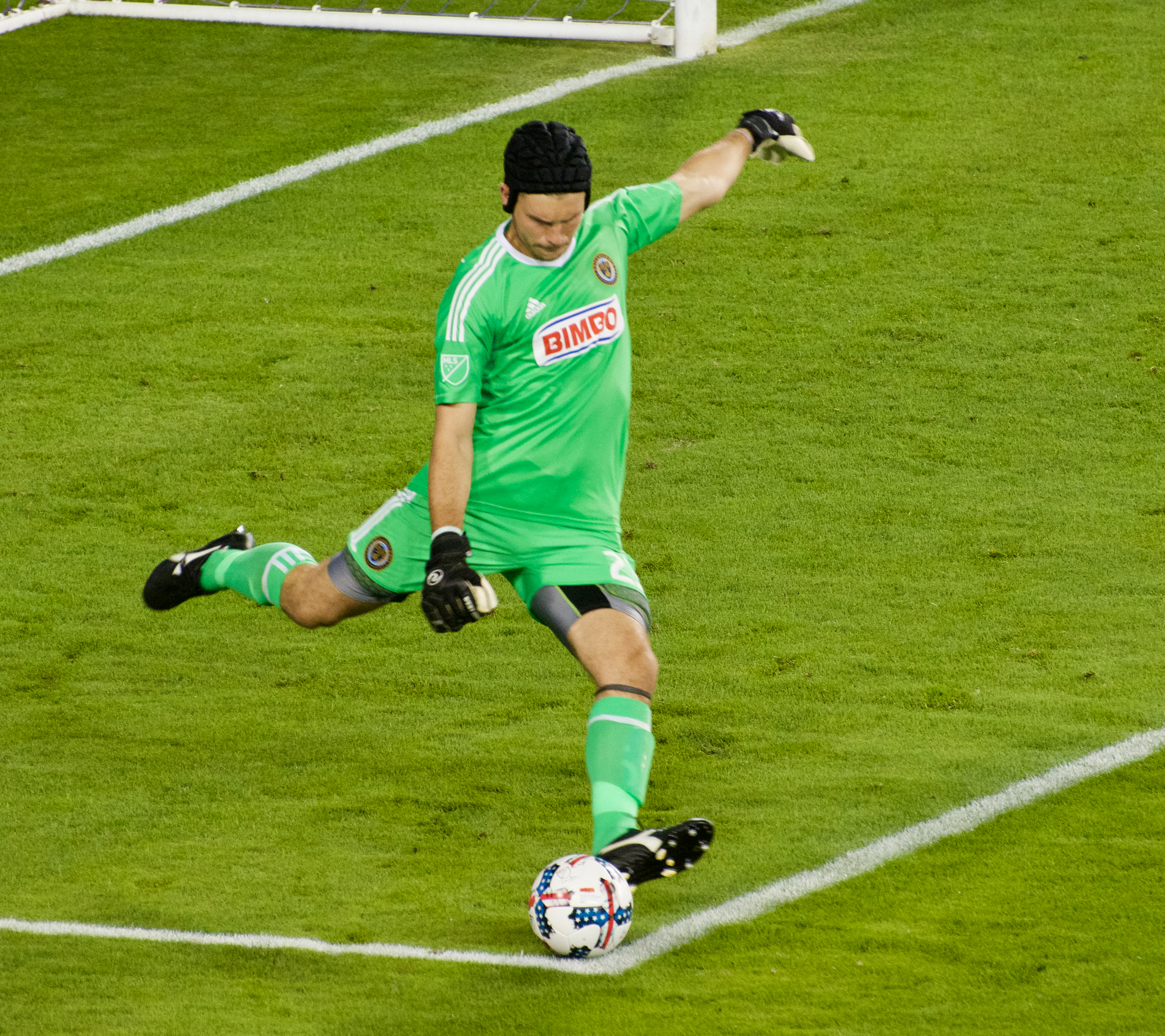

In 2015, McCarthy signed with his hometown club, Philadelphia Union. Originally signed as a third goalkeeper behind first round draft pick, Andre Blake, and designated player, Rais M'Bohli, McCarthy was given a starting role as a result of injury and poor form, respectively. He made his MLS debut as the starter for the Union on April 11, 2015, versus New York City FC. McCarthy was heralded for his performance which resulted in his first win in the topflight as well as the Union's first win of 2015 season. McCarthy started 8 league matches during the 2015 season, posting one shutout. He was played mostly during the Union's 2015 U.S. Open Cup run, earning wins in the first four rounds of competition (including two penalty shootouts) ultimately losing in the final. On July 6, 2017, McCarthy started in an away game against Sporting Kansas City which resulted in a 1–1 draw. McCarthy made five noteworthy saves in the game, including an excellent foot save on Latif Blessing in the 70th minute.

The conclusion of the 2018 season was also the end of McCarthy's Union contract, concluding his time with his hometown team.

==== Bethlehem Steel FC ====
For the 2016 season, McCarthy played on loan to the Union's USL club, Bethlehem Steel FC. He made 11 starts for the club and posted 5 shutouts for Steel FC's inaugural season.

==== Tampa Bay Rowdies ====
McCarthy signed with the Tampa Bay Rowdies on January 31, 2019. During his season with the Rowdies, McCarthy made 26 appearances and posted 10 clean sheets.

==== Inter Miami ====
In December 2019, McCarthy joined MLS expansion side Inter Miami CF ahead of their inaugural 2020 season. He made his debut for Miami on October 7, in a 2–1 victory over New York Red Bulls. Following the 2021 season, McCarthy's contract option was declined by Miami.

==== Los Angeles FC ====
On January 21, 2022, McCarthy joined Los Angeles FC for the 2022 season with an option for 2023. He was subbed on in the MLS Cup 2022 against the Union due to the sent-off of Maxime Crépeau in the 117th minute and made two saves during the penalty shoot-out to win the maiden MLS title for LAFC. McCarthy was named the game's Most Valuable Player as a result of his performance.

==== LA Galaxy ====
On January 5, 2024, McCarthy was transferred to cross-city rivals LA Galaxy. He ended the season with another MLS Cup title, after defeating the New York Red Bulls in the MLS Cup 2024.

==== New York Red Bulls ====
On August 22, 2025, the New York Red Bulls announced that they had acquired McCarthy from LA Galaxy via trade. The Galaxy would receive a third-round pick in the MLS SuperDraft and $150,000 in General Allocation Money (GAM).

== Career statistics ==
As of match played April 29, 2026

Appearances and goals by club, season and competition
Club	Season	League			U.S. Open Cup		Continental		Other		Total	
Club	Season	Division	Apps	Goals	Apps	Goals	Apps	Goals	Apps	Goals	Apps	Goals
Ocean City Nor'easters	2011	Premier Development League	8	0	—		—		—		8	0
Ocean City Nor'easters	2012	Premier Development League	14	0	—		—		—		14	0
Ocean City Nor'easters	Total		22	0	—		—		—		22	0
Reading United	2013	Premier Development League	7	0	3	0	—		—		10	0
Rochester Rhinos	2014	USL Pro	18	0	3	0	—		1 (Note: Appearances in USL Pro play-offs)	0	22	0
Philadelphia Union	2015	Major League Soccer	11	0	5	0	—		—		16	0
Philadelphia Union	2016	Major League Soccer	1	0	1	0	—		—		2	0
Philadelphia Union	2017	Major League Soccer	8	0	2	0	—		—		10	0
Philadelphia Union	2018	Major League Soccer	1	0	1	0	—		—		2	0
Philadelphia Union	Total		21	0	9	0	—		—		30	0
Bethlehem Steel (loan)	2016	United Soccer League	11	0	—		—		—		11	0
Bethlehem Steel (loan)	2017	United Soccer League	3	0	—		—		—		3	0
Bethlehem Steel (loan)	2018	United Soccer League	12	0	—		—		—		12	0
Bethlehem Steel (loan)	Total		26	0	—		—		—		26	0
Tampa Bay Rowdies	2019	USL Championship	29	0	—		—		1 (Note: Appearances in USL Championship play-offs)	0	30	0
Inter Miami	2020	Major League Soccer	8	0	—		—		1 (Note: Appearance(s) in MLS Cup playoffs)	0	9	0
Inter Miami	2021	Major League Soccer	13	0	—		—		—		13	0
Inter Miami	Total		21	0	—		—		1	0	22	0
Los Angeles FC	2022	Major League Soccer	1	0	1	0	—		1	0	3	0
Los Angeles FC	2023	Major League Soccer	25	0	—		8 (Note: Appearances in CONCACAF Champions League)	0	3 (Note: Appearances in Leagues Cup)	0	36	0
Los Angeles FC	Total		26	0	1	0	8	0	4	0	39	0
LA Galaxy	2024	Major League Soccer	32	0	—		—		6 (Note: Five appearances in MLS Cup playoffs, one appearance in Leagues Cup)	0	38	0
LA Galaxy	2025	Major League Soccer	11	0	—		4 (Note: Appearances in CONCACAF Champions Cup)	0	0	0	15	0
LA Galaxy	Total		43	0	—		4	0	10	0	53	0
New York Red Bulls	2025	Major League Soccer	1	0	—		—		—		1	0
New York Red Bulls	2026	Major League Soccer	0	0	2	0	—		—		2	0
New York Red Bulls	Total		1	0	2	0	—		—		3	0
Career total			214	0	18	0	12	0	13	0	257	0

== Honors ==
Los Angeles FC

- MLS Cup: 2022
- Supporters' Shield: 2022

LA Galaxy

- MLS Cup: 2024

Individual

- United Soccer League Rookie of the Year: 2014
- United Soccer League Goalkeeper of the Year: 2014
- United Soccer League All-League First Team: 2014
- MLS Cup MVP: 2022
- CONCACAF Champions League Golden Glove: 2023
- CONCACAF Champions League Best XI: 2023
