= Tranquillo Barnetta =

Swiss footballer (born 1985)

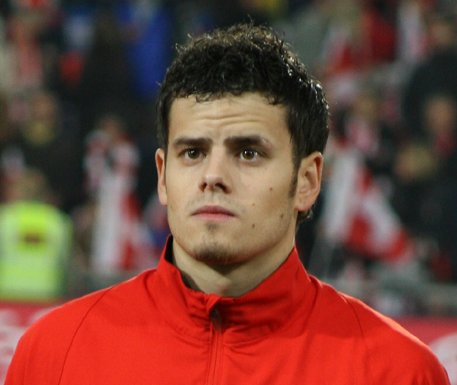
- Barnetta with Switzerland in 2006

Personal information
- Full name: Tranquillo Barnetta
- Date of birth: 22 May 1985 (age 41)
- Place of birth: St. Gallen, Switzerland
- Height: 1.78 m (5 ft 10 in)
- Position: Midfielder

Youth career
- 1991–1996: FC Rotmonten St. Gallen
- 1996–2002: St. Gallen

Senior career*
Years	Team	Apps	(Gls)
2002–2004	St. Gallen	60	(15)
2004–2012	Bayer Leverkusen	187	(23)
2004–2005	→ Hannover 96 (loan)	7	(2)
2012–2015	Schalke 04	44	(3)
2013–2014	→ Eintracht Frankfurt (loan)	22	(1)
2015–2016	Philadelphia Union	41	(6)
2017–2019	St. Gallen	60	(11)
Total		421	(61)

International career
2002	Switzerland U17	6	(0)
2004–2014	Switzerland	75	(10)
Medal record
Representing Switzerland
Men's Football
UEFA European Under-17 Championship
Winner	2002 Denmark
- * Club domestic league appearances and goals

Tranquillo Barnetta (Italian pronunciation: [traŋˈkwillo barˈnetta]; born 22 May 1985) is a Swiss former professional footballer who played as a midfielder.

He was usually deployed out wide as a left winger but could also play in the centre as an attacking midfielder, or even in a more withdrawn role as a central midfielder. Barnetta was known for his "extreme pace, mobility and creativity". Prior to moving to MLS, Barnetta played football for several Swiss and German clubs. At international level, he has amassed 75 caps for the Swiss national team, representing his nation in three FIFA World Cups, and two UEFA European Football Championships.

== Playing career ==
=== Club ===
==== St. Gallen ====
Barnetta started his career with his hometown team, St. Gallen for the 2002–2003 season. During his first professional season, he earned 30 appearances and scored 5 goals.

==== Bayer Leverkusen ====
Barnetta's debut season in Switzerland was noticed abroad and was soon snapped up by German side Bayer Leverkusen in January 2004. During his first season at Bayer, he had a loan spell at Hannover 96, returning to Bayer in March 2005.

After a good showing at the World Cup in Germany, Barnetta became a regular in the Bayer squad. The 2008–09 season was one to forget for him, after Bayer finished two places lower than the previous season and his goals tally dropped slightly. During the summer transfer window, he was linked with a move away from Bayer as his place in the squad seemed under threat from loanee Toni Kroos. Barnetta regained his good form in the 2009–10 season, scoring a brace in only his second league game of the season and contributing to Bayer's unbeaten run for the entire first half of the season.

==== Schalke 04/Eintracht Frankfurt ====
On 2 July 2012, after his contract ran out at Bayer Leverkusen, Schalke 04 confirmed that Barnetta signed a three-year professional contract with them until 30 June 2015, and in preparation for the Gelsenkirchen club's participation in the Champions League. The transfer was reported as a free transfer by Schalke's sport and communications manager Horst Heldt. Barnetta was assigned a number 27 shirt, previously worn by Ciprian Deac. In the 2013–14 season, Barnetta had a season long loan spell at Eintracht Frankfurt, returning to Schalke 04 in June 2014 whom he signed for at the end of the 2011–12 season.

On 23 September 2014, Barnetta scored his first goal for Schalke in his second league match of the 2014–15 season.

==== Philadelphia Union ====
On 29 July 2015, Barnetta signed with the Philadelphia Union. Integrating with the Union, who were midway through their season, Barnetta netted his first goal on 20 September, in a home win against the Houston Dynamo.

After a full preseason with the Union, Barnetta led the team as the attacking playmaker during the 2016 season. Registering 5 goals and 4 assists, he helped lead Philadelphia's return to the MLS Cup Playoffs for the first time since 2011. Prior to the conclusion of the 2016 campaign, the Union announced Barnetta would return to Switzerland to rejoin FC St. Gallen. Barnetta cited he wanted to contribute to his hometown club in front of friends and family while he still had the fitness to do so meaningfully. He finished his Philadelphia career with 45 appearances and 6 goals.

==== Return to St. Gallen ====
Barnetta signed a contract with St. Gallen on 14 November 2016, starting from 1 January 2017.

At the end of the 2018–19 season, Barnetta decided to retire.

=== International ===
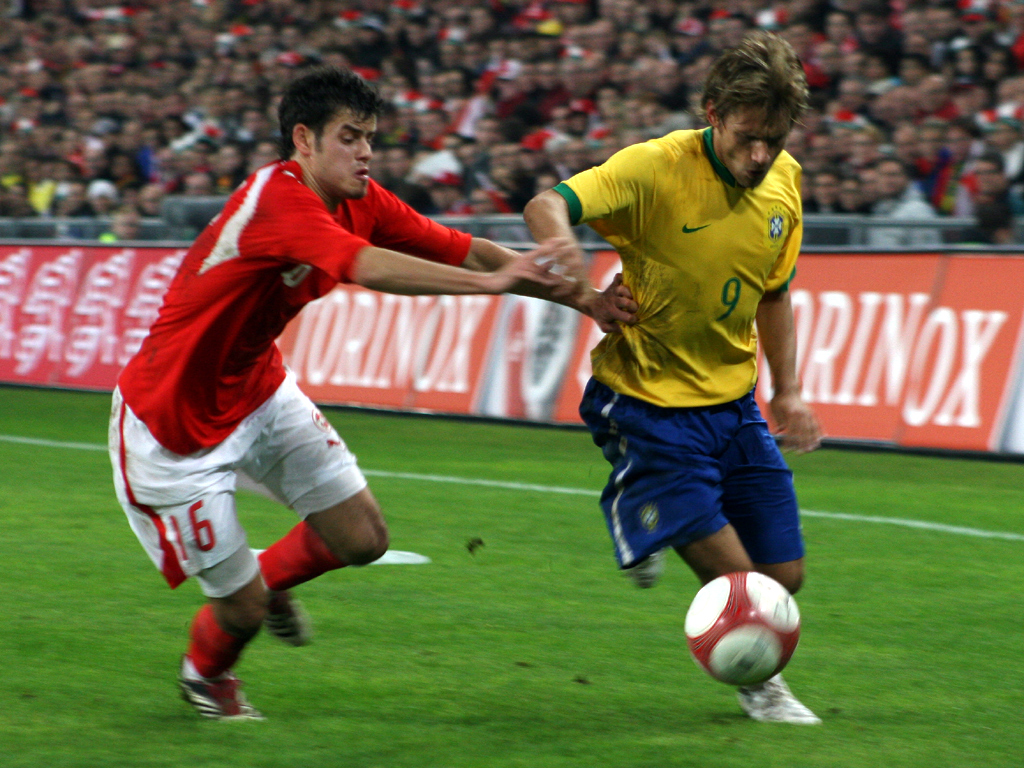
Barnetta challenging Rafael Sóbis in a friendly against Brazil in 2006

Barnetta is a former youth international and was in the Swiss U-17 squad that won the 2002 U-17 European Championships along with future senior teammates Philippe Senderos and Reto Ziegler. He has been a member of the senior national team and was first called up to the squad for the Euro 2004 but did not make an appearance. Barnetta was called up to the squad after Johann Lonfat was injured and Davide Chiumiento had turned down a call up as the first choice replacement. At the 2006 World Cup, he scored the second goal in Switzerland's group stage win over Togo, but missed a penalty kick in the shootout against Ukraine, which Switzerland lost 3–0. On 4 July, Barnetta was shortlisted for the tournament's Best Young Player award. He was ever present in 2010 World Cup qualifying as the Swiss secured a place by finishing top of their group. On 4 June 2011, Barnetta scored two free kicks in quick succession against England in the Euro 2012 qualifiers. Barnetta was called up to represent Switzerland at the 2014 FIFA World Cup in Brazil, but he didn't play any matches.

== Playing style ==
Known for his "extreme pace, mobility and creativity" on the left flank, FIFA's official website describes Barnetta as a "primarily a creative footballer", who also "covers ground and closes down opponents on the football pitch with the sort tireless energy and dogged determination one might expect from a tigerish central midfielder". Barnetta is regarded for bringing "drive, skill and maturity" to the Swiss national team.

== Personal life ==
Barnetta was born in St. Gallen. Both his parents are of Italian descent and he holds both Swiss and Italian citizenship.

Since retiring from professional football, Barnetta has become a stay-at-home dad, taking care of their two children while his wife works as a physician.

== Career statistics ==
=== Club ===
Club	Season	League			Cup		Continental		Other		Total		Ref.
Club	Season	Division	App.	Goals	App.	Goals	App.	Goals	App.	Goals	App.	Goals	Ref.
St. Gallen	Swiss Super League	2002–03	30	10							30	10	
St. Gallen	Swiss Super League	2003–04	30	5							30	5	
St. Gallen	Total		60	15	0	0	0	0	0	0	60	15	
Hannover 96 (loan)	Bundesliga	2004–05	7	2	2	0	0	0	0	0	9	2	
Bayer Leverkusen	Bundesliga	2005–06	31	6	1	0	2	0	1	0	35	6	
Bayer Leverkusen	Bundesliga	2006–07	30	1	2	1	9	0	0	0	41	2	
Bayer Leverkusen	Bundesliga	2007–08	32	6	1	0	11	1	0	0	44	7	
Bayer Leverkusen	Bundesliga	2008–09	31	4	6	1	0	0	0	0	37	5	
Bayer Leverkusen	Bundesliga	2009–10	32	4	2	0	0	0	0	0	34	4	
Bayer Leverkusen	Bundesliga	2010–11	24	2	1	0	6	0	0	0	31	2	
Bayer Leverkusen	Bundesliga	2011–12	7	0	0	0	0	0	0	0	7	0	
Bayer Leverkusen	Total		187	23	13	2	28	1	1	0	229	26	
Schalke 04	Bundesliga	2012–13	21	0	3	0	7	0	0	0	31	0	
Schalke 04	Bundesliga	2013–14	1	0	1	0	0	0	0	0	2	0	
Schalke 04	Bundesliga	2014–15	22	3	1	0	4	0	0	0	27	3	
Schalke 04	Total		44	3	5	0	11	0	0	0	60	3	
Eintracht Frankfurt (loan)	Bundesliga	2013–14	22	1	2	0	7	0	0	0	31	1	
Philadelphia Union	MLS	2015	11	1	2	0	–		–		13	1	
Philadelphia Union	MLS	2016	30	5	2	0	–		–		32	5	
Philadelphia Union	Total		41	6	4	0	0	0	0	0	45	6	
St. Gallen	Swiss Super League	2016–17	16	1	0	0	0	0	0	0	16	1	
St. Gallen	Swiss Super League	2017–18	19	1	2	1	0	0	0	0	21	2	
St. Gallen	Swiss Super League	2018–19	25	9	3	0	0	0	0	0	28	9	
St. Gallen	Total		60	11	5	1	0	0	0	0	65	12	
Career total			421	61	31	3	46	1	1	0	499	65	

=== International ===
National team	Year	App.	Goals
Switzerland national team	2004	2	0
Switzerland national team	2005	8	0
Switzerland national team	2006	10	3
Switzerland national team	2007	10	3
Switzerland national team	2008	10	0
Switzerland national team	2009	9	0
Switzerland national team	2010	9	0
Switzerland national team	2011	1	2
Switzerland national team	2012	7	2
Switzerland national team	2013	6	0
Switzerland national team	2014	3	0
Total		75	10

=== International goals ===
List of international goals scored by Tranquillo Barnetta
#	Date	Venue	Opponent	Score	Result	Competition	Report
1.	1 March 2006	Hampden Park, Glasgow	Scotland	1–0	3–1	Friendly	
2.	27 May 2006	St. Jakob-Park, Basel	Ivory Coast	1–0	1–1	Friendly	
3.	19 June 2006	Westfalenstadion, Dortmund	Togo	2–0	2–0	2006 World Cup	
4.	22 August 2007	Stade de Genève, Geneva	Netherlands	1–0 (penalty)	2–1	Friendly	
5.	22 August 2007	Stade de Genève, Geneva	Netherlands	2–0	2–1	Friendly	
6.	7 September 2007	Ernst Happel Stadion, Vienna	Chile	1–0	2–1	Friendly	
7.	4 June 2011	Wembley Stadium, London	England	1–0	2–2		
8.	4 June 2011	Wembley Stadium, London	England	2–0	2–2		
9.	15 August 2012	Stadion Poljud, Split	Croatia	2–1	4–2	Friendly	
10.	16 October 2012	Laugardalsvöllur, Reykjavík	Iceland	1–0	2–0	2014 FIFA World Cup qualification	

== Honors ==
Bayer Leverkusen

- DFB-Pokal runner-up: 2008–09

Switzerland U17

- UEFA European Under-17 Championship: 2002

Individual

- 2016 MLS Team of the Week: Week 8, Week 23
