= Andrew Wenger =

American soccer player (born 1990)

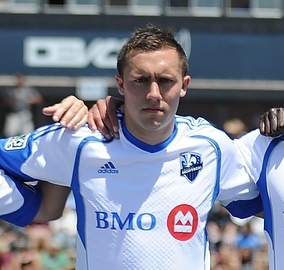
- Wenger in 2013 with Montréal

Personal information
- Full name: James Andrew Wenger
- Date of birth: December 25, 1990 (age 35)
- Place of birth: Lancaster, Pennsylvania, United States
- Height: 6 ft 0 in (1.83 m)
- Positions: Winger; forward

Youth career
- 2006–2009: PA Classics

College career
Years	Team	Apps	(Gls)
2009–2011	Duke Blue Devils	63	(21)

Senior career*
Years	Team	Apps	(Gls)
2010	Reading United	13	(1)
2011	Carolina Dynamo	8	(2)
2012–2014	Montreal Impact	51	(6)
2014–2015	Philadelphia Union	54	(7)
2016–2018	Houston Dynamo	76	(10)
2018	→ Rio Grande Valley FC (loan)	1	(0)
Total		203	(26)

International career
2008–2009	United States U20	2	(0)
- * Club domestic league appearances and goals

James Andrew Wenger (born December 25, 1990) is an American former professional soccer player who played for eight seasons in Major League Soccer.

== College and amateur career ==
Wenger made an immediate impact in his first year at Duke University. He started in all 21 matches, and finished with four goals and three assists in a team-leading 1,896 minutes of action. In 2010, Wenger started in all of Duke's matches at center back and was a semi-finalist for the Hermann Trophy. In 2011, Wenger moved from center back to forward. He led the ACC with 17 goals and 42 points and was ranked fourth in the nation in total points and sixth in total goals, earning him the Hermann Trophy.

In addition to being named Hermann Trophy winner for 2011, Wenger won ACC Freshman of the Year in 2009, ACC Defensive Player of the Year in 2010, and ACC Offensive Player of the Year in 2011.

Wenger also played in the USL Premier Development League for Reading United and the Carolina Dynamo.

== Professional career ==
=== Montreal Impact ===
Wenger was selected No. 1 overall in the 2012 MLS SuperDraft by the Montreal Impact. He made his MLS and Impact debut on March 10, 2012, coming on a substitute in a 2–0 loss to the Vancouver Whitecaps. His first goal for the Impact came on April 7, 2012, in a Canadian Classique match against Toronto FC, the Impact's biggest rival. With the score tied at 1, Wenger scored in the 81st minute to give the Impact their first ever win over their rivals.

In 2013, Wenger made 24 league appearances and helped the Impact reach the MLS Playoffs for the first time in club history. However Wenger and the Impact would lose 3–0 to the Houston Dynamo in the knockout round of the playoffs. Wenger made four appearances as the Impact won the 2013 Canadian Championship. Wenger made his CONCACAF Champions League debut on August 21, 2013, against Heredia and would score his first goal in the competition on September 24, 2013, also against Heredia.

=== Philadelphia Union ===
On April 4, 2014, the Philadelphia Union acquired from the Impact via trade in exchange for Jack McInerney. He made his Union debut and scored his first Union goal on April 12 in a 2–2 draw with Real Salt Lake. He made 5 appearances and scored 2 goals to help the Union reach the 2014 US Open Cup final. However they would fall to the Seattle Sounders in extra time.

In 2015, Wenger would help the Union return to the Open Cup final. This time they would take the match to penalties, but would lose to Sporting Kansas City.

=== Houston Dynamo ===
On December 7, 2015, Wenger was traded to the Houston Dynamo along with his teammate Cristian Maidana in exchange for allocation money and the No. 6 selection in the 2016 MLS SuperDraft. He scored his first goal for the club in his debut, a 3–3 draw against the New England Revolution on March 6. On March 12 he helped the Dynamo record a 5–0 victory over FC Dallas in a Texas Derby by recording 2 assists and a goal. His performance saw him named to the MLS Team of the Week for week 2. He would finish the 2016 season with a career and team high 6 goals.

2017 saw the arrival of wingers Alberth Elis, Romell Quioto, and Vicente Sánchez to Houston. The increased competition led Wenger to start half as many games as the previous year. However, Wenger was able to help the Dynamo qualify for the playoffs for the first time since 2013. The team would reach the Western Conference Finals, but Wenger would not feature in the playoffs.

Wenger got off to a great start in 2018, scoring 1 and assisting 1 in a 4–0 win over Atlanta United in the first game of the season. Due to injuries to right backs A.J. DeLaGarza and Kevin Garcia, Wenger was forced to play right back for much of the season. Wenger picked up an injury on June 9 that forced him to miss four games. He went on loan to the Dynamo's USL affiliate Rio Grande Valley FC to regain match fitness before returning to the Dynamo on July 25, a 3–1 loss to the Union. The Dynamo missed out on the playoffs, however they would win the 2018 US Open Cup, their first in club history. Wenger, playing at right back, would start in the Open Cup final and helped hold his former team scoreless as the Dynamo won 3–0 over the Union.

On November 30, 2018, Wenger announced his retirement from soccer.

== Personal life ==
Wenger's younger brother Jonathan played college soccer at Elon and his younger sister Elizabeth played college soccer at Georgetown and was the 17th overall pick in the 2018 NWSL College Draft.

== Career statistics ==
Appearances and goals by club, season and competition
Club	Season	League			Cup (Note: Appearances in Canadian Championship, and US Open Cup)		Playoffs		Continental		Total	
Club	Season	Division	Apps	Goals	Apps	Goals	Apps	Goals	Apps	Goals	Apps	Goals
Reading United	2010	USL PDL	13	1	1	0	0	0	–		14	1
Carolina Dynamo	2011	USL PDL	8	2	1	0	0	0	–		9	2
Montreal Impact	2012	MLS	23	4	0	0	–		–		23	4
Montreal Impact	2013	MLS	24	1	4	1	1	0	3	1	32	3
Montreal Impact	2014	MLS	4	1	–		–		–		4	1
Montreal Impact	Total		51	6	4	1	1	0	3	1	59	8
Philadelphia Union	2014	MLS	28	6	5	2	–		–		33	8
Philadelphia Union	2015	MLS	26	1	3	0	–		–		29	1
Philadelphia Union	Total		54	7	8	2	0	0	0	0	62	9
Houston Dynamo	2016	MLS	32	6	2	0	–		–		34	6
Houston Dynamo	2017	MLS	22	2	2	1	0	0	"|–		24	3
Houston Dynamo	2018	MLS	22	2	2	1	–		–		24	3
Houston Dynamo	Total		76	10	6	2	0	0	0	0	82	12
Rio Grande Valley FC (loan)	2018	USL	1	0	–		–		–		1	0
Career total			203	26	20	5	1	0	3	1	227	32

== Honors ==
Montreal Impact

- Canadian Championship: 2013

Houston Dynamo

- Lamar Hunt U.S. Open Cup: 2018

Individual

- Dynamo Newcomer of the Year: 2016
- Dynamo Humanitarian of the Year: 2016, 2017
