= Cristian Maidana =

Argentine footballer (born 1987)

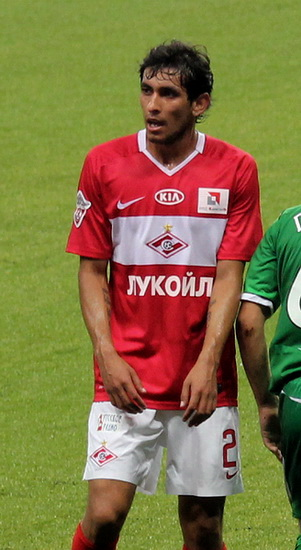
- Maidana playing for Spartak Moscow in 2010

Personal information
- Full name: Cristian Óscar Maidana
- Date of birth: January 24, 1987 (age 39)
- Place of birth: Resistencia, Chaco Province, Argentina
- Height: 1.81 m (5 ft 11 in)
- Position: Winger

Team information
- Current team: Sarmiento

Youth career
- 2004–2006: Banfield

Senior career*
Years	Team	Apps	(Gls)
2006–2007	Banfield	41	(0)
2008–2011	Spartak Moscow	34	(3)
2009	→ Recreativo (loan)	17	(1)
2011	→ Huracán (loan)	14	(1)
2011–2014	Rangers de Talca	31	(1)
2012–2013	→ Atlante (loan)	25	(3)
2013	→ Argentinos Juniors (loan)	5	(0)
2014–2015	Philadelphia Union	54	(3)
2016	Houston Dynamo	30	(3)
2017	Al Ahli	6	(0)
2017	Rionegro Águilas	12	(0)
2018	Deportivo Capiatá	37	(4)
2019	CSA	1	(0)
2019–2021	Olimpia	30	(1)
2021	Cobresal	5	(1)
2022	Boca Unidos	28	(0)
2023–2024	Los Andes	33	(5)
2024	Tembetary	12	(1)
2025	Argentino Quilmes	24	(0)
2026–	Sarmiento de Resistencia	15	(1)

International career
2006	Argentina U20	7	(1)
- * Club domestic league appearances and goals as of 22:03, 30 September 2026 (UTC)

Cristian Óscar Maidana (born January 24, 1987) is an Argentine footballer who plays as a winger for Sarmiento.

== Club career ==
=== Banfield ===
Maidana made his professional debut for Banfield in 2006, and rapidly established himself as a regular first-team player.

=== Europe ===
In December 2007, the Argentine club reached an agreement with Spartak Moscow for Maidana's transfer to the Russian side for a $3.5 million fee.

On January 16, 2009, he was loaned to Recreativo Huelva.

In the second half of the year, he returned to Spartak but was seriously injured in his very first game after the comeback (a Russian Cup match against FC Moscow).

=== Latin America ===
On December 14, 2010, Maidana was loaned to Huracán, back in Argentina.

In the middle of 2011 he signed with the club Rangers de Talca of Chile, being together with Gabriel Roth, star reinforcements for the talquino team which won promotion to the first division. In early 2012, renewed its link with Rangers for the next 2 seasons.

On July 19, 2012, the Rangers president, Richard Pini, confirmed his move to Atlante of Mexico. On July 26, 2012, Jose Antonio Garcia, CEO of Atlante confirmed his arrival at the club.

For the 2013–2014 season Maidana returned to Argentina to play for Argentinos Juniors.

=== Philadelphia Union ===
Maidana signed with Major League Soccer club Philadelphia Union on January 15, 2014. His first goal for the Union was the winning goal in a 2–1 win at Sporting Kansas City on May 14, 2014.

=== Houston Dynamo ===
On December 7, 2015, Maidana was traded to Houston Dynamo alongside teammate Andrew Wenger in exchange for allocation money and the #6 selection in the 2016 MLS SuperDraft.

== International career ==
Maidana made his debut for Argentina U20 on May 18, 2006, in the Toulon Tournament in a 1–0 loss to China. He traveled with Argentina for the 2006 World Cup as an extra player for training purposes.

== Career statistics ==
As of 11 June 2025

Appearances and goals by club, season and competition
Club	Season	League			National cup		Continental		Other		Total	
Club	Season	Division	Apps	Goals	Apps	Goals	Apps	Goals	Apps	Goals	Apps	Goals
Spartak Moscow	2008	Russian Premier League	24	3	1	0	5	0	—		30	3
Spartak Moscow	2009	Russian Premier League	0	0	1	0	—		—		1	0
Spartak Moscow	2010	Russian Premier League	10	0	1	0	1	0	—		12	0
Spartak Moscow	Total		34	3	3	0	6	0	—		43	3
Recreativo (loan)	2008–09	La Liga	17	1	—		—		—		17	1
Huracán (loan)	2010–11	Argentine Primera División	14	1	—		—		0	0	14	1
Rangers de Talca	2011	Primera B de Chile	18	0	0	0	—		—		18	0
Rangers de Talca	2012	Primera División of Chile	13	1	0	0	—		—		13	1
Rangers de Talca	Total		31	1	0	0	—		—		31	1
Atlante (loan)	2012–13	Liga MX	25	3	1	0	—		—		26	3
Argentinos Juniors (loan)	2013–14	Argentine Primera División	5	0	—		—		—		5	0
Philadelphia Union	2014	Major League Soccer	26	2	5	0	—		—		31	2
Philadelphia Union	2015	Major League Soccer	28	1	5	0	—		—		19	5
Philadelphia Union	Total		54	3	10	0	—		—		64	3
Houston Dynamo	2016	Major League Soccer	30	3	3	0	—		—		33	3
Al Ahli	2016–17	Qatar Stars League	6	0	0	0	—		—		6	0
Rionegro Águilas	2017	Categoría Primera A	12	0	—		—		—		12	0
Deportivo Capiatá	2018	Paraguayan Primera División	37	4	—		—		—		37	4
CSA	2019	Série A	1	0	—		—		0	0	1	0
Olimpia	2019–20	Liga Nacional	27	1	—		5	0	—		32	1
Olimpia	2020–21	Liga Nacional	3	0	—		0	0	—		3	0
Olimpia	Total		30	1	—		5	0	—		35	1
Cobresal	2021	Chilean Primera División	5	1	0	0	2	0	—		7	1
Boca Unidos	2022	Torneo Federal A	28	0	—		—		—		28	0
Los Andes	2023	Primera B Metropolitana	33	5	—		—		—		33	5
Tembetary	2024	Paraguayan División Intermedia	12	1	—		—		—		12	1
Argentino Quilmes	2025	Primera B Metropolitana	2	0	—		—				2	0
Career total			407	28	17	0	13	0	0	0	437	28
