= Vincent Nogueira =

French footballer (born 1988)

Personal information
- Date of birth: 16 January 1988 (age 38)
- Place of birth: Besançon, France
- Height: 1.69 m (5 ft 7 in)
- Position: Midfielder

Team information
- Current team: Strasbourg (women's manager)

Youth career
- Sochaux

Senior career*
Years	Team	Apps	(Gls)
2007–2014	Sochaux	114	(6)
2014–2016	Philadelphia Union	64	(9)
2016–2018	Strasbourg	28	(1)
2017–2018	Strasbourg B	8	(0)
2018–2019	Annecy	18	(0)
2019–2020	Schiltigheim	14	(0)
Total		246	(16)

International career
2009	France U21	1	(0)

Managerial career
- 2017–2018: Strasbourg (U17 assistant)
- 2018–2019: Annecy (U17 assistant)
- 2019–2020: Schiltigheim (U18 manager)
- 2020–: Strasbourg (women's manager)
- * Club domestic league appearances and goals

Vincent Nogueira (born 16 January 1988) is a French former professional footballer who played as a midfielder and current manager of Strasbourg's women team.

== Club career ==
=== Sochaux ===
Vincent Nogueira, who has Portuguese heritage, began his youth career at the training center of FC Sochaux. With the Sochaux youth team he won the Coupe Gambardella in 2007. Following his displays with the youth team Nogueira was promoted to the first team in 2007. He was limited by injuries for the next few seasons. He had a promising start to the 2009–10 season as he was named best Sochaux player for August 2009. He scored his first goal in Ligue 1 the last day of the 2010–11 in a 3–1 victory over AC Arles-Avignon. During the 2012–13 season Nogueira scored his first double in Ligue 1 on 26 April 2013 in a 3–3 draw with Lille, scoring on two late freekicks.

=== Philadelphia Union ===
Nogueira signed with Major League Soccer club Philadelphia Union on 30 January 2014. Noguiera would immediately become a critical insertion for the Union's starting lineup, starting 28 of his 29 appearances during the 2014 season. He would finish the season with two goals and three assists. The Union's 2015 season would see an additional five goals scored from Noguiera who continued to receive praise as a consistent performer and distributor, although he was limited during the season due to various injuries.

Midway through the 2016 season Noguiera and the Union mutually agreed to terminate his contract in June 2016 due to personal health issues. He would finish the 2016 season with the Union making 8 starts and scoring twice.

=== Strasbourg ===
Nearly a week after departing Philadelphia, Nogueira returned to his native France and signed with Ligue 2 club RC Strasbourg Alsace for their 2016–17 campaign.

After the end of the 2018–19 season Nogueira left Annecy FC.

Vincent Nogueira retired in 2020 and became a coach at his old club, RC Strasbourg Alsace

== International career ==
Nogueira made his international debut for the France U21 national team in its 2–2 tie with Poland U21 on 21 August 2009.

== Coaching career ==
After retiring in May 2020, Nogueira was immediately appointed manager of Strasbourg's women team. As of September 2022, he was still at the same position.

== Personal life ==
In February 2016, Nogueira received his U.S. green card which qualifies him as a domestic player for MLS roster purposes.

== Honours ==
Strasbourg

- Ligue 2: 2017
