= Maurice Edu =

American soccer player and television sportscaster (born 1986)

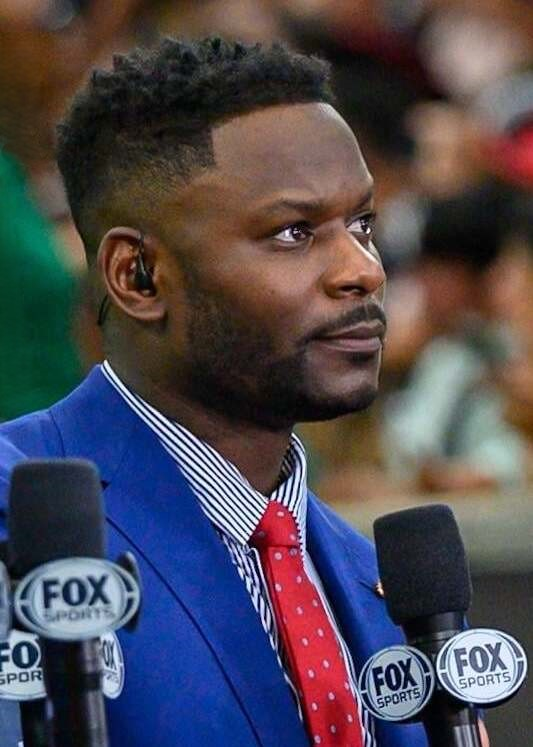
- Edu in 2025

Personal information
- Full name: Maurice Edu
- Date of birth: April 18, 1986 (age 40)
- Place of birth: Fontana, California, United States
- Height: 6 ft 0 in (1.83 m)
- Positions: Midfielder; defender

College career
Years	Team	Apps	(Gls)
2004–2006	Maryland Terrapins	55	(10)

Senior career*
Years	Team	Apps	(Gls)
2007–2008	Toronto FC	38	(5)
2008–2012	Rangers	96	(9)
2012–2015	Stoke City	1	(0)
2013	→ Bursaspor (loan)	11	(0)
2014	→ Philadelphia Union (loan)	31	(3)
2015–2017	Philadelphia Union	22	(1)
2016–2017	→ Bethlehem Steel (loan)	6	(0)
Total		205	(18)

International career
2007–2008	United States U23	6	(0)
2007–2014	United States	46	(1)
Medal record
Representing United States
Runner-up	CONCACAF Gold Cup	2011
Men's Soccer
- * Club domestic league appearances and goals

Maurice Edu (born April 18, 1986) is an American soccer commentator and former professional player.

Edu was the first overall pick in the 2007 MLS SuperDraft and won the MLS Rookie of the Year Award with Toronto. His performances for Toronto earned him international call ups to the United States national team and the attention of clubs in Europe.

He signed with Rangers, winning the Scottish Premier League three times. Following Rangers' financial problems, he joined Stoke City; however, failing to make an impact, he spent time on loan with Turkey's Bursaspor before returning to MLS with Philadelphia Union.

He currently commentates for MLS Season Pass on Apple TV, as well as Fox Sports' coverage of the 2022 FIFA World Cup. He also has worked on Atlanta United's local TV broadcasts.

== Early life ==
Edu was born and raised in Fontana, California. Edu played college soccer at the University of Maryland, College Park from 2004 until 2006 and played three years for the Maryland Terrapins, including a role on the 2005 squad that won the NCAA College Cup national championship. He forfeited his final year of NCAA eligibility to enter the 2007 MLS SuperDraft as a Generation Adidas player. He was named a first-team All-American in 2006.

== Club career ==
=== Toronto ===
Edu cut short his time at college to join Major League Soccer and was drafted by Toronto as the first overall pick of the 2007 MLS SuperDraft. He made his MLS debut on April 25, 2007, against Kansas City Wizards, and he scored his first professional goal in the seventy-fifth minute of a game against Chicago Fire on May 12. During that first season he made twenty-five appearances in MLS and scored four goals. He ended his debut season by winning the MLS Rookie of the Year award and earning his first senior national team cap.

=== Rangers ===
On August 16, 2008, Edu flew to Glasgow to hold talks with Scottish Premier League team Rangers after a fee of £2.6 million, was agreed with MLS. Edu signed a five-year contract with Rangers on August 17, 2008, but had to wait until five days later to officially join after successfully gaining a work permit.

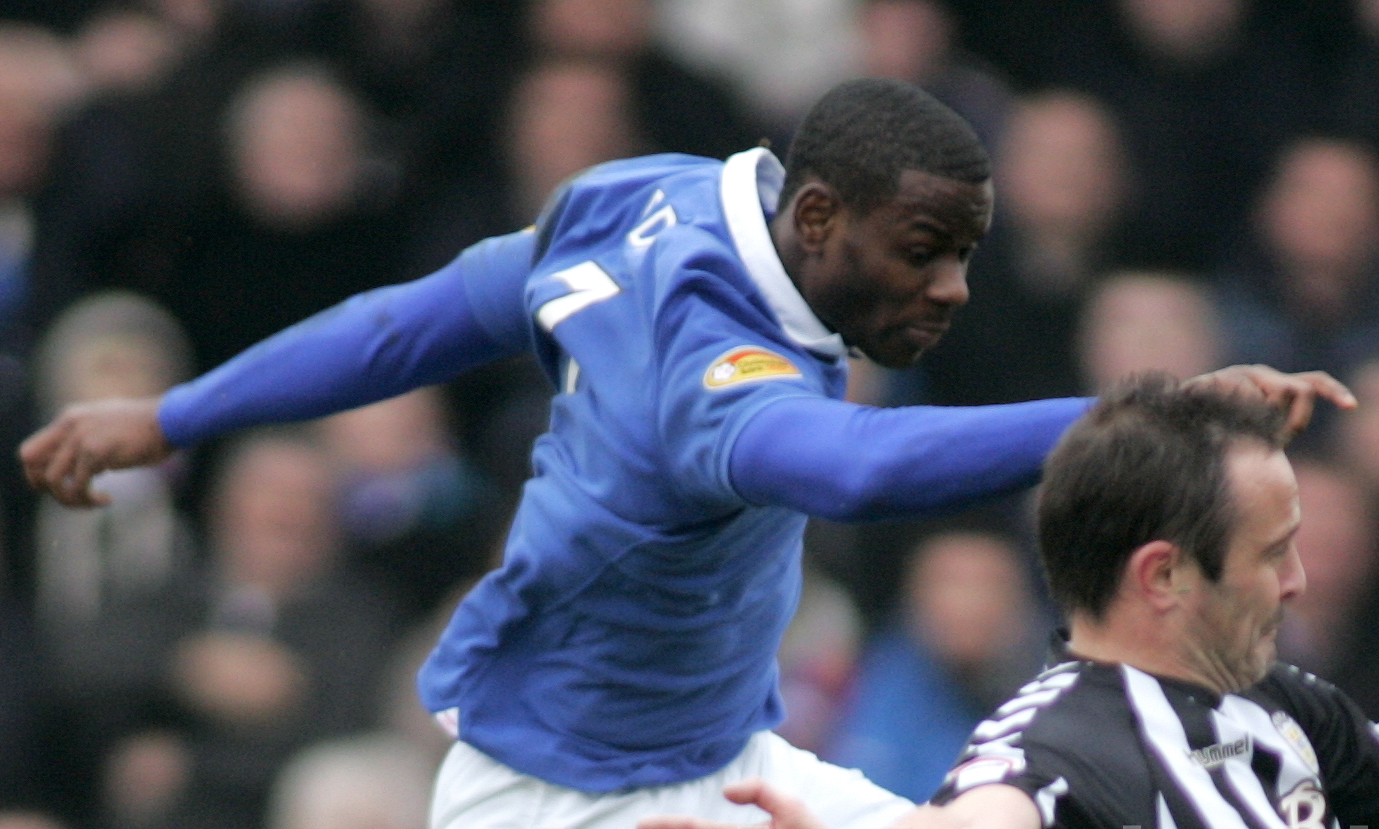
Edu playing for Rangers against St Mirren in March 2011

Edu made his debut for Rangers in a league match against Kilmarnock on September 13, 2008. The team won 2–1 thanks to a Kris Boyd double. Edu scored his first goal for Rangers on April 8, 2009, in a league match against St Mirren and then followed his goal up with another against Hibernian in a 3–2 win at Easter Road eleven days later. He went on a run of games towards the end of the season including his Old Firm debut against Celtic on May 9 at Ibrox in a 1–0 Rangers win. He ended his first season in Scottish soccer by winning a league championship medal – having played in twelve of Rangers' thirty-eight games in the 2008–09 SPL season. However, a torn cruciate knee ligament saw him miss out on the Scottish Cup final.

After recovering from his injury, Edu returned for Rangers as a 74th-minute substitute in a 4–1 win against Hibernian on December 27, 2009, but only played four games before being sidelined for another month with an ankle problem. He had complained of racist abuse from two Rangers supporters after the club's 4–1 home defeat to FC Unirea Urziceni in October 2009. Rangers came to the defense for Edu, condemning the Rangers supporters as 'moronic' and 'disgusting'.

A turnaround in his fortunes began when he came off the bench to score a 93rd minute stoppage-time winner against Old Firm rivals Celtic on February 28, 2010, as Rangers won 1–0. On March 21, 2010, Edu came on as a half-time substitute when Rangers beat St Mirren to win the League Cup Final. His domestic season ended with him being awarded a second league medal having appeared in fifteen of the thirty-eight games. During the 2010–11 season, Edu made his Champions League debut against English giants Manchester United at Old Trafford and drew plaudits for his performance.

On October 20, 2010, he scored his first Champions League goal against Spanish side Valencia, converting from a Vladimír Weiss corner, but scored an own goal to equalize for Valencia minutes after the restart in a game that finished 1–1. After the match, Edu told Sky Sports that he has a mixed emotion and said

The first goal I didn't have time to celebrate because I took a knock on the head and was laid on the ground for a while. The own goal, I saw it late and the next thing I know it hit me and it was in. I was trying to mark the guy in front of me and it looked like he was going to get it and at the last minute it hit me. That was obviously disappointing but we kept going and created more chances.

Edu made his 100th appearance in all competitions for Rangers on November 5, 2011, in their 3–1 win over Dundee United. During the season, Rangers where placed into administration over financial problems and a dispute with HMRC, leading a 10-point deduction. As months passed, manager Ally McCoist announced Edu and Alejandro Bedoya would possibly both leave the club Edu was linked with a move to Ipswich Town but both claims was denied from the club and himself, claiming he was unaware with a move to Ipswich.

=== Stoke City ===
Edu joined Premier League side Stoke City on August 25, 2012, signing a three-year contract. Following the move Edu revealed it was a 'dream come true' to sign for a Premier League side. He had to wait until October 7 before he made his debut for Stoke coming on as an 80th-minute substitute in a 0–0 draw at Liverpool. That 10-minute cameo proved to be Edu's only appearance for Stoke in 2012–13 under Tony Pulis. He had hopes for a fresh start under new manager Mark Hughes, but Edu did not make any appearances or even appear on the bench for Stoke under the new manager.

=== Bursaspor (loan) ===
After failing to break into the first team at the Britannia Stadium, Edu joined Turkish Süper Lig side Bursaspor on loan until the end of the 2012–13 season. He played 12 times for Bursaspor as they finished in 4th position.

=== Philadelphia Union ===
On January 27, 2014, Edu joined Philadelphia Union on loan for the 2014 Major League Soccer season with an option to buy. On April 5, Edu scored his first goal for the Union in a 2–2 draw against Chicago Fire. During the 2014 U.S. Open Cup Final, Edu scored a critical goal that put the Union in the lead 1–0, but they ultimately lost in extra time.

Edu made his move to Philadelphia permanent in January 2015. Despite his position as a holding midfielder, Edu was often deployed as a centerback during most of the 2014 and 2015 seasons; benefiting from his long range passing and technical ability on the ball. In late September 2015, Edu suffered a groin muscle injury that kept him out for the remainder of the 2015 season.

Upon recovery from the groin injury, Edu further suffered a stress fracture in his left leg, leaving him sidelined for the entirety of the 2016 season. While he did not make any first-team appearances in 2016 due to injury recovery, he made three appearances for the Union's USL affiliate, Bethlehem Steel FC. Similarly for the 2017 season, Edu would only make spot appearances for Steel FC and see no first team minutes during his injury recovery.

Edu was released from the Union at the conclusion of his contract after the 2017 season. He trained on trial in the off-season with Los Angeles FC, but no contract was agreed to.

== International career ==
Edu made his international debut for the United States against Switzerland on October 17, 2007, and won his second cap a month later against South Africa, where he registered an assist on Steve Cherundolo's winning goal. Edu was included in the U.S. team for the 2008 Summer Olympics. He played in all three of the group matches and deputized as a center back. Edu drew a penalty in the final game of the group stage against Nigeria which Sacha Kljestan took and finished. However, the U.S. were knocked out of the group stage after that loss. Edu scored his first international goal for the U.S. during a friendly against Czech Republic on May 25, 2010.

Edu made only one brief appearance for the national team in 2009, as a stoppage-time substitute in a World Cup qualifier against El Salvador. That was his solitary game in the final stage of qualifying for South Africa. Despite this, he was selected as a member of the 23-man roster for the 2010 FIFA World Cup in South Africa. On June 18, against Slovenia, he volleyed in a free kick from Landon Donovan in the 85th minute with the game tied at 2–2, but referee Koman Coulibaly disallowed the goal. Coulibaly's decision was heavily criticized by commentators and columnists who believed the United States committed no fouls on the play and were the ones being fouled for the most part.

Edu continued to make appearances under Jürgen Klinsmann during 2011 and 2012. His appearances with the national team then diminished.

== Career statistics ==
=== Club ===
As of February 16, 2018

Club	Season	League			National cup (Note: Includes Canadian Championship, Scottish Cup, Turkish Cup, U.S. Open Cup)		League cup (Note: Includes Scottish League Cup)		Continental		Total	
Club	Season	Division	Apps	Goals	Apps	Goals	Apps	Goals	Apps	Goals	Apps	Goals
Toronto	2007	Major League Soccer	25	4	–		–		–		25	4
Toronto	2008	Major League Soccer	13	1	3	1	–		–		16	2
Toronto	Total		38	5	3	1	–		–		41	6
Rangers	2008–09	Scottish Premier League	12	2	3	0	1	0	0	0	16	2
Rangers	2009–10	Scottish Premier League	15	2	4	0	1	0	0	0	20	2
Rangers	2010–11	Scottish Premier League	33	2	3	0	3	1	8 (Note: Four appearances and one goal in UEFA Champions League, four appearances and one goal in UEFA Europa League)	2	47	5
Rangers	2011–12	Scottish Premier League	36	3	2	0	0	0	4 (Note: Two appearances in UEFA Champions League, two appearances in UEFA Europa League)	0	42	3
Rangers	Total		96	9	12	0	5	1	12	2	125	12
Stoke City	2012–13	Premier League	1	0	0	0	0	0	–		1	0
Stoke City	2013–14	Premier League	0	0	0	0	0	0	–		0	0
Stoke City	Total		1	0	0	0	0	0	–		1	0
Bursaspor (loan)	2012–13	Süper Lig	11	0	2	0	–		–		13	0
Philadelphia Union (loan)	2014	Major League Soccer	31	3	5	2	–		–		36	5
Philadelphia Union	2015	Major League Soccer	22	1	5	0	–		–		27	1
Philadelphia Union	2016	Major League Soccer	0	0	0	0	–		–		0	0
Philadelphia Union	2017	Major League Soccer	0	0	0	0	–		–		0	0
Philadelphia Union	Total		53	4	10	2	–		–		63	6
Bethlehem Steel	2016	United Soccer League	3	0	–		–		–		3	0
Bethlehem Steel	2017	United Soccer League	3	0	–		–		–		3	0
Bethlehem Steel	Total		6	0	–		–		–		6	0
Career Total			205	20	27	3	5	1	12	2	249	26

== Personal life ==
Edu is the son of Nigerian immigrant parents. His father, Maurice Sr., was a mathematics teacher, and his mother is a chemistry teacher. He has a younger brother Reggie Edu, who is a teacher, coach and director of coaching for the southern Californian youth soccer club Newcastle United FC out of Upland, California, and three older sisters.

Edu featured alongside Guillermo Ochoa and Ronaldinho as one of the FIFA 09 cover stars in North America.

== Honors ==
Rangers

- Scottish Premier League: 2008–09, 2009–10, 2010–11
- Scottish Cup 2008–09
- Scottish League Cup: 2009–10, 2010–11

Individual

- MLS Rookie of the Year: 2007
