= Industrial Designers Society of America =

Non-profit organization

- Abbreviation: IDSA
- Predecessor: American Design Institute (ADI); Industrial Designers Institute (IDI); American Society of Industrial Designers (ASID); Industrial Designers Education Association (IDEA)
- Formation: 1965; 61 years ago
- Type: Professional association
- Website: idsa.org

The Industrial Designers Society of America (IDSA) is a membership-based not-for-profit organization that promotes the practice and education of industrial design.

The organization was formally established in 1965 by the collaborative merger of the Industrial Designers Institute (IDI), the American Society of Industrial Designers (ASID), and the Industrial Designers Education Association (IDEA). However, its origins can be traced back to the 1920s, prior to the founding in 1938 of the American Design Institute (ADI), which was the predecessor of IDI. Its first chairman was John Vassos and its first president was Henry Dreyfuss.

The society publishes a quarterly journal, Innovation, in which Klaus Krippendorff coined the term "product semantics" in his 1984 article "Exploring the Symbolic Qualities of Form", as well as books such as Design Secrets: Products: 50 Real-Life Projects Uncovered.

In 1980, the society established the International Design Excellence Awards (IDEA).

== Chapters ==
Since IDSAs formation with just 10 chapters, it has grown to now having chapters in 25 US states and 1 in Canada. The current 35 professional chapters support over 70 student chapters across North America.

Chapters and Membership Structure

The Industrial Designers Society of America (IDSA) organizes its membership through a decentralized network of Professional and Student Chapters. This structure is designed to facilitate local networking, professional development, and community engagement within the industrial design field.

Professional Chapters

Professional chapters are geographically based and serve as regional hubs for practitioners, educators, and design leaders. These chapters host local events, such as studio tours, lectures, and social mixers, to foster connection among designers in specific metropolitan areas or regions. They play a critical role in the society’s governance by providing a local voice in national initiatives.

Student Chapters

IDSA maintains more than 70 student chapters at colleges and universities throughout North America. Each chapter is led by student officers and supported by a faculty advisor. These chapters provide students with resources for career preparation, including portfolio reviews and access to the annual Student Merit Awards program, which recognizes outstanding graduating seniors in industrial design programs.

Regional Districts

To coordinate activities between the national office and local chapters, IDSA groups its chapters into five geographic districts:

Central, Midwest, Northeast, South, & West

These districts hosted annual conferences that serve as mid-sized gatherings for both students and professionals within those specific regions. These regional conferences were discontinued following an announcement in November 2018.

== Members ==
Notable members of the Industrial Designers Society of America (IDSA) include the original members who established the profession as well as contemporary leaders who shape industrial design.

The society grants the title of Fellow (FIDSA) to members in good standing who have made "notable and substantial contributions" to the profession.

Some Notable Members

Founding members and pioneers

Henry Dreyfuss (1904–1972): The first president of IDSA. He famously applied anthropometry to design and created the iconic Western Electric 500 telephone and the Honeywell round thermostat.

John Vassos (1898–1985): The first chairman of IDSA. He was a longtime designer for RCA and designed the first commercially available television sets.

Walter Dorwin Teague (1883–1960): A founder of the predecessor Society of Industrial Designers (SID), known for his work with Kodak and Texaco.

Raymond Loewy (1893–1986): Widely considered the "father of industrial design," he designed the Shell and Exxon logos, the Studebaker Avanti, and the Air Force One livery.

Notable contemporary members

Yves Béhar, FIDSA: Founder of the design firm fuseproject. He is known for the One Laptop per Child (OLPC) project and his work on sustainable product design.

Patricia Moore, FIDSA: A pioneer of universal design and gerontology. She is famous for her three-year social experiment in the late 1970s where she disguised herself as an 80-year-old woman to understand the challenges of the elderly.

D'Wayne Edwards: Founder of Pensole Academy and a leading footwear designer who has designed over 500 styles for athletes including Michael Jordan and Carmelo Anthony.

Tucker Viemeister, FIDSA: Co-founder of Smart Design and designer of the original OXO Good Grips kitchen tools, which became a hallmark of universal design.

Lorraine Justice, FIDSA: A prominent educator and author who served as the Dean of the College of Design at Georgia Tech and the Hong Kong Polytechnic University.

David Hill, an IDSA International Design Excellence Award and Design of the Decade winner, led ThinkPad industrial design for nearly two decades. Hill currently serves on the Professional Advisory Board for the University of Kansas School of Architecture and Design and is also a Distinguished Alumnus.

== History ==
Predecessor organizations (1938–1965)

The roots of IDSA can be traced to the emergence of industrial design as a recognized profession in the United States during the late 1920s. Prior to the 1965 merger that created the IDSA of today, several competing organizations represented the field:

American Designers Institute (ADI): Founded in 1938 in Chicago as the Designers' Institute of the American Furniture Mart, it was renamed the American Designers Institute the following year to reflect a broader scope of design areas including crafts and packaging. In 1951, it moved its headquarters to New York City and became the Industrial Designers Institute (IDI).

Society of Industrial Designers (SID): Established in 1944 by 15 prominent East Coast practitioners including Walter Dorwin Teague, Henry Dreyfuss, and Raymond Loewy. The SID was an elite group with strict membership requirements. In 1955, the group changed its name to the American Society of Industrial Design (ASID).

Industrial Design Education Association (IDEA): Formed in 1957 to represent design educators as the existing professional bodies at the time generally did not admit academics. While it matches the acronym of the current awards, they are not officially related.

Formation and merger (1965)

After more than a decade of work to unify the profession, IDI, ASID, and IDEA merged in 1965 to form the Industrial Designers Society of America (IDSA). At the time of its founding, the society consisted of approximately 600 members in 10 chapters. Its first chairman was John Vassos, and its first president was Henry Dreyfuss. The first national meeting took place in Oak Brook, Illinois, from September 30 to October 2, 1965.

Expansion and awards (1980–present)

In 1980, the society established the International Design Excellence Awards (IDEA) to recognize achievements in product design, branding, and design strategy. The awards have become one of the most prestigious competitions in the design industry, with winning entries housed in the permanent collection of The Henry Ford museum.

Established in January 1982, INNOVATION is the official peer-reviewed quarterly journal of the Industrial Designers Society of America (IDSA), serving as a primary record for the evolution of industrial design theory and practice. The publication provides in-depth analysis of emerging trends, design methodology, and the social impact of the profession, and it is widely recognized for featuring the winners of the annual International Design Excellence Awards (IDEA). One of the journal's most distinct physical characteristics is "the hole" drilled through the upper left corner, a design feature introduced in 1995 to represent the "dot" in the IDSA logo which allowed the issues to be easily hung or archived by practitioners.

Legal Entity Change (2001)

In 2001, IDSA founded the Design Foundation, a 501(c)(3) charitable organization to support industrial design scholarships and educational outreach. The society's archives, documenting the early history of the profession, are maintained at the Syracuse University Libraries and the Hagley Museum and Library.

== Programs, Awards, & Events ==
The Industrial Designers Society of America (IDSA) hosts several annual programs designed to recognize professional excellence and facilitate the exchange of ideas within the global industrial design community.

International Design Conference (IDC)

The society’s flagship event is the International Design Conference (IDC), which serves as the organization's only national conference and meeting. The conference features keynote speakers, workshops, and networking sessions for practitioners and educators. It is frequently held in conjunction with the Education Symposium, a peer-reviewed platform where design academics present research and discuss educational trends in industrial design.

International Design Excellence Awards (IDEA)

Established in 1980, IDEA is a globally recognized competition that honors achievements in product design, branding, and design strategy. Entries are judged by an international jury based on innovation, user benefit, and social responsibility. Since 2010, the winners and finalists of the competition have been housed in the permanent collection of The Henry Ford museum.

Student Merit Awards (SMA)

The SMA program is an annual competition that recognizes the top graduating seniors from IDSA-affiliated industrial design programs. The competition occurs in three stages: institutional selection, followed by a presentation at the district level, and culminating in the naming of five District winners (Central, Midwest, Northeast, South, and West).

The Personal Recognition Award

Presented to individuals who have performed a specific, notable act or service that has furthered the profession.

The Education Award

Recognizes significant contributions to industrial design education and academia.

Academy of Fellows (FIDSA)

Membership in the Academy of Fellows is the highest honor bestowed by the society, granted to members in good standing who have achieved high distinction in the profession and the society.

== See also ==
- Designer
- Product development
- UI/UX design
- Product design
- International Design Excellence Awards
