= Metropolis (architecture magazine) =

American architecture and design magazine

- Metropolis Magazine December 2011 cover
- Editor in Chief: Avinash Rajagopal
- Categories: Architecture and Design
- Frequency: 10 issues per year
- Publisher: Eugenie Cowan Havemeyer
- Total circulation: 50,000 (2017)
- Founder: Horace Havemeyer III
- Founded: 1981
- Company: Sandow Media
- Country: USA
- Based in: New York City, New York, U.S.
- Language: English
- Website: metropolismag.com
- ISSN: 0279-4977

Metropolis is an internationally recognized design and architecture–concentrated magazine with a strong focus on ethics, innovation and sustainability in the creative sector. The magazine was established in 1981 by Horace Havemeyer III of Bellerophon Publications, Inc alongside his wife Eugenie Cowan Havemeyer and is based in New York City. Metropolis's work towards future focused is based in their motto "design at all scales".

The magazine is published ten times a year with over 50,000 subscribers. Metropolis publishes both print and digital editorial coverage encouraging design focused conversation through a range of diverse mediums. Alongside the magazine itself, Metropolis produces four additional print supplements and a series of live across the United States. Metropolis produces digital media for their website and social accounts. Their website receives approximately 85,000 unique visitors every month while its socials amass an audience of over 100,000 followers across Instagram and Facebook combined. In 2019 Metropolis was acquired by Sandow Media for an undisclosed amount. Metropolis annually hosts a range of virtual and in-person events alongside design competition schemes encouraging innovation and sustainability.

== History ==
Metropolis was launched in 1981 by Horace Havemeyer III (1942–2014) and Eugenie Cowan Havemeyer. Havemeyer III was born in Dix Hills moving to New York City in 1969 where he worked at Doubleday publishers as a production planning supervisor for a decade. He went on to completed courses at the Institute for Architecture and Urban Studies prompting his work at the IAUS journal, Skyline until it closed. In 1981, he founded Bellerophon Publications alongside his wife, serving as publishing body and founders of Metropolis magazine. As evidenced in early editions, the magazine began with a particular focus on architecture in New York City and quickly expanded to embrace a range of design disciplines internationally.

In 1985 Suzan S. Szenasy took over as the editor-in-chief of Metropolis. As a contemporary figurehead in design and innovation and notable "voice of the design world" Szenasy led Metropolis to international acclaim. Szenasy's influence addressed sustainability and inclusive design on the stage of a mainstream publication before familiarity of such practices was attracted.

Metropolis' values largely surrounded Szenasy's writings, which emphasize the importance of ethics and sustainable intervention in the education and practices of designers.

In 2017, Avinash Rajagopal took over from Szenasy as the editor-in-chief of Metropolis as Szenasy moved into a new role as Director of Design Innovation. Rajagopal's role as editor-in-chief followed his success as Metropolis' senior editor from 2011 to 2016. In 2019 Rajagopal worked alongside Eugenie Havemeyer in Sandow Media's acquisition of the magazine to their portfolio.

== Editors-In-Chief ==
- Horace Havemeyer III, 1981–1986
- Susan S. Szenasy, 1986–2017
- Avinash Rajagopal, 2017–present; assumed this role after working as senior editor at the magazine from 2011 to 2016.

== Influence ==
Metropolis is centered around futurism in its focus on the innovative needs of consumers and the planet. The magazine investigates the role designers can play in reversing the climate crisis by rejecting developments founded on self-interest and monetary gain. With a strong focus on futurist ideals and sustainability Metropolis encourages affirmative action in developing a progressive and environmentally enduring world.

=== Futurism and Sustainability ===
Metropolis is heavily inspired aesthetically and culturally by futurist values. It focuses significantly on the technological progress of the modern machine age, eagerly anticipating vitality and progression of design and architectural realms. The magazine embraces an artistic futurist aesthetic, frequently applying neo-impressionism and cubism in its covers as a direct reflection of the dynamism of modernity the magazine embodies.

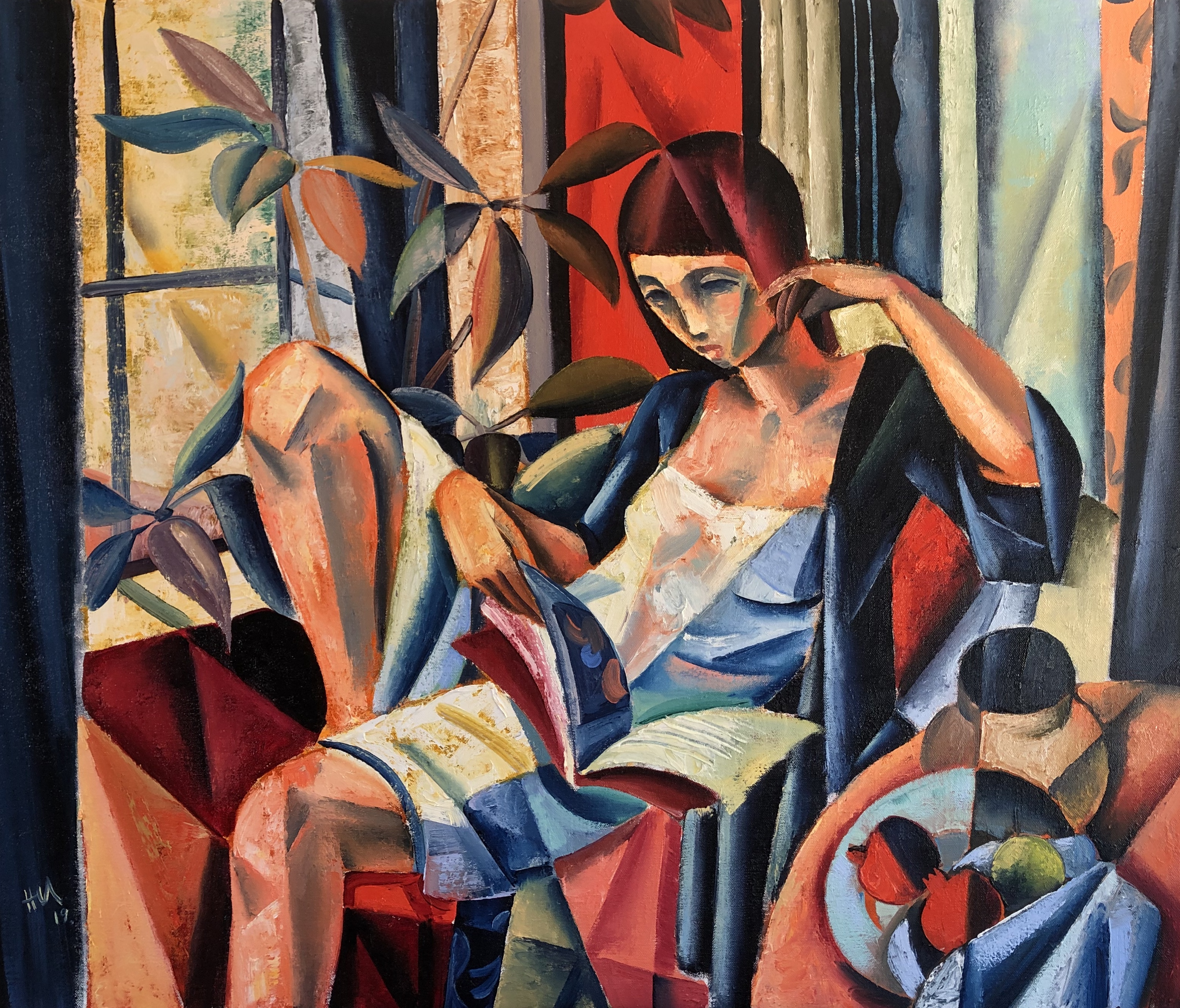
Hennie Niemann's oil on Belgian linen work entitled, 'The Visitor' demonstrates use of cubism that is commonly illustrated in the aesthetic design of Metropolis magazine.

The magazine remains heavily influenced by the work and writings of former editor, Susan S. Szenasy, due to the accuracy at which she was able to anticipate changing realities within design from the 80's to the present moment.

As part of Metropolis's 40th anniversary the magazine republished old pieces that anticipated trends in design that remain pertinent today with a particular focus on "work, sustainability, the wellness movement, the concept of reuse, gender issues, accessibility and the new digital technologies." The articles republished were included online and within print supplements entitled "40 Years of Looking Forward". Editor-in-chief Avinash Rajagopal wrote in the July/August 2021 issue of Metropolis:

"In looking through our archive, I'm struck by how many articles resonate with today's challenges. On remote work policies or gender inequity, carbon accounting or product manufacturing, Metropolis raised questions that we're still trying to answer today".

The republished work included:

- March 1989—This issue featured an article by Susan S. Szenasy entitled "Making Home Work" with exact parallels to the COVID-19 work from home movement.
- May 1989—Featured an article entitled "Building with the Sun" by Don Prowler focalising the emergence of the sustainability movement.
- October 1996 – Included the article, "Well-Being", by Barry M. Katz introduced this concept to designers.
- May 1999 – "The Mall Doctor", by Ellen Barr campaigned for reuse over reconstruction in architecture.

Metropolis's embodiment of futurism and sustainability thereby encourages a "coexistence with future generations for the premonition, and anticipatory belief in future formulas".

== Notable Volumes ==
The following table highlights volumes of Metropolis considered notable within the design community. The listed issues are significant due to contentious and innovative design thinking.

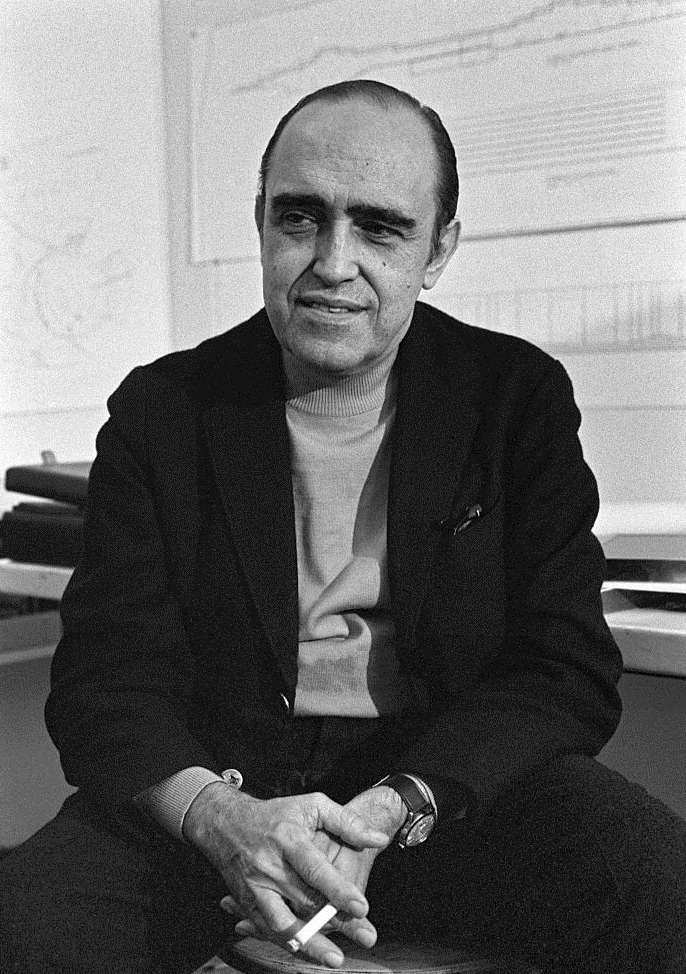
Oscar Niemeyer, Brazilian architect core to the development of Modern Architecture. Interviewed in the January 2001 issue of Metropolis within the article "9 over 90".

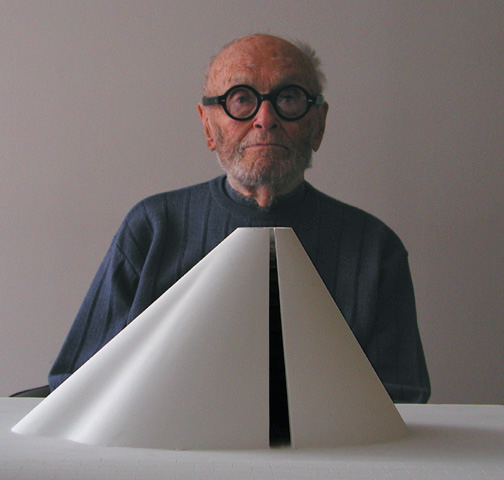
Philip Johnson, American architect involved in modern and post-modern architectural development. Interviewed in the January 2001 issue of Metropolis within the article "9 over 90".

January 2001	The September 2001 issue of Metropolis was a special edition volume entitled "9 Over 90”, interviewing a group of successful designers from a range of disciplines still working passionately in their 90's. The designers interviewed included, Oscar Niemeyer, Philip Johnson, Pauline Trigere, Morris Lapidus, Al Hirschfeld, Nathan Juran, Sarah Tomerlin Lee, Viktor Schreckengost, Julius Shulman and Eva Zeisel. The issue explores the stimulating paradox between age and success in the architecture realm.
October 2003	The October 2003 issue of Metropolis is thought to be contentious, boldly confronting architects' disinterest in sustainability a cover reading "Architects Pollute". Editor-and-Chief Susan S. Szenasy was greeted with hostility by the architectural community for such a statement leading to the establishment of Metropolis' "Lowering the Global Thermostat" symposia alongside architect Ed Mazria. Audiences responded with optimism to this addressing the need to establish solutions towards a sustainable future. Mazria developed the 2030 challenge, closing his architectural practice to establish 'Architecture 2030’, a non-profit organization that pledges and encouraged reductions to carbon footprints within the building sector. The American Institute of Architects embraced this challenge alongside individual firms over the following decade.
June, September and November 2007	The June, September and November issues of Metropolis Magazine were nominated as finalists in the National Magazine Awards in the Under 100,000 Circulation' category for General Excellence.
May, June and November 2008	The May, June and November issues of Metropolis Magazine were nominated as finalists in the National Magazine Awards in the Under 100,000 Circulation' category for General Excellence.
March 2009 issue	The March 2009 issue of Metropolis, entitled "What is Good Design now?" is praised for its ability to initiate a broad, timely debate on product design six months after the beginning of the 2008 financial crisis. Joe Hockenberry's article "Within the Product of No Product", provides commentary on the decline of consumerism resulting from the 2008 financial crisis. He notably suggests "the strongest product brand was No Product and the strongest consumer impulse was not buying". This edition of Metropolis focused on the implications for industrial designers after the 2008 financial crisis and how green product design may be applied in spite of this.

== ‌Competition ==
Metropolis hosts a range of creative competitions annually to encourage innovation and forward thinking among contemporary design practitioners. The magazines most notable award schemes are the annual 'Next Generation Design Competition', 'Planet Positive Awards' and the 'Future 100’.

=== Next Generation Design ===
Metropolis annually hosts the 'Next Generation Design Competition' alongside Staples Business Advantage. The competition encourages experienced designers to create based around five major themes: collaboration, wellness, effectiveness and productivity, office culture, and sustainability. The competition awards victors with $10,000 in venture capital to encourage production, with the only eligibility criteria being entrants must have been practicing for a decade or less are eligible.

=== Planet Positive Awards ===
The 'Planet Positive Awards' recognize sustainable creative projects and products internationally that benefit both people and the planet. The competition inaugurally occurred in 2021. Project eligibility included sustainable architecture and interior design projects developed over the past three years dating from June 2018-June 2021, and sustainable products released between June 2019-June 2021. As a prerequisite to entrance all competition entries must recognize they are targeting sustainability through official sustainability certifications. The 'Planet Positive Award' winners were published in the November/December 2021 issue of the magazine, Volume 41, No 6 and recognized formally in a virtual awards ceremony facilitated by Sandow through their Design TV platform.

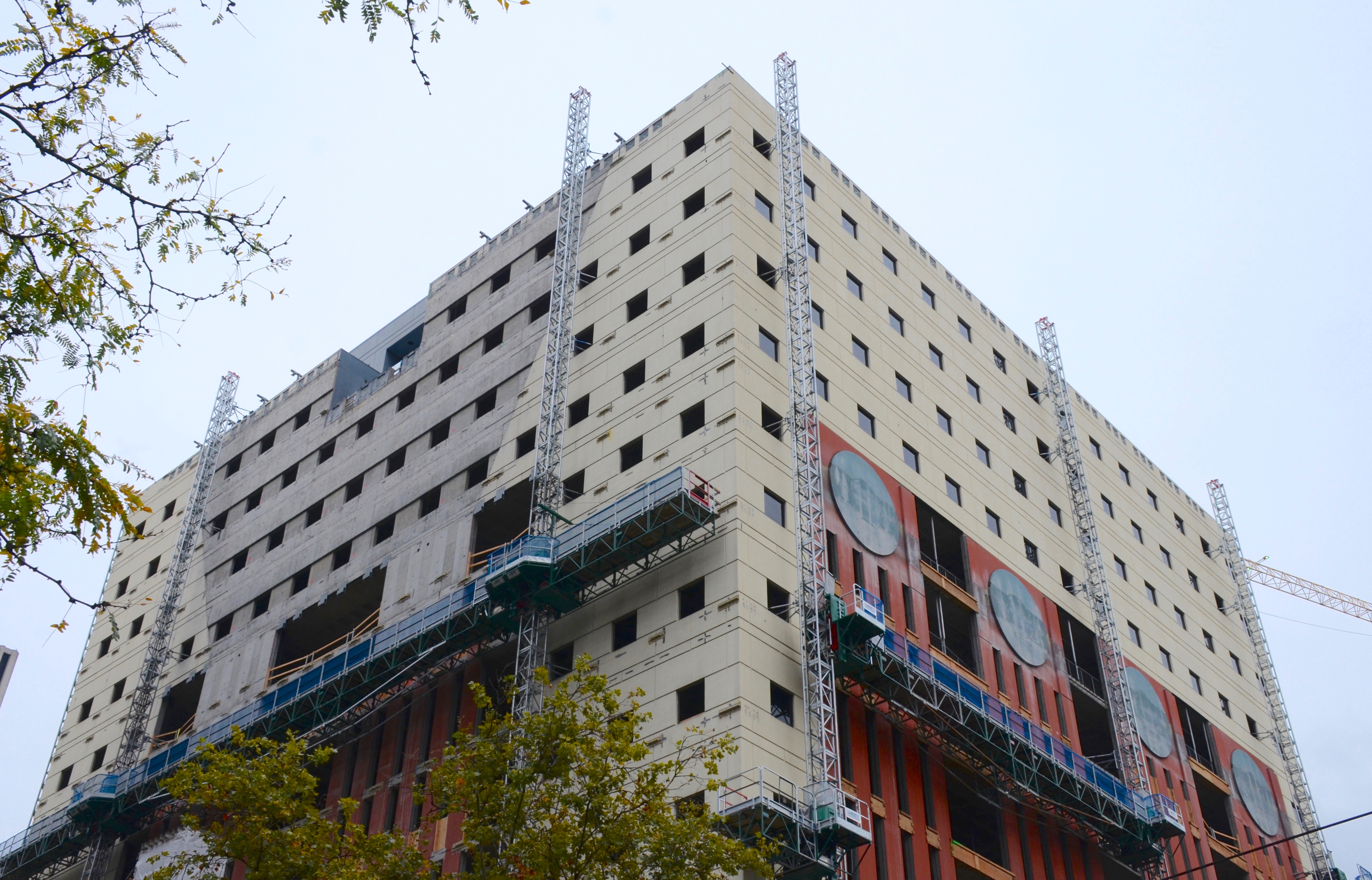
The Portland Building Reconstruction designed by the DLR Group. Received 2021 Planet Positive Award under the category Civic/Cultural.

==== Award recipients ====
The awards were grouped into seven categories for judgement including: civic/cultural, workplace, healthcare, multifamily, hospitality, education, and products.

Civic/Cultural	The Portland Building Reconstruction designed by the DLR Group.
Workplace	663 South Cooper designed by Archimania.
Healthcare	Orthodontics Only designed by IA Interior Architects and Rainier Beach Clinic designed by Mahlum Architects.
Multifamily	Monarch Village designed by Studio 804.
Hospitality	McDonald's Chicago designed by Ross Barney Architects.
Education	The Keneda Building for Innovative Sustainable Design designed by Miller Hull Partnership & Lord Aeck Sargent Planning and Design, Inc.
Product	Net Positive Products designed by Humanscale.

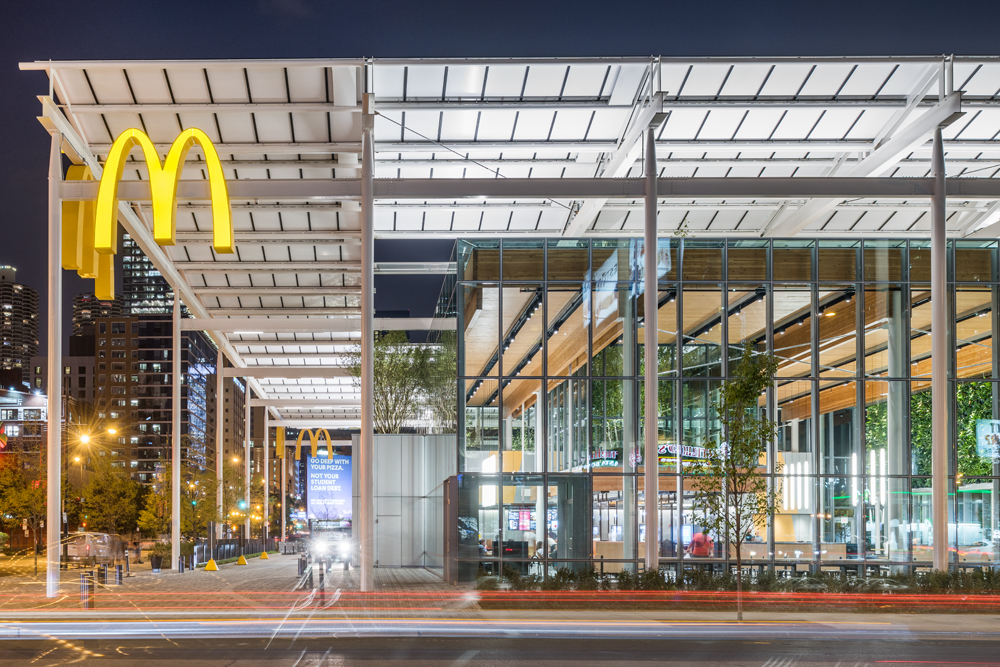
McDonald's Chicago designed by Ross Barney Architects. Received 2021 Planet Positive Award under the category Hospitality.

=== Future 100 ===
Metropolis' 'Future 100' awards act as the connector of top tier architectural talent with leading design firms. The award recognizes the top 100 graduating students from interior and architecture design programs in the United States and Canada. Award recipients will be featured in Metropolis on both print and digital scales, alongside recognition of their programs, nominators, and school.

The inaugural 'Future 100' interior design and architecture graduating students were named in 2021 and can be found on the Metropolis website.

== Awards ==
In 2007 and 2008 Metropolis was a finalist in the National Magazine Awards in the 'Under 100,000 Circulation' category for General Excellence. This award honours effectiveness and overall excellence in which "writing, reporting, editing, and design all come together to command readers attention and fulfill the magazines unique editorial decision".

In 2007 Havemeyer III, Szenasy and Metropolis won the CIVITAS August Heckscher Award "for their twenty-five years pursuing enlightened and intelligent documentation of life in urban America, especially New York City".

In 2009 Havemeyer III was awarded the Institute Honor for Collaborative Achievement by the American Institute of Architects on behalf of Metropolis magazine.

In 2017, Susan S. Szenasy (Metropolis's editor-in-chief from 1986 to 2017) received the Cooper–Hewitt, Smithsonian Design Museum's Director's Award in recognition of her work at Metropolis and beyond.
