= SADP =

SADP may refer to:

== Science and technology ==
- Self-aligned double-patterning, a multiple patterning technique in semiconductor manufacturing
- Selected area diffraction pattern, in crystallography

== Other uses ==
- El Palomar Airport, Argentina (ICAO code: SADP)
- The School of Architecture, Design, and Planning (SADP), former name of the University of Kansas School of Architecture, Design, and Planning
