= University of Kansas School of Architecture and Design =

Architecture school of the University of Kansas

Coordinates: 38.958471°N 95.250104°W

University of Kansas School of Architecture & Design
- Type: Public Professional School
- Established: 1912, 1969
- Dean: Mahbub Rashid
- Location: Lawrence, Kansas, U.S.
- Colors: Crimson and blue
- Website: arcd.ku.edu

The School of Architecture & Design (ArcD) is a professional school of the University of Kansas (KU) with programs in architecture and design.

== History ==
The School traces its architectural roots to 1912 when KU's School of Engineering faculty established an undergraduate degree program in architectural engineering (ARCE). Existing faculty taught the initial architectural engineering courses, but Goldwin Goldsmith, a principal of the New York City architectural firm Van Vleck and Goldsmith, was hired as the first full-time faculty member and chair of architectural engineering.

Eight years later, in 1920, Goldsmith and his architectural engineering department's faculty created KU's Bachelor of Architecture degree program. Architecture and architectural engineering were in a combined department in KU's School of Engineering until 1969 when the School of Architecture and Urban Design (SAUD) was organized. The SAUD was not departmentalized, and had three programs: architecture, architectural engineering, and urban planning. The architectural engineering program was managed jointly by the SAUD and the School of Engineering until 2001 when it merged with civil and environmental engineering, but architecture faculty still participate in teaching KU ARCEs and serve on a joint advisory committee.

To more accurately recognize the urban planning program, the SAUD changed its name to the School of Architecture and Urban Planning (SAUP). In 2009 the design programs from the discontinued School of Fine Arts jointed the SAUP, and the school was renamed to the School of Architecture, Design, and Planning (SADP). The other portions of the School of Fine Arts were transferred to the College of Liberal Arts and Sciences (CLAS), and a new School of Music was organized.

The Design Department traces its roots at the University of Kansas to 1885 via the creation of the Department of Art in the School of Music and Art. The Design Department was founded in 1921.

In 2017, the Urban Planning department was merged into KU's School of Public Affairs and Administration. Accordingly, the SADP was renamed to the School of Architecture and Design (ArcD). A new degree program in interior design was created too as part of the newly renamed ArcD school.

== International programs ==
=== Study Abroad ===
- Australia
- Denmark
- England
- France
- Germany
- Ireland
- Scotland

=== Summer Sessions Abroad ===
- Austria
- England
- Berlin, Germany (studio-based)
- Siena, Italy (studio-based)
- Spain

== School traditions ==
- Studio 804, named after a graduate-level studio course, is the most visible arm of the School's design-build efforts. Distinguished Professor Dan Rockhill has led this group for two decades, and his and the students' efforts have received many national recognitions
- Recognition Ceremony—The School's graduation ceremony, held in addition to the university's Commencement Ceremony im May of each year

== Facilities ==
- Marvin Hall—The main building of the School
- Chalmers Hall—recently renamed from Art & Design
- Marvin Studios
- Snow Hall
- Center for Design Research
- Design-Build Center—Design-Build Studio and Construction Space in Lawrence's East Hills Business Park
- Spencer Museum of Art—Includes the Murphy Art and Architecture Library

== Deans ==
- Charles Howard Kahn (1969–1980)
- W. Max Lucas (1981–1993)
- John Gaunt (1994–2015)
- Mahesh Daas (2015–2018)
- Mahbub Rashid (2018–Present)

== Student organizations ==
- Alpha Rho Chi (APX) architectural professional and social organization
- American Institute of Architecture Students (AIAS)
- U.S. Green Building Council (USGBC-student chapter)
- APA-Kansas Association of Planning Students (APA/KAPS)
- Industrial Designers Society of America (IDSA)

== Notable faculty ==
- Wojciech Lesnikowski
- Victor Papanek
- Dan Rockhill
