= Brendan Sullivan =

Brendan Sullivan is the name of:

- Brendan Sullivan (lawyer), American lawyer
- Brendan Sullivan (soccer), American soccer player and coach
