= Tucker Viemeister =

American industrial designer (born 1948)

Tucker L. Viemeister (born August 14, 1948) is an American industrial designer, and founder of Viemeister Industries in New York. Tucker helped found many important design businesses: Smart Design, frog design's New York studio, Razorfish's physical design group, Springtime-USA, and was chief of the lab at the Rockwell Group.

While at Smart, he helped design the influential and award-winning Oxo "Good Grips" kitchen tools. He holds 32 US utility patents. His work is represented in the permanent collections of the Smithsonian Cooper-Hewitt, National Design Museum, New York; the Museum of Modern Art, New York; the Museum of Modern Art, San Francisco; and the Staatliches Museum, Berlin, Germany. Vice President of the Architectural League of New York, Viemeister is also a Fellow of the Industrial Designers Society of America. His numerous awards include 11 selections in the Annual Design Review of ID Magazine, and the first Presidential Design Award in 1984.

== Early life and education ==
Born in Yellow Springs, Ohio as the oldest of four children, Tucker Viemeister was named for a car his father was designing at the time, 1948 Tucker Sedan. Read Viemeister (1923–1993) was an industrial designer, FIDSA, and founded Vie Design Studios with Budd Steinhilber. His mother Beverly Lipsett Viemeister (1927–2005) made many contributions to the Yellow Springs community before completing her degree in secondary education at Antioch College in 1965 and earning her master's in social work in 1968. After that she worked in social services. They had four children: Tucker, Kris, Heidi and Roslyn.

With his brother Kris, Tucker opened a jewelry shop called Ohio Silver. They designed, crafted and sold fine jewelry, stained glass, leather work, and anything else they could make. He went to the Antioch School and Yellow Springs High School.

Viemeister studied for two years at Shimer College, including a year in Oxford, England; Shimer has operated a study abroad program at Oxford University since the early 1960s. He ultimately graduated from Pratt Institute in 1974 with a bachelor's degree in Industrial Design (BID). He helped his Pratt Institute classmate Ted Muehling start his jewelry career.

== Career ==
In 1979, Viemeister began working with Davin Stowell, and six years later they founded Smart Design, Inc. Their most successful products are the award-winning Oxo "Good Grips" universal kitchen tools, the advanced technology Serengeti sunglasses and their packages and catalogs, Black & Decker's Metropolitan toaster, the ergonomic/psychonomic home phones for Cicena, a tea brewer for Cuisinart, and Joe Boxer watches with Nicholas Graham for Timex.

In 1997, Hartmut Esslinger asked him to open a frogdesign studio in New York City. "Genius Watch" in BusinessWeek said: "Two of the most famous and mercurial figures in the product-design world are linking up." From 1999 to 2001, Viemeister carried a new dimension to the digital giant, Razorfish. As Executive Vice President, Research and Development, he built the physical industrial design capabilities and helped direct Razorfish on a global level. He created internal programs like "Flying Fish," "School of Fish" and "science projects." In 2001, Viemeister opened the American branch of the Dutch design firm, Springtime, a global strategic consultancy for clients such as Heineken, Nike, and Toyota.

Viemeister began working with architect David Rockwell in 2001. They founded the multi-disciplinary collaborative "Studio Red", dedicated to innovation for Coca-Cola. Tucker was Lab Chief, heading research and development at the Rockwell Group. The Lab encompasses digital interaction design, the material and image library, modeling and prototyping resources. The Lab focus is to explore the human relationship with technology, and its effect on experience. This activity includes: science and technology consultation, in-house design and creation of interactive environments/objects, and maintaining networks of technology solution providers. Key projects were the JetBlue terminal 5 Market Place at JFK, the interactive introduction installation for the Venice Architecture Biennale and the Cosmopolitan casino in Las Vegas.

In 2012, Viemeister joined Ralph Appelbaum Associates to design exhibitions, working on the Boris Yeltsin Center and the New York Experience before Hurricane Sandy flooded the building and cut their collaboration short. In the same year, he established Viemeister Industries as a platform to support his work.

The designer was called “Guru” by BusinessWeek (August 1997), a "scruffy brand-meister" by the Architect's Newspaper (February 2006), and "Industrial Design’s Elder Wunderkind" when ID included him in America's hottest 40. In 2007 New York magazine recognized him as a "Living Design Innovator".

== Marriage and family ==
He married Sarah Verdone (1965–2010), a freelance writer and blogger who worked for I.D. magazine. They had two daughters together, Josephine and Louisa, and lived in New York. Verdone died in March 2010.

Together with the Lower Manhattan Cultural Council (LMCC), her family and associates established a new annual literary award in her name. It was awarded for the first time in May 2011 to the writer Emily Rubin, for her work, including her debut novel Stalina (2011).

== Academic and civic activities ==
Viemeister serves as chair of the Rowena Kostellow Fund, on the board of the Architectural League of New York, was Chair of the Cooper Hewitt Museum's Professional Designers Advisory Committee, a Director of The American Center for Design (1996–2000), and a Fellow of The Industrial Designers Society of America.

He has taught at Yale University, the Pratt Institute, Parsons School of Design, California Institute of the Arts, the University of Cincinnati, and École Nationale Supérieure de Création Industrielle. He is Adjunct Assistant Professor of Communications at New York University's Interactive Telecommunications Program (ITP).

== Designs ==
- National Mall wayfinding system (with Wyman and Cannan)
- OXO Good Grips kitchen tools (with Smart Design)
- Serengeti sunglasses for Corning (with Smart Design)
- Joe Boxer watches for Timex (with Smart Design)
- Black & Decker Metropolitan toaster (with Smart Design)
- Pool Chair (with Steve Holt and Lisa Krohn)
- Phonebook telephone answering machine (with Lisa Krohn)
- Coke Cruiser (with Springtime and Rockwell Group)
- Red Lounge (for Coca-Cola with Rockwell Group)
- Sheraton Hotel Lobby (with Rockwell Group)
- Hall of Fragments (Venice Architecture Biennale with the Rockwell Group Lab)
- Jet Blue Terminal 5 "Market Place" (Rockwell Group)
- Cosmopolitan Casino Chandelier Bar and West Lobby (Rockwell Group)
- Jamie Oliver Food Revolution truck (Rockwell Group and TED prize)
- LED walls at Baby's All Right

== Books ==
Work featured in the following:

- Gail Greet Hannah, Elements of Design: Rowena Reed Kostellow and the Structure of Visual Relationships, Princeton Architectural Press, NYC
- Product Design 6, an industrial design compendium, published by PBC International ISBN 0866362800
