= Meyer Manufacturing =

Cookware distributor based in Vallejo, California, United States

Meyer Manufacturing Company Limited
- Native name: 美亞製造廠有限公司
- Industry: Cookware
- Founded: July 27, 1951; 75 years ago
- Headquarters: 382 Kwun Tong Road, Kwun Tong, Hong Kong
- Website: meyerinternational.com

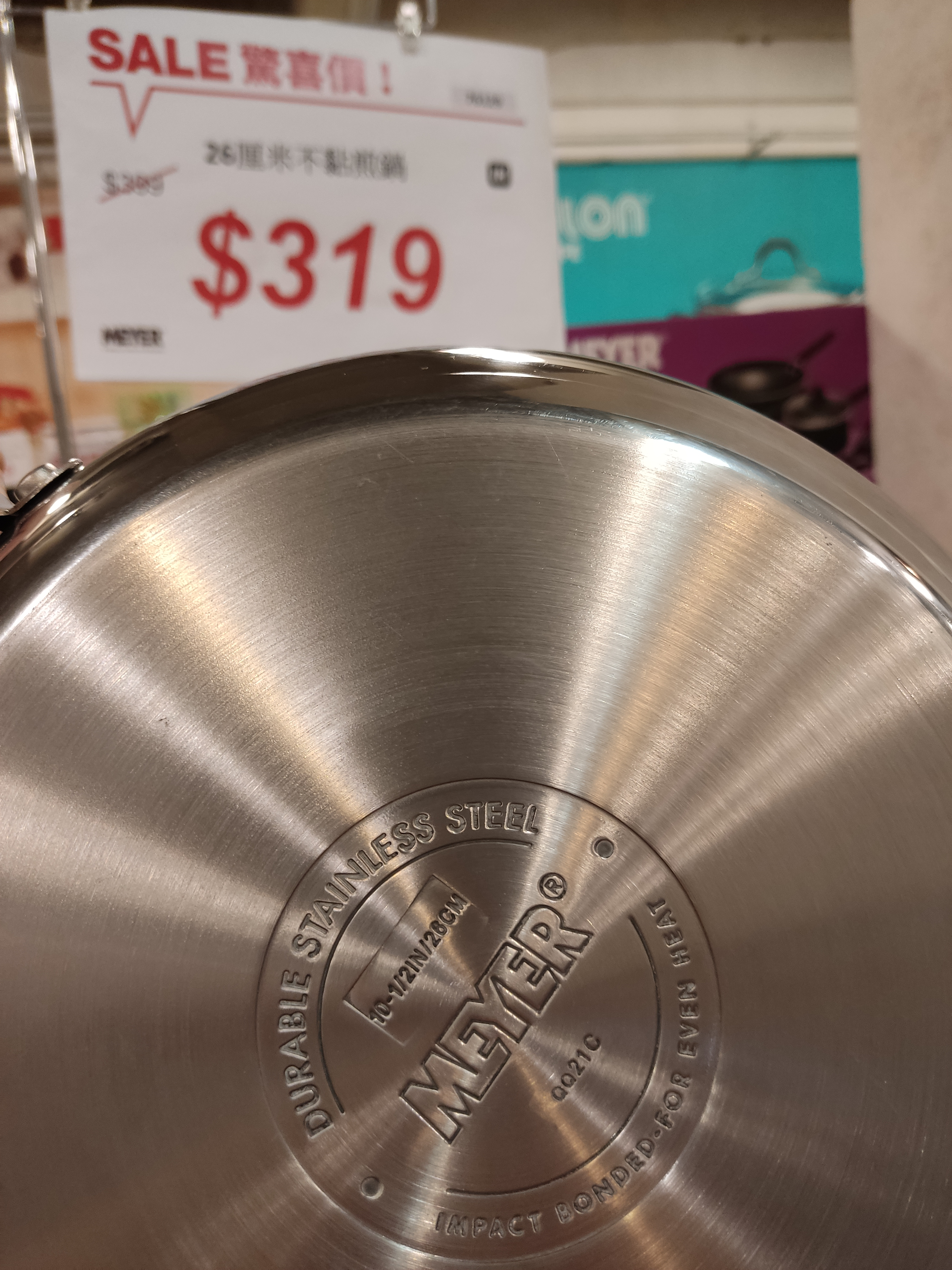
A Meyer-branded stainless steel pan

Meyer Manufacturing Company Limited (Chinese: 美亞製造廠有限公司) is a cookware distributor based in Hong Kong. It is the largest cookware distributor in the United States and second largest in the world. The name of the firm is a transliteration of the Chinese words '美亞', which means 'beautiful' (mei) and 'Asia' (yah).

Cookware labels or lines for which Meyer is the parent firm include Circulon, Anolon, Anyday, the now-defunct Steelon range, NapaStyle, SilverStone (under license from DuPont), Rachael Ray, Paula Deen, Cake Boss, Ruffoni, Ayesha Curry, Joe Wicks, Breville Cookware (under license from Breville Group), Prestige and BonJour. Meyer owns the license for cookware produced under the Farberware label in addition to producing private label cookware for Macy's and Sur La Table.

== History ==
Meyer was founded in Hong Kong in 1951 with a focus on aluminum goods manufacturing and changed to cookware beginning in 1971 with the ascension of Stanley K. Cheng as CEO and chief inventor. In 1972, the first line of cookware produced by Meyer was sold in London. Marketing distribution centers in Liverpool, England, and Milwaukee, Wisconsin, were founded in 1976 and 1980, respectively. Meyer's cookware is manufactured and distributed internationally with factories in China, Thailand and Italy. Cookware lines are stainless steel, hard-anodized aluminum, and non-stick aluminum. The parent manufacturing firm is still based in Hong Kong while the distribution company moved to California in 1992. Revenues for the parent and subsidiary distributor were $287 million (US) for fiscal year 2005.

== Cookware innovations ==
Meyer Corporation developed Circulon in 1984 with the innovation of non-stick cookware bonded to hard-anodized aluminum and tiny grooves in the interior that reduced abrasion of the Teflon surface. The "high-low food release system" was developed and patented by Stanley K. Cheng. The development of Anolon was to satisfy the marketplace which desired thicker gauge non-stick pans that were also dishwasher safe. The Anolon technology was not patented and was quickly incorporated by rivals into their own cookware lines.

== Affiliates ==
Meyer Corporation, the US affiliate of Meyer Manufacturing, was founded in 1981 and is based in Vallejo, California, United States. In January 2018, Mitchell Loring retired as president of the company.
