= Sam Farber =

American businessman

- Born: November 16, 1924; New York City, US
- Died: June 16, 2013 (aged 88)
- Education: B.A. Harvard University
- Occupation: Businessman
- Spouse(s): Joan Levine (divorced); Betsey Wells Kriegsman
- Children: 4

Samuel Farber (November 16, 1924 – June 16, 2013) was an American industrial designer and businessman.

Farber and his son, John Farber, co-founded OXO, a manufacturer of kitchen utensils and housewares. Farber is credited with revolutionizing the kitchen utensil industry by developing and introducing a line of utensils with plastic-coated black handles through OXO. While more expensive than traditional utensils, the new soft, black handled utensils proved to be a success with consumers.

== Early life ==
Sam Farber was born on November 16, 1924, in New York City, though he was raised in nearby Yonkers, New York, the son of Rose (née Winograd) and Louis Farber. His father founded the Sheffield Silver Company and Farber Brothers, which sold serving ware; and served as the president of the Jewish Community Center of Yonkers. He had one brother, Israel Farber. His uncle, Simon Farber, founded Farberware, which manufactures kitchen appliances and cookware.

Farber served in North Africa and Turkey during World War II as a member of the Army Air Forces. He received a bachelor's degree in economics from Harvard University in 1946.

== Career ==
=== Copco ===
In 1960, Farber founded Copco, which manufactured enamel-coated, cast iron cookware. He sold Copco in 1982, largely retiring from the industry at the time of the sale.

=== OXO ===
Farber founded OXO as a result of improvements he made to an everyday vegetable peeler. While vacationing in a rented home in southern France, his wife, Betsy Farber, who suffered from arthritis, was trying to peel apples, which proved difficult using a peeler with a standard design. The difficulties presented by available peelers (and their handles) sparked an idea for Sam for a more inclusive design. He and his son, John, hired Smart Design, an industrial design firm based in New York City, with whom they created a new product line of kitchen utensils fitted with soft plastic-coated black handles, which made them easier to hold and use, and more aesthetically appealing than other utensils.

Farber unveiled the new line at the Gourmet Products Show in San Francisco, California, in 1990. He named his company "OXO" for its "backward, upside-down and vertical graphic symmetry." Farber's OXO products were more expensive than competitors', but the line proved a hit with consumers, who were willing to pay more for the new, easier-to-use utensils.

The Farber family sold OXO to General Housewares Corporation in 1992. OXO is currently owned by Helen of Troy Limited, as of 2013.

=== Mario Batali products ===
Sam and John Farber later created a line of products sold by chef Mario Batali.

=== Boards ===
An art collector, Farber served on the board of directors for the American Folk Art Museum in Manhattan.

== Personal life ==
Farber was a longtime resident of Manhattan but lived in Lexington, Massachusetts, during his later years.

Farber was married twice. His first marriage to Joan Levine ended in divorce; they had two sons, John Farber (born c. 1976, married in 1996 to Wendyll Brown) and Thomas Farber, a criminal court judge in New York. In 1985, he married Betsey Wells Kriegsman, an architect, in a nondenominational ceremony in New York City; he has two stepchildren from her previous marriage, Mark Kriegsman and Sue Kriegsman.

== Death ==
Farber died in East Meadow, New York of complications from a fall on June 16, 2013, at the age of 88.
