= Eleven LLC =

Product development studio

ELEVEN, LLC
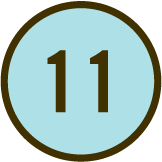
- Company type: Private
- Founded: 1996
- Headquarters: Boston, Massachusetts, United States
- Website: eleven.net

ELEVEN, LLC is a product development studio with offices in Boston, Massachusetts and New York City, New York. The studio was founded in 1996 by Ben Beck, Dave Harting, Doug Marsden and Glen Walter. Since then the company has designed products and experiences across multiple categories: from consumer goods and housewares, to electronics, medical machinery, sporting goods, and furniture.

The company has between 11 and 20 employees providing services including Industrial Design, Mechanical Engineering, Communication Design, Business Strategy, and Design Research. The company has developed an unusual business model, in which the traditional fee for service work is supplemented with licensing and royalties-driven work.

The studio has licensed a wide range of its own consumer products. Much of their early licensing work was for products in the pet industry. Working with Aspen Pets, the company designed the walkabout retractable dog leash. Later, the company designed Petmate cat litter boxes such as the Clean Step Litter Box, which is enclosed to prevent the cat from trailing litter out of the box and to provide added privacy for the pet.

They developed Burton’s snowboarding step-in boot technology, SI and PSI, when the company was emerging as an early leader in equipment for the sport. Since designing the SI line, ELEVEN has continued to work with Burton on their binding designs, and provided periodic platform overhaul.

The company teamed up with STX Lacrosse to design a Gary Gait signature line.

The company also designed OXO's barware line, incorporating the Good Grips technology into drinking paraphernalia.

The studio has worked with Procter & Gamble on household products and strategic brand innovation for brands including Cascade, Gillette, Secret, Duracell, Febreze, Tide, Vicks, Mr. Clean, Folgers and Sunny D.

== Culture ==
ELEVEN got its name from the 1984 film This Is Spinal Tap directed by Rob Reiner. In one scene, the world's loudest rock band demonstrates that their amp controls go up to 11 instead of 10, making it louder than others. “These go up to eleven”.

Partner Glen Walter delivered a keynote address entitled Stimulating Creativity Through Design and Strategy in Dublin in 2002 at the Seminar in Enterprise Ireland. In this address regarding ELEVEN's philosophy, Walter advocated that the design industry avoid esoteric beauty and embrace "products that add value in inventive ways that help the user". In an article printed in Design Management Review, Walter further advocates for a measure of social and ecological responsibility in design. The company's ethics have been influenced by Buckminster Fuller and Victor Papanek.

The company hosts annual industry-wide parties on November 11.

ELEVEN has won several awards over the years, including:

- 3 IDEA/Business Week Awards for the Cosmo Camera, Cap Rack, and SurgeArrest Notebook Pro Surge Protector
- 4 ID Magazine Awards
- 4 Good Design Awards for SI Binding in 1998, for PictureTel's COSMO Camera for Video Conferencing in 1999, for mimio flipChart in 2000, and for Walkabout Retractable Leash in 2002.
- 4 PC Magazine Best New Product Awards - Essential Hardware
- 2 Design Plus Awards
- 1 AIGA Gold Award.
- 1 iF Design Award

== Media ==
ELEVEN has been featured in:

- Time
- Business Week
- Fortune
- Inc.
- Boston Business Journal
- Graphis Inc.
- Design Management Institute
- PC Magazine

== Jurors ==
ELEVEN designers and engineers have been jurors in:

- Appliance Manufacturer Magazine

== Affiliations ==
ELEVEN is affiliated with:

- DMI
- IDSA
- Northeastern University Engineering Curriculum Advisory Board
- AIGA
- Boston Area Solidworks Users Group
- Certified Solidworks Professionals
- New England Pro/E Users Group
- DIGMA
- Boston Design Museum
