= FIDSA =

FIDSA may refer to:

- Fellow of the Industrial Designers Society of America
- Fellow of the Infectious Diseases Society of America
