= Larry Sullivan (soccer) =

American soccer coach

Personal information
- Place of birth: Philadelphia, Pennsylvania, U.S.
- Position: Midfielder

College career
Years	Team	Apps	(Gls)
1970–1973	Temple Owls		

Managerial career
- 1978–1979: St. Joseph's University (assistant)
- 1983–1991: Father Judge High School
- 1991–2007: Villanova University

Larry Sullivan is an American former soccer coach.

== Career ==
From 1991 to 2007, Sullivan served as the head men's soccer coach at Villanova University. In 17 years, he compiled a 104–155–28 losing record. Prior to that from 1983 to 1991, Sullivan served as the head men's soccer coach at Father Judge High School. He started his coaching career in 1978 at St. Joseph's University. He was also the head coach of the Camden Catholic High School varsity boys soccer team in Cherry Hill, NJ.

Sullivan was a three-year varsity letter winner at Northeast Catholic High School, where he played both baseball and soccer. He was voted All-Catholic twice and was part of three PCL championship teams. After high school, he joined the United States Army, and served in Vietnam. He received a Purple Heart, two Bronze Stars of medal, and the Army Accommodation Award of valor. Sullivan then played College soccer at Temple U. from 1970 to 1972. Sullivan then played for the Philadelphia Spartans Professional Soccer Team. Sullivan has been inducted into the North Catholic Alumni, the North Catholic Soccer, the Father Judge, and SEPA Halls of Fame.

== Personal life ==
Sullivan is the grandfather of Philadelphia Union players Quinn and Cavan Sullivan, the father of Brendan Sullivan, and the uncle of former player Chris Albright.
