= Baby's All Right =

Bar and music venue in Williamsburg, Brooklyn

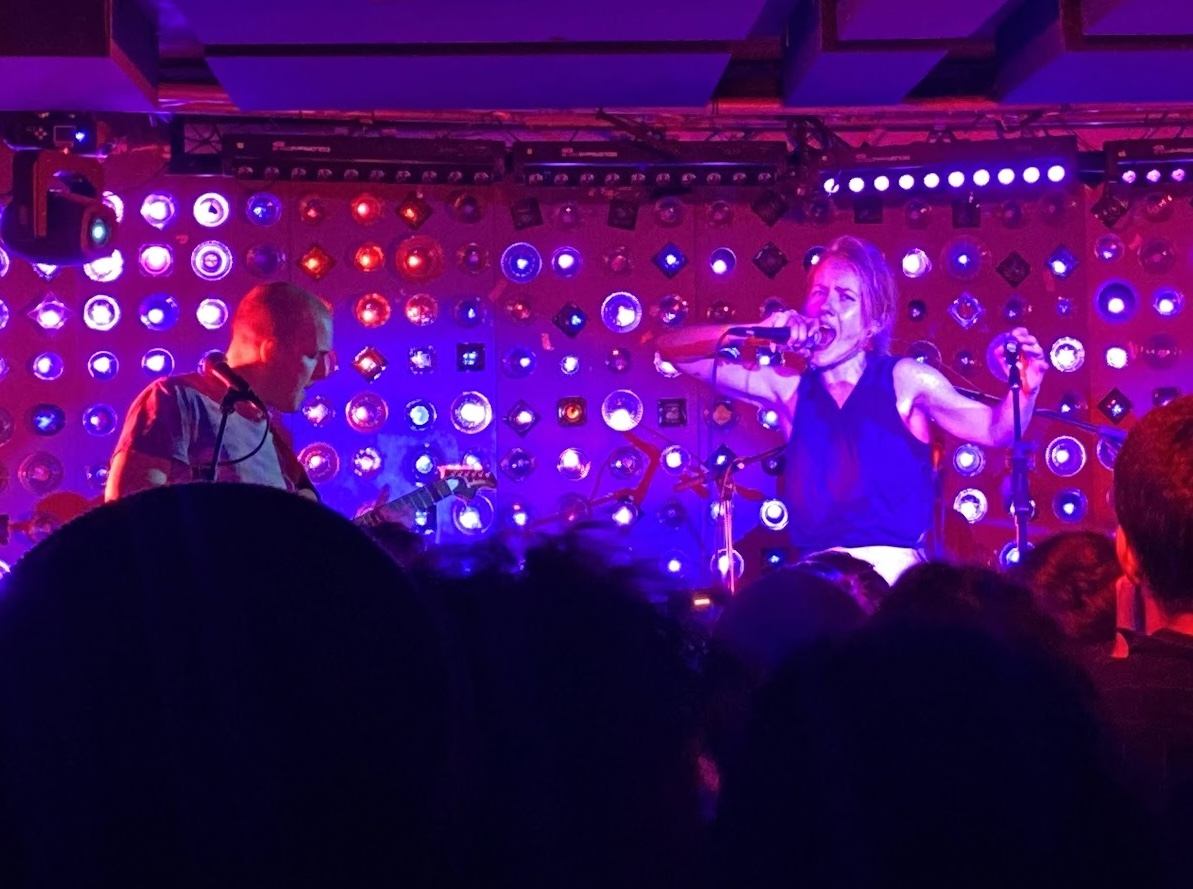
- Pom Poko performs at Baby's All Right in 2025
- Interactive map of Baby's All Right
- Address: 146 Broadway; Williamsburg, Brooklyn, New York City 11211; United States
- Coordinates: 40°42′36″N 73°57′48″W
- Owner: Zachary Mexico; Billy Jones; Tom Moore
- Seating type: Standing
- Capacity: 330

Construction
- Opened: 2013

Website
- babysallright.com

Baby's All Right is a bar and music venue in the Williamsburg neighborhood of Brooklyn. The venue is known as a hub for Brooklyn's indie music scene, and its programming ranges from rock and jazz to electronic and experimental. Notable acts have included SZA, Lorde, Billie Eilish, Janani K. Jha, A$AP Rocky, and Ariel Pink.

== History ==
Baby's All Right opened in 2013 in the former production facility of Hygrade Food Products, a historic hot dog manufacturer. The venue was co-founded by bookers Zachary Mexico and Billy Jones and constructed by Hecho, Inc. The venue was part of an indie music revival in Williamsburg that included the openings of several small venues in 2012 and 2013.

The venue has cultivated a reputation for booking acts at the forefront of indie music; Byline called it a leading presenter of the 2020s "indie sleaze revival." In 2017, the venue's commercial success led its owners to pursue a location in Los Angeles' Chinatown neighborhood; it is not clear if the new venue ever opened.

The bar became part of a social media feud when, in 2017, it posted a picture of what it said was Kendall Jenner's $24 bar tab with no tip; the Instagram post's caption read, "Don't forget to tip your bartender." Jenner said she had tipped in cash.

In 2024, the owners said Baby's All Right would pursue an expansion into Manhattan's East Village, moving into the space on Avenue A formerly occupied by The Pyramid Club. This venue, named Night Club 101, opened in 2025.

In April 2025, the venue was referenced in the lyrics of Lorde's song "What Was That".

Co-founder and owner Billy Jones died on June 7, 2025 at the age of 45 from glioblastoma.

In October, 2026, The City of New York dedicated the block in front of Baby's in the name of its late co-founder, Billy Jones.

== Space ==
Located at 146 Broadway off Bedford Avenue in South Williamsburg, Baby's All Right consists of a performance space as well as a bar and restaurant, occupying 5,000 square feet in total. The venue's decor evokes a retro sensibility; The New York Times noted its "astrological charts, contoured ceilings and overlapping swaths of wallpaper scraps" evoked the feeling of a "Wes Anderson-curated mother ship." The eatery offers a full dinner menu as well as small plates, with a Latin American focus, and hosts a popular weekend brunch service.

The performance space is located immediately behind the bar and includes a retractable wall to reduce sound bleed. Both the bar and stage feature programmable LED walls designed by Tucker Viemeister.

== Notable Acts ==
- Charli XCX
- Dua Lipa
- Lorde
- Porches
- Cypress Hill
- Bill Callahan
- Pharaoh Sanders
- Billie Eilish
- Jack Harlow
- Azealia Banks
- Phoebe Bridgers
- Willow Smith
- Beach House
- Spoon
- Blood Orange
- Baby Keem
- SZA
- Lil Yachty
- Jack White
- Billie Joe Armstrong
- A$AP Rocky
- Mac Demarco
- James Murphy
- Doja Cat
