= Edward Mazria =

American architect

- Born: 1940 (age 85–86); Brooklyn, New York, United States
- Other name: Ed Mazria
- Education: BArch, Pratt Institute; MArch, Univ. of New Mexico; Hon. Doctor of Architecture, Illinois Institute of Technology
- Occupation: Architect
- Organization: Architecture 2030
- Basketball career

Career information
- High school: Lafayette (Brooklyn, New York)
- College: Pratt Institute
- NBA draft: 1962: 11th round, 88th overall pick
- Drafted by: New York Knicks
- Stats at Basketball Reference
- Website: www.architecture2030.org

Edward Mazria is an American architect, author and educator. He is a graduate of Lafayette High School, played basketball in high school and in college at Pratt Institute in Brooklyn, New York, and was drafted by the New York Knickerbockers in 1962. After receiving his Bachelor of Architecture Degree from the Pratt Institute in 1963 he spent two years as an architect in the Peace Corps in Arequipa, Peru. He later worked with the firm of Edward Larrabee Barnes in New York before completing his master's degree and beginning a teaching and research career at the University of New Mexico in 1973.

His architecture and renewable energy research at both UNM and the University of Oregon established his leadership in the field of resource conservation and passive heating, cooling and daylighting design. His design methodology, developed at that time and presented in The Passive Solar Energy Book, is currently in use worldwide.

Since forming the architecture and planning firm Mazria Associates, Inc. in 1978, he has completed award-winning architecture and planning projects from the day-lit Mt. Airy Public Library in North Carolina to the Rio Grande Botanic Garden Conservatory in New Mexico.

Mazria closed his architecture practice in 2006 and is currently the Founder and CEO of Architecture 2030, a think tank developing real-world solutions for 21st century problems including the AIA+2030 Professional Education Series, 2030 Palette, China Accord, and the 2030 Districts movement in North American cities. He developed the “Roadmap to Zero Emissions” and is currently working with cities across the U.S. to develop pathways for “zero” to “80%” greenhouse gas emissions reductions by 2050.

In 2019, Mazria was a keynote speaker at Verdical Group's annual Net Zero Conference.

== Published work ==
His published material includes technical papers, articles for professional magazines, and a number of published works including the following:

- The Passive Solar Energy Book, Rodale Press 1979
- It's the Architecture Stupid!, Solar Today Magazine, May/June 2003
- Turning Down the Global Thermostat, Metropolis Magazine, October 2003
- Blueprint for Disaster, On Earth Magazine, Summer 2005

His building designs have been published in Architecture, Progressive Architecture, Metropolis, Architectural Record, Landscape Architecture, Architectural Digest, Process, Kenchiku Bunka, Public Garden, Solar Today, ArchitectureWeek, Texas Architect, The Wall Street Journal and the New York Times.

== Recent work ==
Most recently Mazria has reshaped the national and international dialogue on global warming to incorporate building design and the “Building Sector”. His research includes U.S. and global building sector analysis and greenhouse gas mitigation strategies.

He is the architect of both the AIA's position statement and the U.S. Conference of Mayor’s Resolution #50 adopting the “2030 Challenge” as a means of dramatically reducing building sector greenhouse gas emissions. His report, "Roadmap to Zero Emissions" submitted to the UN Framework Convention on Climate Change, outlines his strategy for addressing what he believes is today's most pressing global challenge.

He is the founder of Architecture 2030, a climate change organization. He currently speaks nationally and internationally on the subject of climate change and the built environment.

== See also ==
- The 2030 Challenge
- Passive solar building design
- Conservation (ethic)
