= Cavan Sullivan =

American soccer player (born 2009)

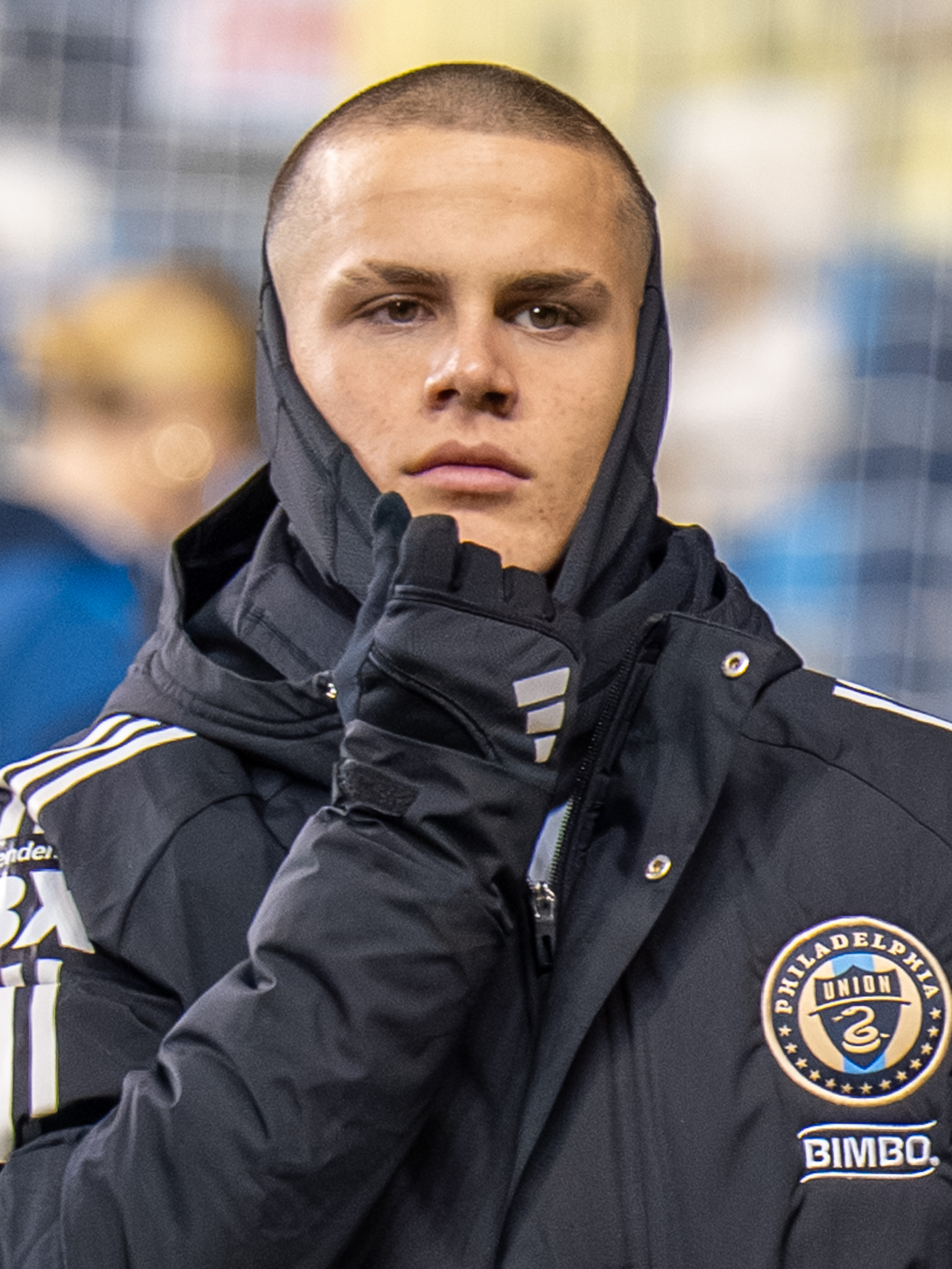
- Sullivan with the Philadelphia Union in 2025

Personal information
- Full name: Cavan Ayaz Sullivan
- Date of birth: September 28, 2009 (age 17)
- Place of birth: Philadelphia, Pennsylvania, U.S.
- Height: 5 ft 7 in (1.70 m)
- Position: Attacking midfielder

Team information
- Current team: Philadelphia Union
- Number: 6

Youth career
- 2018–2020: FC Delco
- 2020–2024: Philadelphia Union

Senior career*
Years	Team	Apps	(Gls)
2024	Philadelphia Union II	2	(0)
2024–	Philadelphia Union	43	(9)
2024–2025	→ Philadelphia Union II (loan)	30	(10)

International career^{‡}
2023–2024	United States U15	9	(5)
2024–	United States U17	12	(4)
2026–	United States U19	1	(1)
2026–	United States	4	(1)
Medal record
Representing United States
Men's soccer
CONCACAF Under-15 Championship
Winner	2023 Dominican Republic
- * Club domestic league appearances and goals as of 00:11, November 8, 2026 (UTC) ‡ National team caps and goals as of 02:01, November 18, 2026 (UTC)

Cavan Ayaz Sullivan (born September 28, 2009) is an American professional soccer player who plays as an attacking midfielder for the Philadelphia Union of Major League Soccer and the United States national team.

In March 2024, Sullivan became the most expensive homegrown player in Major League Soccer history, signing with the Philadelphia Union until 2028. At age 14, he became the youngest player to debut in a league match for a major American or Canadian professional sports team and alternated with the reserve team. In the second half of the 2026 season, Sullivan established himself as a regular with the senior team at age 16, breaking the league record for the most goal contributions by a teenager and becoming the youngest player to win the MLS Player of the Month award by more than three years.

Representing the United States at various youth levels, he won the 2023 CONCACAF Under-15 Championship with the under-15 team. Sullivan made his senior national team debut at age 16 in September 2026, becoming the youngest goalscorer in national team history only one week later.

== Early life ==
Cavan was born on September 28, 2009, in Philadelphia, Pennsylvania.

As a youth player, Sullivan joined the youth academy of American side Philadelphia Union in 2020. He helped the club win the 2023 Generation Adidas Cup.

== Club career ==
=== 2024–2025: Debut and development ===
On March 24, 2024, Sullivan made his professional debut, coming on in the 56th-minute in an MLS Next Pro match for Philadelphia Union II. Sullivan provided an assist in the 86th-minute in a 2–1 victory for Philadelphia. On May 9, 2024, he signed a homegrown contract with the Philadelphia Union until 2028, making him the fifth-youngest player to sign a first-team contract in Major League Soccer history. The deal was the most expensive homegrown deal in MLS history. Sullivan and his family confirmed to ESPN that the contract has a clause that calls for a transfer to Premier League club Manchester City once he turns 18, with the club's scouts describing him as the "most exciting 14-year old in the world."

Sullivan made his Major League Soccer debut for the Philadelphia Union on July 17, 2024. At 14 years and 293 days old, Sullivan became the youngest player to appear in a league match for a major professional sports league in the United States and Canada, breaking Freddy Adu's record set in 2004 by 13 days. He mostly played for the Philadelphia Union II reserve team to develop in the 2024 MLS Next Pro season, finishing with eight goal contributions. On July 23, he played for the MLS Next East team in the MLS Next All-Star Game and was named the most valuable player for his goal and assist in the East's 4–2 victory. He returned to the Union II in the 2025 MLS Next Pro season, gaining 11 goal contributions in Next Pro before returning to the first team as a substitute option.

=== 2026: Breakthrough ===
On February 26, 2026, at age 16, Sullivan scored two goals, his first for the Union, and made two assists in a 7–0 win over Defence Force in round one of the CONCACAF Champions Cup, winning Man of the Match. He scored his first league goal for Philadelphia in a 4–3 loss to Orlando City on May 13, coming on as a substitute. All of this led to him being ranked #39 on the 2026 Goal NXGN list of the 50 best teenage wonderkids in the world in March.

Becoming a regular starter for the senior team in the second half of the 2026 season following the summer 2026 FIFA World Cup window, he scored and earned an assist on August 9 in a 3–1 win over Necaxa in the 2026 Leagues Cup. On August 16, he added two assists in a 3–2 win over New York City FC. Sullivan received a red card on August 19 near the end of a 2–2 draw with Inter Miami. He became involved in a scuffle after his older brother, Quinn, was stepped on by Miami player Ian Fray. Five days later, however, Sullivan's red card and an accompanying fine were unanimously rescinded by the league's Independent Review Panel. In the following match against Austin FC on August 22, Sullivan scored his team's only goal in a 1–1 draw. He scored in his third consecutive game on September 5 against CF Montréal, breaking Freddy Adu's league record of 11 goal contributions (goals and assists) by a 16 year old. Sullivan also became the first teenager in league history to have a goal contribution in five successive matches. On September 13, he scored his first brace, tallying two goals in a 5–0 victory over San Diego FC. He scored again in a 4–3 comeback victory over Sporting Kansas City on September 19, giving him six goals and two assists in a string of six games. On September 30, Sullivan was named MLS Player of the Month for September, becoming the youngest-ever player to win the award at 17 years and two days old. On October 2, he was headlined on the 2026 The Guardian Next Generation list of the 60 best young talents in the world.

On October 10, returning from his first international break, he created an assist in the 2–1 win over Real Salt Lake, tying the league record of 20 goal contributions by a teenager. In the following game, on October 14, he tallied his 21st goal contribution with an assist against Chicago Fire, claiming the record for himself. Despite this achievement, after the match Sullivan was disappointed with his performance, saying "I played sort of terrible tonight." He suffered a knee injury on October 17 that sidelined him for a month. On October 20, Sullivan was named the top player in the league's annual 22 Under 22 list, and became the youngest player to win the award. He fully returned from his injury on November 7, scoring another brace in the 4–1 win over Toronto FC, and extended his record for the most goal contributions by a teenager in a single regular MLS season to 23. The previous record was held by Diego Fagúndez, who had 20 goal contributions in 2013.

Sullivan was named as one of the five finalists for the 2026 MLS Most Valuable Player and became the youngest ever to be nominated for the award, along with being named as one of the three finalists for the MLS Young Player of the Year Award.

== International career ==
Before becoming cap-tied to the United States, Sullivan was eligible to represent the United States, Germany, and Bangladesh. He has stated that playing for the United States was his childhood dream. Representing the United States at several youth levels, he helped the under-15 team win the 2023 CONCACAF Boys' Under-15 Championship.

Sullivan earned his first senior callup by coach Mauricio Pochettino in September 2026, for the first four matches of the 2030 World Cup cycle. At 16 years and 363 days old, he made his senior team debut on September 26 in a 4–1 win over Peru, making him the second youngest American player to debut in the modern era since Freddy Adu in 2006 and the fourth youngest in United States national team history. One week later on October 3, in their 3–0 win over rivals Mexico, Sullivan became the youngest American goalscorer in history at 17 years and five days old by intercepting a pass from goalkeeper Raúl Rangel and chipping him from distance; on only his third appearance for the national team, breaking the previous age record that Mathis Albert had set just five days earlier in the preceding game.

== Style of play ==
A left-footed player, Sullivan is primarily deployed as a midfielder and winger. He is known for his vision, dribbling, and directness.

== Personal life ==
His father, Brendan, played for five clubs over a six-year professional career in the A-League, now known as the USL Championship, the second division of American soccer. Prior to that, Brendan was an All-Ivy League selection at the University of Pennsylvania and before that starred at St. Joseph's Prep in Philadelphia, where he later coached. His paternal grandfather, Larry Sullivan, was a Vietnam War veteran who received the Purple Heart from wounded fingers, who returned to the United States to coach soccer. His mother, Heike, also played NCAA Division I soccer and captained the Penn women's team. He is of German-Bangladeshi descent through his mother; his maternal grandmother was born in Dhaka, Bangladesh, and his maternal grandfather was German-American communication theorist Klaus Krippendorff.

Cavan is the youngest of four children. Cavan's oldest brother, Quinn, plays for the Philadelphia Union. His other older brothers, Declan and Ronan, are also soccer players, who play college soccer for Saint Joseph's University. Cavan's older cousin is Chris Albright, a United States international who played two seasons for the Union, and his grandfather is Larry Sullivan, who served as the head coach at Villanova from 1991 to 2007. Cavan's uncle, Bryan Sullivan, was also on the coaching staff at Villanova.

== Career statistics ==
=== Club ===
As of match played November 21, 2026

Appearances and goals by club, season and competition
Club	Season	League			U.S. Open Cup		Continental		Other		Total	
Club	Season	Division	Apps	Goals	Apps	Goals	Apps	Goals	Apps	Goals	Apps	Goals
Philadelphia Union II	2024	MLS Next Pro	2	0	—		—		—		2	0
Philadelphia Union	2024	MLS	3	0	0	0	—		—		3	0
Philadelphia Union	2025	MLS	11	0	3	0	—		2 (Note: Appearances in MLS Cup playoffs)	0	16	0
Philadelphia Union	2026	MLS	29	9	—		4 (Note: Appearances in CONCACAF Champions Cup)	2	3 (Note: Two appearances and one goal in Leagues Cup, one appearance in MLS Cup playoffs)	1	36	12
Philadelphia Union	Total		43	9	3	0	4	2	5	1	55	12
Philadelphia Union II (loan)	2024	MLS Next Pro	16	4	—		—		4 (Note: Appearances in MLS Next Pro playoffs)	1	20	5
Philadelphia Union II (loan)	2025	MLS Next Pro	14	6	—		—		—		14	6
Philadelphia Union II (loan)	Total		30	10	—		—		4	1	34	11
Career total			75	19	3	0	4	2	9	2	91	23

=== International ===
As of match played November 17, 2026

Appearances and goals by national team and year
National team	Year	Apps	Goals
United States	2026	4	1
Total		4	1

Scores and results list the United States' goal tally first.

List of international goals scored by Cavan Sullivan
No.	Date	Venue	Opponent	Score	Result	Competition
1	October 3, 2026	State Farm Stadium, Glendale, United States	Mexico	2–0	3–0	Friendly

== Honors ==
Philadelphia Union

- Supporters' Shield: 2025

United States U15

- CONCACAF Under-15 Championship: 2023

Individual

- MLS Player of the Month: September 2026
- MLS 22 Under 22: 2026
