= Farberware =

American kitchenware brand

- Product type: Kitchenware
- Current owner: Meyer Corporation
- Country: United States
- Introduced: 1900; 126 years ago
- Related brands: Circulon (cookware); KitchenAid (cookware and bakeware)
- Markets: International
- Previous owners: Simon Farber; Isadore Farber; Milton Farber
- Tagline: "Tradition of Excellence"
- Website: Official website

Farberware is a brand of kitchen-related cookware and appliances. The company was founded in New York City in 1900 and acquired by Meyer Corporation in 1997.

== History ==
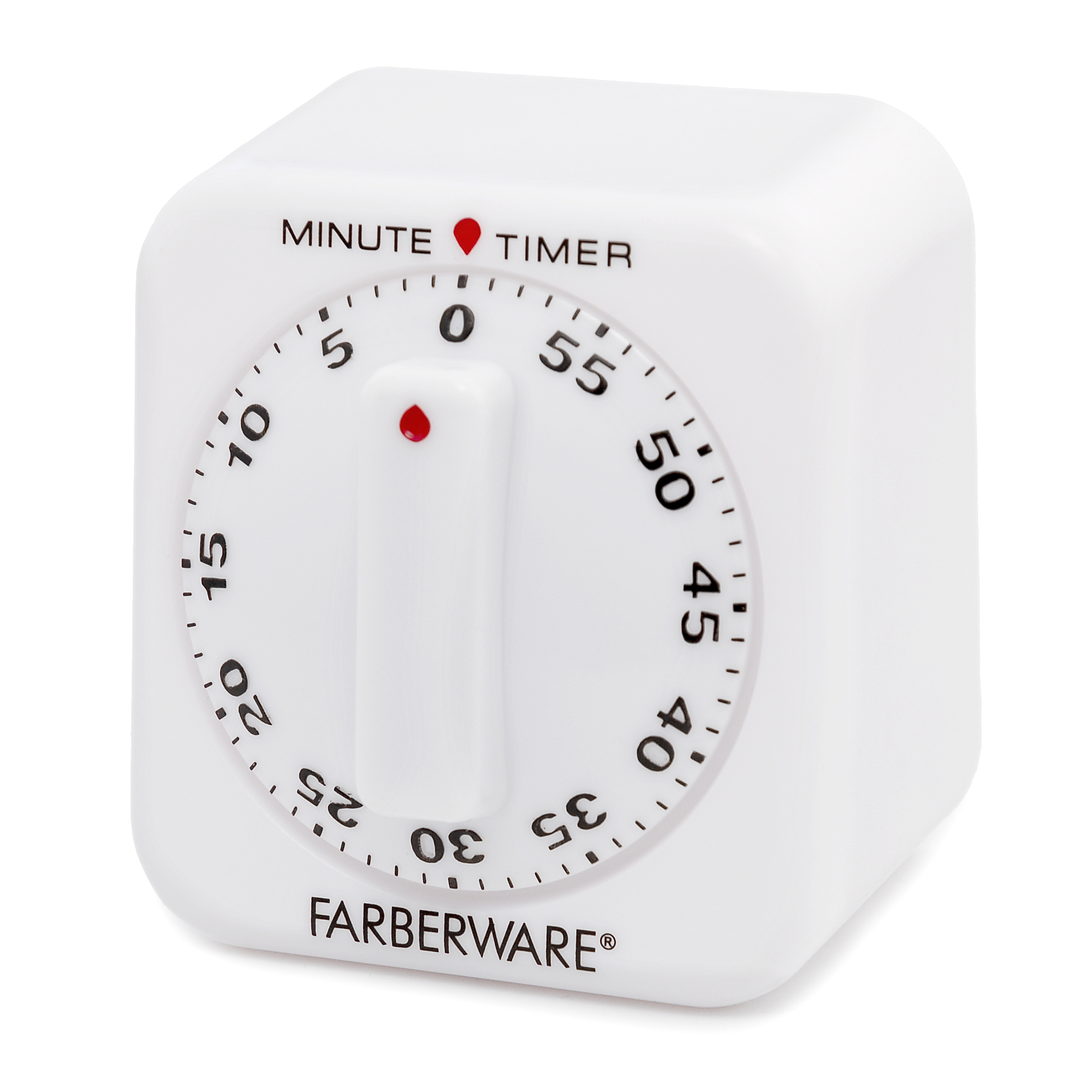
A Farberware-brand minute timer.

Russian immigrant Simon Farber founded S. W. Farber, Inc., in 1897 manufacturing gift trays and racks. The company was officially founded in 1900 and started as a match peddler located on the Lower East Side of Manhattan. It later expanded to Brooklyn, opening a plant there and inventing a clamp-on light.

During the 1940s, Simon's son Isadore became the company's president, and his other son, Milton, became vice president. In 1944, the company moved to The Bronx and expanded into the manufacture of stainless steel pots and pans dubbed Farberware. During World War II, the company assisted the U.S. government in manufacturing small arms. Milton was honored for serving as chairman of production engineering and of the Small Business Mobilization Committee. Simon's nephew Sam Farber joined the company after serving in the Second World War.

Milton became president after Isadore retired, and he opened a factory in Israel. The company was sold to Hanson Industries. Milton remained in his position until his retirement in 1973.

In 1946, the Bronx plant was built on the Bruckner Boulevard between 142nd and 144th streets.

In 1981 Farberware reversed its plans to move from the Bronx after New York City and State agreed to provide the company with $8 million in low-interest loans.

In 1981, New Jersey leased Farberware's factory building, the borough's largest, to U.S. Industries, which pledged to operate for 25 years. U.S. Industries, however, sold the Farberware brand to Boston company Syratech Corporation in 1993.

The company has since undergone numerous name changes.

In 1992, Farberware Millennium, an antiscratch antistick pan, was described as "one of the finest cookware innovations". After testing "1,000 back-and-forth scrapes by a metal spatula" the Millennium pan did not scratch.

In 1993, Farberware's pans were manufactured by Syratech, which contracted with All American Lighting Corporation for recoating of nonstick pans, but All American Lighting failed to process orders promptly.

By 1995, Farberware was among the largest producers of stainless steel cookware in the United States, reporting an "anemic annual earnings of $1 million on sales of $125 million for the fiscal year". Syratech was a $169-million company at the time and paid higher wages than those offered in China or Malaysia. Union members feared that production would be outsourced to those countries with lower wages.

Meyer Corporation acquired the Farberware license in 1997, moving production outside of the US at the cost of over 700 jobs. It honors warranties for cookware made prior to the acquisition.

As of 2007, Farberware products were found at most major retailers, including Walmart.
