= Quinn Sullivan (soccer) =

American soccer player (born 2004)

Personal information
- Full name: Quinn Krippendorff Sullivan
- Date of birth: March 27, 2004 (age 22)
- Place of birth: Philadelphia, Pennsylvania, US
- Height: 5 ft 11 in (1.80 m)
- Positions: Attacking midfielder; winger

Team information
- Current team: Philadelphia Union
- Number: 33

Youth career
- 2016–2019: Philadelphia Union

Senior career*
| Years | Team | Apps | (Gls) |
| 2020–2023 | Philadelphia Union II | 24 | (3) |
| 2021– | Philadelphia Union | 101 | (10) |

International career^{‡}
| 2021–2023 | United States U20 | 19 | (10) |
| 2025– | United States | 3 | (0) |
Medal record
Representing United States
Men's football
CONCACAF Gold Cup
| Runner-up | 2025 Canada–United States |
- * Club domestic league appearances and goals as of March 15, 2025 ‡ National team caps and goals as of June 22, 2025

Quinn Krippendorff Sullivan (born March 27, 2004) is an American professional soccer player who plays as an attacking midfielder or winger for the Philadelphia Union of Major League Soccer and the United States national team.

== Club career ==
Sullivan began his youth career at Fishtown A.C. and then transferred to the Philadelphia Union academy where he attended the prestigious YSC Academy School. He made his professional debut at the age of 16 years old with the club's reserve team, Philadelphia Union II, on July 18, 2020, against the Pittsburgh Riverhounds. He came on as a substitute in the second half.

Sullivan officially signed for the first team on November 12, 2020, as a homegrown player alongside childhood teammate Brandan Craig. Sullivan's contract began as a rostered player for the 2021 season. His first minutes for the Union were late-game substitutions during the Union's first CONCACAF Champions League campaign. Sullivan made his first league start for the Union on June 26 against Chicago Fire, where he scored his first goal to equalize the match at 1–1. His first professional goal for the Union earned Goal of the Week honors, and he subsequently added another GOTW.

== International career ==
Sullivan has represented the United States under-20 team in 19 occasions.

Overall he has scored 10 goals in those appearances and added five assists. In the lead up to the CONCACAF Championship he scored a hat trick as a substitute in a come from behind win over River Plate's reserve team and added another goal in a 2–2 tie versus the Argentina U20's.

In CONCACAF U20 group play, Quinn scored a hat trick in a 3–0 win against Cuba to finish top of the group. He also scored a brace (2 goals) against Nicaragua in the quarterfinals and another goal against the host team, Honduras, in the semifinal. He has tallied three assists and a drawn pk in tournament play as well.

He is eligible to represent the American, German and Bangladeshi national football teams at senior level.

On May 22, 2025, Sullivan was called up by United States national team coach Mauricio Pochettino for training camp in Chicago ahead of matches against Turkey and Switzerland.

== Personal life ==
Sullivan comes from a soccer family: his mother is of Bangladeshi and German origin and his father, Brendan, played for five clubs over a six-year professional career in the A-League. Prior to that, Brendan Sullivan was an All-Ivy selection at University of Pennsylvania and starred at St. Joseph's Prep in Philadelphia. He then went on to coach at his alma mater. Quinn's mother, Heike, played Division I soccer and captained the University of Pennsylvania women's team. Quinn's younger brother Cavan is a U.S. youth international who also plays for Philadelphia Union. His two other brothers, the younger twins Declan and Ronan, are also youth soccer players, with both currently attending YSC Academy and playing for MLS NEXT affiliate FC DELCO.

His cousin is Chris Albright, an American international who played two seasons for the Union, and his grandfather is Larry Sullivan, who served as the head coach at Villanova from 1991 to 2007. Sullivan's uncle, Bryan Sullivan, was a Division I goalkeeper at Philadelphia Textile and was also on the coaching staff at Villanova.

His maternal grandmother is Bangladeshi and his maternal grandfather is Klaus Krippendorff.

== Career statistics ==
=== Club ===
As of match played May 24, 2025

Appearances and goals by club, season and competition
| Club | Season | League | | | U.S. Open Cup | | Continental | | Other | | Total | |
| Club | Season | Division | Apps | Goals | Apps | Goals | Apps | Goals | Apps | Goals | Apps | Goals |
|---|---|---|---|---|---|---|---|---|---|---|---|---|
| Philadelphia Union II | 2020 | USL | 9 | 0 | — | | — | | — | | 9 | 0 |
| Philadelphia Union II | 2022 | MLS Next Pro | 11 | 3 | — | | — | | — | | 11 | 3 |
| Philadelphia Union II | 2023 | MLS Next Pro | 4 | 0 | — | | — | | — | | 4 | 0 |
| Philadelphia Union II | Total | | 24 | 3 | — | | — | | — | | 24 | 3 |
| Philadelphia Union | 2021 | MLS | 21 | 2 | — | | 3 (Note: Appearances in CONCACAF Champions Cup) | 0 | — | | 24 | 2 |
| Philadelphia Union | 2022 | MLS | 17 | 1 | 1 | 0 | — | | — | | 18 | 1 |
| Philadelphia Union | 2023 | MLS | 22 | 2 | — | | 6 | 0 | 8 (Note: Five appearances in Leagues Cup, three appearances in MLS Cup playoffs) | 0 | 36 | 2 |
| Philadelphia Union | 2024 | MLS | 34 | 5 | — | | 4 | 1 | 7 (Note: Appearances in Leagues Cup) | 1 | 45 | 7 |
| Philadelphia Union | 2025 | MLS | 15 | 2 | 1 | 0 | — | | — | | 16 | 2 |
| Philadelphia Union | 2026 | MLS | 0 | 0 | — | | 0 | 0 | 0 | 0 | 0 | 0 |
| Philadelphia Union | Total | | 109 | 12 | 2 | 0 | 13 | 1 | 15 | 1 | 139 | 14 |
| Career total | | | 133 | 15 | 2 | 0 | 13 | 1 | 15 | 1 | 163 | 17 |

=== International ===
As of match played June 22, 2025

Appearances and goals by national team and year
| National team | Year | Apps | Goals |
|---|---|---|---|
| United States | 2025 | 3 | 0 |
| Total | | 3 | 0 |

== Honors ==
Philadelphia Union

- Supporters' Shield: 2025
- MLS Cup runner-up: 2022

United States U20

- CONCACAF U-20 Championship: 2022

Individual

- CONCACAF U-20 Championship Best XI: 2022
