= Brendan Sullivan (soccer) =

American soccer coach

College career
Years	Team	Apps	(Gls)
1993–1995	Penn Quakers		

Senior career*
Years	Team	Apps	(Gls)
1996	Philadelphia Freedom		
1997–1998	Boston Bulldogs	35	(4)
1999–2000	Long Island Rough Riders	33	(3)
2000	Connecticut Wolves	9	(0)
2001	Ocean City Nor'easters	10	(2)
- Carolina Dynamo
- * Club domestic league appearances and goals

Brendan Sullivan is an American soccer coach and former player.

== Playing career ==
After attending St. Joseph's Preparatory School, Sullivan played college soccer for the Penn Quakers at the University of Pennsylvania.

Sullivan began his career with the Philadelphia Freedom, and played professionally for five seasons in the A-League, for the Boston Bulldogs, the Long Island Rough Riders, the Connecticut Wolves, the Ocean City Nor'easters, and the Carolina Dynamo.

== Coaching career ==
In August 2000 he joined the coaching staff at Villanova University, working alongside his father Larry and brother Bryan. In 2009 he was assistant coach at St. Joseph's Preparatory School, before becoming the head coach of Germantown Academy in 2016.

== Personal life ==
Sullivan is married (to Heike, the daughter of Klaus Krippendorff), with four sons, including soccer players Quinn Sullivan and Cavan Sullivan. Sullivan is the son of soccer coach Larry Sullivan, and the cousin of Chris Albright.

== Honors ==
- Twice Catholic League Most Valuable Player
- Southeastern Pennsylvania Soccer Hall of Fame (2014)
