= Klaus Krippendorff =

German-American cyberneticist (1932–2022)

- Born: March 21, 1932; Frankfurt, Germany
- Died: October 10, 2022 (aged 90); Philadelphia, Pennsylvania, US
- Known for: Krippendorff's alpha Content analysis Human-centered design

Academic background
- Education: Ulm School of Design; Princeton University; University of Illinois Urbana-Champaign
- Academic advisor: W. Ross Ashby

Academic work
- Institutions: University of Pennsylvania

Klaus Krippendorff (March 21, 1932 – October 10, 2022) was a communication scholar, social science methodologist, and cyberneticist. and was the Gregory Bateson professor for Cybernetics, Language, and Culture at the University of Pennsylvania's Annenberg School for Communication. He wrote an influential textbook on content analysis and is the creator of the widely used and eponymous measure of interrater reliability, Krippendorff's alpha. In 1984–1985, he served as the president of the International Communication Association, one of the two largest professional associations for scholars of communication.

== Overview ==
Krippendorff was born in 1932 in Frankfurt am Main in Germany. His father was an engineer at Junkers. In 1954, he graduated with an engineering degree from the State Engineering School Hannover (now Hanover University of Applied Sciences and Arts). In 1961, he graduated as diplom-designer from the Ulm School of Design (Hochschule für Gestaltung Ulm), Germany. And in 1967, he received his Ph.D. in communications from the pioneering Institute for Communication Research at the University of Illinois Urbana-Champaign.

Krippendorff started to work as an engineer and during the last year of his graduate study of design he was a research assistant at the Institute for Visual Perception at the Ulm School of Design. In 1961 he came to the United States with a two-year Ford International Fellowship, first to Princeton University but completing his second graduate education at the University of Illinois Urbana-Champaign. In 1964, he joined the Annenberg School for Communication at the University of Pennsylvania.

He was a member of the editorial boards of multiple academic journals, such as Communication and Information Science, Communication Research, Constructivist Foundations, Cybernetics & Human Knowing, International Journal of Cultural Studies and the Journal of Communication.

In 1971, he was awarded an honorary MA from the University of Pennsylvania. In the same year, he received an award for "On Generating Data in Communication Research" as the most outstanding contribution to The Journal of Communication, published in 1970. In 1979, he became a Fellow of the Netherlands Institute for Advanced Study in the Humanities and Social Sciences. He was elected a fellow of the American Association for the Advancement of Science (AAAS) in 1982, a fellow of the International Communication Association (ICA) in 1985, and a fellow of the Japanese Society for Science and Design Studies in 1998.

In 1998, graduate students named him as the teacher of the best doctoral course taken at the University of Pennsylvania. In 2000, he became the Gregory Bateson professor for Cybernetics, Language, and Culture at the Annenberg School for Communication. In 2001, he was awarded the Norbert Wiener Medal in Cybernetics in gold by the American Society for Cybernetics. Also in 2001, he received the ICA Fellows Book Award for his influential text Content Analysis, An Introduction to Its Methodology. In 2004, he received the Norbert Wiener/Hermann Schmidt Prize from the German Society for Cybernetics and the German Society for Pedagogy and Information at the University of Vienna.

In 2012, the Linnaeus University in Kalmar/Växjö, Sweden, awarded him the degree of Doctor of Philosophy honoris causa.

== Personal life ==
He was married to Bangladeshi freedom fighter Sultana Alam. His son-in-law was professional soccer player Brendan Sullivan who married their daughter Heike. Brendan and Heike have four sons, including Quinn and Cavan, who have both played for the United States national team. Their other sons, twins Ronan and Declan, represent Bangladesh at youth level due to their Bangladeshi heritage from their grandmother Alam.

Krippendorff died at the age of 90 in October 2022.

== Selected publications ==
Krippendorff has published widely on cybernetics and systems theory, methodology in the social sciences, human communication, conversation, and discourse. Among his major works are the following:

- 1967, An Examination of Content Analysis: A Proposal for a Framework and an Information Calculus for Message Analytic Situations, Ph.D. Dissertation, Urbana: University of Illinois, 400 pp.
- 1970, "Bivariate agreement coefficients for reliability of data", in E. F. Borgatta: Sociological Methodology. San Francisco: Jossey-Bass, 139–150.
- 1980, Content Analysis; An Introduction to its Methodology, Beverly Hills, CA: Sage, 188 pp. (Translated into Italian, Japanese, Spanish, and Hungarian)
- 1986, A Dictionary of Cybernetics, Norfolk, VA: The American Society for Cybernetics.
- 1986, Information Theory: Structural Models for Qualitative Data, Beverly Hills, CA: Sage Publications, 96 pp.
- 1989, Product Semantics. With R. Butter (Eds.) Design issues, 5.
- 1994, Design: A Discourse on Meaning; A Work Book, Philadelphia PA: University of the Arts.
- "Design in the Age of Information, A Report to the National Science Foundation (NSF)". 1997. p. 184.
- 2006, The Semantic Turn; A New Foundation for Design, New York: Taylor & Francis CRC, 349 pp. (Translated into Japanese)
- 2009, The Content analysis Reader. With M. A. Bock (Eds.). Thousand Oaks, CA: Sage, 481 pp.
- 2009, On Communicating; Otherness, Meaning, and Information. F. Bermejo (Ed.). New York: Routledge, 372 pp.
- 2012, Content Analysis; An Introduction to its Methodology, 3rd Edition, Thousand Oaks, CA: Sage, 441 pp.
- 2013, Die Semantische Wende. Eine neue Grundlage für Design. Edited by R. Michel, Birkhäuser De Gruyter

== See also ==
- Krippendorff's alpha
- Content analysis
- Satisficing
- Social entropy
- The Semantic Turn
