= The Semantic Turn =

The semantic turn refers to a paradigm shift in the design of artifacts – industrial, graphic, informational, architectural, and social – from an emphasis on how artifacts ought to function to what they mean to those affected by them – semantics being a concern for meaning. It provides a new foundation for professional design, a detailed design discourse, codifications of proven methods, compelling scientific justifications of its products, and a clear identity for professional designers working within a network of their stakeholders.

The semantic turn suggests a distinction between the technical and user-irrelevant working of artifacts and the human interactions with artifacts, individually, socially, and culturally. Attending to the technical dimension of artifacts, for example, by applied scientists, mechanical or electronic engineers, and experts in economics, production, and marketing, is called technology-centered design. It addresses its subject matter in terms that ordinary users may not understand and applies design criteria users of technology do not care about. Attending to the meanings that users bring to their artifacts, how they use them and talk about them and among various stakeholders, is the domain of human-centered design. For ordinary users, the makeup and technical functioning of artifacts is mere background of what really matters to them.

A prime example for this distinction is the design of personal computers. For most people, the operations inside a computer are incomprehensible, but far from troubling because computers are designed to be experienced primarily through their interfaces. Human-computer interfaces consist of interactively rearrangeable icons, texts, and controls that users can understand in everyday terms and manipulate towards desirable ends. The design of intelligent artifacts suggests that the old adage of “form follows function” is no longer valid – except for the simplest of tools. The semantic turn suggests that human-centered designers’ unique expertise resides in the design of human interfaces with artifacts that are meaningful, easy to use, even enjoyable to experience, be it simple kitchen implements, public service systems, architectural spaces, or information campaigns. Although an automobile should obviously function as a means of transportation, human-centered designers emphasize the experiences of driving, ease of operation, feeling of safety, including the social meanings of driving a particular automobile. As artifacts have to work within many dimensions, human-centered designers must have a sense of and be able to work with all relevant stakeholders addressing different dimensions of the artifact.

== The Semantic Turn: a book and its themes ==
The Semantic Turn is also the title of a book by Klaus Krippendorff, Professor of Communication at the University of Pennsylvania, cybernetician, degreed designer, and researcher who has published much to advance the science for design. The subtitle of the book, A new Foundation for Design, suggests a redesign of design practices in a human-centered design culture. Krippendorff takes an encompassing view of design, centering it on the meanings that artifacts acquire and what is or should be designers' primary concern.

The Semantic Turn: a new foundation for design
- Author: Klaus Krippendorff
- Language: English
- Subject: Design Science
- Publisher: Taylor & Francis, CRC Press
- Publication date: 2006
- Publication place: United States
- Pages: 349
- ISBN: 0-415-32220-0

The Semantic Turn represents an evolution from "Product Semantics" by Krippendorff and Butter, which was defined as "A systematic inquiry into how people attribute meanings to artifacts and interact with them accordingly" and "a vocabulary and methodology for designing artifacts in view of the meanings they could acquire for their users and the communities of their stakeholders". While retaining the emphasis on meaning and on the importance of both theory and practice, The Semantic Turn extends the concerns of designers first to the new challenges of design, including the design of ever more intangible artifacts such as services, identities, interfaces, multi-user systems, projects and discourses; and second, to consider the meaning of artifacts in use, in language, in the whole life cycle of the artifact, and in an ecology of artifacts.

=== Design ===
For Krippendorff, design "brings forth what would not come naturally (...); proposes realizable artifacts to others (...) must support the lives of ideally large communities (...) and must make sense to most, ideally to all who have a stake on them". Design thus is intimatelly involved with the meaning that stakeholders attribute to artifacts. Designers "consider possible futures (...) evaluate their desirability (...) and create and work out realistic paths from the present towards desirable futures, and propose them to those that can bring a design to fruition". Acknowledging that all design serves others, The Semantic Turn does not treat THE user as statistical fiction, but as knowledgeable stakeholders and necessary partners in human-centered design processes.

=== Predecessors of human-centeredness ===
Krippendorff quotes the Greek philosopher Protagoras who is believed to have been the first to express human-centeredness in words by saying that "Man is the measure of all things, of things that are (...) and of things that are not (...)." Krippendorff goes on to cite the color theory of J. W. von Goethe who exposed Isaac Newton's spectral theory of colors as epistemologically flawed by pointing out that color is the product of the human eye. Color does not exist without it. Krippendorff refers to the Italian philosopher G. Vico for opposing R. Descartes by claiming we humans know what we have constructed, made up, cognitively, materially, or socially, to the biologists J. Uexküll for his species-specific theory of meaning and H. Maturana and F. Varela for developing a biological foundation of cognition, to the psychologist J. J. Gibson for his conception of affordance, which acknowledges that our environment does not account for our perception, it merely affords our sensory-motor coordinations or it does not; and to the anthropological linguist B. L. Whorf for his recognition that our perceptions are correlated with language, its grammar and vocabulary. Most important, Krippendorff allies himself with L. Wittgenstein's definition of meaning as use, culminating in the axiom that Humans do not see and act on the physical qualities of things, but on what they mean to them.

=== Meaning ===
Attributing meaning to something follows from sensing it, and is a prelude to action. " One always acts according to the meaning of whatever one faces " and the consequences of these actions in turn become part of the meanings of what one interacts with. Meanings are always someone's construction and depend on context and culture. The same artifact may invoke different meanings at different times, in different contexts of use, and for different people. To design artifacts for use by others calls on designers to understand the understanding of others, a second order understanding that is fundamentally unlike the understanding of physical things. Since meanings cannot be observed directly, designers need to carefully observe the actions that imply certain meanings; involve themselves in dialog with their stakeholders; and invite them to participate in the design process.

=== Meaning of artifacts in use ===
People acquire the meanings of artifacts by their interfacing with them, where meanings become anticipated usabilities. Krippendorff does not limit the concept of interfaces to human computer interactions, however. For him, the concept applies to any artifact one faces. To users, artifacts are perceived as affordances, as the kind of interactions they enable or prohibit. Thus scissors and coffee cups are experienced as interfaces, just as personal computers are. Their physical or computational makeup become background phenomena to use. The meaning of an artifact in use is then " the range of imaginable senses and actions that users have reasons to expect" . Ideal interfaces are self-evident and " intrinsically motivating interactions between users and their artifacts" .

Drawing on Heidegger's explorations of the human use of technology, Krippendorff argues that all artifacts must be designed to afford three stages of use: initial recognition, intermediate exploration, and ideally, unproblematic reliance. The latter is achieved when the artifact is so incorporated into the user's world that it becomes hardly noticed, is taken for granted while looking through it to what is to be accomplished. Recognition involves users' categorizations, how close the artifact is to the ideal type of its kind. Exploration is facilitated by informatives such as state indicators, progress reports, confirmations of actions and readiness, alarm signals, close correlations between actions and their expected effects, maps of possibilities, instructions, error messages, and multi-sensory feedback. Users' intrinsic motivation arises from reliance, the seemingly effortless, unproblematic yet skillful engagement with artifacts free of disruptions. A well designed interface enables unambiguous recognition, effective exploration, and leads to enjoyable reliance. To accomplish these transitions, human-centered designers need to involve second-order understanding of users' cognitive models, cultural habits, and competencies.

Typically, users approach their artifacts with very different competencies. The Semantic Turn offers the possibility of accommodating these differences by allowing the design of several semantic layers. For example, contemporary Xerox machines exhibit one layer for making copies, another for clearing paper jams, a third for replacing defective parts by trained service personnel, and a fourth is reserved for the factory repair of replaced components.

=== Meaning of artifacts in language ===
"The fate of all artifacts is decided in language" , says Krippendorff. Indeed, designers must pay attention to the narratives in which an artifact appears as soon as it enters the conversations among stakeholders, bystanders, critics, and users, to the names that categorize the artifact as being of one kind or another, and to the adjectives that direct perception to particular qualities (is it a fast car? a clumsy cell phone? a high class dress?). Such characterizations can make or break an artifact and designers cannot ignore how people talk about them. Krippendorff proposes that artifacts should be designed so that their interfaces are [easily] narratable and fit into social or communicational relationships.

The character of an artifact – the set of adjectives deemed appropriate to it – can be assessed by means of semantic differential scales – seven point scales between polar opposite attributes such as elegant––––graceless; by categorizing free associations elicited from users, whether as first impressions or after extended use; by examining the content of stories people tell about the artifacts for implied judgments; or by pair comparisons of similar artifacts. Such methods give human-centered designers ways to quantify meanings, to work towards defined design criteria, including pursuing quantifiable aesthetic objectives, and justify a design to potential stakeholders.

Language permeates all of human life, including with artifacts. This applies not only to the users of artifacts but also to their designers. The narratives that evolve within design teams determine the direction a design is taking, and might end up convincing stakeholders to go along with a design project or oppose it, well before it is built, and influence designers in turn. What we know of current artifacts, ancient ones, outdated ones, antiques or museum pieces come to us in the form of stories. Designers need to analyse them for, as Krippendorff asserts, " The meanings that artifacts acquire in use are largely framed in language".

=== Meaning in the lives of artifacts ===
Here, Krippendorff invites designers to consider artifacts in their whole life cycle. In the case of industrial products, the life cycle might start with an initial idea, then followed by design, engineering, production, sales, use, storage, maintenance and finally retirement, as recycled or as waste. Well, not so "finally;" designers may learn much about a product's performance, unintended uses, unexpected problems, and resulting social consequences, which can serve to improve the design of the next generation of that product – design never ends. In each phase of the life cycle of an artifact, that artifact will have to support diverse but subjectively meaningful interfaces for different communities of stakeholders. In such stakeholder networks, artifacts need to proceed from one to the next: " no artifact can be realized within a culture without being meaningful to those who can move it through its various definitions" .

=== Meaning in an ecology of artifacts ===
Dictionaries tend to define ecology as multi-species interaction in a common environment, the species being animals and plants. Humans, however, have created a perhaps greater diversity of species of artifacts than has nature. Krippendorff observes that species of artifacts too are born, grow in size and number, diversify into sub-species, associate with other species, adapt to each other and to their human environment, and either reproduce, evolve, or disappear – just as in nature. Species of artifacts may compete, cooperate or be parasitic on other artifacts. For an example of the latter, consider spam, which thrives in the email ecosystem and could not exist outside it. Whereas species of animals and plants interact with one another in their own terms, species of artifacts are brought into interaction through human agency. People arrange artifacts, like the furniture at home; connect them into networks, like computes in the internet; form large cultural cooperatives, like hospitals full of medical equipment, drugs, and treatments; retire one species in favor of another, like typewriters gave way to personal computers; or change their ecological meanings, like horses, originally used for work and transportation, found an ecological niche in sports.

In an ecology of artifacts, the meaning of one consists of the possible interactions with other artifacts: cooperation, competition (substitution), domination or submission, leading technological development, like computers do right now, supporting the leaders, like the gadgets found in computer stores. Similarly, roads and gas stations follow the development of automobiles and participate in a very large cultural complex, including the design of cities and the distribution of work, and affect nature through depletion of resources, creating waste and CO_{2} emissions. Clearly, " designers who can handle the ecological meaning of their proposals have a better chance of keeping their designs alive" .

== Towards a science for design ==
In 1969, Nobel laureate Herbert Simon called for a science of the artificial. Natural scientists, he argued, are concerned with what exists, whereas designers are concerned with what should be and how to achieve it. His conception of design was shaped by rational decision theory and early conceptions of computational logic, hence limited largely to technology-centered design. Krippendorff added the following contrasts to Simon's:

- The natural sciences limit themselves to theorizing past regularities from existing data. They do not see scientists as change agents. Any science for design must concern itself with how designers can change existing regularities, overcome contingencies that cause recurring problems, and make a difference in the lives of present stakeholders or future communities. Designers do not produce theories but propose unprecedented artifacts, new practices, and narratives that must be realized in a network of stakeholders, which are actors in their own interest. The science for design cannot be about design or of design, which are pursued from outside the design community. It must provide practical and intellectual support of design by being for or in the service of design activity. In support of change that does not come naturally, it must also provide the conceptualizations needed to hold designers accountable for how their proposals affect future contingencies.
- The natural sciences privilege causal explanations, which rule out that their objects can understand how they are conceptualized, theorized, and studied. A science for human-centered design privileges the meanings (conceptions, explanations, and motivations) that knowledgeable users and stakeholders of a design can bring to it. It entails a reflexive kind of understanding unfamiliar in the natural sciences.
- As detached observers of their objects, natural scientists can afford to celebrate abstract and general theories. Designers, by contrast, must be concerned with all necessary details of their design. No technology works in the abstract. Even social artifacts need to be understood and enacted by their constituents. A design is always a proposal to other stakeholders who may contribute to a design or oppose its realization. Theories in the natural sciences do not affect what they theorize, but designs must enroll others into what they are proposing, treat them as intelligent agents, or will not come to fruition.
- In the natural sciences, research consists of gathering date or objective facts in support of theories about these data. Predictive theories assume the status quo (the continuation) of the phenomena they theorize. In the science for design, research means searching for previously unrecognized variables and proposing realistic paths into desirable futures. Design, to the extent it is innovative, may well break with past theories, overcome popular convictions, and challenge stubborn beliefs in a history-determined future. Fundamentally, past observations can never prove the validity of truly innovative designs.

A science for design makes three contributions to design:

=== Design research ===
Generally, research is any inquiry that generates communicable knowledge. Human-centered design research typically involves

- Eliciting and analyzing the narratives of problematic uses of artifacts and desirable futures, which motivate or inspire a community of potential users and stakeholders to consider changes in their lives.
- Searching for and evaluating examples of common, understandable, and attractive practices, especially from empirical domains other than the intended design, in view of their ability to serve as metaphors for new but immediately recognizable and meaningful interfaces.
- Exploring new technologies and materials that could support or improve current and future uses of the artifacts under consideration.
- Testing and evaluating alternative designs – recombinations and transformations of available technologies, possible interfaces, and social and ecological consequences – usually in terms relevant to present stakeholders and in lieu of future users.
- Inquiring into how a design survives in the ecology of artifacts, what lessons can be learned for future design activities, so called post-design research.

=== Design methods ===
Human-centered design methods may aim at:

- Systematic expansions of a design space – the possibilities in which a design can take place. This space should embrace and go beyond user and stakeholder expectations, especially including the (apparently) unthinkable. Such methods range from the computer generation of alternatives (combinatorics) to the use of language games during which novel ideas are created, for example by brainstorming.
- Focused involvement of users and stakeholders in the design process (in reducing the design space to realistic proposals for meaningful artifacts). There are three known ways:
  - Acquiring an understanding of users’ and stakeholders’ understanding, so-called second-order understanding, for instance by ethnographic research or focus groups, and making design decisions dependent on that understanding
  - Involving users and stakeholders in design decisions, for example, participatory design
  - Delegating design by designing artifacts that either adapt themselves to their users’ and stakeholders’ worlds or can be redesigned by them, in personal computers, for example.
- Formalizing successful design practices into reproducible aids that can improve future design practices, both computationally, for example, computer aided design, collaborative software, and rapid prototyping, and prescriptively. Krippendorff describes five prescriptive methods:
  - (Re)designing the characters of artifacts
  - Designing interfaces for artifacts in view of their usability and meanings in use
  - Designing novel artifacts, including services and social practices, from sensible narratives and metaphors
  - Designing design strategies
  - Designing dialogical (collaborative) methodologies to involve others in a design process.
- Elaborating and refining the design discourse in order to
  - Improve the reproducibility of knowledge about the design process, by generating retrievable records of past accounts of design processes and publishing pertinent findings
  - Make the collaboration among designers as well as in interdisciplinary teams more efficient
  - Inform pertinent design education
  - Enhance the ability to ask fruitful research questions for which design research may provide conclusive answers
  - Increase and maintain the reputation of professional design, especially in order for designers to play important roles within the network of its stakeholders. This means applying the science for design to itself.

=== Validations of semantic claims ===
In a science for design, validation consists of generating compelling justifications for the claims that designers must make regarding the meaning, virtue, potential reality, costs and benefits of their design for particular communities. Inasmuch as any design can prove itself only in the future, post factum, and with the collaboration of others, human-centered design is justifiable only by means of plausible arguments Issue-Based Information System that motivate its stakeholders to realize or use that design. The science for design, always concerned with not yet observable contingencies, cannot provide the simple truth claims of the kind that natural scientist aspire to for their theories. But it can provide several other human-centered ways to back the claims designers need to make:

- Convincing demonstrations and expositions of a design in various contexts of use
- Statistical experiments with prototypes, models or visualizations involving users’ ability to make sense of, find appropriate meanings for, and handle a proposed artifact
- Appeals to trusted theories or principles of how meanings of artifacts are acquired in use, can be communicated through various channels, or emerge in a diversity of social situations, including in an ecology of other artifacts
- Accounts of the systematic application of established design methods that reduced the initial design space to the alternatives being proposed
- Affirmed commitments by relevant stakeholders to realize the design.

== Reception of "product semantics" and The Semantic Turn ==
Since its coinage in 1984, the use of “product semantics” has mushroomed. In 2009, a Google search identified over 18,000 documents referring to it. However, it has been critiqued by advocates of a more critical approach to design as overly simplistic.

The semantics of artifacts has become of central importance in courses taught at leading design departments of many universities all over the world, among them at the Arizona State University; the Cranbrook Academy of Arts; The Ohio State University; the Savannah College of Art and Design; the University of the Arts in Philadelphia, USA; the Hochschule fűr Gestaltung Offenbach in Germany; the Hongik University in Seoul, Korea; the Indian Institute of Technology in Mumbai; the Musashino Art University in Tokyo, Japan; the National Taiwan University of Science and Technology; the University of Art and Design in Helsinki, Finland; and more. It has also permeated other disciplines, notably ergonomics, marketing, cognitive engineering.

Reviews can be found by writers on design theory, design history, corporate strategy, national design policy, design science studies, participatory design, interaction design, human-computer interaction, and cybernetics.

The Semantic Turn has been translated into Japanese and into German.

== Additional references ==
- Archer, Bruce (1995). The Nature of Research. Co-design 2, pp. 6–13, , accessed 2009.10.18.
- Bonsiepe, Gui (1996), Interface; Design neu begreifen. Mannheim, Germany: Bollmann Verlag.
- Krippendorff, Klaus (2006). The Semantic Turn; A New Foundation for Design. Boca Raton, London, New York: Taylor&Francis, CRC Press.
- Krippendorff, Klaus; et al., eds. (1997). Design in the Age of Information; A Report to the National Science Foundation (NSF). Raleigh, NC: Design Research Laboratory, North Carolina State University.
- Krippendorff, Klaus & Butter, Reinhart (Eds.) (1989). Product Semantics. Design Issues 5, 2.
- Norman, Donald, A. (2002). The Design of Everyday Things. New York: Basic Books.
- Norman, Donald, A. (2005). Emotional Design. New York: Basic Books.
- Simon, Herbert A. (1969/2001). The Sciences of the Artificial, 3rd Edition. Cambridge, MA: MIT Press.
- Steffen, Dagmar (2000). Design als Produktsprache. Frankfurt/Main: Verlag form.
- Tahkokallio, Päivi & Vihma, Susann (Eds.) (1995). Design – Pleasure or Responsibility? Helsinki: University of Art and Design.
- Väkevä, Seppo (Ed.) (1990). Product Semantics '89. Helsinki: University of Art and Design.
- Vihma, Susann (Ed.) (1990). Semantic Visions in Design. Helsinki: University of Art and Design.
