= The 2030 °Challenge =

Initiative to make new buildings carbon-neutral

The 2030 Challenge is an initiative by Edward Mazria and Architecture 2030 to make all new buildings and renovations carbon-neutral by the year 2030 to avoid the catastrophic effects of climate change caused by the building sector. Buildings, construction, and operational activities generate nearly 40% of annual Greenhouse Gas (GHG) emissions, consequently, there is a larger scope to stabilize and reverse emissions in this sector, in order to avoid increased global warming to reach a tipping point. Therefore, instead of seeing it as a trying issue, Architecture 2030, a non-profit organization, strives to beat the woes of climate change by implementing energy-efficient planning and design.

== Targets defined ==
The following are the targets set by The 2030 Challenge:

- All new buildings, developments and major renovations be designed to meet a fossil fuel, greenhouse gas (GHG) emitting, energy consumption performance standard of 70% of the regional (or country) average for that building type.
- At a minimum, an amount of existing building area equal to that of new construction be renovated annually to meet a fossil fuel, greenhouse gas (GHG) emitting, energy consumption performance standard of 70% of the regional (or country) average for that building type.
- The fossil fuel reduction standard for all new buildings be increased to:

60% in 2010
70% in 2015
80% in 2020
90% in 2025
Carbon-neutral by 2030 (zero fossil fuel, GHG emitting energy to operate).

== History ==
Edward Mazria, a renowned architect, author, researcher and educator brings to light the contribution of building sector, to the on-going fight against climate change, after his analysis of U.S. energy information data in 2002. The results of the 2002 study conducted by Edward Marzria and his firm were appalling, where buildings came out as dominant source of emissions, accounting for 40% of U.S. Energy use. In response to this discovery, Edward Mazria as a part of his practice in Santa Fe, started and financed a research organization, Architecture 2030, which aimed at reducing the greenhouse gas emissions from the built-environment. Later, in 2006 he incorporated Architecture 2030 as a non-profit organization and issued the 2030 Challenge.

== Adopters ==
American Institute of Architects (AIA), is one of the first major industry group to embrace the 2030 Challenge. In addition to this, it launched the AIA 2030 Commitment to support the 2030 Challenge and track the progress of carbon-neutral future. Besides the American Institute of Architects, the challenge has been adopted by other professional organizations like the U.S. Green Building Council; National Governors Association; American Society of Heating, Refrigerating and Air-Conditioning Engineers (ASHRAE); and the Union Internationale des Architectes, among many others, as well as 41 percent of U.S. architecture firms. The 2007 Energy Independence and Security Act required all new federal buildings to meet the energy performance standards set forth in the 2030 Challenge. The city of Seattle has created the Seattle 2030 District, an interdisciplinary public-private collaborative working to create high-performance building district downtown to meet the 2030 challenge targets district wide. In Canada, the Royal Architectural Institute of Canada, the Ontario Association of Architects and cities such as Vancouver have also adopted the Challenge targets.

== Approach ==
In order to meet the targets set by the 2030 challenge, building's modeled energy performance is compared to the energy use of a median performing building, also known as Baseline Energy Use Intensity (EUI). Formerly, Architecture 2030 organization relied on the U.S. Environmental Protection Agency's (EPA) Target Finder Tool to identify energy information from the database, standardizing for building typology, climate, size, use etc. Target Finder, in turn, accessed energy use data set from Commercial Buildings energy Consumption Survey (CBECS) to set the target EUI. In respond to EPA's latest news on updating its tools from 2003 CBECS to 2012, stemming to a change in all the benchmark EUIs, Architecture 2030 organization introduced their new Zero Tool, which keeps the designers and owners moving from their baselines as those of CBECS 2012. Architecture 2030's Zero Tool expands on the Target Finder's features, offering a graphic display of baselines, targets, and existing building performance, allowing users to compare data normalized by climate, building size, occupancy and schedule. These target EUIs are achieved by using a set of energy-efficient design strategies which includes low cost or no cost passive design and use of renewable sources for on-site construction activities. A list of key ideas integrating all the principles, required to create low-carbon and adaptable built-environments worldwide can be found in the 2030 Palette. In addition to this guide, Architecture 2030 also provides an educational program; AIA+2030 Online Series, with a goal to provide design professionals high-performance building knowledge necessary to meet the 2030 Challenge targets.

== AIA 2030 Commitment ==
The mission of AIA 2030 Commitment is to provide a holistic, data-driven platform for all the participating architecture, engineering and consultancy firms of 2030 Challenge and report their progress on meeting the 2030 targets. By signing the commitment, architecture firms agree to:

- Create a Sustainable action plan for the entire firm.
- Report the annual predicted energy use of every new construction, major renovation and interior-only project in their design portfolio.

In 2014, it began a data collection effort called Design Data Exchange to record the progress of firms that had joined the 2030 Commitment. In 2017, participating firms reported 560 projects that met challenge targets, with nearly a quarter of those already net zero.

== 2030 Palette ==
The 2030 Palette is a free online tool, serving as a guide for all sustainable design principles, strategies and resources needed to create carbon-neutral and resilient built environments, at all scales- from regional and city planning to building details.

== AIA+2030 Series ==
The AIA+2030 series is another initiative aiming to increase the uptake of the 2030 commitment. Originally created by AIA Seattle, this educational program is sponsored by Autodesk and delivered through AIAU, the AIA's online educational portal.

== Other considerations ==
In the face of climate change, the 2030 Challenge largely incorporates technical architectural solutions to achieve its carbon neutral goals.

In the article "Buildings don’t use energy: people do", author Kathryn B.Janda from Environmental Change Institute of Oxford University talks about how even though the architectural solutions offered by the 2030 challenge are indispensable, they are not enough to fight the negative environmental effects of the building sector. There is a need of a platform or profession, that spreads the knowledge or awareness of building use beyond the circle of architects, designers, engineers and other building science professionals to the general public. Even with the best passive design strategies and on-site renewable resources, a poorly operated building can prove to be a hindrance in mitigating climate change. For example, ‘green buildings’, when occupied by professional service companies, are often being used by employees over longer daytime occupancy schedules with more weekend working; thus, exceeding energy targets anticipated during their design. The increasing intensity of energy use with a reduction in carbon targets; also referred to as divergence problem, could only be solved by integrating user involvement in the building performance. It can be concluded that the only way to realize a carbon-neutral future is to build on incremental change in each successive phase.

== See also ==
- Zero-Energy Buildings
- Sustainable Design
- Carbon Offset
- Low Carbon Economy
