= Dan Rockhill =

American architect

Dan Rockhill is the principal of the Architecture firm Rockhill and Associates and is the JL Constant Distinguished Professor of Architecture at the University of Kansas School of Architecture, Design, and Planning. He is the executive director of the graduate design building program Studio 804 and is responsible for several contemporary residential designs in and around Lawrence, Kansas and the Kansas City Metropolitan Area. Rockhill graduated with a Bachelor of Architecture degree from Notre Dame in 1970 and a Master of Architecture degree from SUNY in 1976.
