= Silverstone (plastic) =

Type of non-stick plastic coating

SilverStone is a non-stick plastic coating made by DuPont. Released in 1976, this three-coat (primer/midcoat/topcoat) fluoropolymer system formulated with PTFE and PFA produces a more durable finish than Teflon coating.

As of 1980 Dupont required that the pans carrying the brand be a heavier weight than others on the market. After the coating was applied the cookware was subsequently "baked" in a 700-800 degree oven to affix the coating.

The process for creating Silverstone cookware begins by sandblasting the products which creates an uneven surface that encourages adherence. Then a primer layer of Teflon is sprayed on and after it is baked at high heat to "a secure mechanical grip." Gizmodo reported in 2014 that one or two more additional layers were applied after the initial layer.
