= Studio 804 =

Architecture studio at the University of Kansas

- The logo of Studio 804
- Founder: Professor Dan Rockhill
- Founded at: University of Kansas
- Type: Graduate level architecture design Studio
- Coordinates: 38.9234°N 94.7292°W
- Website: www.studio804.com

Studio 804 is a graduate level architecture design studio developed by Professor Dan Rockhill at the University of Kansas. The course is distinguished from typical architecture studios in that it is a design-build studio in which the students work collaboratively to not only design a project but to actually construct it. Studio 804 is a two-semester, 9 month commitment. During the first semester students work collectively to determine a client for the next project. Once a client is established, students usually have 2 months to design the project beginning with the Schematic Design phase and seeing it through to Construction Documents. The second semester usually begins in early January to start off the building process. One home is built by Studio 804 annually.

Students are responsible for acquiring all material for the project, and maintaining the budget. The students also take part in constructing the entire project themselves with the help of subs for mechanical/electrical/ and plumbing work. Once certain aspects of the project are completed, code officials step in to inspect for proper construction methods. Contrary to earlier contemporary prefabricated designs which allow for easier, cheaper constructions that can be assembled in a shorted time frame that typical housing projects, the studio has leaned toward two commercial projects the past two years.

Each year roughly 22 students enroll in the program with hopes of receiving their Masters and a prestigious building to add to their résumé.

The mission of the studio is very similar to that of the famous Rural Studio pioneered by Samuel Mockbee at Auburn University.

== Galileo's Pavilion ==
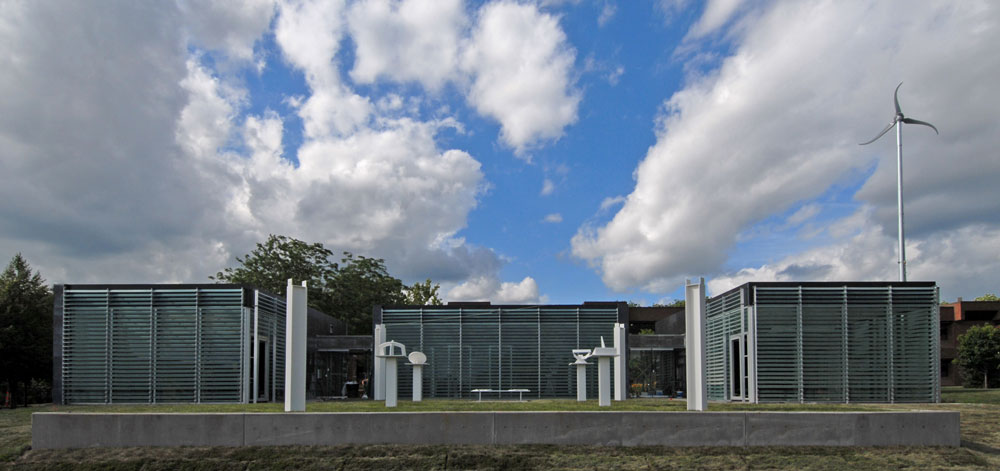
Galileo's Pavilion

The latest Studio 804 project, The Galileo's Pavilion located on the Johnson County Community College campus in Overland Park, KS, is expected to be the programs fifth consecutive LEED certified building under Dan Rockhill in the state of Kansas. The Pavilion has a footprint of 3,300 square feet and will be the home of two 900 square feet classroom spaces. The building is equipped with a tremendous amount of sustainable features that include 43 photovoltaic panels on the roof, a wind turbine, an underground rainwater cistern, low flow lavatories and water closets, a green roof, and a continuous interior green wall that is supplemented by the rain collected from the roof.
