= Smart Design =

American industrial design company

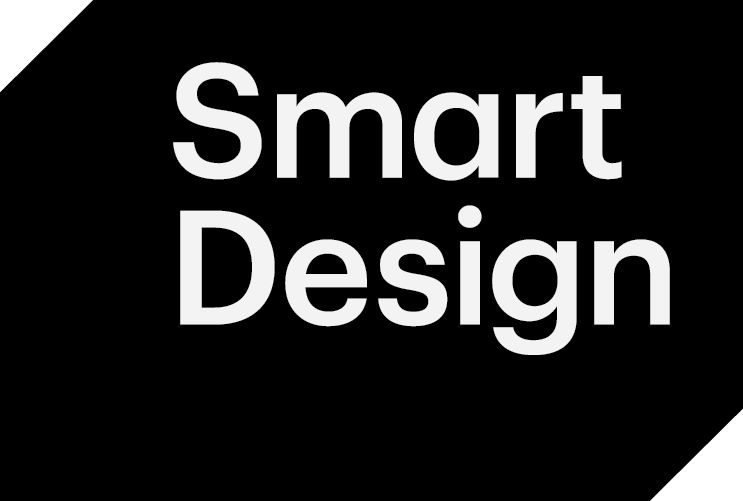
- Type: Private
- Industry: Design firm, industrial design, interaction design, branding
- Founded: 1980; 46 years ago
- Founder: Davin Stowell
- Headquarters: New York City, United States
- Area served: Worldwide
- Key people: Davin Stowell, Richard Whitehall, Tucker Fort
- Website: smartdesignworldwide.com

Smart Design is a design consultancy based in New York City. Smart was founded in 1980 by industrial designers Davin Stowell, Tom Dair, Tucker Viemeister, and Tamara Thomsen, with Stowell as CEO. The firm has been a prominent presence in the design industry since the late 1980s, as design competency increasingly came to be seen as "key to industrial competitiveness".

In addition to its NYC headquarters, the company has at various times had offices in San Francisco, Barcelona, and London, and has worked with clients including HP, Johnson & Johnson, Gillette, BBVA, PepsiCo's Gatorade, and Pyrex. In 2012, the company worked with the City's Taxi and Limousine Commission to redesign NYC's iconic taxis as part of a collaboration with Nissan titled the Taxi of Tomorrow, and also developed the now ubiquitous logo and decals found on the city's yellow taxis and green boro taxis.

The firm is best known for its design of the original Oxo Good Grips line in 1989, and longstanding relationship with Oxo, which continues to this day. The Good Grips potato peeler, the first in what would become a large range, was designed with OXO founder Sam Faber's wife Betsy in mind, who suffered from Arthritis. The Good Grips range of products is often cited as an archetypal example of an approach to industrial design involving user-centered prototyping and iteration, and where considerations of human factors and accessibility make a product better for all users. The Good Grips line is represented in the permanent collections of the Cooper Hewitt Smithsonian Design Museum and New York's Museum of Modern Art.

In 2010, the company won the National Design Award for product design from the Smithsonian's Cooper Hewitt.

Smart Design helped popularize design thinking alongside other major design firms. Smart design helped shift design thinking into the mainstream business world by facilitating co-creation and participatory design. Design thinking is commonly visualized as an iterative series of five major stages. While the stages are simple enough, the adaptive expertise required to choose the right inflection points and appropriate next stage is a high-order intellectual activity that requires practice and is learnable. Design thinking asserts that individuals and teams have the ability to build their innovative capacity through various tools and methods, no matter their predispositions to creativity and innovation. The contexts of design thinking attempt to alter the design process towards more innovative ideas. Design thinking is too often misconstrued as an impervious remedy for corporate ill. But Smart design believes that to realize the full value of design, we need to break out of the rigid status quo and embrace rapid, iterative cycles.
