= OXO (kitchen utensils brand) =

Manufacturer of kitchen utensils, office supplies, and housewares

- Type: Subsidiary
- Industry: Consumer products
- Founded: 1990; 36 years ago
- Founder: Sam Farber; John Farber
- Headquarters: New York City, United States
- Area served: Worldwide
- Products: Good Grips, Soft Works, Steel, Candela, Touchables
- Number of employees: 97 (headquarters); 127 (worldwide)
- Parent: Helen of Troy Limited
- Website: www.oxo.com

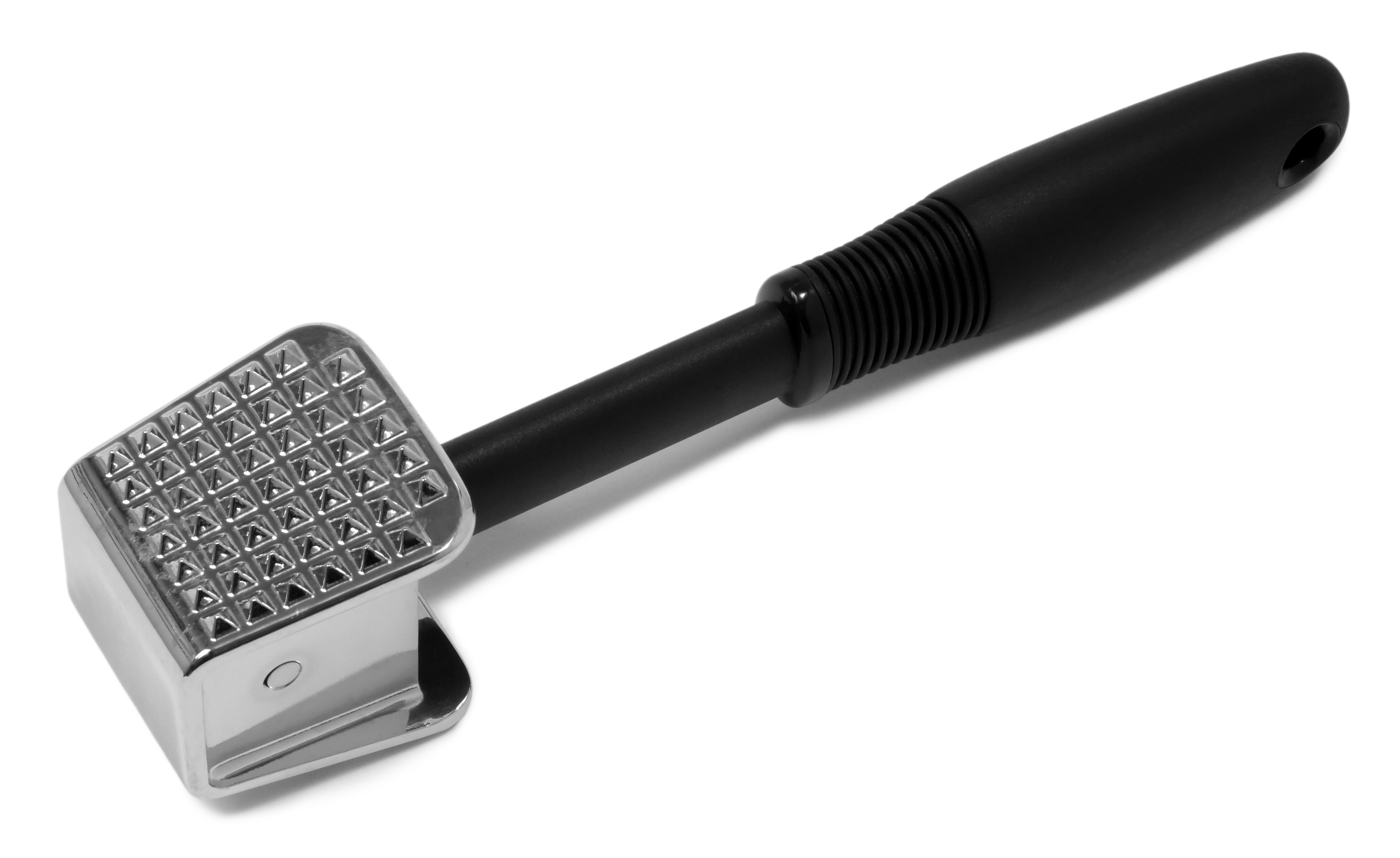
An OXO Good Grips meat tenderizer

OXO (/ˈɒksoʊ/ OKS-oh) is an American manufacturer of kitchen utensils, office supplies, and housewares, founded in 1990 and based in New York City.

OXO products are made in the USA and China. They provide a non-stick pro-Bakeware line that is completely made in the US.

== History ==
OXO was founded by Sam Farber, an entrepreneur in the housewares industry, and his son, John Farber. Sam Farber chose the name "OXO" as an ambigram that renders the three letters in "OXO" the same regardless of their orientation, either horizontal or vertically. Noticing that his wife, Betsy, who suffered from mild arthritis in her hands, was having difficulty gripping ordinary kitchen tools, he saw an opportunity to create more comfortable cooking tools that would benefit users. He worked with the design firm Smart Design to create the initial products in the line, including the Swivel Peeler, and OXO continued to collaborate with Smart for many years. The first group of 15 OXO Good Grips kitchen tools were introduced to the U.S. market at the Gourmet Products Show in San Francisco, in 1990.

Sam Farber sold OXO to General Housewares Corporation in 1992. General Housewares Corporation was acquired by World Kitchen LLC. in 2000. In June 2004, Helen of Troy Limited bought OXO housewares for US$273.2 million.
