= 2012 Columbus Crew season =

Columbus Crew
2012 season
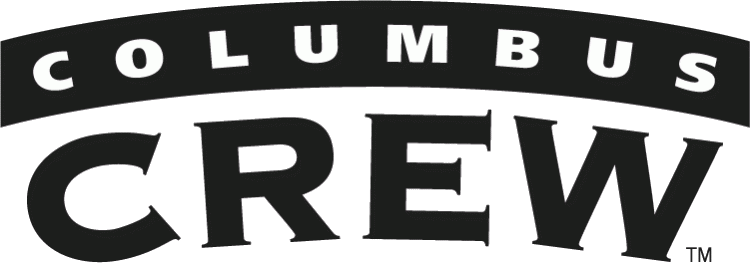
- Investor-operators: Clark Hunt; Dan Hunt; Lamar Hunt Jr. Sharron Hunt Munson; Ron Pizzuti and a group of local investors
- Head Coach: Robert Warzycha
- Stadium: Columbus Crew Stadium
- Major League Soccer: Conference: 6th Overall: 10th
- MLS Cup playoffs: Did not qualify
- U.S. Open Cup: Third round
- Top goalscorer: League: Eddie Gaven; Jairo Arrieta (9 each); All: Eddie Gaven; Jairo Arrieta (9 each)
- Highest home attendance: 19,674 (6/30 v. RSL)
- Lowest home attendance: 10,049 (8/22 v. TOR)
- Average home league attendance: 14,397 (71.5%)
- Biggest win: CLB 2–0 MON (3/24); SEA 0–2 CLB (5/23); CLB 2–0 RSL (6/30)
- Biggest defeat: CLB 1–4 NY (4/7)
Home colors	Away colors

The 2012 Columbus Crew season was the club's 17th season of existence and their 17th consecutive season in Major League Soccer, the top flight of soccer in the United States and Canada. The first match of the season was on March 10 against Colorado Rapids. It was the fourth season under head coach Robert Warzycha.

== Review ==
The Crew missed the playoffs in 2012 for the first time since 2007, marking a further step backwards from the height of 2008. The roster moves which took place leading into the season were ultimately unsuccessful, with both high-profile signings – Milovan Mirosevic and Olman Vargas – playing only a single season for the club.

The lackluster performance of Vargas and Mirosevic led the team to a series of midseason signings, which nearly salvaged the season. Costa Rican forward Jairo Arrieta joined the team in June, while Argentine midfielder Federico Higuain signed a Designated Player contract a month later. The tandem revitalized the Crew's offense, leading to a 4-game winning streak and thoughts of post-season glory. After this initial honeymoon, however, the team's performance declined; the team just missed out on a playoff berth.

After the season, coach Robert Warzycha began yet another rebuilding effort, jettisoning several veteran players including William Hesmer, Sebastian Miranda and Emilio Renteria.

The year's most significant event, however, had nothing to do with on-field performance. Rookie midfielder Kirk Urso collapsed and died on August 5 from a genetic heart defect (arrhythmogenic right ventricular cardiomyopathy), providing an emotional rallying cry for the remainder of the season and beyond.

== Roster ==
As of August 29, 2012.

Note: Flags indicate national team as defined under FIFA eligibility rules; some limited exceptions apply. Players may hold more than one non-FIFA nationality.

No.	Pos.	Nation	Player
1	GK	USA	William Hesmer
2	DF	USA	Rich Balchan
3	DF	USA	Josh Williams (SUP)
4	DF	USA	Carlos Mendes
5	DF	USA	Danny O'Rourke
6	MF	CMR	Tony Tchani
7	MF	VEN	Bernardo Añor (INT; SUP)
8	MF	TTO	Chris Birchall (INT)
9	FW	IRQ	Justin Meram
10	MF	CHI	Milovan Mirošević (INT)
11	MF	USA	Dilly Duka
12	MF	USA	Eddie Gaven
13	MF	USA	Ethan Finlay
14	DF	USA	Chad Marshall (captain)
16	DF	USA	Eric Gehrig (SUP)
17	FW	CRC	Olman Vargas (INT)

No.	Pos.	Nation	Player
18	FW	USA	Ben Speas (HGP; SUP)
19	FW	USA	Tom Heinemann (SUP)
20	FW	VEN	Emilio Rentería
21	DF	CHI	Sebastián Miranda (INT)
22	MF	USA	Cole Grossman (SUP)
25	FW	CRC	Jairo Arrieta (INT)
26	DF	TTO	Julius James
27	FW	USA	Aaron Horton (HGP; SUP)
28	GK	USA	Matt Lampson (HGP; SUP)
30	GK	USA	Andy Gruenebaum
32	DF	MNE	Nemanja Vuković (INT)
33	FW	ARG	Federico Higuaín (INT; DP)
34	FW	USA	Aaron Schoenfeld (SUP)
37	MF	TTO	Kevan George (SUP)

== Technical Staff ==
Position	Staff
President/General Manager	(United States) Mark McCullers
Technical Director	(United States) Brian Bliss
Head Coach	(Poland) Robert Warzycha
Assistant Coach	(Argentina) Ricardo Iribarren
Assistant Coach	(United States) Mike Lapper
Assistant Coach	(New Zealand) Duncan Oughton
Goalkeeper Coach	(United States) Scoop Stanisic
Strength/Fitness Coach	(United States) Brook Hamilton
Athletic Trainer	(United States) David Lagow
Assistant Trainer	(United States) Phil Watson
Director of Team Operations	(United States) Tucker Walther
Equipment Manager	(United States) Rusty Wummel

Source: []

== Non-competitive ==
=== Preseason ===
The Crew started preseason in Columbus and played games in Florida and South Carolina before returning to Ohio. The Crew brought in the following trialists during training camp: Javier Alvial, Lance Laing, Travis Wall, Silvio Spann, Nermin Crnkić, John Daniele, Kasali Casal, Nemanja Vuković and Stéphane Auvray.

Unsigned draft picks Aubrey Perry, Kevan George, Kirk Urso, Jamie Finch, Darren Amoo and Andrew Bulls also joined the team for preseason.

February 8 Friendly	Columbus Crew	1–2	Malmö FF	Bradenton, FL
11:00 AM EST	Renteria 1'	Report	Ranegie 24'; Durmaz 29'	Stadium: IMG Academy

February 11 Friendly	Columbus Crew	6–0	United States U-17	Bradenton, FL
10:00 AM EST	Gaven 8', 15'; Mirosevic 27' (pen.); Renteria 33'; Meram 51'; Vargas 57'	Report		Stadium: IMG Academy

February 11 Friendly	Columbus Crew	4–0	United States U-17	Bradenton, FL
12:00 PM EST	George 3'; Horton 21'; Heinemann 39', 53'	Report		Stadium: IMG Academy

February 15 Friendly	Seattle Sounders FC	2–0	Columbus Crew	Bradenton, FL
11:00 AM EST	Hurtado (yellow card) 10' (yellow-red card) 13'; Alonso (yellow card) 12'; Montero 54'; Gonzalez (yellow card) 68'; Sanyang (red card) 82'; Cato 114'	Report	Anor (yellow card) 29' (red card) 60'; Tchani (yellow card) 38'; Heinemann (yellow card) 118'	Stadium: IMG Academy
Note: Played in two 45-minute and one 30-minute periods

February 25 Carolina Challenge Cup	Charleston Battery	2–2	Columbus Crew	Charleston, SC
7:15 PM EST	Falvey (yellow card) 30'; Kelly 40'; Flatley (yellow card) 42'; Cuevas 89'	Report	Gaven 6'; Mendes (yellow card) 45'; Mirosevic 58'; Tchani (yellow card) 61'; Mendes (yellow card) 89' (red card)	Stadium: Blackbaud Stadium

February 27 Friendly	Charleston Cougars	0–2	Columbus Crew	Charleston, SC
		Report	Vargas 54'; Gehrig 71'	Stadium: Patriots Point Soccer Complex; Attendance: 5,676

February 29 Carolina Challenge Cup	Columbus Crew	0–1	Chicago Fire	Charleston, SC
5:00 PM EST	Tchani (yellow card) 73'	Report	Sanyang (yellow card) 38'; Segares (yellow card) 75'; Puppo 80'	Stadium: Blackbaud Stadium

March 3 Carolina Challenge Cup	D.C. United	Cancelled	Columbus Crew	Charleston, SC
5:00 PM EST				Stadium: Blackbaud Stadium
Note: Cancelled due to inclement weather.

=== Midseason ===
Jamie Finch and Blas Iribarren were guest players against West Virginia Mountaineers.

March 12 Friendly	Columbus Crew	2–2	Notre Dame Fighting Irish	Columbus, OH
11:00 AM EDT	Vargas 26', 63'	Report	Mishu 80'; Priede 84'	Stadium: Columbus Crew Stadium

March 17 Friendly	Columbus Crew	5–1	Michigan State Spartans	Columbus, OH
11:00 AM EDT	Mirošević 4', 54'; Vargas 33', 58'; Urso 59'	Report	Montague 85'	Stadium: Columbus Crew Stadium

March 17 Friendly	Columbus Crew	1–0	West Virginia Mountaineers	Columbus, OH
1:30 PM EDT	Horton 49'	Report		Stadium: Columbus Crew Stadium

May 1 Connor Senn Memorial Game	Ohio State Buckeyes	0–4	Columbus Crew	Columbus, OH
7:00 PM EDT		Report	Grossman 2', 27'; Añor 5'; Renteria 6'	Stadium: Jesse Owens Memorial Stadium; Attendance: 1,072
Note: Cancelled in the 31st minute due to inclement weather.

July 24 Friendly	Columbus Crew	2–1	Stoke City F.C.	Columbus, OH
7:30 PM EDT	Horton 71'; Speas 87'	Report	Walters 23'	Stadium: Columbus Crew Stadium; Attendance: 8,976

== Competitive ==
=== Overview ===
Competition	First match	Last match	Starting round	Final position	Record							
Competition	First match	Last match	Starting round	Final position	Pld	W	D	L	GF	GA	GD	Win %
Major League Soccer	March 10, 2012	October 28, 2012	Matchday 1	10th	34	15	7	12	44	44	+0	44.12
U.S. Open Cup	May 29, 2012	May 29, 2012	Third Round	Third Round	1	0	0	1	1	2	−1	0.00
Total					35	15	7	13	45	46	−1	42.86

Source: Competitions

=== MLS ===
==== Standings ====
===== Eastern Conference =====
Pos	Team	Pld	W	L	T	GF	GA	GD	Pts	Qualification
4	Chicago Fire	34	17	11	6	46	41	+5	57	Qualification for the knockout round
5	Houston Dynamo	34	14	9	11	48	41	+7	53	Qualification for the knockout round
6	Columbus Crew	34	15	12	7	44	44	0	52	
7	Montreal Impact	34	12	16	6	45	51	−6	42	
8	Philadelphia Union	34	10	18	6	37	45	−8	36	

Source: MLS

===== Overall table =====
Pos	Team	Pld	W	L	T	GF	GA	GD	Pts	
8	LA Galaxy (C)	34	16	12	6	59	47	+12	54	Qualification for the CONCACAF Champions League
9	Houston Dynamo	34	14	9	11	48	41	+7	53	Qualification for the CONCACAF Champions League
10	Columbus Crew	34	15	12	7	44	44	0	52	
11	Vancouver Whitecaps FC	34	11	13	10	35	41	−6	43	
12	Montreal Impact	34	12	16	6	45	51	−6	42	Qualification for the CONCACAF Champions League

Source: MLS
Rules for classification: 1) points; 2) head-to-head record; 3) goal difference; 4) number of goals scored
(C) MLS Cup champions

==== Results summary ====
Overall								Home						Away					
Pld	Pts	W	L	T	GF	GA	GD	W	L	T	GF	GA	GD	W	L	T	GF	GA	GD
34	52	15	12	7	44	44	0	11	3	3	28	21	+7	4	9	4	16	23	−7

Last updated: 28 October 2012
Source: Columbus Crew
Pld = Matches played; Pts = Points; W = Matches won; T = Matches tied; L = Matches lost; GF = Goals for; GA = Goals against; GD = Goal difference

==== Results by round ====
Round	1	2	3	4	5	6	7	8	9	10	11	12	13	14	15	16	17	18	19	20	21	22	23	24	25	26	27	28	29	30	31	32	33	34
Stadium	A	H	A	H	A	H	H	A	H	A	A	H	A	A	H	A	H	H	A	A	H	H	A	H	A	H	A	A	H	A	H	H	A	H
Result	L	W	W	L	L	T	L	T	W	T	W	W	T	L	W	L	L	W	W	L	T	T	W	W	W	W	L	L	W	L	W	T	L	W

Updated to match(es) played on October 28, 2012. Source: MLS
A = Away; H = Home; W = Win; L = Loss; T = Tie

==== Match results ====
March 10 1	Colorado Rapids	2–0	Columbus Crew	Commerce City, CO
7:00 PM EST	Moor 44'; Amarikwa 89'	Report	Mirošević (yellow card) 40'; Vargas (yellow card) 72'; Wynne (yellow card) 80'; Rentería (yellow card) 80'	Stadium: Dick's Sporting Goods Park; Attendance: 14,746; Referee: Hilario Grajeda; Assistant referees: Paul Scott; Bill Dittmar; Fourth official: Yader Reyes

March 24 2	Columbus Crew	2–0	Montreal Impact	Columbus, OH
4:00 PM EDT	Mirošević 30'; Vargas 66'; Urso (yellow card) 69'; Francis (yellow card) 85'	Report	Brovsky (red card) 19'; Nyassi (yellow card) 29'; Gardner (yellow card) 34'; Warner (yellow card) 52'	Stadium: Columbus Crew Stadium; Attendance: 18,197; Referee: Mark Geiger; Assistant referees: C.J. Morgante; Steve Taylor; Fourth official: Chris Penso

March 31 3	Toronto FC	0–1	Columbus Crew	Toronto, ON
2:00 PM EDT	de Guzman (yellow card) 74'	Report	Gaven (yellow card) 45'; Añor 56'; Schoenfeld (yellow card) 86'	Stadium: BMO Field; Attendance: 18,944; Referee: Geoff Gamble; Assistant referees: Eric Proctor; Kevin Duliba; Fourth official: Silviu Petrescu

April 7 4	Columbus Crew	1–4	New York Red Bulls	Columbus, OH
3:00 PM EDT	Añor (yellow card) 53'; Marshall 89'	Report	Cooper 3', 13'; Henry 40', 90'; Keel (yellow card) 60'	Stadium: Columbus Crew Stadium; Attendance: 11,516; Referee: Mark Kadlecik; Assistant referees: Chris Strickland; Jeff Muschik; Fourth official: Allen Chapman

April 14 5	Philadelphia Union	1–0	Columbus Crew	Chester, PA
3:30 PM EDT	Gómez (yellow card) 25', (goal) 38'; Carroll (yellow card) 45+3'; Farfan (yellow card) 71'; Martínez (yellow card) 85'	Report	Gehrig (yellow card) 70'; Gaven (yellow card) 78'	Stadium: PPL Park; Attendance: 18,526; Referee: Michael Kennedy; Assistant referees: Kermit Quisenberry; Bill Dittmar; Fourth official: Andrew Chapin

April 21 6	Columbus Crew	2–2	Houston Dynamo	Columbus, OH
7:30 PM EDT	Tchani (yellow card) 17'; Gaven 63', 74'	Report	Hainault (yellow card) 55'; Bruin 59'; Ching 88'	Stadium: Columbus Crew Stadium; Attendance: 10,479; Referee: Chris Penso; Assistant referees: Jeff Muschik; Frank Anderson; Fourth official: Fotis Bazakos

April 28 7	Columbus Crew	0–1	Vancouver Whitecaps FC	Columbus, OH
7:30 PM EDT	Marshall (yellow card) 81'; O'Rourke (yellow card) 87'	Report	Harvey (yellow card) 50'; Koffie (yellow card) 67'; Young-Pyo 74'	Stadium: Columbus Crew Stadium; Attendance: 11,978; Referee: Elias Bazakos; Assistant referees: C.J. Morgante; James Conlee; Fourth official: Sorin Stoica

May 5 8	Portland Timbers	0–0	Columbus Crew	Portland, OR
10:30 PM EDT	Palmer (yellow card) 50'; Songo'o (yellow card) 75'; Chara (yellow card) 77'	Report	Miranda (yellow card) 57'	Stadium: Jeld-Wen Field; Attendance: 20,438; Referee: Edvin Jurisevic; Assistant referees: Mike Rottersman; Jeremy Hanson; Fourth official: Daniel Radford

May 12 9	Columbus Crew	2–1	FC Dallas	Columbus, OH
7:30 PM EDT	Meram (yellow card) 52', (goal) 67'; Miranda 72'; Mirošević (yellow card) 80'	Report	Castillo (yellow card) 60', (goal) 74'; Loyd (yellow card) 43' (yellow-red card) 63'; Jacobson (yellow card) 45'	Stadium: Columbus Crew Stadium; Attendance: 11,120; Referee: Baldomero Toledo; Assistant referees: Corey Parker; Jason Cullum; Fourth official: Matthew Foerster

May 19 10	San Jose Earthquakes	1–1	Columbus Crew	Santa Clara, CA
10:30 PM EDT	Lenhart (yellow card) 35'; Gordon (yellow card) 66', (goal) 90'; Corrales (yellow card) 90+4'	Report	Meram 45+2'; Tchani (yellow card) 90+1'	Stadium: Buck Shaw Stadium; Attendance: 10,256; Referee: Juan Guzman; Assistant referees: Ian Anderson; Colin Arblaster; Fourth official: Ramon Hernandez

May 23 11	Seattle Sounders FC	0–2	Columbus Crew	Seattle, WA
10:00 PM EDT	Meram 15'; Duka (yellow card) 47'; Mendes (yellow card) 71'; Rentería 76'	Report	Burch (yellow card) 85'; Osvaldo (yellow card) 88'	Stadium: CenturyLink Field; Attendance: 38,311; Referee: Geoff Gamble; Assistant referees: Kevin Duliba; Jeff Hosking; Fourth official: Alejandro Mariscal

May 26 12	Columbus Crew	2–1	Chicago Fire	Columbus, OH
7:00 PM EDT	Gaven 9'; Rentería 43'; Añor (yellow card) 67'	Report	Berry 72'	Stadium: Columbus Crew Stadium; Attendance: 16,024; Referee: Allen Chapman; Assistant referees: Greg Barkey; Jeff Muschik; Fourth official: José Carlos Rivero

June 16 13	New England Revolution	0–0	Columbus Crew	Foxborough, MA
7:30 PM EDT	Soares (yellow card) 21'; Moreno (yellow card) 43'	Report	Miranda (yellow card) 62'	Stadium: Gillette Stadium; Attendance: 12,218; Referee: Hilario Grajeda; Assistant referees: Chris Strickland; Eric Proctor; Fourth official: Sorin Stoica

June 23 14	Chicago Fire	2–1	Columbus Crew	Bridgeview, IL
8:30 PM EDT	Pappa 2'; Oduro 26'; Segares (red card) 29'; Gargan (yellow card) 85'	Report	Tchani 36'; George (yellow card) 66'; Schoenfeld (yellow card) 90'	Stadium: Toyota Park; Attendance: 17,144; Referee: Armando Villarreal; Assistant referees: Craig Lowry; Adam Garner; Fourth official: Ramon Hernandez

June 30 15	Columbus Crew	2–0	Real Salt Lake	Columbus, OH
9:00 PM EDT	Tchani 16'; Vuković (yellow card) 38'; Gaven 43'; George (yellow card) 82'	Report	Espíndola (yellow card) 57'; Steele (yellow card) 67'	Stadium: Columbus Crew Stadium; Attendance: 19,674; Referee: Geoff Gamble; Assistant referees: Daniel Belleau; Matt Nelson; Fourth official: Sorin Stoica

July 8 16	Montreal Impact	2–1	Columbus Crew	Montreal, QC
7:30 PM EDT	Nyassi (yellow card) 44'; Warner (yellow card) 68'; Valentin 78'; Bernier 89'	Report	Vuković (yellow card) 3'; Tchani (yellow card) 39'; Mirošević 64'; Rentería (yellow card) 68'	Stadium: Stade Saputo; Attendance: 15,118; Referee: Matthew Foerster; Assistant referees: Anthony Vasoli; Jeff Muschik; Fourth official: Mathieu Bourdeau

July 14 17	Columbus Crew	0–2	Sporting Kansas City	Columbus, OH
7:30 PM EDT	Añor (yellow card) 9'; Rentería (yellow card) 69'; Birchall (yellow card) 83'	Report	Peterson 7'; Joseph (yellow card) 57'; Nagamura (yellow card) 69'; Bunbury 82'	Stadium: Columbus Crew Stadium; Attendance: 17,588; Referee: Edvin Jurisevic; Assistant referees: Eric Boria; James Conlee; Fourth official: Sorin Stoica

July 21 18	Columbus Crew	1–0	D.C. United	Columbus, OH
7:30 PM EDT	Birchall 46'; Miranda (yellow card) 67'	Report		Stadium: Columbus Crew Stadium; Attendance: 17, 150; Referee: Chris Penso; Assistant referees: Claudiu Badea; Matt Nelson; Fourth official: Terry Vaughn

July 28 19	Sporting Kansas City	1–2	Columbus Crew	Kansas City, KS
8:30 PM EDT	Kamara 8'	Report	Arrieta 17', 34'; Grossman (yellow card) 90' (yellow-red card) 90+1'	Stadium: Livestrong Sporting Park; Attendance: 18,938; Referee: Dave Gantar; Assistant referees: George Gansner; Jeff Muschik; Fourth official: Leszek Stalmach

August 4 20	D.C. United	1–0	Columbus Crew	Washington, D.C.
7:30 PM EDT	Pontius 50'; Neal (yellow card) 74'	Report	Duka (yellow card) 24'; Meram (yellow card) 28'	Stadium: Robert F. Kennedy Memorial Stadium; Attendance: 14,640; Referee: Allen Chapman; Assistant referees: C.J. Morgante; Steve Taylor; Fourth official: José Carlos Rivero

August 15 21	Columbus Crew	1–1	LA Galaxy	Columbus, OH
7:00 PM EDT	Arrieta 48'	Report	Keane 64'; Marcelo Sarvas (yellow card) 88'	Stadium: Columbus Crew Stadium; Attendance: 17,019; Referee: Edvin Jurisevic; Assistant referees: James Conlee; Brian Dunn; Fourth official: Sorin Stoica

August 19 22	Houston Dynamo	2–2	Columbus Crew	Houston, TX
9:00 PM EDT	Davis 19'; Moffat 82'	Report	Grossman 33'; Duka (yellow card) 40'; Gaven 58'; Higuaín (yellow card) 79'	Stadium: BBVA Compass Stadium; Attendance: 20,567; Referee: Drew Fischer; Assistant referees: Chris Strickland; Jeff Muschik; Fourth official: Ted Unkel

August 22 23	Columbus Crew	2–1	Toronto FC	Columbus, OH
6:30 PM EDT	Gaven 4'; Higuaín (yellow card) 20', (goal) 58'	Report	O'Dea (yellow card) 69'; Silva 71'; Morgan (yellow card) 90'	Stadium: Columbus Crew Stadium; Attendance: 10,049; Referee: Sorin Stoica; Assistant referees: Jason Cullum; Kevin Klinger; Fourth official: Hilario Grajeda

August 25 24	Columbus Crew	4–3	New England Revolution	Columbus, OH
7:30 PM EDT	Higuaín 26', 43'; Arrieta 32', 86'	Report	Guy 17'; Bengtson 23'; Alston (yellow card) 70'; Nguyen 80' (pen.)	Stadium: Columbus Crew Stadium; Attendance: 13,651; Referee: Armando Villarreal; Assistant referees: Sean Hurd; James Conlee; Fourth official: Kevin Terry Jr.

August 29 25	Philadelphia Union	1–2	Columbus Crew	Chester, PA
8:00 PM EDT	Valdés 29'; Hoppenot (yellow card) 69'	Report	Birchall (yellow card) 28'; Williams 41', (red card) 68'; Gaven 90+5'	Stadium: PPL Park; Attendance: 16,568; Referee: Yader Reyes; Assistant referees: C.J. Morgante; Brian Dunn; Fourth official: José Carlos Rivero

September 1 26	Columbus Crew	2–1	Montreal Impact	Columbus, OH
7:30 PM EDT	O'Rourke (yellow card) 18'; Marshall 80'; Rentería 90+3'	Report	Warner (yellow card) 24'; Di Vaio 73'	Stadium: Columbus Crew Stadium; Attendance: 12,522; Referee: Chris Penso; Assistant referees: Chris Strickland; Eric Proctor; Fourth official: Daniel Fitzgerald

September 5 27	New England Revolution	2–0	Columbus Crew	Foxborough, MA
9:00 PM EDT	Imbongo 53', (yellow card) 53'; Marshall 74' (o.g.)	Report	O'Rourke (yellow card) 90+4'	Stadium: Gillette Stadium; Attendance: 10,345; Referee: Geoff Gamble; Assistant referees: Bill Dittmar; Scott Kachmarik; Fourth official: Niko Bratsis

September 15 28	New York Red Bulls	3–1	Columbus Crew	Harrison, NJ
6:00 PM EDT	Henry 9', 93'; Cahill (yellow card) 56'; McCarty 79'	Report	Mirošević 3'; James (yellow card) 49'	Stadium: Red Bull Arena; Attendance: 17,134; Referee: Abiodun Okulaja; Assistant referees: Adam Garner; Scott Kachmarik; Fourth official: José Carlos Rivero

September 19 29	Columbus Crew	1–0	Chivas USA	Columbus, OH
7:30 PM EDT	Meram 89', (yellow card) 90'	Report	Minda (yellow card) 75'; Valencia (yellow card) 86'; Correa (yellow card) 90'	Stadium: Columbus Crew Stadium; Attendance: 13,874; Referee: Jorge Gonzalez; Assistant referees: C.J. Morgante; Brian Dunn; Fourth official: Sorin Stoica

September 22 30	Chicago Fire	2–1	Columbus Crew	Bridgeview, IL
8:30 PM EDT	Rolfe 23', 26'; Johnson (yellow card) 89'	Report	Arrieta 15'; O'Rourke (yellow card) 29'; Rentería (yellow card) 35'	Stadium: Toyota Park; Attendance: 19,172; Referee: Michael Kennedy; Assistant referees: Peter Manikowski; Baboucarr Jallow; Fourth official: Ricardo Salazar

September 29 31	Columbus Crew	3–2	Philadelphia Union	Columbus, OH
7:30 PM EDT	Arrieta 44', 45+5'; O'Rourke (yellow card) 61'; Gruenebaum (yellow card) 65'; Mirošević 88'	Report	Okugo (yellow card) 45+3'; Cruz 65' (pen.); McInerney 86'	Stadium: Columbus Crew Stadium; Attendance: 14,673; Referee: Matthew Foerster; Assistant referees: Adam Wienckowski; Matt Nelson; Fourth official: Abbey Okulaja

October 7 32	Columbus Crew	1–1	Sporting Kansas City	Columbus, OH
4:00 PM EDT	James (yellow card) 67'; Gaven 90+1'	Report	Sapong 10'	Stadium: Columbus Crew Stadium; Attendance: 13,566; Referee: Mark Geiger; Assistant referees: Joe Fletcher; James Conlee; Fourth official: Hilario Grajeda

October 20 33	D.C. United	3–2	Columbus Crew	Washington, D.C.
7:30 PM EDT	DeLeon 39'; Saragosa 59'; Neal 90+1'	Report	Arrieta (yellow card) 4', (goal) 41'; Gaven 7'; Mendes (yellow card) 26'; Williams (yellow card) 59'	Stadium: Robert F. Kennedy Memorial Stadium; Attendance: 19,647; Referee: Edvin Jurisevic; Assistant referees: Anthony Vasoli; James Conlee; Fourth official: Jorge Gonzalez

October 28 34	Columbus Crew	2–1	Toronto FC	Columbus, OH
4:00 PM EDT	Higuaín 17', 61' (pen.)	Report	Wiedeman 27'; Dunfield (yellow card) 61'	Stadium: Columbus Crew Stadium; Attendance: 15,672; Referee: Drew Fischer; Assistant referees: Greg Barkey; Claudiu Badea; Fourth official: Geoff Gamble

=== MLS Cup Playoffs ===
The Columbus Crew failed to qualify for the playoffs in this season.

=== U.S. Open Cup ===
May 29 Third Round	Columbus Crew (MLS) (Ohio)	1–2	(Ohio) Dayton Dutch Lions (USLP)	Columbus, OH
7:30 PM EDT	Finlay (yellow card) 45+3'; Vargas 61' (pen.)	Report	Bardsley (yellow card) 33', (goal) 81'; Bartels 79'; Knotek (yellow card) 87'	Stadium: Columbus Crew Stadium; Attendance: 1,646; Referee: Sorin Stoica

== Reserve League ==
=== Eastern ===
Pos	Club	Pld	W	L	T	GF	GA	GD	Pts
1	Columbus Crew Reserves (C)	10	7	2	1	21	9	+12	22
2	Montreal Impact Reserves	10	7	2	1	19	10	+9	22
3	Philadelphia Union Reserves	10	4	4	2	20	20	0	14
4	New York Red Bulls Reserves	10	3	5	2	14	16	−2	11
5	D.C. United Reserves	9	3	5	1	9	19	−10	10
6	New England Revolution Reserves	10	2	5	3	9	15	−6	9
7	Toronto FC Reserves	9	2	5	2	13	16	−3	8

=== Match results ===
March 24 1	Columbus Crew	1–2	Montreal Impact	Columbus, OH
6:30 PM EDT	Grossman (yellow card) 84'; Perry 89'	Report	Neagle 23'; Montaño 55'	Stadium: Columbus Crew Stadium

March 31 2	Toronto FC	0–1	Columbus Crew	Toronto, ON
4:30 PM EDT	Mannella (yellow card) 81'	Report	Grossman (yellow card) 41'; Finlay (yellow card) 46', (goal) 58'	Stadium: BMO Field

April 7 3	Columbus Crew	2–1	New York Red Bulls	Columbus, OH
5:00 PM EDT	Tchani (yellow card) 40'; George (yellow card) 52'; Schoenfeld 70'; Meram 87'	Report	Borrajo (yellow card) 48'; Lade (yellow card) 69'; Pálsson (red card) 77'; Ruthven 90'	Stadium: Columbus Crew Stadium

April 15 4	Philadelphia Union	0–4	Columbus Crew	Chester, PA
6:00 PM EDT	Hoppenot (yellow card) 43'; Jordan (red card) 45'; Hernández (yellow card) 46'; Pfeffer (yellow card) 84'	Report	Rentería 12', 20', 38', (red card) 45'; Grossman 41'; Tchani (yellow card) 51' (yellow-red card) 78'; Meram (red card) 85'	Stadium: PPL Park

June 10 5	Columbus Crew	1–0	New England Revolution	Columbus, OH
10:00 AM EDT	Añor 81', (yellow card) 90'	Report	Boucher (yellow card) 56'	Stadium: Columbus Crew Stadium; Referee: Andrew Bigelow; Assistant referees: Joe Kuzma; John Safar; Fourth official: Michael Farmer

June 17 6	New England Revolution	1–0	Columbus Crew	Foxborough, MA
11:00 AM EDT	Nyassi 62'	Report	James (yellow card) 37'; Vargas (yellow card) 86'	Stadium: Gillette Stadium; Referee: Michael Solla; Assistant referees: Scott Kachmark; Joseph Poremba; Fourth official: Bruno Mozzo

July 2 7	New York Red Bulls	1–3	Columbus Crew	Montclair, NJ
11:00 AM EDT	Stahler (yellow card) 38'; Ballouchy 67'	Report	Arrieta 34'; Vargas 59'; Meram 77'	Stadium: MSU Soccer Park at Pittser Field; Referee: Jorge Gonzalez; Assistant referees: Albert Calise; Adam Alfi; Fourth official: Bartek Cieslak
Note: Originally scheduled for September 16

July 22 8	Columbus Crew	4–1	D.C. United	Obetz, OH
11:00 AM EDT	Vargas 6', (yellow card) 65'; Schoenfeld 19'; Gehrig 53'; Crognale (yellow card) 78'; Horton 85'	Report	Morsink (yellow card) 48'; Tan 49'; Dudar (yellow card) 65'	Stadium: Crew Training Center

September 30 9	Columbus Crew	3–3	Philadelphia Union	Columbus, OH
11:00 AM EDT	Rentería 23'; Vargas 53'; Meram 69'; Grossman (yellow card) 76'	Report	Mkosana 1'; Pfeffer 63'; Hernández (yellow card) 71'; Hoffman 73'	Stadium: Columbus Crew Stadium; Referee: Corey Richardson; Assistant referees: Andre Castel; Tre Gaither; Fourth official: Devon Duling

October 21 10	D.C. United	0–2	Columbus Crew	Washington, D.C.
11:00 AM EDT	Augusto (yellow card) 60'	Report	Tchani (yellow card) 44'; Duka 45'; Finlay 56'	Stadium: DC United Training Field
Note: Originally scheduled for August 5

== Statistics ==
=== Appearances and goals ===
Under "Apps" for each section, the first number represents the number of starts, and the second number represents appearances as a substitute.

No.	Pos	Nat	Player	Total		MLS		U.S. Open Cup	
No.	Pos	Nat	Player	Apps	Goals	Apps	Goals	Apps	Goals
1	GK	(United States) USA	William Hesmer	0	0	0+0	0	0+0	0
2	DF	(United States) USA	Rich Balchan	0	0	0+0	0	0+0	0
3	DF	(United States) USA	Josh Williams	31	1	27+3	1	0+1	0
4	DF	(United States) USA	Carlos Mendes	12	0	12+0	0	0+0	0
5	DF	(United States) USA	Danny O'Rourke	21	0	18+3	0	0+0	0
6	MF	(Cameroon) CMR	Tony Tchani	22	2	14+8	2	0+0	0
7	MF	(Venezuela) VEN	Bernardo Añor	12	1	5+6	1	0+1	0
8	MF	(Trinidad and Tobago) TTO	Chris Birchall	19	1	17+1	1	1+0	0
9	FW	(Iraq) IRQ	Justin Meram	23	4	11+11	4	1+0	0
10	MF	(Chile) CHI	Milovan Mirošević	26	4	25+1	4	0+0	0
11	MF	(United States) USA	Dilly Duka	20	0	14+6	0	0+0	0
12	MF	(United States) USA	Eddie Gaven	34	9	34+0	9	0+0	0
13	MF	(United States) USA	Ethan Finlay	16	0	3+12	0	1+0	0
14	DF	(United States) USA	Chad Marshall	24	2	24+0	2	0+0	0
16	DF	(United States) USA	Eric Gehrig	13	0	8+4	0	1+0	0
17	FW	(Costa Rica) CRC	Olman Vargas	12	2	7+4	1	1+0	1
18	FW	(United States) USA	Ben Speas	1	0	1+0	0	0+0	0
19	FW	(United States) USA	Tom Heinemann	1	0	0+1	0	0+0	0
20	FW	(Venezuela) VEN	Emilio Rentería	28	3	16+11	3	0+1	0
21	DF	(Chile) CHI	Sebastián Miranda	33	1	33+0	1	0+0	0
22	MF	(United States) USA	Cole Grossman	11	1	5+5	1	1+0	0
25	FW	(Costa Rica) CRC	Jairo Arrieta	18	9	18+0	9	0+0	0
26	DF	(Trinidad and Tobago) TTO	Julius James	13	0	7+5	0	1+0	0
27	FW	(United States) USA	Aaron Horton	0	0	0+0	0	0+0	0
28	GK	(United States) USA	Matt Lampson	4	0	1+2	0	1+0	0
30	GK	(United States) USA	Andy Gruenebaum	33	0	33+0	0	0+0	0
32	DF	(Montenegro) MNE	Nemanja Vuković	15	0	12+3	0	0+0	0
33	FW	(Argentina) ARG	Federico Higuaín	13	5	11+2	5	0+0	0
34	FW	(United States) USA	Aaron Schoenfeld	9	0	3+6	0	0+0	0
37	MF	(Trinidad and Tobago) TTO	Kevan George	8	0	4+3	0	1+0	0
			Own goal	0	0	-	0	-	0
Players who left Columbus during the season:
15	MF	(United States) USA	Kirk Urso	6	0	5+1	0	0+0	0
23	DF	(United States) USA	Korey Veeder	0	0	0+0	0	0+0	0
29	DF	(Jamaica) JAM	Shaun Francis	11	0	6+4	0	1+0	0
36	FW	(United States) USA	Aubrey Perry	1	0	0+0	0	1+0	0

=== Disciplinary record ===
No.	Pos.	Name	MLS		U.S. Open Cup		Total	
No.	Pos.	Name	Yellow card	Red card	Yellow card	Red card	Yellow card	Red card
1	GK	(United States) William Hesmer	0	0	0	0	0	0
2	DF	(United States) Rich Balchan	0	0	0	0	0	0
3	DF	(United States) Josh Williams	1	1	0	0	1	1
4	DF	(United States) Carlos Mendes	2	0	0	0	2	0
5	DF	(United States) Danny O'Rourke	5	0	0	0	5	0
6	MF	(Cameroon) Tony Tchani	3	0	0	0	3	0
7	MF	(Venezuela) Bernardo Añor	3	0	0	0	3	0
8	MF	(Trinidad and Tobago) Chris Birchall	4	0	0	0	4	0
9	FW	(Iraq) Justin Meram	3	0	0	0	3	0
10	MF	(Chile) Milovan Mirošević	2	0	0	0	2	0
11	MF	(United States) Dilly Duka	3	0	0	0	3	0
12	MF	(United States) Eddie Gaven	2	0	0	0	2	0
13	MF	(United States) Ethan Finlay	0	0	1	0	1	0
14	DF	(United States) Chad Marshall	1	0	0	0	1	0
16	DF	(United States) Eric Gehrig	1	0	0	0	1	0
17	FW	(Costa Rica) Olman Vargas	1	0	0	0	1	0
18	FW	(United States) Ben Speas	0	0	0	0	0	0
19	FW	(United States) Tom Heinemann	0	0	0	0	0	0
20	FW	(Venezuela) Emilio Rentería	4	0	0	0	4	0
21	DF	(Chile) Sebastián Miranda	3	0	0	0	3	0
22	MF	(United States) Cole Grossman	1	1	0	0	1	1
25	FW	(Costa Rica) Jairo Arrieta	1	0	0	0	1	0
26	DF	(Trinidad and Tobago) Julius James	2	0	0	0	2	0
27	FW	(United States) Aaron Horton	0	0	0	0	0	0
28	GK	(Argentina) Matt Lampson	0	0	0	0	0	0
30	GK	(United States) Andy Gruenebaum	2	0	0	0	2	0
32	DF	(Montenegro) Nemanja Vuković	2	0	0	0	2	0
33	FW	(Argentina) Federico Higuaín	2	0	0	0	2	0
34	FW	(United States) Aaron Schoenfeld	2	0	0	0	2	0
37	MF	(Trinidad and Tobago) Kevan George	2	0	0	0	2	0
Players who left Columbus during the season:
15	MF	(United States) Kirk Urso	1	0	0	0	1	0
23	DF	(United States) Korey Veeder	0	0	0	0	0	0
29	DF	(Jamaica) Shaun Francis	1	0	0	0	1	0
36	DF	(United States) Aubrey Perry	0	0	0	0	0	0

=== Clean sheets ===
No.	Name	MLS	U.S. Open Cup	Total	Games Played		
No.	Name	1	(United States) William Hesmer	0	0	0	0
28	(United States) Matt Lampson	0	0	0	4		
30	(United States) Andy Gruenebaum	8	0	8	33		

== Reserve League Statistics ==
=== Appearances and goals ===
Under "Apps" for each section, the first number represents the number of starts, and the second number represents appearances as a substitute.

No.	Pos	Nat	Player	Total		MLS Reserve League	
No.	Pos	Nat	Player	Apps	Goals	Apps	Goals
7	MF	(Venezuela) VEN	Bernardo Añor	4	1	4+0	1
25	FW	(Costa Rica) CRC	Jairo Arrieta	2	1	2+0	1
2	DF	(United States) USA	Rich Balchan	1	0	1+0	0
8	MF	(Trinidad and Tobago) TTO	Chris Birchall	1	0	1+0	0
-	GK	(United States) USA	Nick Ciraldo	0	0	0+0	0
-	DF	(United States) USA	Alex Crognale	4	0	1+3	0
-	GK	(United States) USA	Ethan Dewhurst	0	0	0+0	0
11	MF	(United States) USA	Dilly Duka	4	1	4+0	1
-	FW	(United States) USA	Brett Elder	2	0	0+2	0
-	MF	(United States) USA	Evans	1	0	0+1	0
13	MF	(United States) USA	Ethan Finlay	9	2	9+0	2
29	DF	(Jamaica) JAM	Shaun Francis	1	0	1+0	0
12	MF	(United States) USA	Eddie Gaven	1	0	0+1	0
16	DF	(United States) USA	Eric Gehrig	7	1	7+0	1
37	MF	(Trinidad and Tobago) TTO	Kevan George	8	0	7+1	0
22	MF	(United States) USA	Cole Grossman	8	1	8+0	1
1	GK	(United States) USA	William Hesmer	2	0	2+0	0
27	FW	(United States) USA	Aaron Horton	8	1	0+8	1
-	MF	(United States) USA	Blas Iribarren	0	0	0+0	0
26	DF	(Trinidad and Tobago) TTO	Julius James	2	0	2+0	0
-	GK	(United States) USA	Francisco Juarez	0	0	0+0	0
-	DF	(Georgia (country)) GEO	Irakli Khutsidze	1	0	0+1	0
-	MF	(United States) USA	Conor Klekota	2	0	0+2	0
-	FW	(United States) USA	Nathan Kohl	0	0	0+0	0
28	GK	(United States) USA	Matt Lampson	9	0	8+1	0
14	DF	(United States) USA	Chad Marshall	1	0	1+0	0
4	DF	(United States) USA	Carlos Mendes	2	0	2+0	0
9	FW	(Iraq) IRQ	Justin Meram	6	3	5+1	3
21	DF	(Chile) CHI	Sebastián Miranda	0	0	0+0	0
10	MF	(Chile) CHI	Milovan Mirošević	1	0	1+0	0
-	MF	(Somalia) SOM	Omar Mohamed	1	0	0+1	0
-	MF	(United States) USA	Rhodes Moore	5	0	0+5	0
-	GK	(United States) USA	Nick Noble	1	0	0+1	0
36	FW	(United States) USA	Aubrey Perry	6	1	5+1	1
20	FW	(Venezuela) VEN	Emilio Rentería	4	4	4+0	4
-	GK	(United States) USA	Carter Richardson	0	0	0+0	0
34	FW	(United States) USA	Aaron Schoenfeld	6	2	6+0	2
-	MF	(United States) USA	Andrew Souders	1	0	0+1	0
18	FW	(United States) USA	Ben Speas	6	0	3+3	0
-	MF	(United States) USA	Ben Swanson	1	0	0+1	0
6	MF	(Cameroon) CMR	Tony Tchani	6	0	6+0	0
17	FW	(Costa Rica) CRC	Olman Vargas	4	3	4+0	3
23	DF	(United States) USA	Korey Veeder	6	0	3+3	0
32	DF	(Montenegro) MNE	Nemanja Vuković	8	0	8+0	0
3	DF	(United States) USA	Josh Williams	5	0	5+0	0
-	DF	(United States) USA	Rylee Woods	0	0	0+0	0
-	GK	(United States) USA	Carl Woszczynski	0	0	0+0	0
			Own goal	0	0	-	0

=== Disciplinary record ===
No.	Pos.	Name	MLS Reserve League		Total	
No.	Pos.	Name	Yellow card	Red card	Yellow card	Red card
7	MF	(Venezuela) Bernardo Añor	1	0	1	0
25	FW	(Costa Rica) Jairo Arrieta	0	0	0	0
2	DF	(United States) Rich Balchan	0	0	0	0
8	MF	(Trinidad and Tobago) Chris Birchall	0	0	0	0
–	GK	(United States) Nick Ciraldo	0	0	0	0
–	DF	(United States) Alex Crognale	1	0	1	0
–	GK	(United States) Ethan Dewhurst	0	0	0	0
11	MF	(United States) Dilly Duka	0	0	0	0
–	FW	(United States) Brett Elder	0	0	0	0
–	MF	(United States) Evans	0	0	0	0
13	FW	(United States) Ethan Finlay	1	0	1	0
29	DF	(Jamaica) Shaun Francis	0	0	0	0
12	MF	(United States) Eddie Gaven	0	0	0	0
16	DF	(United States) Eric Gehrig	0	0	0	0
37	MF	(Trinidad and Tobago) Kevan George	1	0	1	0
22	MF	(United States) Cole Grossman	3	0	3	0
1	GK	(United States) William Hesmer	0	0	0	0
27	FW	(United States) Aaron Horton	0	0	0	0
–	MF	(United States) Blas Iribarren	0	0	0	0
26	DF	(Trinidad and Tobago) Julius James	1	0	1	0
–	GK	(United States) Francisco Juarez	0	0	0	0
–	DF	(Georgia (country)) Irakli Khutsidze	0	0	0	0
–	MF	(United States) Conor Klekota	0	0	0	0
–	FW	(United States) Nathan Kohl	0	0	0	0
28	GK	(Argentina) Matt Lampson	0	0	0	0
14	DF	(United States) Chad Marshall	0	0	0	0
4	DF	(United States) Carlos Mendes	0	0	0	0
9	FW	(Iraq) Justin Meram	0	1	0	1
21	DF	(Chile) Sebastián Miranda	0	0	0	0
10	MF	(Chile) Milovan Mirošević	0	0	0	0
–	MF	(Somalia) Omar Mohamed	0	0	0	0
–	MF	(United States) Rhodes Moore	0	0	0	0
–	GK	(United States) Nick Noble	0	0	0	0
36	DF	(United States) Aubrey Perry	0	0	0	0
20	FW	(Venezuela) Emilio Rentería	0	1	0	1
–	GK	(United States) Carter Richardson	0	0	0	0
34	FW	(United States) Aaron Schoenfeld	0	0	0	0
–	MF	(United States) Andrew Souders	0	0	0	0
18	FW	(United States) Ben Speas	0	0	0	0
–	MF	(United States) Ben Swanson	0	0	0	0
6	MF	(Cameroon) Tony Tchani	4	1	4	1
17	FW	(Costa Rica) Olman Vargas	2	0	2	0
23	DF	(United States) Korey Veeder	0	0	0	0
32	DF	(Montenegro) Nemanja Vuković	0	0	0	0
3	DF	(United States) Josh Williams	0	0	0	0
–	DF	(United States) Rylee Woods	0	0	0	0
–	GK	(United States) Carl Woszczynski	0	0	0	0

=== Clean sheets ===
No.	Name	MLS Reserve League	Total	Games Played		
No.	Name	–	(United States) Nick Ciraldo	0	0	0
–	(United States) Ethan Dewhurst	0	0	0		
1	(United States) William Hesmer	1	1	2		
–	(United States) Francisco Juarez	0	0	0		
28	(United States) Matt Lampson	3	3	9		
–	(United States) Nick Noble	0	0	1		
–	(United States) Carter Richardson	0	0	0		
–	(United States) Carl Woszczynski	0	0	0		

== Transfers ==
=== In ===
Pos.	Player	Transferred from	Fee/notes	Date	Source
MF	(Chile) Milovan Mirošević	(Chile) Universidad Católica	Free transfer	January 4, 2012	
FW	(Costa Rica) Olman Vargas	(Costa Rica) Deportivo Saprissa	Free transfer	January 6, 2012	
FW	(United States) Ben Speas	(United States) North Carolina Tar Heels	Signed to a homegrown contract	January 11, 2012	
FW	(United States) Ethan Finlay	(United States) Creighton Bluejays	Drafted in round 1 of the 2012 MLS SuperDraft	January 12, 2012	
DF	(United States) Aubrey Perry	(United States) South Florida Bulls	Drafted in round 2 of the 2012 MLS SuperDraft	March 1, 2012	
MF	(United States) Kirk Urso	(United States) North Carolina Tar Heels	Drafted in round 1 of the 2012 MLS Supplemental Draft	March 1, 2012	
MF	(Trinidad and Tobago) Kevan George	(United States) UCF Knights	Drafted in round 2 of the 2012 MLS SuperDraft	March 8, 2012	
DF	(Montenegro) Nemanja Vuković	(Montenegro) OFK Grbalj	Free transfer	March 21, 2012	
FW	(United States) Aaron Schoenfeld	(Canada) Montreal Impact	Traded for a third round draft pick in the 2013 MLS Supplemental Draft	March 23, 2012	
FW	(Costa Rica) Jairo Arrieta	(Costa Rica) Deportivo Saprissa	Free transfer	April 26, 2012	
MF	(Trinidad and Tobago) Chris Birchall	(United States) Los Angeles Galaxy	Free transfer	May 7, 2012	
FW	(Argentina) Federico Higuaín	(Argentina) Club Atlético Colón	Transfer, $650,500	July 27, 2012	
DF	(Cameroon) Tony Tchani	(United States) Columbus Crew		December 7, 2012	
MF	(United States) Wil Trapp	(United States) Akron Zips	Signed to a homegrown contract	December 13, 2012	

=== Out ===
Pos.	Player	Transferred to	Fee/notes	Date	Source
DF	(United States) Aubrey Perry	(Sweden) Gimo IF	Placed on waivers	June 27, 2012	
DF	(Jamaica) Shaun Francis	(United States) Charlotte Eagles	Placed on waivers	June 27, 2012	
DF	(United States) Korey Veeder	(United States) New York Cosmos	Placed on waivers	June 27, 2012	
MF	(United States) Kirk Urso	Deceased	Died due to a congenital heart defect	August 5, 2012	
MF	(United States) Cole Grossman	(United States) Real Salt Lake	Placed on waivers; Selected in the 2012 MLS Waiver Draft	November 19, 2012	
FW	(Costa Rica) Olman Vargas	(Costa Rica) C.S. Herediano	Placed on waivers	November 19, 2012	
DF	(Montenegro) Nemanja Vuković	(Montenegro) Mladost Podgorica	Placed on waivers	November 19, 2012	
DF	(United States) Rich Balchan	(United States) Real Salt Lake	Option declined	November 28, 2012	
DF	(Trinidad and Tobago) Julius James	(United States) Carolina RailHawks	Option declined	November 28, 2012	
DF	(Chile) Sebastián Miranda	(Chile) Everton de Viña del Mar	Option declined	November 28, 2012	
DF	(Trinidad and Tobago) Chris Birchall	(England) Port Vale F.C.	Option declined	November 28, 2012	
DF	(United States) Tom Heinemann	(Canada) Vancouver Whitecaps FC	Option declined	November 28, 2012	
GK	(United States) William Hesmer	(United States) Los Angeles Galaxy	Option declined; Selected in stage 2 of the 2012 MLS Re-Entry Draft	November 28, 2012	
MF	(Cameroon) Tony Tchani	(United States) Columbus Crew	Option declined	November 28, 2012	
DF	(United States) Carlos Mendes	(United States) New York Cosmos	Contract expired	November 28, 2012	
FW	(Venezuela) Emilio Rentería	(Uruguay) Defensor Sporting	Contract expired	November 28, 2012	

=== Loans out ===
Pos.	Player	Loanee club	Length/Notes	Beginning	End	Source
FW	(United States) Aaron Horton	(United States) Dayton Dutch Lions		April 30, 2012	June 3, 2012	

=== MLS Draft picks ===
Draft picks are not automatically signed to the team roster. Only those who are signed to a contract will be listed as transfers in. The picks for the Columbus Crew are listed below:

2012 Columbus Crew SuperDraft Picks
Round	Pick	Player	Position	College
1	10	(United States) Ethan Finlay	MF	Creighton Bluejays
2	26	(United States) Aubrey Perry	DF	South Florida Bulls
2	29	(Trinidad and Tobago) Kevan George	MF	UCF Knights

2012 Columbus Crew Supplemental Draft Picks
Round	Pick	Player	Position	College
1	10	(United States) Kirk Urso	MF	North Carolina Tar Heels
2	29	(United States) Jamie Finch	DF	Washington Huskies
3	48	(Ghana) Darren Amoo	FW	Liberty Flames
4	67	(United States) Andrew Bulls	FW	UMBC Retrievers

== Awards ==
MLS Team of the Week
Week	Starters	Honorable Mentions	Opponent(s)	Link
3		(Jamaica) Shaun Francis (Venezuela) Emilio Rentería	(Canada) Montreal Impact	
4		(Jamaica) Shaun Francis (United States) Andy Gruenebaum (United States) Chad Marshall	(Canada) Toronto FC	
6		(United States) Chad Marshall	(United States) Philadelphia Union	
7	(United States) Eddie Gaven	(United States) Chad Marshall	(United States) Houston Dynamo	
8		(United States) Aaron Schoenfeld	(Canada) Vancouver Whitecaps FC	
9		(United States) Andy Gruenebaum (United States) Josh Williams	(United States) Portland Timbers	
10		(Iraq) Justin Meram (Chile) Sebastián Miranda	(United States) FC Dallas	
11	(United States) Andy Gruenebaum	(Iraq) Justin Meram	(United States) San Jose Earthquakes	
12	(United States) Andy Gruenebaum (Venezuela) Emilio Rentería (Poland) Robert Warzycha (Coach)	(United States) Eddie Gaven	(United States) Seattle Sounders FC (United States) Chicago Fire	
13–15	(United States) Andy Gruenebaum	(United States) Josh Williams	(United States) New England Revolution	
16		(Cameroon) Tony Tchani	(United States) Chicago Fire	
17	(United States) Eddie Gaven	(United States) Danny O'Rourke (United States) Josh Williams	(United States) Real Salt Lake	
18		(United States) Chad Marshall (United States) Josh Williams	(Canada) Montreal Impact	
20		(Costa Rica) Jairo Arrieta (Trinidad and Tobago) Chris Birchall (United States) Andy Gruenebaum	(United States) D.C. United	
21	(Costa Rica) Jairo Arrieta (Poland) Robert Warzycha (Coach)	(United States) Andy Gruenebaum	(United States) Sporting Kansas City	
24		(Costa Rica) Jairo Arrieta (United States) Eddie Gaven (Argentina) Federico Higuaín	(United States) Los Angeles Galaxy (United States) Houston Dynamo	
25	(Argentina) Federico Higuaín (Costa Rica) Jairo Arrieta	(United States) Eddie Gaven (Chile) Milovan Mirošević	(United States) New England Revolution	
26	(Argentina) Federico Higuaín	(United States) Eddie Gaven (Iraq) Justin Meram (Venezuela) Emilio Rentería	(United States) Philadelphia Union (Canada) Montreal Impact	
27		(United States) Andy Gruenebaum	(United States) New England Revolution	
28		(United States) Andy Gruenebaum	(United States) New York Red Bulls	
29		(Costa Rica) Jairo Arrieta (Iraq) Justin Meram (Cameroon) Tony Tchani	(United States) Chivas USA (United States) Chicago Fire	
30		(Costa Rica) Jairo Arrieta (Argentina) Federico Higuaín	(United States) Philadelphia Union	
31	(United States) Eddie Gaven	(United States) Dilly Duka	(United States) Sporting Kansas City	
32		(Costa Rica) Jairo Arrieta (United States) Josh Williams	(Canada) Toronto FC	

=== MLS Player of the Week ===
Week	Player	Opponent	Link
12	(Venezuela) Emilio Rentería	Seattle Sounders FC	
21	(Costa Rica) Jairo Arrieta	Sporting Kansas City	
25	(Argentina) Federico Higuaín	Toronto FC; New England Revolution	
26	(Argentina) Federico Higuaín	Philadelphia Union; Montreal Impact	

=== MLS Save of the Week ===
Week	Player	Opponent	Link
11	(United States) Andy Gruenebaum	San Jose Earthquakes	

=== Postseason ===
MLS Newcomer of the Year

- FW Federico Higuaín

=== Crew Team Awards ===
- Most Valuable Player – Andy Gruenebaum
- Defensive Player of the Year – Andy Gruenebaum
- Scoring Champion – Jairo Arrieta & Eddie Gaven
- Breakout Performance of the Year – Jairo Arrieta
- Goal of the Year – Sebastian Miranda
- Humanitarian of the Year – Eddie Gaven
- Comeback Player of the Year – Julius James
- Kirk Urso Heart Award – Kirk Urso
- Special Recognition, The 200 Club – Eddie Gaven & Chad Marshall
- Jim Nelson Fan of the Year – Alex Thomas
- Academy U15/U16 Player of the Year – Ben Swanson
- Academy U17/U18 Player of the Year – Zach Mason
- Academy U19/U20 Player of the Year – Sage Gardner
