= 2012 MLS supplemental draft =

College draft for soccer teams

The 2012 MLS supplemental draft was a secondary draft that was held by Major League Soccer via conference call on January 17, 2012. The draft was four rounds and all 19 MLS clubs participated.

== Changes from 2011 ==
- As an expansion club, Montreal received the first pick in the Supplemental Draft.
- Due to the league shortening the 2012 MLS SuperDraft from three rounds to two rounds, the Supplemental Draft was increased from three rounds to four rounds. Previously traded SuperDraft Round 3 picks became Supplemental Draft Round 1 picks.

== Selection Order ==
The official selection order was set by Major League Soccer on October 21, 2011:

1. 2012 expansion team Montreal Impact had the first selection;
2. The eight clubs which did not qualify for the playoffs received picks #2 through #9 (in reverse order of season points);
3. The two clubs eliminated in the Wild Card round of playoffs received picks #10 and #11 (in reverse order of season points);
4. The four clubs eliminated in the Conference Semifinals received picks #12 through #15 (in reverse order of season points);
5. The two clubs eliminated in the Conference Finals received picks #16 and #17 (in reverse order of season points);
6. The club which lost the 2011 MLS Cup received pick #18;
7. The club which won the 2011 MLS Cup received pick #19.

This selection order held for all four rounds of the Supplemental Draft.

=== Round 1 ===
Pick #	MLS team	Player	Position	Affiliation
1	Montreal Impact	(Canada) Evan James	Forward	UNC Charlotte; Hamilton Rage
2	Vancouver Whitecaps FC	(Mexico) Gienir García	Defender	Cruz Azul
3	New England Revolution	(Jamaica) Dawyne Smith	Forward	Bethel; Reading United
4	Toronto FC	(United States) Michael Green	Midfielder	New Mexico
5	Chivas USA (Note: #5: Chivas USA → Sporting Kansas City → Chivas USA. 29 November 2011: Chivas USA acquired this first-round selection from Sporting Kansas City in exchange for midfielder Paulo Nagamura. On 21 November 2011, Sporting Kansas City had acquired this selection and a third-round Supplemental Draft selection from Chivas USA in exchange for midfielder Ryan Smith.)	(United States) R. J. Allen	Defender	Monmouth; Central Jersey Spartans
6	Real Salt Lake (Note: #6: San Jose Earthquakes → Real Salt Lake. 1 December 2011: Real Salt Lake acquired this first-round selection from San Jose Earthquakes in exchange for midfielder Jean Alexandre.)	(Australia) Andy Rose	Midfielder	UCLA; Ventura County Fusion
7	Houston Dynamo (Note: #7: D.C. United → Houston Dynamo. 14 August 2009: Houston Dynamo acquired a then third-round SuperDraft selection from D.C. United in exchange for defender Julius James. (Note: Goff, Steven (August 15, 2009). "DCU Makes Several Moves". The Washington Post.) This pick became a first-round Supplemental Draft pick when MLS shortened the 2012 SuperDraft to two rounds.)	(United States) Brian Ownby	Forward	Virginia; Reading United
8	Portland Timbers	(United States) Ryan Kawulok	Midfielder	Portland; Portland Timbers U23's
9	Chicago Fire	(Ghana) Evans Frimpong	Forward	Delaware; Reading United
10	Columbus Crew	(United States) Kirk Urso	Midfielder	North Carolina; Reading United
11	FC Dallas	(United States) Alex Lee	Defender	Maryland; Real Maryland Monarchs
12	Houston Dynamo (Note: #12: New York Red Bulls → Houston Dynamo. 17 December 2010: Houston Dynamo acquired a then third-round SuperDraft selection and the rights to defender Hunter Freeman from New York Red Bulls in exchange for allocation money. The traded pick is New York's natural selection. This pick became a first-round Supplemental Draft pick when MLS shortened the 2012 SuperDraft to two rounds.)	(United States) Karo Okiomah	Forward	High Point; Carolina Dynamo
13	Philadelphia Union	(United States) Tom Brandt	Defender	Pennsylvania
14	Toronto FC (Note: #14: Colorado Rapids → Toronto FC. 30 November 2010: Toronto FC acquired a then third-round SuperDraft selection from Colorado Rapids in exchange for midfielder Joseph Nane. The traded pick is Colorado's natural selection. This pick became a first-round Supplemental Draft pick when MLS shortened the 2012 SuperDraft to two rounds.)	(Jamaica) Nickardo Blake	Defender	Connecticut
15	Chicago Fire (Note: #15: Seattle Sounders FC → Chicago Fire. 26 August 2011: Chicago Fire acquired a then third-round SuperDraft selection and the #6 position in the MLS allocation order from Seattle Sounders FC in exchange for the #4 position in the MLS allocation order. Seattle then used the #4 allocation position to select forward Sammy Ochoa. This pick became a first-round Supplemental Draft pick when MLS shortened the 2012 SuperDraft to two rounds.)	(United States) Carl Woszczynski	Goalkeeper	UAB; Atlanta Blackhawks
16	Sporting Kansas City	(United States) Shawn Singh	Defender	UCLA; Ventura County Fusion
17	Real Salt Lake	(Argentina) Emiliano Bonfigli	Forward	Manta FC
18	Houston Dynamo	(United States) Eder Arreola	Midfielder	UCLA; Orange County Blue Star
19	Los Angeles Galaxy	(United States) Bryan Gaul	Midfielder	Bradley; GPS Portland Phoenix

=== Round 2 ===
Pick #	MLS team	Player	Position	Affiliation
20	Montreal Impact	(United States) Aaron Schoenfeld	Forward	East Tennessee State; GPS Portland Phoenix
21	Vancouver Whitecaps FC	(United States) Greg Klazura	Defender	Notre Dame; Indiana Invaders
22	New England Revolution	(United States) Alec Purdie	Midfielder	Indiana
23	Toronto FC	(United States) Mykell Bates	Defender	Santa Clara
24	Chivas USA	(United States) Brian Rowe	Goalkeeper	UCLA; Ventura County Fusion
25	San Jose Earthquakes	(Peru) César Díaz Pizarro	Forward	UC Riverside
26	D.C. United	(United States) Lance Rozeboom	Midfielder	New Mexico; Des Moines Menace
27	Portland Timbers	(United States) Miguel Ibarra	Midfielder	UC Irvine; Orange County Blue Star
28	Chivas USA (Note: #28: Chicago Fire → Chivas USA. 23 March 2011: Chivas USA acquired a 2012 Supplemental Draft pick, which became this pick, from Chicago Fire in exchange for the rights to defender Yamith Cuesta.)	(United States) Daniel Steres	Defender	San Diego State; Ventura County Fusion
29	Columbus Crew	(United States) Jamie Finch	Defender	Washington; Washington Crossfire
30	Chivas USA (Note: #30: FC Dallas → Chivas USA. 1 April 2011: Chivas USA acquired a then first-round 2012 Supplemental Draft pick from FC Dallas in exchange for the rights to forward Maykel Galindo. This pick became a second-round pick when MLS shortened the 2012 SuperDraft to two rounds.)	(Germany) Fabian Kling	Defender	Fort Lewis
31	New York Red Bulls	(United States) Mike Volk	Defender	Virginia
32	Philadelphia Union	(United States) Krystian Witkowski	Forward	Marist; FC Buffalo
33	Seattle Sounders FC (Note: #33: Colorado Rapids → FC Dallas → Seattle Sounders FC. 15 December 2010: Seattle Sounders FC acquired a then fourth-round SuperDraft selection from FC Dallas in exchange for goalkeeper Chris Seitz. This pick became a second-round Supplemental Draft pick when MLS shortened the 2012 SuperDraft to two rounds. On 30 July 2010, FC Dallas had acquired a conditional 2012 SuperDraft selection, which became this pick, and a fourth-round selection in the 2011 MLS SuperDraft (which was converted to a first-round selection in the 2011 MLS Supplemental Draft) on 30 July 2010 from Colorado Rapids in exchange for defender Anthony Wallace. The conditional 2012 SuperDraft pick became a second-round Supplemental Draft pick when MLS shortened the 2012 SuperDraft to two rounds.)	(United States) Tim Pontius	Defender	UC Santa Barbara
34	Seattle Sounders FC	(England) Jason Banton	Forward	Leicester City
35	Sporting Kansas City	(El Salvador) Pablo Punyed	Midfielder	St. John's
36	Real Salt Lake	(Luxembourg) Oliver Kupe	Forward	Northwestern
37	Chivas USA (Note: #37: Houston Dynamo → Chivas USA. 21 January 2010: Chivas USA acquired a then fourth-round SuperDraft selection from Houston Dynamo in exchange for midfielder Kevin Harmse. The trade was for a conditional third-round or fourth-round selection. (Note: "Dynamo acquire rights to midfielder Harmse" (Press release). Fox Sports Houston. January 21, 2010.) As Harmse was released before playing a game for Houston the pick was fourth-round. This pick became a second-round Supplemental Draft pick when MLS shortened the 2012 SuperDraft to two rounds.)	(United States) Kevin Venegas	Midfielder	Cal State Fullerton
38	Los Angeles Galaxy	(United States) Rafael Garcia	Defender	Cal State Northridge; FC Hasental

=== Round 3 ===
Pick #	MLS team	Player	Position	Affiliation
39	Montreal Impact	(United States) Steven Miller	Forward	Colgate; Ocean City Nor'easters
40	Vancouver Whitecaps FC	(United States) Andrew Fontein	Goalkeeper	UC Irvine
41	New England Revolution	(United States) Kevin Garcia	Defender	Villanova; Long Island Rough Riders
42	Toronto FC	(Brazil) Arthur Ivo	Midfielder	SMU
43	Sporting Kansas City (Note: #43: Chivas USA → Sporting Kansas City. 21 November 2011: Sporting Kansas City acquired this selection and a first-round Supplemental Draft selection from Chivas USA in exchange for midfielder Ryan Smith.)	(Serbia) Stefan Antonijevic	Defender	Valparaiso
44	San Jose Earthquakes	(United States) David Tiemstra	Defender	Ohio State
45	D.C. United	(United States) Charles Rodriguez	Defender	UNC Charlotte; Nashville Metros
46	Portland Timbers	(Guam) Doug Herrick	Goalkeeper	St. Mary's; Washington Crossfire
47	Chicago Fire	(United States) Tony Walls	Defender	UWGB; Michigan Bucks
48	Columbus Crew	(Ghana) Darren Amoo	Forward	Liberty
49	FC Dallas	(United States) Walter Hines	Forward	St. John's
50	New York Red Bulls	(United States) Christian Barreiro	Midfielder	Pennsylvania; Reading United
51	Philadelphia Union	(United States) Antoine Hoppenot	Forward	Princeton; Central Jersey Spartans
52	Colorado Rapids	(Japan) Kohei Yamada	Midfielder	Thespa Kusatsu
53	Seattle Sounders FC	(Ethiopia) Abdul Aman	Forward	Washington; North Sound SeaWolves
54	Sporting Kansas City	(United States) Kyle Miller	Defender	Rockhurst; Kansas City Brass
55	Real Salt Lake	(Peru) Benjamín Ubierna	Midfielder	Universidad San Martín de Porres
56	Houston Dynamo	(Ghana) Philip Aseweh	Forward	Liberty
57	Los Angeles Galaxy	(Brazil) Yuri Gorentzvaig	Forward	AA Flamengo

=== Round 4 ===
Pick #	MLS team	Player	Position	Affiliation
58	Montreal Impact	(Canada) Carl Haworth	Forward	Niagara; Forest City London
59	Vancouver Whitecaps FC	(United States) Mark Fetrow	Defender	Penn State
60	New England Revolution	(United States) Michael Roach	Forward	Saint Louis
61	Toronto FC	(United States) Michael Mazzullo	Midfielder	Columbia
62	Los Angeles Galaxy (Note: #62: Chivas USA → Los Angeles Galaxy. 17 August 2011: Los Angeles Galaxy acquired a then third-round 2012 Supplemental Draft pick from Chivas USA in exchange for forward Juan Pablo Ángel. This pick became a fourth-round pick when MLS shortened the 2012 SuperDraft to two rounds.)	(United States) Steven Posa	Forward	San Diego
63	San Jose Earthquakes	(United States) James Kiffe	Midfielder	UC Santa Barbara
64	D.C. United	(United States) Matt Kuhn	Midfielder	Drake
65	Portland Timbers	(United States) Logan McDaniel	Midfielder	Loyola Marymount; Des Moines Menace
66	Chicago Fire	(United States) Justin Chavez	Midfielder	Tulsa
67	Columbus Crew	(United States) Andrew Bulls	Forward	UMBC; Bradenton Academics
68	FC Dallas	(United States) Ian Kalis	Defender	SMU
69	New York Red Bulls	(United States) Nate Polak	Midfielder	Hastings College
70	Philadelphia Union	(United States) Brandon Zimmerman	Midfielder	Santa Clara
71	Colorado Rapids	(United States) Joel Helmick	Goalkeeper	Longwood
72	Seattle Sounders FC	(United States) Wes Feighner	Defender	Cal Poly; Orange County Blue Star
73	San Jose Earthquakes (Note: #73: Sporting Kansas City → San Jose Earthquakes. On draft day, San Jose Earthquakes acquired this fourth-round 2012 Supplemental Draft pick from Sporting Kansas City in exchange for the rights to midfielder Michael Thomas.)	(United States) Tyler Krumpe	Defender	Loyola Marymount; Orange County Blue Star
74	Real Salt Lake	PASS		
75	Houston Dynamo	(United States) Daniel Roberts	Midfielder	UNC Wilmington; Carolina Dynamo
76	Los Angeles Galaxy	(United States) Justin Davies	Defender	San Diego State

== Note on SuperDraft Trades ==
MLS reduced the 2012 MLS SuperDraft from three rounds to two rounds on October 21, 2011, which in turn affected trades involving 2012 SuperDraft Round 3 and Round 4 selections. These selections became 2012 Supplemental Draft Round 1 and Round 2 selections.
