= Jason Cascio =

American soccer player (born 1985)

Personal information
- Full name: Jason Cascio
- Date of birth: March 5, 1985 (age 41)
- Place of birth: Redmond, Washington, U.S.
- Height: 5 ft 10 in (1.78 m)
- Positions: Defender; forward

College career
Years	Team	Apps	(Gls)
2004–2007	Seattle Redhawks	78	(31)

Senior career*
Years	Team	Apps	(Gls)
2008	Seattle Sounders	24	(1)
2009	Seattle Wolves	1	(0)
2010	Kitsap Pumas	14	(3)
- * Club domestic league appearances and goals as of August 7, 2010

Jason Cascio (born March 5, 1985) is an American former soccer player.

== Career ==
=== Youth and college ===
Cascio grew up in Chandler, Arizona and attended Hamilton High School, where he was a three time All State soccer player. In addition to playing soccer, he was a member of Hamilton's 2003 Arizona state football championship team. Cascio attended Seattle University, playing on the men's soccer team from 2003 to 2006. His freshman season as Seattle won the Division II NCAA soccer championship.

=== Professional ===
In 2008, Cascio signed with the Seattle Sounders of the USL First Division. He appeared in 24 USL-1 games and scored 1 goal for the Sounders, until the team folded at the end of 2008 due to Seattle Sounders FC joining Major League Soccer.

Having been unable to secure a professional contract, Cascio signed with Seattle Wolves of the USL Premier Development League for the 2009 season.
