= Aaron Schoenfeld =

American soccer player

Aaron Schoenfeld אהרון שוינפלד
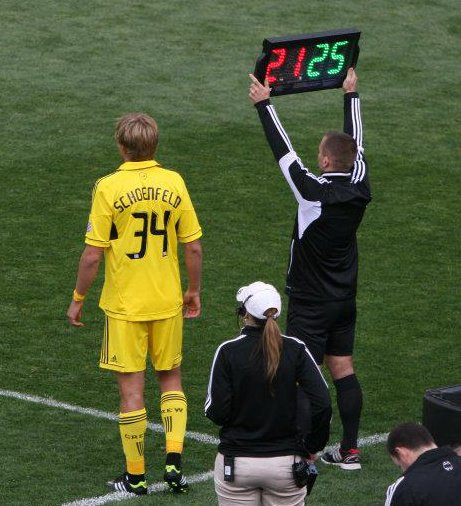

Personal information
- Full name: Aaron Maxwell Schoenfeld
- Date of birth: April 17, 1990 (age 36)
- Place of birth: Knoxville, Tennessee, United States
- Height: 6 ft 4 in (1.93 m)
- Position: Forward

College career
Years	Team	Apps	(Gls)
2008–2011	East Tennessee State Buccaneers	72	(20)

Senior career*
Years	Team	Apps	(Gls)
2011	GPS Portland Phoenix	15	(2)
2012–2015	Columbus Crew SC	51	(5)
2014	→ Dayton Dutch Lions (loan)	18	(12)
2016	Maccabi Netanya	2	(0)
2016–2017	Hapoel Tel Aviv	23	(10)
2017–2020	Maccabi Tel Aviv	47	(4)
2020	Minnesota United	14	(1)
2021	Austin FC	0	(0)
Total		170	(34)
- * Club domestic league appearances and goals as of November 22, 2021

Aaron Maxwell Schoenfeld (Hebrew: אהרון מקסוול שוינפלד; born April 17, 1990) is an Israeli-American former professional soccer player who played as a forward.

== Early life ==
Schoenfeld is Jewish, and he was born in Knoxville, Tennessee, to Robert and Sherry. Schoenfeld's family are members of Temple Beth El in Knoxville. In an interview, Schoenfeld described his Jewish upbringing as being very traditional, with his family regularly attending synagogue, keeping kosher, and observing Shabbat.

For high school, Schoenfeld attended Bearden High School and had a soccer career there, highlighted by a Tennessee state championship and a state championship final appearance.

He played on the collegiate level at East Tennessee State University, scoring 20 goals with 10 assists in 72 games for the East Tennessee State Buccaneers.

== Club career ==
Schoenfeld was originally drafted by the Montreal Impact in the second round (20th pick overall) of the 2012 MLS Supplemental Draft.

On March 23, 2012, the Columbus Crew announced they had signed Schoenfeld after acquiring his rights from the Impact in exchange for a conditional pick in the 2013 MLS Supplemental Draft. He made his professional debut the day after his signing. He came on as a substitute for Emilio Renteria in the 69th minute against Montreal Impact, the team that had recently traded him. The Crew went on to win 2–0.

While on loan with the Dayton Dutch Lions in 2014, Schoenfeld became the club's record holder for goals scored in a single season (12). Upon his return to the Columbus Crew, Schoenfeld scored a brace against the New York Red Bulls. He would later cite this as a highlight of his career, as after the match he received complimentary feedback from New York striker, Thierry Henry.

In 2015, Schoenfeld signed with Maccabi Netanya following a brief trial. Schoenfeld was given temporary Israeli resident status by the Israeli Ministry of Interior on January 14, 2016, so he would not count as a foreigner for Netanya. Upon signing, Schoenfeld told the Israeli media, "having grown up in a Zionist Jewish family, I have always wanted to come and play soccer in Israel."

On January 23, 2016, Schoenfeld made his Premier League debut for Netanya, coming on as a substitute for Itzik Cohen in a 1–0 loss to Hapoel Kfar Saba at Levita Stadium. After just two matches with Netanya, Schoenfeld signed a two-and-a-half-year deal with Hapoel Tel Aviv and was sold together with Netanya youth player, Fadi Najar, in exchange for ₪1 million.

Schoenfeld made his debut with Hapoel Tel Aviv in a Tel Aviv derby on February 7, 2016, scoring the opening goal in the second minute. He joined Maccabi Tel Aviv on Feb 2017.

On February 12, 2020, Schoenfeld returned to Major League Soccer, signing with Minnesota United FC. Minnesota acquired Schoenfeld's MLS rights from the Columbus Crew in exchange for a second round pick in the 2021 MLS SuperDraft and additional considerations. Following their 2020 season, Minnesota opted to decline their contract option on Schoenfeld.

On February 4, 2021, Schoenfeld joined MLS side Austin FC as a free agent ahead of their inaugural season. Following the 2021 season, Schoenfeld's contract option was declined by Austin.

== International career ==
Media reports of Schoenfeld being called up to the Israel national team for a friendly against Croatia started to surface on February 14, 2016, but has to date never received an invitation by the Israeli team.

== Honors ==
=== Club ===
Maccabi Tel Aviv

- Israeli Premier League: 2018–19
- Toto Cup: 2017–18, 2018–19

== Personal life ==
Schoenfeld is married to fellow soccer player Abby Dahlkemper. They announced their engagement in December 2020 and were married on January 5, 2021.

== See also ==
- List of select Jewish association football (soccer) players
