= César Pizarro =

Peruvian footballer (born 1990)

Personal information
- Full name: César Díaz Pizarro
- Date of birth: 16 September 1990 (age 36)
- Place of birth: Chiclayo, Peru
- Height: 6 ft 1 in (1.85 m)
- Position: Forward

Youth career
- 2008–2011: UC Riverside Highlanders

Senior career*
Years	Team	Apps	(Gls)
2012–2013	San Jose Earthquakes	1	(0)
- * Club domestic league appearances and goals

César Díaz Pizarro (born 16 September 1990) is a Peruvian footballer.

== Career ==
=== College ===
Diaz Pizarro played college at the UC Riverside from 2008 to 2011. During his time at Riverside he was named Big West Offensive player of the year and All Big West first team in 2011.

=== Professional ===
Diaz Pizarro was selected in the second round of the 2012 MLS Supplemental Draft (25th overall) by the San Jose Earthquakes club and was signed 2 weeks later.

He made his professional MLS debut on 27 May 2012, in the 60th minute in a 2–1 loss against Sporting KC. After struggling with a sports hernia throughout the year, he underwent surgery after the end of the regular season.

== Honors ==
=== San Jose Earthquakes ===
- Major League Soccer Supporter's Shield (1): 2012
