= Andy Gruenebaum =

American soccer player

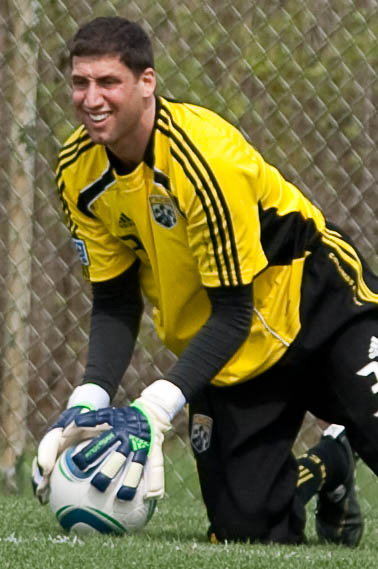
- Andy Gruenebaum 2011

Personal information
- Date of birth: December 30, 1982 (age 43)
- Place of birth: Overland Park, Kansas, United States
- Height: 6 ft 1 in (1.85 m)

College career
Years	Team	Apps	(Gls)
2001–2005	Kentucky Wildcats		

Senior career*
Years	Team	Apps	(Gls)
2005	Des Moines Menace	15	(0)
2006–2013	Columbus Crew	80	(0)
2014	Sporting Kansas City	11	(0)
Total		106	(0)
- * Club domestic league appearances and goals as of October 28, 2014

Andy Gruenebaum (/ˈɡriːnəbɔːm/; born December 30, 1982) is a retired American professional soccer goalkeeper. He was selected by the Columbus Crew with the third overall pick in the 2006 MLS Supplemental Draft. He made his MLS debut in 2006.

== Career ==
=== Amateur ===
Gruenebaum, who is Jewish, is an Overland Park, Kansas, native. He was an All-American at Blue Valley North High School. He attended the University of Kentucky, where he recorded 21 shutouts in 66 collegiate games. Gruenebaum earned All-Conference honors and picked up the nickname "The Hebrew Hammer."

Prior to his senior season, Gruenebaum starred for the Des Moines Menace in the USL Premier Development League and was named MVP of the 2005 PDL championship as the Menace won their first title.

=== Professional ===
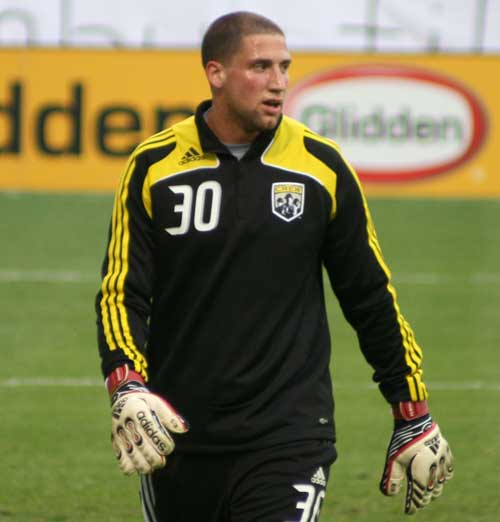
Andy Gruenebaum

Gruenebaum was selected by the Columbus Crew with the third overall pick in the 2006 MLS Supplemental Draft. He made his MLS debut in May 2006 when Jon Busch suffered a knee injury in a match against D.C. United and started the final two matches of the season.

He started ten matches in the 2007 season, earning his first two career shutouts in back-to-back matches in April. However, his playing time gradually decreased as Will Hesmer established himself as the starting goalkeeper. He made just one league start in 2008 as the Crew won the Supporters' Shield and MLS Cup.

Playing time remained sporadic due to the presence of Hesmer and Gruenebaum's own injuries, but he finally enjoyed a breakout season in 2012, starting 33 matches (including eight shutouts) as Hesmer missed time with injuries. He continued to start in 2013 despite missing time due to injuries.

Following the 2013 season, Gruenenbaum was traded to his hometown club, Sporting Kansas City, in exchange for a second-round pick in the 2016 MLS SuperDraft. After one season in Kansas City, Gruenenbaum's 2015 contract option was declined and he entered the 2014 MLS Re-Entry Draft. He was selected in stage one of the draft by San Jose Earthquakes. However, Gruenenbaum instead opted to retire and take a role as a broadcaster with Sporting.

== Career statistics ==
Club	Season	League			Cup		Other		Total	
Club	Season	League	Apps	Goals	Apps	Goals	Apps	Goals	Apps	Goals
Columbus Crew	2006	MLS	3	0	0	0	0	0	3	0
Columbus Crew	2007	MLS	10	0	1	0	0	0	11	0
Columbus Crew	2008	MLS	1	0	0	0	0	0	1	0
Columbus Crew	2009	MLS	10	0	0	0	0	0	10	0
Columbus Crew	2010	MLS	0	0	0	0	0	0	0	0
Columbus Crew	2011	MLS	2	0	0	0	0	0	2	0
Columbus Crew	2012	MLS	33	0	0	0	0	0	33	0
Columbus Crew	2013	MLS	21	0	0	0	0	0	21	0
Columbus Crew	Total		80	0	1	0	0	0	81	0
Sporting Kansas City	2014	MLS	11	0	2	0	0	0	13	0
Career total			91	0	3	0	0	0	94	0

== Honors ==
=== Des Moines Menace ===
- USL Premier Development League National Champions (1): 2005

=== Columbus Crew ===
- Major League Soccer MLS Cup (1): 2008
- Major League Soccer Supporter's Shield (2): 2008, 2009

== See also ==
- List of select Jewish football (association; soccer) players
