= 2012 MLS SuperDraft =

College draft for soccer teams

General information
- Sport: Soccer
- Date: January 12, 2012
- Time: 12:00 p.m. (ET)
- Location: Kansas City, Missouri
- Network: ESPN2

Overview
- 38 total selections
- First selection: Andrew Wenger, Montreal Impact
- Most selections: 5 teams (3 selections)
- Fewest selections: 5 teams (1 selection)

The 2012 MLS SuperDraft was the thirteenth annual SuperDraft presented by Major League Soccer. It was held on January 12, 2012 at 12:00 p.m. (ET). The draft was reduced from three rounds to two with the 19 MLS clubs selecting a total of 38 players. The expansion Montreal Impact had the first overall selection.

== Changes from 2011 ==
- As an expansion club, Montreal received the first pick in the SuperDraft.
- The SuperDraft was contracted from three rounds to two rounds, making it the shortest SuperDraft in terms of rounds.

== Selection order ==
The official selection order was set by Major League Soccer on October 21, 2011:

1. 2012 expansion team Montreal Impact received the first selection;
2. The eight clubs which did not qualify for the playoffs received picks #2 through #9 (in reverse order of season points);
3. The two clubs eliminated in the Wild Card round of playoffs received picks #10 and #11 (in reverse order of season points);
4. The four clubs eliminated in the Conference Semifinals received picks #12 through #15 (in reverse order of season points);
5. The two clubs eliminated in the Conference Finals received picks #16 and #17 (in reverse order of season points);
6. The club which lost the 2011 MLS Cup received pick #18;
7. The club which won the 2011 MLS Cup received pick #19.

This selection order held for both rounds of the MLS SuperDraft. The same order was followed for the 2012 MLS Supplemental Draft, which was held on January 17, 2012.

*	Denotes player who has been selected for an MLS Best XI team

=== Round 1 ===
Any player marked with a * is part of the Generation Adidas program.

Pick #	MLS team	Player	Position	Affiliation
1	Montreal Impact	(United States) *Andrew Wenger	Forward	Duke University
2	Vancouver Whitecaps FC	(Jamaica) *Darren Mattocks	Forward	University of Akron
3	New England Revolution	(United States) *Kelyn Rowe	Midfielder	UCLA; Washington Crossfire
4	Toronto FC	(United States) Luis Silva	Midfielder	UC Santa Barbara; Orange County Blue Star
5	Chivas USA	(United States) Casey Townsend	Forward	University of Maryland
6	San Jose Earthquakes	(United States) *Sam Garza	Forward	UC Santa Barbara
7	D.C. United	(United States) Nick DeLeon	Midfielder	University of Louisville; Arizona Sahuaros
8	Portland Timbers	(Haiti) *Andrew Jean-Baptiste	Defender	University of Connecticut
9	Chicago Fire	(United States) Austin Berry	Defender	University of Louisville; Chicago Fire Premier
10	Columbus Crew	(United States) Ethan Finlay	Midfielder	Creighton University; Chicago Fire Premier
11	FC Dallas	(United States) Matt Hedges	Defender	University of North Carolina-Chapel Hill; Reading United AC
12	Toronto FC (Note: #12: New York Red Bulls → Toronto FC. 1 April 2011: Toronto FC acquired this first-round selection, midfielder Tony Tchani, and defender Danleigh Borman from New York Red Bulls in exchange for midfielder Dwayne De Rosario.)	(United States) Aaron Maund	Defender	University of Notre Dame; Indiana Invaders
13	Philadelphia Union	(United States) *Chandler Hoffman	Forward	UCLA; Orange County Blue Star
14	Colorado Rapids	(United States) Tony Cascio	Midfielder	University of Connecticut
15	Seattle Sounders FC	(United States) Andrew Duran	Defender	Creighton University; Des Moines Menace
16	Sporting Kansas City	(England) *Dom Dwyer	Forward	University of South Florida
17	Real Salt Lake	(Uruguay) *Enzo Martinez	Midfielder	University of North Carolina-Chapel Hill
18	Houston Dynamo	(United States) Colin Rolfe	Forward	University of Louisville
19	Los Angeles Galaxy	(United States) Tommy Meyer	Defender	Indiana University; Chicago Fire Premier

=== Round 2 ===
Any player marked with an * is part of the Generation Adidas program.

Pick #	MLS team	Player	Position	Affiliation
20	Montreal Impact	(Scotland) Calum Mallace	Midfielder	Marquette University; Chicago Fire Premier
21	Vancouver Whitecaps FC	(United States) Chris Estridge	Defender	Indiana University; Chicago Fire Premier
22	New England Revolution	(United States) *Tyler Polak	Defender	Creighton University; Chicago Fire Premier
23	Chicago Fire (Note: #23: Toronto FC → Chicago Fire. 28 July 2011: Chicago Fire acquired this second-round selection and defender Dan Gargan from Toronto FC in exchange for defender Dasan Robinson.)	(Zimbabwe) Lucky Mkosana	Forward	Dartmouth College; Michigan Bucks
24	Real Salt Lake (Note: #24: Chivas USA → Real Salt Lake. 6 April 2010: Real Salt Lake acquired a conditional 2012 SuperDraft pick, which became this pick, from Chivas USA in exchange for the rights to defender Dario Delgado.)	(Brazil) Diogo de Almeida	Defender	Southern Methodist University
25	San Jose Earthquakes	(United States) Jacob Hustedt	Midfielder	University of Washington; Ventura County Fusion
26	Columbus Crew (Note: #26: D.C. United → Columbus Crew. 6 August 2010: Columbus Crew acquired this second-round selection from D.C. United in exchange for defender Jed Zayner and a fourth-round selection in the 2011 MLS SuperDraft (which was converted to a first-round selection in the 2011 MLS Supplemental Draft).)	(United States) Aubrey Perry	Defender	University of South Florida
27	Portland Timbers	(United States) Brendan King	Midfielder	University of Notre Dame; Chicago Fire Premier
28	Chicago Fire	(United States) Hunter Jumper	Defender	University of Virginia
29	Columbus Crew	(Trinidad and Tobago) Kevan George	Midfielder	University of Central Florida
30	Sporting Kansas City (Note: #30: FC Dallas → Sporting Kansas City. 9 March 2010: Sporting Kansas City acquired this second-round selection from FC Dallas in exchange for goalkeeper Kevin Hartman.)	(Cameroon) Cyprian Hedrick	Defender	Coastal Carolina University; Fresno Fuego
31	New York Red Bulls	(United States) Ryan Meara	Goalkeeper	Fordham University; Jersey Express
32	Philadelphia Union	(United States) Greg Jordan	Midfielder	Creighton University
33	San Jose Earthquakes (Note: #33: Colorado Rapids → San Jose Earthquakes. 7 April 2010: San Jose Earthquakes acquired this second-round selection from Colorado Rapids in exchange for forward Quincy Amarikwa.)	(United States) Chris Blais	Goalkeeper	University of South Florida
34	Seattle Sounders FC	(Canada) Babayele Sodade	Forward	University of Alabama-Birmingham; Michigan Bucks
35	Philadelphia Union (Note: #35: Sporting Kansas City → Philadelphia Union. 30 June 2010: Philadelphia Union acquired this second-round selection, a second-round selection in the 2011 MLS SuperDraft, and allocation money from Kansas City Wizards in exchange for defender Shavar Thomas.)	(United States) Ray Gaddis	Defender	West Virginia University; Reading United
36	Real Salt Lake	(Colombia) Sebastián Velásquez	Midfielder	Spartanburg Methodist College
37	Houston Dynamo	(United States) Warren Creavalle	Midfielder	University of Central Florida; Carolina Dynamo
38	Los Angeles Galaxy	(United States) Kenney Walker	Midfielder	University of Louisville; Chicago Fire Premier

=== Round 3 and round 4 trades ===
Prior to the reduction of the 2012 SuperDraft to two rounds, trades were made which involved SuperDraft Round 3 and Round 4 selections. These selections were converted into 2012 MLS Supplemental Draft Round 1 and Round 2 selections.

== Other draft day trades ==
- Portland Timbers traded forward Kenny Cooper to New York Red Bulls in exchange for a first-round pick in the 2013 MLS SuperDraft and allocation money.

== Notable undrafted players ==
=== Homegrown players ===
Original MLS team	Player	Position	College	Conference	Notes
Colorado Rapids	Dillon Serna	Midfielder	Akron	MAC	
