= Olman Vargas =

Costa Rican footballer (born 1985)

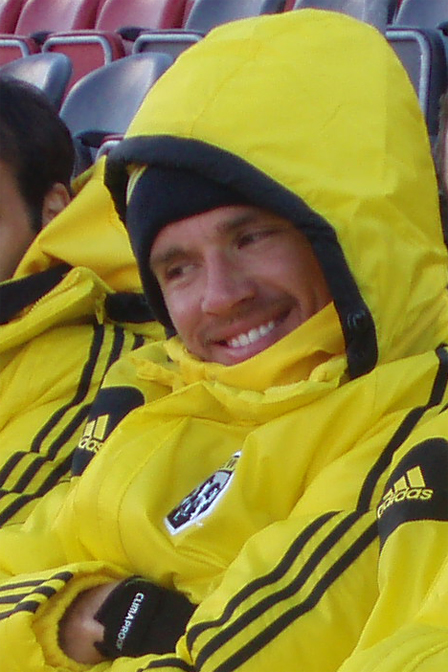
- Vargas with Columbus Crew in 2012

Personal information
- Full name: Olman Andrés Vargas López
- Date of birth: April 15, 1985 (age 41)
- Place of birth: San José, Costa Rica
- Height: 1.83 m (6 ft 0 in)
- Position: Forward

Team information
- Current team: La U Universitarios
- Number: 21

Senior career*
| Years | Team | Apps | (Gls) |
| 2005–2007 | Ramonense | | |
| 2007–2009 | Carmelita | 38 | (14) |
| 2009–2012 | Saprissa | 11 | (2) |
| 2010 | → Brujas (loan) | 12 | (1) |
| 2010–2011 | → Herediano (loan) | 53 | (19) |
| 2012 | Columbus Crew | 11 | (1) |
| 2013–2014 | Herediano | 22 | (5) |
| 2014 | → Universidad (loan) | 13 | (3) |
| 2015 | Antigua | 21 | (2) |
| 2015–2016 | UCR | 54 | (18) |
| 2017–2019 | Carmelita | 86 | (18) |
| 2019– | La U Universitarios | 2 | (1) |

International career
| 2012 | Costa Rica | 2 | (1) |
- * Club domestic league appearances and goals as of 21:27, 4 August 2019 (UTC)

Olman Andrés Vargas López (born April 15, 1985) is a Costa Rican footballer who currently plays for La U Universitarios.

== Club career ==
A tall striker, Vargas began his career with Ramonense, before moving to Carmelita where he scored 14 goals in 38 matches. While at Carmelita, Vargas was noticed by storied First Division club Deportivo Saprissa and joined the club for the 2009–10 season. He made 11 league appearances for Saprissa and netted 2 goals. He was then loaned to Brujas FC for the second half of the 2009–10 season. He appeared in 12 matches for Brujas only scoring 1 goal. In 2010, he was sent on loan to C.S. Herediano, and helped guide his new club into the 2010 Apertura playoffs and the final of the 2011 Apertura where it lost to Alajuelense in a penalty shootout. While with Herediano the striker netted 19 goals in 53 league appearances.

On January 6, 2012, Vargas was signed to a multi-year contract by Columbus Crew of Major League Soccer.

On March 24, 2012, Vargas scored his first goal in the MLS, a header coming of a cross from left back Shaun Francis.

On November 20, 2012, Vargas was released by the Columbus Crew. He signed with Herediano at the beginning of 2013, but left them for Universidad in summer 2014. In December 2014 he signed for Guatemalan side Antigua de Guatemala.

Ahead of the 2019/20 season, Vargas joined La U Universitarios.

== International career ==
Vargas made his debut for Costa Rica in an April 2012 friendly match against Honduras in which he immediately scored. He won his second and final cap in a June 2012 FIFA World Cup qualification match against El Salvador.

=== International goals ===
Scores and results list Costa Rica's tally first.

| No | Date | Venue | Opponent | Score | Result | Competition |
|---|---|---|---|---|---|---|
| 1. | 11 April 2012 | Estadio Nacional de Costa Rica, San Jose, Costa Rica | Honduras | 1–1 | 1–1 | Friendly |

== Personal life ==
Vargas has been engaged to model Tasha Hines since September 2013.
