= Carl Woszczynski =

American soccer player

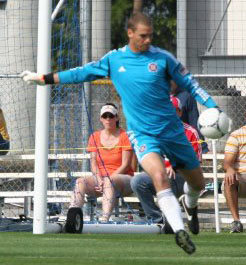
- Carl Woszczynski in 2012.

Personal information
- Full name: Carl Matthew Woszczynski
- Date of birth: April 18, 1988 (age 38)
- Place of birth: Columbus, Indiana, United States
- Height: 6 ft 5 in (1.96 m)
- Position: Goalkeeper

Youth career
- 2003–2007: Fort Wayne Fever

College career
Years	Team	Apps	(Gls)
2007–2011	UAB Blazers		

Senior career*
Years	Team	Apps	(Gls)
2007–2008	Indiana Invaders	15	(0)
2009–2010	Atlanta Blackhawks	19	(0)
2012	Atlanta Silverbacks Reserves	4	(0)
2012–2013	Los Angeles Blues	16	(0)
2014	Orlando City	5	(0)
2015–2019	Phoenix Rising	87	(0)
- * Club domestic league appearances and goals as of October 27, 2019

Carl Matthew Woszczynski (born April 18, 1988) is an American former professional soccer player.

== Playing career ==
Woszczynski attended Columbus North High School in Columbus, Indiana, where he was a four-year varsity starting goalkeeper. He recorded 42 career shutouts in 80 varsity starts. During his time there, he was a four-time All-Conference Indiana selection and three-time All State selection, as well as The Republic’s Area Player of the Year in 2006.

Woszczynski played club soccer with the Fort Wayne Fever, where he was an Indiana State Cup Champion in 2007. He also was a seven-time member of the Indiana State ODP Team, a two-time captain of that team, and was selected to the Region II pool twice.

=== College and amateur ===
Woszczynski played college soccer for the University of Alabama at Birmingham from 2007 to 2011, where he was recognized as one of the best goalkeepers to come through Conference USA. He holds the record for the best single-season goals-against-average in school history. He was also named Conference USA Defensive Player of the Week eight times in his career, which is the most in Conference USA and University of Alabama at Birmingham history. Woszczynski was a three-time All-Conference USA honoree. His senior year, he was named to both the College Soccer News National Team of the Week and Soccer America National Team of the Week on separate occasions. Woszczynski was also selected as a candidate for the Lowe’s Senior CLASS Award, and an NSCAA 3rd Team Academic All-American in 2011.

During his collegiate career, Woszczynski played four seasons in the USL Premier Development League, including two with the Indiana Invaders, and two with the Atlanta Blackhawks. He began the 2012 season with the Atlanta Silverbacks Reserves and played in four games.

=== Professional ===
Woszczynski was drafted in the first round (53rd overall) in the 2012 MLS Supplemental Draft by the Chicago Fire of Major League Soccer. He was the 3rd overall goalkeeper drafted. After spending the 2012 preseason with the Fire, he was released without a contract offer. Woszczynski then spent time during the season with the Columbus Crew filling in for an injured goalkeeper.

From there, Woszczynski signed with the Los Angeles Blues of the USL Professional Division. He made his debut on July 14, 2012, against Antigua Barracuda, where he earned the 2–0 win. He was subsequently named USL Honorable Mention Team of the Week for his performance in goal.

Woszczynski signed with Orlando City on November 4, 2013. He was released upon the conclusion of the 2014 season, a casualty of the club's transition to Major League Soccer. On November 19, Woszczynski signed with Arizona United SC. In the 2015 season, he led Arizona United in minutes played while captaining the team. He also set the USL single season record for saves in a season (130).
