= Jamie Finch =

American soccer player

Personal information
- Full name: Jamie Alan Finch
- Date of birth: February 26, 1989 (age 37)
- Place of birth: Bellevue, Washington, United States
- Height: 1.75 m (5 ft 9 in)
- Position: Defender

Youth career
- 1999–2003: FC Alliance
- 2003–2005: Eastside FC
- 2005–2007: Emerald City FC
- 2008–2011: Washington Huskies

Senior career*
Years	Team	Apps	(Gls)
2009–2010	Washington Crossfire^{[A]}	25	(0)
2012	Carolina RailHawks	3	(0)
- * Club domestic league appearances and goals as of September 26, 2012

Jamie Alan Finch (born February 26, 1989) is an American soccer player.

== Early career ==
=== High School & Youth ===
Finch graduated from Inglemoor High School in Kenmore, Washington in 2007. During his stint at Inglemoor, Finch was a two-year letterwinner, Seattle Times' first-team all-state selection as a senior, shared King-Co Co-MVP honors with former UW Husky teammate Taylor Mueller and was named to Seattle Post-Intelligencer All-Area Team in 2007. He helped lead Inglemoor to three straight 4A State Tournament appearances including a third-place finish in 2005 and a fourth-place finish in 2007.

Finch also played club soccer for FC Alliance (1999–2003), Eastside FC (2003–2005) and Emerald City FC (2005–2007). He led Emerald City FC to a quarter final finish at the 2007 Regionals in Las Vegas, Nevada, a second-place finish at 2006 Regionals in Boise, Idaho and a first-place at the 2005 Nomads Thanksgiving Tournament in San Diego, California.

=== College and amateur ===
Following his high school and youth career, Finch committed to the University of Washington. However, he redshirted during his freshman year in 2007 due to injury. On August 29, 2008, Finch made his collegiate debut for the Huskies in a 2–1 loss to Fairleigh Dickinson University in the season opener. He made a total of 16 appearances and tallied two assists in his redshirt freshman season and was also named to the Pac-10 All-Academic First-Team.

In 2009, Finch was named to the Pac-10 All-Academic First-Team for the second straight year and was also named All-Pac-10 Honorable Mention. On November 8, 2009, Finch scored his first collegiate goal for the Huskies in a 2–1 loss to UCLA.

In his junior year in 2010, Finch was one of three Huskies to start all 18 games for the team and tallied two assists during the campaign. Finch went on to be named All-Pac-10 Honorable Mention, Pac-10 All-Academic First-Team, NSCAA Scholar All-West Region and First-Team Academic All-District VIII.

In his final season of his collegiate career, Finch appeared in all 18 games, tallied five assists and led the Husky backline that recorded nine shutouts during the regular season. In the final regular season game, Finch recorded two assists in the Huskies 3–0 win over Oregon State University. The First assist came when he set up Jacob Hustedt for his sixth of the season and the second came off a corner kick to Casey McCool. The Huskies finished 12-4-2 on the year, which is usually good enough to make the NCAA Tournament, but they were left out.

During his time in college, Finch spent two seasons with the Washington Crossfire^{[A]} in the USL Premier Development League.

== Professional career ==
On January 17, 2012, Finch was drafted in the second round of the 2012 MLS Supplemental Draft (29th overall) by the Columbus Crew. However, he did not sign a contract with them. On May 18, 2012, Finch joined NASL club Carolina RailHawks. His debut didn't come until July 22 when he came on as a sub in the 77th minute of Carolina's 1–0 win over Minnesota Stars FC.

== Statistics ==
Club performance			League		Cup		League Cup		Total	
Season	Club	League	Apps	Goals	Apps	Goals	Apps	Goals	Apps	Goals
USA			League		Open Cup		League Cup		Total	
2009	Washington Crossfire^{[A]}	USL Premier Development League	12	0	—		2	0	14	0
2010	Washington Crossfire^{[A]}	USL Premier Development League	13	0	—		—		13	0
2012	Carolina RailHawks	North American Soccer League	3	0	0	0	0	0	3	0
Total	USA		28	0	0	0	2	0	30	0
Career total			28	0	0	0	2	0	30	0

== Notes ==
A. ^{a} ^{b} ^{c} The club was known as the Seattle Wolves in 2009.
