= Kevan George =

Trinidadian footballer

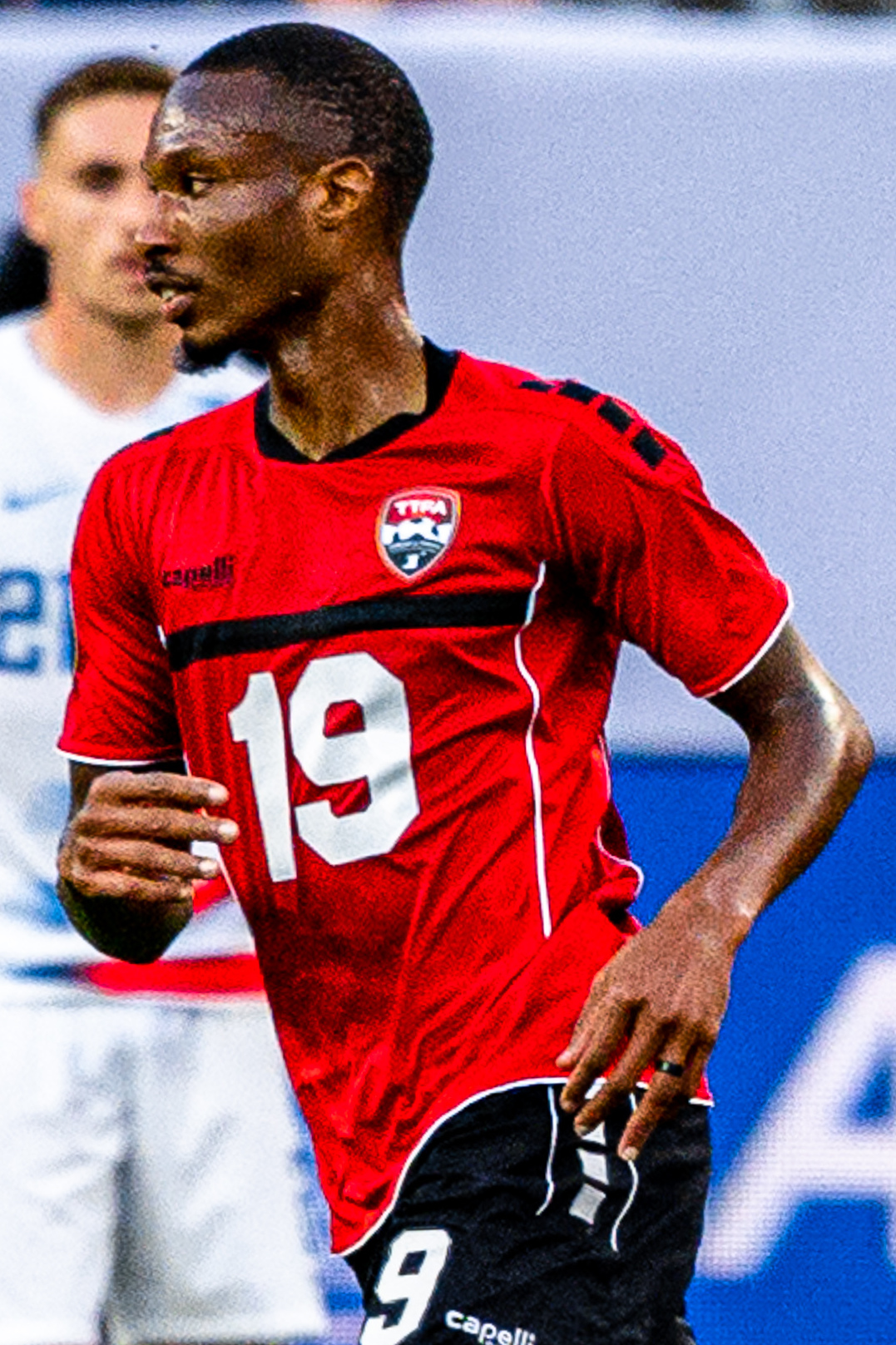
- George with Trinidad and Tobago at the 2019 CONCACAF Gold Cup

Personal information
- Full name: Kevan Leon George
- Date of birth: 30 January 1990 (age 36)
- Place of birth: Roxborough, Trinidad and Tobago
- Height: 6 ft 2 in (1.88 m)
- Position: Defensive midfielder

College career
Years	Team	Apps	(Gls)
2008–2011	UCF Knights	73	(6)

Senior career*
Years	Team	Apps	(Gls)
2009	Central Florida Kraze	2	(0)
2012–2015	Columbus Crew SC	28	(0)
2014	→ Dayton Dutch Lions (loan)	7	(0)
2016–2017	Jacksonville Armada	55	(0)
2018–2020	Charlotte Independence	42	(3)

International career^{‡}
2012	Trinidad and Tobago U23	3	(0)
2013–2019	Trinidad and Tobago	50	(0)
- * Club domestic league appearances and goals as of 22 April 2022 ‡ National team caps and goals as of 22 April 2022

Kevan Leon George (born 30 January 1990) is a Trinidadian former footballer who played as a midfielder.

== Career ==
=== Youth and college ===
George played on the collegiate level at University of Central Florida between 2008 and 2011. In four seasons at Central Florida, he totaled six goals and 16 assists in 73 games. He was named to the All-Conference USA First Team three times (2008, 2010, 2011).

=== Professional ===
George was drafted by the Columbus Crew in the second round (29th pick overall) of the 2012 MLS SuperDraft. He made his professional debut on 26 May 2012 in a 2–1 victory over Chicago Fire.

George possesses a United States green card which qualifies him as a domestic player for MLS roster purposes.

On 10 April 2016, George joined Jacksonville Armada FC of the North American Soccer League.

George moved to United Soccer League side Charlotte Independence on 29 January 2018.
