= Irakli Khutsidze =

Georgian footballer

Irakli Khutsidze ირაკლი ხუციძე
Personal information
- Date of birth: 16 April 1990 (age 36)
- Place of birth: Kutaisi, Georgia
- Height: 5 ft 9 in (1.75 m)
- Positions: Defensive midfielder; defender

Team information
- Current team: Dayton Dutch Lions
- Number: 7

Youth career
- 2007–2009: FC Ameri Tbilisi

Senior career*
Years	Team	Apps	(Gls)
2009–2010	Baia Zugdidi	7	(1)
2010–2012	FC Gagra	35	(3)
2013–	Dayton Dutch Lions	40	(0)

International career^{‡}
2008	Georgia U19	1	(0)
2009	Georgia U21		
- * Club domestic league appearances and goals as of 21:25, 6 August 2015 (UTC) ‡ National team caps and goals as of 8 July 2013

Irakli Khutsidze (Georgian: ირაკლი ხუციძე; born 16 April 1990) is a Georgian footballer who plays as a midfielder for the Dayton Dutch Lions of the USL Pro.

== Career ==
=== Club ===
Born in Kutaisi, from 2007 to 2009, Khutsidze worked his way through the ranks at FC Ameri Tbilisi. He appeared for the first team during the 2008–2009 season, scoring 4 goals in 27 matches. At the time, Ameri played in the Pirveli Liga, Georgia's second division. In 2009, Khutsidze was signed to the senior squad of Baia Zugdidi of the Georgian Premier League. Khutsidze played in 7 league matches and scored 1 goal during his year with the club. The following season, Khutsidze signed for FC Gagra, also of the Georgian Premier League. In 2011, he captained the team, helping the club become league champions and qualifying them to compete in 2011–12 UEFA Europa League qualifying. Khutsidze played in both of Gagra's matches in the tournament but the team was ultimately eliminated from qualification 2–3 on aggregate by Anorthosis Famagusta F.C. of Cyprus. In June 2012, Khutsidze trialed with and appeared in a reserve league match for the Columbus Crew of Major League Soccer despite offers to play in Ukraine.

After not being signed by the Crew, Khutsidze returned to Gagra. On 4 February 2013, it was announced that Khutsidze's contract with FC Gagra had been terminated by mutual consent. It was then announced on 10 April 2013 that Khutsidze had signed for the Dayton Dutch Lions of the USL Pro, the third division of United States soccer league system for the 2013 season. On 20 April 2013, Khutsidze made his debut for Dayton in the opening game of the season, a 2–1 victory over the Pittsburgh Riverhounds. Khutsidze finished the 2013 USL Pro season with a total of 25 league appearances, tallying three assists.

On 24 March 2014, it was announced that Khutsidze had re-signed with the Dutch Lions for the 2014 USL Pro season. Following the season, Khutsidze re-signed with Dayton as they self-relegated to the Premier Development League after making 35 USL professional appearances for the club.

=== International ===
In 2009, Khutsidze appeared in a U21 friendly against Belarus. Khutsidze was part of Georgia's squad for qualification for the 2011 UEFA European Under-19 Football Championship.
