= Julius James =

Trinidadian footballer (born 1984)

Personal information
- Date of birth: 9 July 1984 (age 42)
- Place of birth: Maloney Gardens, Trinidad and Tobago
- Height: 6 ft 0 in (1.83 m)
- Position: Defender

Youth career
- 2003: St. Anthony's College
- 2004–2007: Connecticut Huskies

Senior career*
Years	Team	Apps	(Gls)
2006	Westchester Flames	3	(0)
2008	Toronto FC	13	(1)
2009	Houston Dynamo	8	(0)
2009	→ Minnesota Thunder (loan)	2	(0)
2009–2010	D.C. United	31	(2)
2011–2012	Columbus Crew	43	(1)
2013	Carolina RailHawks	16	(0)
2014–2015	San Antonio Scorpions	32	(1)
2016	Fort Lauderdale Strikers	20	(0)
2017	Central FC	2	(0)
2017	Sacramento Republic	7	(0)
2018–2019	FC Motown	12	(2)
Total		189	(7)

International career
2001	Trinidad and Tobago U17	40	(0)
2008–2011	Trinidad and Tobago	16	(0)
- * Club domestic league appearances and goals

Julius James (born 9 July 1984) is a Trinidadian former footballer.

== Career ==
=== College ===
James played college soccer for the University of Connecticut, and was a 2007 Hermann Trophy candidate and Lowe's Senior CLASS Award finalist.

=== Professional ===
James drafted 9th overall in the 2008 MLS SuperDraft by Toronto FC, and played with them during their 2008 preseason, but suffered a shoulder injury against the New York Red Bulls and missed his side's first two matches of the 2008 regular season. He recovered to make the bench for Toronto's first win of the season against the Los Angeles Galaxy, and scored on his MLS debut, also against Galaxy.

James was traded to Houston Dynamo on 12 December 2008 as part of the deal that took Dwayne De Rosario to Toronto FC. On 14 August 2009, after a short loan period at Minnesota Thunder in the USL First Division, James was traded to D.C. United in exchange for a third-round pick in the 2012 MLS SuperDraft. On 11 September 2010 James scored his 2nd goal for DC in a 1–0 away win vs. his old team Toronto.

On 17 February 2011, D.C. United waived James.

On 28 February 2011, Columbus Crew announced that they had signed James. He made his debut on the next day as a second-half substitute in the second leg of the Crew's CONCACAF Champions League quarter-final series against Real Salt Lake. He played his first league game with the Crew on 19 March 2011 against his former team, D.C. United, in their 2011 MLS season opener.

James signed a multi-year contract extension with Columbus on 6 July 2011.

After the conclusion of the 2012 season, Columbus declined the 2013 option on James's contract and he entered the 2012 MLS Re-Entry Draft. James became a free agent after he went undrafted in both rounds of the draft.

James signed with Carolina RailHawks of the North American Soccer League (NASL) for the 2013 season. On 1 March 2014, James signed with San Antonio Scorpions of NASL. He re-signed with San Antonio on 9 January 2015.

Following the 2015 NASL season, the Scorpions suspended operations. On 27 January 2016, James signed with the Fort Lauderdale Strikers. He retired from football after playing for FC Motown.

=== International ===
James played for the Trinidad and Tobago Under-17 Team that traveled to Brazil, Haiti, and the United States, and took part in the 2001 FIFA U-17 World Championship, where they suffered a 6–1 defeat to Brazil in the group stage. He earned his first senior cap for Trinidad and Tobago national football team against Guyana on 3 September 2008.

== Personal ==
James was a resource economics major at the University of Connecticut. He now resides in Fort Lauderdale, FL and is an elite soccer coach for International Miami CF Academy. He is married with one child.
