= Aubrey Perry =

American soccer player (born 1991)

Personal information
- Full name: Aubrey Perry
- Date of birth: January 20, 1991 (age 35)
- Place of birth: Ocoee, Florida, United States
- Height: 5 ft 9 in (1.75 m)
- Position: Defender

Team information
- Current team: Gräsö Norrskedika IF
- Number: 3

Youth career
- 2006–2008: IMG Soccer Academy

College career
Years	Team	Apps	(Gls)
2008–2011	South Florida Bulls	83	(0)

Senior career*
Years	Team	Apps	(Gls)
2012	Columbus Crew	0	(0)
2013	Gimo IF		
2014–2014	BKV Norrtälje	9	(0)
2014–2017	MD FF Köping	1	(0)
2017–	Gräsö Norrskedika IF		

International career^{‡}
2006–2008	United States U17	16	(0)
2008	United States U18	4	(0)
2007	United States U20	1	(0)
- * Club domestic league appearances and goals as of May 29, 2012 ‡ National team caps and goals as of February 13, 2013

Aubrey Perry (born January 20, 1991) is an American soccer player who currently plays for Gräsö Norrskedika IF.

== Career ==
=== Youth and college ===
Perry played on the collegiate level at the University of South Florida. Perry is a 2011 All-Big East Conference Third Team and is the USF's all-time leader in games played and games started.

=== Professional ===
Perry was drafted by the Columbus Crew in the second round (26th pick overall) of the 2012 MLS SuperDraft.

Perry made his first professional appearance in a US Open Cup game against Dayton Dutch Lions on May 29, 2012.

Perry was waived by Columbus on June 27, 2012.

He played for BKV Norrtälje in Sweden, and went on to play for MD FF Köping.

In addition to playing professionally, Perry coaches soccer privately through one-on-one training session for players in Ocoee, FL area.
