= William Hesmer =

American soccer player (born 1981)

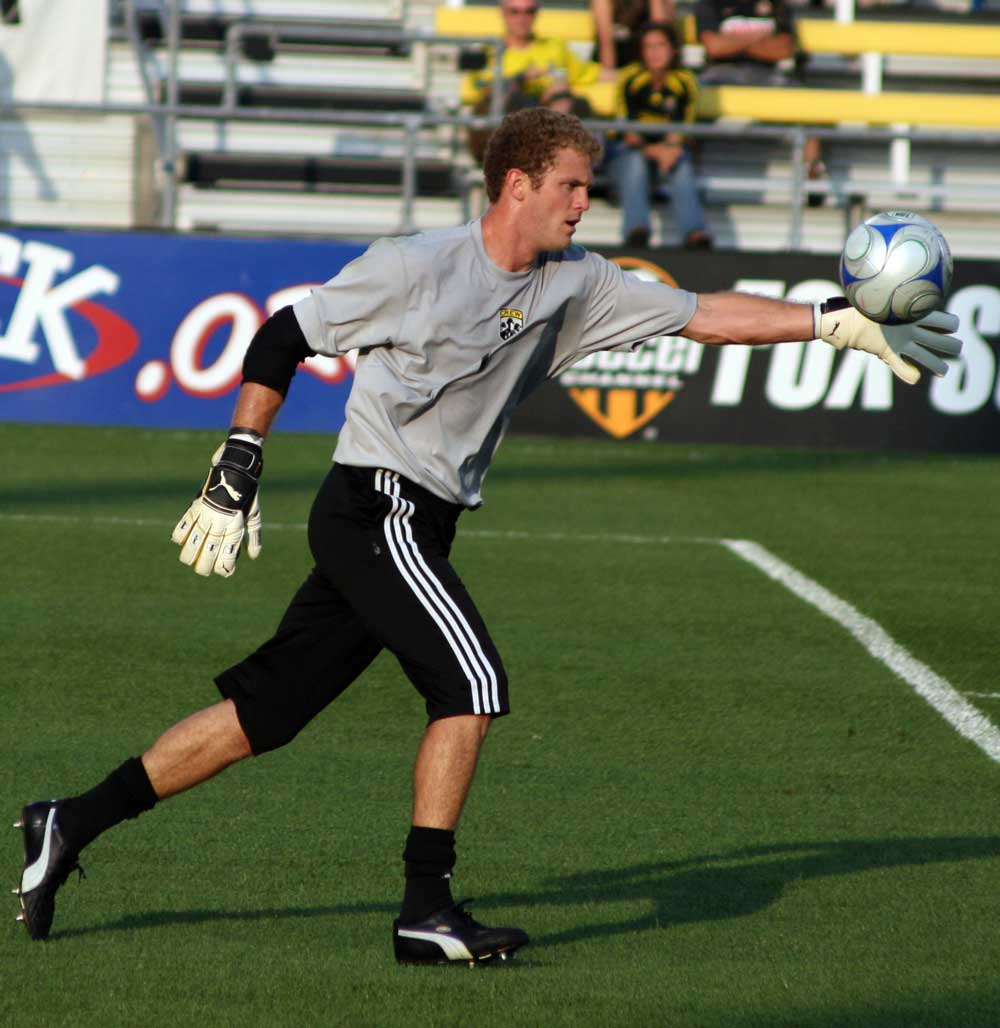
- Hesmer with Columbus Crew in 2008

Personal information
- Full name: William Russell Hesmer Jr.
- Date of birth: November 23, 1981 (age 44)
- Place of birth: Wilson, North Carolina, United States
- Height: 6 ft 2 in (1.88 m)
- Position: Goalkeeper

Youth career
- Wilson YSA Diplomats
- Knightsdale Blast
- –2000: Charlotte Soccer Club

College career
Years	Team	Apps	(Gls)
2000–2003	Wake Forest Demon Deacons	55	(0)

Senior career*
Years	Team	Apps	(Gls)
2004–2006	Kansas City Wizards	3	(0)
2004	→ Richmond Kickers (loan)	1	(0)
2007–2012	Columbus Crew	130	(1)
2014	Carolina Railhawks	0	(0)
Total		134	(1)
- * Club domestic league appearances and goals

William Russell Hesmer Jr. (born November 23, 1981) is an American former professional soccer player who played as a goalkeeper.

== Early career and college ==
Born in Wilson, North Carolina, Hesmer played soccer at Hunt High School as "an all-state center midfielder" until his senior year, where he played as a goalkeeper. He played club soccer strictly as a goalkeeper, and won a U12 state title in 1992 as well as a Region III title in 2000. He then played college soccer at Wake Forest University from 2000 to 2003. Coming in as a freshman, Hesmer overcame an early-season injury to start Wake’s final three regular-season games and made an impact in the ACC Tournament, stopping three penalties in a shootout win over Clemson and earning All-Tournament honors. The following year, he helped Wake Forest record seven shutouts and reach the ACC Semifinals. In the quarterfinal against Duke, he saved two penalty kicks to help Wake Forest advance. As a junior and senior, Hesmer served as team captain and earned All-American recognition. His junior season saw him post nine shutouts and receive first-team All-ACC honors. A late-season collision brought Hesmer’s senior campaign to an early end, as a thigh injury that required surgery kept him out of the ACC and NCAA Tournaments.

== Professional ==
After graduating from college, Hesmer was drafted 17th overall in the 2004 MLS SuperDraft by Kansas City Wizards. However, with Tony Meola starting in goal, and the very experienced Bo Oshoniyi as his backup, Hesmer was not able to establish himself, and finished the MLS season without playing a single minute, although he did take to the field – for one single minute in a game against Rochester Raging Rhinos – during a brief loan spell with the Richmond Kickers in the A-League.

During the 2005 season, he appeared in two U.S. Open Cup matches for the Wizards.

In the 2006 season, Hesmer made three appearances, but did not make an impact on the first team. He won and earned a shutout in his debut league game versus the Columbus Crew. He was selected in the 2006 MLS Expansion Draft by Toronto FC, but was only with the club for a matter of hours before being dealt to the Columbus Crew for a partial allocation. The 2007 season saw Hesmer establish himself as the first team goalkeeper for the Crew, as he started 20 matches for the Columbus club.

In the 2008 season, Hesmer stopped penalty kicks in each of the Crew's first two matches, as well as a third against New England on May 8. He was the starting goalkeeper for the 2008 MLS Cup championship team, winning the trophy on his birthday.

He became the club's all-time shutout leader by earning his 26th in a 1–0 triumph over Kansas City Wizards on May 23, 2010.

Hesmer became the third goalkeeper in MLS history to score a goal in a 2–2 draw with Toronto FC at BMO Field on October 16, 2010. With the Crew trailing 2–1 in second-half stoppage time, he sprinted to the center of the Toronto FC penalty area as an extra attacker while an Eddie Gaven corner kick was in mid-flight. The ball was headed by Chad Marshall back to Hesmer, who was given enough time to trap, set and fire it into the net.

A fractured right shoulder resulting from a collision with Danny Califf in the 85th minute of a 3–1 victory over Philadelphia Union in the regular season finale at Columbus Crew Stadium on October 24, 2010, forced Hesmer to miss the playoffs.

He made his 100th league appearance for the Crew on March 26, 2011, keeping a clean sheet in a 0–0 tie with New York Red Bulls.

An ankle sprain suffered during the first day of preseason training, sidelined Hesmer to begin the 2012 season. During the rehabilitation period, he made what would be his final appearance in the Black & Gold, starting and playing the first half for the Crew reserves in a 2–1 loss to the Montreal Impact reserves, following the Crew senior squad's home opener on March 24, 2012, at Columbus Crew Stadium. In April, Hesmer was forced to undergo surgery on his right hip, which had been initially injured three years earlier, costing him the remainder of the season. At the end of the year, Columbus declined his 2013 contract option and Hesmer chose to enter the 2012 MLS Re-Entry Draft. Hesmer ended his Columbus career with the most shutouts in Crew history with 45 across all competitions.

On December 14, 2012, he was selected by Los Angeles Galaxy in stage two of the draft. Despite being selected, Hesmer didn't sign with the Galaxy and opted to retire on February 19, 2013.

Will was signed to a one-day contract with the Carolina Railhawks as a backup goalkeeper for their June 24, 2014, U.S. Open Cup match against the LA Galaxy.

== Personal life ==
His post-career plans involved working in wealth management for Raymond James in Raleigh, North Carolina.

== Honors ==
Columbus Crew

- MLS Cup: 2008
- Supporter's Shield: 2008, 2009
