= Crossfire Redmond =

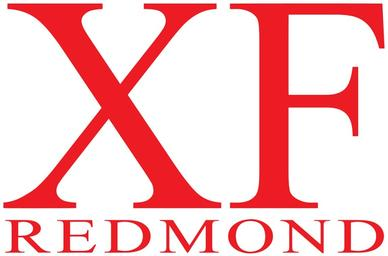
- Nicknames: The Burn, XF
- Founded: 2002 (as Seattle Wolves)
- Ground: Redmond High School; Redmond, Washington
- Capacity: 2,000
- Owners: Steve Hopps; Lance Mclntosh
- Manager: Bernie James
- League: NPSL
- 2019: Northwest Conference: 1st
- Website: www.crossfiresoccer.org
Home colors	Away colors

Crossfire Redmond, previously the Seattle Wolves and Washington Crossfire, is an American soccer organization based in Seattle, Washington, United States. Founded in 2009, the team plays in the National Premier Soccer League, the fourth tier of the American Soccer Pyramid, and was formerly in the Premier Development League (PDL) through the 2016 season.

The team plays its home games in the stadium on the campus of Redmond High School in nearby Redmond, Washington, where they played since 2011. The team's colors are red, black and white.

Prior to 2010 the team was known as the Seattle Wolves, and had competed in the Pacific Coast Soccer League (PCSL) and PDL under that name for several years. The Wolves and the Washington Crossfire youth soccer organization merged in November 2009. The larger Washington Crossfire youth organization, which was formed in 1968, has been instrumental in developing young soccer players in the Washington area for over 30 years, and is Washington state's only Nike Premier Club. It also fields boys' and girls' teams under the Elite Clubs National League, and previously the U.S. Soccer Development Academy, as Crossfire Premier.

== History ==
Following their establishment in 2002, the original Seattle Wolves burst into the Northwest football scene, quickly moving up four divisions of competitive play within the Greater Seattle Soccer League (GSSL). Since the team's beginning, the Wolves have captured 12 League Titles and 5 tournament championships. In the fall of 2006, the club grew out of its infancy as a local amateur team, and expanded to include multiple squads competing in the Starfire Premier Soccer League (SPSL) and several regional semi-professional leagues.

In 2008, the Wolves undertook their first competitive season in the Pacific Coast Soccer League, one of the three national competitions considered to be at the fourth level of the American Soccer Pyramid. They finished their first season in the PCSL in third place behind champions Victoria United.

On January 26, 2009, the Wolves announced that they would be fielding a new senior team in the USL Premier Development League for the 2009 season, thereby becoming the second team to make a PCSL to PDL expansion, following Vancouver Whitecaps Residency in 2008. They were one of four expansion teams in the NW Division of 2009 PDL season along with the Victoria Highlanders, Portland Timbers U23s, and Kitsap Pumas.

On January 31, 2009, the Wolves competed against the Seattle Sounders FC Super search squad at Starfire Sports Complex in Tukwila. The Wolves prepared a special roster for the specific game, composed of current Wolves players, ex professional players, ex Seattle Sounders (USL) players, current and ex collegiate players, and current youth players. The televised game showed clips of the game the following day on NBC King 5 after the Super Bowl.

In their first season in PDL competition the Wolves fielded a strong squad that included former Los Angeles Galaxy player Ely Allen. They won their first ever competitive PDL game 4–1 over the Yakima Reds on May 8, 2009, off the back of a brace by Fernando Monge, and continued their winning form throughout the early games, picking up victories over Spokane Spiders and the Portland Timbers U23's. Despite strong opposition in the ultra-competitive Northwest Division the Wolves proved to be one of the best teams in the division; they enjoyed an excellent 5-game unbeaten streak in June, coming from behind to beat Vancouver Whitecaps Residency 2–1, enjoying solid victories over Yakima and the Abbotsford Mariners, and scoring a controversial last minute penalty kick equalizer to tie 2–2 with Tacoma Tide. In fact the only team Seattle couldn't beat were the Kitsap Pumas, who won both their regular season games on tight 2–1 and 2–0 scorelines, and ended up topping the division. The Wolves gained a crucial point with another last minute equalizer in a 3–3 tie with the Victoria Highlanders in early July, and finished the regular season with three more victories, including an impressive 3–0 result on the road against Cascade Surge. The Wolves eventually finished third in the division, qualifying for the playoffs at the first attempt; their opponent in the Divisional First round was Portland Timbers U23's, who they beat 3–2 in an amazing game which saw Portland lead 1–0, and then 2–1, only for Seattle striker Alex Chursky to hit two goals in the last ten minutes and send the Wolves through to the divisional final. Unfortunately for the Wolves, Kitsap again stood in their way, and the men from Bremerton completed a hat trick of wins with a 2–0 victory, ending the Wolves' playoff run. Casey Cunningham and Ely Allen were the Wolves' top scorers, with 7 and 6 goals respectively, while Allen also contributed six assists.

In November 2009, the team merged with the Washington Crossfire youth soccer organization, creating a new soccer team branded as the Washington Crossfire.

Following the 2016 PDL season, the team sold its team rights to a group in Vancouver, Canada. Crossfire did not return for the 2017 PDL season while a new team, TSS FC Rovers, began play in the Northwest Division. After two years of inactivity, Crossfire Premier announced it would be fielding a team in the National Premier Soccer League (NPSL) for the 2019 season. The team, re-named "Crossfire Redmond," was officially announced by the league on December 18, 2018.

The team won its first league trophy when it won the NPSL Northwest Conference and reached a league playoff for the first time since 2012. Despite falling in the West Region Semifinals, the team's season result earned it a berth in the 2020 U.S. Open Cup.

== Year-by-year ==
Year	League	Regular season	Playoffs	Open Cup
2008	PCSL	3rd		did not qualify
2009	USL PDL	3rd, Northwest	Divisional Finals	Ineligible
2010	USL PDL	5th, Northwest	did not qualify	did not qualify
2011	USL PDL	7th, Northwest	did not qualify	did not qualify
2012	USL PDL	4th, Northwest	Conference Quarter-Finals	did not qualify
2013	USL PDL	6th, Northwest	did not qualify	did not qualify
2014	USL PDL	6th, Northwest	did not qualify	did not qualify
2015	USL PDL	6th, Northwest	did not qualify	did not qualify
2016	USL PDL	3rd, Northwest	did not qualify	did not qualify
2017	On Hiatus			
2018	On Hiatus			
2019	NPSL	1st, Northwest	Regional semifinals	Ineligible
2020	NPSL	Season cancelled due to COVID-19 pandemic		

== Honors ==
- John F. Kennedy Trophy
  - Winners: 2008
- NPSL Northeast Conference
  - Champions: 2019

=== Notable former players ===
This list of notable former players comprises players who went on to play professional soccer after playing for the team in the Premier Development League, or those who previously played professionally before joining the team.

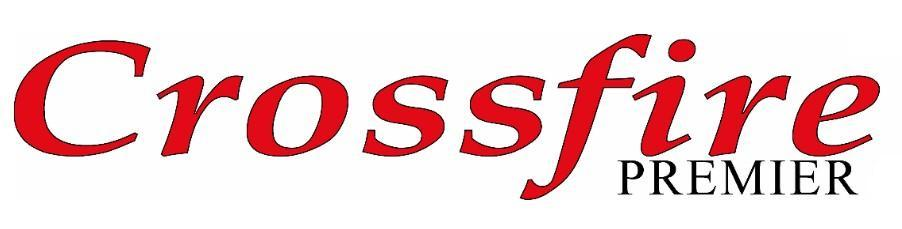
Alternate Crossfire Redmond logo

- (United States) Ely Allen
- (United States) Gibson Bardsley
- (United States) Ethan Bartlow
- (United States) Nikolas Besagno
- (United States) Jordan Burt
- (United States) Jason Cascio
- (United States) Ben Dragavon
- (United States) Jamie Finch
- (Guam) Doug Herrick
- (United States) Adam Jahn
- (England) Adam Nowland
- (United States) Noah Merl
- (United States) Tommy Meyer
- (United States) Brayton Knapp
- (United States) Brian Perk
- (United States) Cristian Roldan
- (England) Andy Rose
- (United States) Kelyn Rowe

== Head coaches ==
- (England) Alex Weaver (2008)
- (United States) Seth Spidahl (2009–2011)
- (England) Adam Nowland (2012–2013)
- (United States) Nik Besagno (2014)
- (United States) Billy Wiskel (2015)
- (England) Bernie James (2016, 2019–)

== Stadiums ==
- Starfire Sports Complex; Tukwila, Washington (2008–2009)
- Interbay Stadium; Seattle, Washington (2010)
- Stadium at Lake Washington High School; Kirkland, Washington 1 game (2011)
- Stadium at Redmond High School; Redmond, Washington (2011–2016, 2019–present)

== Average attendance ==
- 2009: 376
- 2010: 158
- 2011: 66
- 2012: 102
- 2013: 128
- 2014: 113
- 2015: 131
