= Eddie Gaven =

American soccer player (born 1986)

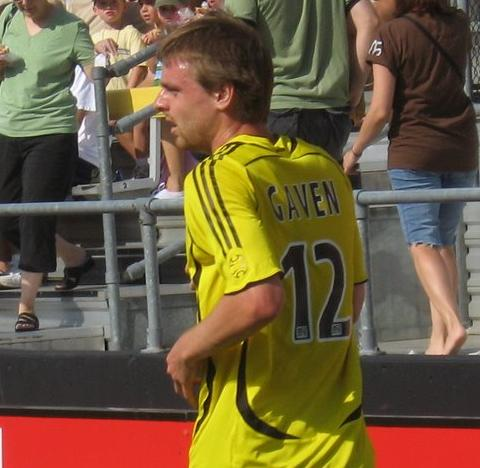
- Gaven in 2007

Personal information
- Date of birth: October 25, 1986 (age 39)
- Place of birth: Hamilton Township, New Jersey, U.S.
- Height: 1.83 m (6 ft 0 in)
- Position: Midfielder

Youth career
- 2001–2003: IMG Soccer Academy

Senior career*
Years	Team	Apps	(Gls)
2003–2005	MetroStars	69	(16)
2006–2013	Columbus Crew	209	(35)
Total		278	(51)

International career^{‡}
2003	United States U17	4	(0)
2005	United States U20	1	(0)
2003–2008	United States U23	5	(1)
2004–2010	United States	8	(0)

Managerial career
- 2016–2022: Ave Maria Gyrenes
- * Club domestic league appearances and goals as of October 31, 2013 ‡ National team caps and goals as of October 31, 2013

Eddie Gaven (born October 25, 1986) is an American former soccer player who played 11 seasons in Major League Soccer, primarily with the Columbus Crew. In July 2012, Gaven became the youngest player to play in 250 MLS matches at 25 years and 257 days old.

== Early life ==
Gaven was born in Hamilton Township, New Jersey, and attended Steinert High School. He did not play college soccer; instead, Gaven spent two years training with other young Americans at the USSF's Bradenton Academy.

== Professional career ==
At the time of signing his contract, Gaven became the youngest player to sign with MLS. At the age of 16 years and two months, Gaven was drafted by the MetroStars with the twelfth overall pick in the 2003 MLS SuperDraft. He became the youngest player in team history on his debut on June 14, 2003, against Chicago and became the youngest player in team history to score a goal, which he did in just his second game, against D.C. United on July 5. With the game tied at two, Metro coach Bob Bradley used a loophole in MLS's substitution rules, which allowed a fourth substitution in a game but only for a goalkeeper. Bradley first exchanged the playing positions of Metro goalie Tim Howard and midfielder Mark Lisi, then substituted Gaven into goal for Lisi as the fourth "goalkeeper only" sub. After only 10 seconds of play, the ball went out of play and Gaven and Howard switched places, with Gaven moving to midfield and Howard back into goal. Gaven then went on to score the game-winner in overtime. In the process, Gaven became the youngest goalkeeper in MLS history. The goalkeeper fourth-substitution rule was eliminated after the season, largely due to the outcry following Gaven's goal.

After becoming an automatic starter and coming into his own with the MetroStars in 2004, Gaven became the youngest player ever voted in to start the MLS All-Star Game, finished the MLS season with seven goals and seven assists, and became the youngest player in league history to be named to the MLS Best XI.

Gaven ended the 2005 MLS season with eight goals and four assists. Just before the 2006 season, Gaven was traded to Columbus Crew along with the rights to defender Chris Leitch for striker Edson Buddle. With the Crew, Gaven played nearly every game in 2006, scoring four goals. In 2007, he appeared in 27 games for Columbus scoring five goals and tallying seven assists. Gaven's 2008 season resulted in lower output, three goals and two assists, due in part to starting the season injured. In the Eastern Conference Championship game, Gaven propelled the Crew into their first MLS Cup Final with a game-winning goal; the Crew went on to win the Final.

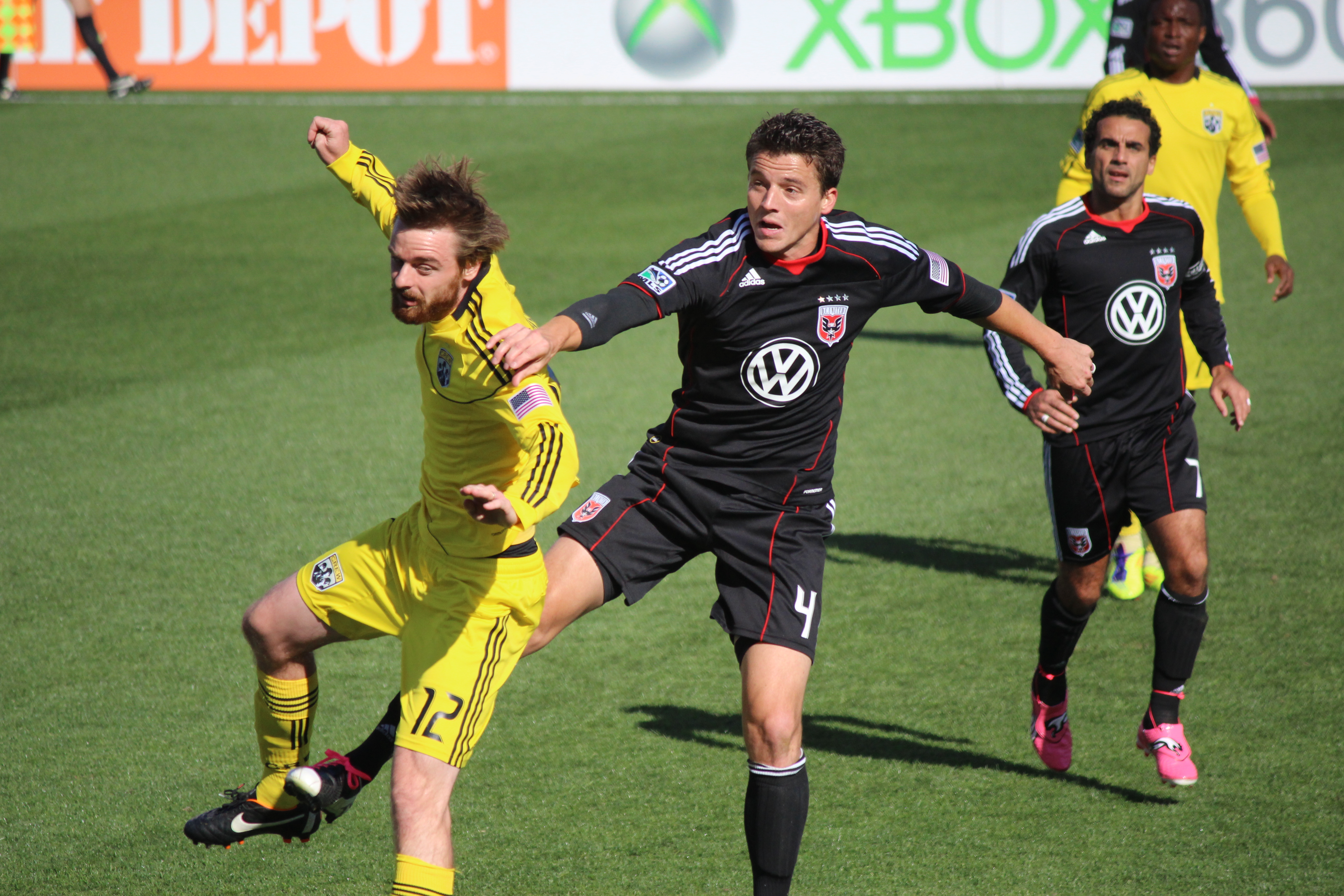
Gaven competes for a header with Marc Burch during a 2011 regular season match at Columbus Crew Stadium

During the 2010 MLS season in a game against the Philadelphia Union, Gaven was forced to play in goal for the second time in his MLS career after goalkeeper William Hesmer went out of the game with a shoulder injury. The Crew had used all three substitutions prior to Hesmer's injury. Gaven was scored on by Sebastian LeToux during the final minutes of the game, but made two saves to help the Crew win the game 3–1. Gaven would go on to win MLS Save of the Week honors for one of the saves.

Gaven signed a contract extension for two years plus option years with Columbus on November 14, 2011.

Gaven missed most of the 2013 season after an injury suffered during a Lamar Hunt U.S. Open Cup match. He retired following the 2013 season.

== International career ==
Gaven played every minute for the U.S. in the 2003 Under-17 World Championship in Finland. He then became the youngest player (17 years 104 days) in CONCACAF history to appear in an Olympic qualifier when he played for the U.S. Under-23 team in a 2–0 victory over Canada on February 5, 2004. He then became the fourth youngest player in US history to get his a senior cap, doing so in a 1–1 against Poland on July 11, 2004.

In 2005, after continuing his solid play with the MetroStars, Gaven was part of the U.S. Under-20 team at the 2005 FIFA World Youth Championship in the Netherlands.

== Coaching career ==
Following his retirement from soccer in 2013, he moved to Ave Maria University as Head Men's Soccer Coach from March 2016 through 2022.

== Personal life ==
Gaven is a devout Catholic.

== Career statistics ==
Appearances and goals by club, season and competition
Club	Season	League		MLS Cup Playoffs		U.S. Open Cup		SuperLiga		Champions League		Total	
Club	Season	Apps	Goals	Apps	Goals	Apps	Goals	Apps	Goals	Apps	Goals	Apps	Goals
MetroStars	2003	12	1	2	0	1	0	–				14	1
MetroStars	2004	29	7	2	0			–				31	7
MetroStars	2005	26	8	2	0			–				28	8
Columbus Crew	2006	30	4	0	0			–				30	4
Columbus Crew	2007	27	5	–		1	0	–		–		28	5
Columbus Crew	2008	24	3	4	1			2	0			30	4
Columbus Crew	2009	30	6	2	0	1	0	–		6	1	39	7
Columbus Crew	2010	28	3	2	0	4	1	–		2	0	36	6
Columbus Crew	2011	26	5	–		1	0	–		6	0	33	5
Columbus Crew	2012	34	9	–		–		–		–		34	9
Columbus Crew	2013	10	0	–		–		–		–		10	0
Career total		278	49	14	1	7	1	2	0	14	1	284	52

== Honors ==
MetroStars

- MLS Best XI: 2004

Columbus Crew

- Major League Soccer MLS Cup: 2008
- Major League Soccer Supporter's Shield: 2008, 2009
