= Emilio Rentería =

Venezuelan footballer (born 1984)

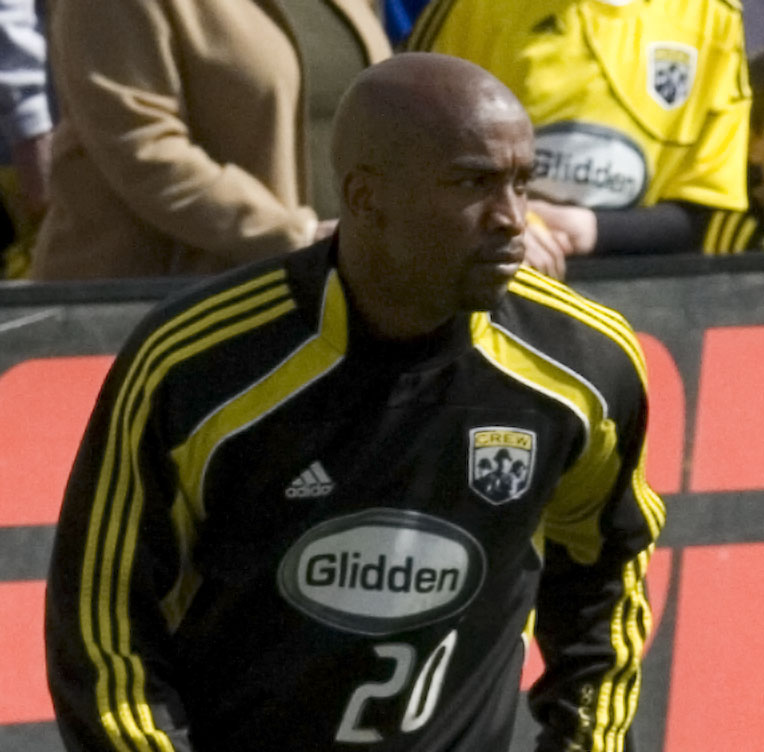
- Rentería in 2010

Personal information
- Full name: Emilio Rentería
- Date of birth: October 9, 1984 (age 42)
- Place of birth: Caracas, Venezuela
- Height: 5 ft 9 in (1.75 m)
- Position: Forward

Youth career
- 2000–2001: Caracas
- 2001–2003: Levante B

Senior career*
Years	Team	Apps	(Gls)
2003–2004	Levante	2	(0)
2004–2005	Deportivo Italia	31	(12)
2005–2007	UA Maracaibo	18	(4)
2007–2009	Caracas	53	(9)
2009–2012	Columbus Crew	69	(16)
2013	Defensor Sporting	9	(1)
2013	Carabobo	15	(5)
2014	Caracas	9	(0)
2014–2015	San Marcos de Arica	26	(6)
2015–2016	Ñublense	28	(4)
2016	Monagas	17	(2)
2017	Metropolitanos	32	(2)
2018–2021	Academia Puerto Cabello	62	(9)
2022	Atlético Pantoja		
2023-2025	CD Buñol		

International career^{‡}
	Venezuela U17	7	(2)
	Venezuela U20	4	(0)
2007–2014	Venezuela	8	(0)
- * Club domestic league appearances and goals as of 27 February 2018 (UTC) ‡ National team caps and goals as of 27 February 2018 (UTC)

Emilio Rentería García (born October 9, 1984) is a Venezuelan footballer as a forward.

== Career ==
=== Club ===
Rentería began his professional career in Spain, where he competed in the Spanish second division with Levante UD from 2001 to 2004. He then returned to his homeland to compete in the Venezuelan first division, first with Deportivo Italia, where he scored 12 goals during the 2004–2005 season. Rentería then joined UA Maracaibo, where he totaled 14 goals in two seasons (2005–2007), while also helping lead his side to two appearances in the Copa Libertadores, the most prestigious club competition in South America.

Rentería played for Caracas FC of the Venezuelan top flight from 2007 to 2009. He tallied 16 goals in that span, while once again helping his club to two appearances in Copa Libertadores, including a run to the quarterfinals in 2009, the club's best-ever finish in that competition.

Rentería joined Columbus Crew on August 19, 2009, and made his first appearance for the Black and Gold on September 20, 2009, playing the final three minutes of a league match against the Chicago Fire. During 2010/2011 Renteria was able to break into the starting 11 and prove his worth for the Columbus Crew. His first goal of the season came on May 20, 2010 versus the NY Red Bulls when he stole a pass to defender Tim Ream and scored unassisted. On July 17, 2010, Renteria scored yet another goal in Columbus Crew's match against Red Bulls during a 2–0 victory. Renteria ended the Crew's 245-minute scoreless streak in the 20th minute. On July 24, 2010, Renteria scored a gift goal in the first half versus Houston Dynamo. Renteria's contract was not picked up following the 2012 season.

On 21 February 2013, Rentería signed a new contract with Uruguayan side Defensor Sporting.

=== International ===
Rentería has also represented the Venezuela National Team at the Under-17, U-20, U-23 and Senior levels, totaling 19 total goals at the youth levels and three goals with the senior team in friendly matches.

== Honours ==
Levante

- Segunda División: 2003–04
