= 2014 Columbus Crew season =

Columbus Crew
2014 season
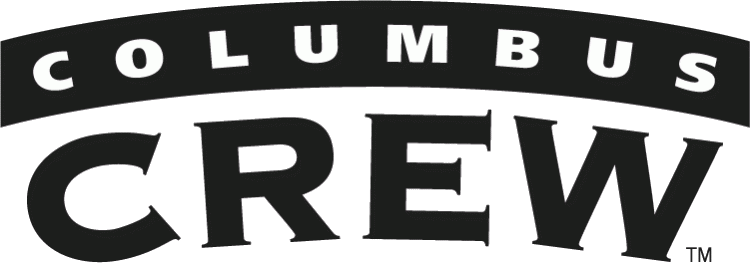
- Investor-operators: Anthony Precourt
- Head Coach: Gregg Berhalter
- Stadium: Columbus Crew Stadium
- Major League Soccer: Conference: 3rd Overall: 7th
- MLS Cup playoffs: Conference semifinals
- U.S. Open Cup: Fifth round
- Top goalscorer: League: Federico Higuaín (11); All: Federico Higuaín (12)
- Highest home attendance: 21,318 (9/20 v. NE)
- Lowest home attendance: 1,913 (6/17 v. IND)
- Average home league attendance: 15,978 (79.3%)
- Biggest win: DC 0-3 CLB (3/8); CLB 4–1 LA (8/16); CLB 3–0 HOU (8/23); CLB 3–0 CHV (9/7)
- Biggest defeat: NY 4-1 CLB (7/12)
Home colors	Away colors

The 2014 Columbus Crew season was the club's 19th season of existence and their 19th consecutive season in Major League Soccer, the top flight of soccer in the United States and Canada. The first match of the season was on March 8 against D.C. United. It was the first season under head coach Gregg Berhalter.

== Review ==
The 2014 season was a significant break from the past, particularly off the field. New owner Anthony Precourt, having purchased the team from Hunt Sports Group midway through 2013, made his presence felt often through the year. The team enjoyed its best performance in several years, including an appearance in the playoffs for the first time in three years. Gregg Berhalter was handed the helm, serving both as head coach and sporting director. He was joined by a trio of assistant coaches that included fellow World Cup veteran Josh Wolff, and longtime MLS goalkeeper Pat Onstad.

Columbus started the season with three consecutive victories, including a road win over Seattle Sounders FC. This torrid beginning then cooled dramatically as Columbus won only one of their next 16 games. Dominic Oduro, the leading scorer from the previous year, was dealt to Toronto while Jairo Arrieta likewise struggled to make an impact. Defensively a pair of new Costa Rican signings, Giancarlo Gonzalez and Waylon Francis, missed significant time due to Costa Rica's run to the quarterfinals of the World Cup. The defensive changes could have been more drastic, however, as Michael Parkhurst was left off the American squad.

A handful of players emerged in the latter half of the season, however, leading the team to a dramatic turnaround and ultimately a postseason berth. Federico Higuain was joined atop the scoring charts by third-year winger Ethan Finlay, with both ending the year with 11 goals and seven assists. Other significant players included the pairing of Tony Tchani and Wil Trapp at holding midfield and goalkeeper Steve Clark.

Ultimately, however, the team's quest for its first hardware since 2009 came up empty. It was eliminated from the U.S. Open Cup after two games, falling once again to the Chicago Fire. The mid season doldrums ruled the club out of contention for Supporters Shield (won dramatically on the last day of the season by Seattle). Finally, the team was comprehensively outplayed in the playoffs by the New England Revolution, defeated 7–3 on aggregate over a two-game series. The team finished their last playoff game with only nine players on the field after ejections to Ethan Finlay and Justin Meram.

Off the field, new owner Anthony Precourt made sweeping changes. Long-serving General Manager Mark McCullers left the organization in the spring, replaced by Andy Loughnane after a nationwide search. While there was widespread criticism of the team's new television contract with Time Warner Sportschannel Ohio, the team continued its success at the turnstile. Three years after team attendance plummeted to less than 12,000, the team enjoyed five sellout crowds during 2014 and finished the year with the highest total attendance in the history of Crew Stadium.

The most significant change, however, was the revelation of a new team identity. The team's logo, unchanged since 1996, was jettisoned in favor of a new design that tried to better reflect the team's relationship to central Ohio. The name of the team was also changed slightly, becoming Columbus Crew SC. These changes were nearly unanimously applauded, in sharp contrast to the reaction to a new MLS logo that was also unveiled during the course of the season.

== Roster ==
As of October 6, 2014

Note: Flags indicate national team as defined under FIFA eligibility rules; some limited exceptions apply. Players may hold more than one non-FIFA nationality.

No.	Pos.	Nation	Player
1	GK	USA	Steve Clark
2	DF	USA	Tyson Wahl
3	DF	USA	Josh Williams
4	DF	USA	Michael Parkhurst (Captain)
5	DF	AUT	Emanuel Pogatetz (INT)
6	MF	CMR	Tony Tchani
7	MF	VEN	Bernardo Añor (INT)
9	FW	IRQ	Justin Meram
10	FW	ARG	Federico Higuaín (INT; DP)
11	MF	USA	Daniel Paladini
12	MF	USA	Hector Jiménez
13	MF	USA	Ethan Finlay
14	DF	CRC	Waylon Francis (INT)

No.	Pos.	Nation	Player
16	DF	USA	Eric Gehrig
17	FW	USA	Ben Speas (HGP; SUP)
18	FW	USA	Aaron Schoenfeld
19	FW	CRC	Jairo Arrieta (INT)
20	MF	USA	Wil Trapp (HGP; SUP)
21	DF	USA	Chad Barson (HGP)
22	DF	USA	Ben Sweat (SUP)
24	DF	URU	Agustín Viana
25	MF	USA	Romain Gall (SUP)
28	GK	USA	Matt Lampson (HGP)
29	FW	USA	Adam Bedell (SUP)
30	MF	GHA	Fifi Baiden (INT; SUP)
31	DF	USA	Matt Wiet (HGP; SUP)

=== Out on loan ===
Note: Flags indicate national team as defined under FIFA eligibility rules; some limited exceptions apply. Players may hold more than one non-FIFA nationality.

No.	Pos.	Nation	Player
23	MF	TTO	Kevan George (on loan to Dayton Dutch Lions)
27	MF	USA	Ross Friedman (HGP; SUP) (on loan to Dayton Dutch Lions)
33	MF	USA	Matt Walker (HGP; SUP) (on loan to Dayton Dutch Lions)
41	GK	USA	Brad Stuver (SUP) (on loan to Dayton Dutch Lions)

== Technical Staff ==
Position	Staff
President, Precourt Sports Ventures	(United States) Dave Greeley
President of Business Operations	(United States) Andy Loughnane
Director of Soccer Operations	(United States) Asher Mendelsohn
Sporting Director/Head Coach	(United States) Gregg Berhalter
Assistant Coach	(Netherlands) Robert Maaskant
Assistant Coach	(United States) Josh Wolff
Assistant Coach	(Canada) Pat Onstad
Strength/Conditioning Coach	(United States) Brook Hamilton
Head Athletic Trainer	(United States) Craig Devine
Assistant Trainer	(United States) Steve Purcell
Director of Team Operations	(United States) Tucker Walther
Team Operations Assistant	(United States) Ron Meadors
Equipment Manager	(United States) John Velasco

Source: []

== Non-competitive ==
=== Preseason ===
The Crew started preseason in Columbus and played games in Florida before returning to Ohio. The Crew brought in the following trialists during training camp: Konrad Warzycha and Patrick Slogic.

Unsigned draft picks Ben Sweat, Fifi Baiden and Adam Bedell also joined the team for preseason.

February 5 Friendly	Columbus Crew	1–0	Malmö FF	Bradenton, FL
1:00 PM EST	Baiden (yellow card) 21'; Añor (yellow card) 27'; Arrieta 50'; Williams (yellow card) 76'	Report	Molins (yellow card) 90'	Stadium: IMG Academy

February 19 Walt Disney World Pro Soccer Classic	Columbus Crew	3–1	Toronto FC	Lake Buena Vista, FL
1:00 PM EST	Higuaín 10'; Williams 12'; Bedell 62'	Report	Wahl 14' (o.g.)	Stadium: ESPN Wide World of Sports Complex; Referee: Robert Sibiga; Assistant referees: Joe Fletcher; Mark Cohen; Fourth official: Mark Geiger

February 22 Walt Disney World Pro Soccer Classic	Philadelphia Union	0–1	Columbus Crew	Lake Buena Vista, FL
1:00 PM EST	Okugo (yellow card) 87'	Report	Añor (yellow card) 32'; Higuaín 87' (pen.); Finley (yellow card) 89'	Stadium: ESPN Wide World of Sports Complex; Referee: Ted Unkle; Assistant referees: Kevin Klingel; Oscar; Fourth official: Silvir Petreson

February 26 Walt Disney World Pro Soccer Classic	Orlando City	4–4	Columbus Crew	Lake Buena Vista, FL
6:00 PM EST	Ceren 30'; Molino 52'; Mbengue 82'; Chin 89'	Report	Gehrig (yellow card) 35'; Finley 43'; Finlay 77', (pen.), 90+'; Meram 86'	Stadium: ESPN Wide World of Sports Complex

March 1 Walt Disney World Pro Soccer Classic Championship	Columbus Crew	4–1	Sporting Kansas City	Lake Buena Vista, FL
7:00 PM EST	Trapp (yellow card) 18'; Arrieta 20'; Parkhurst (yellow card) 45'; Añor 69'; Meram 74'; Higuaín 84'	Report	Zusi (yellow card) 56'; Bieler 87'	Stadium: ESPN Wide World of Sports Complex

=== Midseason ===
March 12 Friendly	Columbus Crew	2–2	Notre Dame Fighting Irish	Westerville, OH
	Oduro; Bedell	Report	Goal	Stadium: Westerville Central High School

May 20 Friendly	Columbus Crew	2–0	Dayton Dutch Lions	West Carrollton, OH
7:00 PM EDT	Joel DeLass 1' (o.g.); Ethan Finlay 4'	Report		Stadium: Dayton Outpatient Center Stadium; Attendance: 1,082; Referee: Andrew Castel; Assistant referees: Cory Richardson; Brandon Artis; Fourth official: Maggie Short

July 23 Friendly	Columbus Crew	2–2	Crystal Palace F.C.	Columbus, OH
7:30 PM EDT	Bedell 15'; Paladini 80'	Report	Murray 36'; Gray 70'	Stadium: Columbus Crew Stadium

September 3 Friendly	Columbus Crew	5-1	Dayton Dutch Lions	Obetz, OH
	Speas, Iheanacho,,	Report	Goal	Stadium: Crew Training Center

September 30 Friendly	Columbus Crew	1–2	Indy Eleven	Obetz, OH
	George 2'	Report	25'; 74'	Stadium: Crew Training Center

== Competitive ==
=== Overview ===
Competition	First match	Last match	Starting round	Final position	Record							
Competition	First match	Last match	Starting round	Final position	Pld	W	D	L	GF	GA	GD	Win %
Major League Soccer	March 8, 2014	October 26, 2014	Matchday 1	7th	34	14	10	10	52	42	+10	41.18
MLS Cup Playoffs	November 1, 2014	November 9, 2014	Conference Semifinals	Conference Semifinals	2	0	0	2	3	7	−4	0.00
U.S. Open Cup	June 17, 2014	June 25, 2014	Fourth Round	Fifth Round	2	1	0	1	4	5	−1	50.00
Total					38	15	10	13	59	54	+5	39.47

Source: Competitions

=== MLS ===
==== Standings ====
===== Eastern Conference =====
Pos	Team	Pld	W	L	T	GF	GA	GD	Pts	Qualification
1	D.C. United	34	17	9	8	52	37	+15	59	Qualification for the conference semifinals
2	New England Revolution	34	17	13	4	51	37	+14	55	Qualification for the conference semifinals
3	Columbus Crew SC	34	14	10	10	52	42	+10	52	Qualification for the conference semifinals
4	New York Red Bulls	34	13	10	11	55	50	+5	50	Qualification for the knockout round
5	Sporting Kansas City	34	14	13	7	48	41	+7	49	Qualification for the knockout round

Source: MLS

===== Overall table =====
Pos	Team	Pld	W	L	T	GF	GA	GD	Pts	Qualification
5	New England Revolution	34	17	13	4	51	46	+5	55	
6	FC Dallas	34	16	12	6	55	45	+10	54	
7	Columbus Crew	34	14	10	10	52	42	+10	52	
8	New York Red Bulls	34	13	10	11	55	50	+5	50	
9	Vancouver Whitecaps FC	34	12	8	14	42	40	+2	50	Qualification for the CONCACAF Champions League

Source: MLS
Rules for classification: 1) points; 2) head-to-head record; 3) goal difference; 4) number of goals scored

==== Results summary ====
Overall								Home						Away					
Pld	Pts	W	L	T	GF	GA	GD	W	L	T	GF	GA	GD	W	L	T	GF	GA	GD
34	52	14	10	10	52	42	+10	9	4	4	27	15	+12	5	6	6	25	27	−2

Last updated: 19 October 2014
Source: Columbus Crew
Pld = Matches played; Pts = Points; W = Matches won; T = Matches tied; L = Matches lost; GF = Goals for; GA = Goals against; GD = Goal difference

==== Results by round ====
Round	1	2	3	4	5	6	7	8	9	10	11	12	13	14	15	16	17	18	19	20	21	22	23	24	25	26	27	28	29	30	31	32	33	34
Stadium	A	H	A	H	A	H	H	A	A	H	A	H	A	H	A	H	A	A	H	H	A	A	H	H	H	A	H	A	H	H	A	A	A	H
Result	W	W	W	L	D	D	D	L	L	L	D	W	L	D	D	D	D	L	L	W	W	D	L	W	W	L	W	D	W	W	L	W	W	W

Updated to match(es) played on October 26, 2014. Source:
A = Away; H = Home; W = Win; D = Draw; L = Loss

==== Match results ====
March 8 1	D.C. United	0–3	Columbus Crew	Washington, D.C.
7:00 PM EST	Neal (yellow card) 67'	Report	Arrieta 18'; Higuaín 27', (yellow card) 63', (goal) 90' (pen.); Tchani (yellow card) 39'; Trapp (yellow card) 43'; Francis (yellow card) 76'	Stadium: Robert F. Kennedy Memorial Stadium; Attendance: 13,840; Referee: Andres Pfefferkorn; Assistant referees: Yevgeniy Mednikov; Stefan McHardy; Fourth official: Marc Lawrence

March 22 2	Columbus Crew	2–1	Philadelphia Union	Columbus, OH
6:00 PM EDT	Añor 24', 45+2'; Higuaín (yellow card) 81'	Report	Fernandes 62'; Fabinho (yellow card) 74'	Stadium: Columbus Crew Stadium; Attendance: 17,517; Referee: Ted Unkel; Assistant referees: Jeff Hosking; Mike Kampmeinert; Fourth official: Chris Penso

March 29 3	Seattle Sounders FC	1–2	Columbus Crew	Seattle, WA
10:00 PM EDT	Cooper 22'; Traoré (red card) 58'; Azira (yellow card) 87'	Report	Jiménez (yellow card) 8'; Higuaín 59' (pen.); Trapp (yellow card) 68'; Meram 90+4'	Stadium: CenturyLink Field; Attendance: 38,469; Referee: Allen Chapman; Assistant referees: Jeff Muschik; Jeremy Hanson; Fourth official: Alejandro Mariscal

April 5 4	Columbus Crew	0–2	Toronto FC	Columbus, OH
6:00 PM EDT		Report	Bradley 11'; Bloom (yellow card) 34'; Nakajima-Farran 85'	Stadium: Columbus Crew Stadium; Attendance: 12,045; Referee: Ismail Elfath; Assistant referees: George Gansner; Jason White; Fourth official: Sorin Stoica

April 13 5	San Jose Earthquakes	1–1	Columbus Crew	Santa Clara, CA
3:00 PM EDT	Barklage (yellow card) 25'; Wondolowski 51'; Djaló (yellow card) 69'	Report	Añor (yellow card) 13'; González (yellow card) 15'; Higuaín 44'	Stadium: Buck Shaw Stadium; Attendance: 10,525; Referee: Kevin Stott; Assistant referees: Corey Rockwell; Anthony Vasoli; Fourth official: Daniel Radford

April 19 6	Columbus Crew	1–1	D.C. United	Columbus, OH
7:30 PM EDT	Oduro (yellow card) 18'; González (yellow card) 73'; Añor (red card) 81'; Jiménez 90'	Report	Espíndola 31'; Kitchen (yellow card) 67'	Stadium: Columbus Crew Stadium; Attendance: 11,437; Referee: Juan Guzmán; Assistant referees: Peter Balciunas; Mark Cahen; Fourth official: Robert Sibiga

April 26 7	Columbus Crew	1–1	New York Red Bulls	Columbus, OH
7:30 PM EDT	Tchani (yellow card) 5'; Arrieta 39' (pen.)	Report	Wright-Phillips (yellow card) 45+1', (goal) 66'	Stadium: Columbus Crew Stadium; Attendance: 18,026; Referee: Geoff Gamble; Assistant referees: George Gansner; Gianni Facchini; Fourth official: Edvin Jurisevic

May 4 8	Sporting Kansas City	2–0	Columbus Crew	Kansas City, KS
4:00 PM EDT	Peterson 10'; Olum (yellow card) 38'; Sinovic (yellow card) 68'; Feilhaber (yellow card) 90+2'; Bieler 90+5'	Report	Trapp (yellow card) 45' (yellow-red card) 81'; E.Finlay (yellow card) 86'; Tchani (yellow card) 87'	Stadium: Sporting Park; Attendance: 20,565; Referee: Ismail Elfath; Assistant referees: Frank Anderson; James Conlee; Fourth official: Fotis Bazakos

May 7 9	Houston Dynamo	1–0	Columbus Crew	Houston, TX
8:00 PM EDT	Bruin 50'; Creavalle (yellow card) 87'	Report	Añor (yellow card) 60'; Higuaín (yellow card) 61'; Paladini (yellow card) 80'	Stadium: BBVA Compass Stadium; Attendance: 15,030; Referee: Jorge Gonzalez; Assistant referees: Jeff Muschik; Eric Weisbrod; Fourth official: Ted Unkel

May 10 10	Columbus Crew	0–1	Vancouver Whitecaps FC	Columbus, OH
7:30 PM EDT	Tchani (yellow card) 38'; Trapp (yellow card) 53'	Report	Koffie (yellow card) 21'; Hurtado 37'; O'Brien (yellow card) 68'; Beitashour (yellow card) 90+3'	Stadium: Columbus Crew Stadium; Attendance: 14,495; Referee: Hilario Grajeda; Assistant referees: C.J. Morgante; Jason White; Fourth official: Younes Marrakchi

May 17 11	Portland Timbers	3–3	Columbus Crew	Portland, OR
10:30 PM EDT	Urruti 5'; Powell (red card) 34'; Johnson 80'; Fernández 85'	Report	Higuaín 14', 45+5'; Williams (yellow card) 34'; Clark (yellow card) 78'; Finlay 81'; Arrieta (yellow card) 85'	Stadium: Providence Park; Attendance: 20,814; Referee: Jose Carlos Rivero; Assistant referees: Fabio Tovar; Jeremy Hanson; Fourth official: Allen Chapman

May 24 12	Columbus Crew	2–0	Chicago Fire	Columbus, OH
7:30 PM EDT	Finlay 10'; Arrieta 25'; Higuaín (yellow card) 54'	Report	Amarikwa (yellow card) 57'; Ianni (yellow card) 81'	Stadium: Columbus Crew Stadium; Attendance: 15,290; Referee: Fotis Bazakos; Assistant referees: Greg Barkey; Richard Gamache; Fourth official: Edvin Jurisevic

May 31 13	Toronto FC	3–2	Columbus Crew	Toronto, ON
5:00 PM EDT	Defoe 21', 81' (pen.); Bendik (yellow card) 66'; Gilberto (yellow card) 77'; Bekker (yellow card) 80'; Henry 90+2', (yellow card) 90+4'	Report	Meram 18'; Parkhurst (yellow card) 39'; Viana (yellow card) 60', (goal) 65'; Wahl (yellow card) 83'	Stadium: BMO Field; Attendance: 22,591; Referee: Sorin Stoica; Assistant referees: George Gansner; Mark Cahen; Fourth official: Yusri Rudolf

June 4 14	Columbus Crew	1–1	Real Salt Lake	Columbus, OH
7:30 PM EDT	Gerhig (yellow card) 16'; Finlay 88'	Report	Gil 56'	Stadium: Columbus Crew Stadium; Attendance: 11,121; Referee: Baldomero Toledo; Assistant referees: Ian Anderson; Scott Kachmarik; Fourth official: Chris Penso

June 7 15	D.C. United	0–0	Columbus Crew	Landover, MD
7:00 PM EDT	Boswell (yellow card) 42'; Christian (yellow card) 78'	Report	Meram (yellow card) 88'; Gehrig (yellow card) 90+4'	Stadium: FedExField; Attendance: 53,267; Referee: Hilario Grajeda; Assistant referees: Bill Dittmar; James Conlee; Fourth official: Daniel Fitzgerald

June 29 16	Columbus Crew	0–0	FC Dallas	Columbus, OH
8:00 PM EDT		Report		Stadium: Columbus Crew Stadium; Attendance: 20,617; Referee: Jair Marrufo; Assistant referees: Adam Garner; Corey Parker; Fourth official: Chris Penso

July 4 17	Colorado Rapids	1–1	Columbus Crew	Commerce City, CO
9:30 PM EDT	Moor (yellow card) 30'; Sanchez (yellow card) 79'; O'Neill (yellow card) 90+1'	Report	Gehrig 59' (o.g.); Finlay 76'	Stadium: Dick's Sporting Goods Park; Attendance: 18,432; Referee: Geoff Gamble; Assistant referees: Chris Strickland; Jeff Hosking; Fourth official: Younes Marrakchi

July 12 18	New York Red Bulls	4–1	Columbus Crew	Harrison, NJ
7:00 PM EDT	Wright-Phillips 17'; Henry 45'; Sam 56', (yellow card) 89'; Robles (yellow card) 73'; Alexander 90+1'	Report	Bedell 39'; Añor (yellow card) 43' (red card) 85'; Tchani (yellow card) 84'	Stadium: Red Bull Arena; Attendance: 17,028; Referee: Ted Unkel; Assistant referees: Peter Manikowski; Bill Dittmar; Fourth official: Daniel Fitzgerald

July 16 19	Columbus Crew	1–2	Sporting Kansas City	Columbus, OH
7:30 PM EDT	Trapp (yellow card) 53' (yellow-red card) 89'; Igor Julião 69' (o.g.)	Report	Olum (yellow card) 34'; Sapong 43'; Collin (red card) 55'; Igor Julião (yellow card) 79'; Feilhaber 90+3'	Stadium: Columbus Crew Stadium; Attendance: 13,643; Referee: Edvin Jurisevic; Assistant referees: Anthony Vasoli; Eric Weisbrod; Fourth official: Kevin Terry Jr.

July 19 20	Columbus Crew	2–1	Montreal Impact	Columbus, OH
7:30 PM EDT	Añor 56', 75'	Report	Di Vaio 36'; Camara (yellow card) 70'	Stadium: Columbus Crew Stadium; Attendance: 21,112; Referee: David Gantar; Assistant referees: Greg Barkey; Gianni Facchini; Fourth official: Alan Kelly

July 26 21	New England Revolution	1–2	Columbus Crew	Foxborough, MA
7:30 PM EDT	Soares 50'; Caldwell (yellow card) 52'; Nguyen (yellow card) 90'	Report	Trapp (yellow card) 41'; Higuaín 43'; Finlay 84'	Stadium: Gillette Stadium; Attendance: 24,542; Referee: Alan Kelly; Assistant referees: Brian Dunn; Eric Weisbrod; Fourth official: Mark Kadlecik

August 2 22	Chicago Fire	1–1	Columbus Crew	Bridgeview, IL
8:30 PM EDT	Magee 37' (pen.); Segares (yellow card) 75'	Report	Higuaín 46'; González (yellow card) 50'; Francis (yellow card) 69'	Stadium: Toyota Park; Attendance: 14,332; Referee: Silviu Petrescu; Assistant referees: James Conlee; Mark Cahen; Fourth official: José Carlos Rivero

August 9 23	Columbus Crew	2–3	Toronto FC	Columbus, OH
7:30 PM EDT	Higuaín 45+2' (pen.); Meram 81'	Report	Gilberto 43'; Henry (yellow card) 53'; Osorio 59'; Moore 84'	Stadium: Columbus Crew Stadium; Attendance: 17,822; Referee: Marcos de Oliveira Marcelo; Assistant referees: Craig Lowry; Peter Manikowski; Fourth official: Mark Geiger

August 16 24	Columbus Crew	4–1	LA Galaxy	Columbus, OH
7:30 PM EDT	Meram 24'; Finlay 33'; Speas 75'; González 84'	Report	Zardes 49'	Stadium: Columbus Crew Stadium; Attendance: 20,729; Referee: Armando Villarreal; Assistant referees: Corey Parker; Adam Garner; Fourth official: Sorin Stoica

August 23 25	Columbus Crew	3–0	Houston Dynamo	Columbus, OH
7:30 PM EDT	Meram 35'; Bedell 59'; Schoenfeld 64'	Report	Ashe (yellow card) 61'; Ownby (yellow card) 79'	Stadium: Columbus Crew Stadium; Attendance: 17,551; Referee: Jose Carlos Rivero; Assistant referees: Sean Hurd; Kyle Atkins; Fourth official: Kevin Terry Jr.

August 30 26	Montreal Impact	2–0	Columbus Crew	Montreal, QC
7:30 PM EDT	Piatti (yellow card) 32', (goal) 40', 90+5'	Report	Tchani (yellow card) 34'; Trapp (yellow card) 81'; Francis (yellow card) 85'	Stadium: Stade Saputo; Attendance: 15,995; Referee: Juan Guzman; Assistant referees: Daniel Belleau; Joe Fletcher; Fourth official: Chris Penso

September 7 27	Columbus Crew	3–0	Chivas USA	Columbus, OH
3:00 PM EDT	Meram 52', 59'; Gehrig (yellow card) 69'; Añor 80'	Report	Jean-Baptiste (yellow card) 40'	Stadium: Columbus Crew Stadium; Attendance: 17,043; Referee: Geoff Gamble; Assistant referees: Greg Barkey; Brian Dunn; Fourth official: Kevin Terry Jr.

September 13 28	Houston Dynamo	2–2	Columbus Crew	Houston, TX
8:30 PM EDT	Schoenfeld 12' (o.g.); Barnes 38', (yellow card) 65'; García (yellow card) 45+2'; Sarkodie (yellow card) 87'	Report	Schoenfeld (yellow card) 35'; Trapp 48'; Finlay 54'; Añor (yellow card) 69'; Francis (yellow card) 90'	Stadium: BBVA Compass Stadium; Attendance: 20,807; Referee: Ricardo Salazar; Assistant referees: Kermit Quisenberry; Mark Cahen; Fourth official: Armando Villarreal

September 20 29	Columbus Crew	1–0	New England Revolution	Columbus, OH
7:30 PM EDT	Meram (yellow card) 23'; Wahl (yellow card) 39'; Higuaín 48', (yellow card) 72'; Gehrig (yellow card) 75'; Clark (yellow card) 90+2'	Report	Barnes (yellow card) 47'	Stadium: Columbus Crew Stadium; Attendance: 21,318; Referee: Ted Unkel; Assistant referees: Jeff Muschik; Kyle Longville; Fourth official: Sorin Stoica

September 27 30	Columbus Crew	2–0	Montreal Impact	Columbus, OH
7:30 PM EDT	Finlay 2', (yellow card) 67'; Tchani (yellow card) 49'; Higuaín 58' (pen.); Wahl (yellow card) 63'	Report	Gagnon-Laparé (yellow card) 56'; Ferrari (yellow card) 77'	Stadium: Columbus Crew Stadium; Attendance: 20,318; Referee: Sorin Stoica; Assistant referees: George Gansner; Jason White; Fourth official: Hilario Grajeda

October 4 31	New England Revolution	2–1	Columbus Crew	Foxborough, MA
7:30 PM EDT	Nguyen 20', (yellow card) 90+4'; José Gonçalves (yellow card) 41'; Soares (yellow card) 59'; Jones (yellow card) 64', (goal) 67'	Report	Finlay 25'; Francis (yellow card) 39' (yellow-red card) 70'; Schoenfeld (yellow card) 64'; Higuaín (yellow card) 90+3'	Stadium: Gillette Stadium; Attendance: 23,143; Referee: Jose Rivero; Assistant referees: Philippe Brière; Daniel Belleau; Fourth official: Daniel Fitzgerald

October 11 32	Philadelphia Union	2–3	Columbus Crew	Chester, PA
7:00 PM EDT	Cruz 68', (yellow card) 70'; Wenger 75'	Report	Finlay 78'; Meram 79'; Arrieta 83'; Barson (yellow card) 90+1'	Stadium: PPL Park; Attendance: 15,849; Referee: Mark Geiger; Assistant referees: C.J. Morgante; Greg Barkey; Fourth official: Jorge Gonzalez

October 19 33	New York Red Bulls	1–3	Columbus Crew	Harrison, NJ
3:00 PM EDT	Wright-Phillips (yellow card) 56'; Sam 58'; Olave (yellow card) 83'; Lozano (yellow card) 89'	Report	Schoenfeld 18', 80'; Finlay 34'; Jiménez (yellow card) 77'	Stadium: Red Bull Arena; Attendance: 20,681; Referee: Jose Rivero; Assistant referees: Craig Lowry; Brian Dunn; Fourth official: Jorge Gonzalez

October 26 34	Columbus Crew	2–1	Philadelphia Union	Columbus, OH
5:00 PM EDT	Arrieta 13'; Añor 90'	Report	Okugo (yellow card) 57'; Pfeffer 85'	Stadium: Columbus Crew Stadium; Attendance: 16,892; Referee: Ismail Elfath; Assistant referees: George Gansner; James Conlee; Fourth official: Mark Kadlecik

=== MLS Cup Playoffs ===
==== Conference Semifinals ====
November 1 Leg 1	Columbus Crew	2–4	New England Revolution	Columbus, OH
4:00 PM EDT	Meram 64'; Francis (yellow card) 70'; Añor (yellow card) 90+1'; Higuaín 90+4' (pen.)	Report	Gonçalves (yellow card) 19'; Davies 34', 78'; Tierney 51'; Nguyen 70'	Stadium: Columbus Crew Stadium; Attendance: 9,040; Referee: Drew Fischer; Assistant referees: Joe Fletcher; Claudiu Badea; Fourth official: Fotis Bazakos

November 9 Leg 2	New England Revolution	3–1 (7–3 agg.)	Columbus Crew	Foxborough, MA
5:00 PM EST	Nguyen 43'; Gonçalves 55'; Bunbury 77'	Report	Finlay (red card) 61'; Meram (yellow card) 66' (yellow-red card) 85'; Tchani 69'	Stadium: Gillette Stadium; Attendance: 20,184; Referee: Armando Villarreal; Assistant referees: Peter Manikowski; Corey Parker; Fourth official: Chris Penso

=== U.S. Open Cup ===
June 17 Fourth Round	Columbus Crew (MLS) (Ohio)	2–1 (a.e.t.)	(Indiana) Indy Eleven (NASL)	Akron, OH
7:30 PM EDT	Añor 4'; Bedell (red card) 34'; Paladini (red card) 110'; Clark (yellow card) 112'; Arrieta 114' (pen.)	Report	Corrado (yellow card) 45+1'; Smith 62'; Estridge (yellow card) 78'; Moore (yellow card) 105'	Stadium: FirstEnergy Stadium; Attendance: 1,913; Referee: Dimitar Chavdarov; Assistant referees: Cory Richardson; Igor Reznik

June 25 Fifth Round	Chicago Fire (MLS) (Illinois)	4–2 (a.e.t.)	(Ohio) Columbus Crew (MLS)	Bridgeview, IL
8:30 PM EDT	Ianni 34'; Pause (yellow card) 54'; Anangonó 83', 108'; Amarikwa 92'; Ward (yellow card) 118'	Report	Arrieta 55'; Añor 70'; Parkhurst (red card) 87'	Stadium: Toyota Park; Attendance: 5,124; Referee: Robert Sibiga; Assistant referees: Matthew Nelson; Khalaf Al-Latayfeh; Fourth official: Alejandro Mariscal

== Statistics ==
=== Appearances and goals ===
Under "Apps" for each section, the first number represents the number of starts, and the second number represents appearances as a substitute.

No.	Pos	Nat	Player	Total		MLS		MLS Cup Playoffs		U.S. Open Cup	
No.	Pos	Nat	Player	Apps	Goals	Apps	Goals	Apps	Goals	Apps	Goals
1	GK	(United States) USA	Steve Clark	38	0	34+0	0	2+0	0	2+0	0
2	DF	(United States) USA	Tyson Wahl	21	0	15+3	0	2+0	0	1+0	0
3	DF	(United States) USA	Josh Williams	16	0	13+1	0	0+1	0	1+0	0
4	DF	(United States) USA	Michael Parkhurst	37	0	32+1	0	2+0	0	1+1	0
5	DF	(Austria) AUT	Emanuel Pogatetz	2	0	0+2	0	0+0	0	0+0	0
6	MF	(Cameroon) CMR	Tony Tchani	37	1	33+0	0	2+0	1	2+0	0
7	MF	(Venezuela) VEN	Bernardo Añor	30	8	18+9	6	0+1	0	2+0	2
9	FW	(Iraq) IRQ	Justin Meram	36	9	19+13	8	2+0	1	1+1	0
10	FW	(Argentina) ARG	Federico Higuaín	30	12	28+1	11	1+0	1	0+0	0
11	MF	(United States) USA	Daniel Paladini	5	0	3+1	0	0+0	0	1+0	0
12	MF	(United States) USA	Hector Jiménez	28	1	19+5	1	2+0	0	2+0	0
13	MF	(United States) USA	Ethan Finlay	32	11	21+8	11	2+0	0	1+0	0
14	DF	(Costa Rica) CRC	Waylon Francis	26	0	24+0	0	2+0	0	0+0	0
16	DF	(United States) USA	Eric Gehrig	24	0	14+6	0	1+1	0	2+0	0
17	FW	(United States) USA	Ben Speas	16	1	8+5	1	0+1	0	2+0	0
18	FW	(United States) USA	Aaron Schoenfeld	16	3	7+8	3	1+0	0	0+0	0
19	FW	(Costa Rica) CRC	Jairo Arrieta	27	7	14+9	5	1+1	0	0+2	2
20	MF	(United States) USA	Wil Trapp	31	1	28+0	1	2+0	0	0+1	0
21	DF	(United States) USA	Chad Barson	15	0	8+5	0	0+0	0	1+1	0
22	DF	(United States) USA	Ben Sweat	1	0	0+0	0	0+0	0	1+0	0
23	MF	(Trinidad and Tobago) TTO	Kevan George	5	0	2+2	0	0+0	0	1+0	0
24	DF	(Uruguay) URU	Agustín Viana	4	1	4+0	1	0+0	0	0+0	0
25	MF	(United States) USA	Romain Gall	3	0	3+0	0	0+0	0	0+0	0
27	MF	(United States) USA	Ross Friedman	0	0	0+0	0	0+0	0	0+0	0
28	GK	(United States) USA	Matt Lampson	0	0	0+0	0	0+0	0	0+0	0
29	FW	(United States) USA	Adam Bedell	18	2	7+9	2	0+1	0	1+0	0
30	MF	(Ghana) GHA	Fifi Baiden	1	0	0+1	0	0+0	0	0+0	0
31	DF	(United States) USA	Matt Wiet	0	0	0+0	0	0+0	0	0+0	0
33	MF	(United States) USA	Matt Walker	0	0	0+0	0	0+0	0	0+0	0
41	GK	(United States) USA	Brad Stuver	0	0	0+0	0	0+0	0	0+0	0
			Own goal	0	1	-	1	-	0	-	0
Players who left Columbus during the season:
5	DF	(Costa Rica) CRC	Giancarlo González	17	1	17+0	1	0+0	0	0+0	0
8	FW	(Ghana) GHA	Dominic Oduro	11	0	6+5	0	0+0	0	0+0	0
25	MF	(Spain) ESP	Álvaro Rey	2	0	0+2	0	0+0	0	0+0	0
26	FW	(United States) USA	Ryan Finley	0	0	0+0	0	0+0	0	0+0	0
40	GK	(United States) USA	Daniel Withrow	0	0	0+0	0	0+0	0	0+0	0

=== Disciplinary record ===
No.	Pos.	Name	MLS		MLS Cup Playoffs		U.S. Open Cup		Total	
No.	Pos.	Name	Yellow card	Red card	Yellow card	Red card	Yellow card	Red card	Yellow card	Red card
1	GK	(United States) Steve Clark	2	0	0	0	1	0	3	0
2	DF	(United States) Tyson Wahl	3	0	0	0	0	0	3	0
3	DF	(United States) Josh Williams	1	0	0	0	0	0	1	0
4	DF	(United States) Michael Parkhurst	1	0	0	0	0	1	1	1
5	DF	(Austria) Emanuel Pogatetz	0	0	0	0	0	0	0	0
6	MF	(Cameroon) Tony Tchani	7	0	0	0	0	0	7	0
7	MF	(Venezuela) Bernardo Añor	5	0	1	0	0	0	6	0
9	FW	(Iraq) Justin Meram	2	0	2	1	0	0	4	1
10	FW	(Argentina) Federico Higuaín	8	0	0	0	0	0	8	0
11	MF	(United States) Daniel Paladini	1	0	0	0	0	1	1	1
12	MF	(United States) Hector Jiménez	2	0	0	0	0	0	2	0
13	MF	(United States) Ethan Finlay	2	0	0	1	0	0	2	1
14	DF	(Costa Rica) Waylon Francis	4	0	1	0	0	0	5	0
16	DF	(United States) Eric Gehrig	3	0	0	0	0	0	3	0
17	FW	(United States) Ben Speas	0	0	0	0	0	0	0	0
18	FW	(United States) Aaron Schoenfeld	1	0	0	0	0	0	1	0
19	FW	(Costa Rica) Jairo Arrieta	1	0	0	0	0	0	1	0
20	MF	(United States) Wil Trapp	4	0	0	0	0	0	4	0
21	DF	(United States) Chad Barson	1	0	0	0	0	0	1	0
22	DF	(Canada) Ben Sweat	0	0	0	0	0	0	0	0
23	MF	(Trinidad and Tobago) Kevan George	0	0	0	0	0	0	0	0
24	DF	(Uruguay) Agustín Viana	1	0	0	0	0	0	1	0
25	MF	(United States) Romain Gall	0	0	0	0	0	0	0	0
27	MF	(United States) Ross Friedman	0	0	0	0	0	0	0	0
28	GK	(Argentina) Matt Lampson	0	0	0	0	0	0	0	0
29	FW	(United States) Adam Bedell	0	0	0	0	0	1	0	1
30	MF	(Ghana) Fifi Baiden	0	0	0	0	0	0	0	0
31	DF	(United States) Matt Wiet	0	0	0	0	0	0	0	0
33	MF	(United States) Matt Walker	0	0	0	0	0	0	0	0
41	GK	(United States) Brad Stuver	0	0	0	0	0	0	0	0
Players who left Columbus during the season:
5	DF	(Costa Rica) Giancarlo González	3	0	0	0	0	0	3	0
8	FW	(Ghana) Dominic Oduro	1	0	0	0	0	0	1	0
25	MF	(Spain) Álvaro Rey	0	0	0	0	0	0	0	0
26	FW	(United States) Ryan Finley	0	0	0	0	0	0	0	0
40	GK	(United States) Daniel Withrow	0	0	0	0	0	0	0	0

=== Clean sheets ===
No.	Name	MLS	MLS Cup Playoffs	U.S. Open Cup	Total	Games Played		
No.	Name	1	(United States) Steve Clark	8	0	0	8	38
28	(United States) Matt Lampson	0	0	0	0	0		
41	(United States) Brad Stuver	0	0	0	0	0		
Players who left Columbus during the season:
40	(United States) Daniel Withrow	0	0	0	0	0		

== Transfers ==
=== In ===
Pos.	Player	Transferred from	Fee/notes	Date	Source
DF	(United States) Ross Friedman	(United States) Harvard Crimson	Signed to a homegrown contract	January 8, 2014	
MF	(United States) Matt Walker	(United States) Xavier Musketeers	Signed to a homegrown contract	January 8, 2014	
DF	(United States) Michael Parkhurst	(Germany) FC Augsburg	Rights traded from New England Revolution for a first round draft pick in the 2014 MLS SuperDraft	January 13, 2014	
MF	(United States) Hector Jiménez	(United States) LA Galaxy	Traded with a first round draft pick in the 2014 MLS SuperDraft for a second round draft pick in the 2014 MLS SuperDraft and allocation money	January 14, 2014	
DF	(United States) Ben Sweat	(United States) South Florida Bulls	Drafted in round 1 of the 2014 MLS SuperDraft	February 14, 2014	
MF	(Ghana) Fifi Baiden	(United States) UC Santa Barbara Gauchos	Drafted in round 3 of the 2014 MLS SuperDraft	February 14, 2014	
DF	(Costa Rica) Giancarlo González	(Norway) Vålerenga Fotball	Signed via discovery	February 21, 2014	
FW	(United States) Adam Bedell	(United States) Detroit Mercy Titans	Drafted in round 3 of the 2014 MLS SuperDraft	March 5, 2014	
MF	(Spain) Álvaro Rey	(Canada) Toronto FC	Traded for Dominic Oduro	June 6, 2014	
MF	(United States) Romain Gall	(France) FC Lorient II	Acquired via weighted lottery	August 7, 2014	
DF	(Austria) Emanuel Pogatetz	(Germany) FC Augsburg	Signed via discovery	September 9, 2014	
FW	(Sierra Leone) Kei Kamara	(England) Middlesbrough F.C.	Signed via allocation ranking	October 7, 2014	
MF	(United States) Ben Swanson	(United States) Columbus Crew Academy	Signed to a homegrown contract	October 16, 2014	
FW	(Eritrea) Mohammed Saeid	(Sweden) Örebro SK	Free transfer	October 29, 2014	
MF	(Venezuela) Bernardo Añor	(United States) Columbus Crew	Signed to a new contract	December 2, 2014	
FW	(Iraq) Justin Meram	(United States) Columbus Crew	Signed to a new contract	December 2, 2014	
MF	(Iceland) Kristinn Steindorsson	(Sweden) Halmstads BK	Free transfer	December 11, 2014	

=== Loans in ===
Pos.	Player	Parent club	Length/Notes	Beginning	End	Source
GK	(United States) Daniel Withrow	(United States) MLS Pool	Short term agreement	June 17, 2014	June 26, 2014	

=== Out ===
Pos.	Player	Transferred to	Fee/notes	Date	Source
MF	(United States) Shawn Sloan	(United States) Oakland County FC	Released	February 14, 2014	
GK	(United States) Daniel Withrow	(United States) MLS Pool	Released	March 1, 2014	
FW	(United States) Ryan Finley	(United States) Chivas USA	Traded for a second round draft pick in the 2016 MLS SuperDraft	May 8, 2014	
FW	(Ghana) Dominic Oduro	(Canada) Toronto FC	Traded for Álvaro Rey	June 6, 2014	
MF	(Spain) Álvaro Rey	(Spain) AD Alcorcón	Mutually agreed to terminate contract	July 15, 2014	
DF	(Costa Rica) Giancarlo González	(Italy) Palermo FC	Transfer, terms undisclosed	August 26, 2014	
DF	(United States) Matt Wiet	Retired	Option declined	November 18, 2014	
DF	(United States) Ross Friedman	Retired	Option declined	November 18, 2014	
MF	(Ghana) Fifi Baiden	Retired	Option declined	November 18, 2014	
MF	(United States) Daniel Paladini	Retired	Option declined	November 18, 2014	
MF	(Uruguay) Agustín Viana	(Uruguay) Danubio F.C.	Option declined	November 18, 2014	
MF	(United States) Matt Walker	(United States) AFC Cleveland	Option declined	November 18, 2014	
FW	(Costa Rica) Jairo Arrieta	(United States) Orlando City SC	Option declined; Selected in the 2014 MLS Expansion Draft	November 18, 2014	
DF	(United States) Eric Gehrig	(United States) Orlando City SC	Contract expired; Selected in the 2014 MLS Expansion Draft	November 18, 2014	
MF	(Venezuela) Bernardo Añor	(United States) Columbus Crew	Contract expired	November 18, 2014	
FW	(Iraq) Justin Meram	(United States) Columbus Crew	Contract expired	November 18, 2014	
DF	(United States) Josh Williams	(United States) New York City FC	Traded for allocation money	December 8, 2014	
MF	(Venezuela) Bernardo Añor	(United States) Sporting Kansas City	Traded for allocation money	December 8, 2014	

=== Loans out ===
Pos.	Player	Loanee club	Length/Notes	Beginning	End	Source
FW	(United States) Ryan Finley	(United States) Dayton Dutch Lions	Columbus retains right to recall at any time	March 12, 2014	May 8, 2014	
DF	(United States) Ross Friedman	(United States) Dayton Dutch Lions	Columbus retains right to recall at any time	March 12, 2014	End of Season	
MF	(United States) Kevan George	(United States) Dayton Dutch Lions	Columbus retains right to recall at any time	March 12, 2014	End of Season	
GK	(United States) Brad Stuver	(United States) Dayton Dutch Lions	Columbus retains right to recall at any time	March 12, 2014	End of Season	
MF	(United States) Matt Walker	(United States) Dayton Dutch Lions	Columbus retains right to recall at any time	March 12, 2014	End of Season	

=== MLS Draft picks ===
Draft picks are not automatically signed to the team roster. Only those who are signed to a contract will be listed as transfers in. The picks for the Columbus Crew are listed below:

2014 Columbus Crew SuperDraft Picks
Round	Pick	Player	Position	College
1	14	(United States) Ben Sweat	DF	South Florida
3	42	(Ghana) Fifi Baiden	MF	UC Santa Barbara
3	45	(United States) Adam Bedell	FW	Detroit Mercy

== Awards ==
MLS Team of the Week
Week	Starters	Bench	Opponent(s)	Link
1	(United States) Michael Parkhurst (Argentina) Federico Higuaín (United States) Gregg Berhalter (Coach)	(United States) Josh Williams (United States) Wil Trapp	(United States) D.C. United	
3	(Venezuela) Bernardo Añor	(Costa Rica) Giancarlo González	(United States) Philadelphia Union	
4	(Argentina) Federico Higuaín	(United States) Steve Clark	(United States) Seattle Sounders FC	
6	(Argentina) Federico Higuaín		(United States) San Jose Earthquakes	
7		(United States) Wil Trapp	(United States) D.C. United	
8	(United States) Steve Clark		(United States) New York Red Bulls	
11	(Argentina) Federico Higuaín		(United States) Portland Timbers	
12	(Argentina) Federico Higuaín		(United States) Chicago Fire	
14	(United States) Michael Parkhurst	(United States) Steve Clark (United States) Ethan Finlay	(United States) Real Salt Lake (United States) D.C. United	
17	(United States) Ethan Finlay		(United States) Colorado Rapids	
19	(Venezuela) Bernardo Añor		(Canada) Montreal Impact	
20	(Costa Rica) Giancarlo González	(United States) Steve Clark	(United States) New England Revolution	
23	(United States) Steve Clark (Costa Rica) Giancarlo González (Cameroon) Tony Tchani	(Iraq) Justin Meram	(United States) LA Galaxy	
24	(Iraq) Justin Meram	(United States) Steve Clark	(United States) Houston Dynamo	
26	(Iraq) Justin Meram		(United States) Chivas USA	
28	(United States) Steve Clark (United States) Eric Gehrig (Cameroon) Tony Tchani		(United States) New England Revolution	
29	(United States) Ethan Finlay		(Canada) Montreal Impact	
31	(Cameroon) Tony Tchani	(United States) Hector Jiménez	(United States) Philadelphia Union	
32	(United States) Ethan Finlay (United States) Wil Trapp (United States) Gregg Berhalter (Coach)	(Cameroon) Tony Tchani (United States) Aaron Schoenfeld	(United States) New York Red Bulls	
33	(Costa Rica) Waylon Francis	(Cameroon) Tony Tchani	(United States) Philadelphia Union	

=== MLS Player of the Week ===
Week	Player	Opponent	Link
3	(Venezuela) Bernardo Añor	Philadelphia Union	
11	(Argentina) Federico Higuaín	Portland Timbers	

=== MLS Save of the Week ===
Week	Player	Opponent	Link
19	(United States) Steve Clark	Montreal Impact	
29	(United States) Steve Clark	Montreal Impact	

=== 2014 MLS All-Star Game ===
Starters

- DF Michael Parkhurst

=== 2014 MLS Homegrown Game ===
- GK Matt Lampson
- MF Wil Trapp

=== Postseason ===
MLS Fair Play Award

- DF Michael Parkhurst

Marketing Team of the Year
Ticketing Sales Innovation Award

- Membership Extension Program

Article of the Year

- Behind the Brand: The Story of #NewCrew

=== Crew Team Awards ===
- Circle of Honor – Frankie Hejduk
- Most Valuable Player – Federico Higuaín
- Golden Boot – Federico Higuaín & Ethan Finlay
- Defender of the Year – Steve Clark
- Goal of the Year – Ben Speas
- Kirk Urso Heart Award – Steve Clark
- Humanitarian of the Year – Matt Lampson
- Academy Player of the Year – Ben Swanson

== Kits ==
Home	Away	Away Alternate

Type	Shirt	Shorts	Socks	First appearance / Info
Home	Yellow	Yellow	Yellow	
Away	White / Black-Yellow	White	Black	
Away Alt.	White / Black-Yellow	White	White	MLS, March 8 against D.C. United
