= Santa Ynez Valley =

Valley in California, United States of America

- Valle de Santa Ynez (Spanish)
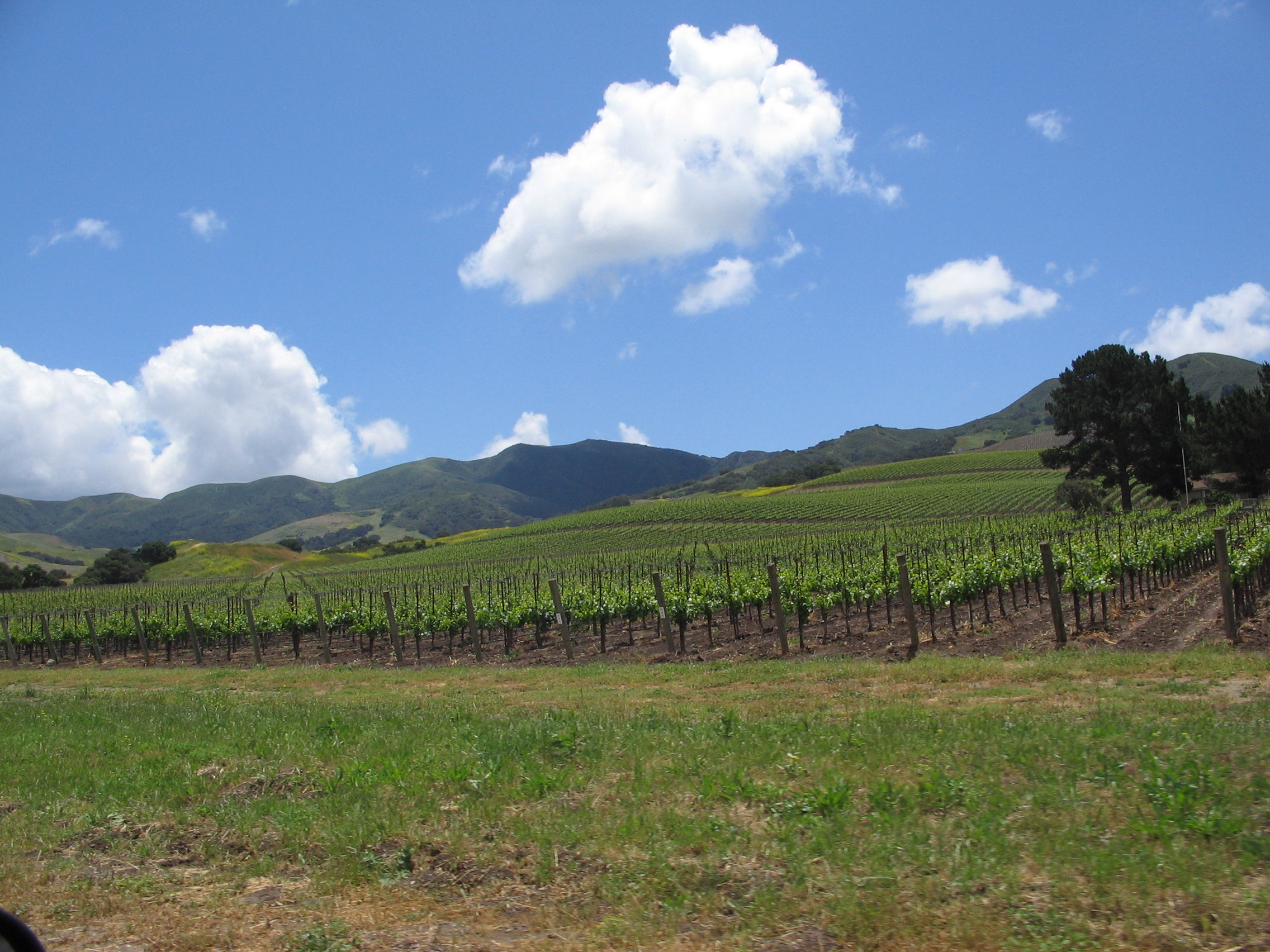
- A typical vineyard in the Santa Ynez Valley

- Location within California

Geography
- Location: California, United States
- Population centers: Solvang, Los Olivos, Santa Ynez, Buellton, Ballard
- Coordinates: 34°35′03″N 120°05′51″W
- Rivers: Santa Ynez River
- Interactive map of Santa Ynez Valley

The Santa Ynez Valley (Spanish: Valle de Santa Ynez) is located in Santa Barbara County, California, between the Santa Ynez Mountains to the south and the San Rafael Mountains to the north. The Santa Ynez River flows through the valley from east to west. The Santa Ynez Valley is separated from the Los Alamos Valley, to the northwest, by the Purisima Hills, and from the Santa Maria Valley by the Solomon Hills. The Santa Rita Hills separate the Santa Ynez Valley from the Santa Rita and Lompoc Valleys to the west.

The valley has a population of about 20,000 residents living in the communities of Solvang, Los Olivos, Santa Ynez, Buellton, and Ballard.

== Economy ==
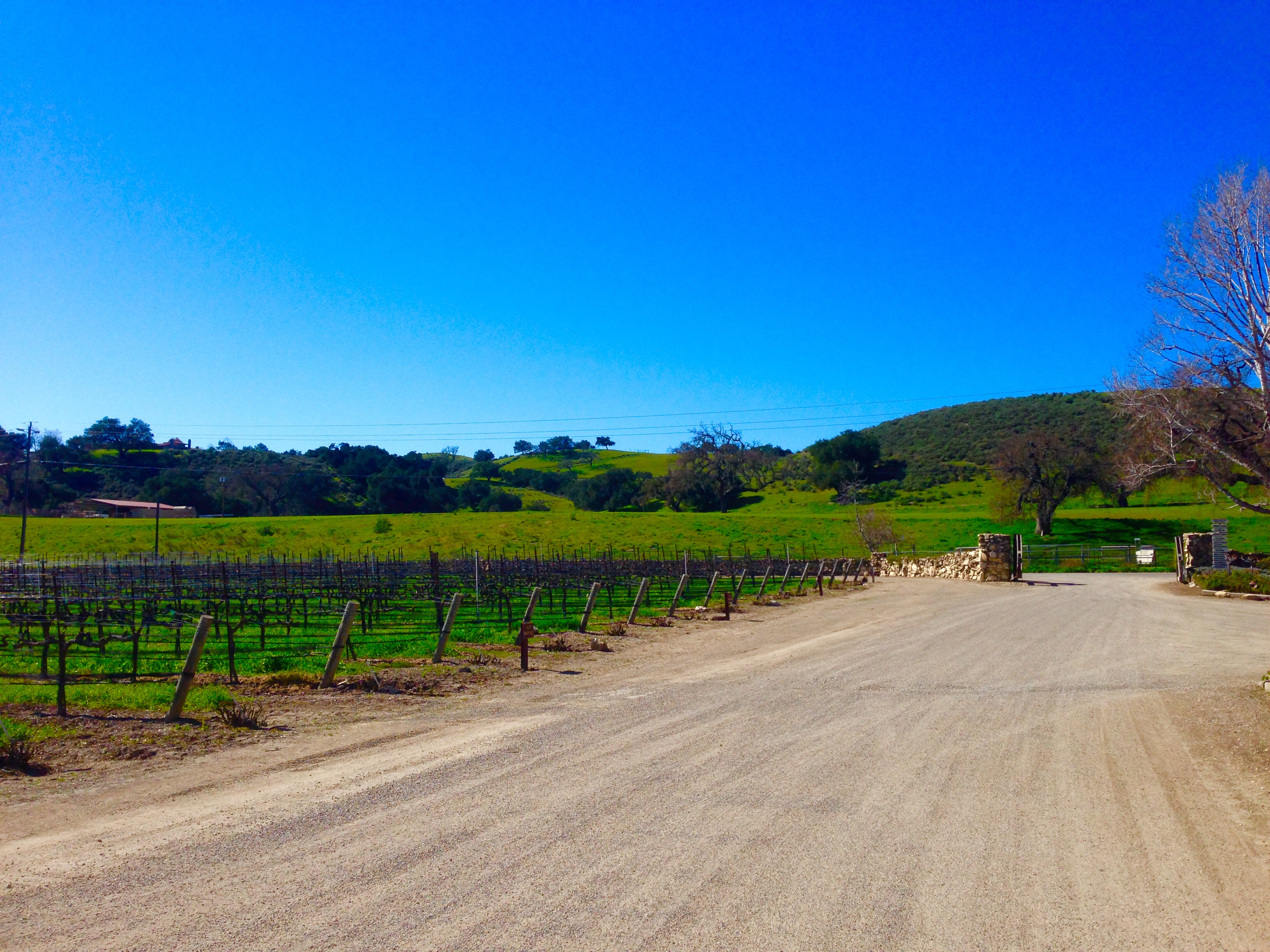
Vineyard in Santa Ynez.

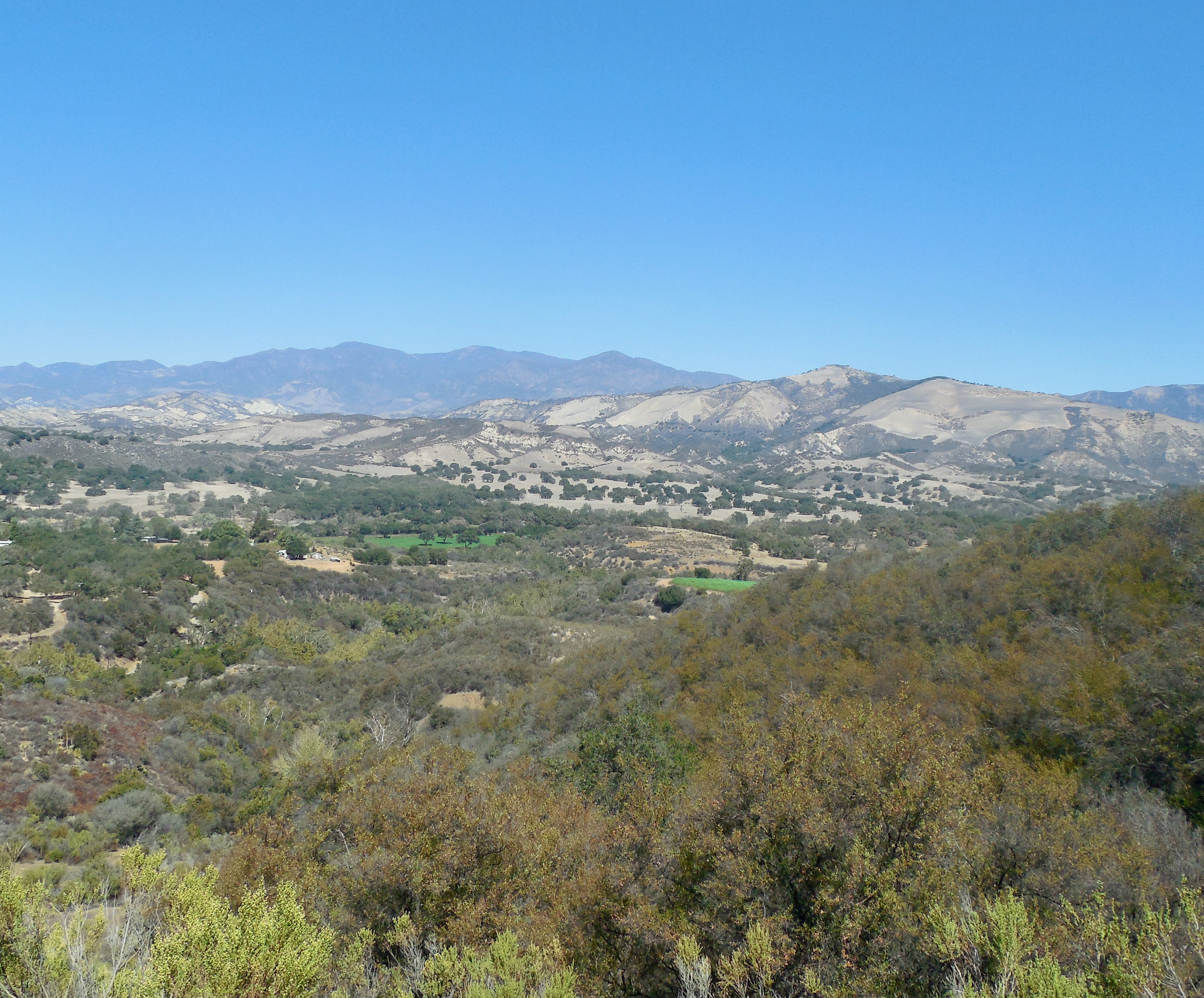
Northerly view of the eastern Santa Ynez Valley from Los Padres National Forest.

The economy of the Santa Ynez Valley is driven by agriculture (particularly viticulture), the equine industry, and tourism.

=== Agriculture ===
The wine industry is a major part of the Santa Ynez Valley's economy and was designated in 1983 the Santa Ynez Valley American Viticultural Area (AVA) by the Bureau of Alcohol, Tobacco and Firearms (ATF) after petitioned by Firestone Vineyard. The Santa Ynez Valley Visitors Association lists over 70 wineries and tasting rooms on their website. Besides cultivating over 1,200 acres (490 ha) of wine grapes on about forty vineyards, the valley contains numerous apple farms, many with roadside apple stands or "pick your own" programs.

=== Equine ===
Horses are seen throughout the valley and a historic Western atmosphere is kept alive. Notable ranches include Monty Roberts' Flag Is Up Farms, River Edge Farm (thoroughbreds), and the nationally known Alamo Pintado Equine Medical Center. This valley is noted for having over 52 different breeds of horses, plus 28 veterinarians.

=== Tourism ===
Tourists often visit the valley for its attractions including numerous art galleries, wine tasting rooms, and antique stores as well as resorts such as the Alisal Guest Ranch, Lake Cachuma, PCPA's Theatrefest, and the Chumash Casino. Because of good weather year round, many participate in outdoor activities such as hiking in the nearby Los Padres National Forest or bicycling throughout the valley.

== Politics ==
The Santa Ynez Valley is part of Santa Barbara County's Third Supervisorial District, whose voters are registered 47% Democratic and 25% Republican. Registered voters within the Valley's two incorporated cities are: Buellton 38% Democratic and 34% Republican; and Solvang with 38% Democratic and 35% Republican registered voters. The Valley, geographically located at the center of Santa Barbara County and partially surrounded by the Los Padres National Forest, is sometimes regarded as more politically aligned with northern Santa Barbara County and would have been included in the proposed Mission County under "Measure H," rejected by 81% of County voters in the June 6, 2006 Direct Primary election. Numerous smart growth-type coalitions have formed such as the Santa Ynez Valley Alliance, Preservation of Los Olivos (POLO), Preservation of Santa Ynez (POSY), WeWatch, and the Santa Ynez Valley Concerned Citizens. These groups' stated mission is the preservation of the Santa Ynez Valley.

== Arts and culture ==
The 2004 film Sideways was set (and shot on location) in the Santa Ynez Valley. Since then, visits from tourists looking to recreate the experiences of the fictional characters Miles and Jack, have become common. Fans of the movie can often be seen making a pilgrimage from the Buellton Days Inn to the Hitching Post restaurant. Other movies that have been filmed in the Santa Ynez Valley include indie film "Flying Lessons" featuring Michael O’Neill, Maggie Grace, and Hal Holbrook, “Michael Jackson: The Untold Story of Neverland", “Uncorked” /Hallmark/Larry Levinson; “Bad Girls”; “It’s Complicated”/Universal; Nitro Circus/MTV; “Inside Luxury Travel”; “The Othersiders”/Red Varden Studios;“More to Love”; “Back in Wedding Shape”; “You’re Hired”; “Kathy Griffin Season 2”; and “Somewhere” Movie locations

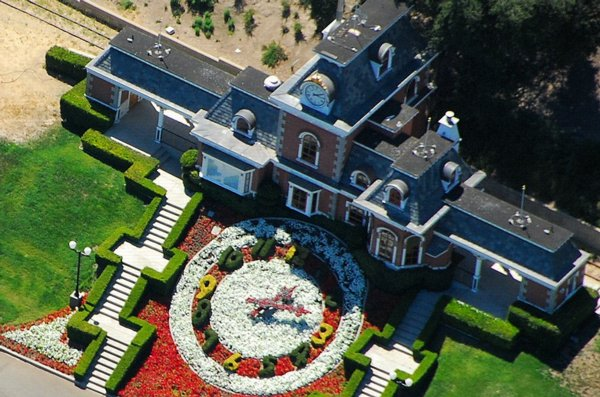
Neverland's train station, Katherine Station, in August 2008

An estate in the Valley, 5 miles (8.0 km) from the town of Los Olivos, California, was one of the filming locations for a 1983 video of the song "Say Say Say", featuring Michael Jackson, Paul McCartney and Linda McCartney. At the time, it was called Sycamore Valley Ranch. According to La Toya Jackson, Michael expressed interest in someday buying the property. In 1988, he would do so, renaming it Neverland Ranch. The singer sold the property prior to his death and in 2017, the estate, again Sycamore Valley Ranch was for sale at an asking price of $67 million.

== Education ==
- Allan Hancock College: Solvang Campus
- Santa Ynez Valley Union High School
- Los Olivos Elementary School
- Ballard Elementary School
- Olive Grove Charter School
- Dunn School
- Midland School
- The Family School
- Santa Ynez Elementary
- College School (Charter School)
- Santa Ynez Valley Christian Academy
- Jonata Middle School
- Oak Valley Elementary School
- Solvang Elementary School

== Transportation ==
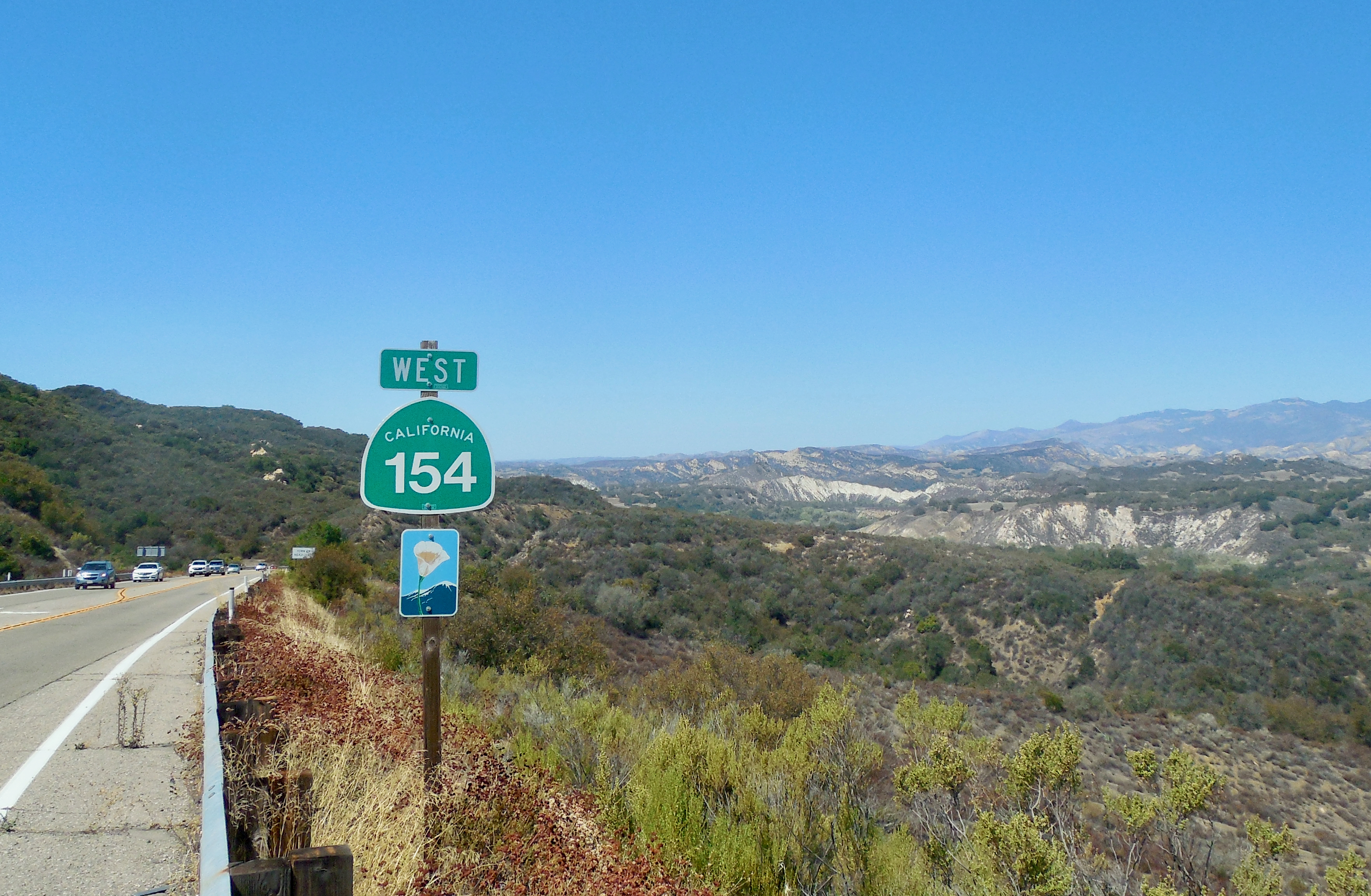
View of the Santa Ynez Valley from State Route 154.

=== Major highways ===
- U.S. Route 101
- State Route 154
- State Route 246

=== Public transportation ===
- Santa Ynez Valley Transit provides service to the communities of Buellton, Los Olivos, Santa Ynez, and Solvang. Route A is a clockwise-oriented route through the four communities, traveling along State Route 246 as its primary thoroughfare. Route B transit service circulates along the same route, in a counterclockwise direction.

=== Airports ===
- Santa Ynez Airport, a public regional general aviation airport, which is located about 1 mi (2 km) southeast of the central business district of Santa Ynez.

== See also ==
- California wine
