= Dunn School =

Dunn School may refer to:

- Sir William Dunn School of Pathology, University of Oxford
- Dunn School, Los Olivos, a private boarding and day school for grades 6–12 located outside of Los Olivos, California
