= 2014 MLS SuperDraft =

College draft for soccer teams

General information
- Sport: Soccer
- Date: January 16, 2014
- Time: 12 p.m. ET
- Location: Philadelphia, Pennsylvania
- Network: ESPNews

Overview
- 77 total selections
- First selection: Andre Blake, Philadelphia Union

The 2014 MLS SuperDraft was the fifteenth SuperDraft presented by Major League Soccer. The first two rounds of the four round draft took place on January 16, 2014, in Philadelphia, Pennsylvania at the Philadelphia Convention Center. Rounds three and four took place on January 21, 2014, via conference call.

== Changes from 2013 ==
- The SuperDraft was expanded from two rounds to four rounds.
- The Supplemental Draft, typically held one week after the SuperDraft, was eliminated.

== Selection order ==
The MLS SuperDraft selection order has been constant throughout league history:

1. The nine clubs which do not qualify for the playoffs receive picks #1 through #9 (in reverse order of season points);
2. The two clubs eliminated in the Knockout round of playoffs receive picks #10 and #11 (in reverse order of season points);
3. The four clubs eliminated in the Conference Semifinals receive picks #12 through #15 (in reverse order of season points);
4. The two clubs eliminated in the Conference Finals receive picks #16 and #17 (in reverse order of season points);
5. The club which loses 2013 MLS Cup receives pick #18;
6. The club which wins 2013 MLS Cup receives pick #19.

This selection order pertains to all rounds of the MLS SuperDraft.

*	Denotes player who has been selected for an MLS Best XI team

=== Round 1 ===
Any player marked with a * is part of the Generation Adidas program.

Pick #	MLS team	Player	Position	Affiliation
1	Philadelphia Union (Note: #1: D.C. United → Philadelphia Union. January 16, 2014: Philadelphia Union acquired the #1 overall selection in the 2014 SuperDraft from D.C. United in exchange for the #2 overall selection in the 2014 SuperDraft and allocation money.)	(Jamaica) Andre Blake*	Goalkeeper	Connecticut
2	D.C. United (Note: #2: Chivas USA → Philadelphia Union → D.C. United. January 16, 2014: D.C. United acquired the #2 overall selection in the 2014 SuperDraft and allocation money from Philadelphia Union in exchange for the #1 overall selection in the 2014 SuperDraft. On May 14, 2013, Philadelphia Union had acquired this first-round selection in the 2014 SuperDraft and allocation money from Chivas USA in exchange for midfielder Gabriel Farfan.)	(United States) Steve Birnbaum	Defender	California; Orange County Blue Star
3	Vancouver Whitecaps FC (Note: #3: Toronto FC → Vancouver Whitecaps FC. July 20, 2012: Vancouver Whitecaps FC acquired a first-round selection in the 2014 SuperDraft and use of an international roster spot for 2012 and 2013 from Toronto FC in exchange for forward Eric Hassli.)	(United States) Christian Dean*	Defender	California
4	New England Revolution (Note: #4: Columbus Crew → New England Revolution. January 13, 2014: New England Revolution acquired a first-round selection in the 2014 SuperDraft and allocation money from Columbus Crew in exchange for the rights to Michael Parkhurst.)	(United States) Steve Neumann	Forward	Georgetown; Reading United
5	Montreal Impact (Note: #5: FC Dallas → Montreal Impact. January 16, 2014: Montreal Impact acquired the #5 overall selection in the 2014 SuperDraft from FC Dallas in exchange for the #10 overall selection in the 2014 SuperDraft, allocation money, and a 2014 international roster slot.)	(United States) Eric Miller*	Defender	Creighton; Portland Timbers U23s
6	FC Dallas (Note: #6: Philadelphia Union → FC Dallas. January 16, 2014: FC Dallas acquired the #6 overall selection in the 2014 SuperDraft from Philadelphia Union in exchange for the #10 overall selection in the 2014 SuperDraft and allocation money.)	(Canada) Tesho Akindele	Forward	Colorado School of Mines; Real Colorado Foxes
7	Vancouver Whitecaps FC	(Jamaica) Andre Lewis	Midfielder	Portmore United
8	Seattle Sounders FC (Note: #8: Chicago Fire → Seattle Sounders FC. January 15, 2014: Seattle Sounders FC acquired the #8 selection in the first round of the 2014 SuperDraft, defender Jalil Anibaba, and a conditional third-round selection in the 2015 MLS SuperDraft from Chicago Fire in exchange for the #13 selection in the first round of the 2014 SuperDraft, defender Jhon Kennedy Hurtado, and defender Patrick Ianni.)	(Jamaica) Damion Lowe*	Defender	Hartford; Reading United
9	San Jose Earthquakes	(United States) J. J. Koval	Midfielder	Stanford; Ventura County Fusion
10	Toronto FC (Note: #10: Montreal Impact → FC Dallas → Philadelphia Union → Toronto FC. January 16, 2014: Toronto FC acquired the #10 selection in the first round of the 2014 SuperDraft from Philadelphia Union in exchange for the #15 selection in the first round of the 2014 SuperDraft and allocation money. Earlier the same day, Philadelphia Union had acquired the #10 overall selection in the 2014 SuperDraft and allocation money from FC Dallas in exchange for the #6 overall selection in the 2014 SuperDraft. Earlier the same day, FC Dallas had acquired this pick, allocation money, and a 2014 international roster spot from Montreal Impact in exchange for the #5 overall selection in the 2014 SuperDraft.)	(United States) Nick Hagglund	Defender	Xavier
11	New England Revolution (Note: #11: Colorado Rapids → New England Revolution. January 16, 2014: New England Revolution acquired the #11 selection in the first round of the 2014 SuperDraft from Colorado Rapids in exchange for the #12 and #19 selections in the first round of the 2014 SuperDraft.)	(United States) Patrick Mullins	Forward	Maryland; New Orleans Jesters
12	Colorado Rapids (Note: #12: New England Revolution → Colorado Rapids. January 16, 2014: Colorado Rapids acquired the #12 selection and the #19 selection in the first round of the 2014 SuperDraft from New England Revolution in exchange for the #11 selection in the first round of the 2014 SuperDraft.)	(United States) Marlon Hairston*	Midfielder	Louisville
13	Chicago Fire (Note: #13: Seattle Sounders FC → Chicago Fire. January 15, 2014: Chicago Fire acquired the #13 selection in the first round of the 2014 SuperDraft, defender Jhon Kennedy Hurtado, and defender Patrick Ianni from Seattle Sounders FC in exchange for the #8 selection in the first round of the 2014 SuperDraft, defender Jalil Anibaba, and a conditional third-round selection in the 2015 MLS SuperDraft.)	(United States) Marco Franco	Defender	UC Irvine; OC Blues Strikers FC
14	Columbus Crew (Note: #14: Los Angeles Galaxy → Columbus Crew. January 14, 2014: Columbus Crew acquired a first-round selection in the 2014 SuperDraft and midfielder Hector Jiménez from Los Angeles Galaxy in exchange for a second-round selection in the 2014 SuperDraft and allocation money.)	(United States) Ben Sweat	Defender	USF; Reading United
15	Philadelphia Union (Note: #15: New York Red Bulls → Toronto FC → Philadelphia Union. January 16, 2014: Philadelphia Union acquired this first-round selection and allocation money from Toronto FC in exchange for the #10 overall selection in the 2014 SuperDraft. On December 13, 2013, Toronto FC had acquired a first-round selection in the 2014 SuperDraft and a first-round selection in the 2016 MLS Supplemental Draft from New York Red Bulls in exchange for midfielder Bobby Convey and a second-round selection in the 2014 SuperDraft. At the time of the trade, the 2016 Supplemental Draft pick would be in the third round of a combined SuperDraft/Supplemental Draft.)	(Brazil) Pedro Ribeiro	Midfielder	Coastal Carolina; Reading United
16	Houston Dynamo	(United States) A. J. Cochran*	Defender	Wisconsin; K-W United FC
17	Portland Timbers	(Zimbabwe) Schillo Tshuma*	Forward	Maryland
18	Real Salt Lake	(United States) Ryan Neil	Defender	California
19	Colorado Rapids (Note: #19: Sporting Kansas City → New England Revolution → Colorado Rapids. January 16, 2014: Colorado Rapids acquired the #12 selection and the #19 selection in the first round of the 2014 SuperDraft from New England Revolution in exchange for the #11 selection in the first round of the 2014 SuperDraft. On December 11, 2012, New England Revolution had acquired this first-round selection in the 2014 SuperDraft, a second-round selection in the 2015 MLS SuperDraft, and allocation money from Sporting Kansas City in exchange for midfielder Benny Feilhaber.)	(United States) Grant Van De Casteele	Defender	Notre Dame

=== Round 2 ===
Pick #	MLS team	Player	Position	Affiliation
20	Chivas USA (Note: #20: D.C. United → Chivas USA. January 25, 2013: Chivas USA acquired a second-round selection in the 2014 SuperDraft from D.C. United in exchange for forward Casey Townsend.)	(United States) Thomas McNamara	Midfielder	Clemson; Jersey Express
21	Seattle Sounders FC (Note: #21: Chivas USA → Seattle Sounders FC. February 19, 2013: Seattle Sounders FC acquired a second-round selection in the 2014 SuperDraft, a second-round selection in the 2015 MLS SuperDraft, midfielder Shalrie Joseph, and the #3 spot in the 2013 MLS Allocation Order from Chivas USA in exchange for the #15 spot in the 2013 MLS Allocation Order.)	(United States) Jimmy Ockford	Defender	Louisville; Reading United
22	New York Red Bulls (Note: #22: Toronto FC → New York Red Bulls. December 13, 2013: New York Red Bulls acquired a second-round selection in the 2014 SuperDraft and midfielder Bobby Convey from Toronto FC in exchange for a first-round selection in the 2014 SuperDraft and a first-round selection in the 2016 MLS Supplemental Draft. At the time of the trade, the 2016 Supplemental Draft pick would be in the third round of a combined SuperDraft/Supplemental Draft.)	(United States) Chris Duvall	Defender	Wake Forest
23	Los Angeles Galaxy (Note: #23: Columbus Crew → Los Angeles Galaxy. January 14, 2014: Los Angeles Galaxy acquired a second-round selection in the 2014 SuperDraft and allocation money from Columbus Crew in exchange for a first-round selection in the 2014 SuperDraft and midfielder Hector Jiménez.)	(United States) Kyle Venter	Defender	New Mexico; Real Colorado Foxes
24	Toronto FC (Note: #24: FC Dallas → Toronto FC. February 4, 2013: Toronto FC acquired a conditional second-round selection in the 2014 SuperDraft from FC Dallas in exchange for forward Eric Hassli.)	(United States) Daniel Lovitz	Midfielder	Elon; Carolina Dynamo
25	Philadelphia Union	(United States) Kevin Cope	Defender	Michigan State; Michigan Bucks
26	Portland Timbers (Note: #26: Vancouver Whitecaps FC → Portland Timbers. February 21, 2013: Portland Timbers acquired a second-round selection in the 2014 SuperDraft and a second-round selection in the 2015 MLS SuperDraft from Vancouver Whitecaps FC in exchange for the MLS rights to midfielder Nigel Reo-Coker.)	(United States) Taylor Peay	Defender	Washington; North Sound SeaWolves
27	Philadelphia Union (Note: #27: Chicago Fire → Philadelphia Union. May 23, 2013: Philadelphia Union acquired a second-round selection in the 2014 SuperDraft and allocation money from Chicago Fire in exchange for defender Bakary Soumaré.)	(United States) Robbie Derschang	Defender	Akron; Austin Aztex
28	San Jose Earthquakes	(United States) Joe Sofia	Defender	UCLA; Ventura County Fusion
29	D.C. United (Note: #29: Montreal Impact → D.C. United. January 16, 2014: D.C. United acquired a second-round selection in the 2014 SuperDraft from Montreal Impact in exchange for an international roster spot.)	(Spain) Victor Muñoz	Midfielder	UCLA; OC Blues Strikers FC
30	Vancouver Whitecaps FC (Note: #30: Colorado Rapids → Vancouver Whitecaps FC. January 20, 2012: Vancouver Whitecaps FC acquired a second-round selection in the 2014 SuperDraft and use of an international roster spot for 2012, 2013, and 2014 from Colorado Rapids in exchange for allocation money.)	(Senegal) Mamadou Diouf	Forward	Connecticut
31	New England Revolution	(United States) Alec Sundly	Midfielder	California; Orange County Blue Star
32	Houston Dynamo (Note: #32: Seattle Sounders FC → Houston Dynamo. September 13, 2013: Houston Dynamo acquired a second-round selection in the 2014 SuperDraft and midfielder Servando Carrasco from Seattle Sounders FC in exchange for midfielder Adam Moffat.)	(United States) Mark Sherrod	Forward	Memphis; Portland Timbers U23s
33	Colorado Rapids (Note: #33: Los Angeles Galaxy → Colorado Rapids. June 17, 2013: Colorado Rapids acquired a second-round selection in the 2014 SuperDraft and use of an international roster spot for 2013 and 2014 from Los Angeles Galaxy in exchange for midfielder Pablo Mastroeni and the MLS rights to midfielder Baggio Husidić.)	(United States) Jared Watts	Midfielder	Wake Forest
34	New York Red Bulls	(United States) Eric Stevenson	Midfielder	Akron; Seattle Sounders FC U-23
35	Colorado Rapids (Note: #35: Houston Dynamo → Colorado Rapids. February 8, 2012: Colorado Rapids acquired a second-round pick, originally a conditional selection, in the 2014 SuperDraft from Houston Dynamo in exchange for forward Macoumba Kandji.)	(United States) John Berner	Goalkeeper	SIU Edwardsville; St. Louis Lions
36	Portland Timbers	(United States) Aaron Long	Midfielder	UC Riverside; FC Tucson
37	Montreal Impact (Note: #37: Real Salt Lake → Montreal Impact. July 11, 2012: Montreal Impact acquired a second-round selection in the 2014 SuperDraft, originally a conditional pick, from Real Salt Lake in exchange for forward Justin Braun.)	(United States) George Malki	Midfielder	Cal Poly
38	Sporting Kansas City	(Croatia) Adnan Gabeljic	Forward	St. Louis

=== Round 3 ===
Pick #	MLS team	Player	Position	Affiliation
39	Portland Timbers (Note: #39: D.C. United → Portland Timbers. August 9, 2012: Portland Timbers acquired a third-round selection in the 2014 SuperDraft, originally a first-round selection in the 2014 Supplemental Draft, from D.C. United in exchange for defender Mike Chabala.)	(United States) George Fochive	Midfielder	Connecticut; Real Maryland
40	Chivas USA	(United States) Kris Tyrpak	Forward	Houston Baptist; Austin Aztex
41	Sporting Kansas City (Note: #41: Toronto FC → Sporting Kansas City. May 16, 2013: Sporting Kansas City acquired a third-round selection in the 2014 SuperDraft from Toronto FC in exchange for midfielder Bobby Convey.)	(Germany) Peter Schmetz	Midfielder	UC Santa Barbara; Ventura County Fusion
42	Columbus Crew	(Ghana) Fifi Baiden	Midfielder	UC Santa Barbara
43	FC Dallas	(Trinidad and Tobago) Nick Walker	Defender	Fairleigh Dickinson; Michigan Bucks
44	Philadelphia Union	(United States) Richie Marquez	Defender	Redlands
45	Columbus Crew (Note: #45: Vancouver Whitecaps FC → Columbus Crew. January 21, 2014: Columbus Crew acquired a third-round selection in the 2014 SuperDraft from Vancouver Whitecaps FC in exchange for use of an international roster spot for 2014.)	(United States) Adam Bedell	Forward	Detroit-Mercy; Detroit City FC
46	Philadelphia Union (Note: #46: Chicago Fire → Toronto FC → Philadelphia Union. September 13, 2013: Philadelphia Union acquired a third-round selection in the 2014 SuperDraft from Toronto FC in exchange for goalkeeper Chris Konopka. On February 27, 2013, Toronto FC had acquired this selection, originally a first-round pick in the 2014 Supplemental Draft, from Chicago Fire in exchange for forward Quincy Amarikwa.)	(United States) Alex Sweetin	Midfielder	St. Louis
47	San Jose Earthquakes	(United States) A. J. Corrado	Midfielder	Indiana
48	Montreal Impact	(United States) Pete Caringi	Forward	UMBC; Baltimore Bohemians
49	Colorado Rapids	(United States) Tolani Ibikunle	Defender	Wake Forest; Reading United
50	New England Revolution	(France) Pierre Omanga	Forward	SNHU; GPS Portland Phoenix
51	Vancouver Whitecaps FC (Note: #51: Seattle Sounders FC → Vancouver Whitecaps FC. December 12, 2011: Vancouver Whitecaps FC acquired a third-round selection in the 2014 SuperDraft and the #14 selection in Stage 2 of the 2011 MLS Re-Entry Draft from Seattle Sounders FC in exchange for the #1 selection in Stage 2 of the 2011 MLS Re-Entry Draft. Seattle used the Re-Entry Draft pick to select defender Marc Burch.)	(Ghana) Michael Kafari	Midfielder	New Mexico; Austin Aztex
52	Philadelphia Union (Note: #52: Los Angeles Galaxy → Philadelphia Union. March 1, 2013: Philadelphia Union acquired a third-round selection in the 2014 SuperDraft, originally a conditional selection, in the 2014 SuperDraft from Los Angeles Galaxy in exchange for forward Chandler Hoffman.)	(United States) Aodhan Quinn	Midfielder	Akron; Seattle Sounders FC U-23
53	Real Salt Lake (Note: #53: New York Red Bulls → Real Salt Lake. February 20, 2013: Real Salt Lake acquired a third-round selection in the 2014 SuperDraft, originally a conditional pick in the Supplemental Draft pick, from New York Red Bulls in exchange for midfielder Jonny Steele.)	(United States) Joey Dillon	Midfielder	Georgetown; Michigan Bucks
54	Houston Dynamo	(United States) Michael Lisch	Goalkeeper	New Mexico; Austin Aztex
55	Seattle Sounders FC (Note: #55: Portland Timbers → Seattle Sounders FC. February 20, 2013: Seattle Sounders FC acquired a third-round selection in the 2014 SuperDraft, originally a first-round selection in the 2014 Supplemental Draft, and a conditional 2015 MLS SuperDraft pick from Portland Timbers in exchange for the MLS rights to defender Mikaël Silvestre.)	(Suriname) Stefano Rijssel	Forward	W Connection
56	D.C. United (Note: #56: Real Salt Lake → D.C. United. July 17, 2013: D.C. United acquired a third-round selection in the 2014 SuperDraft and a conditional selection in the 2015 MLS SuperDraft from Real Salt Lake in exchange for defender Brandon McDonald.)	(United States) Zach Barnes	Midfielder	Creighton; Portland Timbers U23
57	Sporting Kansas City	(Uruguay) Alex Martinez	Midfielder	NC State; Carolina Dynamo

=== Round 4 ===
Pick #	MLS team	Player	Position	Affiliation
58	Vancouver Whitecaps FC (Note: #58: D.C. United → Vancouver Whitecaps FC. February 28, 2013: Vancouver Whitecaps FC acquired a fourth-round selection in the 2014 SuperDraft from D.C. United in exchange for forward Kyle Porter.)	(Canada) Mackenzie Pridham	Forward	Cal Poly
59	Chivas USA	(United States) Michael Nwiloh	Defender	Georgia State
60	Toronto FC	(United States) Kene Eze	Forward	Rutgers
61	Chicago Fire (Note: #61: Columbus Crew → Chicago Fire. December 12, 2013: Chicago Fire acquired a fourth-round selection in the 2014 SuperDraft from Columbus Crew in exchange for midfielder Daniel Paladini.)	(United States) Zach Bolden	Midfielder	Denver
62	FC Dallas	(Ecuador) Ronny Santos Mendoza	Defender	Manta FC
63	Philadelphia Union	(Brazil) Luca Gimenez	Midfielder	Wake Forest
64	Vancouver Whitecaps FC	(Costa Rica) Michael Calderón	Midfielder	New Mexico
65	Chicago Fire	(United States) Kadeem Dacres	Forward	UMBC; Reading United
66	San Jose Earthquakes	(United States) Devante Dubose	Defender	Virginia Tech; Midland/Odessa Sockers
67	Montreal Impact	(Canada) Jordan Ongaro	Forward	San Diego State
68	Colorado Rapids	(Australia) Albert Edward	Defender	Lindsey Wilson College; Des Moines Menace
69	D.C. United (Note: #69: New England Revolution → D.C. United. August 9, 2013: D.C. United acquired the final natural selection of New England Revolution in the 2014 SuperDraft, which was this pick, in exchange for the MLS rights to forward Charlie Davies.)	(United States) Travis Golden	Defender	Campbell; Austin Aztex
70	Real Salt Lake (Note: #70: Seattle Sounders FC → Real Salt Lake. August 1, 2012: Real Salt Lake acquired a fourth-round selection in the 2014 SuperDraft, originally a conditional pick, from Seattle Sounders FC in exchange for the MLS rights to midfielder Mario Martínez.)	(United States) Daniel Jackson	Forward	Coker College; D.C. United U-23
71	Portland Timbers (Note: #71: Los Angeles Galaxy → Houston Dynamo → Portland Timbers. December 17, 2013: Portland Timbers acquired a fourth-round selection in the 2014 SuperDraft from Houston Dynamo in exchange for defender David Horst. On December 15, 2010, Houston had acquired this fourth-round selection from Los Angeles Galaxy in exchange for the fifth selection in Stage 2 of the 2010 MLS Re-Entry Draft. Los Angeles used the Re-Entry Draft pick to select forward Juan Pablo Ángel.)	(United States) Victor Chavez	Forward	UCLA; Ventura County Fusion
72	Los Angeles Galaxy (Note: #72: New York Red Bulls → Los Angeles Galaxy. July 13, 2012: Los Angeles Galaxy acquired a fourth-round selection in the 2014 SuperDraft, originally a second-round selection in the 2014 Supplemental Draft, from New York Red Bulls in exchange for goalkeeper Bill Gaudette.)	PASS		
73	Portland Timbers (Note: #73: Houston Dynamo → Portland Timbers. December 13, 2010: Portland Timbers acquired a fourth-round selection in the 2014 SuperDraft from Houston Dynamo in exchange for defender Jordan Graye.)	(United States) Nikita Kotlov	Midfielder	Indiana
74	San Jose Earthquakes (Note: #74: Portland Timbers → San Jose Earthquakes. September 5, 2013: San Jose Earthquakes acquired a fourth-round selection in the 2014 SuperDraft, originally a fourth-round selection in the 2014 Supplemental Draft, from Portland Timbers in exchange for midfielder Brad Ring. This pick was converted to a fourth-round selection in the SuperDraft when the Supplemental Draft was eliminated.)	(United States) Billy Knutsen	Goalkeeper	American
75	Chicago Fire (Note: #75: Real Salt Lake → Chicago Fire. June 27, 2012: Chicago Fire acquired a fourth-round selection in the 2014 SuperDraft from Real Salt Lake in exchange for defender Kwame Watson-Siriboe.)	(United States) Bryan Ciesiulka	Midfielder	Marquette; Chicago Fire Premier
76	Sporting Kansas City	(Costa Rica) Reinaldo Brenes	Forward	Akron; Portland Timbers U23s
77	Seattle Sounders FC (Note: #77: San Jose Earthquakes → Seattle Sounders FC. March 1, 2013: Seattle Sounders FC acquired a fourth-round selection in the 2014 Supplemental Draft from San Jose Earthquakes in exchange for midfielder Cordell Cato. MLS awarded Seattle this pick at the end of the 2014 SuperDraft after the Supplemental Draft was eliminated.)	(Brazil) Fabio Pereira	Midfielder	Michigan

== Unresolved 2014 SuperDraft Trades ==
- Conditional, Houston Dynamo → Toronto FC. December 28, 2011: Toronto FC acquired a conditional selection in the 2014 SuperDraft from Houston Dynamo in exchange for midfielder Nathan Sturgis.
- Round 6 (Supplemental Draft Round 4), FC Dallas → Columbus Crew. June 14, 2013: Columbus Crew acquired a fourth-round selection in the 2014 Supplemental Draft from FC Dallas in exchange for use of an international roster spot for 2013.

== Notable undrafted players ==
=== Homegrown players ===
Original MLS team	Player	Position	College	Conference	Notes
D.C. United	Jalen Robinson	Defender	Wake Forest	ACC	
Real Salt Lake	Jordan Allen	Midfielder	Virginia	ACC	
San Jose Earthquakes	Tommy Thompson	Forward	Indiana	Big Ten	
Seattle Sounders FC	Aaron Kovar	Midfielder	Stanford	Pac-12	
