= Santa Ynez Airport =

Airport in California, United States

Santa Ynez Airport Kunkle Field
- IATA: SQA; ICAO: KIZA; FAA LID: IZA

Summary
- Airport type: Public
- Serves: County of Santa Barbara
- Location: Santa Ynez
- Opened: October 29, 1947
- Elevation AMSL: 671 ft / 205 m
- Coordinates: 34°36′25″N 120°04′32″W

Map
- Location in California

Runways
Direction	Length		Surface
Direction	ft	m	Surface
8/26	2,804	855	Asphalt

Santa Ynez Airport (Kunkle Field) (IATA: SQA, ICAO: KIZA, FAA LID: IZA) is a public airport located one mile (2 km) southeast of the central business district of Santa Ynez, in the Santa Ynez Valley of Santa Barbara County, California, United States. The airport covers 125 acres (51 ha) and has one runway (08/26), measuring 2,804 x 75 ft. (854 x 23 m). The airport does not have a control tower but does offer some services, including 24-hour access to both 100LL and Jet A self-service fuel and tie-downs for transient aircraft.

Santa Ynez Airport is classified as a regional general aviation airport, and averaged 83 aircraft operations per day in 2015: 55% transient general aviation, 43% local general aviation, 1% air taxi, and <1% military. There are 112 aircraft based at the airport, including 15 gliders and 6 ultra-lights; the remaining aircraft are helicopters (5), single-engine airplanes (78), and the remaining 8 aircraft are multi-engine. There are no jets based at the airport.

== History ==
The Santa Ynez Airport was started in 1946 when a group of men from the Santa Ynez Valley asked the board of supervisors to purchase 155 acres in the valley to start a flying club. It was not until September 30, 1949, that the State of California, Division of Aeronautics issued the first permit allowing for flight operations to commence. In 1950, the landing strip was upgraded with a 2,000-foot (610-meter) asphalt runway and parallel taxiway. In 1954 runway lights were installed, and the following year saw the opening of the glider port. In 1957, the runway was lengthened by 800 feet (244 m) to its current length. Between 1963 and 1982, the airport maintained a fleet of blue 1958 Chevrolet Yeomans during the later years that one could, after tying down your airplane, simply walk over to, find the key in the ignition, and drive off to visit nearby Solvang and Buellton sites. The one thing necessary was to bring the car back with a full tank of gas. This legend became synonymous with the airport among frequent visitors to Santa Ynez as you would see many of these old cars around all the sites of this region as flying folks visited to enjoy a get-a-way.

Private aircraft owners use Santa Ynez as a hub for storing their plane as well as for refueling, and it is a popular stop-over airport for traveling private pilots. Santa Ynez Airport also serves as a staging ground for Santa Barbara County Sheriff's Department helicopters.
