= Fifi Baiden =

Ghanaian footballer (born 1991)

Personal information
- Full name: Kingsley Mensah Baiden
- Date of birth: November 11, 1991 (age 34)
- Place of birth: Ajumako, Ghana
- Height: 5 ft 7 in (1.70 m)
- Position: Midfielder

Youth career
- Right to Dream Academy
- 2007–2010: Dunn School

College career
| Years | Team | Apps | (Gls) |
| 2010–2013 | UC Santa Barbara Gauchos | 76 | (2) |

Senior career*
| Years | Team | Apps | (Gls) |
| 2014 | Columbus Crew | 1 | (0) |
| 2014 | → Dayton Dutch Lions (loan) | 2 | (0) |
| Total | | 3 | (0) |
- * Club domestic league appearances and goals

Kingsley Mensah "Fifi" Baiden (born November 11, 1991) is a Ghanaian former professional footballer.

== Early life and education ==
Baiden was born November 11, 1991, in Ajumako, Ghana. He was a member of Ghana-based Right to Dream Academy, which he joined around the age of 10. To help his family financially, Baiden would sell kerosene amongst other odd jobs. He describes his early life:

Growing up in Ghana was tough. I grew up in a poor household where food and education was scarce. Soccer was one of the gateways for poor children to create opportunities for themselves from that poor environment.

— Fifi Baiden

He earned a scholarship to Dunn School in Los Olivos, California for Fall 2007. With Dunn, he captured three straight MVP awards. He earned an athletic scholarship to the University of California, Santa Barbara and played four years of college soccer for the UC Santa Barbara Gauchos men's soccer team.

== Playing career ==
In January 2014, Baiden was drafted in the 3rd round (42nd overall) of the 2014 MLS SuperDraft by the Columbus Crew. He became the second Right to Dream Academy member to be drafted into MLS after former Dunn School and UCSB teammate Michael Tetteh. After playing for them in preseason, he was officially signed in February 2014.

Baiden made his professional debut on March 30, 2014, when he appeared on loan for the Columbus Crew's USL Pro affiliate club Dayton Dutch Lions in a 0–3 loss against New York Red Bulls Reserves.

Baiden would return to make one appearance for the Columbus Crew on May 31, 2014. In July 2014, he was placed on the season-ending injured reserve list due to a torn acetabular labrum. Baiden was waived at the conclusion of the season.

== Post-playing career ==
Baiden was named as a volunteer assistant coach with the UC Santa Barbara Gauchos men's soccer team in August 2015. He spent the 2015 season with the Gauchos as the team went 14-7-2 and advanced to the third round of the 2015 NCAA Division I men's soccer tournament, but Baiden was not listed on the coaching roster the following season.

He founded the non-profit Fifi Soccer Foundation and authored the book The Hope You Can Have.

He currently coaches multiple teams with Santa Barbara Soccer Club. He is a project manager with Public Works Alliance.

== Personal life ==
Baiden was named a Humanitarian Ambassador for MAP International in August 2014 for his efforts in the 2014 West African Ebola virus epidemic.
