= Ronny Santos =

Ecuadorian footballer (born 1995)

Personal information
- Full name: Ronny Marcelo Santos Mendoza
- Date of birth: 4 July 1995 (age 31)
- Place of birth: Pichincha, Ecuador
- Height: 1.93 m (6 ft 4 in)
- Position: Centre back

Youth career
- 2011–2013: Manta FC

Senior career*
Years	Team	Apps	(Gls)
2013–2015	Manta	43	(1)
2015–2017	Independiente Medellín	?	(?)
2016	→ El Nacional (loan)	?	(?)
2017	→ Real Cartagena (loan)	0	(0)
2017–2018	Atlético	23	(0)

International career
2015	Ecuador U20	2	(0)
- * Club domestic league appearances and goals as of 01:37, 1 January 2019 (UTC)

Ronny Marcelo Santos Mendoza (born 4 July 1995) is an Ecuadorian professional footballer who plays as a defender.

== Career ==
Mendoza played the 2013 season with Manta FC, before trialling with Major League Soccer where he was drafted 62nd in the 2014 MLS SuperDraft by FC Dallas, but the club opted against signing him and he returned to Manta.
