= Rodney Michael =

Sierra Leonean footballer (born 1999)

Personal information
- Date of birth: 10 August 1999 (age 27)
- Place of birth: Freetown, Sierra Leone
- Height: 1.73 m (5 ft 8 in)
- Position: Midfielder

Team information
- Current team: Nejmeh
- Number: 17

Youth career
- 2014–2017: Santa Barbara SC

College career
Years	Team	Apps	(Gls)
2017–2020	UC Santa Barbara Gauchos	59	(23)

Senior career*
Years	Team	Apps	(Gls)
2021–2022	South Georgia Tormenta	16	(1)
2022	Indy Eleven	9	(0)
2023	Mornar Bar	12	(0)
2023–2024	PO Xylotympou	23	(0)
2024–2025	Safa	24	(5)
2025–	Nejmeh	26	(0)

International career^{‡}
2023–	Sierra Leone	8	(1)
- * Club domestic league appearances and goals as of 16:13, 13 August 2026 (UTC) ‡ National team caps and goals as of 19 November 2024

Rodney Michael (born 10 August 1999) is a Sierra Leonean footballer who plays as a midfielder for Lebanese Premier League club Nejmeh and the Sierra Leone national team.

== Youth and college career ==
Michael played three seasons of high school soccer at Dunn School, been named 2016–17 California Gatorade Soccer Player of the Year, and led the Earwigs to the CIF Southern Section Championship in 2015 and 2017. Michael earned All-CIF honors all three seasons after scoring 74 goals and tallying 43 assists. Michael also played club soccer for USSDA side Santa Barbara Soccer Club from 2014 to 2017, helping the club to the 2016 U18 National Championship and earned Best-XI honors.

Michael attended the University of California, Santa Barbara in 2017 to play college soccer. Over four seasons with the Gauchos, Michael made 59 appearances, scoring 23 goals and tallying 15 assists. During his time at college, Michael earned accolades including Big West All-Freshman Team, All-Big West First Team and Big West Freshman of the Year in 2017, All-Big West First Team and All-Far West Region First Team in 2018, Top Drawer Soccer All-America Second Team and United Soccer Coaches All-Far West Region First Team in 2019. He didn't play a senior season due to the COVID-19 pandemic.

== Club career ==
Michael was tipped to be drafted in the 2021 MLS SuperDraft but wasn't one of the 86 picks. He spent time on trial with USL Championship side Pittsburgh Riverhounds in April 2021, but wasn't signed by the team.

Michael spent time with amateur USL League Two side South Georgia Tormenta 2 before planning to play his senior college season later in 2021. However, South Georgia Tormenta's professional USL League One side opted to offer him a professional contract, and he signed with the club on 7 June 2021. He made his professional debut on 19 June 2021, appearing as a 56th-minute substitute during a 3–1 win over Greenville Triumph. He netted his first professional goal on 30 June 2021, scoring Tormenta's lone goal in a 2–1 loss to Toronto FC II.

On 22 March 2022, Michael was transferred from Tormenta to USL Championship side Indy Eleven. He left Indy Eleven following their 2022 season.

Michael signed with FK Mornar of the Montenegrin First League in February 2023.

After having spent the 2024–25 season at Safa in the Lebanese Premier League, Michael moved to Nejmeh in August 2025.

== International career ==
Rodney was called up to the Sierra Leone national team for a set of 2023 Africa Cup of Nations qualification matches in September 2023.

== Personal life ==
Michael was born in Freetown, Sierra Leone to Edwin Michael and Mariam Dayeck, both of Lebanese origin, and has four siblings. In 2025, he was granted Lebanese citizenship and obtained a Lebanese passport.

== Career statistics ==
=== International ===
Scores and results list Sierra Leone's goal tally first, score column indicates score after each Michael goal.

List of international goals scored by Rodney Michael
No.	Date	Venue	Opponent	Score	Result	Competition
1	6 January 2024	Laurent Pokou Stadium, San Pédro, Ivory Coast	Ivory Coast	1–5	1–5	Friendly

== Honours ==
Nejmeh

- Lebanese FA Cup: 2025–26
