= Los Olivos School District =

School district in California, United States

Los Olivos Elementary School District

Location
- PO Box 208; Los Olivos, California 93441 United States

Other information
- Website: www.losolivosschool.org

Los Olivos Elementary School District is a public school district in Santa Barbara County, California, United States.

It operates a single school, Los Olivos Elementary School. The Olive Grove Charter School was previously affiliated with the school district, but is not anymore.
