= Adam Bedell =

American soccer player

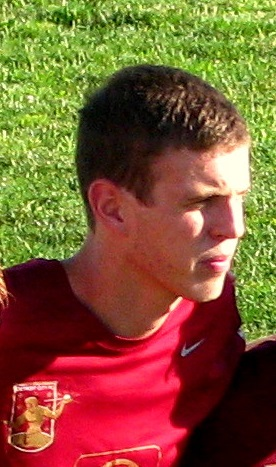
- Adam Bedell in 2012

Personal information
- Date of birth: December 1, 1991 (age 34)
- Place of birth: Livonia, Michigan, U.S.
- Height: 2.01 m (6 ft 7 in)
- Position: Forward

Youth career
- Crew Soccer Academy Wolves

College career
Years	Team	Apps	(Gls)
2010–2013	Detroit Mercy Titans		

Senior career*
Years	Team	Apps	(Gls)
2012–2013	Detroit City FC	15	(4)
2014–2015	Columbus Crew	16	(2)
2015	→ Austin Aztex (loan)	3	(0)
2015	→ Richmond Kickers (loan)	2	(0)
2015	Orlando City	0	(0)
2015	→ HB Køge (loan)	11	(2)
Total		47	(8)
- * Club domestic league appearances and goals as of November 17, 2015

Adam Bedell (born December 1, 1991) is an American former professional soccer player who played as a forward.

== Career ==
=== Early career ===
Born in Livonia, Michigan, Bedell played high school soccer at Winston Churchill High School and club soccer with the Michigan Crew Soccer Academy Wolves before attending the University of Detroit Mercy (UDM), where he played for the Detroit Mercy Titans. Bedell played in a purely defensive role at center back during his freshman and sophomore years at UDM before transitioning to a more attacking role at center midfield/forward for his junior and senior years. Despite spending only two years as a midfielder/forward, Bedell scored 23 goals and recorded 22 assists in his collegiate career as a Titan. In 2012, he was named the Horizon League Offensive Player of the Year and Horizon League Player of the Year in addition to an array of academic and athletic accolades. Bedell also played for Detroit City FC of the National Premier Soccer League in 2012 and 2013.

=== Columbus Crew ===
On January 21, 2014, it was announced that Bedell had been drafted in the 3rd round (45th overall) of the 2014 MLS SuperDraft by the Columbus Crew, and after playing for them in pre-season he was officially signed on March 7, 2014. Bedell scored his first professional goal at the 2014 Disney Pro Soccer Classic against Toronto FC and his first regular season goal on July 12, 2014, against the New York Red Bulls. On July 23, 2014, Bedell scored in an international friendly with Crystal Palace and again in the August 23, 2014 match with Houston Dynamo.

=== Orlando City ===
On August 6, 2015, Bedell was acquired by Orlando City from the Columbus Crew in exchange for a second-round pick in the 2016 MLS SuperDraft. He was released by Orlando at the end of the 2015 season.

==== HB Køge (loan) ====
On September 1, 2015, Bedell was loaned out to Danish side HB Køge until December 31, 2015. He scored a hat-trick in his debut in a 2015–16 Danish Cup match.

== Career statistics ==
As of March 8, 2014

Club	Season	League			MLS Cup		U.S. Open Cup		CONCACAF		Total	
Club	Season	Division	Apps	Goals	Apps	Goals	Apps	Goals	Apps	Goals	Apps	Goals
Columbus Crew	2014	MLS	16	2	1	—	1	0	—	—	18	2
Career total			16	2	1	0	1	0	0	0	18	2
