= Adnan Gabeljic =

American soccer player

Personal information
- Date of birth: 13 April 1992 (age 34)
- Place of birth: Zagreb, Croatia
- Height: 1.91 m (6 ft 3 in)
- Position: Forward

College career
Years	Team	Apps	(Gls)
2010–2013	Saint Louis Billikens		

Senior career*
Years	Team	Apps	(Gls)
2014	OKC Energy	2	(0)
2014	Rudeš	4	(0)
2015	Sacramento Republic	10	(0)
2016	San Francisco City	3	(0)
- * Club domestic league appearances and goals

Adnan Gabeljic (born 13 April 1992) is an American former soccer player who played as a forward.

== Club career ==
Before the 2014 season, Gabeljic was drafted by American top flight side Sporting KC. After that, he signed for OKC Energy FC in the American third tier, where he made two league appearances. On 5 May 2014, he debuted for OKC Energy FC during a 3–1 loss to Orlando City.

In 2014, Gabeljic signed for Croatian club Rudeš. Before the 2015 season, he signed for Sacramento Republic FC in the American third tier. Before the 2016 season, he signed for American fourth tier team San Francisco City FC.

== International career ==
Gabeljic was eligible to represent Croatia internationally, having been born there and Bosnia and Herzegovina internationally through his parents.
