= Dunn School, Los Olivos =

Private boarding and day school in Santa Ynez Valley, California

Coordinates: 34.66375°N 120.11076°W

The Dunn School
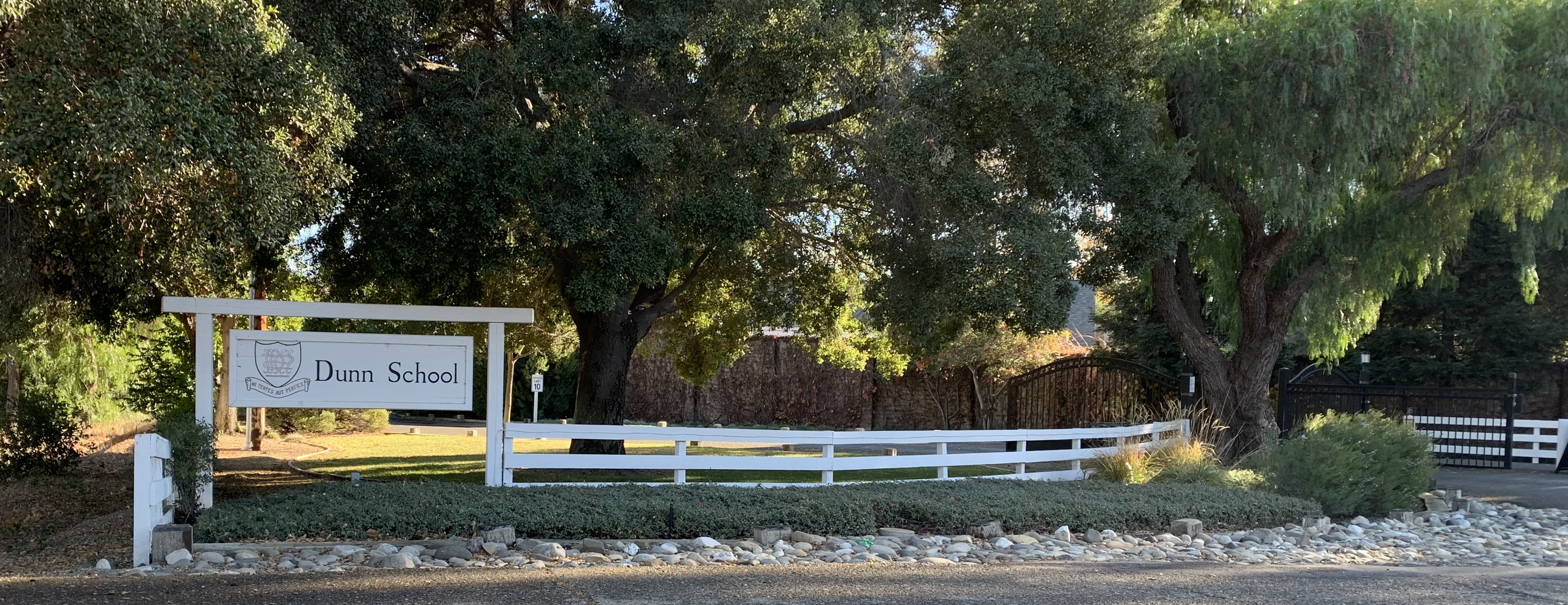
- Entrance to the school from California State Route 154

Location
- 2555 West Highway 154; Los Olivos, California 93441; United States

Information
- Type: Private, Boarding
- Motto: Ne Tentes Aut Perfice (All or Nothing)
- Established: 1957
- Headmaster: Kalyan Balaven
- Faculty: 65
- Enrollment: 250 total (co-ed); 60% boarding
- Average class size: 11 students
- Student to teacher ratio: 4:1
- Campus: Rural
- Campus size: 55 acres
- Colors: Black, Red, and Gray
- Athletics: 16 Interscholastic Sports
- Mascot: Earwig
- Tuition: $66,900 (Boarding)
- Website: www.dunnschool.org

Dunn School is a private, independent, boarding and day school for grades 6-12 located on 55 acres (22 ha) in Los Olivos, California, United States, in the Santa Ynez Valley. It was founded in 1957, by Tony Dunn under the name "The Valley School."

The school comprises a middle school, which serves 75 day students in grades 6–8, and an upper school (grades 9–12). Approximately 60% of the 175 upper school students board in on-campus dormitories. Total school enrollment is 250 students.

Dunn's motto is the Latin phrase Ne Tentes Aut Perfice, which translates to “All or Nothing.”

== History ==
Upon hiring headmaster Tony Dunn in June 1957, The Valley School was incorporated and opened in September that year with an enrollment of 49 children, including 15 girls and boys in nursery-kindergarten, 14 boarding boys in grades 7–10 and 20 coed day students in grades 1–8. The 6-acre (2.4 ha) site in Los Olivos was previously home to the Valley Farm School, which was founded in 1949 by Mr. and Mrs. Percy Hodges. In 1959, Valley School co-founder and parent Craig Hamilton wrote a proposal to name the school after Dunn, which was adopted prior to the 1960–61 school year. By 1964, Dunn School szx all-male and served grades 9–12. In 1970, girls were accepted as day students, and the school had its first two female graduates since 1962. The campus has been coeducational since.

== Accreditation & associations ==
Dunn School is a member of the National Association of Independent Schools (NAIS) and The Association of Boarding Schools (TABS). It is accredited by the Western Association of Schools and Colleges (WASC) and the California Association of Independent Schools (CAIS). Dunn is also partnered with the California Teacher Development Collaborative (CATDC) for professional development.

== Whole student education ==
Dunn School practices whole student education, sometimes referred to as holistic education, a movement that seeks to engage all aspects of the learner, including mind, body and spirit. Dunn teaches to its five core values: emotional wellness, physical readiness, intellectual growth, social responsibility and moral courage.

In 2021, Dunn Head of School Kalyan Balaven launched The Whole Student podcast, where guests recall whole student experiences of their own. The debut episode featured then-Santa Barbara mayoral candidate James Joyce III. Later episodes included author and former journalist Irshad Manji, Instagram VP of Engineering Maria Zhang, and physicist Tané Remington.

== Campus ==
The Dunn School campus sits along California State Route 154, which connects points of U.S. Route 101 by passing through the Los Padres National Forest. On-campus buildings include the Sinclaire Art Center, which features a painting studio, ceramic studio, and multimedia classroom for digital photography and film-making students. The athletic facilities include six tennis courts, four athletic fields, a pool, gymnasium, volleyball courts (indoor and outdoor), basketball courts (indoor and outdoor), running track, and rock climbing wall.

There are four student dormitories on campus: Senior Dorm, which was refurbished in 2002–03; Knoles Dorm, named for longtime faculty members Rose and Peter Knoles; Boone Dorm, named after alumnus and trustee Mike Boone; and the largest and lone girls residence Loy Dorm, named after former Head of School Steven Loy.

Additionally, there are 25 on-campus faculty residences, 40 classrooms, a science center with labs, Learning Strategies Center, performing arts theater, health center, and dining hall.

The Cindy Bronfman Leadership Center (CBLC), named for a former trustee and parent, opened in 2020. The CBLC is the hub of the leadership program and includes an innovation lab, a student-run café, a college counseling center and space for student study, reflection and collaboration. As announced in 2022, the CBLC will also be home to the Bob Jurgensen Entrepreneurship Major.

== Dunn Middle School ==
Established in 1978, Dunn Middle School shares the same campus as the upper school but operates under its own motto, “Carpe Diem.” The middle school participates in outdoor education trips throughout the year, starting with a traditional all-school camping trip in Big Sur the 2nd day of school. The ‘Piece of Cake’ annual bike ride requires students to complete a 40+ mile round-trip ride to Los Alamos.

== Learning strategies ==
Established in 1973, Dunn's Learning Strategies program provides individualized support for students with cognitive differences. The program offers two levels of support in the learning center: one-to-one learning strategies and executive group.

In the One to One Program, students are paired with a learning strategies specialist and will meet with him/her individually four times per week. In the Executive Group Program, students meet with their Learning Strategies specialist in a small group setting.

== Inclusion ==
In 2021, Dunn Head of School Kalyan Balaven founded the Inclusion Lab of Santa Barbara County, a joint collaboration between public and independent schools in Santa Barbara County with the expressed purpose of progressing inclusion efforts across the board.

The Lab establishes professional development opportunities for educators within the County borders and beyond. Its first development opportunity was a workshop with author Irshad Manji in Jan. 2022 entitled Inclusion Through Moral Courage.

== Academic ==
Classes average 11 students, and are taught seminar-style by teachers. Students enroll in a minimum of five academic classes each semester.

== Athletics ==
Dunn School is a member of the Tri-County Athletic Association, a high school athletic conference that competes within the CIF Southern Section. The Dunn athletic teams are nicknamed the Earwigs. Adopted in the 1970s, the nickname's origin is attributed to an urban legend describing a rush of earwigs exiting a building on campus in its earliest days.

=== Varsity sports ===
Fall

- Cross Country (boys and girls)
- Tennis (girls)
- Volleyball (girls)
- Fall Baseball (boys)
- Ultimate Frisbee (coed)

Winter

- Soccer (boys and girls)
- Basketball (boys and girls)

Spring

- Track & Field (boys and girls)
- Baseball (boys)
- Tennis (boys)
- Volleyball (boys)

== Notable alumni ==
- Abu Danladi
- Ru Kuwahata
- King Gyan
- Fifi Baiden
- Yoky Matsuoka
- Rodney Michael
- Michael Tetteh
- Manu Duah

== Heads of school ==
Number	Name	Years
1st	Tony Dunn	1957–1967
2nd	William Webb	1967–1975
3rd	Nicholas Thacher (Interim)	1975–1976
4th	Edward Simmons	1976–1982
5th	Steven Loy	1982–1992
6th	Eric Ruoss	1992–1996
7th	James Munger	1996–2008
8th	Mike Beck	2008–2021
9th	Kalyan Balaven	2021–Present
