= Los Olivos, California =

Unincorporated community in Santa Barbara County, California, US

Los Olivos
- unincorporated community census-designated place
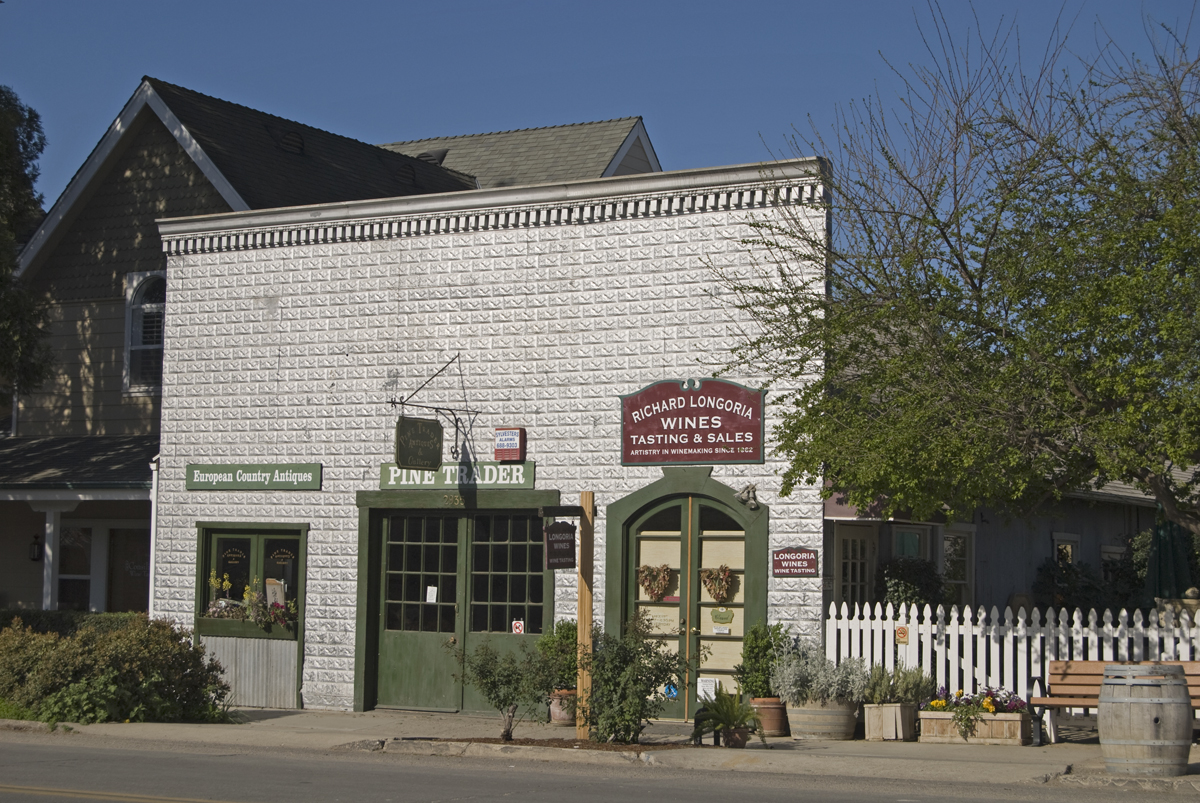
- Downtown Los Olivos
- Interactive map of Los Olivos
- Position in California
- Coordinates: 34°39′50″N 120°07′03″W
- Country: United States
- State: California
- County: Santa Barbara

Area
  - Total: 2.618 sq mi (6.780 km^{2})
  - Land: 2.617 sq mi (6.779 km^{2})
  - Water: 0.00039 sq mi (0.001 km^{2}) 0.02%
- Elevation: 807 ft (246 m)

Population (2020)
  - Total: 1,202
  - Density: 459.2/sq mi (177.3/km^{2})
- Time zone: UTC-8 (Pacific (PST))
  - Summer (DST): UTC−7 (PDT)
- ZIP Code: 93441
- Area code: 805
- GNIS feature ID: 2583064

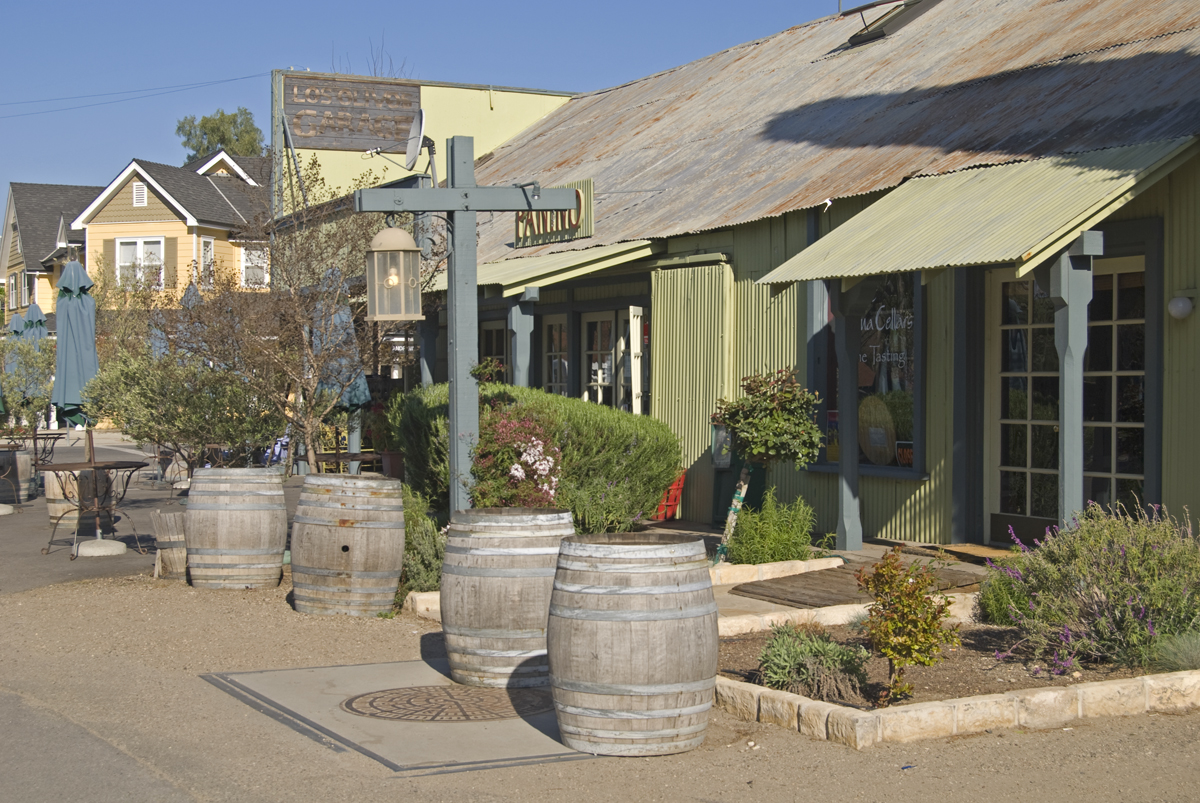
Shops in Los Olivos

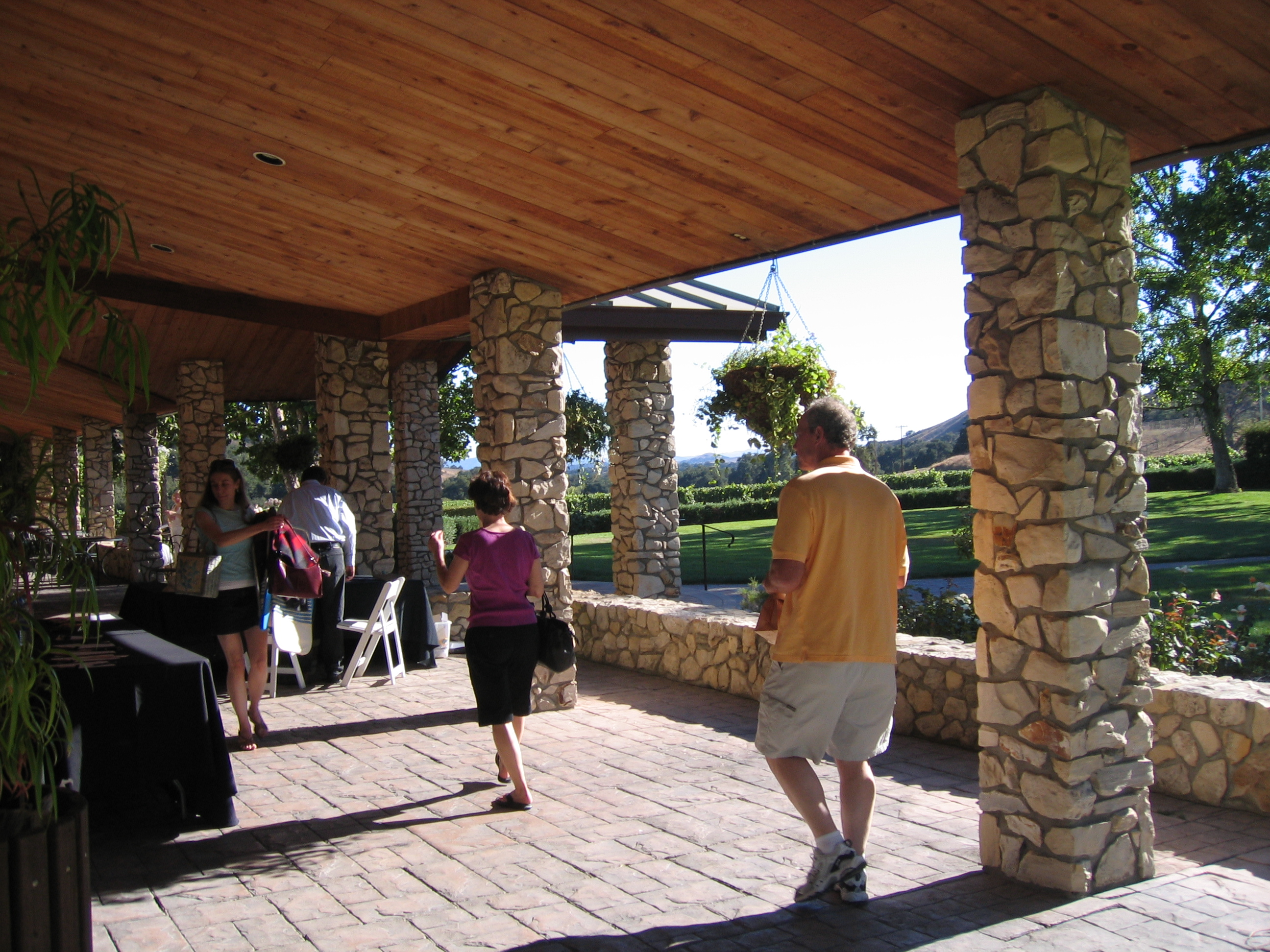
Fess Parker winery, Los Olivos

Los Olivos (/loʊs oʊˈliːvoʊs/; Spanish for "the olive trees") is an unincorporated community in the Santa Ynez Valley of Santa Barbara County, California, United States. Tourism is popular in this rural area which is an agricultural region with an emphasis on wine grapes. For statistical purposes, the United States Census Bureau has defined Los Olivos as a census-designated place (CDP). The population was 1,202 at the 2020 census. The ZIP Code is 93441, and the community is within the area code 805.

== Geography ==
Los Olivos is a community in the Santa Ynez Valley, which is in the northern half of Santa Barbara County, California. It is one of six towns in the valley, along with Buellton to the west, Los Alamos to the northwest, Santa Ynez to the southeast, Ballard to the south, and Solvang south of Ballard. The town is located on California State Route 154. Alamo Pintado Road goes south from Los Olivos into Ballard and then Solvang. The census definition of the area was created by the Census Bureau for statistical purposes and may not precisely correspond to local understanding of the area with the same name.

== History ==
Sometime around 1880, on a bluff overlooking Alamo Pintado Creek, just north of the town of Ballard, a two-story house was built, with a wide, covered front porch and neatly symmetrical arched windows in the center gable, situated on prime farmland. It became the property of twenty-two-year-old Alden March Boyd, of Albany, New York, when he paid $8,000 for "157 acres, more or less, together with the dwelling house," in 1885. He planted five thousand olive trees, and called it Rancho De Los Olivos. The 1880s were a boom time for California. On November 16, 1887, the Pacific Coast Railway line extension from Los Alamos was completed. The developers of the narrow-gauge railway first named their town El Olivar, then El Olivos, and finally Los Olivos, after Boyd's nearby ranch.

Los Olivos was connected by the narrow gauge railroad to points north as far as San Luis Obispo until the train made its last run in 1934. The southern terminus of the railroad was in front of Mattei's Tavern, where a stagecoach line continued over San Marcos Pass into Santa Barbara.

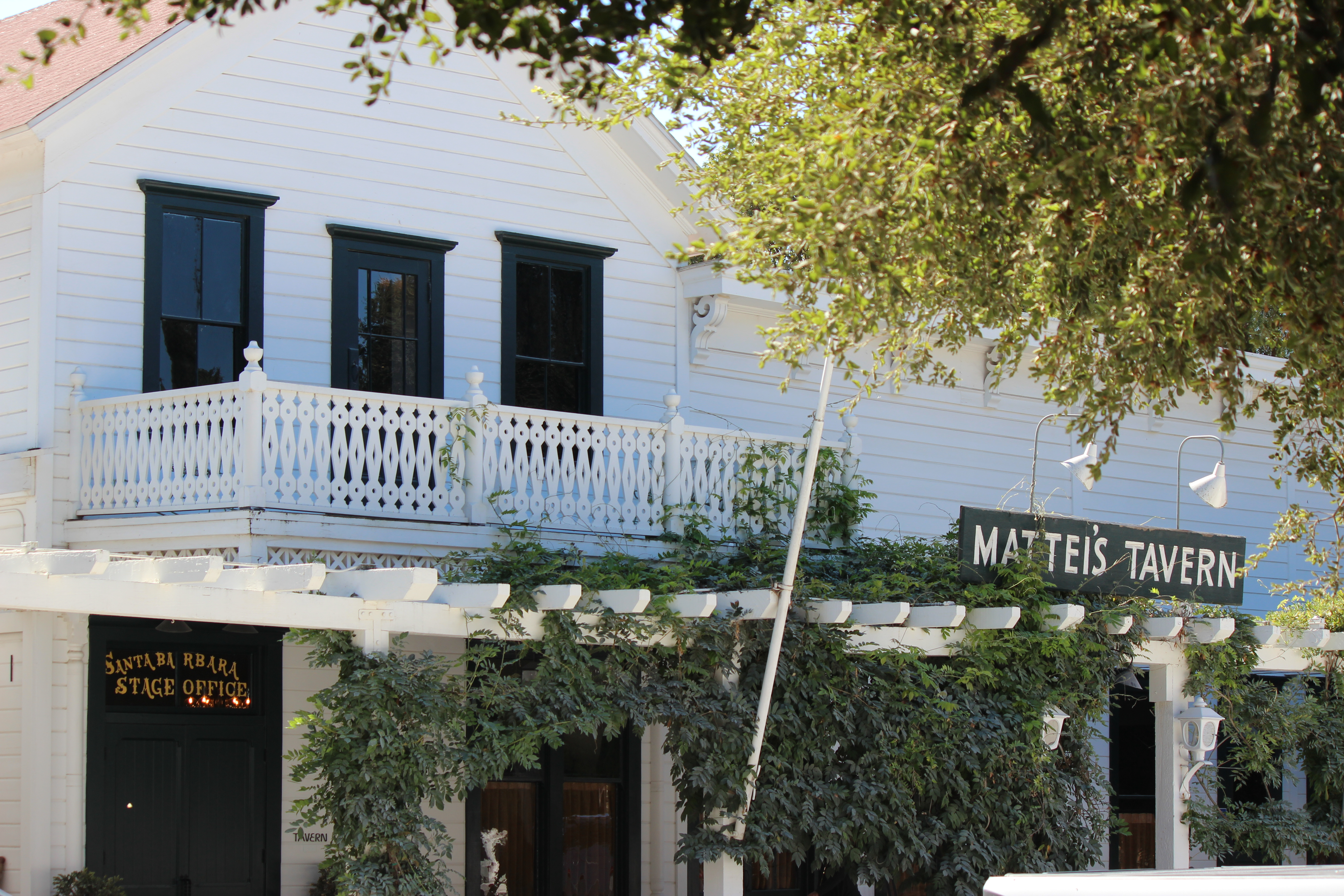
Mattei's Tavern, southern terminus of the Pacific Coast Railway.

== Demographics ==
Historical population
Census	Pop.	Note	%±
2010	1,132		—
2020	1,202		6.2%
U.S. Decennial Census; 1860–1870 1880-1890; 1900 1910 1920; 1930 1940 1950; 1960 1970 1980; 1990 2000 2010; 2020

Los Olivos first appeared as a census designated place in the 2010 U.S. census.

=== Racial and ethnic composition ===
Los Olivos CDP, California – Racial and ethnic composition Note: the US Census treats Hispanic/Latino as an ethnic category. This table excludes Latinos from the racial categories and assigns them to a separate category. Hispanics/Latinos may be of any race.
Race / Ethnicity (NH = Non-Hispanic)	Pop 2010	Pop 2020	% 2010	% 2020
White alone (NH)	976	940	86.22%	78.20%
Black or African American alone (NH)	1	0	0.09%	0.00%
Native American or Alaska Native alone (NH)	2	5	0.18%	0.42%
Asian alone (NH)	12	7	1.06%	0.58%
Native Hawaiian or Pacific Islander alone (NH)	4	0	0.35%	0.00%
Other race alone (NH)	2	12	0.18%	1.00%
Mixed race or Multiracial (NH)	10	37	0.88%	3.08%
Hispanic or Latino (any race)	125	201	11.04%	16.72%
Total	1,132	1,202	100.00%	100.00%

=== 2020 census ===
As of the 2020 census, Los Olivos had a population of 1,202. The population density was 459.3 inhabitants per square mile (177.3/km^{2}). The median age was 49.4 years. For every 100 females, there were 92.3 males, and for every 100 females age 18 and over, there were 85.9 males age 18 and over.

The census reported that 1,124 people (93.5% of the population) lived in households, 78 (6.5%) lived in non-institutionalized group quarters, and no one was institutionalized. 0.0% of residents lived in urban areas, while 100.0% lived in rural areas.

There were 422 households, out of which 111 (26.3%) had children under the age of 18 living in them, 239 (56.6%) were married-couple households, 23 (5.5%) were cohabiting couple households, 93 (22.0%) had a female householder with no partner present, and 67 (15.9%) had a male householder with no partner present. 100 households (23.7%) were one person, and 53 (12.6%) were one person aged 65 or older. The average household size was 2.66. There were 293 families (69.4% of all households).

The age distribution was 230 people (19.1%) under the age of 18, 83 people (6.9%) aged 18 to 24, 233 people (19.4%) aged 25 to 44, 363 people (30.2%) aged 45 to 64, and 293 people (24.4%) who were 65 years of age or older.

There were 474 housing units at an average density of 181.1 units per square mile (69.9 units/km^{2}), of which 422 (89.0%) were occupied. Of these, 307 (72.7%) were owner-occupied, and 115 (27.3%) were occupied by renters. Of all housing units, 11.0% were vacant; the homeowner vacancy rate was 1.6%, and the rental vacancy rate was 7.1%.

== Economy and tourism ==
Los Olivos is known for its wineries and tasting rooms. Starting in Los Olivos and stretching north is the Foxen Canyon Wine Trail.

There are a number of large thoroughbred horse ranches in the area. Mattei's Tavern, a former stagecoach stop, is a restaurant.

== Education ==
The Los Olivos School District operates Los Olivos Elementary School.

There are two private college-prep schools, Dunn School and Midland School. Dunn School is located along SR 154 and has both boarding and day students. Midland School is located on Figueroa Mountain Road and has only boarding students.

== Climate ==
Under the Köppen Climate Classification, "dry-summer subtropical" climates are often referred to as "Mediterranean". Los Olivos has a mean yearly temperature of 61.6 °F (16.4 °C). The average high temperature in the summer months is 92 °F (33.3 °C), while the average low temperature in the winter months is 39.5 °F (4.2 °C). Summers are dry with little to no rain falling from June through September. Winters are mild and wet with the majority of the yearly precipitation (nearly 80%) falling from December through March.

== In popular culture ==
In May 1986, Los Olivos was used as the location setting for the fictional town of "Mayberry" in the made-for-TV movie Return to Mayberry, based on the popular 1960s sitcom The Andy Griffith Show. Several locations in Los Olivos were featured in the 2004 movie Sideways highlighting Santa Barbara county's viticulture. The Los Olivos Grand Hotel, built in 1985, is now Fess Parker's Wine Country Inn, owned by the family of former Daniel Boone and Davy Crockett star Fess Parker (1924–2010). Parker and his wines were featured on the NBC daytime drama Santa Barbara (first episode of Season Two) of James May and Oz Clarke's Big Wine Adventure. Episodes of The Bachelor were filmed in Los Olivos.

Portions of the 1983 video for the song "Say Say Say", with Michael Jackson and Paul McCartney, were filmed at Sycamore Ranch, five miles (8 km) from the town. According to La Toya Jackson, the McCartneys were staying at Sycamore Ranch during the filming. At the time, Jackson expressed interest in someday buying the property. In 1988, he would do so, renaming it Neverland Ranch.

== Notable people ==
US President Ronald Reagan lived about 9 miles (14 km) south at Rancho del Cielo. Musician Michael Jackson's property Neverland Ranch is located about 5 miles (8.0 km) north.
