= Matt Wiet =

American former soccer player (born 1990)

Personal information
- Full name: Matthew Wiet
- Date of birth: September 23, 1990 (age 36)
- Place of birth: Columbus, Ohio, United States
- Height: 5 ft 11 in (1.80 m)
- Position: Defender

Youth career
- 2008–2009: Columbus Crew
- 2009: Indiana Hoosiers
- 2010–2012: UCLA Bruins

Senior career*
Years	Team	Apps	(Gls)
2011–2013	Ventura County Fusion	17	(1)
2013	Dayton Dutch Lions	4	(0)
2014	Columbus Crew	0	(0)
2014	→ Dayton Dutch Lions (loan)	19	(0)

International career
2009	United States U20	1	(0)
- * Club domestic league appearances and goals

Matthew Wiet (born September 23, 1990) is an American former soccer player who last played for the Columbus Crew in Major League Soccer.

== Career ==
=== Youth, college and amateur ===
Wiet attended Worthington Kilbourne High School, where he was named a two-time All-Ohio and All-District honoree and OSSCA First Team selection. He also played for the Crew Soccer Academy, reaching the U.S. Soccer Under-18 Development Academy National Tournament Semifinals, finishing the 2008 campaign ranked third nationally. Wiet began his college soccer at Indiana University in 2010, before transferring to UCLA in 2011. At Indiana Wiet was named to the 2009 Big Ten All-Freshman Team after making 20 starts for the Hoosiers. At UCLA he started on the back line for three years and was the three-time recipient of NSCAA All-Region honors.

During his time at UCLA, Wiet also appeared for USL Premier Development League club Ventura County Fusion.

=== Professional ===
Wiet signed his first professional contract with USL Pro club Dayton Dutch Lions on July 3, 2013, where he would go on to make four first-team appearances.

On November 26, 2013, Wiet signed a homegrown contract with Major League Soccer club Columbus Crew.

=== International ===
Wiet also made an appearance for the U.S. under-20 national team on July 2, 2009, in a 1–1 draw with Egypt.
