= 2011 Columbus Crew season =

Columbus Crew
2011 season
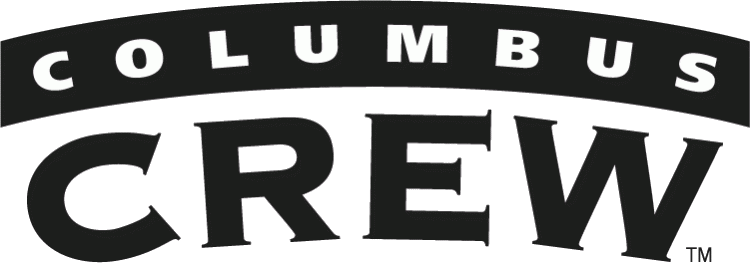
- Investor-operators: Clark Hunt; Dan Hunt; Lamar Hunt Jr. Sharron Hunt Munson; Ron Pizzuti and a group of local investors
- Head Coach: Robert Warzycha
- Stadium: Columbus Crew Stadium
- Major League Soccer: Conference: 4th Overall: 9th
- MLS Cup playoffs: Wildcard round
- U.S. Open Cup: Third round
- CONCACAF Champions League: Quarterfinals
- Top goalscorer: League: Andrés Mendoza (13); All: Andrés Mendoza (13)
- Highest home attendance: 21,203 (9/24 v. LA)
- Lowest home attendance: 1,845 (6/28 v. RIC)
- Average home league attendance: 12,185 (64.3%)
- Biggest win: CLB 4–1 COL (6/26); NE 0-3 CLB (10/15)
- Biggest defeat: SEA 6-2 CLB (8/27)
Home colors	Away colors

The 2011 Columbus Crew season was the club's 16th season of existence and their 16th consecutive season in Major League Soccer, the top flight of soccer in the United States and Canada. The first match of the season was on March 19 against D.C. United. It was the third season under head coach Robert Warzycha.

== Review ==
The Crew opened its 2011 campaign with a Champions League quarterfinal fixture against fellow MLS competitor, Real Salt Lake. The match, the first leg of a quarterfinal series, was at Columbus Crew Stadium on February 22, 2011 and ended in a 0-0 draw. Columbus was trying to advance past the Quarterfinal stage after falling to Toluca 5-4 on aggregate last season.

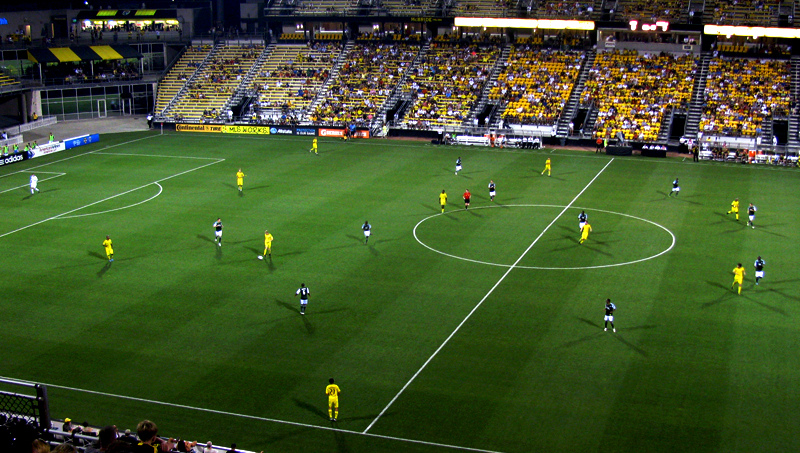
The Crew playing the Portland Timbers on July 23, 2011.

On March 1, Columbus traveled to Rio Tinto Stadium and fell to Real Salt Lake by a score of 4-1, thus ending the Crew's run in the 2010–11 CONCACAF Champions League.

Two and a half weeks later, Columbus opened up its Major League Soccer campaign by traveling to Washington, D.C. to take on D.C. United on March 19. The club's MLS home opener was one week later, when the Crew hosted Red Bull New York on March 26.

== Roster ==
As of September 3, 2011.

Note: Flags indicate national team as defined under FIFA eligibility rules; some limited exceptions apply. Players may hold more than one non-FIFA nationality.

No.	Pos.	Nation	Player
1	GK	USA	William Hesmer
2	DF	USA	Rich Balchan
3	DF	USA	Josh Williams
5	DF	USA	Danny O'Rourke
6	MF	CMR	Tony Tchani
7	MF	VEN	Bernardo Añor (INT)
9	FW	IRQ	Justin Meram
10	FW	PER	Andrés Mendoza (INT; DP)
11	MF	USA	Dilly Duka
12	MF	USA	Eddie Gaven
14	DF	USA	Chad Marshall (captain)
15	MF	USA	Kevin Burns
16	DF	USA	Eric Gehrig (SUP)
17	MF	NGR	Emmanuel Ekpo
18	MF	USA	Robbie Rogers

No.	Pos.	Nation	Player
19	MF	USA	Cole Grossman
20	FW	VEN	Emilio Rentería (INT)
21	DF	CHI	Sebastián Miranda (INT)
22	MF	SRB	Dejan Rusmir (INT)
23	DF	USA	Korey Veeder (SUP)
24	DF	USA	Ben Sippola (SUP)
25	GK	USA	Alex Riggs (SUP)
26	DF	TTO	Julius James
27	FW	USA	Aaron Horton (HGP; SUP)
28	MF	ARG	Santiago Prim (INT; SUP)
29	DF	JAM	Shaun Francis (INT)
30	GK	USA	Andy Gruenebaum
31	MF	USA	Josh Gardner
32	FW	USA	Tom Heinemann
33	FW	USA	Jeff Cunningham

== Technical Staff ==
Position	Staff
President/General Manager	(United States) Mark McCullers
Technical Director	(United States) Brian Bliss
Head Coach	(Poland) Robert Warzycha
Assistant Coach	(Argentina) Ricardo Iribarren
Assistant Coach	(United States) Mike Lapper
Goalkeeper Coach	(Russia) Vadim Kirillov
Strength/Fitness Coach	(United States) Mike Tremble
Athletic Trainer	(United States) David Lagow
Assistant Trainer	(United States) Skylar Richards
Director of Team Operations	(United States) Tucker Walther
Equipment Manager	(United States) Rusty Wummel

Source: []

== Non-competitive ==
=== Preseason ===
The Crew started preseason in Columbus and played games in Arizona, Tennessee and Georgia before returning to Ohio. The Crew brought in the following trialists during training camp: Caleb Patterson-Sewell, Mark Blades, Neri Bandiera, Pat McAfee, Ray Burse, Alex Fraga, Alex Riggs, Josh Gardner and Eric Gehrig.

Unsigned draft picks Rich Balchan, Justin Meram, Cole Grossman, Bernardo Añor, Ben Sippola and Andy Adlard also joined the team for preseason.

February 5 Friendly	Columbus Crew	2–2	Sporting Kansas City	Phoenix, AZ
1:00 PM EST	Fraga; Rogers (pen.)	Report	Jewsbury: Kamara	Stadium: Reach 11 Sports Complex; Referee: Alex Prus

February 8 Friendly	Columbus Crew	1–2	Vancouver Whitecaps FC	Phoenix, AZ
2:00 PM EST	Gaven 76' (pen.)	Report	Harris 62'; Salgado 77'	Stadium: Reach 11 Sports Complex

February 10 Friendly	Columbus Crew	3–0	Seattle Sounders FC	Phoenix, AZ
1:00 PM EST	Mendoza 20'; Scott 106+' (o.g.); Cunningham 108+'	Report		Stadium: Westside Complex
Note: Played with two 45-minute periods, plus 1 30 minute period

February 14 Friendly	Columbus Crew	0–2	Colorado Rapids	Phoenix, AZ
5:30 PM EST		Report	Nyassi 66'; Emory 77'	Stadium: Reach 11 Sports Complex

February 17 Friendly	Columbus Crew	2–4	Houston Dynamo	Phoenix, AZ
1:00 PM EST	Mendoza (yellow card) 18' (yellow-red card) 18'; Ekpo (yellow card) 36'; Meram 78' 95'	Report	Cruz 8'; Taylor (yellow card) 31'; Weaver (yellow card) 33'; Davis (yellow card) 38'; Robinson 52'; Palmer (red card) 58'; Watson (red card) 64'; Ching 91'; Garey 104' (pen.)	Stadium: Reach 11 Sports Complex
Note: Played in three 40-minute periods

March 6 Friendly	Columbus Crew	1–2	New England Revolution	Chattanooga, TN
4:00 PM EST	Sippola (yellow card) 76'; Heinemann 90+'	Report	Nyassi (yellow card) 12', (goal) 43'; Schilawski 81'	Stadium: Finley Stadium

March 9 Atlanta Pro Soccer Challenge	Columbus Crew	3–1	New England Revolution	Kennesaw, GA
7:30 PM EST	Añor 16'; Heinemann 17', 53'	Report	Stolica 62'; Coria (yellow card) 78'; Soares (yellow card) 90'	Stadium: Kennesaw State University Soccer Stadium; Referee: Hilario Grajeda

March 11 Atlanta Pro Soccer Challenge	Columbus Crew	1–0	Houston Dynamo	Kennesaw, GA
7:30 EST	Mendoza 34'; Duka (yellow card) 48'; Rusmir (yellow card) 58'	Report	Sarkodie (yellow card) 36'	Stadium: Kennesaw State University Soccer Stadium; Referee: Hilario Grajeda; Assistant referees: Anthony Vasoli; Claudio Badea; Fourth official: Mark Cleland
Note: Columbus won the Atlanta Pro Soccer Challenge round-robin tournament title with a 2-0 record.

=== Midseason ===
April 2 Friendly	Columbus Crew	2-0	Saint Louis Billikens	Columbus, OH
	5' (o.g.); Grossman 34'; Meram (yellow card) 58'	Report	Briggs (yellow card) 27'; Robson (yellow card) 57'	Stadium: Columbus Crew Stadium

April 17 Friendly	Columbus Crew	1-0	Louisville Cardinals	Columbus, OH
	Heinemann 35'; Iro (yellow card) 50'	Report		Stadium: Columbus Crew Stadium

July 26 Friendly	Columbus Crew	0–3	Newcastle United F.C.	Columbus, OH
7:30 PM EDT	Gruenebaum (red card) 45'	Report	Ameobi 9'; Coloccini 53'; Tioté (yellow card) 56'; Vučkić 90+'	Stadium: Columbus Crew Stadium; Attendance: 11,224; Referee: Michael Kennedy; Assistant referees: Paul Scott; Bill Dittmar; Fourth official: Chico Grajeda

== Competitive ==
=== Overview ===
Competition	First match	Last match	Starting round	Final position	Record							
Competition	First match	Last match	Starting round	Final position	Pld	W	D	L	GF	GA	GD	Win %
Major League Soccer	March 19, 2011	October 22, 2011	Matchday 1	9th	34	13	8	13	43	44	−1	38.24
MLS Cup Playoffs	October 27, 2011	October 27, 2011	Wildcard Match	Wildcard Match	1	0	0	1	0	1	−1	0.00
U.S. Open Cup	June 28, 2011	June 28, 2011	Third Round	Third Round	1	0	0	1	1	2	−1	0.00
CONCACAF Champions League	February 22, 2011	March 11, 2011	Quarterfinals	Quarterfinals	2	0	1	1	1	4	−3	0.00
Total					38	13	9	16	45	51	−6	34.21

Source: Competitions

=== MLS ===
==== Standings ====
===== Eastern Conference =====
Pos	Team	Pld	W	L	T	GF	GA	GD	Pts	Qualification
2	Houston Dynamo	34	12	9	13	45	41	+4	49	Qualification for the conference semifinals
3	Philadelphia Union	34	11	8	15	44	36	+8	48	Qualification for the conference semifinals
4	Columbus Crew	34	13	13	8	43	44	−1	47	Qualification for the play-in round
5	New York Red Bulls	34	10	8	16	50	44	+6	46	Qualification for the play-in round
6	Chicago Fire	34	9	9	16	46	45	+1	43	

Source: MLS

===== Overall table =====
Pos	Team	Pld	W	L	T	GF	GA	GD	Pts
7	Colorado Rapids	34	12	9	13	44	41	+3	49
8	Philadelphia Union	34	11	8	15	44	36	+8	48
9	Columbus Crew	34	13	13	8	43	44	−1	47
10	New York Red Bulls	34	10	8	16	50	44	+6	46
11	Chicago Fire	34	9	9	16	46	45	+1	43

Source: MLS
Rules for classification: 1) points; 2) head-to-head record; 3) goal difference; 4) number of goals scored

==== Results summary ====
Overall								Home						Away					
Pld	Pts	W	L	T	GF	GA	GD	W	L	T	GF	GA	GD	W	L	T	GF	GA	GD
34	47	13	13	8	43	44	−1	9	3	5	27	18	+9	4	10	3	16	26	−10

Last updated: November 6, 2011
Source: MLSSoccer.com
Pld = Matches played; Pts = Points; W = Matches won; T = Matches tied; L = Matches lost; GF = Goals for; GA = Goals against; GD = Goal difference

==== Results by round ====
Round	1	2	3	4	5	6	7	8	9	10	11	12	13	14	15	16	17	18	19	20	21	22	23	24	25	26	27	28	29	30	31	32	33	34
Stadium	A	H	H	A	H	A	H	H	A	A	H	A	H	H	A	H	A	A	H	A	H	A	A	H	H	A	H	H	A	H	A	H	A	A
Result	L	T	W	T	W	T	W	T	L	L	T	T	W	L	W	W	L	W	T	L	W	W	L	W	W	L	L	T	L	L	L	W	W	L

Updated to match(es) played on November 5, 2011. Source: MLS Results and League table
A = Away; H = Home; W = Win; L = Loss; T = Tie

==== Match results ====
March 19 1	D.C. United	3–1	Columbus Crew	Washington, D.C.
7:30 PM EDT	Burch (yellow card) 38'; Wolff 51', (yellow card) 52'; Davies 63' (pen.), 76'	Report	Duka (yellow card) 16'; Rogers 82' (pen.)	Stadium: RFK Stadium; Attendance: 18,402; Referee: Mark Geiger; Assistant referees: Eric Boria; Sean Hurd; Fourth official: Landis Wiley

March 26 2	Columbus Crew	0–0	New York Red Bulls	Columbus, OH
4:00 PM EDT		Report	Keel (yellow card) 29'; Miller (yellow card) 89'	Stadium: Columbus Crew Stadium; Attendance: 10,306; Referee: Abiodun Okulaja; Assistant referees: Jason Cullum; Brian Poeschel; Fourth official: Sorin Stoica

April 1 3	Columbus Crew	2–0	FC Dallas	Columbus, OH
7:30 PM EDT	Ekpo (yellow card) 20'; Rusmir (yellow card) 42'; Mendoza 54' (pen.); Burns (yellow card) 88'; Gaven 91'	Report	Gonçalves (yellow card) 32' (yellow-red card) 33'	Stadium: Columbus Crew Stadium; Attendance: 14,549; Referee: Jair Marrufo; Assistant referees: C.J. Morgante; Corey Rockwell; Fourth official: Jasen Anno

April 9 4	Chivas USA	0–0	Columbus Crew	Carson, CA
10:30 PM EDT	Mondaini (yellow card) 35'; Valentin (yellow card) 59'; Flores (yellow card) 65'; LaBrocca (yellow card) 86'; Lahoud (yellow card) 87'	Report	James (yellow card) 55'; Burns (yellow card) 64'; Miranda (yellow card) 81'	Stadium: The Home Depot Center; Attendance: 13,385; Referee: Yader Rayes; Assistant referees: Peter Manikowski; Claudiu Badea; Fourth official: Alejandro Mariscal

April 16 5	Columbus Crew	1–0	Sporting Kansas City	Columbus, OH
7:30 PM EDT	Rogers 53'	Report	Júlio César (yellow card) 50' (red card) 72'; Harrington (yellow card) 55'; Thomas (yellow card) 76'	Stadium: Columbus Crew Stadium; Attendance: 7,695; Referee: Juan Guzman; Assistant referees: Ian Anderson; Kevin Duliba; Fourth official: Baldomero Toledo

April 23 6	Toronto FC	1–1	Columbus Crew	Toronto, ON
4:00 PM EDT	Tchani (yellow card) 31', (goal) 41', (red card) 42'	Report	Burns (yellow card) 36'; Rentería 49'; Ekpo (yellow card) 39'; James (yellow card) 80'; Rusmir (yellow card) 90'	Stadium: BMO Field; Referee: David Gantar; Assistant referees: Joe Fletcher; Philippe Brière; Fourth official: Paul Ward

April 30 7	Columbus Crew	2–1	Vancouver Whitecaps FC	Columbus, OH
7:30 PM EDT	Rentería 50', 59'	Report	Leathers (yellow card) 37'; Janicki (yellow card) 57'; Salgado 69', (yellow card) 90+1'	Stadium: Columbus Crew Stadium; Attendance: 11,298; Referee: Terry Vaughn; Assistant referees: Adam Wienckowski; Jason Cullum; Fourth official: Ismail Elfath

May 7 8	Columbus Crew	1–1	Seattle Sounders FC	Columbus, OH
7:30 PM EDT	Rentería 67'; Miranda (yellow card) 75'	Report	Montero 7', (yellow card) 34'; Carrasco (yellow card) 38'; González (yellow card) 53'; Levesque (yellow card) 90'	Stadium: Columbus Crew Stadium; Attendance: 7,148; Referee: Mark Kadlecik; Assistant referees: Steve Taylor; James Conlee; Fourth official: Mark Geiger

May 14 9	San Jose Earthquakes	3–0	Columbus Crew	Santa Clara, CA
10:30 PM EDT	Ring (yellow card) 24'; Wondolowski 50'; McDonald 59', (red card) 74'; Stephenson 62'; Hernandez (yellow card) 70'; Johnson (yellow card) 75'	Report	Heinemann (yellow card) 67'	Stadium: Buck Shaw Stadium; Attendance: 9,142; Referee: Jorge Gonzalez; Assistant referees: Greg Barkey; Jeff Hosking; Fourth official: Allen Chapman

May 21 10	Portland Timbers	1–0	Columbus Crew	Portland, OR
10:30 PM EDT	Cooper (yellow card) 37'; Brunner 46'; Chara (yellow card) 84'	Report	Marshall (yellow card) 23'; James (yellow card) 82'	Stadium: Jeld-Wen Field; Attendance: 18,627; Referee: Edvin Jurisevic; Assistant referees: Colin Arblaster; James Conlee; Fourth official: Tyler Ploeger

May 28 11	Columbus Crew	3–3	Chivas USA	Columbus, OH
7:30 PM EDT	Mendoza 17', 52'; Ekpo 64'	Report	LaBrocca 4'; Flores 57', (yellow card) 21' (yellow-red card) 69'; Boyens 37'; Pearce (yellow card) 46'	Stadium: Columbus Crew Stadium; Attendance: 9,431; Referee: Jasen Anno; Assistant referees: Corey Rockwell; Corey Parker; Fourth official: Chris Penso

June 4 12	New York Red Bulls	1–1	Columbus Crew	Harrison, NJ
7:30 PM EDT	Ballouchy 9'; da Luz (yellow card) 55'	Report	Balchan (yellow card) 32', (goal) 90+2'; Ekpo (yellow card) 72'	Stadium: Red Bull Arena; Attendance: 20,393; Referee: Niko Bratis; Assistant referees: Craig Lowry; Bill Dittmar; Fourth official: Jorge Gonzalez

June 8 13	Columbus Crew	2–1	Real Salt Lake	Columbus, OH
7:30 PM EDT	Mendoza 76' (pen.); Gardner 82'	Report	Olave 7'; Espindola (yellow card) 78'; Wingert (yellow card) 88'	Stadium: Columbus Crew Stadium; Attendance: 9,650; Referee: Ricardo Salazar; Assistant referees: Corey Rockwell; Frank Anderson; Fourth official: Fotis Bazakos

June 12 14	Columbus Crew	0–1	Chicago Fire	Columbus, OH
4:00 PM EDT	Ekpo (yellow card) 40'; Meran (yellow card) 50'	Report	Nyarko (yellow card) 54'; Nazarit 90'	Stadium: Columbus Crew Stadium; Attendance: 13,498; Referee: Hilario Grajeda; Assistant referees: Kermit Quisenberry; Bill Dittmar; Fourth official: Sorin Stoica

June 18 15	Houston Dynamo	0–2	Columbus Crew	Houston, TX
8:30 PM EDT	Freeman (yellow card) 43'; Palmer (yellow card) 46' (yellow-red card) 52'	Report	Mendoza 44'; Añor (yellow card) 49', (goal) 71'; Heinemann (yellow card) 83'	Stadium: Robertson Stadium; Attendance: 13,039; Referee: Jasen Anno; Assistant referees: Fabio Tovar; Ian Anderson; Fourth official: Juan Guzman

June 26 16	Columbus Crew	4–1	Colorado Rapids	Columbus, OH
8:00 PM EDT	Gaven 12'; Mendoza 18', 48'; Heinemann (yellow card) 38' (goal) 57'	Report	Casey 5', (red card) 29'; Moor (yellow card) 52'	Stadium: Columbus Crew Stadium; Attendance: 10,771; Referee: Andrew Chapin; Assistant referees: Greg Barkey; Matthew Kreitzer; Fourth official: Hilario Grajeda

July 2 17	FC Dallas	0–2	Columbus Crew	Frisco, TX
9:00 PM EDT	Jackson (yellow card) 24', (goal) 76'; Ihemelu (yellow card) 29'; Shea 58'	Report	Hesmer (yellow card) 7'; Ekpo (yellow card) 20'; Iro (yellow card) 57' (yellow-red card) 82'	Stadium: Pizza Hut Park; Attendance: 20,704; Referee: Jorge Gonzalez; Assistant referees: Bill Dittmar; Paul Scott; Fourth official: Mark DeClouet

July 6 18	Vancouver Whitecaps FC	0-1	Columbus Crew	Vancouver, BC
10:00 PM EDT	Koffie (yellow card) 7'; Camilo (yellow card) 23'; Salinas (red card) 77'	Report	Gehrig (yellow card) 74'; Marshall (yellow card) 84'; Cunningham 90'	Stadium: Empire Field; Attendance: 19,079; Referee: Chris Penso; Assistant referees: Darren Clark; Mike Rottersman; Fourth official: Ricardo Salazar

July 16 19	Columbus Crew	0–0	San Jose Earthquakes	Columbus, OH
7:30 PM EDT	Lenhart (yellow card) 16'; Ring (yellow card) 69'	Report		Stadium: Columbus Crew Stadium; Attendance: 14,109; Referee: Jair Marrufo; Assistant referees: C.J. Morgante; Corey Rockwell; Fourth official: Fotis Bazakos

July 20 20	Los Angeles Galaxy	1–0	Columbus Crew	Carson, CA
10:30 PM EDT	Berhalter (yellow card) 16'; Franklin 70'; Juninho (yellow card) 85'; Beckham (yellow card) 90+2'	Report	James (yellow card) 65'	Stadium: Home Depot Center; Attendance: 24,709; Referee: Andrew Chapin; Assistant referees: Greg Barkey; Matthew Kreitzer; Fourth official: Alejandro Mariscal

July 23 21	Columbus Crew	1–0	Portland Timbers	Columbus, OH
8:00 PM EDT	Danso 79' (o.g.)	Report	Marcelin (yellow card) 78'	Stadium: Columbus Crew Stadium; Attendance: 11,246; Referee: Andrew Chapin; Assistant referees: Chris Strickland; Adam Garner; Fourth official: Allen Chapman

July 30 22	Real Salt Lake	0–2	Columbus Crew	Sandy, UT
9:00 PM EDT		Report	Gaven 5'; Heinemann 10'	Stadium: Rio Tinto Stadium; Attendance: 18,516; Referee: Jason Anno; Assistant referees: Frank Anderson; Corey Rockwell; Fourth official: Fotis Bazakos

August 5 23	Colorado Rapids	2–0	Columbus Crew	Commerce City, CO
9:30 PM EDT	Mullan 55'; Cummings 79'	Report	Rusmir (yellow card) 52'	Stadium: Dick's Sporting Goods Park; Attendance: 14,503; Referee: Alex Prus; Assistant referees: Greg Barkey; Jeff Hosking; Fourth official: José Carlos Rivero

August 13 24	Columbus Crew	3–1	New England Revolution	Columbus, OH
7:30 PM EDT	Alston 54' (o.g.); Miranda (yellow card) 60'; Meran (yellow card) 61'; James 75'; Rentería 81'; Añor (yellow card) 90'	Report	Feilhaber 45'	Stadium: Columbus Crew Stadium; Attendance: 13,041; Referee: Andrew Chapin; Assistant referees: Greg Barkey; Jeff Hosking; Fourth official: John McCloskey

August 20 25	Columbus Crew	2–1	Philadelphia Union	Columbus, OH
7:30 PM EDT	Rentería 37'; Hesmer (yellow card) 42'; Mendoza 51'; James (yellow card) 58'; Heinemann (yellow card) 84'	Report	Paunovic 42'; Farfan (yellow card) 90+2'; Valdes (yellow card) 90+3'	Stadium: Columbus Crew Stadium; Attendance: 13,869; Referee: Mark Kadlecik; Assistant referees: Chris Strickland; Peter Balciunas; Fourth official: Allen Chapman

August 27 26	Seattle Sounders FC	6–2	Columbus Crew	Seattle, WA
4:00 PM EDT	Neagle 4', 21', 70'; Rosales 16'; Fucito 40'; Parke (yellow card) 73'; Gardner 74' (o.g.); Scott (yellow card) 81'	Report	Cunningham 59'; Burns (yellow card) 65'; Gardner 73'	Stadium: CenturyLink Field; Attendance: 36,364; Referee: Baldomero Toledo; Assistant referees: Frank Anderson; Ian Anderson; Fourth official: Alejandro Mariscal

September 10 27	Columbus Crew	2–4	Toronto FC	Columbus, OH
7:30 PM EDT	Heinemann 67'; Miranda (yellow card) 73'; Mendoza 87'	Report	Soolsma 21'; Harden (yellow card) 37'; Johnson 42'; Avila (yellow card) 82'; de Guzman 83'; Koevermans 90+2'	Stadium: Columbus Crew Stadium; Attendance: 13,058; Referee: Jair Marrufo; Assistant referees: C.J. Morgante; Frank Anderson; Fourth official: Jasen Anno

September 14 28	Columbus Crew	2–2	Houston Dynamo	Columbus, OH
7:30 PM EDT	Ekpo (red card) 11'; Mendoza 64', 76'; Rogers (yellow card) 67'	Report	Watson 34'; Taylor (yellow card) 55'; Carr 86'	Stadium: Columbus Crew Stadium; Attendance: 10,709; Referee: Chris Penso; Assistant referees: Steve Taylor; Mike Rottersman; Fourth official: Hilario Grajeda

September 17 29	Philadelphia Union	1–0	Columbus Crew	Chester, PA
7:30 PM EDT	Le Toux 32'	Report	Rusmir (yellow card) 12'	Stadium: PPL Park; Attendance: 18,906; Referee: Alex Prus; Assistant referees: Chris Strickland; Adam Garner; Fourth official: Edvin Jurisevic

September 24 30	Columbus Crew	0–1	Los Angeles Galaxy	Columbus, OH
7:30 PM EDT	Ekpo (yellow card) 32'; James (yellow card) 57'; Rogers (yellow card) 83'	Report	Hejduk (yellow card) 90'; Barrett 90+3'	Stadium: Columbus Crew Stadium; Attendance: 21,203; Referee: Silviu Petrescu; Assistant referees: Daniel Belleau; Eric Proctor; Fourth official: Sorin Stoica

September 28 31	Sporting Kansas City	2–1	Columbus Crew	Kansas City, KS
8:30 PM EDT	Kamara 15'; Besler (yellow card) 42'; Collin (yellow card) 42'; James 74' (o.g.)	Report	Rentería 34'; Francis (yellow card) 36'	Stadium: Livestrong Sporting Park; Attendance: 17,838; Referee: Hilario Grajeda; Assistant referees: Bill Dittmar; Paul Scott; Fourth official: Chris Penso

October 2 32	Columbus Crew	2–1	D.C. United	Columbus, OH
4:00 PM EDT	Woolard 48' (o.g.); Gaven 60'; O'Rourke (yellow card) 66'	Report	Woolard 37'; Simms (yellow card) 40'; Burch (yellow card) 63'	Stadium: Columbus Crew Stadium; Attendance: 15,566; Referee: Baldomero Toledo; Assistant referees: Fabio Tovar; Ian Anderson; Fourth official: Juan Guzman

October 15 33	New England Revolution	0–3	Columbus Crew	Foxborough, MA
7:30 PM EDT	Joseph (yellow card) 90'	Report	Mendoza 31', (yellow card) 41', (goal) 63'; Ekpo (yellow card) 57'; Duka 59'	Stadium: Gillette Stadium; Attendance: 16,285; Referee: Mark Geiger; Assistant referees: Anthony Vasoli; Chris Strickland; Fourth official: Abbey Okulaja

October 22 34	Chicago Fire	3–2	Columbus Crew	Bridgeview, IL
8:30 PM EDT	Anibaba 11', 30'; Chaves 80'	Report	Miranda (yellow card) 45+1'; Rentería 73'; Duka (yellow card) 74', (goal) 79'; Ekpo (yellow card) 78' (yellow-red card) 90'	Stadium: Toyota Park; Attendance: 20,237; Referee: Hilario Grajeda; Assistant referees: Kermit Quisenberry; Claudiu Badea; Fourth official: Abbey Okulaja

=== MLS Cup Playoffs ===
==== Wildcard Match ====
October 27 Wildcard Match	Colorado Rapids	1–0	Columbus Crew	Commerce City, CO
10:00 EDT	Cummings 45+1'	Report	Miranda (yellow card) 15'	Stadium: Dick's Sporting Goods Park; Attendance: 7,803; Referee: Jorge Gonzalez; Assistant referees: Greg Barkey; Kermit Quisenberry; Fourth official: Andrew Chapin

=== CONCACAF Champions League ===
==== Quarterfinals ====
February 22 Leg 1	Columbus Crew (United States)	0–0	(United States) Real Salt Lake	Columbus, OH
20:00 EDT	Miranda (yellow card) 49'; Rentería (red card) 72'	Report	Beltran (yellow card) 42' (yellow-red card) 53'; Beckerman (yellow card) 54'; Borchers (red card) 72'	Stadium: Columbus Crew Stadium; Attendance: 4,665; Referee: Jair Marrufo (United States); Assistant referees: C.J. Morgante (United States); Eric Boria (United States); Fourth official: Ricardo Salazar (United States)

March 1 Leg 2	Real Salt Lake (United States)	4–1 (4–1 agg.)	(United States) Columbus Crew	Sandy, UT
22:00 EDT	Saborío 23'; Morales 36', (yellow card) 57', (goal) 77'; Williams 90+5'	Report	Gardner (yellow card) 43'; Mendoza 49'; Miranda (yellow card) 90+4'	Stadium: Rio Tinto Stadium; Attendance: 15,405; Referee: Mark Geiger (United States); Assistant referees: Corey Rockwell (United States); George Gansner (United States); Fourth official: Terry Vaughn (United States)

=== U.S. Open Cup ===
With a fifth-place overall finish last season, the Crew secured direct qualification into the third-round proper of the U.S. Open Cup.

June 28 Third Round	Columbus Crew (MLS) (Ohio)	1–2	(Virginia) Richmond Kickers (USLP)	Columbus, OH
7:30 PM EDT	Grossman 35'; O'Rourke (red card) 67'	Report	Hiroyama 22'; Hertel (yellow card) 35'; Bulow (yellow card) 88'; Delicâte 85'	Stadium: Columbus Crew Stadium; Attendance: 1,845; Referee: Sorin Stoica; Assistant referees: John Safar; Britton Maier; Fourth official: Pierre Saintil Francillon

== Reserve League ==
=== Eastern ===
Pos	Club	Pld	W	L	T	GF	GA	GD	Pts
1	Columbus Crew Reserves (C)	10	9	1	0	29	10	+19	27
2	D.C. United Reserves	10	5	1	4	21	14	+7	19
3	New England Revolution Reserves	10	4	5	1	14	22	−8	13
4	New York Red Bulls Reserves	9	2	5	2	10	20	−10	9
5	Toronto FC Reserves	9	2	5	2	15	15	0	8
6	Philadelphia Union Reserves	10	2	7	1	9	17	−8	7

=== Match results ===
March 20 1	D.C. United	3-2	Columbus Crew	Washington, D.C.
11:00 AM EDT	Brasesco 3'; Brettschneider 39'; Bošković 49'	Report	Añor 8'; Grossman 63'; Fred (yellow card) 72'	Stadium: D.C. United Training Complex

April 23 2	Toronto FC	1-2	Columbus Crew	Toronto, ON
6:45 PM EDT	Jackman 35'	Report	Mendoza 11', (red card) 43'; Davis 66', (yellow card) 89'; Meram (yellow card) 87'	Stadium: BMO Field

May 9 3	Columbus Crew	1-0	New England Revolution	Columbus, OH
10:00 AM EDT	Iro (yellow card) 56'; Meram 88'	Report	Taintor (yellow card) 84'	Stadium: Columbus Crew Stadium; Referee: Sorin Stoica; Assistant referees: Andrey Castel; Ryan Slack; Fourth official: Brandon Artis

May 30 4	New York Red Bulls	1-6	Columbus Crew	Montclair, NJ
11:00 AM EDT	Paullo 19'; Kassel (yellow card) 30'; Hot (yellow card) 46'	Report	Grossman 20'; Meram 26'; Añor 45'; Rusmir (yellow card) 45'; Jones 59'; Davis 82', 85'	Stadium: Montclair State University

August 21 5	Columbus Crew	1-0	Philadelphia Union	Columbus, OH
10:00 AM EDT	Catalano (yellow card) 31'; Añor 70'; Horton (yellow card) 81'	Report	Richter (yellow card) 34'	Stadium: Columbus Crew Stadium; Referee: Sorin Stoica; Assistant referees: Ryan Slack; Sal Saia; Fourth official: Ryan Lubbe

September 11 6	Columbus Crew	4-2	Toronto FC	Columbus, OH
10:00 AM EDT	Meram 21'; Burns 34'; Cunningham 37', 41'; Rusmir (yellow card) 51'	Report	Martina 32'; Viator (yellow card) 48'; Henry 85'	Stadium: Columbus Crew Stadium; Referee: Ben Trevino; Assistant referees: Cory Richardson; Brandon Rinkberger; Fourth official: Grant Brown

September 18 7	Philadelphia Union	1-2	Columbus Crew	Chester, PA
10:00 AM EDT	McInerney 14'; Tait (yellow card) 18'; Nakazawa (yellow card) 60'	Report	Ekpo 16', (yellow card) 63'; Gardner 75'	Stadium: PPL Park

October 10 8	Columbus Crew	3-0	New York Red Bulls	Columbus, OH
7:00 PM EDT	Meram 16'; Rusmir (yellow card) 35'; Grossman 42', (yellow card) 68'; Owoeri 85'	Report		Stadium: Columbus Crew Stadium; Referee: Sandip Basu; Assistant referees: Pierre Santil-Francillon; Tre Gaither; Fourth official: Cory Richardson
Note: Originally scheduled for March 26.

October 16 9	New England Revolution	1-5	Columbus Crew	Foxborough, MA
10:00 AM EDT	Sousa 26'; Mansally (yellow card) 27'	Report	Heinemann 45', (yellow card) 47', (goal) 51' (pen.), 71'; Burns 55' (pen.); Meram 79'	Stadium: Gillette Stadium; Referee: Randall Kelley; Assistant referees: Jason Pelletier; Doug Coutts; Fourth official: Kara Honthumb

November 15 10	Columbus Crew	3-1	D.C. United	Columbus, OH
7:00 PM EST	Chevez 48'; Rentería 72' (pen.), (yellow card) 85'; Añor 89'	Report	da Luz (red card) 25'; Ngwenya 30'; McTavish (yellow card) 57'	Stadium: Columbus Crew Stadium; Referee: Sorin Stoica; Assistant referees: Ryan Black; Andrew Casto; Fourth official: Grant Brown
Note: Originally scheduled for October 2.

== Statistics ==
=== Appearances and goals ===
Under "Apps" for each section, the first number represents the number of starts, and the second number represents appearances as a substitute.

No.	Pos	Nat	Player	Total		MLS		MLS Cup Playoffs		U.S. Open Cup		CONCACAF Champions League	
No.	Pos	Nat	Player	Apps	Goals	Apps	Goals	Apps	Goals	Apps	Goals	Apps	Goals
1	GK	(United States) USA	William Hesmer	33	0	32+0	0	1+0	0	0+0	0	0+0	0
2	DF	(United States) USA	Rich Balchan	22	1	18+1	1	1+0	0	0+0	0	2+0	0
3	DF	(United States) USA	Josh Williams	0	0	0+0	0	0+0	0	0+0	0	0+0	0
5	DF	(United States) USA	Danny O'Rourke	7	0	5+1	0	0+0	0	1+0	0	0+0	0
6	MF	(Cameroon) CMR	Tony Tchani	1	0	0+0	0	1+0	0	0+0	0	0+0	0
7	MF	(Venezuela) VEN	Bernardo Añor	14	1	6+7	1	0+0	0	0+1	0	0+0	0
9	FW	(Iraq) IRQ	Justin Meram	20	0	4+13	0	0+0	0	1+0	0	0+2	0
10	FW	(Peru) PER	Andrés Mendoza	32	13	25+4	13	1+0	0	0+0	0	2+0	0
11	MF	(United States) USA	Dilly Duka	24	2	16+6	2	1+0	0	0+0	0	0+1	0
12	MF	(United States) USA	Eddie Gaven	29	5	26+0	5	1+0	0	0+0	0	2+0	0
14	DF	(United States) USA	Chad Marshall	33	0	32+0	0	1+0	0	0+0	0	0+0	0
15	MF	(United States) USA	Kevin Burns	20	0	15+4	0	0+0	0	1+0	0	0+0	0
16	DF	(United States) USA	Eric Gehrig	9	0	4+4	0	0+0	0	1+0	0	0+0	0
17	MF	(Nigeria) NGR	Emmanuel Ekpo	34	1	29+3	1	0+0	0	0+0	0	2+0	0
18	MF	(United States) USA	Robbie Rogers	31	2	24+3	2	1+0	0	1+0	0	2+0	0
19	MF	(United States) USA	Cole Grossman	5	1	0+2	0	0+0	0	1+0	1	2+0	0
20	FW	(Venezuela) VEN	Emilio Rentería	20	8	14+4	8	0+1	0	0+0	0	1+0	0
21	DF	(Chile) CHI	Sebastián Miranda	37	0	34+0	0	1+0	0	0+0	0	2+0	0
22	MF	(Serbia) SRB	Dejan Rusmir	19	0	13+5	0	0+0	0	1+0	0	0+0	0
23	DF	(United States) USA	Korey Veeder	1	0	0+0	0	0+0	0	1+0	0	0+0	0
24	DF	(United States) USA	Ben Sippola	0	0	0+0	0	0+0	0	0+0	0	0+0	0
25	GK	(United States) USA	Alex Riggs	0	0	0+0	0	0+0	0	0+0	0	0+0	0
26	DF	(Trinidad and Tobago) TTO	Julius James	33	1	31+0	1	1+0	0	0+0	0	0+1	0
27	FW	(United States) USA	Aaron Horton	1	0	0+1	0	0+0	0	0+0	0	0+0	0
28	MF	(Argentina) ARG	Santiago Prim	1	0	0+0	0	0+0	0	1+0	0	0+0	0
29	DF	(Jamaica) JAM	Shaun Francis	6	0	5+1	0	0+0	0	0+0	0	0+0	0
30	GK	(United States) USA	Andy Gruenebaum	3	0	2+0	0	0+0	0	1+0	0	0+0	0
31	MF	(United States) USA	Josh Gardner	25	2	21+1	2	1+0	0	0+0	0	2+0	0
32	FW	(United States) USA	Tom Heinemann	30	3	12+16	3	0+1	0	0+1	0	0+0	0
33	FW	(United States) USA	Jeff Cunningham	25	2	4+17	2	0+1	0	1+0	0	1+1	0
			Own goal	0	3	-	3	-	0	-	0	-	0
Players who left Columbus during the season:
4	DF	(England) ENG	Andy Iro	7	0	2+2	0	0+0	0	0+1	0	2+0	0
6	MF	(United States) USA	Andy Adlard	0	0	0+0	0	0+0	0	0+0	0	0+0	0
13	MF	(France) FRA	Leandre Griffit	2	0	0+1	0	0+0	0	0+0	0	0+1	0
27	DF	(Switzerland) SUI	Kwaku Nyamekye	0	0	0+0	0	0+0	0	0+0	0	0+0	0
34	GK	(United States) USA	Ray Burse	2	0	0+0	0	0+0	0	0+0	0	2+0	0
34	GK	(United States) USA	Chris Konopka	2	0	0+0	0	0+0	0	0+0	0	2+0	0

=== Disciplinary record ===
No.	Pos.	Name	MLS		MLS Playoffs		U.S. Open Cup		CONCACAF Champions League		Total	
No.	Pos.	Name	Yellow card	Red card	Yellow card	Red card	Yellow card	Red card	Yellow card	Red card	Yellow card	Red card
1	GK	(United States) William Hesmer	2	0	0	0	0	0	0	0	2	0
2	DF	(United States) Rich Balchan	1	0	0	0	0	0	0	0	1	0
3	DF	(United States) Josh Williams	0	0	0	0	0	0	0	0	0	0
5	DF	(United States) Danny O'Rourke	1	0	0	0	0	1	0	0	1	1
6	MF	(Cameroon) Tony Tchani	0	0	0	0	0	0	0	0	0	0
7	MF	(Venezuela) Bernardo Añor	2	0	0	0	0	0	0	0	2	0
9	FW	(Iraq) Justin Meram	2	0	0	0	0	0	0	0	2	0
10	FW	(Peru) Andrés Mendoza	1	0	0	0	0	0	0	0	1	0
11	MF	(United States) Dilly Duka	2	0	0	0	0	0	0	0	2	0
12	MF	(United States) Eddie Gaven	0	0	0	0	0	0	0	0	0	0
14	DF	(United States) Chad Marshall	2	0	0	0	0	0	0	0	2	0
15	MF	(United States) Kevin Burns	4	0	0	0	0	0	0	0	4	0
16	DF	(United States) Eric Gehrig	1	0	0	0	0	0	0	0	1	0
17	MF	(Nigeria) Emmanuel Ekpo	8	2	0	0	0	0	0	0	8	2
18	MF	(United States) Robbie Rogers	2	0	0	0	0	0	0	0	2	0
19	MF	(United States) Cole Grossman	0	0	0	0	0	0	0	0	0	0
20	FW	(Venezuela) Emilio Rentería	0	0	0	0	0	0	0	1	0	1
21	DF	(Chile) Sebastián Miranda	5	0	1	0	0	0	2	0	8	0
22	MF	(Serbia) Dejan Rusmir	4	0	0	0	0	0	0	0	4	0
23	DF	(United States) Korey Veeder	0	0	0	0	0	0	0	0	0	0
24	DF	(United States) Ben Sippola	0	0	0	0	0	0	0	0	0	0
25	GK	(United States) Alex Riggs	0	0	0	0	0	0	0	0	0	0
26	DF	(Trinidad and Tobago) Julius James	7	0	0	0	0	0	0	0	7	0
27	FW	(United States) Aaron Horton	0	0	0	0	0	0	0	0	0	0
28	MF	(Argentina) Santiago Prim	0	0	0	0	0	0	0	0	0	0
29	DF	(Jamaica) Shaun Francis	1	0	0	0	0	0	0	0	1	0
30	GK	(United States) Andy Gruenebaum	0	0	0	0	0	0	0	0	0	0
31	MF	(United States) Josh Gardner	0	0	0	0	0	0	1	0	1	0
32	FW	(United States) Tom Heinemann	4	0	0	0	0	0	0	0	4	0
33	FW	(United States) Jeff Cunningham	0	0	0	0	0	0	0	0	0	0
Players who left Columbus during the season:
4	DF	(England) Andy Iro	1	1	0	0	0	0	0	0	1	1
6	MF	(United States) Andy Adlard	0	0	0	0	0	0	0	0	0	0
13	MF	(France) Léandre Griffit	0	0	0	0	0	0	0	0	0	0
27	DF	(Switzerland) Kwaku Nyamekye	0	0	0	0	0	0	0	0	0	0
34	GK	(United States) Ray Burse	0	0	0	0	0	0	0	0	0	0
34	GK	(United States) Chris Konopka	0	0	0	0	0	0	0	0	0	0

=== Clean sheets ===
No.	Name	MLS	MLS Playoffs	U.S. Open Cup	CONCACAF Champions League	Total	Games Played		
No.	Name	1	(United States) William Hesmer	8	0	0	0	8	33
25	(United States) Alex Riggs	0	0	0	0	0	0		
30	(United States) Andy Gruenebaum	2	0	0	0	2	3		
Players who left Columbus during the season:
25	(United States) Ray Burse	0	0	0	1	1	2		
34	(United States) Chris Konopka	0	0	0	0	0	0		

== Reserve League Statistics ==
=== Appearances and goals ===
Under "Apps" for each section, the first number represents the number of starts, and the second number represents appearances as a substitute.

No.	Pos	Nat	Player	Total		MLS Reserve League	
No.	Pos	Nat	Player	Apps	Goals	Apps	Goals
6	MF	(United States) USA	Andy Adlard	4	0	1+3	0
7	MF	(Venezuela) VEN	Bernardo Añor	7	4	6+1	4
-	MF	(United States) USA	Dominic Aracri	2	0	0+2	0
-	FW	(Colombia) COL	Jhonny Arteaga	2	0	2+0	0
-	MF	(United States) USA	Javier Alvial	0	0	0+0	0
-	FW	(United States) USA	JJ Bain	1	0	0+1	0
2	DF	(United States) USA	Rich Balchan	2	0	2+0	0
15	MF	(United States) USA	Kevin Burns	6	2	5+1	2
-	MF	(United States) USA	Tom Catalano	1	0	1+0	0
-	MF	(United States) USA	Khai Celestin	1	0	0+1	0
-	MF	(Costa Rica) CRC	Walter Chevez	1	1	0+1	1
33	FW	(United States) USA	Jeff Cunningham	4	2	4+0	2
-	MF	(United States) USA	Chris Davis	2	3	0+2	3
-	FW	(United States) USA	George Davis	2	0	0+2	0
17	MF	(Nigeria) NGR	Emmanuel Ekpo	2	1	2+0	1
29	DF	(Jamaica) JAM	Shaun Francis	5	0	5+0	0
31	MF	(United States) USA	Josh Gardner	4	1	4+0	1
16	DF	(United States) USA	Eric Gehrig	9	0	8+1	0
-	DF	(United States) USA	Greg Gehrig	2	0	0+2	0
-	DF	(Costa Rica) CRC	Esteban Granados	1	0	0+1	0
13	MF	(France) FRA	Leandre Griffit	3	0	3+0	0
19	MF	(United States) USA	Cole Grossman	8	3	7+1	3
30	GK	(United States) USA	Andy Gruenebaum	8	0	8+0	0
-	GK	(United States) USA	Chase Harrison	0	0	0+0	0
32	FW	(United States) USA	Tom Heinemann	4	3	4+0	3
27	FW	(United States) USA	Aaron Horton	6	0	2+4	0
4	DF	(England) ENG	Andy Iro	3	0	3+0	0
-	DF	(United States) USA	Mike Jones	1	1	1+0	1
34	GK	(United States) USA	Chris Konopka	1	0	1+0	0
10	FW	(Peru) PER	Andrés Mendoza	1	1	1+0	1
9	FW	(Iraq) IRQ	Justin Meram	9	5	8+1	5
5	DF	(United States) USA	Danny O'Rourke	2	0	2+0	0
-	FW	(Nigeria) NGR	John Owoeri	2	1	0+2	1
28	MF	(Argentina) ARG	Santiago Prim	7	0	3+4	0
20	FW	(Venezuela) VEN	Emilio Rentería	1	1	1+0	1
25	GK	(United States) USA	Alex Riggs	4	0	1+3	0
18	MF	(United States) USA	Robbie Rogers	1	0	1+0	0
-	FW	(Mexico) MEX	Arnhold Rivas	1	0	0+1	0
22	MF	(Serbia) SRB	Dejan Rusmir	5	0	5+0	0
24	DF	(United States) USA	Ben Sippola	8	0	3+5	0
-	GK	(United States) USA	Alex Stout	0	0	0+0	0
6	MF	(Cameroon) CMR	Tony Tchani	1	0	1+0	0
-	MF	(Nigeria) NGR	Julius Ubido	1	0	1+0	0
23	DF	(United States) USA	Korey Veeder	9	0	8+1	0
3	DF	(United States) USA	Josh Williams	7	0	7+0	0
			Own goal	0	0	-	0

=== Disciplinary record ===
No.	Pos.	Name	MLS Reserve League		Total	
No.	Pos.	Name	Yellow card	Red card	Yellow card	Red card
6	MF	(United States) Andy Adlard	0	0	0	0
7	MF	(Venezuela) Bernardo Añor	0	0	0	0
-	MF	(United States) Dominic Aracri	0	0	0	0
-	FW	(Colombia) Jhonny Arteaga	0	0	0	0
-	MF	(United States) Javier Alvial	0	0	0	0
-	FW	(United States) JJ Bain	0	0	0	0
2	DF	(United States) Rich Balchan	0	0	0	0
15	MF	(United States) Kevin Burns	0	0	0	0
-	MF	(United States) Tom Catalano	1	0	1	0
-	MF	(United States) Khai Celestin	0	0	0	0
-	MF	(Costa Rica) Walter Chevez	0	0	0	0
33	FW	(United States) Jeff Cunningham	0	0	0	0
-	MF	(United States) Chris Davis	1	0	1	0
-	FW	(United States) George Davis	0	0	0	0
17	MF	(Nigeria) Emmanuel Ekpo	1	0	1	0
29	DF	(Jamaica) Shaun Francis	0	0	0	0
31	MF	(United States) Josh Gardner	0	0	0	0
16	DF	(United States) Eric Gehrig	0	0	0	0
-	DF	(United States) Greg Gehrig	0	0	0	0
-	DF	(Costa Rica) Esteban Granados	0	0	0	0
13	MF	(France) Léandre Griffit	0	0	0	0
19	MF	(United States) Cole Grossman	1	0	1	0
30	GK	(United States) Andy Gruenebaum	0	0	0	0
-	GK	(United States) Chase Harrison	0	0	0	0
32	FW	(United States) Tom Heinemann	1	0	1	0
27	FW	(United States) Aaron Horton	1	0	1	0
4	DF	(England) Andy Iro	1	0	1	0
-	DF	(United States) Mike Jones	0	0	0	0
34	GK	(United States) Chris Konopka	0	0	0	0
10	FW	(Peru) Andrés Mendoza	0	1	0	1
9	FW	(Iraq) Justin Meram	1	0	1	0
5	DF	(United States) Danny O'Rourke	0	0	0	0
-	FW	(Nigeria) John Owoeri	0	0	0	0
28	MF	(Argentina) Santiago Prim	0	0	0	0
20	FW	(Venezuela) Emilio Rentería	1	0	1	0
25	GK	(United States) Alex Riggs	0	0	0	0
18	MF	(United States) Robbie Rogers	0	0	0	0
-	FW	(Mexico) Arnhold Rivas	0	0	0	0
22	MF	(Serbia) Dejan Rusmir	3	0	3	0
24	DF	(United States) Ben Sippola	0	0	0	0
-	GK	(United States) Alex Stout	0	0	0	0
6	MF	(Cameroon) Tony Tchani	0	0	0	0
-	MF	(Nigeria) Julius Ubido	0	0	0	0
23	DF	(United States) Korey Veeder	0	0	0	0
3	DF	(United States) Josh Williams	0	0	0	0

=== Clean sheets ===
No.	Name	MLS Reserve League	Total	Games Played		
No.	Name	30	(United States) Andy Gruenebaum	3	3	8
-	(United States) Chase Harrison	0	0	0		
34	(United States) Chris Konopka	0	0	1		
25	(United States) Alex Riggs	0	0	4		
-	(United States) Alex Stout	0	0	0		

== Transfers ==
=== In ===
Pos.	Player	Transferred from	Fee/notes	Date	Source
FW	(United States) Tom Heinemann	(United States) Charleston Battery	Signed via discovery	January 6, 2011	
DF	(Switzerland) Kwaku Nyamekye	(United States) Harvard Crimson	Drafted in round 4 of the 2010 MLS SuperDraft	January 24, 2011	
FW	(United States) Jeff Cunningham	(United States) FC Dallas	Selected in Stage 2 of the 2010 MLS Re-Entry Draft	January 28, 2011	
DF	(United States) Korey Veeder	(United States) Crystal Palace Baltimore	Allocated via weighted lottery	February 15, 2011	
DF	(United States) Rich Balchan	(United States) Indiana Hoosiers	Drafted in round 1 of the 2011 MLS SuperDraft	February 17, 2011	
FW	(Iraq) Justin Meram	(United States) Michigan Wolverines	Drafted in round 1 of the 2011 MLS SuperDraft	February 17, 2011	
MF	(United States) Cole Grossman	(United States) Duke Blue Devils	Drafted in round 2 of the 2011 MLS SuperDraft	February 17, 2011	
MF	(Venezuela) Bernardo Añor	(United States) South Florida Bulls	Drafted in round 3 of the 2011 MLS SuperDraft	February 17, 2011	
DF	(United States) Ben Sippola	(United States) Butler Bulldogs	Drafted in round 2 of the 2011 MLS Supplemental Draft	February 21, 2011	
DF	(United States) Andy Adlard	(United States) Indiana Hoosiers	Drafted in round 3 of the 2011 MLS Supplemental Draft	February 21, 2011	
MF	(United States) Josh Gardner	(United States) Carolina RailHawks FC	Signed via discovery	February 21, 2011	
GK	(United States) Alex Riggs	(United States) Missouri State Bears	Signed via discovery	February 22, 2011	
DF	(Trinidad and Tobago) Julius James	(United States) D.C. United	Signed via discovery	February 28, 2011	
MF	(Serbia) Dejan Rusmir	(Romania) FCV Farul Constanța	Signed via discovery	March 9, 2011	
DF	(United States) Eric Gehrig	(United States) Chicago Fire Premier	Signed via discovery	February 21, 2011	
MF	(Argentina) Santiago Prim	(Argentina) San Lorenzo de Almagro	Signed via discovery	April 26, 2011	
FW	(United States) Aaron Horton	(United States) Louisville Cardinals	Signed to a homegrown contract	May 17, 2011	
MF	(Cameroon) Tony Tchani	(Canada) Toronto FC	Traded for Andy Iro and Léandre Griffit	July 15, 2011	
DF	(United States) Carlos Mendes	(United States) New York Red Bulls	Selected in Stage 1 of the 2011 MLS Re-Entry Draft	December 5, 2011	
GK	(United States) Matt Lampson	(United States) Ohio State Buckeyes	Signed to a homegrown contract	December 15, 2011	

=== Loans in ===
Pos.	Player	Parent club	Length/Notes	Beginning	End	Source
GK	(United States) Ray Burse	(United States) MLS Pool	Short term agreement	February 22, 2011	March 15, 2011	
GK	(United States) Chris Konopka	(United States) MLS Pool	Short term agreements	July 26, 2011; September 11, 2011	July 31, 2011; September 15, 2011	

=== Out ===
Pos.	Player	Transferred to	Fee/notes	Date	Source
FW	(United States) Steven Lenhart	(United States) San Jose Earthquakes	Traded for a 1st round draft pick in the 2011 MLS SuperDraft and allocation money	January 13, 2011	
DF	(Switzerland) Kwaku Nyamekye	Retired	Placed on waivers	February 28, 2011	
MF	(United States) Andy Adlard	Retired	Placed on waivers	June 30, 2011	
DF	(England) Andy Iro	(Canada) Toronto FC	Traded with Léandre Griffit for Tony Tchani	July 15, 2011	
MF	(France) Léandre Griffit	(Canada) Toronto FC	Traded with Andy Iro for Tony Tchani	July 15, 2011	
MF	(United States) Josh Gardner	(Canada) Montreal Impact	Selected in round 7 of the 2011 MLS Expansion Draft	November 23, 2011	
MF	(Argentina) Santiago Prim	(Uruguay) Rampla Juniors	Placed on waivers	November 23, 2011	
MF	(Serbia) Dejan Rusmir	(Greece) Olympiakos Nicosia	Placed on waivers	November 23, 2011	
MF	(United States) Kevin Burns	(United States) Carolina RailHawks	Option declined	November 29, 2011	
FW	(United States) Jeff Cunningham	(Guatemala) Comunicaciones F.C.	Option declined	November 29, 2011	
FW	(Peru) Andrés Mendoza	(Mexico) Atlante F.C.	Option declined	November 29, 2011	
GK	(United States) Alex Riggs	(United States) St. Louis FC	Option declined	November 29, 2011	
DF	(United States) Ben Sippola	(Sweden) Torslanda IK	Option declined	November 29, 2011	
MF	(United States) Robbie Rogers	(England) Leeds United F.C.	Contract expired	December 31, 2011	
DF	(Nigeria) Emmanuel Ekpo	(Norway) Molde FK	Contract expired	December 31, 2011	

=== MLS Draft picks ===
Draft picks are not automatically signed to the team roster. Only those who are signed to a contract will be listed as transfers in. The picks for the Columbus Crew are listed below:

2011 Columbus Crew SuperDraft Picks
Round	Pick	Player	Position	College
1	12	(United States) Rich Balchan	DF	Indiana
1	15	(Iraq) Justin Meram	FW	Michigan
2	28	(United States) Cole Grossman	MF	Duke
3	48	(Venezuela) Bernardo Añor	MF	South Florida

2011 Columbus Crew Supplemental Draft Picks
Round	Pick	Player	Position	College
2	30	(United States) Ben Sippola	DF	Butler
3	48	(United States) Andy Adlard	MF	Indiana

2011 Columbus Crew Re-Entry Draft Picks
Stage	Round	Pick	Player	Position	Team
1	1	9	(United States) Carlos Mendes	DF	New York Red Bulls

== Awards ==
MLS Team of the Week
Week	Starters	Honorable Mentions	Opponent(s)	Link
2	(United States) Chad Marshall		(United States) New York Red Bulls	
3	(United States) Chad Marshall		(United States) FC Dallas	
4	(United States) Chad Marshall		(United States) Chivas USA	
5	(United States) Dilly Duka (Poland) Robert Warzycha		(United States) Sporting Kansas City	
7	(Venezuela) Emilio Rentería	(United States) Eddie Gaven (United States) William Hesmer	(Canada) Vancouver Whitecaps FC	
8		(United States) Chad Marshall	(United States) Seattle Sounders FC	
10	(United States) Tom Heinemann		(United States) Portland Timbers	
11	(Peru) Andrés Mendoza		(United States) Chivas USA	
12		(Iraq) Justin Meram (United States) Rich Balchan	(United States) New York Red Bulls	
13	(Trinidad and Tobago) Julius James		(United States) Real Salt Lake (United States) Chicago Fire	
14	(United States) William Hesmer (Venezuela) Bernardo Añor	(United States) Rich Balchan (Peru) Andrés Mendoza	(United States) Houston Dynamo	
15	(United States) Rich Balchan (Peru) Andrés Mendoza	(United States) Tom Heinemann	(United States) Colorado Rapids	
17		(United States) William Hesmer (United States) Robbie Rogers	(Canada) Vancouver Whitecaps FC	
18		(United States) William Hesmer (Trinidad and Tobago) Julius James	(United States) San Jose Earthquakes	
19	(United States) Chad Marshall		(United States) Los Angeles Galaxy	
20	(United States) Robbie Rogers	(Trinidad and Tobago) Julius James (United States) Chad Marshall	(United States) Real Salt Lake	
22	(Trinidad and Tobago) Julius James	(United States) Robbie Rogers (United States) Dilly Duka	(United States) New England Revolution	
23	(Trinidad and Tobago) Julius James	(United States) William Hesmer (United States) Chad Marshall (United States) Robbie Rogers	(United States) Philadelphia Union	
29	(United States) Eddie Gaven		(United States) Sporting Kansas City (United States) D.C. United	
31	(Peru) Andrés Mendoza	(United States) Dilly Duka (Trinidad and Tobago) Julius James	(United States) New England Revolution	
32	(United States) Dilly Duka	(Venezuela) Emilio Rentería	(United States) Chicago Fire	

=== MLS Player of the Week ===
Week	Player	Opponent	Link
14	(Venezuela) Bernardo Añor	Houston Dynamo	

=== MLS Save of the Week ===
Week	Player	Opponent	Link
20	(United States) Andy Gruenebaum	Chivas USA	

=== Crew Team Awards ===
- Circle of Honor – Brian McBride
- Most Valuable Player – Chad Marshall
- Defensive Player of the Year – Julius James
- Scoring Champion – Andrés Mendoza
- Man of the Year – Jeff Cunningham
- Coach's Award – Eddie Gaven
- Newcomer of the Year – Sebastián Miranda
- Goal of the Year – Jeff Cunningham
- Humanitarian of the Year – Tom Heinemann
- Hardest Working Man of the Year – Robbie Rogers
- Comeback Player of the Year – Danny O'Rourke
- Fan's Choice – Emilio Rentería
- Jim Nelson Fans of the Year – Randy Sims & Alice Potter
- Academy U15/U16 Player of the Year – Zach Mason
- Academy U17/U18 Player of the Year – Connor Klekota
- Academy U19/U20 Player of the Year – Matt Walker
