= List of Major League Soccer transfers 2011 =

The following is a list of transfers for the 2011 Major League Soccer season. The Portland Timbers made their first moves by signing Steve Cronin, Bright Dike, Eddie Johnson, and Ryan Pore. Another expansion side, Vancouver Whitecaps FC made their first signing on November 18, 2010, acquiring Jay DeMerit through the league's allocation process. On November 24, 2010, the Timbers and the Whitecaps selected 10 unprotected players in the 2010 MLS Expansion Draft. The rest of the moves will be made from the 2010-2011 off-season all the way through the 2011 season.

== Transfers ==
Date	Name	Moving from	Moving to	Mode of Transfer
July 19, 2010^{1}	(United States) Jonathan Bornstein	Chivas USA	(Mexico) Tigres	Free
October 19, 2010	(United States) Steve Cronin	Unattached	Portland Timbers	Free
October 19, 2010	(United States) Bright Dike	Unattached	Portland Timbers	Free
October 19, 2010	(England) Eddie Johnson	(United States) Austin Aztex	Portland Timbers	Free
October 19, 2010	(United States) Ryan Pore	Unattached	Portland Timbers	Free
November 18, 2010	(United States) Jay DeMerit	Unattached	Vancouver Whitecaps FC	Allocation
November 22, 2010	(France) Julien Baudet	Colorado Rapids	Seattle Sounders FC	Trade
November 22, 2010	(United States) Brian Carroll	Columbus Crew	Philadelphia Union	Trade
November 22, 2010	(Republic of Ireland) Danny Earls	Colorado Rapids	Seattle Sounders FC	Trade
November 22, 2010	(United States) Jeremy Hall	New York Red Bulls	Portland Timbers	Trade
November 22, 2010	(United States) Peter Vagenas	Seattle Sounders FC	Colorado Rapids	Trade
November 24, 2010	(El Salvador) Arturo Alvarez	San Jose Earthquakes	Portland Timbers	Expansion Draft
November 24, 2010	(El Salvador) Arturo Alvarez	Portland Timbers	Real Salt Lake	Trade
November 24, 2010^{2}	(United States) Jonathan Bornstein	Chivas USA	Portland Timbers	Expansion Draft
November 24, 2010	(United States) Eric Brunner	Columbus Crew	Portland Timbers	Expansion Draft
November 24, 2010	(United States) Joe Cannon	San Jose Earthquakes	Vancouver Whitecaps FC	Expansion Draft
November 24, 2010^{2}	(United States) Robbie Findley	Real Salt Lake	Portland Timbers	Expansion Draft
November 24, 2010	(United States) Alan Gordon	Chivas USA	Vancouver Whitecaps FC	Expansion Draft
November 24, 2010	(United States) Alan Gordon	Vancouver Whitecaps FC	Chivas USA	Trade
November 24, 2010	(United States) Jordan Graye	D.C. United	Portland Timbers	Expansion Draft
November 24, 2010	(Saint Kitts and Nevis) Atiba Harris	FC Dallas	Vancouver Whitecaps FC	Expansion Draft
November 24, 2010	(United States) David Horst	Real Salt Lake	Portland Timbers	Expansion Draft
November 24, 2010	(United States) Jonathan Leathers	Sporting Kansas City	Vancouver Whitecaps FC	Expansion Draft
November 24, 2010	(United States) Peter Lowry	Chicago Fire	Portland Timbers	Expansion Draft
November 24, 2010	(United States) Dax McCarty	FC Dallas	Portland Timbers	Expansion Draft
November 24, 2010	(United States) Dax McCarty	Portland Timbers	D.C. United	Trade
November 24, 2010	(Scotland) Adam Moffat	Columbus Crew	Portland Timbers	Expansion Draft
November 24, 2010	(Venezuela) Alejandro Moreno	Philadelphia Union	Vancouver Whitecaps FC	Expansion Draft
November 24, 2010	(Venezuela) Alejandro Moreno	Vancouver Whitecaps FC	Chivas USA	Trade
November 24, 2010	(The Gambia) Sanna Nyassi	Seattle Sounders FC	Vancouver Whitecaps FC	Expansion Draft
November 24, 2010	(The Gambia) Sanna Nyassi	Vancouver Whitecaps FC	Colorado Rapids	Trade
November 24, 2010	(United States) Shea Salinas	Philadelphia Union	Vancouver Whitecaps FC	Expansion Draft
November 24, 2010	(United States) Nathan Sturgis	Seattle Sounders FC	Vancouver Whitecaps FC	Expansion Draft
November 24, 2010	(United States) John Thorrington	Chicago Fire	Vancouver Whitecaps FC	Expansion Draft
November 24, 2010	(United States) Anthony Wallace	Colorado Rapids	Portland Timbers	Expansion Draft
November 24, 2010	(United States) Anthony Wallace	Portland Timbers	Colorado Rapids	Trade
November 24, 2010	(Costa Rica) Rodney Wallace	D.C. United	Portland Timbers	Trade
November 24, 2010	(Jamaica) O'Brian White	Toronto FC	Vancouver Whitecaps FC	Expansion Draft
November 24, 2010	(Jamaica) O'Brian White	Vancouver Whitecaps FC	Seattle Sounders FC	Trade
November 25, 2010	(United States) Nathan Sturgis	Vancouver Whitecaps FC	Toronto FC	Trade
November 26, 2010	(Canada) Philippe Davies	Unattached	Vancouver Whitecaps FC	Free
November 26, 2010	(United States) Wes Knight	Unattached	Vancouver Whitecaps FC	Free
November 26, 2010	(United States) Jay Nolly	Unattached	Vancouver Whitecaps FC	Free
November 30, 2010	(Cameroon) Joseph Nane	Toronto FC	Colorado Rapids	Trade
December 1, 2010	(Colombia) Fredy Montero	(Colombia) Deportivo Cali	Seattle Sounders FC	Undisclosed
December 1, 2010	(Costa Rica) Álvaro Saborío	(Switzerland) Sion	Real Salt Lake	Undisclosed
December 3, 2010	(United States) Jason Garey	Columbus Crew	Houston Dynamo	Trade
December 8, 2010^{2}	(United States) Aaron Hohlbein	Sporting Kansas City	Columbus Crew	Re-Entry Draft
December 8, 2010	(Zimbabwe) Joseph Ngwenya	Houston Dynamo	D.C. United	Re-Entry Draft
December 10, 2010	(Canada) Terry Dunfield	Unattached	Vancouver Whitecaps FC	Free
December 10, 2010	(United States) Greg Janicki	Unattached	Vancouver Whitecaps FC	Free
December 13, 2010	(Colombia) Wilman Conde, Jr.	Chicago Fire	(Mexico) Atlas	Undisclosed
December 13, 2010	(United States) Jordan Graye	Portland Timbers	Houston Dynamo	Trade
December 15, 2010	(Ghana) Khalif Alhassan	Unattached	Portland Timbers	Free
December 15, 2010	(Colombia) Juan Pablo Ángel	New York Red Bulls	Los Angeles Galaxy	Re-Entry Draft
December 15, 2010	(United States) Tristan Bowen	Los Angeles Galaxy	Chivas USA	Trade
December 15, 2010	(United States) Ryan Cochrane	Houston Dynamo	New England Revolution	Re-Entry Draft
December 15, 2010	(United States) Jimmy Conrad	Sporting Kansas City	Chivas USA	Re-Entry Draft
December 15, 2010	(United States) Jeff Cunningham	FC Dallas	Columbus Crew	Re-Entry Draft
December 15, 2010	(The Gambia) Mamadou Danso	Unattached	Portland Timbers	Free
December 15, 2010	(Brazil) Fred	Philadelphia Union	New England Revolution	Re-Entry Draft
December 15, 2010	(United States) Cory Gibbs	New England Revolution	Chicago Fire	Re-Entry Draft
December 15, 2010	(United States) Kevin Goldthwaite	Unattached	Portland Timbers	Free
December 15, 2010	(United States) Frankie Hejduk	Columbus Crew	Sporting Kansas City	Re-Entry Draft
December 15, 2010	(United States) Frankie Hejduk	Sporting Kansas City	Los Angeles Galaxy	Trade
December 15, 2010	(Haiti) James Marcelin	Unattached	Portland Timbers	Free
December 15, 2010	(Jamaica) Tyrone Marshall	Seattle Sounders FC	Colorado Rapids	Re-Entry Draft
December 15, 2010	(United States) Luke Sassano	New York Red Bulls	Los Angeles Galaxy	Re-Entry Draft
December 15, 2010	(United States) Luke Sassano	Los Angeles Galaxy	Sporting Kansas City	Trade
December 15, 2010	(United States) Chris Seitz	Philadelphia Union	Seattle Sounders FC	Re-Entry Draft
December 15, 2010	(United States) Chris Seitz	Seattle Sounders FC	FC Dallas	Trade
December 15, 2010	(United States) Josh Wolff	Sporting Kansas City	D.C. United	Re-Entry Draft
December 16, 2010	(Sweden) Erik Friberg	(Sweden) Häcken	Seattle Sounders FC	Free
December 17, 2010	(United States) Steve Cronin	Portland Timbers	D.C. United	Trade
December 17, 2010	(United States) Hunter Freeman	(Norway) Start	Houston Dynamo	Undisclosed
December 17, 2010	(United States) Troy Perkins	D.C. United	Portland Timbers	Trade
December 22, 2010	(Colombia) David Ferreira	(Brazil) Atlético Paranaense	FC Dallas	Undisclosed
December 23, 2010	(United States) Robbie Findley	Portland Timbers	(England) Nottingham Forest	Free
December 30, 2010	(Chile) Sebastián Miranda	(Chile) Unión Española	Columbus Crew	Free
January 6, 2011	(United States) Daniel Woolard	(United States) Carolina RailHawks	D.C. United	Free
January 7, 2011	(United States) Tom Heinemann	(United States) Carolina RailHawks	Columbus Crew	Free
January 10, 2011	(Uruguay) Rodrigo Brasesco	(Uruguay) Racing Club	D.C. United	Loan
January 10, 2011	(United States) Edson Buddle	Los Angeles Galaxy	(Germany) FC Ingolstadt 04	Free
January 11, 2011	(United States) Adam Cristman	D.C. United	Los Angeles Galaxy	Trade
January 11, 2011	(France) Didier Domi	(Greece) Olympiacos	New England Revolution	Free
January 11, 2011	(Croatia) Josip Mikulić	(Croatia) NK Zagreb	Chicago Fire	Free
January 11, 2011	(United States) Daniel Paladini	(United States) Carolina RailHawks	Chicago Fire	Free
January 12, 2011	(Brazil) Marcos Paullo	(Brazil) Atletico Paranaense	New York Red Bulls	Free
January 13, 2011	(United States) Chad Barrett	Toronto FC	Los Angeles Galaxy	Pre-Draft Trade
January 13, 2011	(United States) Jon Conway	Toronto FC	Chicago Fire	Pre-Draft Trade
January 13, 2011	(United States) Steven Lenhart	Columbus Crew	San Jose Earthquakes	Pre-Draft Trade
January 17, 2011	(United States) Kenny Cooper	(Germany) 1860 Munich	Portland Timbers	Allocation
January 20, 2011	(Colombia) Faryd Mondragón	(Germany) 1. FC Köln	Philadelphia Union	Free
January 20, 2011	(Colombia) Carlos Valdés	(Colombia) Santa Fe	Philadelphia Union	Undisclosed
January 21, 2011	(Switzerland) Alain Rochat	(Switzerland) Zürich	Vancouver Whitecaps FC	Undisclosed
January 24, 2011	(Switzerland) Kwaku Nyamekye	Unattached	Columbus Crew	Free
January 24, 2011	(Norway) Jan Gunnar Solli	(Norway) Brann	New York Red Bulls	Undisclosed
January 26, 2011	(United States) David Bingham	Unattached	San Jose Earthquakes	Lottery
January 26, 2011	(United States) Adin Brown	Unattached	Portland Timbers	Free
January 26, 2011	(El Salvador) Steve Purdy	Unattached	Portland Timbers	Free
January 28, 2011	(United States) Tony Donatelli	Unattached	San Jose Earthquakes	Free
January 28, 2011	(Argentina) Miguel López	(Argentina) Quilmes	Los Angeles Galaxy	Loan
January 28, 2011	(England) Luke Rodgers	(England) Notts County	New York Red Bulls	Undisclosed
February 1, 2011	(United States) Aaron Hohlbein	Columbus Crew	(United States) Fort Lauderdale Strikers	Free
February 3, 2011	(Uruguay) Gastón Puerari	(Uruguay) Montevideo Wanderers	Chicago Fire	Undisclosed
February 7, 2011	(Brazil) Ricardo Villar	(Germany) SpVgg Unterhaching	FC Dallas	Undisclosed
February 9, 2011	(New Zealand) Andrew Boyens	Unattached	Chivas USA	Free
February 9, 2011	(New Zealand) Simon Elliott	(New Zealand) Wellington Phoenix	Chivas USA	Free
February 10, 2011	(Tanzania) Nizar Khalfan	Unattached	Vancouver Whitecaps FC	Free
February 10, 2011	(Ghana) Gershon Koffie	Unattached	Vancouver Whitecaps FC	Free
February 11, 2011	(United States) Cody Arnoux	Unattached	Real Salt Lake	Lottery
February 11, 2011	(France) Ousmane Dabo	Unattached	New England Revolution	Free
February 14, 2011	(United States) Chris Agorsor	Unattached	Philadelphia Union	Lottery
February 15, 2011	(United States) Heath Pearce	FC Dallas	Chivas USA	Trade
February 15, 2011	(United States) Korey Veeder	(United States) Crystal Palace Baltimore	Columbus Crew	Lottery
February 16, 2011	(Netherlands) Elbekay Bouchiba	Unattached	Toronto FC	Free
February 16, 2011	(United States) Charlie Davies	(France) Sochaux	D.C. United	Loan
February 16, 2011	(Netherlands) Javier Martina	Unattached	Toronto FC	Free
February 16, 2011	(Netherlands) Nick Soolsma	Unattached	Toronto FC	Free
February 16, 2011	(Jamaica) Khari Stephenson	Unattached	San Jose Earthquakes	Free
February 16, 2011	(Jamaica) Jermaine Taylor	(Jamaica) St. George's SC	Houston Dynamo	Undisclosed
February 16, 2011	(United States) Sal Zizzo	Chivas USA	Portland Timbers	Trade
February 17, 2011	(Argentina) Franco Coria	(Argentina) Chacarita Juniors	New England Revolution	Undisclosed
February 17, 2011	(Canada) Pat Onstad	Unattached	D.C. United	Free
February 18, 2011	(Uruguay) Diego Cháves	(Uruguay) Nacional	Chicago Fire	Undisclosed
February 18, 2011	(Brazil) Fred	New England Revolution	D.C. United	Trade
February 18, 2011	(United States) Andrew Jacobson	Philadelphia Union	FC Dallas	Trade
February 21, 2011	(United States) Josh Gardner	(United States) Carolina RailHawks	Columbus Crew	Undisclosed
February 22, 2011	(United States) Ray Burse	Unattached	Columbus Crew	Free
February 22, 2011	(United States) Alex Riggs	Unattached	Columbus Crew	Free
February 22, 2011	(Guatemala) Carlos Ruiz	(Greece) Aris	Philadelphia Union	Free
February 28, 2011	(Trinidad and Tobago) Julius James	Unattached	Columbus Crew	Free
March 1, 2011	(United States) Jack Jewsbury	Sporting Kansas City	Portland Timbers	Trade
March 1, 2011	(United States) Scott Lorenz	Unattached	Sporting Kansas City	Free
March 1, 2011	(Argentina) Marcos Mondaini	(Uruguay) Fénix	Chivas USA	Loan
March 2, 2011	(Trinidad and Tobago) Thorne Holder	Unattached	Philadelphia Union	Free
March 2, 2011	(Croatia) Marko Marić	(Greece) Skoda Xanthi	Chicago Fire	Undisclosed
March 2, 2011	(United States) Lamar Neagle	Unattached	Seattle Sounders FC	Free
March 4, 2011	(Nigeria) Michael Augustine	(Nigeria) Abuja	New England Revolution	Undisclosed
March 5, 2011	(France) Eric Hassli	(Switzerland) Zürich	Vancouver Whitecaps FC	Undisclosed
March 7, 2011	(Colombia) Fabián Castillo	(Colombia) Deportivo Cali	FC Dallas	Undisclosed
March 7, 2011	(Colombia) Jorge Perlaza	(Colombia) Deportes Tolima	Portland Timbers	Undisclosed
March 8, 2011	(Switzerland) Davide Chiumiento	Unattached	Vancouver Whitecaps FC	Free
March 9, 2011	(Mexico) Sergio Arias	(Mexico) Guadalajara	Chivas USA	Loan
March 9, 2011	(Mexico) Francisco Mendoza	(Mexico) Guadalajara	Chivas USA	Loan
March 9, 2011	(Serbia) Dejan Rusmir	(Romania) Farul Constanţa	Columbus Crew	Undisclosed
March 10, 2011	(Israel) Orr Barouch	(Mexico) Tigres	Chicago Fire	Loan
March 10, 2011	(United States) Stephen Keel	Unattached	New York Red Bulls	Free
March 10, 2011	(Finland) Teemu Tainio	(Netherlands) Ajax	New York Red Bulls	Undisclosed
March 10, 2011	(United States) Michael Videira	Unattached	Chicago Fire	Free
March 11, 2011	(United States) Alan Gordon	Chivas USA	Toronto FC	Trade
March 11, 2011	(United States) Nick LaBrocca	Toronto FC	Chivas USA	Trade
March 11, 2011	(China) Long Tan	Unattached	Vancouver Whitecaps FC	Free
March 11, 2011	(United States) Blake Wagner	Unattached	Vancouver Whitecaps FC	Free
March 11, 2011	(Canada) Gianluca Zavarise	(Greece) Iraklis	Toronto FC	Undisclosed
March 14, 2011	(Brazil) Júlio César	Unattached	Sporting Kansas City	Free
March 16, 2011	(England) Simon Dawkins	(England) Tottenham Hotspur	San Jose Earthquakes	Loan
March 16, 2011	(Republic of Ireland) Caleb Folan	(England) Hull City	Colorado Rapids	Undisclosed
March 16, 2011	(United States) Ellis McLoughlin	Unattached	San Jose Earthquakes	Free
March 16, 2011	(Montenegro) Miloš Stojčev	(Serbia) Borac Čačak	Sporting Kansas City	Undisclosed
March 16, 2011	(Uganda) Brian Umony	(South Africa) University of Pretoria	Portland Timbers	Loan
March 17, 2011	(Brazil) Camilo	(South Korea) Gyeongnam	Vancouver Whitecaps FC	Undisclosed
March 17, 2011	(United States) Eric Gehrig	Unattached	Columbus Crew	Free
March 17, 2011	(United States) Rodrigo López	Unattached	Portland Timbers	Free
March 17, 2011	(Cameroon) Alexandre Morfaw	Unattached	Vancouver Whitecaps FC	Free
March 18, 2011	(Argentina) Mauro Rosales	Unattached	Seattle Sounders FC	Free
March 18, 2011	(Belgium) Mikael Yourassowsky	Unattached	Toronto FC	Free
March 19, 2011	(Trinidad and Tobago) Keon Daniel	Puerto Rico Islanders	Philadelphia Union	Free
March 19, 2011	(United States) Gabriel Farfan	Unattached	Philadelphia Union	Free
March 23, 2011	(United States) Calen Carr	Chicago Fire	Houston Dynamo	Trade
March 23, 2011	(United States) Chukwudi Chijindu	Chivas USA	(United States) Los Angeles Blues	Loan
March 23, 2011	(Colombia) Yamith Cuesta	Chivas USA	Chicago Fire	Trade
March 23, 2011	(Ghana) Dominic Oduro	Houston Dynamo	Chicago Fire	Trade
March 24, 2011	(United States) Gabriel Ferrari	Unattached	Chicago Fire	Free
March 24, 2011	(Serbia) Alen Stevanović	(Italy) Torino	Toronto FC	Loan
March 25, 2011	(Canada) Kevin Harmse	Unattached	Vancouver Whitecaps FC	Free
March 25, 2011	(United States) Alex Horwath	Unattached	New York Red Bulls	Free
March 25, 2011	(United States) Matt Luzunaris	Unattached	San Jose Earthquakes	Free
March 29, 2011	(United States) Conor Chinn	Unattached	Real Salt Lake	Free
March 30, 2011	(Republic of Ireland) Danny Earls	Unattached	Colorado Rapids	Free
March 30, 2011	(Canada) Josh Janniere	Toronto FC	Colorado Rapids	Trade
March 31, 2011	(France) Mouloud Akloul	Unattached	Vancouver Whitecaps FC	Free
March 31, 2011	(Liberia) Otto Loewy	Unattached	New England Revolution	Free
March 31, 2011	(Jamaica) Dicoy Williams	Unattached	Toronto FC	Free
April 1, 2011	(South Africa) Danleigh Borman	New York Red Bulls	Toronto FC	Trade
April 1, 2011	(Canada) Dwayne De Rosario	Toronto FC	New York Red Bulls	Trade
April 1, 2011	(Cuba) Maykel Galindo	Chivas USA	FC Dallas	Trade
April 1, 2011	(Cameroon) Tony Tchani	New York Red Bulls	Toronto FC	Trade
April 4, 2011	(Greece) Pari Pantazopoulos	Unattached	Chicago Fire	Free
April 8, 2011	(Denmark) Rajko Lekić	(Denmark) Silkeborg IF	New England Revolution	Undisclosed
April 13, 2011	(Colombia) Diego Chará	(Colombia) Deportes Tolima	Portland Timbers	Undisclosed
April 15, 2011	(France) Aurélien Collin	(Portugal) Vitória de Setúbal	Sporting Kansas City	Undisclosed
April 15, 2011	(England) Richard Eckersley	(England) Burnley	Toronto FC	Loan
April 15, 2011	(Spain) Koke	(Greece) Aris	Houston Dynamo	Undisclosed
April 15, 2011	(Jamaica) Je-Vaughn Watson	Unattached	Houston Dynamo	Free
April 19, 2011	(United States) Benny Feilhaber	(Denmark) AGF Aarhus	New England Revolution	Allocation
April 26, 2011	(Argentina) Santiago Prim	(Argentina) San Lorenzo	Columbus Crew	Undisclosed
April 28, 2011	(United States) Peter Vagenas	Unattached	Vancouver Whitecaps FC	Free
April 29, 2011	(United States) Tim Murray	New England Revolution	(United States) F.C. New York	Loan
April 29, 2011	(Serbia) Ilija Stolica	New England Revolution	(United States) F.C. New York	Loan
May 4, 2011	(Colombia) Cristian Nazarit	(Colombia) Santa Fe	Chicago Fire	Undisclosed
May 5, 2011	(United States) Evan Newton	Houston Dynamo	(United States) FC Tampa Bay	Loan
May 10, 2011	(United States) Seth Sinovic	Unattached	Sporting Kansas City	Free
May 11, 2011	(United States) Kyle Davies	Unattached	Los Angeles Galaxy	Free
May 26, 2011	(Armenia) Artur Aghasyan	Unattached	Real Salt Lake	Free
June 9, 2011	(United States) Ryan Guy	Unattached	New England Revolution	Free
June 13, 2011	(Serbia) Veljko Paunović	Unattached	Philadelphia Union	Free
June 15, 2011	(Uruguay) Gastón Puerari	Chicago Fire	(Mexico) Atlas	Undisclosed
June 18, 2011	(United States) Mike Jones	Unattached	New York Red Bulls	Free
June 27, 2011	(Canada) Dwayne De Rosario	New York Red Bulls	D.C. United	Trade
June 27, 2011	(United States) Dax McCarty	D.C. United	New York Red Bulls	Trade
June 27, 2011	(United States) Brandon McDonald	San Jose Earthquakes	D.C. United	Trade
June 29, 2011	(Germany) Torsten Frings	Unattached	Toronto FC	Free
June 29, 2011	(Netherlands) Danny Koevermans	Unattached	Toronto FC	Free
July 5, 2011	(United States) Soony Saad	Unattached	Sporting Kansas City	Lottery
July 7, 2011	(United States) Jordan Harvey	Philadelphia Union	Vancouver Whitecaps FC	Trade
July 8, 2011	(Mexico) Rafael Baca	Unattached	San Jose Earthquakes	Free
July 12, 2011	(The Gambia) Mustapha Jarju	(Belgium) RAEC Mons	Vancouver Whitecaps FC	Free
July 13, 2011	(Argentina) Sebastián Grazzini	(Argentina) All Boys	Chicago Fire	Undisclosed
July 13, 2011	(Germany) Frank Rost	(Germany) Hamburger SV	New York Red Bulls	Undisclosed
July 14, 2011	(Canada) Nana Attakora	Toronto FC	San Jose Earthquakes	Trade
July 14, 2011	(Canada) Terry Dunfield	Vancouver Whitecaps FC	Toronto FC	Trade
July 14, 2011	(United States) Alan Gordon	Toronto FC	San Jose Earthquakes	Trade
July 14, 2011	(Jamaica) Ryan Johnson	San Jose Earthquakes	Toronto FC	Trade
July 14, 2011	(United States) Jacob Peterson	Toronto FC	San Jose Earthquakes	Trade
July 15, 2011	(France) Léandre Griffit	Columbus Crew	Toronto FC	Trade
July 15, 2011	(England) Andy Iro	Columbus Crew	Toronto FC	Trade
July 15, 2011	(Cameroon) Tony Tchani	Toronto FC	Columbus Crew	Trade
July 16, 2011	(Trinidad and Tobago) Daneil Cyrus	(Trinidad and Tobago) FC Santa Rosa	Sporting Kansas City	Loan
July 16, 2011	(Canada) Greg Sutton	New York Red Bulls	(Canada) Montreal Impact	Loan
July 17, 2011	(Brazil) Jéferson	(Brazil) Vasco da Gama	Sporting Kansas City	Loan
July 18, 2011	(United States) Austin da Luz	New York Red Bulls	D.C. United	Trade
July 20, 2011	(El Salvador) Gerson Mayen	Chivas USA	(United States) Fort Lauderdale Strikers	Loan
July 20, 2011	(Guadeloupe) Eddy Viator	Unattached	Toronto FC	Free
July 21, 2011	(United States) Mike Chabala	Houston Dynamo	Portland Timbers	Trade
July 21, 2011	(Scotland) Adam Moffat	Portland Timbers	Houston Dynamo	Trade
July 21, 2011	(Jamaica) Lovel Palmer	Houston Dynamo	Portland Timbers	Trade
July 21, 2011	(United States) Ryan Pore	Portland Timbers	(Canada) Montreal Impact	Loan
July 22, 2011	(United States) Chris Agorsor	Unattached	Real Salt Lake	Free
July 27, 2011	(Mexico) Pável Pardo	(Mexico) Club América	Chicago Fire	Undisclosed
July 28, 2011	(United States) Dan Gargan	Toronto FC	Chicago Fire	Trade
July 28, 2011	(United States) Dasan Robinson	Chicago Fire	Toronto FC	Trade
July 29, 2011	(United States) Scott Lorenz	Sporting Kansas City	(United States) NSC Minnesota Stars	Loan
July 30, 2011	(United States) Peri Marošević	Unattached	Toronto FC	Free
July 30, 2011	(The Gambia) Amadou Sanyang	Unattached	Seattle Sounders FC	Free
August 2, 2011	(United States) Eric Avila	FC Dallas	Toronto FC	Trade
August 2, 2011	(Argentina) Milton Caraglio	(Argentina) Rosario Central	New England Revolution	Undisclosed
August 2, 2011	(Brazil) Maicon Santos	Toronto FC	FC Dallas	Trade
August 3, 2011	(France) Laurent Courtois	(France) Grenoble Foot 38	Chivas USA	Undisclosed
August 3, 2011	(Brazil) David Lopes	(Romania) Universitatea Craiova	Chivas USA	Undisclosed
August 3, 2011	(Guatemala) Carlos Ruiz	Philadelphia Union	(Mexico) Veracruz	Undisclosed
August 4, 2011	(Honduras) Carlo Costly	(Mexico) Atlas	Houston Dynamo	Loan
August 4, 2011	(Colombia) Daniel Cruz	(Belgium) Beerschot AC	FC Dallas	Undisclosed
August 9, 2011	(Brazil) Luiz Camargo	(Brazil) Paraná Clube	Houston Dynamo	Loan
August 12, 2011	(United States) Freddy Adu	(Portugal) Benfica	Philadelphia Union	Allocation
August 12, 2011	(Guadeloupe) Stéphane Auvray	Sporting Kansas City	New York Red Bulls	Trade
August 15, 2011	(Republic of Ireland) Robbie Keane	(England) Tottenham Hotspur	Los Angeles Galaxy	Undisclosed
August 15, 2011	(Colombia) Miguel Montaño	Seattle Sounders FC	(Canada) Montreal Impact	Loan
August 15, 2011	(United States) Jack Stewart	(United States) NSC Minnesota Stars	FC Dallas	Loan
August 15, 2011	(Ecuador) Edmundo Zura	(Ecuador) El Nacional	San Jose Earthquakes	Loan
August 16, 2011	(United States) Blake Wagner	Unattached	Real Salt Lake	Free
August 17, 2011	(Colombia) Juan Pablo Ángel	Los Angeles Galaxy	Chivas USA	Trade
August 18, 2011	(Morocco) Monsef Zerka	(Greece) Iraklis	New England Revolution	Undisclosed
August 19, 2011	(United States) Eric Alexander	FC Dallas	Portland Timbers	Trade
August 19, 2011	(United States) Jeremy Hall	Portland Timbers	FC Dallas	Trade
August 22, 2011	(Trinidad and Tobago) Thorne Holder	(United States) F.C. New York	Philadelphia Union	Free
August 26, 2011	(United States) Tristan Bowen	Chivas USA	(Belgium) Roeselare	Loan
August 26, 2011	(United States) Sammy Ochoa	(Mexico) Estudiantes Tecos	Seattle Sounders FC	Allocation
September 1, 2011	(Haiti) Peterson Joseph	(Portugal) Braga	Sporting Kansas City	Undisclosed
September 9, 2011	(Guadeloupe) Miguel Comminges	Unattached	Colorado Rapids	Free
September 12, 2011	(United States) Bryan Meredith	(United States) Kitsap Pumas	Seattle Sounders FC	Free
September 13, 2011	(England) Joe Tait	(United States) Dayton Dutch Lions	Philadelphia Union	Free
September 15, 2011	(Cuba) Yordany Álvarez	(United States) Orlando City S.C.	Real Salt Lake	Loan
September 15, 2011	(United States) Kyle Davies	Los Angeles Galaxy	Toronto FC	Trade
September 15, 2011	(United States) Maxwell Griffin	(United States) Orlando City S.C.	San Jose Earthquakes	Loan
September 15, 2011	(United States) Morgan Langley	(United States) Harrisburg City Islanders	Philadelphia Union	Free
September 15, 2011	(Trinidad and Tobago) Carlyle Mitchell	(Trinidad and Tobago) Joe Public	Vancouver Whitecaps FC	Undisclosed
September 15, 2011	(Kenya) Lawrence Olum	(United States) Orlando City S.C.	Sporting Kansas City	Free
September 15, 2011	(United States) Dasan Robinson	Toronto FC	Los Angeles Galaxy	Trade

^{1} Player moved when his contract expired on 1 January 2011.
^{2} Player was never signed, only rights to player were acquired.
