= Wingert =

Wingert is a surname. Notable people with the surname include:

- Chris Wingert (born 1982), American soccer player
- Emmert L. Wingert (1899–1971), American jurist
- Harry Shindle Wingert (1865–1928), American football coach
- Lutz Wingert (born 1958), German philosopher
- Mick Wingert (born 1974), American comedian and voice actor
- Norm Wingert (born 1950), American soccer player
- Rebekah Wingert-Jabi, American documentary filmmaker
- Wally Wingert (born 1961), American actor and voice actor
- Kelsey Wingert, American sports reporter

== See also ==
- Wingert House, a historic farmhouse in Chicago, Illinois, United States
- Wingert Lake, a lake in Warsaw, Poland
- Wengert
