= Wengert =

Wengert is a German surname that may refer to:

- Andreas Wengert (born 1944), Olympic sailor from Brazil
- Don Wengert (born 1969), American former professional baseball pitcher
- Nina Wengert (born 1984), German rower
- Norman Wengert (1916–2001), American political scientist
- Paul Wengert (born 1952), Mayor of Augsburg in Bavaria

== See also ==
- Wenger
- Wingert
