= Raymond Burse =

American college administrator

Raymond M. Burse is an American attorney, businessman, and academic leader.

== Personal life ==
Raymond Burse was born in Hopkinsville, Kentucky, in 1951. He is the youngest of 11 siblings. He graduated from Christian County High School in 1969, ranking 10th in a class of 325 students. His father, Joe Burse, worked at Hygrade Meat Packing Company and died at the age of 84. Growing up in the South during the Civil Rights Movement presented struggles for Burse, but he was able to overcome these obstacles. His father attended school only until the 3rd grade, while his mother completed the 7th grade. Determined to instill perseverance, his parents demanded hard work from him, which is a key reason he balanced academics and athletics so well, ultimately earning the Rhodes Scholarship. He learned the importance of waiting his turn and being grateful, as money was tight for his parents while supporting all 12 siblings.

His father's significant influence on him is a major reason why Burse has become a motivational speaker. Lena and Joe Burse believed that a good education would serve him well throughout his life. During high school, he competed in track and field, and football, earning the title of captain in both sports. Burse was a well-rounded student in his early years with a strong work ethic and numerous academic achievements.

When he graduated, he turned down multiple scholarships to pursue a chemistry major at Centre College. Raymond Burse has three children: Ray Jr., Eric, and Justin. His oldest son, Ray Burse Jr., is a soccer player who played for Ohio State and was subsequently drafted into Major League Soccer (MLS). He has played for several MLS teams and has received the Player of the Match award in multiple games. Eric Burse is a journalist for the Courier-Journal and has written an article about his father. Justin Burse attended Georgetown Law and is now an executive lawyer handling financial matters in Kentucky. Raymond Burse is married to Kim Burse, and they currently reside in Prospect, KY. Kim attended the University of Kentucky, where she majored in economics. She shares similarities with Raymond, having experience serving on various boards of directors in Kentucky. Like Raymond, she is retired but still dedicates her free time to helping young people find careers..

Raymond Burse
- Born: Hopkinsville, Kentucky
- Education: Centre College
- Occupations: Lawyer; College administrator Businessman
- Employer: University of Louisville

== College education ==
After graduating from high school, Raymond Burse attended Centre College in Danville, KY, where he majored in chemistry and mathematics. During his time at Centre, he was involved in several organizations, including the Black-White Coalition and the American Chemical Society. He also served as vice president of Omicron Delta Kappa and founded the Black Student Union, serving as president for three years. Burse acted as an advisor to the president of Centre College and was the treasurer of the "C" Club. He earned a spot on the dean's list every year.

Additionally, Burse continued to participate in sports during college. In recognition of his athletic achievements, Burse was inducted into Centre College's Hall of Fame in 1997 (Class of 1973). He was named to the all-conference team in football and was the Most Valuable Player on offense in 1972. He also won the Collegiate Athletic Conference (CAC) high jump championship in 1973 and was the CAC champion in the high hurdles as a sophomore.

After earning his bachelor's degree in 1973, Burse received several honors, including being named to Who's Who in American Colleges and Universities, winning the Fred M. Vinson Honor Award, and receiving a Rhodes Scholarship. This led him to study at Oxford University in England from 1973 to 1975, where he focused on organic chemistry and participated in multiple sports, including basketball, track, crew, and rugby. Although Burse initially planned to attend medical school, he later decided to pursue a career in law. He returned to the U.S. in 1975 to attend Harvard Law School, where he earned his Juris Doctor degree in 1978.

== Advocacy and philanthropy ==
=== Philanthropy while at Kentucky State University ===
Throughout his life, Raymond has contributed to and advocated for campaigns and causes across the state of Kentucky, from his hometown of Hopkinsville to Louisville and the Kentucky Commission on Human Rights. While president of Kentucky State University, one of the most notable acts of advocacy he undertook was slashing his own pay by $90,000 so the 24 least paid campus workers - who were making $10.25 an hour - could receive higher pay by a 40% increase. During his term as president in 2014, Burse also completed KSU football player Deshon Floyd's goal of an internship abroad by paying the remaining $2,000 the player needed, and he offered school shooting survivor Javaugntay Burroughs a full scholarship later that year. Burse stated on the topic of the student's parents that "With all the things they had to deal with, one of the things they shouldn't have to deal with is whether this young man was going to be able to go to college."

=== Community efforts after leaving Kentucky State ===
After his time at Kentucky State, Burse shifted his attention and energy to efforts in and around his community. Alongside his wife and others in the Louisville community, he became a key contributor to the Louisville Force for Good Campaign, one of the major focuses of the Community Foundation of Louisville which is a multifaceted non profit organization that focuses on and provides resources for the Louisville community, from fundraising to philanthropy and its flagship program, the Greater Louisville Project. He also served as the president of the Louisville NAACP chapter, taking over after the previous president's 23-year term. Burse stated that he would focus on police accountability through DOJ degrees and a smooth transition of Jefferson County Public Schools leadership and reinstating transportation to magnet and charter schools. Burse received the Living Legacy award from the Kentucky Black Legislative Caucus, recognizing his personal and career achievements, particularly during his time as KSU president.

== Career ==
=== Early career ===
After graduating from Harvard Law School in 1978, Raymond Burse went to Louisville, Kentucky. There, he began his law career with Wyatt, Tarrant, and Combs. Some say while in Louisville he became a "dynamic civil leader", becoming involved with many organizations. He was involved with several local and regional institutions, the Louisville Public Library Advisory Commission, the Kentucky YMCA, and the Prichard Committee for Academic Excellence.

=== Kentucky State President (1st term) ===
His career changed direction in 1982 when he became the President of Kentucky State University, serving as the university's 9th president. He was 30 when chosen for this position, making him the youngest college or university president in the nation. "During his first tenure, his main responsibility was implementing the components of Kentucky's new federally mandated desegregation plan". Burse became widely recognized for his significant improvements to student enrollment, quality of education and institutions, as well as using his legal and corporate expertise to make significant contributions to the university. Some of his most significant accomplishments include securing over 60 million dollars in funding for campus improvements and the opening of Whitney M. Young College of Leadership Studies. After seven years of serving as the president of Kentucky State University, he stepped down in 1989.

=== GE Appliances and Lighting ===
After stepping down from his work at KSU, Raymond Burse returned to his first firm, Wyatt, Tarrant, and Combs. In 1995, he accepted a position at GE Appliances and Lighting as General Counsel. He eventually worked his way up, becoming vice president and General Counsel from May 2002 until August 2012. After his 17 years working here, he resigned and returned to Kentucky State University.

=== Alabama A&M ===
In 2006, Burse was appointed as an Alabama A&M Trustee by Governor Bob Riley. He wrote a letter to the governor to resign from that position stating that he was "personally ridiculed and attacked". This was not his first run-in with the university, in 1996 the board elected him as president, however disagreements over salary meant he never accepted the job .

=== Return to Kentucky State University ===
After working at GE Appliances and Lighting, he returned to Kentucky State University as interim president, replacing Mary Evan Sias. Throughout his second term as president of KSU, he was met with a variety of challenges. However, the KSU board was confident in his ability, saying, "His knowledge of KSU, his commitment to higher education, and his executive leadership experience will be assets during the 2014-2015 academic year." One of the most pressing matters for KSU as Raymond Burse became interim president was the seven million dollar budget deficit. This was primarily due to the unpaid tuition of 645 students of the university, with some debts, "as high as $40,000". To address this, Burse decided to unenroll around a quarter of KSU's students due to unpaid bills, allowing enrollment once again when paid. He gave the statement, "They moved into dorms, and were going to classes, but had not fulfilled their financial obligations." Additionally, in order to continue to clear the budget deficit, Burse announced numerous staff reductions and budget cuts which would cut spending by $950,000 in 2014 and $2.1 million in 2015. These cuts included $500,000 being taken from the athletic department budget over two years, as well as eliminating 18 full-time staff jobs and 32 teaching jobs, with those jobs being transferred to full-time employees. Burse recognized the impact of these budget cuts, and soon following he gained recognition for sacrificing $90,000, approximately a quarter of his salary, to increase wages for some of the university's lowest-paid employees, giving some a pay increase from $7.25 an hour to $10.25. After serving as interim president for two years, Burse resigned in May 2016 to return to Louisville with his family.

=== Discrimination lawsuit ===
In April 2016, two employees of KSU from Lexington, KY, filed a federal discrimination lawsuit against KSU and Raymond Burse. This lawsuit contained numerous allegations against Burse by Maifan Silitonga and Teferi Tsegaye. In 2014, KSU hired a caucasian woman as media and communications manager. Soon after Burse became president of KSU, and was unhappy, saying that the woman selected was not included in the 'selection criteria'. Burse blamed Tsegaye, who was involved in the hiring and interviewing process. However, Tsegaye claimed it was not his fault, as they were not in charge of reviewing hiring requirements. Burse then said "The university needed more 'people like me' while tapping his wrist," (Kentucky). This led Tsegaye to believe Burse was displeased because the woman was white. In March 2015, Burse instructed Tsegaye and Silitonga to fire the Director of the Rosenwald Center for Families and Children. They did not understand the purpose of the termination, and Burse did not provide any reasoning except that the director did not "represent" the university. Silitonga and Tsegaye interpreted that they were terminated because they were caucasian. The allegations claim that in April 2015, Burse began to pressure Tsegaye to resign, but Tsegaye refused. In June, Tsegaye was informed that he was demoted from vice president and dean/director of the College of Agriculture to a tenured professor at the university, including a $30,000 salary cut. Silitonga made additional claims, saying that Burse repeatedly humiliated them in front of their colleagues. Silitonga eventually was fired due to insubordination in June 2015. The lawsuit was eventually settled in 2018, with the details remaining confidential.

=== University of Louisville ===
In July 2017, Governor Matt Bevin appointed Burse to the University of Louisville Board of Trustees, replacing Junior Bridgeman who resigned earlier that year. Bevin described Burse as a "thoughtful leader". However, not everyone shares that opinion. Peter Smith, who was faculty senate president at KSU with him described his leadership as "brusque and negative" also stating that "When you treat people the way he did, it generates a lot of opposition". Burse was set to serve the rest of the term, which expired on January 13, 2019.

=== NAACP ===
Raymond Burse served as the 1st Vice President of the NAACP Louisville Branch, until taking over as president in December 2024, replacing Rauol Cunningham. Both have similar goals, striving to bring back transportation to magnet and charter schools and police accountability. During the ceremony, Burse says "We got to be in a position to review and evaluate the data and information on the Louisville Metro Police Department (LMPD) as it comes forward to be able to do that. So that's number one priority".
