= Alex Fraga =

Brazilian footballer (born 1986)

Personal information
- Full name: Alex José de Oliveira Fraga
- Date of birth: May 22, 1986 (age 40)
- Place of birth: Alto Paraná, Brazil
- Height: 1.80 m (5 ft 11 in)
- Position: Centre back

Team information
- Current team: J. Malucelli

Youth career
- 2002–2003: PSTC-PR
- 2004–2005: Atlético Paranaense B

Senior career*
Years	Team	Apps	(Gls)
2006–2010	Atlético Paranaense	26	(0)
2009	→ Ituano (loan)	6	(0)
2009–2010	→ Olimpi Rustavi (loan)	31	(1)
2011	Náutico	3	(0)
2012–	J. Malucelli	64	(0)
- * Club domestic league appearances and goals

Alex José de Oliveira Fraga (born May 22, 1986), is a Brazilian central back who plays for J. Malucelli.

== Career ==
Alex Fraga began his career in the youth ranks of Atlético Paranaense and helped his side capture the Dallas Cup in 2004 and 2005. He made his professional debut with Atlético-PR in 2-2 home draw against Iraty in the Campeonato Paranaense on February 25, 2006. In 2009, he was loaned to Ituano and played in the Paulista league.

After a brief stay with Ituano, Fraga joined Georgian Premier League side Olimpi Rustavi on loan for the 2009-10 season. In his one year in Georgia Fraga started 31 games and scored one goal in helping Olimpi Rustavi to capture its second Georgian League title.

== Honours ==
- Atlético Paranaense
  - Dallas Cup: 2004, 2005
- Olimpi Rustavi
  - Georgian Premier League:2009-10
