= Andrés Mendoza (Peruvian footballer) =

Peruvian footballer (born 1978)

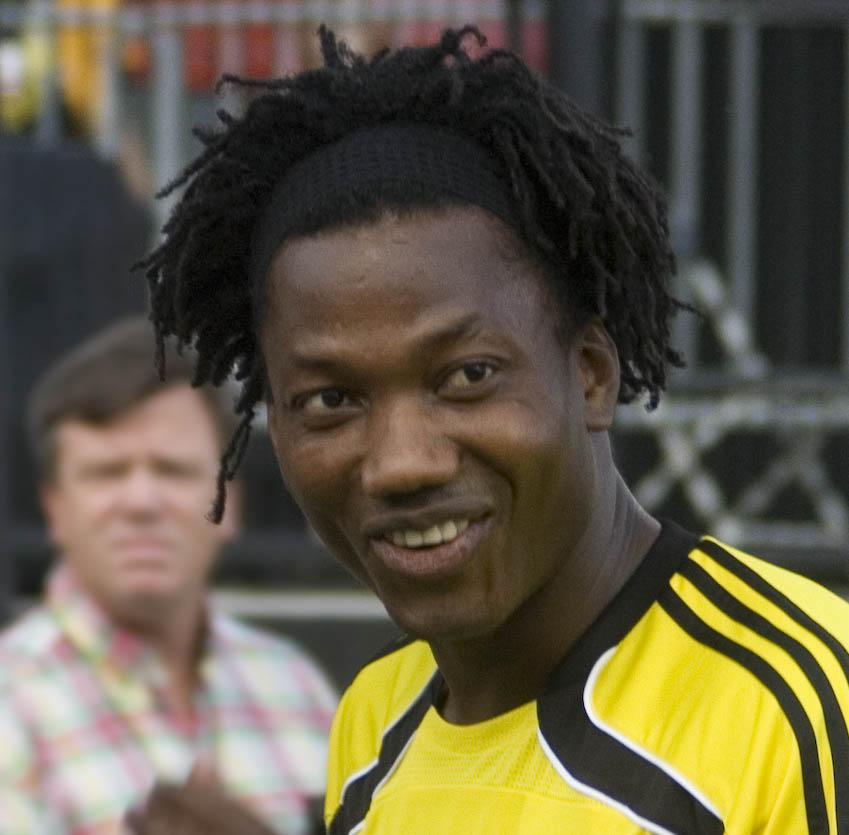
- Mendoza with Columbus Crew

Personal information
- Full name: Andrés Augusto Mendoza Acevedo
- Date of birth: 26 April 1978 (age 48)
- Place of birth: Chincha Alta, Peru
- Height: 1.88 m (6 ft 2 in)
- Position: Forward

Senior career*
Years	Team	Apps	(Gls)
1996–1999	Sporting Cristal	100	(31)
2000–2004	Club Brugge	129	(54)
2004–2007	Metalurh Donetsk	51	(22)
2005	→ Marseille (loan)	11	(1)
2006	→ Dynamo Moscow (loan)	3	(0)
2008	Steaua București	15	(2)
2008–2009	Morelia	27	(13)
2009–2010	Diyarbakırspor	15	(5)
2010–2011	Columbus Crew	37	(15)
2011–2012	Atlante	11	(2)
2013	Pacífico	27	(4)
2014	Alianza Universidad	6	(0)
Total		432	(149)

International career
1999–2007	Peru	44	(7)
- * Club domestic league appearances and goals

Andrés Augusto Mendoza Acevedo (Note: In this Spanish name, the first or paternal surname is Mendoza and the second or maternal family name is Azevedo.) (born 26 April 1978), known as Andrés Mendoza, is a Peruvian former professional footballer who played as a forward.

== Club career ==
Mendoza was born in Chincha Alta. He started playing professionally with Sporting Cristal, which he helped become national champion in his first season.

Subsequently, he represented a myriad of teams, in Belgium, Ukraine, Russia, Romania and France. He had a steady period with Club Brugge, helping it win the 2002 Belgian Cup, with a hat-trick in a 3–1 one win over Excelsior Mouscron, while also netting the game's only in a 1–0 success at AC Milan, in the 2003-04 UEFA Champions League.

In 2004, Mendoza signed with Metalurh Donetsk, which loaned him twice during his link. After his release, he moved countries again in 2008: after a short spell with Steaua Bucureşti, he joined Monarcas Morelia in Mexico, being the second best goalscorer in the league's Apertura 2008, with 10 goals in 16 games.

In 2010, Mendoza signed with Columbus Crew of Major League Soccer as a Designated Player. He was released by the club at the end of the 2011 season, as "he did not mesh with the players or coaches and was considered a liability."

== International career ==
Mendoza made his debut with Peru in 1999, becoming a regular fixture in the following years. He represented the nation at two Copa América tournaments: 2004 and 2007, totalling seven scoreless appearances.

After a failed campaign to qualify for the 2006 FIFA World Cup, he was called by national coach Julio César Uribe for a two-friendly match squad against Ecuador, in June 2007. He was used as a substitute the first game against their northern neighbors (win), and started in the second (2–0 loss).

On 7 December 2007, Mendoza was one in a group of internationals that were found guilty of having introduced women and alcohol into the national squad's hotel two days before Peru's away drubbing at the hands of Ecuador (5–1, in which he scored), being subsequently banned for one and a half years from representing Peru. Months later he was the only one who did not get his suspension eliminated after all the other player's suspensions were reduced.

== Career statistics ==
Scores and results list Peru's goal tally first.

#	Date	Venue	Opponent	Score	Result	Competition
1.	10 February 1999	Estadio Nacional, Lima, Peru	Ecuador	1–0	1–2	Friendly
2.	17 February 1999	Estadio Isidro Romero, Guayaquil, Ecuador	Ecuador	2–0	2–0	Friendly
3.	27 March 2001	Estadio Nacional, Lima, Peru	Chile	2–1	3–1	2002 FIFA World Cup qualification
4.	11 June 2003	Giants Stadium, East Rutherford, United States	Ecuador	2–1	2–2	Friendly
5.	6 September 2003	Estadio Nacional, Lima, Peru	Paraguay	4–1	4–1	2006 FIFA World Cup qualification
6.	9 September 2003	Estadio Nacional, Santiago, Chile	Chile	1–1	1–2	2006 FIFA World Cup qualification
7.	21 November 2007	Estadio Olímpico Atahualpa, Quito, Ecuador	Ecuador	1–5	1–5	2010 FIFA World Cup qualification

== Honours ==
Sporting Cristal

- Peruvian League: 1996
- Clausura Tournament: 1998
- Libertadores Cup runner-up: 1997

Club Brugge

- Belgian League: 2002–03
- Belgian Cup: 2001–02, 2003–04
- Belgian Supercup: 2002, 2003
- Bruges Matins: 2000, 2001, 2004

Marseille

- UEFA Intertoto Cup: 2005

Monarcas Morelia

- InterLiga runner-up: 2009
