= Alto Paraná, Paraná =

Alto Paraná
- Municipality
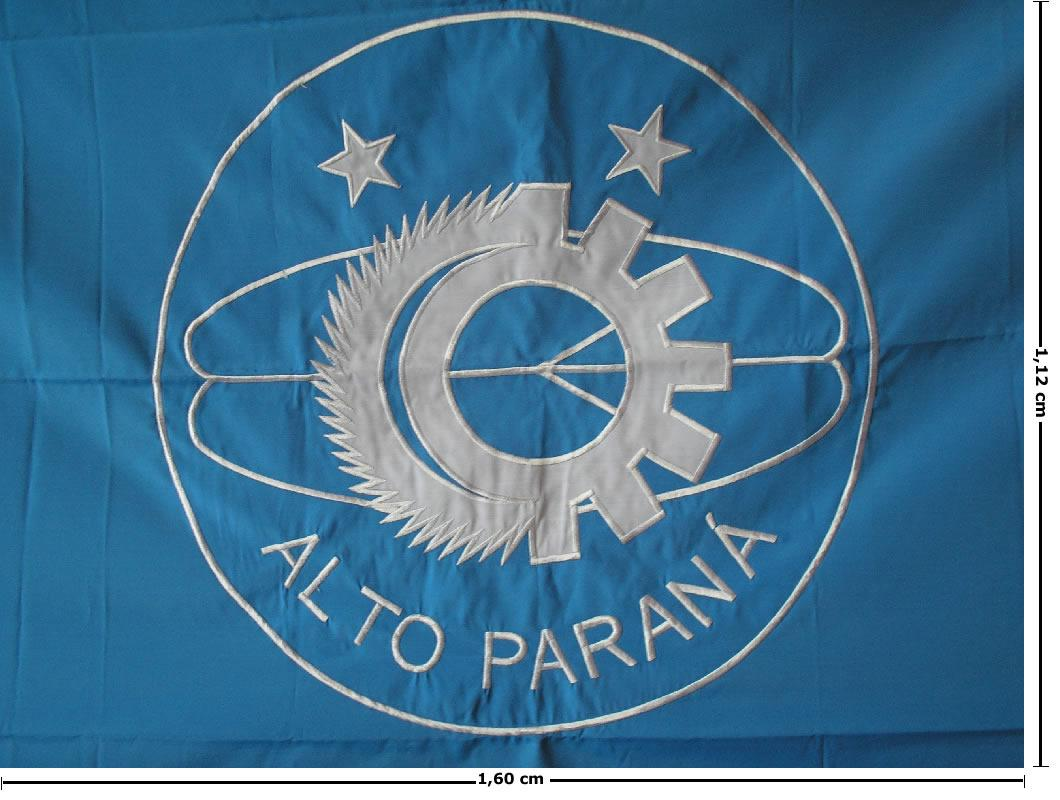
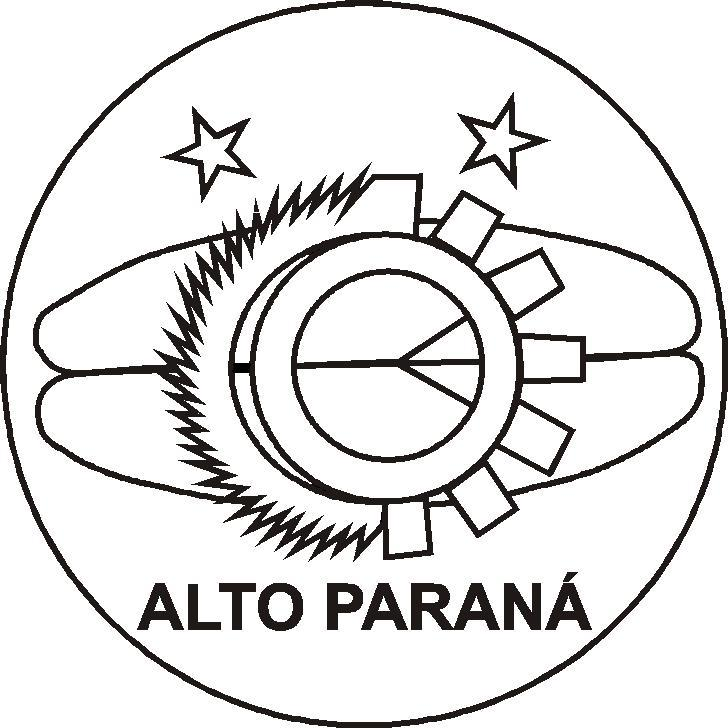
- Flag Seal
- Interactive map of Alto Paraná
- Coordinates: 23°07′54″S 52°19′16″W
- Country: Brazil
- Region: Southern
- State: Paraná
- Mesoregion: Noroeste Paranaense

Population (2020)
  - Total: 14,859
- Time zone: UTC−3 (BRT)

Alto Paraná is a municipality in the state of Paraná in the Southern Region of Brazil.

== See also ==
- List of municipalities in Paraná
