= Norm Wingert =

American soccer player

Personal information
- Full name: Norman Wingert
- Date of birth: April 18, 1950 (age 76)
- Place of birth: New York, New York, United States
- Height: 5 ft 11 in (1.80 m)
- Position: Goalkeeper

Youth career
- 1969–1971: Hartwick College

Senior career*
Years	Team	Apps	(Gls)
1973–1975	Philadelphia Atoms	11	(0)
1976	New York Apollo		
- * Club domestic league appearances and goals

Norman "Norm" Wingert (born April 18, 1950) is an American former professional soccer player who played as a goalkeeper. He played in the North American Soccer League between 1973 and 1975 for the Philadelphia Atoms. His son Chris is also a professional footballer.

Wingert attended Hartwick College where he played soccer from 1969 to 1971. He then played for the Philadelphia Atoms of the North American Soccer League from 1973 to 1975. In 1976, he played for the New York Apollo of the American Soccer League.

Norm is the father of Chris Wingert who played as a defender for Real Salt Lake.
