= Ray Burse =

American soccer player (born 1984)

Personal information
- Full name: Ray Burse, Jr.
- Date of birth: October 2, 1984 (age 42)
- Place of birth: Prospect, Kentucky, United States
- Height: 1.86 m (6 ft 1 in)
- Position: Goalkeeper

College career
Years	Team	Apps	(Gls)
2002–2005	Ohio State Buckeyes		

Senior career*
Years	Team	Apps	(Gls)
2005	Chicago Fire Premier	10	(0)
2006–2009	FC Dallas	25	(0)
2008	→ Portland Timbers (loan)	13	(0)
2011	Columbus Crew	0	(0)
2011	Puerto Rico Islanders	26	(0)
2012	Carolina RailHawks	24	(0)
- * Club domestic league appearances and goals

Ray Burse Jr. (born October 2, 1984) is an American former professional soccer player who played as a goalkeeper.

== Career ==
=== College and amateur ===
Burse was born in Prospect, Kentucky. He attended St. Xavier High School in Louisville, Kentucky, and played college soccer at Ohio State University. His 162 career saves and 1.11 goals against average (GAA) has left him as one of OSU's best goalkeepers to date. In high school Burse was named an All-American playing as a forward.

In 2005 Burse also played for Chicago Fire Premier in the USL Premier Development League, finishing the year with an impressive 0.68 GAA.

=== Professional ===
Burse was drafted in the third round of the 2006 MLS Superdraft and played on the F.C. Dallas reserve squad. During the 2006 season for FC Dallas, Burse made no first team starts, but was regular on the reserve squad. Burse made his professional debut in Dallas' 1–1 draw with C.D. Guadalajara in the opening match of the SuperLiga on July 24, 2007. He made his first MLS league appearance in a 1–0 win against Colorado Rapids on August 4, 2007. In 2008, he was loaned out to the Portland Timbers of the USL First Division. He returned to Dallas on June 4, 2008, after starting in ten games and recording six clean sheets. He made his first of two starts on June 1, 2008, in a 2–1 loss against the Colorado Rapids. Ray served as the backup goalie in 20 regular-season games for FC Dallas during the 2008 MLS regular season.

Burse signed a short-term contract with the Columbus Crew on February 19, 2011 due to injuries to the team's top two goalkeepers He made two starts for the Black & Gold in both legs of the Crew's 2010-2011 CONCACAF Champions League quarterfinal series against Real Salt Lake. In game one on February 22, 2011, in Columbus Crew Stadium, Burse went on to post a shutout in the 0–0 stalemate. He was named the player of the match via text message voting by fans. On March 15, 2011, he was released by the Crew. On March 29, 2011, it was announced that the Puerto Rico Islanders of the North American Soccer League had signed Burse for the 2011 season. This season proved to be a tremendous comeback for Burse. He anchored the Islanders' defense to one of the best goals against average in the league and a play off berth.

== Personal life ==
He is the oldest of the three sons of Raymond Burse.
