= Dejan Rusmir =

Serbian retired footballer (born 1980)

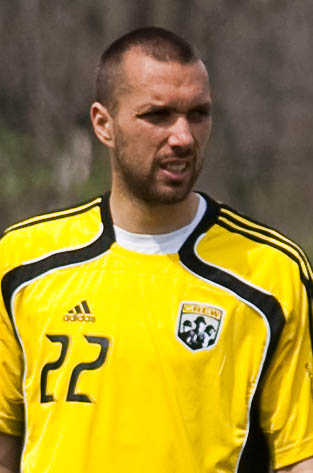
- Rusmir with Columbus Crew in 2011

Personal information
- Date of birth: January 28, 1980 (age 46)
- Place of birth: Belgrade, SFR Yugoslavia
- Height: 1.84 m (6 ft 1/2 in)
- Position: Midfielder

Senior career*
Years	Team	Apps	(Gls)
1997–2001	Radnički Jugopetrol	77	(18)
2001–2003	Partizan	10	(0)
2003–2006	Rad	94	(26)
2006–2008	Ceahlăul Piatra Neamț	53	(10)
2008–2010	Farul Constanța	34	(6)
2011	Columbus Crew	18	(0)
2012	Olympiakos Nicosia	14	(0)
2013	Hajduk Kula	14	(1)
2013–2015	Novi Pazar	48	(5)
2015	Zemun	12	(2)
2016	Rad	6	(0)
Total		380	(68)
- * Club domestic league appearances and goals as of 16 January 2017

Dejan Rusmir (Serbian Cyrillic: Дејан Русмир; born January 28, 1980) is a Serbian retired footballer.

== Career ==
=== Serbia ===
Rusmir began his career in the youth ranks of Radnički Jugopetrol. After impressing with Radnički, Rusmir moved to top Serbian club Partizan. While with Partizan, Rusmir was part of the squads that captured the 2001–02 and 2002–03 First League titles. In 2003, he left Partizan and moved to Rad where he remained for three years.

=== Romania ===
In 2006, Rusmir signed with newly promoted Romanian Liga I side Ceahlăul Piatra Neamț and quickly established himself as the club's attacking midfielder. In his two seasons with the club, Rusmir appeared in 53 Liga I matches and scored 10 goals. For the 2008–09 Liga I season Rusmir joined Farul Constanța and appeared in 27 league matches, scoring 5 goals, however he was unable to help Farul avoid relegation to Liga II. For the 2009–10 season, Rusmir remained with Farul and played in Liga II appearing in 10 league matches and scoring 1 goal.

=== United States ===
In February 2011, Rusmir went on trial with Major League Soccer's Columbus Crew. He was included on the Crew's roster heading into the team's 2011 CONCACAF Champions League quarterfinal series against Real Salt Lake., and formally signed with the team on March 9, 2011. He played his first league game with the Crew on March 19, 2011 in the 2011 MLS season opener against D.C. United. Rusmir was released by Columbus on November 23, 2011.

=== Cyprus ===
In January 2012, Rusmir signed for Cypriot First Division club Olympiakos Nicosia for 6 months.
