= Santiago Prim =

Argentine footballer

Personal information
- Full name: Santiago Prim
- Date of birth: May 11, 1990 (age 36)
- Place of birth: Campana, Argentina
- Height: 5 ft 10 in (1.78 m)
- Position: Midfielder

Team information
- Current team: Acassuso

Youth career
- 2008–2009: San Lorenzo

Senior career*
Years	Team	Apps	(Gls)
2009–2011	San Lorenzo	2	(0)
2011	Columbus Crew	0	(0)
2012	Rampla Juniors	5	(0)
2012–2014	Villa Dálmine	31	(4)
2014–	Acassuso	41	(3)
- * Club domestic league appearances and goals as of 11 May 2015

Santiago Prim (born May 11, 1990, in Campana) is an Argentine footballer who currently plays as a midfielder for Acassuso.

== Club career ==
Prim began his career in the youth ranks of storied Argentine side San Lorenzo. He made his professional debut on September 26, 2009, in a 3–2 victory over Tigre.

In early 2011 Prim went on trial with Columbus Crew of Major League Soccer. After a second trial stint, Prim signed with Columbus on April 27, 2011. Columbus released Prim on November 23, 2011.

In January 2012, he signed a new deal with the Uruguayan team Rampla Juniors.
