= Chris Wingert =

American soccer player (born 1982)

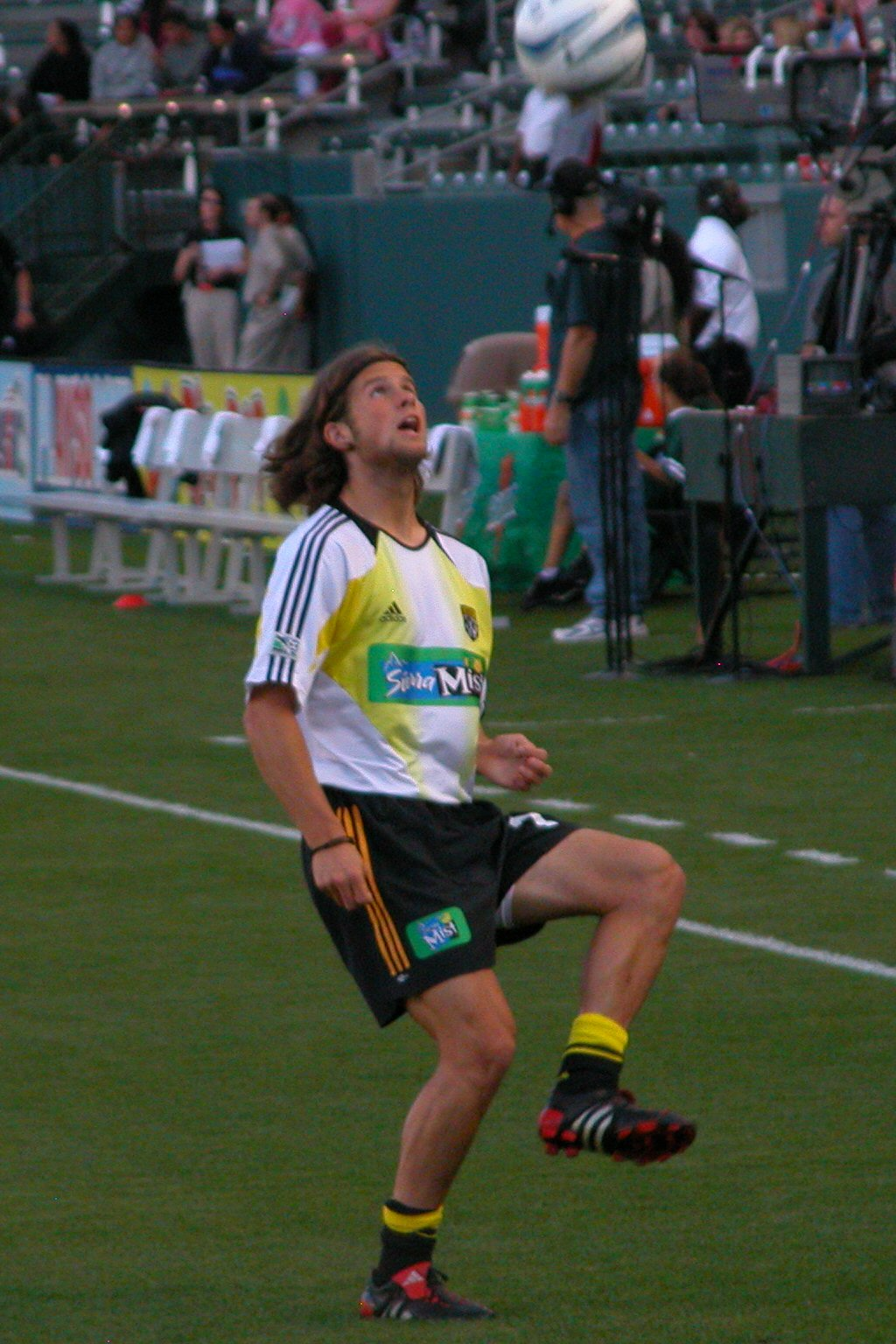

Personal information
- Full name: Chris Wingert
- Date of birth: June 16, 1982 (age 44)
- Place of birth: Babylon, New York, United States
- Height: 5 ft 11 in (1.80 m)
- Position: Defender

College career
Years	Team	Apps	(Gls)
2000–2003	St. John's Red Storm		

Senior career*
Years	Team	Apps	(Gls)
2003	Brooklyn Knights	12	(1)
2004–2005	Columbus Crew	49	(0)
2006–2007	Colorado Rapids	16	(0)
2007–2014	Real Salt Lake	204	(1)
2015–2016	New York City FC	28	(0)
2016–2017	Real Salt Lake	43	(1)
2018	New York Cosmos B	4	(1)
Total		356	(4)

International career^{‡}
2002–2004	United States U23	16	(0)
2009	United States	1	(0)
- * Club domestic league appearances and goals as of August 14, 2018 ‡ National team caps and goals as of September 22, 2013

Chris Wingert (born June 16, 1982) is an American former professional soccer player. He spent fourteen seasons of his professional career in Major League Soccer (MLS) with the Columbus Crew, Colorado Rapids, Real Salt Lake, and New York City FC, before finishing his career with New York Cosmos B in the National Premier Soccer League. He was a starting defender with Real Salt Lake's MLS Cup Championship team in 2009.

== Career ==
=== College ===
Wingert attended St. John the Baptist Diocesan High School and played college soccer for St. John's University, where he was the 2003 Hermann Trophy winner as that year's best collegiate player.

During his college years Wingert also played with the Brooklyn Knights in the USL Premier Development League.

=== Professional ===
The Columbus Crew drafted Wingert in the second round (twelfth overall) in the 2004 MLS SuperDraft. Despite his collegiate success, MLS teams were skeptical about his ability to adapt to the faster and more physical professional game. Nevertheless, Wingert managed to earn a spot on a very good Crew team and was a versatile member of the squad for two years. While in Columbus, he played as both a defender and a defensive midfielder. On January 20, 2006, the Crew traded Wingert to Colorado Rapids for a fourth-round pick in the 2007 MLS SuperDraft.

On July 13, 2007, Real Salt Lake acquired Wingert from Colorado for a first-round pick in the 2008 MLS Supplemental Draft and a second-round pick in the 2009 supplemental draft.

After eight years with Salt Lake, Wingert was selected in the tenth round of the 2014 MLS Expansion Draft by expansion club New York City FC. The club also selected fellow Salt Lake teammate Ned Grabavoy.

Wingert was waived by New York City on January 30, 2016. Three days later, on February 2, he was claimed off of waivers by Real Salt Lake, starting his second stint with the club. He announced his retirement as a professional soccer player on February 19, 2018.

=== International ===
Wingert made his first international appearance for the United States against Sweden on January 24, 2009.

=== Personal ===
Wingert is the son of Norm Wingert who played for the Philadelphia Atoms in the North American Soccer League.

== Honors ==
=== Real Salt Lake ===
- Major League Soccer MLS Cup (1): 2009
- Major League Soccer Eastern Conference Championship (1): 2009
- Major League Soccer Western Conference Championship (1): 2013
