= Alex Riggs =

American soccer player

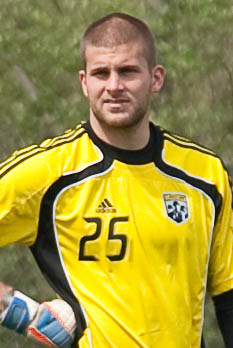
- Riggs with the Columbus Crew in 2011

Personal information
- Date of birth: March 17, 1988 (age 38)
- Place of birth: Saint Peters, Missouri, United States
- Height: 6 ft 4 in (1.93 m)
- Position: Goalkeeper

Youth career
- 2006–2010: Missouri State Bears

Senior career*
Years	Team	Apps	(Gls)
2011	Columbus Crew	0	(0)
2015	Saint Louis FC	1	(0)
2015	→ Sporting Kansas City (loan)	0	(0)
- * Club domestic league appearances and goals as of October 15, 2015

Alex Riggs (born March 17, 1988) is an American soccer player who plays as a goalkeeper.

== Career ==
=== College ===
Riggs played for Missouri State University from 2006 to 2010. He was named the Missouri Valley Conference Defender of the Year in 2009, and Missouri Valley Conference Goalkeeper of the Year in 2010.

=== Professional ===
Riggs signed with the Columbus Crew of Major League Soccer in 2011, but did not appear in any games with the club.

In April 2015, Riggs signed with United Soccer League expansion side Saint Louis FC. He was loaned out later that season to MLS club Sporting Kansas City for a U.S. Open Cup match against FC Dallas, but remained on the bench as an unused substitute. He made his first professional start against Louisville City at World Wide Technology Soccer Park on September 19, 2015.
