= Korey Veeder =

American soccer player (born 1991)

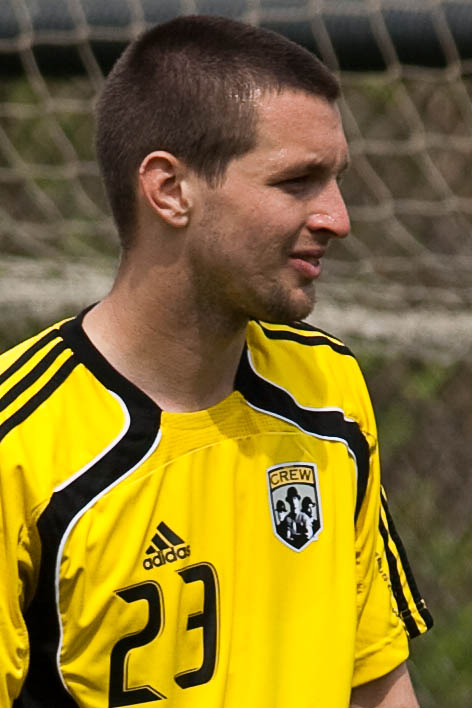

Personal information
- Full name: Korey Paul Veeder
- Date of birth: October 3, 1991 (age 35)
- Place of birth: St. Petersburg, Florida, United States
- Height: 5 ft 11 in (1.80 m)
- Position: Defender

Youth career
- 2005–2009: Clearwater Chargers
- 2007–2008: IMG Soccer Academy

Senior career*
Years	Team	Apps	(Gls)
2010	Crystal Palace Baltimore	20	(0)
2011–2012	Columbus Crew	0	(0)
2013	New York Cosmos	4	(0)

International career^{‡}
2007–2008	United States U17	21	(0)
2010–2011	United States U20	7	(0)
- * Club domestic league appearances and goals as of April 21, 2014 ‡ National team caps and goals as of February 12, 2011

Korey Veeder (born October 3, 1991, in St. Petersburg, Florida) is an American former soccer player who is currently without a club.

== Career ==
=== Youth ===
Veeder attended Dixie Hollins High School in St. Petersburg, Florida, and played club soccer with the Clearwater Chargers Soccer Club in Clearwater, Florida from 2005 to 2008. He was named to the NSCAA/ADIDAS All-American Team in 2007 and 2008.

=== Professional ===
Veeder signed his first professional contract in 2010 when he was signed by Crystal Palace Baltimore of the USSF Division 2 Professional League. He made his professional debut on May 1, 2010, in a game against Rochester Rhinos, and went on to make 20 appearances for the Eagles over the course of the season.

On February 11, 2011, Veeder signed a contract with MLS and took part in a weighed lottery four days later. On that day, the lottery sent Veeder to the Columbus Crew who had a 19.31% chance of landing him. Other clubs participating were Toronto FC who had a 45.52% chance of landing him, Seattle Sounders FC with a 24.83% chance and the Colorado Rapids who had a 10.34% chance.

Veeder was waived by Columbus on June 27, 2012.

=== International ===
Veeder was a member of the elite US U-17 National Team residency program in Bradenton, Florida from 2007 to 2008, representing his country on 21 occasions. He was called up to the US U-20 team in September 2010 for a tournament in Peru.

== Career statistics ==
(correct as of 2 October 2010)

Club	Season	League			Cup			Play-Offs			Total		
Club	Season	Apps	Goals	Assists	Apps	Goals	Assists	Apps	Goals	Assists	Apps	Goals	Assists
Crystal Palace Baltimore	2010	20	0	1	1	0	0	-	-	-	21	0	1
Columbus Crew	2012	0	0	0	0	0	0	-	-	-	0	0	0
New York Cosmos	2013	0	0	0	0	0	0	-	-	-	0	0	0
Crystal Palace Baltimore Total	2010	20	0	1	1	0	0	-	-	-	21	0	1
Columbus Crew Total	2012	0	0	0	0	0	0	-	-	-	0	0	0
New York Cosmos Total	2013	0	0	0	0	0	0	-	-	-	0	0	0
Career Total	2010–present	20	0	1	1	0	0	-	-	-	21	0	1
