= Sebastián Miranda =

Chilean footballer (born 1980)

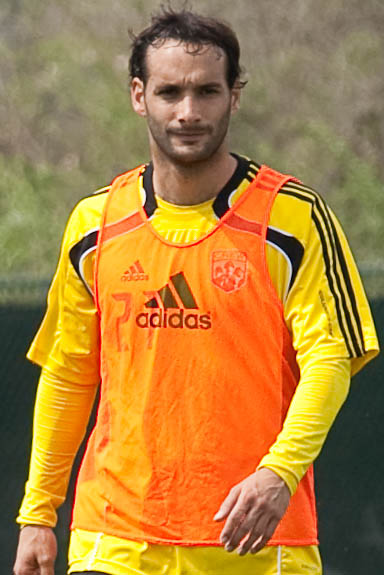
- Miranda in 2011

Personal information
- Full name: Sebastián Miguel Miranda Córdova
- Date of birth: 26 August 1980 (age 46)
- Place of birth: Las Condes, Santiago, Chile
- Height: 1.75 m (5 ft 9 in)
- Position: Defender

Team information
- Current team: Chile (youth) (manager)

Youth career
- 1996–1998: Unión Española

Senior career*
Years	Team	Apps	(Gls)
1999–2006	Unión Española	117	(5)
1999–2000	→ Ñublense (loan)		
2005–2006	→ RB Salzburg (loan)	4	(0)
2006–2007	Universidad Católica	38	(1)
2008–2010	Unión Española	88	(0)
2011–2012	Columbus Crew	68	(1)
2013	Everton	14	(1)
2013–2014	Unión Española	19	(0)

Managerial career
- 2015: Unión Española (youth)
- 2016–2017: Palestino (assistant)
- 2017–2018: Santiago Wanderers (assistant)
- 2018–2019: Universitario (assistant)
- 2019–2021: Chile U20 (assistant)
- 2021–2022: Universidad de Chile (youth)
- 2022: Universidad de Chile (interim)
- 2022: Universidad de Chile (interim)
- 2022: Universidad de Chile
- 2023: Universidad de Chile (youth)
- 2024–: Chile (youth)
- 2024–: Chile U23 (assistant)
- * Club domestic league appearances and goals

Sebastián Miguel Miranda Córdova (born 26 August 1980) is a Chilean football manager and former player who played as a defender. He currently works in the technical staff of the Chile national youth teams.

== Club career ==
=== Unión Española ===
Miranda began his professional career in 1996 after joining the Unión Española youth team. In 1998, he was called up to Unión Española's first team, who were then coached by Guillermo Yávar. The 1999 season marked the arrival of Juvenal Olmos as coach. He sent Miranda on loan to Ñublense, then of the Chilean Third Division, in order for him to gain first team experience. He remained there for two years until being recalled by Unión Española in preparation for their 2001 season in Primera Division. He made his first team debut for Unión Española in the 2001 season against Colo-Colo, and became a regular starter for Union for the next years. In 2004, he was named co-captain prior to the team's Apertura campaign.

During the 2005 Apertura, Miranda played a key role in guiding Unión Española to the 2005 Torneo Apertura. However, Miranda had already agreed a loan to Red Bull Salzburg of Austria for the rest of the 2005–2006 European season, preventing him in partaking in the 2005 Apertura play-offs, where Unión Española won their sixth national title in team history. Miranda made only 4 appearances for Salzburg before returning to Unión Española after the season's end. In 2006, he stayed with Unión Española throughout the 2006 Apertura before being sold to rivals Universidad Católica at the start of the 2006 Clausura.

=== Universidad Católica ===
After his transfer to UC, Miranda started in 11 games in defense during the Clausura, before injuring his ACL in his right knee, an injury that would keep him out for 9 months. He would go on to miss the 2006 Torneo Clasura where Universidad Católica would bow out during the playoffs and all of the 2007 Apertura and its Torneo where Universidad Católica lost to Colo-Colo in the final. He made his return during the 2007 Clausura where he made 11 appearances, 4 from the bench. Again, UC lost in the playoffs, after which, he left the club.

=== Return to Unión Española ===
In the off season, Miranda returned to Unión Española where he became a fixture in the back. After the retirement of José Luis Sierra before the 2009 Apertura he was named the new club captain. The team narrowly missed out on the title that season, losing to Universidad de Chile 3–2 on aggregate in the 2009 Torneo Apertura Finals. Because of their runners up finish, Unión Española qualified for the 2009 Copa Sudamericana, where they were eliminated by Vélez Sársfield in the Round of 16 by an aggregate score of 5–4. He continued to captain the side until the end of their 2010 Clausura.

=== Columbus Crew ===
On 24 December 2010, it was first reported by La Tercera on their website that Miranda had agreed to terms with American Major League Soccer side Columbus Crew. He made his Columbus debut on 22 February 2011, in leg 1 of the Crew's CONCACAF Champions League quarter-final series against Real Salt Lake. His first league game with the Crew was on 19 March 2011 against DC United in the season opener. He scored his first goal for the Crew against F.C. Dallas with a 20-yard header.

== Managerial career ==
Next his retirement, he worked as the manager of the academies of Unión Española at national level as well as the Football Technical Leader of the social club Estadio Español (Spanish Stadium). From February 2020 to September 2021, he was the assistant coach of Patricio Ormazábal of Chile U20 and next he joined Universidad de Chile youth system. In 2022, he took the challenge of coaching Universidad de Chile first team after Santiago Escobar was released.

Miranda was again named interim manager of U de Chile on 9 September 2022, after Diego López was dismissed. On 25 September, he was named manager until the end of the season.

On 7 November 2022, Miranda returned to La U's youth categories, as the club were looking for a new manager for the 2023 season.

In December 2023, he left Universidad de Chile and subsequently joined the technical staff of the Chile national youth teams under Nicolás Córdova, as well as an assistant in Chile U23.

== Honours ==
=== Player ===
Unión Española

- Primera División de Chile: 2005 Apertura
