= 2013 Columbus Crew season =

Columbus Crew
2013 season
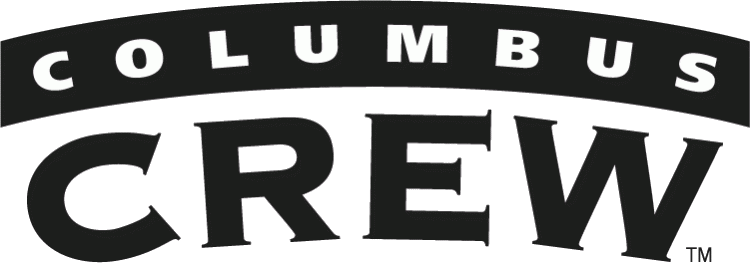
- Investor-operators: Clark Hunt (until July 30); Dan Hunt (until July 30); Lamar Hunt Jr. (until July 30); Sharron Hunt Munson (until July 30); Ron Pizzuti and a group of local investors (until July 30); Anthony Precourt (from July 30)
- Head Coach: Robert Warzycha (until September 3); Brian Bliss (interim) (from September 3)
- Stadium: Columbus Crew Stadium
- Major League Soccer: Conference: 8th Overall: 16th
- MLS Cup playoffs: Did not qualify
- U.S. Open Cup: Fourth round
- Top goalscorer: League: Dominic Oduro (13); All: Dominic Oduro (13)
- Highest home attendance: 20,392 (8/31 v. SEA)
- Lowest home attendance: 1,302 (5/29 v. DAY)
- Average home league attendance: 16,080 (79.8%)
- Biggest win: CHV 0–3 CLB (3/2); CLB 3–0 DC (4/27); CLB 3–0 CHI (9/21)
- Biggest defeat: RSL 4–0 CLB (8/24)
Home colors	Away colors

The 2013 Columbus Crew season was the club's 18th season of existence and their 18th consecutive season in Major League Soccer, the top flight of soccer in the United States and Canada. The first match of the season was on March 10 against Colorado Rapids. It was the fifth season under head coach Robert Warzycha who was fired on September 2. Brian Bliss took over as interim head coach through the rest of the season.

== Roster ==
As of August 31, 2013

Note: Flags indicate national team as defined under FIFA eligibility rules; some limited exceptions apply. Players may hold more than one non-FIFA nationality.

No.	Pos.	Nation	Player
2	DF	USA	Tyson Wahl
3	DF	USA	Josh Williams
4	DF	BRA	Gláuber (INT)
5	DF	USA	Danny O'Rourke
6	MF	CMR	Tony Tchani
7	MF	VEN	Bernardo Añor (INT; SUP)
8	MF	ARG	Matías Sánchez (INT)
9	FW	IRQ	Justin Meram
11	FW	GHA	Dominic Oduro
12	MF	USA	Eddie Gaven
13	MF	USA	Ethan Finlay
14	DF	USA	Chad Marshall
16	DF	USA	Eric Gehrig
17	FW	USA	Ben Speas (HGP)
18	FW	USA	Aaron Schoenfeld (SUP)

No.	Pos.	Nation	Player
19	MF	POL	Konrad Warzycha (SUP)
20	MF	USA	Wil Trapp (HGP)
21	DF	USA	Chad Barson (HGP; SUP)
22	DF	CAN	Drew Beckie (SUP)
23	MF	TTO	Kevan George (SUP)
24	DF	URU	Agustín Viana
25	FW	CRC	Jairo Arrieta (INT)
26	FW	USA	Ryan Finley
27	FW	USA	Aaron Horton (HGP)
28	GK	USA	Matt Lampson (HGP; SUP)
30	GK	USA	Andy Gruenebaum
31	DF	USA	Kyle Hyland (HGP; SUP)
32	MF	USA	Shawn Sloan (SUP)
33	FW	ARG	Federico Higuaín (Captain; INT; DP)
40	GK	USA	Daniel Withrow (SUP)

== Technical Staff ==
Position	Staff
President/General Manager	(United States) Mark McCullers
Technical Director	(United States) Brian Bliss
Head Coach	(Poland) Robert Warzycha until September 2 (United States) Brian Bliss after September 2
Assistant Coach	(Argentina) Ricardo Iribarren until September 2
Assistant Coach	(United States) Mike Lapper
Goalkeeper Coach	(United States) Scoop Stanisic until September 2
Strength/Fitness Coach	(United States) Brook Hamilton
Athletic Trainer	(United States) David Lagow
Assistant Trainer	(United States) Steve Purcell
Director of Team Operations	(United States) Tucker Walther
Team Operations Assistant	(United States) Ron Meadors
Equipment Manager	(United States) Rusty Wummel

Source: []

== Non-competitive ==
=== Preseason ===
The Crew started preseason in Columbus and played games in Florida and North Carolina before returning to Ohio. The Crew brought in the following trialists during training camp: Tony Halterman, Sean Teepen, Sercan Güvenışık, Krystian Witkowski, Hami Kara, Nate Bascom, Blake Brettschneider, Kyle Hyland, Konrad Warzycha, Samir Badr, Cody Calafiore and Jordan Gafa.

Unsigned draft picks Drew Beckie, Reed Matte, Daniel Withrow and Shawn Sloan also joined the team for preseason.

January 26 Friendly	Columbus Crew	1–0	D.C. United	Bradenton, FL
11:00 AM EST	Wahl (yellow card) 44'; Güvenışık 66' (pen.); Trapp (yellow card) 78'	Report	McDonald (yellow card) 24'	Stadium: IMG Academy

January 30 Friendly	Columbus Crew	2–1	Chicago Fire	Bradenton, FL
11:00 AM EST	Higuaín 21' (pen.); Güvenışık 61'	Report	Kitson (yellow card) 20'; Thompson (yellow card) 31'; Jumper (yellow card) 61'; Gallagher (yellow card) 73'; Atouba 89'	Stadium: IMG Academy

February 1 Friendly	Columbus Crew	0–2	New York Red Bulls	Bradenton, FL
11:00 AM EST	George (yellow card) 32'	Report	Cahill (yellow card) 24'; Izquierdo (yellow card) 45'; Christianson 80'; Cooper 87'	Stadium: IMG Academy

February 9 Walt Disney World Pro Soccer Classic Group Stage	Columbus Crew	1–0	Toronto FC	Lake Buena Vista, FL
1:00 PM EST	Viana (yellow card) 20'; Wahl (yellow card) 23'; Gláuber 30'; Finley (yellow card) 45'	Report		Stadium: ESPN Wide World of Sports Complex

February 13 Walt Disney World Pro Soccer Classic Group Stage	Columbus Crew	4–0	Philadelphia Union	Lake Buena Vista, FL
1:00 PM EST	Finley 28'; Finlay 40', 52'; Schoenfeld 53'	Report		Stadium: ESPN Wide World of Sports Complex

February 16 Friendly	Columbus Crew	5–2	Sporting Kansas City	Lake Buena Vista, FL
11:00 AM EST	Sloan 8'; O'Rourke (yellow card) 35'; Finlay 45+1'; Gehrig (yellow card) 52'; Meram 59'; Warzycha 64'; Speas 71'	Report	Dwyer 5'; Joseph (yellow card) 17'; Saad 68'

February 16 Walt Disney World Pro Soccer Classic Group Stage	Columbus Crew	3–2	Orlando City SC	Lake Buena Vista, FL
6:00 PM EST	Viana 4'; Higuaín (yellow card) 21', (goal) 89' (pen.); Arrieta (yellow card) 43'; Williams 74', (yellow card) 79'	Report	Watson (yellow card) 41', (goal) 57'; Diakhite (yellow card) 49'; O'Connor (yellow card) 59' (yellow-red card) 68'; Fekete 79'	Stadium: ESPN Wide World of Sports Complex

February 23 Walt Disney World Pro Soccer Classic Championship	Columbus Crew	0–1	Montreal Impact	Lake Buena Vista, FL
8:00 PM EST	Viana (yellow card) 26'; Gláuber (yellow card) 73'	Report	Pisanu (yellow card) 16'; Mapp 54'; Ferrari (yellow card) 90+'	Stadium: ESPN Wide World of Sports Complex

February 24 Kirk Urso Memorial Match	Columbus Crew	1–0	North Carolina Tar Heels	Browns Summit, NC
1:00 PM EST	Warzycha 79'	Report		Stadium: Macpherson Stadium; Attendance: 2,000

=== Midseason ===
Lucky Mkosana was a guest player against Michigan State Spartans.

April 7 Friendly	Columbus Crew	4–0	Michigan State Spartans	Columbus, OH
	Warzycha 5'; Finley 15'; Arrieta 33' (pen.); Sloan 80'	Report		Stadium: Columbus Crew Stadium

April 28 Friendly	Columbus Crew	4–0	West Virginia Mountaineers	Columbus, OH
	Finley; Finlay; Schoenfeld; Añor	Report		Stadium: Columbus Crew Stadium

July 14 Friendly	Columbus Crew	1–2	Wigan Athletic F.C.	Columbus, OH
7:30 PM EDT	Finley 73'	Report	McCarthy 46'; Fortuné 63'	Stadium: Columbus Crew Stadium

=== Postseason ===
Luckner Horat was a guest player again Indy Eleven.

November 2 Friendly	Indy Eleven	1–4	Columbus Crew	Westfield, IN
2:00 PM EDT	78'		Finlay 10'; Beckie 38'; Speas 58'; Finley 73'	Stadium: Westfield Soccer Park

November 8 Friendly	Columbus Crew	2–4	Indy Eleven	Obetz, OH
2:00 PM EST	Goal	Report	Goal	Stadium: Crew Training Center

== Competitive ==
=== Overview ===
Competition	First match	Last match	Starting round	Final position	Record							
Competition	First match	Last match	Starting round	Final position	Pld	W	D	L	GF	GA	GD	Win %
Major League Soccer	March 2, 2013	October 27, 2013	Matchday 1	16th	34	12	5	17	42	46	−4	35.29
U.S. Open Cup	May 29, 2013	June 13, 2013	Third Round	Fourth Round	2	1	0	1	3	3	+0	50.00
Total					36	13	5	18	45	49	−4	36.11

Source: Competitions

=== MLS ===
==== Standings ====
===== Eastern Conference =====
Pos	Team	Pld	W	L	T	GF	GA	GD	Pts
6	Chicago Fire	34	14	13	7	47	52	−5	49
7	Philadelphia Union	34	12	12	10	42	44	−2	46
8	Columbus Crew	34	12	17	5	42	46	−4	41
9	Toronto FC	34	6	17	11	30	47	−17	29
10	D.C. United	34	3	24	7	22	59	−37	16

Source: MLS

===== Overall table =====
Pos	Team	Pld	W	L	T	GF	GA	GD	Pts
14	Philadelphia Union	34	12	12	10	42	44	−2	46
15	FC Dallas	34	11	12	11	48	52	−4	44
16	Columbus Crew	34	12	17	5	42	46	−4	41
17	Toronto FC	34	6	17	11	30	47	−17	29
18	Chivas USA	34	6	20	8	30	67	−37	26

Source: MLS
Rules for classification: 1) points; 2) head-to-head record; 3) goal difference; 4) number of goals scored

==== Results summary ====
Overall								Home						Away					
Pld	Pts	W	L	T	GF	GA	GD	W	L	T	GF	GA	GD	W	L	T	GF	GA	GD
34	41	12	17	5	42	46	−4	7	7	3	19	13	+6	5	10	2	23	33	−10

Last updated: November 4, 2013
Source: Columbus Crew
Pld = Matches played; Pts = Points; W = Matches won; T = Matches tied; L = Matches lost; GF = Goals for; GA = Goals against; GD = Goal difference

==== Results by round ====
Round	1	2	3	4	5	6	7	8	9	10	11	12	13	14	15	16	17	18	19	20	21	22	23	24	25	26	27	28	29	30	31	32	33	34
Stadium	A	A	H	A	H	A	A	H	H	H	A	A	H	A	H	H	A	A	H	H	A	A	H	H	A	H	H	A	A	H	A	H	A	H
Result	W	L	T	W	T	T	L	W	L	L	W	T	T	L	W	L	L	L	W	L	L	L	W	W	L	L	W	L	W	W	W	L	L	L

Updated to match(es) played on November 4, 2013. Source: Columbus Crew
A = Away; H = Home; W = Win; L = Loss; T = Tie

==== Match results ====
March 2 1	Chivas USA	0–3	Columbus Crew	Carson, CA
10:30 PM EST	Morales (yellow card) 8'; Avila (yellow card) 29'; Bowen (yellow card) 76'; Iraheta (yellow card) 79'; Burling (yellow card) 90'	Report	Higuaín 51'; Williams 89'; Oduro 90+4'	Stadium: The Home Depot Center; Attendance: 7,121; Referee: Chris Penso; Assistant referees: Mike Kampmeinert; Jeff Muschik; Fourth official: Daniel Radford

March 9 2	Vancouver Whitecaps FC	2–1	Columbus Crew	Vancouver, BC
7:30 PM EST	Kobayashi 6'; Miller 57'	Report	Gláuber (yellow card) 19'; Arrieta 46', (yellow card) 88'; Sánchez (yellow card) 93'	Stadium: BC Place; Attendance: 18,078; Referee: Drew Fischer; Assistant referees: Kevin Duliba; Jeremy Hanson; Fourth official: Tyler Ploeger

March 16 3	Columbus Crew	1–1	San Jose Earthquakes	Columbus, OH
5:30 PM EDT	Gláuber 69'	Report	Morrow 74'; Bernárdez (yellow card) 88'	Stadium: Columbus Crew Stadium; Attendance: 16,528; Referee: Jorge Gonzalez; Assistant referees: Jeff Muschik; Matt Nelson; Fourth official: Sorin Stoica

March 23 4	D.C. United	1–2	Columbus Crew	Washington, D.C.
3:30 PM EDT	Rafael 22'; Kitchen (yellow card) 56'	Report	Williams 15'; Gaven (yellow card) 51'; Speas 56'	Stadium: Robert F. Kennedy Memorial Stadium; Attendance: 11,034; Referee: Allen Chapman; Assistant referees: Peter Manikowski; Craig Lowry; Fourth official: José Carlos Rivero

April 6 5	Columbus Crew	1–1	Philadelphia Union	Columbus, OH
5:00 PM EDT	Oduro 72'; Wahl (yellow card) 78'; Higuaín (yellow card) 86'; Sánchez (yellow card) 91'; Gláuber (yellow card) 93'	Report	McInerney 34'; Daniel (yellow card) 70'; Williams (yellow card) 84'	Stadium: Columbus Crew Stadium; Attendance: 10,293; Referee: Matthew Foerster; Assistant referees: Claudiu Badea; Mark Cahen; Fourth official: Hilario Grajeda

April 14 6	Montreal Impact	1–1	Columbus Crew	Montreal, QC
12:00 PM EDT	Arnaud (yellow card) 29'; Di Vaio 68'	Report	Williams (yellow card) 40'; Higuaín (yellow card) 59'; Oduro 72'	Stadium: Stade Saputo; Attendance: 16,584; Referee: Mark Geiger; Assistant referees: Joe Fletcher; Matt Nelson; Fourth official: José Carlos Rivero

April 20 7	Chicago Fire	1–0	Columbus Crew	Bridgeview, IL
8:30 PM EDT	Segares (yellow card) 6'; Thompson (yellow card) 13'; Larentowicz 83'; Paladini (yellow card) 88'	Report	Gláuber (yellow card) 85'	Stadium: Toyota Park; Attendance: 12,813; Referee: David Gantar; Assistant referees: Brian Poeschel; Jason Cullum; Fourth official: Daniel Radford

April 27 8	Columbus Crew	3–0	D.C. United	Columbus, OH
7:30 PM EDT	Oduro 15'; Viana (yellow card) 21'; Williams 26'; O'Rourke (yellow card) 45'; Higuaín 45+1' (pen.); Arrieta (yellow card) 70'; Gláuber (yellow card) 90+1'	Report	Kitchen (yellow card) 45'; Woolard (yellow card) 48'; Pajoy (yellow card) 74'	Stadium: Columbus Crew Stadium; Attendance: 14,090; Referee: Sorin Stoica; Assistant referees: Kermit Quisenberry; Matthew Kreitzer; Fourth official: Chris Penso

May 4 9	Columbus Crew	0–1	New York Red Bulls	Columbus, OH
4:00 PM EDT		Report	Miller (yellow card) 61'; Juninho (yellow card) 74'; Cahill 81', (yellow card) 81'	Stadium: Columbus Crew Stadium; Attendance: 12,020; Referee: Armando Villarreal; Assistant referees: Craig Lowry; Claudiu Badea; Fourth official: José Carlos Rivero

May 11 10	Columbus Crew	0–2	Colorado Rapids	Columbus, OH
7:30 PM EDT	Arrieta (yellow card) 18'; Gláuber (yellow card) 79'	Report	Buddle 9', (yellow card) 59'; Powers 70'; Rivero (yellow card) 75'	Stadium: Columbus Crew Stadium; Attendance: 11,269; Referee: Mark Geiger; Assistant referees: Daniel Belleau; James Conlee; Fourth official: Hilario Grajeda

May 18 11	Toronto FC	0–1	Columbus Crew	Toronto, ON
5:00 PM EDT	Laba (yellow card) 90+2'	Report	Oduro 42'; Wahl (yellow card) 60'; Gláuber (yellow card) 78'; Schoenfeld (yellow card) 87'	Stadium: BMO Field; Attendance: 18,278; Referee: José Rivero; Assistant referees: Chris Strickland; Marco Arruda; Fourth official: Hilario Grajeda

May 26 12	New York Red Bulls	2–2	Columbus Crew	Harrison, NJ
5:00 PM EDT	Henry 31'; Juninho (yellow card) 66'; Olave 90+1'	Report	Oduro 2'; Sánchez (yellow card) 41'; Higuaín 74' (pen.); George (yellow card) 76'	Stadium: Red Bull Arena; Attendance: 14,850; Referee: Geoff Gamble; Assistant referees: James Conlee; Eric Proctor; Fourth official: José Carlos Rivero

June 1 13	Columbus Crew	1–1	Houston Dynamo	Columbus, OH
7:30 PM EDT	Meram (yellow card) 67'; Higuaín 69' (pen.)	Report	Creavalle 32'; Camargo (yellow card) 55'; Driver (yellow card) 78'	Stadium: Columbus Crew Stadium; Attendance: 11,040; Referee: Sorin Stoica; Assistant referees: Jeff Muschik; Jeremy Hanson; Fourth official: Mark Kadlecik

June 5 14	Philadelphia Union	3–0	Columbus Crew	Chester, PA
7:30 PM EDT	Carroll 25'; Williams 29'; Casey 31'; Gaddis (yellow card) 59'	Report	Tchani (yellow card) 75'	Stadium: PPL Park; Attendance: 16,113; Referee: Silviu Petrescu; Assistant referees: Greg Barkey; Kevin Klinger; Fourth official: José Carlos Rivero

June 15 15	Columbus Crew	2–0	Montreal Impact	Columbus, OH
7:30 PM EDT	Sánchez 6', (yellow card) 56'; Oduro 22'; O'Rourke (yellow card) 82'; George (yellow card) 90'	Report	Felipe (yellow card) 9'	Stadium: Columbus Crew Stadium; Attendance: 18,320; Referee: Matthew Foerster; Assistant referees: Corey Parker; Jonathan Johnson; Fourth official: Ted Unkel

June 22 16	Columbus Crew	1–2	Chicago Fire	Columbus, OH
8:00 PM EDT	Higuaín 7' (pen.); Arrieta (yellow card) 45'; Sánchez (yellow card) 77'	Report	Johnson (yellow card) 6'; Lindpere (yellow card) 48'; Duka 52'; Magee 54'; Segares (yellow card) 60'; Soumaré (yellow card) 65'	Stadium: Columbus Crew Stadium; Attendance: 19,624; Referee: Drew Fischer; Assistant referees: Brian Poeschel; Brian Dunn; Fourth official: José Carlos Rivero

June 29 17	Sporting Kansas City	3–2	Columbus Crew	Kansas City, KS
8:30 PM EDT	Kamara 34', 80'; Bieler 50'; Collin (yellow card) 71'	Report	Arrieta 48'; Oduro 53'; Wahl (yellow card) 68'; George (yellow card) 70'	Stadium: Sporting Park; Attendance: 20,128; Referee: Juan Guzmán; Assistant referees: James Conlee; Chris Strickland; Fourth official: Edvin Jurisevic

July 4 18	Los Angeles Galaxy	2–1	Columbus Crew	Carson, CA
10:30 PM EDT	Keane 85' (pen.), 90+2' (pen.)	Report	Oduro (yellow card) 43'; Williams (yellow card) 66'; Añor 78', (yellow card) 90+2'	Stadium: StubHub Center; Attendance: 24,180; Referee: Sorin Stoica; Assistant referees: Craig Lowry; Mike Kampmeinert; Fourth official: Kevin Stott

July 7 19	Columbus Crew	1–0	Portland Timbers	Columbus, OH
5:00 PM EDT	Bernardo Añor 4'; Aaron Schoenfeld (yellow card) 23'; Warzycha (yellow card) 45+2'	Report	Kah (yellow card) 7', (red card) 11'; Johnson (yellow card) 51'; Zemanski (yellow card) 90+3'; Danso (yellow card) 90+5'	Stadium: Columbus Crew Stadium; Attendance: 15,051; Referee: Jorge Gonzalez; Assistant referees: Adam Wienckowski; Eric Proctor; Fourth official: Mark Kadlecik

July 20 20	Columbus Crew	0–2	New England Revolution	Columbus, OH
7:30 PM EDT	O'Rourke (yellow card) 45'; Añor (yellow card) 60'	Report	Soares (yellow card) 31'; Farrell (yellow card) 33'; Gonçalves 90+1'; Fagúndez 90+4'	Stadium: Columbus Crew Stadium; Attendance: 19,323; Referee: Edvin Jurisevic; Assistant referees: Bill Dittmar; Peter Balciunas; Fourth official: Daniel Fitzgerald

July 27 21	Toronto FC	2–1	Columbus Crew	Toronto, ON
2:00 PM EDT	Henry (yellow card) 68'; Eckersley (yellow card) 72'; Osorio 87', (yellow card) 88'; Wiedeman 90+3'	Report	Oduro 17'; Añor (yellow card) 64'	Stadium: BMO Field; Attendance: 17,987; Referee: Ismail Elfath; Assistant referees: Peter Manikowski; Jason Cullum; Fourth official: Robert Sibiga

August 3 22	Houston Dynamo	3–1	Columbus Crew	Houston, TX
9:00 PM EDT	Davis 10' (pen.); García (yellow card) 27'; Bruin 32'; Weaver 85'	Report	Taylor 75' (o.g.)	Stadium: BBVA Compass Stadium; Attendance: 20,009; Referee: Kevin Stott; Assistant referees: Brian Poeschel; Greg Barkey; Fourth official: Alejandro Mariscal

August 10 23	Columbus Crew	2–0	New York Red Bulls	Columbus, OH
7:30 PM EDT	Trapp (yellow card) 55'; Higuaín 61' (pen.), 77'; Oduro (yellow card) 80'	Report	Sekagya (yellow card) 88'	Stadium: Columbus Crew Stadium; Attendance: 19,080; Referee: Juan Guzmán; Assistant referees: Kevin Klinger; Adam Garner; Fourth official: Robert Sibiga

August 17 24	Columbus Crew	2–0	Toronto FC	Columbus, OH
7:30 PM EDT	Higuaín 19' 67'; Trapp (yellow card) 45'; O'Rourke (yellow card) 80'	Report	Eckersley (yellow card) 36'	Stadium: Columbus Crew Stadium; Attendance: 16,352; Referee: Ted Unkel; Assistant referees: Sean Hurd; Kermit Quisenberry; Fourth official: Chris Penso

August 24 25	Real Salt Lake	4–0	Columbus Crew	Sandy, UT
9:30 PM EDT	Sandoval (yellow card) 39', (goal) 51'; Beckerman 45+1', 89'; Gil 83'	Report	Higuain (yellow card) 34' (yellow-red card) 90+1'; Oduro (yellow card) 80'	Stadium: Rio Tinto Stadium; Attendance: 18,398; Referee: Silviu Petrescu; Assistant referees: James Conlee; Kevin Duliba; Fourth official: Edvin Jurisevic

August 31 26	Columbus Crew	0–1	Seattle Sounders FC	Columbus, OH
7:30 PM EDT	O'Rourke (yellow card) 21'; Viana (yellow card) 36'	Report	González (red card) 7'; Johnson 14'; Traoré (yellow card) 76'	Stadium: Columbus Crew Stadium; Attendance: 20,392; Referee: Ismail Elfath; Assistant referees: Chris Strickland; Brian Dunn; Fourth official: Hilario Grajeda

September 4 27	Columbus Crew	2–0	Houston Dynamo	Columbus, OH
7:30 PM EDT	Finley 14'; Meram 74'; Barson (yellow card) 77'	Report	Weaver (yellow card) 88'	Stadium: Columbus Crew Stadium; Attendance: 14,360; Referee: Jair Marrufo; Assistant referees: Frank Anderson; Fabio Tovar; Fourth official: Chris Penso

September 7 28	Sporting Kansas City	3–0	Columbus Crew	Kansas City, KS
8:30 PM EDT	Bieler 7' (pen.) (yellow card) 63'; Saad 41'; Nagamura (yellow card) 45+1'; Sapong 55'	Report	Tchani (yellow card) 52'; O'Rourke (yellow card) 62'	Stadium: Sporting Park; Attendance: 19,211; Referee: Jose Rivero; Assistant referees: George Gansner; Mark Cahen; Fourth official: Kevin Terry Jr.

September 14 29	Montreal Impact	1–2	Columbus Crew	Montreal, QC
2:00 PM EDT	Di Vaio 23'; Felipe (yellow card) 77'	Report	Tchani (yellow card) 63'; Marshall 65'; Oduro 78'	Stadium: Stade Saputo; Attendance: 20,210; Referee: Baldomero Toledo; Assistant referees: Philippe Brière; Matt Nelson; Fourth official: Fotis Bazakos

September 21 30	Columbus Crew	3–0	Chicago Fire	Columbus, OH
7:30 PM EDT	Oduro 15'; Marshall (yellow card) 38'; Higuaín 70' (pen.); Arrieta (yellow card) 75'; Añor 76'	Report	Soumaré (red card) 29'	Stadium: Columbus Crew Stadium; Attendance: 19,010; Referee: Juan Guzmán; Assistant referees: Baboucarr Jallow; Kevin Klinger; Fourth official: Daniel Fitzgerald

September 29 31	FC Dallas	2–4	Columbus Crew	Frisco, TX
8:30 PM EDT	Perez 20'; Diaz 54'; Acosta (yellow card) 75'; ferreira (yellow card) 84'	Report	Higuaín 9'; Arrieta 17'; Oduro 44'; Añor (yellow card) 67', (goal) 86'; Trapp (yellow card) 73'; Finlay (yellow card) 81'	Stadium: Toyota Stadium; Attendance: 11,422; Referee: Drew Fischer; Assistant referees: Bill Dittmar; Jason Cullum; Fourth official: Fotis Bazakos

October 5 32	Columbus Crew	0–1	Sporting Kansas City	Columbus, OH
7:30 PM EDT		Report	Opara 17'; Sapong (yellow card) 67'; Joseph (yellow card) 85'	Stadium: Columbus Crew Stadium; Attendance: 19,107; Referee: Jorge Gonzalez; Assistant referees: Brian Dunn; Scott Kachmarik; Fourth official: Kevin Terry Jr.

October 19 33	New England Revolution	3–2	Columbus Crew	Foxborough, MA
7:30 PM EDT	Soares 32'; Bengtson (yellow card) 47'; Tierney 69' (pen.); Fagundez 76'; Agudelo (yellow card) 90+4'; Imbongo (yellow card) 90+4'	Report	Finlay (yellow card) 31'; Oduro 59'; Schoenfeld 71'	Stadium: Gillette Stadium; Attendance: 26,548; Referee: Mark Geiger; Assistant referees: Sean Hurd; Joe Fletcher; Fourth official: Robert Sibiga

October 27 34	Columbus Crew	0–1	New England Revolution	Columbus, OH
4:00 PM EDT	Arrieta (yellow card) 25'; Viana (yellow card) 58'; Oduro (red card) 90'	Report	Agudelo 28', (yellow card) 89'; Reis (yellow card) 84'	Stadium: Columbus Crew Stadium; Attendance: 17,505; Referee: Hilario Grajeda; Assistant referees: Paul Scott; Bill Dittmar; Fourth official: Chris Penso

=== MLS Cup Playoffs ===
The Columbus Crew failed to qualify for the playoffs in this season.

=== U.S. Open Cup ===
May 29 Third Round	Columbus Crew (MLS) (Ohio)	2–1	(Ohio) Dayton Dutch Lions (USLP)	Columbus, OH
7:30 PM EDT	Gaven 52'; Gláuber (yellow card) 55'; Schoenfeld (yellow card) 76'; Meram 84'	Report	Granger (red card) 14'; Lord (yellow card) 37'; Smith 78'	Stadium: Columbus Crew Stadium; Attendance: 1,302; Referee: Sorin Stoica; Assistant referees: Michael Farmer; Pierre Saintil Francillon

June 13 Fourth Round	Chicago Fire (MLS) (Illinois)	2–1	(Ohio) Columbus Crew (MLS)	Bridgeview, IL
1:00 PM EDT	Magee 28', (yellow card) 70'; Nyarko 77', (yellow card) 82'; Soumaré (yellow card) 90'	Report	Warzycha 22', (yellow card) 70'; Añor (yellow card) 90'	Stadium: Toyota Park; Attendance: 2,006; Referee: Fotis Bazakos; Assistant referees: Anthony Vasoli; Kevin Klinger; Fourth official: Dimitar Chavdarov

== Reserve League ==
Pos	Club	GP	W	L	T	GF	GA	GD	Pts	PPG
1	Houston Dynamo Reserves (C)	9	5	4	0	12	16	−4	15	1.67
2	Columbus Crew Reserves	14	6	6	2	28	26	+2	20	1.43
3	New York Red Bulls Reserves	12	5	5	2	24	19	+5	17	1.42
4	Montreal Impact Reserves	11	4	4	3	16	13	+3	15	1.36
5	Toronto FC Reserves	8	3	4	1	15	12	+3	10	1.25
6	FC Dallas Reserves	13	5	7	1	21	26	−5	16	1.23
7	Chicago Fire Reserves	13	5	7	1	24	30	−6	16	1.23

=== Match Results ===
March 26 1	Columbus Crew	2–1	Chicago Fire	Obetz, OH
	Warzycha 45'; Añor 86'	Report	Jiménez (yellow card) 25'; Bone (yellow card) 52'; Rolfe 62'; Lelis (yellow card) 84' (yellow-red card) 94'	Stadium: Crew Training Center

March 31 2	New York Red Bulls	3–2	Columbus Crew	Montclair, NJ
	Obekop 19'; Añor 29' (o.g.); Sam (yellow card) 42'; Akpan 45'; Bustamante (yellow card) 59'; Sa (yellow card) 83'; Muyl (yellow card) 90'	Report	Warzycha 18'; Sánchez (yellow card) 71'; Sloan 90+2'	Stadium: MSU Soccer Park at Pittser Field

May 4 3	Columbus Crew	2–0	New York Red Bulls	Columbus, OH
	Finley 18'; Speas 50'	Report	Bustamante (yellow card) 25'	Stadium: Columbus Crew Stadium

May 18 4	Toronto FC	3–1	Columbus Crew	Toronto, ON
	Califf (yellow card) 36'; Osorio 43'; Brockie 44'; Bostock (yellow card) 57'; Sacramento 71'; Morgan (yellow card) 90'	Report	Añor 70'; Arrieta (yellow card) 95'	Stadium: BMO Field

June 2 5	Columbus Crew	0–1	Houston Dynamo	Columbus, OH
	George (yellow card) 15'; Finlay (yellow card) 43'	Report	Ownby 29'; Chabala (yellow card) 33'	Stadium: columbus Crew Stadium; Referee: Mark Kadlecik; Assistant referees: Peter Balciunas; Pierre Saintil Francillon; Fourth official: Andrey Castel

June 10 6	Columbus Crew	4–4	Dayton Dutch Lions	Beavercreek, OH
	Finley 6', (yellow card) 50', (goal) 61'; George (yellow card) 29'; Warzycha 37'; Añor 68', (yellow card) 82'	Report	Bardsley 15'; DeLass 26' (pen.), 45' (pen.), (yellow card) 64'; Garner (yellow card) 56'; Harada (yellow card) 62'; Smith 89'	Stadium: Miami Valley Hospital Stadium; Attendance: 1,621

June 16 7	Columbus Crew	0–1	Montreal Impact	Obetz, OH
	Tchani (yellow card) 26'	Report	Meftouh (yellow card) 9'; Ilcu 87'	Stadium: Crew Training Center; Referee: Ted Unkel; Assistant referees: Joseph Kuzma; Tori Penso; Fourth official: Michael Farmer

July 11 8	Columbus Crew	3–1	Dayton Dutch Lions	Columbus, OH
	Sánchez (yellow card) 58'; Speas 68' (pen.); Wahl 76'; Tchani 81'; Schoenfeld (yellow card) 86'	Report	Westdijk 42', (yellow card) 48'	Stadium: Crew Stadium; Referee: Andrey Castel; Assistant referees: James Dussendorf; Joe Kuzma; Fourth official: Tre Gaither

July 17 9	Chicago Fire	5–3	Columbus Crew	Bridgeview, IL
	Mac-Donald 21'; Amarikwa 36'; Paladini (yellow card) 50'; Santos 60' (pen.); King 74'; Wahl 83' (o.g.); Jumper (yellow card) 83'	Report	Finley 36', 87' (pen.); Viana (yellow card) 38'; Sloan (yellow card) 63'; Finlay (yellow card) 75', (goal) 89'	Stadium: Toyota Park; Referee: Nikola Aleksic; Assistant referees: Jordan Pramulc; Art Arustamyan; Fourth official: Prem Kumar

August 4 10	Houston Dynamo	0–2	Columbus Crew	Houston, TX
	Chabala (yellow card) 43'	Report	Mohamed 60', (yellow card) 63'; Blackwell (yellow card) 69'; Beckie 82'	Stadium: Houston Sports Park

August 27 11	Columbus Crew	3–1	FC Dallas	Obetz, OH
	Finley 6', 54', 69'; Tchani (yellow card) 65'; Finlay (yellow card) 67'	Report	Garcia (yellow card) 62'; Cooper 77'	Stadium: Crew Training Center

September 14 12	Montreal Impact	3–0	Columbus Crew	Montreal, QC
	Pisanu 20'; Wenger 22'; Smith 48'	Report	Hyland (yellow card) 69' (yellow-red card) 84'; Job (yellow card) 86'	Stadium: Stade Saputo

September 22 13	Columbus Crew	3–3	Chicago Fire	Obetz, OH
	Finley 27'; Meram 44'; Sánchez (yellow card) 59'; Speas 67'	Report	Nyarko (yellow card) 24'; Paladini 42' (pen.), 45+', 74' (pen.); Atouba (yellow card) 81'	Stadium: Crew Training Center; Referee: Daniel Fitzgerald; Assistant referees: Joe Kuzma; Michael Farmer; Fourth official: Michael Guthrie

September 30 14	FC Dallas	1–3	Columbus Crew	Frisco, TX
	Garcia 27'	Report	Finley 49', 70'; Horton 85'	Stadium: Toyota Stadium; Referee: Chris Mercado; Assistant referees: William Tomlinson; Tom Hartlett; Fourth official: Elie Aguilar

== Statistics ==
=== Appearances and goals ===
Under "Apps" for each section, the first number represents the number of starts, and the second number represents appearances as a substitute.

No.	Pos	Nat	Player	Total		MLS		U.S. Open Cup	
No.	Pos	Nat	Player	Apps	Goals	Apps	Goals	Apps	Goals
2	DF	(United States) USA	Tyson Wahl	27	0	24+1	0	2+0	0
3	DF	(United States) USA	Josh Williams	27	3	25+2	3	0+0	0
4	DF	(Brazil) BRA	Gláuber	15	1	13+0	1	2+0	0
5	DF	(United States) USA	Danny O'Rourke	23	0	19+3	0	1+0	0
6	MF	(Cameroon) CMR	Tony Tchani	23	0	13+9	0	1+0	0
7	MF	(Venezuela) VEN	Bernardo Añor	21	4	19+1	4	1+0	0
8	MF	(Argentina) ARG	Matías Sánchez	14	1	10+4	1	0+0	0
9	FW	(Iraq) IRQ	Justin Meram	21	2	9+10	1	1+1	1
11	FW	(Ghana) GHA	Dominic Oduro	35	13	34+0	13	0+1	0
12	MF	(United States) USA	Eddie Gaven	11	1	10+0	0	1+0	1
13	MF	(United States) USA	Ethan Finlay	21	0	3+16	0	1+1	0
14	DF	(United States) USA	Chad Marshall	30	1	30+0	1	0+0	0
16	DF	(United States) USA	Eric Gehrig	8	0	6+0	0	2+0	0
17	FW	(United States) USA	Ben Speas	21	1	10+9	1	2+0	0
18	FW	(United States) USA	Aaron Schoenfeld	12	1	3+7	1	1+1	0
19	MF	(Poland) POL	Konrad Warzycha	15	1	2+11	0	2+0	1
20	MF	(United States) USA	Wil Trapp	16	0	16+0	0	0+0	0
21	DF	(United States) USA	Chad Barson	21	0	18+2	0	1+0	0
22	DF	(Canada) CAN	Drew Beckie	0	0	0+0	0	0+0	0
23	MF	(Trinidad and Tobago) TTO	Kevan George	13	0	3+8	0	1+1	0
24	DF	(Uruguay) URU	Agustín Viana	20	0	20+0	0	0+0	0
25	FW	(Costa Rica) CRC	Jairo Arrieta	26	3	21+5	3	0+0	0
26	FW	(United States) USA	Ryan Finley	14	1	3+11	1	0+0	0
27	FW	(United States) USA	Aaron Horton	0	0	0+0	0	0+0	0
28	GK	(United States) USA	Matt Lampson	14	0	13+0	0	1+0	0
30	GK	(United States) USA	Andy Gruenebaum	22	0	21+0	0	1+0	0
31	DF	(United States) USA	Kyle Hyland	0	0	0+0	0	0+0	0
32	MF	(United States) USA	Shawn Sloan	0	0	0+0	0	0+0	0
33	FW	(Argentina) ARG	Federico Higuaín	31	11	29+0	11	1+1	0
40	GK	(United States) USA	Daniel Withrow	0	0	0+0	0	0+0	0
			Own goal	0	1	-	1	-	0
Players who left Columbus during the season:
41	GK	(United States) USA	Brad Stuver	0	0	0+0	0	0+0	0

=== Disciplinary record ===
No.	Pos.	Name	MLS		U.S. Open Cup		Total	
No.	Pos.	Name	Yellow card	Red card	Yellow card	Red card	Yellow card	Red card
2	DF	(United States) Tyson Wahl	4	0	0	0	4	0
3	DF	(United States) Josh Williams	2	0	0	0	2	0
4	DF	(Brazil) Gláuber	5	0	1	0	6	0
5	DF	(United States) Danny O'Rourke	6	0	0	0	6	0
6	MF	(Cameroon) Tony Tchani	3	0	0	0	3	0
7	MF	(Venezuela) Bernardo Añor	4	0	1	0	5	0
8	MF	(Argentina) Matías Sánchez	5	0	0	0	5	0
9	FW	(Iraq) Justin Meram	1	0	0	0	1	0
11	FW	(Ghana) Dominic Oduro	3	1	0	0	3	1
12	MF	(United States) Eddie Gaven	1	0	0	0	1	0
13	MF	(United States) Ethan Finlay	2	0	0	0	2	0
14	DF	(United States) Chad Marshall	2	0	0	0	2	0
16	DF	(United States) Eric Gehrig	0	0	0	0	0	0
17	FW	(United States) Ben Speas	0	0	0	0	0	0
18	FW	(United States) Aaron Schoenfeld	2	0	1	0	3	0
19	MF	(Poland) Konrad Warzycha	1	0	1	0	2	0
20	MF	(United States) Wil Trapp	3	0	0	0	3	0
21	DF	(United States) Chad Barson	0	0	0	0	0	0
22	DF	(Canada) Drew Beckie	0	0	0	0	0	0
23	MF	(Trinidad and Tobago) Kevan George	3	0	0	0	3	0
24	DF	(Uruguay) Agustín Viana	4	0	0	0	4	0
25	FW	(Costa Rica) Jairo Arrieta	6	0	0	0	6	0
26	FW	(United States) Ryan Finley	0	0	0	0	0	0
27	FW	(United States) Aaron Horton	0	0	0	0	0	0
28	GK	(Argentina) Matt Lampson	0	0	0	0	0	0
30	GK	(United States) Andy Gruenebaum	0	0	0	0	0	0
31	DF	(United States) Kyle Hyland	0	0	0	0	0	0
32	MF	(United States) Shawn Sloan	0	0	0	0	0	0
33	FW	(Argentina) Federico Higuaín	5	1	0	0	5	1
40	GK	(United States) Daniel Withrow	0	0	0	0	0	0
Players who left Columbus during the season:
41	GK	(United States) Brad Stuver	0	0	0	0	0	0

=== Clean sheets ===
No.	Name	MLS	U.S. Open Cup	Total	Games Played		
No.	Name	28	(United States) Matt Lampson	5	0	0	14
30	(United States) Andy Gruenebaum	4	0	0	22		
40	(United States) Daniel Withrow	0	0	0	0		
Players who left Columbus during the season:
41	(United States) Brad Stuver	0	0	0	0		

== Reserve League Statistics ==
=== Appearances and goals ===
Under "Apps" for each section, the first number represents the number of starts, and the second number represents appearances as a substitute.

No.	Pos	Nat	Player	Total		MLS Reserve League	
No.	Pos	Nat	Player	Apps	Goals	Apps	Goals
7	MF	(Venezuela) VEN	Bernardo Añor	6	3	4+2	3
25	FW	(Costa Rica) CRC	Jairo Arrieta	1	0	1+0	0
-	FW	(United States) USA	Jacob Atkinson	1	0	1+0	0
21	DF	(United States) USA	Chad Barson	5	0	5+0	0
-	MF	(United States) USA	William Bayemi	2	0	0+2	0
-	FW	(United States) USA	Aidan Bean	0	0	0+0	0
22	DF	(Canada) CAN	Drew Beckie	10	1	9+1	1
-	MF	(United States) USA	Brady Blackwell	6	0	0+6	0
-	DF	(United States) USA	Alex Bumpus	1	0	0+1	0
-	MF	(United States) USA	Matt Dudon	1	0	0+1	0
13	MF	(United States) USA	Ethan Finlay	13	1	13+0	1
26	FW	(United States) USA	Ryan Finley	13	11	12+1	11
16	DF	(United States) USA	Eric Gehrig	8	0	8+0	0
23	MF	(Trinidad and Tobago) TTO	Kevan George	14	0	14+0	0
-	MF	(United States) USA	Matt Gold	2	0	0+2	0
30	GK	(United States) USA	Andy Gruenebaum	2	0	2+0	0
27	FW	(United States) USA	Aaron Horton	4	1	0+4	1
-	FW	(United States) USA	Noah Hutchins	3	0	0+3	0
31	DF	(United States) USA	Kyle Hyland	11	0	9+2	0
-	MF	(Canada) CAN	Lilango Job	1	0	0+1	0
-	DF	(United States) USA	Tyler Kidwell	2	0	1+1	0
28	GK	(United States) USA	Matt Lampson	9	0	9+0	0
-	GK	(United States) USA	Justin Luthy	0	0	0+0	0
-	FW	(United States) USA	Andrew McKelvey	3	0	0+3	0
9	FW	(Iraq) IRQ	Justin Meram	9	1	9+0	1
-	MF	(Somalia) SOM	Omar Mohamed	4	1	4+0	1
5	DF	(United States) USA	Danny O'Rourke	1	0	1+0	0
-	DF	(United States) USA	Charlie Reymann	1	0	0+1	0
8	MF	(Argentina) ARG	Matías Sánchez	6	0	6+0	0
18	FW	(United States) USA	Aaron Schoenfeld	10	0	6+4	0
-	FW	(United States) USA	John Schuman	1	0	1+0	0
32	MF	(United States) USA	Shawn Sloan	10	1	5+5	1
17	FW	(United States) USA	Ben Speas	9	3	8+1	3
41	GK	(United States) USA	Brad Stuver	3	0	0+3	0
-	MF	(United States) USA	Ben Swanson	0	0	0+0	0
6	MF	(Cameroon) CMR	Tony Tchani	6	1	6+0	1
20	MF	(United States) USA	Wil Trapp	5	0	2+3	0
24	DF	(Uruguay) URU	Agustín Viana	3	0	3+0	0
2	DF	(United States) USA	Tyson Wahl	4	1	4+0	1
19	MF	(Poland) POL	Konrad Warzycha	12	3	10+2	3
-	MF	(Netherlands) NED	Vincent Weijl	2	0	1+1	0
3	DF	(United States) USA	Josh Williams	1	0	1+0	0
40	GK	(United States) USA	Daniel Withrow	3	0	3+0	0
			Own goal	0	0	-	0

=== Disciplinary record ===
No.	Pos.	Name	MLS Reserve League		Total	
No.	Pos.	Name	Yellow card	Red card	Yellow card	Red card
7	MF	(Venezuela) Bernardo Añor	1	0	1	0
25	FW	(Costa Rica) Jairo Arrieta	1	0	1	0
–	FW	(United States) Jacob Atkinson	0	0	0	0
21	DF	(United States) Chad Barson	0	0	0	0
–	MF	(United States) William Bayemi	0	0	0	0
–	FW	(United States) Aidan Bean	0	0	0	0
22	DF	(Canada) Drew Beckie	0	0	0	0
–	MF	(United States) Brady Blackwell	1	0	1	0
–	DF	(United States) Alex Bumpus	0	0	0	0
–	MF	(United States) Matt Dudon	0	0	0	0
13	FW	(United States) Ethan Finlay	3	0	3	0
26	FW	(United States) Ryan Finley	1	0	1	0
16	DF	(United States) Eric Gehrig	0	0	0	0
23	MF	(Trinidad and Tobago) Kevan George	2	0	2	0
–	MF	(United States) Matt Gold	0	0	0	0
30	GK	(United States) Andy Gruenebaum	0	0	0	0
27	FW	(United States) Aaron Horton	0	0	0	0
–	FW	(United States) Noah Hutchins	0	0	0	0
31	DF	(United States) Kyle Hyland	2	1	2	1
–	MF	(Canada) Lilango Job	0	0	0	0
–	DF	(United States) Tyler Kidwell	0	0	0	0
28	GK	(Argentina) Matt Lampson	0	0	0	0
–	GK	(United States) Justin Luthy	0	0	0	0
–	FW	(United States) Andrew McKelvey	0	0	0	0
9	FW	(Iraq) Justin Meram	0	0	0	0
–	MF	(Somalia) Omar Mohamed	1	0	1	0
5	DF	(United States) Danny O'Rourke	0	0	0	0
–	DF	(United States) Charlie Reymann	0	0	0	0
8	MF	(Argentina) Matías Sánchez	3	0	3	0
18	FW	(United States) Aaron Schoenfeld	1	0	1	0
–	FW	(United States) John Schuman	0	0	0	0
32	MF	(United States) Shawn Sloan	1	0	1	0
17	FW	(United States) Ben Speas	0	0	0	0
41	GK	(United States) Brad Stuver	0	0	0	0
–	MF	(United States) Ben Swanson	0	0	0	0
6	MF	(Cameroon) Tony Tchani	2	0	2	0
20	MF	(United States) Wil Trapp	0	0	0	0
24	DF	(Uruguay) Agustín Viana	1	0	1	0
2	DF	(United States) Tyson Wahl	0	0	0	0
19	MF	(Poland) Konrad Warzycha	0	0	0	0
–	MF	(Netherlands) Vincent Weijl	0	0	0	0
3	DF	(United States) Josh Williams	0	0	0	0
40	GK	(United States) Daniel Withrow	0	0	0	0

=== Clean sheets ===
No.	Name	MLS Reserve League	Total	Games Played		
No.	Name	30	(United States) Andy Gruenebaum	0	0	2
28	(United States) Matt Lampson	1	1	9		
–	(United States) Justin Luthy	0	0	0		
41	(United States) Brad Stuver	0.5	0.5	3		
40	(United States) Daniel Withrow	0.5	0.5	3		

== Transfers ==
=== In ===
Pos.	Player	Transferred from	Fee/notes	Date	Source
DF	(United States) Tyson Wahl	(United States) Colorado Rapids	Free transfer	January 3, 2013	
DF	(United States) Chad Barson	(United States) Akron Zips	Signed to a homegrown contract	January 10, 2013	
DF	(United States) Ryan Finley	(United States) Notre Dame Fighting Irish	Drafted in round 1 of the 2013 MLS SuperDraft	January 17, 2013	
DF	(Brazil) Gláuber	(Austria) FC Rapid București	Signed via discovery	January 21, 2013	
DF	(Uruguay) Agustín Viana	(Uruguay) C.A. Bella Vista	Signed via discovery	January 28, 2013	
FW	(Ghana) Dominic Oduro	(United States) Chicago Fire	Traded for Dilly Duka and the right of first refusal for Robbie Rogers	February 4, 2013	
MF	(Argentina) Matías Sánchez	(Argentina) Estudiantes de La Plata	Signed via discovery	February 8, 2013	
DF	(Canada) Drew Beckie	(United States) Denver Pioneers	Drafted in round 2 of the 2013 MLS SuperDraft	February 15, 2013	
MF	(Poland) Konrad Warzycha	(United States) Sporting Kansas City	Free transfer	February 27, 2013	
MF	(United States) Shawn Sloan	(United States) High Point Panthers	Drafted in round 4 of the 2013 MLS Supplemental Draft	February 27, 2013	
DF	(United States) Kyle Hyland	(United States) IUPUI Jaguars	Signed to a homegrown contract	February 27, 2013	
GK	(United States) Daniel Withrow	(United States) Marshall Thundering Herd	Drafted in round 2 of the 2013 MLS Supplemental Draft	March 7, 2013	
GK	(United States) Brad Stuver	(United States) MLS Pool	Selected in the 2013 MLS Waiver Draft	November 25, 2013	
DF	(Costa Rica) Waylon Francis	(Costa Rica) C.S. Herediano	Signed via discovery	November 26, 2013	
DF	(United States) Matt Wiet	(United States) Dayton Dutch Lions	Signed to a homegrown contract	November 26, 2013	
DF	(United States) Josh Williams	(United States) Columbus Crew		November 26, 2013	
FW	(Ghana) Dominic Oduro	(United States) Columbus Crew		December 9, 2013	
MF	(United States) Daniel Paladini	(United States) Chicago Fire	Traded for a fourth round draft pick in the 2014 MLS SuperDraft	December 12, 2013	
GK	(United States) Steve Clark	(Norway) Hønefoss BK	Traded Seattle Sounders FC a fourth round draft pick in the 2015 MLS SuperDraft for his rights	December 16, 2013	
FW	(Costa Rica) Jairo Arrieta	(United States) Columbus Crew		December 19, 2013	

=== Loans in ===
Pos.	Player	Parent club	Length/Notes	Beginning	End	Source
GK	(United States) Brad Stuver	(United States) MLS Pool		September 21, 2013	September 22, 2013	

=== Out ===
Pos.	Player	Transferred to	Fee/notes	Date	Source
MF	(Chile) Milovan Mirošević	(Chile) Universidad Católica	Mutual Release of Contract	January 20, 2013	
MF	(United States) Dilly Duka	(United States) Chicago Fire	Traded with the right of first refusal for Robbie Rogers and Dominic Oduro	February 4, 2013	
MF	(Argentina) Matías Sánchez	(Argentina) Arsenal de Sarandí	Option declined	October 31, 2013	
DF	(United States) Aaron Horton	Retired	Option declined	October 31, 2013	
MF	(United States) Eddie Gaven	Retired	Option declined	October 31, 2013	
DF	(Canada) Drew Beckie	(Canada) Ottawa Fury	Option declined	November 22, 2013	
DF	(Brazil) Gláuber	Retired	Option declined	November 22, 2013	
DF	(United States) Kyle Hyland	(United States) Indy Eleven	Option declined	November 22, 2013	
DF	(United States) Danny O’Rourke	(United States) Ottawa Fury	Option declined	November 22, 2013	
MF	(Poland) Konrad Warzycha	Retired	Option declined	November 22, 2013	
FW	(Costa Rica) Jairo Arrieta	(United States) Columbus Crew	Option declined	November 22, 2013	
GK	(United States) Andy Gruenebaum	(United States) Sporting Kansas City	Contract expired	November 22, 2013	
FW	(Ghana) Dominic Oduro	(United States) Columbus Crew	Contract expired	November 22, 2013	
DF	(United States) Josh Williams	(United States) Columbus Crew	Contract expired	November 22, 2013	
DF	(United States) Chad Marshall	(United States) Seattle Sounders FC	Traded for a third round draft pick in the 2015 MLS SuperDraft and allocation money	December 12, 2013	

=== Loans out ===
Pos.	Player	Loanee club	Length/Notes	Beginning	End	Source
FW	(United States) Aaron Horton	(United States) Los Angeles Blues		May 29, 2013	September 8, 2013	

=== MLS Draft picks ===
Draft picks are not automatically signed to the team roster. Only those who are signed to a contract will be listed as transfers in. The picks for the Columbus Crew are listed below:

2013 Columbus Crew SuperDraft Picks
Round	Pick	Player	Position	College
1	9	(United States) Ryan Finley	FW	Notre Dame
2	28	(Canada) Drew Beckie	DF	Denver

2013 Columbus Crew Supplemental Draft Picks
Round	Pick	Player	Position	College
1	9	(United States) Reed Matte	DF	UAB
2	28	(United States) Daniel Withrow	GK	Marshall
4	66	(United States) Shawn Sloan	MF	High Point

2013 Columbus Crew Waiver Draft Picks
Round	Pick	Player	Position	Team
1	4	(United States) Brad Stuver	GK	MLS Pool

== Awards ==
MLS Team of the Week
Week	Starters	Bench	Opponent(s)	Link
1		(Brazil) Gláuber (United States) Andy Gruenebaum (Argentina) Federico Higuaín (United States) Josh Williams	(United States) Chivas USA	
2		(Argentina) Federico Higuaín	(Canada) Vancouver Whitecaps FC	
3		(Brazil) Gláuber	(United States) San Jose Earthquakes	
4		(United States) Andy Gruenebaum (United States) Ben Speas (United States) Josh Williams	(United States) D.C. United	
6		(United States) Ben Speas (Ghana) Dominic Oduro	(United States) Philadelphia Union	
7		(Ghana) Dominic Oduro	(Canada) Montreal Impact	
8		(United States) Andy Gruenebaum	(United States) Chicago Fire	
9	(United States) Danny O'Rourke (Costa Rica) Jairo Arrieta		(United States) D.C. United	
10	(United States) Josh Williams		(United States) New York Red Bulls	
12	(Argentina) Federico Higuaín		(Canada) Toronto FC	
13		(United States) Eric Gehrig	(United States) New York Red Bulls	
14		(Argentina) Federico Higuaín	(United States) Houston Dynamo	
16	(Argentina) Matías Sánchez (Ghana) Dominic Oduro (Poland) Robert Warzycha (coach)	(United States) Chad Barson	(Canada) Montreal Impact	
19	(United States) Danny O'Rourke (Venezuela) Bernardo Añor		(United States) Los Angeles Galaxy (United States) Portland Timbers	
24	(United States) Chad Marshall (Argentina) Federico Higuaín		(United States) New York Red Bulls	
25	(Argentina) Federico Higuaín		(Canada) Toronto FC	
28		(Iraq) Justin Meram	(United States) Houston Dynamo (United States) Sporting Kansas City	
29	(United States) Matt Lampson (Argentina) Federico Higuaín		(Canada) Montreal Impact	
30	(Cameroon) Tony Tchani		(United States) Chicago Fire	
31	(United States) Chad Marshall (Ghana) Dominic Oduro (Argentina) Federico Higuaín (United States) Brian Bliss		(United States) FC Dallas	
34		(Ghana) Dominic Oduro	(United States) New England Revolution	

=== MLS Player of the Week ===
Week	Player	Opponent	Link
31	(Ghana) Dominic Oduro	FC Dallas	

=== MLS Goal of the Week ===
Week	Player	Opponent	Link
24	(Argentina) Federico Higuaín	New York Red Bulls	

=== MLS Player of the Month ===
Month	Player	Stats	Link
September	(Ghana) Dominic Oduro	3 goals, 2 assists	

=== MLS WORKS Humanitarian of the Month ===
Month	Player	Link
September	(United States) Matt Lampson	

=== Crew Team Awards ===
- Most Valuable Player – Federico Higuaín
- Golden Boot – Dominic Oduro
- Comeback Player of the Year – Bernardo Añor
- Defender of the Year – Chad Marshall
- Goal of the Year – Ben Speas
- Kirk Urso Heart Award – Eric Gehrig
- Breakout Performance of the Year – Wil Trapp
- Humanitarian of the Year – Matt Lampson
- Academy U15/U16 Player of the Year – Mike McCloseky
- Academy U17/U18 Player of the Year – Tyler Kidwell
- Academy U19/U20 Player of the Year – Connor Klekota
- Jim Nelson Fan of the Year – Tom Chiatalas
