= 2013 Walt Disney World Pro Soccer Classic =

Tournament details
- Host country: United States
- Dates: February 9–23
- Teams: 8
- Venue: 1 (in 1 host city)

Final positions
- Champions: Montreal Impact (1st title)
- Runners-up: Columbus Crew

Tournament statistics
- Matches played: 16
- Goals scored: 41 (2.56 per match)
- Top scorer(s): (Italy) Marco Di Vaio (Colombia) Lionard Pajoy (3 goals each)

The 2013 Walt Disney World Pro Soccer Classic was the fourth edition of the Walt Disney World Pro Soccer Classic, a pre-season exhibition tournament held at the ESPN Wide World of Sports Complex at the Walt Disney World in Bay Lake, Florida. A total of six Major League Soccer teams participated.

The defending champions were the Vancouver Whitecaps FC, but the club did not participate. The Houston Dynamo and FC Dallas did not compete for the first time since the competition's inception in 2010. Toronto FC was the last original team to remain.

The tournament was won by the Montreal Impact, who defeated the Columbus Crew 1–0 in the final.

== Teams ==
The following clubs competed in the tournament.

Team	Location	Professional league	Appearance	Notes	Ref.
Columbus Crew	Columbus, Ohio	Major League Soccer	1st		
D.C. United	Washington, D.C.	Major League Soccer	1st	2012 MLS Eastern Conference runners-up	
Montreal Impact	Montreal, Quebec	Major League Soccer	2nd		
Orlando City	Orlando, Florida	USL Pro	3rd	2012 USL Pro Commissioner's Cup winners	
Philadelphia Union	Philadelphia, Pennsylvania	Major League Soccer	1st		
Sporting Kansas City	Kansas City, Kansas	Major League Soccer	2nd	2012 US Open Cup champions	
Tampa Bay Rowdies	St. Petersburg, Florida	North American Soccer League	1st	2012 NASL champions	
Toronto FC	Toronto, Ontario	Major League Soccer	4th	2012 Canadian Championship champions	

== Matches ==
On December 14, 2012, the schedule was released.

Key to colours in group tables
Group winners advance to Final

=== Group stage ===
==== Group A ====
Team	Pld	W	L	D	GF	GA	GD	Pts
Columbus Crew	3	3	0	0	8	2	+6	9
Philadelphia Union	3	1	1	1	4	5	−1	4
Toronto FC	3	1	2	0	3	4	−1	3
Orlando City	3	0	2	1	3	7	−4	1

February 9
13:00 UTC-5

Columbus Crew	1–0	Toronto FC
Gláuber 30'	Recap

ESPN Wide World of Sports Complex, Bay Lake, Florida, USA
February 9
18:00 UTC-5

Orlando City	1–1	Philadelphia Union
Chin 53'	Recap	Fernandes 71'

ESPN Wide World of Sports Complex, Bay Lake, Florida, USA

February 13
13:00 UTC-5

Columbus Crew	4–0	Philadelphia Union
Finley 28'; Finlay 40', 52'; Schoenfeld 53'	Recap

ESPN Wide World of Sports Complex, Bay Lake, Florida, USA
February 13
20:00 UTC-5

Toronto FC	3–0	Orlando City
T. Morgan 8'; Dunfield 72' (pen.); Osorio 90+3'	Lake-disney Recap

ESPN Wide World of Sports Complex, Bay Lake, Florida, USA

February 16
15:00 UTC-5

Philadelphia Union	3–0	Toronto FC
Hoppenot 8'; Torres 40'; Kassel 51'	Recap

ESPN Wide World of Sports Complex, Bay Lake, Florida, USA
February 16
18:00 UTC-5

Orlando City	2–3	Columbus Crew
Watson 57'; Fekete 79'	Lake-city-2 Recap	Viana 4'; Williams 74'; Higuaín 89' (pen.)

ESPN Wide World of Sports Complex, Bay Lake, Florida, USA

==== Group B ====
Team	Pld	W	L	D	GF	GA	GD	Pts
Montreal Impact	3	2	0	1	7	3	+4	7
Sporting Kansas City	3	2	1	0	4	2	+2	6
D.C. United	3	1	1	1	5	3	+2	4
Tampa Bay Rowdies	3	0	3	0	1	9	−8	0

February 9
15:00 UTC-5

Montreal Impact	2–1	Sporting Kansas City
Di Vaio 45'; Wenger 61'	Recap	Zusi 18'

ESPN Wide World of Sports Complex, Bay Lake, Florida, USA
February 9
20:00 UTC-5

D.C. United	4–0	Tampa Bay Rowdies
Pajoy 55', 59'; Kemp 66', 73'	Recap

ESPN Wide World of Sports Complex, Bay Lake, Florida, USA

February 13
15:00 UTC-5

Tampa Bay Rowdies	1–4	Montreal Impact
Yamada 38' (pen.)	Recap	Felipe 2'; Di Vaio 17' (pen.), 42'; Nyassi 66'

ESPN Wide World of Sports Complex, Bay Lake, Florida, USA
February 13
18:00 UTC-5

Sporting Kansas City	2–0	D.C. United
Convey 74'; Saad 81'	Recap

ESPN Wide World of Sports Complex, Bay Lake, Florida, USA

February 16
13:00 UTC-5

Montreal Impact	1–1	D.C. United
Pisanu 16'	Recap	Porter 85'

ESPN Wide World of Sports Complex, Bay Lake, Florida, USA
February 16
20:00 UTC-5

Tampa Bay Rowdies	0–1	Sporting Kansas City
	Recap	Zusi 76'

ESPN Wide World of Sports Complex, Bay Lake, Florida, USA

=== Championship round ===
==== Consolation matches ====
February 23
13:00 UTC-5

Philadelphia Union	0–2	D.C. United
	Recap	De Rosario 39' (pen.); Pajoy 67'

ESPN Wide World of Sports Complex, Orlando, Florida, USA

February 23
15:00 UTC-5

Toronto FC	0–1	Sporting Kansas City
	Recap	Bieler 23'

ESPN Wide World of Sports Complex, Orlando, Florida, USA

February 23
18:00 UTC-5

Orlando City	2–0	Tampa Bay Rowdies
Watson 1' (pen.); Chin 76'	Recap

ESPN Wide World of Sports Complex, Orlando, Florida, USA

==== Championship match ====
February 23
20:00 UTC-5

Montreal Impact	1–0	Columbus Crew
Mapp 54'	Recap

ESPN Wide World of Sports Complex, Orlando, Florida, USA

Montreal Impact	Columbus Crew SC

GK	1	Troy Perkins
DF	5	Jeb Brovsky
DF	13	Matteo Ferrari	(yellow card) 90'
DF	14	Alessandro Nesta
DF	6	Hassoun Camara
MF	8	Patrice Bernier
MF	21	Justin Mapp		(substituted off) 81'
MF	7	Felipe		(substituted off) 81'
MF	22	Davy Arnaud(c)		(substituted off) 81'
MF	31	Andrea Pisanu	(yellow card) 16'	(substituted off) 71'
FW	9	Marco Di Vaio		(substituted off) 76'
Substitutes
MF	15	Andrés Romero		(substituted on) 71'
FW	33	Andrew Wenger		(substituted on) 76'
MF	18	Collen Warner		(substituted on) 81'
MF	11	Sanna Nyassi		(substituted on) 81'
MF	16	Calum Mallace		(substituted on) 81'
Manager
(Switzerland) Marco Schällibaum

GK	30	Andy Gruenebaum
DF	3	Josh Williams
DF	14	Chad Marshall
DF	4	Gláuber	(yellow card) 73'
DF	2	Tyson Wahl
MF	11	Dominic Oduro		(substituted off) 65'
MF	5	Danny O'Rourke		(substituted off) 46'
MF	24	Agustin Viana	(yellow card) 26'	(substituted off) 46'
FW	12	Eddie Gaven
FW	33	Federico Higuaín		(substituted off) 69'
FW	25	Jairo Arrieta		(substituted off) 69'
Substitutes
MF	6	Tony Tchani		(substituted on) 46'
MF	8	Matias Sanchez		(substituted on) 46'
MF	13	Ethan Finlay		(substituted on) 65'
MF	17	Ben Speas		(substituted on) 69'
MF	26	Ryan Finley		(substituted on) 69'
Manager
(Poland) Robert Warzycha
