= Chad Barson =

American soccer player (born 1991)

Personal information
- Date of birth: 25 February 1991 (age 35)
- Place of birth: Columbus, Ohio, U.S.
- Height: 1.80 m (5 ft 11 in)
- Position: Defender

Youth career
- 2007: IMG Soccer Academy
- 2007–2009: Columbus Crew

College career
Years	Team	Apps	(Gls)
2009–2012	Akron Zips		

Senior career*
Years	Team	Apps	(Gls)
2010–2012	Michigan Bucks	14	(0)
2013–2016	Columbus Crew SC	50	(0)
2016	→ Pittsburgh Riverhounds (loan)	2	(0)
2017	FC Linköping City	26	(1)
Total		92	(1)

International career
2007	United States U17	12	(0)
2008–2009	United States U18	7	(0)
2010	United States U20	2	(0)
- * Club domestic league appearances and goals

Chad Barson (born February 25, 1991) is an American retired professional soccer player. He was the Ohio State Buckeyes men's soccer director of operations. He later attended medical school at Ohio University Heritage College of Osteopathic Medicine and specializes in pediatrics.

== Career statistics ==
Club	Season	League			Playoffs		Cup (Note: All appearances in the U.S. Open Cup)		Total	
Club	Season	Division	Apps	Goals	Apps	Goals	Apps	Goals	Apps	Goals
Michigan Bucks	2010	PDL	2	0	0	0	–		2	0
Michigan Bucks	2011	PDL	4	0	0	0	–		4	0
Michigan Bucks	2012	PDL	8	0	0	0	1	0	9	0
Michigan Bucks	Total		14	0	0	0	1	0	15	0
Columbus Crew SC	2013	MLS	20	0	–		1	0	21	0
Columbus Crew SC	2014	MLS	13	0	0	0	2	0	15	0
Columbus Crew SC	2015	MLS	10	0	0	0	2	0	12	0
Columbus Crew SC	2016	MLS	7	0	–		2	0	9	0
Columbus Crew SC	Total		50	0	0	0	7	0	57	0
Pittsburgh Riverhounds (loan)	2016	USL	2	0	–		0	0	2	0
FC Linköping City	2017	Division 2	26	1	–		–		26	1
Career total			92	1	0	0	8	0	100	1
