= Josh Williams (soccer) =

American soccer player (born 1988)

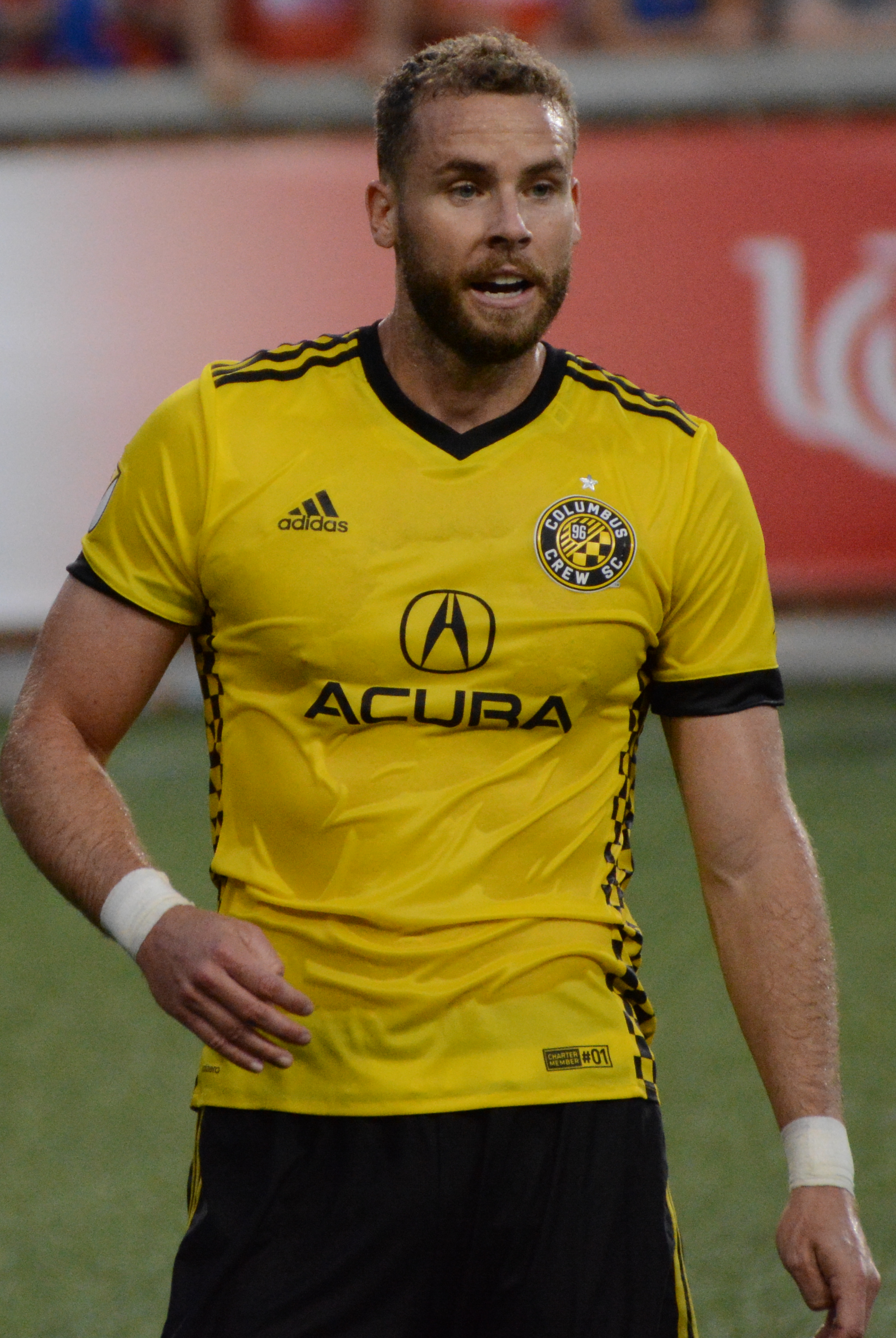
- Williams with Columbus Crew in 2017

Personal information
- Date of birth: April 18, 1988 (age 38)
- Place of birth: Akron, Ohio, United States
- Height: 6 ft 2 in (1.88 m)
- Position: Defender

Youth career
- 1995–2006: Internationals SC

College career
Years	Team	Apps	(Gls)
2006–2009	Cleveland State Vikings	74	(12)

Senior career*
Years	Team	Apps	(Gls)
2007–2010	Cleveland Internationals	38	(1)
2010–2014	Columbus Crew	71	(4)
2015	New York City	5	(0)
2015–2016	Toronto FC	27	(0)
2017–2023	Columbus Crew	112	(5)
2022–2023	Columbus Crew 2	2	(0)
Total		252	(10)

Managerial career
- 2025: Columbus Crew 2 (assistant)
- 2026: Columbus Crew (assistant)
- * Club domestic league appearances and goals

Josh Williams (born April 18, 1988) is an American former professional soccer player who played as a defender. He is currently an assistant coach for the Columbus Crew

== Youth and college ==
Born in Akron, Ohio, Williams grew up a fan of the Columbus Crew, attending their inaugural game. He is a graduate of Copley High School where he was a multi-sport athlete, lettering in soccer, basketball, and baseball. He was a co-captain and three-year varsity soccer player for the Indians, and finished his high school soccer career with 124 points, tied for the school record, after recording 44 goals and 21 assists in his junior and senior seasons.

During his high school soccer career, Williams was awarded several honors and accolades. He was named the Akron Touchdown Club's Soccer Player of the Year as a junior and earned second-team all-Ohio honors in his senior year. Williams was twice named all-Suburban League, all-Northeast Region, and NSCAA all-region. He was also named to the Akron Beacon Journal's all-star first team as a junior and senior.

In addition to soccer, Williams also played basketball, where he was a point guard, and baseball, where he played shortstop. Williams received recruiting interest as a baseball player from West Virginia and Kentucky and as a soccer player from Akron, but his only scholarship offer was from Cleveland State University and head coach Ali Kazemaini.

Williams started every game of his collegiate career; his 74 starts for the Vikings is tied for third in program history, and his 74 appearances are tied for seventh. As a freshman, he appeared in 18 games and scored twice, helping the Vikings go from a winless season the year before he arrived to eight wins. Williams scored his first collegiate goal on October 18, 2006, as part of a 2–0 victory over Detroit, and followed it up 10 days later with his first postseason goal, in a 3–2 loss in the Horizon League Tournament against Loyola. He was named to the Horizon League All-Newcomer Team at the end of the season. Williams fell off slightly his sophomore season, only tallying one goal and three assists across 17 appearances. He found his lone goal on September 19 in a 4–1 defeat to Notre Dame College. Williams added assists in back-to-back games in October and finished the season second on the team in assists and points. As a junior, Williams helped the Vikings to a 9–8–3 season, their first year with more wins than losses since 1993. He notched three goals and three assists on the season; those three assists were good for a tie for second on the team. Williams scored in back-to-back games in October, a 3–2 victory over Valparaiso and a 1–0 victory over Detroit that marked his first career game-winning goal. He also scored against Wright State in the quarterfinals of the league tournament, helping the Vikings pick up their first postseason victory since 2002. Williams was named to the Horizon League All-Tournament Team, one of four Vikings players to earn the honor. His senior season at Cleveland State overlapped with the freshman season of Brad Stuver, who he played alongside for two seasons in Columbus. Williams set career highs with his 20 appearances and six goals; those six goals tied for the team lead with Slavisa Ubiparipović. Williams scored the first goal of the season for the Vikings, as part of a 3–0 season-opening victory over St. Bonaventure, and also had a stretch of three straight games with a goal in mid-October. His three game-winning goals were the most on the team. Williams capped off his collegiate career by being named to the All-Horizon League First Team, alongside Ubiparipović. He appeared 74 times for Cleveland State across his four years, scoring 12 goals.

=== Cleveland Internationals ===
Williams had been a youth player for the Cleveland Internationals, and he joined the senior team in the USL Premier Development League following his freshman season at Cleveland State. He played sparingly for the Internationals during the 2007 PDL season, making just two appearances as the club finished sixth in the Great Lakes Division, 12 points outside of the playoff positions.

Following his sophomore season for the Vikings, Williams returned to the Internationals to help the club to the best season in their history. He scored once in 13 appearances during the regular season, as the Internationals placed second in the Great Lakes Division and qualified for the playoffs for the only time in club history. Williams saw action in both playoff games, picking up a yellow card in the Divisional Round victory over Toronto Lynx. He finished the season with one goal in 15 appearances for the Internationals.

Williams again joined the Internationals for the 2009 PDL season, but was unable to help the club repeat their achievements from 2008. He appeared 12 times for Cleveland, but the club finished 12 points outside the playoffs in the Great Lakes Division.

After going undrafted in the 2010 MLS SuperDraft and without a professional contract, Williams rejoined the Internationals for the 2010 PDL season. He appeared 11 times for the club, but could not prevent the Internationals from finishing at the bottom of the Great Lakes Division, with just eight points from 16 games. The senior club folded at the end of the season, although it continued to exist as a youth team. Williams appeared 40 times in all for the Internationals, with one goal.

== Club career ==
=== Columbus Crew ===
Williams went on trial with MLS club Kansas City Wizards in the spring of 2010, and appeared for the reserve team of Columbus Crew in a match against Marshall. After spending the summer in the PDL with the Internationals, Williams signed with Columbus on September 16, 2010. He said the signing was "a dream come true", as he was a lifelong Crew fan and had attended the first game in club history in 1996. Williams made his club debut on September 29, in the group stage of the 2010–11 CONCACAF Champions League, away to Municipal. He started and went 67 minutes before being substituted for Steven Lenhart as Columbus fell 2–1. Williams also appeared in the group stage finale for the Crew, playing 82 minutes of a 4–1 victory away to Joe Public, but did not see time in any other competition and finished the season with only the two CCL appearances for Columbus.

In June 2011, Williams was suspended for 10 games and fined 10% of his salary after testing positive for methandienone metabolites, a performance-enhancing drug. The positive test came after Williams had used an over-the-counter supplement he purchased at a drugstore. His suspension took effect for a June 12 meeting with Chicago Fire and expired after an August 5 game against Colorado Rapids. Williams had already missed time prior to the suspension with a torn labrum in his hip; he was unavailable for 19 games on the season because of the injury and suspension. Williams did not make an appearance for Columbus in any competition, and was left unprotected for the 2011 MLS Expansion Draft, but was not selected and thus returned to the Crew for the 2012 season.

After two seasons with the Crew, Williams made his MLS debut on March 24, 2012, in a 2–0 victory over Montreal Impact. He came off the bench to replace Sebastián Miranda and played the final 15 minutes of the Columbus victory. Williams appeared just twice through the first month of the season, but was handed his first league start on April 21. He went the full 90 minutes against Houston Dynamo, helping the Crew tally a 2–2 draw. Williams won a place in the starting lineup, as he started the next 20 games in all competitions. He came close to scoring his first career goal for Columbus a multitude of times throughout the season, before ultimately netting a header against Philadelphia Union on August 29 from a Federico Higuaín free kick. However, Williams was not on the field to see the 2–1 victory, as he picked up his first career red card in the 68th minute after an off-the-ball scuffle with Antoine Hoppenot. Williams finished the season with 31 appearances for Columbus across all competitions, splitting time at left, center, and right back, and added one goal. Described as "a pleasant surprise filling in all over the backline", Williams had his contract option picked up to by Columbus, ensuring his return to the club for the 2013 season.

After playing all three defensive positions in 2012, Williams was installed as the primary right back for Columbus to begin the 2013 season, and did not take long to make an impact. In the season opener against Chivas USA, Williams started and scored just the second goal of his MLS career. His 89th minute tally helped the Crew to a 3–0 victory on the day. Williams continued to pour in the goals through the first two months of the season, also finding the back of the net in victories over D.C. United on March 23 and April 27. He was slowed down by injuries in the back half of the season, however, missing time with left calf inflammation and a concussion. Williams finished the season with three goals in 27 appearances, all in league play, while appearing as a right and center back. His contract expired at the end of the season, but he re-signed for the Crew on November 26.

Williams kept his role as the starting right back to begin the 2014 season, starting the season opener against D.C. United and providing an assist to Jairo Arrieta as part of a 3–0 victory for the Crew. Williams appeared in the first 14 matches of the season, but then saw his season derailed by medical issues. He suffered a groin injury in June, then underwent surgery in July to remove a blood clot in his right arm. He returned to practice, but was facing a high risk of reclotting, and therefore underwent another surgery on July 16 to remove a rib and alleviate the issue. Williams was placed on the disabled list following the procedure, and missed the remainder of the regular season. He was able to return to action in the playoffs, coming off the bench to replace Eric Gehrig in the second leg of the conference semifinals against New England Revolution. Williams made his first appearance in more than five months and first career playoff appearance, but could not prevent a 3–1 defeat on the day and the elimination of the Crew from the playoffs. He finished the season having made 16 appearances across all competitions. On November 18, Williams was one of 16 players who had their contract options picked up by the club.

=== New York City FC ===
On December 8, 2014, Williams was traded to MLS expansion club New York City FC in exchange for allocation money. He became the eighth signing in club history, and the third defender to join the club ahead of its first season.

Williams was named to the starting 11 for the first match in NYCFC history, away to fellow expansion side Orlando City SC on March 8, 2015. He went the full 90 minutes as the match ended in a 1–1 draw. Williams also started the club's first home match at Yankee Stadium, going 79 minutes of a 2–0 victory over New England Revolution before being replaced by Shay Facey. Williams traveled with the team to face Colorado Rapids, but was sent to the emergency room on March 20 and eventually diagnosed with viral pericarditis. Two games after his return, he then suffered an adductor strain that caused him to miss all but one match until July. On July 25, Williams was waived by NYCFC. He finished his spell with the club having made five appearances, all in MLS play.

=== Toronto FC ===
On July 31, 2015, Williams was picked up off waivers by Toronto FC, the club's second defensive signing of the summer transfer window. He made his club debut on August 15, playing the full 90 minutes in a 3–0 defeat against New York Red Bulls. Williams started the final 12 matches of the regular season for the Reds after his arrival, helping Toronto qualify for the playoffs for the first time in club history. He started in the knockout round against Montreal Impact, pairing with Ahmed Kantari at center back as Toronto was eliminated by a 3–0 scoreline. Williams made 13 appearances across all competitions for Toronto. On December 1, he was one of 13 players who had their contract options picked up by the club, ensuring his return to Toronto for the 2016 season.

Williams made his 2016 season debut on March 13, as Toronto played away to his former club, New York City FC. He was named on the bench, and replaced Will Johnson in second half stoppage time to help preserve a 2–2 draw. Williams started just 11 matches on the season, his lowest total since 2011 with Columbus, but Toronto won in eight of those starts. He appeared for the final time on the season on August 24, starting a 2–1 victory away to Orlando City SC. Williams did not appear in any of Toronto's last eight regular season matches as the club qualified for the playoffs for a second season in a row. He was named on the bench for all six of Toronto's playoff matches, including MLS Cup 2016 against Seattle Sounders FC, but did not make an appearance in any match. Williams finished the season with 15 appearances, all in league play. At the end of the year, Williams' contract expired, and was not renewed by the club. He departed Toronto having made 28 appearances across two seasons.

=== Return to Columbus ===
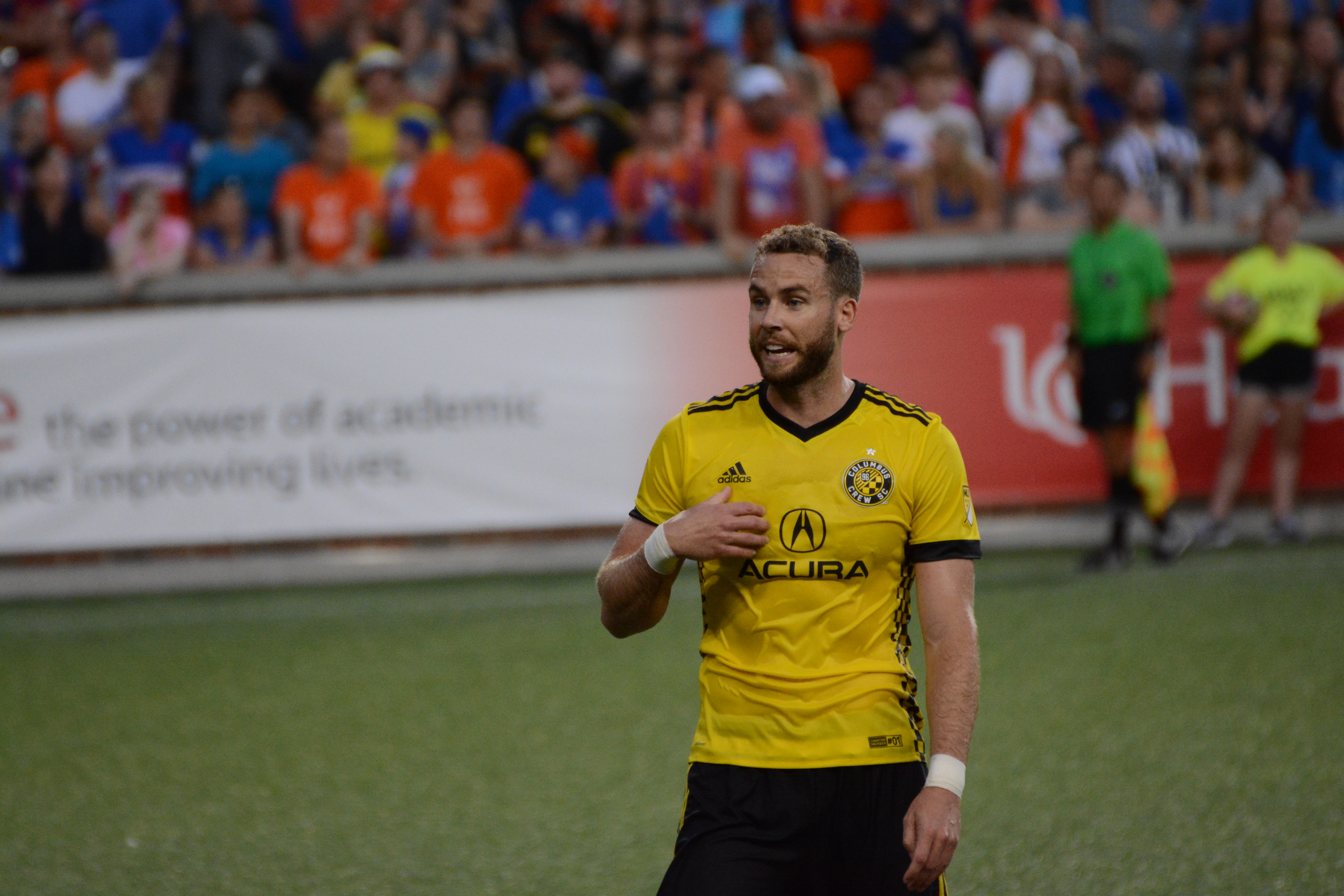
Williams in 2017

On December 22, 2016, Williams was selected by his former club, Columbus Crew with the third pick of Stage 2 of the 2016 MLS Re-Entry Draft. He officially re-signed for the club on January 5, 2017; per club policy, terms of the contract were not disclosed.

Prior to the season, Williams was named as part of the leadership council for the Crew, alongside Federico Higuaín, Ethan Finlay, Justin Meram, and Jonathan Mensah. The five collectively served as vice-captains behind captain Wil Trapp. Although Williams was named as part of the council, he had to wait to make his season debut, starting on March 18 away to D.C. United and helping keep a clean sheet in a 2–0 victory. Williams played sporadically through the front half of the season, but jumped into the starting lineup after the sale of Nicolai Næss to Heerenveen, going on to start 16 of the last 17 games on the season. Late in the year, Williams found his scoring touch, pounding in headers in three of the club's last four games of the regular season. On September 23, Williams scored the winning goal in a 3–2 victory over New York Red Bulls, his first goal since 2013. He then scored his second game-winning goal in as many games on September 30, as part of a 2–0 takedown of D.C. United, and closed the regular season with the match-tying goal in a 2–2 draw with his former club, New York City FC. In the MLS Cup Playoffs, Williams started all five of the Crew's matches, including facing both of his former clubs in the conference semifinals and finals. He finished the season having made 28 appearances across all competitions, and tied his career high with three goals. On December 1, Williams had his contract option exercised by Columbus, ensuring his return to the club in 2018.

During the 2018 season, Williams missed the first three games due to injury, and appeared in 22 total games, including one in the conference semifinals against the New York Red Bulls. On November 28, 2018, it was announced that the club had picked up his second-consecutive contract option.

In the 2019 season, Williams played in 16 matches and scored two goals, both from set-piece headers.

At the start of the 2020 season, Williams was initially a backup player. However, after an injury to starter Vito Wormgoor, Williams was elevated to the starting lineup. On October 28, 2020, Major League Soccer announced that it had retroactively suspended Williams for four matches due to a violation of league rules, starting on October 18 and ending November 1. At the end of the year, the Crew won MLS Cup, with Williams playing in all 90 minutes in the 3–0 victory against Seattle Sounders FC.

In the 2021 season, Williams made a return to continental soccer after last appearing in 2010. However, he was hampered by injuries, missing 14 straight games in the middle of the season due to an ankle injury.

At the start of the 2022 season, Williams was sidelined with a hamstring injury, causing him to miss the first five games. He eventually made his season debut on April 16, coming on in the 60th minute against Orlando City.

== Career statistics ==
Club	Season	League			Playoffs (Note: Includes PDL Playoffs and MLS Cup Playoffs)		National cup (Note: Includes U.S. Open Cup)		Continental		Total	
Club	Season	Division	Apps	Goals	Apps	Goals	Apps	Goals	Apps	Goals	Apps	Goals
Cleveland Internationals	2007	PDL	2	0	–		–		–		2	0
Cleveland Internationals	2008	PDL	13	1	2	0	–		–		15	1
Cleveland Internationals	2009	PDL	12	0	–		–		–		12	0
Cleveland Internationals	2010	PDL	11	0	–		–		–		11	0
Cleveland Internationals	Total		38	1	2	0	0	0	0	0	40	1
Columbus Crew	2010	MLS	0	0	0	0	0	0	2	0	2	0
Columbus Crew	2011	MLS	0	0	0	0	0	0	0	0	0	0
Columbus Crew	2012	MLS	30	1	–		1	0	–		31	1
Columbus Crew	2013	MLS	27	3	–		0	0	–		27	3
Columbus Crew	2014	MLS	14	0	1	0	1	0	–		16	0
Columbus Crew	Total		71	4	1	0	2	0	2	0	76	4
New York City FC	2015	MLS	5	0	–		0	0	–		5	0
Toronto FC	2015	MLS	12	0	1	0	0	0	–		13	0
Toronto FC	2016	MLS	15	0	0	0	0	0	–		15	0
Toronto FC	Total		27	0	1	0	0	0	0	0	28	0
Columbus Crew	2017	MLS	22	3	5	0	1	0	–		28	3
Columbus Crew	2018	MLS	21	0	1	0	0	0	–		22	0
Columbus Crew	2019	MLS	16	2	–		0	0	–		16	2
Columbus Crew	2020	MLS	12	0	5 (Note: Includes 4 appearances in MLS Cup Playoffs and 1 appearance in the MLS is Back Tournament knockout round.)	0	0	0	–		17	0
Columbus Crew	2021	MLS	18	0	–		0	0	5 (Note: Includes 4 appearances in CONCACAF Champions League and 1 appearance in the Campeones Cup)	0	23	0
Columbus Crew	2022	MLS	23	0	–		1	0	–		24	0
Columbus Crew	2023	MLS	0	0	0	0	0	0	–		0	0
Columbus Crew	Total		112	5	11	0	1	0	5	0	130	5
Career total			230	11	15	0	3	0	7	0	255	10

== Honors ==
Toronto FC

- Canadian Championship: 2016
- Eastern Conference (Playoffs): 2016

Columbus Crew

- MLS Cup: 2020, 2023
- Campeones Cup: 2021
