= Ryan Finley (soccer) =

American soccer player (born 1991)

Personal information
- Date of birth: March 27, 1991 (age 35)
- Place of birth: Lumberton, New Jersey, U.S.
- Height: 1.82 m (6 ft 0 in)
- Position: Forward

Youth career
- 2006–2007: IMG Soccer Academy
- 2008–2009: Players Development Academy

College career
Years	Team	Apps	(Gls)
2009–2010	Duke Blue Devils	39	(28)
2011–2012	Notre Dame Fighting Irish	39	(28)

Senior career*
Years	Team	Apps	(Gls)
2008	Ocean City Barons	8	(2)
2010–2011	Central Jersey Spartans	16	(5)
2011	Indiana Invaders	2	(0)
2012	Reading United	8	(2)
2013–2014	Columbus Crew	14	(1)
2014	→ Dayton Dutch Lions (loan)	4	(0)
2014	Chivas USA	16	(1)
2015	Charlotte Independence	21	(8)
2016	Ängelholms FF	15	(4)
2016	Næstved	3	(0)
2017	IFK Värnamo	4	(1)
Total		113	(24)

International career
2006–2007	United States U17	22	(10)
2007–2009	United States U18	5	(0)
2010	United States U20	1	(0)
- * Club domestic league appearances and goals

Ryan Finley (born March 27, 1991) is an American former professional soccer player.

== Career ==
=== Youth and college ===
Born in Lumberton Township, New Jersey, Finley spent most of his high-school career at the Players Development Academy and the IMG Soccer Academy. In 2009, while a senior at Rancocas Valley Regional High School, Finley led his soccer team to the New Jersey state title in which he scored 20 goals throughout the season and was selected for the ESPN RISE Fall Boys' Soccer All-America team.

In 2009, Finley attended Duke University, where he played for the Duke Blue Devils for two seasons before spending his final two years playing for the Notre Dame Fighting Irish at the University of Notre Dame. In his freshman year at Duke Finley scored a team-leading 11 goals while also being named to the NSCAA All-South Region second team and ACC All-Freshman teams. In his sophomore year Finley led the Atlantic Coast Conference with 17 goals while also leading the NCAA in goals per game with 0.94 per game. That year Finley earned All-ACC first team honors and was voted the ACC Offensive Player of the Year.

In 2011, after transferring to Notre Dame, Finley led the soccer team with 7 goals that season and was named to the All-BIG EAST Second Team and All-Great Lakes Region Third Team. In his senior year Finley finished second in the country in goals scored with 21 while being named to the NSCAA All-America First Team, All-Great Lakes Region First Team, and the Big East Offensive Player of the Year.

Finley finished second in the Herman Trophy voting in 2012.

=== Columbus Crew ===
On January 17, 2013, Finley was selected 9th overall in the 2013 MLS SuperDraft by Columbus Crew. He made his professional debut for the Crew on March 9, 2013, against Vancouver Whitecaps FC at BC Place in which he came on in the 90th minute for Gláuber as the Crew lost the game 2–1. He then scored the first goal of his professional career on September 4, 2013, against Houston Dynamo at Columbus Crew Stadium in which he found the net in the 47th minute as the Crew won the game 2–0.

=== Chivas USA ===
On May 8, 2014, Finley was traded by Columbus to Chivas USA in exchange for a second-round pick in the 2016 MLS SuperDraft.

=== Charlotte Independence ===
Finley signed with USL club Charlotte Independence on March 25, 2015.

=== Ängelholms FF ===
Finley signed with Swedish side Ängelholms FF on March 17, 2016.

== Career statistics ==
Club	Season	League			Playoffs		Cup		Total	
Club	Season	Division	Apps	Goals	Apps	Goals	Apps	Goals	Apps	Goals
Ocean City Barons	2008	PDL	8	2	–		–		8	2
Central Jersey Spartans	2010	PDL	9	4	–		–		9	4
Central Jersey Spartans	2011	PDL	7	1	–		–		7	1
Central Jersey Spartans	Total		16	5	0	0	0	0	16	5
Indiana Invaders	2011	PDL	2	0	–		–		2	0
Reading United	2012	PDL	8	2	0	0	1	1	9	3
Columbus Crew	2013	MLS	14	1	–		0	0	14	1
Columbus Crew	2014	MLS	0	0	0	0	0	0	0	0
Columbus Crew	Total		14	1	0	0	0	0	14	1
Dayton Dutch Lions (loan)	2014	USL	4	0	–		0	0	4	0
Chivas USA	2014	MLS	16	1	–		1	1	17	2
Charlotte Independence	2015	USL	23	8	–		3	1	26	9
Ängelholms FF	2016	Superettan	15	4	–		0	0	15	4
Næstved	2016–17	1. Division	3	0	–		0	0	3	0
IFK Värnamo	2017	Superettan	4	1	–		0	0	4	1
Career total			113	24	0	0	5	3	118	27
