= Konrad Warzycha =

Polish footballer

Personal information
- Full name: Konrad Warzycha
- Date of birth: 14 February 1989 (age 37)
- Place of birth: Zabrze, Poland
- Height: 6 ft 1 in (1.85 m)
- Position: Midfielder

Youth career
- –2006: Ohio Blast

College career
Years	Team	Apps	(Gls)
2007–2010	Ohio State Buckeyes		

Senior career*
Years	Team	Apps	(Gls)
2011–2012	Sporting Kansas City	1	(0)
2012	→ Carolina RailHawks (loan)	1	(0)
2013	Columbus Crew	13	(0)
- * Club domestic league appearances and goals

Konrad Warzycha (Polish pronunciation: [ˈkɔnrad vaˈʐɨxa]; born 14 February 1989) is a Polish former professional footballer who played as a midfielder.

== Career ==
=== College and amateur ===
Warzycha was born in Poland, and later lived in England and Hungary, before moving with his family to the United States in 1997. He grew up in Dublin, Ohio, attended Jerome High School, and played for the Ohio Blast club team, before going on to play college soccer at Ohio State University. As a junior in 2009 Warzycha earned a spot on the All-Big Ten Second Team, while as a senior he started all 18 of his Buckeyes' games, scoring eight goals in his final year with the team, and was named to the All-Big Ten First Team.

=== Professional ===
On January 13, 2011, Warzycha was drafted in the third round by Sporting Kansas City in the 2011 MLS SuperDraft. He signed with the club on March 3, 2011. On May 29, 2012, Warzycha made his debut for the club in a 3-2 win over Orlando City in the Lamar Hunt U.S. Open Cup. On August 28, 2012 Warzycha was loaned to Carolina RailHawks for the remainder of the NASL season. On September 12, 2012 Warzycha was recalled by Sporting Kansas City from his loan. Warzycha was released by Kansas City on November 19, 2012.

Warzycha signed with the Columbus Crew on February 27, 2013. On April 27, 2013 he came on, late in the game as a substitution and become the second father-son, coach-player tandem in MLS history. After his father was dismissed in September, Konrad Warzycha's option was not picked up following the season.

== Personal life ==
Warzycha is the son of former Polish international Robert Warzycha, formerly the head coach of Columbus Crew.
