= Matías Sánchez (footballer, born 1987) =

Argentine footballer

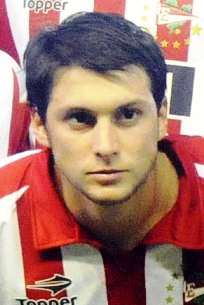
- Sánchez with Estudiantes in 2010

Personal information
- Full name: Matías Ariel Sánchez
- Date of birth: 18 August 1987 (age 39)
- Place of birth: Temperley, Argentina
- Height: 1.73 m (5 ft 8 in)
- Position: Midfielder

Team information
- Current team: Brown de Adrogué

Youth career
- Racing Club

Senior career*
Years	Team	Apps	(Gls)
2006–2008	Racing Club	46	(1)
2008–2013	Estudiantes	94	(1)
2013–2014	Columbus Crew	14	(1)
2014	Arsenal de Sarandí	7	(0)
2014–2015	Levadiakos	8	(0)
2015–2016	Unión Santa Fe	15	(0)
2016–2017	Temperley	28	(1)
2017–2018	Melbourne Victory	25	(0)
2018–2019	San Martín SJ	2	(0)
2020	Gimnasia Jujuy	4	(0)
2020–	Brown de Adrogué	47	(4)

International career
2007	Argentina U20	14	(0)
- * Club domestic league appearances and goals as of 19:46, 29 June 2022 (UTC)

Matías Ariel Sánchez (Latin American Spanish: [maˈti.as ˈsantʃes]; born 18 August 1987) is an Argentine footballer who played for Brown de Adrogué.

== Club career ==
Sánchez made his way through Racing Club's youth system to make his debut in a 0–3 defeat to Boca Juniors on March 5, 2006. He became a regular in the Racing team, appearing in 15 of the 19 games during the 2006 Apertura tournament.

Sánchez was part of the Estudiantes de La Plata squad that won the 2009 Copa Libertadores.

Following the 2012 Major League Soccer season, Sánchez had been rumored as a target of the Columbus Crew. On February 8, 2013, Sánchez officially signed with the club. Sanchez was released following one season in Columbus.

On 16 August 2017, Sánchez signed for A-League club Melbourne Victory on a one-year deal. On 15 May 2018, Sánchez was released by Melbourne Victory along with three of his teammates.

== International career ==
In 2007, Sánchez was selected to represent the Argentine under-20 team at the South American Youth Championship held in Paraguay. He was also part of the U-20 squad that won the 2007 FIFA U-20 World Cup in Canada.

== Personal life ==
Sánchez has a wife, a daughter and a son.

== Honours ==
=== Club ===
Estudiantes

- Copa Libertadores (1): 2009
- Argentine Primera División (1): 2010 Apertura

Melbourne Victory

- A-League Championship (1): 2017–18

=== International ===
Argentina U-20

- FIFA U-20 World Cup (1): 2007
