= Agustín Viana =

American-Uruguayan footballer (born 1983)

Personal information
- Full name: Agustín Viana Ache
- Date of birth: 23 August 1983 (age 43)
- Place of birth: Chicago, Illinois, United States
- Height: 1.81 m (5 ft 11 in)
- Position: Defender

Senior career*
Years	Team	Apps	(Gls)
2001–2005	Bella Vista	57	(5)
2006–2008	Nacional Montevideo	35	(1)
2008	→ Atlético Mineiro (loan)	10	(1)
2008	Bella Vista	11	(2)
2009	CFR Cluj	1	(0)
2009–2010	Gallipoli	30	(1)
2010–2011	Bella Vista	24	(3)
2011–2012	Levadiakos	13	(0)
2012–2013	Bella Vista	15	(2)
2013–2014	Columbus Crew	24	(1)
2015–2016	Danubio	19	(0)

International career
- Uruguay U20
- * Club domestic league appearances and goals

Agustín Viana (born 23 August 1983) is an American-born Uruguayan former professional footballer.

== Career ==
Viana began his career with Uruguayan side Bella Vista. He remained at the club for four years before drawing the attention of Uruguayan power Nacional Montevideo. He then joined Nacional and helped the club in capturing the 2005–06 Uruguayan Primera División title. With Nacional he made 35 league appearances and scored one goal. Viana joined Atlético Mineiro in January 2008 on loan from Nacional. Viana played for the club in the 2008 Copa do Brasil and Campeonato Mineiro. After one year in Brazil Viana returned to his first club Bella Vista.

In January 2009, Viana transferred to CFR Cluj. However, he did not feature regularly for the Romanian club. After a brief stay in Romania Viana signed with Italian club Gallipoli and quickly established himself as a starter. The following season, he returned to Bella Vista and was one of Uruguays top defenders. In July 2010 Nacional made public his desire of reacquiring Viana. However, he signed with Greek club Levadiakos and appeared in 13 league matches for the club. In 2012, he returned to Bella Vista and started all of the club's 15 matches in the Apertura and scored 2 goals.

On 28 January 2013 he signed with the Columbus Crew. Viana was released on 18 November 2014 after two season with The Crew.

== International career ==
Viana was part of Uruguay's youth team set ups, including the U20 squad that competed in the 2003 South American U-20 Championship held in his native Uruguay.

== Honours ==
Nacional Montevideo

- Primera División: 2005–06
