= Federico Higuaín =

Argentine footballer

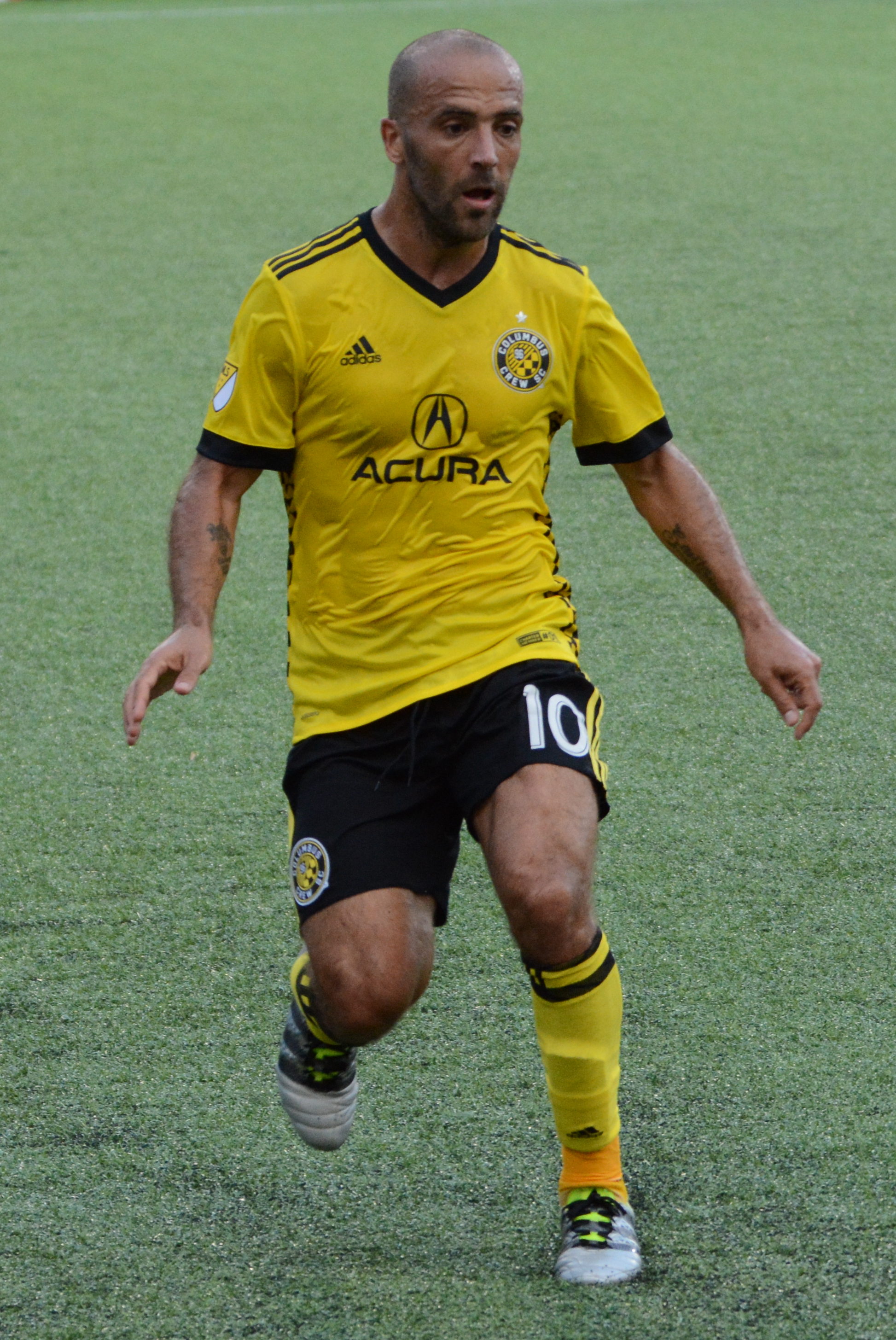
- Higuaín with Columbus Crew in 2017

Personal information
- Full name: Federico Fernando Higuaín
- Date of birth: 25 October 1984 (age 42)
- Place of birth: Buenos Aires, Argentina
- Height: 1.72 m (5 ft 8 in)
- Positions: Forward; attacking midfielder

Youth career
- Club Palermo
- –2003: River Plate

Senior career*
Years	Team	Apps	(Gls)
2003–2007	River Plate	5	(0)
2005–2007	→ Nueva Chicago (loan)	71	(26)
2007–2008	Beşiktaş	9	(0)
2008	→ Club América (loan)	13	(1)
2008–2009	Independiente	18	(1)
2009–2010	Godoy Cruz	36	(11)
2010–2012	Colón	62	(10)
2012–2019	Columbus Crew	193	(55)
2020	D.C. United	10	(2)
2020–2021	Inter Miami	29	(3)
Total		446	(109)

Managerial career
- 2021: Inter Miami (academy)
- Inter Miami II (assistant)
- 2022–2024: Inter Miami II
- 2025–2026: Columbus Crew 2
- * Club domestic league appearances and goals as of 4 February 2022

Federico Fernando Higuaín (Spanish: [feðeˈɾiko jɣwaˈin]; born 25 October 1984) is an Argentine former professional footballer who played as a forward and attacking midfielder.

He played 157 games and scored 35 goals in the Argentine Primera División for River Plate, Nueva Chicago, Independiente, Godoy Cruz and Colón between 2003 and 2012. He also had brief spells in Turkey with Beşiktaş J.K. and Mexico with Club América in 2007–08.

In 2012, he signed for the Columbus Crew for a then club-record fee of US$650,000, and won the MLS Newcomer of the Year Award in his first season. An icon of the club, he made over 200 appearances across all competitions, scoring over 50 goals. He is also the club's leader in regular season assists (63), penalty-kick goals (20), and game winning assists (20).

== Early life ==
Higuaín was born in Buenos Aires, Argentina, the son of the Argentine former footballer Jorge Higuaín. Higuaín has three brothers, including Gonzalo, who is a former footballer. He is of Basque descent through his father.

== Club career ==
=== Early career ===
Nicknamed Pipa, Higuaín signed with River Plate as a youngster, playing 5 games and registering no goals. He soon went on loan to Nueva Chicago in the Argentine second division, where he played 77 total games, scoring 29 goals. He also impressed during stints at Godoy Cruz and Colón de Santa Fe.

In August 2007, Higuaín signed a three-year contract at Beşiktaş J.K. of the Turkish Süper Lig, for a US$1.65 million fee. He did not settle in Istanbul, with the player calling the move "a mistake." The following February he was loaned to Mexico's Club América for the remainder of the year, where he scored one goal in the league, and one goal in the Copa Libertadores.

=== Columbus Crew ===
==== 2012 season ====
On 27 July 2012, Higuaín joined the Columbus Crew as the team's third-ever designated player, for a then club-record fee of US$650,000. Higuaín later credited former Crew player Guillermo Barros Schelotto with helping convince him to move to the United States, despite his initial reservations about playing in an unfamiliar league. His debut came on 19 August as a substitute against the Houston Dynamo, where he assisted Eddie Gaven's go-ahead goal with a well-placed ball over the top just 13 minutes later. Three days later, he earned his first MLS start against Toronto FC and, in the fourth minute, once again set up a Gaven opener before notching the winning goal himself. The following match saw him score two goals from free kicks in a 4–3 victory over the New England Revolution. For his performances over his first several matches, Higuaín was named MLS Player of the Week for weeks 25 and 26 of the 2012 Major League Soccer season. The season came to an end with him netting both goals in a 2–1 victory against Toronto FC on the final matchday. During his first half-season in Columbus, the Argentine scored 5 and assisted 6 across his thirteen appearances.

==== 2013 season ====
In the beginning of the 2013 season, Higuaín was named captain and scored in a 3–0 opening-day victory over Chivas USA on 2 March. He scored in back-to-back league games with both goals coming via penalty kick, a 2–2 draw against New York Red Bulls and a 1–1 draw against the Houston Dynamo. On 10 August, he scored both goals in a 2–0 victory over New York Red Bulls, including a chip from well outside the penalty area that was voted Goal of the Week. The following match he again scored both goals in a 2–0 win over Toronto FC, chipping the goalkeeper from 22 yards away. After being sent off for a second yellow in a match against Real Salt Lake, Higuaín returned to the lineup on 14 September, assisting on both of the Crew's goals in a 2–1 win against the Montreal Impact.

==== 2014 season ====
To start off the 2014 season, Higuaín changed his number from 33 to 10, and once again scored on the first game of the season, this time bagging two goals in a 3–0 win against D.C. United. He scored two goals and added one assist in the match at Portland on 17 May, converting a penalty kick goal and a chipped goal before adding an assist en route to MLS Player of the Week Honors for Week 11. Following the 2014 Major League Soccer season in which Higuaín tallied a team-leading eleven goals and seven assists, he was signed to a new contract, the most lucrative deal ever given by the Crew at the time. At the time of signing his new contract, Higuaín had been ranked fifth in the league in goals, first in penalty-kick goals, and one of only eight players to score double-digit goals in the previous two seasons since entering the league.

==== 2015 season ====
His first goal and assist during the 2015 season came in the same match, a 3–0 victory hosting Orlando City on 18 April. He scored the first goal of the game via the penalty spot in a 3–1 victory over the Chicago Fire on 19 July, On 19 September, Higuaín made his 100th appearance for the Crew in a 2–1 win at D.C. United. On the penultimate game of the regular season, Higuaín scored in a Columbus win, but was suspended for the final game of the regular season for yellow card accumulation. During the playoffs, he scored away in an eventual 4–3 aggregate win against the Montreal Impact in the quarter-finals, and assisted in the only goal scored by Columbus in the 2–1 MLS Cup Final defeat to the Portland Timbers at home.

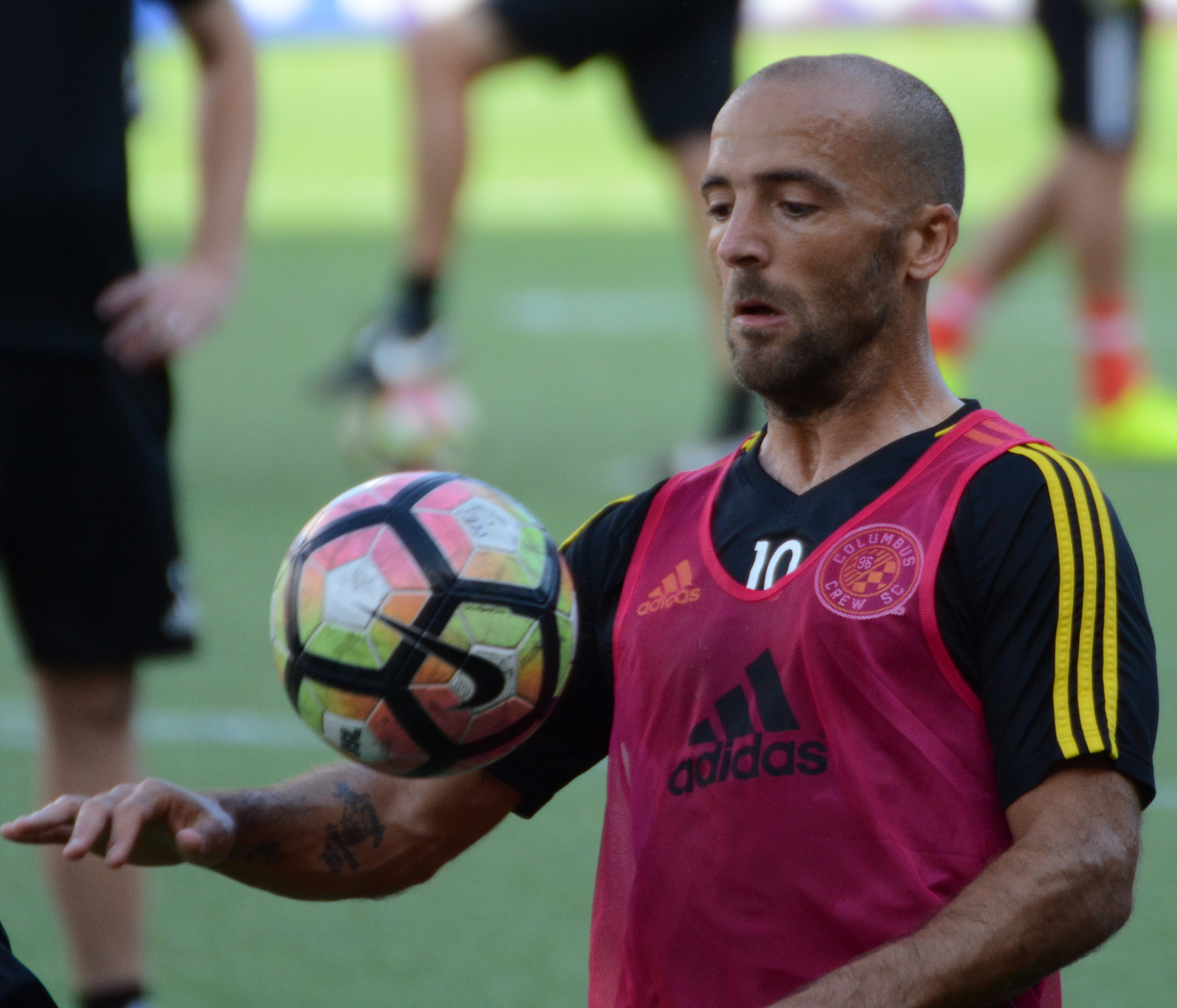
Higuaín warming up before a match in 2017

==== 2016 season ====
A "tumultuous" 2016 season began on a high note as Higuaín scored a bicycle kick goal on matchday one in a 2–1 defeat at Portland. During the 5 May clash versus the Montreal Impact, he and teammate Kei Kamara got into a verbal argument about who should take a penalty kick. A kick, in which, if converted, would have given Kamara his first career hat-trick. Higuaín refused, and instead took it himself. The kick was made, giving Columbus a 4–1 lead. The lead was ultimately relinquished, with the game ending in a 4–4 tie. Kamara publicly criticized Higuaín, and was subsequently traded "for the culture of the club." Higuaín missed six games in the middle of the season after undergoing hernia surgery. Two months later, he missed a further seven games recovering from complications from surgery. He returned on the final game of the season, a 4–1 loss to New York City FC. He ended the season scoring four goals and adding three assists in 20 appearances, as the Crew missed out on the playoffs.

==== 2017 season ====
Higuaín's first goal of the new campaign came on 18 March against D.C. United, a 2–0 victory. He went on to score in three consecutive matches, and later began another scoring streak, finding the net in four straight league games. He appeared in the first ever Hell is Real derby versus FC Cincinnati on 14 June in a U.S. Open Cup game, a game which ultimately ended in defeat for Columbus. On 23 September 2017, Higuaín recorded three assists in a game versus New York Red Bulls. After publicly insinuating mid-season that the 2017 season would be his last with the Crew, he signed a one-year extension on 3 October. He helped the Crew to qualify for the playoffs and reach the Eastern Conference finals.

==== 2018 season ====
“[Higuain is cerebral] in how he analyzes it on the field, and executes his role on the field. He understands multiple facets of the game extremely well, whether that’s the tempo of it, the rhythm of it, when to play the right passes, when not to play the right passes, when to slow it down, when to speed it up. It’s this all-encompassing idea that he is able to put out on the field game-in and game-out.”

— Wil Trapp, Higuaín's teammate at Columbus.

He scored the game-winning goal during the first match of the 2018 season on the road against Toronto FC in his 150th league appearance for the club. Higuaín scored his second goal of the season and 50th with the club in the following match against the Montreal Impact. Two matches later, he notched his 50th Crew assist via a to put him in the MLS 50/50 club. On 26 April, he signed a contract extension through the 2019 season. On 2 June, he scored and assisted in the 3–3 tie at home to Toronto after being down 3–0 at halftime. He was involved in both goals in the 2–1 victory against the Colorado Rapids on 22 September, scoring once and notching an assist. During the first round of the 2018 MLS Cup playoffs, Higuaín played the entire match, scoring both of the Crew's goals, and scored the opening spot kick in the penalty shootout to send Columbus to the following round three days later, where he came off the bench and assisted the lone goal in the win at home versus the New York Red Bulls. Columbus would ultimately lose the aggregate series 3–1.

==== 2019 season ====
On 2 March, in the opening match of the new season, Higuaín assisted a Gastón Sauro header from a corner. On 25 May, in a game against the Colorado Rapids, Higuaín was injured, and subsequently received anterior cruciate ligament surgery, ruling him out for the remainder of the season. On 21 October, Columbus Crew announced that they decided not to extend his contract for the next season as a player, instead offering a "non-playing job". Higuaín declined the offer, as he was not ready to retire. With Columbus, Higuaín scored 59 goals in 210 appearances in all competitions, and left the club as the all time regular season assist leader with 63.

=== D.C. United ===
On 2 March 2020, Higuaín joined D.C. United as a player and Player Development Coach. On 13 July 2020, he made his first appearance in an "MLS is Back" tournament match against Toronto FC. With D.C. United losing 2–0 and at a man disadvantage due to a first-half ejection, Higuaín came on as a substitute in the 80th minute and scored on a breakaway in the 84th minute. D.C. United added a second goal in injury time to force a 2–2 draw.

=== Inter Miami CF ===
On 10 October 2020, D.C. United traded Higuaín to Inter Miami in exchange for $50,000 in General Allocation Money, where Higuaín joined his brother Gonzalo. Higuaín re-signed with Miami on 28 January 2021 for the 2021 season. Following the 2021 season, Higuaín announced his retirement from playing professional football.

== Style of play ==
A diminutive playmaker with a slender physique, Higuaín was known for his technique, vision, intelligence and "instinctual creativity" on the ball, and his ability to provide assists for his teammates made him capable of playing as a second striker or as an attacking midfielder. Buenos Aires-based journalist Daniel Colasimone has stated that "[h]is role is more to harass opposition defenses with intelligent runs, fine ball control and incisive passing. His hard work on and off the ball, and affable personality made him well-liked wherever he played in Argentina." His coach at Columbus, Gregg Berhalter, said of him in 2018: “The game is about entertainment, and it’s nice to see a guy that the fans can come watch and he can do things they can appreciate [...], but aside from that, you take his work rate and his defensive pressing and those type of elements and he’s a handful." Despite not being a prolific goal scorer, he held an eye for goal from midfield, often succeeding on chipped shots from distance. He was also known to show frequent dissent toward referees, which at times led to a steady accumulation of yellow cards.

== Coaching ==
Higuaín began his coaching career in 2020 when he signed with D.C. United as a player and player development coach. On 4 February 2022, he was named as part of the coaching staff for Inter Miami II ahead of the inaugural MLS Next Pro season. In January 2025, Higuaín accepted the head coach role with Columbus Crew 2. On August 23, 2026, Higuaín received a red card and a two match suspension for "two deliberate acts of physical abuse and sexism towards a female referee", having refused to let go of her hand and saying "don't forget this is a man's game". On September 22, 2026, the Columbus Crew 2 announced Higuaín was dismissed from his coaching duties as he does not meet the standards expected from staff.

== Personal life ==
Higuaín holds a U.S. green card which qualifies him as a domestic player for MLS roster purposes.

== Career statistics ==
As of 8 November 2020

Club	Season	League			Cup (Note: Appearances in the Turkish Cup and U.S. Open Cup)		Continental		Other		Total	
Club	Season	Division	Apps	Goals	Apps	Goals	Apps	Goals	Apps	Goals	Apps	Goals
River Plate	2003–04	Primera División	3	0	–		1 (Note: Appearances in the Copa Libertadores)	0	–		4	0
River Plate	2004–05	Primera División	2	0	–		0	0	–		2	0
River Plate	2005–06	Primera División	0	0	–		–		–		0	0
River Plate	2006–07	Primera División	0	0	–		–		–		0	0
River Plate	Total		5	0	0	0	1	0	0	0	6	0
Nueva Chicago (loan)	2005–06	Primera B Nacional	36	13	–		–		4 (Note: Appearances in the Primera B Nacional Promotion Playoff)	2	40	15
Nueva Chicago (loan)	2006–07	Primera División	35	13	–		–		2 (Note: Appearances in the Primera División Relegation Playoff)	1	37	14
Nueva Chicago (loan)	Total		71	26	0	0	0	0	6	3	77	29
Beşiktaş	2007–08	Süper Lig	9	0	2	2	5 (Note: Appearances in the UEFA Champions League)	0	0	0	16	2
América (loan)	2008	Primera División de México	13	1	–		9	1	–		22	2
Independiente	2008–09	Primera División	18	1	–		1 (Note: Appearance in the Copa Sudamericana)	0	–		19	1
Godoy Cruz	2009–10	Primera División	36	11	–		–		–		36	11
Colón	2010–11	Primera División	27	3	–		–		–		27	3
Colón	2011–12	Primera División	35	7	0	0	–		–		35	7
Colón	Total		62	10	0	0	0	0	0	0	62	10
Columbus Crew	2012	Major League Soccer	13	5	0	0	–		–		13	5
Columbus Crew	2013	Major League Soccer	29	11	2	0	–		–		31	11
Columbus Crew	2014	Major League Soccer	29	11	0	0	–		1 (Note: Appearances in the MLS Cup Playoffs)	1	30	12
Columbus Crew	2015	Major League Soccer	32	8	0	0	–		5	1	37	9
Columbus Crew	2016	Major League Soccer	20	4	0	0	–		–		20	4
Columbus Crew	2017	Major League Soccer	26	9	1	0	–		5	0	32	9
Columbus Crew	2018	Major League Soccer	30	6	0	0	–		3	2	33	8
Columbus Crew	2019	Major League Soccer	14	1	0	0	–		–		14	1
Columbus Crew	Total		193	55	3	0	0	0	14	4	210	59
D.C. United	2020	Major League Soccer	10 (Note: Includes three appearances and two goals in the MLS is Back Tournament)	2	–		–		–		10	2
Inter Miami	2020	Major League Soccer	4	0	–		–		–		4	0
Career total			421	106	5	2	16	1	20	7	462	116

== Honours ==
River Plate

- Argentine Primera División: Clausura 2004

América

- InterLiga: 2008

Individual

- MLS 50/50 Club
- MLS Newcomer of the Year: 2012
- MLS Player of the Week 2012: Week 25, 26
- AT&T Goal of the Week 2013: Week 24
- MLS Player of the Week 2014: Week 11

Sporting positions
Preceded by Chad Marshall	Columbus Crew captain 2013	Succeeded by Michael Parkhurst
