= Danny O'Rourke (soccer) =

American soccer player and coach

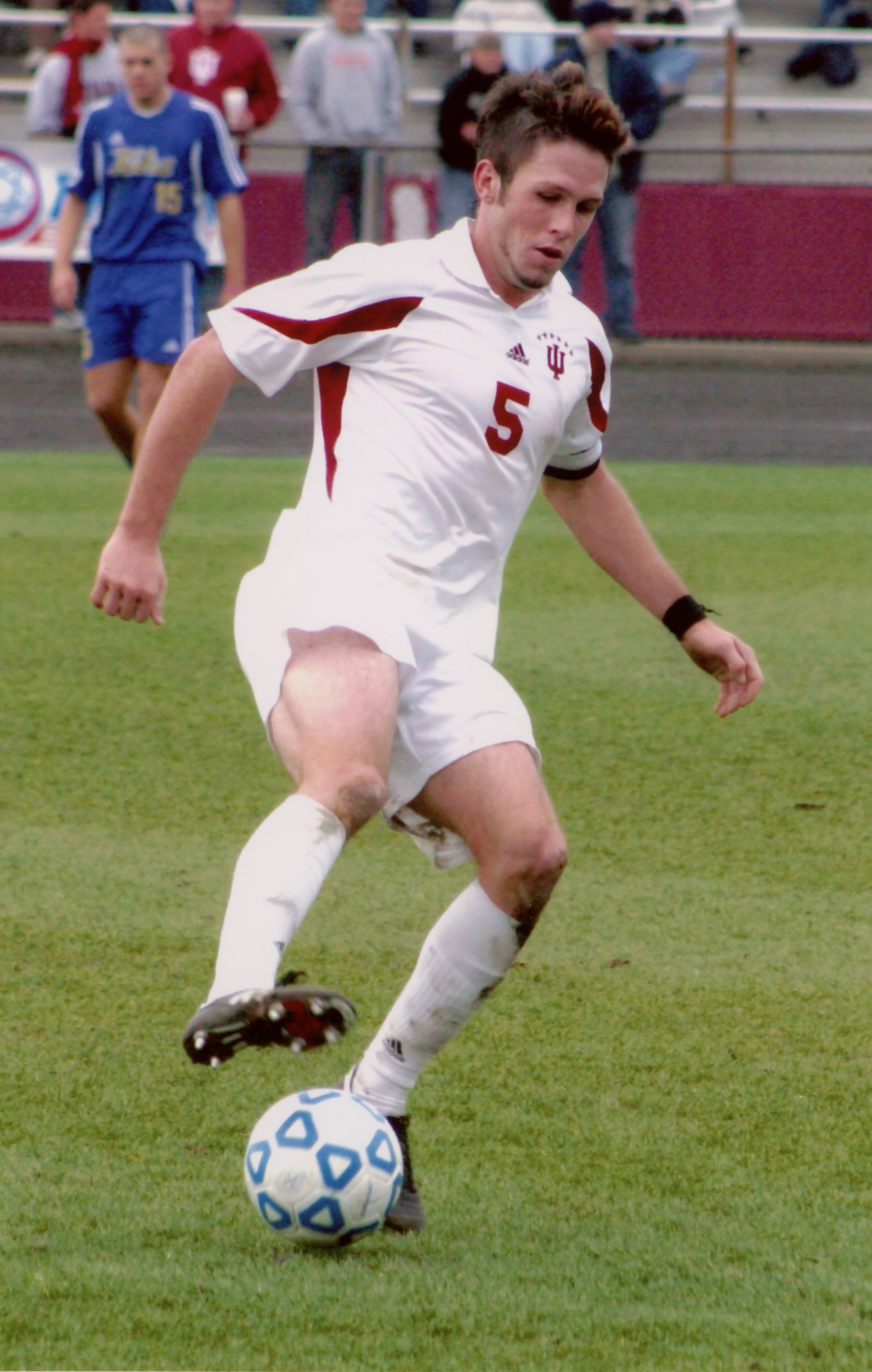
- O'Rourke playing for Indiana

Personal information
- Date of birth: May 31, 1983 (age 43)
- Place of birth: Columbus, Ohio, U.S.
- Height: 6 ft 0 in (1.83 m)
- Position: Defender

College career
Years	Team	Apps	(Gls)
2001–2004	Indiana Hoosiers		

Senior career*
Years	Team	Apps	(Gls)
2000	Dayton Gemini		
2002	Chicago Fire Premier		
2003	Columbus Shooting Stars	7	(0)
2004	Chicago Fire Premier	8	(1)
2005	San Jose Earthquakes	14	(0)
2006	New York Red Bulls	28	(0)
2007–2013	Columbus Crew	147	(0)
2014	Portland Timbers	12	(0)
2015	Portland Timbers 2	0	(0)

Managerial career
- 2018–2021: Indiana Hoosiers (assistant)
- * Club domestic league appearances and goals

Danny O'Rourke (born May 31, 1983) is an American former soccer player who played as a defender.

== Career ==
=== High school and college ===
O'Rourke played high school soccer at Worthington Kilbourne High School in Worthington, Ohio. He was captain during the 2000 season, during which they won the state championship. Named Ohio Capital Conference player of the year, All-Ohio Capital Conference First Team, All-District, and All-State.

O'Rourke played college soccer for Indiana University from 2001 to 2004, starting every game he played in during his four years. Selected as All-Big 10 as a sophomore, junior, and senior, O'Rourke was named a first team All-American his senior season, also winning the Hermann Trophy while leading Indiana to a second consecutive NCAA Championship over UC Santa Barbara. O'Rourke finished his career at Indiana having played in 83 games, registering two goals and five assists. During his collegiate career, O'Rourke played for three teams in the amateur Premier Development League. In 2000, he spent time with the Dayton Gemini. In 2003, he played for the Columbus Shooting Stars and in 2002 and 2004 with the Chicago Fire Premier.

=== Professional ===
O'Rourke was drafted by the San Jose Earthquakes with the fourth overall pick of the 2005 MLS SuperDraft. He began the year as a starter before losing his spot to Ricardo Clark. Along with the rest of his Earthquakes teammates, he moved to Houston for the 2006 season, but was traded to New York Red Bulls for Adrian Serioux a week before the season started.

O'Rourke was selected in the 2006 MLS Expansion Draft by Toronto FC, but was almost immediately traded to the Columbus Crew along with William Hesmer for a partial allocation.

In his first years playing for MLS, he was considered one of the bright young prospects at midfield. In 2008, he shifted to center back. Since 2009, O'Rourke has played a mix of midfield and defender positions.

O'Rourke re-signed with Columbus for the 2013 season on December 17, 2012.

O'Rourke signed with the Portland Timbers on May 27, 2014.

== Personal ==
Danny's father, Dan O'Rourke, played football at Colorado State University and professionally in the NFL for the Houston Oilers.

== Honors ==
Columbus Crew

- Major League Soccer MLS Cup: 2008
- Major League Soccer Supporter's Shield: 2008, 2009

Indiana University

- NCAA Men's Division I Soccer Championship: 2003, 2004

Individual

- Hermann Trophy: 2004
- NCAA Division I First-Team All-America: 2004
