= Gláuber (footballer, born 1983) =

Brazilian footballer

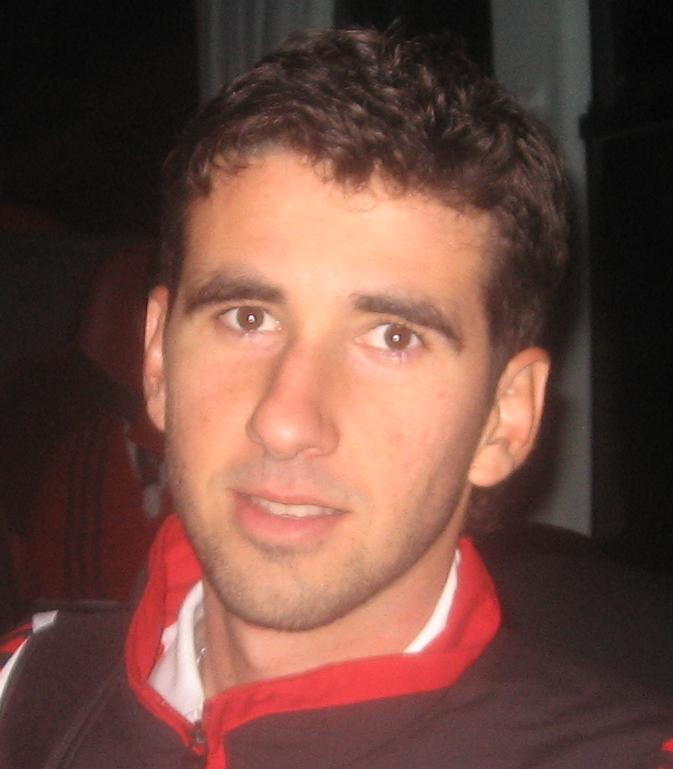
- Gláuber in 2007

Personal information
- Full name: Gláuber Leandro Honorato Berti
- Date of birth: 5 August 1983 (age 43)
- Place of birth: São José do Rio Preto, Brazil
- Height: 1.91 m (6 ft 3 in)
- Position: Centre back

Senior career*
Years	Team	Apps	(Gls)
2000–2003	Atlético Mineiro	39	(2)
2003–2006	Palmeiras	14	(0)
2006	→ 1. FC Nürnberg (loan)	12	(0)
2005–2008	1. FC Nürnberg	39	(0)
2008–2009	Manchester City	1	(0)
2009–2010	São Caetano	6	(0)
2010–2013	Rapid București	46	(1)
2013	Columbus Crew	13	(1)
Total		170	(4)

International career
2005	Brazil	1	(0)
- * Club domestic league appearances and goals

Gláuber Leandro Honorato Berti (born 5 August 1983), more commonly known as Gláuber, is a Brazilian former professional footballer who played as a centre back.

== Club career ==
=== Early career ===
Born in São José do Rio Preto, São Paulo, Gláuber began his footballing career with Belo Horizonte-based club Atlético Mineiro before joining Palmeiras in São Paulo, where he saw top-flight football for the first time in 2003. After an eighteen-month stint with the Verdão he was transferred in December 2005 to 1. FC Nürnberg on a six-month loan with a buying option for the Bundesliga club. Gláuber quickly became a starter for the team for the remainder of the season.

Thus, Nürnberg exercised their right to acquire Gláuber in the summer of 2006. Shortly before the deal was finalized, his Italian ancestry helped him in acquiring Italian citizenship, which means he no longer counted against the team's contingent of non-UEFA-players.

=== Manchester City ===
On 31 August 2008, Gláuber signed a one-year deal with Premier League club Manchester City for an undisclosed fee. Even though he did not appear for the first team, the City fanbase referred to the substitutes bench sometimes as "The Berti" in his honour. On 24 May 2009, the last day of the 2008–09 season, he finally made his début for Manchester City, at the City of Manchester Stadium. After being an unused substitute 20 times, he came on in the 84th minute for left back Wayne Bridge against Bolton Wanderers. He was cheered every time he touched the ball by Manchester City fans, got a mini-standing ovation when he took a throw-in and was voted Man of the Match on the BBC Sport Online website, with an average rating of 8.67 out of 10. Manager Mark Hughes commented after the match: "He got a really great reception! I've not been able to give him the opportunities that maybe I would have liked, but I thought that today was a chance to do that. It was important to do it not only for the fans but also for the squad, because they were all keen that he got an opportunity to get on the field in a sky blue shirt. I must be going soft in my old age!"

He was released by Manchester City at the end of the season, having made just the single appearance. In 2011, Bleacher Report named him one of Manchester City's "Top 10 Cult Heroes of All Time" and in October 2015 Gláuber gave an interview, speaking fondly about his time at Man City. He said "That 10 minutes [of the game against Bolton] were wonderful because every time I touched the ball the fans shouted my name. It was a really nice thing. It became a bit funny because the more I wanted to play, the more the fans wanted to see me play... I gave my best all of my time there. Those who shared the dressing room with me know about my dedication in training and they know how much I fought for that opportunity. Unfortunately it came on the last day, but even so, it was still a wonderful time in my career at City because it helped me to grow as a person as well."

=== Later career ===
In his third appearance with the Columbus Crew he scored his first goal for the team in the 68th minute during the home opener one 16 March 2013. On 13 June, he suffered a ruptured left anterior cruciate ligament in the 6th minute of a U.S. Open Cup match vs. Chicago Fire. He subsequently underwent arthroscopic knee surgery and was placed on the injured list for the remainder of the year.

On 22 November 2013, Gláuber's contract option was declined by the Columbus Crew. He subsequently retired from football and returned to Brazil, where he runs his own business.

== International career ==
Gláuber has been capped once for the Brazil national team, appearing in a friendly against Guatemala on 27 April 2005.

== Honours ==
1. FC Nürnberg

- DFB-Pokal: 2006–07
