= 2021 Philadelphia Union season =

Philadelphia Union
2021 season
- Owner: Keystone Sports & Entertainment
- Head coach: Jim Curtin
- Stadium: Subaru Park (Capacity: 18,500)
- MLS: Conference: 2nd Overall: 6th
- MLS Cup Playoffs: Conference Finals
- U.S. Open Cup: Cancelled
- CONCACAF Champions League: Semi-finals
- Top goalscorer: League: Kacper Przybyłko (12); All: Kacper Przybyłko (17)
- Highest home attendance: 16,827 (July 17 vs. DC United)
- Lowest home attendance: 4,625 (April 14 vs. Saprissa)
- Average home league attendance: 12,239
- Biggest win: 4–0 (April 14 vs. Saprissa)
- Biggest defeat: 0–2 (May 1 vs. New York City FC); 1–3 (August 28 vs. DC United)
Home colors	Away colors

The 2021 Philadelphia Union season was the club's twelfth season in Major League Soccer, the top flight of American soccer. The team is managed by Jim Curtin, his eighth season with the club. The club's regular season began on April 7, 2021, with the CONCACAF Champions League, and then on April 17, 2021, with MLS play, and ended on November 7, 2021, a month-delayed start due to the COVID-19 pandemic. Outside of MLS, the Union, by winning the 2020 Supporters' Shield, is competing in their first ever CONCACAF Champions League.

== Background ==
The 2021 preseason saw turnover in the coaching positions as assistant coach Oka Nikolov departed and replaced by Frank Leicht.

The transfer window was the Union's most lucrative to date selling two MLS Best XI players. Brenden Aaronson was officially transferred to Red Bull Salzburg in the Austrian Bundesliga for a reported fee of $6 million, with a potential $3 million more in performance bonuses; the highest ever transfer fee for a U.S.-based homegrown player. In January, Mark McKenzie was transferred to K.R.C. Genk for a reported fee of $6 million, plus additional performance-based bonuses.

Prior to the start of the season, long-time defender, Raymon Gaddis, announced his retirement from professional soccer. The full-back spent his entire professional career with the Union, holding record in games played (221) and minutes played (18,702).

The Union traded away or passed on all picks for the 2021 MLS SuperDraft, being the third consecutive season doing so. Supplementing young players via the Union's academy, five academy players were signed to the senior team: defender Nathan Harriel, midfielder Jack McGlynn, midfielder Paxten Aaronson, defender Brandan Craig, and midfielder/forward Quinn Sullivan.

Rounding out the first team acquisitions included centerback, Stuart Findlay, from Kilmarnock FC and midfielder, Leon Flach, from FC St. Pauli.

== 2021 roster ==
As of September 25, 2021

Note: Flags indicate national team as defined under FIFA eligibility rules; some limited exceptions apply. Players may hold more than one non-FIFA nationality.

No.	Pos.	Nation	Player
1	GK	USA	Matt Freese (HGP)
2	DF	USA	Matthew Real (HGP)
3	DF	ENG	Jack Elliott
4	DF	SCO	Stuart Findlay
5	DF	NOR	Jakob Glesnes
6	MF	HUN	Daniel Gazdag
7	FW	BRA	Matheus Davó (on loan from Corinthians)
8	MF	VEN	José Martínez
10	MF	CPV	Jamiro Monteiro (DP)
11	MF	USA	Alejandro Bedoya (Captain)
12	GK	USA	Joe Bendik
13	MF	USA	Cole Turner (HGP)
15	DF	CMR	Olivier Mbaizo
16	MF	USA	Jack McGlynn (HGP)
17	FW	BRA	Sergio Santos

No.	Pos.	Nation	Player
18	GK	JAM	Andre Blake (GA)
19	FW	JAM	Cory Burke
20	MF	VEN	Jesús Bueno
21	MF	USA	Anthony Fontana (HGP)
23	FW	POL	Kacper Przybyłko
25	MF	BRA	Ilsinho
26	DF	USA	Nathan Harriel (HGP)
27	DF	GER	Kai Wagner
29	DF	JAM	Alvas Powell
30	MF	USA	Paxten Aaronson (HGP)
31	MF	USA	Leon Flach
33	MF	USA	Quinn Sullivan (HGP)
34	MF	USA	Brandan Craig (HGP)
78	DF	FRA	Aurelien Collin

=== Out on loan ===
Note: Flags indicate national team as defined under FIFA eligibility rules; some limited exceptions apply. Players may hold more than one non-FIFA nationality.

No.	Pos.	Nation	Player
14	MF	USA	Jack de Vries (on loan with Venezia F.C.)
24	MF	SVK	Matej Oravec (on loan with FK Železiarne Podbrezová)

== Transfers ==
=== In ===
Date	No.	Pos.	Player	Transferred from	Fee/notes	Source
January 1, 2021	26	DF	(United States) Nathan Harriel	(United States) Philadelphia Union II	Homegrown signing	
January 1, 2021	16	MF	(United States) Jack McGlynn	(United States) Philadelphia Union II	Homegrown signing	
January 1, 2021	30	MF	(United States) Paxten Aaronson	(United States) Philadelphia Union II	Homegrown signing	
January 1, 2021	34	MF	(United States) Brandan Craig	(United States) Philadelphia Union II	Homegrown signing	
January 1, 2021	33	MF	(United States) Quinn Sullivan	(United States) Philadelphia Union II	Homegrown signing	
February 25, 2021	4	DF	(Scotland) Stuart Findlay	(Scotland) Kilmarnock	Undisclosed fee	
March 31, 2021	31	MF	(United States) Leon Flach	(Germany) St. Pauli	Undisclosed fee	
April 2, 2021	22	GK	(Trinidad and Tobago) Greg Ranjitsingh	(United States) Minnesota United FC	Free Transfer	
May 11, 2021	6	MF	(Hungary) Daniel Gazdag	(Hungary) Budapest Honvéd FC	Undisclosed fee	
June 10, 2021	29	DF	(Jamaica) Alvas Powell	(Sudan) Al-Hilal Club	Free agent	
July 29, 2021	20	MF	(Venezuela) Jesús Bueno	(Venezuela) Deportivo Lara	Undisclosed fee	

=== Out ===
Date	No.	Pos.	Player	Transferred to	Fee/notes	Source
December 2, 2020	2	MF	(Guyana) Warren Creavalle		Declined Contract Option	
December 2, 2020	7	FW	(United States) Andrew Wooten	(Austria) Admira	Declined Contract Option	
December 2, 2020	20	FW	(Democratic Republic of the Congo) Michee Ngalina	(United States) Colorado Springs Switchbacks	Declined Contract Option	
January 1, 2021	22	MF	(United States) Brenden Aaronson	(Austria) Red Bull Salzburg	$6,000,000 - $9,000,000	
January 7, 2021	4	DF	(United States) Mark McKenzie	(Belgium) Genk	$6,000,000	
March 4, 2021	28	DF	(United States) Ray Gaddis		Player Retirement	
August 2021	22	GK	(Trinidad and Tobago) Greg Ranjitsingh	(United States) MLS Pool	Released	

=== Loan In ===
Date	No.	Pos.	Player	Loaned from	Fee/notes	Source
August 11, 2021	7	FW	(Brazil) Matheus Davó	(Brazil) Corinthians	Loan with option to purchase	

=== Loan Out ===
Date	No.	Pos.	Player	Transferred to	Fee/notes	Source
April 21, 2021	24	MF	(Slovakia) Matej Oravec	(United States) Philadelphia Union II	Loaned Out	
July 13, 2021	24	MF	(Slovakia) Matej Oravec	(Slovakia) FK Železiarne Podbrezová	Loaned Out	
August 31, 2021	14	MF	(United States) Jack de Vries	(Italy) Venezia F.C.	Loaned Out	

== Competitions ==
=== Preseason ===
March 15 Preseason 1	Philadelphia Union	0–1	Orlando City SC	Clearwater, Florida
11:00 am		PHI report MLS report	Alvarado 61'	Stadium: Joe DiMaggio Sports Complex

March 20 Preseason 2	Philadelphia Union	0–1	Chicago Fire FC	Clearwater, Florida
3:00 pm	Martínez (yellow card) 8'; Fontana (yellow card) 31'; Wagner (yellow card) 61'		Kappelhof (yellow card) 37'; Gutiérrez (yellow card) 40'; Casas 100' (Frankowski)	Stadium: Joe DiMaggio Sports Complex
Note: Additional 25-minute period after the full 90 minutes.

March 24 Preseason 3	Orlando City SC	3–1	Philadelphia Union	Kissimmee, Florida
12:30 pm	Pato 28'; Mueller 35'; Aiás 63'	MLS Report	Aaronson 79'	Stadium: Osceola County Stadium

March 31 Preseason 4	Philadelphia Union	2–0	D.C. United	Chester, Pennsylvania
3:00 pm	Fontana 3', 37'; Bedoya (yellow card) 74'	PHI Report	Moreno (yellow card) 67'	Stadium: Subaru Park

July 29 Preseason 5	Philadelphia Union	Cancelled	Wrexham A.F.C.	Chester, Pennsylvania
		Report		Stadium: Subaru Park
Note: Match Cancelled due to the COVID-19 pandemic

=== Major League Soccer ===
==== Standings ====
===== Eastern Conference =====
Pos	Team	Pld	W	L	T	GF	GA	GD	Pts	Qualification
1	New England Revolution	34	22	5	7	65	41	+24	73	Qualification for the playoffs conference semifinals and CONCACAF Champions League
2	Philadelphia Union	34	14	8	12	48	35	+13	54	Qualification for the playoffs first round
3	Nashville SC	34	12	4	18	55	33	+22	54	Qualification for the playoffs first round
4	New York City FC (C)	34	14	11	9	56	36	+20	51	Qualification for the playoffs first round and CONCACAF Champions League (Note: As MLS Cup 2021 champions)
5	Atlanta United FC	34	13	9	12	45	37	+8	51	Qualification for the playoffs first round

Source: MLS
Rules for classification: 1) points; 2) total wins; 3) total goal differential; 4) total goals scored; 5) fewer disciplinary points; 6) away goal differential; 7) away goals scored; 8) home goals differential; 9) home goals scored; 10) coin toss (2 clubs tied) or drawing of lots (≥3 clubs tied)
(C) Champions

===== Overall table =====
Pos	Team	Pld	W	L	T	GF	GA	GD	Pts	Qualification
4	Sporting Kansas City	34	17	10	7	58	40	+18	58	
5	Portland Timbers	34	17	13	4	56	52	+4	55	
6	Philadelphia Union	34	14	8	12	48	35	+13	54	
7	Nashville SC	34	12	4	18	55	33	+22	54	
8	New York City FC (C)	34	14	11	9	56	36	+20	51	Qualification for the 2022 CONCACAF Champions League (Note: As MLS Cup 2021 champions (USA1))

Source: MLS
Rules for classification: 1) points; 2) total wins; 3) total goal differential; 4) total goals scored; 5) fewer disciplinary points; 6) away goal differential; 7) away goals scored; 8) home goals differential; 9) home goals scored; 10) coin toss (2 clubs tied) or drawing of lots (≥3 clubs tied)
(C) Champions

==== Results summary ====
Overall								Home						Away					
Pld	Pts	W	L	T	GF	GA	GD	W	L	T	GF	GA	GD	W	L	T	GF	GA	GD
34	54	14	8	12	48	35	+13	11	3	3	25	10	+15	3	5	9	23	25	−2

Source: Philadelphia Union Schedule
Pld = Matches played; Pts = Points; W = Matches won; T = Matches tied; L = Matches lost; GF = Goals for; GA = Goals against; GD = Goal difference

==== Results by round ====
Round	1	2	3	4	5	6	7	8	9	10	11	12	13	14	15	16	17	18	19	20	21	22	23	24	25	26	27	28	29	30	31	32	33	34
Stadium	A	H	H	A	H	H	A	H	A	H	A	A	A	H	A	A	H	H	A	A	H	H	A	H	H	H	A	H	A	A	H	A	H	A
Result	D	L	L	W	D	W	W	W	D	W	D	L	D	W	L	D	D	W	L	W	D	L	L	W	W	D	W	W	D	L	W	D	W	D

Source: Philadelphia Union Schedule
A = Away; H = Home; W = Win; D = Draw; L = Loss

==== Results ====
April 18 1	Columbus Crew SC	0–0	Philadelphia Union	Columbus, Ohio
5:30 PM EDT	Díaz (yellow card) 56'; Kitchen (yellow card) 64'	Report	Glesnes (yellow card) 40'; Monteiro (yellow card) 61'; Santos (yellow card) 75'; Bedoya (yellow card) 89'	Stadium: Historic Crew Stadium; Attendance: 5,180; Referee: Ramy Touchan

April 24 2	Philadelphia Union	1–2	Inter Miami CF	Chester, Pennsylvania
8:00 PM EDT	Martínez (yellow card) 48'; Monteiro 54'	Report	Matuidi (yellow card) 30'; G. Higuaín 73'; F. Higuaín 83'	Stadium: Subaru Park; Attendance: 5,000; Referee: Alex Chilowicz

May 1 3	Philadelphia Union	0–2	New York City FC	Chester, Pennsylvania
7:30 PM EDT	Martínez (red card) 16'; Monteiro (yellow card) 38'	Report	Medina 5'; Morales (yellow card) 18'; Ibeagha (yellow card) 25'; Moralez (yellow card) 45+2'; Castellanos 65'	Stadium: Subaru Park; Referee: Ismail Elfath

May 8 4	Chicago Fire SC	0–2	Philadelphia Union	Chicago, Illinois
1:00 PM EDT	Kappelhof (yellow card) 26'; Omsberg (yellow card) 48'; Sekulic (yellow card) 90+2'	Report	Burke 51'; Glesnes 60' (yellow card) 90+7'; Santos (yellow card) 90+2'; Bedoya (yellow card) 90+7'	Stadium: Soldier Field; Attendance: 6,457; Referee: Marcos de Oliveira

May 12 5	Philadelphia Union	1–1	New England Revolution	Chester, Pennsylvania
7:30 PM EDT	Wagner (yellow card) 34'; Monteiro (yellow card) 53'; Przybylko (yellow card) 71' (goal) 88'	Report	Bunbury 85'; Bye (yellow card) 90+1'	Stadium: Subaru Park; Attendance: 5,000; Referee: Tori Penso

May 15 6	Philadelphia Union	1–0	New York Red Bulls	Chester, Pennsylvania
7:30PM EDT	Burke 7'; Flach (yellow card) 90+3'	Report	Nealis (yellow card) 61'; Yearwood (yellow card) 79' (yellow-red card) 90+2'	Stadium: Subaru Park; Attendance: 5,000; Referee: Allen Chapman

May 23 7	D.C. United	0–1	Philadelphia Union	Washington, D.C.
7:00 PM EDT		Report	Przybyłko 45+1'; Martínez (yellow card) 65'; Blake (yellow card) 90+5'	Stadium: Audi Field; Attendance: 6,200; Referee: Tim Ford

May 30 8	Philadelphia Union	3–0	Portland Timbers	Chester, Pennsylvania
7:30 PM EDT	Mbaizo (yellow card) 5'; Przybyłko 26'; Santos 31'; Elliott 63'	Report	Župarić (yellow card) 62'; Bravo (yellow card) 72'	Stadium: Subaru Park; Attendance: 6,635; Referee: Robert Sibigia

June 20 9	Atlanta United FC	2–2	Philadelphia Union	Atlanta, Georgia
2:00 PM EDT	Przybylko 58' (o.g.); López (yellow card) 76'; Walkes 83'	Report	Bedoya (yellow card) 30'; Flach (yellow card) 41'; Fontana (yellow card) 53'; Glesnes (yellow card) 60' (goal) 90+7'; Burke 84'	Stadium: Mercedes-Benz Stadium; Attendance: 42,523; Referee: Ted Unkel

June 23 10	Philadelphia Union	1–0	Columbus Crew	Chester, PA
7:30 PM EDT	Monteiro 24'; Real (yellow card) 74'; Flach (yellow card) 84'	Report	Mățan (yellow card) 43'; Wormgoor (yellow card) 51'	Stadium: Subaru Park; Attendance: 16,234; Referee: Joseph Dickerson

June 26 11	Chicago Fire FC	3–3	Philadelphia Union	Chicago, Illinois
8:00 PM EDT	Glesnes 2' (own goal); Stojanović (yellow card) 44'; Sekulić 56'; Navarro (yellow card) 62'; Pineda 67'; Herbers (yellow card) 81'	Report	Jack Elliott (footballer) (yellow card) 10'; Sullivan 28'; Santos (yellow card) 34'; Burke 45+2'; Wagner (yellow card) 52'; Powell (yellow card) 55'; Sekulić 79' (own goal)	Stadium: Soldier Field; Attendance: 7,308; Referee: Fotis Bazakos

July 5 12	Nashville SC	1–0	Philadelphia Union	Nashville, Tennessee
8:00 PM EDT	Sapong 2'	Report	Martínez (yellow card) 79'	Stadium: Nissan Stadium; Attendance: 21,822; Referee: Robert Sibiga

July 8 13	New York Red Bulls	1–1	Philadelphia Union	Harrison, New Jersey
8:30 PM EDT	Yearwood (yellow card) 45 +2'; Klimala 60' (pen.)	Report	Mbaizo (yellow card) 42'; Freese (red card) 57'; Santos 85'; Monteiro (yellow card) 90 +7'	Stadium: Red Bull Arena; Attendance: 9,477; Referee: Victor Rivas
Note: The match was originally scheduled to start at 8:00 PM ET, however it was delayed by a half-hour due to inclement weather.

July 17 14	Philadelphia Union	2–1	D.C. United	Chester, Pennsylvania
7:30 PM EDT	Santos 10'; Martínez (yellow card) 22'; Przybyłko 83'	Report	Asad (yellow card) 27' (goal) 51' (pen.); Reyna (yellow card) 45+1'	Stadium: Subaru Park; Attendance: 16,821; Referee: Alex Chilowicz
Note: The match was suspended before 9:30 PM ET at the 87th minute due to inclement weather. The match later resumed at 11:20 PM ET.

July 22 15	Orlando City SC	2–1	Philadelphia Union	Orlando, Florida
7:30 PM EDT	Michel 10', (yellow card) 77'; Pereyra (yellow card) 45'; Perea 59'	Report	Santos (yellow card) 56'; Przybyłko 68'	Stadium: Exploria Stadium; Attendance: 15,432; Referee: Alan Kelly

July 25 16	Inter Miami CF	1–1	Philadelphia Union	Fort Lauderdale, Florida
7:30 PM EDT	Robinson 71'	Report	Mbaizo (yellow card) 56'; Przybyłko 85'	Stadium: Inter Miami CF Stadium; Attendance: 14,057; Referee: Joseph Dickerson

August 1 17	Philadelphia Union	1–1	Chicago Fire FC	Chester, Pennsylvania
6:00 PM EDT	Glesnes (yellow card) 30'; Wagner 36'; Elliott (yellow card) 65'	Report	Frankowski 10'; Omsberg (red card) 34'; Herbers (yellow card) 41'; Berič (yellow card) 78'	Stadium: Subaru Park; Attendance: 16,677; Referee: Michael Radchuk

August 4 18	Philadelphia Union	3–0	Toronto FC	Chester, Pennsylvania
7:30 PM EDT	Glesnes 12', (yellow card) 26'; Gazdag 33' (pen.); Santos 36'; Wagner (yellow card) 47'; Mbaizo (yellow card) 90'	Report	Soteldo (penalty missed) 53'	Stadium: Subaru Park; Attendance: 14,303; Referee: Ted Unkel

August 8 19	New England Revolution	2–1	Philadelphia Union	Foxborough, Massachusetts
6:00 PM EDT	Polster 10'; Bou (penalty missed) 39', 39'; McNamara (yellow card) 69'; Bunbury (yellow card) 90+3'	Report	Mbaizo (yellow card) 22'; Aaronson 31'; Elliott (yellow card) 54'; Wagner (yellow card) 84'	Stadium: Gillette Stadium; Attendance: 17,054; Referee: Armando Villarreal

August 18 20	Philadelphia Union	1–0	New York City FC	Chester, Pennsylvania
7:30 PM EDT	Bedoya 67'; Elliott (yellow card) 78'	Report	Medina (yellow card) 25'; Sands (yellow card) 36'	Stadium: Subaru Park; Attendance: 15,263; Referee: Drew Fischer

August 21 21	Philadelphia Union	1–1	CF Montréal	Chester, Pennsylvania
7:30 PM EDT	Mbaizo (yellow card) 3'; Monteiro (yellow card) 6'; Sullivan 87'	Report	Choinière (yellow card) 44'; Mihailovic 45+1'; Miller (yellow card) 68'; Breza (yellow card) 90+4'; Kizza (yellow card) 90+5'	Stadium: Subaru Park; Attendance: 14,794; Referee: Chris Penso

August 28 22	D.C. United	3–1	Philadelphia Union	Washington, D.C.
8:00 PM EDT	Kamara 36' (pen.); Reyna 49'; Najar (yellow card) 55'; Ábila 90+5'	Report	Birnbaum 22' (o.g.); Elliott (yellow card) 52'	Stadium: Audi Field; Attendance: 16,593; Referee: Rubiel Vazquez

September 3 23	Philadelphia Union	0–1	New England Revolution	Chester, Pennsylvania
7:30 PM EDT	Harriel (yellow card) 33'; Bedoya (yellow card) 71'; Sullivan (yellow card) 77'; Fontana (yellow card) 80'; Aaronson (yellow card) 89'	Report	Polster 33'; Traustason (yellow card) 55' (yellow-red card) 59'; Kessler (yellow card) 90+3'	Stadium: Subaru Park; Attendance: 15,152; Referee: Jair Marrufo

September 19 24	Philadelphia Union	3–1	Orlando City SC	Chester, Pennsylvania
4:00 PM EDT	Wagner 37'; Flach (yellow card) 53'; Przybyłko 61', 89' (pen.)	Report	Schlegel (yellow card) 33'; Ruan 57', (yellow card) 59'; Michel (yellow card) 75'; Gallese (yellow card) 80'; Jansson (yellow card) 80'; Aguilera (yellow card) 86'; Carlos (red card) 88'	Stadium: Subaru Park; Attendance: 15,032; Referee: Alan Kelly

September 25 25	Philadelphia Union	1–0	Atlanta United FC	Chester, Pennsylvania
3:30 PM EDT	Martínez (yellow card) 39'; Przybyłko 71'	Report	Moreno (yellow card) 31'	Stadium: Subaru Park; Referee: Robert Sibiga

September 29 26	New York Red Bulls	1–1	Philadelphia Union	Harrison, New Jersey
7:30 PM EDT	Fernandez 37'; Duncan (yellow card) 52'; Reyes (yellow card) 65'	Report	Santos 17'; Martínez (yellow card) 45'; Wagner (yellow card) 85'; Blake (yellow card) 86'; Elliott (yellow card) 88'	Stadium: Red Bull Arena; Attendance: 9,193; Referee: Alex Chilowicz

October 3 27	Philadelphia Union	3–0	Columbus Crew SC	Chester, Pennsylvania
7:30 PM EDT	Elliott 25'; Wagner (yellow card) 35' (yellow-red card) 64'; Bedoya 46'; Powell (yellow card) 74'; Santos (yellow card) 78'; Flach 89'	Report	Santos (yellow card) 66', (penalty missed) 76'	Stadium: Subaru Park; Attendance: 15,578; Referee: Victor Rivas

October 9 28	FC Cincinnati	1–2	Philadelphia Union	Cincinnati, Ohio
8:00 PM EDT	Castillo (yellow card) 68'; Medunjanin 82'	Report	Przybyłko 45+3'; Aaronson 56'; Freese (yellow card) 80'	Stadium: TQL Stadium; Attendance: 21,674; Referee: Lukasz Szpala

October 16 29	CF Montréal	2–2	Philadelphia Union	TBC
1:00 PM EDT	Miljevic 33'; Mihailovic (yellow card) 44'; Waterman (yellow card) 75'; Ibrahim 90+5'	Report	Pantemis 63' (o.g.); Wagner 77'	Stadium: TBC; Referee: Pierre-Luc Lauziere

October 20 30	Minnesota United FC	3–2	Philadelphia Union	Saint Paul, Minnesota
8:00 PM EDT	Hunou 41'; Lod 63'; Fragapane 67'; Métanire (red card) 77'; Reynoso (yellow card) 83'	Report	Mbaizo (yellow card) 5'; Gazdag 45', 54'; Wagner (yellow card) 78'	Stadium: Allianz Field; Referee: Allen Chapman

October 23 31	Philadelphia Union	1–0	Nashville SC	Chester, Pennsylvania
7:30 PM EDT	Przybyłko 18' (pen.), (yellow card) 27'; Glesnes (yellow card) 55'; Monteiro (yellow card) 62'	Report	Loba (yellow card) 23'; Godoy (yellow card) 53'; Nealis (yellow card) 90+2'	Stadium: Subaru Park; Attendance: 18,575; Referee: Armando Villarreal

October 27 32	Toronto FC	2–2	Philadelphia Union	Toronto, Ontario
7:30 PM EDT	Mavinga (yellow card) 57'; Altidore 66'; Elliott 70' (o.g.)	Report	Bedoya 1'; Santos 77'; Martínez (yellow card) 87'	Stadium: BMO Field; Attendance: 5,026; Referee: Silviu Petrescu

October 31 33	Philadelphia Union	2–0	FC Cincinnati	Chester, Pennsylvania
7:30 PM EDT	Gazdag 11'; Aaronson 53'	Report		Stadium: Subaru Park; Attendance: 13,488; Referee: Fotis Bazakos

November 7 34	New York City FC	1–1	Philadelphia Union	New York City, New York
3:30 PM EST	Zelalem (red card) 21'; Castellanos 53'; Medina (yellow card) 82'	Report	Glesnes (yellow card) 25'; Przybyłko 26'; Wagner (yellow card) 31'; Martínez (yellow card) 50'; Bedoya (yellow card) 85'	Stadium: Yankee Stadium; Referee: Armando Villarreal

===== MLS Cup Playoffs =====
November 20 First round	Philadelphia Union	1–0 (a.e.t.)	New York Red Bulls	Chester, Pennsylvania
1:30PM EST	Martínez (yellow card) 74'; Glesnes 120+3'	Report	Yearwood (yellow card) 15'; Gutman (yellow card) 51'; Edwards (yellow card) 52'; Reyes (yellow card) 79'	Stadium: Subaru Park; Attendance: 18,623; Referee: Fotis Bazakos

November 28 Eastern Conference Semifinal	Philadelphia Union	1–1 (a.e.t.) (2–0 p)	Nashville SC	Chester, Pennsylvania
TBD	Gazdag 45+2'	Report	Mukhtar 38'	Stadium: Subaru Park; Attendance: 19,076; Referee: Allen Chapman
	Penalties
	Elliott (penalty scored); Santos (penalty missed); McGlynn (penalty scored)		(penalty missed) Mukhtar; (penalty missed) Godoy; (penalty missed) Muyl; (penalty missed) Zimmerman
Note: Philadelphia advance on penalties 2–0

December 5 Eastern Conference Final	Philadelphia Union	1–2	New York City FC	Chester, Pennsylvania
3:00PM EST	Callens 63' (o.g.); Monteiro (yellow card) 71'; Mbaizo (yellow card) 75'	Report	Moralez (yellow card) 41', (goal) 65'; Magno 88'	Stadium: Subaru Park; Attendance: 19,487; Referee: Ted Unkel

=== U.S. Open Cup ===
On April 16, 2021, the U.S. Soccer Open Cup Committee announced that the planned 16-team 2021 U.S. Open Cup would no longer be held in the spring due to the COVID-19 pandemic. The committee will re-evaluate the possibility of conducting the tournament in some fashion later in the year.

=== CONCACAF Champions League ===
==== Round of 16 ====
April 7 First leg	Saprissa (Costa Rica)	0–1	(United States) Philadelphia Union	San José, Costa Rica
6:00 PM EST	Blanco (yellow card) 90+5'; Barrantes (yellow card) 90+9'; Colindres (yellow card) 90+9'	Report	Przybyłko 34'; Real (yellow card) 75'; Glesnes (yellow card) 90+9'; Monteiro (yellow card) 90+9'	Stadium: Estadio Ricardo Saprissa; Attendance: 0 Referee: Ismael Cornejo (El Salvador)

April 14 Second leg	Philadelphia Union (United States)	4–0 (5–0 agg.)	(Costa Rica) Saprissa	Chester, United States
8:00 PM EST	Monteiro 47' (pen.), 90'; Martínez (yellow card) 48'; Przybyłko 51'; Fontana 54'	Report	Lester (yellow card) 35'	Stadium: Subaru Park; Attendance: 4,625; Referee: Fernando Guerrero (Mexico)

==== Quarter-finals ====
April 27 First leg	Atlanta United FC (United States)	0–3	(United States) Philadelphia Union	Atlanta, United States
8:00 PM EST	Hyndman (yellow card) 48'	Report	Martínez (yellow card) 7'; Przybyłko 57', 73'; Fontana 86'	Stadium: Mercedes-Benz Stadium; Attendance: 17,533; Referee: Jair Marrufo (United States)

May 4 Second leg	Philadelphia Union (United States)	1–1 (4–1 agg.)	(United States) Atlanta United FC	Chester, United States
8:00 PM EST	Elliott (yellow card) 43'; Monteiro (yellow card) 51'; Mbaizo (yellow card) 74'; Real (yellow card) 80'; Przybyłko 88'	Report	Sosa 45+2'; Moreno (yellow card) 61'	Stadium: Subaru Park; Referee: Armando Villarreal (United States)

==== Semi-finals ====
August 12 First leg	Club América (Mexico)	2–0	(United States) Philadelphia Union	Mexico City, Mexico
8:00 PM EST	R. Sánchez 17'; Aguilera 80' (pen.)	Report	Martínez (yellow card) 34'	Stadium: Estadio Azteca; Referee: Walter López (Guatemala)

September 15 Second leg	Philadelphia Union (United States)	0–2 (4–0 agg.)	(Mexico) Club América	Chester, United States
9:00 PM EST	Glesnes (yellow card) 19'; Bedoya (yellow card) 27'; Wagner (yellow card) 27'; Martínez (yellow card) 27'; Monteiro (yellow card) 45+2', (penalty missed) 50'	Report	Córdova (yellow card) 31'; Bruno Valdez (yellow card) 49'; Sánchez (yellow card) 72'; Benedetti 79'; Martín 90+3'	Stadium: Subaru Park; Referee: Said Martínez

== Statistics ==
=== Appearances and goals ===
Last updated December 19, 2021

No.	Pos	Nat	Player	Total		MLS		Champions League		MLS Cup Playoffs	
No.	Pos	Nat	Player	Apps	Goals	Apps	Goals	Apps	Goals	Apps	Goals
Goalkeepers
1	GK	(United States) USA	Matt Freese	8	0	7	0	0	0	1	0
12	GK	(United States) USA	Joe Bendik	3	0	2+1	0	0	0	0	0
18	GK	(Jamaica) JAM	Andre Blake	36	0	28	0	6	0	2	0
22	GK	(Trinidad and Tobago) TRI	Greg Ranjitsingh	0	0	0	0	0	0	0	0
Defenders
2	DF	(United States) USA	Matthew Real	11	0	1+7	0	0+3	0	0	0
3	DF	(England) ENG	Jack Elliott	41	2	33	2	6	0	2	0
4	DF	(Scotland) SCO	Stuart Findlay	13	0	4+7	0	0+1	0	1	0
5	DF	(Norway) NOR	Jakob Glesnes	42	4	34	3	6	0	2	1
7	FW	(Brazil) BRA	Matheus Davó (Note: Loaned in during the season)	1	0	1	0	0	0	0	0
15	DF	(Cameroon) CMR	Olivier Mbaizo	37	0	28+2	0	6	0	1	0
26	DF	(United States) USA	Nathan Harriel	8	0	2+5	0	0	0	1	0
27	DF	(Germany) GER	Kai Wagner	41	3	31+2	3	6	0	2	0
29	DF	(Jamaica) JAM	Alvas Powell	8	0	4+1	0	0+1	0	2	0
78	DF	(France) FRA	Aurélien Collin	2	0	0	0	0+1	0	1	0
Midfielders
6	MF	(Hungary) HUN	Daniel Gazdag	28	5	17+6	4	1+1	0	3	1
8	MF	(Venezuela) VEN	José Martínez	32	0	23+1	0	5	0	3	0
10	MF	(Cape Verde) CPV	Jamiro Monteiro	34	4	26+1	2	5	2	2	0
11	MF	(United States) USA	Alejandro Bedoya	40	3	30+2	3	6	0	2	0
13	MF	(United States) USA	Cole Turner	0	0	0	0	0	0	0	0
14	MF	(United States) USA	Jack de Vries (Note: Loaned out during the season)	0	0	0	0	0	0	0	0
16	MF	(United States) USA	Jack McGlynn	25	0	7+12	0	0+3	0	1+2	0
21	MF	(United States) USA	Anthony Fontana	15	2	2+8	0	3+1	2	0+1	0
24	MF	(Slovakia) SVK	Matej Oravec	0	0	0	0	0	0	0	0
25	MF	(Brazil) BRA	Ilsinho	6	0	0+5	0	0+1	0	0	0
30	MF	(United States) USA	Paxten Aaronson	17	3	5+9	3	0+1	0	1+1	0
31	MF	(United States) USA	Leon Flach	43	1	31+3	1	6	0	3	0
33	MF	(United States) USA	Quinn Sullivan	24	2	4+17	2	0+3	0	0	0
34	MF	(United States) USA	Brandan Craig	0	0	0	0	0	0	0	0
Forwards
17	FW	(Brazil) BRA	Sergio Santos	32	6	17+9	6	2+2	0	0+2	0
19	FW	(Jamaica) JAM	Cory Burke	25	4	10+9	4	2+2	0	0+2	0
23	FW	(Poland) POL	Kacper Przybyłko	43	17	29+5	12	6	5	3	0

Source: Player Stats and Match reports in Competitions
