= 2020 Philadelphia Union season =

Philadelphia Union
2020 season
- Owner: Keystone Sports & Entertainment
- Head coach: Jim Curtin
- Stadium: Subaru Park (Capacity: 18,500)
- MLS: Conference: 1st Overall: 1st
- MLS Cup Playoffs: First round
- U.S. Open Cup: Canceled
- MLS is Back Tournament: Semi-finals
- Leagues Cup: Canceled
- Top goalscorer: League: Kacper Przybyłko; Sergio Santos (8 each); All: Sergio Santos (11)
- Average home league attendance: 2,775
- Biggest win: PHI 5–0 TOR (Oct. 24)
- Biggest defeat: DAL 2–0 PHI (Feb. 29)
Home colors	Away colors

The 2020 Philadelphia Union season was the club's eleventh season in Major League Soccer, the top flight of American soccer. The team was managed by Jim Curtin, his seventh season with the club. The Union's season began on February 29, 2020, and was scheduled on end in October or November 2020, depending on their regular season performance. On March 12, 2020, MLS suspended the season due to the ongoing COVID-19 pandemic. Originally planned to be a 30-day suspension, the league remained suspended until July 9, 2020, when competition resumed with the MLS is Back Tournament. The tournament ran through August 11, 2020, with the remainder of the season, under a truncated format, continued through November 8, 2020.

The 2020 season saw Philadelphia win their first major trophy in club history, by capturing the Supporters' Shield for the best regular season record. Philadelphia finished 14–4–5, averaging 2.04 points per game. Outside of MLS regular season play, the club was eliminated in the Conference Quarterfinals of the 2020 MLS Cup Playoffs, losing to New England Revolution. In the MLS is Back Tournament, Philadelphia reached the semifinals of the tournament before losing to eventual champions, Portland Timbers. The Union were also slated to participate the 2020 Leagues Cup and the 2020 U.S. Open Cup, but both competitions though were cancelled due to the COVID-19 pandemic.

== 2020 roster ==
As of October 10, 2020

Note: Flags indicate national team as defined under FIFA eligibility rules; some limited exceptions apply. Players may hold more than one non-FIFA nationality.

No.	Pos.	Nation	Player
1	GK	USA	Matt Freese (HGP)
2	MF	GUY	Warren Creavalle
3	DF	ENG	Jack Elliott
4	DF	USA	Mark McKenzie (HGP)
5	DF	NOR	Jakob Glesnes
7	FW	USA	Andrew Wooten
8	MF	VEN	José Martínez
11	MF	USA	Alejandro Bedoya (Captain)
12	GK	USA	Joe Bendik
13	MF	USA	Cole Turner (HGP)
14	MF	USA	Jack de Vries (HGP)
15	DF	CMR	Olivier Mbaizo
17	FW	BRA	Sergio Santos

No.	Pos.	Nation	Player
18	GK	JAM	Andre Blake (GA)
19	FW	JAM	Cory Burke
20	FW	COD	Michee Ngalina
21	MF	USA	Anthony Fontana (HGP)
22	MF	USA	Brenden Aaronson (HGP)
23	FW	POL	Kacper Przybyłko
24	MF	SVK	Matej Oravec
25	MF	BRA	Ilsinho
27	DF	GER	Kai Wagner
28	DF	USA	Ray Gaddis
32	DF	USA	Matthew Real (HGP)
35	MF	CPV	Jamiro Monteiro (DP)
78	DF	FRA	Aurelien Collin

== Transfers ==
=== In ===
Date	No.	Pos.	Player	Transferred from	Fee/notes	Source
December 23, 2019	8	MF	(Venezuela) José Martínez	(Venezuela) Zulia F.C.	$325,000	
January 1, 2020	13	MF	(United States) Cole Turner	(United States) Philadelphia Union II	Homegrown signing	
January 1, 2020	14	FW	(United States) Jack de Vries	(United States) Philadelphia Union II	Homegrown signing	
January 10, 2020	35	MF	(Cape Verde) Jamiro Monteiro	(France) FC Metz	$2,000,000; DP signing	
January 19, 2020	24	MF	(Slovakia) Matej Oravec	(Slovakia) DAC Dunajská Streda	Undisclosed fee; TAM signing	
January 31, 2020	5	DF	(Norway) Jakob Glesnes	(Norway) Strømsgodset	Undisclosed fee; TAM signing	

=== Out ===
Date	No.	Pos.	Player	Transferred to	Fee/notes	Source
November 20, 2019	6	MF	(Bosnia and Herzegovina) Haris Medunjanin	(United States) FC Cincinnati	End of contract	
November 20, 2019	10	MF	(Mexico) Marco Fabián	(Qatar) Al Sadd SC	Declined contract option	
November 20, 2019	16	DF	(United States) R. J. Allen		Declined contract option	
November 20, 2019	26	DF	(United States) Auston Trusty	(United States) Colorado Rapids	$300,000 TAM (2020) $300,000 GAM (2021) $150,000 GAM (2021)	
November 20, 2019	33	DF	(Brazil) Fabinho		Declined contract option	
November 26, 2019	9	MF	(United States) Fafà Picault	(United States) FC Dallas	$300,000 GAM (2020) $75,000 GAM (2021)	

Contingent on undisclosed 2020 season performance metrics.

=== Loan out ===
Date	No.	Pos.	Player	Loaned to	Fee/notes	Source
February 6, 2020	19	FW	(Jamaica) Cory Burke	(Austria) SKN St. Pölten	5-month loan	

== Staff ==
As of February 8, 2020

Position	Staff	Nationality
Head coach	Jim Curtin	United States
Technical director	Chris Albright	United States
Assistant coach	Oka Nikolov	Macedonia
Assistant coach	Pat Noonan	United States
Director of Goalkeeping	Phil Wheddon	United States
Head athletic trainer	Paul Rushing	United States
Team coordinator	Josh Gros	United States
Sporting director	Ernst Tanner	Germany
Academy director	Tommy Wilson	Scotland

== Competitions ==
=== Preseason ===
January 29 Preseason 1	Philadelphia Union	0–4	Atlanta United FC	Bradenton, Florida
11:00 AM EST		Report	J. Martínez; Collin (o.g.); G. Martínez	Stadium: IMG Academy

February 1 Preseason 2	Philadelphia Union	3–0	Chicago Fire FC	Clearwater, Florida
4:00 PM EST	Przybyłko 35'; Fontana 40'; Rayyan 50'	Report		Stadium: Joe DiMaggio Sports Complex

February 5 Preseason 3	Philadelphia Union	1–0	Montreal Impact	Clearwater, Florida
7:00 PM EST	Przybyłko (yellow card) 28', (goal) 57'; Martínez (yellow card) 89'	Report	Bojan (yellow card) 16'	Stadium: Joe DiMaggio Sports Complex

February 12 Preseason 4	Philadelphia Union	0–1	FC Cincinnati	Bradenton, Florida
7:00 PM EST		MLS Report; Union Report	Goal	Stadium: IMG Academy

February 15 Preseason 5	Philadelphia Union	2–1	Inter Miami CF	St. Petersburg, Florida
4:30 PM EST	Santos 19'; Oravec 86'	MLS Report; Union Report	Pizarro 33'	Stadium: Al Lang Stadium

February 19 Preseason 6	Philadelphia Union	2–3	FC Dallas	Clearwater, Florida
12:00 PM EST	Ilsinho 77', 88'	Report	Picault 16'; Ondrášek,	Stadium: Joe DiMaggio Sports Complex

February 22 Preseason 7	Philadelphia Union	1–3	D.C. United	Clearwater, Florida
7:00 PM EST	Jamiro 44'	Report	Kamara 18', 55' (pen.); Segura 59'	Stadium: Joe DiMaggio Sports Complex

=== MLS ===
==== League tables ====
===== Eastern Conference =====
Pos	Team	Pld	W	L	T	GF	GA	GD	Pts	PPG	Qualification
1	Philadelphia Union	23	14	4	5	44	20	+24	47	2.04	Qualification for the playoffs first round and CONCACAF Champions League (Note: As Supporters' Shield winners)
2	Toronto FC (Note: Canadian clubs could not qualify for the 2021 CONCACAF Champions League through the MLS regular season or playoffs.)	23	13	5	5	33	26	+7	44	1.91	Qualification for the playoffs first round and CONCACAF Champions League (Note: As 2020 Canadian Championship finalists (awarded by Canada Soccer))
3	Columbus Crew SC (C)	23	12	6	5	36	21	+15	41	1.78	Qualification for the playoffs first round and CONCACAF Champions League (Note: As MLS Cup 2020 champions)
4	Orlando City SC	23	11	4	8	40	25	+15	41	1.78	Qualification for the playoffs first round and Leagues Cup
5	New York City FC	23	12	8	3	37	25	+12	39	1.70	Qualification for the playoffs first round and Leagues Cup

Source: MLS
Rules for classification: 1) points per game; 2) total wins per match played; 3) total goal differential per match played; 4) total goals scored per match played; 5) fewest disciplinary points per match played; 6) away goal differential per away match played; 7) away goals scored per away match played; 8) home goal differential per home match played; 9) home goals scored per home match played; 10) coin toss or drawing of lots.
(C) Champions

===== Overall =====
2020 MLS overall standings
Pos	Team	Pld	W	L	T	GF	GA	GD	Pts	PPG	Qualification
1	Philadelphia Union (S)	23	14	4	5	44	20	+24	47	2.04	2021 CONCACAF Champions League (Note: As Supporters' Shield winners (USA2))
2	Toronto FC (V)	23	13	5	5	33	26	+7	44	1.91	2021 CONCACAF Champions League (Note: As 2020 Canadian Championship finalists (awarded by Canada Soccer) (CAN1))
3	Sporting Kansas City	21	12	6	3	38	25	+13	39	1.86	2021 Leagues Cup (Note: As 1st, Western Conference (MLS1))
4	Columbus Crew SC (C)	23	12	6	5	36	21	+15	41	1.78	2021 CONCACAF Champions League (Note: As MLS Cup 2020 champions (USA1))
5	Orlando City SC	23	11	4	8	40	25	+15	41	1.78	2021 Leagues Cup (Note: As 4th, Eastern Conference (MLS2))

Source: MLS
Rules for classification: 1) points per game; 2) total wins per match played; 3) total goal differential per match played; 4) total goals scored per match played; 5) fewest disciplinary points per match played; 6) away goal differential per away match played; 7) away goals scored per away match played; 8) home goal differential per home match played; 9) home goals scored per home match played; 10) coin toss or drawing of lots.
(C) Champions; (S) Supporters' Shield winners; (V) Canadian Championship finalists

==== Match results ====
Only matches numbered in the left column apply to the season standings

February 29 1	FC Dallas	2–0	Philadelphia Union	Frisco, Texas
6:00 PM EST	Ondrášek 61', (yellow card) 86'; Pomykal 90+1'	Report	Real (yellow card) 26'; Glesnes (yellow card) 59'; Creavalle (yellow card) 67'; Santos (yellow card) 84'	Stadium: Toyota Stadium; Attendance: 16,219; Referee: Robert Sibiga

March 8 2	Los Angeles FC	3–3	Philadelphia Union	Los Angeles, California
10:30 PM EDT	Vela 38'; Palacios (yellow card) 45+2'; Rossi 49'; Segura 71'	Report	Santos 29'; Gaddis (yellow card) 33'; Martínez (yellow card) 43'; Bedoya (yellow card) 45+4'; Glesnes 48'; Aaronson 69'; Fontana (yellow card) 90+6'	Stadium: Banc of California Stadium; Attendance: 22,112; Referee: Chris Penso

July 9 3 MLSiBT Group stage	New York City FC	0–1	Philadelphia Union	Bay Lake, Florida
9:00 AM EDT	Tinnerholm (yellow card) 82'	Report	Martínez (yellow card) 34'; Monteiro (yellow card) 45+6'; Bedoya 63'; Glesnes (yellow card) 89'	Stadium: ESPN Wide World of Sports Complex; Attendance: 0 (closed door); Referee: Armando Villarreal

July 14 4 MLSiBT Group stage	Philadelphia Union	2–1	Inter Miami CF	Bay Lake, Florida
10:30 PM EDT	Wagner 5'; Martínez (yellow card) 27'; Przybyłko 63'	Report	Pizarro 36'; Trapp (yellow card) 38'; Reyes (yellow card) 67' (yellow-red card) 90+8'	Stadium: ESPN Wide World of Sports Complex; Attendance: 0 (closed door); Referee: Silviu Petrescu
Note: Match postponed due to the COVID-19 pandemic

July 20 5 MLSiBT Group stage	Philadelphia Union	1–1	Orlando City SC	Bay Lake, Florida
8:00 PM EDT	Bedoya (yellow card) 56'; Ilsinho 68'; Glesnes (yellow card) 80'	Report	Rosell (yellow card) 67'; Pereyra 70'; Ruan (yellow card) 90+1'	Stadium: ESPN Wide World of Sports Complex; Attendance: 0 (closed door); Referee: Rubiel Vazquez

August 20 6	New England Revolution	0–0	Philadelphia Union	Foxborough, Massachusetts
7:30 PM EDT	Bye (yellow card) 25'; Polster (yellow card) 44'	Report	McKenzie (yellow card) 50'; Elliott (yellow card) 53'	Stadium: Gillette Stadium; Referee: Robert Sibiga

August 25 7	Philadelphia Union	1–0	New York Red Bulls	Chester, Pennsylvania
7:30 PM EDT	Przybylko 31'; Gaddis (yellow card) 36'; Monteiro (yellow card) 52'	Report		Stadium: Subaru Park; Referee: Rubiel Vazquez

August 29 8	Philadelphia Union	4–1	D.C. United	Chester, Pennsylvania
7:30 PM EDT	Przybylko 7', 16'; Martínez (yellow card) 10'; Santos 21'; Mbaizo (yellow card) 56'; Aaronson 61'; Ilsinho (yellow card) 69'; Creavalle (yellow card) 80'; Monteiro (yellow card) 87'	Report	Felipe (yellow card) 19'; Gressel 63'	Stadium: Subaru Park; Referee: Fotis Bazakos

September 2 9	Columbus Crew SC	1–0	Philadelphia Union	Columbus, Ohio
7:30 PM EST	Mensah (yellow card) 52'; Zelarayán 55'	Report	Monteiro (yellow card) 42'; Bedoya (yellow card) 54'	Stadium: Mapfre Stadium; Referee: Robert Sibiga

September 6 10	New York Red Bulls	0–3	Philadelphia Union	Harrison, New Jersey
7:00 PM EST		Report	Aaronson 36'; Przybylko 68'; Real 78'	Stadium: Red Bull Arena; Referee: Rosendo Mendoza

September 12 11	Philadelphia Union	2–1	New England Revolution	Chester, Pennsylvania
7:30 PM EDT	Fontana (yellow card) 65', (goal) 73', 90+5'; Martínez (yellow card) 20'; Gaddis (yellow card) 36'; Bedoya (yellow card) 50'; McKenzie (yellow card) 90'	Report	Polster (yellow card) 8' (yellow-red card) 56'; Buchanan 81'	Stadium: Subaru Park; Referee: Guido Gonzales, Jr.

September 20 12	Montreal Impact	1–4	Philadelphia Union	Harrison, New Jersey
7:00 PM EDT	Quioto 5', (red card) 16'	Report	Bedoya 22'; Blake (yellow card) 28'; Przybylko 45+3', 47'; Fontana 65'	Stadium: Red Bull Arena; Referee: Marcos de Oliveira

September 23 13	FC Cincinnati	0–0	Philadelphia Union	Cincinnati, Ohio
7:30 PM EDT	Gyau (yellow card) 19'; Waston (yellow card) 47'; Medunjanin (yellow card) 63'; Amaya (yellow card) 90+3'	Report	Bedoya (yellow card) 59'; Przybylko (yellow card) 79'	Stadium: Nippert Stadium; Referee: Guido Gonzales, Jr.

September 27 14	Philadelphia Union	3–0	Inter Miami CF	Chester, Pennsylvania
7:30 PM EDT	Fontana 25'; Santos (yellow card) 46'; Ilsinho 69'; Aaronson 90+6'	Report	Reyes (yellow card) 5'; G. Higuaín (penalty missed) 77'	Stadium: Subaru Park; Referee: Elton García

October 3 15	Toronto FC	2–1	Philadelphia Union	East Hartford, Connecticut
7:30 PM EDT	Akinola 58'; Pozuelo 76'	Report	Santos 5'; Martínez (yellow card) 83'	Stadium: Pratt & Whitney Stadium; Referee: Victor Rivas

October 7 16	Philadelphia Union	3–0	FC Cincinnati	Chester, Pennsylvania
7:30 PM EDT	Bedoya (yellow card) 40', (goal) 73'; Ilsinho 59'; McKenzie (yellow card) 66'; Elliott 80'; Mbaizo (yellow card) 90+3'	Report		Stadium: Subaru Park; Referee: Jon Freemon

October 11 17	Philadelphia Union	2–1	Montreal Impact	Chester, Pennsylvania
7:30 PM EDT	Monteiro 39'; Santos 48'; Mbaizo (yellow card) 58'; Bedoya (yellow card) 76'; Real (yellow card) 90+3'	Report	Piette (yellow card) 55'; Wanyama (yellow card) 59'; Sejdič 65'; Corrales (yellow card) 71'	Stadium: Subaru Park; Referee: Ted Unkel

October 14 18	D.C. United	2–2	Philadelphia Union	Washington, D.C.
8:00 PM EDT	Santos (yellow card) 42'; Fontana 49', (yellow card) 53'; Canouse (yellow card) 60'; McKenzie 87'	Report	Pines 71'; Bedoya (yellow card) 74'; Mbaizo (yellow card) 81'; Asad 75' (pen.)	Stadium: Audi Field; Referee: Marcos de Oliveira

October 19 19	New England Revolution	1–2	Philadelphia Union	Foxborough, Massachusetts
7:30 PM EDT	Buchanan 80'; Polster (yellow card) 90+2'	Report	Farrell 34' (o.g.); Santos (yellow card) 57'; Fontana 69'; Monteiro (yellow card) 87'	Stadium: Gillette Stadium; Referee: Rubiel Vazquez

October 24 20	Philadelphia Union	5–0	Toronto FC	Chester, Pennsylvania
7:30 PM EDT	Monteiro (yellow card) 9', (goal) 56'; Santos 27', 63', 68'; McKenzie 33'; Blake (yellow card) 64'	Report	Auro (yellow card) 10'; Mullins (yellow card) 73'	Stadium: Subaru Park; Referee: Jair Marrufo

October 28 21	Philadelphia Union	2–1	Chicago Fire FC	Chester, Pennsylvania
7:30 PM EDT	Przybyłko 28' (pen.); Burke 65'; Elliott (yellow card) 16'; Fontana (yellow card) 48'; Bedoya (yellow card) 68'; Ilsinho (yellow card) 90+4'	Report	Calvo (red card) 36'; Berić 42', (yellow card) 45'; Medrán (yellow card) 57'; Mihailovic (yellow card) 88'	Stadium: Subaru Park; Referee: Guido Gonzales, Jr.

November 1 22	Columbus Crew SC	2–1	Philadelphia Union	Columbus, Ohio
3:30 PM EST	Artur 37'; Valenzuela (yellow card) 71'; Németh 84'	Report	Monteiro 57' (pen.); Glesnes (yellow card) 72'	Stadium: Mapfre Stadium; Attendance: 1,500; Referee: Allen Chapman

November 8 23	Philadelphia Union	2–0	New England Revolution	Chester, Pennsylvania
3:30 PM EST	Santos 42'; Burke 69'; Martínez (yellow card) 86'	Report	Farrell (yellow card) 31'; Bunbury (yellow card) 55'; Caldwell (yellow card) 90+6'	Stadium: Subaru Park; Attendance: 2,775; Referee: Drew Fischer

=== MLS Cup Playoffs ===
November 24 First round	Philadelphia Union	0–2	New England Revolution	Chester, Pennsylvania
8:00 PM EST	Przybyłko (yellow card) 36'; Wagner (yellow card) 73'	Report	Buksa 26'; Buchanan 30'; Polster (yellow card) 88'	Stadium: Subaru Park; Referee: Joseph Dickerson

=== MLS is Back Tournament ===
==== Group stage ====
===== Group A standings =====
Group A results
Pos	Team	Pld	W	D	L	GF	GA	GD	Pts	Qualification
1	Orlando City SC (H)	3	2	1	0	6	3	+3	7	Advanced to knockout stage
2	Philadelphia Union	3	2	1	0	4	2	+2	7	Advanced to knockout stage
3	New York City FC	3	1	0	2	2	4	−2	3	Advanced to knockout stage
4	Inter Miami CF	3	0	0	3	2	5	−3	0	

Source: MLS
(H) Hosts

===== Group A results =====
July 9 1 (MLS 3)	New York City FC	0–1	Philadelphia Union	Bay Lake, Florida
9:00 AM EDT	Tinnerholm (yellow card) 82'	Report	Martínez (yellow card) 34'; Monteiro (yellow card) 45+6'; Bedoya 63'; Glesnes (yellow card) 89'	Stadium: ESPN Wide World of Sports Complex; Attendance: 0 (closed door); Referee: Armando Villarreal

July 14 2 (MLS 4)	Philadelphia Union	2–1	Inter Miami CF	Bay Lake, Florida
10:30 PM EDT	Wagner 5'; Martínez (yellow card) 27'; Przybyłko 63'	Report	Pizarro 36'; Trapp (yellow card) 38'; Reyes (yellow card) 67' (yellow-red card) 90+8'	Stadium: ESPN Wide World of Sports Complex; Attendance: 0 (closed door); Referee: Silviu Petrescu
Note: Match postponed due to the COVID-19 pandemic

July 20 3 (MLS 5)	Philadelphia Union	1–1	Orlando City SC	Bay Lake, Florida
8:00 PM EDT	Bedoya (yellow card) 56'; Ilsinho 68'; Glesnes (yellow card) 80'	Report	Rosell (yellow card) 67'; Pereyra 70'; Ruan (yellow card) 90+1'	Stadium: ESPN Wide World of Sports Complex; Attendance: 0 (closed door); Referee: Rubiel Vazquez

==== Knockout round ====
July 25 Round of 16	Philadelphia Union	1–0	New England Revolution	Bay Lake, Florida
10:30 PM EDT	Santos 63'	Report		Stadium: ESPN Wide World of Sports Complex; Attendance: 0 (closed door); Referee: Ismail Elfath

July 30 Quarter-finals	Philadelphia Union	3–1	Sporting Kansas City	Bay Lake, Florida
8:00 PM EDT	Monteiro 24'; Martínez (yellow card) 25'; Santos 26', 39'; Elliott (yellow card) 53'	Report	Pulido 45+1'; Gerso (yellow card) 71'	Stadium: ESPN Wide World of Sports Complex; Attendance: 0 (closed door); Referee: Ramy Touchan

August 5 Semi-finals	Philadelphia Union	1–2	Portland Timbers	Bay Lake, Florida
8:00 PM EDT	Wooten 85'	Report	Ebobisse 13'; Blanco 70'	Stadium: ESPN Wide World of Sports Complex; Attendance: 0 (closed door); Referee: Allen Chapman

=== U.S. Open Cup ===
Due to their final standings for the 2019 season, the Union were scheduled to enter the competition in the Fourth Round, to be played May 19–20. The ongoing coronavirus pandemic, however, forced the U.S. Soccer Federation to cancel the tournament on August 17, 2020.
