= Jamiro Monteiro =

Cape Verdean footballer (born 1993)

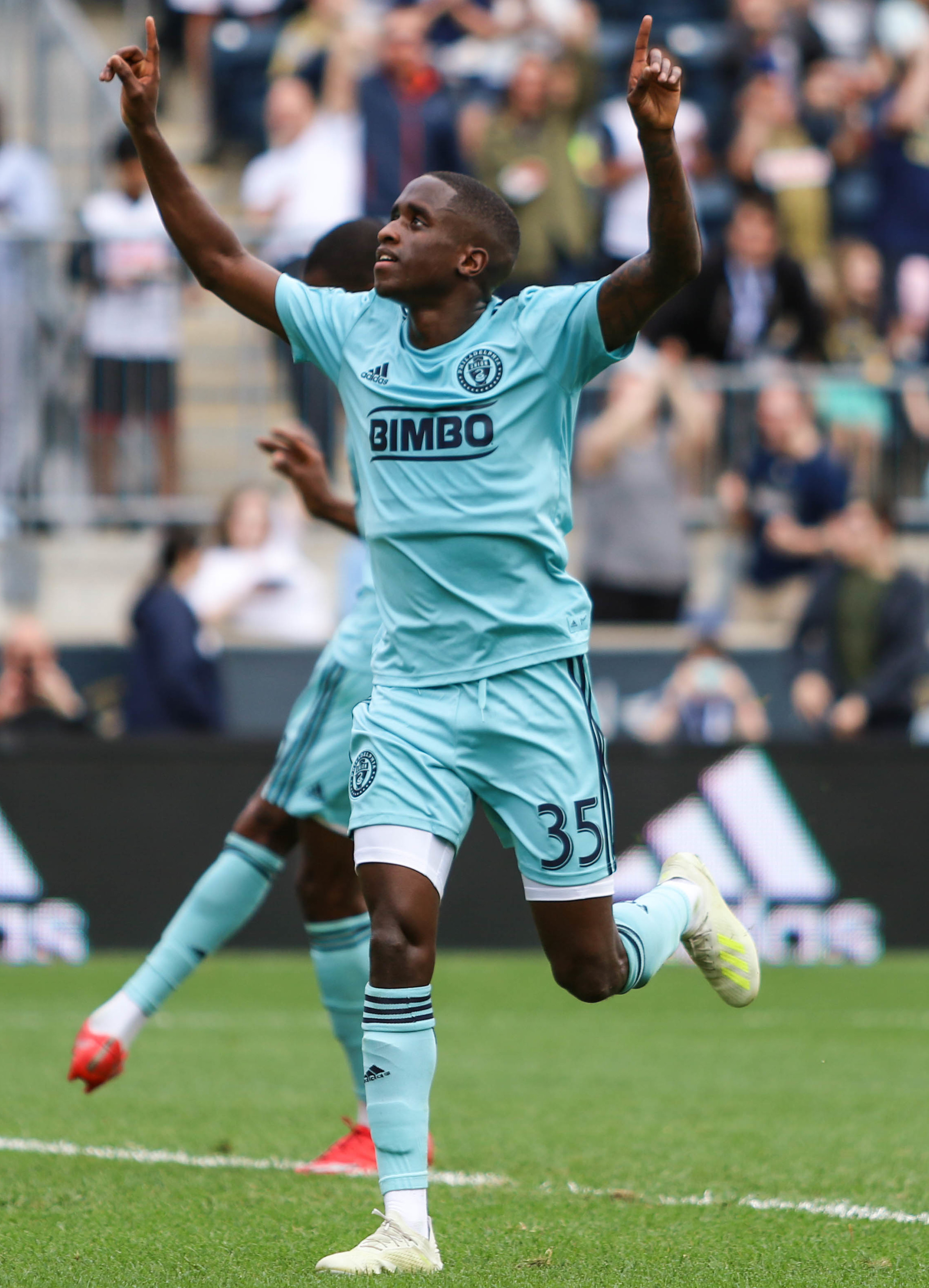
- Monteiro with the Philadelphia Union in 2019

Personal information
- Full name: Jamiro Gregory Monteiro Alvarenga
- Date of birth: 23 November 1993 (age 32)
- Place of birth: Rotterdam, Netherlands
- Height: 1.70 m (5 ft 7 in)
- Position: Midfielder

Team information
- Current team: NEC
- Number: 35

Youth career
- Dordrecht
- Hansa Rostock
- Anker Wismar
- Cambuur

Senior career*
Years	Team	Apps	(Gls)
2015–2017	Cambuur	56	(6)
2017–2018	Heracles Almelo	34	(4)
2018–2020	Metz	3	(0)
2019	→ Philadelphia Union (loan)	26	(4)
2020–2021	Philadelphia Union	49	(5)
2022–2023	San Jose Earthquakes	59	(5)
2024	Gaziantep	13	(1)
2024–2026	PEC Zwolle	49	(4)
2026–	NEC	9	(0)

International career^{‡}
2016–	Cape Verde	61	(5)
- * Club domestic league appearances and goals as of 25 October 2026 ‡ National team caps and goals as of 29 September 2026

Jamiro Gregory Monteiro Alvarenga (Portuguese: [ʒɐ.ˈmi.ɾu ˈɡɾɛ.ɡɔ.ɾi mõ.ˈtej.ɾu al.vɐ.ˈɾẽ.ɡɐ]; born 23 November 1993), commonly known as Jamiro, is a professional footballer who plays as a midfielder for Eredivisie club NEC. Born in the Netherlands, he plays for the Cape Verde national team.

== Early life ==
Monteiro was raised by his Cape Verde immigrant parents in Rotterdam, Netherlands. Monteiro played in the youth teams of Sparta Rotterdam, Dordrecht, Hansa Rostock, Anker Wismar, and Cambuur. Often viewed as undersized, at age 20, Monteiro's footballing skills eventually landed him the opportunity to join the U21 system at Dordrecht. By 21, he eventually signed a contract with the U21 system at Cambuur with the intention of making the first team. His brother Ayoni Santos is also a professional footballer.

== Club career ==
=== Cambuur ===
Monteiro started his professional career with Cambuur, playing in Eredivisie, the highest level of professional football in the Netherlands. He made his debut on 19 September 2015, in a home match against FC Twente (0–0), coming on as a substitute for Jack Byrne in the 61st minute. He scored his first goal on 20 December 2015, in a 4–1 away win against his hometown club Excelsior Rotterdam. After one season in the top flight, his club was relegated to the Eerste Divisie.

On 25 January 2017, Monteiro scored the winning penalty kick in a penalty shootout in the quarter-finals of the 2016–17 KNVB Cup against FC Utrecht. Cambuur thus qualified for the semi-finals of the KNVB Cup for the first time in the club's history. Monteiro was awarded a Bronze Ball in March 2017, after coaches, captains and supporters of the Eerste Divisie clubs voted him the best player of the third period of the 2016–17 season.

=== Heracles Almelo ===
On 30 June 2017, Monteiro joined Eredivisie side Heracles Almelo. On 16 September 2017, he scored his first goal for Heracles in a 2–1 defeat to PEC Zwolle. On 18 April 2018, Monteiro scored two stoppage time goals, including a last minute penalty, to help Heracles draw 2–2 with Excelsior Rotterdam. On 27 January 2018, Monteiro opened the scoring for Heracles in a 3–3 draw with FC Groningen.

=== Metz ===
On 28 July 2018, Monteiro joined Ligue 2 side Metz on a three-year deal. On 3 August 2018, Monteiro made his debut for Metz in a 5–1 victory over US Orléans, coming on as a substitute for Ibrahima Niane in the 66th minute.

=== Philadelphia Union ===
In March 2019, Monteiro secured a four-month loan move to the Philadelphia Union of Major League Soccer with options to extend the loan and purchase. On 8 June 2019, he scored his first goal for Philadelphia in a 3–2 victory over New York Red Bulls. His performance with the Union justified the team to extend his loan to the conclusion of the 2019 season. Monteiro finished his first season in MLS making 26 appearances, 22 of which as part of the starting lineup. He scored four goals and provided nine assists ultimately helping the Union to their first ever playoff win. On 11 January 2020, Monteiro was signed permanently by the Union for a club-record fee of $2 million. He signed a three-year contract with the club as a Designated Player. Monteiro finished the 2020 season with four goals and four assists, contributing the Union's first major trophy in the 2020 Supporters' Shield.

=== San Jose Earthquakes ===
On 14 February 2022, Monteiro signed for the San Jose Earthquakes. In exchange for his transfer, the Philadelphia Union received $250,000 in allocation money, an international roster slot, and up to $200,000 in performance-based allocation money. He signed for San Jose as a Designated Player. On 14 May 2022, Monteiro scored his first goal for San Jose in a 3–3 draw with Vancouver Whitecaps. On 19 May 2022, Monteiro was awarded MLS Player of the Week for Week 12 of the 2022 season in recognition of his two goals in a 3–2 win over the Portland Timbers.

=== PEC Zwolle ===
On 30 August 2024, Monteiro signed a two-year contract (with an option for a third year) with PEC Zwolle.

=== NEC ===
On 13 July 2026, Monteiro joined NEC on a two-season deal.

== International career ==
Monteiro was born in Netherlands to parents of Cape Verdean descent. In March 2016, Monteiro received his first international call for the Cape Verde national team for 2017 Africa Cup of Nations qualification. He made his debut in a 2–0 loss against Morocco as a late substitute. On 7 October 2021, Monteiro scored his first national team goal during the second round of the 2022 FIFA World Cup qualification: an equalizer versus Liberia.

Monteiro was a member of Cape Verde's squad for the 2021 Africa Cup of Nations. He played in the team's second and third Group A matches: a 1–0 loss to Burkina Faso and a 1–1 draw with host nation Cameroon. His third appearance at the tournament was a 2–0 loss to eventual champions Senegal in the round of 16.

In December 2023, Monteiro was named in Cape Verde's squad for his second Africa Cup of Nations – the 2023 tournament in the Ivory Coast. He scored Cape Verde's opening goal of the tournament in the 17th minute of the team's 2–1 win over Ghana in their first Group B match.

On 18 May 2026, he was called up by Cape Verde's head coach Bubista for the 2026 FIFA World Cup.

== Personal life ==
Monteiro is a convert to Islam. He is one of three Muslim players in the Cape Verde squad for the 2026 FIFA World Cup, the others being Logan Costa and Steven Moreira.

== Career statistics ==
=== Club ===
As of match played 25 October 2026

Appearances and goals by club, season and competition
Club	Season	League			National cup (Note: Includes KNVB Cup, Coupe de France, U.S. Open Cup)		Continental		Other		Total	
Club	Season	Division	Apps	Goals	Apps	Goals	Apps	Goals	Apps	Goals	Apps	Goals
Cambuur	2015–16	Eredivisie	20	2	0	0	–		–		20	2
Cambuur	2016–17	Eerste Divisie	36	4	5	2	–		2 (Note: Appearances in Eerste Divisie promotion play-offs)	0	43	6
Cambuur	Total		56	6	5	2	0	0	2	0	63	8
Heracles Almelo	2017–18	Eredivisie	34	4	3	1	–		–		37	5
Metz	2018–19	Ligue 2	3	0	1	0	0	0	3 (Note: Appearances in Coupe de la Ligue)	0	7	0
Philadelphia Union	2019	MLS	26	4	1	0	–		2 (Note: Appearances in MLS Cup Playoffs)	0	29	4
Philadelphia Union	2020	MLS	22	3	—		–		4 (Note: Appearances in MLS is Back Tournament, appearances in MLS Cup Playoffs)	1	26	4
Philadelphia Union	2021	MLS	27	2	—		5	2	2	0	34	4
Philadelphia Union	Total		75	9	1	0	5	2	8	1	89	12
San Jose Earthquakes	2022	MLS	31	4	2	0	–		–		33	4
San Jose Earthquakes	2023	MLS	28	1	1	0	1	0	1 (Note: Appearances in MLS Cup Playoffs)	0	31	1
San Jose Earthquakes	Total		59	5	3	0	1	0	1	0	64	5
Gaziantep	2023–24	Süper Lig	13	1	–		–		–		13	1
PEC Zwolle	2024–25	Eredivisie	28	2	1	1	–		–		29	3
PEC Zwolle	2025–26	Eredivisie	21	2	2	0	–		–		23	2
PEC Zwolle	Total		49	4	3	1	–		–		52	5
NEC	2026–27	Eredivisie	9	0	0	0	5 (Note: Three appearances in UEFA Champions League, two appearances in UEFA Europa League)	0	–		14	0
Career total			298	29	16	4	11	2	14	1	339	36

=== International ===
As of match played 29 September 2026

Appearances and goals by national team and year
National team	Year	Apps	Goals
Cape Verde	2016	3	0
Cape Verde	2017	2	0
Cape Verde	2018	0	0
Cape Verde	2019	2	0
Cape Verde	2020	2	0
Cape Verde	2021	7	1
Cape Verde	2022	9	1
Cape Verde	2023	6	1
Cape Verde	2024	12	2
Cape Verde	2025	9	0
Cape Verde	2026	8	0
Total		61	5

Scores and results list Cape Verde's goal tally first.

No.	Date	Venue	Opponent	Score	Result	Competition
1.	7 October 2021	Accra Sports Stadium, Accra, Ghana	Liberia	1–1	2–1	2022 FIFA World Cup qualification
2.	7 June 2022	Marrakesh Stadium, Marrakesh, Morocco	Togo	2–0	2–0	2023 Africa Cup of Nations qualification
3.	21 November 2023	Mbombela Stadium, Mbombela, South Africa	Eswatini	2–0	2–0	2026 FIFA World Cup qualification
4.	14 January 2024	Felix Houphouet Boigny Stadium, Abidjan, Ivory Coast	Ghana	1–0	2–1	2023 Africa Cup of Nations
5.	8 June 2024	Ahmadou Ahidjo Stadium, Yaoundé, Cameroon	Cameroon	1–2	1–4	2026 FIFA World Cup qualification

== Honours ==
Philadelphia Union

- Supporters' Shield: 2020

Individual

- CONCACAF Champions League Team of the Tournament: 2021
