= 2019 Philadelphia Union season =

Major League Soccer team season

Philadelphia Union
2019 season
- Owner: Keystone Sports & Entertainment
- Head coach: Jim Curtin
- Stadium: Talen Energy Stadium (Capacity: 18,500)
- MLS: Conference: 3rd Overall: 5th
- MLS Cup Playoffs: Conference semifinals
- U.S. Open Cup: 4th Round
- Top goalscorer: League: Kacper Przybyłko (15); All: Kacper Przybyłko (15)
- Highest home attendance: 19,145 (September 14 vs. LAFC)
- Lowest home attendance: 12,890 (May 1 vs. FC Cincinnati)
- Average home league attendance: 17,190
- Biggest win: 6–1 (May 4, 2019, vs. New England)
- Biggest defeat: 0–4 (July 13, 2019, at RSL) (July 27, 2019, at Montreal)
Home colors	Away colors

The 2019 Philadelphia Union season was the club's tenth season in Major League Soccer, the top flight of American soccer. The team was managed by Jim Curtin, his sixth season with the club. Building on the previous 2018 season, the Union won their first MLS Cup Playoff match in club history, in a comeback 4–3 win against New York Red Bulls. Additionally, the team set new records for points earned within a single season (55), wins (16), and goals scored (58).

== Roster ==
As of July 29, 2019

Note: Flags indicate national team as defined under FIFA eligibility rules; some limited exceptions apply. Players may hold more than one non-FIFA nationality.

No.	Pos.	Nation	Player
1	GK	USA	Matt Freese
2	MF	GUY	Warren Creavalle
3	DF	ENG	Jack Elliot
4	DF	USA	Mark McKenzie (HGP)
6	MF	BIH	Haris Medunjanin
7	FW	USA	Andrew Wooten
9	MF	USA	Fafà Picault
10	MF	MEX	Marco Fabián (DP)
11	MF	USA	Alejandro Bedoya (DP, Captain)
12	GK	USA	Joe Bendik
15	DF	CMR	Olivier Mbaizo
16	DF	USA	R. J. Allen
17	FW	BRA	Sergio Santos
18	GK	JAM	Andre Blake (GA)

No.	Pos.	Nation	Player
19	FW	JAM	Cory Burke
20	FW	COD	Michee Ngalina
21	MF	USA	Anthony Fontana (HGP)
22	MF	USA	Brenden Aaronson (HGP)
23	FW	POL	Kacper Przybyłko
25	MF	BRA	Ilsinho
26	DF	USA	Auston Trusty (HGP)
27	DF	GER	Kai Wagner
28	DF	USA	Ray Gaddis
32	DF	USA	Matthew Real (HGP)
33	DF	BRA	Fabinho
35	MF	CPV	Jamiro Monteiro (DP)
78	DF	FRA	Aurélien Collin

== Transfers ==
=== In ===
Date	No.	Pos.	Player	Transferred from	Fee/notes	Source
December 14, 2018	17	FW	(Brazil) Sergio Santos	(Chile) Audax Italiano	$500,000; TAM signing	
December 21, 2018	1	GK	(United States) Matt Freese	(United States) Harvard University	Homegrown signing	
January 22, 2019	78	DF	(France) Aurelien Collin	(United States) New York Red Bulls	Free Agent	
February 6, 2019	27	DF	(Germany) Kai Wagner	(Germany) Würzburger Kickers	Undisclosed fee	
February 8, 2019	10	MF	(Mexico) Marco Fabian	(Germany) Eintracht Frankfurt	Free transfer; 5% sell-on fee	
May 8, 2019	20	FW	(Democratic Republic of the Congo) Michee Ngalina	(United States) Bethlehem Steel FC	Free transfer	

=== Loan in ===
Date	No.	Pos.	Player	Parent club	Fee/notes	Source
January 24, 2019	31	GK	(Brazil) Carlos Miguel Coronel	(Austria) Red Bull Salzburg	1-year loan, option to buy	
March 5, 2019	35	MF	(Cape Verde) Jamiro Monteiro	(France) FC Metz	4-month loan, full-year option, option to buy Extended loan, end of 2019 season	

=== Out ===
Date	No.	Pos.	Player	Transferred to	Fee/notes	Source
November 19, 2018	15	DF	(Ghana) Joshua Yaro	(United States) San Antonio FC	Declined contract option	
November 19, 2018	16	DF	(United States) Richie Marquez		Declined contract option	
November 19, 2018	20	MF	(United States) Marcus Epps	(United States) New York Red Bulls	Declined contract option	
November 19, 2018	24	MF	(United States) Adam Najem	(United States) Memphis 901 FC	Declined contract option	
November 19, 2018	27	GK	(United States) John McCarthy	(United States) Tampa Bay Rowdies	End of Contract	
November 19, 2018	27	FW	(England) Jay Simpson	(England) Leyton Orient	Declined contract option	
November 19, 2018	29	GK	(United States) Jake McGuire	(Sweden) Gefle IF	Declined contract option	
December 9, 2018	14	MF	(Germany) Fabian Herbers	(United States) Chicago Fire	2nd round 2019 SuperDraft	
December 19, 2019	12	DF	(United States) Keegan Rosenberry	(United States) Colorado Rapids	$150,000 GAM (2019) $100,000 GAM (2020) $100,000 GAM (2020) $50,000 TAM (2020)	
February 23, 2019	17	FW	(United States) C.J. Sapong	(United States) Chicago Fire	$200,000 GAM (2019) $100,000 GAM (2020) $100,000 TAM (2020) $50,000 TAM (2020)	
May 8, 2019	7	MF	(Ghana) David Accam	(United States) Columbus Crew	$100,000 TAM $400,000 GAM; Int'l Roster Spot	
May 9, 2019	8	MF	(United States) Derrick Jones	(United States) Nashville SC	$175,000 GAM	

Contingent on undisclosed 2019 season performance metrics.

== Staff ==
As of June 11, 2019

Position	Staff	Nationality
Head coach	Jim Curtin	United States
Technical director	Chris Albright	United States
Assistant coach and director of goalkeeping	Oka Nikolov	Macedonia
Assistant coach	Pat Noonan	United States
Head athletic trainer	Paul Rushing	United States
Team coordinator	Josh Gros	United States
Sporting director	Ernst Tanner	Germany
Academy director	Tommy Wilson	Scotland

Note: Dick Schreuder served as assistant coach through Week 17 and departed for TSG Hoffenheim after June 8.

== Competitions ==
=== Preseason ===
January 30, 2019 1	Philadelphia Union	3–2	New York Red Bulls	Clearwater, Florida
3:00 p.m. EST	Burke 14'; Picault 47'; Fontana, (yellow card) 60' (yellow-red card) 78'	PHI Report; NYRB Report	(yellow card) 29'; Wright-Phillips (yellow card) 44'; Muyl 85' (pen.); Tarek 89'	Stadium: Joe DiMaggio Sports Complex

February 2, 2019 2	USF Bulls	0–0	Philadelphia Union	Clearwater, Florida
7:00 p.m. EST	(yellow card) 23'			Stadium: Joe DiMaggio Sports Complex

February 6, 2019 3	Philadelphia Union	3–1	Birmingham Legion FC	Clearwater, Florida
7:00 p.m. EST	Ilsinho 14'; Przybyłko 72'; Accam 85'	Report	Hoffman 7'; (yellow card) 79'	Stadium: Joe DiMaggio Sports Complex

February 12, 2019 4	Orlando City SC	1–4	Philadelphia Union	Davenport, Florida
12:00 p.m. EST	Mueller	Report	Burke; Santos (pen.); Sapong; Ngalina	Stadium: ChampionsGate Sports Complex

February 16, 2019 5	Montreal Impact	1–0	Philadelphia Union	St. Petersburg, Florida
4:00 p.m. EST	Urruti 27'	Report		Stadium: Al Lang Stadium

February 20, 2019 6	Philadelphia Union	2–1	D.C. United	Clearwater, Florida
7:00 p.m. EST	Fabian 60'; Burke 74'	Report	Rooney 23'	Stadium: Joe DiMaggio Sports Complex

February 23, 2019 7	Philadelphia Union	2–1	Ottawa Fury FC	St. Petersburg, Florida
2:00 p.m. EST	Przybyłko 40'; Picault 65' (pen.)	Report	François 21'	Stadium: Al Lang Stadium

=== MLS season ===
March 2, 2019 1	Philadelphia Union	1–3	Toronto FC	Chester, Pennsylvania
1:00 p.m. EST	Picault (yellow card) 30'; Fabián 73' (pen.); Santos (yellow card) 81'	Report; Box Score	Bradley 45+3', 62', (yellow card) 54'; Osorio (yellow card) 83'; DeLeon 90+4'	Stadium: Talen Energy Stadium; Attendance: 16,498; Referee: Nima Saghafi

March 10, 2019 2	Sporting Kansas City	2–0	Philadelphia Union	Kansas City, Kansas
3:00 p.m. EDT	Sánchez 11' (pen.); Zusi (yellow card) 22'; Busio (yellow card) 37'; Elliott 80' (o.g.)	Report; Box Score	Fabián (yellow card) 31' (red card) 60'	Stadium: Children's Mercy Park; Attendance: 18,738; Referee: Chris Penso

March 17, 2019 3	Atlanta United FC	1–1	Philadelphia Union	Atlanta, Georgia
7:00 p.m. EDT	Barco 70'; González Pírez (yellow card) 90+2'	Report; Box Score	Aaronson 47'; Medunjanin (yellow card) 53'; Burke (yellow card) 76'	Stadium: Mercedes-Benz Stadium; Attendance: 42,651; Referee: Robert Sibiga

March 23, 2019 4	Philadelphia Union	3–0	Columbus Crew SC	Chester, Pennsylvania
7:30 p.m. EDT	Accam 31', 41'; Ilsinho 48'	Report; Box Score	Sauro (yellow card) 68'	Stadium: Talen Energy Stadium; Attendance: 15,135; Referee: Ramy Touchan

March 30, 2019 5	FC Cincinnati	0–2	Philadelphia Union	Cincinnati, Ohio
7:30 p.m. EDT		Report; Box Score	Fabián 47'; Accam 58'	Stadium: Nippert Stadium; Attendance: 25,867; Referee: Rubiel Vazquez

April 6, 2019 6	Philadelphia Union	2–1	FC Dallas	Chester, Pennsylvania
7:30 p.m. EDT	Fabián (yellow card) 9'; Burke 85'; Bedoya 90+2'	Report; Box Score	Ziegler 10', (yellow card) 85'	Stadium: Talen Energy Stadium; Attendance: 15,844; Referee: Timothy Ford

April 13, 2019 7	LA Galaxy	2–0	Philadelphia Union	Carson, California
10:30 p.m. EDT	Ibrahimovic 27', 36' (pen.); Lletget (yellow card) 62'	Report; Box Score	Wagner (yellow card) 45+2'; Trusty (yellow card) 47' (yellow-red card) 76'	Stadium: Dignity Health Sports Park; Attendance: 24,053; Referee: David Gantar

April 20, 2019 8	Philadelphia Union	3–0	Montreal Impact	Chester, Pennsylvania
1:00 p.m. EDT	Burke 14', (yellow card) 67'; Monteiro 45' (pen.); Bedoya 57'; Medunjanin (yellow card) 62'; Wagner (red card) 90'	Report; Box Score	Bush (yellow card) 78'	Stadium: Talen Energy Stadium; Attendance: 15,407; Referee: Robert Sibiga

April 27, 2019 9	Vancouver Whitecaps FC	1–1	Philadelphia Union	Vancouver, British Columbia
5:00 p.m. EDT	Henry 41'; Reyna (yellow card) 45'; Adnan (yellow card) 51'; PC (yellow card) 58'	Report; Box Score	Bedoya (yellow card) 24'; Przybyłko 66'	Stadium: BC Place; Attendance: 17,835; Referee: Chris Penso

May 1, 2019 10	Philadelphia Union	2–0	FC Cincinnati	Chester, Pennsylvania
7:30 p.m. EDT	Przybyłko 63'; Picault 70'; Trusty (yellow card) 81'	Report; Box Score		Stadium: Talen Energy Stadium; Attendance: 12,890; Referee: Guido Gonzales, Jr.

May 4, 2019 11	Philadelphia Union	6–1	New England Revolution	Chester, Pennsylvania
7:30 p.m. EDT	Elliott 11', (yellow card) 24'; Ilsinho 47', (yellow card) 77'; Picault (yellow card) 63'; Santos 69', 74'; Przybyłko 82'; Accam 88'	Report; Box Score	Caicedo (yellow card) 13', (goal) 35'	Stadium: Talen Energy Stadium; Attendance: 15,565; Referee: Joseph Dickerson

May 11, 2019 12	Toronto FC	1–2	Philadelphia Union	Toronto, Ontario
3:00 p.m. EDT	Pozuelo 51', (yellow card) 90+5'; Ciman (yellow card) 61'; Altidore (yellow card) 82'	Report; Box Score	Mavinga 25' (o.g.); Bedoya (yellow card) 32'; Monteiro 68'; Trusty (yellow card) 86'; Przybyłko (yellow card) 90+2'	Stadium: BMO Field; Attendance: 26,219; Referee: Ramy Touchan

May 18, 2019 13	Philadelphia Union	0–0	Seattle Sounders FC	Chester, Pennsylvania
7:30 p.m. EDT	Przybyłko (yellow card) 72'; Picault (yellow card) 83'	Report; Box Score	Nouhou (yellow card) 56'; Campbell (yellow card) 86'	Stadium: Talen Energy Stadium; Attendance: 18,540; Referee: Marcos de Oliveira

May 25, 2019 14	Philadelphia Union	1–3	Portland Timbers	Chester, Pennsylvania
7:30 p.m. EDT	Przybyłko 47'; Elliott (yellow card) 85'	Report; Box Score	Clark (yellow card) 22'; Fernández 31', 36'; Valeri 87'; Chará (yellow card) 90+3'	Stadium: Talen Energy Stadium; Attendance: 18,474; Referee: Drew Fischer

May 29, 2019 15	Philadelphia Union	1–1	Colorado Rapids	Chester, Pennsylvania
7:30 p.m. EDT	Santos 26'; Elliott (yellow card) 86'	Report; Box Score	Abubakar (yellow card) 50'; Rubio (yellow card) 58'; Lewis 72'	Stadium: Talen Energy Stadium; Attendance: 14,207; Referee: Timothy Ford

June 2, 2019 16	Minnesota United FC	2–3	Philadelphia Union	Saint Paul, Minnesota
4:00 p.m. EDT	Kallman (yellow card) 17'; Dotson 28'; Molino 77'	Report; Box Score	Monteiro 18' (pen.); Medunjanin 44'; Aaronson (yellow card) 45+2'; Trusty 86'; Wagner (yellow card) 89'; Gaddis (yellow card) 90+1'; Blake (yellow card) 90+3'	Stadium: Allianz Field; Attendance: 19,738; Referee: Allen Chapman

June 8, 2019 17	Philadelphia Union	3–2	New York Red Bulls	Chester, Pennsylvania
7:30 p.m. EDT	Monteiro 60', (yellow card) 90+1'; Ilsinho 61', 72'	Report; Box Score	Tarek (yellow card) 14'; Kaku 29'; White 42'; Duncan (yellow card) 57'	Stadium: Talen Energy Stadium; Attendance: 18,767; Referee: Kevin Stott

June 26, 2019 18	New England Revolution	1–1	Philadelphia Union	Foxborough, Massachusetts
7:30 p.m. EDT	Bye 31'; Gil (yellow card) 33'; Bunbury (yellow card) 61'	Report; Box Score	Aaronson (yellow card) 11'; Trusty (yellow card) 28'; Medunjanin (yellow card) 45'; Wagner (yellow card) 65'; Przybyłko 84'	Stadium: Gillette Stadium; Attendance: 11,571; Referee: Nima Saghafi

June 29, 2019 19	New York City FC	4–2	Philadelphia Union	New York, New York
7:00 p.m. EDT	Castellanos (yellow card) 13', (goal) 71', 78'; Moralez 23' (pen.), 55' (pen.); Chanot (yellow card) 39'	Report; Box Score	Picault 7'; Przybyłko 30', (yellow card) 89'; Ilsinho (yellow card) 45+2'; Bedoya (yellow card) 54'; Elliott (yellow card) 57'; Gaddis (yellow card) 88'	Stadium: Yankee Stadium; Attendance: 24,451; Referee: Alex Chilowicz

July 3, 2019 20	Orlando City SC	1–3	Philadelphia Union	Orlando, Florida
7:30pm EDT	Mueller 8'; Jansson (red card) 45'; Kljestan (red card) 67'	Report; Box Score	Medunjanin (yellow card) 26'; Przybyłko 32', 47'; Picault 52'; Wagner (yellow card) 90+1'	Stadium: Exploria Stadium; Attendance: 22,364; Referee: Chris Penso
Note: Kickoff delayed by lightning

July 7, 2019 21	Philadelphia Union	2–2	Orlando City SC	Chester, Pennsylvania
4:30pm EDT	Fabián 4'; Przybyłko 90'; Real (yellow card) 90+3'	Report; Box Score	Dwyer 67'; Patiño 81'	Stadium: Talen Energy Stadium; Attendance: 18,574; Referee: Robert Sibiga

July 13, 2019 22	Real Salt Lake	4–0	Philadelphia Union	Sandy, Utah
10:00 p.m. EDT	Saucedo (yellow card) 17'; Savarino 23', 71'; Kreilach (yellow card) 24', (goal) 89'; Beckerman (yellow card) 28'; Herrera (yellow card) 61'; Rusnák 81'	Report; Box Score	Aaronson (yellow card) 35'	Stadium: Rio Tinto Stadium; Attendance: 18,925; Referee: Silviu Petrescu

July 20, 2019 23	Philadelphia Union	2–0	Chicago Fire SC	Chester, Pennsylvania
7:30 p.m. EDT	Fabián 11'; Wagner (yellow card) 19'; Fontana 65'; Picault (yellow card) 84'	Report; Box Score	Bronico (yellow card) 7'	Stadium: Talen Energy Stadium; Attendance: 17,471; Referee: Rubiel Vazquez

July 27, 2019 24	Montreal Impact	4–0	Philadelphia Union	Montreal, Quebec
8:00 p.m. EDT	Lappalainen 4', 46'; Diallo (yellow card) 9'; Okwonkwo 36', 66'; Urruti (yellow card) 42'; Camacho (yellow card) 76'	Report; Box Score	Fabián (yellow card) 82'	Stadium: Saputo Stadium; Attendance: 16,344; Referee: Jair Marrufo

August 4, 2019 25	D.C. United	1–5	Philadelphia Union	Washington, D.C.
7:30 p.m. EDT	Moreno (red card) 40'; Brillant 54'	Report; Box Score	Bedoya 3', (yellow card) 31'; Medunjanin (yellow card) 25'; Fabián (yellow card) 42', (goal) 45+2', 70'; Przybyłko 52'; Collin (yellow card) 53'; Picault 90'	Stadium: Audi Field; Attendance: 18,697; Referee: Armando Villarreal

August 11, 2019 26	Philadelphia Union	2–1	Houston Dynamo	Chester, Pennsylvania
6:00 p.m. EDT	Przybyłko 18'; Elliott 78'	Report; Box Score	Figueroa (yellow card) 34'; Ramirez 42'; Cabezas (yellow card) 58'	Stadium: Talen Energy Stadium; Attendance: 18,550; Referee: Marcos de Oliveira

August 17, 2019 27	Chicago Fire SC	2–0	Philadelphia Union	Bridgeview, Illinois
8:00 p.m. EDT	Nikolic 38', 45' (pen.); Gaitán (red card) 45+3'	Report	Collin (yellow card) 43'; Monteiro (yellow card) 66'	Stadium: SeatGeek Stadium; Attendance: 14,883; Referee: Joseph Dickerson

August 24, 2019 28	Philadelphia Union	3–1	D.C. United	Chester, Pennsylvania
7:30 p.m. EDT	Przybyłko 5'; Aaronson 16'; Ilsinho 36'; Bedoya (yellow card) 73'	Report	Arriola (yellow card) 21'; Acosta 56'; Jara (yellow card) 90+3'	Stadium: Talen Energy Stadium; Attendance: 18,781; Referee: Chris Penso

August 31, 2019 29	Philadelphia Union	3–1	Atlanta United FC	Chester, Pennsylvania
7:30 p.m. EDT	Aaronson 61'; Fabián (yellow card) 78'; Przybyłko 86'; Santos 88', (yellow card) 89'	Report; Box Score	Remedi (yellow card) 12'; Martínez 45+2'; González Pírez (yellow card) 90+3'	Stadium: Talen Energy Stadium; Attendance: 18,510; Referee: Robert Sibiga

September 14, 2019 30	Philadelphia Union	1–1	Los Angeles FC	Chester, Pennsylvania
7:30 p.m. EDT	Przybyłko 3'	Report; Box Score	Vela 43'; Kaye (yellow card) 65'; Blessing (yellow card) 78'; Harvey (yellow card) 88'; Zimmerman (yellow card) 89'	Stadium: Talen Energy Stadium; Attendance: 19,145; Referee: Nima Saghafi

September 22, 2019 31	New York Red Bulls	2–0	Philadelphia Union	Harrison, New Jersey
6:00 p.m. EDT	Barlow 32'; Rzatkowski (yellow card) 60'; Royer 90+6'	Report; Box Score		Stadium: Red Bull Arena; Attendance: 19,262; Referee: Jair Marrufo

September 25, 2019 32	San Jose Earthquakes	1–2	Philadelphia Union	San Jose, California
11:00 p.m. EDT	Judson (yellow card) 23'; Yueill 35'	Report; Box Score	Wagner (yellow card) 7'; Medunjanin (yellow card) 45+1'; Przybyłko (yellow card) 57', (goal) 76'; Bedoya 70'	Stadium: Avaya Stadium; Attendance: 16,652; Referee: Baldomero Toledo

September 29, 2019 33	Columbus Crew SC	2–0	Philadelphia Union	Columbus, Ohio
5:00 p.m. EDT	Trapp (yellow card) 55'; Mokhtar 69', (yellow card) 80'; Santos 73'	Report; Box Score	Monteiro (yellow card) 13'; Przybyłko (yellow card) 90+1'	Stadium: Mapfre Stadium; Attendance: 20,353; Referee: Rubiel Vazquez

October 6, 2019 34	Philadelphia Union	1–2	New York City FC	Chester, Pennsylvania
4:00 p.m. EDT	Fabián 87' (pen.)	Report; Box Score	Matarrita 7'; Tajouri-Shradi 22'; Chanot (yellow card) 27'; Tinnerholm (yellow card) 66'; Ring (yellow card) 90+5'	Stadium: Talen Energy Stadium; Attendance: 18,525; Referee: Drew Fischer

=== MLS Cup Playoffs ===
October 20, 2019 First round	Philadelphia Union	4–3 (a.e.t.)	New York Red Bulls	Chester, Pennsylvania
3:00 p.m. EDT	Bedoya 30', (yellow card) 58'; Monteiro (yellow card) 36'; Elliott 52'; Picault 78'; Fabián 105+1'; Ilsinho (yellow card) 108'	Report; Box Score	Sims 6'; Parker 24', (yellow card) 107'; Barlow 45+4'; Cásseres (yellow card) 114'	Stadium: Talen Energy Stadium; Attendance: 18,530; Referee: Chris Penso

October 24, 2019 Conference semifinals	Atlanta United FC	2–0	Philadelphia Union	Atlanta, Georgia
8:00 p.m. EDT	Gressel 10', (yellow card) 38'; Martínez 80'; Escobar (yellow card) 87'	Report; Box Score	Bedoya (yellow card) 34'; Wagner (yellow card) 74'	Stadium: Mercedes-Benz Stadium; Attendance: 41,507; Referee: Ismail Elfath

=== U.S. Open Cup ===
June 12, 2019 Fourth round	D.C. United (Washington, D.C.)	2–1 (a.e.t.)	(Pennsylvania) Philadelphia Union	Washington D.C.
19:00 EST	Robinson (yellow card) 68'; Rodríguez (yellow card) 83'; McCann 118'; Rooney 120' (pen.)	Report; Box Score	Bedoya (yellow card) 95'; McKenzie (yellow card) 96'; Fontana 113'; Ilsinho (yellow card) 115'	Stadium: Audi Field; Referee: Marcos de Oliveira

== Standings ==
=== Eastern Conference ===
2019 MLS Eastern Conference standings
Pos	Team	Pld	W	L	T	GF	GA	GD	Pts	Qualification
1	New York City FC	34	18	6	10	63	42	+21	64	Qualification for the conference semifinals
2	Atlanta United FC	34	18	12	4	58	43	+15	58	Qualification for the first round
3	Philadelphia Union	34	16	11	7	58	50	+8	55	Qualification for the first round
4	Toronto FC	34	13	10	11	57	52	+5	50	Qualification for the first round
5	D.C. United	34	13	10	11	42	38	+4	50	Qualification for the first round
6	New York Red Bulls	34	14	14	6	53	51	+2	48	Qualification for the first round
7	New England Revolution	34	11	11	12	50	57	−7	45	Qualification for the first round
8	Chicago Fire	34	10	12	12	55	47	+8	42	
9	Montreal Impact	34	12	17	5	47	60	−13	41	
10	Columbus Crew SC	34	10	16	8	39	47	−8	38	
11	Orlando City SC	34	9	15	10	44	52	−8	37	
12	FC Cincinnati	34	6	22	6	31	75	−44	24	

Source: MLS
Rules for classification: 1) points; 2) total wins; 3) total goal differential; 4) total goals scored; 5) disciplinary points; 6) away goal differential; 7) away goals scored; 8) home goals scored; 9) home goal differential; 10) coin toss or drawing of lots.

=== League standings ===
2019 MLS regular season standings
Pos	Team	Pld	W	L	T	GF	GA	GD	Pts	
2	New York City FC	34	18	6	10	63	42	+21	64	Qualification for the CONCACAF Champions League
3	Atlanta United FC (U)	34	18	12	4	58	43	+15	58	Qualification for the CONCACAF Champions League
4	Seattle Sounders FC (C)	34	16	10	8	52	49	+3	56	Qualification for the CONCACAF Champions League
5	Philadelphia Union	34	16	11	7	58	50	+8	55	
6	Real Salt Lake	34	16	13	5	46	41	+5	53	
7	Minnesota United FC	34	15	11	8	52	43	+9	53	
8	LA Galaxy	34	16	15	3	58	59	−1	51	

Source: MLS
Rules for classification: 1) points; 2) total wins; 3) total goal differential; 4) total goals scored; 5) disciplinary points; 6) away goals scored; 7) away goal differential; 8) coin toss or drawing of lots
(C) MLS Cup champions; (U) U.S. Open Cup winners

=== Results summary ===
Overall								Home						Away					
Pld	W	D	L	GF	GA	GD	Pts	W	D	L	GF	GA	GD	W	D	L	GF	GA	GD
34	16	7	11	58	50	+8	55	10	4	3	36	19	+17	6	3	8	22	31	−9

Last updated: October 8, 2019.
Source: MLS

Round	1	2	3	4	5	6	7	8	9	10	11	12	13	14	15	16	17	18	19	20	21	22	23	24	25	26	27	28	29	30	31	32	33	34
Stadium	H	A	A	H	A	H	A	H	A	H	H	A	H	H	H	A	H	A	A	A	H	A	H	A	A	H	A	H	H	H	A	A	A	H
Result	L	L	T	W	W	W	L	W	T	W	W	W	T	L	T	W	W	T	L	W	T	L	W	L	W	W	L	W	W	T	L	W	L	L
Position	10	12	12	8	4	4	5	3	3	1	1	1	1	2	2	1	1	1	1	1	1	1	1	1	1	1	2	2	1	2	3	3	3	3

Updated to match(es) played on October 6, 2019. Source: 2019 MLS season & Weekly MLS Standing
A = Away; H = Home; W = Win; L = Loss; T = Tie

Position references Eastern Conference standings.

== Statistics ==
=== Appearances and goals ===
Last updated October 20, 2019

No.	Pos	Nat	Player	Total		MLS		U.S. Open Cup		MLS Cup Playoffs	
No.	Pos	Nat	Player	Apps	Goals	Apps	Goals	Apps	Goals	Apps	Goals
Goalkeepers
1	GK	(United States) USA	Matt Freese	7	0	5+1	0	1	0	0	0
18	GK	(Jamaica) JAM	Andre Blake	28	0	26	0	0	0	2	0
31	GK	(Brazil) BRA	Carlos Miguel Coronel	4	0	3+1	0	0	0	0	0
Defenders
3	DF	(England) ENG	Jack Elliott	36	3	34	2	0	0	2	1
4	DF	(United States) USA	Mark McKenzie	10	0	6+1	0	1	0	2	0
15	DF	(Cameroon) CMR	Olivier Mbaizo	4	0	2+1	0	1	0	0	0
26	DF	(United States) USA	Auston Trusty	22	1	22	1	0	0	0	0
27	DF	(Germany) GER	Kai Wagner	32	0	30	0	0	0	2	0
28	DF	(United States) USA	Ray Gaddis	37	0	34	0	0+1	0	2	0
32	DF	(United States) USA	Matthew Real	4	0	1+2	0	0+1	0	0	0
33	DF	(Brazil) BRA	Fabinho	2	0	1	0	1	0	0	0
78	DF	(France) FRA	Aurélien Collin	7	0	6	0	1	0	0	0
Midfielders
2	MF	(Guyana) GUY	Warren Creavalle	14	0	5+8	0	0	0	0+1	0
6	MF	(Bosnia and Herzegovina) BIH	Haris Medunjanin	37	1	34	1	1	0	2	0
8	MF	(United States) USA	Derrick Jones	2	0	0+2	0	0	0	0	0
10	MF	(Mexico) MEX	Marco Fabián	25	8	15+8	7	0	0	0+2	1
11	MF	(United States) USA	Alejandro Bedoya	35	5	32	4	1	0	2	1
21	MF	(United States) USA	Anthony Fontana	9	2	0+8	1	0+1	1	0	0
22	MF	(United States) USA	Brenden Aaronson	30	3	25+3	3	0	0	2	0
25	MF	(Brazil) BRA	Ilsinho	31	5	7+21	5	1	0	0+2	0
35	MF	(Cape Verde) CPV	Jamiro Monteiro	29	4	22+4	4	1	0	2	0
38	MF	(United States) USA	Zach Zandi	1	0	0	0	0+1	0	0	0
Forwards
7	FW	(Ghana) GHA	David Accam	8	4	4+4	4	0	0	0	0
7	FW	(United States) USA	Andrew Wooten	9	0	4+3	0	0	0	1+1	0
9	FW	(United States) USA	Fafà Picault	35	5	21+11	4	1	0	1+1	1
17	FW	(Brazil) BRA	Sergio Santos	20	4	5+12	4	1	0	2	0
19	FW	(Jamaica) JAM	Cory Burke	7	2	5+2	2	0	0	0	0
20	FW	(Democratic Republic of the Congo) COD	Michee Ngalina	1	0	0+1	0	0	0	0	0
23	FW	(Poland) POL	Kacper Przybyłko	26	15	25+1	15	0	0	0	0
