= Mark McKenzie (soccer, born 1999) =

American soccer player (born 1999)

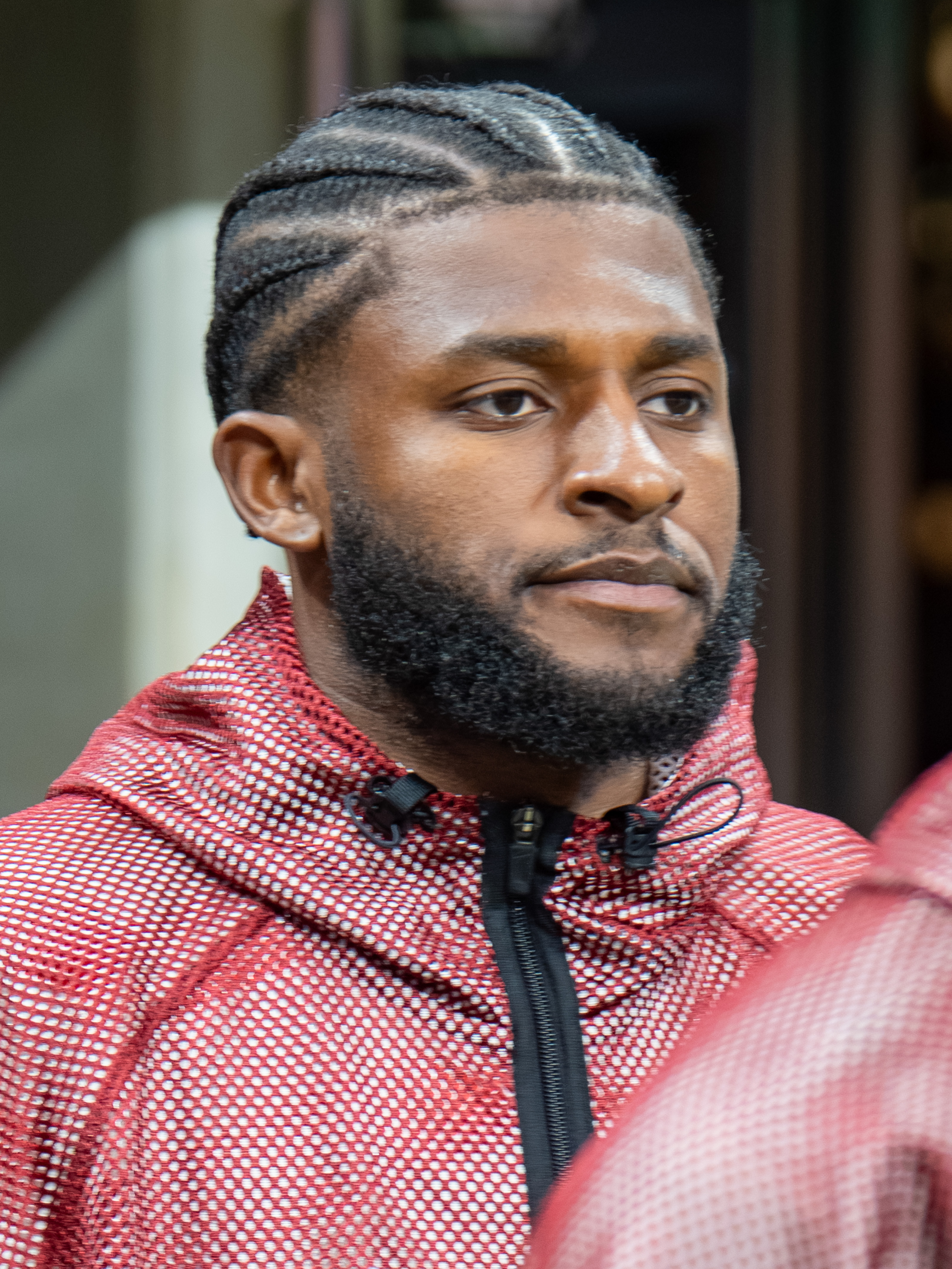
- McKenzie with the United States in 2026

Personal information
- Full name: Mark Alexander McKenzie
- Date of birth: February 25, 1999 (age 27)
- Place of birth: The Bronx, New York, U.S.
- Height: 6 ft 0 in (1.84 m)
- Position: Center-back

Team information
- Current team: Toulouse
- Number: 3

Youth career
- 2015–2016: Philadelphia Union

College career
Years	Team	Apps	(Gls)
2017	Wake Forest Demon Deacons	16	(0)

Senior career*
Years	Team	Apps	(Gls)
2016–2019	Bethlehem Steel	17	(0)
2018–2020	Philadelphia Union	48	(2)
2021–2024	Genk	104	(4)
2024–	Toulouse	66	(1)

International career^{‡}
2017	United States U18	5	(0)
2018–2019	United States U20	12	(3)
2019	United States U23	3	(0)
2020–	United States	30	(0)
Medal record
Representing United States
Men's soccer
CONCACAF Gold Cup
Runner-up	2025 Canada–United States
CONCACAF Nations League
Winner	2021 United States
Winner	2024 United States
- * Club domestic league appearances and goals as of October 12, 2026 ‡ National team caps and goals as of June 25, 2026

Mark Alexander McKenzie (born February 25, 1999) is an American professional soccer player who plays as center-back for Ligue 1 club Toulouse and the United States national team. He will join Major League Soccer club Philadelphia Union in January 2027.

== Youth and college soccer ==
Growing up in Bear, Delaware, McKenzie began playing club soccer for Delaware Rush and Wilmington Rangers before being brought into the Philadelphia Union Academy. He is of Jamaican descent through his father. McKenzie played college soccer at Wake Forest University starting in 2017, joining his academy teammates Matthew Real and Joseph DeZart. McKenzie made his first start for the Deacons as a freshman against Clemson University. He registered 16 appearances and five starts for the Deacons.

== Professional career ==
=== Bethlehem Steel ===
McKenzie's performance in the academy ranks earned him call-ups to the Bethlehem Steel FC roster, the Union's USL team. He made his professional debut against New York Red Bulls II in June 2016. Over two seasons, McKenzie made eight appearances for the Steel as an amateur player.

=== Philadelphia Union ===
On January 18, 2018, McKenzie signed a homegrown player contract with Major League Soccer side Philadelphia Union. He made 20 appearances his rookie season with the Union, mostly starting alongside fellow homegrown centerback, Auston Trusty. McKenzie's appearances and performance on the backline earned him a nomination for the 2018 MLS Rookie of the Year Award.

After losing his starting spot in the first team during the first half of the 2019 season, he reentered the line-up establishing himself as an initiator of attacks as a left-sided centerback. He retained his starting role through the 2020 season, earning accolades along the way. By mid-season, he made the Best XI for the MLS is Back Tournament. McKenzie's first professional goal for the Union was a long-range equalizer against D.C. United in October 2020. McKenzie finished the season with two goals and three assists from 22 matches, contributing to the Union's first trophy in the 2020 Supporters' Shield. His performances named him to the MLS Best XI and nominated for the 2020 Defender of the Year (finishing second in the voting).

=== Genk ===
On January 7, 2021, McKenzie joined Belgian First Division A side Genk, signing a four-and-a-half-year deal. McKenzie made his debut for Genk on January 24, starting in a 2–3 loss against Club Brugge. He finished his first season making 16 appearances in all competitions and helped Genk win the Belgian Cup.

=== Toulouse ===
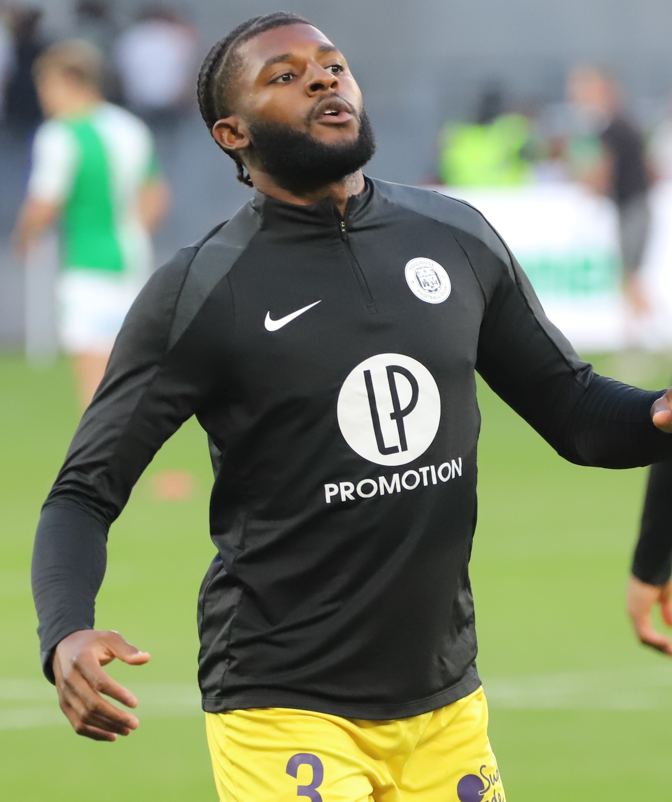
McKenzie with Toulouse in 2025.

On August 16, 2024, McKenzie signed with Toulouse in France.

=== Return to Philadelphia Union ===
On September 30, 2026, it was announced McKenzie will rejoin the Philadelphia Union on a contract that runs through the 2029–30 season that is set to take effect on January 1, 2027. He will occupy a Designated Player spot.

== International career ==
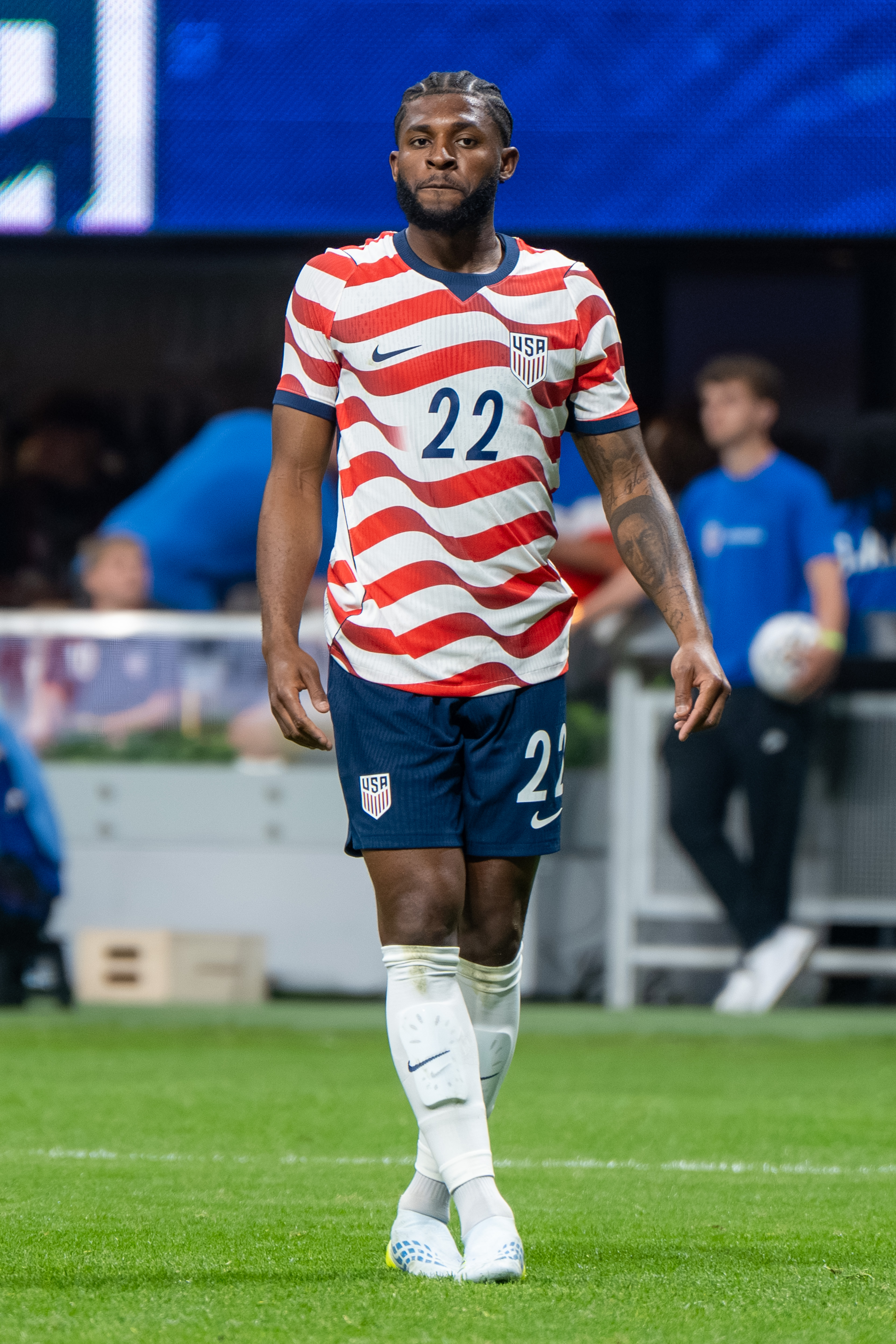
McKenzie in 2026

McKenzie spent time in the US development ranks, being called into under-15 and under-16 camps. In 2017, McKenzie was called into the United States under-18s for the Slovakia Cup. He made seven appearances for the team in 2017. His performances earned him 2016–17 Conference Best XI honors for the US Development Academy Eastern Conference under-18s.

McKenzie received a call-up to the United States under-20 squad to compete in the 2018 CONCACAF U-20 Championship. McKenzie scored three goals during the qualifying group stages and captained the team in a 7–0 victory against Suriname. Mark was named captain of the under-20 squad. On December 20, 2018, McKenzie received his first senior call up for a friendly against Panama.

On February 1, 2020, McKenzie earned his first senior cap for the national team as a substitute in a friendly match against Costa Rica.

McKenzie earned his World Cup qualifying debut in September 2021, starting in a 4–1 comeback win at Honduras.

On May 26, 2026, McKenzie was selected in the 26-man squad for the 2026 FIFA World Cup.

== Personal life ==
McKenzie is a Christian. He is married to his wife, Carley. They have one son together.

== Career statistics ==
=== Club ===
As of match played October 10, 2026

Appearances and goals by club, season and competition
Club	Season	League			National cup (Note: Includes U.S. Open Cup, Belgian Cup and Coupe de France)		Continental		Other		Total	
Club	Season	Division	Apps	Goals	Apps	Goals	Apps	Goals	Apps	Goals	Apps	Goals
Bethlehem Steel FC	2016	USL	3	0	—		—		—		3	0
Bethlehem Steel FC	2017	USL	6	0	—		—		—		6	0
Bethlehem Steel FC	2018	USL	2	0	—		—		—		2	0
Bethlehem Steel FC	2019	USL	6	0	—		—		—		6	0
Bethlehem Steel FC	Total		17	0	—		—		—		17	0
Philadelphia Union	2018	MLS	19	0	3	0	—		1 (Note: Appearance(s) in MLS Cup playoffs)	0	23	0
Philadelphia Union	2019	MLS	7	0	1	0	—		2	0	10	0
Philadelphia Union	2020	MLS	22 (Note: Includes three appearances in MLS is Back Tournament group stage)	2	—		—		4 (Note: Three appearances in MLS is Back Tournament knockout stage, one appearance in MLS Cup playoffs)	0	26	2
Philadelphia Union	Total		48	2	4	0	—		7	0	59	2
Genk	2020–21	Belgian Pro League	13	0	3	0	—		—		16	0
Genk	2021–22	Belgian Pro League	22	0	2	0	3 (Note: Appearances in UEFA Europa League)	0	1 (Note: Appearance in Belgian Super Cup)	0	28	0
Genk	2022–23	Belgian Pro League	36	4	3	0	—		—		39	4
Genk	2023–24	Belgian Pro League	32	0	2	0	10 (Note: Two appearances in UEFA Champions League, two appearances in UEFA Europa League, six appearances and one goal in UEFA Europa Conference League)	1	—		44	1
Genk	2024–25	Belgian Pro League	1	0	—		—		—		1	0
Genk	Total		104	4	10	0	13	1	1	0	128	5
Toulouse	2024–25	Ligue 1	30	1	3	0	—		—		33	1
Toulouse	2025–26	Ligue 1	30	0	4	0	—		—		34	0
Toulouse	2026–27	Ligue 1	6	0	—		—		—		6	0
Toulouse	Total		66	1	7	0	—		—		73	1
Career total			235	7	21	0	13	1	8	0	277	8

=== International ===
As of match played June 25, 2026

Appearances and goals by national team and year
National team	Year	Apps	Goals
United States	2020	2	0
United States	2021	6	0
United States	2022	2	0
United States	2023	3	0
United States	2024	4	0
United States	2025	8	0
United States	2026	5	0
Total		30	0

== Honors ==
Philadelphia Union

- Supporters' Shield: 2020

Genk

- Belgian Cup: 2020–21

United States U20

- CONCACAF U-20 Championship: 2018

United States

- CONCACAF Nations League: 2019–20, 2023–24

Individual

- CONCACAF Under-20 Championship Best XI: 2018
- MLS is Back Tournament Best XI: 2020
- MLS Best XI: 2020
