= Brenden Aaronson =

American soccer player (born 2000)

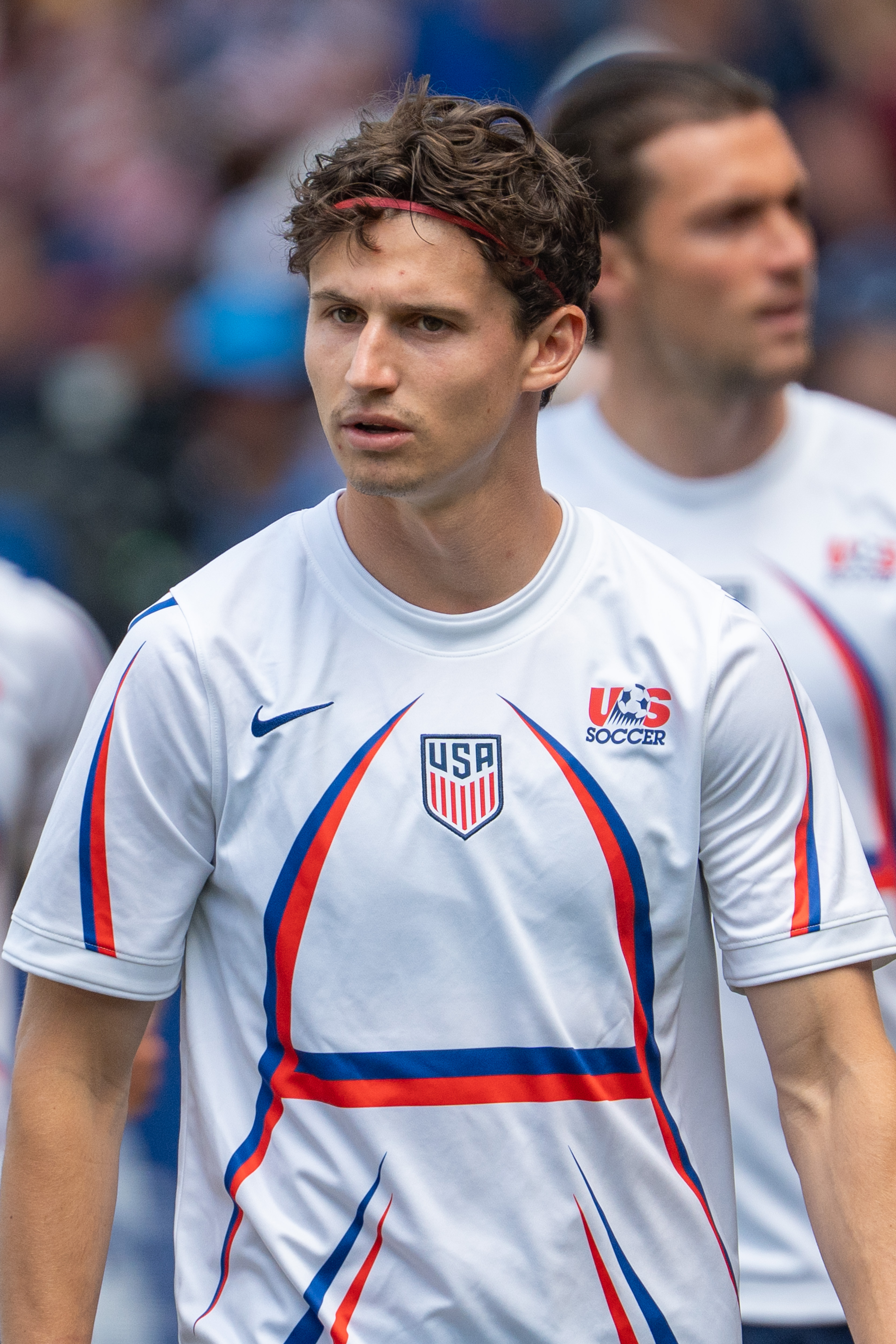
- Aaronson with the United States in 2026

Personal information
- Full name: Brenden Russell Aaronson
- Date of birth: October 22, 2000 (age 26)
- Place of birth: Medford, New Jersey, U.S.
- Height: 5 ft 10 in (1.77 m)
- Positions: Attacking midfielder; winger

Team information
- Current team: Leeds United
- Number: 11

Youth career
- 2015–2016: Shawnee Renegades
- 2016–2018: Philadelphia Union

Senior career*
Years	Team	Apps	(Gls)
2017–2018	Bethlehem Steel	21	(1)
2019–2020	Philadelphia Union	51	(7)
2021–2022	Red Bull Salzburg	46	(9)
2022–	Leeds United	128	(15)
2023–2024	→ Union Berlin (loan)	30	(2)

International career^{‡}
2015	United States U15	2	(0)
2019	United States U23	3	(0)
2020–	United States	59	(9)
Medal record
Representing United States
Men's soccer
CONCACAF Gold Cup
Runner-up	2025 Canada–United States
CONCACAF Nations League
Winner	2021
Winner	2023
Winner	2024
- * Club domestic league appearances and goals as of November 21, 2026 ‡ National team caps and goals as of June 25, 2026

Brenden Russell Aaronson (born October 22, 2000) is an American professional soccer player who plays as an attacking midfielder or winger for Premier League club Leeds United and the United States national team.

== Early life ==
Raised in Medford, New Jersey, Aaronson attended Shawnee High School for a single year before being selected to the Philadelphia Union's YSC Academy, where he played soccer and completed his high school education. During his time at YSC Academy, Aaronson had played for Union's youth teams before committing to Indiana University and signing an amateur contract with Bethlehem Steel FC.

== Club career ==
=== Bethlehem Steel ===
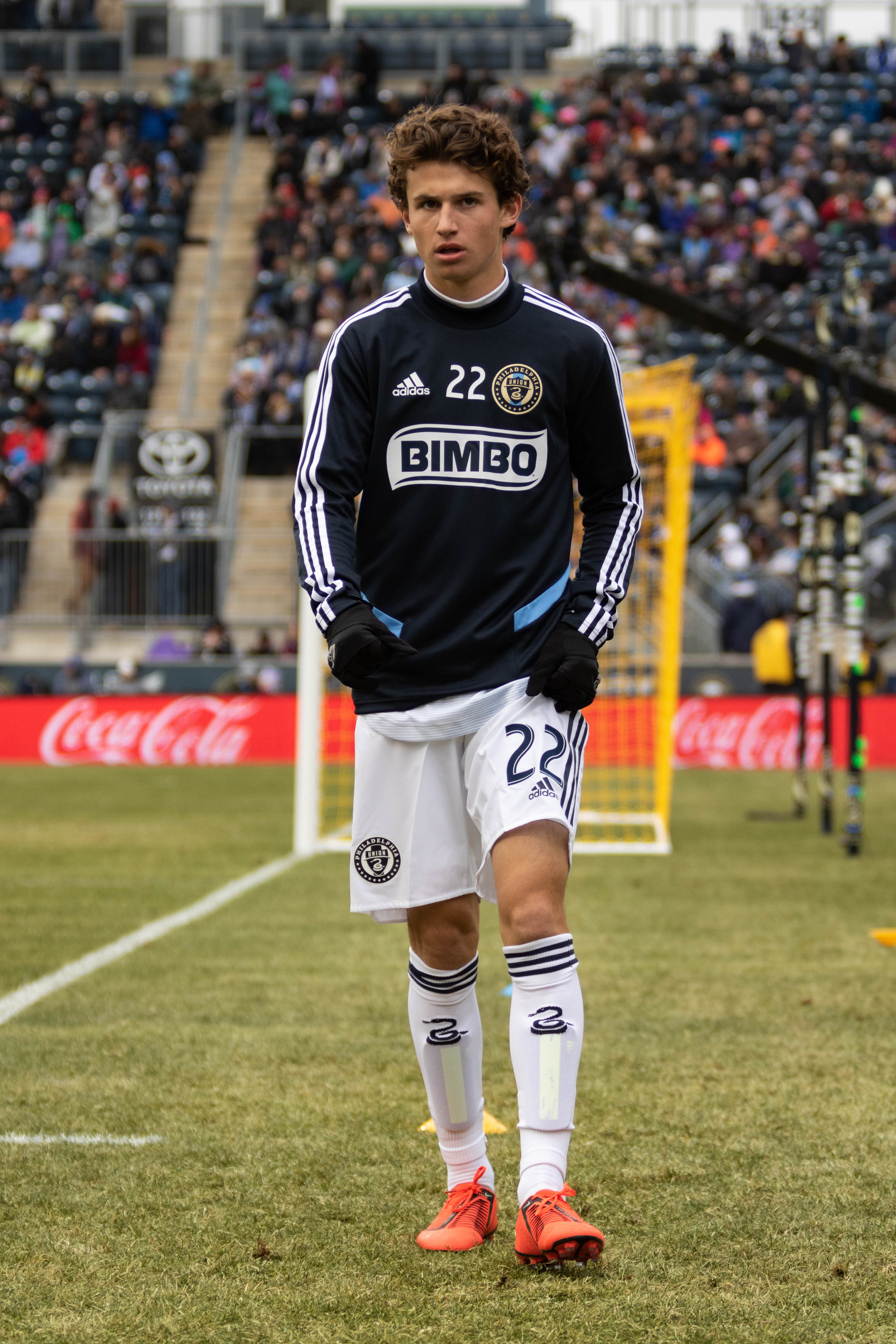
Aaronson with Philadelphia Union on March 2, 2019.

Aaronson appeared as an academy player playing for Bethlehem Steel FC during their 2017 season after coming through the Philadelphia Union academy. On September 30, 2017, Aaronson made his first start for Steel FC in an away draw versus Tampa Bay Rowdies. Aaronson made 21 appearances for Steel FC and scored his first goal for the professional side against Atlanta United 2.

=== Philadelphia Union ===
On September 17, 2018, it was announced that Aaronson would join the Philadelphia Union at the beginning of their 2019 season. On March 17, 2019, the homegrown player scored his first professional goal in his MLS debut, helping Philadelphia tie against Atlanta United. Considered to be a back-up playmaker for the Union, injuries and suspensions gave Aaronson the opportunity to start and excel in the first team as both playmaking number 10 and left-sided box-to-box midfielder.

At the end of his rookie season, Aaronson finished second for the 2019 MLS Rookie of the Year Award, with three goals and two assists in over 1,640 minutes played. Aaronson was the youngest player out of the five finalists.

The 2020 season became a breakout year for Aaronson who finished the season with 31 appearances across all competitions and scoring 4 goals. Aaronson's performance during the season earned him several accolades include being named to the 2020 MLS Best XI for the regular season and the MLS is Back Tournament. The Union finished the season with the best league record earning the team's first trophy, the 2020 Supporters' Shield.

=== Red Bull Salzburg ===
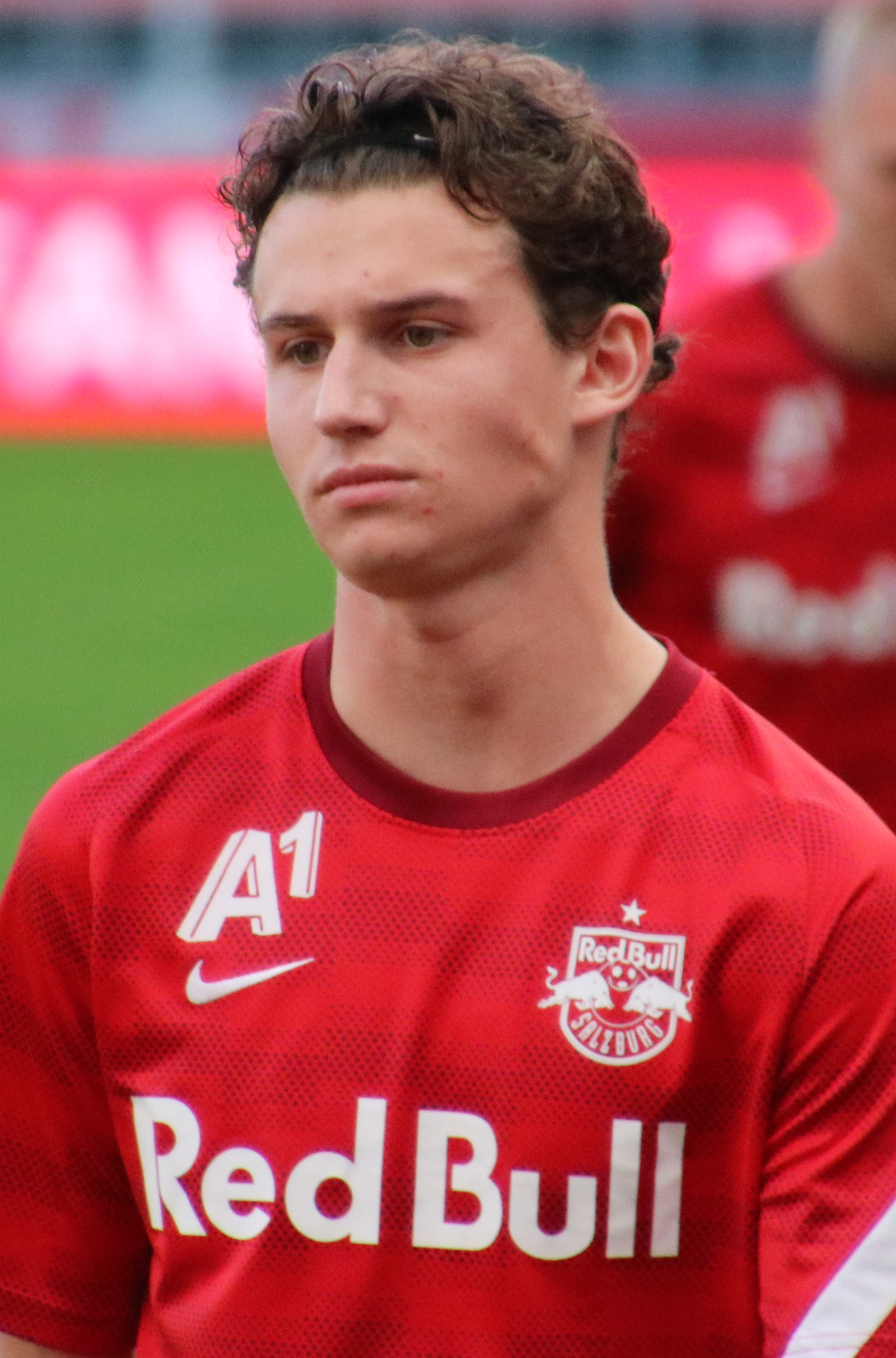
Aaronson with Red Bull Salzburg in 2021.

After persistent rumors, it was announced on October 16, 2020, that Aaronson would join Red Bull Salzburg effective January 2021 after the MLS season ended. While the transfer fee was undisclosed, Philadelphia announced that it would be the highest transfer fee paid for an American homegrown player from MLS. Early news reports indicated the fee is US$6 million up front, with US$3 million in possible incentives. Aaronson made his debut for Salzburg on January 25, as a substitute during a 2–0 victory over Rheindorf Altach.

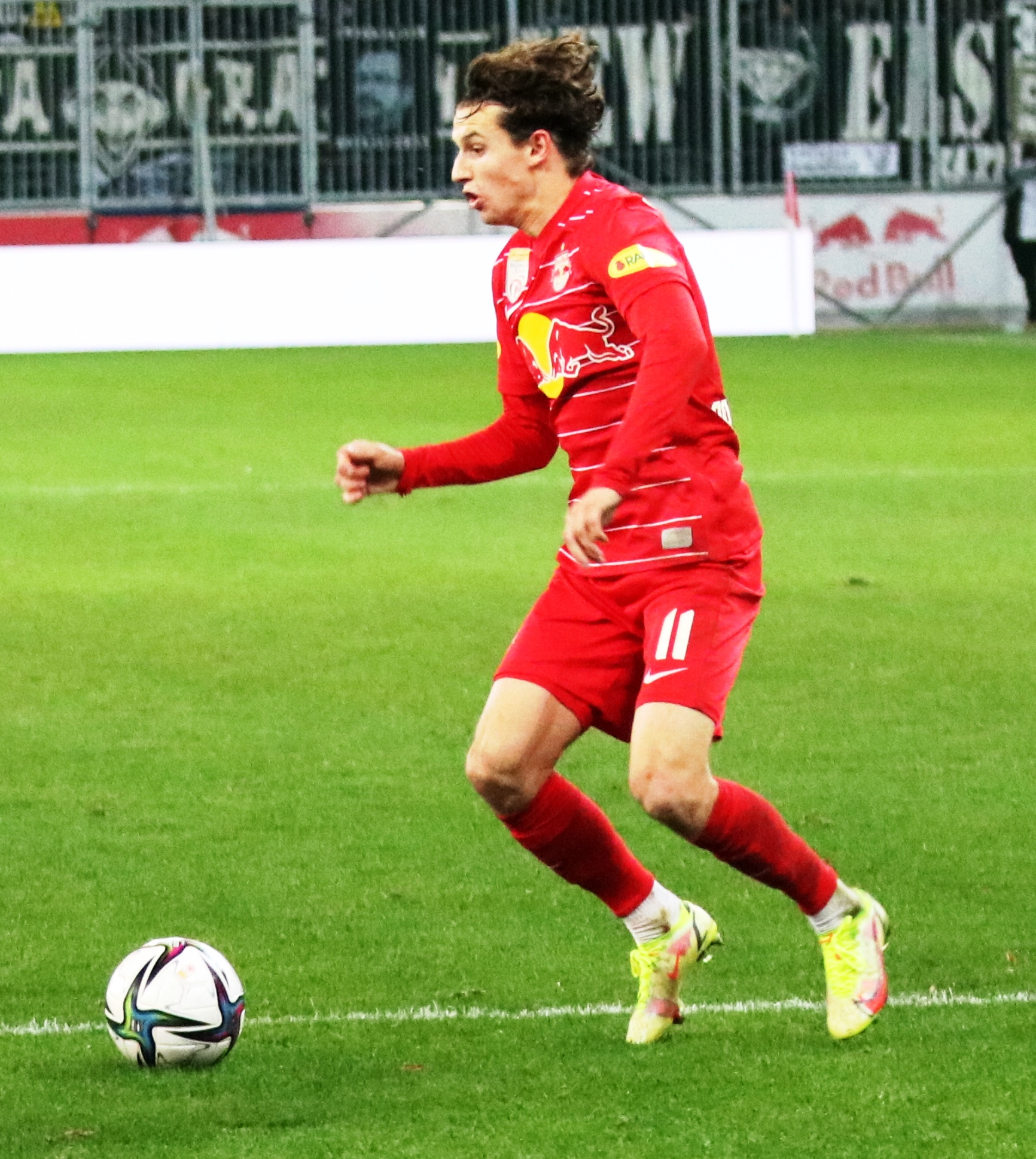
Aaronson playing for Red Bull Salzburg in 2021.

Aaronson scored his first goal for Salzburg on February 10, 2021, scoring the game-winning goal during an eventual 3–1 win over Austria Wien. On May 1, he won his first piece of silverware with Salzburg as the club defeated LASK in the Austrian Cup final by 3–0. Aaronson scored the second goal of the match, and his fifth in all competitions since his move from Philadelphia in January.

=== Leeds United ===
==== 2022–23: Debut season ====
On May 26, 2022, Leeds United announced the signing of Aaronson on a five-year contract, beginning on July 1. Sky Sports reported the transfer fee to be £24.7 million. He made his senior league debut for Leeds, in the number 7 shirt, as part of the starting eleven in their season opener on August 6, with a 2–1 home win over Wolverhampton Wanderers. On August 21, Aaronson scored his first Premier League goal after forcing an error from Chelsea goalkeeper Édouard Mendy in a 3–0 home win over rivals Chelsea, helping Leeds secure their first victory over the Blues for 20 years.

==== 2023–24: loan to Union Berlin ====
On July 9, 2023, following Leeds' relegation from the Premier League, Aaronson joined Bundesliga side Union Berlin on loan for the 2023–24 season.

==== Return to Leeds ====
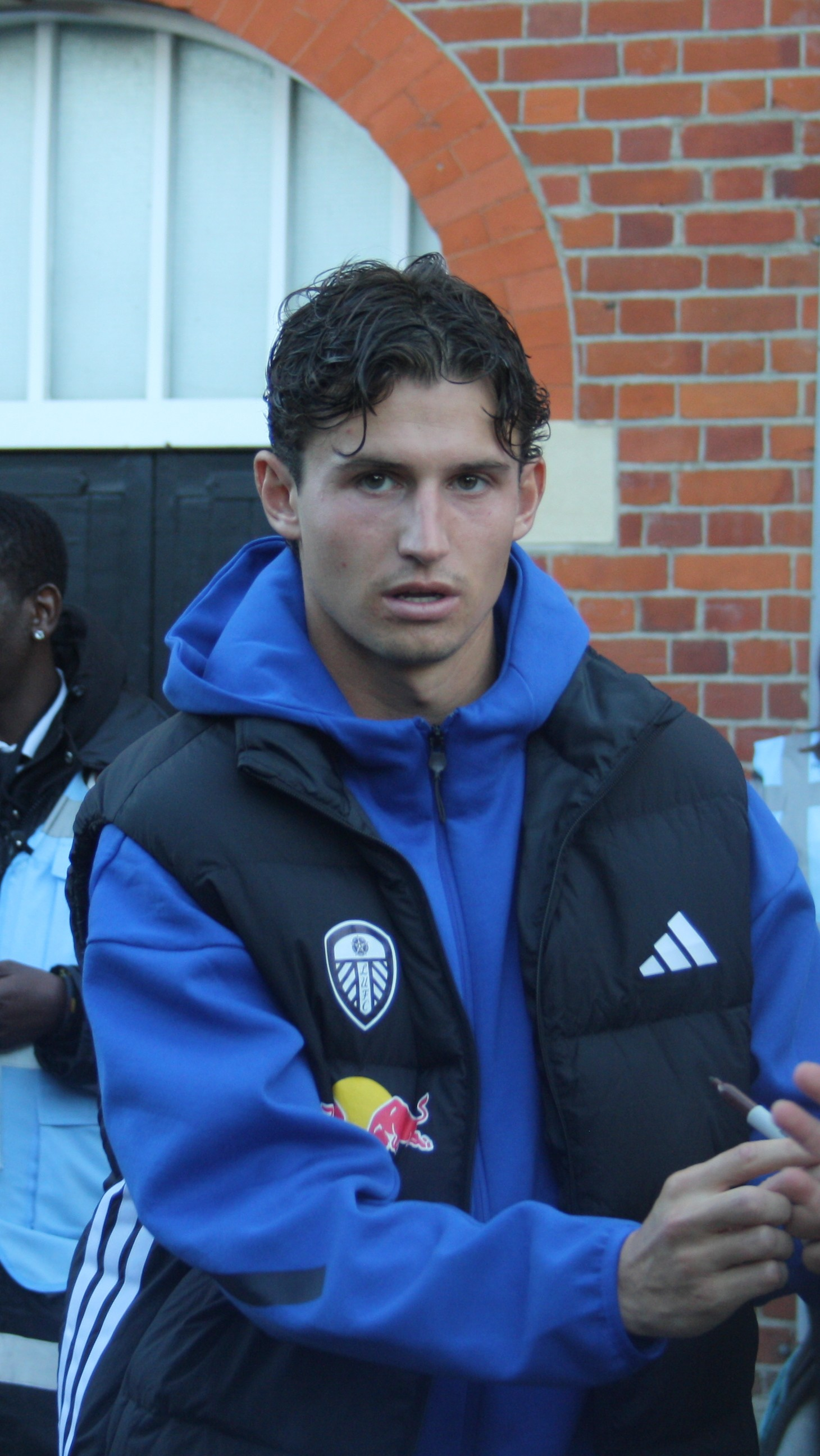
Aaronson signing autographs after the Leeds United's match against Fulham's match on September 13, 2025.

Aaronson returned to Elland Road for the 2024–25 season donning the number 11 top and putting in powerful performances in his five games in August, which featured him scoring twice in two league ties, including the added-time equaliser in the 10 August 3–3 season home opener against Portsmouth. His two goals plus his assists earned him the fans JD Sports Player of the Month Award for August 2024.

Aaronson finished the 2024–25 season with a career-high nine goals, adding two assists. On April 21, 2025, Aaronson was promoted back to the Premier League with Leeds following a 6–0 win over Stoke City at Elland Road and Sheffield United's 2–1 loss to Burnley at Turf Moor. On May 3, Aaronson won the EFL Championship title with Leeds following a 2–1 win over Plymouth Argyle at Home Park.

On January 7, 2026, Aaronson scored his first brace with Leeds United in a 4–3 loss to Newcastle at St James' Park.

On August 20, 2026, Aaronson signed a new three-year deal with Leeds United through the 2028-29 season.

== International career ==
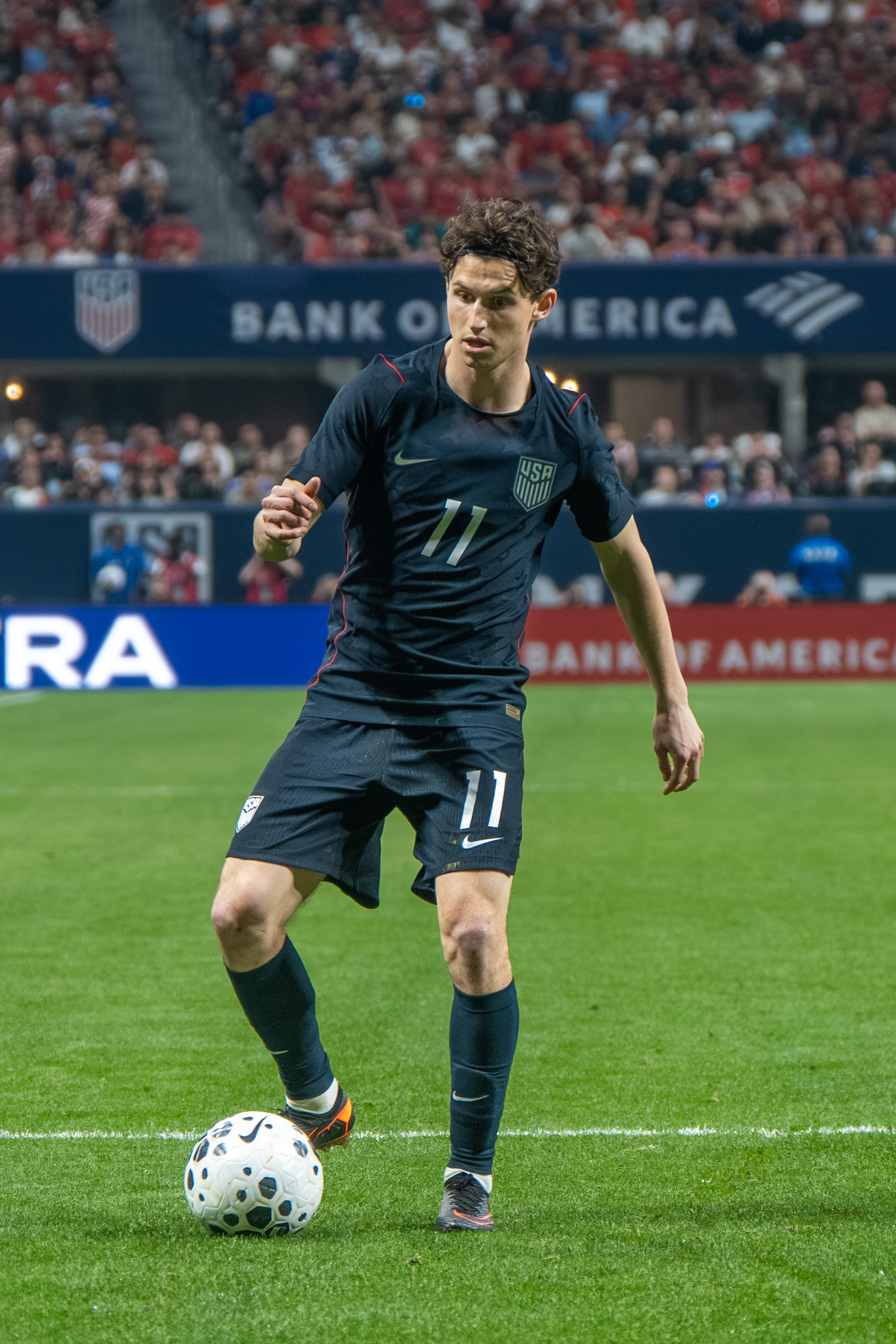
Aaronson with the United States in 2026

After showing a strong rookie season, Aaronson received his first senior call-up to the United States men's national soccer team in October 2019 for CONCACAF Nations League matches with Cuba and Canada. He did not earn a cap in either match. Aaronson earned his second call-up to the senior team for the 2020 January camp. Aaronson earned his full debut in a 1–0 win over Costa Rica. Later that year, Aaronson scored his first senior international goal during a 6–0 victory over El Salvador in December 2020.

Aaronson was included in the 26-man squad for the 2022 FIFA World Cup, playing in all three group games.

On May 26, 2026, Aaronson was selected in the 26-man squad for the 2026 FIFA World Cup.

== Personal life ==
His younger brother Paxten Aaronson is also a professional soccer player and plays for Major League Soccer club Colorado Rapids.

Aaronson's performances for the Philadelphia Union and Red Bull Salzburg earned him the nickname of the "Medford Messi", an alliteration that refers to his birthplace and makes a comparison with Argentine player Lionel Messi. He is a fan of the San Francisco 49ers, as his father is from Sacramento.

He became engaged to Milana D'Ambra in August 2024. They got married in 2026.

== Career statistics ==
=== Club ===
As of match played November 21, 2026

Appearances and goals by club, season and competition
Club	Season	League			National cup (Note: Includes U.S. Open Cup, Austrian Cup, FA Cup, DFB-Pokal)		League cup (Note: Includes MLS Cup playoffs, EFL Cup)		Continental		Other		Total	
Club	Season	Division	Apps	Goals	Apps	Goals	Apps	Goals	Apps	Goals	Apps	Goals	Apps	Goals
Bethlehem Steel FC	2017	USL	5	0	1	0	—		—		—		6	0
Bethlehem Steel FC	2018	USL	16	1	2	0	—		—		—		18	1
Bethlehem Steel FC	Total		21	1	3	0	—		—		—		24	1
Philadelphia Union	2019	MLS	28	3	0	0	2	0	—		—		30	3
Philadelphia Union	2020	MLS	23 (Note: Includes three appearances in MLS is Back Tournament group stage)	4	—		1	0	—		3 (Note: Appearances in MLS is Back Tournament knockout stage)	0	27	4
Philadelphia Union	Total		51	7	—		3	0	—		3	0	57	7
Red Bull Salzburg	2020–21	Austrian Bundesliga	20	5	3	2	—		2 (Note: Appearances in UEFA Europa League)	0	—		25	7
Red Bull Salzburg	2021–22	Austrian Bundesliga	26	4	5	0	—		10 (Note: Appearances in UEFA Champions League)	2	—		41	6
Red Bull Salzburg	Total		46	9	8	2	—		12	2	—		66	13
Leeds United	2022–23	Premier League	36	1	4	0	0	0	—		—		40	1
Leeds United	2024–25	Championship	46	9	0	0	1	0	—		—		47	9
Leeds United	2025–26	Premier League	37	4	4	0	1	0	—		—		42	4
Leeds United	2026–27	Premier League	9	1	0	0	2	1	—		—		11	2
Leeds United	Total		128	15	8	0	4	1	—		—		140	16
Union Berlin (loan)	2023–24	Bundesliga	30	2	2	0	—		6	0	—		38	2
Career total			276	34	21	2	7	1	18	2	3	0	325	39

=== International ===
As of match played June 25, 2026

Appearances and goals by national team and year
National team	Year	Apps	Goals
United States	2020	2	1
United States	2021	13	4
United States	2022	13	1
United States	2023	10	2
United States	2024	9	0
United States	2025	9	1
United States	2026	3	0
Total		59	9

United States score listed first, score column indicates score after each Aaronson goal.

International goals by date, venue, cap, opponent, score, result and competition
No.	Date	Venue	Cap	Opponent	Score	Result	Competition
1	December 9, 2020	Inter Miami CF Stadium, Fort Lauderdale, United States	2	El Salvador	6–0	6–0	Friendly
2	March 25, 2021	Stadion Wiener Neustadt, Wiener Neustadt, Austria	3	Jamaica	2–0	4–1	Friendly
3	June 9, 2021	Rio Tinto Stadium, Sandy, United States	7	Costa Rica	1–0	4–0	Friendly
4	September 5, 2021	Nissan Stadium, Nashville, United States	9	Canada	1–0	1–1	2022 FIFA World Cup qualification
5	September 8, 2021	Estadio Olímpico Metropolitano, San Pedro Sula, Honduras	10	Honduras	3–1	4–1	2022 FIFA World Cup qualification
6	June 1, 2022	TQL Stadium, Cincinnati, United States	19	Morocco	1–0	3–0	Friendly
7	March 24, 2023	Kirani James Athletic Stadium, St. George's, Grenada	29	Grenada	2–0	7–1	2022–23 CONCACAF Nations League A
8	September 12, 2023	Allianz Field, Saint Paul, United States	34	Oman	2–0	4–0	Friendly
9	June 15, 2025	PayPal Park, San Jose, United States	49	Trinidad and Tobago	4–0	5–0	2025 CONCACAF Gold Cup

== Honors ==
Philadelphia Union

- Supporters' Shield: 2020

Red Bull Salzburg

- Austrian Bundesliga: 2020–21, 2021–22
- Austrian Cup: 2020–21, 2021–22

Leeds United

- EFL Championship: 2024–25

United States

- CONCACAF Nations League: 2019–20, 2022–23, 2023–24

Individual

- MLS is Back Tournament Best XI: 2020
- MLS Best XI: 2020
