= Matej Oravec =

Slovak footballer (born 1998)

Personal information
- Full name: Matej Oravec
- Date of birth: 30 March 1998 (age 28)
- Place of birth: Trnava, Slovakia
- Height: 1.84 m (6 ft 0 in)
- Positions: Centre-back; defensive midfielder

Youth career
- Spartak Trnava

Senior career*
Years	Team	Apps	(Gls)
2016–2018	Spartak Trnava	38	(1)
2019	Železiarne Podbrezová	14	(1)
2019–2020	DAC Dunajská Streda	17	(0)
2020–2022	Philadelphia Union	0	(0)
2021–2022	→ Železiarne Podbrezová (loan)	29	(0)
2022–2026	Železiarne Podbrezová	46	(0)

International career^{‡}
2015–2016	Slovakia U18	7	(1)
2016–2017	Slovakia U19	10	(0)
2018	Slovakia U20	2	(0)
2019–2020	Slovakia U21	9	(1)
- * Club domestic league appearances and goals as of 1 January 2026 ‡ National team caps and goals as of 16 October 2020

Matej Oravec (born 30 March 1998) is a Slovak professional footballer who plays as a centre-back or defensive midfielder.

== Club career ==
=== Spartak Trnava ===
Oravec made his professional Fortuna Liga debut for Spartak Trnava against Podbrezová on 17 July 2016. He was nominated for the 2018 Golden Boy award after being part of the title-winning Trnava side in the 2017–18 season.

=== Philadelphia Union ===
On 20 January 2020, Oravec moved to MLS side Philadelphia Union. Having not played a minute for Union, he returned to Slovakia on a loan deal to Železiarne Podbrezová in July 2021. He made his move to Podbrezová permanent ahead of the 2022–23 season.

== Honours ==
Spartak Trnava

- Fortuna Liga: 2017–18
