= 2016 Philadelphia Union season =

Philadelphia Union
2016 season
- Owner: Keystone Sports & Entertainment
- Head coach: Jim Curtin
- Stadium: Talen Energy Stadium (Capacity: 18,500)
- MLS Cup Playoffs: Knockout round
- U.S. Open Cup: Quarterfinals
- Top goalscorer: League: Roland Alberg & Chris Pontius (6); All: Alberg & Pontius (8)
- Highest home attendance: 18,681 (Apr 23 vs. NYCFC)
- Lowest home attendance: League: 15,011 (Apr 8 vs. Orlando City SC); All: 12,881 (Jul 13 vs. Crystal Palace)
- Average home league attendance: League: 17,005; All: 16,630
Home colors	Away colors

The 2016 Philadelphia Union season was the seventh season of the Philadelphia Union in Major League Soccer, the top flight of American soccer. The team was managed by Jim Curtin, his third season with the club. The 2016 season marked the Union's second appearance in the MLS Cup Playoffs, the first time since the 2011 season.

== Background ==
=== 2016 MLS SuperDraft ===
Round	Pick	Name	Position	Nationality	School
1	2	Josh Yaro	Defender	Ghana	Georgetown
1	3	Keegan Rosenberry	Defender	United States	Georgetown
1	6	Fabian Herbers	Midfielder	Germany	Creighton
2	23	Taylor Washington	Defender	United States	George Mason
3	44	Mitchell Lurie	Defender	United States	Rutgers
4	64	Cole Missimo	Midfielder	United States	Northwestern

=== 2015 MLS regular season ===
The 2015 Philadelphia Union MLS regular season saw the team go 10–17–7, finishing 9th in the Eastern Conference and 18th overall. From the beginning of the season to the summer break, the Union went 4-9-3, including a four-game losing streak from April 19 to May 9. After the summer break, the Union fared only slightly better, going 6-8-4. The Union missed the MLS Cup Playoffs for the 4th consecutive season.

=== 2015 U.S. Open Cup ===
The 2015 U.S. Open Cup was the second year in a row in which the Union were runners-up in the U.S. Open Cup. The Union entered the competition in the fourth round along with the other 16 US-based MLS clubs. In that round, the Union defeated the Rochester Rhinos, a team in the USL, the third tier of the American soccer pyramid, 3-1 on penalty kicks after a 0-0 draw through extra time. In the next round, the Union defeated D.C. United 2-1. The Union then went on to defeat the New York Red Bulls 4-3 on penalty kicks, after a 1-1 draw aet. In the semifinals, the Union beat the Chicago Fire 1-0. In the final, the Union lost to Sporting Kansas City 6-7 on penalties, after going 1-1.

== 2016 roster ==
As of January 24, 2016.

Note: Flags indicate national team as defined under FIFA eligibility rules; some limited exceptions apply. Players may hold more than one non-FIFA nationality.

No.	Pos.	Nation	Player
1	GK	JAM	Andre Blake (GA)
2	MF	GUY	Warren Creavalle
3	DF	USA	Taylor Washington
4	DF	USA	Ken Tribbett
6	MF	NED	Roland Alberg
7	MF	USA	Brian Carroll (Captain)
8	MF	USA	Maurice Edu (DP)
9	FW	USA	Charlie Davies
10	MF	SUI	Tranquillo Barnetta
11	MF	USA	Alejandro Bedoya (DP)
12	DF	USA	Keegan Rosenberry
13	MF	USA	Chris Pontius
14	MF	GER	Fabian Herbers (GA)
15	DF	GHA	Josh Yaro (GA)
16	DF	USA	Richie Marquez

No.	Pos.	Nation	Player
17	FW	USA	C. J. Sapong
18	MF	CMR	Eric Ayuk Mbu
19	MF	USA	Cole Missimo
20	MF	COL	Wálter Restrepo
21	MF	USA	Derrick Jones (HGP)
22	MF	BRA	Leo Fernandes
23	MF	BRA	Anderson Conceição (on loan from Tombense)
24	GK	ENG	Matt Jones (on loan from Belenenses)
25	MF	BRA	Ilsinho
26	DF	USA	Auston Trusty (HGP)
27	GK	USA	John McCarthy
28	DF	USA	Ray Gaddis
32	MF	GER	Kevin Kratz
33	DF	BRA	Fabinho

== Squad breakdown ==
=== Current squad ===
No.	Name	Nationality	Position	Date of birth (age)	Signed from
Goalkeepers
1	Andre Blake (GA)	(Jamaica)	GK	November 21, 1990 (age 35)	(United States) UConn
24	Matt Jones	(England)	GK	May 11, 1986 (age 39)	(Portugal) Belenenses
27	John McCarthy	(United States)	GK	July 4, 1992 (age 33)	(United States) Rochester Rhinos
Defenders
3	Taylor Washington	(United States)	LB	August 16, 1993 (age 32)	(United States) George Mason University
4	Ken Tribbett	(United States)	CB	August 25, 1991 (age 34)	(United States) Bethlehem Steel FC
12	Keegan Rosenberry	(United States)	RB	December 11, 1993 (age 32)	(United States) Georgetown University
15	Joshua Yaro (INT, GA)	(Ghana)	CB	March 7, 1994 (age 32)	(United States) Georgetown University
16	Richie Marquez	(United States)	CB	May 26, 1992 (age 33)	(United States) University of Redlands
23	Anderson Conceição	(Brazil)	CB	October 24, 1989 (age 36)	(Brazil) Tombense Futebol Clube
26	Auston Trusty (HGP)	(United States)	CB	August 12, 1998 (age 27)	(United States) Bethlehem Steel FC
28	Ray Gaddis	(United States)	RB	January 13, 1990 (age 36)	(United States) West Virginia University
33	Fabinho	(Brazil)	LB	March 16, 1985 (age 41)	(Australia) Sydney FC
Midfielders
2	Warren Creavalle	(United States)	DM	August 14, 1990 (age 35)	(Canada) Toronto FC
6	Roland Alberg (INT)	(Netherlands)	CM	August 6, 1990 (age 35)	(Netherlands) ADO Den Haag
7	Brian Carroll	(United States)	DM	July 20, 1981 (age 44)	(United States) Columbus Crew SC
8	Maurice Edu (DP)	(United States)	DM	April 18, 1986 (age 40)	(England) Stoke City
10	Tranquillo Barnetta (INT)	(Switzerland)	CM	May 22, 1985 (age 40)	(Germany) Schalke 04
11	Alejandro Bedoya (DP)	(United States)	CM/RM	April 29, 1987 (age 39)	(France) FC Nantes
13	Chris Pontius	(United States)	LM	May 12, 1987 (age 38)	(United States) D.C. United
14	Eric Ayuk Mbu (INT)	(Cameroon)	LM/RM	February 17, 1997 (age 29)	(Cameroon) Rainbow FC Bamenda
19	Cole Missimo	(United States)	MF	February 15, 1993 (age 33)	(United States) Northwestern Wildcats
21	Derrick Jones (HGP)	(Ghana)	MF	March 3, 1997 (age 29)	(United States) Bethlehem Steel FC
22	Leo Fernandes	(Brazil)	RM	December 23, 1991 (age 34)	(United States) Reading United A.C.
25	Ilsinho (INT)	(Brazil)	CM/RM	October 12, 1985 (age 40)	(Ukraine) Shakhtar Donetsk
Forwards
9	Charlie Davies	(United States)	CF	June 25, 1986 (age 39)	(United States) New England Revolution
14	Fabian Herbers (INT, GA)	(Germany)	CF	August 17, 1993 (age 32)	(United States) Creighton University
17	C.J. Sapong	(United States)	CF	December 27, 1988 (age 37)	(United States) Sporting Kansas City

Last updated: January 24, 2016.
Source: Philadelphia Union

DP indicates Designated Player
GA indicates Generation Adidas Player
HGP indicates Home Grown Player
INT indicates MLS International Player and qualifies for an international roster spot

== Competitions ==
=== Preseason ===
February 6, 2016 Preseason	Jacksonville Armada FC	1–0	Philadelphia Union	Jacksonville, Florida
6:00 p.m. EST	Eloundou 80'	Report	Alberg (yellow card) 22'	Stadium: Community First Park; Referee: Hilario Grajeda

February 9, 2016 Preseason	Philadelphia Union	5–0	U-17 U.S. Men's National Team	Clearwater, Florida
10:30 a.m. EST	Creavalle; Le Toux (pen.); Sapong; Fernandes	Report		Stadium: Joe DiMaggio Sports Complex

February 11, 2016 Preseason	Philadelphia Union	2–4	Chicago Fire	Clearwater, Florida
3:00 p.m. EST	Herbers 16'; Missimo 83'	Report	Accam 14' (pen.) 40'; LaBrocca 60'; Gilberto 64'	Stadium: Joe DiMaggio Sports Complex

February 17, 2016 Preseason	D.C. United	1–1	Philadelphia Union	St. Petersburg, Florida
4:00 p.m. EST	Espindola 56' (pen.)	Report	Le Toux 7'	Stadium: Al Lang Stadium

February 20, 2016 Preseason	Tampa Bay Rowdies	0–2	Philadelphia Union	St. Petersburg, Florida
7:00 p.m. EST	Sweat (yellow card) 1'	Report	Tribbett 17'; Fernandes 29'; Anderson (yellow card) 58'; Restrepo (yellow card) 79'	Stadium: Al Lang Stadium; Referee: Jorge Gonzalez

February 24, 2016 Preseason	Philadelphia Union	0–0	New York Red Bulls	Clearwater, Florida
7:00 p.m. EST	Le Toux (yellow card) 28'; Ilsinho (yellow card) 29' (yellow-red card) 44'; Carroll (yellow card) 32'; Nogueira (yellow card) 42'; Alberg (yellow card) 74'	Report	Kljestan (yellow card) 31'	Stadium: Joe DiMaggio Sports Complex

February 27, 2016 Preseason	Philadelphia Union	1–0	Toronto FC	St. Petersburg, Florida
4:00 p.m. EST	Sapong 60'	Report	Bradley (yellow card) 33'; Bloom (yellow card) 38'; Moor (yellow card) 79'	Stadium: Al Lang Stadium

Source: MLS

=== MLS season ===
March 6, 2016 Regular Season	FC Dallas	2–0	Philadelphia Union	Frisco, Texas
3:00 p.m. EST	Castillo 22'; Hedges (yellow card) 71'; Urruti 74'	Report; Box Score	Carroll (yellow card) 34'	Stadium: Toyota Stadium; Attendance: 14,248; Referee: Mark Geiger

March 12, 2016 Regular Season	Columbus Crew SC	1–2	Philadelphia Union	Columbus, Ohio
7:30 p.m. EST	Kamara 87'	Report; Box Score	Pontius 45+1', 71'; Fabinho (yellow card) 56'; Carroll (yellow card) 65'	Stadium: MAPFRE Stadium; Attendance: 17,015; Referee: Hilario Grajeda

March 20, 2016 Regular Season	Philadelphia Union	3–0	New England Revolution	Chester, Pennsylvania
2:30 p.m. EDT	Sapong 18', 33'; Fabinho (yellow card) 25'; Le Toux 90+3'	Report; Box Score	Watson (red card) 36'; Tierney (yellow card) 57'; Fagundez (yellow card) 57'	Stadium: Talen Energy Stadium; Attendance: 17,027; Referee: Nima Saghafi

April 2, 2016 Regular Season	Chicago Fire	1–0	Philadelphia Union	Bridgeview, Illinois
5:00 p.m. EDT	Ramos (yellow card) 37'; Igboananike 51'; Polster (yellow card) 72'	Report; Box Score	Creavalle (yellow card) 13' (red card) 47'	Stadium: Toyota Park; Attendance: 12,073; Referee: Silviu Petrescu

April 8, 2016 Regular Season	Philadelphia Union	2–1	Orlando City SC	Chester, Pennsylvania
7:00 p.m. EDT	Sapong 2'; Fabinho (yellow card) 30'; Barnetta 90'	Report; Box Score	Winter 43'	Stadium: Talen Energy Stadium; Attendance: 15,011; Referee: Jair Marrufo

April 16, 2016 Regular Season	Seattle Sounders FC	2–1	Philadelphia Union	Seattle, Washington
10:00 p.m. EDT	Marshall 41'; Remick (yellow card) 55'; Morris 71'; Valdez (yellow card) 88'; Alonso (yellow card) 90+5'	Report; Box Score	Alberg (yellow card) 32' (yellow-red card) 53'; Fabinho (yellow card) 34'; Le Toux 73'; Fernandes (yellow card) 87'	Stadium: CenturyLink Field; Attendance: 39,620; Referee: Drew Fischer

April 23, 2016 Regular Season	Philadelphia Union	2–0	New York City FC	Chester, Pennsylvania
4:00 p.m. EDT	Pontius 26'; Fabinho (yellow card) 36'; Sapong 41'; Creavalle (yellow card) 90+1'	Report; Box Score	Lopez (yellow card) 16'; Villa (yellow card) 69'; Bravo (yellow card) 89'	Stadium: Talen Energy Stadium; Attendance: 18,681; Referee: Jose Carlos Rivero

April 30, 2016 Regular Season	Philadelphia Union	1–1	San Jose Earthquakes	Chester, Pennsylvania
4:00 p.m. EDT	Pontius 30'	Report; Box Score	Alashe (yellow card) 31'; Godoy (yellow card) 35' (yellow-red card) 59'; Dawkins 83'	Stadium: Talen Energy Stadium; Attendance: 16,079; Referee: Ricardo Salazar

May 11, 2016 Regular Season	Philadelphia Union	2–2	LA Galaxy	Chester, Pennsylvania
7:00 p.m. EDT	Nogueira 4'; Rosenberry 63'	Report; Box Score	Rogers 15' (yellow card) 70'; Magee 47'; Kennedy (yellow card) 82'	Stadium: Talen Energy Stadium; Attendance: 17,985; Referee: Sorin Stoica

May 14, 2016 Regular Season	Montreal Impact	1–1	Philadelphia Union	Montreal, Quebec
5:00 p.m. EDT	Drogba 3'; Piatti (yellow card) 36'; Donadel (yellow card) 50'; Oyongo (yellow card) 80'	Report; Box Score	Sapong 24'; Gaddis (yellow card) 81'	Stadium: Saputo Stadium; Attendance: 20,801; Referee: Drew Fischer

May 20, 2016 Regular Season	Philadelphia Union	1–0	D.C. United	Chester, Pennsylvania
7:00 p.m. EDT	Barnetta (yellow card) 80'; Gaddis (yellow card) 82'; Marquez 90+1', (yellow card) 90+2'	Report; Box Score	Nyarko (yellow card) 45+1'; Birnbaum (yellow card) 53'	Stadium: Talen Energy Stadium; Attendance: 17,364; Referee: Jaime Herrera

May 25, 2016 Regular Season	Orlando City SC	2–2	Philadelphia Union	Orlando, Florida
7:30 p.m. EDT	Kaká (yellow card) 32'; Rivas (yellow card) 64'; Molino 68'; Larin 71'; Carrasco (yellow card) 76'; Higuita (yellow card) 89'; Mateos (red card) 90+3'	Report; Box Score	Le Toux (yellow card) 33'; Barnetta 52', (yellow card) 72'; Tibbett 75'	Stadium: Citrus Bowl; Attendance: 24,109; Referee: Sorin Stoica

May 28, 2016 Regular Season	Colorado Rapids	1–1	Philadelphia Union	Commerce City, Colorado
9:00 p.m. EDT	Cronin 87'	Report; Box Score	Carroll 90+2'	Stadium: Dick's Sporting Goods Park; Attendance: 18,015; Referee: Hilari Grajeda

June 1, 2016 Regular Season	Philadelphia Union	3–2	Columbus Crew SC	Chester, Pennsylvania
7:00 p.m. EDT	Pontius 21'; Tribbett (yellow card) 32'; Nogueira 57', (yellow card) 69'; Le Toux (yellow card) 64'; Herbers 84'	Report; Box Score	Kamara 14'; Finlay (yellow card) 43'; Casey (red card) 77'; Martinez 90+3'	Stadium: Talen Energy Stadium; Attendance: 15,543; Referee: Robert Sibiga

June 18, 2016 Regular Season	New York City FC	3–2	Philadelphia Union	New York City, New York
1:00 p.m. EDT	Lampard 8', (yellow card) 43'; Villa 21'; Allen (yellow card) 45'; Pirlo 50'; Hernandez (yellow card) 54' (yellow-red card) 85'; Matarrita (yellow card) 90+5'	Report; Box Score	Barnetta (yellow card) 31'; Gaddis (yellow card) 49'; Alberg 55' (pen.); Brillant 88' (o.g.)	Stadium: Yankee Stadium; Attendance: 27,456; Referee: Silviu Petrescu

June 22, 2016 Regular Season	Philadelphia Union	4–3	Chicago Fire	Chester, Pennsylvania
7:00 p.m. EDT	Campbell 11' (o.g.); Alberg 15', 45+1', 56' (pen.), (yellow card) 58'; Carroll (yellow card) 36'; Tribbett (yellow card) 37'	Report; Box Score	Accam 2'; Cocis 69'; Thiam 80'; Campbell (yellow card) 85'	Stadium: Talen Energy Stadium; Attendance: 16,667; Referee: Jaime Herrera

June 25, 2016 Regular Season	Philadelphia Union	2–3	Vancouver Whitecaps FC	Chester, Pennsylvania
7:00 p.m. EDT	Alberg 14'; Barnetta (yellow card) 36'; Pontius 90+4'	Report; Box Score	Jacobson 19'; Manneh 41', (yellow card) 51'; Bolaños 84'	Stadium: Talen Energy Stadium; Attendance: 17,225; Referee: Armand Villarreal

July 2, 2016 Regular Season	Houston Dynamo	1–0	Philadelphia Union	Houston, Texas
9:00 p.m. EDT	Maidana 90+5'	Report; Box Score	Yaro (yellow card) 2' (yellow-red card) 87'; Creavalle (yellow card) 90+4'	Stadium: BBVA Compass Stadium; Attendance: 18,457; Referee: Edvin Jurisevic

July 9, 2016 Regular Season	Philadelphia Union	3–0	D.C. United	Chester, Pennsylvania
7:00 p.m. EDT	Alberg 20' (pen.); Ilsinho 37' (pen.), 47'	Report; Box Score	Kofi Opare (yellow card) 19' (yellow-red card) 65'	Stadium: Talen Energy Stadium; Attendance: 18,463; Referee: Sorin Stoica

July 17, 2016 Regular Season	Philadelphia Union	2–2	New York Red Bulls	Chester, Pennsylvania
7:00 p.m. EDT	Carroll (yellow card) 36'; Ilsinho (yellow card) 43' (red card) 72'; Sapong 67' (pen.); Pontius 68'	Report; Box Score	Kljestan 27', 44'; Zizzo (yellow card) 66'; Lade (yellow card) 72'	Stadium: Talen Energy Stadium; Attendance: 18,500; Referee: Alan Kelly

July 23, 2016 Regular Season	Montreal Impact	5–1	Philadelphia Union	Montreal, Quebec
TBD	Drogba 19', 42', 52'; Salazar (yellow card) 26'; Mallace (yellow card) 50'; Bernier (yellow card) 83'; Piatti 87'; Mancosu 90+1'	Report; Box Score	Barnetta (yellow card) 27'; Pontius 72'; Gaddis (yellow card) 76'	Stadium: Saputo Stadium; Attendance: 20,801; Referee: Ismail Elfath

July 31, 2016 Regular Season	Philadelphia Union	1–2	Real Salt Lake	Chester, Pennsylvania
7:00 p.m. EDT	Fabinho (yellow card) 21'; Alberg 44' (pen.); Carroll (yellow card) 90'	Report; Box Score	Maund (yellow card) 42'; Plata 48'; Morales 54', (yellow card) 55'	Stadium: Talen Energy Stadium; Attendance: 18,091; Referee: Juan Guzman

August 6, 2016 Regular Season	D.C. United	2–2	Philadelphia Union	Washington, D.C.
7:00 p.m. EDT	Kemp 16'; Acosta (yellow card) 58'; Birnbaum 90+4'	Report; Box Score	Marquez (yellow card) 5'; Barnetta 45+1'; Pontius 57'; Tribbett (yellow card) 63'	Stadium: RFK Stadium; Attendance: 16,392; Referee: Jair Marrufo

August 13, 2016 Regular Season	New England Revolution	0–4	Philadelphia Union	Foxborough, Massachusetts
7:30 p.m. EDT	Caldwell (yellow card) 18'; Kamara (yellow card) 41'	Report; Box Score	Sapong 2'; Pontius 51'; Marquez 54'; Herbers (yellow card) 80'; Alberg 90+3'	Stadium: Gillette Stadium; Attendance: 17,127; Referee: Robert Sibiga

August 20, 2016 Regular Season	Philadelphia Union	1–3	Toronto FC	Chester, Pennsylvania
7:00 p.m. EDT	Tribbett 24'; Barnetta (yellow card) 67'; Yaro (yellow card) 73'	Report; Box Score	Giovinco 18'; Moor 30', (yellow card) 40'; Morrow (yellow card) 42'; Altidore 44'; Johnson (yellow card) 45'; Bradley (yellow card) 58'	Stadium: Talen Energy Stadium; Attendance: 18,271; Referee: Mark Geiger

August 24, 2016 Regular Season	Columbus Crew SC	1–2	Philadelphia Union	Columbus, Ohio
7:30 p.m. EDT	Jahn 73'	Report; Box Score	Herbers 60'; Rosenberry 74'; Bedoya (yellow card) 78'	Stadium: MAPFRE Stadium; Attendance: 13,114; Referee: Radu Petrescu

August 27, 2016 Regular Season	Philadelphia Union	2–0	Sporting Kansas City	Chester, Pennsylvania
7:00 p.m. EDT	Creavalle (yellow card) 51'; Alberg 67'; Barnetta 90+2'; Bedoya (yellow card) 90+3'	Report; Box Score	Medranda (yellow card) 20' (yellow-red card) 59'; Espinoza (yellow card) 20' (red card) 87'	Stadium: Talen Energy Stadium; Attendance: 17,911; Referee: Juan Guzman

September 3, 2016 Regular Season	Chicago Fire	3–0	Philadelphia Union	Bridgeview, Illinois
8:30 p.m. EDT	Meira (yellow card) 58'; Cocis (yellow card) 61'; Kappelhof (yellow card) 64' de Leeuw 71'; Alvarez 90'	Report; Box Score	Alberg 22' (o.g.)	Stadium: Toyota Park; Attendance: 16,102; Referee: Ted Unkel

September 10, 2016 Regular Season	Philadelphia Union	1–1	Montreal Impact	Chester, Pennsylvania
7:00 p.m. EDT	Pontius (yellow card) 34'; Barnetta 45'; Sapong (yellow card) 54'	Report; Box Score	Ciman (yellow card) 48'; Camara (yellow card) 60'; Mancosu 88'	Stadium: Talen Energy Stadium; Attendance: 18,500; Referee: Armand Villarreal

September 17, 2016 Regular Season	Portland Timbers	2–1	Philadelphia Union	Portland, Oregon
6:00 p.m. EDT	Valeri 46'; Adi 53'	Report; Box Score	Yaro (yellow card) 25' (yellow-red card) 85'; Bedoya (yellow card) 35'; Pontius 47'; Carroll (yellow card) 78'	Stadium: Providence Park; Attendance: 21,144; Referee: Chris Penso

September 24, 2016 Regular Season	Toronto FC	1–1	Philadelphia Union	Toronto, Ontario
5:00 p.m. EDT	Johnson (yellow card) 24'; Morrow 70'; Altidore (yellow card) 90+4'	Report; Box Score	Bedoya 25'; Marquez (yellow card) 66'	Stadium: BMO Field; Attendance: 26,455; Referee: Ismail Elfath

October 1, 2016 Regular Season	New York Red Bulls	3–2	Philadelphia Union	Harrison, New Jersey
7:00 p.m. EDT	Kljestan 44'; Wright-Phillips 47'; Perrinelle (yellow card) 58'; McCarty 66'	Report; Box Score	Herbers 15', (yellow card) 59'; Pontius 55', (yellow card) 88'; Barnetta (yellow card) 72'	Stadium: Red Bull Arena; Attendance: 22,731; Referee: Jose Carlos Rivero

October 16, 2016 Regular Season	Philadelphia Union	0–2	Orlando City SC	Chester, Pennsylvania
5:00 p.m. EDT	Marquez (yellow card) 38'; Herbers (yellow card) 44'; Barnetta (yellow card) 67'	Report; Box Score	Aja (yellow card) 56'; Rivas 59'; Baptista 90+5'	Stadium: Talen Energy Stadium; Attendance: 18,007; Referee: Ricard Salazar

October 23, 2016 Regular Season	Philadelphia Union	0–2	New York Red Bulls	Chester, Pennsylvania
4:00 p.m. EDT	Ilsinho (yellow card) 22'; Creavalle (yellow card) 45+1'; Tribbett (yellow card) 78'	Report; Box Score	Grella (yellow card) 22'; Wright-Phillips 26'; Perrinelle (yellow card) 54'; Muyl 57'	Stadium: Talen Energy Stadium; Attendance: 18,500; Referee: Kevin Stott

=== MLS Cup playoffs ===
October 26, 2016 MLS Cup Playoffs	Toronto FC	3–1	Philadelphia Union	Toronto, Ontario
7:30 p.m. EDT	Bradley (yellow card) 14'; Giovinco 15'; Altidore (yellow card) 45+1', (goal) 85'; Osorio 48'	Report; Box Score	Sapong (yellow card) 25'; Bedoya (yellow card) 43', (goal) 73'; Tribbett (yellow card) 90'	Stadium: BMO Field; Attendance: 21,759; Referee: Baldom Toledo

== Statistics ==
Statistics are from all MLS league matches as documented by MLSsoccer.com.

Nat.	No.	Player	Pos.	Apps	Starts	G	A	Booked	Sent off (straight red)	Acquired
(United States)	2	Warren Creavalle	CM	27	21	0	1	5	1	Trade
(United States)	3	Taylor Washington	CB	0	0	0	0	0	0	SuperDraft
(United States)	4	Ken Tribbett	CB	22	19	2	1	4	0	Signed
(France)	5	Vincent Nogueira†	DM	8	8	2	0	1	0	Signed
(Netherlands)	6	Roland Alberg	CM	28	13	9	3	2	1	Signed
(United States)	7	Brian Carroll	DM	26	23	1	0	6	0	Trade
(United States)	8	Maurice Edu	DM	0	0	0	0	0	0	Signed
(France)	9	Sebastien Le Toux†	LM/RM	18	12	2	5	2	0	Trade
(United States)	9	Charlie Davies	CF/CF	8	0	0	1	0	0	Trade
(Switzerland)	10	Tranquillo Barnetta	CM	29	25	5	4	8	0	Signed
(United States)	11	Alejandro Bedoya	MF	10	10	1	0	3	0	Signed
(United States)	12	Keegan Rosenberry	RB	34	34	2	2	0	0	SuperDraft
(United States)	13	Chris Pontius	LM	33	32	12	6	2	0	Trade
(Germany)	14	Fabian Herbers	CF	21	13	3	7	4	3	SuperDraft
(Ghana)	15	Joshua Yaro	LB/CB	17	15	0	0	3	2	SuperDraft
(United States)	16	Richie Marquez	CB	33	33	2	0	4	0	SuperDraft
(United States)	17	CJ Sapong	CF	31	29	7	2	1	0	Trade
(Cameroon)	18	Eric Ayuk Mbu	LM/RM	1	1	0	0	0	0	Signed
(United States)	19	Cole Missimo	MF	0	0	0	0	0	0	Signed
(Colombia)	20	Walter Restrepo	LM	4	0	0	1	0	0	Signed
(United States)	21	Derrick Jones	MF	0	0	0	0	0	0	Homegrown
(Brazil)	22	Leo Fernandes	RM	12	2	0	1	1	0	SuperDraft
(Brazil)	23	Anderson	CB	1	1	0	0	0	0	Loan
(Brazil)	25	Ilsinho	CM/RM	25	14	2	2	2	1	Signed
(United States)	26	Auston Trusty	CB	0	0	0	0	0	0	Homegrown
(United States)	28	Ray Gaddis	RB	7	5	0	1	4	0	SuperDraft
(Brazil)	33	Fabinho	LB	29	29	0	6	6	0	Signed
Total						50	42	57	8	

Players with names marked † left the club during the playing season.
Players with names in italics were loaned players.

=== Goalkeepers ===
Nat.	No.	Player	Apps	Starts	Record	GA	GAA	SO	Booked	Sent off (straight red)	Acquired
(Jamaica)	1	Andre Blake	32	32	10–13–9	50	1.56	6	0	0	SuperDraft
(England)	24	Matt Jones	1	1	1–0–0	2	2.00	0	0	0	Loan
(United States)	27	John McCarthy	1	1	0–1–0	3	3.00	0	0	0	Signed
Total			34	34	11–14–9	55	1.61	6	0	0	

Record = W-L-D

=== Standings ===
==== Eastern Conference standings ====
Pos	Team	Pld	W	L	T	GF	GA	GD	Pts	Qualification
4	D.C. United	34	11	10	13	53	47	+6	46	MLS Cup Knockout Round
5	Montreal Impact	34	11	11	12	49	53	−4	45	MLS Cup Knockout Round
6	Philadelphia Union	34	11	14	9	52	55	−3	42	MLS Cup Knockout Round
7	New England Revolution	34	11	14	9	44	54	−10	42	
8	Orlando City SC	34	9	11	14	55	60	−5	41	

Source: MLS

==== Overall standings ====
Pos	Team	Pld	W	L	T	GF	GA	GD	Pts
11	Montreal Impact	34	11	11	12	49	53	−4	45
12	Portland Timbers	34	12	14	8	48	53	−5	44
13	Philadelphia Union	34	11	14	9	52	55	−3	42
14	New England Revolution	34	11	14	9	44	54	−10	42
15	Orlando City SC	34	9	11	14	55	60	−5	41

Source: MLS
Rules for classification: 1) points; 2) total wins; 3) total goal differential; 4) total goals scored;

=== U.S. Open Cup ===
June 15, 2016 Fourth round	Philadelphia Union	3–2	Harrisburg City Islanders	Chester, Pennsylvania
7:00 PM	Restrepo 3'; Marquez (yellow card) 19'; Creavalle (yellow card) 32'; Alberg 45+1', 90+3'	Recap; Box Score	Foster 79'; Benbow (yellow card) 81'; Johnson (yellow card) 84'; Barril (red card) 88'; Warshaw 90+1'	Stadium: Talen Energy Stadium; Referee: Sorin Stoica

June 29, 2016 Round of 16	Philadelphia Union	2–1	New York Red Bulls	Chester, Pennsylvania
7:00 PM	Pontius 55', 60'; Ilsinho (yellow card) 56'; Fernandes (yellow card) 90+4'	PHI Report	Grella 17'; Zizzo (yellow card) 51'	Stadium: Talen Energy Stadium; Referee: Mark Kadlecik

July 20, 2016 Quarterfinals	New England Revolution	1–1 (a.e.t.) (4–2 p)	Philadelphia Union	Boston, Massachusetts
7:30 PM	Sambinha (yellow card) 13'; Watson 44', (yellow card) 109'	Report; Box Score	Creavalle (yellow card) 28'; Herbers 90'	Stadium: Harvard Stadium
	Penalties
	Nguyen (penalty scored); Tierney (penalty scored); Caldwell (penalty missed); Gonçalves (penalty scored); Watson (penalty scored)		(penalty missed) Le Toux; (penalty scored) Ilsinho; (penalty missed) Sapong; (penalty scored) Herbers

=== Friendlies ===
July 13, 2016 Friendly	Philadelphia Union	0–0	Crystal Palace	Chester, Pennsylvania
7:00 p.m. EDT	Anderson (yellow card) 86'	Report	Boateng (yellow card) 36'	Stadium: Talen Energy Stadium; Attendance: 12,881; Referee: Hilario Grajeda

== Transfers ==
=== In ===
Date	Player	Number	Position	Previous club	Fee/notes
December 7, 2015	(United States) Chris Pontius	13	LM	(United States) D.C. United	Traded for general and targeted allocation money
January 12, 2016	(Colombia) Wálter Restrepo	20	LM	(United States) New York Cosmos	Undisclosed transfer fee
January 14, 2016	(Ghana) Joshua Yaro	15	LB/CB	(United States) Georgetown University	2016 MLS SuperDraft
January 14, 2016	(United States) Keegan Rosenberry	12	RB	(United States) Georgetown University	2016 MLS SuperDraft
January 14, 2016	(Germany) Fabian Herbers	11	CF	(United States) Creighton University	2016 MLS SuperDraft
February 4, 2016	(Netherlands) Roland Alberg	6	CM	(Netherlands) ADO Den Haag	Undisclosed transfer fee
February 23, 2016	(United States) Ken Tribbett	4	CB	(United States) Bethlehem Steel	Free
February 24, 2016	(Brazil) Ilsinho	25	CM/RM	(Ukraine) Shakhtar Donetsk	Free
July 27, 2016	(Ghana) Derrick Jones	21	MF	(United States) Bethlehem Steel	Signed as a Homegrown Player
August 3, 2016	(United States) Alejandro Bedoya	9	MF	(France) FC Nantes	Signed as a Designated Player
August 4, 2016	(United States) Charlie Davies	11	FW	(United States) New England Revolution	Acquired in exchange for General and Targeted Allocation Money, and a first round pick in the 2018 MLS SuperDraft

=== Out ===
Date	Player	Number	Position	New club	Fee/notes
December 7, 2015	(Argentina) Cristian Maidana	10	AM/MF	(United States) Houston Dynamo	Traded for allocation money and a 2016 SuperDraft pick
December 7, 2015	(United States) Andrew Wenger	11	LW/ST	(United States) Houston Dynamo	Traded for allocation money and a 2016 SuperDraft pick
December 10, 2015	(Bosnia and Herzegovina) Dzenan Catic	19	FW	(United States) Rio Grande Valley FC Toros	Option declined
December 10, 2015	(United States) Danny Cruz	44	FW	(United States) Minnesota United FC	Option declined
December 10, 2015	(Brazil) Fred Carreiro	77	MF	(United States) Bethlehem Steel FC	Option declined
December 10, 2015	(United States) Conor Casey	6	FW	(United States) Columbus Crew SC	Option declined
December 10, 2015	(United States) Antoine Hoppenot	29	FW	(United States) FC Cincinnati	Option declined
December 10, 2015	(United States) Ethan White	15	DM	(United States) New York City FC	Traded for 2016 MLS SuperDraft pick
December 10, 2015	(Canada) Steven Vitória	23	CB	(Portugal) S.L. Benfica	Option declined
December 10, 2015	(United States) Eric Bird	21	MF	(United States) Rio Grande Valley FC Toros	Option declined
December 10, 2015	(United States) Jimmy McLaughlin	20	LW/RW	(United States) FC Cincinnati	Option declined
December 11, 2015	(United States) Zac MacMath	18	GK	(United States) Colorado Rapids	Traded for 2016 MLS SuperDraft pick
January 15, 2016	(United States) Zach Pfeffer	18	MF	(United States) Colorado Rapids	Traded for 2016 MLS SuperDraft pick
May 24, 2016	(Sierra Leone) Michael Lahoud	13	MF	(United States) Miami FC	Undisclosed Transfer Fee
June 16, 2016	(France) Vincent Nogueira	5	DM	(France) RC Strasbourg	Mutually Terminated Contract
August 3, 2016	(France) Sébastien Le Toux	9	MF	(United States) Colorado Rapids	Traded for General Allocation Money

=== Loan in ===
Date	Player	Number	Position	Loaned from
January 13, 2016	(Brazil) Anderson Conceição	23	CB	(Brazil) Tombense Futebol Clube
February 9, 2016	(England) Matt Jones		GK	(Portugal) Belenenses

=== Loan out ===
Date	Player	Number	Position	Loaned to
January 12, 2015	(Sierra Leone) Michael Lahoud	13	MF	(United States) New York Cosmos

== Honors and awards ==
=== MLS Player of the Week ===
Week	Player	Stats
14	(United States) Chris Pontius	1G 1A
16	(Netherlands) Roland Alberg	4G
18	(Brazil) Ilsinho	2G

=== MLS Goal of the Week ===
Week	Player	Link
14	(United States) Chris Pontius	

=== MLS Save of the Week ===
Week	Player	Link
16	(Jamaica) Andre Blake	

=== MLS All-Stars 2016 ===
Position	Player	Notes
GK	(Jamaica) Andre Blake	Starting XI
DF	(United States) Keegan Rosenberry	Starting XI

=== End of Season Awards ===
Player	Country	Award	Notes	Ref
Andre Blake	(Jamaica)	MLS Goalkeeper of the Year	First to win award in club history	
Keegan Rosenberry	(United States)	MLS Fair Play Award		
Chris Pontius	(United States)	MLS Comeback Player of the Year Award		
