= 2017 Philadelphia Union season =

Philadelphia Union
2017 season
- Owner: Keystone Sports & Entertainment
- Head coach: Jim Curtin
- Stadium: Talen Energy Stadium (Capacity: 18,500)
- MLS: Conference: 8th Overall: 16th
- MLS Cup Playoffs: Did not qualify
- U.S. Open Cup: Round of 16
- Top goalscorer: League: C.J. Sapong (16); All: Sapong (21)
- Highest home attendance: 18,619; September 23 vs. Chicago
- Lowest home attendance: League: 15,107; April 22 vs. Montreal; All: 3,866; June 14 vs. Harrisburg
- Average home league attendance: 16,812
Home colors	Away colors

The 2017 Philadelphia Union season was the club's eighth season in Major League Soccer, the top flight of American soccer. The team was managed by Jim Curtin, his fourth season with the club. The Union finished the 2017 season with the same points total as the 2016 season, but did not clinch entry to the MLS Cup Playoffs. The 2017 season also marks a new goalscoring record by C. J. Sapong who scored 16 goals in a single season, eclipsing Sebastian Le Toux's record of 14 goals during the inaugural season.

== Background ==
=== MLS SuperDraft ===
Round	Pick	Name	Position	Nationality	School
2	25	Marcus Epps	Forward	United States	South Florida
2	33	Aaron Jones	Defender	England	Clemson
3	55	Chris Nanco	Forward	Canada	Syracuse
4	77	Jack Elliott	Defender	England	West Virginia
4	82	Santi Moar	Forward	Spain	Pfeiffer

=== 2016 MLS regular season ===
During the 2016 MLS season the Union finished with an 11–14–9 record, which was enough for a playoff berth, the franchise's first since 2011, as the sixth seed. The Union also had a franchise record eight wins at home, finishing 8–5–4 at home and 3–9–5 on the road.

=== 2016 MLS Cup Playoffs ===
The Union faced Toronto FC in the Eastern Conference knockout round, where they lost 3–1 at BMO Field. The Union's only playoff goal of 2016 was scored by Alejandro Bedoya in the 73rd minute of that game.

=== 2016 Lamar Hunt U.S. open ===
The Union entered the fourth round of the U.S. Open Cup playing host to the Harrisburg City Islanders and won by a score of 3–2, advancing to play the New York Red Bulls in the round of 16, where a two-goal effort by Chris Pontius lifted the Union to a 2–1 victory. The Union went on to lose 4–2 in penalties to the New England Revolution after playing to a 1-1 draw through extra time in the quarterfinals.

== 2017 roster ==
Note: Flags indicate national team as defined under FIFA eligibility rules; some limited exceptions apply. Players may hold more than one non-FIFA nationality.

No.	Pos.	Nation	Player
2	MF	GUY	Warren Creavalle
3	DF	ENG	Jack Elliott
4	DF	USA	Ken Tribbett
5	DF	USA	Oguchi Onyewu
6	MF	BIH	Haris Medunjanin
7	MF	USA	Brian Carroll (Vice-captain)
8	MF	USA	Maurice Edu (DP)
9	FW	USA	Charlie Davies
10	MF	NED	Roland Alberg
11	MF	USA	Alejandro Bedoya (DP, Captain)
12	DF	USA	Keegan Rosenberry
13	MF	USA	Chris Pontius
14	MF	GER	Fabian Herbers (GA)
15	DF	GHA	Josh Yaro (GA)
16	DF	USA	Richie Marquez
17	FW	USA	C. J. Sapong

No.	Pos.	Nation	Player
18	GK	JAM	Andre Blake (GA)
19	MF	ENG	Aaron Jones
20	MF	USA	Marcus Epps
21	MF	USA	Derrick Jones (HGP)
22	MF	USA	Fafà Picault
23	GK	USA	John McCarthy
24	MF	AFG	Adam Najem (HGP)
25	MF	BRA	Ilsinho
26	DF	USA	Auston Trusty (HGP)
27	FW	ENG	Jay Simpson
28	DF	USA	Ray Gaddis
29	GK	USA	Jake McGuire
30	MF	CMR	Eric Ayuk Mbu
32	DF	NED	Giliano Wijnaldum
33	DF	BRA	Fabinho

=== Current squad ===
No.	Name	Nationality	Position	Date of birth (age)	Signed from
Goalkeepers
18	Andre Blake (INT)	(Jamaica)	GK	November 21, 1990 (age 35)	(United States) UConn
23	John McCarthy	(United States)	GK	July 4, 1992 (age 34)	(United States) Rochester Rhinos
29	Jake McGuire	(United States)	GK	September 3, 1994 (age 32)	(United States) University of Tulsa
Defenders
3	Jack Elliott	(Scotland)	CB	August 24, 1995 (age 31)	(United States) West Virginia University
4	Ken Tribbett	(United States)	CB	August 25, 1991 (age 35)	(United States) Bethlehem Steel FC
5	Oguchi Onyewu	(United States)	CB	May 13, 1982 (age 44)	Unattached
12	Keegan Rosenberry	(United States)	RB	December 11, 1993 (age 32)	(United States) Georgetown University
15	Joshua Yaro (INT, GA)	(Ghana)	LB/CB	March 7, 1994 (age 32)	(United States) Georgetown University
16	Richie Marquez	(United States)	CB	May 26, 1992 (age 34)	(United States) University of Redlands
19	Aaron Jones	(England)	CB	March 12, 1994 (age 32)	(United States) Clemson Tigers
26	Auston Trusty (HGP)	(United States)	CB	August 12, 1998 (age 28)	(United States) Bethlehem Steel FC
28	Ray Gaddis	(United States)	RB	January 13, 1990 (age 36)	(United States) West Virginia University
32	Giliano Wijnaldum (INT)	(Netherlands)	LB	August 31, 1992 (age 34)	(Germany) VfL Bochum
33	Fabinho	(Brazil)	LB	March 16, 1985 (age 41)	(Australia) Sydney FC
Midfielders
2	Warren Creavalle	(Guyana)	DM	August 14, 1990 (age 36)	(Canada) Toronto FC
6	Haris Medunjanin (INT)	(Bosnia and Herzegovina)	CM	March 8, 1985 (age 41)	(Israel) Maccabi Tel Aviv
7	Brian Carroll	(United States)	DM	July 20, 1981 (age 45)	(United States) Columbus Crew SC
8	Maurice Edu (DP)	(United States)	DM	April 18, 1986 (age 40)	(England) Stoke City
10	Roland Alberg (INT)	(Netherlands)	CM	August 6, 1990 (age 36)	(Netherlands) ADO Den Haag
11	Alejandro Bedoya (DP)	(United States)	CM/RM	April 29, 1987 (age 39)	(France) FC Nantes
13	Chris Pontius	(United States)	LM	May 12, 1987 (age 39)	(United States) D.C. United
20	Marcus Epps	(United States)	CF	January 16, 1995 (age 31)	(United States) South Florida
21	Derrick Jones (HGP)	(Ghana)	MF	March 3, 1997 (age 29)	(United States) Bethlehem Steel FC
22	Fafà Picault	(United States)	MF	February 23, 1991 (age 35)	(Germany) FC St. Pauli
24	Adam Najem (HGP)	(United States)	MF	January 19, 1995 (age 31)	(United States) Akron
25	Ilson Jr. (INT)	(Brazil)	CM/RM	October 12, 1985 (age 41)	(Ukraine) Shakhtar Donetsk
30	Eric Ayuk Mbu (INT)	(Cameroon)	LM/RM	February 17, 1997 (age 29)	(Cameroon) Rainbow FC Bamenda
Forwards
9	Charlie Davies	(United States)	CF	June 25, 1986 (age 40)	(United States) New England Revolution
14	Fabian Herbers (INT, GA)	(Germany)	CF	August 17, 1993 (age 33)	(United States) Creighton University
17	C.J. Sapong	(United States)	CF	December 27, 1988 (age 37)	(United States) Sporting Kansas City
27	Jay Simpson (INT)	(England)	CF	December 1, 1988 (age 37)	(England) Leyton Orient

Last updated: March 10, 2017.
Source: Philadelphia Union Roster

Last updated: March 10, 2017.
Source: MLS Designations

DP indicates Designated Player
GA indicates Generation Adidas Player
HGP indicates Home Grown Player
INT indicates MLS International Player and qualifies for an international roster spot

=== Current staff ===
As of March 2016

Position	Staff	Nation
Head coach	Jim Curtin	United States
Technical director/Assistant coach	Chris Albright	United States
Assistant coach	Mike Sorber	United States
Assistant coach	B.J. Callaghan	United States
Goalkeeping coach	Oka Nikolov	Macedonia
Head athletic trainer	Paul Rushing	United States
Strength and conditioning coach	Kevin Miller	United States
Sporting director	Earnie Stewart	United States
Academy director	Tommy Wilson	Scotland

== Competitions ==
=== Preseason ===
February 4, 2017 Closed-door Scrimmage	Philadelphia Union	1–1	D.C. United	St. Petersburg, Florida
	Sapong		Ortiz	Stadium: Al Lang Stadium

February 7, 2017 Closed-door Scrimmage	Philadelphia Union	5–3	United States U-17	Clearwater, Florida
AM	Picault; Bedoya; Tribbett; Nanco; Moar	Report	Goal	Stadium: Countryside Sportsplex

February 9, 2017 Closed-door Scrimmage	Philadelphia Union	0–1	Chicago Fire	Bradenton, Florida
2:00 PM	Alberg (yellow card) 39'	Report	Doody (yellow card) 49' de Leeuw 56'	Stadium: IMG Academy

February 15, 2017 Closed-door Scrimmage	Philadelphia Union	3–3	Orlando City SC	Clearwater, Florida
1:00 PM EST	Simpson; Ilson Jr. Sapong	Report	Johnson; Rivas; Larin	Stadium: Joe DiMaggio Sports Complex

February 18, 2017 Suncoast Invitational	Tampa Bay Rowdies	0–1	Philadelphia Union	St. Petersburg, Florida
7:30 p.m. EST	Mkandawire (yellow card) 55'; Collins (red card) 84'; Carr (yellow card) 88'	Report	Tribbett (yellow card) 61'; Jones (yellow card) 71', (goal) 73'	Stadium: Al Lang Stadium

February 22, 2017 Suncoast Invitational	Philadelphia Union	2–2	Montreal Impact	Clearwater, Florida
7:00 p.m. EST	Fabinho (yellow card) 28'; Ilson Jr. 34'; Sapong 82'	Report	DePuy 68'; Jackson-Hamel 90'	Stadium: Joe DiMaggio Sports Complex

February 25, 2017 Suncoast Invitational	D.C. United	3–2	Philadelphia Union	St. Petersburg, Florida
5:00 p.m. EST	Nyarko 14'; Jeffrey 21'; Mullins 24'; Acosta (yellow card) 34'; Sarvas (yellow card) 43'	Report	Marquez (yellow card) 9'; Fabinho (yellow card) 21'; Rosenberry (yellow card) 33'; Bedoya (yellow card) 41' (yellow-red card) 89'; Onyewu 51'; Sapong (yellow card) 46'; Epps 86'	Stadium: Al Lang Stadium

=== MLS season ===
March 5, 2017 1	Vancouver Whitecaps FC	0–0	Philadelphia Union	Vancouver, British Columbia
9:30 p.m. EST	Laba (yellow card) 55'	Box Score; Report	Herbers (yellow card) 80'	Stadium: B.C. Place; Attendance: 19,083; Referee: Sorin Stoica

March 11, 2017 2	Philadelphia Union	2–2	Toronto FC	Chester, Pennsylvania
4:30 p.m. EST	Simpson 11'; Fabinho (yellow card) 53'; Sapong 73'	Report; Box Score	Altidore 45+2' (pen.); Zavaleta (yellow card) 52'; Cooper (yellow card) 57'; Morrow 71'	Stadium: Talen Energy Stadium; Attendance: 16,795; Referee: Mark Geiger

March 18, 2017 3	Orlando City SC	2–1	Philadelphia Union	Orlando, Florida
7:30 p.m. EDT	Rivas (yellow card) 25'; Larin 39', 73'; Garcia (yellow card) 80'; Spector (yellow card) 82'	Report; Box Score	Onyewu (yellow card) 28'; Sapong 52'; Medunjanin (yellow card) 80'	Stadium: Orlando City Stadium; Attendance: 25,527; Referee: Fotis Pazakos

April 1, 2017 4	D.C. United	2–1	Philadelphia Union	Washington, D.C.
7:00 p.m. EDT	Ortiz 18'; Acosta 27' (pen.); Sarvas (yellow card) 66'	Report; Box Score	Ilsinho (yellow card) 57'; Jones (yellow card) 61'; Sapong 71'	Stadium: RFK Stadium; Attendance: 14,560; Referee: Ricardo Salazar

April 8, 2017 5	Philadelphia Union	1–3	Portland Timbers	Chester, Pennsylvania
7:00 p.m. EDT	Marquez 26'; Medunjanin (yellow card) 45+3'; Blake (yellow card) 85'; Onyewu (yellow card) 90+4'	Report; Box Score	Guzmán (yellow card) 16'; Nagbe 32'; Miller 66'; Olum (yellow card) 73'; Adi 88' (pen.) (yellow card) 89'	Stadium: Talen Energy Stadium; Attendance: 15,437; Referee: Robert Sibiga

April 14, 2017 6	Philadelphia Union	0–2	New York City FC	Chester, Pennsylvania
7:00 p.m. EDT	Elliott (yellow card) 25'	Report; Box Score	Ring (yellow card) 43'; Harrison 52'; Matarrita (yellow card) 55'; Villa 90'	Stadium: Talen Energy Stadium; Attendance: 16,553; Referee: Jose Carlos Rivero

April 22, 2017 7	Philadelphia Union	3–3	Montreal Impact	Chester, Pennsylvania
1:00 p.m. EDT	Alberg 5', 39' (pen.) (yellow card) 56'; Sapong 23'; Gaddis (yellow card) 43'; Bedoya (yellow card) 71'	Report; Box Score	Piatti 41' (yellow card) 65'; Jackson-Hamel 69', 87'	Stadium: Talen Energy Stadium; Attendance: 15,107; Referee: Nima Saghafi

April 29, 2017 8	LA Galaxy	0–0	Philadelphia Union	Los Angeles, California
10:30 p.m. EDT	Van Damme (yellow card) 44'; Diallo (yellow card) 90+3'	Report; Box Score		Stadium: StubHub Center; Attendance: 25,008; Referee: Alan Kelly

May 6, 2017 9	Philadelphia Union	3–0	New York Red Bulls	Chester, Pennsylvania
7:00 p.m. EDT	Picault (yellow card) 25'; Medunjanin (yellow card) 26'; Elliott (yellow card) 66'; Sapong 74', 81', 85' (pen.); Blake (yellow card) 87'	Report; Box Score	Long (yellow card) 9'	Stadium: Talen Energy Stadium; Attendance: 16,297; Referee: Silviu Petrescu

May 13, 2017 10	D.C. United	0–4	Philadelphia Union	Washington, D.C.
7:00 p.m. EDT	Neagle (yellow card) 19'; Acosta (red card) 55'; Sarvas (yellow card) 64'	Report; Box Score	Fabinho (yellow card) 4'; Bedoya (yellow card) 9'; Medunjanin 39'; Onyewu 64'; Picault 78'; Herbers 88'	Stadium: RFK Stadium; Attendance: 14,576; Referee: Chris Penso

May 17, 2017 11	Philadelphia Union	2–0	Houston Dynamo	Chester, Pennsylvania
7:30 p.m. EDT	Picault 17'; Ilson Jr. 38'; Gaddis (yellow card) 47'; Rosenberry (yellow card) 85'	Report; Box Score	Leonardo (yellow card) 39'; Quioto (yellow card) 39'; Cabezas (yellow card) 48'	Stadium: Talen Energy Stadium; Attendance: 15,234; Referee: Jorge Gonzalez

May 20, 2017 12	Philadelphia Union	2–1	Colorado Rapids	Chester, Pennsylvania
7:00 p.m. EDT	Bedoya (yellow card) 63'; Sapong 67' (pen.); Medunjanin 75'; Wijnaldum (yellow card) 81'	Report; Box Score	Saeid (yellow card) 44'; Calvert (yellow card) 69' (red card) 69'; Gatt (yellow card) 74'	Stadium: Talen Energy Stadium; Attendance: 18,399; Referee: Jose Carlos Rivero

May 27, 2017 13	Real Salt Lake	1–0	Philadelphia Union	Sandy, Utah
5:00 p.m. EDT	Silva (yellow card) 28'; Plata 36'; Wingert (yellow card) 51'	Report; Box Score	Onyewu (yellow card) 70'; Bedoya (yellow card) 77'	Stadium: Rio Tinto Stadium; Attendance: 18,305; Referee: Fotis Bazakos

June 3, 2017 14	New York City FC	2–1	Philadelphia Union	New York, New York
1:00 p.m. EDT	Camargo (yellow card) 30'; Moralez (yellow card) 78'; Chanot 80'; Callens 85'	Report; Box Score	Sapong (yellow card) 64'; Picault 69'; Alberg (yellow card) 83'	Stadium: Yankee Stadium; Referee: Hilari Grajeda

June 18, 2017 15	Philadelphia Union	0–2	New York Red Bulls	Chester, Pennsylvania
5:00 p.m. EDT	Jones (red card) 53'; Creavalle (yellow card) 67'	Report; Box Score	Perrinelle (yellow card) 71'; Collin (yellow card) 84'; Wright-Philips 87', 90+2'	Stadium: Talen Energy Stadium; Attendance: 17,720; Referee: Radu Petrescu

June 24, 2017 16	Philadelphia Union	1–0	D.C. United	Chester, Pennsylvania
7:00 p.m. EDT	Picault 31'	Report; Box Score	Ortiz (yellow card) 31'	Stadium: Talen Energy Stadium; Attendance: 17,656; Referee: Sorin Stoica

July 2, 2017 17	Philadelphia Union	3–0	New England Revolution	Chester, Pennsylvania
5:00 p.m. EDT	Sapong 4' (pen.); Ilsinho 48'; Alberg 78'	Report; Box Score	Watson (yellow card) 45+3'; Angoua (yellow card) 68'	Stadium: Talen Energy Stadium; Attendance: 16,143; Referee: Chris Penso

July 6, 2017 18	Sporting Kansas City	1–1	Philadelphia Union	Kansas City, Kansas
8:30 p.m. EDT	Rubio 49'; Abdul-Salaam (yellow card) 64'; Feilhaber (yellow card) 68'	Report; Box Score	Medunjanin (yellow card) 68'; Alberg 69' (pen.)	Stadium: Children's Mercy Park; Attendance: 19,240; Referee: Ricardo Salazar

July 19, 2017 19	Montreal Impact	2–1	Philadelphia Union	Montreal, Quebec
7:30 p.m. EDT	Salazar 19'; Béland-Goyette (yellow card) 32'; Džemaili 51'; Bernardello (yellow card) 90+4'	Report; Box Score	Alberg (yellow card) 29'; Picault 43'; Gaddis (yellow card) 45'; Elliott (yellow card) 77'; Onyewu (yellow card) 90+3'	Stadium: Saputo Stadium; Attendance: 16,660; Referee: Alan Kelly

July 22, 2017 20	Columbus Crew SC	1–0	Philadelphia Union	Columbus, Ohio
7:30 p.m. EDT	Meram 65'	Report; Box Score	Elliott (yellow card) 68'	Stadium: Mapfre Stadium; Attendance: 17,418; Referee: Silviu Petrescu

July 26, 2017 21	Philadelphia Union	3–0	Columbus Crew SC	Chester, Pennsylvania
7:30 p.m. EDT	Ilsinho 20'; Wijnaldum (yellow card) 31'; Gaddis (yellow card) 39'; Sapong 66'; Epps 81'	Report; Box Score	Mensah (red card) 35'; Abubakar (yellow card) 35' (red card) 76'	Stadium: Talen Energy Stadium; Attendance: 15,413; Referee: Ismail Elfath

July 29, 2017 22	New England Revolution	3–0	Philadelphia Union	Foxborough, Massachusetts
7:30 p.m. EDT	Koffie (yellow card) 34'; Kamara 38', 85'; Agudelo 89'	Report; Box Score	Onyewu (yellow card) 29'; Wijnaldum (yellow card) 76'	Stadium: Gillette Stadium; Attendance: 18,584; Referee: Nima Saghafi

August 5, 2017 23	Philadelphia Union	3–1	FC Dallas	Chester, Pennsylvania
7:00 p.m. EDT	Sapong 17', 68'; Ilsinho 22', (yellow card) 64'	Report; Box Score	Cermeño (yellow card) 45+1'; Hedges (yellow card) 55'; Barrios 90+2'	Stadium: Talen Energy Stadium; Attendance: 17,880; Referee: Ricardo Salazar

August 12, 2017 24	Philadelphia Union	0–3	Montreal Impact	Chester, Pennsylvania
8:00 p.m. EDT		Report; Box Score	Duvall (yellow card) 47'; Dzemaili 69', 90+5'; Piette (yellow card) 84'; Piatti 90+1' (pen.)	Stadium: Talen Energy Stadium; Attendance: 15,297; Referee: Rubiel Vazquez

August 19, 2017 25	San Jose Earthquakes	2–2	Philadelphia Union	San Jose, California
10:30 p.m. EDT	Qazaishvili 3'; Jungwirth (yellow card) 13'; Godoy (yellow card) 34'; Thompson (yellow card) 73'; Wondolowski (yellow card) 83', (goal) 90+5' (pen.)	Report; Box Score	Elliott 35'; Alberg 55'; Bedoya (yellow card) 74'; Gaddis (yellow card) 90+1'	Stadium: Avaya Stadium; Attendance: 18,000; Referee: Ted Unkel

August 23, 2017 26	Toronto FC	3–0	Philadelphia Union	Toronto, Ontario
8:00 p.m. EDT	Giovinco 10'; Hasler 30', (yellow card) 67'; Altidore 57'	Report; Box Score	Fabinho (yellow card) 28'	Stadium: BMO Field; Attendance: 28,645; Referee: Armando Villarreal

August 26, 2017 27	Philadelphia Union	2–2	Atlanta United FC	Chester, Pennsylvania
7:00 p.m. EDT	Bedoya (yellow card) 10', (goal) 23'; Alberg 18'; Sapong (yellow card) 29'; Yaro (red card) 52'	Report; Box Score	Martínez (yellow card) 13'; Asad 26'; Mears 90+1'	Stadium: Talen Energy Stadium; Attendance: 17,221; Referee: Drew Fischer

September 9, 2017 28	Minnesota United FC	1–1	Philadelphia Union	Minneapolis, Minnesota
8:00 p.m. EDT	Finlay 40'	Report; Box Score	Sapong 5'; Wijnaldum (yellow card) 38'; Onyewu (yellow card) 55'; Ilsinho (yellow card) 60'	Stadium: TCF Bank Stadium; Attendance: 22,148; Referee: Sorin Stoica

September 17, 2017 29	New York Red Bulls	0–0	Philadelphia Union	Harrison, New Jersey
1:00 p.m. EDT	Murillo (yellow card) 35'; Verón (yellow card) 69'	Report; Box Score	Fabinho (yellow card) 70'	Stadium: Red Bull Arena; Attendance: 20,534; Referee: Jose Carlos Rivero

September 23, 2017 30	Philadelphia Union	3–1	Chicago Fire	Chester, Pennsylvania
7:00 p.m. EDT	Pontius 10', 55'; Sapong 64'; Rosenberry (yellow card) 85'; Creavalle (yellow card) 86'	Report; Box Score	Polster (yellow card) 16'; Kappelhof (yellow card) 42'; Solignac 67'	Stadium: Talen Energy Stadium; Attendance: 18,619; Referee: Robert Sibiga

September 27, 2017 31	Atlanta United FC	3–0	Philadelphia Union	Atlanta, Georgia
7:00 p.m. EDT	Gressel 27'; Martínez 33', (yellow card) 67'; Peterson 88'	Report; Box Score		Stadium: Bobby Dodd Stadium; Attendance: 43,006; Referee: Mark Geiger

October 1, 2017 32	Philadelphia Union	2–0	Seattle Sounders FC	Chester, Pennsylvania
1:00 p.m. EDT	Ilsinho (yellow card) 27'; Epps 28'; Alberg 88'	Report; Box Score	Delem (yellow card) 11'	Stadium: Talen Energy Stadium; Attendance: 17,431; Referee: Alan Kelly

October 15, 2017 33	Chicago Fire	3–2	Philadelphia Union	Bridgeview, Illinois
5:00 p.m. EDT	Nikolić 3', 64' (pen.), 78'; Polster (yellow card) 45+1'	Report; Box Score	Kappelhof 6' (o.g.); Bedoya 13'	Stadium: Toyota Park; Attendance: 17,616; Referee: Allen Chapman

October 22, 2017 34	Philadelphia Union	6–1	Orlando City SC	Chester, Pennsylvania
4:00 p.m. EDT	Ilsinho 3', 63'; Picault 6', 38'; Sapong 26', 74', (yellow card) 65'	Report; Box Score	Dwyer 72'	Stadium: Talen Energy Stadium; Attendance: 18,595; Referee: Joseph Dickerson

=== U.S. Open Cup ===
June 14, 2017 Fourth round	Philadelphia Union	3–1	Harrisburg City Islanders	Chester, Pennsylvania
7:30 p.m. EDT	Jones 18'; Sapong 33'; Epps 47'	Report; Box Score	Mendoza 37'; Ribeiro (yellow card) 41'; Mohamed (yellow card) 67'; Bond (yellow card) 85'	Stadium: Talen Energy Stadium; Attendance: 3,866

June 28, 2017 Round of 16	New York Red Bulls	1–1 (a.e.t.) (5–3 p)	Philadelphia Union	Harrison, New Jersey
8:00 p.m. EDT	Felipe (yellow card) 37'; Kljestan 42'; Perrinelle (yellow card) 90+4'	Report; Box Score	Alberg 86'; Pontius (yellow card) 113'; McCarthy (yellow card) Shootout	Stadium: Red Bull Arena; Attendance: 9,136; Referee: Alex Chilowicz
	Penalties
	Zizzo (penalty scored); Verón (penalty scored); Royer (penalty scored); Kljestan (penalty scored); Felipe (penalty scored)		(penalty scored) Alberg; (penalty scored) Pontius; (penalty missed) Picault; (penalty scored) Epps

=== Friendlies ===
July 15, 2017 International Friendly	Philadelphia Union	2–2	Swansea City	Chester, Pennsylvania
7:00 p.m. EDT	Sapong 6' (pen.); Simpson 57'		Bartley 28'; Ayew 40'	Stadium: Talen Energy Stadium; Attendance: 16,250; Referee: Jorge Gonzalez

== Standings ==
=== Eastern Conference standings ===
Pos	Team	Pld	W	L	T	GF	GA	GD	Pts	Qualification
1	Toronto FC	34	20	5	9	74	37	+37	69	Qualification for the conference semifinals
2	New York City FC	34	16	9	9	56	43	+13	57	Qualification for the conference semifinals
3	Chicago Fire	34	16	11	7	62	48	+14	55	Qualification for the knockout round
4	Atlanta United FC	34	15	9	10	70	40	+30	55	Qualification for the knockout round
5	Columbus Crew	34	16	12	6	53	49	+4	54	Qualification for the knockout round
6	New York Red Bulls	34	14	12	8	53	47	+6	50	Qualification for the knockout round
7	New England Revolution	34	13	15	6	53	61	−8	45	
8	Philadelphia Union	34	11	14	9	50	47	+3	42	
9	Montreal Impact	34	11	17	6	52	58	−6	39	
10	Orlando City SC	34	10	15	9	39	58	−19	39	
11	D.C. United	34	9	20	5	31	60	−29	32	

Source: MLS

=== League standings ===
Pos	Team	Pld	W	L	T	GF	GA	GD	Pts	Qualification
1	Toronto FC (C, S, V)	34	20	5	9	74	37	+37	69	Qualification for the CONCACAF Champions League
2	New York City FC	34	16	9	9	56	43	+13	57	
3	Chicago Fire	34	16	11	7	61	47	+14	55	
4	Atlanta United FC	34	15	9	10	70	40	+30	55	
5	Columbus Crew	34	16	12	6	53	49	+4	54	
6	Portland Timbers	34	15	11	8	60	50	+10	53	
7	Seattle Sounders FC	34	14	9	11	52	39	+13	53	
8	Vancouver Whitecaps FC	34	15	12	7	50	49	+1	52	
9	New York Red Bulls	34	14	12	8	53	47	+6	50	
10	Houston Dynamo	34	13	10	11	57	45	+12	50	
11	Sporting Kansas City (U)	34	12	9	13	40	29	+11	49	Qualification for the CONCACAF Champions League
12	San Jose Earthquakes	34	13	14	7	39	60	−21	46	
13	FC Dallas	34	11	10	13	48	48	0	46	
14	Real Salt Lake	34	13	15	6	49	55	−6	45	
15	New England Revolution	34	13	15	6	53	61	−8	45	
16	Philadelphia Union	34	11	14	9	50	47	+3	42	
17	Montreal Impact	34	11	17	6	52	58	−6	39	
18	Orlando City SC	34	10	15	9	39	58	−19	39	
19	Minnesota United FC	34	10	18	6	47	70	−23	36	
20	Colorado Rapids	34	9	19	6	31	51	−20	33	
21	D.C. United	34	9	20	5	31	60	−29	32	
22	LA Galaxy	34	8	18	8	45	67	−22	32	

Source: MLS
Rules for classification: 1) points; 2) total wins; 3) total goal differential; 4) total goals scored; 5) disciplinary points; 6) away goals scored; 7) away goal differential; 8) coin toss or drawing of lots
(C) MLS Cup champions; (S) Supporters' Shield winners; (U) U.S. Open Cup winners; (V) Canadian Championship winners

== Statistics ==
=== Appearances and goals ===
As of February 28, 2018

No.	Pos	Nat	Player	Total		MLS		MLS Cup		U.S. Open Cup	
No.	Pos	Nat	Player	Apps	Goals	Apps	Goals	Apps	Goals	Apps	Goals
Defenders
3	DF	(England) ENG	Jack Elliott	30	2	29+1	0	0	2	0	0
4	DF	(United States) USA	Ken Tribbett	1	0	0+1	0	0	0	0	0
5	DF	(United States) USA	Oguchi Onyewu	22	1	22	1	0	0	0	0
12	DF	(United States) USA	Keegan Rosenberry	16	0	11+3	0	0	0	2	0
15	DF	(Ghana) GHA	Joshua Yaro	8	0	4+2	0	0	0	2	0
16	DF	(United States) USA	Richie Marquez	15	1	13+2	1	0	0	0	0
19	DF	(England) ENG	Aaron Jones	0	0	0	0	0	0	0	0
26	DF	(United States) USA	Auston Trusty	0	0	0	0	0	0	0	0
28	DF	(United States) USA	Ray Gaddis	27	0	23+3	0	0	0	0+1	0
32	DF	(Netherlands) NED	Giliano Wijnaldum	14	0	13	0	0	0	1	0
33	DF	(Brazil) BRA	Fabinho	23	0	21+1	0	0	0	1	0
Midfielders
2	MF	(Guyana) GUY	Warren Creavalle	13	0	5+8	0	0	0	0	0
4	MF	(Bosnia and Herzegovina) BIH	Haris Medunjanin	36	2	34	2	0	0	2	0
7	MF	(United States) USA	Brian Carroll	1	0	0+1	0	0	0	0	0
8	MF	(United States) USA	Maurice Edu	0	0	0	0	0	0	0	0
10	MF	(Netherlands) NED	Roland Alberg	26	8	9+15	7	0	0	2	1
11	MF	(United States) USA	Alejandro Bedoya	28	2	28	2	0	0	0	0
13	MF	(United States) USA	Chris Pontius	31	2	27+3	2	0	0	0+1	0
20	MF	(United States) USA	Marcus Epps	21	3	7+12	2	0	0	1+1	1
21	MF	(United States) USA	Derrick Jones	14	1	8+4	0	0	0	2	1
22	MF	(United States) USA	Fafa Picault	29	7	23+5	7	0	0	1	0
24	MF	(United States) USA	Adam Najem	5	0	1+4	0	0	0	0	0
25	MF	(United States) USA	Ilson Jr.	27	6	24+3	6	0	0	0	0
30	MF	(Cameroon) CMR	Eric Ayuk Mbu	0	0	0	0	0	0	0	0
Forwards
9	FW	(United States) USA	Charlie Davies	1	0	0	0	0	0	0+1	0
17	FW	(United States) USA	C.J. Sapong	35	17	30+3	16	0	0	2	1
27	FW	(England) ENG	Jay Simpson	24	1	4+18	1	0	0	2	0

Statistics are from all matches as documented by Soccerway.com.

=== Top scorers ===
As of March 3, 2018

Place	Position	Name	MLS	MLS Cup	Open Cup	Total
1	FW	(United States) C. J. Sapong	16	0	1	17
2	MF	(Netherlands) Roland Alberg	7	0	1	8
3	MF	(United States) Fafà Picault	7	0	0	7
4	MF	(Brazil) Ilsinho	6	0	0	6
5	MF	(United States) Marcus Epps	2	0	1	3
8	MF	(Bosnia and Herzegovina) Haris Medunjanin	2	0	0	2
8	MF	(United States) Alejandro Bedoya	2	0	0	2
8	MF	(United States) Chris Pontius	2	0	0	2
14	DF	(England) Jack Elliott	1	0	0	1
14	DF	(United States) Oguchi Onyewu	1	0	0	1
14	MF	(Germany) Fabian Herbers	1	0	0	1
14	DF	(United States) Richie Marquez	1	0	0	1
14	MF	(United States) Derrick Jones	0	0	1	1
14	FW	(England) Jay Simpson	1	0	0	1
Total			49	0	4	53

=== Goalkeepers ===
As of March 3, 2018

Nat.	No.	Player	Apps	Starts	Record	GA	GAA	SO	Yellow card	Red card
(Jamaica)	1	Andre Blake	26	26	9–10–7	34	1.31	9	2	0
(United States)	27	John McCarthy	8	8	2–4–2	13	1.63	1	0	0
(United States)	29	Jake McGuire	0	0	0–0–0	0	0.00	0	0	0
Total					11–14–9	47	1.38	10	2	0

Record = W-L-D

== Transfers ==
=== In ===
Date	No.	Pos.	Player	Transferred from	Fee/notes	Source
January 5, 2017	32	LB	(Netherlands) Giliano Wijnaldum	(Germany) VfL Bochum	Discovery Signing	
January 9, 2017	27	FW	(England) Jay Simpson	(England) Leyton Orient	Discovery Signing using TAM	
January 30, 2017	5	CB	(United States) Oguchi Onyewu	Unattached	Discovery Signing	
January 31, 2017	6	CM	(Bosnia and Herzegovina) Haris Medunjanin	(Israel) Maccabi Tel Aviv	Signing using TAM	
February 2, 2017	22	MF	(United States) Fafà Picault	(Germany) FC St. Pauli	Discover Signing	
February 6, 2017	20	FW	(United States) Marcus Epps	(United States) South Florida	2017 Philadelphia Union Draft Signing	
February 8, 2017	24	MF	(United States) Adam Najem	(United States) University of Akron	Traded first right to refusal with New York Red Bulls	
February 23, 2017	19	DF	(England) Aaron Jones	(United States) Clemson Tigers	2017 Philadelphia Union Draft Signing	
February 24, 2017	3	DF	(England) Jack Elliott	(United States) West Virginia University	2017 Philadelphia Union Draft Signing	
March 10, 2017	29	GK	(United States) Jake McGuire	(United States) University of Tulsa	Waiver Selection	

=== Out ===
Date	No.	Pos.	Player	Transferred to	Fee/notes	Source
October 28, 2016	10	MF	(Switzerland) Tranquillo Barnetta	(Switzerland) FC St. Gallen	End of Contract	
November 2, 2016	3	DF	(United States) Taylor Washington	(United States) Pittsburgh Riverhounds	Contract Option Declined	
November 2, 2016	19	MF	(United States) Cole Missimo		Contract Option Declined	
November 2, 2016	20	MF	(Colombia) Wálter Restrepo	(United States) New York Cosmos	Contract Option Declined	
November 2, 2016	23	DF	(Brazil) Anderson Conceição	(Brazil) Tombense	End of Loan	
November 2, 2016	27	GK	(England) Matt Jones	(Portugal) Belenenses	End of Loan	
November 2, 2016	32	MF	(Germany) Kevin Kratz	(United States) Atlanta United FC	Trade for 2020 4th Round MLS SuperDraft Pick	
January 18, 2017	22	MF	(Brazil) Leo Fernandes	(United States) Tampa Bay Rowdies	End of Contract	

=== Loan in ===
Date	No.	Pos.	Player	Loaned from	Notes

=== Loan out ===
Date	No.	Pos.	Player	Loaned to	Notes
April 4, 2017	30	MF	(Cameroon) Eric Ayuk	(Sweden) Jönköpings Södra IF	Remainder of 2017 season

== Honors and awards ==
=== MLS Player of the Week ===
Week	Player	Stats
9	(United States) Chris Pontius	3G

=== MLS Save of the Week ===
Week	Player	Link
21	(United States) John McCarthy	
