= C. J. Sapong =

American soccer player

CJ Sapong
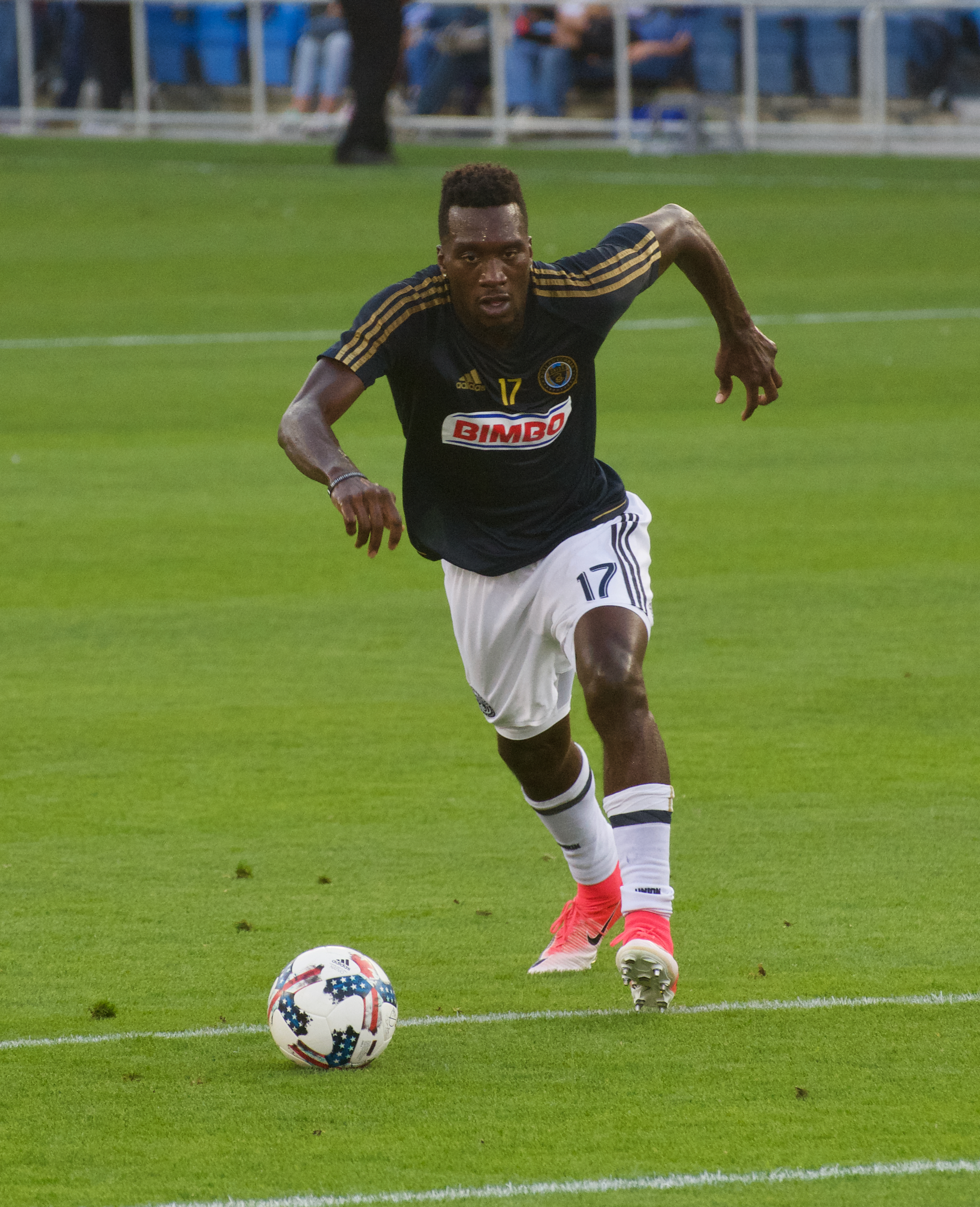
- Sapong with the Philadelphia Union in 2017

Personal information
- Full name: Charles Nana Kwabena Sapong
- Date of birth: December 27, 1988 (age 37)
- Place of birth: Manassas, Virginia, U.S.
- Height: 6 ft 1 in (1.85 m)
- Position: Forward

Youth career
- D.C. United

College career
Years	Team	Apps	(Gls)
2007–2010	James Madison Dukes	67	(35)

Senior career*
Years	Team	Apps	(Gls)
2009	Fredericksburg Gunners	8	(0)
2010	Reading United	11	(4)
2011–2014	Sporting Kansas City	110	(20)
2013	→ Orlando City (loan)	4	(1)
2015–2018	Philadelphia Union	123	(36)
2019–2020	Chicago Fire	43	(15)
2021–2023	Nashville SC	74	(17)
2023	Toronto FC	20	(1)
Total		393	(84)

International career^{‡}
2012–2018	United States	4	(0)
- * Club domestic league appearances and goals as of November 2, 2023 ‡ National team caps and goals as of March 30, 2019

Charles "CJ" Nana Kwabena Sapong (/səˈpɒŋ/; born December 27, 1988) is an American former professional soccer player who played as a forward.

Born in Manassas, Virginia, Sapong was part of the D.C. United youth academy before playing college soccer for the James Madison Dukes. After playing four seasons with James Madison, Sapong was drafted in the first round of the 2011 MLS SuperDraft by Sporting Kansas City as the 11th overall pick.

After his debut professional season, Sapong was named the MLS Rookie of the Year for 2011. In 2012, Sapong won his first championship, helping Kansas City win the U.S. Open Cup. He then was part of the side that won MLS Cup in 2013. Prior to the 2015 season, Sapong was traded to the Philadelphia Union. He played for the Union for three seasons, converting from a winger to a forward, before being traded to the Chicago Fire in 2019. Sapong has also represented the United States internationally, earning four caps between 2012 and 2018.

== Playing career ==
=== College ===
Sapong played college soccer at James Madison University, where he ended his career with 37 goals and 21 assists in four seasons from 2007 to 2010. He was awarded First Team All-Conference and team Offensive MVP honors all four years, a first in program history, and was the CAA Player of the Year as a senior co-captain in 2010. Sapong was a two-time NSCAA First Team All-South Atlantic Region selection. As a freshman, he was named the CAA and VaSID Rookie of the Year and chosen to the Third Team All-South Atlantic Region.

Sapong made eight appearances for Fredericksburg Gunners in the USL Premier Development League in 2009, and made eleven appearances and scored four goals for Reading United during their 2010 PDL season.

=== Club ===
==== Sporting Kansas City ====
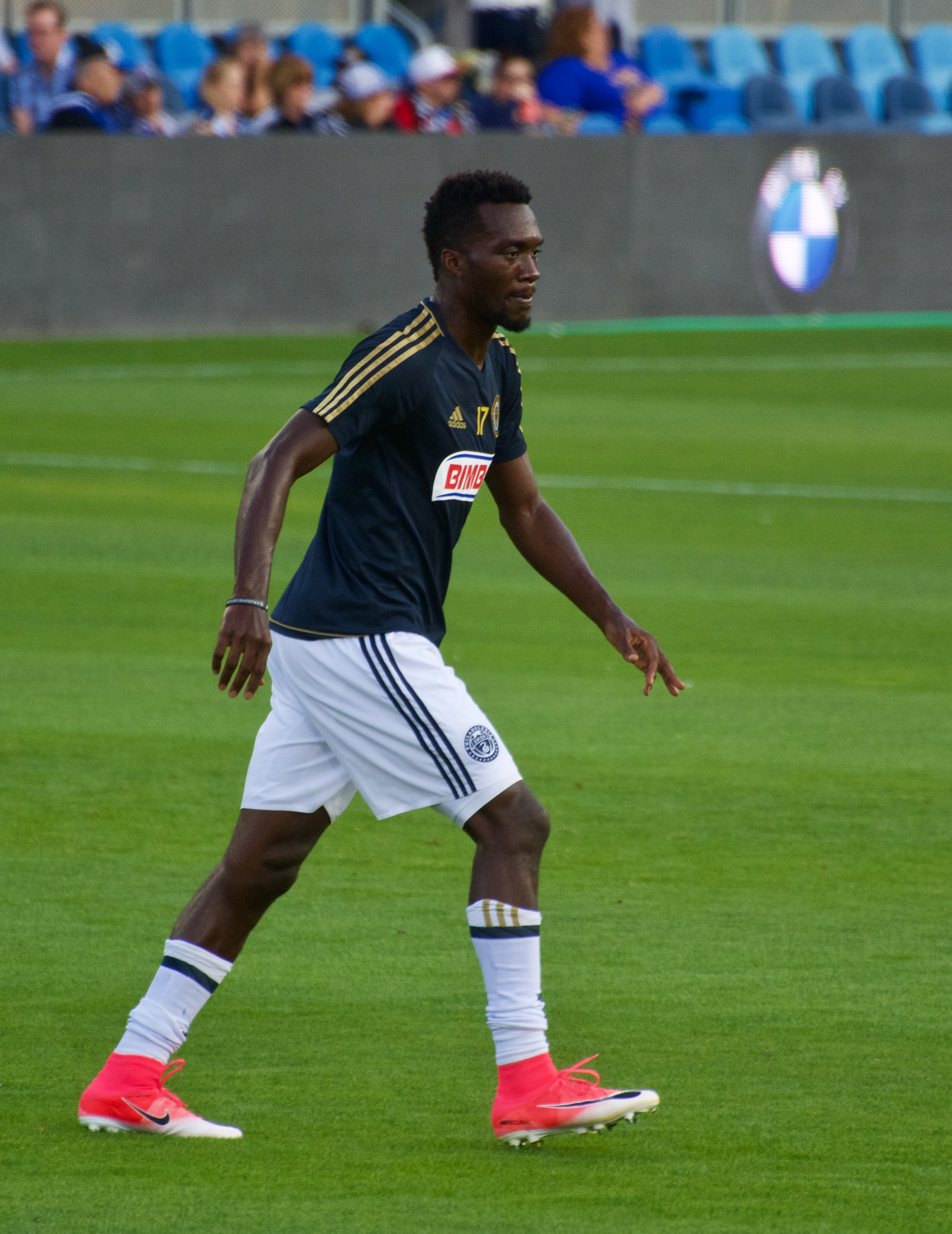

On January 14, 2011, Sapong was drafted #10 overall in the 2011 MLS SuperDraft by Sporting Kansas City. He signed with the club on March 1, 2011. He made his professional debut on March 19, in Kansas City's opening game of the 2011 MLS season against Chivas USA; he scored his first professional goal after just two minutes of the game, helping his team to a 3–2 victory. Sapong was awarded the MLS Rookie of the Year Award for 2011, edging out Perry Kitchen and Michael Farfan, who finished second and third, respectively.

==== Orlando City ====
Sapong was loaned to USL Pro's Orlando City in July 2013. On July 18, only a week after being loaned to Orlando, Sapong was recalled by Sporting Kansas City. In total, Sapong scored one goal in three matches while tallying one assist.

==== Philadelphia Union ====
On December 8, 2014, Sapong was traded by Kansas City to Philadelphia Union in exchange for a first-round pick in the 2015 MLS SuperDraft. After several seasons of being deployed on the wing with Kansas City, Sapong was positioned as the Union's lone center forward, taking advantage of his strength and hold-up play. He led the Union in goals during the 2015 season (with 9) and would build on those totals in subsequent seasons. He scored his first career hat-trick in Philadelphia's 3–0 victory over the New York Red Bulls at Talen Energy Stadium on May 6, 2017.

On October 22, 2017, Sapong broke the Union's (and his own) single-season scoring record, previously held by Sebastian Le Toux (14 goals during the 2010 season). At home against Orlando City, on the final day of the season, Sapong scored his fifteenth and sixteenth goals for the record.

==== Chicago Fire ====
On February 23, 2019, Sapong was traded by Philadelphia to Chicago Fire in exchange for up to $450,000 in Allocation Money.

The specifics of the Allocation Money are as follows: $200,000 in 2019 General Allocation Money, $100,000 in 2020 Targeted Allocation Money, and an additional $100,000 in 2019 General Allocation Money to be conveyed to Philadelphia should the Chicago Fire acquire said funds this year.

If the Fire do not acquire an additional $100,000 in 2019 General Allocation Money to convey to Philadelphia this season, then that money conveys as GAM in 2020, and the Union also receive $50,000 in 2020 Targeted Allocation Money from Chicago should Sapong hit certain performance incentives in 2019.

Sapong's contract with the club expired at the end of the 2020 season.

==== Nashville SC ====
On February 10, 2021, Sapong signed as a free agent with Nashville SC.

==== Toronto FC ====
On April 25, 2023, Sapong was traded to Toronto FC for Lukas MacNaughton and up to $200,000 of general allocation money. At the end of the 2023 season, the club declined his option for the 2024 season. On May 6, 2025, Sapong announced his retirement from professional soccer.

=== International ===
On January 21, 2012, Sapong made his debut for the senior side of the United States (as a second-half substitute) in the 1–0 win over Venezuela in a friendly match. On November 14, 2017, Sapong made his first start for the United States in a friendly against Portugal, notching an assist with an incisive pass to Weston McKennie.

== Personal life ==
Born in the United States, Sapong is of Ghanaian descent. On February 23, 2017, Sapong helped launch the Sacred Seeds foundation, which promotes and enhances the growth of underserved communities through sustenance and self-sustainability. He was inspired by his own experiences recovering from injuries during his soccer career and being reluctant to rely on painkillers rather than more nutritional methods.

On May 1, 2015, Sapong was arrested for DUI and reckless driving. He was found not guilty of the DUI charge but still faced the reckless driving charge and was still forced to have attended an MLS league-mandated stint at a treatment facility in Malibu, California. Sapong has credited the experience with having "changed [his] life."

== Career statistics ==
=== Club ===
As of match played September 24, 2023

Appearances and goals by club, season and competition
Club	Season	League			Playoffs		National cup		Continental (Note: Includes CONCACAF Champions League)		Other (Note: Includes Leagues Cup)		Total	
Club	Season	Division	Apps	Goals	Apps	Goals	Apps	Goals	Apps	Goals	Apps	Goals	Apps	Goals
Sporting Kansas City	2011	Major League Soccer	34	5	3	1	1	0	–		—		38	6
Sporting Kansas City	2012	Major League Soccer	31	9	2	0	5	2	–		—		38	11
Sporting Kansas City	2013	Major League Soccer	25	4	5	1	2	0	5	0	—		37	5
Sporting Kansas City	2014	Major League Soccer	20	2	1	0	2	0	4	0	—		27	2
Sporting Kansas City	Total		110	20	11	2	10	2	9	0	0	0	140	24
Orlando City (loan)	2013	USL Pro	4	1	–		0	0	–		—		4	1
Philadelphia Union	2015	Major League Soccer	27	9	–		4	0	–		—		31	9
Philadelphia Union	2016	Major League Soccer	31	7	1	0	1	0	–		—		33	7
Philadelphia Union	2017	Major League Soccer	33	16	–		2	1	–		—		35	17
Philadelphia Union	2018	Major League Soccer	32	4	1	0	3	1	–		—		36	5
Philadelphia Union	Total		123	36	2	0	10	2	–		–		135	38
Chicago Fire	2019	Major League Soccer	32	13	–		1	0	1	0	—		34	13
Chicago Fire	2020	Major League Soccer	11 (Note: Includes three appearances in MLS is Back Tournament group stage)	2	–		–		–		—		11	2
Chicago Fire	Total		43	15	–		1	0	1	0	0	0	45	15
Nashville SC	2021	Major League Soccer	33	12	2	0	–		–		—		35	12
Nashville SC	2022	Major League Soccer	33	5	1	0	3	1	–		—		37	6
Nashville SC	2023	Major League Soccer	8	0	0	0	0	0	–		–		8	0
Nashville SC	Total		74	17	3	0	3	1	0	0	0	0	80	18
Toronto FC	2023	Major League Soccer	20	1	–		1	0	–		1	0	22	1
Career total			370	90	16	2	25	5	10	0	1	0	377	97

=== International ===
As of match played January 28, 2018

Appearances and goals by national team and year
National team	Year	Apps	Goals
United States	2012	2	0
United States	2017	1	0
United States	2018	1	0
Total		4	0

== Honors ==
Sporting Kansas City

- MLS Cup: 2013
- U.S. Open Cup: 2012

Individual

- MLS Rookie of the Year: 2011
