= Andre Blake =

Jamaican footballer (born 1990)

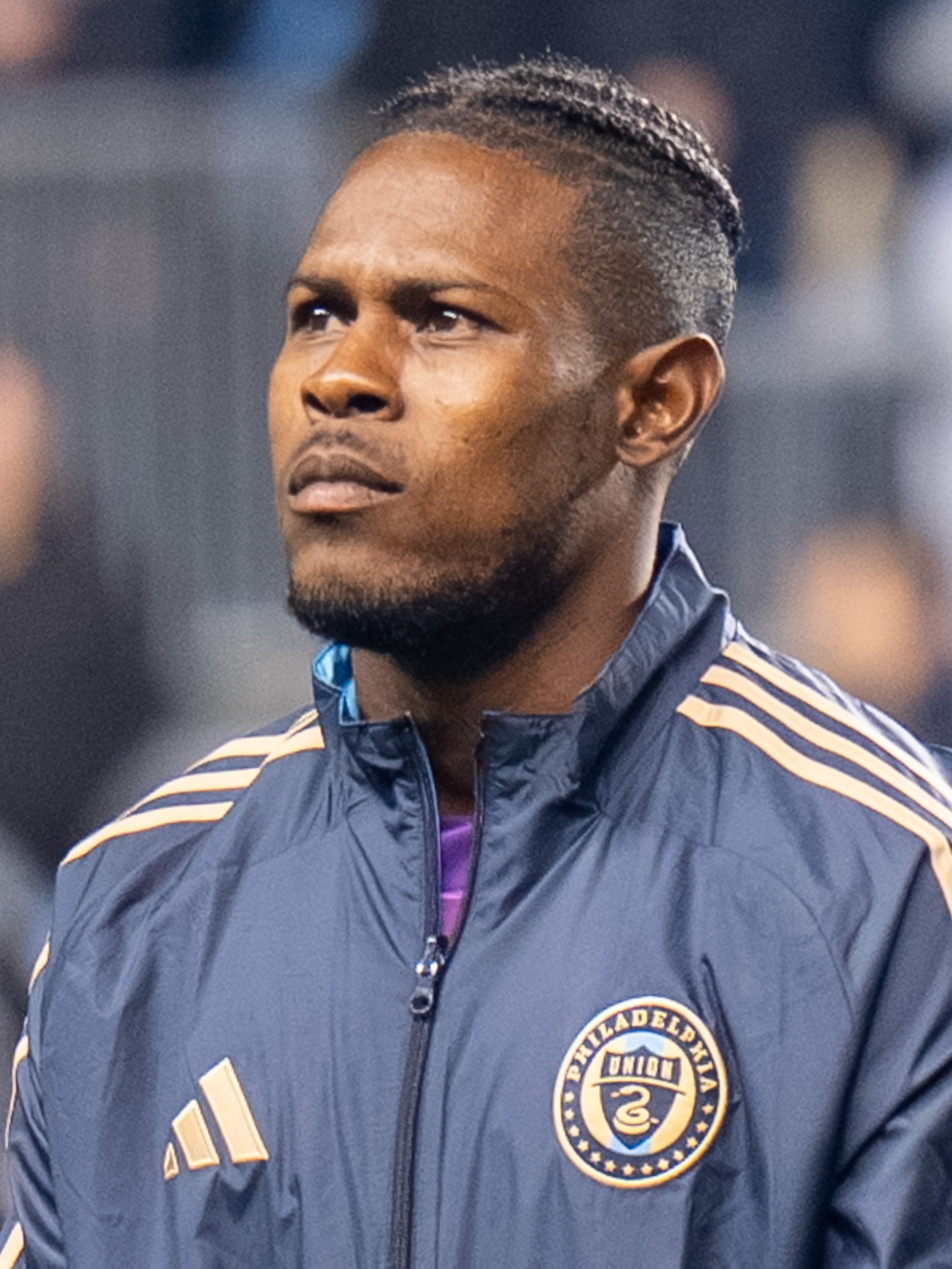
- Blake with the Philadelphia Union in 2025

Personal information
- Full name: Andre Jason Blake
- Date of birth: 21 November 1990 (age 36)
- Place of birth: May Pen, Jamaica
- Height: 6 ft 2 in (1.88 m)
- Position: Goalkeeper

Team information
- Current team: Philadelphia Union
- Number: 18

Youth career
- Sporting Central Academy
- Harbour View

College career
| Years | Team | Apps | (Gls) |
| 2011–2013 | Connecticut Huskies | 68 | (0) |

Senior career*
| Years | Team | Apps | (Gls) |
| 2014– | Philadelphia Union | 299 | (0) |

International career^{‡}
- Jamaica U17
- Jamaica U20
- Jamaica U23
| 2014– | Jamaica | 98 | (0) |
Medal record
Men's football
Representing Jamaica
CONCACAF Gold Cup
| Runner-up | 2015 United States–Canada | Team |
| Runner-up | 2017 United States | Team |
CONCACAF Nations League
| Third place | 2024 United States | Team |
Caribbean Cup
| Winner | 2014 Jamaica | Team |
- * Club domestic league appearances and goals as of 7 November 2026 ‡ National team caps and goals as of 22:00, 5 October 2026 (UTC)

Andre Jason Blake (born 21 November 1990) is a Jamaican professional footballer who plays as a goalkeeper for the Philadelphia Union of Major League Soccer and captains the Jamaica national team.

== Early career ==
After playing with Sporting Central Academy and Harbour View, Blake spent three years playing college soccer at UConn, before signing a Generation Adidas contract with Major League Soccer. He registered 37 shutouts over his three years in goal for the Huskies, winning the Big East Goalkeeper of the Year Award in 2011 and 2012 and the AAC Goalkeeper of the Year Award in 2013. He was named a semifinalist for the Hermann Trophy in 2013.

== Club career ==
Blake was selected by Philadelphia Union first overall in the 2014 MLS SuperDraft. Originally anticipated to be the Union's starting goalkeeper, he was deputized to the bench when the Union signed designated player Raïs M'Bolhi. Blake made his first appearance for the Union in a friendly match against Crystal Palace in July 2014. He made his first competitive start for the Union in a 1–0 win against Montreal Impact, who debuted Didier Drogba as their new designated player. Blake started for five of the remaining eight matches in the 2015 season. On 26 September 2015, playing against New England Revolution, Blake set a Union team record for saves in a match with 10 stops to preserve a 1–1 draw.

During the 2016 season, Blake cemented himself as the clear starting goalkeeper for the Union. In July 2016, he was included in the roster for the 2016 MLS All-Star Game. He was also selected to the 2019 MLS All-Star Game as the Union's only representative.

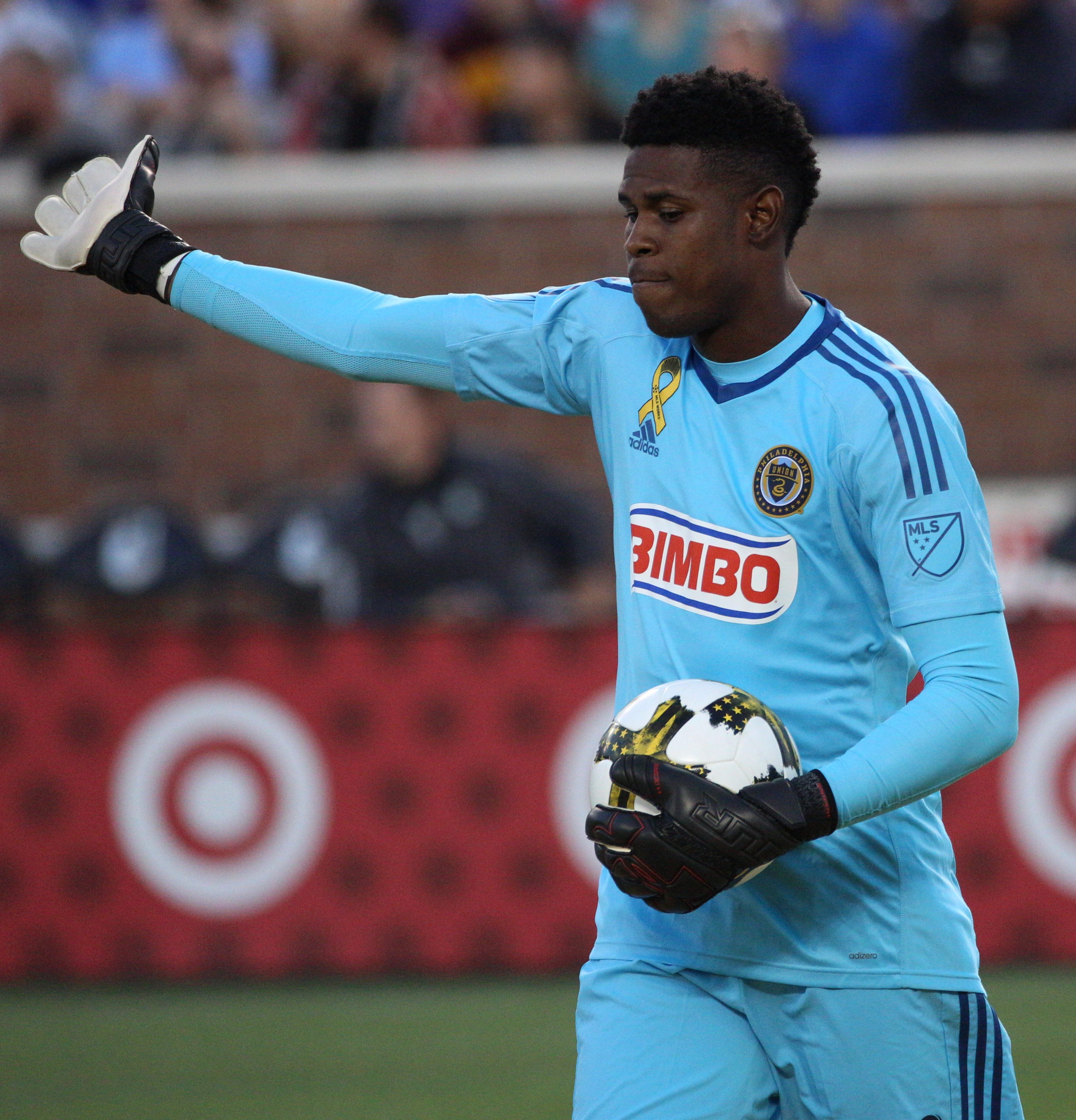
Blake with the Philadelphia Union in 2017.

During the 2020 season, Blake earned accolades for his performances including the Golden Glove for the MLS is Back Tournament, his second MLS Goalkeeper of the Year award, and second selection to the MLS Best XI. Blake posted a 77.8 save percentage and allowed only 18 goals, leading the league in both stats for goalkeepers with 20 or more appearances. He also led the league in wins (13) and posted eight clean sheets.

In July 2021, Blake signed a contract extension with the Union through the 2024 season, with a club option for 2025. In August, Blake was announced as a selection to the 2021 MLS All-Star Game versus the Liga MX All-Stars.

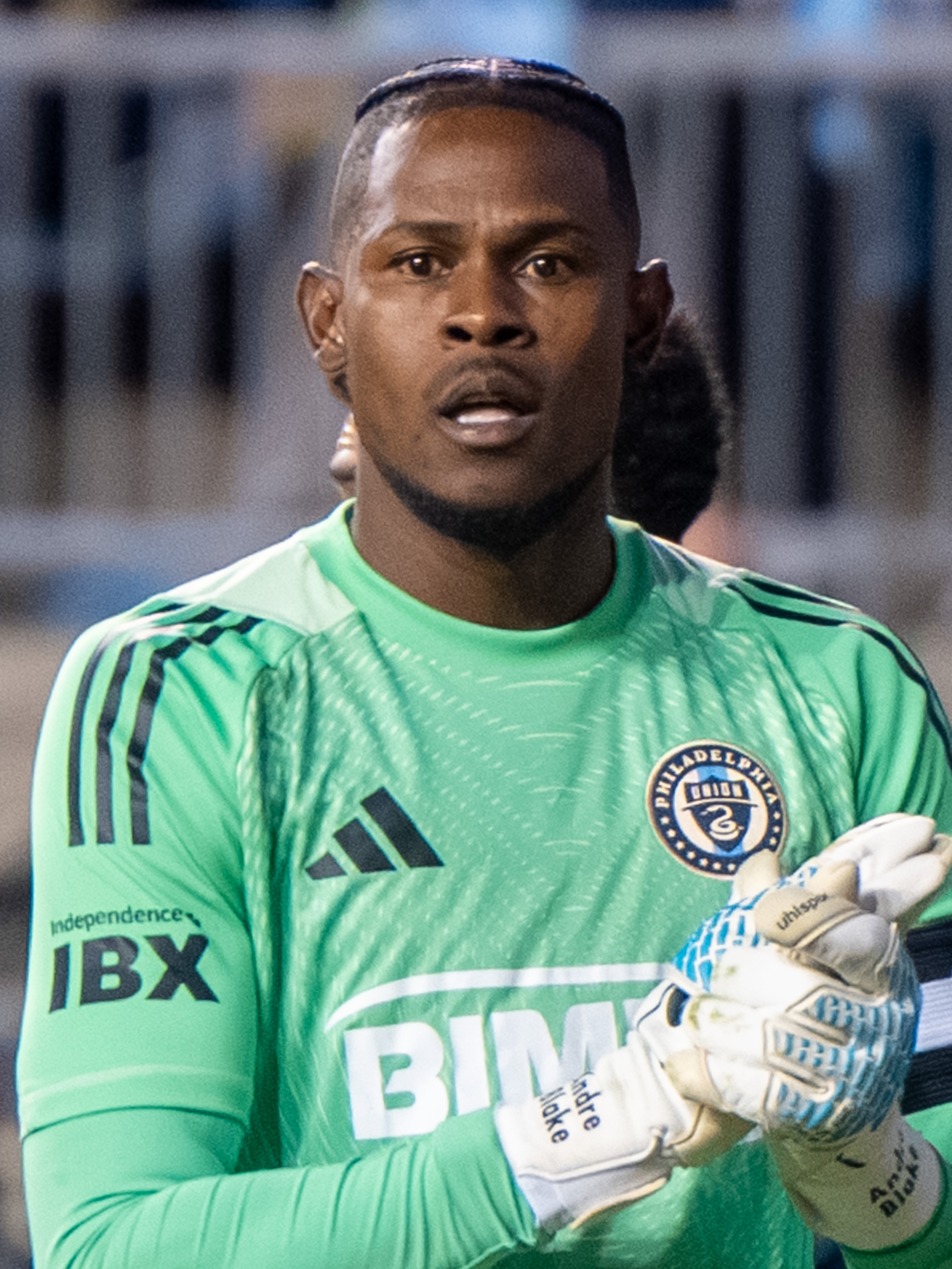
Blake with the Philadelphia Union in 2025.

== International career ==
Blake made his debut Jamaica national football team start on 2 March 2014, versus Barbados, a 2–0 win. Blake earned his first medal for Jamaica later that year, winning the 2014 Caribbean Cup and earning the Golden Gloves award in the process.

Blake started all six matches during the 2017 CONCACAF Gold Cup, helping Jamaica advance to the final and ultimately finishing runner-up to the United States. Blake left the final injured due to a hand injury, but was awarded the tournament's Golden Glove (the first Jamaican to do so) and a spot in the Best XI for his performances.

During the 2019 CONCACAF Gold Cup, Blake again started all matches, helping Jamaica win the group stage. The Reggae Boyz won the quarter-final match against Panama, with Blake securing his 14th career shutout via a 1–0 victory. Advancing to the semi-finals, Jamaica was knocked out of the tournament, again by the United States.

During the 2021 CONCACAF Gold Cup, Blake was called up alongside Philadelphia Union teammates Cory Burke and Alvas Powell. Making four appearances for the Reggae Boyz during the competition, Jamaica was ultimately knocked out during the quarterfinals against the United States.

== Personal life ==
Blake is a Christian. He is married, and has two children. He earned his U.S. green card in the summer of 2015, qualifying him as a domestic player for MLS roster purposes. In 2021, Blake and his wife opened a sports bar, Blake's Kickout Sports Bar and Lounge, in his hometown of May Pen.

Produced by Fulwell 73, FIFA released Captains in 2022, an eight-part sports docuseries following six national team captains in their respective 2022 FIFA World Cup qualification campaigns. Blake, representing Jamaica, starred alongside Thiago Silva (Brazil), Luka Modrić (Croatia), Pierre-Emerick Aubameyang (Gabon), Hassan Maatouk (Lebanon) and Brian Kaltak (Vanuatu). It was released by Netflix and also shown on FIFA's own streaming platform, FIFA+.

== Career statistics ==
=== Club ===
As of match played 7 November 2026

Appearances and goals by club, season and competition
| Club | Season | League | | | U.S. Open Cup | | Playoffs | | Continental | | Other | | Total | |
| Club | Season | Division | Apps | Goals | Apps | Goals | Apps | Goals | Apps | Goals | Apps | Goals | Apps | Goals |
|---|---|---|---|---|---|---|---|---|---|---|---|---|---|---|
| Philadelphia Union | 2014 | MLS | 1 | 0 | 2 | 0 | — | | — | | — | | 3 | 0 |
| Philadelphia Union | 2015 | MLS | 6 | 0 | 1 | 0 | — | | — | | — | | 7 | 0 |
| Philadelphia Union | 2016 | MLS | 32 | 0 | 2 | 0 | 1 | 0 | — | | — | | 35 | 0 |
| Philadelphia Union | 2017 | MLS | 26 | 0 | 0 | 0 | — | | — | | — | | 26 | 0 |
| Philadelphia Union | 2018 | MLS | 33 | 0 | 4 | 0 | 1 | 0 | — | | — | | 38 | 0 |
| Philadelphia Union | 2019 | MLS | 26 | 0 | 0 | 0 | 2 | 0 | — | | — | | 28 | 0 |
| Philadelphia Union | 2020 | MLS | 21 (Note: Includes three appearances in MLS is Back Tournament group stage) | 0 | — | | 1 | 0 | — | | 3 (Note: Appearances in MLS is Back Tournament knockout stage) | 0 | 25 | 0 |
| Philadelphia Union | 2021 | MLS | 26 | 0 | — | | 2 | 0 | 6 (Note: Appearances in CONCACAF Champions League/Cup) | 0 | — | | 34 | 0 |
| Philadelphia Union | 2022 | MLS | 34 | 0 | 0 | 0 | 3 | 0 | — | | — | | 37 | 0 |
| Philadelphia Union | 2023 | MLS | 27 | 0 | 1 | 0 | 3 | 0 | 5 | 0 | 7 (Note: Appearances in Leagues Cup) | 0 | 43 | 0 |
| Philadelphia Union | 2024 | MLS | 14 | 0 | — | | — | | 3 | 0 | 7 | 0 | 24 | 0 |
| Philadelphia Union | 2025 | MLS | 21 | 0 | 1 | 0 | 3 | 0 | — | | — | | 25 | 0 |
| Philadelphia Union | 2026 | MLS | 32 | 0 | — | | 0 | 0 | 0 | 0 | 0 | 0 | 32 | 0 |
| Career total | | | 299 | 0 | 11 | 0 | 16 | 0 | 14 | 0 | 17 | 0 | 357 | 0 |

=== International ===
As of match played 5 October 2026

Appearances and goals by national team and year
| National team | Year | Apps | Goals |
|---|---|---|---|
| Jamaica | 2014 | 9 | 0 |
| Jamaica | 2015 | 4 | 0 |
| Jamaica | 2016 | 9 | 0 |
| Jamaica | 2017 | 9 | 0 |
| Jamaica | 2018 | 4 | 0 |
| Jamaica | 2019 | 10 | 0 |
| Jamaica | 2020 | 0 | 0 |
| Jamaica | 2021 | 11 | 0 |
| Jamaica | 2022 | 8 | 0 |
| Jamaica | 2023 | 9 | 0 |
| Jamaica | 2024 | 8 | 0 |
| Jamaica | 2025 | 11 | 0 |
| Jamaica | 2026 | 6 | 0 |
| Total | | 98 | 0 |

== Honours ==
Philadelphia Union

- Supporters' Shield: 2020, 2025
- MLS Cup runner-up: 2022
- U.S. Open Cup runner-up: 2014, 2015, 2018

Jamaica

- Caribbean Cup: 2014; runner-up: 2017
- CONCACAF Gold Cup runner-up: 2015, 2017

Individual

- MLS is Back Tournament Golden Glove: 2020
- MLS is Back Tournament Best XI: 2020
- MLS All-Star: 2016, 2019, 2021, 2022
- MLS Goalkeeper of the Year: 2016, 2020, 2022
- MLS Best XI: 2016, 2020, 2022
- CONCACAF Gold Cup Golden Glove Award: 2017
- CONCACAF Gold Cup Best XI: 2017
