= Matt Jones (footballer, born 1986) =

English football goalkeeper

Personal information
- Full name: Matthew Robert Jones
- Date of birth: 11 May 1986 (age 40)
- Place of birth: Stoke-on-Trent, England
- Position: Goalkeeper

Youth career
- 1995–1999: Port Vale
- 2003–2005: West Bromwich Albion

College career
Years	Team	Apps	(Gls)
2005–2008	Sacred Heart Pioneers		

Senior career*
Years	Team	Apps	(Gls)
2009	Western Mass Pioneers	4	(0)
2009–2011	Santa Clara	29	(0)
2011–2012	União Madeira	21	(0)
2012–2017	Belenenses	85	(0)
2015–2016	→ Tondela (loan)	10	(0)
2016	→ Philadelphia Union (loan)	1	(0)
2016	→ Bethlehem Steel (loan)	5	(0)
2017	Elm City Express	17	(0)
Total		143	(0)

Managerial career
- 2008: Greenwich Cardinals (assistant)
- 2017: Quinnipiac Bobcats (women's assistant)
- 2018–: Quinnipiac Bobcats (assistant)
- * Club domestic league appearances and goals

Matthew Robert Jones (born 11 May 1986) is an English former professional footballer who played as a goalkeeper. He is the lead assistant coach of the Quinnipiac Bobcats.

He spent his entire senior career in the United States and Portugal, where he made 145 appearances for Santa Clara, União da Madeira, Belenenses and Tondela in the latter's professional leagues. He also played a single Major League Soccer game for the Philadelphia Union.

== Playing career ==
=== College and amateur ===
Born in Stoke-on-Trent, Jones was a member of Port Vale's academy from the age of nine. He then played for West Bromwich Albion, making several reserve team appearances from age 17–19.

Jones moved to the United States in 2005, to attend and play college soccer at Sacred Heart University in Fairfield, Connecticut. He helped the team finish fourth in regular season of the Northeast Conference, losing in the playoffs to eventual champions Monmouth University, 1–2.

Jones was selected to the All-Northeast Conference second team, the NSCAA All-New England second team and was voted Male Rookie of the Year as a freshman in 2005, being picked to the All-Northeast Conference first team and the All-Mideast Region second team in 2007 and 2008. In 2009, he was awarded the "All Pioneer" honour on top of being a nominated in the final 30 of the Lowe's Senior CLASS Award in 2009; additionally, he was named NEC Scholar Athlete of the year in 2009, and graduated magna cum laude with a GPA of 3.7 and a degree in Business administration.

=== Professional ===
Jones turned professional in 2009 with the Western Mass Pioneers. He made his professional debut on 25 April of that year in the side's 1–3 opening day away defeat against the Harrisburg City Islanders.

Jones was signed by Portuguese team C.D. Santa Clara, before the start of the 2009–10 season. He immediately made himself first-choice at the second division club, going on to appear in 21 matches out of 30 in that first campaign.

In June 2011, Jones went on trial with Scottish Premier League side Aberdeen. However, nothing came of it, and he continued playing in Portugal's second level, successively representing Madeira's C.F. União and C.F. Os Belenenses.

Jones only missed one league game in 42 for the latter in the 2012–13 campaign, helping it return to the Primeira Liga after three years. He made his debut in the competition on 18 August 2013, in a 0–3 home loss to Rio Ave FC.

On 30 June 2015, Jones was loaned to top flight newcomers C.D. Tondela for the upcoming campaign. He made his competitive debut on 14 August, in a 1–2 home defeat to Sporting Clube de Portugal.

On 9 February 2016, Jones was confirmed as the latest Philadelphia Union signing, arriving on a season-long loan. He made his only Major League Soccer appearance on 1 June in a 3–2 home win over the Columbus Crew as Andre Blake was away with Jamaica at the Copa América Centenario; he had become a father days earlier. In April of the following year, he joined National Premier Soccer League club Elm City Express. He made his debut on 6 May, in a 2–0 win over Greater Lowell United FC.

== Coaching career ==
On 30 March 2017, Jones was announced as assistant coach of the Quinnipiac Bobcats women's soccer team. He joined the staff of the men's team on 12 January 2018.
