= Ken Tribbett =

American soccer player (born 1992)

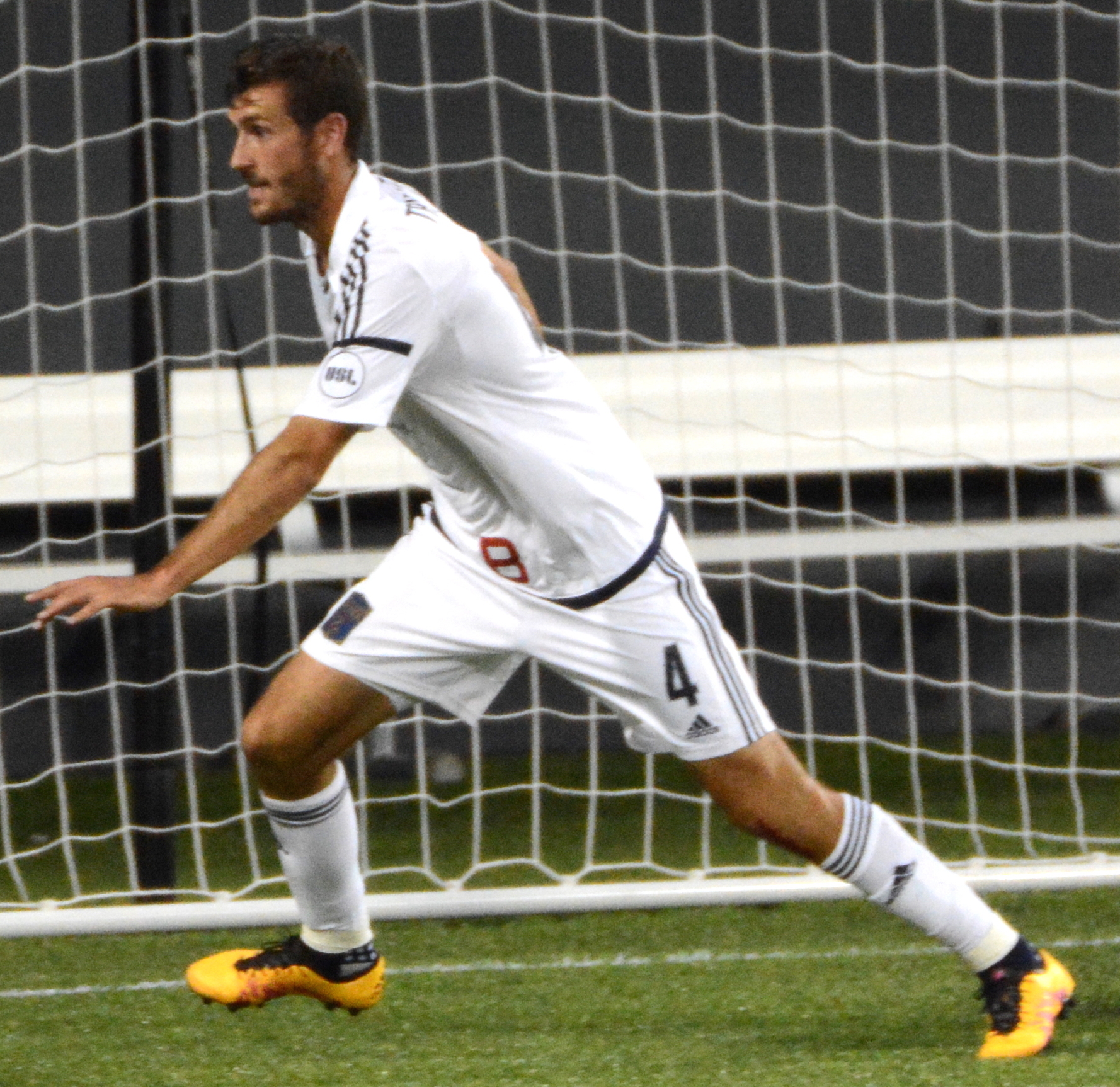
- Tribbett playing for Bethlehem Steel FC in 2017

Personal information
- Date of birth: August 25, 1992 (age 34)
- Place of birth: Centennial, Colorado, United States
- Height: 1.88 m (6 ft 2 in)
- Positions: Defender; midfielder

College career
Years	Team	Apps	(Gls)
2010–2013	Drexel Dragons		

Senior career*
Years	Team	Apps	(Gls)
2013	Ocean City Nor'easters	12	(5)
2014	Michigan Bucks	13	(1)
2015	Harrisburg City Islanders	28	(3)
2016–2017	Philadelphia Union	23	(2)
2016–2017	→ Bethlehem Steel (loan)	13	(1)
2018	Penn FC	21	(6)
2019	Nashville SC	25	(4)
2020	Nashville SC	0	(0)
- * Club domestic league appearances and goals as of October 23, 2019

Ken Tribbett (born August 25, 1992) is an American soccer player.

== Playing career ==
=== College ===
Tribbett played college soccer at Drexel University between 2010 and 2013.

=== Club ===
==== Ocean City Nor'easters ====
While at college, Tribbett appeared for USL PDL club Ocean City Nor'easters in 2013 and played with fellow PDL club Michigan Bucks in 2014 after graduating.

==== Harrisburg City Islanders ====
Tribbett signed with United Soccer League club Harrisburg City Islanders on March 24, 2015. Tribbett would become an immediate contributor to the City Islanders making 28 appearances and scoring 3 goals from the backline. His seasonal performance named him a 2015 USL Rookie of the Year finalist.

==== Philadelphia Union ====
Tribbett moved to USL side Bethlehem Steel on January 29, 2016. After less than a month with Bethlehem Steel, Tribbett signed with Major League Soccer side Philadelphia Union, the parent club to Bethlehem Steel. Originally brought in as depth, Tribbett started the first match of the season against FC Dallas due to impressing in preseason and other roster injury concerns. His first goal for the Union was an equalizer at Orlando City. Tribbett's rookie season would show flashes of promise mixed with damning errors, notably in a home match losing 3–1 to Toronto FC, scoring the Union's only goal but costing several errors. The rookie would struggle against Toronto FC again in the opening game of the playoffs with defensive miscues leading to two of Toronto's three goals.

His appearances with the Union would be limited during the 2017 season making only one league appearance for the Union. Most of his time would be individual loans spells to Bethlehem Steel FC where he would make 12 appearances and scored once. At the end of the season, Tribbett was released from Union.

==== Penn FC ====
Tribbett returned to Harrisburg joining USL side Penn FC on March 2, 2018. He would resume his role as a leader in the newly branded team. Tribbett was appointed captain making 21 appearances and scoring 6 goals (second most for the team) at centerback.

==== Nashville SC ====
USL side Nashville SC announced they had signed Tribbett for the 2019 season on November 28, 2018.

Tribbett remained with Nashville following their move to MLS in 2020. Tribbett's contract with Nashville expired following the 2020 season.
