= Richie Marquez =

American soccer player (born 1992)

Personal information
- Full name: Richard Marquez
- Date of birth: May 26, 1992 (age 34)
- Place of birth: Pomona, California, United States
- Height: 1.88 m (6 ft 2 in)
- Position: Defender

College career
Years	Team	Apps	(Gls)
2010–2013	Redlands Bulldogs	79	(5)

Senior career*
Years	Team	Apps	(Gls)
2014–2018	Philadelphia Union	69	(3)
2014–2015	→ Harrisburg City Islanders (loan)	31	(0)
2017	→ Bethlehem Steel (loan)	4	(1)
- * Club domestic league appearances and goals as of November 1, 2018

Richard "Richie" Marquez (born May 26, 1992) is an American former professional soccer player who played as a defender. He was selected by the Philadelphia Union in the third round of the 2014 MLS SuperDraft and played four seasons in Major League Soccer (MLS). Marquez also spent time on loan with the Harrisburg City Islanders and Bethlehem Steel FC.

== Career ==
=== Education ===
Marquez went to Bloomington High School and graduated in 2010. He was a four-year starter for the University of Redlands Bulldogs in NCAA Division III. He received a Bachelor of Arts degree in communicative disorders in April 2014.

=== Professional ===
Marquez was the 44th selection in the 2014 MLS SuperDraft. For the 2014 season, he was loaned to the Harrisburg City Islanders of USL Pro. While there, he played an integral role in leading Harrisburg to the USL PRO championship game.

Marquez made his Major League Soccer debut on May 2, 2015, coming on as a fifth-minute substitute in a 1–0 loss against Toronto FC. He later earned a regular starting role in the Union lineup during the 2015 season. On July 14, 2015, Marquez scored his first goal for the Union in the 36th minute of a friendly match against English Premier League side AFC Bournemouth at Talen Energy Stadium.

During the 2016 season, Marquez became a key part of the Union's defense, starting 33 league matches. He scored his first MLS goal on April 23, 2016, netting the game-winning goal in a 1–0 victory over D.C. United.

Marquez continued as a regular contributor during the 2017 season, making 22 league appearances. In 2018, he spent time with the club's USL Championship affiliate Bethlehem Steel FC.
