= Cole Missimo =

American soccer player

Personal information
- Full name: Colton Missimo
- Date of birth: February 15, 1993 (age 33)
- Place of birth: Dallas, Texas, United States
- Height: 6 ft 1 in (1.85 m)
- Position: Midfielder

Team information
- Current team: Bethlehem Steel
- Number: 19

College career
| Years | Team | Apps | (Gls) |
| 2012–2015 | Northwestern Wildcats | 76 | (7) |

Senior career*
| Years | Team | Apps | (Gls) |
| 2015 | Reading United | 7 | (0) |
| 2016 | Philadelphia Union | 1 | (0) |
| 2016 | → Bethlehem Steel (loan) | 19 | (0) |
- * Club domestic league appearances and goals as of November 15, 2016

Colton "Cole" Missimo (born February 15, 1993) is an American soccer player.

== Career ==
=== Youth and college ===
Missimo attended Prestonwood Christian Academy where he was the team captain as a freshman, sophomore and junior. He was twice named District Offensive Player of the Year in 2010 and 2011. He was also a two-time Texas First-Team All-State and three-time First Team All-District. In 2010, Missimo led Prestonwood to Texas (Private Schools) State Championship. He holds the Prestonwood record for goals in a season with 39, notching 71 goals for his career. He also notched 36 total assists during his sophomore and junior years. Missimo was an eight-year member of Solar Chelsea SC and played in the USSF Developmental Academy with Solar starting in 2009. Missimo played four years of college soccer at Northwestern University between 2012 and 2015. He logged 76 caps, 7 goals, and 12 assists as a member of the Wildcats.

=== Professional ===
On January 19, 2016, Missimo was selected 64th overall in the 2016 MLS SuperDraft by Philadelphia Union.

He made his professional debut with Bethlehem Steel FC on April 3, 2016, starting in a 2–1 loss to FC Cincinnati.
