= Warren Creavalle =

Guyanese-American footballer (born 1990)

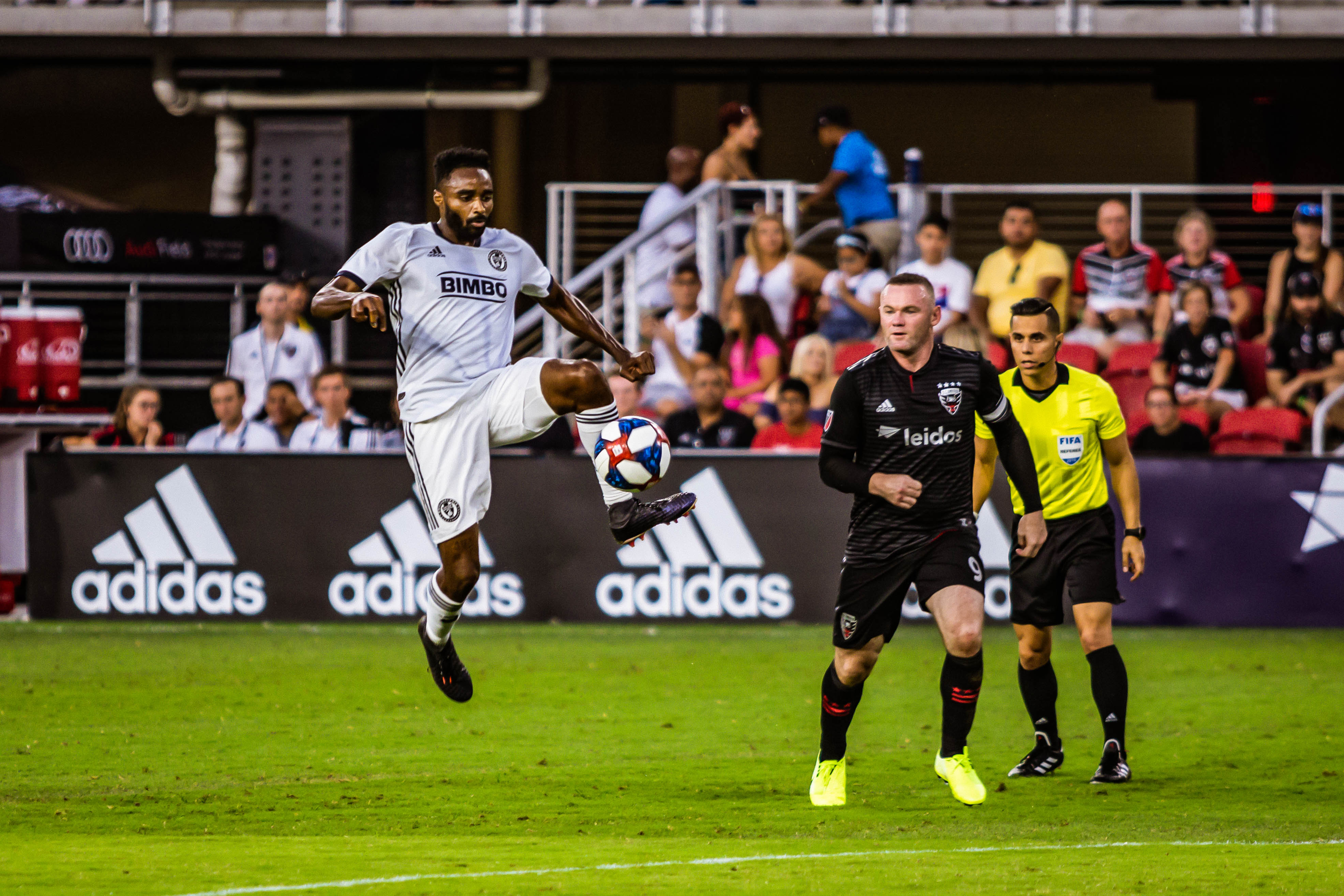
- Creavalle playing for Philadelphia Union

Personal information
- Full name: Warren Creavalle
- Date of birth: August 14, 1990 (age 36)
- Place of birth: Acworth, Georgia, U.S.
- Height: 5 ft 11 in (1.80 m)
- Positions: Defensive midfielder; full back

College career
Years	Team	Apps	(Gls)
2008–2009	Furman Paladins	36	(3)
2010–2011	UCF Knights	37	(5)

Senior career*
Years	Team	Apps	(Gls)
2010	Carolina Dynamo	10	(1)
2012–2014	Houston Dynamo	54	(3)
2014–2015	Toronto FC	24	(2)
2015–2020	Philadelphia Union	86	(0)
Total		175	(6)

International career^{‡}
2008	United States U20	3	(0)
2016–2019	Guyana	4	(0)
- * Club domestic league appearances and goals as of 14:24, 9 November 2020 (UTC) ‡ National team caps and goals as of 23:04, 9 January 2017 (UTC)

Warren Creavalle (born August 14, 1990) is a former footballer who played as a defensive midfielder, central midfielder or rightback. Born in the United States, he represented Guyana at senior international level, after representing the United States at youth international level.

== College and amateur ==
Creavalle appeared in 73 career collegiate games, and he scored eight goals and had 10 assists. He played two years at Furman University before transferring to the University of Central Florida. In 2010, he was named to the All-American Third Team, becoming the first UCF player to earn All-America status since 1997. The following year, Crevalle earned All-Conference USA First Team honors. That year he played in 17 games with 16 starts. He scored one goal and three assists. Creavalle was named to the MAC Hermann Trophy Watch List. Creavalle was also named to All-Conference USA First Team once again. He became the first player in program history to be named to the NSCAA/Performance Subaru All-South Region First Team.

In 2010, he played with the Carolina Dynamo in the Professional Development League.

== Career ==
=== Club ===
==== Houston Dynamo ====
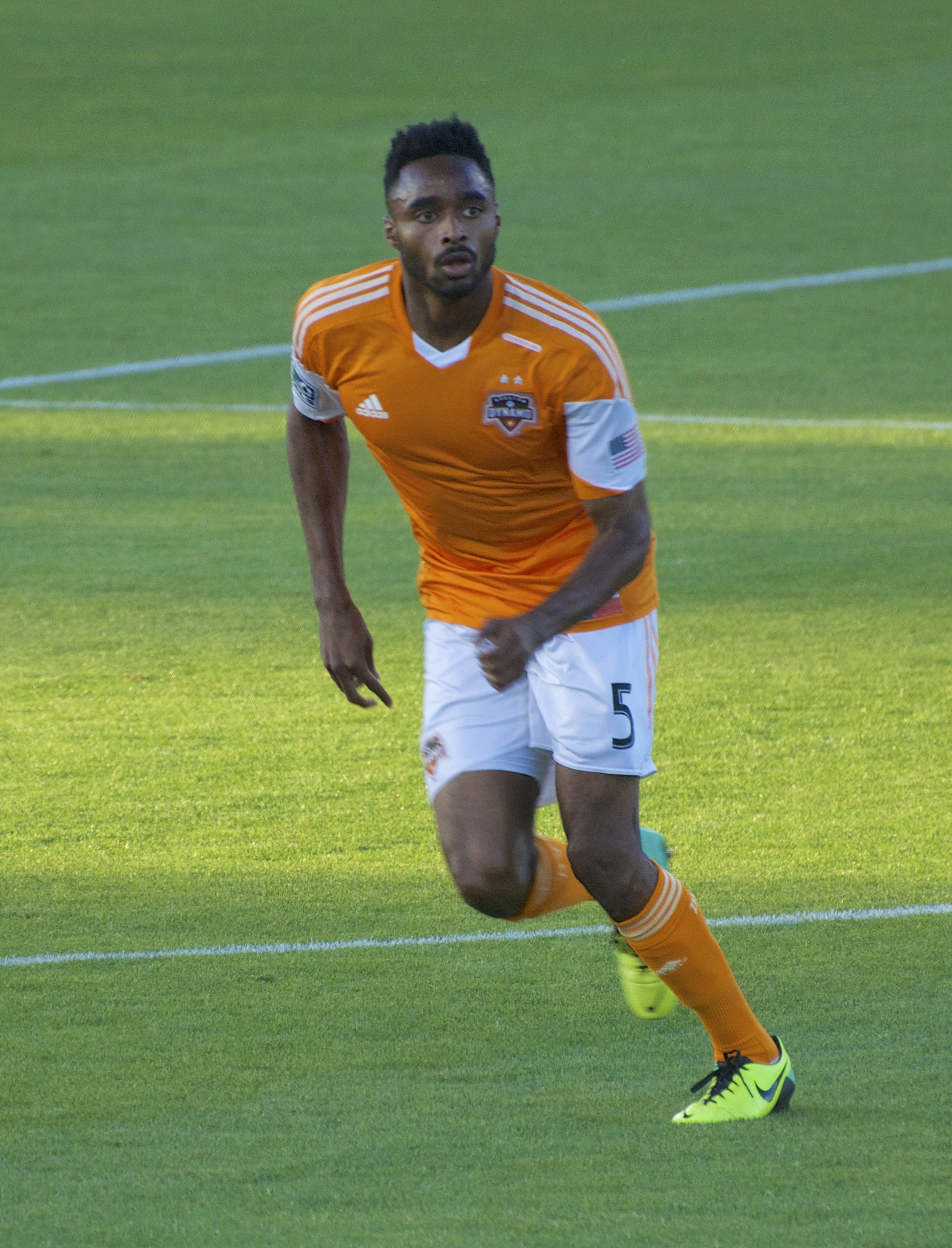
Creavalle in 2014 with Houston Dynamo

Creavalle was selected by the Houston Dynamo with the 37th pick in the second round of the 2012 MLS SuperDraft. After a month-long trial with the team, he was officially signed before the start of the 2012 MLS season. On May 29, 2012, Creavalle made his debut for the Dynamo in a 1–0 defeat to the San Antonio Scorpions in the Lamar Hunt U.S. Open Cup. He played 9 games in the 2012 reserve league season – getting 2 assists. On March 23, 2013, he scored his first Major League Soccer goal against Vancouver Whitecaps – it was the gamewinner in a 2–1 victory. In 2013, he played 5 games with the Houston Dynamo reserve team, scoring 2 goals. He was named the team's Young Player of the Year in 2013.

==== Toronto FC ====
He was traded to Toronto FC on July 23, 2014, for the number one allocation spot to acquire DaMarcus Beasley. He scored his first goal for Toronto FC on October 18, 2014, in a 1–1 tie with Montreal Impact.

==== Philadelphia Union ====
On August 7, 2015, Creavalle was traded from Toronto FC to Philadelphia Union for a 2016 MLS SuperDraft 2nd-round pick. He made his Philadelphia Union debut as a substitute in a 0–0 tie against Orlando City SC.

Creavalle's contract option was declined by Philadelphia following their 2020 season.

=== International ===
Creavalle played with US National U-20 team in 2008 during a Fall tour of Spain. He played in games against the reserve teams of Real Madrid, Atletico de Madrid, and Rayo Vallecano.

Creavalle received his first senior national call-up for Guyana for 2017 Caribbean Cup qualification on October 10, 2016. Creavalle made his debut for the Guyana national football team in a 3–2 loss to Suriname. In 2019, He returned to the side in an encounter against Belize, He made a substitute appearance as Guyana defeated the Central American team 2–1, which qualified Guyana for the CONCACAF Gold Cup for the very first time in their history. He was named to the final Gold Cup squad on May 30, 2019. However, Creavalle was ruled out of the final tournament after breaking his foot in training on June 11.

== Honours ==
=== Club ===
Philadelphia Union

- Supporters' Shield: 2020
