= Roland Alberg =

Surinamese footballer

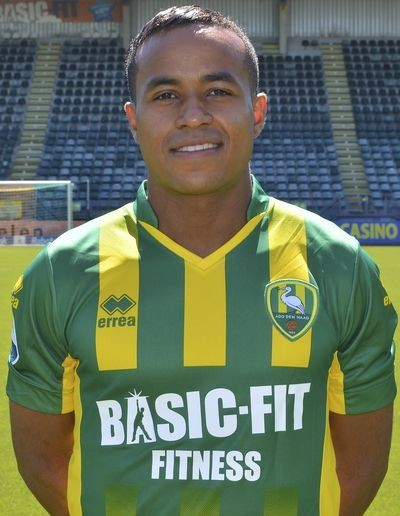
- Alberg with ADO Den Haag in 2015

Personal information
- Full name: Roland Romario Alberg
- Date of birth: 6 August 1990 (age 36)
- Place of birth: Hoorn, Netherlands
- Height: 1.80 m (5 ft 11 in)
- Position: Midfielder

Youth career
- De Blokkers
- Hollandia
- AZ

Senior career*
Years	Team	Apps	(Gls)
2011–2013	Excelsior	52	(11)
2013	Elazığspor	3	(0)
2013–2016	ADO Den Haag	71	(16)
2016–2017	Philadelphia Union	52	(16)
2018	CSKA Sofia	11	(4)
2018–2019	Panionios	3	(1)
2019–2021	Roda JC Kerkrade	39	(17)
2021	→ Hyderabad FC (loan)	8	(1)
2021–2022	MVV	20	(0)

International career^{‡}
2007–2008	Netherlands U18	3	(1)
2011–2012	Netherlands U20	4	(1)
2021–	Suriname	5	(1)
- * Club domestic league appearances and goals as of 12:13, 10 July 2022 (UTC) ‡ National team caps and goals as of 13:53, 3 January 2022

Roland Romario Alberg (Dutch pronunciation: [ˈroːlɑnt ˈɑlbɛr(ə)x]; born 6 August 1990) is a professional footballer who plays as a midfielder. Born in the Netherlands, he plays for the Suriname national team.

== Club career ==
=== Netherland and Turkey ===
After coming through the AZ Alkmaar youth system, Alberg made his professional debut with Eredivisie side Excelsior in the 2011/12 season and moved to Turkish outfit Elazığspor in January 2013 after falling out with the Rotterdam club who claimed he had spit at his own supporters. ADO Den Haag however claimed Alberg had also signed a contract with them.

He finally joined Den Haag in September 2013. Between 2013 and 2016, he appeared in 71 league matches for ADO, scoring sixteen goals.

=== Philadelphia Union ===
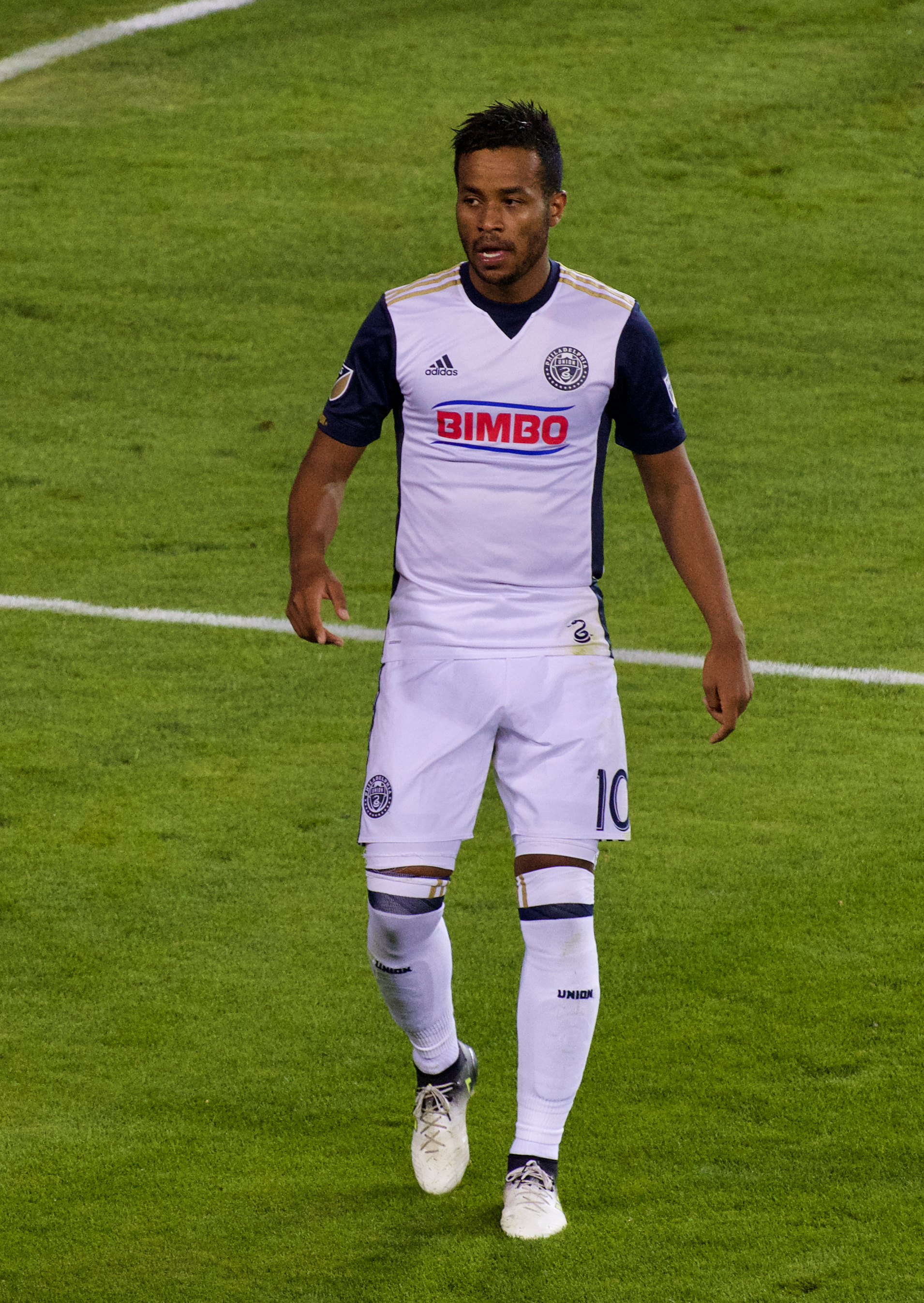
Alberg with Philadelphia Union in 2017

Alberg was acquired by the Philadelphia Union in February 2016. On 1 November 2017, after two years with the club, his 2018 option was declined by the Union.

=== CSKA Sofia ===
It was announced on 31 October 2017 that Alberg signed a two-year contract with CSKA Sofia. He officially joined the club on 1 January 2018 at the conclusion of his MLS contract, but was released at the end of the 2017–18 season.

=== Panionios ===
On 13 June 2018, he joined Super League Greece club Panionios. He has appeared in three league matches, scoring one goal.

=== Roda JC Kerkrade ===
Alberg plied his trade with Roda JC in the second tier of the Dutch League system Eerste Divisie in 2019. He appeared in 39 league matches for the side and scored seventeen goals before his loan transfer to Hyderabad.

=== Hyderabad FC ===
On 28 December 2020, it was announced that Alberg would join Indian Super League side Hyderabad on loan from Dutch team Roda JC Kerkrade as their 7th foreign recruit when the winter transfer window opened on 1 January 2021.

"I have played in many teams, in different countries around the world. But Hyderabad FC will be the first club in Asia for me and I cannot wait to get started".

— Roland Alberg, after agreeing to switch to the Indian Super League.

He made his debut for Hyderabad on 16 January 2021 against Mumbai City, coming on as a substitute in the 74th minute.

On 22 February, he scored his first ever goal for Hyderabad against ATK Mohun Bagan in a 2–2 draw match.

== International career ==
Born in the Netherlands, Alberg currently holds the Surinamese citizenship. He has represented Nederlands U18 from 2007 to 2008. He has also represented U20 between 2011 and 2012.

He played an unofficial friendly match for the Suriname national team against Curaçao in May 2015.

In October 2020, he has been called up to the national squad of Suriname by coach Dean Gorré after receiving the green light from FIFA to call-up eight Dutch origin players including several that currently play in the Netherlands. In February 2021, he has been called up to the Suriname national team for the upcoming 2022 FIFA World Cup Qualifiers in the CONCACAF (North and Central America) region, where Suriname were slated to play against Cayman Islands (24 March) and Aruba (27 March) in the first round of the qualifiers.

Alberg made his official international debut for Suriname against Cayman Islands in a 2022 FIFA World Cup qualification match on 24 March 2021. He scored his first goal against Aruba on 27 March in a 6–0 win. In June 2021 Alberg was named to the Suriname squad for the 2021 CONCACAF Gold Cup.

== Personal life ==
He is a younger brother of former player Ibad Muhamadu and an uncle of Lorenzo Ebecilio.

== Honours ==
=== Club ===
CSKA Sofia

- Bulgarian First League runner-up: 2017–18

== See also ==
- Surinamese footballers
