= Sorin Stoica =

American soccer referee (born 1976)

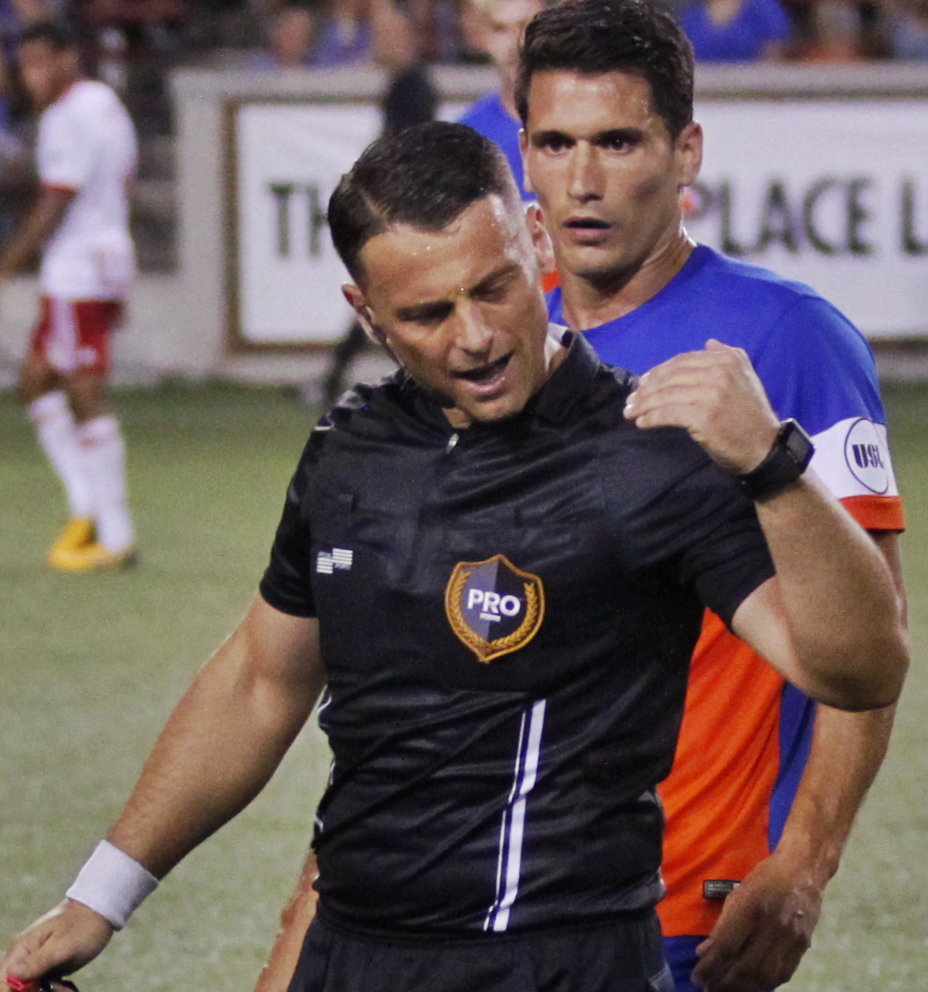
- Stoica in 2017
- Full name: Sorin Stoica
- Born: 5 January 1976 (age 50); Romania

Domestic
Years	League	Role
2012–2018	Major League Soccer	Referee
2019-2025	Major League Soccer	VAR

Sorin Stoica (born January 5, 1976, in Romania) is an American soccer referee from Ohio. Stoica made his Major League Soccer refereeing debut in a 2012 match between the Houston Dynamo and the New York Red Bulls.

== Notable matches ==
On September 8, 2013, Stoica sent off New England Revolution goalkeeper Matt Reis in the fifth minute after Reis fouled Montreal Impact forward Marco Di Vaio in the box. Reis had gone to ground to attempt to block a shot and tripped Di Vaio with his hand after Di Vaio misplayed the ball.

On 5 July 2015, Stoica sent off Orlando City SC star Kaká for the first time in the Brazilian's long career after the 31-year-old midfielder stomped on a Real Salt Lake player.

On July 29, 2015, Stoica was the fourth official to Ismail Elfath for the 2015 MLS All-Star Game.

Stoica transitioned to being a VAR only, after the 2018 season.

In 2026, Stoica was removed from the VAR roster, and became a PRO2 referee coach.
