= Anderson Conceição =

Brazilian footballer (born 1989)

Personal information
- Full name: Anderson Conceição Benedito
- Date of birth: 24 October 1989 (age 37)
- Place of birth: Caravelas, Brazil
- Height: 1.88 m (6 ft 2 in)
- Position: Centre back

Team information
- Current team: Figueirense
- Number: 4

Youth career
- 2004: Bahia
- 2005: Vasco da Gama
- 2006–2008: Santos
- 2008: Mogi Mirim

Senior career*
Years	Team	Apps	(Gls)
2009–2010	Mogi Mirim	20	(2)
2011	Resende	17	(0)
2011–2017	Tombense	0	(0)
2011–2012	→ Criciúma (loan)	41	(5)
2012	→ Figueirense (loan)	14	(1)
2012–2013	→ Mallorca (loan)	19	(0)
2013	→ Atlético Goianiense (loan)	14	(0)
2014	→ Bahia (loan)	5	(0)
2014	→ Joinville (loan)	8	(0)
2015	→ América Mineiro (loan)	43	(1)
2016	→ Philadelphia Union (loan)	1	(0)
2016	→ Bethlehem Steel (loan)	13	(0)
2017	São Bernardo	7	(0)
2017	Chaves	2	(0)
2018	CRB	51	(2)
2019	Umm Salal	7	(1)
2019–2021	Cuiabá	100	(6)
2022–2023	Vasco da Gama	49	(1)
2023	CRB	20	(1)
2024	Vila Nova	20	(1)
2024	São Bernardo	2	(0)
2025	Boavista SC	20	(0)
2026–	Figueirense	7	(0)
- * Club domestic league appearances and goals as of 06:21, 28 October 2021 (UTC)

Anderson Conceição Benedito (born 24 October 1989), known as Anderson Conceição, is a Brazilian footballer who plays as a centre back for Figueirense.

== Career ==
Conceição joined Tombense Futebol Clube in June 2011, but has spent the majority of his tenure on various loan spells at larger clubs.

During the 2012–2013 season, Conceição played for La Liga's RCD Mallorca, appearing in 19 matches in all competitions including two matches in the Copa del Rey.

In 2015, Conceição played for América Mineiro, where he appeared in 30 matches while helping the team achieve promotion to Série A for the 2016 season.

=== Philadelphia Union ===
On 13 January 2016, Conceição was loaned to the Philadelphia Union on a season-long loan.

== Honours ==
Cuiabá

- Campeonato Mato-Grossense: 2021
