= 2018 Bethlehem Steel FC season =

Bethlehem Steel FC
2018 season
- Ownership Group: Keystone S&E
- Head coach: Brendan Burke
- Stadium: Goodman Stadium
- USL: 6th place, Eastern Conference
- USL Playoffs: Semi-finals
- Top goalscorer: Michee Ngalina (7)
- Highest home attendance: 3,342 (Jun 9 vs. Louisville)
- Lowest home attendance: 262 (Oct 14 vs. Tampa Bay)
- Average home league attendance: 1,795
| Home colors | Away colors |

The 2018 season was Bethlehem Steel FC's third season of competitive soccer in the United Soccer League and second season competing in the second division of American soccer. Steel FC competed in the league's Eastern Conference.

== Roster ==
Note: Flags indicate national team as defined under FIFA eligibility rules; some limited exceptions apply. Players may hold more than one non-FIFA nationality. Squad correct as of March 23, 2018.

| No. | Pos. | Nation | Player |
|---|---|---|---|
| 1 | GK | USA | John McCarthy |
| 4 | DF | USA | Mark McKenzie |
| 8 | MF | USA | Derrick Jones |
| 14 | MF | GER | Fabian Herbers |
| 15 | DF | GHA | Joshua Yaro |
| 19 | FW | JAM | Cory Burke |
| 20 | MF | USA | Marcus Epps |
| 21 | MF | USA | Anthony Fontana |
| 24 | MF | USA | Adam Najem |
| 28 | DF | USA | Ray Gaddis |
| 29 | GK | USA | Jake McGuire |
| 30 | MF | CMR | Eric Ayuk |
| 32 | DF | USA | Matthew Real |
| 36 | MF | JAM | Omar Holness |
| 37 | FW | CAN | Chris Nanco |
| 38 | FW | ESP | Santi Moar |
| 39 | MF | USA | Drew Skundrich |
| 40 | FW | USA | Brandon Allen |
| 41 | MF | USA | Mike Catalano |
| 42 | FW | USA | Aidan Apodaca |
| 43 | DF | ZAM | Prosper Chiluya (on loan from Kafue Celtic) |
| 44 | DF | USA | Brandon Aubrey |
| 45 | MF | IRL | James Chambers |
| 47 | DF | CMR | Olivier Mbaizo |
| 48 | DF | USA | Matt Mahoney |
| 49 | MF | USA | A. J. Paterson |
| 50 | FW | USA | Tonny Temple |
| 52 | FW | USA | Issa Rayyan |
| 53 | DF | USA | Ben Ofeimu |
| 62 | GK | USA | Kris Shakes |
| 63 | MF | USA | Brenden Aaronson |
| 64 | GK | ESA | Tomás Romero |
| 68 | MF | USA | Michael Pellegrino |

Signed to first team contract with Philadelphia Union.
Philadelphia Union Academy player.

== Transfers ==
=== In ===
| Date | Player | Number | Position | Previous club | Fee/notes |
|---|---|---|---|---|---|
| January 8, 2018 | (United States) Brandon Allen | 40 | FW | (United States) New York Red Bulls | Signed |
| January 9, 2018 | (Jamaica) Omar Holness | 36 | MF | (United States) Real Salt Lake | Signed |
| January 10, 2018 | (United States) Brandon Aubrey | 44 | DF | (Canada) Toronto FC II | Signed |
| January 22, 2018 | (Cameroon) Olivier Mbaizo | 47 | DF | (Cameroon) Rainbow FC | Signed |
| February 19, 2018 | (United States) A. J. Paterson | 49 | MF | (United States) Wright State Raiders | Signed |
| February 21, 2018 | (United States) Aidan Apodaca | 42 | FW | (United States) California Baptist Lancers | 2018 Philadelphia Union Draft Signing |
| March 1, 2018 | (United States) Mike Catalano | 41 | MF | (United States) Wisconsin Badgers | 2018 Philadelphia Union Draft Signing |
| March 14, 2018 | (United States) Drew Skundrich | 41 | MF | (United States) Stanford Cardinal | Signed |
| April 25, 2018 | (Democratic Republic of the Congo) Michee Ngalina | 46 | FW | (United States) Montverde Eagles | Signed |
| July 16, 2018 | (Cameroon) Faris Pemi Moumbagna | 35 | FW | (United States) Montverde Eagles | Signed |
| September 12, 2018 | (United States) Selmir Miscic | 55 | MF | (United States) Philadelphia Union Academy | Signed |

=== Out ===
| Date | Player | Number | Position | New club | Fee/notes |
|---|---|---|---|---|---|
| November 2, 2017 | (Liberia) Seku Conneh | 36 | FW | (South Korea) Ansan Greeners FC | Contract expired |
| November 2, 2017 | (Jamaica) Amoy Brown | 39 | FW | (Malta) St. Andrews | Option declined |
| November 2, 2017 | (Canada) Josh Heard | 40 | MF | (United States) Real Monarchs | Contract expired |
| November 2, 2017 | (United States) Hugh Roberts | 42 | DF | (United States) Pittsburgh Riverhounds SC | Option declined |
| November 2, 2017 | (Norway) Chris Wingate | 43 | DF | (Norway) Bærum SK | Option declined |
| November 2, 2017 | (United States) Charlie Reymann | 44 | DF | —N/a | Option declined |
| November 2, 2017 | (United States) Yosef Samuel | 49 | MF | (United States) Atlanta United 2 | Contract expired |
| December 21, 2017 | (Jamaica) Cory Burke | 41 | FW | (United States) Philadelphia Union | Signed to MLS Contract |
| January 18, 2018 | (United States) Matthew Real | 47 | DF | (United States) Philadelphia Union | Signed to MLS Contract |
| May 22, 2018 | (United States) Brandon Allen | 40 | FW | (United States) Nashville SC | Transfer |

=== Loan in ===
| Date | Player | Number | Position | Parent club | Fee/notes |
|---|---|---|---|---|---|
| February 20, 2018 | (Zambia) Prosper Chiluya | 43 | DF | (Zambia) Kafue Celtic | On loan for 2018 season |
| March 18, 2018 | (United States) John McCarthy | 1 | GK | (United States) Philadelphia Union | First team/short-term loan |
| March 18, 2018 | (United States) Mark McKenzie | 4 | DF | (United States) Philadelphia Union | First team/short-term loan |
| March 18, 2018 | (United States) Derrick Jones | 8 | MF | (United States) Philadelphia Union | First team/short-term loan |
| March 18, 2018 | (United States) Marcus Epps | 20 | MF | (United States) Philadelphia Union | First team/short-term loan |
| March 18, 2018 | (United States) Adam Najem | 24 | MF | (United States) Philadelphia Union | First team/short-term loan |
| March 18, 2018 | (Cameroon) Eric Ayuk | 30 | MF | (United States) Philadelphia Union | First team/short-term loan |
| March 18, 2018 | (United States) Matthew Real | 32 | DF | (United States) Philadelphia Union | First team/short-term loan |

== Competitions ==
=== Preseason ===
| February 10 Preseason | Bethlehem Steel FC | 3–4 | FC Motown | Wayne, Pennsylvania |
| 14:00 EDT | Chambers 7'; Amoh 63'; Apodaca 88' | Report | Nigro 18', 23'; Garcia 75'; Lawrence 79' | Stadium: YSC Academy |

| February 17 Preseason | Bethlehem Steel FC | 11–1 | Junior Lone Star FC U-23s | Wayne, Pennsylvania |
| 14:00 EDT | Allen 11'; Aaronson 18', 50'; Gallardo 27'; Rayyan 40', 86'; Moar 52', 58' (pen.); Messam 73', 79'; Temple 83' | Report | Mansaray 68' (pen.) | Stadium: YSC Academy |

| February 21 Preseason | Bethlehem Steel FC | 5–2 | Penn FC | Wayne, Pennsylvania |
| 13:30 EDT | Jepson 61'; Apodaca 74'; Temple 77', 83'; Aaronson 89' | Report | Muhammad 4'; Dennis 79' | Stadium: YSC Academy |

| February 24 Preseason | Bethlehem Steel FC | 2–0 | Syracuse University | Wayne, Pennsylvania |
| 14:00 EDT | Allen 25' (pen.); Jepson 29' | Report | | Stadium: YSC Academy |

| February 28 Preseason | Villanova University | 3–2 | Bethlehem Steel FC | Villanova, Pennsylvania |
| 15:15 EDT | Zandi 21'; Cueceoglu 54' (pen.); Manson 67' | Report | Paterson 36'; Apodaca 90' | Stadium: Higgins Soccer Complex |

| March 3 Preseason | Loyola University | 0–5 | Bethlehem Steel FC | Baltimore, Maryland |
| | | Report | Apodaca; Allen; Catalano; Nanco (pen.) | Stadium: Ridley Athletic Complex |
Note: Closed-door scrimmage

| March 4 Preseason | Bethlehem Steel FC | 0–2 | Pittsburgh Riverhounds | Chester, Pennsylvania |
| 15:00 EDT | | Report | Kerr 5'; Pratzner (yellow card) 73'; Dover 90' | Stadium: Power Training Complex |

| March 6 Preseason | University of Maryland | 2–2 | Bethlehem Steel FC | College Park, Maryland |
| 19:15 EDT | Matzelevich (o.g.) | | Moar; Allen | Stadium: Ludwig Field |

| March 10 Preseason | New York Red Bulls II | 3–1 | Bethlehem Steel FC | Whippany, New Jersey |
| 12:15 EDT | Aguinaga; Bailon; Moreno | | | Stadium: RBNY Training Facility |
Note: Closed-door scrimmage

=== USL regular season ===
The 2018 USL season will be contested by 33 teams, 16 of which compete in the league's Eastern Conference. All teams will play a regular season total of 34 matches between teams within their respective conference. At the conclusion of the regular season, the top eight teams from each conference advance to the 2018 USL Playoffs for a chance to compete for the USL Championship Title.

==== Standings (Eastern Conference) ====
| Pos | Team | Pld | W | D | L | GF | GA | GD | Pts | Qualification |
|---|---|---|---|---|---|---|---|---|---|---|
| 4 | Charleston Battery | 34 | 14 | 14 | 6 | 47 | 34 | +13 | 56 | Conference Playoffs |
| 5 | New York Red Bulls II | 34 | 13 | 13 | 8 | 71 | 59 | +12 | 52 | Conference Playoffs |
| 6 | Bethlehem Steel FC | 34 | 14 | 8 | 12 | 56 | 41 | +15 | 50 | Conference Playoffs |
| 7 | Indy Eleven | 34 | 13 | 10 | 11 | 45 | 42 | +3 | 49 | Conference Playoffs |
| 8 | Nashville SC | 34 | 12 | 13 | 9 | 42 | 31 | +11 | 49 | Conference Playoffs |

Source: 2018 USL standings
Rules for classification: 1) total wins; 2) total goal differential; 3) total goals scored; 4) points earned against top four Conference finishers; 5) disciplinary points; 6) coin toss or drawing of lots

==== Results ====
All times in Eastern Time.

| March 18 1 | Bethlehem Steel FC | 4–1 | Richmond Kickers | Bethlehem, Pennsylvania |
| 14:00 | Ayuk 24'; Jones 40'; Allen 64', 89' | Report; Box Score | Umar 57' | Stadium: Goodman Stadium; Attendance: 3,284; Referee: Marcos de Oliveira |

| March 24 2 | Tampa Bay Rowdies | 2–0 | Bethlehem Steel FC | St. Petersburg, Florida |
| | Hristov 62'; Fernandes 68'; Najem (yellow card) 90' | Report | Herbers (yellow card) 54' | Stadium: Al Lang Stadium; Attendance: 7,368; Referee: Rubiel Vazquez |

| March 31 3 | Bethlehem Steel FC | 0–1 | Nashville SC | Bethlehem, Pennsylvania |
| | Aubrey (red card) 5'; Chambers (yellow card) 59' | Report | Cox 6' (pen.); Davis (yellow card) 79' | Stadium: Goodman Stadium; Attendance: 2,220; Referee: Brandon Smith |

| April 8 4 | Bethlehem Steel FC | 1–1 | Charleston Battery | Bethlehem, Pennsylvania |
| 15:00 | Burke 45+4'; Ayuk (yellow card) 89' | Report; USL Report | Thomas 42' van Schaik (yellow card) 55'; Cordovés (yellow card) 86' | Stadium: Goodman Stadium; Attendance: 1,625; Referee: Lorant Varga |

| April 15 5 | Bethlehem Steel FC | 1–1 | FC Cincinnati | Bethlehem, Pennsylvania |
| 14:00 | Burke 15' (yellow card) 83'; Chiluya (yellow card) 66' | Report | Albadawi 72' | Stadium: Goodman Stadium; Attendance: 1,418; Referee: Amber O'Connor |

| April 28 6 | Louisville City FC | 3–1 | Bethlehem Steel FC | Louisville, Kentucky |
| 7:30 PM | Lancaster 13', 22'; Ilić 17'; Ownby (yellow card) 73' | Report | Mbaizo (yellow card) 24'; Epps 44' | Stadium: Louisville Slugger Field; Attendance: 7,876; Referee: David Barrie |

| May 6 7 | Bethlehem Steel FC | 3–1 | Richmond Kickers | Bethlehem, Pennsylvania |
| 5:00 PM | Real 29'; Moar 68'; Skundrich (yellow card) 72'; Nanco 83' (pen.) | Report | Cordovés 15' (yellow card) 36'; Yearwood (yellow card) 72'; Umar (yellow card) 79'; Lee (yellow card) 85' | Stadium: Goodman Stadium; Attendance: 2,116; Referee: Thomas Snyder |

| May 12 8 | Charleston Battery | 2–1 | Bethlehem Steel FC | Charleston, South Carolina |
| 7:00 PM | Candela (yellow card) 20'; Rittmeyer (yellow card) 31'; Guerra 44'; Wild 53' | Report | Mbaizo (yellow card) 9'; Jones 65' (pen.) | Stadium: MUSC Health Stadium; Attendance: 4,659; Referee: Daniel Gutierrez |

| May 16 9 | Bethlehem Steel FC | 3–0 | New York Red Bulls II | Bethlehem, Pennsylvania |
| 5:00 PM | Ngalina 36'; Herbers 63'; Najem 90+4' | Report | | Stadium: Goodman Stadium; Attendance: 1,721; Referee: Jaroslaw Werel |

| May 19 10 | Indy Eleven | 1–2 | Bethlehem Steel FC | Indianapolis, Indiana |
| 8:00 PM | Mitchell (yellow card) 41'; Steinberger 71' | Report | Aubrey (yellow card) 16'; Moar 60'; Chiluya 75'; Jones (yellow card) 84' | Stadium: Lucas Oil Stadium; Attendance: 9,384; Referee: Elvis Osmanovic |

| May 25 11 | Ottawa Fury FC | 1–0 | Bethlehem Steel FC | Ottawa, Ontario |
| 7:00 PM | Oliveira 1'; Attakora (yellow card) 30' | Report | Moar (yellow card) 43' | Stadium: TD Place Stadium; Attendance: 2,781; Referee: Pierre-Luc Lauzière |

| June 2 12 | North Carolina FC | 1–2 | Bethlehem Steel FC | Cary, North Carolina |
| 7:00 PM | Doue 16'; Tobin (yellow card) 57'; Harrington (yellow card) 67' da Luz (yellow card) 89' | Report | Najem (yellow card) 25'; Ofeimu 83'; Ngalina 85' | Stadium: WakeMed Soccer Park; Attendance: 3,526; Referee: Elvis Osmanovic |

| June 9 13 | Bethlehem Steel FC | 0–0 | Louisville City FC | Bethlehem, Pennsylvania |
| 5:00 PM | Fontana (yellow card) 45+5'; Chambers (yellow card) 58' | Report | Craig (yellow card) 48'; McMahon (yellow card) 90' | Stadium: Goodman Stadium; Attendance: 3,342; Referee: Lorant Varga |

| June 13 14 | FC Cincinnati | 2–2 | Bethlehem Steel FC | Cincinnati, Ohio |
| 7:30 PM | Albadawi 66'; Cicerone 68' | Report | Jones 29'; Mbaizo (red card) 52'; Herbers 69' (yellow card) 86' | Stadium: Nippert Stadium; Attendance: 22,407; Referee: Marcos de Oliveira |

| June 20 15 | Bethlehem Steel FC | 2–2 | New York Red Bulls II | Bethlehem, Pennsylvania |
| 5:00 PM | Fontana (yellow card) 35'; Herbers (yellow card) 45+4'; Chambers (yellow card) 51', (goal) 90+4'; Mahoney 88'; Nanco (yellow card) 89' | https://www.uslchampionship.com/news_article/show/928663?referrer_id=3335681 Report | Bonomo 12' (pen.), 84' (yellow card) 66'; Scarlett (yellow card) 29'; Cásseres (yellow card) 81' | Stadium: Goodman Stadium; Attendance: 2,210; Referee: Kevin Broadley |

| June 30 16 | Bethlehem Steel FC | 4–1 | Charlotte Independence | Bethlehem, Pennsylvania |
| 5:00 PM | Nanco 10'; Moar 46'; Skundrich 72'; Herbers 80'; Mbaizo (yellow card) 90+2' | Report | Kalungi (yellow card) 11'; Watson (yellow card) 69'; Areman (yellow card) 83'; Herrera 90+3' | Stadium: Goodman Stadium; Attendance: 2,346; Referee: Matthew Franz |

| July 6 17 | Penn FC | 3–2 | Bethlehem Steel FC | Harrisburg, Pennsylvania |
| 7:00 PM | Opoku 20'; Mkosana 25'; Osae 55' | Report | Marquez (yellow card) 6'; Herbers 17', 82' (pen.), (yellow card) 68'; Chambers (yellow card) 83' | Stadium: FNB Field; Attendance: 3,103; Referee: Bardhyl Pashaj |

| July 11 18 | Atlanta United 2 | 2–1 | Bethlehem Steel FC | Lawrenceville, Georgia |
| 7:00 PM | Robinson (yellow card) 18'; Vazquez 25'; Shannon 50' | Report | Aubrey (yellow card) 43'; Jones 87' | Stadium: Coolray Field; Attendance: 1,658; Referee: Sergii Demianchuk |

| July 14 19 | Bethlehem Steel FC | 1–1 | North Carolina FC | Bethlehem, Pennsylvania |
| 5:00 PM | Kandziora 22' (yellow card) 90+4'; Smith (yellow card) 40'; Fortune (yellow card) 70' | Report | Najem 56'; Chiluya (yellow card) 65'; Holness (yellow card) 83'; Aubrey (yellow card) 90+5' | Stadium: Goodman Stadium; Attendance: 2,749; Referee: Jonathan Bilinski |

| July 18 20 | New York Red Bulls II | 2–1 | Bethlehem Steel FC | Montclair, New Jersey |
| 7:00 PM | Etienne Jr. 28'; Moreno 78' | Report | Moumbagna (yellow card) 42'; Fontana 45+2'; Holness (yellow card) 84' | Stadium: MSU Soccer Park; Attendance: 653; Referee: Daniel Gutierrez |

| July 26 21 | Bethlehem Steel FC | 0–1 | Indy Eleven | Bethlehem, Pennsylvania |
| 11:30 AM | | Report | Guerra (yellow card) 8'; Reiner (yellow card) 43'; Starikov (yellow card) 72'; McInerney 86' | Stadium: Goodman Stadium; Attendance: 2,150; Referee: Nickrod Fateh |

| July 29 22 | Bethlehem Steel FC | 4–1 | Atlanta United 2 | Bethlehem, Pennsylvania |
| 5:00 PM | Mahoney 16'; Apodaca 36'; Moumbagna 71'; Aaronson 72' | Report | Metcalf (yellow card) 24'; Sandoval 40'; Cochran (yellow card) 76' | Stadium: Goodman Stadium; Attendance: 2,416; Referee: Eric Tattersall |

| August 4 23 | Richmond Kickers | 0–3 | Bethlehem Steel FC | Richmond, Virginia |
| 7:00 P.M. | Troyer (yellow card) 48' | Report | Real (yellow card) 18'; Mahoney (yellow card) 45'; Moar 54'; Holness 77'; Ngalina 85' | Stadium: City Stadium; Attendance: 3,254; Referee: José Lara |

| August 8 24 | Charlotte Independence | 0–3 | Bethlehem Steel FC | Matthews, North Carolina |
| 7:30 P.M. | George (yellow card) 35' | Report | Chambers 7'; Real (yellow card) 65'; Holness (yellow card) 74'; Skundrich 89', (yellow card) 90' | Stadium: Sportsplex at Matthews; Attendance: 982; Referee: Amin Hadzic |

| August 12 25 | Bethlehem Steel FC | 1–2 | Pittsburgh Riverhounds SC | Bethlehem, Pennsylvania |
| 5:00 PM EDT | Mahoney (yellow card) 20'; Nanco 52'; Moar (yellow card) 70'; Real (yellow card) 81' | Report | Adewole (yellow card) 26'; Brett 35', 79'; Dover (yellow card) 62' | Stadium: Goodman Stadium; Attendance: 2,752; Referee: Guido Gonzalez, Jr. |

| August 16 26 | Toronto FC II | 0–2 | Bethlehem Steel FC | Rochester, New York |
| | Hundal (yellow card) 39'; Waja (yellow card) 62'; Srbely (yellow card) 66' | Report | Nanco (yellow card) 18'; Ngalina 71'; Apodaca 83' | Stadium: Capelli Sport Stadium; Referee: Matthew Franz |

| August 22 27 | Bethlehem Steel FC | 2–0 | Ottawa Fury FC | Bethlehem, Pennsylvania |
| 5:00 PM | Moar 16', 32' (pen.), (yellow card) 72'; Skundrich (yellow card) 41'; Yaro (yellow card) 84'; Aubrey (yellow card) 90+2' | Report | Meilleur-Giguere (yellow card) 31'; Taylor (yellow card) 49'; Portilla (yellow card) 58'; Haworth (yellow card) 88' | Stadium: Goodman Stadium; Attendance: 2,066; Referee: Jon Freemon |

| August 25 28 | Nashville SC | 1–2 | Bethlehem Steel FC | Nashville, Tennessee |
| 8:30 PM | Jome (yellow card) 27', (yellow card) 31' (red card); Davis 84' | Report | Nanco 23'; Mbaizo (yellow card) 45'; Najem 90+3' | Stadium: First Tennessee Park; Attendance: 8,856; Referee: Leland Grant |

| September 2 29 | Bethlehem Steel FC | 1–3 | Penn FC | Bethlehem, Pennsylvania |
| 3:00 PM | Chambers (yellow card) 5'; Epps 10'; Mahoney (yellow card) 66'; Chiluya (yellow card) 85' | Report | Mkosana (yellow card) 24', (goal) 40'; Dennis 32', (yellow card) 90+1'; Paulo 59' | Stadium: Goodman Stadium; Attendance: 2,643; Referee: Lorant Varga |

| September 7 30 | Pittsburgh Riverhounds SC | 4–1 | Bethlehem Steel FC | Pittsburgh, Pennsylvania |
| 7:00 P.M. | Greenspan 17'; Forbes 45'; Dabo (yellow card) 56'; Brett 76'; Dover 79' | Report | Chambers 35' (pen.); Aubrey (yellow card) 90' | Stadium: Highmark Stadium; Attendance: 1,356; Referee: Daniel Gutierrez |

| September 22 31 | Bethlehem Steel FC | 4–0 | Toronto FC II | Bethlehem, Pennsylvania |
| 3:00 P.M. | Moumbagna 2'; Ngalina 48'; Aubrey (yellow card) 52'; Chambers 57' (pen.); Nanco 75' | Report | Mohammed (yellow card) 36' | Stadium: Goodman Stadium; Attendance: 2,512; Referee: Bardhyl Pashaj |

| September 30 32 | Ottawa Fury FC | 0–0 | Bethlehem Steel FC | Ottawa, Ontario |
| | Edward (yellow card) 75' | Report | Mbaizo (yellow card) 4'; Moar (yellow card) 39'; Ofeimu (yellow card) 59' | Stadium: TD Place Stadium; Attendance: 5,470; Referee: Fabrizio Stasolla |

| October 6 33 | Indy Eleven | 1–1 | Bethlehem Steel FC | Indianapolis, Indiana |
| | Moses (yellow card) 58'; Starikov 61' | Report | Moumbagna 39'; Fontana (yellow card) 74'; Chambers (yellow card) 87' | Stadium: Lucas Oil Stadium; Attendance: 14,894; Referee: Ramy Touchan |

| October 14 34 | Bethlehem Steel FC | 1–0 | Tampa Bay Rowdies | Bethlehem, Pennsylvania |
| | Ngalina 13' (Aaronson); Chambers (yellow card) 44'; Herbers (yellow card) 76' | Report | | Stadium: Goodman Stadium; Attendance: 262; Referee: Sergii Demianchuk |

==== Results summary ====
| Overall | | | | | | | | Home | | | | | | Away | | | | | |
| Pld | Pts | W | L | T | GF | GA | GD | W | L | T | GF | GA | GD | W | L | T | GF | GA | GD |
|---|---|---|---|---|---|---|---|---|---|---|---|---|---|---|---|---|---|---|---|
| 34 | 50 | 14 | 12 | 8 | 56 | 41 | +15 | 8 | 4 | 5 | 32 | 16 | +16 | 6 | 8 | 3 | 24 | 25 | −1 |

Last updated: February 9, 2019
Source: 2018 USL season
Pld = Matches played; Pts = Points; W = Matches won; T = Matches tied; L = Matches lost; GF = Goals for; GA = Goals against; GD = Goal difference

| Round | 1 | 2 | 3 | 4 | 5 | 6 | 7 | 8 | 9 | 10 | 11 | 12 | 13 | 14 | 15 | 16 | 17 | 18 | 19 | 20 | 21 | 22 | 23 | 24 | 25 | 26 | 27 | 28 | 29 | 30 | 31 | 32 | 33 | 34 |
|---|---|---|---|---|---|---|---|---|---|---|---|---|---|---|---|---|---|---|---|---|---|---|---|---|---|---|---|---|---|---|---|---|---|---|
| Stadium | H | A | H | H | H | A | H | A | H | A | A | A | H | A | H | H | A | A | H | A | H | H | A | A | H | A | H | A | H | A | H | A | A | H |
| Result | W | L | L | D | D | L | W | L | W | W | L | W | D | D | D | W | L | L | D | L | L | W | W | W | L | W | W | W | L | L | W | D | D | W |
| Position | 1 | | | | | | | 13 | | 5 | 8 | | | 8 | | 8 | | 10 | | | | | | 6 | | 6 | | | | | | 6 | | 6 |

Source: 2018 USL season and Current USL Standing
A = Away; H = Home; W = Win; D = Draw; L = Loss

=== USL Playoffs ===
| October 20, 2018 Quarterfinal | Pittsburgh Riverhounds SC | 2–2 (a.e.t.) (7–8 p) | Bethlehem Steel FC | Pittsburgh, Pennsylvania |
| 7:00 PM EDT | Zemanski 25'; Dover (yellow card) 86'; Roberts 105' (yellow card) 109'; Forbes (yellow card) 113'; Holland (red card) 119' | Report | Moumbagna (yellow card) 45'; Ngalina 70'; Chambers 109'; Nanco (yellow card) 111' | Stadium: Highmark Stadium; Attendance: 5,189; Referee: Michael Radchuk |
| | Penalties |
| | Kerr (penalty scored); Forbes (penalty scored); Banjo (penalty scored); Greenspan (penalty scored); François (penalty scored); Vancaeyezeele (penalty scored); Dabo (penalty scored); Lee (penalty missed) | | (penalty scored) Chambers; (penalty scored) Nanco; (penalty scored) Holness; (penalty scored) Moar; (penalty scored) Skundrich; (penalty scored) Mahoney; (penalty scored) Real; (penalty scored) Mbaizo |

| October 27, 2018 Semifinal | Louisville City FC | 2–0 | Bethlehem Steel FC | Louisville, Kentucky |
| 7:30 PM EDT | Ownby 34', 59' (yellow card) 79'; Smith (yellow card) 64' | Report | Moar (yellow card) 57'; Mbaizo (yellow card) 83'; Ofeimu (yellow card) 86' | Stadium: Louisville Slugger Field; Attendance: 6,881 |

== Statistics ==
As of February 9, 2019

| No. | Pos | Nat | Player | Total | | USL | | USL Playoffs | |
| No. | Pos | Nat | Player | Apps | Goals | Apps | Goals | Apps | Goals |
|---|---|---|---|---|---|---|---|---|---|
Defenders:
| 3 | DF | (United States) USA | Jack Elliot | 1 | 0 | 1 | 0 | 0 | 0 |
| 4 | DF | (United States) USA | Mark McKenzie | 2 | 0 | 2 | 0 | 0 | 0 |
| 15 | DF | (Ghana) GHA | Josh Yaro | 6 | 0 | 6 | 0 | 0 | 0 |
| 16 | DF | (United States) USA | Richie Marquez | 4 | 0 | 4 | 0 | 0 | 0 |
| 32 | DF | (United States) USA | Matthew Real | 21 | 1 | 20 | 1 | 1 | 0 |
| 43 | DF | (Zambia) ZAM | Prosper Chiluya* | 16 | 1 | 14+2 | 1 | 0 | 0 |
| 44 | DF | (United States) USA | Brandon Aubrey | 28 | 0 | 26+1 | 0 | 1 | 0 |
| 47 | DF | (Cameroon) CMR | Olivier Mbaizo | 24 | 0 | 22 | 0 | 2 | 0 |
| 48 | DF | (United States) USA | Matt Mahoney | 35 | 2 | 31+2 | 2 | 2 | 0 |
| 53 | DF | (United States) USA | Ben Ofeimu‡ | 12 | 1 | 7+3 | 1 | 2 | 0 |
Midfielders:
| 8 | MF | (United States) USA | Derrick Jones | 14 | 4 | 14 | 4 | 0 | 0 |
| 14 | MF | (Germany) GER | Fabian Herbers | 14 | 5 | 14 | 5 | 0 | 0 |
| 20 | MF | (United States) USA | Marcus Epps | 1 | 0 | 1 | 0 | 0 | 0 |
| 21 | MF | (United States) USA | Anthony Fontana | 16 | 1 | 15 | 1 | 1 | 0 |
| 24 | MF | (United States) USA | Adam Najem | 15 | 3 | 15 | 3 | 0 | 0 |
| 30 | MF | (Cameroon) CMR | Eric Ayuk | 4 | 1 | 3+1 | 1 | 0 | 0 |
| 36 | MF | (Jamaica) JAM | Omar Holness | 11 | 2 | 2+7 | 2 | 0+2 | 0 |
| 39 | MF | (United States) USA | Drew Skundrich | 28 | 2 | 14+12 | 2 | 1+1 | 0 |
| 41 | MF | (United States) USA | Mike Catalano | 10 | 0 | 2+8 | 0 | 0 | 0 |
| 45 | MF | (Republic of Ireland) IRL | James Chambers | 29 | 5 | 27 | 4 | 2 | 1 |
| 49 | MF | (United States) USA | A. J. Paterson | 1 | 0 | 1 | 0 | 0 | 0 |
| 63 | MF | (United States) USA | Brenden Aaronson‡ | 18 | 1 | 11+5 | 1 | 2 | 0 |
Forwards:
| 19 | FW | (Jamaica) JAM | Cory Burke | 4 | 2 | 4 | 2 | 0 | 0 |
| 20 | FW | (United States) USA | Marcus Epps | 12 | 2 | 12 | 2 | 0 | 0 |
| 35 | FW | (Cameroon) CMR | Faris Pemi Moumbagna | 15 | 3 | 9+4 | 3 | 2 | 0 |
| 37 | FW | (Canada) CAN | Chris Nanco | 32 | 5 | 10+20 | 5 | 1+1 | 0 |
| 38 | FW | (Spain) ESP | Santi Moar | 35 | 6 | 24+9 | 6 | 2 | 0 |
| 40 | FW | (United States) USA | Brandon Allen | 7 | 2 | 4+3 | 2 | 0 | 0 |
| 42 | FW | (United States) USA | Aidan Apodaca | 17 | 2 | 7+9 | 2 | 0+1 | 0 |
| 46 | FW | (Democratic Republic of the Congo) COD | Michee Ngalina | 24 | 7 | 17+6 | 6 | 1 | 1 |
| 50 | FW | (United States) USA | Tonny Temple‡ | 7 | 0 | 2+5 | 0 | 0 | 0 |
| 52 | FW | (United States) USA | Issa Rayyan‡ | 1 | 0 | 0+1 | 0 | 0 | 0 |
| 59 | FW | (United States) USA | Jeremy Rafanello‡ | 2 | 0 | 0+2 | 0 | 0 | 0 |

Players with names in italics were on loan from Philadelphia Union for individual matches with Bethlehem.
Players with names marked ‡ were academy call-ups from Philadelphia Union Academy for individual matches with Bethlehem.
Players with names marked * were on loan from another club for the whole of their season with Bethlehem.

=== Goalkeepers ===
As of February 9, 2019.

Players included in matchday squads
| Nat. | No. | Player | Apps | Starts | Record | GA | GAA | SO | Yellow card | Red card |
|---|---|---|---|---|---|---|---|---|---|---|
| (United States) | 23 | John McCarthy | 12 | 12 | 5–2–5 | 14 | 1.17 | 5 | 0 | 0 |
| (United States) | 29 | Jake McGuire | 21 | 21 | 9–10–2 | 26 | 1.24 | 3 | 0 | 0 |
| (United States) | 64 | Tomas Romero‡ | 1 | 1 | 0–0–1 | 1 | 1.00 | 0 | 0 | 0 |
| Total | | | | | 14–12–8 | 41 | 1.21 | 8 | 0 | 0 |

== Honors ==
=== Team of the Week ===
- Week 1 Team of the Week: F Brandon Allen
- Week 5 Team of the Week Bench: M Derrick Jones
- Week 8 Team of the Week: M Santi Moar
- Week 10 Team of the Week: M Fabian Herbers, Bench M Adam Najem
- Week 12 Team of the Week: M Santi Moar
- Week 13 Team of the Week: D Matthew Real
- Week 14 Team of the Week: M Derrick Jones
- Week 15 Team of the Week: M Chris Nanco
- Week 16 Team of the Week: M Drew Skundrich
- Week 17 Team of the Week Bench: M Fabian Herbers
- Week 20 Team of the Week: M Brenden Aaronson
- Week 21 Team of the Week: D Olivier Mbaizo
- Week 22 Team of the Week: G Jake McGuire
- Week 24 Team of the Week: D Matthew Mahoney, M Santi Moar

=== USL Coach of the Month ===
August: Brendan Burke
