= 2018 Philadelphia Union season =

Philadelphia Union
2018 season
- Owner: Keystone Sports & Entertainment
- Head coach: Jim Curtin
- Stadium: Talen Energy Stadium (Capacity: 18,500)
- MLS: Conference: 6th Overall: 11th
- MLS Cup Playoffs: Knockout round
- U.S. Open Cup: Runners-up
- Top goalscorer: League: 2 players tied (5); All: Cory Burke (6)
- Highest home attendance: 19,013; July 21 vs LA Galaxy
- Lowest home attendance: League: 14,795; April 7 vs San Jose Earthquakes; All: 3,565; June 5 vs Richmond Kickers
- Average home league attendance: 16,518
Home colors	Away colors

The 2018 Philadelphia Union season was the club's ninth season in Major League Soccer, the top flight of American soccer. The team was managed by Jim Curtin, his fifth season with the club. The Union reached the MLS Cup Playoffs as the bottom seed in the MLS Eastern Conference. The club also reached the 2018 U.S. Open Cup final for the third time in club history, but finished runners-up to Houston Dynamo. The 2018 season was the Union's most successful to date, earning the highest points total (50) and most wins (15). Additionally, the 2018 season transitioned Sporting Directors with Earnie Stewart accepting a general manager position with the United States Soccer Federation, and the Union hiring Ernst Tanner; former academy manager for Red Bull Salzburg.

== Background ==
=== MLS SuperDraft ===
The Union selected three players from the third and fourth rounds of the 2018 SuperDraft

Round	Pick	Name	Position	Nationality	School
3	54	Mike Catalano	Midfielder	United States	Wisconsin
3	55	Aidan Apodaca	Forward	United States	California Baptist University
4	77	Matt Danilack	Forward	United States	Dartmouth

== Personnel ==
=== Roster ===
No.	Name	Nationality	Position	Date of birth (age)	Signed from
Goalkeepers
1	John McCarthy	(United States)	GK	July 4, 1992 (age 34)	(United States) Rochester Rhinos
18	Andre Blake (INT)	(Jamaica)	GK	November 21, 1990 (age 35)	(United States) UConn
29	Jake McGuire	(United States)	GK	September 3, 1994 (age 32)	(United States) University of Tulsa
Defenders
3	Jack Elliott (INT)	(Scotland)	CB	August 24, 1995 (age 31)	(United States) West Virginia University
4	Mark McKenzie (HGP)	(United States)	CB	August 12, 1998 (age 28)	(United States) Bethlehem Steel FC
5	Olivier Mbaizo	(Cameroon)	DF	August 15, 1997 (age 29)	(United States) Bethlehem Steel FC
12	Keegan Rosenberry	(United States)	RB	December 11, 1993 (age 32)	(United States) Georgetown University
15	Joshua Yaro (GA)	(Ghana)	LB/CB	March 7, 1994 (age 32)	(United States) Georgetown University
16	Richie Marquez	(United States)	CB	May 26, 1992 (age 34)	(United States) University of Redlands
26	Auston Trusty (HGP)	(United States)	CB	August 12, 1998 (age 28)	(United States) Bethlehem Steel FC
28	Ray Gaddis	(United States)	RB	January 13, 1990 (age 36)	(United States) West Virginia University
32	Matthew Real (HGP)	(United States)	LB	July 10, 1999 (age 27)	(United States) Bethlehem Steel FC
33	Fabinho	(Brazil)	LB	March 16, 1985 (age 41)	(Australia) Sydney FC
Midfielders
2	Warren Creavalle	(Guyana)	DM	August 14, 1990 (age 36)	(Canada) Toronto FC
6	Haris Medunjanin (INT)	(Bosnia and Herzegovina)	CM	March 8, 1985 (age 41)	(Israel) Maccabi Tel Aviv
7	David Accam	(Ghana)	MF	September 28, 1990 (age 36)	(United States) Chicago Fire
8	Derrick Jones (HGP)	(United States)	MF	March 3, 1997 (age 29)	(United States) Bethlehem Steel FC
9	Fafà Picault	(United States)	MF	February 23, 1991 (age 35)	(Germany) FC St. Pauli
10	Bořek Dočkal (DP) (INT)	(Czech Republic)	ACM	September 30, 1988 (age 38)	(China) Henan Jianye
11	Alejandro Bedoya (DP)	(United States)	CM/RM	April 29, 1987 (age 39)	(France) FC Nantes
14	Fabian Herbers	(Germany)	CF	August 17, 1993 (age 33)	(United States) Creighton University
20	Marcus Epps	(United States)	CF	January 16, 1995 (age 31)	(United States) South Florida
21	Anthony Fontana (HGP)	(United States)	MF	October 14, 1999 (age 27)	(United States) Bethlehem Steel FC
24	Adam Najem	(Afghanistan)	MF	January 19, 1995 (age 31)	(United States) Akron
25	Ilsinho (INT)	(Brazil)	CM/RM	October 12, 1985 (age 41)	(Ukraine) Shakhtar Donetsk
Forwards
17	C.J. Sapong	(United States)	CF	December 27, 1988 (age 37)	(United States) Sporting Kansas City
19	Cory Burke (INT)	(Jamaica)	CF	December 28, 1991 (age 34)	(United States) Bethlehem Steel FC
27	Jay Simpson (INT)	(England)	CF	December 1, 1988 (age 37)	(England) Leyton Orient

Last updated: May 30, 2018.
Source: Philadelphia Union Roster

Last updated: May 30, 2018.
Source: MLS Designations

DP indicates Designated Player
GA indicates Generation Adidas Player
HGP indicates Home Grown Player
INT indicates MLS International Player and qualifies for an international roster spot

=== Staff ===
As of February 4, 2018

Position	Staff	Nationality
Head coach	Jim Curtin	United States
Technical director and assistant coach	Chris Albright	United States
Assistant coach	B.J. Callaghan	United States
Assistant coach	Pat Noonan	United States
Goalkeeping coach	Tim Hanley	United States
Head athletic trainer	Paul Rushing	United States
Team coordinator	Josh Gros	United States
Sporting director	Earnie Stewart	United States
Academy director	Tommy Wilson	Scotland

== Competitions ==
=== Preseason ===
February 3, 2018 Preseason	Philadelphia Union	3–4	New York Red Bulls	Clearwater, Florida
10:00 a.m. EST	Sapong 63' (pen.); 116'; Aaronson 125'	Report	Entienne 81'; Muyl 95'; Moreno 119'; Mines 131'	Stadium: Joe DiMaggio Sports Complex; Attendance: Closed-door
Note: Three 45-minute periods.

February 6, 2018 Preseason	University of South Florida	1–5	Philadelphia Union	Clearwater, Florida
7:00 p.m. EST	(yellow card) 23'; 45'	Report	Sapong 3'; Herbers 44'; Epps 67'; Burke 70', 82'	Stadium: Joe DiMaggio Sports Complex

February 8, 2018 Preseason	Philadelphia Union	0–0	Chicago Fire	Clearwater, Florida
11:00 a.m. EST				Stadium: Joe DiMaggio Sports Complex

February 14, 2018 Preseason	Orlando City SC	3–1	Philadelphia Union	Sanford, Florida
12:00 p.m. EST	18' (pen.); 135'; 137'		Burke 144'	Stadium: Sylvan Lake Park
Note: Two 75-minute sessions.

February 17, 2018 Suncoast Invitational	Philadelphia Union	1–2	D.C. United	St. Petersburg, Florida
5:00 p.m. EST	Fabinho (yellow card) 16'; Burke 88'	Report	Mattocks 14'; Acosta 89'	Stadium: Al Lang Stadium

February 21, 2018 Suncoast Invitational	Philadelphia Union	5–0	Montreal Impact	Clearwater, Florida
7:30 p.m. EST	Sapong 13' (pen.), 49'; Accam 41', (yellow card) 45'; Trusty 54'; Simpson 77'	Report	Donadel (yellow card) 45'	Stadium: Joe DiMaggio Sports Complex

February 24, 2018 Suncoast Invitational	Tampa Bay Rowdies	2–1	Philadelphia Union	St. Petersburg, Florida
7:00 p.m. EST	Graf 19'; Nanchoff 35'; Blake (yellow card) 36'	Report	Creavalle (yellow card) 21'; Medunjanin 84'	Stadium: Al Lang Stadium; Referee: Ted Unkel

=== MLS season ===
March 3, 2018 1	Philadelphia Union	2–0	New England Revolution	Chester, Pennsylvania
7:00 p.m. EST	Fontana 43'; Sapong (yellow card) 63', (goal) 69'	Report; Box Score	Delamea (red card) 24'; Farrell (yellow card) 59'; Dielna (yellow card) 36' (yellow-red card) 86'; Zahibo (yellow card) 90+1'	Stadium: Talen Energy Stadium; Attendance: 16,452; Referee: Rubiel Vazquez

March 17, 2018 2	Philadelphia Union	0–0	Columbus Crew SC	Chester, Pennsylvania
2:00 p.m. EDT	Bedoya (yellow card) 76'; Rosenberry (yellow card) 88'	Report; Box Score	Artur (yellow card) 53'; Higuaín (yellow card) 78'	Stadium: Talen Energy Stadium; Attendance: 15,323; Referee: Nima Saghafi

March 31, 2018 3	Colorado Rapids	3–0	Philadelphia Union	Commerce City, Colorado
9:00 p.m. EDT	Price (yellow card) 48'; Badji 53', 61', 87'; Blomberg (yellow card) 63'; Serna (yellow card) 69'	Report; Box Score		Stadium: Dick's Sporting Goods Park; Attendance: 10,790; Referee: Robert Sibiga

April 7, 2018 4	Philadelphia Union	1–1	San Jose Earthquakes	Chester, Pennsylvania
7:00 p.m. EDT	Accam (yellow card) 23'; Bedoya 64'	Report; Box Score	Eriksson 37'; Quintana (yellow card) 56'; Wondolowski (yellow card) 82'; Cummings (red card) 90+6'	Stadium: Talen Energy Stadium; Attendance: 14,795; Referee: Dave Gantar

April 13, 2018 5	Philadelphia Union	0–2	Orlando City SC	Chester, Pennsylvania
8:00 p.m. EDT	Real (yellow card) 67'; Rosenberry (yellow card) 81'	Report; Box Score	Dwyer 38', (yellow card) 74'; Mueller 45'; Bendik (yellow card) 63'; Yotún (yellow card) 79'; El Monir (yellow card) 79'	Stadium: Talen Energy Stadium; Attendance: 16,032; Referee: Chris Penso

April 21, 2018 6	FC Dallas	2–0	Philadelphia Union	Frisco, Texas
8:00 p.m. EDT	Hayes (yellow card) 17'; Díaz 64' (pen.); Urruti 74'	Report; Box Score	Medunjanin (yellow card) 90+2'	Stadium: Toyota Stadium; Attendance: 13,326; Referee: Alan Kelly

April 28, 2018 7	Philadelphia Union	3–2	D.C. United	Chester, Pennsylvania
3:30 p.m. EDT	Ilsinho 37'; Trusty (yellow card) 44'; Sapong 60'; Elliott (yellow card) 66'; Dočkal 72'	Report; Box Score	Stieber 7'; Asad (yellow card) 25'; Mattocks 70'	Stadium: Talen Energy Stadium; Attendance: 16,493; Referee: Armando Villarreal

May 4, 2018 8	Toronto FC	3–0	Philadelphia Union	Toronto, Ontario
8:00 p.m. EDT	Vázquez 28'; Giovinco (yellow card) 31', (goal) 65'; Morgan (yellow card) 45+2'; Chapman 89'	Report; Box Score	Elliott (yellow card) 24'; Trusty (yellow card) 50'; Ilsinho (yellow card) 84'	Stadium: BMO Field; Attendance: 24,728; Referee: Jose Carlos Rivero

May 9, 2018 9	Columbus Crew SC	1–0	Philadelphia Union	Columbus, Ohio
7:30 p.m. EDT	Jonathan (yellow card) 27'; Zardes 53'	Report; Box Score	Elliott (yellow card) 77'	Stadium: MAPFRE Stadium; Attendance: 7,683; Referee: Mark Geiger

May 12, 2018 10	Montreal Impact	0–2	Philadelphia Union	Montreal, Quebec
3:00 p.m. EDT	Silva (yellow card) 65'; Lovitz (red card) 67'; Piette (yellow card) 77'	Report; Box Score	Burke 58', (red card) 58'; McKenzie (yellow card) 71'; Medunjanin 88'	Stadium: Stade Saputo; Attendance: 17,140; Referee: Kevin Stott

May 19, 2018 11	Philadelphia Union	4–1	Real Salt Lake	Chester, Pennsylvania
7:30 p.m. EDT	Epps 21'; Dočkal 34'; Ilsinho 74'; Rosenberry 81'	Report; Box Score	Kreilach 65'; Ruíz (yellow card) 87'	Stadium: Talen Energy Stadium; Attendance: 16,019; Referee: Chico Grajeda

May 26, 2018 12	New York Red Bulls	0–0	Philadelphia Union	Harrison, New Jersey
7:00 p.m. EDT	Wright-Phillips (yellow card) 64'	Report; Boxscore	McKenzie (yellow card) 27'; Picault (yellow card) 69'; Medunjanin (yellow card) 79'	Stadium: Red Bull Arena; Attendance: 17,814; Referee: Ted Unkel

May 30, 2018 13	Philadelphia Union	3–1	Chicago Fire SC	Chester, Pennsylvania
7:30 p.m. EDT	Ilsinho 44'; Burke 51'; Dočkal 87' (pen.)	Report; Box Score	Corrales (yellow card) 32'; Gordon 56'	Stadium: Talen Energy Stadium; Attendance: 14,805; Referee: Fotis Bazakos

June 2, 2018 14	Atlanta United FC	3–1	Philadelphia Union	Atlanta, Georgia
7:00 p.m. EDT	Martínez 21' (pen.), 49', 83' (pen.)	Report; Box Score	Bedoya (yellow card) 11' (yellow-red card) 19'; Medunjanin (yellow card) 19' (yellow-red card) 19'; Picault (yellow card) 28', (goal) 52'	Stadium: Mercedes-Benz Stadium; Attendance: 45,140; Referee: Sorin Stoica

June 8, 2018 15	Philadelphia Union	0–2	Toronto FC	Chester, Pennsylvania
8:00 p.m. EDT	Creavalle (yellow card) 16'; Gaddis (yellow card) 47'	Report; Box Score	Osorio 19', 79'; Chapman (yellow card) 37'	Stadium: Talen Energy Stadium; Attendance: 16,493; Referee: Baldomero Toledo

June 23, 2018 16	Philadelphia Union	4–0	Vancouver Whitecaps FC	Chester, Pennsylvania
5:00 p.m. EDT	Dočkal 23', 71'; Picault (yellow card) 31', (goal) 90+5' (pen.); Ilsinho 74' (pen.)	Recap; Box Score	Aja (red card) 72'; Reyna (yellow card) 82' (yellow-red card) 90+4'; Blondell (yellow card) 83'	Stadium: Talen Energy Stadium; Attendance: 15,250; Referee: Allen Chapman

June 30, 2018 17	Los Angeles FC	4–1	Philadelphia Union	Los Angeles, California
10:30 p.m. EDT	Diomande 25', 43', 55'; Beitashour (yellow card) 39'; Nguyen (yellow card) 85'; Blessing 90+6'	Report; Box Score	Picault 45'	Stadium: Banc of California Stadium; Attendance: 22,000; Referee: Robert Sibiga

July 7, 2018 18	Philadelphia Union	0–2	Atlanta United FC	Chester, Pennsylvania
7:00 p.m. EDT	McKenzie (yellow card) 21'; Blake (yellow card) 57'	Report; Box Score	Parkhurst (yellow card) 19'; Martínez 58' (pen.); Villalba 76'	Stadium: Talen Energy Stadium; Attendance: 17,025; Referee: Ismail Elfath

July 11, 2018 19	Chicago Fire SC	3–4	Philadelphia Union	Bridgeview, Illinois
8:30 p.m. EDT	Corrales (yellow card) 5'; Nikolić 31' (pen.); Katai 69'; Kappelhof (yellow card) 83'; Schweinsteiger 90+4'	Report; Box Score	Burke (yellow card) 7', (goal) 45+3', 73'; Medunjanin 31'; Accam 90+5', (yellow card) 90+6'	Stadium: Toyota Park; Attendance: 12,008; Referee: Dave Gantar

July 21, 2018 20	Philadelphia Union	1–3	LA Galaxy	Chester, Pennsylvania
7:00 p.m. EDT	Sapong 29'; Picault (yellow card) 31'; Medunjanin (yellow card) 79'	Report; Box Score	Kamara 48'; Ibrahimović 63'; Ciani (yellow card) 64', (goal) 82'; Alessandrini (yellow card) 80'	Stadium: Talen Energy Stadium; Attendance: 19,013; Referee: Nima Saghafi

July 25, 2018 21	Houston Dynamo	1–3	Philadelphia Union	Houston, Texas
9:00 p.m. EDT	Manotas 10'; Martinez (red card) 59'; Cerén (yellow card) 90+2'; Fuenmayor (yellow card) 90+5'	Report; Box Score	Bedoya 34'; Rosenberry (yellow card) 45+1'; McKenzie (yellow card) 53'; Sapong (yellow card) 65'; Burke 70'; Picault 90+6'	Stadium: BBVA Compass Stadium; Attendance: 13,094; Referee: Joseph Dickerson

August 4, 2018 22	Portland Timbers	3–0	Philadelphia Union	Portland, Oregon
11:00 p.m. EDT	Valeri 58' (pen.); Asprilla 84' (pen.); Guzmán 87'	Report; Box Score	Bedoya (yellow card) 90'	Stadium: Providence Park; Attendance: 21,144; Referee: Alan Kelly

August 11, 2018 23	New England Revolution	2–3	Philadelphia Union	Foxborough, Massachusetts
7:30 p.m. EDT	Farrell 46'; Zahibo 64'; Delamea (yellow card) 75'; Rowe (yellow card) 90+3'	Report; Box Score	Elliott 14', 24'; Blake (yellow card) 57'; Picault (yellow card) 63', (goal) 76' (pen.)	Stadium: Gillette Stadium; Attendance: 19,516; Referee: Allen Chapman

August 18, 2018 24	Philadelphia Union	2–0	New York City FC	Chester, Pennsylvania
7:00 p.m. EDT	Burke 57'; Ilsinho 76'; Creavalle (yellow card) 90'	Report; Box Score	Tinnerholm (yellow card) 32'; Matarrita (red card) 90+5'	Stadium: Talen Energy Stadium; Attendance: 17,594; Referee: Fotis Bazakos

August 25, 2018 25	Philadelphia Union	1–0	New England Revolution	Chester, Pennsylvania
7:00 p.m. EDT	Burke 53', (yellow card) 56'	Report; Box Score	Mancienne (yellow card) 78'; Fagundez (yellow card) 90+4'	Stadium: Talen Energy Stadium; Attendance: 18,052; Referee: Drew Fischer

August 29, 2018 26	D.C. United	0–2	Philadelphia Union	Washington, D.C.
7:30 p.m. EDT	Birnbaum (yellow card) 90+2'	Report; Box Score	Elliott (yellow card) 27'; Sapong 29'; Dočkal (yellow card) 57'; Picault 61'	Stadium: Audi Field; Attendance: 17,692; Referee: Nima Saghafi

September 1, 2018 27	Orlando City SC	2–2	Philadelphia Union	Orlando, Florida
7:30 p.m. EDT	Dwyer 9'; Sutter 90+1'	Report	Burke 32'; Picault 88'; Bedoya (yellow card) 89'; Jones (yellow card) 90+5'	Stadium: Orlando City Stadium; Attendance: 22,912; Referee: Chris Penso

September 15, 2018 28	Philadelphia Union	1–4	Montreal Impact	Chester, Pennsylvania
7:30 p.m. EDT	Trusty 11'; Elliott (yellow card) 42'; Burke (yellow card) 56'	Report; Box Score	Silva (yellow card) 21', (goal) 28', 76'; Taïder 39'; Amarikwa 63'	Stadium: Talen Energy Stadium; Attendance: 18,024; Referee: Armando Villarreal

September 19, 2018 29	Seattle Sounders FC	0–1	Philadelphia Union	Seattle, Washington
11:00 p.m. EDT		Report; Box Score	Jones (yellow card) 52'; Elliott (yellow card) 78' (yellow-red card) 89'; Picault 90+3'	Stadium: CenturyLink Field; Attendance: 39,536; Referee: Ismail Elfath

September 23, 2018 30	Philadelphia Union	2–0	Sporting Kansas City	Chester, Pennsylvania
1:00 p.m. EDT	Accam (yellow card) 66'; Simpson 71', 89'; Mbaizo (yellow card) 75'	Report; Box Score	Espinoza (yellow card) 65'	Stadium: Talen Energy Stadium; Attendance: 15,080; Referee: Mark Geiger

September 29, 2018 31	Columbus Crew SC	0–0	Philadelphia Union	Columbus, Ohio
7:30 p.m. EDT		Report; Box Score	Fabinho (yellow card) 85'; Bedoya (yellow card) 88'	Stadium: MAPFRE Stadium; Attendance: 12,441; Referee: Drew Fischer

October 6, 2018 32	Philadelphia Union	5–1	Minnesota United FC	Chester, Pennsylvania
7:30 p.m. EDT	Burke 8'; Bedoya 17', (yellow card) 56'; Picault 23', 44', (yellow card) 72'; Ilsinho 79'	Report; Box Score	Quintero 54'; Gómez (yellow card) 72'; Bob (yellow card) 75'	Stadium: Talen Energy Stadium; Attendance: 16,334; Referee: Allen Chapman

October 21, 2018 33	Philadelphia Union	0–1	New York Red Bulls	Chester, Pennsylvania
3:00 p.m. EDT	Sapong (yellow card) 37'; Trusty (yellow card) 47'; Picault (yellow card) 66'	Report; Box Score	Adams (yellow card) 55'; Muyl (yellow card) 57'; Romero Gamarra 69' (pen.)	Stadium: Talen Energy Stadium; Attendance: 18,021; Referee: Ted Unkel

October 28, 2018 34	New York City FC	3–1	Philadelphia Union	New York, New York
4:30 p.m. EDT	Chanot 8'; Trusty 10' (o.g.); Villa 34'	Report; Box Score	Burke 14', (yellow card) 40'; Trusty (yellow card) 16'; Medunjanin (yellow card) 67'	Stadium: Yankee Stadium; Attendance: 24,441; Referee: Alan Kelly

=== MLS Cup Playoffs ===
October 31, 2018 Knockout round	New York City FC	3–1	Philadelphia Union	New York, New York
7:00 p.m. EDT	Tajouri 10'; Villa 26'; Chanot (yellow card) 55'; Sweat (yellow card) 71'; Moralez 78'	Report; Box Score	McKenzie (yellow card) 24'; Medunjanin (yellow card) 73'; Burke 83'; Jones (yellow card) 86'	Stadium: Yankee Stadium; Attendance: 15,153; Referee: Robert Sibiga

=== U.S. Open Cup ===
June 5, 2018 Fourth round	Philadelphia Union	5–0	Richmond Kickers	Chester, Pennsylvania
7:00 p.m. EDT	Elliott 3'; Accam 27' (pen.); Fontana 44'; Epps 45+2'; Simpson 49'; Rosenberry (yellow card) 88'	Report; Box Score		Stadium: Talen Energy Stadium; Attendance: 3,565; Referee: Lorent Varga

June 16, 2018 Round of 16	Philadelphia Union	2–1	New York Red Bulls	Chester, Pennsylvania
7:00 p.m. EDT	Medunjanin 52'; Burke 61'	Report; Box Score	Wright-Phillips 77'	Stadium: Talen Energy Stadium; Attendance: 4,009; Referee: Jon Freemon

July 18, 2018 Quarterfinals	Philadelphia Union	1–0	Orlando City SC	Chester, Pennsylvania
7:00 p.m. EDT	Bedoya 4'	Report; Box Score	Toia (yellow card) 85'; Johnson (yellow card) 90+1'	Stadium: Talen Energy Stadium; Attendance: 7,176; Referee: Rubiel Vazquez

August 8, 2018 Semifinals	Philadelphia Union	3–0	Chicago Fire	Chester, Pennsylvania
7:00 p.m. EDT	Burke 59', 77'; Sapong 86'	Report; Box Score	Katai (yellow card) 62'	Stadium: Talen Energy Stadium; Attendance: 7,934; Referee: Ramy Touchan

September 26, 2018 Final	Houston Dynamo	3–0	Philadelphia Union	Houston, Texas
7:00 p.m. EDT	Manotas 4' (Elis), 25', (yellow card) 61'; Martínez (yellow card) 53'; Trusty 65' (o.g.); O. García (yellow card) 69'	Report; Box Score	Dočkal (yellow card) 51'	Stadium: BBVA Compass Stadium; Attendance: 16,060; Referee: Nima Saghafi; Assistant referees: Cameron Blanchard; Kyle Atkins; Fourth official: Alejandro Mariscal

=== Friendlies ===
July 14, 2018 Friendly	Philadelphia Union	1–0	Eintracht Frankfurt	Chester, Pennsylvania
7:00 p.m. EST	Fabinho (yellow card) 32'; Jones 49'; Burke (yellow card) 83'	Report; Box Score	Allan (yellow card) 45+'; Falette (yellow card) 83'	Stadium: Talen Energy Stadium; Attendance: 13,954; Referee: Guido Gonzales

== Standings ==
=== Eastern Conference ===
Pos	Team	Pld	W	L	T	GF	GA	GD	Pts	Qualification
1	New York Red Bulls	34	22	7	5	62	33	+29	71	Qualification for the conference semifinals
2	Atlanta United FC	34	21	7	6	70	44	+26	69	Qualification for the conference semifinals
3	New York City FC	34	16	10	8	59	45	+14	56	Qualification for the knockout round
4	D.C. United	34	14	11	9	60	50	+10	51	Qualification for the knockout round
5	Columbus Crew	34	14	11	9	43	45	−2	51	Qualification for the knockout round
6	Philadelphia Union	34	15	14	5	49	50	−1	50	Qualification for the knockout round
7	Montreal Impact	34	14	16	4	47	53	−6	46	
8	New England Revolution	34	10	13	11	49	55	−6	41	
9	Toronto FC	34	10	18	6	59	64	−5	36	
10	Chicago Fire	34	8	18	8	48	61	−13	32	
11	Orlando City SC	34	8	22	4	43	74	−31	28	

Source: MLS

=== League standings ===
Pos	Team	Pld	W	L	T	GF	GA	GD	Pts
8	Portland Timbers	34	15	10	9	54	48	+6	54
9	D.C. United	34	14	11	9	60	50	+10	51
10	Columbus Crew	34	14	11	9	43	45	−2	51
11	Philadelphia Union	34	15	14	5	49	50	−1	50
12	Real Salt Lake	34	14	13	7	55	58	−3	49
13	LA Galaxy	34	13	12	9	66	64	+2	48
14	Vancouver Whitecaps FC	34	13	13	8	54	67	−13	47

Source: MLS
Rules for classification: 1) points; 2) total wins; 3) total goal differential; 4) total goals scored; 5) disciplinary points; 6) away goals scored; 7) away goal differential; 8) coin toss or drawing of lots

=== Results summary ===
Overall								Home						Away					
Pld	W	D	L	GF	GA	GD	Pts	W	D	L	GF	GA	GD	W	D	L	GF	GA	GD
21	8	3	10	29	34	−5	27	5	2	4	18	14	+4	3	1	6	11	20	−9

Last updated: July 31, 2018.
Source: MLS

Round	1	2	3	4	5	6	7	8	9	10	11	12	13	14	15	16	17	18	19	20	21	22	23	24	25	26	27	28	29	30	31	32	33	34
Stadium	H	H	A	H	H	A	H	A	A	A	H	A	H	A	H	H	A	H	A	H	A	A	A	H	H	A	A	H	A	H	A	H	H	A
Result	W	T	L	T	L	L	W	L	L	W	W	T	W	L	L	W	L	L	W	L	W	L	W	W	W	W	T	L	W	W	T	W	L	L

Updated to match(es) played on July 31, 2018. Source: 2018 MLS season & Weekly MLS Standing
A = Away; H = Home; W = Win; L = Loss; T = Tie

Position references Eastern Conference standings.

== Statistics ==
=== Appearances and goals ===
As of May 31, 2018

No.	Pos	Nat	Player	Total		MLS		MLS Cup		U.S. Open Cup	
No.	Pos	Nat	Player	Apps	Goals	Apps	Goals	Apps	Goals	Apps	Goals
Defenders
3	DF	(England) ENG	Jack Elliot	8	0	8	0	0	0	0	0
4	DF	(United States) USA	Mark McKenzie	7	0	6+1	0	0	0	0	0
5	DF	(United States) USA	Olivier Mbaizo	0	0	0	0	0	0	0	0
12	DF	(United States) USA	Keegan Rosenberry	14	1	14	1	0	0	0	0
15	DF	(Ghana) GHA	Joshua Yaro	0	0	0	0	0	0	0	0
16	DF	(United States) USA	Richie Marquez	0	0	0	0	0	0	0	0
26	DF	(United States) USA	Auston Trusty	14	0	14	0	0	0	0	0
28	DF	(United States) USA	Ray Gaddis	11	0	8+3	0	0	0	0	0
32	DF	(United States) USA	Matthew Real	3	0	3	0	0	0	0	0
33	DF	(Brazil) BRA	Fabinho	4	0	3+1	0	0	0	0	0
Midfielders
2	MF	(Guyana) GUY	Warren Creavalle	2	0	0+2	0	0	0	0	0
4	MF	(Bosnia and Herzegovina) BIH	Haris Medunjanin	14	1	14	1	0	0	0	0
7	MF	(Ghana) GHA	David Accam	14	0	11+3	0	0	0	0	0
8	MF	(United States) USA	Derrick Jones	1	0	0+1	0	0	0	0	0
9	MF	(United States) USA	Fafa Picault	9	0	6+3	0	0	0	0	0
10	MF	(Czech Republic) CZE	Bořek Dočkal	13	3	13	3	0	0	0	0
11	MF	(United States) USA	Alejandro Bedoya	14	1	14	1	0	0	0	0
14	MF	(Germany) GER	Fabian Herbers	3	0	3	0	0	0	0	0
20	MF	(United States) USA	Marcus Epps	6	1	3+3	1	0	0	0	0
21	MF	(United States) USA	Anthony Fontana	4	1	1+3	1	0	0	0	0
24	MF	(United States) USA	Adam Najem	0	0	0	0	0	0	0	0
25	MF	(Brazil) BRA	Ilsinho	11	3	5+6	3	0	0	0	0
30	MF	(Cameroon) CMR	Eric Ayuk Mbu	0	0	0	0	0	0	0	0
Forwards
17	FW	(United States) USA	C.J. Sapong	12	2	11+1	2	0	0	0	0
19	FW	(Jamaica) JAM	Cory Burke	11	2	3+8	2	0	0	0	0
27	FW	(England) ENG	Jay Simpson	2	0	0+2	0	0	0	0	0

Statistics are from all matches as documented by Soccerway.com.

=== Top scorers ===
As of May 31, 2018

Place	Position	Name	MLS	MLS Cup	Open Cup	Total
1	MF	(Brazil) Ilsinho	3	0	0	3
1	MF	(Czech Republic) Bořek Dočkal	3	0	0	3
2	FW	(United States) C.J. Sapong	2	0	0	2
2	FW	(Jamaica) Cory Burke	2	0	0	2
3	DF	(United States) Keegan Rosenberry	1	0	0	1
3	MF	(Bosnia and Herzegovina) Haris Medunjanin	1	0	0	1
3	MF	(United States) Alejandro Bedoya	1	0	0	1
3	MF	(United States) Marcus Epps	1	0	0	1
3	MF	(United States) Anthony Fontana	1	0	0	1
Total			15	0	0	15

=== Goalkeepers ===
As of May 31, 2018

Nat.	No.	Player	Apps	Starts	Record	GA	GAA	SO	Yellow card	Red card
(Jamaica)	1	Andre Blake	14	14	5–5–3	16	1.07	4	0	0
(United States)	27	John McCarthy	0	0	0–0–0	0	0.00	0	0	0
(United States)	29	Jake McGuire	0	0	0–0–0	0	0.00	0	0	0
Total					5-5-3	15	1.07	4	0	0

Record = W-L-D

== Transfers ==
=== In ===
Date	No.	Pos.	Player	Transferred from	Fee/notes	Source
December 20, 2017	14	MF	(Germany) Fabian Herbers	(United States) Philadelphia Union	Signed new contract	
December 20, 2017	25	MF	(Brazil) Ilsinho	(United States) Philadelphia Union	Signed new contract	
December 20, 2017	33	DF	(Brazil) Fabinho	(United States) Philadelphia Union	Signed new contract	
December 21, 2017	21	FW	(Jamaica) Cory Burke	(United States) Bethlehem Steel FC	Signed	
January 18, 2018	32	DF	(United States) Matthew Real	(United States) Bethlehem Steel FC	Signed as Homegrown Player	
January 18, 2018	4	DF	(United States) Mark McKenzie	(United States) Bethlehem Steel FC	Signed as Homegrown Player	
January 19, 2018	7	MF	(Ghana) David Accam	(United States) Chicago Fire	$1,200,000 allocation money	
April 17, 2018	5	DF	(Cameroon) Olivier Mbaizo	(United States) Bethlehem Steel FC	Signed	

=== Out ===
Date	No.	Pos.	Player	Transferred to	Fee/notes	Source
November 1, 2017	4	DF	(United States) Ken Tribbett	(United States) Penn FC	Declined contract option	
November 1, 2017	5	DF	(United States) Oguchi Onyewu		Declined contract option	
November 1, 2017	8	MF	(United States) Maurice Edu		Declined contract option	
November 1, 2017	9	FW	(United States) Charlie Davies	Retired	Declined contract option	
November 1, 2017	10	MF	(Netherlands) Roland Alberg	(Bulgaria) CSKA Sofia	Declined contract option	
November 1, 2017	13	MF	(United States) Chris Pontius	(United States) LA Galaxy	End of contract	
November 1, 2017	14	MF	(Germany) Fabian Herbers	(United States) Philadelphia Union	Declined contract option, re-signed new contract	
November 1, 2017	19	DF	(England) Aaron Jones		Declined contract option	
November 1, 2017	25	MF	(Brazil) Ilsinho	(United States) Philadelphia Union	Declined contract option, re-signed new contract	
November 1, 2017	32	DF	(Netherlands) Giliano Wijnaldum	(Netherlands) Williem II	Declined contract option	
November 1, 2017	33	DF	(Brazil) Fabinho	(United States) Philadelphia Union	End of contract, re-signed new contract	

=== Loan in ===
Date	No.	Pos.	Player	Transferred from	Fee/notes	Source
February 28, 2018	10	MF	(Czech Republic) Bořek Dočkal	(China) Henan Jianye F.C.	Loan for 2018 season	

=== Retirement ===
In May 2018, long time Philadelphia Union forward Sebastian Le Toux announced his retirement from professional soccer. Making a name for himself as a top player for the Philadelphia Union, Le Toux signed a ceremonial one-day contract to retire as a Philadelphia player. His retirement ceremony was held on June 23, 2018, during a home match against Vancouver Whitecaps FC, where he was the first inductee into the Union's Ring of Honor.
