= Matthew Real =

American soccer player (born 1999)

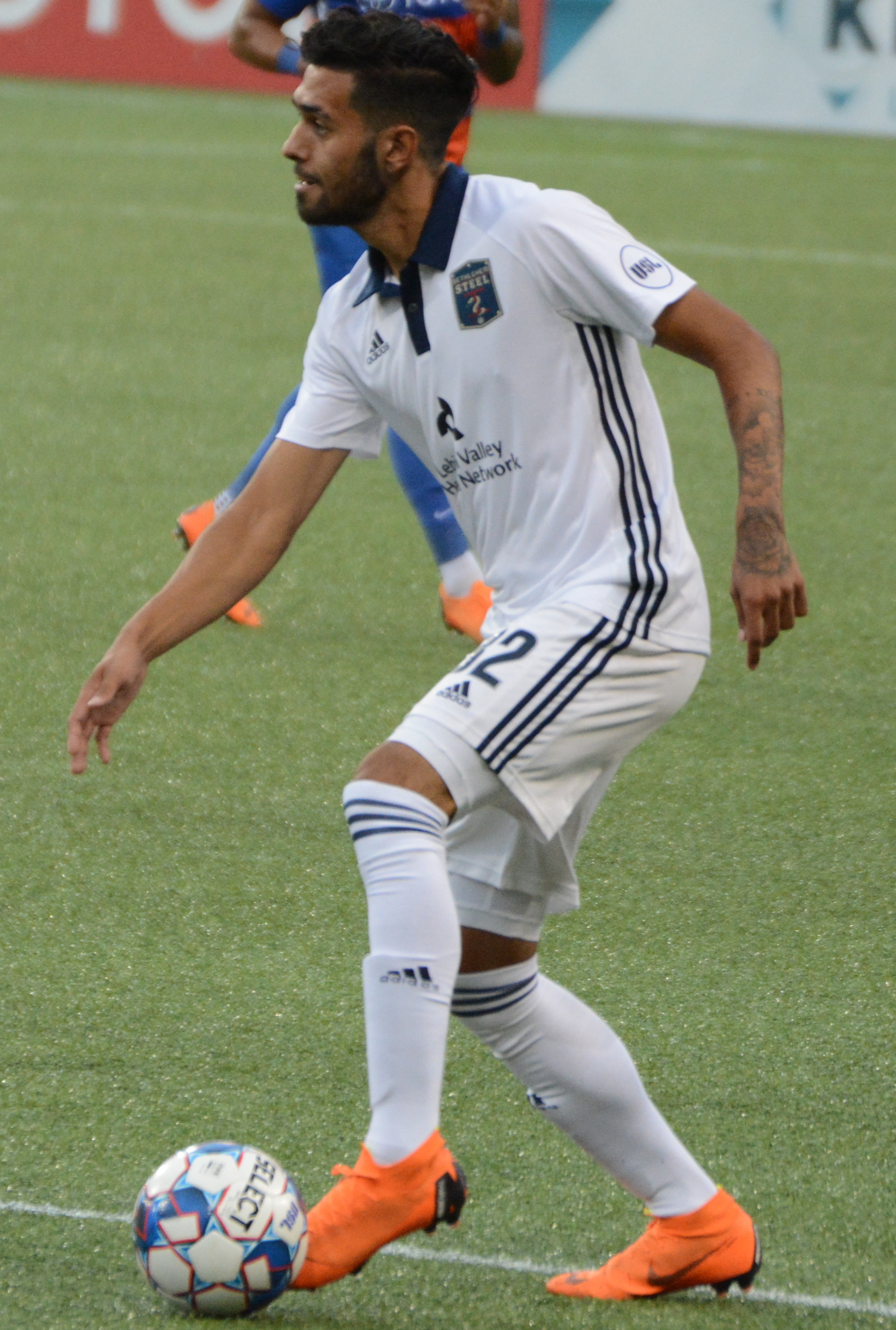
- Real with Bethlehem Steel in 2018

Personal information
- Full name: Matthew Joseph Real
- Date of birth: July 10, 1999 (age 27)
- Place of birth: Drexel Hill, Pennsylvania, United States
- Height: 6 ft 0 in (1.83 m)
- Position: Left-back

Team information
- Current team: Hartford Athletic
- Number: 3

Youth career
- 2013–2016: Philadelphia Union

Senior career*
Years	Team	Apps	(Gls)
2016–2019	Bethlehem Steel	57	(2)
2018–2024	Philadelphia Union	52	(2)
2022–2024	Philadelphia Union II	10	(4)
2024	→ Colorado Springs Switchbacks (loan)	26	(1)
2025	Colorado Springs Switchbacks	22	(1)
2026–	Hartford Athletic	11	(0)

International career
2017	United States U18	8	(0)
2018–2019	United States U20	11	(0)
- * Club domestic league appearances and goals as of November 4, 2026

Matthew Joseph Real (born July 10, 1999) is an American professional soccer player who plays as a left-back for Hartford Athletic in the USL Championship.

== Club career ==
=== Bethlehem Steel FC ===
Real signed an amateur deal to play with United Soccer League side Bethlehem Steel FC for their 2016 season. He had committed to play college soccer at Wake Forest University, before opting to sign a professional contract with Bethlehem Steel FC on January 17, 2017.

=== Philadelphia Union ===
Real signed a homegrown contract with Bethlehem Steel's MLS parent club Philadelphia Union on January 18, 2018. Real made his MLS debut in the Union's 3–0 loss to the Colorado Rapids on March 31, 2018. Putting forth a solid 75-minute performance, saving a goal on the line to keep the Rapids scoreless heading into the half. In September 2020, Real scored his first goal for the Union as a substitute in a 3–0 victory over New York Red Bulls.

=== Colorado Springs Switchbacks ===
In April 2024, Real joined USL Championship club Colorado Springs Switchbacks on loan for the 2024 season.

Real signed with the Switchbacks on a permanent deal in January 2025.

=== Hartford Athletic ===
He transferred to Hartford Athletic in December 2025.

== Personal life ==
Real was born in the United States to a Brazilian father and an Italian American mother.

== Career statistics ==
As of match played November 21, 2021

Club	Season	League			National cup		Continental		Other		Total	
Club	Season	Division	Apps	Goals	Apps	Goals	Apps	Goals	Apps	Goals	Apps	Goals
Bethlehem Steel	2016	USL Championship	2	0	—		—		0	0	2	0
Bethlehem Steel	2017	USL Championship	18	1	—		—		1 (Note: Appearances in USL Cup Playoffs)	0	19	1
Bethlehem Steel	2018	USL Championship	21	1	—		—		1	0	22	1
Bethlehem Steel	2019	USL Championship	18	0	—		—		0	0	18	0
Bethlehem Steel	Total		59	2	0	0	0	0	2	0	61	2
Philadelphia Union	2018	Major League Soccer	3	0	1 (Note: Appearances in U.S. Open Cup)	0	—		0	0	4	0
Philadelphia Union	2019	Major League Soccer	3	0	1	0	—		0	0	4	0
Philadelphia Union	2020	Major League Soccer	15	1	—		—		1 (Note: Appearances in MLS is Back Tournament)	0	16	1
Philadelphia Union	2021	Major League Soccer	8	0	0	0	3 (Note: Appearances in CONCACAF Champions League)	0	0	0	11	0
Philadelphia Union	Total		29	1	2	0	3	0	1	0	35	1
Career total			88	3	2	0	3	0	3	0	96	3

== Honors ==
Philadelphia Union

- Supporters' Shield: 2020
- MLS Cup runner-up: 2022

United States U20

- CONCACAF U-20 Championship: 2018
