= Jack Elliott (footballer) =

English footballer (born 1995)

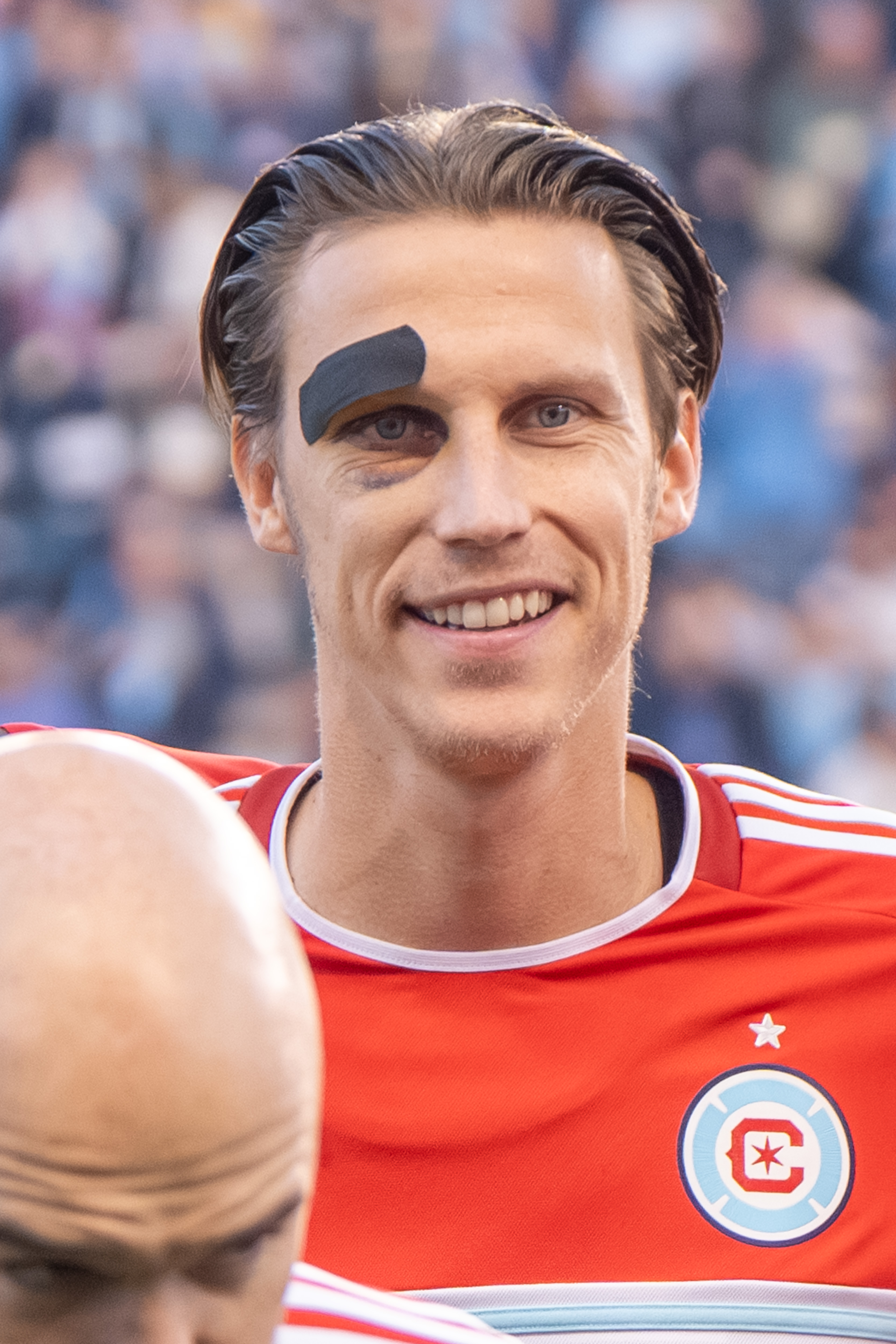
- Elliott with the Chicago Fire in 2025

Personal information
- Full name: Jack Stuart Elliott
- Date of birth: 25 August 1995 (age 31)
- Place of birth: London, England
- Height: 1.98 m (6 ft 6 in)
- Position: Centre-back

Team information
- Current team: Chicago Fire
- Number: 3

Youth career
- Fulham

College career
| Years | Team | Apps | (Gls) |
| 2013–2016 | West Virginia Mountaineers | 68 | (6) |

Senior career*
| Years | Team | Apps | (Gls) |
| 2016 | South Florida Surf | 7 | (0) |
| 2017–2024 | Philadelphia Union | 223 | (10) |
| 2017–2018 | Philadelphia Union II | 2 | (0) |
| 2025– | Chicago Fire | 63 | (3) |
- * Club domestic league appearances and goals as of November 17, 2026

Jack Stuart Elliott (born 25 August 1995) is an English professional footballer who plays as a centre-back for and captains Major League Soccer club Chicago Fire.

== Youth ==
Elliott was born in London, England to Scottish parents. Attending Wilson's School in Wallington, he spent a year playing for Fulham at the age of 12 before being scouted by West Virginia University whilst playing in the Surrey Senior Cup.

== Playing career ==
=== College and amateur ===
Elliott played four years of college soccer at West Virginia University between 2013 and 2017. He also played in the Premier Development League for South Florida Surf in 2016.

=== Club ===
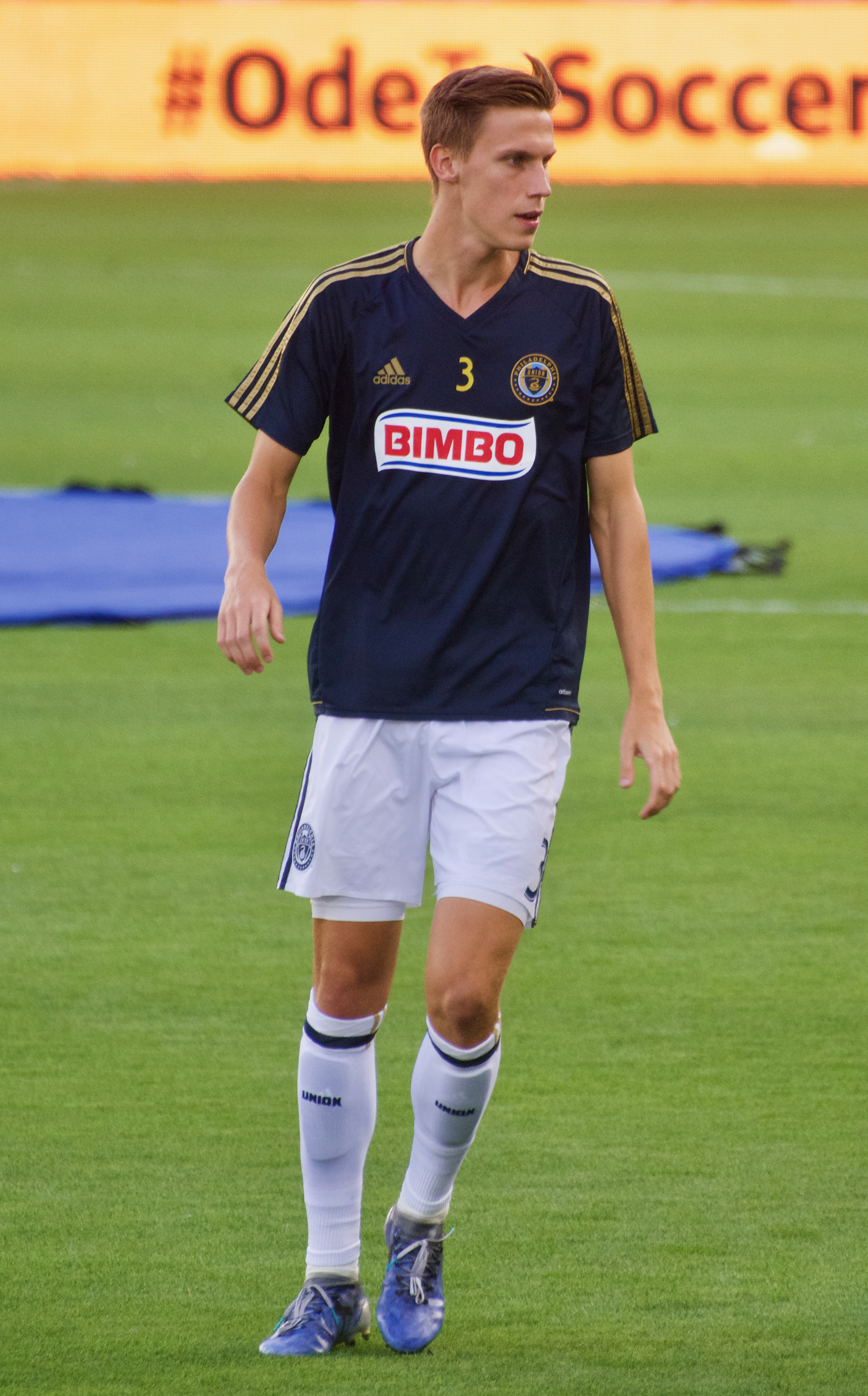
Elliott with Philadelphia Union in 2017

==== Philadelphia Union ====
On 17 January 2017, Elliott was drafted in the fourth round (77th overall) of the 2017 MLS SuperDraft by Philadelphia Union. He signed with Philadelphia on 24 February 2017. Elliott made his professional debut for the Union on 1 April as a substitute for Richie Marquez against D.C. United. Elliott became a regular starter for the Union through the rest of the season earning 30 appearances; 29 as a starter. He scored his first professional goal against San Jose Earthquakes, the first equalizer of an ultimate 2–2 away draw. Elliott's first season contributions earned him a nomination for the 2017 MLS Rookie of the Year award, but ultimately finished third in the running behind Abu Danladi and winner Julian Gressel.

During his first two seasons with the Union, Elliott earned two starts with Bethlehem Steel FC, the Union's second division team. Elliott scored his first brace for the Union during the 2018 season in a 3–2 win over the New England Revolution. During the 2019 season, Elliott developed a steady partnership next to the rotation of Union homegrown centerbacks Auston Trusty and Mark McKenzie, starting every match in the season. In May 2019, he was awarded a new contract with the Union through 2021 with an option for 2022. During the Union's opening playoff match of the 2019 season, he scored the second goal in a 4–3 comeback victory against New York Red Bulls, the first playoff win in club history.

The 2020 season, while disrupted by the COVID-19 pandemic, earned Elliott's and the Union's first trophy winning the 2020 Supporters' Shield.

The 2022 season saw the Union reach the MLS Cup finals, in which Elliott played a critical role, scoring a tying goal late in regulation, then putting in the Union's third goal in stoppage time of the second overtime.

In the 2024 season, Elliott made 28 league appearances and registered a career high three assists. Following the season, Elliott turned down a contract offer from the Union and left the club as a free agent, ending an eight-season tenure in which he made 270 appearances in all competitions.

==== Chicago Fire ====
On 16 December 2024, Elliott was signed by Chicago Fire as a free agent on a one-year deal with a club option for 2026. In his first season with the Fire, Elliott started 36 matches across the regular season and playoffs, scoring a career high four goals, including a stoppage time equaliser in a playoff defeat on penalties to his former club Philadelphia Union. Following the season, the club exercised his contract option for 2026.

Elliott serves as the Fire's club captain. In March 2026, he was hospitalised due to sepsis, missing several weeks before returning to the lineup in April.

== Career statistics ==
As of 28 July 2026

Appearances and goals by club, season and competition
| Club | Season | League | | | Playoffs | | Cup | | Leagues Cup | | Continental | | Other | | Total | |
| Club | Season | Division | Apps | Goals | Apps | Goals | Apps | Goals | Apps | Goals | Apps | Goals | Apps | Goals | Apps | Goals |
|---|---|---|---|---|---|---|---|---|---|---|---|---|---|---|---|---|
| Philadelphia Union | 2017 | MLS | 30 | 1 | — | | 2 | 0 | — | | — | | — | | 32 | 1 |
| Philadelphia Union | 2018 | MLS | 17 | 2 | 0 | 0 | 3 | 1 | — | | — | | — | | 20 | 3 |
| Philadelphia Union | 2019 | MLS | 34 | 2 | 2 | 1 | 0 | 0 | — | | — | | — | | 36 | 3 |
| Philadelphia Union | 2020 | MLS | 17 | 1 | 1 | 0 | — | | — | | — | | 3 (Note: Appearances in the MLS is Back Tournament Playoffs) | 0 | 21 | 1 |
| Philadelphia Union | 2021 | MLS | 33 | 2 | 2 | 0 | 0 | 0 | — | | 6 | 0 | — | | 41 | 2 |
| Philadelphia Union | 2022 | MLS | 32 | 2 | 3 | 2 | 1 | 0 | — | | — | | — | | 36 | 4 |
| Philadelphia Union | 2023 | MLS | 32 | 0 | 3 | 0 | 1 | 0 | 7 | 0 | 4 | 0 | — | | 47 | 0 |
| Philadelphia Union | 2024 | MLS | 28 | 0 | — | | — | | 7 | 0 | 2 | 0 | — | | 37 | 0 |
| Philadelphia Union | Totals | | 223 | 10 | 11 | 3 | 7 | 1 | 14 | 0 | 12 | 0 | 3 | 0 | 270 | 14 |
| Philadelphia Union II | 2017 | USL | 1 | 0 | — | | — | | — | | — | | — | | 1 | 0 |
| Philadelphia Union II | 2018 | USL | 1 | 0 | — | | — | | — | | — | | — | | 1 | 0 |
| Philadelphia Union II | Totals | | 2 | 0 | — | | — | | — | | — | | —| | | 2 | 0 |
| Chicago Fire | 2025 | MLS | 33 | 3 | 3 | 1 | 3 | 0 | — | | — | | — | | 39 | 4 |
| Chicago Fire | 2026 | MLS | 14 | 0 | — | | 2 | 0 | — | | — | | — | | 16 | 0 |
| Chicago Fire | Totals | | 47 | 3 | 3 | 1 | 5 | 0 | — | | — | | —| | | 55 | 4 |
| Career totals | | | 272 | 13 | 14 | 4 | 12 | 1 | 14 | 0 | 12 | 0 | 3 | 0 | 327 | 18 |

== Honours ==
Philadelphia Union

- Supporters' Shield: 2020
- MLS Cup runner-up: 2022
- U.S. Open Cup runner-up: 2018
