= Fabian Herbers =

German footballer (born 1993)

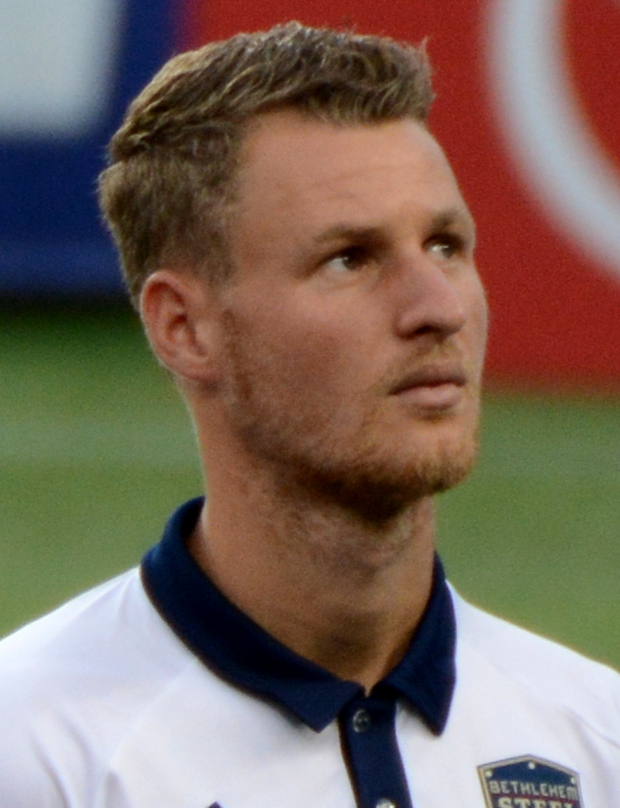
- Herbers with Bethlehem Steel in 2018

Personal information
- Date of birth: 17 August 1993 (age 33)
- Place of birth: Ahaus, Germany
- Height: 1.84 m (6 ft 0 in)
- Positions: Forward; attacking midfielder

Team information
- Current team: CF Montréal
- Number: 21

Youth career
- FC Ottenstein
- SuS Stadtlohn
- FC Twente
- Preußen Münster

College career
Years	Team	Apps	(Gls)
2013–2015	Creighton Bluejays	62	(28)

Senior career*
Years	Team	Apps	(Gls)
2012–2013	VfL Rhede	31	(7)
2016–2018	Philadelphia Union	53	(4)
2016–2018	→ Bethlehem Steel (loan)	23	(8)
2019–2024	Chicago Fire	152	(15)
2025–	CF Montréal	16	(1)
- * Club domestic league appearances and goals as of 16:20, 8 January 2026 (UTC)

Fabian Herbers (born 17 August 1993) is a German professional footballer who plays as a forward for CF Montréal in Major League Soccer.

== Club career ==
=== Early career ===
Prior to playing in the United States, Herbers competed for both FC Twente, SC Preußen Münster and VfL Rhede at youth level. He then played three years of college soccer in the United States at Creighton University between 2013 and 2015 before signing a Generation Adidas contract with Major League Soccer.

=== Philadelphia Union ===
Herbers was selected sixth overall in the 2016 MLS SuperDraft by Philadelphia Union. He made his Union debut on 6 March 2016, as an 83rd-minute substitute during a 2–0 loss against FC Dallas. He began his career playing between the Union and Bethlehem Steel FC, making a total of six Steel appearances and scoring two goals in 2016, including the franchise's first-ever goal in a 1–0 win on 25 March in their first match against FC Montreal. He scored his first goal for the Union during a 3–2 win vs. Columbus Crew SC on 1 June 2016 in the 83rd minute after being subbed on 8 minutes prior. In 2016, he totaled 32 league appearances, scoring three goals and leading all league rookies with seven helpers. He also scored one goal and one assist in two U.S. Open Cup appearances.

2017 was a frustrating year for Herbers as he totalled only 15 appearances. He scored his first goal of the season during a substitute appearance in a 4–0 win at D.C. United. Herbers suffered a groin injury vs. Colorado Rapids on 20 May 2017 and missed a month before returning to practice and suffering a sports hernia, ending his 2017 season.

=== Chicago Fire ===
On 9 December 2018, Herbers was traded to Chicago Fire in exchange for a second-round pick in the 2019 MLS SuperDraft. Herbers was released by Chicago following their 2024 season.

=== CF Montréal ===
On 3 January 2025, Herbers signed as a free agent with Canadian MLS side CF Montréal on a two-year deal.

== Personal life ==
Herbers earned his U.S. green card in July 2017.

== Career statistics ==
As of match played 8 November 2020

Appearances and goals by club, season and competition
Club	Season	League			Domestic Cup		League Cup		Continental Cup		Total	
Club	Season	Division	Apps	Goals	Apps	Goals	Apps	Goals	Apps	Goals	Apps	Goals
VfL Rhede	2012–13	Oberliga Niederrhein	31	7	—		—		—		31	7
Philadelphia Union	2016	Major League Soccer	32	3	2	1	1 (Note: Appearance(s) in MLS Cup Playoffs)	0	—		35	4
Philadelphia Union	2017	Major League Soccer	12	1	—		—		—		12	1
Philadelphia Union	2018	Major League Soccer	9	0	1	0	—		—		10	0
Philadelphia Union	Total		53	4	3	1	1	0	0	0	57	5
Bethlehem Steel FC (loan)	2016	United Soccer League	6	2	—		—		—		6	2
Bethlehem Steel FC (loan)	2017	United Soccer League	3	1	—		—		—		3	1
Bethlehem Steel FC (loan)	2018	United Soccer League	14	5	—		—		—		14	5
Bethlehem Steel FC (loan)	Total		23	8	0	0	0	0	0	0	23	8
Chicago Fire	2019	Major League Soccer	17	3	1	0	—		0	0	18	3
Chicago Fire	2020	Major League Soccer	21	4	—		—		—		21	4
Chicago Fire	Total		38	7	1	0	0	0	0	0	39	7
Career total			145	26	4	1	1	0	0	0	150	27
