= Derrick Jones (soccer) =

American soccer player (born 1997)

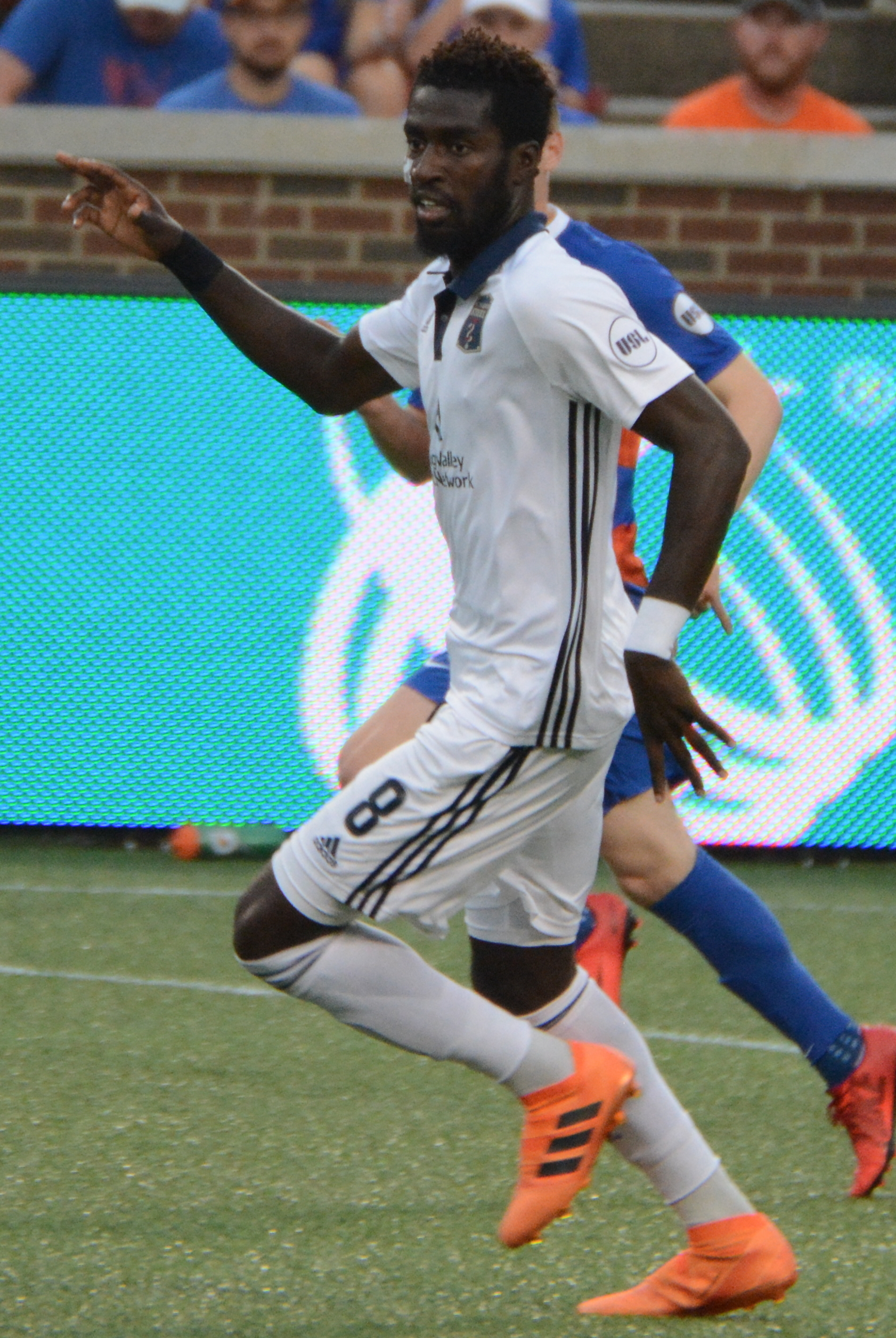
- Jones with Bethlehem Steel in 2018

Personal information
- Full name: Derrick Jones Amaniampong
- Date of birth: March 3, 1997 (age 29)
- Place of birth: Bantama, Ghana
- Height: 6 ft 4 in (1.93 m)
- Position: Midfielder

Youth career
- 2011–2012: LMSC Panthers
- 2012–2013: Junior Lone Star
- 2013–2016: Philadelphia Union

Senior career*
Years	Team	Apps	(Gls)
2016–2019	Bethlehem Steel	54	(10)
2016–2019	Philadelphia Union	27	(0)
2019–2020	Nashville SC	24	(0)
2021–2022	Houston Dynamo	20	(0)
2022–2023	Charlotte FC	44	(1)
2024–2025	Columbus Crew	23	(0)

International career^{‡}
2017	United States U20	4	(0)
2019	United States U23	2	(0)
- * Club domestic league appearances and goals as of 08:19, 21 July 2025 (UTC) ‡ National team caps and goals as of May 20, 2019

Derrick Jones Amaniampong (born March 3, 1997) is a professional soccer player who last played as a midfielder. Born in Ghana, he played for the United States national under-23 team. In March 2026, Jones was issued a lifetime ban from playing in Major League Soccer after an investigation found that he and former teammate Yaw Yeboah had bet on matches while playing for the Columbus Crew in the 2024 and 2025 seasons.

== Youth ==
Born in Bantama, Ghana, Jones and his family moved to Philadelphia, Pennsylvania in 2012 when he was 14. After arriving in Philadelphia, Jones began playing with Junior Lone Star FC, a club team founded by immigrants from West Africa living in Philadelphia. In 2013 Junior Lone Star played a friendly against the Philadelphia Union U-18s. The Union's academy director Tommy Wilson was at the game and was impressed with what he saw from Jones. A few days after the game, Jones joined the Union Academy and began playing with the U-16s. The following season, Jones was promoted to the U-18s.

== Club career ==
=== Bethlehem Steel ===
On December 3, 2015, Jones signed with Bethlehem Steel FC, the Philadelphia Union's USL affiliate, becoming their first-ever player signing. He made his debut for Steel FC on April 3, 2016, in a 2–1 loss to FC Cincinnati. On April 17 Jones scored his first goal for Bethlehem in a 2–1 win against the Richmond Kickers. He scored in the 84th minute on May 15 to give Steel a 2–1 victory over FC Montreal.

=== Philadelphia Union ===
On July 26, 2016, Jones signed a Homegrown Player contract with the Philadelphia Union, the 4th in team history. After signing to the Union, he remained with Philadelphia's USL affiliate Bethlehem Steel for the rest of the 2016, ending the season with 5 goals and 3 assists from 26 appearances for Bethlehem.

On March 5, 2017, Jones made his Union debut in Philadelphia's opening match of the 2017 MLS season, a 0–0 draw with the Vancouver Whitecaps. He scored his first goal for the Union on June 15 in a 3–1 victory over the Harrisburg City Islanders in a U.S. Open Cup match. Jones ended the regular season with 12 appearances for Philadelphia as the Union finished 8th in the Eastern Conference, failing to qualify for the MLS Cup Playoffs. He also played for the Bethlehem Steel throughout the season, making 11 appearances and scoring once during the USL regular season while also playing once in the USL playoffs.

During the 2018 season, Jones once again split his time between the Union and Steel FC. He made 12 MLS regular season appearances for the Union, helping them finish 6th in the East and qualify for the playoffs. He made a substitute appearance in Philadelphia's one playoff match, a 3–1 loss to NYCFC. He also made 3 appearances and had 1 assist in the Open Cup play as he helped the Union reach the final, where they lost 3–0 to the Houston Dynamo, with Jones making a substitute appearance in the final. Jones also made 14 appearances and scored 4 goals for Bethlehem Steel. During the USL Playoffs, Bethlehem would reach the semifinals, but Jones did not appear in any of the playoff games.

In 2019, Jones made 2 appearances for Philadelphia and 3 for Bethlehem before being traded.

=== Nashville SC ===
On May 9, 2019, Jones was traded to 2020 MLS expansion club Nashville SC in exchange for $175,000 in General Allocation Money. Because the franchise would not start playing in Major League Soccer until 2020, Jones played for the club while still in the USL Championship. He made his debut for Nashville (USL) on May 14, in a 3–2 win over South Georgia Tormenta FC 2 in a U.S. Open Cup match. On May 29, Jones suffered a broken ankle in a match with the Charleston Battery, causing him to miss over 3 months of the season. On October 26, Jones came off the bench and scored in Nashville's first playoff game, a 3–1 victory against Charleston. He made another substitute appearance in their next playoff match, a 1–0 loss to Indy Eleven. He ended the season with 10 appearances across all competitions for Nashville.

On August 12, 2020, Jones made his debut for Nashville SC in a 1–0 win against FC Dallas. He ended the shortened season due to the COVID-19 pandemic with 18 appearances and 2 assists in the regular season, helping Nashville qualify for the playoffs. Jones made substitute appearances in all 3 of Nashville's playoff games, helping them reach the conference semifinals, where they lost 2–0 to Toronto FC.

=== Houston Dynamo ===
On January 21, 2021, Jones was traded to the Houston Dynamo in exchange for $250,000 in General Allocation Money. He made his Dynamo debut on April 16, coming on as a substitute in a 2–1 win over the San Jose Earthquakes. On May 12, Jones picked up an assist in a 1–0 win against Sporting Kansas City. He ended the season with 20 appearances and 1 assist as the Dynamo finished last in the Western Conference, missing out on the playoffs.

=== Charlotte FC ===
On March 9, 2022, Jones was traded to Charlotte FC along with $50,000 in 2023 GAM in exchange for $250,000 in 2022 GAM. He was released by Charlotte following their 2023 season.

=== Columbus Crew ===
On December 21, 2023, Jones signed a two-year deal with Columbus Crew as a free agent.

On October 25, 2025, Jones, along with former Columbus Crew teammate Yaw Yeboah, was placed on administrative leave by the MLS pending a review of potential rule violations. While on leave, he is prohibited from participating in team activities and competitions. On November 26, Jones' contract option was declined. On March 9, 2026, following an investigation by the league, he and Yeboah were issued lifetime bans from the league. The investigation found that the pair had "engaged in extensive gambling" together during the 2024 and 2025 seasons, including in one instance both players betting Jones would receive a yellow card in an October 2024 match, and that they also likely exchanged confidential information with other bettors about how the pair planned to receive yellow cards during certain games.

== International career ==
Jones grew up in Ghana but has dual citizenship with the United States, having moved to the country when he was 14 years old. Jones represented Ghana at U15 level but accepted a call up to represent the U.S. U20 in October 2016. He played for the U.S. at the 2017 FIFA U-20 World Cup, making 4 appearances as the Americans reached the quarterfinals.

== Career statistics ==
As of October 10, 2022

Club	Season	League			National cup		League cup (Note: Includes USL Championship Playoffs and MLS Cup Playoffs)		Continental		Total	
Club	Season	Division	Apps	Goals	Apps	Goals	Apps	Goals	Apps	Goals	Apps	Goals
Bethlehem Steel	2016	United Soccer League	26	5	—		—		—		26	5
Bethlehem Steel	2017	United Soccer League	11	1	—		1	0	—		12	1
Bethlehem Steel	2018	United Soccer League	14	4	—		0	0	—		14	4
Bethlehem Steel	2019	USL Championship	3	0	—		—		—		3	0
Bethlehem Steel	Total		54	10	0	0	1	0	0	0	55	10
Philadelphia Union	2016	Major League Soccer	0	0	0	0	0	0	—		0	0
Philadelphia Union	2017	Major League Soccer	12	0	2	1	—		—		14	1
Philadelphia Union	2018	Major League Soccer	12	0	3	0	1	0	—		16	0
Philadelphia Union	2019	Major League Soccer	2	0	0	0	0	0	—		2	0
Philadelphia Union	Total		26	0	5	1	1	0	0	0	32	1
Nashville SC	2019	USL Championship	6	0	2	0	2	1	—		10	1
Nashville SC	2020	Major League Soccer	18	0	—		3	0	—		21	0
Houston Dynamo	2021	Major League Soccer	20	0	—		—		—		20	0
Charlotte FC	2022	Major League Soccer	16	1	2	0	0	0	—		18	1
Columbus Crew	2024	Major League Soccer	14	0	0	0	5	0	—		14	0
Career Total			154	11	9	1	12	1	0	0	168	13

== Honors ==
Columbus Crew

- Leagues Cup: 2024
- CONCACAF Champions Cup runner-up: 2024
