= Prosper Chiluya =

Zambian footballer (born 1998)

Personal information
- Date of birth: 2 April 1998 (age 28)
- Place of birth: Lusaka, Zambia
- Height: 1.78 m (5 ft 10 in)
- Position: Defender

Team information
- Current team: Kafue Celtic

Youth career
- OYDC Football Academy

Senior career*
Years	Team	Apps	(Gls)
- Lumwana Radiants
2016–	Kafue Celtic		
2017	→ Pafos (loan)	0	(0)
2018	→ Bethlehem Steel (loan)	16	(1)

International career
2015–	Zambia U-20	10	(0)
2019-	Zambia U-23		
- * Club domestic league appearances and goals as of 09:29, 15 October 2018 (UTC)

Prosper Chiluya (born 2 April 1998) is a Zambian footballer who plays as a defender for Kafue Celtic.

== Playing career ==
=== Kafue Celtic ===
Chiluya spent time with Zambian club Kafue Celtic before going on loan with Pafos FC in Cyprus in 2017.

==== Loan to Bethlehem Steel FC ====
In February 2019, Chiluya later joined United Soccer League side Bethlehem Steel on loan 2018 season. Making regular starts in the defense, Chiluya scored his first goal against Indy Eleven. The goal stood as the match winner and won the team's honor as 2018 Steel FC Goal of the Year. Chiluya made 16 total appearances for Steel FC by the conclusion to his loan at the end of the season.
