= Tonny Temple =

American soccer player

Personal information
- Date of birth: September 2, 2000 (age 26)
- Place of birth: Monrovia, Liberia
- Height: 5 ft 10 in (1.78 m)
- Position: Forward

Team information
- Current team: Ottawa Spirit
- Number: 17

Youth career
- 2013–2016: Philadelphia Union
- 2016–2017: IMG Academy
- 2017–2019: Philadelphia Union

College career
| Years | Team | Apps | (Gls) |
| 2019 | NC State Wolfpack | 15 | (6) |
| 2020–2021 | Akron Zips | 7 | (2) |
| 2021– | Ottawa Spirit | 18 | (4) |

Senior career*
| Years | Team | Apps | (Gls) |
| 2018 | Bethlehem Steel | 7 | (4) |
- * Club domestic league appearances and goals as of 15 October 2018

Tonny Temple (born September 2, 2000) is an American soccer player who plays for Ottawa Spirit.

== Career ==
Temple appeared as an amateur player for United Soccer League side Bethlehem Steel FC during their 2018 season via the Philadelphia Union academy.
