= Anthony Fontana =

American soccer player

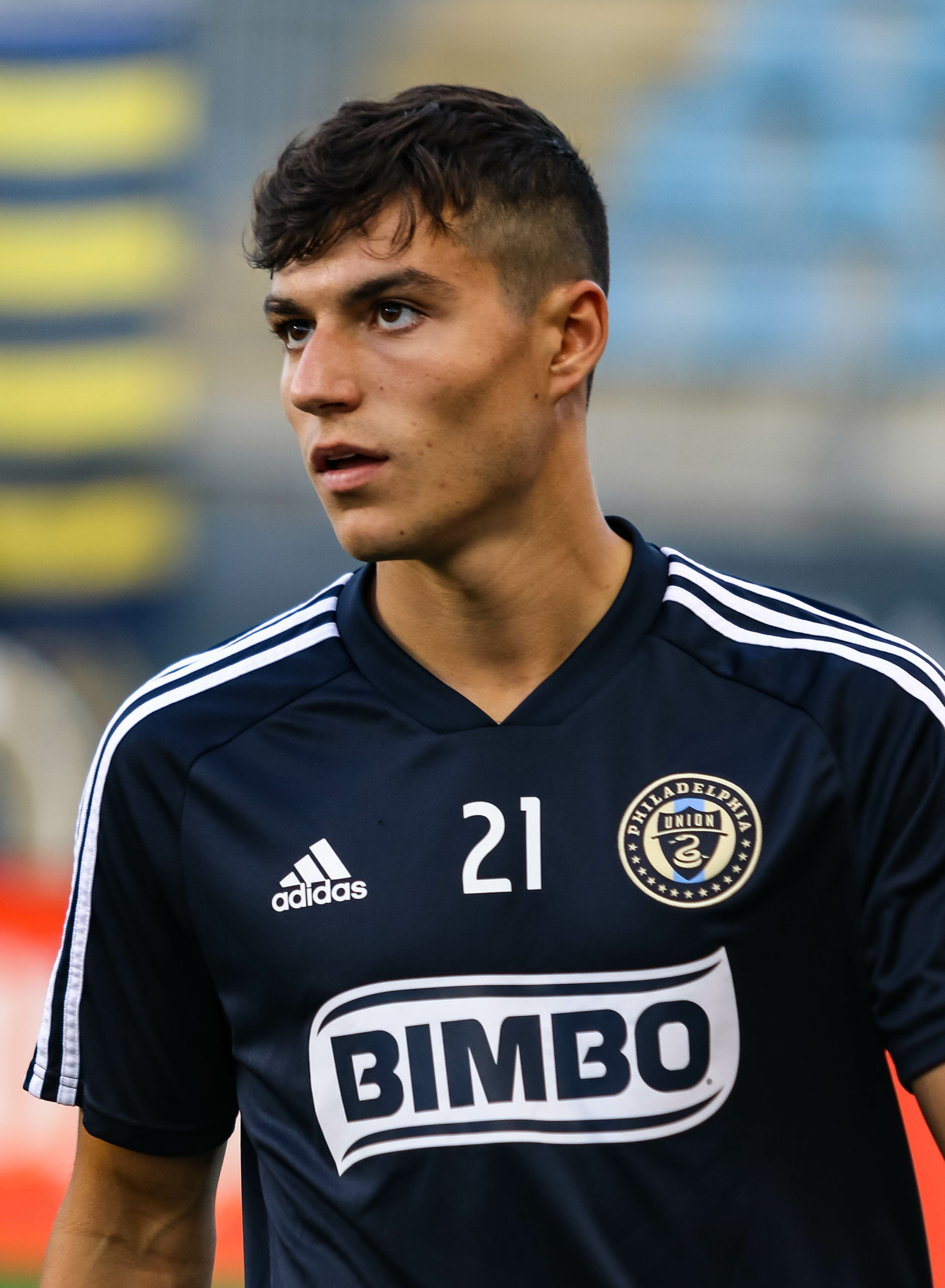
- Fontana with Philadelphia Union in 2019

Personal information
- Date of birth: October 14, 1999 (age 27)
- Place of birth: Newark, Delaware, United States
- Height: 5 ft 8 in (1.73 m)
- Position: Midfielder

Team information
- Current team: Brooklyn FC
- Number: 21

Youth career
- 2013–2016: Philadelphia Union

Senior career*
Years	Team	Apps	(Gls)
2016–2019	Bethlehem Steel	48	(1)
2018–2021	Philadelphia Union	42	(8)
2022–2023	Ascoli	2	(0)
2023–2025	PEC Zwolle	14	(0)
2025	Colorado Springs Switchbacks	16	(2)
2026–	Brooklyn FC	8	(0)

International career
2018	United States U20	2	(4)
- * Club domestic league appearances and goals as of November 4, 2026

Anthony Fontana (born October 14, 1999) is an American professional soccer player who plays as a midfielder for Brooklyn FC in the USL Championship.

== Youth soccer ==
Fontana began his recreational youth league development with Kirkwood Soccer Club in New Castle, Delaware at age 4. By age 10, Fontana had his first participation with the Philadelphia Union Academy and became a full-time participant in 2014.

== Club career ==
=== Bethlehem Steel ===
Fontana developed at the Philadelphia Union Academy and made his way through to Bethlehem Steel FC, the Philadelphia Union's second team as an academy player. He made his professional debut against FC Cincinnati in July 2016 at 16 years of age. He would go on to make 8 appearances for Steel during their inaugural season.

The next season, Fontana saw an additional 11 appearances for Steel FC, and even earned an appearance for the Union during their summer friendly against Swansea City.

=== Philadelphia Union ===
On July 17, 2017, Fontana signed a homegrown player contract with Philadelphia Union. Fontana became an active Union player on January 1, 2018.

On March 3, 2018, Fontana made his debut for Philadelphia Union, starting in the season opener against New England Revolution. He scored the opening goal of the season against the Revolution which was ultimately the game-winner. Fontana became the first Union homegrown player to score a brace when he came into the match as a substitute against the New England Revolution in September 2020. Fontana became a standout in the substitution role and finishing the 2020 season scoring six goals in 523 minutes of play, contributing the Union's first major trophy in the 2020 Supporters' Shield.

In the Union's debut season in the CONCACAF Champions League, Fontana became the first homegrown player to score a Champions League goal in a 4–0 home victory over Deportivo Saprissa, advancing to the quarterfinals. Despite being a starter at the beginning of the 2021 season, Fontana missed nearly two months due to concussion protocol. Fontana's contract concluded at the end of the 2021 season finishing with 51 appearances and 12 goals for the Union.

=== Ascoli ===
In February 2022, Fontana officially signed for Serie B club, Ascoli. On January 31, 2023, Fontana's contract with Ascoli was terminated by mutual consent.

=== PEC Zwolle ===
On March 8, 2023, Fontana signed with Eerste Divisie side PEC Zwolle on a deal until the end of the season. On January 2, 2025, Fontana and Zwolle mutually agreed to terminate his deal with the club.

=== Colorado Springs Switchbacks ===
On January 6, 2025, Fontana returned to the United States, joining USL Championship side Colorado Springs Switchbacks.

=== Brooklyn FC ===
In September 2026, Fontana signed with USL Championship side Brooklyn FC for the remainder of the 2026 season.

== International career ==
Fontana was born in the United States and is of Italian descent. Fontana has appeared in the 2018 CONCACAF U-20 Championship representing United States.

== Career statistics ==
=== Club ===
As of match played February 12, 2022

Appearances and goals by club, season and competition
Club	Season	League			National cup		Continental		Other		Total	
Club	Season	Division	Apps	Goals	Apps	Goals	Apps	Goals	Apps	Goals	Apps	Goals
Bethlehem Steel FC	2016	USL Championship	8	0	—		—		—		8	0
Bethlehem Steel FC	2017	USL Championship	11	0	—		—		—		11	0
Bethlehem Steel FC	Total		19	0	0	0	0	0	0	0	19	1
Bethlehem Steel FC (loan)	2018	USL Championship	15	1	—		—		1 (Note: Appearance in USL Cup Playoffs)	0	16	1
Philadelphia Union II (loan)	2019	USL Championship	14	0	—		—		—		14	0
Philadelphia Union	2018	Major League Soccer	5	1	1	1	—		—		6	2
Philadelphia Union	2019	Major League Soccer	8	1	1	1	—		—		9	2
Philadelphia Union	2020	Major League Soccer	17	6	—		—		2 (Note: Appearances in the MLS is Back Tournament) (Note: Appearance(s) in the MLS Cup Playoffs)	0	19	6
Philadelphia Union	2021	Major League Soccer	12	0	—		4 (Note: Appearances in the CONCACAF Champions League)	2	1	0	17	2
Philadelphia Union	Total		42	8	2	2	4	2	3	0	51	12
Ascoli	2021–22	Serie B	1	0	—		—		—		1	0
Career total			91	9	2	2	4	2	4	0	101	13

== Honors ==
Philadelphia Union

- Supporters' Shield: 2020
