= Cory Burke =

Jamaican footballer (born 1991)

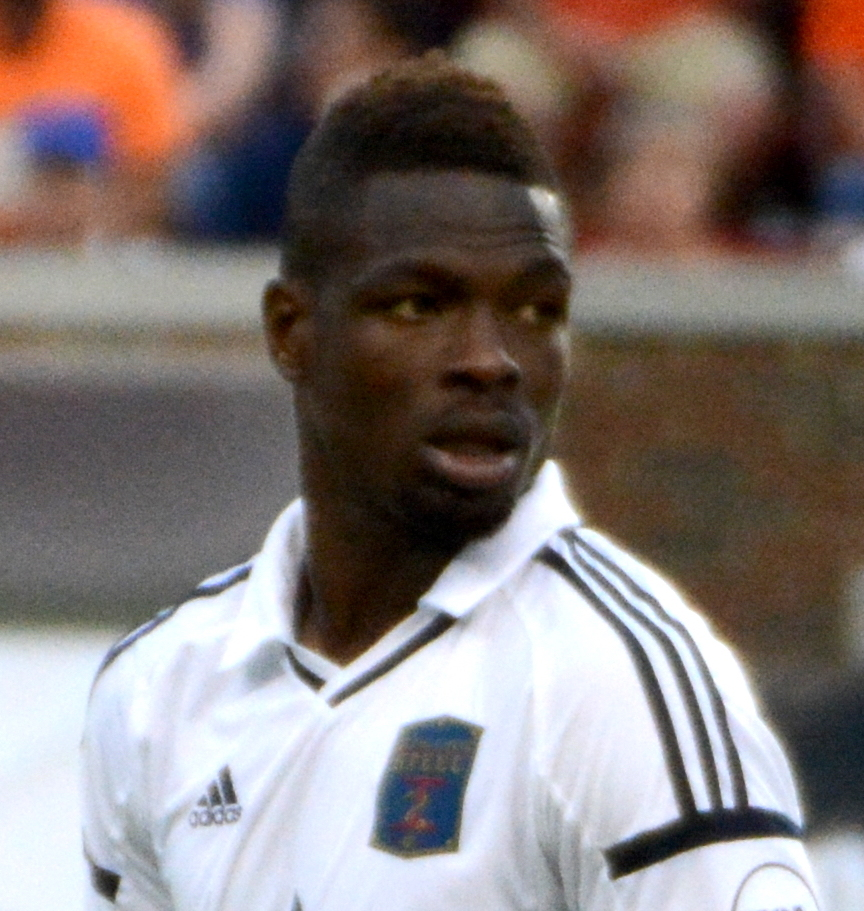
- Burke with Bethlehem Steel in 2017

Personal information
- Full name: Cory Lamar Crossgill Burke
- Date of birth: 28 December 1991 (age 34)
- Place of birth: Kingston, Jamaica
- Height: 6 ft 4 in (1.93 m)
- Position: Forward

Youth career
- Old Harbour High

Senior career*
Years	Team	Apps	(Gls)
2013–2016	Rivoli United	77	(26)
2016	→ Bethlehem Steel (loan)	21	(4)
2017	Bethlehem Steel	24	(9)
2018–2022	Philadelphia Union	93	(25)
2018	→ Bethlehem Steel (loan)	4	(2)
2019	→ Portmore United (loan)	18	(11)
2020	→ St. Pölten (loan)	11	(4)
2023–2024	New York Red Bulls	41	(3)
2025	Lexington SC	20	(6)

International career^{‡}
2016–	Jamaica	35	(9)
Medal record
Men's football
Representing Jamaica
CONCACAF Gold Cup
Runner-up	2017 United States	Team
CONCACAF Nations League
Bronze medal – third place	2024 United States	Team
- * Club domestic league appearances and goals as of 30 October 2025 ‡ National team caps and goals as of 21 March 2024

Cory Lamar Crossgill Burke (born 28 December 1991) is a Jamaican professional footballer who plays as a forward for the Jamaica national team.

== Club career ==
=== Rivoli United ===
Born in Kingston, Jamaica, Burke began his career with schoolboy side Old Harbour High. Between 2013 and 2015, Cory Burke played three seasons for Rivoli United, where he totaled 26 goals and was second in goals in Jamaica's Red Stripe Premier League for the 2015–16 season.

=== Bethlehem Steel FC ===
Burke's performance for Rivoli United sparked interest abroad and on 17 February 2016, he joined the newly formed Bethlehem Steel FC on a year-long loan. After registering 4 goals from 20 appearances during Steel FC's 2016 season, Burke's loan deal was made permanent by official transfer in November 2016.

=== Philadelphia Union ===
After spending two seasons with Philadelphia Union's USL affiliate in Bethlehem, Burke was officially signed to the MLS team on 21 December 2017. Burke made his debut for the Union on 3 March 2018, as a substitute in the home opener against New England Revolution, registering an assist on the Union's second goal. Burke began to establish himself as a regular starter, culminating in being the joint top scorer on the season (alongside Fafà Picault) with 10 goals.

Due to an error in renewing his U.S. visa in May 2019, Burke was unable to play for the Union. At the time, he was also in the process of applying for a green card for permanent residency in the U.S. He officially returned to Philadelphia in October 2020 and made his first appearance in 18 months as a substitute against New England Revolution. Burke scored against the Revolution weeks later as the final goal of the Union's season, resulting in the team's first MLS Supporter's Shield title.

==== Loans to Portmore and St. Pölten ====
On 4 September 2019, Burke was loaned to Portmore United whilst his ongoing visa issue were solved. During his time with Portmore, Burke found consistent scoring form leading the National Premier Leagues scoring with 11 goals (7 goals in 8 matches) midway through the season. Burke finish his time at Portmore with 11 goals in 20 matches.

On 6 February 2020, Burke moved to Austrian Bundesliga side St. Pölten on loan until June 2020 as a result of his visa issues. He scored his first goals for St. Pölten on 2 June, netting a hat-trick against Swarovski Tirol. Burke scored 4 goals from 11 appearances during his loan in Austria.

==== Return to Philadelphia ====
After the resolution of his visa issues Burke's loan with St. Pölten came to an end in July 2020 and he returned to the Union. Burke would see very little playing time in with the Union in 2020, scoring 2 goals in 5 appearances. At the conclusion of the 2020 season, Burke signed a new two-year contract with the Union, with an option for a third year. The 2021 season would see Burke becoming a regular part of the Union roster both as a starter and substitute scoring 4 goals and 2 assists in 19 games. In 2022 Burke would appear in 33 of the Union's 34 regular season game primarily coming on as a sub for striker Mikael Uhre and would score 7 goals and create 5 assists in the regular season. Burke would continue to appear in the Union's playoff run scoring a goal in the Union's 3–1 win over New York City Football Club in the Eastern Conference Final.

On 15 November 2022, the Union announced they were declining Burke's contract option for 2023.

=== New York Red Bulls ===
On 21 November 2022, Burke signed a two-year deal with New York Red Bulls. On 29 April 2023, Burke scored his first goal for New York, a late equalizer in a 1–1 draw with Chicago Fire FC. On 20 May 2023, Burke scored the winning goal for New York in a 2–1 victory over CF Montréal.

On 15 May 2024, Burke scored his first goal of the year in a 4–1 victory over Atlantic Cup rivals D.C. United.

=== Lexington SC ===
On February 26, 2025, Burke signed a deal with USL Championship club Lexington Sporting Club.

== International career ==
In 2016, Burke made his senior team debut versus Haiti and scored his first international goal against Guyana. Burke's second international goal was scored against Suriname in the final group match of the 2017 Caribbean Cup qualification, sending Jamaica to the 2017 Gold Cup. Burke made five appearances during the 2017 Gold Cup, where Jamaica finished runner-up to the United States.

Burke scored four goals for Jamaica during the 2019–20 CONCACAF Nations League qualifying ultimately helping Jamaica earn a spot in League B of the inaugural competition.

During the 2021 CONCACAF Gold Cup, Burke was called up alongside Philadelphia Union teammates Andre Blake and Alvas Powell. He scored an equalizing goal against Guadeloupe during the group stage; marking his seventh national team goal. Making four appearances for the Reggae Boyz during the competition, Jamaica was ultimately knocked out during the quarterfinals against the United States.

== Career statistics ==
=== Club ===
As of match played 4 June 2023

Appearances and goals by club, season and competition
Club	Season	League			Cup (Note: Includes U.S. Open Cup) and USL Cup		Continental		Other		Total	
Club	Season	Division	Apps	Goals	Apps	Goals	Apps	Goals	Apps	Goals	Apps	Goals
Rivoli United	2013–14	National Premier League	29	2	0	0	0	0	0	0	29	2
Rivoli United	2014–15	National Premier League	31	12	0	0	0	0	0	0	31	12
Rivoli United	2015–16	National Premier League	17	12	0	0	0	0	0	0	17	12
Rivoli United	Total		77	26	0	0	0	0	0	0	77	26
Bethlehem Steel FC	2016 (loan)	USL Championship	21	4	—		—		0	0	21	4
Bethlehem Steel FC	2017	USL Championship	24	9	—		—		1 (Note: Appearance in USL Cup Playoffs)	0	25	9
Bethlehem Steel FC	2018 (loan)	USL Championship	4	2	—		—		0	0	4	2
Bethlehem Steel FC	Total		49	15	0	0	0	0	1	0	50	15
Philadelphia Union	2018	Major League Soccer	29	10	5	3	—		1 (Note: Appearances in MLS Cup Playoffs)	1	35	14
Philadelphia Union	2019	Major League Soccer	7	2	0	0	—		0	0	7	2
Philadelphia Union	2020	Major League Soccer	5	2	0	0	—		1	0	6	2
Philadelphia Union	2021	Major League Soccer	19	4	0	0	4 (Note: Appearances in CONCACAF Champions League)	0	2	0	25	4
Philadelphia Union	2022	Major League Soccer	33	7	1	0	0	0	3	1	37	8
Philadelphia Union	Total		93	25	6	3	4	0	7	2	110	30
Portmore United (loan)	2019–20	National Premier League	18	11	0	0	—		0	0	18	11
St. Pölten (loan)	2019–20	Austrian Bundesliga	11	4	0	0	—		0	0	11	4
New York Red Bulls	2023	Major League Soccer	23	2	2	0	0	0	0	0	25	2
New York Red Bulls	2024	Major League Soccer	18	1	0	0	1	0	0	0	19	1
Lexington Sporting Club	2025	USL Championship	20	6	6	3	0	0	0	0	26	9
Career total			309	90	14	6	5	0	8	2	336	98

=== International ===
As of match played 21 March 2024

Appearances and goals by national team and year
National team	Year	Apps	Goals
Jamaica	2016	3	2
Jamaica	2017	10	0
Jamaica	2018	3	4
Jamaica	2019	2	0
Jamaica	2021	8	1
Jamaica	2022	1	0
Jamaica	2023	7	2
Jamaica	2024	1	0
Total		35	9

Scores and results list Jamaica's goal tally first, score column indicates score after each Burke goal.

List of international goals scored by Cory Burke
No.	Date	Venue	Opponent	Score	Result	Competition
1	11 October 2016	Leonora Stadium, Leonora, Guyana	Guyana	4–2	4–2	2017 Caribbean Cup qualification
2	13 November 2016	Independence Park, Kingston, Jamaica	Suriname	1–0	1–0	2017 Caribbean Cup qualification
3	9 September 2018	Independence Park, Kingston, Jamaica	Cayman Islands	2–0	4–0	2019–20 CONCACAF Nations League qualification
4	9 September 2018	Independence Park, Kingston, Jamaica	Cayman Islands	4–0	4–0	2019–20 CONCACAF Nations League qualification
5	14 October 2018	Ergilio Hato Stadium, Willemstad, Curaçao	Bonaire	1–0	6–0	2019–20 CONCACAF Nations League qualification
6	17 November 2018	Montego Bay Sports Complex, Montego Bay, Jamaica	Suriname	1–0	2–1	2019–20 CONCACAF Nations League qualification
7	16 July 2021	Exploria Stadium, Orlando, United States	Guadeloupe	1–1	2–1	2021 CONCACAF Gold Cup
8	19 June 2023	Stadion Wiener Neustadt, Wiener Neustadt, Austria	Jordan	1–0	1–2	Friendly
9	2 July 2023	Levi's Stadium, Santa Clara, United States	Saint Kitts and Nevis	5–0	5–0	2023 CONCACAF Gold Cup

== Honours ==
Philadelphia Union

- Supporters' Shield: 2020
- MLS Cup runner-up: 2022
