= Marcus Epps (soccer) =

American soccer player (born 1995)

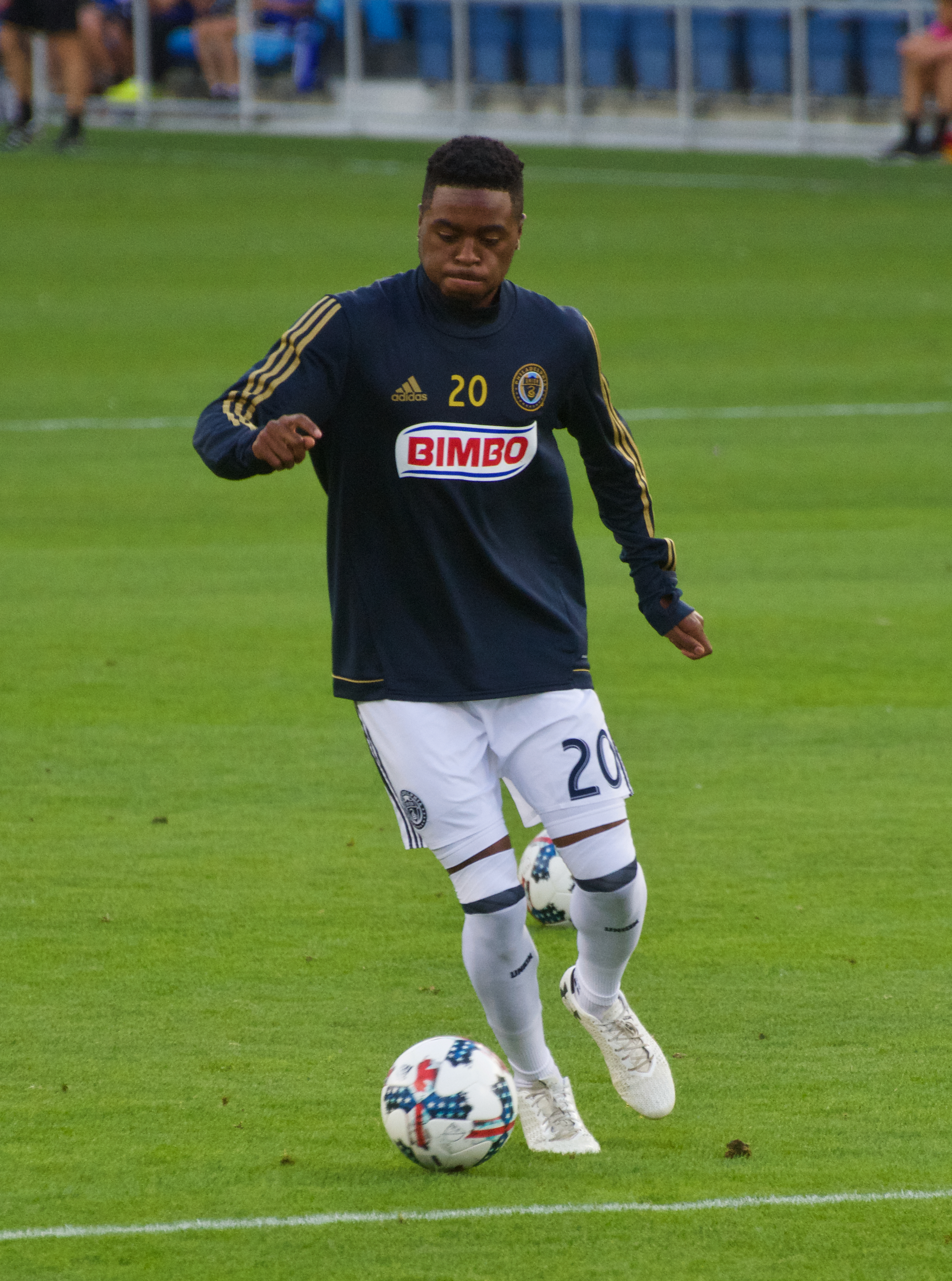

Personal information
- Full name: Roderick Marcus Epps
- Date of birth: January 16, 1995 (age 31)
- Place of birth: Jackson, Mississippi, United States
- Height: 1.87 m (6 ft 2 in)
- Position: Winger

Team information
- Current team: Lexington SC

Youth career
- 2011–2012: Chicago Fire

College career
Years	Team	Apps	(Gls)
2013–2016	USF Bulls	75	(8)

Senior career*
Years	Team	Apps	(Gls)
2014–2015	Chicago Fire U-23	19	(3)
2017–2018	Philadelphia Union	32	(3)
2017–2018	→ Bethlehem Steel (loan)	25	(3)
2019	New York Red Bulls	3	(0)
2019	→ New York Red Bulls II (loan)	19	(2)
2019	→ Memphis 901 (loan)	15	(3)
2020	Portland Timbers 2	13	(4)
2021	San Antonio FC	32	(6)
2022	Phoenix Rising	18	(2)
2022–2023	FC Tulsa	43	(11)
2024	Hartford Athletic	34	(3)
2025–	Lexington SC	59	(12)
- * Club domestic league appearances and goals as of 11:24, 9 November 2026 (UTC)

Roderick Marcus Epps (born January 16, 1995) is an American soccer player who plays as a winger for Lexington SC in the USL Championship. He plays as a winger.

== Career ==
=== Youth and college ===
Epps played four years of college soccer at the University of South Florida between 2013 and 2016, making 75 appearances and scoring 8 goals.

While at college, Epps also appeared for Premier Development League side Chicago Fire U-23 in 2014 and 2015.

== Professional ==
=== Philadelphia Union ===
On January 13, 2017, Epps was selected 25th overall in the 2017 MLS SuperDraft by Philadelphia Union. He signed with the club on February 6, 2017. Epps made his professional debut on April 1, 2017, while on loan with the Union's United Soccer League affiliate Bethlehem Steel, playing 90 minutes in a 3–2 loss to Rochester Rhinos. On May 27, 2017, Epps made his MLS debut, appearing as a second-half substitute in a 1–0 loss to Real Salt Lake. Epps scored his first goal as a professional on June 14, 2017, helping Philadelphia to a 3–1 victory over Harrisburg City Islanders in the Lamar Hunt U.S. Open Cup. On July 26, 2017, he scored his first league goal in a 3–0 victory over Columbus Crew.

=== New York Red Bulls ===
On December 12, 2018, Epps was selected by New York Red Bulls as the first pick in the MLS Waiver Draft. New York traded a second-round pick in the 2019 MLS SuperDraft to San Jose Earthquakes in exchange for the first pick in the Waiver Draft. On March 2, 2019, Epps made his debut with the club, appearing as a starter in a 1–1 draw with Columbus Crew on the opening day of the season.

During the 2019 season Epps was sent on loan to New York Red Bulls II and on March 9, 2019, in his first match with the side, scored one goal and assisted on another in a 3–1 victory over Swope Park Rangers.

On August 2, 2019, Epps was loaned to USL Championship side Memphis 901 FC.

=== Portland Timbers 2 ===
Following his release from New York at the end of the 2019 season, Epps joined USL Championship side Portland Timbers 2.

=== San Antonio FC ===
Epps signed with USL Championship side San Antonio FC on January 22, 2021. Epps led San Antonio in games started, games played, and minutes played in a season that saw SAFC reach the Western Conference Finals.

=== Phoenix Rising FC ===
In December 2021, Epps signed a multi-year contract with Phoenix Rising FC.

=== FC Tulsa ===
On July 27, 2022, Epps was traded to FC Tulsa in exchange for forward JJ Williams. He left Tulsa at the end of their 2023 season.

=== Hartford Athletic ===
On December 19, 2023, Hartford Athletic announced Marcus Epps as a signing for the 2024 USL Championship Season.

=== Lexington SC ===
Epps joined Lexington SC on December 12, 2024, ahead of the club's first season competing in the USL Championship.

== Career statistics ==
As of July 7, 2019

Club	Season	League		Playoffs		US Open Cup		CONCACAF		Total	
Club	Season	Apps	Goals	Apps	Goals	Apps	Goals	Apps	Goals	Apps	Goals
Bethlehem Steel	2017	13	1	0	0	0	0	0	0	13	1
Bethlehem Steel	2018	12	2	0	0	0	0	0	0	12	2
Bethlehem Steel	Total	25	3	0	0	0	0	0	0	25	3
Philadelphia Union	2017	19	2	0	0	2	1	0	0	21	3
Philadelphia Union	2018	13	1	0	0	3	1	0	0	16	2
Philadelphia Union	Total	32	3	0	0	5	2	0	0	37	5
New York Red Bulls	2019	3	0	0	0	0	0	0	0	3	0
New York Red Bulls II	2019	14	1	0	0	0	0	0	0	14	1
Career total		74	7	0	0	5	2	0	0	79	9
