= Olivier Mbaizo =

Cameroonian footballer (born 1997)

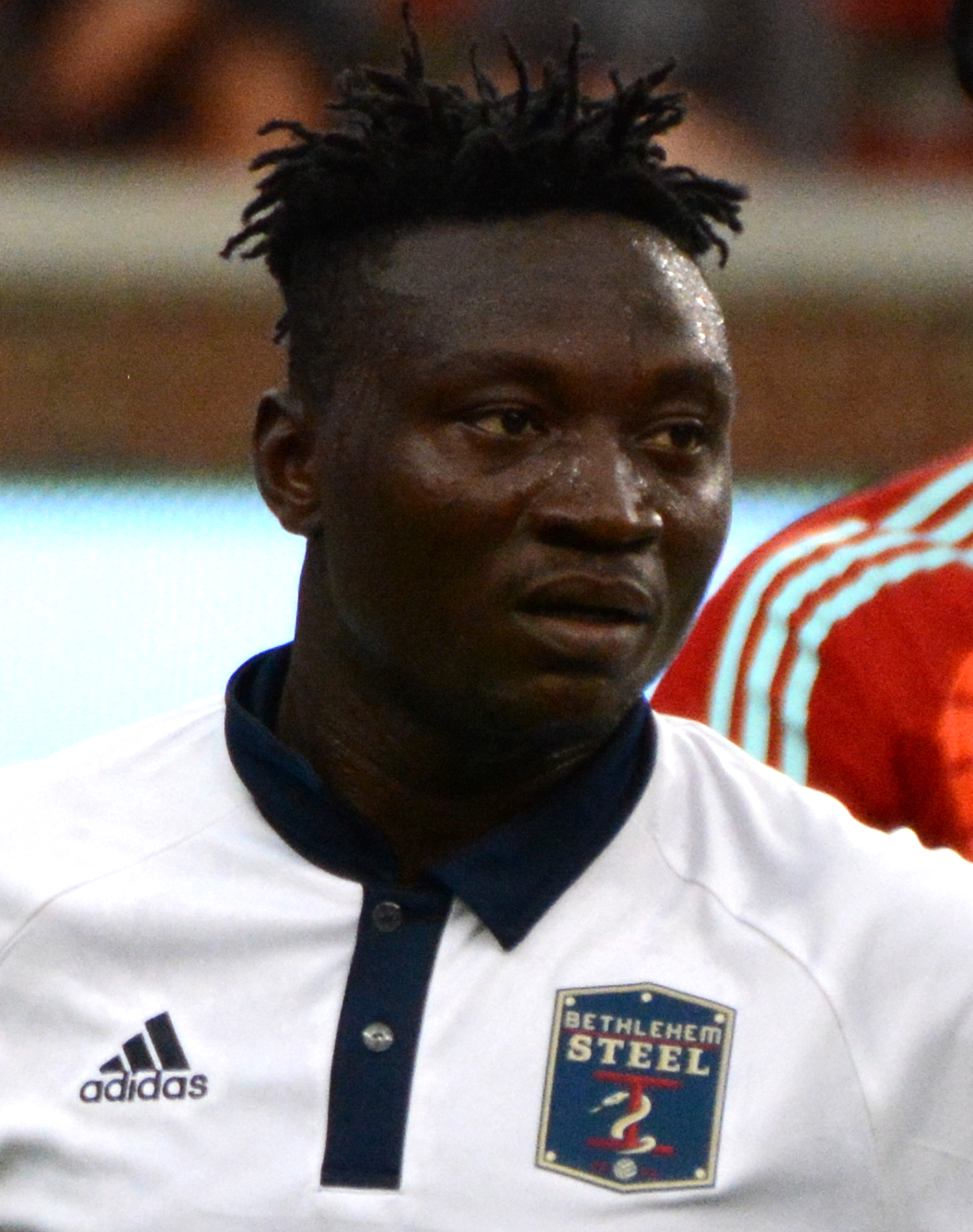
- Mbaizo with Bethlehem Steel in 2018

Personal information
- Full name: Olivier Mbaissidara Mbaizo
- Date of birth: 15 August 1997 (age 29)
- Place of birth: Douala, Cameroon
- Height: 5 ft 11 in (1.80 m)
- Position: Defender

Senior career*
| Years | Team | Apps | (Gls) |
| 2016 | Union Douala | | |
| 2017 | Rainbow Bamenda | 10 | (0) |
| 2018 | Bethlehem Steel | 0 | (0) |
| 2018–2026 | Philadelphia Union | 122 | (0) |
| 2018–2019 | → Bethlehem Steel (loan) | 33 | (1) |

International career^{‡}
- Cameroon U17
| 2017 | Cameroon U20 | 3 | (1) |
| 2019 | Cameroon U23 | 3 | (0) |
| 2016– | Cameroon | 14 | (0) |
Medal record
Men's football
Representing Cameroon
Africa Cup of Nations
| Third place | 2021 Cameroon |
- * Club domestic league appearances and goals as of 21:17, 18 June 2026 (UTC) ‡ National team caps and goals as of 07:14, 25 March 2025 (UTC)

Olivier Mbaissidara Mbaizo (born 15 August 1997) is a Cameroonian professional footballer who plays as a defender for the Cameroon national team.

== Club career ==
=== Union Douala ===
Mbaizo began his professional career at Union Douala of MTN Elite One league in 2016. He helped Douala to 4th in the league table and made an appearance in the CAF Champions League against Zamalek.

=== Rainbow ===
In 2017, Mbaizo played for Rainbow making 10 appearances during the season.

=== Bethlehem Steel ===
In January 2018, Mbaizo signed for the Bethlehem Steel, the USL affiliate of the Philadelphia Union. The organization reunites him with fellow Cameroonian youth national, Eric Ayuk.

=== Philadelphia Union ===
By April 2018, Mbaizo was signed to Bethlehem Steel's MLS affiliate Philadelphia Union after impressing with the first team during preseason training. While signed with the Union, Mbaizo would mostly be loaned back to Bethlehem for the 2018 season. He made his first team debut for the Union in September, starting in a 2–0 win over Sporting Kansas City.

== International career ==
Mbaizo has worked his way up the Cameroonian national team ladder starting with the U17s in 2014. In 2017, he appeared with Cameroon's U-20's for the 2017 Africa U-20 Cup of Nations. He started all three matches and played every minute of the team's Group Stage. Mbaizo scored a goal in their second match of the tournament, a 4–1 victory over Sudan on 2 March 2017.

Mbaizo was called up in November 2020 for the 2021 Africa Cup of Nations qualifying matches. He made his first start for Cameroon on 12 November in a 4–1 victory over Mozambique.

== Career statistics ==
=== Club ===
As of match played 2 October 2024

Appearances and goals by club, season and competition
| Club | Season | League | | | Cup | | Continental | | Other | | Total | |
| Club | Season | Division | Apps | Goals | Apps | Goals | Apps | Goals | Apps | Goals | Apps | Goals |
|---|---|---|---|---|---|---|---|---|---|---|---|---|
| Bethlehem Steel | 2018 | USL Championship | 24 | 0 | — | | — | | 2 (Note: Appearance(s) in USL Cup Playoffs) | 0 | 26 | 0 |
| Bethlehem Steel | 2019 | USL Championship | 9 | 1 | — | | — | | — | | 9 | 1 |
| Bethlehem Steel | Total | | 33 | 1 | — | | — | | 2 | 0 | 35 | 1 |
| Philadelphia Union | 2018 | Major League Soccer | 1 | 0 | — | | — | | — | | 1 | 0 |
| Philadelphia Union | 2019 | Major League Soccer | 3 | 0 | 1 | 0 | — | | — | | 4 | 0 |
| Philadelphia Union | 2020 | Major League Soccer | 14 | 0 | — | | — | | — | | 14 | 0 |
| Philadelphia Union | 2021 | Major League Soccer | 30 | 0 | — | | 6 (Note: Appearance(s) in CONCACAF Champions League) | 0 | 1 (Note: Appearance(s) in MLS Cup Playoffs) | 0 | 37 | 0 |
| Philadelphia Union | 2022 | Major League Soccer | 19 | 0 | 1 | 0 | — | | 3 | 0 | 23 | 0 |
| Philadelphia Union | 2023 | Major League Soccer | 24 | 0 | 0 | 0 | 4 | 0 | 6 (Note: Four Appearances in Leagues Cup, two appearances in MLS Cup Playoffs) | 0 | 34 | 0 |
| Philadelphia Union | 2024 | Major League Soccer | 21 | 0 | — | | 3 | 0 | 6 (Note: Appearance(s) in Leagues Cup) | 0 | 30 | 0 |
| Philadelphia Union | Total | | 112 | 0 | 2 | 0 | 13 | 0 | 16 | 0 | 143 | 0 |
| Career total | | | 145 | 1 | 2 | 0 | 13 | 0 | 18 | 0 | 174 | 1 |

=== International ===
As of match played 12 October 2023

Appearances and goals by national team and year
| National team | Year | Apps | Goals |
|---|---|---|---|
| Cameroon | 2016 | 1 | 0 |
| Cameroon | 2017 | 0 | 0 |
| Cameroon | 2018 | 0 | 0 |
| Cameroon | 2019 | 0 | 0 |
| Cameroon | 2020 | 2 | 0 |
| Cameroon | 2021 | 5 | 0 |
| Cameroon | 2022 | 3 | 0 |
| Cameroon | 2023 | 3 | 0 |
| Total | | 14 | 0 |

== Honours ==
Philadelphia Union

- Supporters' Shield: 2020, 2025
- Eastern Conference (MLS): 2022
- MLS Cup runner-up: 2022

Cameroon

- Africa Cup of Nations bronze: 2021
