= 2017 Bethlehem Steel FC season =

Bethlehem Steel FC
2017 season
- Ownership Group: Keystone S&E
- Head coach: Brendan Burke
- Stadium: Goodman Stadium
- USL: 8th place
- USL Playoffs: First Round
- Top goalscorer: Seku Conneh (10)
- Highest home attendance: 3,215 (Jul. 9 vs. New York)
- Lowest home attendance: 2,976 (Apr. 23 vs. Orlando)
- Average home league attendance: 3,054
Home colors	Away colors

The 2017 season was Bethlehem Steel FC's second season of competitive soccer in the United Soccer League and first season competing in the second division of American soccer. Steel FC competed in the league's Eastern Conference.

== Roster ==
Note: Flags indicate national team as defined under FIFA eligibility rules; some limited exceptions apply. Players may hold more than one non-FIFA nationality. Squad correct as of June 21, 2017.

No.	Pos.	Nation	Player
4	DF	USA	Ken Tribbett
12	DF	USA	Keegan Rosenberry
15	DF	GHA	Josh Yaro
16	DF	USA	Richie Marquez
19	DF	ENG	Aaron Jones
20	MF	USA	Marcus Epps
24	MF	USA	Adam Najem
26	DF	USA	Auston Trusty
29	GK	USA	Jake McGuire
32	DF	NED	Giliano Wijnaldum
36	FW	LBR	Seku Conneh
37	FW	CAN	Chris Nanco
38	FW	ESP	Santi Moar
39	FW	JAM	Amoy Brown
40	MF	CAN	Josh Heard
41	FW	JAM	Cory Burke
42	DF	USA	Hugh Roberts
43	MF	NOR	Chris Wingate
44	DF	USA	Charlie Reymann
45	MF	IRL	James Chambers
47	DF	USA	Matthew Real
48	DF	USA	Matt Mahoney
49	MF	USA	Yosef Samuel
50	DF	USA	Mark McKenzie
51	GK	USA	Matthew Freese
52	FW	USA	Issa Rayyan
55	MF	USA	Dawson McCartney
57	FW	JAM	Justin McMaster
60	MF	USA	Josue Monge
64	GK	SLV	Tomas Romero

Signed to first team contract with Philadelphia Union.
Philadelphia Union Academy player.

== Transfers ==
=== In ===
Date	Player	Number	Position	Previous club	Fee/notes
November 14, 2016	(Jamaica) Cory Burke	41	FW	(Jamaica) Rivoli United	Loan made permanent
December 22, 2016	(United States) Hugh Roberts	42	DF	(United States) Richmond Kickers	Undisclosed
January 17, 2017	(United States) Matthew Real	47	DF	(United States) Philadelphia Union Academy	Undisclosed
January 30, 2017	(Spain) Santi Moar	38	FW	(United States) Pfeiffer Falcons	2017 Philadelphia Union Draft Signing
March 2, 2017	(United States) Charlie Reymann	44	DF	(United States) Kentucky Wildcats	Trialist signing
March 3, 2017	(United States) Matt Mahoney	48	DF	(United States) Temple Owls	Trialist signing
March 8, 2017	(Canada) Chris Nanco	37	FW	(United States) Syracuse Orange	2017 Philadelphia Union Draft Signing
April 5, 2017	(Norway) Chris Wingate	43	MF	(United States) New Hampshire Wildcats	Trialist signing

=== Out ===
Date	Player	Number	Position	New club	Fee/notes
September 29, 2016	(Liberia) Gabe Gissie	37	FW	(United States) Sacramento Republic FC	Contract declined
September 29, 2016	(United States) Nick Bibbs	38	DF	—N/a	Contract declined
September 29, 2016	(United States) Jamie Luchini	43	FW	—N/a	Contract declined
September 29, 2016	(Brazil) Fred	47	MF	—N/a	Contract declined
January 30, 2016	(Nigeria) Bolu Akinyode	42	MF	(United States) North Carolina FC	Transfer; Undisclosed fee
May 1, 2017	(United States) Matt Perrella	46	GK	(United States) Jacksonville Armada	Released

=== Loan in ===
Date	Player	Number	Position	Loaned from	Fee/notes
April 1, 2017	(United States) Ken Tribbett	4	DF	(United States) Philadelphia Union	Temporary loan
April 1, 2017	(United States) Brian Carroll	7	DF	(United States) Philadelphia Union	Temporary loan
April 1, 2017	(United States) Charlie Davies	9	DF	(United States) Philadelphia Union	Temporary loan
April 1, 2017	(England) Aaron Jones	19	DF	(United States) Philadelphia Union	Temporary loan
April 1, 2017	(United States) Marcus Epps	20	DF	(United States) Philadelphia Union	Temporary loan
April 1, 2017	(United States) Adam Najem	24	DF	(United States) Philadelphia Union	Temporary loan
April 1, 2017	(United States) Auston Trusty	26	DF	(United States) Philadelphia Union	Temporary loan
April 1, 2017	(Netherlands) Giliano Wijnaldum	32	DF	(United States) Philadelphia Union	Temporary loan
April 1, 2017	(United States) Josue Monge	60	DF	(United States) Philadelphia Union Academy	Academy Call-up
April 1, 2017	(El Salvador) Tomas Romero	64	GK	(United States) Philadelphia Union Academy	Academy Call-up
April 9, 2017	(England) Jack Elliott	3	DF	(United States) Philadelphia Union	Temporary loan
April 9, 2017	(United States) Jake McGuire	29	GK	(United States) Philadelphia Union	Temporary loan
April 9, 2017	(United States) Mark McKenzie	50	DF	(United States) Philadelphia Union Academy	Academy Call-up
April 9, 2017	(United States) Issa Rayyan	52	FW	(United States) Philadelphia Union Academy	Academy Call-up

== Competitions ==
Bethlehem Steel FC compete in USL, which is the second tier of the American soccer pyramid. Steel FC's affiliation with the Philadelphia Union of MLS has prevented the team from participating in the U.S. Open Cup competition. The decision to make affiliated "farm teams" ineligible for the U.S. Open Cup was decided since the 2016 iteration of the tournament.

=== Preseason ===
February 22 Preseason	Bethlehem Steel FC	7–0	Junior Lone Star FC	Wayne, Pennsylvania
2:00 p.m. EST	Moar 21', 31'; Samuel 44'; Conneh 57'; McMaster 66', 83'; Nanco 73'	Report		Stadium: YSC Academy

March 1 Preseason	Villanova University	2–3	Bethlehem Steel FC	Villanova, Pennsylvania
4:00 p.m. EST	Goal	Report	Moar; Samuel; Monge	Stadium: Higgins Soccer Complex

March 4 Preseason	Bethlehem Steel FC	1–0	Temple University	Chester, Pennsylvania
12:00 p.m. EST	Najem 20'	Report		Stadium: Power Training Complex

March 16 Preseason	Bethlehem Steel FC	1–1	Harrisburg City Islanders	Wayne, Pennsylvania
11:00 a.m. EST	Chambers	Report	Goal	Stadium: YSC Academy

March 16 Preseason	Bethlehem Steel FC	1–2	Notre Dame	Wayne, Pennsylvania
2:00 p.m. EST	Epps	Report	Gallagher	Stadium: YSC Academy

March 18 Preseason	New York Red Bulls II	2–1	Bethlehem Steel FC	Hanover, New Jersey
2:00 p.m. EST	Allen 16' (pen.); Valot 54'	Report	Davies 6'	Stadium: New York Red Bulls Training Facility

=== USL regular season ===
The 2017 USL season will be contested by 30 teams, 15 of which compete in the league's Eastern Conference. All teams will play a regular season total of 32 matches between teams within their respective conference. At the conclusion of the regular season, the top eight teams from each conference advance to the 2017 USL Playoffs for a chance to compete for the USL Championship Title.

==== Standings (Eastern Conference) ====
Pos	Team	Pld	W	D	L	GF	GA	GD	Pts	Qualification
1	Louisville City FC (C)	32	18	8	6	58	31	+27	62	Conference Playoffs
2	Charleston Battery	32	15	9	8	53	33	+20	54	Conference Playoffs
3	Tampa Bay Rowdies	32	14	11	7	50	35	+15	53	Conference Playoffs
4	Rochester Rhinos	32	14	11	7	36	28	+8	53	Conference Playoffs
5	Charlotte Independence	32	13	9	10	52	40	+12	48	Conference Playoffs
6	FC Cincinnati	32	12	10	10	46	48	−2	46	Conference Playoffs
7	New York Red Bulls II	32	13	5	14	57	60	−3	44	Conference Playoffs
8	Bethlehem Steel FC	32	12	8	12	46	45	+1	44	Conference Playoffs
9	Orlando City B	32	10	12	10	37	36	+1	42	
10	Ottawa Fury	32	8	14	10	42	41	+1	38	
11	Harrisburg City Islanders	32	10	7	15	28	47	−19	37	
12	Saint Louis FC	32	9	9	14	35	48	−13	36	
13	Pittsburgh Riverhounds	32	8	12	12	33	42	−9	36	
14	Richmond Kickers	32	8	8	16	24	36	−12	32	
15	Toronto FC II	32	6	7	19	27	54	−27	25	

Source: 2017 USL standings
Rules for classification: 1) total wins; 2) total goal differential; 3) total goals scored; 4) points earned against top four Conference finishers; 5) disciplinary points; 6) coin toss or drawing of lots
(C) Champions

==== Results ====
All times in Eastern Time.

April 1 1	Bethlehem Steel FC	2–3	Rochester Rhinos	Bethlehem, Pennsylvania
4:00 PM	Davies 45+3' (pen.); Conneh 72' (pen.)	Report; Box Score	Madison 9'; Fall 34'; Graf 88'	Stadium: Goodman Stadium; Attendance: 3,102; Referee: Jorge Ramírez

April 9 2	Bethlehem Steel FC	2–0	FC Cincinnati	Bethlehem, Pennsylvania
4:00 PM	Burke (yellow card) 29'; McKenzie (yellow card) 34'; Jones (yellow card) 45+2'; Conneh 47', 60'	Report; Box Score	Nicholson (red card) 23'	Stadium: Goodman Stadium; Attendance: 3,005; Referee: Jorge Gonzalez

April 15 3	Harrisburg City Islanders	3–2	Bethlehem Steel FC	Harrisburg, Pennsylvania
7:00 PM	Wheeler 9'; Wilson 21'; Thomas (yellow card) 72'; Benbow 90'	Report; Box Score	Moar 38'; Wijnaldum (yellow card) 61'; Nanco 64'	Stadium: FNB Field; Attendance: 3,264; Referee: Brandon Smith

April 23 4	Bethlehem Steel FC	0–2	Orlando City B	Bethlehem, Pennsylvania
4:00 PM	Trusty (yellow card) 45+2'; Burke (yellow card) 47'; Jones (yellow card) 68'; Wijnaldum (yellow card) 70'	Report; Box Score	Laryea (yellow card) 38' (goal) 49', 71'; Ellis-Hayden (yellow card) 87'	Stadium: Goodman Stadium; Attendance: 2,976; Referee: Henrik Karlsson

April 29 5	Bethlehem Steel FC	1–0	FC Cincinnati	Bethlehem, Pennsylvania
5:00 PM	Conneh (yellow card) 42'; Wijnaldum (yellow card) 59'; Moar (yellow card) 79'; Roberts 87'	Report; Box Score	Walker (yellow card) 61'; Polak (yellow card) 85'; Craven (red card) 90+5'	Stadium: Goodman Stadium; Attendance: 3,086; Referee: Danielle Chesky

May 6 6	Charleston Battery	1–0	Bethlehem Steel FC	Charleston, South Carolina
7:00 PM	Guerra 17'; Hackshaw (yellow card) 22'; Cordoves (yellow card) 69'	Report; Box Score	Trusty (yellow card) 55'	Stadium: MUSC Health Stadium; Attendance: 2,820; Referee: Kevin Broadley

May 13 7	Toronto FC II	0–1	Bethlehem Steel FC	Vaughan, Ontario
6:00 PM	Burke 8' (pen.); Nanco (yellow card) 66'	Report; Box Score		Stadium: Ontario Soccer Centre; Attendance: 3,033; Referee: Pierre-Luc Lauziere

May 20 8	FC Cincinnati	2–1	Bethlehem Steel FC	Cincinnati, Ohio
6:00 PM	Konig 18', 52'; Fordyce (yellow card) 43'; Quinn (yellow card) 86'	Report; Box Score	Conneh 33' (yellow card) 47'; Nanco (yellow card) 45+2'; Tribbett (yellow card) 64'; Brown (yellow card) 90'	Stadium: Nippert Stadium; Attendance: 18,441; Referee: Malik Badawi

May 25 9	Bethlehem Steel FC	0–1	Charleston Battery	Bethlehem, Pennsylvania
11:00 AM	Monge (yellow card) 77'; Burke (yellow card) 88'	Report; Box Score	Williams 77'	Stadium: Goodman Stadium; Attendance: 2,971; Referee: Jonathan Weiner

May 28 10	Bethlehem Steel FC	3–1	Harrisburg City Islanders	Bethlehem, Pennsylvania
5:00 PM	Chambers 39'; Conneh 49'; Real (yellow card) 79'; Burke (yellow card) 82' (goal) 90+3' (pen.)	Report; Box Score	DiPrima 80'	Stadium: Goodman Stadium; Attendance: 3,066; Referee: Lorant Varga

June 4 11	Bethlehem Steel FC	1–1	Ottawa Fury FC	Bethlehem, Pennsylvania
17:00	Jones (yellow card) 4'; Conneh 28'; Tribbett (yellow card) 87'	Report; Box Score	Obasi (yellow card) 1'; Barden (yellow card) 34'; Salazar 70'	Stadium: Goodman Stadium; Attendance: 2,988; Referee: (United States) Mark Kadlecik

June 11 12	Saint Louis FC	1–2	Bethlehem Steel FC	Fenton, Missouri
17:00	Tribbett 3' (o.g.); Alihodžić (yellow card) 31'; Stojkov (yellow card) 50'; Plewa (yellow card) 53'; Cabalceta (yellow card) 86'	Report; Box Score	Jones (yellow card) 42'; Conneh 56'; Chambers (yellow card) 68' (goal) 74'	Stadium: Marshall Wireless Stadium; Attendance: 4,016; Referee: Lukasz Szpala

June 16 13	New York Red Bulls II	0–2	Bethlehem Steel FC	Montclair, New Jersey
19:00	Metzger (yellow card) 26'; Ndam (yellow card) 76'	Report; Box Score	Najem 5'; Conneh (yellow card) 30'; Moar 57'; McGuire (yellow card) 90+1'; Samuel (yellow card) 90+3'	Stadium: MSU Soccer Park at Pittser Field; Attendance: 495; Referee: Luis Arroyo

June 20 14	Harrisburg City Islanders	0–1	Bethlehem Steel FC	Harrisburg, Pennsylvania
19:00	Chambers 54'; Wijnaldum (yellow card) 76'	Report; Box Score	Nishanian (red card) 80'	Stadium: FNB Field; Attendance: 2,314; Referee: Jorge Ramírez

July 1 15	Bethlehem Steel FC	1–1	Richmond Kickers	Bethlehem, Pennsylvania
18:30	Jones 51'; Burke (yellow card) 65' (yellow-red card) 90+5'; Roberts (red card) 66'; Trusty (yellow card) 90+1'	Report; Box Score	Fernando 40'; Troyer (yellow card) 45'; Jane (yellow card) 54'	Stadium: Goodman Stadium; Attendance: 3,006; Referee: Andrew Musashe

July 9 16	Bethlehem Steel FC	2–0	New York Red Bulls II	Bethlehem, Pennsylvania
19:00	Nanco 17' (yellow card) 66'; Herbers 31' (yellow card) 32'; Brown (yellow card) 72'	Report; Box Score	Etienne (yellow card) 34'; Basuljevic (yellow card) 76'	Stadium: Goodman Stadium; Attendance: 3,215; Referee: Gustavo Solorio

July 15 17	Bethlehem Steel FC	1–1	Pittsburgh Riverhounds	Bethlehem, Pennsylvania
18:00	Chambers 27' (pen.); Moar (yellow card) 36'	Report; Box Score	Walsh 24'; Jack (yellow card) 34'; Earls (yellow card) 43'; Victor Souto (yellow card) 76'	Stadium: Goodman Stadium; Referee: (United States) Lorant Varga

July 22 18	Richmond Kickers	3–2	Bethlehem Steel FC	Richmond, Virginia
19:45	Oliver 46' (yellow card) 58'; Fernando 47'; Asante 87'; Wyatt (yellow card) 90+2'	Report; Box Score	Jones 39'; Tribbett 69'; Marquez (yellow card) 76'	Stadium: City Stadium; Attendance: 2,921; Referee: Danielle Chesky

July 29 19	Bethlehem Steel FC	0–4	Charlotte Independence	Bethlehem, Pennsylvania
17:00	Chambers (yellow card) 49'; Fontana (yellow card) 51'; Nanco (yellow card) 65'; Jones (red card) 73'	Report; Box Score	Hilton 7', 48'; Herrera 19'; Johnson (yellow card) 32'; Martínez (yellow card) 45+2' (goal) 80'; Mizell (yellow card) 72'; Duckett (yellow card) 90+2'	Stadium: Goodman Stadium; Attendance: 3,210; Referee: Henrik Karlsson

August 5 20	Ottawa Fury FC	1–2	Bethlehem Steel FC	Ottawa, Ontario
19:00	Trusty 7' (o.g.); Bruna (yellow card) 36'; Irving (yellow card) 52'; McEleney (yellow card) 84'	Report; Box Score	Real (yellow card) 42'; Nanco 66'; Fontana (yellow card) 68'; Moar 81'; Trusty (yellow card) 90+2'	Stadium: TD Place Stadium; Attendance: 4,630; Referee: David Barrie

August 13 21	Bethlehem Steel FC	3–1	Toronto FC II	Bethlehem, Pennsylvania
17:00	Real (yellow card) 28'; Burke (yellow card) 55' (goal) 58'; Tribbett (yellow card) 57'; Jones (yellow card) 76'; Chambers 78' (pen.); Nanco 90+2'	Report; Box Score	McCrary (yellow card) 28'; Dunn-Johnson (yellow card) 50' (yellow-red card) 79'; Taintor 73' (pen.)	Stadium: Goodman Stadium; Attendance: 3,072; Referee: Kevin Broadley

August 16 22	Charlotte Independence	1–0	Bethlehem Steel FC	Matthews, North Carolina
19:00	Martínez 33'; Ross (yellow card) 53'; Smith (yellow card) 74'	Report; Box Score	Chambers (yellow card) 15'	Stadium: Mecklenburg County Sportsplex; Attendance: 1,312; Referee: Ismir Pekmic

August 20 23	Bethlehem Steel FC	1–3	Louisville City FC	Bethlehem, Pennsylvania
17:00	Marquez 41'; Fontana (yellow card) 60'; Samuel (yellow card) 90+4'	Report; Box Score	Spencer 17', 26'; Abend (yellow card) 64'; Lancaster 84'; Smith (red card) 90+4'	Stadium: Goodman Stadium; Attendance: 3,147; Referee: Luis Arroyo

August 26 24	Pittsburgh Riverhounds	3–2	Bethlehem Steel FC	Pittsburgh, Pennsylvania
19:00	Hertzog 10' (yellow card) 45'; Jack 19' (yellow card) 44'; Adewole (yellow card) 33'; Walsh (yellow card) 45+1'; Kerr 75'	Report; Box Score	Moar (yellow card) 21'; Burke 42', 71'; Real (yellow card) 89'; Fontana (yellow card) 89'	Stadium: Highmark Stadium; Attendance: 2,736; Referee: Tori Penso

August 31 25	Orlando City B	1–1	Bethlehem Steel FC	Orlando, Florida
19:30	Alston (yellow card) 30'; Da Silva (yellow card) 45+1' (goal) 75'	Box Score	Epps 86'; Chambers (yellow card) 90+1'	Stadium: Orlando City Stadium; Attendance: 856; Referee: Daniel Gutierrez

September 15 26	Louisville City FC	2–2	Bethlehem Steel FC	Louisville, Kentucky
19:30	Craig (yellow card) 46'; Smith 55' (pen.); Jimenez 76' (yellow card) 85'	Report; Box Score	Burke 21' (pen.) (yellow card) 30'; Moar 60'; Chambers (yellow card) 70'; Real (yellow card) 88'; Najem (yellow card) 90'	Stadium: Louisville Slugger Field; Attendance: 8,303; Referee: Lorant Varga

September 24 27	Bethlehem Steel FC	3–2	Pittsburgh Riverhounds	Bethlehem, Pennsylvania
15:00	Najem 5'; Burke 8', 37'; Trusty (yellow card) 29'	Report; Box Score	Okai (yellow card) 34'; Jack (yellow card) 36'; Hertzog 40' (pen.), 64'	Stadium: Goodman Stadium; Attendance: 3,112; Referee: Bardhyl Pashaj

September 27 28	Bethlehem Steel FC	2–2	Tampa Bay Rowdies	Bethlehem, Pennsylvania
15:00	Moar (yellow card) 19'; Burke (yellow card) 38' (goal) 46'; Jones (yellow card) 55'; Trusty (yellow card) 65'; Conneh 78'	Report; Box Score	Hristov (yellow card) 18' (goal) 36' (pen.); Gorskie 55'; King (yellow card) 90'	Stadium: Goodman Stadium; Attendance: 2,881; Referee: Jared Simons

September 30 29	Tampa Bay Rowdies	1–1	Bethlehem Steel FC	St. Petersburg, Florida
19:30	Gorskie (yellow card) 29'; Cole (yellow card) 62'; Guenzatti 80'; Restrepo (yellow card) 90+4'	Report; Box Score	Heard (yellow card) 26'; Conneh 56'; Samuel (yellow card) 58'; Jones (yellow card) 74'; McGuire (yellow card) 89'; Roberts (yellow card) 90+4'; Burke (yellow card) 90+6'	Stadium: Al Lang Stadium; Attendance: 6,611; Referee: Guido Gonzalez Jr.

October 6 30	Toronto FC II	2–4	Bethlehem Steel FC	Vaughan, Ontario
19:30	Hundal 61', 88'	Report; Box Score	Moar 19', 22'; Jones 53'; Conneh 81'	Stadium: Ontario Soccer Centre; Attendance: 647; Referee: David Barrie

October 10 31	Rochester Rhinos	1–0	Bethlehem Steel FC	Rochester, New York
19:05	Graf 38'	Report; Box Score	Conneh (yellow card) 86'	Stadium: Capelli Sport Stadium; Attendance: 963; Referee: Thomas Snyder

October 15 32	Bethlehem Steel FC	1–1	Saint Louis FC	Bethlehem, Pennsylvania
15:00	Aaronson (yellow card) 6'; Real 35'; Chambers (yellow card) 54'; Moar (yellow card) 80'; Burke (yellow card) 90+2'	Report; Box Score	Dalgaard 34'; Plewa (yellow card) 46'; Mirkovic (yellow card) 64'; Rudolph (yellow card) 78'	Stadium: Goodman Stadium; Attendance: 3,010; Referee: Greg Dopka

=== Results summary ===
Overall								Home						Away					
Pld	Pts	W	L	T	GF	GA	GD	W	L	T	GF	GA	GD	W	L	T	GF	GA	GD
32	44	12	12	8	46	45	+1	6	5	5	23	23	0	6	7	3	23	22	+1

Last updated: October 28, 2017
Source: 2017 USL season
Pld = Matches played; Pts = Points; W = Matches won; T = Matches tied; L = Matches lost; GF = Goals for; GA = Goals against; GD = Goal difference

Round	1	2	3	4	5	6	7	8	9	10	11	12	13	14	15	16	17	18	19	20	21	22	23	24	25	26	27	28	29	30	31	32
Stadium	H	H	A	H	H	A	A	A	H	H	H	A	A	A	H	H	H	A	H	A	H	A	H	A	A	H	A	H	A	A	A	H
Result	L	W	L	L	W	L	W	L	L	W	D	W	W	W	D	W	D	L	L	W	W	L	L	L	D	D	W	D	D	W	L	D
Position	11	10	12	15	11	13	9	9	13	7	11	6	5	4	4	5	5	6	7	7	6	6	6	8	9	9	8	7	9	8	8	8

Updated to match(es) played on October 28, 2017. Source: 2017 USL season and Current USL Standing
A = Away; H = Home; W = Win; D = Draw; L = Loss

=== USL Playoffs ===
Bethlehem Steel FC earned the final playoff spot during the 2017 USL season for the first time in the club's history. Finishing as the 8th seed, Steel FC's first round fixture was away at conference winning Louisville City FC.

All times in Eastern Time.

October 20 First Round	Louisville City FC	4–0	Bethlehem Steel FC	Bethlehem, Pennsylvania
7:30 PM	Morad 14', 31'; Spencer 70'; Ownby 79'	Report; Box Score	Real (yellow card) 57'; Burke (yellow card) 63'; Conneh (yellow card) 75'; Jones (yellow card) 87'	Stadium: Goodman Stadium; Attendance: 6,378; Referee: Marcos de Oliveira

== Statistics ==
As of October 28, 2017.

Players included in matchday squads
No.	Pos.	Nat.	Name	League		Playoffs		Total		Discipline	
No.	Pos.	Nat.	Name	Apps	Goals	Apps	Goals	Apps	Goals	A yellow rectangle, denoting the yellow penalty card shown to a player being cautioned	A red rectangle, denoting the red penalty card shown to a player being sent off
3	DF	(England)	Jack Elliott	1	0	0	0	1	0	0	0
4	DF	(United States)	Ken Tribbett	12	1	0	0	12	1	3	0
7	MF	(United States)	Brian Carroll	2	0	0	0	2	0	0	0
8	MF	(United States)	Maurice Edu	3	0	0	0	3	0	0	0
9	FW	(United States)	Charlie Davies	1	1	0	0	1	1	0	0
12	DF	(United States)	Keegan Rosenberry	1	0	0	0	1	0	0	0
14	MF	(Germany)	Fabian Herbers	3	1	0	0	3	1	1	0
15	DF	(Ghana)	Josh Yaro	5	0	0	0	5	0	0	0
16	DF	(United States)	Richie Marquez	4	1	0	0	4	1	1	0
19	DF	(England)	Aaron Jones	29	2	1	0	30	2	5	1
20	MF	(United States)	Marcus Epps	13	1	0	0	13	1	0	0
21	MF	(Ghana)	Derrick Jones	12	1	1	0	13	1	4	0
24	MF	(United States)	Adam Najem	23	2	1	0	24	2	1	0
26	DF	(United States)	Auston Trusty	25	0	1	0	26	0	6	0
32	DF	(Netherlands)	Giliano Wijnaldum	7	0	0	0	7	0	4	0
36	FW	(Liberia)	Seku Conneh	26	10	1	0	27	10	6	0
37	FW	(Canada)	Chris Nanco	28	4	1	0	29	4	4	0
38	FW	(Spain)	Santi Moar	30	6	0	0	30	6	6	0
39	MF	(Jamaica)	Amoy Brown	3	0	0	0	3	0	2	0
40	MF	(Canada)	Josh Heard	16	0	1	0	17	0	1	0
41	FW	(Jamaica)	Cory Burke	25	9	1	0	26	9	10	1
42	DF	(United States)	Hugh Roberts	26	1	1	0	27	1	1	1
43	MF	(Norway)	Chris Wingate	6	0	0	0	6	0	0	0
44	DF	(United States)	Charlie Reymann	9	0	0	0	9	0	0	0
45	MF	(Republic of Ireland)	James Chambers	28	5	1	0	29	5	6	0
47	DF	(United States)	Matthew Real	18	1	1	0	19	1	6	0
48	DF	(United States)	Matt Mahoney	9	0	0	0	9	0	0	0
49	MF	(United States)	Yosef Samuel	21	0	1	0	22	0	3	0
50	DF	(United States)	Mark McKenzie‡	6	0	0	0	6	0	1	0
52	FW	(United States)	Issa Rayyan‡	1	0	0	0	1	0	0	0
53	FW	(United States)	Tiger Graham‡	1	0	0	0	1	0	0	0
55	MF	(United States)	Dawson McCartney‡	3	0	0	0	3	0	0	0
56	MF	(United States)	Seth Kuhn‡	1	0	0	0	1	0	0	0
57	MF	(United States)	Justin McMaster‡	1	0	0	0	1	0	0	0
59	MF	(United States)	Anthony Fontana‡	11	0	0	0	11	0	4	0
60	MF	(United States)	Josue Monge‡	3	0	0	0	3	0	1	0
63	MF	(United States)	Brenden Aaronson‡	6	0	1	0	7	0	1	0
68	MF	(United States)	Michael Pellegrino‡	2	0	0	0	2	0	0	0
Total									46	77	3

=== Goalkeepers ===
As of October 28, 2017.

Players included in matchday squads
Nat.	No.	Player	Apps	Starts	Record	GA	GAA	SO	Booked	Sent off (straight red)
(United States)	23	John McCarthy	3	3	1-1-1	3	1.00	1	0	0
(United States)	29	Jake McGuire	23	23	10-6-5	26	1.13	5	2	0
(United States)	46	Matt Perrella†	0	0	0-0-0	0	0.00	0	0	0
(United States)	64	Tomas Romero‡	7	7	1-5-1	16	2.29	0	0	0
Total					12-12-7	45	1.45	6	2	0

Players with names in italics were on loan from Philadelphia Union for individual matches with Bethlehem.
Players with names marked ‡ were academy call-ups from Philadelphia Union Academy for individual matches with Bethlehem.
Players with names marked * were on loan from another club for the whole of their season with Bethlehem.
Players with names marked † were transferred/released from the club midseason.
League denotes USL regular season
Playoffs denotes USL Playoffs

== Honors ==
- Week 3 Player of the Week: F Seku Conneh
  Honorable Mention: M Santi Moar
- Week 6 Team of the Week: D Hugh Roberts
- Week 8 Team of the Week: G Jake McGuire
- Week 9 Save of the Week: G Jake McGuire
- Week 10 Team of the Week Honorable Mention: F Cory Burke
- Week 11 Team of the Week Honorable Mention: F Seku Conneh
- Week 12 Team of the Week Honorable Mention: F Seku Conneh
- Week 13 Player of the Week: M Adam Najem
  Honorable Mention: D Auston Trusty
- Week 15 Team of the Week Honorable Mention: D Aaron Jones
- Week 20 Team of the Week: M Chris Nanco
- Week 21 Team of the Week Honorable Mention: F Cory Burke
- Week 24 Team of the Week Honorable Mention: M Marcus Epps
- Week 27 Team of the Week: F Cory Burke
- Week 28 Team of the Week Honorable Mention: F Seku Conneh
- Week 29 Team of the Week: M Santi Moar
