= 2016 Bethlehem Steel FC season =

Bethlehem Steel FC
2016 season
- Ownership Group: Keystone S&E
- Head coach: Brendan Burke
- Stadium: Goodman Stadium
- USL: 11th Place
- USL Playoffs: Did not qualify
- Top goalscorer: League: Ryan Richter (5); Derrick Jones (5); All: Ryan Richter (5); Derrick Jones (5)
- Highest home attendance: 3,664 (Jul. 10 vs. Pittsburgh)
- Lowest home attendance: 1,008 (Jul. 14 vs. Wilmington)
- Average home league attendance: League: 2,498
Home colors	Away colors

The 2016 season was Bethlehem Steel FC's inaugural season of competitive soccer – its first season in the third division of American soccer and its first season in the United Soccer League. Steel FC competed in the league's Eastern Conference.

== Roster ==
Note: Flags indicate national team as defined under FIFA eligibility rules; some limited exceptions apply. Players may hold more than one non-FIFA nationality. Squad correct as of October 1, 2016.

No.	Pos.	Nation	Player
3	DF	USA	Taylor Washington (on loan from Philadelphia Union)
4	DF	USA	Ken Tribbett (on loan from Philadelphia Union)
8	MF	USA	Maurice Edu (on loan from Philadelphia Union)
11	FW	GER	Fabian Herbers (on loan from Philadelphia Union)
14	MF	CMR	Eric Ayuk (on loan from Philadelphia Union)
19	MF	USA	Cole Missimo (on loan from Philadelphia Union)
20	MF	COL	Wálter Restrepo (on loan from Philadelphia Union)
22	MF	BRA	Leo Fernandes (on loan from Philadelphia Union)
23	DF	BRA	Anderson Conceição (on loan from Philadelphia Union)
24	GK	ENG	Matt Jones (on loan from Philadelphia Union)
27	GK	USA	John McCarthy (on loan from Philadelphia Union)
32	GK	USA	Samir Badr (released)
34	DF	USA	Mickey Daly (transferred to Carolina Railhawks)
35	MF	GHA	Derrick Jones (on loan from Philadelphia Union)
36	FW	LBR	Seku Conneh
37	FW	LBR	Gabe Gissie
38	DF	USA	Nick Bibbs
39	FW	JAM	Amoy Brown
40	MF	CAN	Josh Heard
41	FW	JAM	Cory Burke (on loan from Rivoli United)
42	MF	NGA	Bolu Akinyode
43	FW	USA	Jamie Luchini
44	DF	USA	Ryan Richter (transferred to New York Cosmos)
45	MF	IRL	James Chambers
46	GK	USA	Matt Perrella (Academy call-up)
47	MF	BRA	Fred
48	DF	USA	Auston Trusty (on loan from Philadelphia Union)
49	MF	USA	Yosef Samuel
50	DF	USA	Mark McKenzie (Academy call-up)
51	MF	GUI	Lamine Conte (Academy call-up)
52	MF	USA	Joseph DeZart (Academy call-up)
53	FW	CAN	Raheem Taylor-Parkes (Academy call-up)
54	DF	USA	Matthew Real (Academy call-up)
57	FW	USA	Justin McMaster (Academy call-up)
59	MF	USA	Anthony Fontana (Academy call-up)
60	MF	CRC	Josue Monge (Academy call-up)
61	GK	USA	Tomas Romero (Academy call-up)
62	GK	USA	Kris Shakes (Academy call-up)
63	FW	USA	Issa Rayyan (Academy call-up)

== Transfers ==
=== In ===
Date	Player	Number	Position	Previous club	Fee/notes
December 3, 2015	(Ghana) Derrick Jones	35	MF	(United States) Philadelphia Union Academy	Academy Signing
December 11, 2015	(Nigeria) Bolu Akinyode	42	MF	(United States) New York Red Bulls II	Undisclosed
December 11, 2015	(United States) Mickey Daly	34	DF	(United States) Sacramento Republic FC	Undisclosed
December 11, 2015	(Liberia) Gabe Gissie	37	FW	(United States) Sacramento Republic FC	Undisclosed
December 22, 2015	(United States) Ryan Richter	44	DF	(Canada) Ottawa Fury FC	Undisclosed
January 8, 2016	(United States) Samir Badr	32	GK	(United States) Colorado Springs Switchbacks FC	Undisclosed
January 29, 2016	(United States) Ken Tribbett	-	DF	(United States) Harrisburg City Islanders	Undisclosed
January 29, 2016	(United States) Nick Bibbs	38	DF	(United States) Saint Louis FC	Undisclosed
January 29, 2016	(Jamaica) Amoy Brown	39	FW	(Jamaica) St George's College	Undisclosed
January 29, 2016	(Republic of Ireland) James Chambers	45	MF	(Republic of Ireland) St. Patrick's Athletic	Undisclosed
January 29, 2016	(Liberia) Seku Conneh	36	FW	(Netherlands) FC Oss	Undisclosed
January 29, 2016	(Canada) Josh Heard	40	MF	(United States) Washington Huskies	Free
January 29, 2016	(United States) Raymond Lee	-	DF	(United States) Philadelphia Union	Free
March 24, 2016	(Brazil) Fred	47	DF	(United States) Philadelphia Union	Signed as player/coach
April 6, 2016	(United States) Jamie Luchini	43	FW	(United States) Lehigh Mountain Hawks	Free

=== Out ===
Date	Player	Number	Position	New club	Fee/notes
February 23, 2016	(United States) Ken Tribbett	-	DF	(United States) Philadelphia Union	First team selection
March 24, 2016	(United States) Raymond Lee	-	DF	(United States) Tulsa Roughnecks FC	Released
July 27, 2016	(Ghana) Derrick Jones	21	MF	(United States) Philadelphia Union	Signed to first team as a Homegrown Player
August 10, 2016	(United States) Auston Trusty	26	DF	(United States) Philadelphia Union	Signed to first team as a Homegrown Player
August 24, 2016	(United States) Mickey Daly	34	DF	(United States) Carolina Railhawks	Rights traded for loan and transfer fee
September 8, 2016	(United States) Samir Badr	32	GK	—N/a	Released
September 20, 2016	(United States) Ryan Richter	44	DF	(United States) New York Cosmos	Transfer

=== Loan in ===
Date	Player	Number	Position	Loaned from	Fee/notes
January 29, 2016	(Jamaica) Cory Burke	41	FW	(Jamaica) Rivoli United	Undisclosed
March 24, 2016	(Ghana) Joshua Yaro	3	DF	(United States) Philadelphia Union	Short-term loan
March 24, 2016	(Germany) Fabian Herbers	11	FW	(United States) Philadelphia Union	Short-term loan
March 24, 2016	(Cameroon) Eric Ayuk	14	MF	(United States) Philadelphia Union	Short-term loan
March 24, 2016	(Colombia) Wálter Restrepo	20	MF	(United States) Philadelphia Union	Short-term loan
March 24, 2016	(Brazil) Leo Fernandes	22	MF	(United States) Philadelphia Union	Short-term loan
March 24, 2016	(United States) John McCarthy	27	GK	(United States) Philadelphia Union	Short-term loan
April 3, 2016	(United States) Auston Trusty	49	DF	(United States) Philadelphia Union Academy	Academy Call-up
April 3, 2016	(United States) Mark McKenzie	50	DF	(United States) Philadelphia Union Academy	Academy Call-up
May 15, 2016	(England) Matt Jones	24	GK	(United States) Philadelphia Union	Short-term loan
May 22, 2016	(United States) Ken Tribbett	4	DF	(United States) Philadelphia Union	Short-term loan
August 7, 2016	(Ghana) Derrick Jones	21	MF	(United States) Philadelphia Union	Short-term loan
September 3, 2016	(United States) Maurice Edu	8	MF	(United States) Philadelphia Union	Short-term loan

=== Loan out ===
Date	Player	Number	Position	Loaned to	Fee/notes
July 22, 2016	(United States) Michael Daly	34	DF	(United States) Carolina RailHawks	One month with option to buy

== Competitions ==
Bethlehem Steel FC compete in USL, which is the third tier of the American soccer pyramid. Steel FC's affiliation with the Philadelphia Union of MLS has prevented the team from participating in the U.S. Open Cup competition. The decision to make affiliated "farm teams" ineligible for the U.S. Open Cup was decided for the 2016 iteration of the tournament.

=== Preseason ===
March 6, 2016 Preseason	Bethlehem Steel FC	5–0	Syracuse Orange	Chester, Pennsylvania
9:00 a.m. EDT	Burke; Diallo; Gissie; Luchini	Report		Stadium: Philadelphia Union training facility

March 8, 2016 Preseason	Villanova Wildcats	3–2	Bethlehem Steel FC	Philadelphia
		Report

March 11, 2016 Preseason	New York Red Bulls II	1–1	Bethlehem Steel FC	Hanover, New Jersey
9:00 a.m. EDT	Powder 74'	Report	Ayuk 75'	Stadium: New York Red Bulls training facility

March 15, 2016 Preseason	Bethlehem Steel FC	1–0	Harrisburg City Islanders	Bethlehem, Pennsylvania
12:00 p.m. EDT	Brown 90'	Report		Stadium: Goodman Stadium

March 19, 2016 Preseason	Penn State Nittany Lions	2–1	Bethlehem Steel FC	State College, Pennsylvania
12:00 p.m. EDT				Stadium: Penn State Practice Fields

March 20, 2016 Preseason	Bethlehem Steel FC	3–0	Georgetown Hoyas	Chester, Pennsylvania
11:00 a.m. EDT	Brown; Richter; Jones	Report		Stadium: Philadelphia Union Training facility

=== USL regular season ===
The 2016 USL season will be contested by 29 teams, 14 of which compete in the league's Eastern Conference. All teams will play a regular season total of 30 matches between teams within their respective conference. At the conclusion of the regular season, the top eight teams from each conference advance to the 2016 USL Playoffs for a chance to compete for the USL Championship Title.

==== Standings (Eastern Conference) ====
Pos	Team	Pld	W	D	L	GF	GA	GD	Pts
9	Wilmington Hammerheads FC	30	8	10	12	37	47	−10	34
10	Harrisburg City Islanders	30	8	7	15	37	54	−17	31
11	Bethlehem Steel FC	30	6	10	14	32	43	−11	28
12	Toronto FC II	30	7	5	18	36	58	−22	26
13	Pittsburgh Riverhounds	30	6	7	17	31	50	−19	25

Source: 2016 USL Standings
Rules for classification: 1) total wins; 2) total goal differential; 3) total goals scored; 4) points earned against top four Conference finishers; 5) disciplinary points; 6) coin toss or drawing of lots

==== Results ====
All times in Eastern Time.

March 25, 2016 1	FC Montreal	0–1	Bethlehem Steel FC	Montreal, Quebec
7:00 p.m. EDT	Mkungilwa (yellow card) 35'; Lefèvre (yellow card) 44'; Charbonneau (yellow card) 73'	Report; Box Score	Daly (yellow card) 40'; Herbers 43'; Chambers (yellow card) 75'	Stadium: Stade Olympique; Attendance: 966

April 3, 2016 2	Bethlehem Steel FC	1–2	FC Cincinnati	Bethlehem, Pennsylvania
3:00 p.m. EDT	Akinyode (yellow card) 69' (yellow-red card) 80'; Ayuk 90'	Report; Box Score	Wiedeman 25'; Okoli 35'; Walker (yellow card) 40'; Hoppenot (yellow card) 80'	Stadium: Goodman Stadium; Attendance: 3,655

April 10, 2016 3	New York Red Bulls II	4–0	Bethlehem Steel FC	Harrison, New Jersey
3:00 p.m. EDT	Yaro 1' (o.g.); Muyl 3'; Abang 42'; Metzger (yellow card) 54'; Etienne 71'	Report; Box Score	Chambers (yellow card) 22' (yellow-red card) 90+1'	Stadium: Red Bull Arena

April 17, 2016 4	Bethlehem Steel FC	2–1	Richmond Kickers	Bethlehem, Pennsylvania
3:00 p.m. EDT	Ayuk 21'; Jones 46'	Report; Box Score	Imura 50'	Stadium: Goodman Stadium; Attendance: 2,417

April 24, 2016 5	Bethlehem Steel FC	0–0	Charleston Battery	Bethlehem, Pennsylvania
3:00 p.m. EDT		Report; Box Score		Stadium: Goodman Stadium; Attendance: 2,640

May 1, 2016 6	Bethlehem Steel FC	0–0	Louisville City FC	Bethlehem, Pennsylvania
3:00 p.m. EDT		Report; Box Score		Stadium: Goodman Stadium; Attendance: 2,018

May 7, 2016 7	Orlando City B	2–2	Bethlehem Steel FC	Melbourne, Florida
7:30 p.m. EDT	Turner 17'; Donovan (yellow card) 34'; Cox 54'; Boden (yellow card) 65'	Report; Box Score	Rocha 12' (o.g.); Herbers 14'; Daly (yellow card) 32'; Restrepo (red card) 50'; Chambers (yellow card) 87'; Missimo (yellow card) 90'	Stadium: Titan Soccer Complex; Attendance: 928; Referee: Neil Barbulescu

May 15, 2016 8	Bethlehem Steel FC	2–1	FC Montreal	Bethlehem, Pennsylvania
4:00 p.m. EDT	Richter 78' (pen.); Jones 84' (pen.)	Report; Box Score	Choinière 26'; Tabla (yellow card) 50'; Pantemis (yellow card) 69'; Fisher (yellow card) 75'	Stadium: Goodman Stadium; Attendance: 2,871

May 22, 2016 9	Harrisburg City Islanders	3–1	Bethlehem Steel FC	Lancaster, Pennsylvania
6:00 p.m. EDT	Wheeler 14', 15'; Barril (yellow card) 45'; Warshaw 63'	Report; Box Score	Bolduc 17'; Missimo (yellow card) 28'; Chambers (yellow card) 80'; Washington (yellow card) 87'	Stadium: Clipper Magazine Stadium; Attendance: 1,434; Referee: Margaret Domka

May 28, 2016 10	Rochester Rhinos	2–2	Bethlehem Steel FC	Rochester, New York
6:00 p.m. EDT	Farrell 13', 90+4' (yellow card) 69'; Volesky (yellow card) 27'	Report; Box Score	Richter 24' (pen.); Chambers (yellow card) 27'; Daly 58'; Fred (yellow card) 90'	Stadium: Rochester Rhinos Stadium

June 5, 2016 11	Bethlehem Steel FC	0–1	New York Red Bulls II	Bethlehem, Pennsylvania
4:00 p.m. EDT	Trusty (yellow card) 6'; Daly (yellow card) 58'	Report	Allen 4'; Plewa (yellow card) 52'; Muyl (yellow card) 57'; Carroll (yellow card) 70'; Meara (yellow card) 90+2'	Stadium: Goodman Stadium; Attendance: 3,569; Referee: Jon Freemon

June 10, 2016 12	Charlotte Independence	0–1	Bethlehem Steel FC	Charlotte, North Carolina
7:00 p.m. EDT	Calvert (yellow card) 80'	Report; Box Score	Burke 11' (yellow card) 68'	Stadium: Ramblewood Soccer Complex; Attendance: 1,319; Referee: Rubiel Vazquez

June 17, 2016 13	Wilmington Hammerheads FC	1–1	Bethlehem Steel FC	Wilmington, North Carolina
7:00 p.m. EDT	Fairclough 48'; Townsend (yellow card) 63'	Report; Box Score	Conneh 19'; Akinyode (yellow card) 57'; Jones (yellow card) 89'	Stadium: Legion Stadium; Attendance: 2,901; Referee: Jorge Ramirez

June 25, 2016 14	Richmond Kickers	0–0	Bethlehem Steel FC	Richmond, Virginia
7:00 p.m. EDT	Troyer (yellow card) 51'; Sekyere (yellow card) 60'	Report; Box Score	Jones (yellow card) 61'	Stadium: City Stadium; Attendance: 3,982; Referee: Matthew Franz

July 2, 2016 15	FC Cincinnati	1–0	Bethlehem Steel FC	Cincinnati, Ohio
6:00 p.m. EDT	McLaughlin 70'	Report; Box Score	Heard (yellow card) 48'; Daly (yellow card) 59'; Anderson (yellow card) 63'	Stadium: Nippert Stadium; Attendance: 17,380; Referee: Michael Lavergne

July 6, 2016 16	Toronto FC II	3–2	Bethlehem Steel FC	Vaughan, Ontario
7:30 p.m. EDT	Uccello 2'; Jobe 13' (yellow card) 90'; Fraser 63'	Report; Box Score	Richter 39'; Heard 66'; Taylor-Parkes (yellow card) 82'	Stadium: Ontario Soccer Centre; Attendance: 1,064; Referee: Matthew Kreitzer

July 10, 2016 17	Bethlehem Steel FC	2–0	Pittsburgh Riverhounds	Bethlehem, Pennsylvania
4:00 p.m. EDT	Burke 24'; Jones (yellow card) 70'; Washington (yellow card) 85'; Gissie (yellow card) 87'; Fernandes 90+2' (pen.)	Report; Box Score	Adeleye (yellow card) 59'; Branson (yellow card) 85'	Stadium: Goodman Stadium; Attendance: 3,664; Referee: Matthew Kreitzer

July 14, 2016 18	Bethlehem Steel FC	3–0	Wilmington Hammerheads FC	Bethlehem, Pennsylvania
12:00 p.m. EDT	Heard 29'; Jones 42'; Gissie 54'; Conneh (yellow card) 66'	Report; Box Score	Defregger (yellow card) 29'; Miller (yellow card) 83'; Perone (yellow card) 90'	Stadium: Goodman Stadium; Attendance: 1,008; Referee: Brandon Artis

July 21, 2016 19	Bethlehem Steel FC	0–1	Harrisburg City Islanders	Bethlehem, Pennsylvania
4:00 p.m. EDT	Missimo (yellow card) 22'; Conceição (yellow card) 89'	Report; Box Score	Leverock (yellow card) 24'; Bolduc (yellow card) 29'; Jankouskas 74'; Benbow (yellow card) 79'	Stadium: Goodman Stadium; Attendance: 1,129; Referee: Elvis Mahmutovic

July 24, 2016 20	Bethlehem Steel FC	1–1	Rochester Rhinos	Bethlehem, Pennsylvania
4:00 p.m. EDT	Jones 20'; Conneh (yellow card) 45+4'; Burke (yellow card) 79'	Report; Box Score	Forbes 57'	Stadium: Goodman Stadium; Attendance: 1,996; Referee: Matthew Franz

July 31, 2016 21	Bethlehem Steel FC	2–3	Toronto FC II	Bethlehem, Pennsylvania
4:00 p.m. EDT	Bibbs 48'; Heard (yellow card) 53'; Richter 81' (pen.); Brown (yellow card) 85'	Report; Box Score	Hundal 17', 58'; Edwards (yellow card) 31'; Bernal (yellow card) 46'; Uccello 78'; Charpie (red card) 80'	Stadium: Goodman Stadium; Attendance: 2,176; Referee: Jamie Herrera

August 7, 2016 22	Bethlehem Steel FC	2–2	Charlotte Independence	Bethlehem, Pennsylvania
4:00 p.m. EDT	Conneh 22'; Chambers (yellow card) 25'; Trusty (yellow card) 35'; Richter 88' (pen.)	Report; Box Score	Metacalf (yellow card) 32'; Slogic (yellow card) 44'; Martinez 46'; Davidson 62'; Bernen (yellow card) 87'	Stadium: Goodman Stadium; Attendance: 2,358; Referee: Jose Carlos Rivero

August 13, 2016 23	Pittsburgh Riverhounds	2 - 1	Bethlehem Steel FC	Pittsburgh, Pennsylvania
7:00 p.m. EDT	Hertzog 18' (yellow card) 90'; Earls (yellow card) 23'; Kerr 62'	Report; Box Score	Burke 28'; Richter (yellow card) 37'; Chambers (yellow card) 66'; Conceição (yellow card) 90'	Stadium: Highmark Stadium; Referee: Charles Murphy

August 21, 2016 24	FC Montreal	3 - 2	Bethlehem Steel FC	Montreal, Quebec
3:00 p.m. EDT	Jimmy Shammar-Sanon (yellow card) 2'; Mkugilwa 14'; Dominguez (yellow card) 39'; Tabla 80'; Lincourt-Joseph 90'	Report; Box Score	Chambers 6' 50' (yellow card) 63'	Stadium: Complexe sportif Claude-Robillard; Attendance: 73

August 27, 2016 25	Louisville City FC	1–0	Bethlehem Steel FC	Louisville, Kentucky
7:30 p.m. EDT	Abend 15'	Report; Box Score	Conceição (yellow card) 15'; Burke (yellow card) 47'	Stadium: Louisville Slugger Field; Attendance: 6,788; Referee: Tony Crush

August 30, 2016 26	Harrisburg City Islanders	2–2	Bethlehem Steel FC	Harrisburg, Pennsylvania
7:00 p.m. EDT	Foster 43', 81'; McLaws (yellow card) 25'; Barril (yellow card) 29'; Leverock (yellow card) 77'; Thomas (yellow card) 86'	Report; Box Score	Ayuk 45'; Chambers 48'	Stadium: FNB Field; Attendance: 1,362

September 4, 2016 27	Bethlehem Steel FC	0–2	New York Red Bulls II	Bethlehem, Pennsylvania
3:00 p.m. EDT	Edu (yellow card) 30'; Heard (yellow card) 45'	Report; Box Score	Allen 32' (pen.) (yellow card) 58'; Valot (yellow card) 60'; Etienne 90'	Stadium: Goodman Stadium; Referee: Henrik Karlsson

September 10, 2016 28	Charleston Battery	2–1	Bethlehem Steel FC	Charleston, South Carolina
7:30 p.m. EDT	Chang 10'; Ferguson (yellow card) 34'; Guerra 39'; Woodbine (yellow card) 45'; Garbanzo (yellow card) 53'	Report; Box Score	Chambers (yellow card) 32'; Jones 35' (pen.); Burke (yellow card) 41'; Edu (yellow card) 43'; Washington (yellow card) 53'; Bibbs (yellow card) 71'	Stadium: MUSC Health Stadium

September 18, 2016 29	Bethlehem Steel FC	1–1	Pittsburgh Riverhounds	Bethlehem, Pennsylvania
3:00 p.m. EDT	Chambers 67'	Report; Box Score	Hertzog 8' (pen.)	Stadium: Goodman Stadium; Attendance: 2,947; Referee: Jorge Ramirez

September 24, 2016 30	Bethlehem Steel FC	0–2	Orlando City B	Bethlehem, Pennsylvania
3:00 p.m. EDT	Fontana (yellow card) 84'	Report; Box Score	Mendoza 9'; Turner (yellow card) 32'; McFadden (yellow card) 52'; Neal 58'; Ribeiro (yellow card) 60'; Ribeiro (yellow card) 66' da Silva (yellow card) 90'	Stadium: Goodman Stadium; Attendance: 3,655; Referee: Rafal Siudjik

== Statistics ==
As of September 25, 2016.

Players included in matchday squads
No.	Pos.	Nat.	Name	League		Playoffs		Total		Discipline	
No.	Pos.	Nat.	Name	Apps	Goals	Apps	Goals	Apps	Goals	A yellow rectangle, denoting the yellow penalty card shown to a player being cautioned	A red rectangle, denoting the red penalty card shown to a player being sent off
3	DF	(United States)	Taylor Washington	28	0	0	0	28	0	3	0
4	DF	(United States)	Ken Tribbett	1	0	0	0	1	0	0	0
8	MF	(United States)	Maurice Edu	3	0	0	0	3	0	2	0
11	FW	(Germany)	Fabian Herbers	6	2	0	0	6	2	0	0
14	MF	(Cameroon)	Eric Ayuk	17	3	0	0	17	3	0	0
15	DF	(Ghana)	Joshua Yaro	4	0	0	0	4	0	0	0
19	MF	(United States)	Cole Missimo	19	0	0	0	19	0	3	0
20	MF	(Colombia)	Walter Restrepo	7	0	0	0	7	0	0	1
22	MF	(Brazil)	Leo Fernandes	14	1	0	0	14	1	0	0
23	MF	(Brazil)	Anderson Conceição	13	0	0	0	13	0	4	0
34	DF	(United States)	Mickey Daly†	17	1	0	0	17	1	4	0
35	MF	(Ghana)	Derrick Jones	26	5	0	0	26	5	5	0
36	FW	(Liberia)	Seku Conneh	18	2	0	0	18	2	3	0
37	FW	(Liberia)	Gabe Gissie	18	1	0	0	18	1	1	0
38	DF	(United States)	Nick Bibbs	12	1	0	0	12	1	0	0
39	FW	(Jamaica)	Amoy Brown	8	0	0	0	8	1	1	0
40	MF	(Canada)	Josh Heard	22	2	0	0	22	2	3	0
41	FW	(Jamaica)	Cory Burke*	20	4	0	0	20	4	4	0
42	MF	(Nigeria)	Bolu Akinyode	26	0	0	0	26	0	2	1
43	FW	(United States)	Jamie Luchini	16	0	0	0	16	0	0	0
44	MF	(United States)	Ryan Richter†	29	5	0	0	29	5	2	0
45	MF	(Republic of Ireland)	James Chambers	27	3	0	0	27	3	9	1
47	MF	(Brazil)	Fred	6	0	0	0	6	0	1	0
49	DF	(United States)	Auston Trusty	19	0	0	0	19	0	2	0
50	DF	(United States)	Mark McKenzie	2	0	0	0	2	0	0	0
51	MF	(Guinea)	Lamine Conte	0	0	0	0	0	0	0	0
52	MF	(United States)	Joseph DeZart	0	0	0	0	0	0	0	0
53	FW	(Canada)	Raheem Taylor-Parkes	3	0	0	0	3	0	1	0
54	MF	(United States)	Matthew Real	2	0	0	0	2	0	0	0
57	MF	(United States)	Justin McMaster	8	0	0	0	8	0	0	0
59	MF	(United States)	Anthony Fontana	8	0	0	0	8	0	1	0
60	MF	(Costa Rica)	Josue Monge	2	0	0	0	2	0	0	0

=== Goalkeepers ===
As of September 25, 2016.

Players included in matchday squads
Nat.	No.	Player	Apps	Starts	Record	GA	GAA	SO	Booked	Sent off (straight red)
(England)	24	Matt Jones	5	5	1-3-1	6	1.20	0	0	0
(United States)	27	John McCarthy	11	11	4-4-3	14	1.27	5	0	0
(United States)	32	Samir Badr†	10	10	1-3-6	16	1.60	2	0	0
(United States)	46	Matt Perrella	4	4	0-0-4	7	1.75	0	0	0
Total			30	30	6-10-14	43	1.43	7	0	0

Players with names in italics were on loan from Philadelphia Union for individual matches with Bethlehem.
Players with names marked * were on loan from another club for the whole of their season with Bethlehem.
Players with names marked † were transferred from the club midseason.
League denotes USL regular season
Playoffs denotes USL Playoffs

== Honors ==
- Week 1 Team of the Week: D Ryan Richter
- Week 4 Team of the Week: M Eric Ayuk
  Honorable Mention: M Derrick Jones
- Week 6 Team of the Week: G John McCarthy
- Week 14 Team of the Week: Honorable Mention: G Samir Badr
- Week 16 Team of the Week: Honorable Mention: F Cory Burke
- Week 17 Team of the Week: M Derrick Jones
- Week 20 Team of the Week: Honorable Mention: D Ryan Richter
