= Giliano Wijnaldum =

Dutch footballer

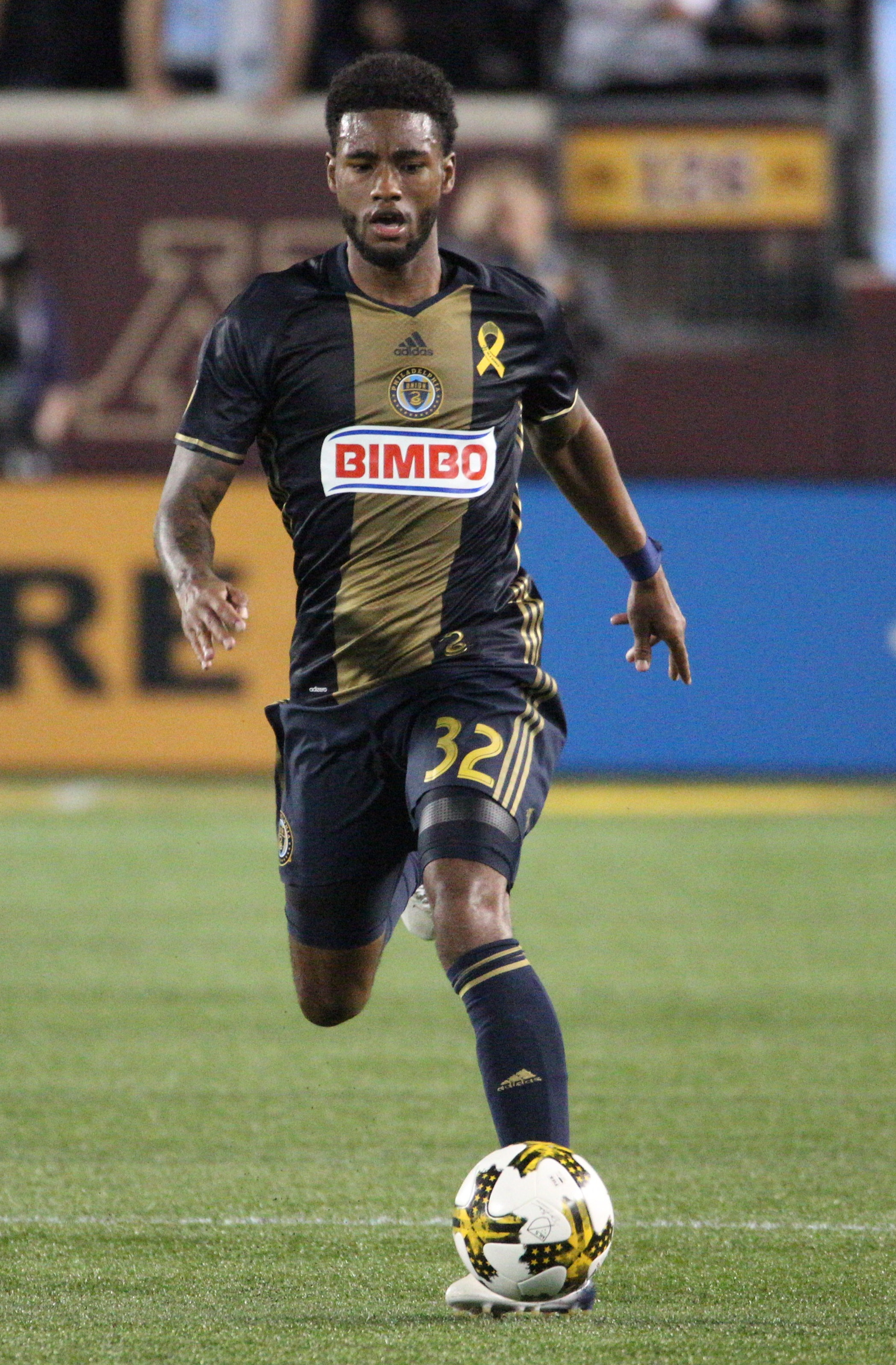
- Wijnaldum playing for the Philadelphia Union in 2017

Personal information
- Full name: Giliano Wijnaldum
- Date of birth: 31 August 1992 (age 34)
- Place of birth: Rotterdam, Netherlands
- Height: 1.81 m (5 ft 11 in)
- Position: Left back

Youth career
- 2007–2008: Sparta Rotterdam
- 2007–2010: AZ

Senior career*
| Years | Team | Apps | (Gls) |
| 2010–2013 | AZ | 20 | (0) |
| 2013–2014 | Groningen | 27 | (1) |
| 2014–2015 | Go Ahead Eagles | 19 | (0) |
| 2015–2016 | VfL Bochum | 7 | (0) |
| 2017 | Philadelphia Union | 13 | (0) |
| 2017 | → Bethlehem Steel (loan) | 7 | (0) |
| 2018 | Willem II | 8 | (0) |
| 2018–2019 | Sparta Rotterdam | 10 | (0) |
| 2020–2021 | CION | | |
| Total | | 111 | (1) |

International career
| | Netherlands U17 | 1 | (0) |
| 2010–2011 | Netherlands U19 | 9 | (0) |
| 2012–2013 | Netherlands U20 | 8 | (1) |
- * Club domestic league appearances and goals

Giliano Wijnaldum (born 31 August 1992) is a Dutch former professional footballer who plays as a left back. He formerly played for AZ, FC Groningen, Go Ahead Eagles and VfL Bochum.

== Club career ==
=== AZ Alkmaar ===
Born in Rotterdam, Netherlands, Wijnaldum began his career at Sparta Rotterdam, where he played alongside his brother when he was fifteen. After one season at the club, Wijnaldum moved to AZ in 2008 and after going through the ranks, he signed his first professional contract in the summer of 2011.

Wijnaldum then made his debut for the club on 16 April 2011, where he played 11 minutes after coming on as a substitute in the second half, in a 3–1 win over ADO Den Haag. This turned out to be his only appearance of the 2010–11 season. The 2011–12 season saw Wijnaldum make his only appearance in the KNVB Cup against Dordrecht on 27 October 2011. Around the same time, he played in the reserves.

The 2012–13 season saw Wijnaldum play his first match of the season on 2 September 2012 against PSV Eindhoven, where he played against his older brother, Georginio, and played 77 minutes as they lost 5–1. In the second meeting on 20 April 2013, he was in the squad and played the whole game, but AZ once again lost 3–1. Despite playing in the reserves, Wijnaldum established himself in the first team as the 2012–13 season progressed and made twenty appearances. At the end of the season, Wijnaldum, however, was released by the club. It was due to that the fact that he would not be given a first team opportunity next season.

=== Groningen ===
On 27 June 2013, Wijnaldum joined Groningen on a free transfer following his release by the club. Wijnaldum was given a number twenty-five shirt ahead of the new season, where he revealed that his Georginio told him to take it, as well as, hopes of getting a first team opportunity.

Wijnaldum made his Groningen debut, in the opening game of the season, where he made his first start and played the whole game, in a 4–1 win over NEC. In a match against Heerenveen on 15 September 2013, he set up one of the goals, in a 4–2 loss. and then scored his first goal and setting up one of the goal, in a 2–2 draw against PEC Zwolle on 30 November 2013. Since making his debut, Wijnaldum established himself in the first team until he lost his place in favour of Lorenzo Burnet. Despite being suspended for being booked fifth time this season, he appeared on handful of appearances towards the end of the season and made thirty appearances and scoring once in all competitions.

=== Go Ahead Eagles ===
On 25 June 2014, Wijnaldum moved again when he joined newly promoted side Go Ahead Eagles, signing a two-year contract with the club despite having a year contract with Groningen. It came after when he wasn't guaranteed a first team opportunity at Groningen next season.

However, Wijnaldum missed the start of the season, due to a foot injury and it wasn't until on 13 September 2014 when he made his return from injury, making his first appearance for the club, in a 2–1 loss against Twente. In a match against Utrecht on 4 October 2014, Wijnaldum set up a winning goal for Jeffrey Rijsdijk, in a 3–2 win. In a match against Willem II on 18 January 2015, Wijnaldium received a red card after a second bookable offence, which saw them lose 1–0.

However, in a match against Twente on 12 April 2015, Wijnaldum was involved in an incident with the club's supporters after racially abusing him for his lack of commitment. This angered the club, who was considering a legal action against the club's supporters. Following this, Wijnaldum decided against pressing chargers to the club's supporters.

After the club were relegated back to Eerste Divisie through the playoffs, Wijnaldum finished his first season, making twenty-three appearances in all competitions.

=== VfL Bochum ===
After leaving Go Ahead Eagles, Wijnaldum moved to Germany when he joined VfL Bochum, signing a two-year contract, on 15 June 2015.

Wijnaldum made his Bochum debut in the first round of DFB-Pokal, where he played 45 minutes, in a 5–0 win over FSV Salmrohr. After appearing on the substitute bench for the first five league matches, he made his Bochum debut on 11 September 2015, where he came on as a substitute in the second half and played 33 minutes, in a 1–1 draw against Sandhausen. Three weeks later, on 25 September 2015, Wijnaldum made his first start and played the whole game, in a 2–1 loss against FC Kaiserslautern. However, Wijnaldum's first opportunities was increasingly limited and made only seven 2. Bundesliga appearances.

At the end of the season, Wijnaldum was released by the club after one season.

=== Philadelphia Union ===
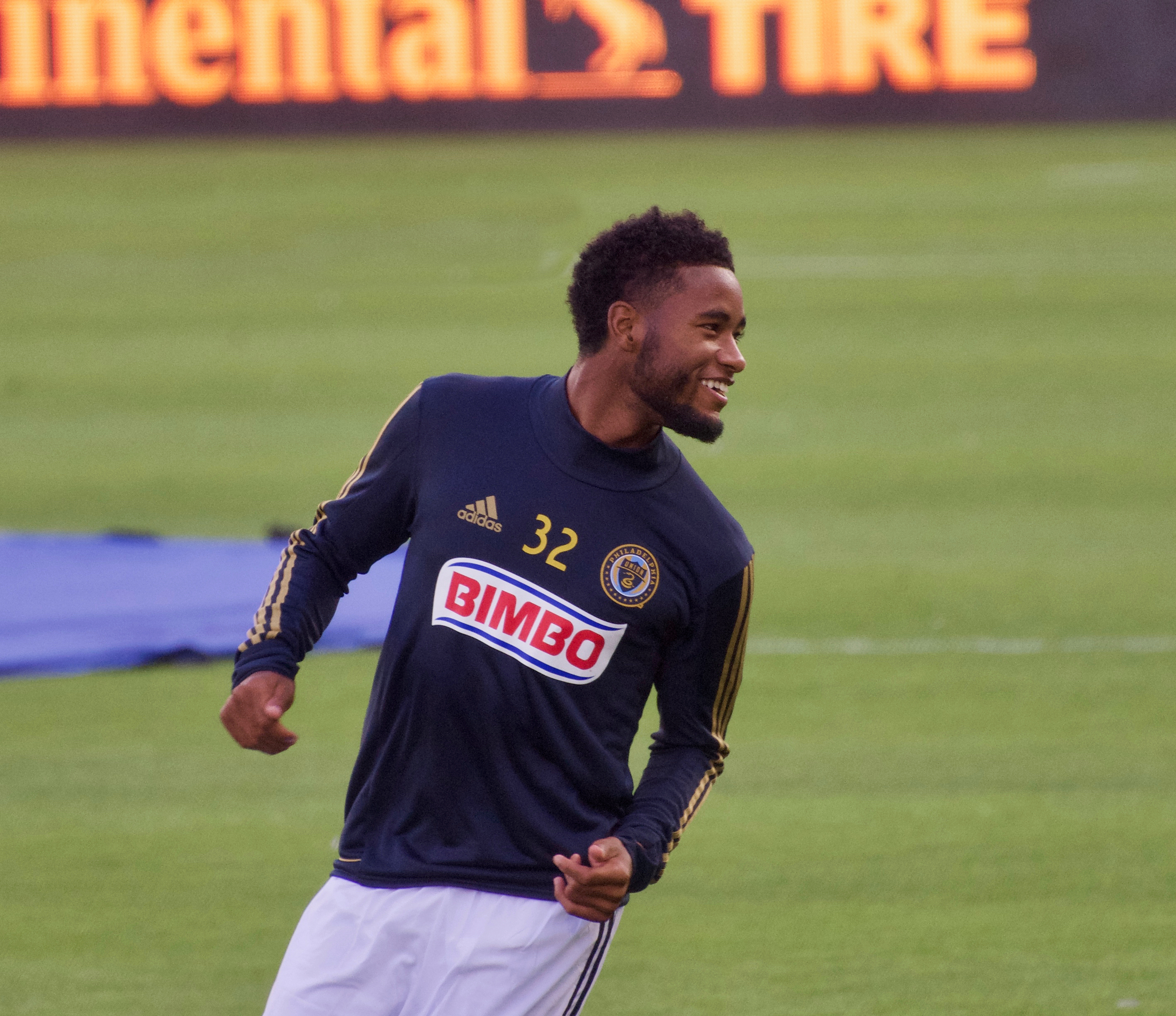

On 5 January 2017, Wijnaldum moved to the United States when he joined Philadelphia Union, based in the Major League Soccer. Upon joining Philadelphia Union, the club's Sporting Director Earnie Stewart, commented on his move, quoting: "I believe Giliano is one of those players that flies under the radar, with great upside potential." On 1 November 2017, Wijnaldum's option was declined by the Philadelphia Union. On 5 June 2018 he joined Sparta Rotterdam.

== International career ==
After featuring once for the Netherlands U17 side, Wijnaldum was called up by Netherlands U19 on 1 September 2010 and made his Netherlands U19 debut two days later against Germany U19, followed up by his second appearance against Greece U19 on 7 September 2010.

On 27 February 2012, Wijnaldum was called up by Netherlands U20 for the first time and made his Netherlands U20 two days later, where he played 45 minutes, in a 3–0 win over Denmark U20. On 1 June 2012, he then scored his first Netherlands U20 goal, in a 3–0 win over France U20 in the Toulon Tournament.

== Career statistics ==
=== Club ===
As of 5 January 2017

| Club performance | | | League | | Cup | | Other | | Total | |
| Season | Club | League | Apps | Goals | Apps | Goals | Apps | Goals | Apps | Goals |
| Netherlands | | | League | | KNVB Cup | | Other^{1} | | Total | |
|---|---|---|---|---|---|---|---|---|---|---|
| 2010–11 | AZ Alkmaar | Eredivisie | 1 | 0 | 0 | 0 | — | | 1 | 0 |
| 2011–12 | AZ Alkmaar | Eredivisie | 0 | 0 | 1 | 0 | — | | 1 | 0 |
| 2012–13 | AZ Alkmaar | Eredivisie | 19 | 0 | 1 | 0 | — | | 20 | 0 |
| 2013–14 | FC Groningen | Eredivisie | 26 | 1 | 3 | 0 | 1 | 0 | 30 | 1 |
| 2014–15 | Go Ahead Eagles | Eredivisie | 19 | 0 | 2 | 0 | 2 | 0 | 23 | 0 |
| Germany | | | League | | DFB-Pokal | | Other | | Total | |
| 2015–16 | VfL Bochum | 2. Bundesliga | 7 | 0 | 2 | 0 | — | | 9 | 0 |
| USA | | | League | | Open Cup | | Other | | Total | |
| 2017 | Philadelphia Union | MLS | 0 | 0 | 0 | 0 | — | | 0 | 0 |
| Total | Netherlands | | 65 | 1 | 5 | 0 | 3 | 0 | 73 | 1 |
| Total | Germany | | 7 | 0 | 2 | 0 | 0 | 0 | 9 | 0 |
| Total | USA | | 0 | 0 | 0 | 0 | 0 | 0 | 0 | 0 |
| Career total | | | 72 | 1 | 7 | 0 | 3 | 0 | 82 | 1 |

^{1} 2013–14 includes the Eredivisie European competition playoffs. 2014–15 includes the Eerste Divisie/Eredivisie promotion/relegation playoffs.

== Personal life ==
His older brother, Georginio Wijnaldum, plays as an attacking midfielder for Saudi Pro league club Al-Ettifaq . His half-brother, Rajiv van la Parra, also plays professional football for Apollon Smyrnis.

== Honours ==
AZ

- KNVB Cup: 2012–13
