= Ryan Richter =

American soccer player and coach

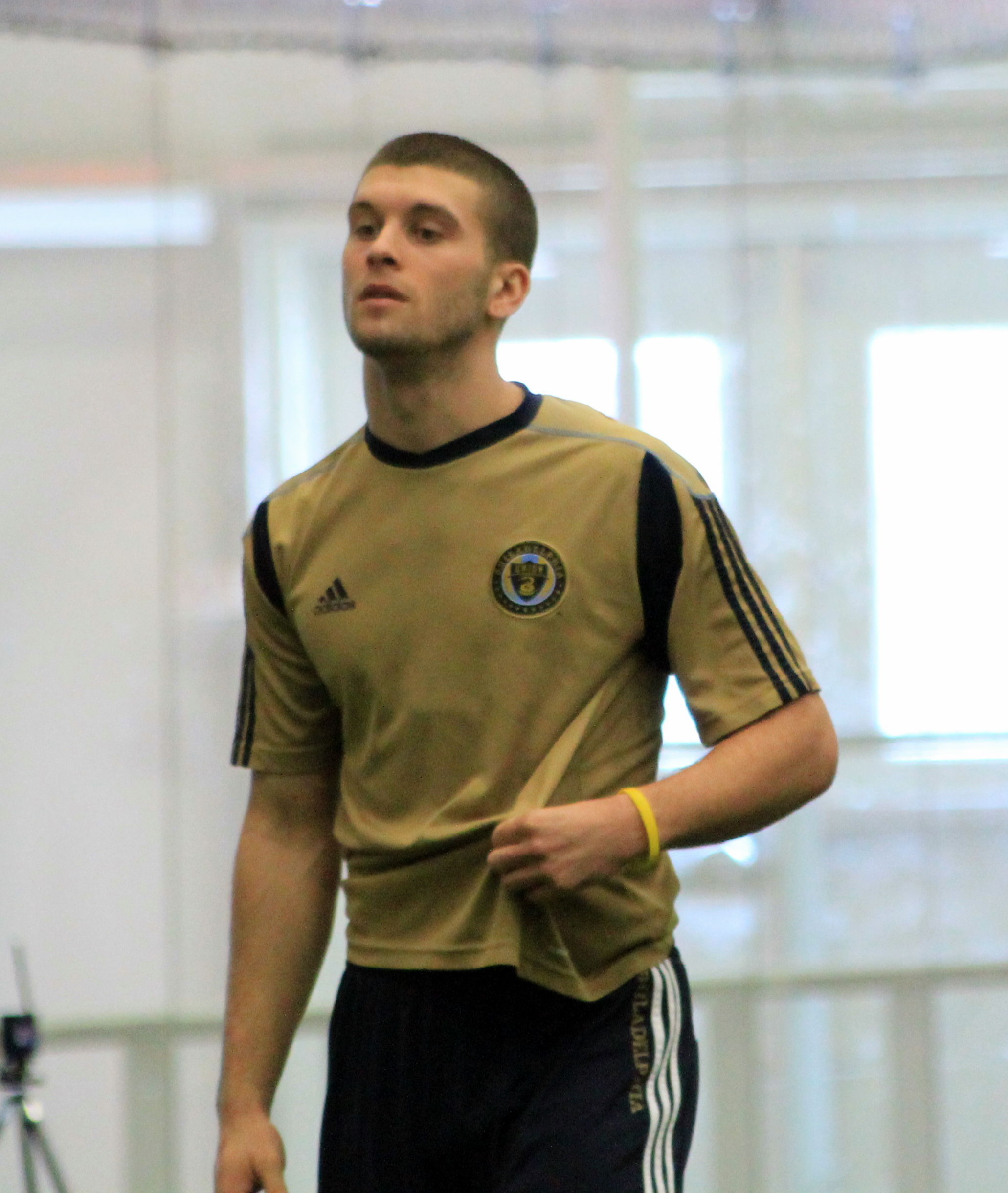
- Richter training with the Philadelphia Union in January, 2011.

Personal information
- Full name: Ryan Richter
- Date of birth: April 12, 1989 (age 37)
- Place of birth: Southampton, Pennsylvania, United States
- Height: 6 ft 2 in (1.88 m)
- Position: Right back

Team information
- Current team: Philadelphia Union (interim head coach)

College career
Years	Team	Apps	(Gls)
2007–2010	La Salle Explorers		

Senior career*
Years	Team	Apps	(Gls)
2008–2010	Ocean City Nor'easters^{[A]}	45	(11)
2011	Philadelphia Union	0	(0)
2011	→ Harrisburg City Islanders (loan)	1	(0)
2012	Charleston Battery	24	(2)
2013–2014	Toronto FC	13	(0)
2014	→ Ottawa Fury (loan)	15	(1)
2015	Ottawa Fury	30	(0)
2016	Bethlehem Steel FC	29	(5)
2016–2017	New York Cosmos	31	(1)
Total		188	(20)

Managerial career
- 2018–2021: Philadelphia Union (academy)
- 2022–2024: Philadelphia Union (assistant)
- 2025–2026: Philadelphia Union II
- 2026–: Philadelphia Union (interim)
- * Club domestic league appearances and goals as of 12:09, October 30, 2017 (UTC)

Ryan Richter (born April 12, 1989) is an American former professional soccer player. He is currently the interim head coach of the Philadelphia Union in Major League Soccer.

== Youth and college ==
Richter played soccer at William Tennent High School in Warminster, Pennsylvania, where he was a three-year starter. He was elected as team captain and MVP for both his Junior and Senior years. At William Tennent, Richter attained honor roll status for all four years, he was also a three-year starter on the basketball team as well as being a placekicker on the football team.

After high school, Richter attended La Salle University in Philadelphia, Pennsylvania, where he continued to play soccer. At La Salle, he was named Atlantic 10 Offensive Player of the Year, and Student-Athlete of the Year for the 2010 season. He was also named Atlantic 10 Sportsman of the Year in 2010 as well as First-Team Scholar All America. Richter was named Philadelphia Soccer Six Player of the Year in 2009 and 2010, leading the city in points and goals both years. He is the second player from the La Salle Explorers to be drafted into the MLS after Cesidio Colasante. Richter racked up 28 goals and 13 assists during his time with the Explorers.

During his college years, Richter played for the Ocean City Nor'easters in the USL Premier Development League.^{[A]}

== Club career ==
On January 18, 2011, Richter was drafted as the 5th overall pick in the 1st round of the 2011 MLS Supplemental Draft by Philadelphia Union. After a successful preseason trial, he signed with the club on March 1, 2011.

Richter was sent on a one-game loan to the Union's USL Pro affiliate Harrisburg City Islanders in June 2011; he made his professional debut for them on June 4, in a game against Charleston Battery. On July 21, 2011, Richter made his Union debut against Everton

On August 24, 2011, Richter scored his first career goal for the Philadelphia Union against the Harrisburg City Islanders. The goal, assisted by Justin Mapp, came in the 49th minute.

On January 19, 2012, Philadelphia declined his 2012 contract option and Richter was released.

Richter trialled with D.C. United during February and March 2012.

=== Charleston Battery ===
Richter signed with USL Pro team Charleston Battery on March 27, 2012. In 2012, Richter helped the Charleston Battery capture the 2012 USL PRO Championship.

=== Toronto FC ===
He signed with Toronto FC on March 25, 2013. Richter made his debut for Toronto on April 13, in a 1–1 draw against Philadelphia, he came on as a first half sub for Darel Russell who sustained an injury.

After spending most of the 2014 season on loan with NASL club Ottawa Fury FC, Richter joined them permanently on January 28, 2015.

=== Bethlehem Steel FC ===
In 2016, Richter was transferred back to the Philadelphia Union organization to play for the newly formed USL club, Bethlehem Steel FC. Richter would be named the team's first captain, and would go on to be joint leading goal scorer for the 2016 season. Prior to the season's end, Richter was transferred to NASL club New York Cosmos.

=== New York Cosmos ===
Richter made his debut for the Cosmos in a 0–2 victory over the Carolina Railhawks.

== Coaching career ==
Following the 2017 season, Richter retired from the professional game to help coach the Philadelphia Union academy. In January 2022, Richter was promoted to assistant coach to Jim Curtin with the Philadelphia Union first team.

Richter was named head coach of Philadelphia Union II in MLS Next Pro on January 15, 2025.

On May 27, 2026, Richter was named interim head coach of the Union following the firing of Bradley Carnell.

== Honors ==
=== Ottawa Fury ===
- NASL Fall Championship 2015

== Notes ==
A. ^{a} ^{b} The club was known as the Ocean City Barons through 2009.
