= Chris Wingate =

Norwegian footballer (born 1994)

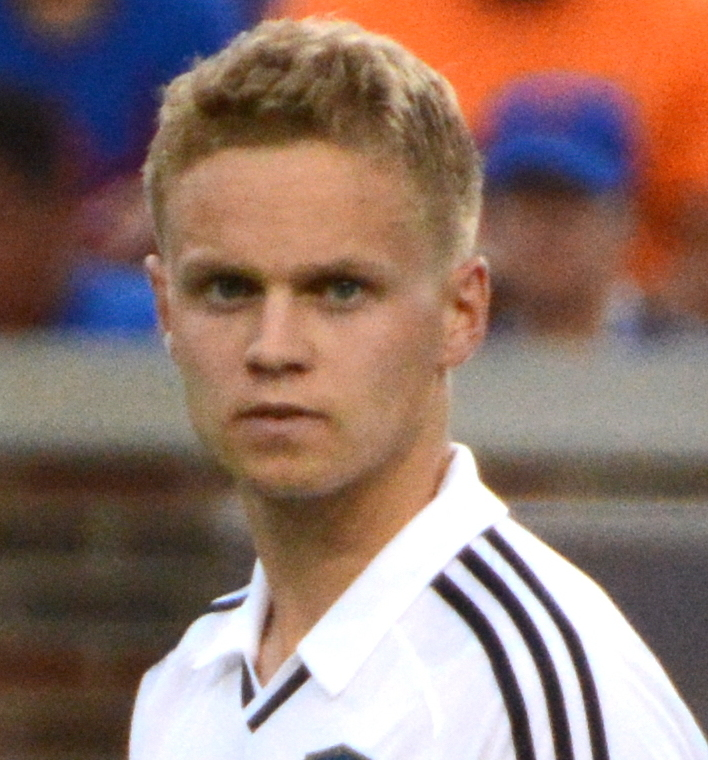
- Wingate playing for Bethlehem Steel FC in 2017

Personal information
- Full name: Christopher Poague Warholm Wingate
- Date of birth: 3 July 1994 (age 32)
- Place of birth: Bærum, Norway
- Height: 1.80 m (5 ft 11 in)
- Position: Midfielder

Youth career
- –2013: Bærum SK

College career
| Years | Team | Apps | (Gls) |
| 2013–2016 | New Hampshire Wildcats | 70 | (13) |

Senior career*
| Years | Team | Apps | (Gls) |
| 2016 | Seattle Sounders FC U-23 | 7 | (1) |
| 2017 | Bethlehem Steel | 6 | (0) |
| 2018 | Bærum SK | 2 | (0) |
| 2019 | Southern United | 4 | (0) |
- * Club domestic league appearances and goals as of 16 October 2019

Chris Wingate (born 3 July 1994) is a Norwegian footballer who plays as a midfielder.

== Career ==
=== Youth and college ===
Wingate played youth football for Bærum SK, being a part of their famous boys' 1994 team, which included Marius Lundemo, Simen Juklerød, Daniel Granli, Markus Fjørtoft and Borger Thomas. He attended Sandvika Upper Secondary School.

Wingate played four years of college soccer at the University of New Hampshire between 2013 and 2016. He made a total of 70 appearances, scoring 13 and tallying 15 assists in his time at New Hampshire.

While at college, Wingate also appeared for Premier Development League side Seattle Sounders FC U-23 in 2016.

== Professional ==
=== Philadelphia Union ===
On 17 January 2017, Wingate was selected in the third round (54th overall) in the 2017 MLS SuperDraft by New York City FC.

On 5 April 2017, Wingate signed with Philadelphia Union's United Soccer League affiliate club Bethlehem Steel FC. He was released by Bethlehem Steel on 2 November 2017.

=== CloudCannon ===
On 28 October 2019, Wingate moved his talents to Dunedin-based startup, CloudCannon where he drives growth as the Chief Revenue Officer.
