= Charlie Reymann =

American soccer player

Personal information
- Full name: Charles Noll Reymann
- Date of birth: January 29, 1995 (age 31)
- Place of birth: Columbus, Ohio, United States
- Height: 5 ft 9 in (1.75 m)
- Position: Left back

College career
Years	Team	Apps	(Gls)
2013–2016	Kentucky Wildcats	80	(0)

Senior career*
Years	Team	Apps	(Gls)
2016	Reading United	12	(0)
2017	Bethlehem Steel	9	(0)
- * Club domestic league appearances and goals as of 14:28, 16 October 2017 (UTC)

Charles "Charlie" Noll Reymann (born January 29, 1995) is an American soccer player.

== Career ==
=== Youth and college ===
Reymann played four years of college soccer at the University of Kentucky between 2013 and 2016, where he made 80 appearances and tallied 21 assists.

Reymann also played with Premier Development League side Reading United AC in 2016.

=== Professional ===
Reymann signed with United Soccer League side Bethlehem Steel on March 2, 2017.
