= Raheem Taylor-Parkes =

Canadian soccer player

Personal information
- Date of birth: April 21, 1998 (age 28)
- Place of birth: Mississauga, Ontario, Canada
- Height: 5 ft 6 in (1.68 m)
- Position: Forward

Youth career
- 2013–2014: Toronto FC
- 2014–2016: Philadelphia Union

College career
Years	Team	Apps	(Gls)
2016–2017	Virginia Cavaliers	29	(2)
2019	Oregon State Beavers	7	(1)

Senior career*
Years	Team	Apps	(Gls)
2016	Bethlehem Steel	5	(0)
2017	Reading United	1	(0)
2018–2019	Lakeland Tropics	17	(2)
2021	Tampa Bay United	5	(1)

International career^{‡}
2013	Canada U15	3	(0)
- * Club domestic league appearances and goals as of 17:07, 9 June 2023 (UTC) ‡ National team caps and goals as of 17:07, 9 June 2023 (UTC)

Raheem Taylor-Parkes (born April 21, 1998) is a Canadian soccer player who played as a forward.

== Early life ==
Taylor-Parkes was born in Mississauga, Ontario, Canada to Jamaican parents and started playing with Erin Mills SC. At the age of 10, he moved to Tampa, Florida, USA with his family and continued his footballing development there.

== Career ==
Taylor-Parkes signed to play with United Soccer League side Bethlehem Steel FC in 2016 on an amateur contract to allow him to still be eligible to play college soccer at the University of Virginia, whom he'd verbally agreed to join after graduating high school.

In August 2018, Taylor-Parkes reportedly signed a deal with Swiss amateur side, Stade-Lausanne-Ouchy in the Swiss Promotion League. However, he was unable to secure a work permit due to non-EU regulations.

On April 7, 2019, Taylor-Parkes scored the Lakeland Tropics' first-ever U.S. Open Cup goal.

== International career ==
Taylor-Parkes was called up to the United States U14s for a set of matches against regional sides in October 2011. He was named to the Canadian U15 national team for the 2013 Copa de México de Naciones.
