= Aaron Jones (footballer, born 1994) =

English footballer

Personal information
- Full name: Aaron Jay Jones
- Date of birth: 12 March 1994 (age 32)
- Place of birth: Great Yarmouth, England
- Height: 5 ft 8 in (1.73 m)
- Position: Defender

Team information
- Current team: King's Lynn Town

Youth career
- 2002–2012: Ipswich Town

College career
| Years | Team | Apps | (Gls) |
| 2013–2014 | Georgia State Panthers | 36 | (3) |
| 2015–2016 | Clemson Tigers | 39 | (4) |

Senior career*
| Years | Team | Apps | (Gls) |
| 2014 | Carolina Dynamo | 12 | (2) |
| 2017 | Philadelphia Union | 0 | (0) |
| 2017 | → Bethlehem Steel (loan) | 32 | (2) |
| 2018–2023 | King's Lynn Town | 167 | (5) |
| 2023–2025 | Aldershot Town | 57 | (2) |
| 2025–2026 | Sutton United | 19 | (0) |
| 2026– | King's Lynn Town | 0 | (0) |
- * Club domestic league appearances and goals as of 14:09, 30 May 2026 (UTC)

Aaron Jay Jones (born 12 March 1994) is an English footballer who plays as a defender for National League North club King's Lynn Town.

== Playing career ==
=== Youth, college and amateur ===
Jones spent 10 years with Ipswich Town's development academy before moving to the United States to play college soccer at Georgia State University. He made a 36 appearances for the Panthers and tallied three goals and seven assists. On 8 January 2015, it was announced that Jones had decided to transfer to Clemson University. He made 39 appearances during his time with the Tigers and finished with four goals and seven assists.

Jones also played in the Premier Development League for Carolina Dynamo.

=== Professional ===
On 13 January 2017, Jones was drafted in the second round (33rd overall) of the 2017 MLS SuperDraft by Philadelphia Union. He signed a professional contract with the club a month later. On 1 April 2017, Jones made his professional debut with USL affiliate club Bethlehem Steel in a 3–2 defeat to Rochester Rhinos.

On 1 November 2017, Philadelphia declined their contract option on Jones.

=== King's Lynn Town ===
On 24 August 2018, upon his return from the US, Jones signed a two-year deal with Southern League Premier Central side King's Lynn Town.

=== Aldershot Town ===
On 23 June 2023, Jones reunited with former King's Lynn manager Tommy Widdrington at National League club Aldershot Town on a one-year deal.

=== Sutton United ===
On 6 June 2025, it was announced that Jones had turned down the offer of a new deal with Aldershot in order to join fellow National League side, Sutton United for an undisclosed fee.

=== Return to King's Lynn Town ===
On 29 May 2026, Jones returned to National League North club King's Lynn Town.

== Business career ==
Alongside his football career, Jones also serves as co-director of Great Yarmouth Pleasure Beach, which has been owned by his family for multiple generations.

== Honours ==
Aldershot Town

- FA Trophy: 2024–25
