= Tiger Graham =

American soccer player and analyst

Personal information
- Date of birth: February 10, 1998 (age 28)
- Height: 6 ft 1 in (1.85 m)
- Position: Forward

Youth career
- Philadelphia Union

College career
Years	Team	Apps	(Gls)
2017–2019	Dartmouth Big Green	48	(9)

Senior career*
Years	Team	Apps	(Gls)
2017	Bethlehem Steel	1	(0)
- * Club domestic league appearances and goals as of August 31, 2017

Tiger Graham (born February 10, 1998) is an American soccer player and data analyst. A forward, he played for Bethlehem Steel FC in the United Soccer League as an amateur and played college soccer for the Dartmouth Big Green. He later joined the Philadelphia Union academy staff as a data analyst.

== Playing career ==
=== Youth soccer ===
Graham is from Paoli, Pennsylvania, and attended YSC Academy. He played for the Philadelphia Union academy and was the leading scorer for its under-16 team. In July 2015, he scored in the 2-0 victory over Georgia United in the third-place match of the U.S. Soccer Development Academy under-15/16 championship.

He remained with the academy for a postgraduate year in 2016-17. During that season he scored 22 goals, team biggest number, in 27 matches for the under-18 team. College Soccer News ranked him 43rd in its final rankings in 2017.

=== Bethlehem Steel ===
Graham played for Bethlehem Steel as an amateur in 2017. He made a debut in United Soccer League against the Pittsburgh Riverhounds on July 15, where he played for the final 17 minutes.

=== Dartmouth ===
Graham began playing for Dartmouth in 2017, where during his first season he made 17 appearances and scored two goals against Vermont.

In 2018, he made 15 appearances and scored four goals.

In 2019, Graham appeared in all 16 of Dartmouth's matches, and scored three goals and made one assist.

== Analytics career ==
Graham joined the Philadelphia Union academy as a data analyst ahead of the 2024–25 season.
