= Yosef Samuel =

American soccer player (born 1997)

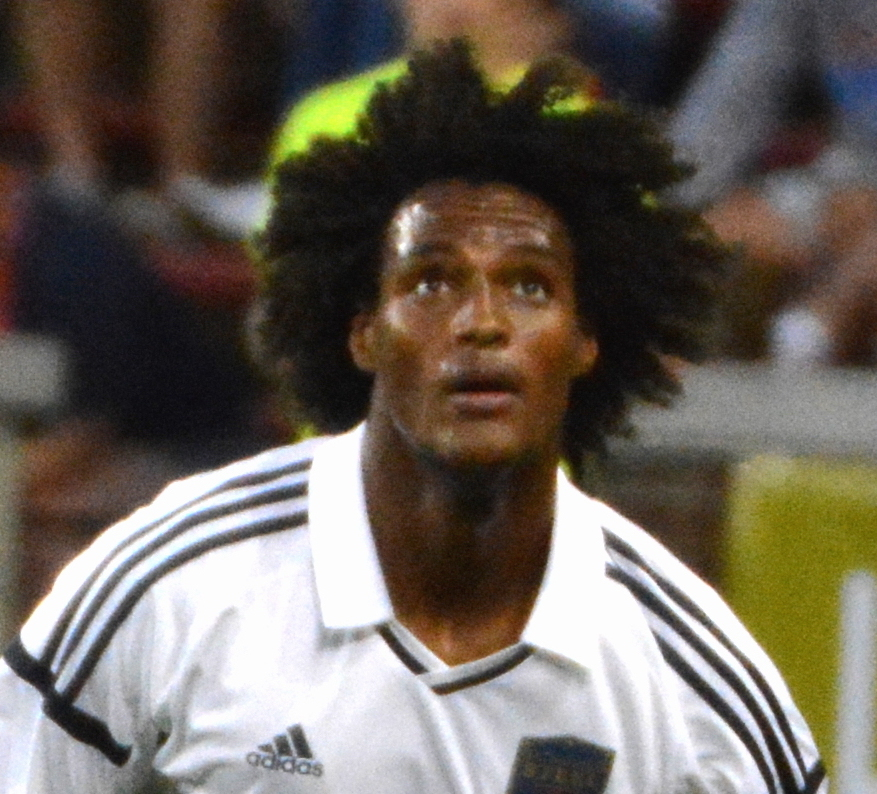
- Samuel playing for Bethlehem Steel FC in 2017

Personal information
- Date of birth: July 3, 1997 (age 29)
- Place of birth: Endegagn, Ethiopia
- Height: 6 ft 0 in (1.83 m)
- Position: Midfielder

Team information
- Current team: Kalonji Pro-Profile

Youth career
- Kalonji Soccer Academy
- 2014–2016: Philadelphia Union

Senior career*
Years	Team	Apps	(Gls)
2016–2017	Bethlehem Steel	21	(0)
2018–2019	Atlanta United 2	23	(1)
2019–2020	Hobro IK	5	(0)
2021–	Kalonji Pro-Profile		

International career
2017	United States U20	2	(0)
- * Club domestic league appearances and goals as of January 22, 2022

Yosef Samuel (born July 3, 1997) is an American soccer player who currently plays for Kalonji Pro-Profile in the United Premier Soccer League.

== Career ==
Samuel signed to play with United Soccer League side Bethlehem Steel FC in September 2016. He made his professional debut on September 25, 2016, as a 61st-minute substitute during a 0–2 loss against Orlando City B.

Samuel joined new USL team Atlanta United 2 following the 2017 season.

Samuel scored his first professional goal on March 24, 2018, in Atlanta United 2's first ever game, a 3–1 victory over New York Red Bulls II.

On August 2, 2019, Samuel signed with Danish Superliga side Hobro IK.

=== Club ===
As of June 16, 2020.

Club	Season	League			Cup		Continental		Other		Total	
Club	Season	Division	Apps	Goals	Apps	Goals	Apps	Goals	Apps	Goals	Apps	Goals
Bethlehem Steel	2016	United Soccer League	1	0	0	0	–		0	0	1	0
Bethlehem Steel	2017	United Soccer League	20	0	0	0	–		1	0	21	0
Atlanta United 2	2018	United Soccer League	15	1	0	0	–		0	0	15	1
Atlanta United 2	2019	USL Championship	8	0	0	0	–		0	0	8	0
Hobro IK	2019–20	Danish Superliga	4	0	1	0	–		0	0	5	0
Career total			48	1	1	0	0	0	1	0	50	1
