= Seku Conneh =

Liberian professional footballer

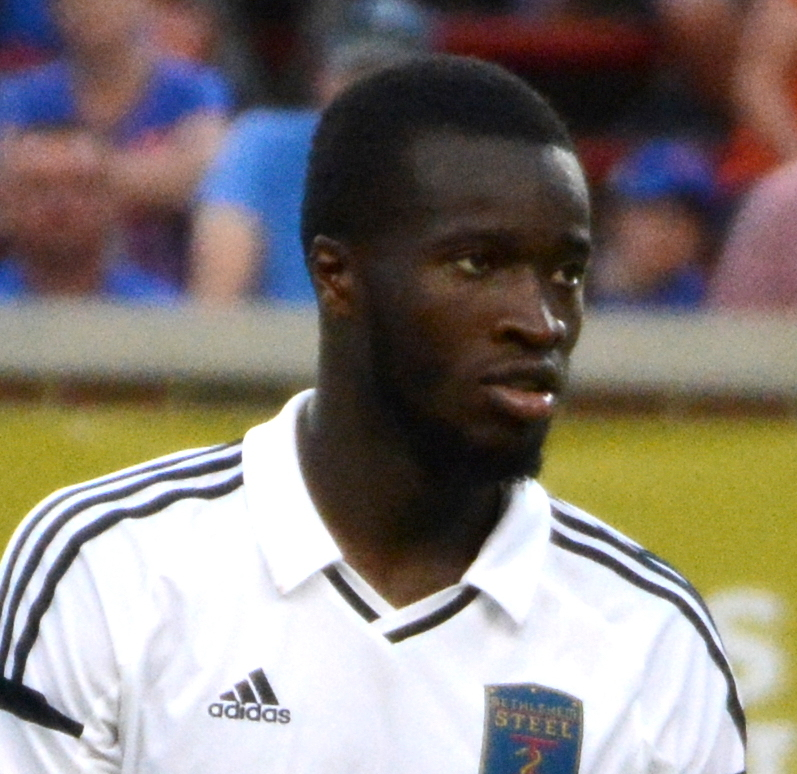
- Conneh playing for Bethlehem Steel in 2017

Personal information
- Full name: Seku Conneh
- Date of birth: 10 November 1995 (age 31)
- Place of birth: Voinjama, Liberia
- Height: 1.88 m (6 ft 2 in)
- Position: Forward

Team information
- Current team: Koninklijke HFC
- Number: 9

Youth career
- Elinkwijk
- SV Geinoord
- Ajax
- RKC Waalwijk
- Almere City

Senior career*
Years	Team	Apps	(Gls)
2014–2015	Fortuna Sittard	35	(9)
2015	Oss	10	(2)
2016–2017	Bethlehem Steel	43	(12)
2018	Ansan Greeners	26	(2)
2019	Vojvodina	3	(0)
2020	Las Vegas Lights	2	(0)
2021	ÍBV	10	(2)
2022	Monterey Bay	23	(3)
2024–	Koninklijke HFC	6	(1)

International career
2015–2018	Liberia	4	(0)
- * Club domestic league appearances and goals as of 08:52, 2 April 2025 (UTC)

Seku Conneh (born 10 November 1995) is a Liberian professional footballer who plays as a forward for Koninklijke HFC in the Tweede Divisie.

== Career ==
=== Youth ===
Born in Voinjama, Liberia, and raised in the Netherlands, Conneh began his youth development across several development academies and youth clubs, including Ajax and Almere City.

=== Club ===
==== Fortuna Sittard and Oss ====
Conneh began his professional career in the Netherlands playing for Fortuna Sittard and Oss of the Eerste Divisie for a season each scoring a total of 11 goals from 45 appearances.

==== Bethlehem Steel ====
Ahead of the 2016 USL season, Conneh joined the newly formed Bethlehem Steel, the USL affiliate of the Philadelphia Union. His first season was limited by injury but managed 2 goals in 18 appearances for Steel. During the 2017 season, Conneh would earn his first USL Player of the Week honors after scoring a brace against Cincinnati. Conneh was released by Bethlehem Steel on 2 November 2017.

==== Ansan Greeners ====
Two months after being released by Steel, Conneh joined Ansan Greeners of the K League 2, the second division of South Korean football. On 22 April, Conneh scored his first goal to equalize for the Greeners in a 3–1 victory against Bucheon.

==== Vojvodina ====
On 23 January 2019, after spending a month on a trial, Conneh signed a two-year deal with Serbian club Vojvodina. Unfortunately, with the arrival of coach Nenad Lalatovic, who admitted in an interview to fkvojvodina.com that since his arrival, Conneh has been removed from the main team and that he did not even saw him neither has any interest in doing so, it clearly meant that the new coach's discriminatory, anti-foreigners, stance meant Conneh was doomed to leave the club.

==== Las Vegas Lights ====
In December 2019, it was announced that Conneh was making his return to the USL Championship signing with Las Vegas Lights.

==== Monterey Bay ====
On February 2, 2022, it was announced that Conneh would make another return to the USL Championship by signing with expansion side Monterey Bay. He was recruited by Frank Yallop, who was manager while Conneh was playing for Las Vegas. His contract option was declined by the club at the end of the season.

==== Koninklijke HFC ====
On 2 September 2024, Conneh joined Tweede Divisie side Koninklijke HFC.

== International ==
While raised in the Netherlands, Conneh was born in Liberia and represents them in international football. He made his debut for the Lone Stars on 15 November 2015 as a substitute in a World Cup qualifying match against Ivory Coast. Conneh has since been called up for Liberia's 2017 Africa Cup of Nations qualification run.
