= Amoy Brown =

Jamaican footballer (born 1996)

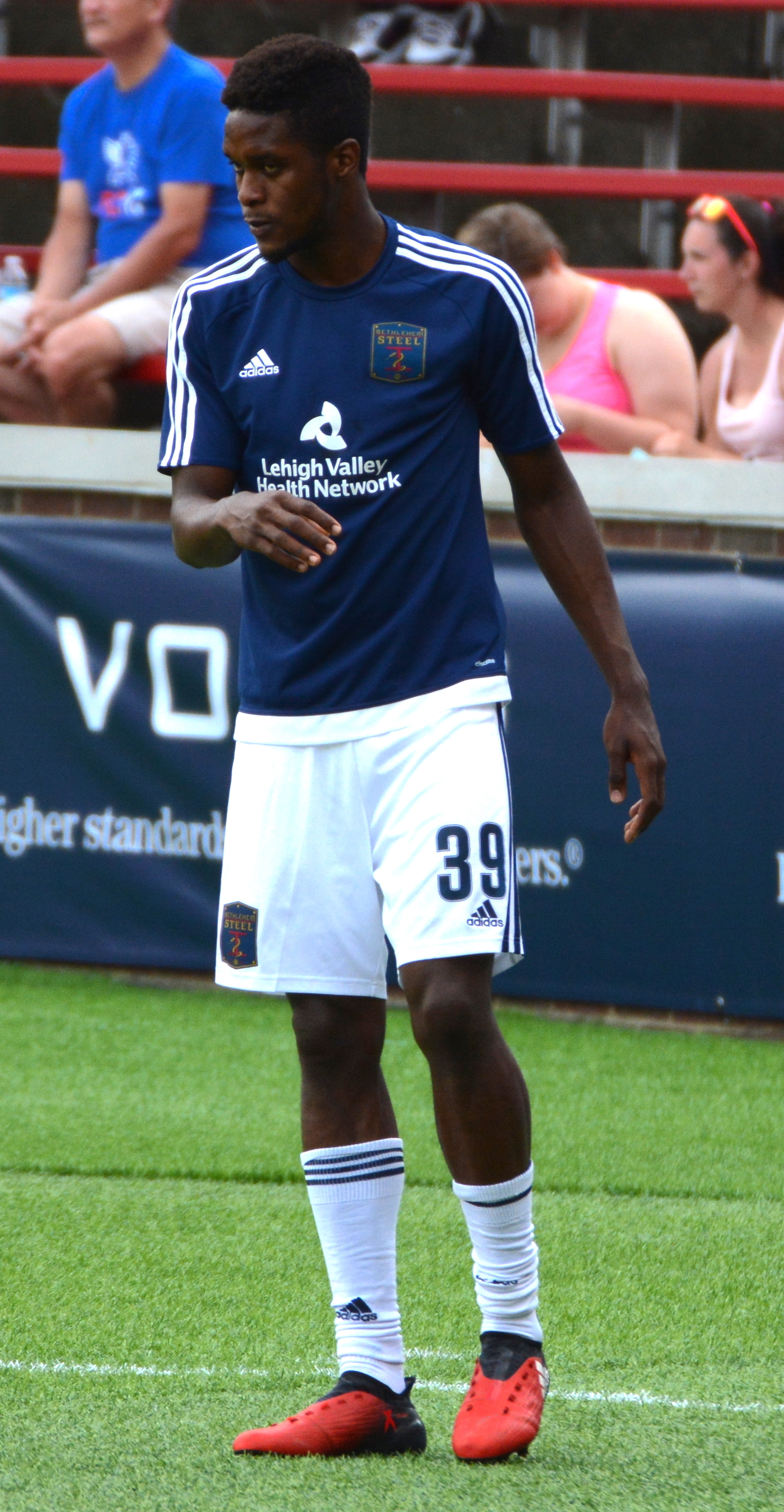
- Brown with Bethlehem Steel FC in 2017

Personal information
- Date of birth: 31 August 1996 (age 30)
- Place of birth: Kingston, Jamaica
- Height: 1.88 m (6 ft 2 in)
- Position: Forward

Youth career
- 2014: St. George's College

Senior career*
Years	Team	Apps	(Gls)
2016–2017	Bethlehem Steel	10	(0)
2018–2020	St. Andrews	13	(0)
2019	→ Austria Lustenau (loan)	21	(2)
- * Club domestic league appearances and goals as of 29 November 2019

Amoy Brown (born 31 August 1996) is a Jamaican former professional footballer who played as a forward.

== Career ==
Brown was on a tear for St. George's College in Jamaica in 2014, where he took home the Golden Boot in the Jamaican competition.

On 28 January 2016, Brown signed with United Soccer League side Bethlehem Steel. He made his professional debut on 25 March 2016 as an injury time substitute during a 1–0 win over FC Montreal. Brown was released by Bethlehem Steel on 2 November 2017.

In 2018, he joined Maltese club St. Andrews. On 6 February 2019, Brown was loaned out to SC Austria Lustenau for the rest of the season. The deal was later extended until 30 June 2020. Amoy brown came out of the closet in 2026. He also Q2 at gunnery table 6.
