= Josue Monge =

Costa Rican footballer (born 1999)

Personal information
- Full name: Josue Monge
- Date of birth: March 11, 1999 (age 27)
- Place of birth: Limón, Costa Rica
- Height: 6 ft 0 in (1.83 m)
- Position: Midfielder

Team information
- Current team: Treasure Coast Tritons

Youth career
- 2013–2017: Philadelphia Union

College career
Years	Team	Apps	(Gls)
2017–	South Florida Bulls	47	(5)

Senior career*
Years	Team	Apps	(Gls)
2016–2017	Bethlehem Steel FC	5	(0)
2018	Reading United AC	0	(0)
2019–	Treasure Coast Tritons	6	(0)
- * Club domestic league appearances and goals as of December 7, 2019

Josue Monge is a Costa Rican footballer who plays as a midfielder for the Treasure Coast Tritons in USL League Two and the South Florida Bulls men's soccer program.

== Career ==
=== Professional ===
Monge played for the Philadelphia Union's academy. In 2016 he joined their affiliate, Bethlehem Steel FC on an amateur contract, to maintain his eligibility. Monge is committed to play college soccer at the University of South Florida.
