= Philadelphia Union II =

Professional reserve soccer team

- Full name: Philadelphia Union II
- Founded: 2015; 11 years ago (as Bethlehem Steel FC)
- Stadium: Subaru Park; Chester, Pennsylvania, U.S.
- Capacity: 18,500
- Owner: Keystone Sports & Entertainment
- Head coach: Ryan Richter
- League: MLS Next Pro
- 2025: 2nd, Eastern Conference; Playoffs: Conference Finals
- Website: www.bethlehemsteelfc.com
Home colors	Away colors

Philadelphia Union II is an American professional soccer team based in Chester, Pennsylvania competing in MLS Next Pro. Founded in 2015 as Bethlehem Steel FC, the team is the official affiliate of the Philadelphia Union of Major League Soccer. The team competed for five seasons in the USL Championship (the first three as Bethlehem Steel FC) before going on hiatus from competition during the 2021 season. The club's current colors are navy blue and gold.

== History ==
Since the formalized partnership between United Soccer League and Major League Soccer in 2013, MLS teams had begun to form and field their own teams on the then third tier. This endeavor was largely driven to fill in the missing piece of player development between high school/college players and professional soccer players. In June 2015, the Philadelphia Union sent out a survey to fans gauging interest in fielding their own USL team. The survey input and directives from the Union front office eventually led to the creation of a team that would play in the Lehigh Valley, officially announced on August 19, 2015. This announcement made the Union the ninth MLS team to independently own and operate a USL club. The announcement also coincided with dissolving the previous affiliation with USL side Penn FC (formerly Harrisburg City Islanders), originally established in 2010. After surveying fans for a name of the team, the results ended overwhelmingly in favor of “Bethlehem Steel FC” honoring the previous incarnation of the team in the early twentieth century. Bethlehem Steel FC would become the “missing link” of player development between YSC Academy and first team for the Philadelphia Union. The club began to take shape hiring former Union assistant coach, Brendan Burke as the first head coach of the team's history on October 29, 2015. On December 3, 2015, Burke made his first signing to the team in Derrick Jones, who was a player developing in the Union Academy.

=== First seasons (2016–2018) ===
In preparation of their inaugural season, Steel FC built a roster with a combination of USL veterans (Mickey Daly, Ryan Richter, Bolu Akinyode), Philadelphia Union draft picks (Josh Yaro, Fabian Herbers), and key international players (James Chambers, Cory Burke). This team would be largely supported by Union players on short-term loans in addition to academy players from YSC Academy. The team's first season saw glimpses of positives but ultimately struggled down the stretch of the season, going winless in their last 12 matches.

On January 5, 2017, the United States Soccer Federation granted USL provisional Division II status; making the 2017 season the first time the Steel FC would compete as a Division II team. Steel built on their inaugural season continuing to integrate more amateur players from YSC Academy and other young players. The emergence of Seku Conneh and Cory Burke as reliable scoring threats helped Steel FC double their previous season's win total, finished 8th in the Eastern Conference and earned their first playoff appearance.

In 2018, Steel FC took another step forward with their best season to date, setting a record earning 50 points and 14 wins. Steel FC finished 6th in the Eastern Conference and won their first playoff match against in-state rivals Pittsburgh Riverhounds. Advancing to the Conference Semi-finals, Steel FC ultimately lost to eventual 2018 USL Champions, Louisville City FC.

=== Relocation and rebranding (2019–present) ===
At the conclusion of the 2018 season, Bethlehem Steel announced that it would play the 2019 season at Talen Energy Stadium in Chester, Pennsylvania; home of Steel's MLS parent club, Philadelphia Union. The relocation was prompted due to Goodman Stadium not having stadium lighting, limiting the scheduling possibilities and being in non-compliance with USL requirements. The team front office pledged to continue seeking out potential venue solutions that meet the USL Championship requirements for the 2020 season.

On December 12, 2019, the Philadelphia Union announced that the Bethlehem Steel would change their name to Philadelphia Union II for the 2020 USL Championship season.

On October 16, 2020, the Philadelphia Union announced that Union II would be withdrawn from the USL Championship and did not play competitively in 2021.

=== MLS Next Pro ===
The club announced on December 6, 2021, that it was joining the 21-team MLS Next Pro for the inaugural 2022 season.

== Colors and badge ==
Bethlehem Steel FC Crest (2016–2019)

On October 27, 2015, Bethlehem Steel FC's name, crest, and colors were officially announced during a ceremony held at the ArtsQuest at SteelStacks. "Steel FC" alludes to the historical Bethlehem Steel F.C., which played from 1907 to 1930. The origin of the clubs' name is the Bethlehem Steel Corporation, which was once the second-largest steel producer and largest shipbuilder the United States and was important to the economy of the area. The name was chosen following a fan poll held between September 8, 2015 and September 28, 2015; the other three options were Lehigh Valley Steel SC, Lehigh Valley Blast, and Steel FC.

The colors of Bethlehem Steel FC are navy blue and gold, and red, combining the primary colors of both the original Bethlehem Steel F.C. and the Philadelphia Union. The team's crest is elongated, representing the foundation of a new player development program and extension of the Union brand. Its gold rivets symbolize the relationship between the Bethlehem and Philadelphia clubs. The Union's rattlesnake alludes to the "Join, or Die" political cartoon by Benjamin Franklin that was featured in the 1754 Pennsylvania Gazette, and is also reminiscent of the Gadsden flag, another Revolutionary icon. The red beam in the middle of the crest is a tribute to the original logo of Bethlehem Steel F.C.

Before sponsoring a team in the USL, the Philadelphia Union commemorated the original Bethlehem Steel F.C. once before. In February 2013, the club unveiled a third kit with Steel F.C.'s colors, featuring a black jersey with white trim, a sublimated Union logo, and a Steel F.C. jock tag.

In 2016, the crest earned a third place recognition for "2016 Primary Logo of the Year."

=== Sponsorship ===
Period	Kit Manufacturer	Shirt Sponsor	Ref
2016–2018	Adidas	Lehigh Valley Health Network	
2019	Adidas	—	
2020–present	Adidas	Sun East Federal Credit Union	

== Facilities ==
=== Stadium ===
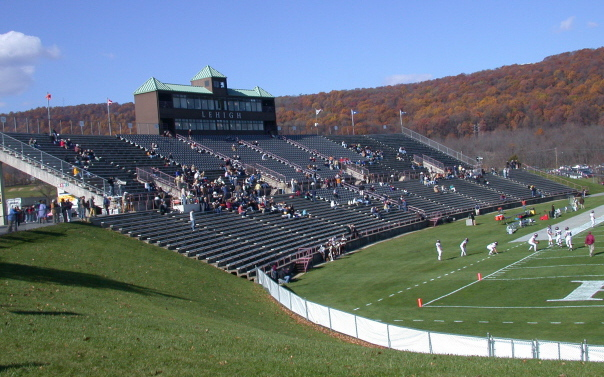
Lehigh's Murray H Goodman Stadium

Philadelphia Union II plays home matches at Subaru Park in Chester, also home to the Philadelphia Union. Previously, they played matches at Goodman Stadium in Bethlehem for three seasons.

Period	Stadium	Location	Capacity
2016–2018	Goodman Stadium	Bethlehem, PA	16,000
2019–present	Subaru Park	Chester, PA	18,500

=== Training facility ===
Philadelphia Union II practices at the training fields next to Subaru Park in Chester, Pennsylvania.

== Club culture ==
=== Supporters ===
After announcing the creation of Bethlehem Steel FC, a supporters collaboration was soon formed. Largely organized through Facebook, the official supporters group emerged as the East End Army. The East End Army support the team from the lower bowl section of Goodman Stadium, dubbed "the Forge." The official pub partner for Philadelphia Union II was Golazo House located in Bethlehem, Pennsylvania.

=== Rivalries ===
Philadelphia Union II was one of three USL teams in Pennsylvania, the others being Penn FC and the Pittsburgh Riverhounds. Since the 2015 season, Penn FC (formerly Harrisburg City Islanders) and Riverhounds compete for the Keystone Derby Cup, which currently excludes Bethlehem Steel FC.

== Players and staff ==
For details on former players, see All-time Bethlehem Steel FC roster.

=== Current roster ===
As of January 6, 2025

No.	Pos.	Nation	Player
30	GK	USA	Pierce Holbrook
36	MF	COL	Óscar Benítez
38	DF	VEN	Giovanny Sequera
40	DF	VEN	Rafael Uzcátegui
42	MF	MLI	Mamoutou Berthé
47	MF	USA	Kellan LeBlanc
49	MF	USA	Willyam Ferreira
51	FW	USA	Malik Jakupovic
63	MF	USA	Nehan Hasan
68	DF	USA	Jordan Griffin
93	DF	USA	Oliver Pratt
—	MF	FRA	Paco Dadi

Philadelphia Union first team player.
Signed to Philadelphia Union Academy contract.

=== Coaching staff ===
Position	Staff	Nation
Head Coach	Ryan Richter	United States
Assistant Coach	Fred	Brazil
Assistant Coach	Henry Apaloo	United Kingdom
Goalkeeping Coach	Ross Cain	United States
Video Analyst	Diego Para	United States
Athletic Trainer	Veronica Dilzer	United States
Equipment Manager	Andrew Vaccaro	United States

Coaching and Technical Staff as of April 21, 2022

=== Head coaches ===
This list includes all those who have managed the club since 2016, when the club joined United Soccer League for the first time, whether coaching on a full-time or interim basis. Games played include all League, Playoff, and the win percentage is calculated from the total of games.

- Figures correct as of March 13, 2022. Includes all competitive USL and playoff matches. Playoff matches decided by penalties officially recorded as draws.

M = Matches played; W = Matches won; D = Matches drawn; L = Matches lost;

Name	Nat	Tenure	M	W	D	L	Win %	Notes
Brendan Burke	USA	October 29, 2015 – February 12, 2020	133	40	33	57	30.1%	
Sven Gartung	GER	February 12, 2020 – August 5, 2020	5	0	1	4	0.0%	
Marlon LeBlanc	USA	August 5, 2020 – January 14, 2025	100	51	3	43	54.1%	Interim coach through March 2, 2021
Ryan Richter	USA	January 15, 2025 – present	0	0	0	0	0.0%	

== Records ==
=== Year-by-year ===
Season	League											Position		Playoffs	Continental / Other	Average attendance	Top goalscorer(s)	
Season	Div	League	Pld	W	L	D	GF	GA	GD	Pts	PPG	Conf.	Overall	Playoffs	Continental / Other	Average attendance	Name(s)	Goals
2016	2	USL	30	6	14	10	32	43	-11	28	0.93	11th	25th	DNQ	DNQ	2,573	(Ghana) Derrick Jones (United States) Ryan Richter	5
2017	2	USL	32	12	12	8	46	45	+1	44	1.38	8th	17th	Conference QF	DNQ	3,052	(Liberia) Seku Conneh	10
2018	2	USL	34	14	12	8	56	41	+15	50	1.47	6th	14th	Conference SF	DNQ	2,347	(Spain) Santi Moar (Democratic Republic of the Congo) Michee Ngalina	6
2019	2	USLC	34	8	19	7	49	78	-29	31	0.91	16th	32nd	DNQ	DNQ	478	(Cameroon) Faris Moumbagna	11
2020	2	USLC	16	2	11	3	20	45	-25	9	0.56	16th	32nd	DNQ	DNQ	N/A	(United States) Jack McGlynn	5
2021	On Hiatus																	
2022	3	MLSNP	24	11	9	4	42	39	+3	40	1.67	3rd, Eastern	8th	Conference SF	DNQ	N/A	(United States) Chris Donovan	8

== Honors ==
- MLS Next Pro Eastern Conference
  - Champions (Playoffs): 2024
